= María Jimena Piccolo =

Argentine actress, singer, and radio host

- Born: July 22, 1985 (age 40); Buenos Aires, Argentina
- Other names: Jimena Piccolo
- Occupations: Actress, Singer and Radio Host
- Years active: 1991–present

María Jimena Piccolo (born July 22, 1985), better known as Jimena Piccolo is an Argentine actress, singer and radio host.

== Biography ==
María Jimena Piccolo was born on July 22, 1985, in Buenos Aires, Argentina.

== Career ==
María Jimena Piccolo began her career in television with an advertisement for Banco Río in 1991. In 1993, she was part of the cast of the television series Primer amor. In 1994, she made her film debut, with the movie Amigomío. From 1995 to 1998, she was part of the cast of the youth television series Chiquititas. Between 1996 and 1998, she made the theatrical seasons of Chiquititas. In 1999, she was part of the cast of the television series Trillizos ¡dijo la partera!. In August 2001, she makes a small participation in the youth television series Chiquititas. In 2001, she was summoned by Cris Morena for the special Chiquititas de Oro where she and the most prominent cast members of all seasons came together to receive the award Chiquititas de Oro. In 2002, she was part of the cast of the television series Kachorra. In 2005, she was part of the cast of the television series Amor mío. In 2005, she was part of the cast of the television series ¿Quién es el Jefe?. In 2006, she starred in an episode of Mujeres asesinas. In 2007, she was part of the cast of the television series Los cuentos de Fontanarrosa. In 2008, she was part of the cast of the television series Mujeres de nadie. In 2011, she starred in an episode of Decisiones de Vida. In 2011, she was part of the cast of the television series Yo soy virgen. In 2014, she was part of the cast of the television series Somos familia. In 2014, she performed the play Ego, mi verdadera historia. In 2015, she performed the play La vida prestada. In 2017, she performed the play El Mundo de Stefy y vos.

== Filmography ==
=== Television ===
Year	Title	Character	Channel
1993	Primer amor	Rosario	Canal 9
1995–1998	Chiquititas	Jimena Gómez del Solar	Telefe
1999	Trillizos ¡dijo la partera!	Melina Scarpelli	Telefe
2001	Chiquititas	Jimena Gómez del Solar	Telefe
2002	Kachorra	Lorena	Telefe
2005	Amor mío		Telefe
2005	¿Quién es el Jefe?		Telefe
2006	Mujeres asesinas		Canal 13
2007	Los cuentos de Fontanarrosa		TV Pública
2008	Mujeres de nadie	Lucy	Canal 13
2011	Desiciones de Vida		Canal 9
2011	Yo soy virgen	Jimena	
2014	Somos familia	Miriam	Telefe

=== Movies ===
Year	Movie	Character	Director
1994	Amigomío		Jeanine Meerapfel and Alcides Chiesa

=== Theater ===
Year	Title	Character	Director	Theater
1996-1998	Chiquititas	Jimena Gómez del Solar	Cris Morena	Teatro Gran Rex
2014	Ego, mi verdadera historia		Diego Beares	Teatro El Piccolino
2015	La vida prestada	Bárbara		Teatro Porteño
2017	El Mundo de Stefy y vos		Gustavo Monje	

== Discography ==
=== Soundtrack albums ===
- 1995 — Chiquititas Vol. 1
- 1996 — Chiquititas Vol. 2
- 1997 — Chiquititas Vol. 3
- 1998 — Chiquititas Vol. 4

== Awards and nominations ==
Year	Award	Category	Work	Result
1998	Martín Fierro Awards	Best Child Actress	Chiquititas	Nominated

== See also ==
- List of Argentines
- Chiquititas
- Nadia Di Cello
