= Cris Morena Group =

Argentine television production company

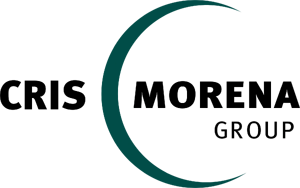
- Type: Private
- Industry: Telenovelas, music, live concerts, merchandising
- Founded: 2002
- Headquarters: Buenos Aires, Argentina
- Key people: Cris Morena (CEO)
- Website: Cris Morena Group

Cris Morena Group is a production company, in charge of creating mostly youth programming and formats. Founded in 2002 by Cris Morena, it is one of the main production companies in Argentina and is based in Buenos Aires. Unlike other production companies, Cris Morena Group not only devises TV formats, but also generates ancillary businesses such as CDs, magazines, licenses, musicals and theatrical productions.

Cris Morena productions are also adapted across the world. Her shows have been adapted to, among others, India, Brazil, Mexico, Colombia and Chile.

Most CMG productions are co-produced with RGB Entertainment, except for Rebelde Way and Rincón de Luz which were co-produced by Israeli company Dori Media Group. CMG is responsible for the creative part of the projects while RGB is in charge of the business, contracts and finances.

Cris Morena Group was temporarily closed for two years. Its comeback production is weekly youth-oriented fiction Aliados, co-produced with Telefe.

== TV series ==
=== Chiquititas ===
See Chiquititas

- Year: 1995–2001
- Main Cast: Benjamin Rojas, Camila Bordonaba, Luisana Lopilato, Felipe Colombo, Romina Yan.

=== Rebelde Way ===
See Rebelde Way.

- Year: 2002–2003
- Main Cast: Benjamin Rojas, Camila Bordonaba, Luisana Lopilato, Felipe Colombo, Catherine Fulop, Martin Seefeld, Boy Olmi.
- Notes: Originally broadcast in Canal 9 and America 2. Co-produced by Dori Media. Format adapted in Mexico, India, Brazil, Portugal and Chile.

=== Rincón de Luz ===
See Rincón de Luz.

- Year: 2003
- Main Cast: Soledad Pastorutti, Guido Kaczka.
- Notes: Originally broadcast in Canal 9 and America 2. Co-produced by Dori Media.

Rebelde (Mexican TV se)

see Rebelde (Mexican TV series)

Year: 2004–2006

Main Cast: Dulce María, Anahí, Christopher von Uckermann, Alfonso Herrera and Enrique Rocha, Juan Ferrara.

Note: Rebelde (Mexican TV series) was a Mexican remake to the Argentinian original series Rebelde Way

=== Floricienta ===
See Floricienta.

- Year: 2004–2005
- Cast: Florencia Bertotti, Isabel Macedo, Juan Gil Navarro, Benjamin Rojas, Fabio Di Tomaso
- Notes: Originally broadcast in Canal 13. Co-produced alongside RGB Entertainment. Rebroadcast around the world by Disney Channel. Format adapted in Brazil, Mexico, Chile and Colombia.

=== Amor Mío ===
- Year: 2005
- Cast: Romina Yan, Damian de Santo
- Notes: Morena's first sitcom and primetime show, aired at Telefe in 2005. Format was successfully adapted in Mexico and in Russia. Co-produced alongside RGB Entertainment.

=== Alma Pirata ===
- Year: 2006
- Cast: Benjamin Rojas, Fabian Mazzei, Luisana Lopilato, Mariano Martínez, Nicolás Vázquez, Isabel Macedo
- Notes: Aired at Telefe in 2006. Co-produced with RGB Entertainment.

=== Casi Angeles ===
- Year: 2007–2010
- Cast: Nicolás Vázquez, Emilia Attias, Mariano Torre, Julia Calvo, Gimena Accardi, Jimena Barón, Mariana Espósito, María Eugenia Suárez, Peter Lanzani, Gaston Dalmau, Nicolas Riera.
- Notes: Aired at Telefe between 2007 and 2010, with four seasons.

=== B&B: Bella y Bestia ===
- Year: 2008
- Cast: Romina Yan, Damián de Santo

=== Jake & Blake ===
- Year 2009
- Cast Benjamín Rojas
- Notes: Shot in English and aired at Disney Channel across the world.

=== Aliados ===
- Year 2013
- Cast Peter Lanzani, Pablo Martínez
- Notes: Cris Morena return to production after a two-year hiatus. Co-produced with Telefe.

== Movies ==
=== Chiquititas: Rincón de Luz ===
- Year: 2001
- Cast: Romina Yan, Facundo Arana, Felipe Colombo, Camila Bordonaba, Luisana Lopilato, Benjamín Rojas, Agustín Sierra, Nadia Di Cello and many others.

=== Erreway: 4 Caminos ===
See 4 Caminos.

- Year: 2004
- Cast: Felipe Colombo, Camila Bordonaba, Luisana Lopilato, Benjamín Rojas, Rolly Serrano
- Production: Yair Dori International, RGB Entertainment
- Note: Music from Erreway's album Memoria is used in this movie.

== Music ==
Cris Morena started her career as a songwriter in 1980 and since then she has written a number of hits for renowned artists such as Sergio Denis, Cae, Sandra Mihanovich and Flavia Palmiero - to name a few. She has also written songs for big-time television shows such as Ritmo de la noche, Mi familia es un dibujo, Jugate conmigo, Cebollitas, Floricienta, Chiquititas, Verano del 98, Rebelde Way and Alma Pirata, among many others.

Her songs have been chart-topping hits not just in Argentina, but also in Latin America, Asia and Europe. Cris Morena has over 500 songs registered under her name and she is one of the most successful and prolific authored of music for children and teenagers of the last couple decades.
