= Daniella Mastricchio =

Argentine actress and singer

- Born: November 18, 1987 (age 38); Buenos Aires, Argentina
- Occupations: Actress and singer
- Years active: 1991–present
- Spouse: Mauro Yakimiuk (m. 2016; div. 2017)
- Children: 3

Daniella Paola Mastricchio (born November 18, 1987) is an Argentine actress and singer.

== Career ==
Daniella Mastricchio began her career in television with an advertisement for Banco Río in 1991.

After several television advertisements, in 1995, she was summoned by Cris Morena to be part of the cast of Chiquititas. From 1996 to 1998, she performed the theatrical seasons of Chiquititas. In August 2001, she makes a small participation in the youth television series Chiquititas. In 2001, she was summoned by Cris Morena for the special Chiquititas de Oro where she and the most prominent of all seasons came together to receive the award Chiquititas de Oro.

In 2002, she was part of the cast of the television series Kachorra. In 2003, she makes a small participation in the television series Máximo corazón.

In 2015, she performed the play La que nunca estuvo. In 2015, she performed the play Un cuento Atrapasueños. In 2017, she performed the play El tiro por la culata.

== Personal life ==
From the age of 14 she had a boyfriend named Maxi. In 2005, when Daniella was 18 years old, she became a mother for the first time of a child they named Valentín.

Daniella spent 8 years in a relationship. In 2012, she gave birth to her second child, a girl, whom they called Sol Morena, name given by the character she played in Chiquititas and in honor of Cris Morena.

On July 7, 2016, she got married in a civil ceremony with Mauro Yakimiuk. In 2017, she gave birth to her third child, a boy, whom they called Bautista Yakimiuk. After a year of being married, they divorced in 2017.

== Filmography ==
=== Television programs ===
Year	Program	Channel	Notes
1995	Jugate Conmigo	Telefe	Guest
1997	Hola Susana, te estamos llamando	Telefe	Guest
1997–1998	Almorzando con Mirtha Legrand	Canal 13	Guest
1997–1998	Videomatch	Telefe	Guest
1998	Susana Gimenéz	Telefe	Guest
1998	Nico R	Telefe	Guest
1999–2000	Sábado Bus	Telefe	Guest
2015	Viva la tarde	C5N	Guest
2017	Las Puertas	Canal 13	Guest
2018	Incorrectas	América TV	Guest
2019	Chismoses	Net TV	Guest
2019	¿Quién quiere ser millonario?	Telefe	Participant
2019	Cortá por Lozano	Telefe	Guest

=== Television ===
Year	Title	Character	Channel
1995–1998	Chiquititas	Sol Rivera/Sol Méndez Ayala Fraga	Telefe
2001	Chiquititas	Sol Rivera/Sol Méndez Ayala Fraga	Telefe
2002	Kachorra	Lilian	Telefe
2003	Máximo corazón		Telefe

=== Theater ===
Year	Title	Character	Director	Theater
1996–1998	Chiquititas	Sol Rivera/Sol Méndez Ayala Fraga	Cris Morena	Teatro Gran Rex
2015	La que nunca estuvo		Mauro Yakimiuk	
2015	Un cuento Atrapasueños		Daniella Mastricchio	
2017	El tiro por la culata	Jessica	Gabyta Fridman	Teatro El Tinglado

== Discography ==
=== Soundtrack albums ===
- 1995 — Chiquititas Vol. 1
- 1996 — Chiquititas Vol. 2
- 1997 — Chiquititas Vol. 3
- 1998 — Chiquititas Vol. 4

== See also ==
- List of Argentines
