= Rincón de Luz (disambiguation) =

Rincón de Luz is a 2003 Argentinian telenovela for children and teenagers.

Rincón de Luz may also refer to:

- Chiquititas: Rincón de Luz, a 2001 Argentine film.
- Rincón de Luz (orphanage), the fictional orphanage from Chiquititas

== See also ==
- Chiquititas, an Argentine children's musical telenovela
- El rincón de los prodigios, 1987 Mexican telenovela
