= Ezequiel Castaño =

Argentine actor

- Born: December 4, 1981 (age 44); Buenos Aires, Argentina
- Education: University of Buenos Aires
- Occupation: Actor
- Years active: 1995-present
- Height: 1.65 m (5 ft 5 in)
- Partner: Ailen Cibello (2010-present)
- Relatives: Noelia Castaño (Sister)

Ezequiel Castaño (born December 4, 1981) is an Argentine actor.

== Biography ==
Ezequiel Castaño was born on December 4, 1981, in Buenos Aires, Argentina. Ezequiel Castaño is the brother of the actress, Noelia Castaño. Ezequiel Castaño studied a Bachelor of Combined Arts at the University of Buenos Aires. He studied acting with Norman Briski.

== Personal life ==
Since 2010, Ezequiel Castaño is in a relationship with the photographer, Ailen Cibello.

== Career ==
Ezequiel Castaño began his career in television in 1995. From 1995 to 1998, he was part of the cast of the youth television series Chiquititas. Between 1996 and 1998, he made the theatrical seasons of Chiquititas. From 1999 to 2000, he was part of the cast of the youth television series Verano del '98. In August 2001, he makes a small participation in the youth television series Chiquititas. In 2001, he was summoned by Cris Morena for the special Chiquititas de Oro where she and the most prominent of all seasons came together to receive the award Chiquititas de Oro. In 2002, he was part of the cast of the television series Franco Buenaventura, el profe. In 2004, he makes a small participation in the youth television series Floricienta. In 2004, he makes a small participation in the television series Los Roldan. In 2005, he makes a small participation in the television series Amor mío. In 2007, he makes a small participation in the youth television series Casi Ángeles. In 2008, he was part of the cast of the television series Aquí no hay quien viva. From 2009 to 2010, he was part of the cast of the television series Ciega a citas. From 2009 to 2010, he was part of the cast of the television series Botineras. In 2011, he was part of the cast of the television series Maltratadas. In 2012, he was part of the cast of the television series Invasión Salamone. In 2013, he made his film debut, with the movie Mala. In 2018, he makes a small participation in the television series Golpe al corazón. In 2020, he makes a small participation in the television series Separadas.

== Filmography ==
=== Television ===
Year	Title	Character	Channel
1995-1998	Chiquititas	Cristián "Mosca" Gómez	Telefe
1999-2000	Verano del '98	Lucio Herrera	Telefe
2001	Chiquititas	Cristián "Mosca" Gómez	Telefe
2002	Franco Buenaventura, el profe	Agustín Marzoa	Telefe
2004-2005	Floricienta	Pirate	Canal 13
2004	Los Roldán		Telefe
2005	Amor mío		Telefe
2007	Casi Ángeles	Alberto "Albertito" Paulazzo	Telefe
2008	Aquí no hay quien viva	Carlos Saúl Guerra	Telefe
2009-2010	Ciega a citas	Santiago Ugly	TV Pública
2009-2010	Botineras	Gonzalo "Lalo" Roldán	Telefe
2011	Maltratadas	Damián	América TV
2012	Invasión Salamone	Gonzalo	Independiente
2018	Golpe al corazón		Telefe
2020	Separadas	Luciano Alberto Villa	Telefe

=== Theater ===
Year	Title	Character	Director	Theater
1996-1998	Chiquititas	Cristián "Mosca" Gómez	Cris Morena	Teatro Gran Rex
2004-2005	El castillo de Kafka		Miguel Guerberof	Teatro del Abasto

=== Television programs ===
Year	Program	Channel	Notes
1997	Hola Susana, te estamos llamando	Telefe	Guest
1997-1998	Almorzando con Mirtha Legrand	Canal 13	Guest
1997-1998	Videomatch	Telefe	Guest
1998	Susana Gimenéz	Telefe	Guest
1998	Nico R	Telefe	Guest
1999-2000	Sábado Bus	Telefe	Guest
2010	Caiga quien caiga	Telefe	Participant
2010	Susana Gimenéz	Telefe	Guest
2019	¿Quién quiere ser millonario?	Telefe	Participant

=== Movies ===
Year	Movie	Character	Director
2013	Mala		Israel Adrián Caetano
2020	Quemar las naves	Pedro Nogués	Rodolfo Carnevale

== Discography ==
=== Soundtrack albums ===
- 1995 — Chiquititas Vol. 1
- 1996 — Chiquititas Vol. 2
- 1997 — Chiquititas Vol. 3
- 1998 — Chiquititas Vol. 4
