= Natalia Melcon =

Argentine actress (born 1990)

- Born: Natalia Soledad Melcon Prado; December 17, 1990 (age 35); Buenos Aires, Argentina
- Occupation: Actress
- Years active: 1999-present
- Partner: Giovanni Simeone (2015-2017)
- Parent(s): Alejandro Melcon and Graciela Prado

Natalia Soledad Melcon Prado (born December 17, 1990) is an Argentine actress.

== Filmography ==
=== Television ===
Year	Title	Character	Channel
1999-2001	Chiquititas	Natalia Ramos Pacheco Acevedo	Telefe
2002	Kachorra	Roberta Ponce	Telefe
2003	Rincón de Luz	Natalia Toledo	Canal 9/América TV
2005	Amor Mío	Bárbara	Telefe
2010	Casi Ángeles	Aylen	Telefe

=== Television Programs ===
Year	Program	Channel	Notes
1999-2000	Sábado Bus	Telefe	Guest
1999-2001	Susana Gimenéz	Telefe	Guest
1999-2001	Videomatch	Telefe	Guest
2000-2001	Almorzando con Mirtha Legrand	Canal 13	Guest

=== Theater ===
Year	Title	Character	Director	Theater
1999-2001	Chiquititas	Natalia Ramos Pacheco Acevedo	Cris Morena	Teatro Gran Rex
2003-2004	Rincón de Luz	Natalia Toledo	Cris Morena	Nokia Arena

=== Movies ===
Year	Movie	Character	Director
2001	Chiquititas: Rincón de luz	Natalia Ramos Pacheco Acevedo	José Luis Massa

== Discography ==
=== Soundtrack albums ===
- 1999 — Chiquititas Vol. 5
- 2000 — Chiquititas Vol. 6
- 2001 — Chiquititas Vol. 7
- 2001 — Chiquititas: Rincón de Luz

== See also ==
- Chiquititas
- Chiquititas soundtracks
