= Nadia Di Cello =

Argentine actress

- Born: Nadia Mariel di Cello; January 20, 1989 (age 37); Buenos Aires, Argentina
- Occupation: Actress
- Years active: 1996–present
- Spouse: Fernando Migliano (m. 2019)
- Children: 2

Nadia Mariel di Cello (born January 20, 1989) is an Argentine actress who was born in Argentina and raised and developed her career in Argentina.

== Biography ==
Nadia Mariel di Cello was born on January 20, 1989, in Argentina. She has an older sister named Natalia di Cello.

== Career ==
Nadia di Cello, debuted as an actress in 1996 at age 7 in Chiquititas, being together with Camila Bordonaba the actresses that lasted the longest in the cast. Between 1996 and 2001, she made the theatrical seasons of Chiquititas. In 2001, she was summoned by Cris Morena for the special Chiquititas de Oro where she and the most prominent of all seasons came together to receive the award Chiquititas de Oro. In 2001, she was part of the cast of the film Chiquititas: Rincón de luz. In 2001, she made a special appearance with Sebastián Francini in the television program Poné a Francella. In 2002, she made a special appearance in the youth series Rebelde Way starring Camila Bordonaba, Felipe Colombo, Luisana Lopilato and Benjamín Rojas, where she played Florencia Fernández, the sister of Luna Fernández, a disabled girl whom her mother isolates. In 2003, she was part of the cast of the children's series Rincón de Luz starring Guido Kaczka and Soledad Pastorutti. Between 2003 and 2004, she made the theatrical seasons of Rincón de Luz. In 2006, she was part of the cast of the youth telenovela El Refugio de los Sueños. In 2015, she performed the play La vida prestada. In 2016, she performed the play Princesas rotas. In 2017, she was part of the cast of the miniseries Santos pecadores starring Daniela Cardone and Nazarena Vélez. In 2018, she was part of the cast of the film Huellas. In 2019, she performed the play Amoricia. In 2019, she starred in the play Casa Duarte.

== Personal life ==
On May 24, 2019, she married, Fernando Migliano in a civil ceremony. In 2010, she gave birth to the couple's first child, a boy, whom they called Valentino Migliano. On December 10, 2015, she gave birth to the couple's second child, a girl, whom they called Francesca Migliano. Nadia di Cello is a supporter of football club Boca Juniors. She has named Toy Story as her favourite film, Aaron Carter her idol and Shakira her favourite singer.

== Filmography ==
=== Television ===
Year	Title	Character	Channel
1996-1998	Chiquititas	Nadia Cáceres	Telefe
1999-2001	Chiquititas	María Fernández	Telefe
2001	Poné a Francella		Telefe
2002	Rebelde Way	Flor Fernández	Canal 9
2003	Rincón de Luz	Nadia Financio Fernández	Canal 9/América TV
2006	El Refugio de los Sueños	Silvana	Canal 13
2017	Santos pecadores		

=== Television Programs ===
Year	Program	Channel	Notes
1997-1998	Almorzando con Mirtha Legrand	Canal 13	Guest
1997	Hola Susana, te estamos llamando	Telefe	Guest
1997-2001	Videomatch	Telefe	Guest
1998	Nico R	Telefe	Guest
1998-2001	Susana Gimenéz	Telefe	Guest
1999	La Biblia y el calefón	Canal 13	Guest
1999	Tal para cual	Telefe	Guest
1999-2000	Sábado Bus	Telefe	Guest
2000-2001	Almorzando con Mirtha Legrand	Canal 13	Guest
2001	Maru a la tarde	Telefe	Guest
2013	Gracias por venir, gracias por estar	Telefe	Guest
2015	AM, antes del mediodía	Telefe	Guest
2016	Morfi, todos a la mesa	Telefe	Guest
2016	Mejor de noche	Canal 9	Guest
2019	Paso de todo	Argentinísima Satelital	Guest
2019	Cortá por Lozano	Telefe	Guest
2021	Está en tus manos	Canal 9	Guest

=== Theater ===
Year	Title	Character	Director	Theater
1996-1998	Chiquititas	Nadia Cáceres	Cris Morena	Teatro Gran Rex
1999-2001	Chiquititas	María Fernández	Cris Morena	Teatro Gran Rex
2003-2004	Rincón de Luz	Nadia Financio Fernández	Cris Morena	Teatro Gran Rex
2015	La vida prestada	Malena		Teatro Porteño
2016	Princesas rotas		Ezequiel Comeron	Teatro El Galpón de Guevara
2019	Amoricia	Inés	Ernesto Medela	Teatro Porteño
2019	Casa Duarte	Dora	Mercedes Sánchez	Teatro Porteño
2021	Trepadores	Lucrecia	Gustavo Lista	Teatro Buenos Aires

=== Movies ===
Year	Movie	Character	Director
2001	Chiquititas: Rincón de luz	María Fernández	José Luis Massa
2018	Huellas		Pablo Yotich

== Discography ==
=== Soundtrack albums ===
- 1996 — Chiquititas Vol. 2
- 1997 — Chiquititas Vol. 3
- 1998 — Chiquititas Vol. 4
- 1999 — Chiquititas Vol. 5
- 2000 — Chiquititas Vol. 6
- 2001 — Chiquititas Vol. 7
- 2001 — Chiquititas: Rincón de Luz
- 2003 — Rincón de Luz
