= Diego Mesaglio =

Argentine actor and singer

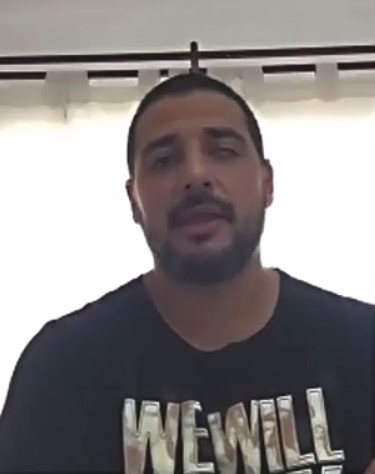
- Born: Diego Alberto Mesaglio; February 20, 1984 (age 41); Luján, Buenos Aires Province, Argentina
- Occupation(s): Actor and singer
- Years active: 1991–present
- Height: 1.78 m (5 ft 10 in)
- Partner: Mariana Seligmann (2003–2004)

Diego Alberto Mesaglio (born February 20, 1984) is a well known Argentine actor and singer.

== Career ==
Diego Mesaglio began his career in television with an advertisement for Banco Río in 1991. In 1994, he had a small participation in the television series Montaña Rusa. In 1994, he made his film debut, with the movie Amigomío. In 1995, he was part of the cast of the television series Amigovios. In 1995, he had a small participation in the television series Poliladron. From 1996 to 1998, he was part of the cast of the youth soap opera Chiquititas. In 1999, he was part of the cast of the television series Trillizos ¡dijo la partera!. From 1999 to 2000, he was part of the cast of the youth television series Verano del '98. In 2000, he was part of the cast of the television series Cabecita. In August 2001, he made a short lived return to Chiquititas. In 2001, he was summoned by Cris Morena for the special Chiquititas de Oro where he and the most prominent of cast members of every season came together to receive the award Chiquititas de Oro. From 2002 to 2003, he was part of the cast of the youth television series Rebelde Way. From 2004 to 2005, he was part of the cast of the youth television series Floricienta. In 2007, he was part of the cast of the television series Romeo y Julieta. From 2008 to 2009, he was part of the cast of the television series Por amor a vos. In 2009, he acted in the movie Matar a Videla. In 2010, he was part of the cast of the television series Yo soy virgen. In 2011, he was part of the cast of the television series Atrapados. In 2012, he makes a small participation in the television series Graduados. In 2013, he makes a small participation in the television series Solamente vos. In 2013, he acted in the movie Metegol. From 2013 to 2014, he was part of the cast of the television series Los Vecinos en Guerra. From 2017 to 2018, he was part of the cast of the television series Un gallo para Esculapio. From 2018 to 2019, he performed the play Se alquila with Chiquititas co-star Santiago Stieben.

== Health issues ==
Diego Mesaglio announced during 2016 that he had vision problems and needed a cornea transplant. He lost sight on his left eye when, after a home accident in which he got hit on his forehead, an alcohol bottle tipped over and fell on his eye.

== Filmography ==
=== Television ===
Year	Title	Character	Channel
1994	Montaña Rusa	Hawker	Canal 13
1995	Amigovios	Ramón Morales	Canal 13
1995	Poliladron	Cholo	Canal 13
1996–1998	Chiquititas	Guadalberto "Corcho" Tapón	Telefe
1999	Trillizos ¡dijo la partera!	Diego Scarpelli	Telefe
1999–2000	Verano del '98	Alí	Telefe
2000	Cabecita	Marcos González	Telefe
2001	Chiquititas	Guadalberto "Corcho" Tapón	Telefe
2002–2003	Rebelde Way	Guido Lassen	Canal 9/América TV
2004–2005	Floricienta	Damián "Bata" Medina Ramos	Canal 13
2007	Romeo y Julieta	Dante Brunelli	Canal 9
2008–2009	Por amor a vos	Ramiro	Canal 13
2010	Yo soy virgen	Lautaro Sánchez	
2011	Atrapados	Lucas	Yups Channel
2012	Graduados	"Urso"	Telefe
2013	Solamente vos	Thief No. 1	Canal 13
2013–2014	Los Vecinos en Guerra	Lorenzo "Lolo" Bermejo	Telefe
2017–2018	Un gallo para Esculapio	Tony	Telefe

=== Movies ===
Year	Movie	Character	Director
1994	Amigomío	Hernán	Jeanine Meerapfel and Alcides Chiesa
2009	Matar a Videla	Julián	Nicolás Capelli
2013	Metegol	Central Liso	Juan José Campanella

=== Theater ===
Year	Title	Character	Director	Theater
1996–1998	Chiquititas	Guadalberto "Corcho" Tapón	Cris Morena	Teatro Gran Rex
2002	Rebelde Way	Guido Lassen	Cris Morena	Teatro Gran Rex
2002–2003	Erreway		Cris Morena	
2018–2019	Se alquila		Alfonso Burgos	Teatro Buenos Aires

=== Television Programs ===
Year	Program	Channel	Notes
1997	Hola Susana, te estamos llamando	Telefe	Guest
1997–1998	Almorzando con Mirtha Legrand	Canal 13	Guest
1997–1998	Videomatch	Telefe	Guest
1998	Susana Gimenéz	Telefe	Guest
1998	Nico R	Telefe	Guest
1999–2000	Sábado Bus	Telefe	Guest
2013	Gracias por venir, gracias por estar	Telefe	Guest
2015	Los unos y los otros	América TV	Guest
2018	Confrontados	Canal 9	Guest
2019	PH, podemos hablar	Telefe	Guest
2019	Incorrectas	América TV	Guest
2019	S.T.O.	América TV	Guest
2019	Cortá por Lozano	Telefe	Guest

== See also ==
- List of Argentines
