= Patricia Maldonado (writer) =

Argentine-Brazilian writer (born 1956)

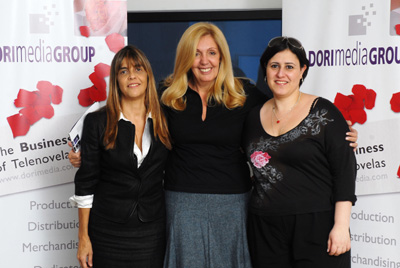
- Patricia Maldonado (in the middle) with Celina Amadeo and Michal Nashiv
- Born: Patricia Maldonado; June 12, 1956 (age 69); São Paulo, Brazil
- Occupation: Writer

Patricia Maldonado (born June 12, 1956, in São Paulo, Brazil) is an Argentine-Brazilian writer, who wrote scripts for Argentine television series such as Chiquititas, Verano del '98, Rebelde Way and Floricienta.

== Filmography ==
=== Writer ===
==== Television ====
- Chiquititas (1995–2001)
- Verano del '98 (1998–2001)
- Luna salvaje (2001)
- Chiquititas, la Historia (2001)
- Rebelde Way (2002–2003)
- Floricienta (2004)
- La Ley del silencio (2005)
- Floribella (2005)
- Champs 12 (2009)
- Dance! La Fuerza del Corazón (2011)

==== Film ====
- Chiquititas: Rincón de luz (2001)

=== Miscellaneous Crew ===
- De eso no se habla (1993) – secretary
- Rincón de Luz (2003) – literary coordinator
