= Mariana Seligmann =

Argentine actress (born 1984)

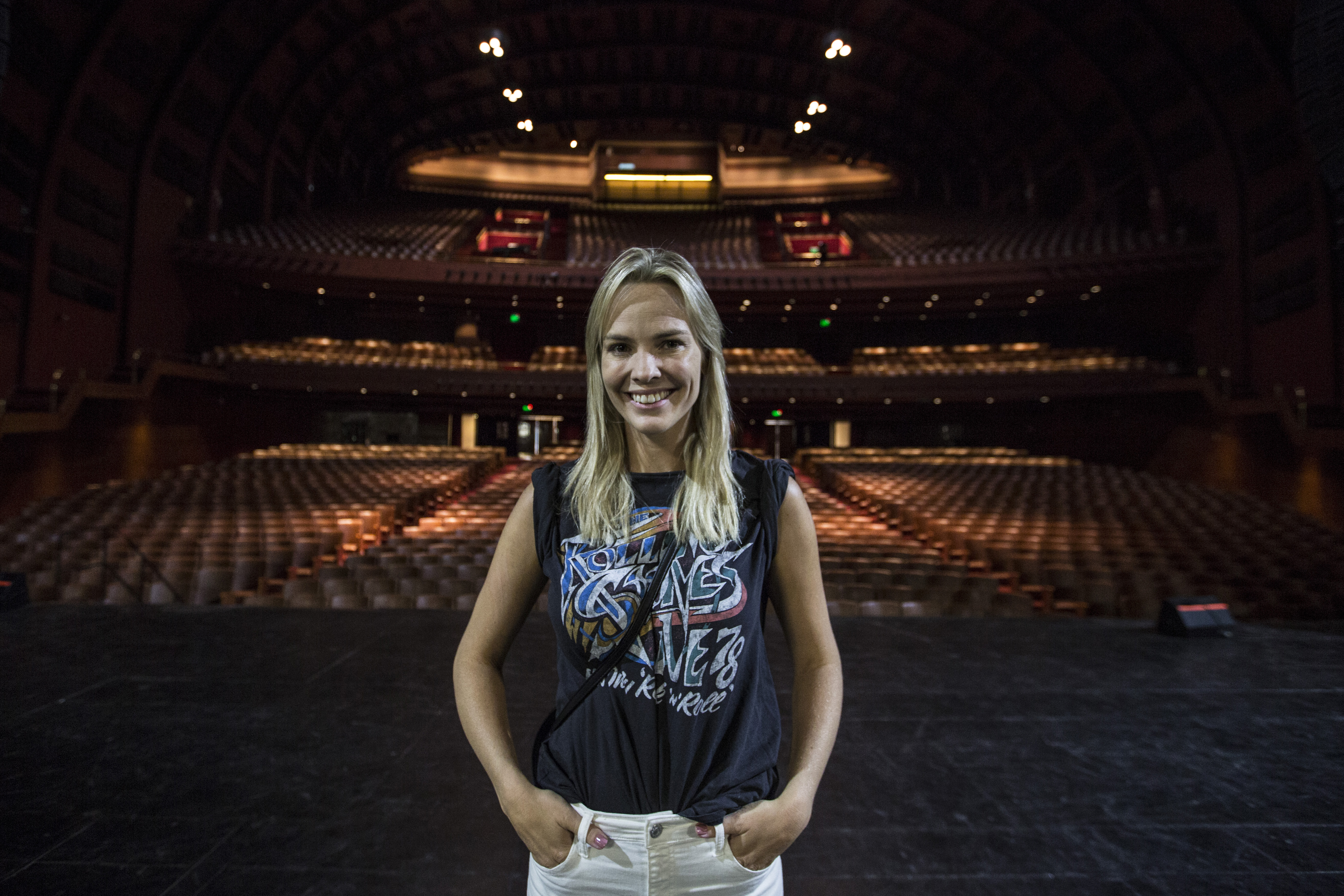
- Seligmann at the Teatro Gran Rex in 2017
- Born: October 9, 1984 (age 40); San Isidro, Buenos Aires, Argentina
- Occupations: Actress; Singer; Television presenter; Songwriter; Dancer; Model
- Years active: 2000-present
- Height: 1.73 m (5 ft 8 in)
- Spouse: Nicolás Naymark (m. 2017)
- Children: 2

Mariana Seligmann (born October 9, 1984) better known as Muni Seligmann is an Argentinian actress, singer, songwriter, dancer, television presenter and model.

== Biography ==
Mariana Seligmann maternal family is of German descent.

== Personal life ==
From 2003 to 2004, Mariana Seligmann was in a relationship with the actor Diego Mesaglio.

On December 14, 2017, she married in a civil ceremony with Nicolás Naymark, a businessman and on December 15, 2017, she got married in a religious ceremony with him. On March 29, 2021, she gave birth to the couple's first child, a girl, whom they called Carmela Naymark. On May 5, 2025, she gave birth to the couple's second child, a boy, whom they called Vicente Naymark.

== Career ==
=== Television career ===
Her professional career started in the year 2000 in the Television show Chiquititas. Thanks to her participation in this series, she gets a role in the musical La Bella y la Bestia.

In 2002, she made her film debut, with the movie Imagining Argentina.

In 2003, she was summoned by Cris Morena to be part of the cast of the youth television series Rebelde Way starring Camila Bordonaba, Felipe Colombo, Luisana Lopilato and Benjamín Rojas, she was also the back vocal and dancer on Erreway tours 2003 and 2004.

In 2004, she acted in theatre, in the play named O4, with Diego Mesaglio, Jorge Maggio and Belén Scalella.

In 2004, she was summoned by Cris Morena to be part of the cast of the youth television series Floricienta starring Florencia Bertotti and Juan Gil Navarro. Between 2004 and 2007, she made the theatrical seasons of Floricienta.

In 2005, she made a special appearance in the series Casados con Hijos.

In 2007, she was part of the cast of the horror film Left for Dead, she plays Michelle Black. In 2008, she was part of the cast of the horror film Dying God, where she plays Camila. In both films, she plays with Victoria Maurette. Both films are in English. Dying God is filming in France, and Left for Dead in United States and Argentina.

Later she entered the world of Disney thanks to the fact that Cris Morena recommended her to work in the children's show Winnie The Pooh and later in Disney Live! La magia de Mickey Mouse.

In 2009, she became a children's entertainer, joining Diego Topa in the successful cycle Playhouse Disney.

In 2010, she acted in theatre, in the play named Bella.

In 2015, she is the main antagonistic of the miniseries Novela Tuitera.

In 2018, she resumed acting as part of the second season of the youth television series O11CE. In 2018, she was summoned by the director Marcos Carnevale to be part of the cast of the play Sin filtro with Carola Reyna, Puma Goity and Carlos Santamaría.

=== Singing career ===
In 2016, she began her solo career with the release of her first single Mejor amigo.

In 2021, she publishes her first musical single, called Quiero darte. In 2021, she released her first solo musical album, titled Covers en la huerta.

== Filmography ==
=== Television ===
Year	Title	Character	Channel	Notes
2000	Chiquititas	Pilar	Telefe	
2003	Rebelde Way	Laura Arregui	Canal 9/América TV	
2004	Floricienta	Clara Alcántara	Canal 13	
2005	Casados con Hijos	Jimena Echagüe/Sabrina	Telefe	
2006	Conflictos en red	Carla "Luciana"	Telefe	"Episode 11: Amigos"
2015	La novela tuitera	Miranda	ESPN	
2018	O11CE	Alex	Disney Channel	

=== Theater ===
Year	Title	Character	Director	Theater
2000	Pigmalion			
2002	La Bella y la Bestia			
2003-2004	Erreway	Herself	Cris Morena	
2003-2004	04	María		Teatro Opera
2004	Floricienta en el Teatro	Clara Alcántara	Cris Morena	Teatro Gran Rex
2005	Mamma Mia!	Shopie		Teatro Don Bosco
2006	Parte de ti, el musical			
2006	Floricienta, el tour de los sueños	Clara Alcántara	Cris Morena	
2007	Floricienta, el tour de los sueños en México	Clara Alcántara	Cris Morena	
2007-2008	Winnie the pooh	Little messenger		
2008-2009	Disney Live! La magia de Mickey Mouse	Teacher		
2010-2011	La Casa de Disney Junior con Topa y Muni	Herself		Teatro Opera
2012	La casa de Disney Junior, Un Gran día con Topa y Muni	Herself		Teatro Gran Rex
2018-2019	Sin filtro		Marcos Carnevale	Teatro Paseo la Plaza

=== Movies ===
Year	movie	Character	Director
2003	Imagining Argentina	Daughter of Guzmán	Christopher Hampton
2006	Behind The Tress	Kate	
2007	Left for Dead	Michelle Black	Albert Pyun
2008	Dying God	Camila	Fabrice Lambot
2011	Hermanitos del Fin del Mundo	Pirucha	Julio Midú
2016	Doña Rosita la soltera	Rosita	Norma Angelieri

=== Television Programs ===
Year	Program	Channel	Notes
2009-2011	Playhouse Disney	Host	Playhouse Disney
2011-2012	La casa de Disney Junior	Host	Disney Junior
2018	C-Mag	Host	Disney XD

== Discography ==
=== Soundtrack albums ===
- 2004 — Floricienta
- 2007 — Floricienta
- 2010 — Lo mejor de Playhouse Disney
- 2010 — La casa de Playhouse Disney cantando con Topa y Muni
- 2011 — Hermanitos del fin del mundo
- 2011 — La casa de Disney junior con Topa y Muni

=== As lead artist ===
List of singles showing year released and album name
Title	Year	Album
"Mejor Amigo"	2016	Non-album singles
"Quiero darte"	2021	TBA
