= RGB Entertainment =

Argentinian production company

- Type: Production Company
- Industry: Television Production
- Founded: 2000
- Headquarters: Buenos Aires, Argentina
- Revenue: ▲$85.6 million USD (2009)
- Owner: Gustavo Yankelevich and Victor Gonzalez

RGB Entertainment is a production company from Argentina. It was established in the year 2000.

== History ==
It was created in 2000 by Gustavo Yankelevich, former Telefe director, and Victor Gonzalez, with headquarters in Buenos Aires, Argentina and São Paulo, Brazil. It includes creation and production of television shows, films, CDs, live events and multitudinous events.

The company co-produces all Cris Morena productions alongside Cris Morena Group since 2004. Projects together includes two cinematographic releases (Erreway: 4 Caminos and Chiquititas: Rincon de luz, based on TV shows Rebelde Way and Chiquititas), six TV shows (Floricienta, Amor Mio, Casi Angeles, Alma Pirata, Chiquititas 2006, ByB), seven live musicals (Floricienta in 2004 and 2005, Chiquititas in 2006, Casi Angeles in 2007, 2008 and 2009 and the Argentine production of Spring Awakening for 2010) and three unreleased projects (Blake & Jake, produced for the international market, cell-phone novela Atr@pados and Niños de Cristal). Other projects with Cris includes Internet channel yups.tv and the store Fans Store.

The products of this company are shown in the most important channels in Spain, Portugal, Mexico, Brazil, Chile, Venezuela, Uruguay and Israel.

RGB Entertainment managed the Disney Channel in Latin America from 2002 to 2005. It also manages Radio Disney in Argentina, Chile, Paraguay and Uruguay and all the Disney on Ice and Disney on Stage productions in South America (including Brazil). It also produced all Latin American versions of Playhouse Disney (Mexico, Argentina and Brazil) and also all the European versions until around 2007, including the British, Italian and Spanish versions. The company also produced the reality High School Musical A Seleção for the Brazilian market (in Argentina it was produced by Ideas de Sur).

RGB's first highly successful production was the Argentina version of Australian reality show Popstars. It was so successful, the company got the rights to produce the shows in all Latin America. It produced versions in Brazil and Mexico and managed all the bands formed in the show, including Bandana, Rouge, Br'oz and Mambrú.

== Soap operas ==
- Casi Angeles (Almost Angels) – 2007–2010
- Chiquititas (Tiny Angels) – 2006
- Alma Pirata (Pirate Soul) – 2006
- Floricienta – 2004–2005
- Amor Mio (My Love) – 2005
- Jake & Blake – 2009–2010

(all co-produced with Cris Morena Group and created by Cris Morena).

== Novelettes ==
- Arbre toes Josh (DECORATION) – 2003
- Karachi – 2002 ESCALATE DEPORTATIONS
- Provocative – 2001 ACCORDION EN LA DENTIST

Novelette Bare la coca Open your Eyes Karachi Carissa

- Provo came – 2001

Karachi eel show DE aux

== Talk show ==
- Somos como somos (We are what we are) – 2004

== Entertainment ==
- Sabelotodo (You know everything) – 2005
- Blef - 2005

== Reality shows ==
- Escalera a la fama (Stairway to Fame) – 2003
- Popstars (in Argentina, Brazil, Mexico and Colombia)
- The Amazing Race en Discovery Channel (Season 1 only) – 2009
