= Guillermo Santa Cruz =

Argentine actor and economist

- Born: Guillermo Óscar Santa Cruz; January 6, 1984 (age 42); Buenos Aires, Argentina
- Occupations: Actor and economist
- Years active: 1990–2012

Guillermo Óscar Santa Cruz (born January 6, 1984) is an Argentine actor who has a degree in economics.

== Biography ==
In 2004 he traveled to China with his family. Soon after, his family returned to Argentina, Guillermo decided to stay to study Mandarin Chinese in depth and pursue a Bachelor's Degree in Economics. After graduating, he worked at the Argentine Embassy in Beijing. After eight years of residence in China, he returned to Argentina in 2012. He completed a Master's Degree in Agribusiness and Food and served as an external consultant in the Ministry of Agriculture, Livestock and Fisheries of the Nation in different economic and commercial development projects.

Santa Cruz works at the Industrial and Commercial Bank of China.

== Career ==
Guillermo Santa Cruz began his career in the television series Quiero gritar que te amo in 1990. In 1991, he was part of the cast of the television series ¡Grande, pa!. In 1991, he was part of the cast of the television series Cosecharás tu siembra. In 1991, he was part of the cast of the television series El árbol azul. In 1993, he was part of the cast of the television series El club de los baby sitters. In 1994, he was part of the cast of the television series Más allá del horizonte. In 1994, he was part of the cast of the television series Inconquistable corazón. In 1995, he was part of the cast of the television series Dulce Ana. From 1996 to 1999, he was part of the cast of the youth television series Chiquititas. Between 1996 and 1999, he made the theatrical seasons of Chiquititas. In August 2001, he makes a small participation in the youth television series Chiquititas. In 2001, he was summoned by Cris Morena for the special Chiquititas de Oro where he and the most prominent of all seasons came together to receive the award Chiquititas de Oro. In 2002, he was part of the cast of the youth television series Rebelde Way. In 2002, he was part of the theatrical season of Rebelde Way.

== Filmography ==
=== Television ===
Year	Title	Character	Channel
1990	Quiero gritar que te amo		Gems Televisión
1991	¡Grande, pa!		Telefe
1991	Cosecharás tu siembra		Canal 9
1991	El árbol azul	Guille	Canal 13
1993	El club de los baby sitters		
1994	Más allá del horizonte	Juan	Canal 9
1994	Inconquistable corazón		Canal 9
1995	Dulce Ana	Mario Iturbe-Montalbán	Canal 9
1996–1998	Chiquititas	Guillermo Estevez	Telefe
1999	Chiquititas	Javier Maza	Telefe
2001	Chiquititas	Guillermo Estevez	Telefe
2002	Rebelde Way	Nicolás Provenza	Canal 9

=== Theater ===
Year	Title	Character	Director	Theater
1996–1998	Chiquititas	Guillermo Estevez	Cris Morena	Teatro Gran Rex
1999	Chiquititas	Javier Maza	Cris Morena	Teatro Gran Rex
2002	Rebelde Way	Nicolás Provenza	Cris Morena	Teatro Gran Rex

== Discography ==
=== Soundtrack albums ===
- 1996 — Chiquititas Vol. 2
- 1997 — Chiquititas Vol. 3
- 1998 — Chiquititas Vol. 4
- 1999 — Chiquititas Vol. 5
