= Amor mío (Mexican TV series) =

Mexican television series

- Based on: Amor mío by Romina Yan & Cris Morena
- Written by: Mauricio Jaliffe
- Directed by: Eric Morales
- Starring: Raúl Araiza; Vanessa Guzmán; Manuel "Flaco" Ibáñez; Rosa María Bianchi
- Opening theme: "Amor mío" by Grupo Play
- Country of origin: Mexico
- Original language: Spanish
- No. of seasons: 2
- No. of episodes: 230

Production
- Executive producers: Roberto Gómez Fernández; Giselle González
- Producer: Hernán Pérez Oneto
- Editors: Fabio Prepelitchi; Luis E. Pérez
- Camera setup: Multi-camera
- Production company: Televisa

Original release
- Network: Canal de las Estrellas
- Release: August 14, 2006 – January 4, 2008

Amor mío is a Mexican telenovela produced by Roberto Gómez Fernández and Giselle González for Televisa. The series is an adaptation of the Argentine telenovela of the same name created by Romina Yan & Cris Morena. Vanessa Guzmán and Raúl Araiza star as the protagonists, while Rosa Maria Bianchi and Manuel "Flaco" Ibáñez star as the co-protagonists.

== Plot ==
The story revolves around Abril and Marcos, two people with completely opposite personalities. She is restless, outgoing, cheerful, as he is a lover of order, tranquility and a home life that loves having people encounters of the second kind. Living together is not easy and is worse when both try to hide the attraction that arises between them.

== Series overview ==
| Season | Episodes | Originally released | |
| Season | Episodes | First released | Last released |
|---|---|---|---|
| 1 | 150 | August 14, 2006 | March 16, 2007 |
| 2 | 80 | September 17, 2007 | January 4, 2008 |

== Cast ==
- Vanessa Guzmán as Abril Juárez Casallego
- Raúl Araiza as Marcos Sinclair
- Manuel "Flaco" Ibáñez as Andrés Sinclair
- Rosa María Bianchi as Maggie Casallego vda. de Juárez
- Ricardo Fastlicht as Felipe Gómez
- Verónica Jaspeado as Vera Esmeralda
- Juan Carlos Colombo as Ricardo Saenz/Augusto Monrraz
- Nora Velázquez as Sara Parra Andaluz
- Uberto Bondoni as Santiago Legorreta
- Marcela Ferradás as Inés Ibañez
- Wendy González as Violeta Sinclair
- Thaly Amezcua as Betty
- Masaya Candelario as Leila
- Patricio Borghetti as Javier Martínez Andaluz
- Isabel Macedo as Daniela Sánchez
