= Sebastián Francini =

Argentine actor and singer

- Born: Sebastián Javier Francini; 8 September 1989 (age 35); Merlo, Argentina
- Occupation(s): Actor and singer
- Years active: 1997–present

Sebastián Javier Francini (born 8 September 1989) is an Argentine actor and singer.

== Biography ==
Sebastián Javier Francini was born on 8 September 1989, in Merlo, Buenos Aires Province, Argentina. Sebastián Francini is the son of Claudio and Martha. A child actor, Francini began acting professionally at age four. After being cut from the popular children's telenovela program Chiquititas, Francini reinvented himself as a theatre and television actor.

== Filmography ==
=== Television ===
Year	Title	Character	Channel
1997	Cada día te quiero más		Canal 13
1998	Chiquititas	Nacho	Telefe
1999–2001	Chiquititas	Sebastián Mansilla	Telefe
2000	El nieto de Don Mateo		Canal 9
2001	Poné a Francella		Telefe
2002–2003	Máximo corazón	Tommy	Telefe
2004	Frecuencia 04	Maxi	Telefe
2007	Romeo y Julieta	Octavio Burman	Canal 9

=== Theater ===
Year	Title	Character	Director	Theater
1998	Chiquititas	Nacho	Cris Morena	Teatro Gran Rex
1999–2001	Chiquititas	Sebastián Mansilla	Cris Morena	Teatro Gran Rex
2003	El Principito: Una aventura musical	The little Prince	Eduardo Gondell	Teatro Gran Rex
2004	El Príncipe de la Cenicienta	The Prince		Teatro Broadway
2005	Camino a Broadway		Sergio Troglia	Teatro Broadway
2006	El Príncipe Azul de Cenicienta	Prince Damián	Liliana Barrionuevo	Auditorium Baúen
2007	Pasión Bohemia		Valeria Lynch	Ciudad Cultural Konex
2008	El Regreso del Joven Príncipe			La Rural
2010	Anastasia	Dimitri	Diego Veronesi	Teatro Premier
2013	Rapunzel, una aventura muy descabellada	The Prince	Juan C. Gallego	Teatro 3 de Febrero
2013–2014	El Principito: Una aventura musical	Businessman/King	Eduardo Gondell	Teatro Coliseo and Auditorio Belgrano
2015	El Club del Chamuyo	Ken	Ezequiel Sagasti	Teatro Porteño
2015	Descuidistas		Ezequiel Sagasti	Teatro Porteño
2016	Cruising	Dante	Julián Arenas	Teatro Porteño
2016	MIQVA, Me imagino que vendrás acompañado		Julián Arenas	Teatro Porteño
2016	Cruising, reloaded	Dante	Julián Arenas	Teatro Porteño and Teatro El Bombín
2016	Romeo y Julieta: Una historia de rock	Romeo	Belisario Román	Teatro Porteño
2016	El tango es puro cuento		Ignacio González Cano	Ciudad Cultural Konex
2016	El Club del Chamuyo: El musical	Ken	Ezequiel Sagasti	Teatro Metropolitan
2016	Circo Aventuras, Al rescate		Gustavo Enrietti and Victoriano Pololla	Lomas de Zamora
2016–2017	Beatnik: Una historia verídica	Lucien Carr	Osvaldo Laport	Teatro Maipo Kabaret
2019	Madre coraje		José María Muscari	Teatro La Comedia

=== Television Programs ===
Year	Program	Channel	Notes
1998	Almorzando con Mirtha Legrand	Canal 13	Guest
1998	Nico R	Telefe	Guest
1998–2001	Videomatch	Telefe	Guest
1998–2001	Susana Gimenéz	Telefe	Guest
1999–2000	Sábado Bus	Telefe	Guest
2000–2001	Almorzando con Mirtha Legrand	Canal 13	Guest
2001	Maru a la tarde	Telefe	Guest
2004	Sabor a mí	Telefe	Guest
2005	Susana Gimenéz	Telefe	Guest
2006	Oye mi canto	América TV	Participant

=== Movies ===
Year	Movie	Character	Director
2000	Papá es un Ídolo	Martín	Juan José Jusid
2001	Chiquititas: Rincón de luz	Sebastián Mansilla	José Luis Massa
2003	Un hijo genial	Tommy	
2008	Valentina	Fede	Eduardo Gondell

== Discography ==
- 1998 — Chiqutitias Vol. 4
- 1999 — Chiqutitias Vol 5.
- 2000 — Chiqutitias Vol. 6
- 2001 — Chiquititas Vol. 7
- 2001 — Chiquititas: Rincón de Luz

== Awards and nominations ==
Year	Award	Category	Work	Result
1999	Martín Fierro Awards	Best Child Actor	Chiquititas	Winner
2000	Martín Fierro Awards	Best Child Actor	Chiquititas	Nominated
