= Diego García (actor) =

Argentine actor

- Born: Diego García Salas; 8 February 1983 (age 42); Buenos Aires, Argentina
- Occupation(s): Actor, singer
- Years active: 1996–2011

Diego Emmanuel García (born 8 February 1983) is an Argentine actor. His most well-known roles were that of Marcos Aguilar in Cris Morena's television series Rebelde Way and Martín "Barracuda" Acosta in Chiquititas. In Chiquititas, he starred alongside Camila Bordonaba for two seasons (1997—1998) to form one of the Chiquititas' fan-favorite couples.

More recently, he works as riding master.

== Filmography ==
Film
Year	Title	Role	Notes
2000	Sé quién eres	Hermano Álvaro	
Television
Year	Title	Role	Notes
1996	Como pan caliente	Boy	Cameo Appearance
1997—1999	Chiquititas	Martín Barracuda	
1999	Trillizos, ¡dijo la partera!	Javier Gallardo	
2001	Chiquititas	Martín	
2002—2003	Rebelde Way	Marcos Aguilar	
2004	Floricienta	Chucky	
2007	Romeo y Julieta	Juan Monaguillo	
2008—2009	Libro de familia	Diego	
2011	El color del pecado	Sebastián	
Theatre
Year	Title	Role	Notes
2001	Chiquititas	Martín Barracuda	Adaptation of Chiquititas
	Rebelde Way	Marcos Aguilar	Adaptation of Rebelde Way
2005	Floricienta	Chucky	Adaptation of Floricienta

== Discography ==
=== Soundtrack albums ===
- 1997 — Chiquititas Vol. 3
- 1998 — Chiquititas Vol. 4
- 1999 — Chiquititas Vol. 5
- 2004 — Floricienta
- 2007 — Romeo y Julieta
