= Melcon =

Melcon or Melcón is a Spanish surname. Notable people with the surname include:

- Bernardino Álvarez Melcón (1903–1936), Spanish Augustinian priest and doctor of law
- María Luz Melcón (1943–2019), Spanish writer
- Natalia Melcon (born 1990), Argentine actress
- Ramón Melcón (1900–1973), Spanish journalist, football referee, and manager
