= Carlos Pedevilla =

Argentine actor

Carlos Pedevilla (born 1985) is an Argentine actor. Pedevilla is perhaps better remembered for his characterization of Coco in the Telefe production, Chiquititas.

Pedevilla made his television acting debut in El Arbol Azul (The Blue Tree), where he had the opportunity to work alongside Andrea Del Boca.

During the 1990s, he acted in Chiquititas, as Georgina Mollo's Georgi's romantic interest. While Coco and Georgi dated, Coco generally despised the rest of the children living in the Chiquititas orphan home.

After leaving Chiquititas, Pedevilla retired from acting on the screen.

Pedevilla became a politician and has returned to acting, participating in several theatrical plays.

== See also ==
List of Argentines
