= Valeria Díaz =

Argentine actress and singer

- Born: Valeria Rocío Díaz; 27 December 1984 (age 41); Buenos Aires, Argentina
- Other names: Valeria Arca
- Occupations: Actress; singer
- Years active: 1994–1998
- Spouse: Julio Arca
- Children: 2

Valeria Rocío Díaz (born 27 December 1984) is an Argentine former actress and singer.

== Career ==
She debuted as a television actress during 1994, in the program "Cara Bonita". In 1995 she joined "Parchis" a popular Children musical group (not to be confused with the Spanish children's band of around the same era), as a singer. In 1997, she left Parchis and began to play "Delfina" in a Telefe telenovela, "Chiquititas".

Díaz retired from acting in 1998.

== Personal life ==
Díaz is married to former Argentine football player Julio Arca, and together, they have two children.

== Filmography ==
=== Television ===
Film
Year	Title	Role	Notes
1994	Cara Bonita		
1997–1998	Chiquititas	Delfina	protagonista infantil

== See also ==
- List of Argentines
