= Susana Lanteri =

Argentine actress (1935–2021)

- Born: 8 May 1935; Buenos Aires, Argentina
- Died: 5 September 2021 (aged 86); Buenos Aires, Argentina
- Occupation: Actress

Susana Lanteri (8 May 1935 – 5 September 2021) was an Argentine actress of film, stage and television.

== Biography ==
Lanteri was born on 8 May 1935 in Buenos Aires. She studied acting under Juan Carlos Genet, Augusto Fernández and Alberto Ure. In 1963, she made her theatrical debut in the play Andorra. In 1965, she joined the Argentine Actors Association. She began appearing on television in 1969 and made her film debut in 1971, with a full filmography of more than 50 roles in films and series. Among her roles are Senor Olga in the telenovela María de nadie (1985) starring Grecia Colmenares, Elena Krüegger in the series Chiquititas (1997-1998), Ines Sabala in the series Mujeres asesinas (2006) and others. Her stage work included roles in productions of modern and classical theater - "Erma" by Federico García Lorca, "The Trojan Women" by Euripides, "Hedda Gabler" and "A Doll's House" by Henrik Ibsen, and others. Her last appearance on stage was a role in the production of "Esther's Inheritance" in 2017.

== Death ==
Lanteri died in Buenos Aires on 13 August 2021 at the age of 86 after a long illness.
