= Polyana López =

Argentine actress

Polyana López (born circa 1985) is an Argentine actress who gained fame as "Mora" in Telefe's acclaimed program, Chiquititas.

López is a black actress, daughter of Afro-Brazilian father and Argentine mother. Black people are extremely rare in Argentina, and therefore in its television and show business industry.

López's first experience as an actress came in Chiquititas, which, in turn, gave her national and international fame, becoming a number one hit in Argentina and across the rest of Latin America, as well as in some European and Asian countries, being dubbed into English and Russian, for example.

Polyana López played "Mora" for one year, 1997. However, upon leaving the Chiquititas telenovela in 1998, and with a copyright lawsuit between Argentina's Telefé and a Brazilian television network notwithstanding, she went to Brazil and acted in Chiquititas Brazil, as "Pollyana" the same character which she played on Argentine version.

López toured across Brazil playing "Pollyana" on theater as well during this period. During a trip to Brasília, she and the rest of the cast of Chiquititas Brazil were greeted by a crowd of 35,000 people as they tried to make their way into a restaurant, needing to have an entire street closed by local police before they could make their way into the restaurant (in Portuguese).

Polyana López has been retired from television acting since her days as a member of Chiquititas.
