= El árbol azul =

- Directed by: Alfredo Galiñares
- Opening theme: "El milagro de la vida" by Xuxa
- Country of origin: Argentina
- Original language: Spanish
- No. of episodes: 200

Production
- Producer: Alejandro Sessa

Original release
- Network: Canal 13
- Release: February 11, 1991 – 1992

El árbol azul ("The Blue Tree") is an Argentinian children's telenovela, originally broadcast in 1991–1992 on Canal 13.

== Cast ==
- Guido Kaczka as Daniel "Danny" Figueroa.
- Belén Blanco as Luciana Fernandez
- Paula D'Amico as Valeria Cardone.
- Facundo Espinosa as Federico "Fede".
- Eugenia Talice as Mariana.
- Mauro Martín as Miguel.
- Carlos Pedevilla as Francisco "Pancho" Fernández.
- Desiree Nagüel as María.
- Guillermo Santa Cruz as Guille.
- Paula Montel as Flor.
- Maximiliano Greco as Rafael.
- Matías Puelles as José.
- Natalia Perez as Verónica.
- Diego Bozzolo as Matías.
- Elvira Vicario as ?
- Horacio Dener as Don Juan.
- Andrés Vicente as Andrés Fernández.
- Morena Druchas as Morena Figueroa.
- Noelia Alegna as Ani.
- Pablo Albino as Tony.
- Martín Galigniana as Jorge.
- Victoria Onetto as Señorita Angélica.
- Monica Gonzaga as Mónica de Cardone.
- Antonio Caride as Roberto Cardone.
- Marzenka Novak as Carmen.
- Francisco Nápoli as Jose-Luis Figueroa.
- Ana María Caso as Delia de Figueroa.
- Raquel Albeniz as Teresa.
- Carlos Muñoz as Don Sebastián.
- Dora Baret as Teresa Visconti.
- Roberto Antier as Daniel Ferrero.
- Gustavo Bermúdez as Franco Ferrero.
- Andrea Del Boca as Celeste Verardi.
- Michelle Diehl - Michelle Gutiérrez.
- Sandra Dipp as Laura.
- Cristina Fernández as Mathilda.
- Roberto Fiore as Domenico Colacci.
- Mónica Galán as Antonia.
- Adela Gleijer as Aída Ferrero.
- Roberto Gonzalo as Ramón Tacone.
- Diego Greco as Tomás.
- Estela Kiesling as Magdalena.
- Carlos Larrache as Fernando Gutiérrez.
- Anahí Martella as Esther Tacone.
- Germán Palacios as Enzo Ferrero.
- Josefina Ríos as ?
- Abel Sáenz Buhr as Manuel.
- Susana Sisto as ?
- Juan Carlos Ucello as ?
- Beatriz Vives as Andrea.

== Adaptations ==
In 1998 the Mexican TV production company Televisa released its own adaptation of the telenovela. It was titled Una luz en el camino and starred Mariana Botas, Veronica Merchant, and Guillermo Capetillo.
