= Georgina Mollo =

Argentine actress (born 1983)

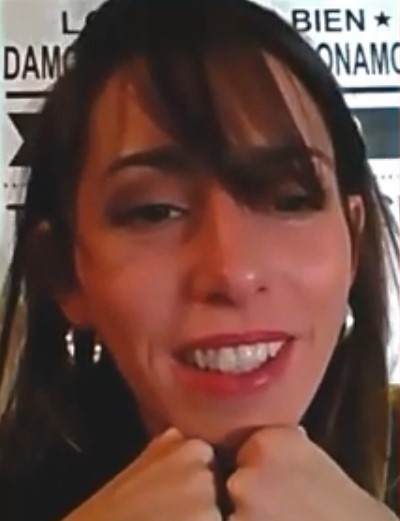
- Mollo in 2020
- Born: Georgina Mariel Mollo; 29 August 1983 (age 42); Buenos Aires, Argentina
- Occupations: Actress; singer; businesswoman
- Years active: 1995–2003; 2021–present
- Children: 3

Georgina Mariel Mollo (born 29 August 1983) is an Argentine actress, singer and businesswoman. She is best known for her participation in kid and teen-oriented television shows, such as "Chiquititas", where she played "Georgina (Georgi)".

== Career ==
When Mollo was 11, she had planned to go with her older sister to a casting that her sister was attending. It was raining, so her sister decided not to attend, but Mollo still went to the audition and she was chosen to play "Georgina" on Telefe's "Chiquititas", a youth-oriented telenovela produced by Cris Morena. Mollo was a main cast member of "Chiquititas" for three years, from 1995 to 1998. Mollo also acted in "Erreway" and in "Rincon de Luz", which is a movie based on "Chiquititas".

Mollo decided to retire from acting and became a children's clothes designer, but in 2021, she relaunched her acting career and has since acted in theater plays.

== Personal life ==
Mollo is very good friends with "Chiquititas" co-star Solange Verina.

After retiring from acting, she moved to Brazil.

Mollo is married and has three children.

== See also ==
- List of Argentines
