= Patricio Schiavone =

Argentine actor

Patricio Schiavone (born February 8, 1985) is an Argentine actor who is perhaps better known for his role as "Patricio" in Chiquititas, a child- and teenage telenovela.

Patricio Schiavone grew up as the only son Jorge Schiavone and his wife Graciela had. He admits to having a pampered childhood and enjoying the fact his parents gave him many things he asked for.

Schiavone's mother was a gymnastics teacher. Betina O'Connel. a well known actress in Argentina during the early 1990s, was a client of Schiavone's mother. O'Connel kept telling young Patricio that he was "made" to become a television star. After overhearing O'Connel talk about her career achievements, Schiavone finally became interested in acting, and he proceeded to tell his mom that he wanted to be on television.

His parents were supportive of Schiavone's decision. They took him to have some photographs done in order to create a portfolio. His parents signed him to a talent agency, and he was soon called to participate in various newspaper and magazine ads. He also acted in some theater plays and a short film.

His first experience as a television actor came in a show named Nico. He also participated in Decime Cuál, Cuál... ("Tell me Which One"). His participation on those shows, however, was limited to short sketches, and he did not gain fame from those shows.

In 1998, Alberto Fernández de Rosa, one of his co-stars in Chiquititas, chose him, after an audition, to join the show as "Patricio". Chiquititas by then had a large national and international fan base, and Schiavone quickly became a teen idol across Latin America. He also became known in Israel and Russia.

Schiavone lasted only one season at Chiquititas, and has not acted on television after that.

== Trivia ==
- Schiavone's Chiquititas character, Patricio, was a troublesome kid who had difficulty establishing friendships with the rest of the soap opera's characters.
- Schiavone lists Tom Cruise as his favorite actor, and Fito Páez as one of his favorite musicians.
- Schiavone participates in football, athletics and chess; he has won awards at those sports.
- Schiavone had two dogs.
- Schiavone lists Mar del Plata and Miramar, Argentina as his favorite places to vacation at.
