= Milagros Flores =

Argentine actress

Milagro Flores
- Occupation: Actress

Milagros Flores (born April 26, 1990) is an Argentine actress. She is best known for her participation in Chiquititas, a children's telenovela.

- 1999 — Chiqutitias Vol 5.
- 2000 — Chiqutitias Vol. 6
- 2001 — Chiquititas: Rincón de Luz
- 2003 — Rincón de Luz
