= Sofía Recondo =

Argentine actress and fashion model (born 1985)

- Born: Sofía Natalia Recondo; 2 December 1985 (age 39); Buenos Aires, Argentina
- Occupation(s): actress, model
- Years active: 1997–2001

Sofía Natalia Recondo (born 2 December 1985) is an Argentine actress who appeared in over 600 episodes of the TV series Chiquititas.

Recondo was a child when she was hired to play "Lucía" in "Chiquititas", a telenovela that was produced by Telefé. Recondo debuted as an actress on "Chiquititas" in 1998. "Lucía" was an orphaned teenager who was overprotected by her grandmother, and who had no contact with children her age. "Lucía" represented a challenge for the young actress: Since "Lucía" had been kept apart by her grandmother for so long, she lacked speech skills and enjoyed playing with children who were much younger than her, although she found a friend and, later on, romantic interest in "Roña", a character who was "Lucía"'s age and who helped "Lucía" make friends with the older children living in the orphanage house. Because of "Lucía"'s limits, Recondo acted both as a mute and as a (seemingly) mentally challenged child at the same time.

Sofía Recondo left "Chiquititas" in 1999, and has been working as a model ever since. Unlike many of her "Chiquititas" co-stars, Recondo has not participated in other "Chiquititas" related films or television shows, and she has not returned to television since her stint as a member of the "Chiquititas" cast.

== Filmography ==
=== Television ===
Year	Program	Role
1997–1998	Chiquititas	Lucia Krueger
1999	Chiquititas	Anita
2001	Chiquititas	Lucia Krueger

=== Theatre ===
Year	Program	Role
1998–1999	Chiquititas	Lucia Krueger
