= Dying God =

- Theatrical release poster
- Directed by: Fabrice Lambot
- Screenplay by: Nicanor Loreti; Germán Val; Jean Depelley; Fabrice Lambot
- Story by: Fabrice Lambot; Uriel Barros
- Produced by: Jean-Pierre Putters; Uriel Barros
- Starring: James Horan; Lance Henriksen
- Cinematography: José María Gómez
- Edited by: Guille Gatti
- Music by: Sup
- Distributed by: Green Apple
- Release date: July 2008
- Running time: 85 minutes
- Countries: Argentina; France
- Language: English
- Budget: $500,000

Dying God (also known as Final Spawn) is a 2008 Argentinian–French horror-science fiction film directed by Fabrice Lambot and produced by Jean Pierre Putters of Metaluna Productions France and Uriel tribes. Aided by a local pimp, Fallon attempts to stop the creature while dealing with his own issues.

== Cast ==
| Actor | Role |
|---|---|
| James Horan | Sean Fallon |
| Agathe de La Boulaye | Angel |
| Lance Henriksen | Chance |
| Misty Mundae | Mary |
| Enrique Liporace | Angelo |
| Victoria Maurette | Ingrid |
| Samuel Arena | Duncan |
| Louis Ballester | Nicky |
| Hugo Halbrich | Bennell |
| Iván Espeche | Ray |
| Brad Krupsaw | Gallagher |
| Kevin Schiele | Charlie |
| Mariana Seligmann | Camila |
| Maxime Seugé | Nano |
| Pablo Padilla | Suspect |
| Gabriela Cóceres | Steffie |
| Natasha Drivan | Lisa Douglas |
| Augusto Britez | Chaman |
| Nicolás Silvert | Kurupi Monster |
| Luciana Aguirre | 2nd Victim |
| Alejandro Vera | Strong Man |
| Guillermo Jauregui | Cab Driver |
| Silvina Quintanilla | Steffie's Mother |
| Patricia Juliá | Agonizing Victim |
| Uriel Barros | Bill Jhonson |
| Salvador Sanz | Strip Club Customer |

== Release ==
Green Apple released Dying God on DVD on December 10, 2010.

=== Reception ===
Scott Foy of Dread Central rated it 1.5/5 stars and called it "a cheap, dull, ugly-looking movie with ugly characters and a monster that remains uninspired despite the unsavory nature of this beast." Adam Arseneau of DVD Verdict criticized the film's premise and execution as being of poor quality. Adrian Halen of HorrorNews.net noted that the film had the look and feel of SyFy Channel original movie, with poor execution, and generic story.
