= Gustavo Guillén =

Argentine actor (1962–2020)

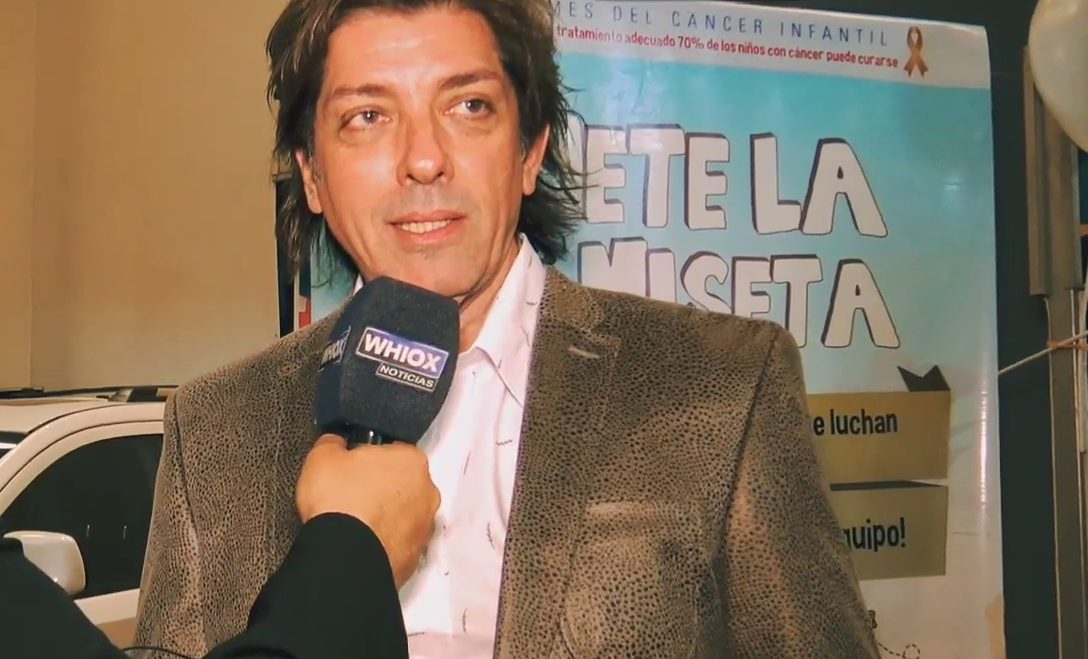
- Born: Gustavo Dasso; June 30, 1962; Buenos Aires, Argentina
- Died: May 28, 2020 (aged 57); La Plata, Argentina
- Spouse(s): Lorena Bruno (2000–2008), Luciana Abelanda (2013–?)
- Children: Valentino (b. 2004), Pedro (b. 2017)

Gustavo Guillén (June 30, 1962 — May 28, 2020) was an Argentine actor and musician. His real name was Gabriel Gustavo Dasso. Gustavo Guillén became famous for his roles in Argentina's soap operas. He was the drummer of the rock band Fuera de Peligro, and he performed in the theater.

== Telenovelas ==
- Amandote (1990)
- Manuela (1991)
- Micaela (1992)
- Perla negra (1994)
- Dulce Ana (1995)
- Ricos y famosos (1996)
- Mia solo mia (1997)
- Muñeca brava (1998)
- Chiquititas (1999)
- Amor latino (2000)
- Luna salvaje (2000)
- 099 central (2002)
- Mil millones (2002)
- La niñera (2004)
- Floricienta (2004–2005)
- Salvame Maria (2005)

== Personal life and death ==
Guillén was born Gabriel Gustavo Dasso on June 30, 1962, in Buenos Aires, Argentina.

Guillén married Argentina model Lorena Bruno in 2000 while he was working on "Amor Latino". They had one son, Valentino. On December 29, 2013, he married Luciana Abelanda; they later divorced. They had one son, Pedro.

Gabriel Gustavo Dasso died in La Plata, Buenos Aires Province, Argentina, on May 28, 2020, during a prostate operation.
