= Fabrice Lambot =

French film director and producer

Fabrice Lambot is a French film director and producer. He is most noted as director of the 2007 film Dying God, and as producer of the 2022 film Babysitter, which was a Canadian Screen Award nominee for Best Motion Picture at the 11th Canadian Screen Awards in 2023.
