= Romina Yan =

Argentinian television actress

- Born: Romina Yankelevich; 5 September 1974; Buenos Aires, Argentina
- Died: 28 September 2010 (aged 36); San Isidro, Buenos Aires, Argentina
- Occupations: Actress, singer, screenwriter, dancer
- Years active: 1991–2010
- Spouse: Darío Giordano (1998–2010)
- Children: 3
- Parent(s): Gustavo Yankelevich, Cris Morena

Romina Yankelevich (5 September 1974 – 28 September 2010), better known as Romina Yan, was an Argentine actress, screenwriter, singer and dancer. She made her television debut in the program Jugate Conmigo, and is most known for her portrayal of Belén Fraga in the internationally successful series Chiquititas (as well as on stage, in its annual musical presentations) created by her mother Cris Morena. She died in 2010, aged 36, after suffering a heart attack.

== Early and personal life ==
Romina Yankelevich was born in Buenos Aires, Argentina, to actors, television directors and television producers Gustavo Yankelevich and Cris Morena (née María Cristina de Giacomi). She was the elder sister of director, producer and screenwriter Tomás Yankelevich. Her father's family was of Jewish background.

Yan married technical producer Darío Giordano on 27 November 1998. They had three children.

== Career ==
Romina Yan's first appearance on Argentine television came during 1991, when the then sixteen-year-old appeared as a dancer in a show named Jugate Conmigo ("Come Play With Me"). Two years after that, in 1994, she made her debut as an actress, as "Lorena Picabea" in Mi Cuñado ("My Brother in Law"). Romina Yan continued working as a television actress when she played "Sol Iturbe" in another 1994 show, Quereme ("Love Me").

Towards the end of 1994, her mother was working on a deal with Argentina's largest television company, Telefe, to create a children's soap opera. Chiquititas was the story about the life of a group of orphaned children living in a manor known as Rincón de Luz. Yan starred in the show as Belén, the orphan house's director and a mother figure to the orphans. She also portrayed Belén on stage, in the show's annual musical presentations. Chiquititas catapulted Yan's celebrity status outside Argentina. She retired from the series in 1998, taking a hiatus before returning to Argentine television in 2000, when she played "Jessica" in one chapter of the suspense television program, Tiempo Final ("Final Moment"). She collaborated in 2001 alongside Susana Giménez in a variety show named after the latter.

She moved to the Argentine Andes later on that year to participate in her first film, Chiquititas: Rincón de Luz ("Corner of Light"), a Chiquititas feature film, once again portraying Belén. Yan also participated alongside Araceli Gonzalez and Puerto Rican singer Chayanne in Provocame ("Provoke Me") in 2001. Yan was hired by the Disney Channel in 2002, to host a children's show, Playhouse Disney, in Argentina. Playhouse Disney Argentina was produced by RGB, her father's company.

In 2003, she returned to acting, playing "Rocio Mazzini" in a soap opera titled Abre tus Ojos ("Open Your Eyes"). While not her first starring role in a telenovela, "Rocio Mazzini" represented for Yan her first starring role in a telenovela geared towards grown ups. She took a year off before returning to the small screens in Argentina, returning as "Abril Juarez" in 2005's Amor Mio ("My Love"). As of late 2007, she had been working on her mother's latest romantic comedy, Bella & Bestia.

== Death ==
On 28 September 2010, Yan suffered a heart attack and entered the Central Hospital of San Isidro at 4:30 pm, no longer with vital signs. An attempt was made to revive her for 50 minutes until her death was declared at 5.20 pm. The news of her death had the peculiarity that the scoop was given by a zonal means, Zona Norte Diario Online, and was disseminated by the national media. Several hours after the death of the actress, for fear that it was false news, the national media reported that hospital sources had revealed that the actress arrived dead from a cardiac arrest that "was not traumatic." According to the story, a friend took her to the hospital from Libertador and Alvear due to the discomfort of the young actress but it was too late. For 50 minutes they made many unsuccessful recovery attempts.

Her remains were released and buried in a private ceremony at the Del Pilar Cemetery. The same day that her remains were released, fans gathered at the Obelisco de Buenos Aires to pay tribute to the actress, with candles, flowers and posters that expressed messages of affection. The fans marched from the Obelisco to the Teatro Gran Rex, where Romina made much of her theatrical career.

== Repercussion ==
The Facebook page I can't believe Romina Yan has died (No puedo creer que murió Romina Yan) reached more than 150,000 members in less than two hours. The death was also the top trending topic of the day on Twitter. Cris Morena and Chiquititas were also trending topic through the day.

Telefe, the channel her father was in charge of during the late 1980s and 1990s, canceled its evening schedule. After Casi ángeles, the show produced by her mother, Telefe noticias, the channel's news program, aired a special 2 hours edition solely dedicated to her. The special achieved 18.3 points, the highest-rated edition of the show in four years. Canal 13, Argentina's number 2 net, also had a special 2 hours edition of its news show, Telenoche, which also achieve high ratings. With the exception of the news programs, all live shows in Argentina's biggest networks, Telefe and Canal 13, were not aired in tribute to Yan. The movie The Terminal replaced the live game-show Justo a tiempo in Telefe. A rerun of Policías en acción replaced Showmatch in Canal 13.

== Filmography ==
Year	Title	Role	Notes
1991	Jugate Conmigo	Herself	(TV Show)
1994	Quereme	Sol Iturbe	(TV Series)
1994	Mi Cuñado	Lorena Picabea	(TV Series)
1995-1998/2000/2001	Chiquititas	Belén Fraga	(TV Series)
1998	Susana Giménez	Herself	(TV Programme)
2000	Tiempo Final	Jéssica	(TV Series)
2001	Provócame	Marisol Anzoátegui	(TV Series)
2001	Chiquititas: Rincón de luz	Belén Fraga	
2002	¿Quién es Alejandro Chomski?	Herself	(TV Special)
2002	Playhouse Disney	Herself	(TV Show)
2003	Abre Tus Ojos	Rocío Mazzini	(TV Series)
2005	Amor Mío	Abril Juárez	(TV Series)
2008	B&B: Bella y Bestia	Bella	(TV Series)
2009	Casi Ángeles	Ariel	(TV Series)
2009	Horizontal/Vertical	Ana	(Movie)

== Discography ==
- 1995 — Chiquititas Vol. 1
- 1996 — Chiquititas Vol. 2
- 1997 — Chiquititas Vol. 3
- 1998 — Chiquititas Vol. 4
- 2001 — Chiqutitias: Rincón de Luz
