= Amigomío =

1994 film

- Film poster of Amigonio
- Directed by: Alcides Chiesa; Jeanine Meerapfel
- Written by: Alcides Chiesa; Pablo Bergel (novel)
- Starring: Mario Adorf; Daniel Kuzniecka; Diego Mesaglio; Debora Brandwajnman
- Release date: 1994
- Countries: Argentina; Germany
- Languages: Spanish; Quechua; Aymara; German

Amigomío is a 1994 Argentine film directed by Alcides Chiesa and Jeanine Meerapfel. Script written by Alcides Chiesa it was based on a novel by Pablo Bergel. The film was produced in a co-production with Germany. Mario Adorf appears as the grandfather of the young boy.

== Summary ==
A political activist from Argentina flees with his young son and embarks on an extensive journey across South America until they reach Ecuador.

== Cast ==
- Mario Adorf .... Grandfather
- Daniel Kuzniecka .... Papa
- Diego Mesaglio .... Amigomio
- Debora Brandwajnman .... Grandmother
- Atilio Veronelli .... Tony
- Manuel Tricallotis
- Christoph Baumann .... Christoph
- Hugo Pozo
- Gabriela Salas .... Negra
- Rodolfo Rodas
- Pablo Jully
- Ernesto Arias
- Luis Solanas
- Marcos Woinsky
- Eduardo Narvay
