= Gracias por venir, gracias por estar =

Gracias por venir, gracias por estar is an Argentine talk show.

== Awards ==
=== Nominations ===
- 2013 Martín Fierro Awards
  - Best general interest
