= Kachorra =

- Genre: Telenovela; Romantic comedy
- Written by: Gustavo Barrios; Diana Segovia
- Directed by: Jorge Montero; Miguel Colom
- Starring: Natalia Oreiro; Pablo Rago
- Opening theme: "Cuesta Arriba, cuesta abajo"
- Country of origin: Argentina
- Original language: Spanish
- No. of episodes: 150

Production
- Executive producer: Gabriel Fierro
- Production companies: Telefe; RGB

Original release
- Network: Telefe
- Release: May 20 – December 13, 2002

Kachorra is an Argentine family telenovela, produced by Telefe and RGB Entertainment in 2002, and protagonized by Natalia Oreiro and Pablo Rago.

== Production ==
The story was devised by Natalia Oreiro herself. She proposed it to Gustavo Yankelevich (a shareholder of RGB Entertainment, the company that produces the show), who ended up producing the novela, with some changes.

Kachorra meant a big comeback for Natalia Oreiro, the queen of soap operas, to the television after two years when she devoted herself to promoting her second musical album.

== Cast ==
- Natalia Oreiro – Antonia "Kachorra" Guerrero / Rosario Achával.
- Pablo Rago – Bruno Moravia.

etc.

== Awards ==
Year	Award	Category	Nominee	Result
2003	Martín Fierro Awards	Best Leading Actress in a Television Comedy	Natalia Oreiro	Nominated
2003	Martín Fierro Awards	Best Telenovela	Kachorra	Nominated
