= Chiquititas =

Argentine telenovela

- Also known as: Little ones
- Genre: Soap opera
- Created by: Cris Morena
- Written by: Gustavo Barrios; Patricia Maldonado; María José Campoamor; María Teresa Forero; Inmaculada Ruiz Santana
- Directed by: Claudio Ferrari; Martín Mariani; Hernan Abrahamsohn; Carlos Olivieri
- Opening theme: "Rechufas" (season 1) "Chufa Cha" (season 2) "Chufachon" (season 3) "Dame Una Ch" (season 4) "Siempre Chiquititas" (season 5) "Chiquititas 2000" (season 6) "Chiquititas Baila Así" (season 7)
- Country of origin: Argentina
- Original language: Spanish
- No. of seasons: 8 (total): 4 (Original series) 3 (New series) 1 (Reboot series)
- No. of episodes: 1186 (total): 155 (season 1) 206 (season 2) 175 (season 3) 153 (season 4) 173 (season 5) 144 (season 6) 10 (season 7) 170 (season 8)

Production
- Running time: 45 minutes
- Production companies: Cris Morena Group; Telefe

Original release
- Network: Telefe
- Release: 7 August 1995 – 8 December 2006

Related
- Chiquititas, la historia (2001); Chiquititas: Rincón de luz (2001 feature film); Rincón de luz (2003); Chiquititas Sin Fin; Chiquititas Brasil; Chiquititas (2013 Brazilian version); Chiquititas (Mexican version); Chiquititas (Portuguese version)

Chiquititas (literally translated as "Little Girls") is a children's musical Argentine soap opera, created and produced by Cris Morena. It starred Morena's daughter Romina Yan and Agustina Cherri.

The soap opera focuses on a group of orphans living in a manor known as Rincón de Luz. Their lives are gradually touched and changed by Belén, a tender-hearted, dedicated young woman. The story explores their experiences and coming-of-age dramas such as discovering first love, deceptions, sadness, loneliness, and friendship, as they form a family together. In the fifth season, the versions in Brazil, Israel, Romania, Greece, Portugal, and others were rebooted with a new setting, new characters, and a new story. The soap opera is complemented with musical themes and videos.

Chiquititas spawned three spin-offs, Cebollitas, Rincón de Luz, which aired in 2003 on Canal 9, and a 2006 production, Chiquititas Sin Fin, which aired on Telefe. Sin Fin, created to celebrate the series' 11th anniversary, later had versions in Portugal and Romania. A game based on Sin Fin was meant to be released for PS2 and Wii in 2009 but was cancelled.

Chiquititas has been aired in 25 countries and adapted for Brazilian and Mexican audiences. The series originally ran between 1995 and 2001, the year the show's feature film Chiquititas: Rincón de Luz was released.

== Plot ==
=== Season One – Chiquititas 1995 ===
Soon after Gabriela gave birth, the baby was taken away by her father, Ramiro Morán, a snobbish man who wasn't accepting that his daughter had a romance with one of their servants, so he told her the baby was stillborn. Ramiro sent the girl, Milagros, to the orphanage he had created, the "Rincón de Luz". Mili grows up there with eight other little girls who are actual orphans: Georgina, Cinthia, Vero, Michelle, Romina, Laura, and Maru. Spearheaded by Mili, the oldest among them, the seven chiquititas became a family. The girls are supervised by Ernestina, the rigorous janitor who is usually a victim of their pranks, and the adorable Spanish cook Saverio.

Season One cast, in 1995: Natalia Lobo, Gabriel Corrado, Romina Yan, and the chiquititas.

Emilia administrates the house, and is beloved by the orphans. Jimena is an orphan brought into the manor from the streets; though the girls welcome her, she doesn't get along with them at first until Mili calms her down; Mili and Jimena become good friends.

The girls' lives are touched by an adorable young woman named Belén who lives with her fumbling brother Felipe "Piojo", and her friends Leticia and Clarita. Together, they make a family for Sol, Leticia's little daughter. Belén, Leticia, and Clarita work for the Moráns' industries, and in the factory Belén meets Ramiro's oldest son Martín. Martín and Belén fall for each other, infuriating Ramiro, who tries to keep them apart because Belén is part of a lower social class. Belén and Martin help Mili search for her true identity, finding out the first clues about the little girl's past.

Martín is back from London because of his sister's emotional status. Over the years, Gabriela has lived in deep depression, believing her father's lies about her baby being dead. Her condition is gradually softened by Mili herself, both unaware of their blood ties. The Moráns' secret is also kept by Carmen, Ramiro's ambitious sister, who wants his fortune for her own. Carmen takes Emilia off her position as Rincón de Luz's administrator, assuming her place and frustrating the little girls. For Carmen's ire, Ramiro nominates his much-younger fiancée Ginette as the new administrator. Ginette feigns friendliness to the orphans, but she actually wants to assume their house, which Ramiro supposedly took from her father. Her intentions are eventually discovered by Jimena.

Ramiro blackmails Belén, making her break up with Martín. A repentant Ramiro decides to reveal the truth he has kept, but dies in a car crash. Believing she is no longer in love with him, Martín leaves with a now-sane Gabriela. Belén's sadness over his departure lessens when she meets Dr. Facundo Brausen after Jimena suffers a serious accident.

=== Season Two – Chiquititas 1996 ===
Carmen is once again Rincón de Luz's administrator. Facundo and Belén are in love, although she still misses Martín. Jime insists that her two friends Roña and Corcho are admitted into the manor as the first boys to live there. Carmen opposes this, but the Juvenile Court intervenes and allows them to stay, a decision that leads to Mosca's definitive return and the arrival of Guille. Erestina is replaced by Matilde, a smart and uncanny woman who discovers the secret about Mili and reveals it to Carmen, who lands in the hospital. In her absence, Belén assumes the position of administrator, struggling against the Court to stay with the children, using her social-assistance learning. She also becomes a mother to Sol after Leticia's sudden death, moving into the manor with the little girl and Clarita.

Clarita becomes a dance instructor to the little girls, and her skills lead her to become a professional dancer. Cinthia and Laura are adopted and new interns, such as Tamara and Mecha, increase the family inside the Rincón de Luz manor.

=== Season Three – Chiquititas 1997 ===
Carmen manages to close down the house and separate the group administered by Belén, but she and the kids receive help from the mysterious Pedro Vega, who donates his old mansion to them. Alongside Facundo, Piojo, and Tommy, Belén and the chiquititas find the huge, gorgeous manor at the corner of the Pasaje del Sauce. They're astonished by the attractive facade, but inside is a creepy place full of traps and secret passages; it's inhabited by a mysterious woman named Elena and her granddaughter Lucia. Belén introduces them to the Magic Window ("La Ventatina de los Sueños"), which allows them to gaze at their deepest dreams and illusions. Similar to the Window is the Magic Mirror, in which they must look with only one eye, to watch their dreams become true. The group gives the place a complete makeover and the Juvenile Court allows them to live there. Elena wants them out of there and far away from Lucia, so she torments them constantly. Roña discovers the little girl hidden in the inner parts of the manor, and he and Belén battle the hag to free her. Lucia gradually becomes part of the family, thanks to Roña.

The kids must also interact with new neighbors, starting feuds, making friends, and discovering first love: Jimena falls for Matías, and Mosca develops a troubled relationship with Delfina, the spoiled girl next door. Facundo moves to the house in front of the manor to become closer to Belén and the orphans. Belén and the kids receive a Brazilian orphan named Mora and a young boy named Nico who loves flying and aircraft and dreams of being reunited with his aircraft-pilot father.

However, their relationship as a group starts to be torn apart by Facundo's ex-fiancé Andrea and the unscrupulous Alejo Méndez Ayala, who wants his daughter Sol back.

Meanwhile, as Gabriela and Mili become closer each day, Carmen shadows them, trying to keep them from realizing their true ties.

Mili is still blind, so Gabriela invites her to live with her, feeling that her home is more secure than the manor. Mili despairs about leaving Belén, her best friend Jime, and the other chiquititas, until Jime realizes that it will be better for her. Carmen bond with ambitious orphan Caro understands it will be better for her. Carmen creates a bond with Caro, the ambitious orphan, to assume her place as Gabriela's real daughter. The girl desires everything Mili has, including her boyfriend Paul. But Belén discovers everything Carmen was trying to hide. At the Mothers Day, she receives a gift made by the grateful orphans and reunites them to tell the story behind the creation of the Rincón De Luz institution, revealing that Mili is the main reason for it. The girl becomes hysterically excited after finding out she finally found her family, but is hijacked by an angry Carmen. All the orphans' attempts to save Mili go wrong, but Carmen's final plan fails when Gabriela herself discovers the desperate captive girl. With mother and daughter reunited, Carmen is arrested and sent into rehabilitation, pleading for their forgiveness. Gabriela tells her they expect Carmen's regeneration so they can become a real family. Mili says goodbye to Belén, Jime, and the other chiquititas and leaves with her mother. Belén and the orphans then travel to Walt Disney World.

=== Season Four – Chiquititas 1998 ===
Belén and the orphans celebrate a party at their street, the Pasaje del Sauce, but the event is ruined by an unknown saboteur. Six new orphans (the older ones Patricio, Martina and Micaela and the tiny ones Nacho, Catalina and Luna) are added to the group. Patricio is a problematic and troublesome boy, whose behaviour is a consequence of his traumatic past.

Romina Yan and the young cast of Chiquititas, in Season Four.

He does not get along with the other orphans and becomes a challenge to Belén. Martina is an attractive but ambitious girl, who causes jealousy in Georgi. Mosca and Delfina's relationship is intensified, and Belén meets Alejo's supposed identical twin brother, Manuel. Unlike his brother, Manuel is an adorable, sweet-hearted saxophonist, who gives help to Belén and the orphans whenever they need (even softening Patricio's behaviour). However, his presence does not eases Sol's longing for her father.

Like Mili, Jimena is reunited with her mother after discovering that Mosca is her brother only by her father's side. A tragedy reaches the life of the chiquitita, when her mother is shot to death during and expedition in the jungle. Lost in the forest, she used her memories and clues from the other kids to survive (such as creating a sundial), and well as Belén's messages about keeping faith and hope. She makes friends with a monkey and meets Yago, a jungle boy who knows everything about wild life and lost her father. When Jime is rescued by Manuel and Mosca, she takes Yago with her to the manor. The boy takes some time to adjust himself into the civilized life. Elena returns, now rich after inheriting Vega's fortune, decided to take revenge on Belén and the orphans, after taking off Lucia from her.

Georgi is reunited with her older sister and her family, and emotionally leaves the group and the manor. After they start a relationship, Manuel asks Belén in marriage, which she accepts. At the wedding ceremony, Belén tells the orphans that she and Manuel are planning to adopt them all. However, at the same night she discovers the truth about him, through an unknown woman, that being that Manuel and Alejo are in effect, the very same person. Heartbroken with such a lie, she runs away from him. As he follows her, Alejo is hit by a car and ends up seriously damaged. Even after everything they have been through, Belén takes care of Alejo, as a new admin is introduced to the manor. Belén has lost her position after her decision of adopting the orphans, and the Court replaces her by Martirio. Initially adorable with the kids, Martirio reveals her true face as the manor's ultimate hag. Applying severe punishments and methods on them, she plans to stay with their permanent custody. Belén and Alejo fight on court against Martirio, using video messages sent by Georgi and Nico, who are grateful for everything Belén did for them. Belén also exposes to the judge the horrible conditions of a previous institution Martirio took over. She is sent in jail as Belén and Alejo win the orphans's custody, adopting them all. Belén gives her children the Book of Life, in which she writes about the future of each of them.

=== Season Five – Chiquititas 1999 – A new beginning ===
In a reboot of the first series, Maria is a little girl who lives in the streets with some other kids. Somehow, she received the Book of Life written by Belén, and from her messages Maria believes that she and her friends will find a place to live altogether, just like the Rincón de Luz manor. The group meet some other homeless kids and discover a huge granary in their way. The place is inhabited by an enormous tree and a nice but lonely old man, named Joaquín. He welcomes the group in his place as the kids ease her loneliness. The barn is located nearby a mansion which belongs to Joaquín's son Juan Maza, where he lives with his seven children (Mariano, Ines, Javier, the twins Luisana and Titán, Juanita and Agustín). The loss of their mother shattered Juan's relationship with them. The family receives a distant teenager cousin, Candela, whose differences cause issues between her, Mariano and Ines. Candela brings her little brothers Hosana and Facundo with her.

The granary orphans in the fifth season, where the storyline was rebooted. Camila Bordonaba, Benjamin Rojas, Nadia Di Cello, Sebastián Francini and Santiago Stieben, remained in the cast, portraying new roles.

Juan is engaged to an ambitious woman, Pía Pacheco, who has just arrived with her little daughter Tali and personal assistance Elza. Despite Juan is not sure about his feelings for Pía, their wedding ceremony is materialized, but it is interrupted with the arrival of Ana, a sweet-hearted woman, who falls with her balloon right on their wedding cake. Juan falls in love instantly for Ana, and she is well received by Joaquín and the orphans, settling in their granary. Ana talks to Anita, an angel in the form of a young girl only her is able to see. She also notices that Juan's children are living in sadness or emotional need, and starts touching and changing their lives (starting from Javier). Ana's presence also changes the situation between children and father, as Pía becomes increasingly annoyed with her presence. The barn becomes a legal orphanage and receives new children.

The orphans start interacting with the Maza children and with Candela, who develops a troubled relationship with Mariano. She actually is unsure between him and Matías, a handsome neighbor boy. The attention and love Candela receives from everyone cause intense jealousy in Ines. Despite Pía's attempts to separate them, Ana and Juan become lovers, and she decides to ruin their family starting with the orphans. She sends Bautista and Santiago to the Hogar de las Sombras, a horrible child prison, soon before Ana and Juan's wedding. The couple tries to avoid her decision, but since Pía legally assumed the orphanage, Ana authorizes believing the boys are going to a travel. Ana and Juan get married and Candela chooses Mariano over Matías. The orphans emotionally say goodbye to Ana, and Candela is left on their care. However, Pía hires thugs to get rid from the children (the orphans and the Maza kids). Mariano loses contact with his father and he and Candela attempt to escape with the kids from her men, until the group is caught. Candela realizes Pía is mentally ill and Mariano discovers she legally assumed the children. Their last attempt is to fly in Ana's balloon, but only Mariano and Candela are able to flee. As the couple lift off, they are told by Camila to be happy together. The group is then taken to the Hogar de Las Sombras, where they are reunited with Santiago and Bautista. In the horrible place, they have to deal with its rigorous janitors and violent interns, until Maria mitigates them using the messages written in the Book of Life. The group decides to escape from the child prison, struggling against its guards. While they escape, Pía insanely burns the granary, dying in the fire. As the kids flee from their prison, Maria has a vision of Ana and Juan in the skies, and realises that is the right moment to find the Rincón de Luz manor, their last chance to have a family again.

=== Season Six – Chiquititas 2000 - Journey back to the manor ===
Ana and Juan died in a plane crash, Pía burned down the granary and the children escaped from the Hogar de las Sombras. The group formed by Felipe-nicknamed "Mexicano" or "The Mexican" by the others-(Felipe Colombo, who played Felipe is, in fact, Mexican-Argentine), Tali, the Maza children (Luisana, Titán, Juanita and Agustín) and the granary orphans (Camila, Bautista and Maria) was left in sadness, all of them homeless and hopeless. Juanita ended up traumatized and became unable to communicate. Fearing being sent back to the horrendous child prison, the chiquititas need to find a new place to live. María decides it is the perfect time to find the original Rincón de Luz described in her Book of Life, which she faithfully keeps. Following a magic shooting star, the group is led to the house on the corner. The manor seems to be abandoned and scary, as they find the place completely covered in branches and leaves. However, the sinister facade actually covers an utopic place full of toys, puppets and dolls. Camila insists the group is invading a private property (which in fact they are doing), but the Magic Window in the attic reveals that they actually found the Rincón de Luz manor. The orphans glare as a spiritual Belén appears, welcoming them home and stating that, even after all the sorrow the children have been through, they shall not stop dreaming and keeping their faith.

The Chiquititas 2000 (Season Six) main cast. This season was aired in Brazil seven years later as a single story, by SBT.

The kids then discover that the place was sold to a Phantom of the Opera-like mysterious figure named Refael Sander. He was involved in an accident in which he lost a son and got half of his face burned. Since then he has lived in bitterness in the dark, hidden places of the Manor with half of the face covered with a mask, as the place became known as a haunted house. His only company is Enzo the Valet, a bald, funny man who initially lurks and scares the newly arrived children. Camila insists to him that, since they are orphans in an orphanage, they will not leave the manor. As time goes by, Sander allows the children to live in his house, as he discovers that there is a possibility of one of them to be his lost son. Juanita is the first one among them to meet him, and they become good friends. Paula, Sander's deceased wife twin sister, arrives with a girl named Olivia. Paula believes the manor belongs to her and still is in love with Sander, and Olivia is a troublesome compulsive liar. She is ordered by Paula to get as closer to the orphans as possible. She then intervenes in both Camila and Felipe, and Luisana and Bautista relationships.

A young and brave woman named Luz arrives in the manor, after she runs away from her abusive and very violent boss and Maria immediately recognizes her as their "mother", because of Camila's jealousy. Sander secretly watches Luz and falls in love for her. As she discovers the story behind the manor, Luz is decided to bring him to life again. The younger girls discover a library in which fairytales come to life; the manor also hides a magical world inhabited by elves, where Maria befriends a tiny elf named Tok.

=== Season Seven – Chiquititas 2001 ===
As Luz, Sander and Juanita go in search for his lost son, who is supposedly still alive, the orphans are left under the cares of Enzo. However, the Juvenile Court hires a vicious woman named Lidia to be in charge of the house's administration. After Lidia starts ruling their home, the children are once again deprived from their dreams and good life. Camila and Luisana are worried since Felipe and Bautista have not sent news since their travel, some time before Luz and Rafael's wedding. They were actually kidnapped by Paula's henchmen, and had to cause a car crash to escape from them. Felipe falls unconscious and Bautista loses his memories. They are rescued by Miki, an adorable girl who lives in a trailer. As Felipe awakens, he notices that Bautista has amnesia and tells him they should go back home. Even without remembering anything, Bautista goes with him and they take Miki with them, away from her abusive mother.

After her mother dies, a young girl moves to the neighborhood, and starts working at a nearby bar. She is Mili, the original chiquitita and the reason the original orphanage was created. Mili comes back following her memories of her life in the manor, alongside her friends Jime, Georgi, Guille, Mosca and everybody else, and foremost, following Belén's lessons. She is decided to help the orphans ruled by Lidia (who had blocked up the Magic Window), giving back their dreams and their happiness. To deceive Lidia, she joins the manor as a "rigorous" janitor named Greta. Mili receives help in her mission from Enzo and his brother Renzo, and from the handsome bar owner Ramiro. She reveals herself to the kids, but they do not believe in her words with the exception of Maria. Aspiring their house, Lidia tries to send the kids back to the Hogar de las Sombras and ties up Ramiro and Mili to chairs after she discovers her true intentions. Ramiro manages to escape, releasing Mili. As the kids struggle against the guards, Bautista recovers his memories while saving Luisana from them, and the group runs back to the manor. Mili, Ramiro and the orphans are reunited, but Lidia performs her final act even though she is arrested. Stating that if the house will not belong to her then it will not be anyone else's, Lidia reveals to Ramiro that she has implanted explosives in the manor. He desperately runs towards the place, in order to evacuate it. After everybody apparently leaves the manor, Tali misses Agustín and Mili goes back to rescue him. As they run out, the manor explodes, leaving the kids in desperation. As an insane Lidia delights, Mili tells her that she is wrong, and nothing will knock down their home, if the chiquititas stand together. The group is surprised by a white radiance in the sky, which reveals itself to be Belén. She states that the Rincón de Luz will always exist while each child in the world keep his or her dream, and while love exists, as the manor magically starts rebuilding itself, amazing the orphans. Among them, the orphans that lived with Mili (Jime, Corcho, Georgi, Mosca and the others) appear one by one.

Maria passes on the Book of Life to other orphaned children, and as her family formed by her fellows, Mili and Ramiro is shown, she ends the story by telling the audience to never give up their dreams, and if sometime they grow up and think they have lost them, to just look deep inside the heart, where will always be their chiquitita, giving them care.

== Production ==
The series premiered on 7 August 1995, occupying Jugate Conmigo's former time-slot years before. Part of the Jugate cast, including Luciano Castro and Romina Yan herself, is featured in the show's first season. The series started in the traditional dramatic telenovela format, with an adult cast sharing space with the young cast on screen. This aspect changed gradually in the following years (starting with the third season, in 1997), with the young characters receiving more prominence in the storyline. Fantasy elements were also added to the plot. Actress Agustina Cherri had an exclusivity contract with Telefe and was cast as the young protagonist among the orphans, Mili Urién. Romina Yan auditioned for the role of Belén Fraga with few other actresses and was cast.

The series is also known for being the first using the serialized format, unusual in the telenovela genre. Season One has 155 episodes; Seasons Two to Six have the very same number of episodes each year, in a total 210. As a consequence of the series's cancellation, the shortest season is the last one, with only nine episodes. Despite having a sudden ending, the seventh season features the return of Agustina Cherri as 20-year-old Mili.

Romina Yan left the series in 1998 (Season Four), and the storyline was rebooted in the following year, Chiquititas 1999 (Season Five), with new characters, a new story and setting, co-starring Grecia Colmenares and Marcela Kloosterboer. Although having different roles, some young actors from previous seasons remained (such as Guillermo Santa Cruz and Camila Bordonaba), which initially caused confusion on the audience. In 2000 (Season Six), the setting went back to the Rincón de Luz manor, where the series ended in 2001. Each season received a respective soundtrack with three additional albums, all of them released by Sony Music. The songs are without exception composed by Carlos Nilson and Cris Morena. Actor, singer and musician Felipe Colombo was brought by Cris Morena from the Mexican version of the series, where he portrayed Julio. He was introduced in Season Five, alongside Luisana Lopilato. Camila Bordonaba was introduced in Season Two as Pato and Benjamin Rojas in Season Four. They were all cast in Rebelde Way, an Argentine hit television series also created and produced by Morena, in which they portrayed its protagonists and members of the band Erreway.

=== Stage presentations ===
Annual stage presentations at the Gran Rex theatre, written and directed by Cris Morena complemented the series from the second year onwards, featuring the whole cast of each season. The fourth year holds to this day the record of most tickets ever sold by that theatre. An incident occurred in the Season Five performances (Chiquititas 1999), in which a fire generated by short circuit destroyed part of the scenario, specifically the thematic giant tree. Gran Rex did not return the money to the present and frustrated audience.

Between 1996 and 2000, 1.100.432 of Argentine people watched the Chiquititas presentations.

=== Cancellation ===
Chiquititas was canceled after financial disagreements between Cris Morena and Claudio Villarruel, Telefe's newly employed chairman. In the seventh and final season, the running was changed from daily to weekly, being aired at Sundays, and being replaced by a retrospective of Chiquititas previous seasons, entitled Chiquititas: la historia, which was aired daily on the original time slot (weekdays at 6 PM). Morena moved to Canal 9, for which she created Rincón de Luz, a new series with similar concept. The show had to be renamed since the title of Chiquititas contractually belonged to Telefe.

== Reception ==
Chiquititas was panned by critics that deemed the program to be oversexualized and having a bad quality. The idea of an orphanage being portrayed as a beautiful place full of pretty, well-dressed white children was also heavily panned. The Season Five ending, where the adult characters were removed from the storyline after an accident, and the children are sent to the Hogar de las Sombras child prison from which they escape, was considered by some reviewers as "anything but ingenious" and too "traumatic" for children, and received criticism for the writer's "incoherence and unjustified cruelty".

Despite receiving bad reviews, the series became a hit among the young audience, and spawned 150 licensed products and a monthly magazine, La Revista de Chiquititas. The Season Three released soundtrack, La Música de Chiquititas Vol. 3, sold 2.500 copies, and the Season Four album is the top selling among the twelve volumes. Themes such as "Mentiritas", "Corazón con Agujeritos" and "Pimpollo" are the most remembered songs to this day.

== Rincón de Luz ==
Rincón de Luz is a 2003 series created by Cris Morena for Argentine channel Canal 9. This show has the same concept and some of the actors of her previous telenovela Chiquititas, which she could not keep the original title for legal rights. Starring the popular singer Soledad Pastorutti and Guido Kaczka (who had acted in Chiquititas first four seasons as Piojo, Belén's brother), the show did not reach the amount of popularity the first version of the program achieved. However, it was extremely successful in Israel and the complete cast of the show visited Tel Aviv for a series of concerts at Nokia Arena.

In 2001, when leaving Telefe, Cris Morena made it clear that, despite legal rights, she would not stop producing Chiquititas, stating that it was "more than a title". Morena was actually moving the show's concept to another channel with a different title because the program rights were owned by Telefé, not her.

== Cast ==
=== Season One – Chiquititas 1995 ===
- Romina Yan as Belén Fraga
- Agustina Cherri as Milagros Urién
- Fernán Mirás as Facundo Brausen
- Alberto Fernández de Rosa as Saverio Fernández
- Hilda Bernard as Carmen Morán (Main Antagonist)
- Guido Kaczka as Felipe "Piojo" Fraga
- Daniella Mastricchio as Sol Rivera
- María Jimena Piccolo as Jimena Gómez del Solar
- Ezequiel Castaño as Cristián "Mosca" Gómez
- Jorge Rivera López as Ramiro Morán
- Luciano Castro as Luciano "Tano" Ponce
- Solange Verina as Verónica Cisneros
- Marianela Pedano as Mariela Cisneros
- Cinthia Manchado as Cinthia Álvarez / Cinthia Clementi
- Gabriel Corrado as Martín Morán
- Viviana Puerta as Gabriela Morán
- Mabel Landó as Valentina Pereira
- Noelia Castaño as Lorena Sánchez
- Gladys Florimonte as Ernestina Correa
- Susana Ortiz as Matilde Carrasco (Main Antagonist)
- Natalia Lobo as Gynette Monier (Antagonist)
- Hugo Cosiansi as Hernán Ochoa
- Guadalupe Martínez Uría as Dolores Agüero
- Octavio Borro as Tobías Echagüe
- Natalia Lalli as Carolina Hernández
- Abel Sáenz Buhr as Fernando Agüero
- Lucrecia Capello as Emilia Gutiérrez
- Vita Escardó as Leticia Rivera
- Tony Lestingi as Guillermo Cisneros
- Georgina Mollo as Georgina
- Michelle Meeus as Michelle
- Romina Lotoczko as Romina
- María Laura Vicos as Laura "La Colo"
- Trinidad Alcorta as Clara
- Mariano Fernández as Pochi
- Nano Recondo as Facha
- Nilda Raggi as Lala
- Pablo Matar as Julián
- Nicolás Leivas as Matías
- Juan Pablo Martínez as Pablo

=== Season Two – Chiquititas 1996 ===
- Romina Yan as Belén Fraga
- Agustina Cherri as Milagros Urién
- Fernán Mirás as Facundo Brausen
- Alberto Fernández de Rosa as Saverio Fernández
- Hilda Bernard as Carmen Morán (Main Antagonist)
- Guido Kaczka as Felipe "Piojo" Fraga
- Daniella Mastricchio as Sol Rivera
- María Jimena Piccolo as Jimena Gómez del Solar
- Ezequiel Castaño as Cristián "Mosca" Gómez
- Diego Mesaglio as Guadalberto "Corcho" Tapón
- Guillermo Santa Cruz as Guillermo Estevez
- Nadia Di Cello as Nadia Cáceres
- Camila Bordonaba as Patricia "Pato" Basualdo
- Simón Pestana as Andrés Costa
- Michel Brown as Tomás Linares Pintos
- Solange Verina as Verónica Cisneros
- Marianela Pedano as Mariela Cisneros
- Cinthia Manchado as Cinthia Álvarez / Cinthia Clementi
- Santiago Stieben as Luis Facundo Andrés "Roña" González
- Viviana Puerta as Gabriela Morán
- Susana Ortiz as Matilde Carrasco (Main Antagonist)
- Tony Lestingi as Guillermo Cisneros
- Jorge Martínez as Jorge Clementi
- Bárbara Estrabou as Carolina Berti (Antagonist)
- Georgina Mollo as Georgina
- Manuela Pal as Florencia
- Sergio Denis as Sergio
- Michelle Meeus as Michelle
- Romina Lotoczko as Romina
- Giuliana Darioli as Tamara
- Mauricio García as Santiago
- Brenda Díaz as Pilar
- Daniel Rodrigo Martins as Javier
- Jonathan Rendón as Leo
- María Laura Vicos as Laura "La Colo"
- Trinidad Alcorta as Clara
- Lucrecia Álvarez as Mecha
- Juan Pablo Martínez Itria as Nacho

=== Season Three – Chiquititas 1997 ===
- Romina Yan as Belén Fraga
- Agustina Cherri as Milagros Urién
- Fernán Mirás as Facundo Brausen
- Facundo Arana as Alejo Méndez Ayala / Manuel Méndez Ayala
- Alberto Fernández de Rosa as Saverio Fernández
- Guido Kaczka as Felipe "Piojo" Fraga
- Hilda Bernard as Carmen Morán (Main Antagonist)
- Susana Lanteri as Elena Kruegger (Main Antagonist)
- Daniella Mastricchio as Sol Rivera / Sol Méndez Ayala Fraga
- María Jimena Piccolo as Jimena Gómez del Solar
- Ezequiel Castaño as Cristián "Mosca" Gómez
- Diego Mesaglio as Guadalberto "Corcho" Tapón
- Guillermo Santa Cruz as Guillermo Estevez
- Camila Bordonaba as Patricia "Pato" Basualdo
- Nadia Di Cello as Nadia Cáceres
- Sofía Recondo as Lucía Kruegger
- Celeste Cid as Bárbara Ramírez
- Diego García as Martín "Barracuda" Acosta
- Valeria Díaz as Delfina Araoz
- Michel Brown as Tomás Linares Pintos
- Georgina Mollo as Georgina
- Polyana López as Mora
- Carlos Pedevilla as Francisco "Coco"
- Pablo Echarri as Salvador
- Luis Machín as Dr. Mandel
- Luisana Lopilato as Girl
- Santiago Stieben as Luis Facundo Andrés "Roña" González
- Nicolás Goldschmidt as Nicolás López
- Bárbara Estrabou as Carolina Berti / Carolina Morán (Main Antagonist)
- Alan Pañale as Marcos Araoz
- Viviana Puerta as Gabriela Morán
- Vita Escardó as Leticia Rivera
- Alicia Zanca as Amanda del Solar
- Alfonso Burgos as Matías
- Paul Jeannot as Paul
- Carolina Valverde as Lila
- Leonardo Fernández da Silva as Diego
- Jonathan Rendón as Leo
- Luciano Sposo as Rana
- Claudio da Passano as Raúl
- Adriana Salonia as Andrea
- Mónica Buscaglia as Mimí
- Nicolás D'Agostino as Lalo
- Pochi Ducasse as Paula
- Macarena Comas as Quela
- Iván Mudryj as Max
- Benjamín Berro as Agustín
- María Laura Rivero as Paula
- Divina Gloria as Dorita

=== Season Four – Chiquititas 1998 ===
- Romina Yan as Belén Fraga
- Facundo Arana as Alejo Méndez Ayala/Manuel Méndez Ayala
- Alberto Fernández de Rosa as Saverio Fernández
- Guido Kaczka as Felipe "Piojo" Fraga
- Thelma Biral as Mercedes Quintana
- Mónica Villa as Martirio Torres
- Daniella Mastricchio as Sol Rivera/Sol Méndez Ayala Fraga
- María Jimena Piccolo as Jimena Gómez del Solar
- Ezequiel Castaño as Cristián "Mosca" Gómez
- Diego Mesaglio as Guadalberto "Corcho" Tapón
- Camila Bordonaba as Patricia "Pato" Basualdo
- Guillermo Santa Cruz as Guillermo Estevez
- Patricio Schiavone as Patricio Basualdo
- Nadia Di Cello as Nadia Cáceres
- Sofía Recondo as Lucía Kruegger
- Celeste Cid as Bárbara Ramírez
- María Fernanda Neil as Martina Cuenca
- Sebastián Francini as Ignacio "Nacho" Díaz
- Diego García as Martín "Barracuda" Acosta
- Valeria Díaz as Delfina Araoz
- Benjamín Rojas as Yago
- Catalina Artusi as Catalina
- Andrea del Boca as Paula
- Lola Ponce as Serena
- Graciela Stefani as Gloria (Antagonist)
- Ricardo Darín as Nicolas's dad
- Darío Lopilato
- Santiago Stieben as Luis Facundo Andrés "Roña" González
- Nicolás Goldschmidt as Nicolás López
- Alan Pañale as Marcos Araoz
- Susana Lanteri as Elena Kruegger
- Alicia Zanca as Amanda del Solar
- Ernesto Claudio as Guillermo "Don Yiyo" Estevez
- Georgina Mollo as Georgina
- Nadine Dwek as Micaela
- Aldana Jussich as Luna
- Alfonso Burgos as Matías
- Mariano Villa as Álvaro
- Claudio da Passano as Raúl
- Federico Cernadas as Guido
- Horacio Ranieri as Aníbal
- Pablo Ricciardulli as Santiago
- Juan Cruz Soares Gache as Juan Cruz
- Matías Baglivo as Juan Martín
- Alejandro Alzieu as Juan Pablo
- Brian Ruiz as Juan Carlos
- Manuela Sánchez Marino as Soe
- Moro Anghileri as Nora
- Luana Pascual as Marité
- Mariano Farrán as Mariano
- Claudio Rissi as Dr. Maciel

=== Season Five – Chiquititas 1999 ===
- Grecia Colmenares as Ana Pizarro
- Darío Grandinetti as Juan Maza
- Ricardo Lavié as Joaquín Maza
- Gustavo Guillen as Mauro Echagüe
- Marcela Kloosterboer as Candela Maza
- Camila Bordonaba as Camila Bustillo
- Benjamín Rojas as Bautista Arce
- Nadia Di Cello as María Fernández
- Sebastián Francini as Sebastián Mansilla
- Felipe Colombo as Felipe Mejía
- Guillermo Santa Cruz as Javier Maza
- Luisana Lopilato as Luisana Maza
- Agustín Sierra as Agustín Maza
- Milagros Flores as Juana Maza
- Natalia Melcon as Natalia Ramos Pacheco Acevedo
- Sofía Recondo as Ana "Anita" Pizarro
- María Fernanda Neil as Fernanda
- Silvina Bosco as Estela
- Ana María Giunta as Raquel
- Mónica Villa as Orphanage Director "Las Sombras"
- Lidia Catalano as Elsa Martú
- Millie Stegman as Pía Pacheco Acevedo
- Mariano Bertolini as Mariano Maza
- Agustina Dantiacq as Inés Maza
- Cristian Belgrano as Cristián "Titán" Maza
- Facundo Caccia as Facundo Maza
- Hosana Ricón as Hosana Maza
- Matías Apostolo as Matías Gallardo
- Miguel Habud as Guillermo Ramos
- Federico Barón as Federico "Once" Martínez
- Natalie Pérez as Victoria "Vicky" Bustamante
- Osvaldo Sabatini as Pablo "Polito" Pacheco Acevedo
- Santiago Stieben as Santiago
- Hernán Cajaraville as Hernán
- Diego Lazzarin as Diego
- David Bianco as David
- Bárbara Campanella as Victoria "Toia"
- Lucas Crespi as Lucas
- Florencia Risso as Florencia
- Pablo Ricciardulli as Pedro
- Natalia Lalli as Delfina
- Mónica Calho as Mechita
- Amalia Etchesuri as Soledad
- Federico Salles as Paco
- Débora Cuenca as Abril "Doce"

=== Season Six – Chiquititas 2000 ===
- Romina Gaetani as Luz Linares
- Patricia Sosa as Paula Casani / Alejandra Casani
- Gustavo Guillen as Francisco López
- Camila Bordonaba as Camila Bustillo
- Benjamín Rojas as Bautista Arce
- Nadia Di Cello as María Fernández
- Sebastián Francini as Sebastián Mansilla
- Felipe Colombo as Felipe Mejía
- Luisana Lopilato as Luisana Maza
- Agustín Sierra as Agustín Maza
- Milagros Flores as Juana Maza
- Natalia Melcon as Natalia Ramos Pacheco Acevedo
- Darío Lopilato as Ignacio Montero
- Mariana Seligmann as Pilar
- Diego García as Matías
- Belén Scalella as Campanita
- Cristian Belgrano as Cristián "Titán" Maza
- Federico Barón as Federico "Once" Martínez
- Iván Espeche as Rafael Sander / Andrés Ferala
- Pablo Lizaso as Enzo Miranda
- Pablo Oliva as Pablo Rojas
- Candela Gribodo as Olivia Casani
- Axel Marazzi as Gonzalo Bustamante
- Nahuel Picone as Nahuel Bustamante
- Philippe Caillon as Tomás Rojas
- Bernardita Flores as Bernarda "Bernardita" Herrera
- Nicolás Feal as Gastón "Moco" Machado
- Victoria Mena as Daniela
- Eliana González as Zoe
- Nicolás Goldschmidt as Nacho
- Xoana Winter as Patsy
- Daniela Nirenberg as Milagros
- Darío Torrens as Alejo
- César Bordón as Amadeus
- Leonardo Centeno as Lagarto
- Claudio Tolcachir as Peter Pan
- Brian Vainberg as Tok
- Facundo Caccia as Tuz
- Ian Soto as Tak
- Federico Cassani as Tek
- Julián Baglieto as Tik

=== Season Seven – Chiquititas 2001 ===
- Agustina Cherri as Milagros Urién
- Camila Bordonaba as Camila Bustillo
- Benjamín Rojas as Bautista Arce
- Nadia Di Cello as María Fernández
- Sebastián Francini as Sebastián Mansilla
- Felipe Colombo as Felipe Mejía
- Luisana Lopilato as Luisana Maza
- Agustín Sierra as Agustín Maza
- Natalia Melcon as Natalia Ramos Pacheco Acevedo
- Romina Yan as Belén Fraga
- Daniella Mastricchio as Sol Rivera / Sol Méndez Ayala Fraga
- María Jimena Piccolo as Jimena Gómez del Solar
- Ezequiel Castaño as Cristián "Mosca" Gómez
- Diego Mesaglio as Guadalberto "Corcho" Tapón
- Guillermo Santa Cruz as Guillermo Estevez
- Sofía Recondo as Lucía Kruegger
- Diego García as Martín
- Jorge Maggio as Francisco
- Micaela Vázquez as Micaela
- Cristian Belgrano as Cristián "Titán" Maza
- Federico Barón as Federico Martínez
- Pablo Lizaso as Enzo Miranda
- Gastón Ricaud as Ramiro Linares
- Lucas Ferraro as Michel Monteagudo
- María Roji as Lidia Monteagudo
- Omar Calicchio as Renzo Miranda
- Santiago Stieben as Luis Facundo Andrés "Roña" González
- Nicolás Goldschmidt as Nicolás López
- Viviana Puerta as Gabriela Morán
- Aldana Troncoso as Julieta
- Michelle Wiernik as Michelle
- Patricio Benavides as Patricio
- Georgina Mollo as Georgina
- Luciana Ojeda as Marina
- Geraldine Belén Visciglio as Floppy

=== Season Eight – Chiquititas 2006 ===
- Alejo García Pintos as Pierre Demont
- María Carámbula as Julia Anzorena de Demont
- Laura Oliva as María Antoniette Demont
- Mariana Briski as Teresa Gómez
- Gonzalo Heredia as Mateo Von Bauer
- Gloria Carrá as Betiana Dalecio / Beatriz Pérez
- Mariana Espósito as Agustina Ross
- Candela Vetrano as Valeria San Simón
- Eva De Dominici as Micaela Cortés
- Gastón Soffritti as Federico "Pulgas" Romero
- Stéfano de Gregorio as Juan Manuel "Petardo" Flores
- Juan Pedro Lanzani as Nicolás "Tábano" Ramírez
- Agustín Sierra as Franco
- Brenda Gandini as Constanza
- Nicolás Riera as Model
- Jorgelina Aruzzi as Magalí Garcés / Lilí Garcés
- Gastón Ricaud as Lucas "Kili" Rodríguez
- Ricardo Aiello as Manuel "Nano" Sierra
- Facundo Aguilar as Damián "Julepe" Lerner
- Guido Pennelli as Fernando "Fercho" Bulasini
- Nicole Popper as Paula Ramírez
- Guadalupe Antón as Ana de los Santos
- Camila Castro as Luna Cairoli
- Delfina Varni as Thiara Demont Anzorena
- Luciano Ruiz as Marcel Demont Anzorena
- Ernesto Claudio as Víctor Garcés
- Alejo Ortiz as Diego Rodríguez
- Carolina Pampillo as Bárbara Fernández Alcorta de Garcés
- Mariana Richaudeau as Lucía
- Geraldine Belén Visciglio as Geraldine
- Rocío Aguirre as Rocío
- Dolores Sarmiento as Melissa
- José Zito as Felipe
- Irene Almus as Úrsula
- Nazareno Antón as Santiago
- Verónica Pelaccini as Mercedes
- Víctor Moyano as Willy
- Susana Ortiz as Nora
- Lucrecia Blanco as Marina

== Music ==
The original show includes twelve soundtracks, which were recorded by the actors of Chiquititas.

== See also ==
- Madeline, series of novels with similar concept.
- A Little Princess, similarly themed novel.
- August Rush, 2007 film with a similar storyline.
- Que Angelitos, a 1980s Puerto Rican children's television comedy.
- AnnieThe 1982 film tells the story of an orphan who dreams of a new life away from the orphanage.
