= Civil ceremony =

Non-religious legal marriage ceremony

A civil ceremony, or registrar ceremony, is a non-religious legal marriage ceremony performed by a government official or functionary. In the United Kingdom, this person is typically called a registrar. In the United States, civil ceremonies may be performed by town, city, or county clerks, judges or justices of the peace, or others possessing the legal authority to support the marriage as the wedding officiant.

The Signing of the marriage registers with witnesses present, at Sprowston Manor, UK.

In the UK, a civil registrar ceremony cannot include hymns, religious readings or prayers, and the marriage must take place at a registered or licensed venue to be legally valid. Many private premises are licensed to hold civil ceremony. As well as each party to the marriage signing the register, signatures of two witnesses are also required.

In most American jurisdictions, civil registrar ceremonies are subject to the same requirements as religious ceremonies, including venue reservation fees, marriage license fees, and age restrictions. The ceremony may take place in many places, including courthouses, parks, gardens, banquet halls, hotels, and other approved venues. Many venues may also accommodate the reception. Like non-civil ceremonies, the formality and style of the ceremony depend entirely on the tastes of the couple.

== Scotland: civil registrar ceremonies and civil ceremonies ==
Civil Registration of all Births, Deaths & Marriages has been compulsory in Scotland since 1855 when the UK government passed several Acts & Bills, effectively to stop the Scottish Traditional Practice of Legal Weddings being performed by communities.

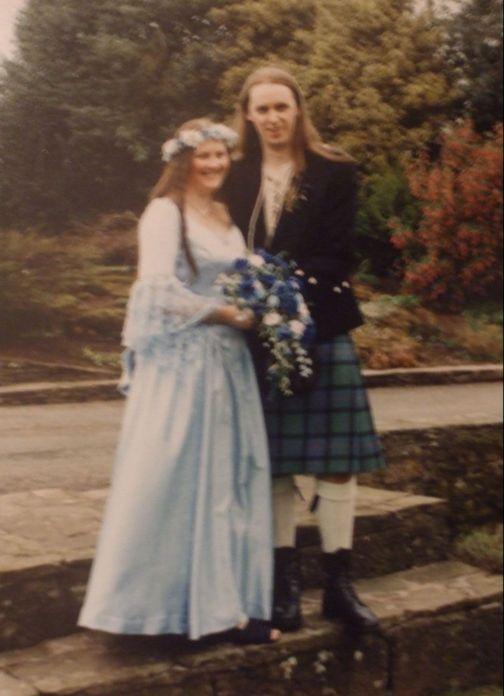
A Celtic Handfast or Wedding Blessing (performed by a Civil Celebrant) with witnesses present, at Glamis, Scotland.

In 1847, The Scotsman said that "Everybody knows that, by the law of Scotland, the marriage ceremony can be performed with as perfect legal effect by a blacksmith as by a clergyman." The government wanted to end the Scottish practice of regarding a couple as married if they stated as much in front of witnesses. Scottish Registration Bills were accompanied by Bills to reform the law of marriage. This was opposed by the Church of Scotland, concerned that the new civil weddings would discourage people from getting married in a church.

In the end, the government dropped the marriage proposals, the session clerks were paid to be registrars, and the Treasury met the cost of the new system. That allowed the bill to be passed by Parliament and approved by Queen Victoria on August 7, 1854. The new system of civil registration started on January 1, 1855.

Effectively, since 1855, Civil Marriage Ceremonies have not been legal in Scotland, except if performed by an employee of the government, usually in a registrars office. These Civil Registrar Ceremonies are completely non-religious and are not the same as Civil Ceremonies.

You can get married or form a civil partnership in the UK if you are:

- 16 or over
- free to marry or form a civil partnership (single, divorced or widowed)
- not closely related
- You need permission from your parents or guardians if you're under 18 in England, Wales and Northern Ireland.

Only same-sex couples can form a civil partnership in Scotland. Same-sex and opposite-sex couples can form a civil partnership in England, Wales, and Northern Ireland.

Same-sex couples can:

- form a civil partnership in England, Scotland, Wales, and Northern Ireland
- get married in England, Scotland, Wales, and Northern Ireland
- convert your civil partnership into a marriage in England, Scotland, Wales, and Northern Ireland

== Australia ==
Civil ceremonies were legalised in Australia in 1973.

To be legally married in Australia, a person must:

- not be married to someone else
- not be marrying a parent, grandparent, child, grandchild, brother or sister
- be at least 18 years old, unless a court has approved a marriage where one party is aged between 16 and 18 years old
- understand what marriage means and freely consent to marry
- use specific words during the ceremony
- give written notice of their intention to marry to their authorised celebrant, within the required time frame.

== Hong Kong ==
In Hong Kong, the Marriage (Introduction of Civil Celebrants of Marriages and General Amendments) Ordinance ("the Marriage Amendment Ordinance") came into force on 13 March 2006. It empowered the Registrar of Marriages to appoint civil celebrants of marriages and, to enable a marriage to be celebrated before a civil celebrant at any time and place, other than the office of the Registrar of Marriages or a deputy registrar of marriages (a "marriage registry") or a place of worship licensed under the Ordinance.
