= Chiquititas: rincón de luz =

2001 film by José Luis Massa

- Directed by: José Luis Massa
- Written by: Alex Ferrara; Walter Ferrara
- Based on: Chiquititas
- Produced by: Cris Morena; Carlos Mentasti; Juan Lovece
- Starring: Romina Yan; Facundo Arana
- Cinematography: Ricardo Rodríguez
- Music by: Cris Morena; Carlos Nilson
- Distributed by: Líder Films S.A.
- Release date: 12 July 2001 (Argentina)
- Running time: 100 minutes
- Country: Argentina
- Language: Spanish
- Budget: $3.250.000 million

Chiquititas: rincón de luz is a 2001 Argentine fantasy-adventure film directed by José Luis Massa and written by Alex Ferrara and Walter Ferrara. Based on the television series of same name which began on Argentine television in 1995. The film was released in Argentina on 12 July 2001, and is produced by Cris Morena, creator of Chiquititas original television series. Starring Romina Yan, Facundo Arana, Camila Bordonaba, Felipe Colombo, Benjamín Rojas, Luisana Lopilato, Nadia Di Cello, Milagros Flores, Agustín Sierra, Natalia Melcon, Sebastián Francini, Federico Barón and Brian Vainberg. The antagonists were Juan Leyrado and Alejandra Flechner.

== Plot ==
The story follows the life of some orphans who are forced to work on a farm ran by Colonel Francisco Estévez (Juan Leyrado) and Marga Calvo (Alejandra Flechner). One of the orphans, Belén Fraga (Romina Yan) comes across a book that Tok (Brian Vainberg) and the Old Wise Man recommended to her. Belén also meets Alejo Méndez Ayala (Facundo Arana) who lives with a boy named Felipe Mejía (Felipe Colombo). The colonel was interested in a cave that contained very valuable diamonds. By the end, it turns out that the diamonds belonged to Belén. It is a story full of magic and songs.

== Cast ==
=== Protagonists ===
- Romina Yan as Belén Fraga
- Facundo Arana as Alejo Méndez Ayala

=== Main cast ===
- Camila Bordonaba as Camila Bustillo
- Benjamín Rojas as Bautista Arce
- Luisana Lopilato as Luisana Maza
- Felipe Colombo as Felipe Mejía
- Sebastián Francini as Sebastián Mansilla
- Nadia Di Cello as María Fernández
- Milagros Flores as Juana Maza
- Agustín Sierra as Agustín Maza
- Natalia Melcon as Natalia Ramos Pacheco Acevedo
- Federico Barón as Federico Martínez
- Cristian Belgrano as Cristián Maza
- Brian Vainberg as Tok

=== Antagonists ===
- Juan Leyrado as Coronel Francisco Estévez
- Alejandra Flechner as Marga Calvo

=== Participations ===
- Roberto Carnaghi as Mayor
- Franklin Caicedo as Old Wise Man
- Gilda Gentile as Gypsy
- Lelio Lesser as Man in town
- Alejandra Perlusky as Fish Saleswoman
- Gustavo Pastorini as Conejero
- Carlos Kaspar as Huevero

== Production ==
The first plans of a Chiquititas film began four years before the start of this production. The project was supposed to be made for the Brazilian audience but ideas later dropped out.

The movie was shot in 2000 in Villa La Angostura.

== Music ==
Chiquititas: rincón de luz features, in addition to the television show's cast, the songs that became a hit with the Chiquititas Argentine young audience, such as "Pimpollo", "Había una vez", "Penitas", and the main title song that featured in Chiquititas show's third season, "Rinconcito de luz".

The actress Camila Bordonaba and the actor Felipe Colombo sang the song "Pimpollo" in Hebrew for the Israel play Katantanot based on the film Chiquititas: rincón de luz

== Reception ==
The Chiquititas feature film was not screened for critics, as it was basically a result of the huge success among children from Argentina and other countries, like Israel. However, it received mixed to negative reviews. Reviewers stated that rincón de luz presented typical elements from famous American musical/fantasy films (which Cris Morena herself enjoys) such as The Sound of Music and The NeverEnding Story. The film received a positive review from Argentine newspaper La Nación.

The film was a huge success at the Israeli box office, and was adapted into a musical production in the country. Actors Sebastián Francini and Nadia Di Cello were featured in a presentation.
