= Rincón de Luz =

Argentine telenovela

- Genre: Telenovela
- Created by: Cris Morena
- Written by: Cris Morena; Ricardo Morteo; Marcos Villalón
- Directed by: Osvaldo Cappra; Gerardo Mariani; Jorge Oneglia
- Starring: Soledad Pastorutti; Guido Kaczka
- Theme music composer: Cris Morena
- Opening theme: Rinconcito de luz and Cha pa cha
- Country of origin: Argentina
- Original language: Spanish
- No. of seasons: 1
- No. of episodes: 199

Production
- Executive producer: Gabriela Espiño
- Producers: Cris Morena; Yair Dori; Vanina Iglesias; Natalí Knobel; Nora Valle; Misha
- Production location: Buenos Aires
- Running time: 40 minutes

Original release
- Network: Canal 9 América
- Release: February 10 – December 18, 2003

Related
- Rebelde Way; Floricienta; Chiquititas; Casi Ángeles

Rincón de Luz ("Corner of Light") is a 2003 Argentine children's telenovela aired on Canal 9 produced by Cris Morena. It is a spin-off and spiritual successor of the children's telenovela Chiquititas.

The series stars Soledad Pastorutti and Guido Kaczka, with Melina Petriella, Alejandra Darín and Juan Ponce de León playing antagonists. Other cast members included Esteban Pérez, Salo Pasik and Susana Lanteri.

== Story ==
It all starts at Christmas, when Álvaro del Solar returns from Europe to receive his share of the family inheritance that his grandmother, Victoria del Solar, decided to share in life among all his grandchildren. It turns out that Mrs. Victoria does not want to give her part to Álvaro since she is trying to laziness and sees him as a good for nothing. On his way, Álvaro meets some kids named Tali, Julián, Carola, Lucas, Malena and Mateo and has the idea of creating an orphanage to be able to collect the inheritance as soon as possible with the help of his friends, Tobías, Javier and Delfina, who brings little Josefina to live with them. Soon the beautiful and sweet Soledad appears, who loves children very much unlike the bad director María Julia del Solar, and disguises herself as Mencha the guardian to approach the Solar family and get information about what happened with her ex-boyfriend Santiago, who suffers in a hospital bed due to an accident in the factory of this family and brings with him baby Ezequiel who joins the boys of the home and then discovers Laura, a "ghost girl". Then other boys come to the home like Josefina, Amir, Guillermo, Pía, Lucía, Úrsula and Estrella to live many adventures, secrets, pains, mysteries and loves, they begin, while Soledad begins to feel something for Álvaro and he also for her.

== Cast ==
- Soledad Pastorutti as Soledad Acosta
- Guido Kaczka as Álvaro del Solar
- Melina Petriella as Delfina Díaz Guillén
- Nadia Di Cello as Nadia Fernández
- Agustín Sierra as Lucas Lagos
- Natalia Melcon as Natalia “Tali” Toledo
- Mariana Espósito as Malena Cabrera
- Stéfano de Gregorio as Mateo Salinas
- Milagros Flores as Bárbara Caride
- María Eugenia Suárez as Pía
- Candela Vetrano as Estrella
- Gastón Soffritti as Guillermo
- Florencia Padilla as Carola Villafañe
- Luciano Nóbile as Julián Ferraro
- Delfina Varni as Josefina Marini
- Ezequiel Díaz as Amir Shahsar
- Camila Salazar as Lucía Lagos
- José Zito as Sebastián Caride
- Mía Flores Piran as Luciana Caride
- Susana Lanteri as Victoria del Solar
- Alejandra Darín as María Julia “Majula” del Solar
- Adriana Salonia as Diana del Solar
- Salo Pasik as León Casares
- Sergio Surraco as Javier Jara
- Lucas Crespi as Tobías Franco
- Karina Dali as Floppy de la Canal
- Matthew Wutheron as Matias Rost
- Nicolás Goldschmidt as Rana
- Kevin Sztajn as Ezequiel
- Laura Anders as Laura
- Camila Offerman as Úrsula
- Lucas Feriol as Ramiro
- Daiana de la Canal as Vicky
- Georgina Mollo as Clara
- Dolores Ocampo as Mercedes
- Juan Ponce de León as Juan Ignacio
