= Amor mío (Argentine TV series) =

- Opening theme: "Celosa" by Donald
- Country of origin: Argentina
- Original language: Spanish
- No. of episodes: 160

Production
- Executive producer: Cris Morena
- Producer: Giselle González Salgado
- Camera setup: Multi-camera
- Running time: 30 minutes

Original release
- Network: Telefe
- Release: March 9 – December 6, 2005

Amor Mío ("My Love") is a Spanish language comedy telecomedy, produced in Argentina by Telefe and for Mexico by Televisa. This romantic comedy features Abril Juárez and Marcos Sinclair, two singles who are forced to share an apartment in Buenos Aires even though they cannot stand each other.

Two versions of this show were shot at the Telefe studios in Buenos Aires. The first, which aired in Argentina, starred Romina Yan and Damián de Santo. The second, aimed at a Mexican audience, stars Vanessa Guzmán and Raúl Araiza.

== Cast ==
Actor	Role
Romina Yan	Abril
Damián De Santo	Marcos
María Valenzuela	Maggie
Arturo Bonín	Andres
Jorgelina Aruzzi	Vera
Pasta Dioguardi	Felipe
Gastón Ricaud	Santiago
Eugenia Suárez	Violeta
Ernesto Claudio	Donado
Mariela Castro Balboa	Betty
Chela Carcalda	Sara
Rita Terranova	Inés

== Episodes ==
No.	Title	Mexican air date
1	"Llueve sobre mojado"	August 14, 2006
2	"Segundos afuera"	August 15, 2006
3	"Las apariencias engañan"	August 16, 2006
3	"Las apariencias engañan"	August 16, 2006
4	"Matrimonio por convenencia"	August 17, 2006
5	"Y todo a media luz"	August 18, 2006
6	"Planes pasados por agua"	August 21, 2006
7	"Doble identidad"	August 22, 2006
8	"Todo vuelve"	August 23, 2006
9	"Planes La ventana indiscreta"	August 24, 2006
10	"Cita a Ciegas"	August 25, 2006
11	"Lavado de Cerebro"	August 28, 2006
12	"Ver para Creer"	August 29, 2006
13	"La fiesta In olvidable"	August 30, 2006
14	"Perdiendo el Juicio"	August 31, 2006
15	"Ojos Bien Abiertos"	September 4, 2006
16	"Mi Gran Boda Gringa"	September 5, 2006
17	"No va Más"	September 6, 2006
