= Susana Giménez (talk show) =

- Also known as: Hola Susana (1987–1990); Hola Susana, te estamos llamando (1991–1997)
- Genre: Talk show Variety show
- Written by: Hugo Sofovich (sketches; 1992–2003)
- Presented by: Susana Giménez
- Starring: Antonio Gasalla; Dady Brieva; Miguel del Sel
- Country of origin: Argentina
- Original language: Spanish
- No. of episodes: 3,000

Production
- Producers: Ovidio García; Raúl Nayaz; Luis Cella; Gustavo González; Gustavo Yankelevich; Néstor Moyano; Marisa Badía
- Production locations: Telefe Studios; Martínez, Buenos Aires Province

Original release
- Network: ATC (1987); Canal 9 (1988–1991); Telefe (1992–present)
- Release: April 1, 1987 – present

Susana Giménez, often shortened to SG, is an Argentine television talk show that has run nationally since 1987. Owned and hosted by its namesake, Susana Giménez, it remains one of the highest-rated television shows in Argentine television history. Due to the popularity of the show, Giménez is usually compared to Oprah Winfrey.

The television show is notable in Latin America, and one of the few in Latin America to receive dozens of international stars from Hollywood and Europe.

Inspired by Pronto, Rafaella, hosted by Rafaella Carrá, the show was originally called Hola Susana and then Hola Susana, te estamos llamando (Hello Susana, we are calling you). It has combined interviews, sketch comedy, games and live musical performances. Giménez has received national and international stars in what is known as her "living". In 1998 the show entered Guinness World Records because of all the letters Giménez received in her show, thirty-two million in total. Furthermore, during the first years of the show, telephone lines collapsed.

Susana Giménez is one of the longest-running television talk shows in Argentine history. The show has received twenty-one Martín Fierro Awards, including the Golden Martín Fierro and Platinum Martín Fierro.

== History ==
Hola Susana debuted in Argentina Televisora Color (ATC) on April 1, 1987 at 13:00. Giménez had just finished La mujer del año, a theatrical success which, in her own words, changed her career and made her a prestigious star.

Some time ago Ovidio García, Raffaella Carrá's manager in Argentina and now producer of the cycle, came to me with Jorge Torres. He told me Carrà was killing in Italy with Pronto, Raffaella, a show with a lot of swing, live phone calls and great participation. I feel is time. The challenge, the jump forward. The debt I contracted with the public was to be paid.

In the early years of the show, ratings were very high, with peaks from 30 to 40 points. Between 1988 and 1991, Hola Susana was broadcast on Canal 9. In 1992 it began to air on Telefe and changed its name to Hola Susana, te estamos llamando. After litigation with Ovidio García, former producer of the program, the show changed its name to Susana Giménez in 1998.

Over the years he received dozens of international stars. Some of the guests were Woody Allen, Justin Bieber, Shakira, Rod Stewart, Lenny Kravitz, Michael Bublé, Anthony Quinn, Sophia Loren, Alain Delon, Backstreet Boys, Claudia Schiffer, Naomi Campbell, Fran Drescher, Thalía, Roberto Gómez Bolaños, Viggo Mortensen, Xuxa, Brian May, Ron Wood, Ricky Martin. Christopher Reeve, Duran Duran, Alanis Morissette, Chayanne, Julio Iglesias, Wisin y Yandel, Salma Hayek, Antonio Banderas, Daddy Yankee, Paulina Rubio, Benicio del Toro, Robbie Williams, Luis Miguel, Liza Minnelli and Gloria Estefan and many others.

In the years 2002, 2006, 2012, 2018 and between 2020–2023 Susana Giménez was not broadcast because Giménez needed to rest.

== Awards ==
- 2013 Martín Fierro Awards
  - Best general interest
