= Chiquititas soundtracks =

Chiquititas is an Argentine telenovela, created by Cris Morena. It was very successful in every country where it was broadcast. The cast recorded seven albums as soundtracks, and the songs were written by Cris Morena (credited as Cristina de Giacomi).

== La Música de Chiquititas ==
La Música de Chiquititas

Soundtrack album by Chiquititas cast
- Released: 1995
- Recorded: Various times
- Genres: Pop, Latin
- Length: 28:52
- Label: Sony Music
- Producer: Cris Morena

Chiquititas cast chronology
''La Música de Chiquititas'' (1995)	Chiquititas 1996 (1996)

Track listing

1. "Rechufas"
2. "Había una vez"
3. "Señales"
4. "¿Por qué, Dios?"
5. "Hasta diez"
6. "Mentiritas"
7. "Todo todo"
8. "Igual a los demás"
9. "Blue Jean Baby Tatuá"
10. "Te encontré"

== La Música de Chiquititas - Volumen 2 ==
La Música de Chiquititas - Volumen 2

Soundtrack album by Chiquititas cast
- Released: 1996
- Recorded: Various times
- Genres: Pop, Latin
- Length: 32:16
- Label: EMI
- Producer: Cris Morena

Chiquititas cast chronology
Chiquititas 1995 (1995)	La Música de Chiquititas - Volumen 2 (1996)	Chiquititas 1997 (1997)

Track listing

1. "Al Fin"
2. "Me Pasan Cosas"
3. "Me Hace Llorar"
4. "Corazón con Agujeritos"
5. "El Chef Saverio"
6. "Chufacha"
7. "Malísima"
8. "Crecer"
9. "A Berlín"
10. "Amigas"

== Felices Fiestas Con Chiquititas ==
Felices Fiestas Con Chiquititas

Soundtrack album by Chiquititas cast
- Released: 1997
- Recorded: Various times
- Genres: Pop, Latin
- Length: 9:00
- Label: Sony Music
- Producer: Cris Morena

Chiquititas cast chronology
La Música de Chiquititas (1995)	Felices Fiestas Con Chiquititas (1997)	Chiquititas 1997 (1997)

Track listing

1. "Año Nuevo"
2. "En Él Comienzo"
3. "Navidad"
4. "Ángeles Cocineros"

== La Música de Chiquititas - Volumen 3 ==
La Música de Chiquititas - Volumen 3

Soundtrack album by Chiquititas cast
- Released: 1997
- Recorded: Various times
- Genres: Pop, Latin
- Length: 32:37
- Label: Sony Music
- Producer: Cris Morena

Chiquititas cast chronology
Chiquititas 1996 (1996)	La Música de Chiquititas - Volumen 3 (1997)	Chiuqititas 1998 (1998)

Track listing

1. "Penitas"
2. "La Edad del Pavo"
3. "Por Una Sola Vez"
4. "¿Qué Hiciste Qué?"
5. "Todavía"
6. "Rinconcito de Luz"
7. "Papá"
8. "Enamorada de Todos"
9. "Brujas Feas"
10. "El Beso"
11. "Chufachon"

== Chiquititas Vol. 4 ==
Chiquititas Vol. 4

Soundtrack album by Chiquititas cast
- Released: 1998
- Recorded: Various times
- Genres: Pop, Latin
- Length: 31:18
- Label: Sony Music
- Producer: Cris Morena

Chiquititas cast chronology
Chiquititas 1997 (1997)	Chiquititas Vol. 4 (1998)	Chiuqititas 1999 (1999)

Track listing

1. "Dame una CH"
2. "Estoy Loco"
3. "Chiquititas"
4. "Lu, Lucita"
5. "Celeste y Blanco"
6. "Pimpollo"
7. "Estúpida, Romántica Idiota"
8. "Volar Mejor"
9. "No Puede Ser"
10. "24 Horas"
11. "Juguete Para Armar"

== Chiquititas Vol. 5 ==
Chiquititas Vol. 5

Soundtrack album by Chiquititas cast
- Released: 1999
- Recorded: Various times
- Genres: Pop, Latin
- Length: 29:39
- Label: Sony Music
- Producer: Cris Morena

Chiquititas cast chronology
Chiquititas 1998 (1998)	Chiquititas Vol. 5 (1999)	Chiuqititas 2000 (2000)

Track listing

1. Siempre Chiquititas"
2. "Patito Feo"
3. "Soltate"
4. "Candela"
5. "Álbum de la Vida"
6. "Adolescente"
7. "Ventanita"
8. "Sr. Amor"
9. "Pajarito"
10. "Recordar"

=== Notes ===
A second version of "Todo Todo" was recorded by the cast, and features a new music video, although being only used in presentations on stage. For unknown reasons, Ana and Juan's love theme "Mundos Diferentes" is also absent from the track listing.

== Chiquititas Vol. 6 ==
Chiquititas Vol. 6

Soundtrack album by Chiquititas cast
- Released: 2000
- Recorded: Various times
- Genres: Pop, Latin
- Length: 30:19
- Label: Sony Music
- Producer: Cris Morena

Chiquititas cast chronology
Chiquititas 1999 (1999)	Chiquititas Vol. 6 (2000)	Chiuqititas 2001 (2001)

Track listing

1. "Chiquititas 2000"
2. "Mi Chica"
3. "Tilín Tilín"
4. "Te Miro y Tiemblo"
5. "Rebelde"
6. "Pequeño Amor"
7. "Pan y Queso"
8. "Luz de Estrella"
9. "Compañero"
10. "Abre, Entra"

=== Notes ===
A version of "Pienso En Ti" was Felipe and Camila's love theme in Chiquititas 2000, although it is not part of the album. A new version of "Todo Todo", sung by actress Romina Gaetani was also recorded, but exclusively for stage presentations.

== Chiquititas Vol. 7 ==
Chiquititas Vol. 7

Soundtrack album by Chiquititas cast
- Released: 2001
- Recorded: Various times
- Genres: Pop, Latin
- Length: 30:19
- Label: Sony Music
- Producer: Cris Morena

Chiquititas cast chronology
Chiquititas 2000 (2000)	Chiquititas Vol. 7 (2001)	Chiquititas: Rincón de Luz (2001)

Track listing

1. "Amor Chiquito"
2. "Pacto De Amor"
3. "Esperanza"
4. "Ay Amor"
5. "Ventanita De Los Suenos"
6. "Amigo Mio"
7. "Vuela"
8. "Chiquititas Baila Así"
9. "Todo Bien"
10. "Mi Vida Es Mía"
11. "Chiquititas Baila Así" (instrumental)
12. "Rebelde" (instrumental)

=== Notes ===
Mili's theme "Ventanita De Los Sueños" samples "Había Una Vez" and "Por Una Sola Vez", two earlier themes sung by Agustina Cherri (and her character Mili).

== Chiquititas: Rincón de Luz ==
Chiquititas: Rincón de Luz

Soundtrack album by Chiquititas: Rincón de Luz cast
- Released: 2001
- Recorded: Various times
- Genres: Pop, Latin
- Length: 25:35
- Label: Yair Dori International
- Producer: Cris Morena

Chiquititas: Rincón de Luz cast chronology
Chiquititas 2001 (2001)	Chiquititas: Rincón de Luz (2001)	24 Horas (2006)

Track listing

1. "Rinconcito de luz - abertura chiquititas"
2. "Pimpollo"
3. "Hasta Diez"
4. "Penitas"
5. "Había Una Vez"
6. "Pienso En Ti"
7. "Todo Todo"
8. "Rebelde"
9. "Ángeles cocineros"
10. "Rinconcito de Luz"

=== Notes ===
"Pienso En Ti" ("I Think Of You") was originally composed by Cris Morena for her television show Jugate Conmigo. The theme was sung by actor Michel Brown, a cast member of Jugate, and years later, after being translated and adapted to Brazilian Portuguese, was used in Chiquititas Brasil Season Four, as Fran and Samuca's love theme "Penso Em Ti". In Chiquititas 1999 (Season Five), it became Felipe and Camila's love theme, which they once again sang in the Chiquititas feature film.

The film's score features instrumental versions of some themes originally used in the television series. "Te Encontré" ("I Found You"), Belén and Martín's love theme from Chiquititas Season One, can be heard in the scene where Alejo survives the explosion and Belén swim to his arms.

== 24 Horas ==
24 Horas

Soundtrack album by Chiquititas Sin Fin cast
- Released: 2006
- Recorded: 2006
- Genres: Pop, Latin
- Length: 30:47
- Label: EMI Music
- Producer: Cris Morena

Chiquititas Sin Fin cast chronology
Chiquititas 2001 (2001)	24 Horas (2006)

Chiquititas Sin Fin featured new versions for earlier Chiquititas songs.

Track listing

1. "Chiquititas 2006"
2. "Corazón con Agujeritos"
3. "Todo Todo"
4. "Mentiritas"
5. "Amigas"
6. "Estoy Loco"
7. "Hasta Diez"
8. "Por Una Sola Vez"
9. "24 Horas"
10. "Dónde Estás"
11. "Había Una Vez"
12. "Malísima"
13. "Igual A Los Demás"
14. "Me Pasan Cosas"
15. "Volar Mejor"

=== Notes ===
The Chiquititas 2006 main theme is actually Jugate Conmigo's main theme rewritten for Chiquititas Sin Fin. Lili's theme "Donde Estás" is the only new song in the Sin Fin track listing.
