= 2000 in Brazilian television =

This is a list of Brazilian television related events from 2000.

== Events ==
- 6 January - SBT premieres at 10 PM American prison drama television series Oz. The program competes for audience share with Globo's "Linha Direta".
- 26 Abril - Rede Globo celebrates its 35th anniversary and inaugurates a new set for Jornal Nacional.
- 12 September - The Minister of Justice in the government of Fernando Henrique Cardoso, José Gregori, signs the Ordinance 796, which alters the rules for classifying television programs.
- 13 September - Rede Bandeirantes begins broadcasting the Summer Olympic Games with the event of the women's Olympic football tournament.
- 18 September - Rede Cultura celebrates 50 years of television in Brazil with a series of specials.
- 1 October 2000 - Rede Bandeirantes ends broadcasting the Summer Olympic Games.

== Debuts ==
=== International ===
- (United States) Law & Order: Special Victims Unit (Unknown)

== Television shows ==
=== 1970s ===
- Turma da Mônica (1976–present)

=== 1990s ===
- Malhação (1995–2020)
- Cocoricó (1996–2013)
- Chiquititas (1997–2001)

== Networks and services ==
=== Launches ===
Network	Type	Launch date	Notes	Source
National Geographic Channel	Cable and satellite	1 November		
MuchMusic Brasil	Cable and satellite	10 November		

=== Conversions and rebrandings ===
Old network name	New network name	Type	Conversion Date	Notes	Source

=== Closures ===
Network	Type	Closure date	Notes	Source
The SuperStation	Cable television	31 October		

== Ending this year ==
Rede Globo started on glasses from season 2000–2001.

== Births ==
Date	Name	Notability
February 9	Filipe Cavalcante	Actor, (Chiquititas)
March 7	Cínthia Cruz	Actress (Chiquititas)
March 19	Bárbara Maia	Actress, (Cinderela Pop), (Ricos de Amor), (Gaby Estrella), (Tudo por um Pop Star)
March 29	Caio Manhente	Actor, (O Sétimo Guardião), (Genesis)
April 16	Bruna Carvalho	Actress, (Chiquititas)
May 4	Ana Giulia Zortea	Actress
May 12	Ana Karolina Lannes	Actress, (Avenida Brasil), (Minha Mãe é uma Peça)
June 2	João Pedro Carvalho	Singer and Actor, (Chiquititas), (Sintonia)
June 14	Thomaz Costa	Actor, (Carrossel), (Patrulha Salvadora)
October 6	Klara Castanho	Actress, (Viver a Vida), (Amor a Vida), (É Fada!), (Mal Me Quer), (Tudo por um Pop Star)
October 30	Gustavo Daneluz	Actor, (Carrossel), (Patrulha Salvadora), (Dra. Darci)
November 6	Graciely Junqueira	Actress, (Cúmplices de um Resgate), (As Aventuras de Poliana)
December 21	Maitê Padilha	Actress, (Vítimas Digitais) (Gaby Estrella), (Tudo por um Pop Star)
December 28	Larissa Manoela	Actress and Singer, (Carrossel), (Cúmplices de um Resgate), (As Aventuras de Poliana) and movies
December 29	Lucas Santos	Actor, (Carrossel), (Patrulha Salvadora)

== See also ==
- 2000 in Brazil
- List of Brazilian films of 2000
