= List of 2016 box office number-one films in Brazil =

This is a list of films which have placed number one at the weekend box office in Brazil during 2016.

== Films ==
†	This implies the highest-grossing movie of the year.

Week	Weekend End Date	Film	Total weekend gross (Brazilian real)	Weekend openings in the Top 10	Reference(s)
1	3 January 2016	Star Wars: The Force Awakens	R$14,223,206	Miss You Already (#2)	
2	10 January 2016	Star Wars: The Force Awakens	R$9,576,866	Spotlight (#2)	
3	17 January 2016	The Peanuts Movie	R$39,001,004	Creed (#4), The Big Short (#6)	
4	24 January 2016	The 5th Wave	R$32,051,848	Reza a Lenda (#6), Joy (#7)	
5	31 January 2016	Os Dez Mandamentos †	R$44,935,680	Point Break (#4), Daddy's Home (#5)	
6	7 February 2016	Os Dez Mandamentos †	R$29,875,787	The Revenant (#2), Dirty Grandpa (#10)	
7	14 February 2016	Deadpool	R$51,615,313	Um Suburbano Sortudo (#4), The Danish Girl (#6), Brooklyn (#8)	
8	21 February 2016	Deadpool	R$38,067,624	The Boy (#5), The Finest Hours (#7), Room (#8), 13 Hours: The Secret Soldiers of Benghazi (#9)	
9	28 February 2016	Deadpool	R$32,719,565	Gods of Egypt (#2), How to Be Single (#6), Solace (#10)	
10	6 March 2016	Kung Fu Panda 3	R$37,987,985	Fifty Shades of Black (#5), The Witch (#7)	
11	13 March 2016	The Divergent Series: Allegiant	R$32,447,089		
12	20 March 2016	Zootopia	R$29,631,807	Risen (#7)	
13	27 March 2016	Batman v Superman: Dawn of Justice	R$61,616,850	The Young Messiah (#10)	
14	3 April 2016	Batman v Superman: Dawn of Justice	R$37,241,106	My Big Fat Greek Wedding 2 (#4), Norm of the North (#6), Backtrack (#8), Eddie the Eagle (#10)	
15	10 April 2016	Batman v Superman: Dawn of Justice	R$29,362,636	London Has Fallen (#3), 10 Cloverfield Lane (#4), God's Not Dead 2 (#5), Eye in the Sky (#9), The Lady in the Van (#10)	
16	17 April 2016	The Jungle Book	R$24,442,647	Escaravelho Do Diabo (#7), Hail, Caesar! (#8), Criminal (#9), Truman (#10)	
17	24 April 2016	The Jungle Book	R$36,544,196	Em Nome da Lei (#5), Atrapa la bandera (#6), Miracles from Heaven (#7)	
18	1 May 2016	Captain America: Civil War	R$53,026,525		
19	8 May 2016	Captain America: Civil War	R$35,629,799	Mother's Day (#5), Ratchet & Clank (#7), Martyrs (#8)	
20	15 May 2016	Captain America: Civil War	R$32,159,468	The Angry Birds Movie (#2), Remember (#9)	
21	22 May 2016	X-Men: Apocalypse	R$39,034,293	Neighbors 2: Sorority Rising (#4), The Dressmaker (#7), Fathers and Daughters (#10)	
22	29 May 2016	X-Men: Apocalypse	R$45,533,818	Alice Through the Looking Glass (#2), Money Monster (#5), Peppa Pig: The Golden Boots (#6), The Girl in the Book (#10)	
23	5 June 2016	Warcraft	R$27,712,597	Uma Loucura de Mulher (#6)	
24	12 June 2016	The Conjuring 2	R$36,685,919	Now You See Me 2 (#2)	
25	19 June 2016	Me Before You	R$36,269,896	Teenage Mutant Ninja Turtles: Out of the Shadows (#3), Mais Forte que o Mundo - A História de José Aldo (#5), Tini: The Movie (#9)	
26	26 June 2016	Independence Day: Resurgence	R$31,923,050	Marguerite (#10)	
27	3 July 2016	Finding Dory	R$45,786,914	Porta dos Fundos: Contrato Vitalício (#4)	
28	10 July 2016	Finding Dory	R$44,648,247	Ice Age: Collision Course (#2), Julieta (#8), Florence Foster Jenkins (#9)	
29	17 July 2016	Finding Dory	R$42,030,744	Ghostbusters (#3), Carrossel 2: O Sumiço de Maria Joaquina (#4)	
30	24 July 2016	The Legend of Tarzan	R$39,864,528	The Nice Guys (#7), Entre Idas e Vindas (#8)	
31	31 July 2016	The Legend of Tarzan	R$34,567,015	The BFG (#4), Jason Bourne (#5), Mike and Dave Need Wedding Dates (#8)	
32	7 August 2016	Suicide Squad	R$50,223,334	A Hologram for the King (#9)	
33	14 August 2016	Suicide Squad	R$29,904,064	Central Intelligence (#2), Bad Moms (#8), Un gallo con muchos huevos (#10)	
34	21 August 2016	Suicide Squad	R$25,709,177	Ben-Hur (#2), Lights Out (#3)	
35	28 August 2016	The Secret Life of Pets	R$32,982,805	The Shallows (#5), Nerve (#6), Café Society (#7)	
36	4 September 2016	The Secret Life of Pets	R$31,286,411	Star Trek Beyond (#2), Um Namorado para Minha Mulher (#5), Aquarius (#10)	
37	9 September 2016	The Secret Life of Pets	R$18,924,902	Don't Breathe (#2)	
38	18 September 2016	The Secret Life of Pets	R$18,924,902	Blair Witch (#2), Desculpe o Transtorno (#7), The Infiltrator (#9)	
39	25 September 2016	Storks	TDB	The Magnificent Seven (#2), I'm Rich (#3)	
40	2 October 2016	Miss Peregrine's Home for Peculiar Children	TDB	Bridget Jones's Baby (#6), Pete's Dragon (#7)	
41	9 October 2016	Miss Peregrine's Home for Peculiar Children	TDB	It's a Fairy! (#2), Mechanic: Resurrection (#5), Sausage Party (#9)	
42	16 October 2016	Inferno	TDB	Kubo and the Two Strings (#5), O Shaolin do Sertão (#10)	
43	23 October 2016	Inferno	TDB	The Accountant (#2), Ouija: Origin of Evil (#4)	
44	30 October 2016	Trolls	TDB	The Girl on the Train (#3), Skiptrace (#10)	
45	6 November 2016	Doctor Strange	TDB	The Light Between Oceans (#8)	
46	13 November 2016	Doctor Strange	TDB	Deepwater Horizon (#3), Little Secret (#6), I.T. (#8), Snowden (#9)	
47	20 November 2016	Fantastic Beasts and Where to Find Them	TDB	Under Pressure (#9)	
48	27 November 2016	Fantastic Beasts and Where to Find Them	TDB	Jack Reacher: Never Go Back (#3), Arrival (#4), Elis (#5), The Disappointments Room (#7)	
49	4 December 2016	Fantastic Beasts and Where to Find Them	TDB	Underworld: Blood Wars (#2), The Wild Life (#7), O Último Virgem (#8)	
50	11 December 2016	Fantastic Beasts and Where to Find Them	TDB	The Dreamseller (#3), Office Christmas Party (#4), Fallen (#5), Masha e o Urso: O Filme (#6)	
51	18 December 2016	Rogue One: A Star Wars Story	TDB	Sully (#3)	
52	25 December 2016	Sing	TDB	My Mom Is a Character 2 (#2), Train to Busan (#7), Captain Fantastic (#9)	
53	29 December - 1 January 2017	My Mom Is a Character 2	TDB	Nocturnal Animals (#6)	
