= Mothern =

Mothern may refer to:

- Mothern, Bas-Rhin, a commune in the Bas-Rhin department of north-eastern France
- Mothern (TV series), a Brazilian comedy television series
