= As Aventuras de Poliana =

Brazilian television series

- Genre: Telenovela
- Based on: Pollyanna by Eleanor H. Porter
- Written by: Íris Abravanel
- Directed by: Reynaldo Boury; Ricardo Mantoanelli (season 2)
- Starring: Sophia Valverde
- Opening theme: "Meu Nome é Poliana" by Sophia Valverde
- Country of origin: Brazil
- Original language: Portuguese
- No. of seasons: 1
- No. of episodes: 564

Production
- Production locations: CDT da Anhanguera, Osasco, Brazil
- Camera setup: Multi-camera
- Production company: SBT

Original release
- Network: SBT
- Release: 16 May 2018 – 13 July 2020

As Aventuras de Poliana (English: The Adventures of Poliana) is a Brazilian telenovela written by Íris Abravanel, based on the 1913 novel Pollyanna by Eleanor H. Porter. Sophia Valverde stars as the titular character. It premiered on SBT on 16 May 2018. On 2 October 2019, SBT announced that the telenovela was renewed for a second season and that it would be based on the 1915 novel Pollyanna Grows Up. The second season was later titled as Poliana Moça, which premiered in 2022.

The telenovela tells the story of Poliana, a girl who loses her parents and lives with her aunt, Luísa, in São Paulo. It also has the mystery of Mr. Pendleton, the confusions of the club MaGaBeLo and the story of João, a boy who leaves Ceará by himself to seek new adventures in Sao Paulo after meeting his friend, Poliana, by chance.

== Plot ==
Poliana is a very positive 11-year-old girl and daughter of the multi-talented artist couple formed by director and actor Lorenzo and actress Alice. Together they formed the Vagalume Troupe, a traveling theatre show. Although the family is united and happy, they face constant financial troubles. In order to not be discouraged and to face problems in a lighter way, Lorenzo and Alice teach Poliana a game to always play in difficult times: the glad game, which consists in being able to see the bright side of everything, especially in the most unpleasant situations. The troupe chooses a forgotten and peaceful county of the Ceará backlands for their next performance. Poliana meets João, a humble boy from the local village, who is passing by and is enchanted by the music of the performance. João has a strong personality and lives in a shack in the middle of the northeastern backwoods under the care of his rude father Tião and submissive mother, Josefa. At a young age, João is forced to drop out of school and help his father with farm work and house chores. However, João develops an interest in music and his talent catches Josefa's eye. Poliana needs to go to São Paulo to live with her mother's relatives, the D'Avila family, since her mother has died and her father has fallen ill. Lorenzo tells his daughter to never give up on her dreams and stresses the importance that she never stops playing the glad game. João gets tired of his father's repression and decides to leave home. He promises his mother that he will return to give her a better life. Josefa is stunned, but realizes that out of that reality her son may be able to achieve his dreams and develop his talents. João then follows on the back of a truck his own adventure to São Paulo.

Poliana and João arrive at the same time, but separately, to São Paulo. The two are already faced with many adventures that will change the reality and dreams they had before facing their journey. Poliana realizes that not everyone is kind as her parents, and that the glad game is increasingly necessary and difficult to play. While João will have to deal with the danger coming from the streets to fight for his dreams and fulfill the promise made to Josefa. In the midst of this adventure, Poliana and João bump into each other and fate seems to reunite them once more and they begin their friendship again. Poliana lives with her aunt Luisa D'Avila, Alice's sister, but is greeted with coldness and displeasure. Luisa makes it clear that she does not like Poliana's presence in her mansion. Poliana is forced to obey numerous rules and set times. Luisa lies about the rest of the family and says that her brother lives in China and so the two have no contact. Nanci and Antonio, servants of the mansion, are the ones that bring some relief to the Poliana's loneliness.

Walking around the neighborhood, Poliana stumbles upon a serious and very reserved man with his dog, Mr. Pendleton, resident of Mansion 242, one of the largest in the area. Mr. Pendleton is the target of investigations by the boys of the MaGaBeLo Club. Unbeknownst to her aunt, Poliana also goes to the neighborhood bakery, "Ora Pães, Pães", a cozy place run by Durval. What Poliana has no idea is that Durval is her uncle, the brother that Luisa says is in China. Durval has two daughters Raquel and Lorena, unknown cousins of Poliana. Throughout the series, Poliana faces numerous challenges at school, in friendships and in her own family. She feels obligated to find a home for João, reunite her aunt and uncle again, and unravel the mystery of Luisa's old love so that she can reconnect again and no longer be alone. Even in the midst of difficulties and adapting to a new reality, Poliana always tries to see the bright side of life and spread the good message of the glad game wherever she goes.

== Cast ==
- Sophia Valverde as Poliana D'Ávila Andrade
- Ígor Jansen as João Barros
- Larissa Manoela as Mirela "Mi" Delfino
- João Guilherme Ávila as Luca Della Torre
- Vincenzo Richy as Vinicius "Vini" Almeida
- Milena Toscano as Luisa D'Ávila (episodes 1–94)
- Thaís Melchior as Luisa D'Ávila
- Murilo Cezar as Marcelo Pessoa
- Victor Pecoraro as Afonso Moraes
- Lisandra Parede as Débora Pavão
- Dalton Vigh as Otto Monteiro / Mr. Pendleton
- Lawrran Couto as Guilherme "Gui" Pessoa Mautner
- Bella Moreira as Raquel "Quel" D'Ávila Rios
- Flavia Pavanelli as Brenda Castanheira Telles Pessoa
- Rafaela Ferreira as Nanci Delfino
- Myrian Rios as Ruth Goulart
- Lilian Blanc as Branca Delfinof
- Marat Descartes as Durval D'Ávila
- Enzo Krieger as Luigi Antunes
- Duda Pimenta as Kessya Soares
- Bela Fernandes as Filipa Pessoa Mautner
- Lucas Burgatti as Éric Von Burgo
- Mylla Christie as Verônica Pessoa Mautner
- Otávio Martins as Roger Pessoa
- Guilherme Boury as Sérgio Antunes
- Daniela Paschoal as Joana Antunes
- Ricardo Dantas as Manoel D'Ávila
- Mira Haar as Isadora D'Ávila
- Clarisse Abujamra as Glória Pessoa
- Theo Medon as Mário Antunes
- Vinícius Siqueira as Gael Ferreira
- Kauan Siqueira as Benício Ferreira
- Pietra Quintela as Lorena D'Ávila Rios
- Bia Lanutti as Yasmim Ferreira
- Gracielly Junqueira as Gabriela "Gabi"
- Jitman Vibranovski as Antônio "Tonho" Novaes
- Maria Gal as Gleyce Soares
- Nando Cunha as Ciro Soares
- Letícia Tomazella as Arlete Pena
- Ivan Parente as Lindomar Pena
- Henry Fiuka as Hugo Franco Moraes
- Valentina Oliveira as Letícia
- Camily Vitória as Maria Vitória "Mavi" Siqueira
- Mariany Vitória as Maria Luísa "Malu" Siqueira
- Alanys Santos as Paola
- Davi Campolongo as Bento
- Vyni Takahashi as Micael Souza "Zóio"
- Luccas Papp as Luriclayton "Mosquito"
- Gil Teles as Falcão / Walter Elias
- Letícia Cannavale as Claudia "Clau" Ferreira
- Felipe Folgosi as Luciano Ferreira
- Pedro Lemos as Waldisney "Rato"
- Raquel Bertani as Nadine
- Eduardo Semerjian as Salvador
- Gabriela Petry as Sophie
- Emílio Farias as Iuri
- Elina de Souza as Heloísa "Helô" Oliver
- Bia Queiroz as Jessica
- Vítor Britto as Jeferson "Jeff" Soares
- Manu Kfouri as Stella/Polidroide
- Junno Andrade as Renato Araujo (season 2)
- Amanda Acosta as Eugênia Rogatto (season 2)
- Marcello Airoldi as Davi Rogatto (season 2)
- Bella Chiang as Song Park (season 2)
- Luisa Bresser as Helena Rogatto (season 2)
- Mariana Campolongo as Chloe Rogatto (season 2)
- Otávio Martins as Pedro Rogatto (season 2)
- Allana Lopes as Celeste Silva (season 2)
- Thiago Franzé as André Siqueira (season 2)
- João Pedro Delfino as Pinóquio (season 2)

== Production ==
The telenovela began pre-production in late 2016 and was initially titled As Aventuras de Pollyanna e João Feijão. The preference was for the protagonist to be about 11-years-old, to resemble the original work. Some episodes have a budget of approximately 120 to 280,000 reals. The cast was presented on 6 September 2017. Filming began in Fortaleza on 26 September 2017. The first season will consist of between 500 and 700 episodes that will be broadcast over two to three years. On 2 October 2019 it was announced that the telenovela was renewed for a second season. Filming of the first season concluded on 21 December 2019, the actors would then take a break from filming. On 17 March 2020, it was announced that filming of the second season was suspended due to the COVID-19 pandemic, only one week after filming of the season had begun. Because of the suspension, the premiere of the second season was delayed to 2021.

=== Casting ===
In late 2016, Larissa Manoela was initially chosen as the protagonist of the telenovela. Directors then decided to give her another role in the telenovela, since the title character in the book is only 11-years-old, while Manoela was 16 at the time and failed to look younger. Changing the character's age would be impossible as it would also change the entire timeline of the story. Sophia Valverde was eventually announced as the protagonist. In January 2017, casting began for the selection of the other characters. Mel Lisboa was invited to portray Luisa, but the actress declined because she could not be absent from her theater commitments every day of the week. Milena Toscano, who had previously turned down a supporting role in Cúmplices de um Resgate to star in O Rico e Lázaro on RecordTV, was cast as Luisa. Igor Rickli was called to portray Afonso, but the actor preferred to renew his contract with RecordTV, passing the role to Victor Pecoraro, who had been dismissed by the same channel.

=== Milena Toscano's pregnancy ===
In March 2018, Milena Toscano discovered that she was pregnant and had to abandon the cast, with the fate unknown for her character, who was part of the main plot. Originally the director planned to film as many scenes with Toscano as possible and explain the absence of the character at some point as a business trip, but the actress ruled out returning to filming weeks after maternity leave, thus officially leaving the telenovela. On 19 May 2018, it was announced that Thaís Melchior would replace Toscano in the role of Luisa.

== Ratings ==
Season	Episodes	First aired		Last aired	
Season	Episodes	Date	Viewers (in points)	Date	Viewers (in points)
1	564	16 May 2018	15	13 July 2020	TBD
