= Just Like Our Parents =

2017 film

- Film poster
- Directed by: Laís Bodanzky
- Written by: Laís Bodanzky
- Starring: Maria Ribeiro; Clarisse Abujamra; Paulo Vilhena; Felipe Rocha
- Cinematography: Pedro J. Márquez
- Edited by: Rodrigo Menecucci
- Release dates: 11 February 2017 (Berlin); 31 August 2017 (Brazil)
- Running time: 102 minutes
- Country: Brazil
- Language: Portuguese
- Box office: $724,223

Just Like Our Parents (Portuguese: Como Nossos Pais) is a 2017 Brazilian drama film directed by Laís Bodanzky. It was screened in the Panorama section at the 67th Berlin International Film Festival.

== Cast ==
- Maria Ribeiro as Rosa
- Paulo Vilhena as "Dado"
- Clarisse Abujamra as Clarice
- Felipe Rocha as Pedro
- Jorge Mautner as Homero
- Herson Capri as Roberto Nathan
- Sophia Valverde as Nara
- Annalara Prates as Juliana
