= Thaís Melchior =

Brazilian actress

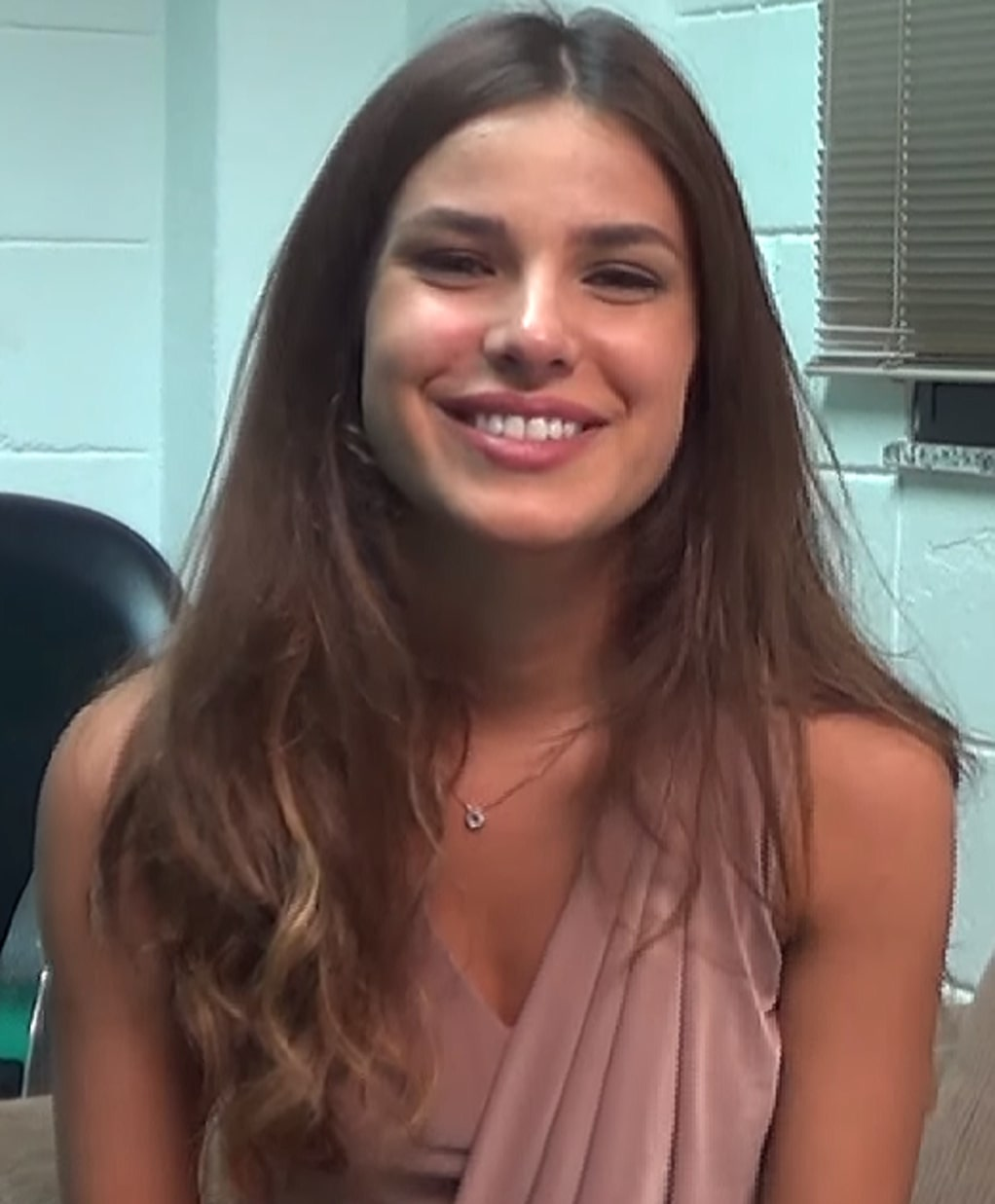
- Melchior in 2014
- Born: Thaís de Souza Melchior Affonso; 2 November 1990 (age 34); Rio de Janeiro, Brazil
- Other names: Thata
- Occupation: Atriz
- Years active: 2009–present
- Known for: As aventuras de poliana
- Height: 1.61 m (5 ft 3 1/2 in)
- Spouse: Alex Gruli (2019–present)

Thaís de Souza Melchior Affonso (Rio de Janeiro, 2 November 1990) is a Brazilian actress.

== Filmography ==
Television roles
Year	Title	Role	Notes
2009	Caras & Bocas	Noiva	
2009	Viver a Vida	Modelo	
2009	Beijo, Me Liga	Tainá Castro	
2010	Malhação ID	Lissa	
2010	A Vida Alheia	Amália	Episode: "A Luz que Não se Apaga"
2011–2012	Malhação Conectados	Cristal Vianna	
2013	Saramandaia	Beatriz de Souza	
2014–2015	Vitória	Diana Ferreira	
2016–2017	A Terra Prometida	Aruna	
2017	Apocalipse	Melina	
2018–2020	As Aventuras de Poliana	Luísa D'Avila	
2021	Gênesis	Raquel	
2022–2023	Poliana Moça	Luísa D'Avila	
