= Meus 15 Anos =

2017 film directed by Caroline Okoshi Fioratti

- Directed by: Caroline Okoshi Fioratti
- Screenplay by: Caroline Okoshi Fioratti; Clara Deák; Luiza Trigo; Marcelo Andrade; Mirna Nogueira
- Based on: Meus 15 Anos by Luiza Trigo
- Produced by: Jatir Eiró; Renata Rezende
- Starring: Larissa Manoela; Daniel Botelho; Clara Caldas; Rafael Infante; Bruno Peixoto; Victor Meyniel; Anitta
- Distributed by: Downtown Filmes; SBT Filmes; Paris Filmes; Televisa
- Release date: June 15, 2017 (Brazil)
- Running time: 103 minutes
- Country: Brazil
- Language: Portuguese
- Box office: R$2,707,996

Meus 15 Anos (transl. My 15 Years) is a 2017 Brazilian teen comedy-drama film directed by Caroline Okoshi Fioratti, based on the novel of the same name by Luiza Trigo. It stars Larissa Manoela, Daniel Botelho, Clara Caldas, Bruno Peixoto, Rafael Infante, Victor Meyniel, Polly Marinho, and Anitta.

The film was released on June 15, 2017. On October 12, 2017, the film became available on Netflix.

== Plot ==
A shy student suddenly becomes the center of attention when she wins a huge birthday party that she never asked for.

== Cast ==
- Larissa Manoela as Bia
  - Lorena Queiroz as young Bia
- Daniel Botelho as Bruno
- Clara Caldas as Jéssica
- Bruno Peixoto as Thiago
- Bruna Tatar as Rita
- Heslaine Vieira as Diana
- Rafael Awi as Heitor
- Pyong Lee as Fabio
- Rafael Infante as Edu
- Victor Meyniel as Joseph Charles
- Vinicius Henuns as Gael
- Polly Marinho as Kátia
- José Peregrín as Marcos
- Anitta as herself
