= Walmor Chagas =

Brazilian actor

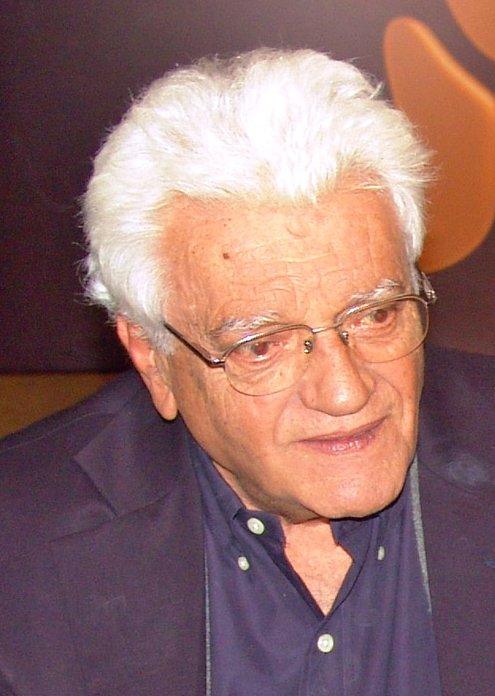
- Chagas in 2006
- Born: Walmor de Souza Chagas; 28 August 1930; Porto Alegre, Rio Grande do Sul, Brazil
- Died: 18 January 2013 (aged 82); Guaratinguetá, São Paulo, Brazil
- Occupations: Actor, director, producer
- Years active: 1965–2012
- Spouse: Cacilda Becker (m. 1956; died 1969)
- Children: 1

Walmor de Souza Chagas (28 August 1930 – 18 January 2013) was a Brazilian actor, director, and producer. He appeared in more than 50 films and television shows between 1965 and 2012.

In 1956 he was awarded the Prêmio Saci, among the most prestigious awards in Brazilian cinema in the 1950s and 1960s.

Chagas died on 18 January 2013, at his home in Guaratinguetá, São Paulo. He was found with a bullet wound in the head. It is believed that he committed suicide.

== Filmography ==
Year	Title	Role	Notes
1965	São Paulo, Sociedade Anônima	Carlos	
1970	Beto Rockfeller		
1973	Mestiça, a Escrava Indomável	Gonçalves	
1974	Um Homem Célebre	Pestana	
1976	Xica da Silva	Comendador João Fernandes	
1980	Asa Branca: Um Sonho Brasileiro	Isaías	
1981	Memórias do Medo	Raul Pratis	
1982	Filhos e Amantes	Cláudio	
1982	Luz del Fuego	Senator João Gaspar	
1983	Parahyba Mulher Macho	João Pessoa	
1984	Patriamada	Rocha Queiroz	
1988	Banana Split		
1990	Beijo 2348/72	Supreme court judge	
1993	Sonho Meu	Afrânio Guerra	TV series
1994	Mil e Uma		
1997	Malhação		(Participação Especial)
2001	Memórias Póstumas	Dr. Vilaça	
2002	Histórias do Olhar	Frederico	
2002	Esperança	Giuseppe	TV series
2007	Valsa para Bruno Stein	Bruno Stein	
2007	Caminhos do Coração	Dr, Sócrates Mayer	TV series
2008	Bodas de Papel	Sr. Arnaldo	
2008	A Favorita	Dr. Salvatore	TV series
2012	Cara ou Coroa	Lilian's grandfather	
2012	A Coleção Invisível	Samir	
2015	Chatô, o Rei do Brasil	Militar	
