= 2000 in Brazil =

Events in the year 2000 in Brazil.

== Incumbents ==
=== Federal government ===
- President: Fernando Henrique Cardoso
- Vice President: Marco Maciel

=== Governors ===
- Acre: Jorge Viana
- Alagoas: Ronaldo Lessa
- Amapa: João Capiberibe
- Amazonas: Amazonino Mendes
- Bahia: César Borges
- Ceará: Tasso Jereissati
- Espírito Santo: José Ignácio Ferreira
- Goiás: Marconi Perillo
- Maranhão: Roseana Sarney
- Mato Grosso: Dante de Oliveira
- Mato Grosso do Sul: José Orcírio Miranda dos Santos
- Minas Gerais: Itamar Franco
- Pará: Almir Gabriel
- Paraíba: José Maranhão
- Paraná: Jaime Lerner
- Pernambuco: Jarbas Vasconcelos
- Piauí: Mão Santa
- Rio de Janeiro: Anthony Garotinho
- Rio Grande do Norte:Garibaldi Alves Filho
- Rio Grande do Sul: Olívio Dutra
- Rondônia: José de Abreu Bianco
- Roraima: Neudo Ribeiro Campos
- Santa Catarina: Esperidião Amin
- São Paulo: Mário Covas
- Sergipe: Albano Franco
- Tocantins: José Wilson Siqueira Campos

=== Vice governors ===
- Acre: Edison Simão Cadaxo
- Alagoas: Geraldo Costa Sampaio
- Amapá: Maria Dalva de Souza Figueiredo
- Amazonas: Samuel Assayag Hanan
- Bahia: Otto Alencar
- Ceará: Benedito Clayton Veras Alcântara
- Espírito Santo: Celso José Vasconcelos
- Goiás: Alcides Rodrigues Filho
- Maranhão: José Reinaldo Carneiro Tavares
- Mato Grosso: José Rogério Sales
- Mato Grosso do Sul: Moacir Kohl
- Minas Gerais: Newton Cardoso
- Pará: Hildegardo de Figueiredo Nunes
- Paraíba: Antônio Roberto de Sousa Paulino
- Paraná: Emília de Sales Belinati
- Pernambuco: José Mendonça Bezerra Filho
- Piauí: Osmar Ribeiro de Almeida Júnior
- Rio de Janeiro: Benedita da Silva
- Rio Grande do Norte: Fernando Freire
- Rio Grande do Sul: Miguel Soldatelli Rossetto
- Rondônia: Miguel de Souza
- Roraima: Francisco Flamarion Portela
- Santa Catarina: Paulo Roberto Bauer
- São Paulo: Geraldo Alckmin
- Sergipe: Benedito de Figueiredo
- Tocantins: João Lisboa da Cruz

== Events ==
=== January ===
- January 18: A leak in a Petrobrás pipeline spills more than 500,000 liters of oil into Guanabara Bay, in the state of Rio de Janeiro, the worst environmental accident since 1975.

=== March ===
- March 10: Nicéia Pitta denounces corruption in the administration of the mayor of São Paulo and her ex-husband Celso Pitta, who was removed from office by the justice system for 18 days.

=== April ===
- April 9: A 6-year-old boy is attacked and devoured by lions at a circus in Jaboatão dos Guararapes, Pernambuco.
- April 22: The 500th anniversary of the Discovery of Brazil takes place in Porto Seguro, Bahia. Clashes and technical problems with a replica of Pedro Álvares Cabral's ship turn the celebrations into a disaster.

=== June ===
- June 10: A plane crash in Maripá de Minas kills actor and swimmer Rômulo Arantes and co-pilot Fábio Amorim Ruivo.
- June 12: Bus line 174 is hijacked by Sandro Barbosa do Nascimento, who held ten hostages for four hours, in Jardim Botânico, Rio de Janeiro.
- June 28: The Federal Senate revokes the mandate of Senator Luiz Estêvão for breach of parliamentary decorum, by 52 votes to 18. This is the first time in Brazilian history that a member of the house loses his position.
- 30 June: Brazil and Argentina sign an agreement to promote and enhance trade in the automotive industry.

=== July ===
- July 28: A runaway CPTM train collides with another at the Perus Station in São Paulo, killing 9 people and leaving 115 injured.

=== August ===
- August 18: A VASP Boeing 737-2A1 (registration PP-SMG) en route from Foz do Iguaçu to Afonso Pena International Airport in Curitiba is hijacked by 5 people with the purpose of robbing BRL 5 million (approximately US$2.75 million) that the aircraft was transporting. The pilot is forced to land at Porecatu where the hijackers fled with the money. No one was injured.

=== October ===
- October 1: The first round of elections for mayors and councilors across the country take place.
- October 29: The second round of mayoral elections take place in 31 cities across the country.

=== November ===
- November 21: Banco Banespa is privatized by the Cardoso administration and sold to the Spanish bank Santander for a bid of R$7.05 billion.

=== December ===
- December 8: Retired judge Nicolau dos Santos Neto surrenders to federal agents in Rio Grande do Sul, after being accused of embezzlement. He is arrested in São Paulo after spending 227 days on the run.
- December 30: Around the 23 minute mark of the Copa João Havelange final (equivalent to the Brazilian Championship of the season), between Vasco da Gama and São Caetano, a part of the fence at the São Januário Stadium falls and disrupts the game. The game is suspended by order of Rio de Janeiro governor Anthony Garotinho and rescheduled for January of the following year.

== Births ==
=== January ===
- January 16 – Brenner, footballer

=== February ===
- February 23 – Antony, footballer

=== May ===
- May 23 – Felipe Drugovich, racing driver

=== July ===
- July 12 – Vinícius Júnior, footballer
- July 15 – Paulinho, footballer

== Deaths ==
=== February ===
- February 26: Casimiro Montenegro Filho, army and air force officer, 95

=== April ===
- April 4: Brandãozinho, footballer, 74
- April 8: Moacir Barbosa Nascimento, footballer, 79

=== May ===
- May 1: Cláudio Christovam de Pinho, footballer, 77
- May 18: Domingos da Guia, footballer, 87

=== June ===
- June 10: Rômulo Arantes, swimmer and actor, 42
- June 12: Sandro Rosa do Nascimento, hijacker, 21
- June 25: Wilson Simonal, singer, 62

=== July ===
- July 6: Barbosa Lima Sobrinho, lawyer and historian, 103
- July 17: Dona Neuma, samba dancer, 78

=== September ===
- September 26: Baden Powell, guitarist, 63

=== December ===
- December 21: Décio Esteves, footballer, 73

== See also ==
- 2000 in Brazilian football
- 2000 in Brazilian television
- List of Brazilian films of 2000
