= The Secret Diary of an Exchange Student =

- Directed by: Bruno Garotti
- Written by: Bruno Garotti; Sylvio Gonçalves
- Starring: Larissa Manoela; Thati Lopes; Bruno Montaleone
- Distributed by: Netflix
- Release date: August 18, 2021
- Running time: 96 minutes
- Country: Brazil
- Languages: Portuguese; English

The Secret Diary of an Exchange Student is a 2021 Brazilian comedy film directed by Bruno Garotti, written by Bruno Garotti and Sylvio Gonçalves and starring Larissa Manoela, Thati Lopes and Bruno Montaleone.

== Cast ==
- Larissa Manoela as Barbara
- Thati Lopes as Taila
- Bruno Montaleone as Lucas
- David Sherod as Brad (as David James)
- Kathy-Ann Hart as Sheryll
- Valeria Silva as Henza
- Ray Faiola as Jeff
- Noa Graham as Martha
- Maiara Walsh as Kat
- Emanuelle Araújo as Zoraia
- Tim Eliot as Mr. Fields
- Marcos Oliveira as Seu Hélio
- Flávia Garrafa as Regina
- Henry Jackelén as Agente Consular
