= Corações Feridos =

- Created by: Íris Abravanel; Based on the original by Caridad Bravo Adams
- Directed by: Del Rangel
- Starring: Patrícia Barros; Flávio Tolezani; Cynthia Falabella and others
- Opening theme: Coisa de Deus by Rick and Renner
- Country of origin: Brazil
- Original language: Portuguese
- No. of episodes: 93

Original release
- Network: SBT
- Release: January 16 – May 23, 2012

Related
- La mentira (1965); El amor nunca muere (1982); La Mentira (1998); El juramento (2008); Cuando me enamoro (2010); Lo imperdonable (2015)

Corações Feridos (Wounded Hearts) is a Brazilian telenovela that was broadcast on SBT from January 16 to May 23, 2012. It is a remake of the Mexican telenovela La mentira written and adapted by Íris Abravanel, based on the original by Caridad Bravo Adams and directed by Del Rangel.

== Cast ==
Actor/actress	Role
Flávio Tolezani	Eduardo Sotelli
Patrícia Barros	Amanda Almeida Varela
Cynthia Falabella	Aline Almeida Varela
Jacqueline Dalabona	Vera Almeida Varela
Paulo Coronato	Olavo Almeida Varela
Victor Pecoraro	Vitor Almeida Varela
Ronaldo Oliva	Flávio Souza
Lílian Fernandes	Lucy Ferreira
Elaine Mickely	Eloísa Gonçalves
Marco Antônio Pâmio	Dr. Michel Batista
Eda Nagayama	Regina Batista
Antônio Abujamra	Dante Vasconcelos
Iara Jamra	Loreta
Beto Nasci	Glauco Lancastro
Lívia Andrade	Janaína Correia
Cláudio Andrade	Luciano Alves
Lena Whitaker	Maria
Junno Andrade	Eliseu
Larissa Manoela	Viviane (Vivi)
Jacqueline Sato	Bianca Yokoyama
Rita Batata	Camila Reis
Bruno Autran	Dinho (Augusto)
Milena Ferrari	Priscila Lancastro
Elizabeth Hartmann	Tita
Blota Filho	Hélio
César Negro	Yuri
Adriana Lessa	Sílvia
Isabeau Christine	Glória
Fran Landin	Daniel
Ricardo Homuth	Diego
Marcello Góes	Ronaldo (Roni)
Simone Zucato	Cínira Reis
Alvise Camozzi	Nabal
Larissa Eberhardt Prado	Milla
Eliana Ferraz	Lídia (Dinho's mother)
Aiman Hammoud	Breno (Dinho's father)
Metturo	Théo
Kako Nolasco	Saulo
Vinicius Henuns	René
Paulo Zulu	Rodrigo Sotelli
