= Cynthia Falabella =

Brazilian actress

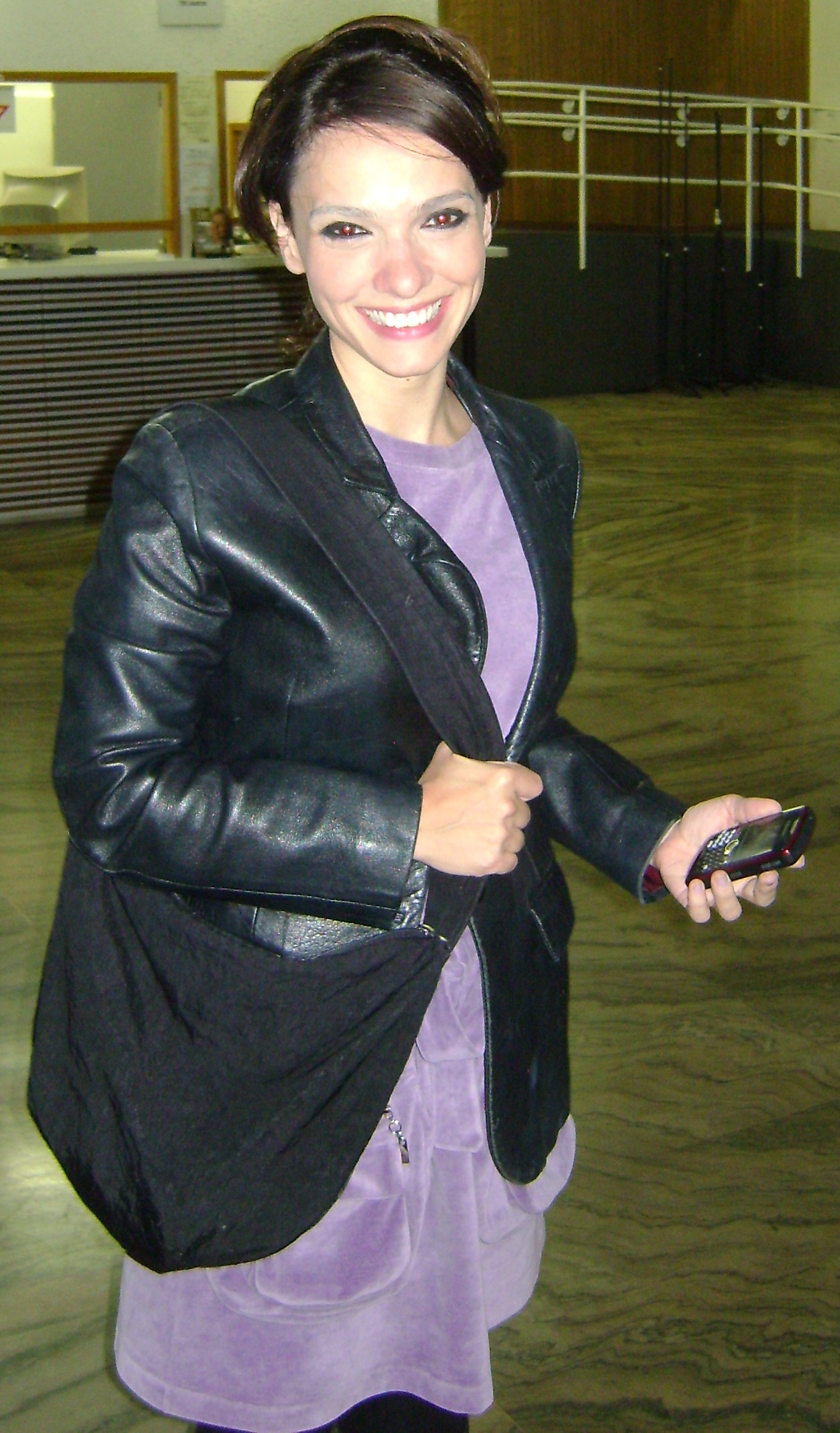
- Cynthia Falabella in 2010.
- Born: Cynthia Lima Falabella; January 19, 1972 (age 54); Belo Horizonte, Brazil
- Occupation: Actress
- Parent(s): Rogério Falabella; Maria Olympia
- Relatives: Débora Falabella (sister)

Cynthia Lima Falabella (born January 19, 1972) is a Brazilian actress. Born in Belo Horizonte, she is the daughter of actor Rogério Falabella and singer Maria Olympia, and the sister of actress Débora Falabella.

== Biography ==
In 2002, after nine years in the theater, Falabella gained wider recognition when she replaced her younger sister, Débora Falabella, who was hospitalized for a week with meningitis. Débora previously replaced her in a theater production of The Wizard of Oz as Dorothy Gale in 1998.

On television, Falabella appeared in the telenovela América (2005) and the television series Tempo Final (2008).

In cinema, she appeared in the short film O Quintal dos Guerrilheiros (2005), Os 12 Trabalhos (2006), Batismo de Sangue (2006), and 5 Frações de Uma Quase História (2007).

In 2008, she appeared in The Serpent, the last play written by playwright Nelson Rodrigues.

In 2010, she appeared in the Rede Globo television series A Vida Alheia and the film Chico Xavier. Later that year, she signed with SBT to appear in the telenovela Corações Feridos.

== Filmography ==
=== Television ===
Year	Title	Role	Notes
2002	O Clone	Mel Ferraz / Monique	Cameo
2005	América	Cidinha	
2008	Tempo Final	Andrea	Episode: "Poseida"
2010	A Vida Alheia	Myrna	Episode: "O Sequestro"
2011	Aquele Beijo	Estela Jardim	
2012	Corações Feridos	Aline Almeida Varela	
2012	(fdp)	Manuela	

=== Film ===
Year	Title	Role	Notes
1998	A Hora Vagabunda		Short film
2004	Aqueles Dias		
2005	Manual Para Atropelar Cachorro		Short film
2005	O Quintal dos Guerrilheiros	Magali	Short film
2006	Os 12 Trabalhos	Gêmeas	
2006	Batismo de Sangue	Jana	
2007	5 Frações de Uma Quase História	Lúcia	
2008	Quarto 38	Mari	Short film
2010	Chico Xavier	Professora	
2011	Essa Maldita Vontade de ser Pássaro	Clara	
2012	De Outros Carnavais	Narration	Short film

=== Theater ===
Year	Title
2006	O Tempo e Os Conways
2006	Jeca Voador
2007	Toalete
2008	A Serpente
2010	TOC TOC
2014	Bull

=== Awards ===
Year	Category	Awards	Title	Result
2008	Crystal Lens	Miami Brazilian Film Festival	5 Frações de Uma Quase História	Winner
