= Malu Galli =

Brazilian actress (born 1971)

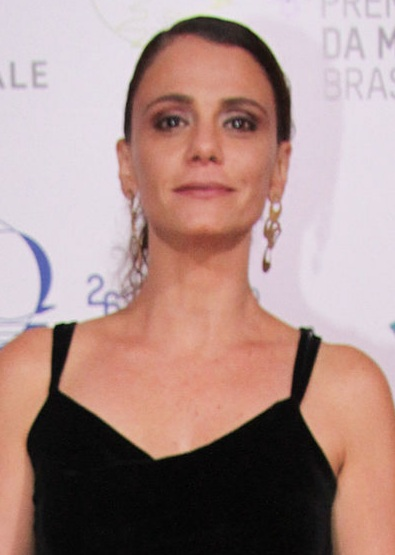
- Galli in 2015
- Born: Maria Luiza Reis Galli; 17 November 1971 (age 53); Rio de Janeiro, Brazil
- Occupation(s): Actress, playwright, director
- Years active: 1992–present
- Spouse: Afonso Tostes (m. 1999)
- Children: 1

Maria Luiza Reis Galli (born 17 November 1971) is a Brazilian actress, playwright, and stage director.

== Biography ==
Galli was born on 17 November 1971 in Rio de Janeiro.

== Career ==
Her debut project was in the miniseries Anos Rebeldes, where she portrayed Jurema. She got a major role in the telenovelas A Grande Família in 2001 and Carga Pesada in 2005.

== Filmography ==
=== Television ===
Year	Title	Role	Notes
1992	Anos Rebeldes	Jurema	
1994	Pátria Minha	Nanci	
1999	Andando nas Nuvens	Pregnant	Episodes: "May 31–June 1"
2005	Senhora do Destino	Nurse Lúcia	Episode: "March 5th"
2005	Carga Pesada	Marta	
2005–07	Mandrake	Flávia	
2006	Prova de Amor	Samanta	Episode: "February 10–11"
2007	A Grande Família	Brigitte	Episode: "Distraídos pelo Desejo"
2008	Queridos Amigos	Lúcia Ferraz	
2008	Três Irmãs	Lígia Pedreira "Liginha"	
2009–11	Aline	Dolores Silva	
2010	Tempos Modernos	Iolanda Paranhos	
2011	A Vida da Gente	Dora Reginato	
2012	As Brasileiras	Marilene	Episode: "A Viúva do Maranhão"
2012	Cheias de Charme	Lygia Mariz Ortega	
2013	Tapas & Beijos	Márcia	Episode: "April 16"
2013	A Mulher do Prefeito	Maria Fernanda	
2014–15	Questão de Família	Helena Salles	
2014	Império	Eliane dos Anjos	Episodes: "July 24–29"
2015	Sete Vidas	Irene Macedo	
2015-16	Totalmente Demais	Rosângela Castro	
2017–18	Malhação: Viva a Diferença	Marta Gutierrez	
2017	Cidade Proibida	Carla Parisi	Episode: "Caso Lupi"
2019-21	Amor de Mãe	Maria Lídia Camargo	
2020–24	As Five	Marta Gutierrez	
2022	Além da Ilusão	Violeta Camargo Tapajós Barbosa	
2022	Desalma	Mykhaila Lachovicz Felício	
2023	Acampamento de Magia para Jovens Bruxos	Dorotéia Goffi	
2024	Renascer	Meire Carvalho	
2025	Vale Tudo	Celina Aguiar Junqueira	

=== Cinema ===
Year	Title	Role	Notes
1998	Policarpo Quaresma, Herói do Brasil	Quinota	
2001	A Samba for Sherlock	Chiquinha Gonzaga	
2003	Maria, Mãe do Filho de Deus	Mary Magdalene	
2003	Harmada	Amanda	
2003	Dom	Heloísa	
2005	Achados e Perdidos	Vanessa	
2006	Cobrador: In God We Trust	Soraia	
2007	Maré, Nossa História de Amor	Maria Eugênia	
2008	Mulheres Sexo Verdades Mentiras	Beth	
2008	Areia	Alice	Short film
2009	O Contador de Histórias	Pérola	
2009	Ouro Negro - A Saga do Petróleo Brasileiro	Mariana Amorim Gosch	
2010	Outras Pessoas	—	As producer
2011	180°	Anna	
2018	Aos Teus Olhos	Ana	
2018	Paraíso Perdido	Nádia	
2020	Filme Ensaio	Herself	Documentary
2023	Seus Ossos e seus Olhos	Irene	
2023	Propriedade	Tereza	
2024	Dispersão	Ana	Post-production

== Stage ==
Year	Title	Character/Role
1991	Mann na praia	
1993	Banheiro Feminino	
1994	Minha Alma É Imortal	
1995	Melodrama	
1995	A Ver Estrelas	
1996	7x2=y - Uma Parábola que Passa pela Origem	
1997	A Noite de Todas as Ceias	
2000	O Rei da Vela	
2001	Meu Destino é Pecar	
2002	Uma Coisa que Não Tem Nome (e que se Perdeu)	
2002	Memorial do Convento	
2004–06	Conjugado	Actress and Creator
2004	Ensaio.Hamlet	
2005	E Agora Nada É Mais Uma Coisa Só	
2006	Gaivota – Tema Para um Conto Curto	
2007	Diálogos com Molly Bloom	Molly Bloom / creator
2010	A Máquina de Abraçar	Direction
2012–13	Oréstia	Clitemnestra / direction
2014–15	Nômades	
2019	Marta, Rosa e João	Actress and author
2023	A Cerimônia do Adeus	Aspázia
