= Larissa Manoela =

Brazilian actress and singer (born 2000)

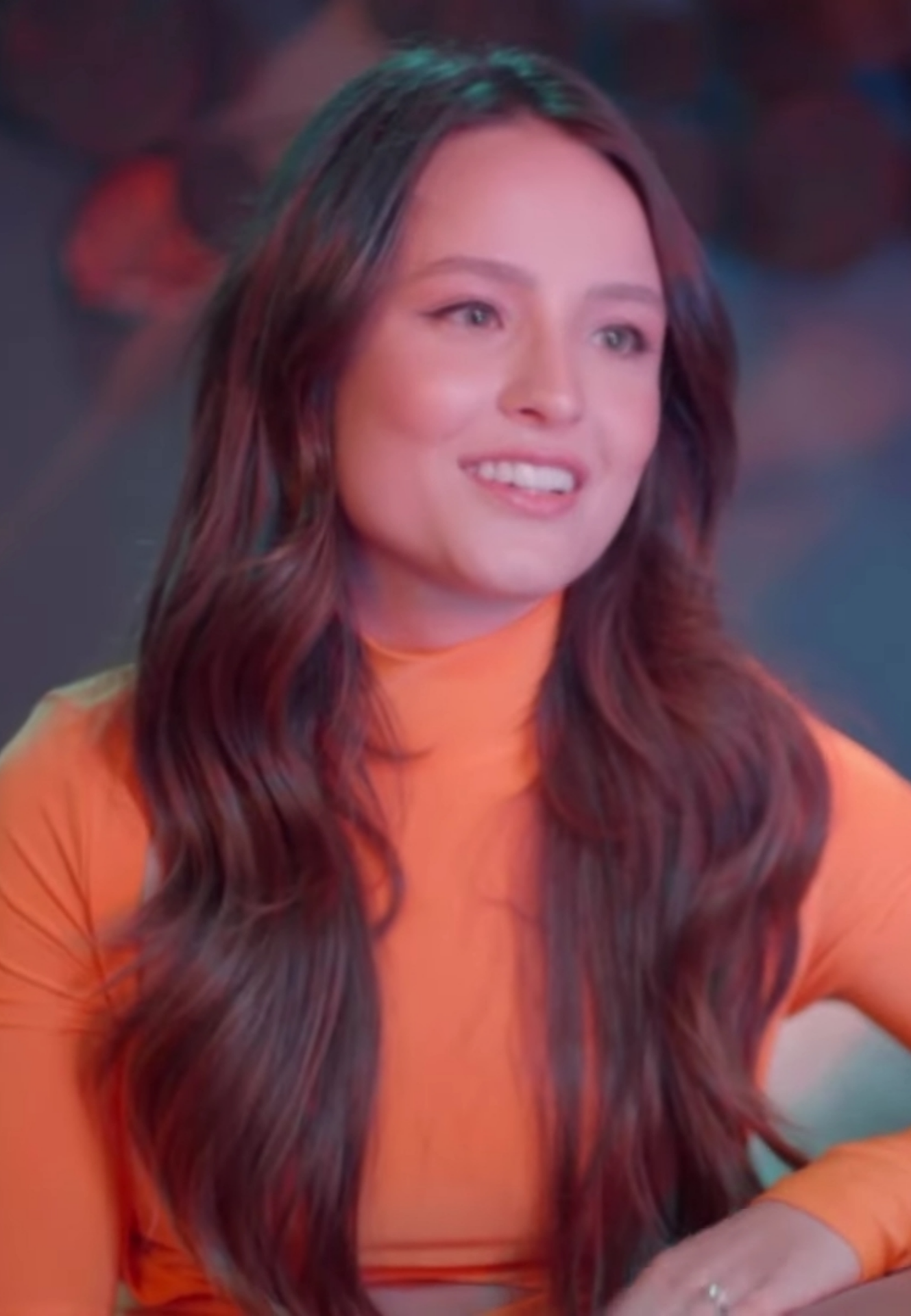
- Manoela in 2023
- Born: Larissa Manoela Taques Elias Santos; 28 December 2000 (age 25); Guarapuava, Paraná, Brazil
- Occupations: Actress; singer; writer; business woman; voice actress; model
- Years active: 2005-present
- Height: 1.53 m (5 ft 0 in)
- Spouse: André Frambach (m. 2023)
- Musical career
- Genre: Pop
- Instrument: Vocals
- Years active: 2012–present
- Label: Deckdisc

Signature
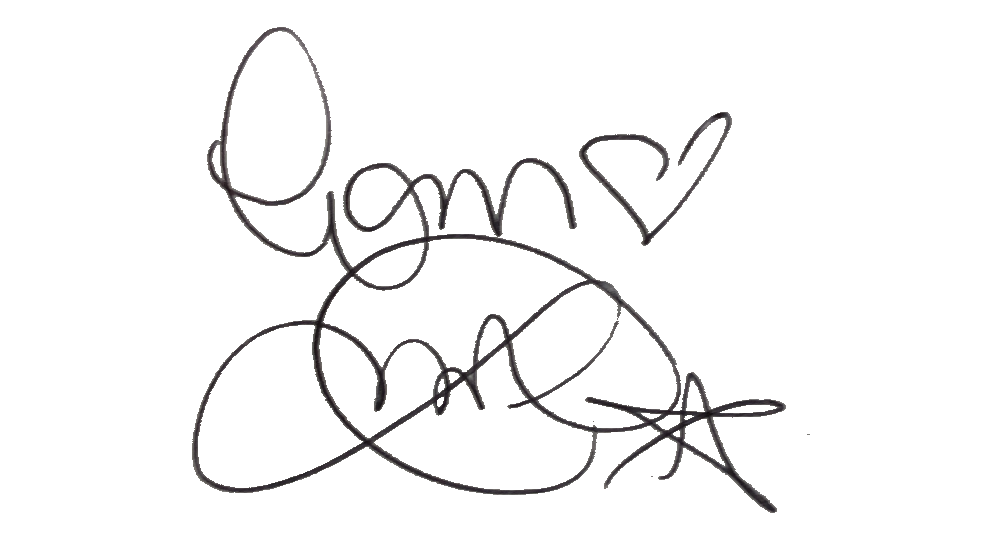

Larissa Manoela Elias Frambach (Portuguese: [laˈɾisɐ mɐnuˈɛlɐ]; born Larissa Manoela Taques Elias Santos; 28 December 2000) is a Brazilian actress and singer. One of the most famous children's and teen audiovisual celebrities, she has built a successful career in television, film and streaming since childhood, and she had more than 50 million followers online.

She is best known for playing Maria Joaquina in Carrossel, the twins Isabela and Manuela in Cúmplices de um Resgate and Mirela in As Aventuras de Poliana, SBT. In 2022, she made her debut on TV Globo in the telenovela Além da Ilusão, where she played Elisa and Isadora, two sisters at different stages.

== Early life ==
Larissa Manoela was born in Guarapuava, in the state of Paraná. She is the only daughter of Silvana Taques, an educator, and Gilberto Elias Santos, a real estate consultant. Her mother has Italian ancestry, from Veneto, and her father Portuguese ancestry, from Porto.

== Career ==
Larissa Manoela started her career at four, when a talent scout found her in a supermarket in the city of Guarapuava, Paraná. She started shooting as a model after she was scouted by Projeto Passarela.

At six years of age, after acting in some commercials, her first television work as an actress was on the GNT channel on the series, Mothern.

In 2010, Manoela starred as the protagonist of the series Songs of Betrayal, however, she came to recognition as an actress in 2012 when she played Viviane in the telenovela Corações Feridos and Maria Joaquina in the children's telenovela Carrossel.

In 2013, she starred in the series Patrulha Salvadora, and the following year, she appeared in the soap opera Cúmplices de um Resgate, starring as the twin sisters Isabela and Manuela.

In 2016, she released her first book, The Diary of Larissa Manoela. The book was released on 6 June at a Saraiva bookstore in a shopping mall in São Paulo. In 2017 she renewed her contract with the TV station SBT to be the character Mirela in the telenovela As Aventuras de Poliana, where she stars alongside João Guilherme Ávila. In 2017, Larissa released her second book, called The World of Larissa Manoela. In the same year, she released her first film as a main character and bought a mansion in Orlando, Florida.

As a singer, Manoela has already done a show in the US and has done many in Brazil. On 1 December 2017, Manoela released her first live studio album called Up! Tour.

In 2020, she debuted in her first film on Netflix, called Airplane Mode, where she is a social media influencer.

== Filmography ==
=== Television ===
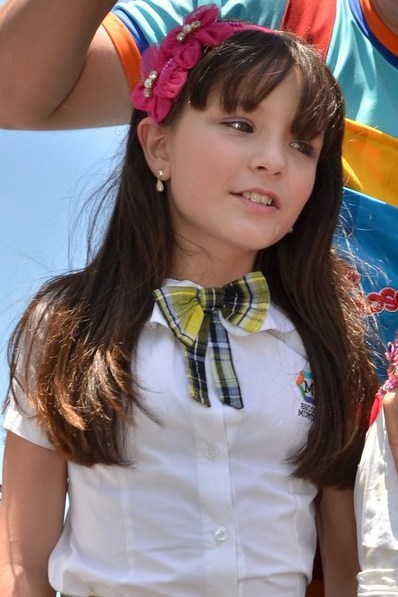
Manoela as Maria Joaquina in Carrossel, 2012

Year	Title	Role	Notes
2006	Mothern	Larissa	Guest Star
2010	Songs of Betrayal	Child Dalva de Oliveira	Guest Star
2010	Na Fama e Na Lama	Lequinha	Guest Star
2012	Corações Feridos	Viviane "Vivi" Roma	Co-protagonist
2012–2013	Carrossel	Maria Joaquina Medsen	Main Role
2013	Carrossel Especial	Maria Joaquina Medsen	Main Role
2014–2015	Patrulha Salvadora	Maria Joaquina Medsen	Main Role
2015–2016	Cúmplices de um Resgate	Isabela Junqueira & Manuela Agnes	Main Role
2017	TVZ	Special Presenter (Herself)	Guest Star
2017	Entubados	Juror (Herself)	Guest Star
2017	Bake Off SBT	Contestant (Herself)	Evicted on 2nd Stage
2018–2020	As Aventuras de Poliana	Mirella Delfino	Main Cast
2020	Dra. Darci	Poliana	Guest Star
2022	Além da Ilusão	Elisa Camargo Tapajós & Isadora Camargo Tapajós	Lead role
2024	Back to 15	Filipa Vieira	Season 3
2025–2026	Êta Mundo Melhor!	Estela	Main Role

=== Film ===
Year	Title	Role	Notes
2011	O Palhaço	Guilhermina	
2012	Essa Maldita Vontade de ser Pássaro	Pedrita	
2015	Carrossel: O Filme	Maria Joaquina Medsen	Main Role
2016	Carrossel 2: O Sumiço de Maria Joaquina	Maria Joaquina Medsen	Main Role
2017	Meus 15 Anos	Beatriz "Bia" de Souza	Main Role
2017	Fala Sério, Mãe!	Maria de Lourdes "Malu" Siqueira	Main Role
2020	Airplane Mode	Ana Monteiro	Main Role
2021	Diaries of an Exchange Student	Bárbara da Silva Neves	Main Role
2021	Lulli	Lulli Flores	Main Role
2023	Tá Escrito	Alice Bueno	Main Role
2025	Traição Entre Amigas	Penélope	Main Role

=== Dubbing ===
Year	Title	Voice
2012	Sítio do Picapau Amarelo	Narizinho
2015	The Little Prince	The Girl
2015	The Snow Queen 2	Gerda
2016	The Snow Queen 3: Fire and Ice	Gerda
2016	Carrossel em Desenho Animado	Maria Joaquina
2018	The Snow Queen: Mirrorlands	Gerda
2019	Charming	Lenore
2023	Nina e os Guardiões	Nina
2023	Trolls Band Together	Viva

=== Internet ===
Year	Title	Role	Notes
2018	Garota Errada	Herself	

== Literature ==
Year	Title
2016	O diário de Larissa Manoela: A vida, a história e os segredos da jovem estrela
2017	O Mundo de Larissa Manoela
2018	Perguntas e Respostas

== Stage ==
Year	Title	Role	Theater	City	Production	Ref.
2009	A Noviça Rebelde	Gretl	Teatro Alfa	São Paulo	Möeller & Botelho	
2010	Gypsy	Baby June	Teatro Alfa	São Paulo	Möeller & Botelho	
2011	As Bruxas de Eastwick	Little girl	Teatro Bradesco	São Paulo	Möeller & Botelho	
2018	A Noviça Rebelde	Liesl	Teatro Renault	São Paulo	Möeller & Botelho	
2018	A Noviça Rebelde	Liesl	Cidade das Artes	Rio de Janeiro	Möeller & Botelho	
2024	A Noviça Rebelde	Liesl	Teatro Riachuelo	Rio de Janeiro	Möeller & Botelho	
2024	A Noviça Rebelde	Liesl	Vibra São Paulo	São Paulo	Möeller & Botelho	

== Discography ==
- Com Você (2014)
- Além do Tempo (2019)
- Larissa Manoela A Milhão (2022)

== Tours ==
- Com Você Tour (2014)
- Up! Tour (2017–2018)
- Além do Tempo Tour (2019)

== Awards and nominations ==
Year	Award	Category	Nominations	Result
2012	Prêmio Extra de Televisão	Children's Revelation	Carrossel	Nominated
2013	Prêmio Contigo! de TV	Best Child Actress	Carrossel	Nominated
2013	Troféu Imprensa	Revelation of the Year	Carrossel	Nominated
2013	Troféu Internet	Revelation of the Year	Carrossel	Won
2013	Meus Prêmios Nick	Musical Revelation	Larissa Manoela	Nominated
2014	Troféu Internet	Best Soap Actress	Carrossel	Nominated
2014	Prêmio Quem de Televisão	TV revelation	Carrossel	Nominated
2014	Prêmio Contigo! de TV	Best Child Actress	Patrulha Salvadora	Nominated
2015	Top of Business	Homage	Larissa Manoela	Won
2015	Prêmio Extra de Televisão	Best Child Actor/Actress	Cúmplices de um Resgate	Nominated
2015	Prêmio Jovem Brasileiro	Best Actress	Cúmplices de um Resgate	Won
2016	Troféu Imprensa	Best Actress	Cúmplices de um Resgate	Nominated
2016	Troféu Internet	Best Actress	Cúmplices de um Resgate	Nominated
2016	Prêmio Jovem Brasileiro	Best Actress	Cúmplices de um Resgate	Won
2016	Prêmio Jovem Brasileiro	Young Person of the Year	Cúmplices de um Resgate	Nominated
2016	Capricho Awards	National Actress	Cúmplices de um Resgate	Won
2016	Capricho Awards	Fictional Shipper (Teobela)	Cúmplices de um Resgate	Won
2016	Capricho Awards	Real Couple (with João Guilherme)	Cúmplices de um Resgate	Won
2016	Prêmio Extra de Televisão	Best Child Actor/Actress	Cúmplices de um Resgate	Nominated
2016	Prêmio Quem de Televisão	Revelation	Cúmplices de um Resgate	Nominated
2017	Prêmio Jovem Brasileiro	Best Actress	Larissa Manoela	Won
2017	Prêmio Jovem Brasileiro	Best Singer	Larissa Manoela	Nominated
2017	Prêmio Jovem Brasileiro	Young Person of the Year	Larissa Manoela	Nominated
2017	Meus Prêmios Nick	Favorite Singer or Duo	Larissa Manoela	Nominated
2017	Meus Prêmios Nick	Favorite TV Artist	Larissa Manoela	Won
2017	Meus Prêmios Nick	Favorite Muser	Larissa Manoela	Nominated
2017	Meus Prêmios Nick	Gata Trendy	Larissa Manoela	Won
2017	Troféu Internet	Best Actress	Larissa Manoela	Nominated
2017	Troféu Imprensa	Best Actress	Larissa Manoela	Nominated
2017	Kids' Choice Awards	Favorite Brazilian Personality	Larissa Manoela	Nominated
2018	Prêmio Contigoǃ Online	Best Supporting Actress	As Aventuras de Poliana	Won
2018	Prêmio Jovem Brasileiro	Best Actress	As Aventuras de Poliana	Won
2018	Prêmio Jovem Brasileiro	Best Fandom	Larináticos	Nominated
2018	Prêmio Jovem Brasileiro	Best Singer	Larissa Manoela	Nominated
2018	Prêmio Jovem Brasileiro	Best Instagram	Larissa Manoela	Nominated
2018	Prêmio Jovem Brasileiro	Muser	Larissa Manoela	Nominated
2018	Prêmio Jovem Brasileiro	Young Person of the Year	Larissa Manoela	Nominated
2018	Meus Prêmios Nick	Favorite TV Artist	Larissa Manoela	Nominated
2018	Meus Prêmios Nick	Favorite Brazilian Instagram	Larissa Manoela	Won
2019	MTV Millennial Awards Brasil	Top of Lives	Larissa Manoela	Won
2019	Troféu Internet	Best Actress	As Aventuras de Poliana	Nominated
2019	Prêmio Jovem Brasileiro	Best Actress	As Aventuras de Poliana	Nominated
2019	Prêmio Jovem Brasileiro	I Shipp	Larissa e Leo Cidade	Nominated
2019	Prêmio Jovem Brasileiro	Best Fandom	Larináticos	Won
2019	Prêmio Jovem Brasileiro	Best Instagram	Larissa Manoela	Won
2019	Prêmio Jovem Brasileiro	Jovem do Ano	Larissa Manoela	Won
2019	Prêmio Jovem Brasileiro	Best Singer	Larissa Manoela	Nominated
2019	Prêmio Jovem Brasileiro	Hit of The Year	"Desencosta"	Nominated
2019	Meus Prêmios Nick	Melhor Apresentador	Larissa Manoela	Won
2019	Meus Prêmios Nick	Instagram do Ano	Larissa Manoela	Nominated
2019	Meus Prêmios Nick	Slime Épico	Larissa Manoela	Nominated
2020	Kids' Choice Awards	Fandom Brasileiro	Larináticos	Nominated
2020	Troféu Internet	Melhor Atriz	As Aventuras de Poliana	Nominated
2021	Prêmio iBest	TikToker do Ano	Larissa Manoela	Nominated
2021	Prêmio iBest	Influenciador do Ano Paraná (voto popular)	Larissa Manoela	Won
2021	Séries em Cena Awards	Influencer do Ano	Larissa Manoela	Nominated
2021	Prêmio Jovem Brasileiro	Melhor Atriz	Larissa Manoela	Nominated
2021	Prêmio Jovem Brasileiro	Rainha do Insta	Larissa Manoela	Nominated
2021	Prêmio Jovem Brasileiro	Meu Crush	Larissa Manoela	Nominated
2021	Prêmio Jovem Brasileiro	No Style	Larissa Manoela	Nominated
2021	MTV Millennial Awards	Ícone Miaw	Larissa Manoela	Nominated
2021	Prêmio Glow	Melhor Influencer do Ano	Larissa Manoela	Nominated
2021	Splash Awards	Melhor Atuação	Diários de Intercâmbio	Nominated
2021	TikTok Awards	Chegou brilhando	Perfil da atriz no TikTok	Nominated
2022	SEC Awards	Melhor Atriz Nacional em Filme	Lulli	Nominated
2022	SEC Awards	Destaque em TV	Além da Ilusão	Nominated
2022	Prêmio Jovem Brasileiro	Melhor Atriz	Além da Ilusão	Won
2022	Prêmio Jovem Brasileiro	Rainha do Insta	Larissa Manoela	Nominated
2022	Prêmio Jovem Brasileiro	Eu Shippo	Larissa e André Luiz Frambach	Nominated
2022	Prêmio Contigo!	Atriz de Novela	Além da Ilusão	Nominated
2022	e10blog Melhores do Ano	Melhor Atriz de Novela	Além da Ilusão	Won
2022	Prêmio Área VIP	Melhor Atriz	Além da Ilusão	Won
2022	Capricho Awards	Artista Nacional do Ano (Cinema e TV)	Além da Ilusão	Pending
2022	Capricho Awards	Casal do Ano	Larissa e André Luiz Frambach	Pending
2023	Prêmio iBest	Influenciador Protagonista	Além da Ilusão	Pending
