= Igor Jansen =

Brazilian actor (born 2004)

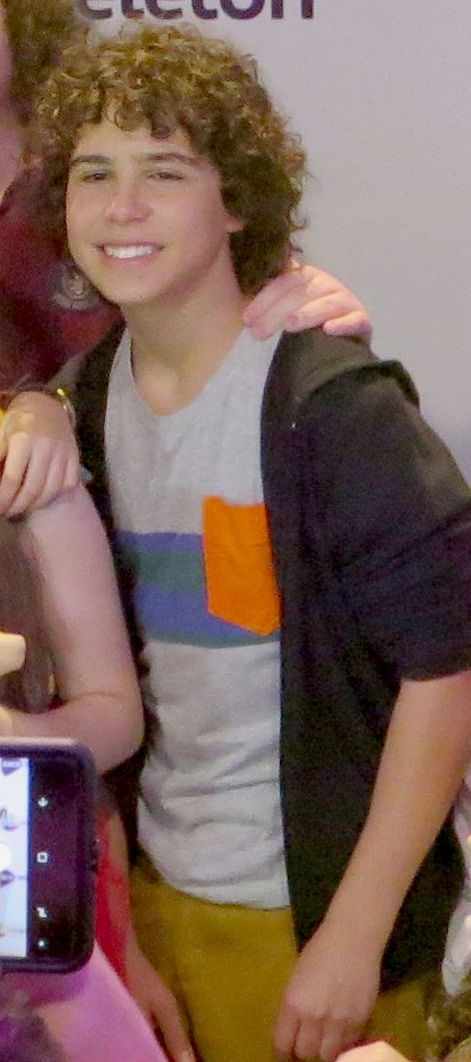
- Born: Igor Jansen Cavalcanti Diniz; 15 April 2004 (age 22); Fortaleza, Brazil
- Occupations: Actor; singer; voice actor
- Years active: 2016–present
- Notable work: João Barros da Silva in As Aventuras de Poliana, Poliana Moça and As Aventuras de Poliana – O Filme

Igor Jansen Cavalcanti Diniz (born April 15, 2004), better known as Igor Jansen, is a Brazilian actor, singer and voice actor. He became known for starring in the soap operas As Aventuras de Poliana and Poliana Moça in the role of João Barros da Silva.

== Career ==
Passionate about music, the actor dreamed of becoming a football player. As a child, he was part of Ceará's youth teams.

He debuted in theaters in 2016, playing the role of Piolho in the film O Shaolin do Sertão. His presence on television began in 2018, when he co-starred in As Aventuras de Poliana, as the character João Barros da Silva, becoming nationally known. Due to the great success of the plot, Jansen repeated the role in Poliana Moça and in the plot's telefilm.

In 2021, he was one of the participants in the Nickelodeon reality show Além do Filtro.

In theater, he played Bento in the play Natal Para Sempre. As a voice actor, he played the character Ron in The Snow Queen: Mirrorlands (in brazilian dubbing)

In 2023, he auditioned to play one of the central roles in the six o'clock soap opera No Rancho Fundo, which was subsequently approved, marking his debut on TV Globo the following year.

== Filmography ==
=== Television ===
Year	Title	Role	Notes
2018–2020	As Aventuras de Poliana	João Barros da Silva / Bento Goulart Vasconcelos	
2021	Além do Filtro Brasil	Participant	
2021	A Fantástica Máquina de Sonhos	João Barros da Silva / Bento Goulart Vasconcelos	
2022–2023	Poliana Moça	João Barros da Silva / Bento Goulart Vasconcelos	
2024	No Rancho Fundo	Aldenor Leonel	

=== Film ===
Year	Title	Role
2016	O Shaolin do Sertão	Piolho
2018	Cine Holliúdy 2: A Chibata Sideral	Seller
2023	As Aventuras de Poliana – O Filme	João Barros da Silva / Bento Goulart Vasconcelos
2023	O Primeiro Natal do Mundo	Arthur

=== Dubbing ===
Year	Title	Role
2018	The Snow Queen: Mirrorlands	Rony

=== Stage ===
Year	Title	Role	Notes
2018	Natal Para Sempre	Bento	
2022	13 – O Musical	Evan Goldman	

== Publications ==
Year	Title	References
2022	O Diário Secreto de Igor Jansen: Bastidores do Sucesso da Estrela Teen da TV	
