= Sophia Valverde =

Brazilian film actress (born 2005)

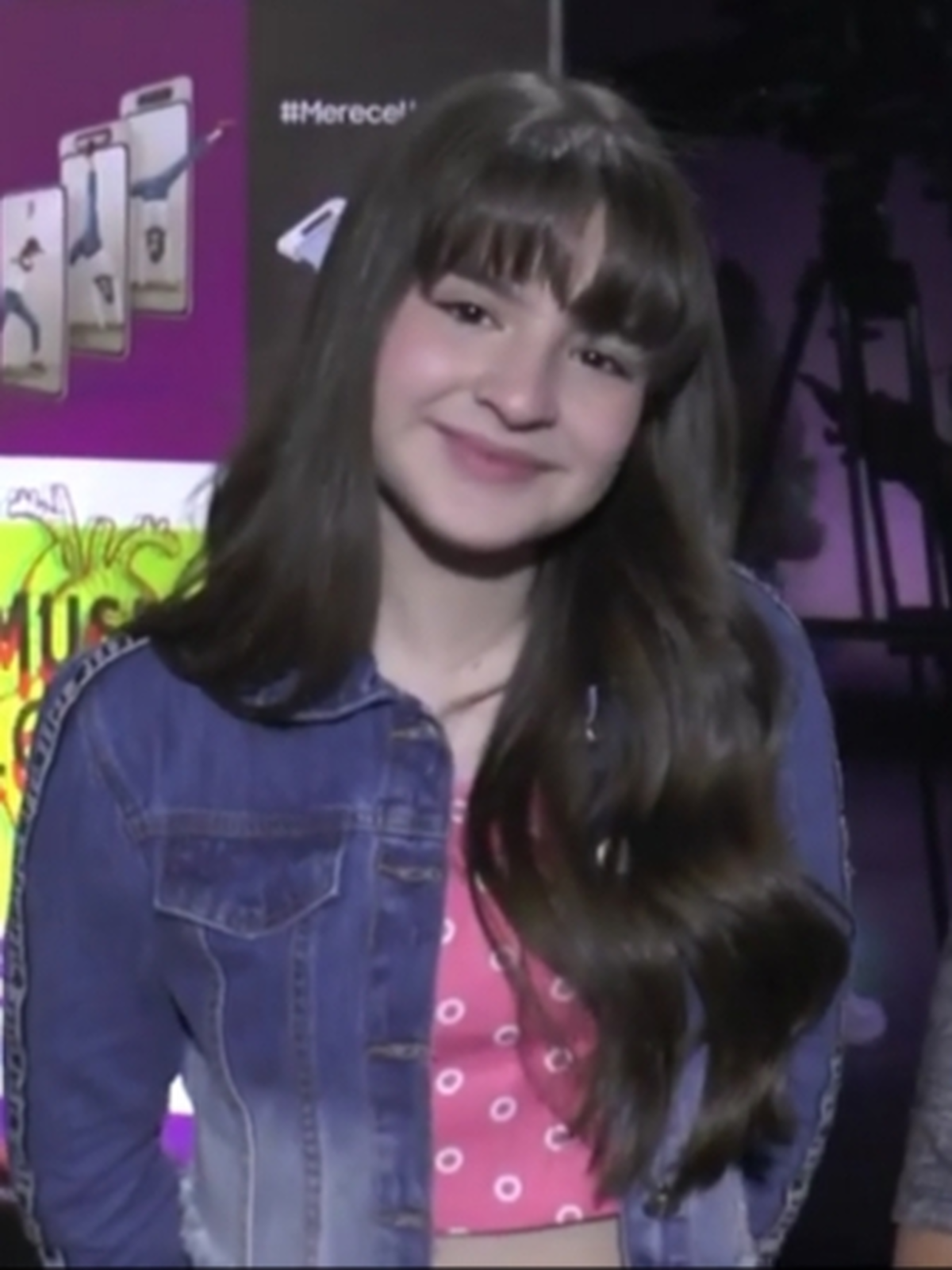
- Valverde in 2019
- Born: Sophia de Moraes Valverde; 30 August 2005 (age 20); Paraná, Brazil
- Occupation: Actress
- Years active: 2013–present

Sophia de Moraes Valverde (born 30 August 2005), known professionally as Sophia Valverde, is a Brazilian actress. She became known for playing the character Maria in Chiquititas (2013) and the character Doris in Cúmplices de um Resgate (2015). From 2018 to 2023, she was the protagonist Poliana in As Aventuras de Poliana and its sequel, Poliana Moça.

== Biography and career ==
She debuted on television in 2013, as Maria, in the second version of the children's soap opera Chiquititas, on SBT, a character that was played by Carla Diaz in the first version of the soap opera, in 1997. Sophia had already worked, since she was five, with advertising for several brands.

In 2017, the actress was cast in the telenovela As Aventuras de Poliana, by Íris Abravanel, who replaces Carinha de Anjo. The choice was announced on 4 July 2017.

== Filmography ==
=== Television ===
Year	Title	Role	Notes
2013–2015	Chiquititas	Maria Souza Almeida Campos	
2015–2016	Cúmplices de um Resgate	Dóris Jardim	Episodes: 111–357
2018–2020	As Aventuras de Poliana	Poliana D'Ávila Monteiro Pessoa	
2022–2023	Poliana Moça	Poliana D'Ávila Monteiro Pessoa	

Film

Year	Title	Role
2017	Just Like Our Parents	Nara Fabri Vasconcellos
2020	A Garota Invisível	Ariana
2022	Hora de Brilhar	Ariana
2023	As Aventuras de Poliana - O Filme	Poliana D'Ávila Monteiro
2024	Turma da Mônica Jovem: Reflexos do Medo	Mônica Sousa
2025	Missão Porto Seguro	Sílvia Quintella

== Stage ==
Period	Title	Role
2016–2017	O que terá acontecido com Baby Jane?	Baby Jane

== Discography ==
=== Singles ===
Year	Song	Album
2018	"Gigante"	Gigante
2018	"1, 2, 3"	Gigante
2018	"Vida de Aprendiz"	Gigante
2018	"Pela Primeira Vez"	Gigante
2018	"Amizade que Chama"	Gigante
2019	"Não é Sempre Mal"	Not added to any album

=== Extended plays (EPs) ===
Album	Details
Gigante	Launch: 27 de agosto de 2018; Format(s): digital download · streaming; Label: Independent

=== Soundtrack ===
Year	Song	Album
2018	"O Meu Nome é Poliana"	As Aventuras de Poliana
2018	"Jogo do Contente"	As Aventuras de Poliana

== Awards and nominations ==
Year	Award	Nominated work	Category	Result
2018	Prêmio Contigo! Online	As Aventuras de Poliana	Best Child Artist	Won
2018	Prêmio F5	As Aventuras de Poliana	Best Child Artist	Won
2018	Prêmio Extra de Televisão	As Aventuras de Poliana	Best Child Actor/Actress	Nominated
2019	Troféu Internet	As Aventuras de Poliana	Best actress	Won
2019	Troféu Imprensa	As Aventuras de Poliana	Best Actress	Nominated
2019	Prêmio Jovem Brasileiro	As Aventuras de Poliana	Best Actress	Nominated
2019	Meus Prêmios Nick	As Aventuras de Poliana	Female TV Artist	Nominated
2019	Prêmio Influency Me	As Aventuras de Poliana	Kids	Won
2019	Prêmio Contigo! Online	As Aventuras de Poliana	Best Child Actor/Actress	Won
2020	Kids' Choice Awards	Sophia Valverde	Favorite Brazilian Artist	Nominated
2020	Troféu Internet	As Aventuras de Poliana	Best actress	Nominated
2021	Prêmio Jovem Brasileiro	As Aventuras de Poliana	Best actress	Nominated
2022	SEC Awards	Poliana Moça	Best Actress in a Teen Series	Nominated
2022	Prêmio Jovem Brasileiro	Poliana Moça	Best Actress	Nominated
2022	Prêmio Área VIP	Poliana Moça	Best Teen Talent	Nominated
2023	Troféu Internet	Poliana Moça	Best Actress in a Novel	Nominated
2023	Prêmio iBest	Poliana Moça	Influencer Protagonist	Nominated
