= List of Brazilian films of 2000 =

A list of films produced in Brazil in 2000 (see 2000 in film):

== 2000 ==
Title	Director	Cast	Genre	Notes
Aldeia				
Almas em Chamas				
Amanhã				
Amélia	Ana Carolina	Marília Pêra, Béatrice Agenin, Camilla Amado, Pedro Bismark, Alice Borges, Marcélia Cartaxo	Comedy drama	
Amor Índio				
Anésia - Um Vôo no Tempo				
Através da Janela				
Bossa Nova	Bruno Barreto	Amy Irving, Antônio Fagundes	Romantic comedy	
Brainstorm	Laís Bodanzky	Rodrigo Santoro, Othon Bastos, Cássia Kiss	Drama	
Brave New Land	Lúcia Murat	Diogo Infante, Floriano Peixoto, Luciana Rigueira, Leonardo Villar	Drama	
Carrego Comigo			Documentary	
O Circo das Qualidades Humanas	Milton Alencar, Paulo Augusto Gomes, Geraldo Veloso, Jorge Moreno	Daniel de Oliveira, Eduardo Largo, Thaís Garayp, Francisco Milani, Jonas Bloch, Paula Burlamaqui, Stênio Garcia	Drama	
De Cara Limpa			Comedy	
A Dog's Will	Guel Arraes	Matheus Nachtergaele, Selton Mello	Drama, comedy, romance	Six wins and two nominations at various events
Eu Não Conhecia Tururu	Florinda Bolkan	Maria Zilda Bethlem, Florinda Bolkan	Drama	
Me You Them	Andrucha Waddington	Regina Casé, Lima Duarte	Comedy	Shown at the Karlovy Vary International Film Festival and at Cannes
Oriundi	Ricardo Bravo	Anthony Quinn	Drama	
Turbulence	Ruy Guerra	Jorge Perugorría	Drama	Entered into the 2000 Cannes Film Festival
Villa-Lobos: A Life of Passion	Zelito Viana	Antônio Fagundes, Marcos Palmeira, Letícia Spiller		Entered into the 22nd Moscow International Film Festival
Vingança Macabra			Horror, short	
Xuxa Popstar		Xuxa		

== See also ==
- 2000 in Brazil
- 2000 in Brazilian television
