= The Curse of the Cages =

- Directed by: Paula Fabiana; Adrian Steinway
- Written by: Paula Fabiana; Adrian Steinway
- Starring: Larissa Manoela; Cynthia Falabella; Adrian Steinway; Leopoldo Pacheco; Elias Andreato
- Release date: 2012
- Country: Brazil
- Language: Portuguese

The Curse of the Cages (Portuguese: Essa Maldita Vontade de ser Pássaro) is a Brazilian film released in 2012, directed by Paula Fabiana and Adrian Steinway.

== Cast ==
- Cynthia Falabella - Clara
- Adrian Steinway - Michel
- Elias Andreato - Soledad
- Leopoldo Pacheco - Marcelo
- Lorenzo Martin - Rafael
- Martha Nowill - Luísa
- Rodrigo Nogueira - Ivan
- Sweetie - Amanda
- Clarisse Abujamra - Mãe de Clara
- Antônio Januzelli - Alberto
- Luciana Vendramini
- Larissa Manoela
- Matheus Braga
