= Além da Ilusão =

Brazilian soap opera

- Genre: Telenovela
- Created by: Alessandra Poggi
- Written by: Adriana Chevalier; Letícia Mey; Flávio Marinho; Rita Lemgruber
- Directed by: Luís Felipe Sá; Luiz Henrique Rios
- Starring: Larissa Manoela; Rafael Vitti; Malu Galli; Marcello Novaes; Paloma Duarte; Bárbara Paz; Danilo Mesquita; Eriberto Leão
- Theme music composer: Alcyr Pires Vermelho; Walfrido Silva
- Opening theme: "O Tic-Tac do Meu Coração" by Gaby Amarantos
- Country of origin: Brazil
- Original language: Portuguese
- No. of seasons: 1
- No. of episodes: 167

Production
- Producer: Mauricio Quaresma
- Editor: Flávio Zettel
- Camera setup: Multi-camera
- Production company: Estúdios Globo

Original release
- Network: TV Globo
- Release: 7 February – 19 August 2022

Além da Ilusão (English title: A Trick of Fate) is a Brazilian telenovela produced and broadcast by TV Globo. It is written by Alessandra Poggi, with the collaboration of Adriana Chevalier, Letícia Mey, Flávio Marinho, Rita Lemgruber. It aired from 7 February 2022 to 19 August 2022. It stars Larissa Manoela, Rafael Vitti, Danilo Mesquita, Antônio Calloni, Malu Galli, Marcello Novaes, Bárbara Paz, and Paloma Duarte.

The telenovela is divided into two phases, the first set in Poços de Caldas, Minas Gerais in 1934 and the second in Campos dos Goytacazes, Rio de Janeiro in 1944. It follows the wealthy sisters Elisa and Isadora who, each in a different phase, fall in love with the magician Davi. The sisters are both played by Larissa Manoela.

== Plot ==
In Poços de Caldas in 1934, Elisa, the naïve daughter of the wealthy couple Matias and Violeta, falls in love with Davi, a young magician. Matias does not approve of their relationship, and Elisa ends up dying when her father tries to kill Davi but the bullet hits her instead. Davi is framed for this crime and sentenced to a 20-year prison term.

In 1944, ten years afterwards, the family lives in Campos dos Goytacazes. Matias has become psychologically unstable and cannot remember the past, while Violeta co-owns the weaving factory Tecelagem Tropical with the widowed Eugênio, with whom she starts to live a forbidden romance envied by the ambitious Úrsula, who has always been rejected by Eugênio and is capable of anything to get rid of Violeta. Matias and Violeta's younger daughter Isadora, who is now eighteen and physically similar to Elisa, dates Úrsula's arrogant son Joaquim, who is manipulated by his mother into marrying Isadora in order to inherit the family's fortune.

Meanwhile, Davi manages to escape prison and boards the luggage wagon of a train. After the train derails and crashes, he manages to steal the documents of Rafael, an almost fatal victim of the accident who gets into a coma. He then goes to the family's farm in Campos dos Goytacazes, where he begins to impersonate Rafael in order to conceal his real identity and eventually prove his innocence. The only person in the house who knows the truth about Davi is the maid Augusta, who believes in his innocence and often helps and advises him.

Davi's plans are hindered when he and Isadora fall in love with each other, leaving him to confront not only Joaquim, Úrsula and Matias, but also the dilemma of telling Isadora who he really is or not.

Besides the main storyline, Além da Ilusão also shows secondary situations involving other characters, such as other members of the family and factory workers living in the village around the house.

== Cast ==
- Larissa Manoela as Elisa and Isadora Camargo Tapajós
  - Sofia Budke as Child Isadora
- Rafael Vitti as Davi
- Malu Galli as Violeta Camargo Tapajós
- Marcello Novaes as Eugênio Barbosa
- Paloma Duarte as Heloísa Camargo
  - Ana Clara Winter as Young Heloísa
- Bárbara Paz as Úrsula Alves
- Danilo Mesquita as Joaquim Alves
  - Thiago Voltolini as Young Joaquim
- Eriberto Leão as Leônidas
- Olívia Araujo as Augusta dos Santos
- Alexandra Richter as Júlia "Julinha" Figueiredo Andrade
- Jayme Matarazzo as Father Tenório
- Marcos Veras as Enrico
- Cláudio Jaborandy as Benê
- Carla Cristina Cardoso as Felicidade
- Guilherme Silva as Onofre
- Patricia Pinho as Fátima
- Roberta Gualda as Giovanna Martinelli
- Cláudio Gabriel as Cipriano
- Caroline Dallarosa as Arminda Figueiredo Andrade
- Larissa Nunes as Letícia
  - Maria Luiza Galhano as Young Letícia
- Débora Ozório as Olívia
  - Letícia Pedro as Young Olívia
- Guilherme Prates as Lorenzo
  - Vinícius Pieri as Young Lorenzo
- Andrea Dantas as Romana
- Mariah da Penha as Manuela dos Santos
- Marcello Scorel
- Luciano Quirino as Abílio
- Ricky Tavares as Inácio
- Jorge Lucas as Delegate Salvador
- Carol Romano as Mariana
- Patrick Sampaio as Artur
- Alex Brasil as Dr. Elias
- Thayla Luz
- Fabrício Belsoff as Rafael Antunes
- Luciana de Rezende as Iara
- Leandra Lopez as Lavínia
- Giulia Ayumi
- Gaby Amarantos as Emília
- Duda Brack as Iolanda Gauthier
- Matheus Dias as Bento
  - Pedro Guilherme Rodrigues as Child Bento
- Lima Duarte as Afonso Camargo
- Paulo Betti as Constantino Figueiredo
- Marisa Orth as Margot
- Antônio Calloni as Matias Tapajós
- Arlete Salles as Santa Figueiredo Andrade
- Emiliano Queiroz as Father Romeu
- Nicolas Parente as Jojo

== Production ==
Alessandra Poggi began developing the telenovela in 2018. The telenovela had the working titles O Reverso da Fortuna (The Reverse of Fortune) and O Preço da Ilusão (The Price of Illusion), and in late 2019 it was confirmed as an upcoming production for the 6pm timeslot. Filming began in September 2021 in Poços de Caldas, Minas Gerais. In November 2021, interior filming began at Estúdios Globo.

== Ratings ==
Season	Episodes	First aired		Last aired		Avg. viewers (points)
Season	Episodes	Date	Viewers (points)	Date	Viewers (points)	Avg. viewers (points)
1	167	7 February 2022	18.1	19 August 2022	24.2	19.1
