= João Guilherme Ávila =

João Guilherme
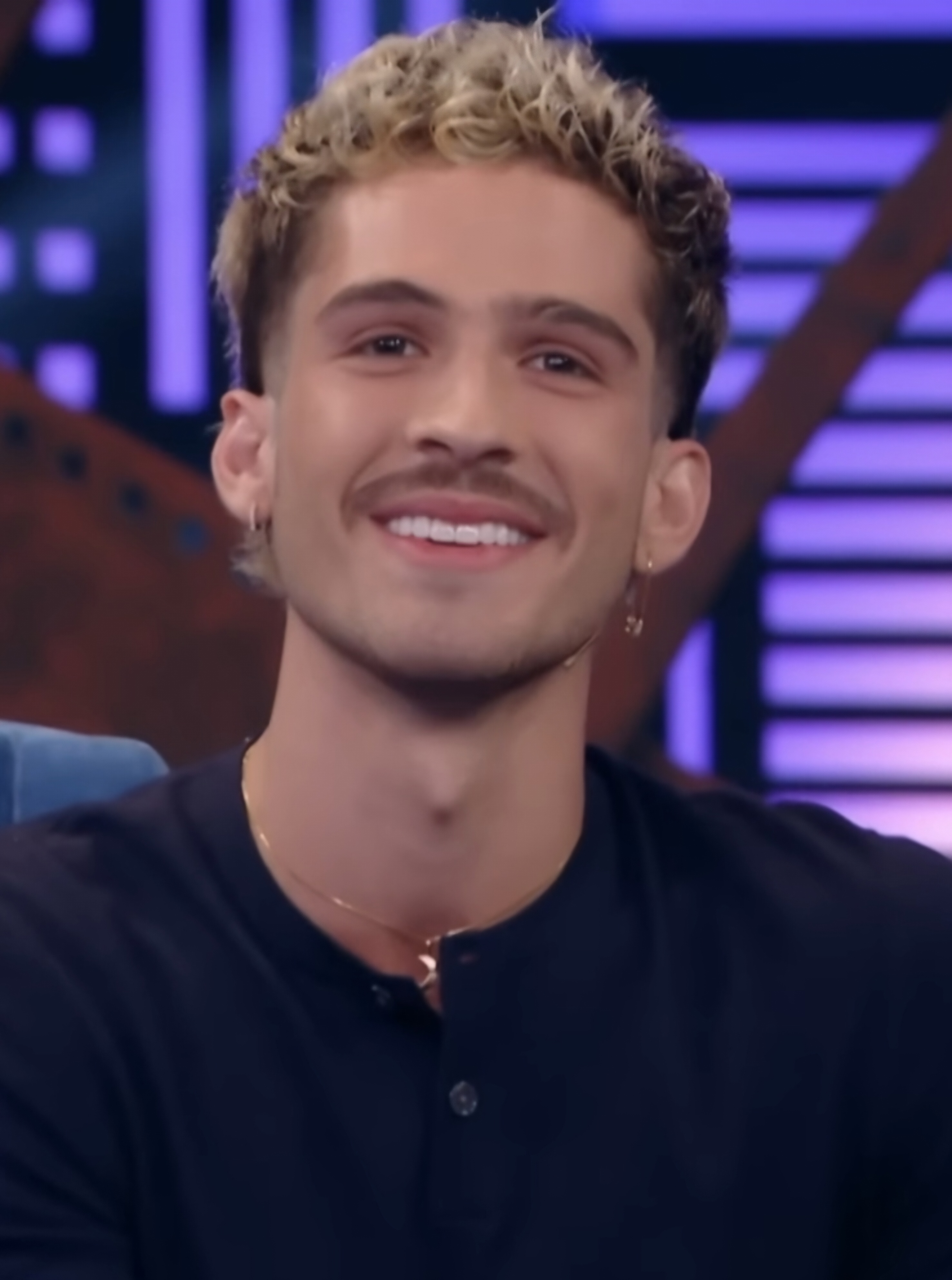
- Guilherme during an interview in 2024
- Born: João Guilherme de Ávila Costa; 1 February 2002 (age 24); São Paulo, São Paulo, Brazil
- Occupations: Actor; Singer
- Years active: 2009–present
- Father: Leonardo
- Relatives: Zé Felipe (half-brother); Pedro Leonardo (half-brother); Leandro (uncle)
- Musical career
- Genre: Pop
- Instrument: Vocals
- Years active: 2016–present

João Guilherme de Ávila Costa (São Paulo, February 1, 2002) is a Brazilian actor and singer. He rose to national fame for playing Joaquim, one of the protagonists in the children's telenovela remake Cúmplices de um Resgate, and later Luca Tuber in As Aventuras de Poliana.

== Career ==
João Guilherme began his acting career in 2009 at the age of seven, playing Vinícius in the short film Vento, alongside Vivianne Pasmanter. In 2012, he starred in the film Meu Pé de Laranja Lima, portraying Zezé in an adaptation of the classic novel by José Mauro de Vasconcelos.

João Guilherme launched his music career while playing Joaquim in Cúmplices de um Resgate. In 2015, he released his first song, "Princesa", which, along with "Tudo É Você", was part of the telenovela's soundtrack.

In 2015, he appeared in the film Entrando uma Roubada. That same year, he gained prominence on television by debuting as Joaquim in Cúmplices de um Resgate.

In August 2016, he released his first album, Meu Caminho, featuring ten original tracks. With new songs, a full band, and a larger production, he launched the Mega Tour JG. That Christmas, he released a holiday music video titled "My Order".

In 2017, he released a new EP with four songs titled João Guilherme, Vol II. That same year, he voiced Rony in the third installment of the animated film franchise O Reino Gelado. Later in 2017, he played Nando in the film Fala Sério, Mãe!, an adaptation of Thalita Rebouças' novel.

In October 2018, he returned to cinema playing Slack in the film Tudo Por Um Popstar.

== Filmography ==
=== Television ===
| Year | Title | Role | Ref. |
|---|---|---|---|
| 2015–16 | Cúmplices de um Resgate | Joaquim Vaz | |
| 2018–20 | As Aventuras de Poliana | Luca Della Torre ("Luca Tuber") | |
| 2022–2024 | De Volta ao 15 | Fabrício Azevedo | |
| 2023–present | Vicky e a Musa | Nicolás Cardine ("Nico") | |

=== Film ===
| Year | Title | Role | Ref. |
|---|---|---|---|
| 2012 | Meu Pé de Laranja Lima | Zezé | |
| 2015 | Entrando uma Roubada | Jarbas | |
| 2017 | Fala Sério, Mãe! | Nando | |
| 2018 | Tudo Por Um Popstar | Slack Tom Thompson | |
| 2019 | FLOPS – Uma Comédia Musical | Hugo | |
| 2022 | Alice no Mundo da Internet | Atualoncio da Silva ("Gato") | |

== Awards and nominations ==
| Year | Award | Category | Work | Result | Ref. |
|---|---|---|---|---|---|
| 2016 | Capricho Awards | National Actor | Cúmplices de um Resgate | Won | |
| 2016 | Extra TV Awards | Best Child Actor/Actress | Cúmplices de um Resgate | Nominated | |
| 2016 | Prêmio Jovem Brasileiro | Best Actor | Cúmplices de um Resgate | Won | |
| 2016 | Capricho Awards | Real Couple (with Larissa Manoela) | Himself | Won | |
| 2017 | Prêmio Jovem Brasileiro | Best Actor | Himself | Nominated | |
| 2017 | Prêmio Jovem Brasileiro | Best Singer | Himself | Nominated | |
| 2017 | Meus Prêmios Nick | Fashion Cat | Himself | Nominated | |
| 2018 | Prêmio Jovem Brasileiro | YouTuber of the Year | Himself | | Nominated |
| 2018 | Prêmio Jovem Brasileiro | Youth of the Year | Himself | | Nominated |
| 2018 | Prêmio Jovem Brasileiro | Best Fandom | Joaguinátic | | Nominated |
| 2018 | Prêmio Jovem Brasileiro | Best Actor | As Aventuras de Poliana | | Nominated |
| 2018 | Prêmio Contigo! Online | Best Supporting Actor | As Aventuras de Poliana | Won | |
| 2018 | Meus Prêmios Nick | Fashion Cat | Himself | Nominated | |
| 2019 | Nickelodeon Kids' Choice Awards | Favorite Brazilian Influencer | Himself | Nominated | |
| 2019 | MTV Millennial Awards Brazil | Top of the Lives | Himself | Nominated | |
| 2019 | Prêmio Jovem Brasileiro | My Platonic Love | Himself | Won | |
| 2019 | Prêmio Jovem Brasileiro | Youth of the Year | Himself | Nominated | |
| 2019 | Prêmio Jovem Brasileiro | Best Actor | As Aventuras de Poliana | Nominated | |
| 2019 | Meus Prêmios Nick | Male TV Artist | As Aventuras de Poliana | Won | |
| 2020 | Kids' Choice Awards | Favorite Brazilian Artist | Himself | Nominated | |
| 2020 | Kids' Choice Awards | Brazilian Fandom | Joaoguinantica | Nominated | |
| 2022 | SEC Awards | Best Actor in a Teen Series | Back to 15 | Pending | |
| 2022 | MTV Millennial Awards | Come to Me | Himself | Nominated | |
| 2022 | MTV Millennial Awards | Miau Fashion | Himself | Nominated | |
| 2022 | Prêmio Jovem Brasileiro | Best Actor | Himself | Pending | |
| 2022 | Prêmio Jovem Brasileiro | My Lifetime Love | Himself | Pending | |
| 2022 | Prêmio Jovem Brasileiro | Brazil's Most Stylish Youth | Himself | Pending | |
