= The Invisible Collection =

2012 film directed by Bernard Attal

- Directed by: Bernard Attal
- Written by: Bernard Attal; Sérgio Machado; Iziane Mascarenhas
- Produced by: Diana Gurgel
- Starring: Vladimir Brichta; Walmor Chagas; Ludmila Rosa
- Cinematography: Matheus Rocha
- Edited by: Karen Harley
- Music by: Silvain Vanot, Tiê, Fabio
- Production company: Santa Luzia Filmes
- Distributed by: Pandora Filmes
- Release dates: October 2, 2012 (Festival do Rio); September 6, 2013
- Running time: 89 minutes
- Country: Brazil
- Language: Portuguese
- Budget: $1 million

The Invisible Collection (Portuguese: A Coleção Invisível) is a 2012 Brazilian drama film, directed by Bernard Attal and starring Vladimir Brichta, Walmor Chagas and Ludmila Rosa. The film is based on the 1925 short story of the same title by Stefan Zweig. It was shot in Salvador and Itajuípe, Bahia.

== Plot ==
Beto's family owns a traditional antique store that is going through a financial crisis. To try to solve the situation, he travels to the town of Itajuípe, Bahia, in search of a rare collection of engravings which was acquired 30 years ago by a former client, the collector Samir. However, shortly upon arriving Beto faces strong resistance from his wife and his daughter Saada.

== Cast ==
- Vladimir Brichta as Beto
- Walmor Chagas as Samir
- Ludmila Rosa as Saada
- Clarisse Abujamra as Dona Clara
- Wesley Macedo as Wesley
- Frank Menezes as Nemias
- Conceicão Senna as Dona Iolanda
- Paulo César Pereio as Radio Host

== Festivals and awards ==
- Gramado Film Festival: Audience award for Best Film, Best Supporting Actor (Walmor Chagas), Best Supporting Actress (Clarisse Abujamra)
- Bogota International Film Festival: Best Feature Film (ex aequo with Florbela)
- Fest-In Lisboa: Best Feature Film
- Chicago International Film Festival
- International Film Festival of Mannheim-Heidelberg
- Rio International Film Festival
- Mostra Internacional de São Paulo
- Havana Film Festival
- Films By the Sea

== See also ==
- Stefan Zweig
