= Anjos do Arrabalde =

1987 film directed by Carlos Reichenbach

- Directed by: Carlos Reichenbach
- Written by: Carlos Reichenbach
- Produced by: Antonio Polo Galante
- Starring: Betty Faria; Clarisse Abujamra; Irene Stefânia
- Cinematography: Conrado Sanchez
- Edited by: Eder Mazzini
- Music by: Luiz Chagas; Manoel Paiva
- Distributed by: Embrafilme
- Release date: 19 February 1987
- Running time: 120 minutes
- Country: Brazil
- Language: Portuguese

Anjos do Arrabalde (English: Angels of the Outskirts) is a 1987 Brazilian drama film directed by Carlos Reichenbach.

The film won several awards at the 1987 Gramado Film Festival, including award for best actress for Betty Faria, (co-won with Zezé Motta on Night Angels) and best film.

In November 2015, Anjos do Arrabalde was selected by the Brazilian Association of Film Critics (Abraccine) as one of the 100 best Brazilian films of all time.

== Cast ==
- Betty Faria as Dália
- Clarisse Abujamra as Rosa
- Irene Stefânia as Carmo
- Vanessa Alves as Aninha
- Ênio Gonçalves as Henrique
- Emílio Di Biasi as Carmona
- Ricardo Blat as Afonso
- Carlos Koppa
- José de Abreu as Soares
- Nicole Puzzi
- Lygia Reichenbach
