= Lulli (film) =

- Directed by: César Rodrigues
- Written by: Marcelo Andrade; Renato Fagundes; Thalita Rebouças
- Starring: Larissa Manoela; Vinícius Redd; Amanda de Godoi
- Music by: Patrícia Portaro; Tolga Kahraman
- Production company: A Fábrica
- Release date: 26 December 2021
- Running time: 90 minutes
- Country: Brazil
- Language: Portuguese

Lulli is a 2021 Brazilian comedy-drama film directed by César Rodrigues, written by Renato Fagundes and Thalita Rebouças and starring Larissa Manoela.

== Plot ==
Lulli is an ambitious medical student whose greatest dream is to become the best surgeon, the goal failed when she is electrocuted by an electromagnetic resonance device that awakens her ability to hear other people's thoughts about Lulli.

== Cast ==
- Larissa Manoela as Lulli Flores
- Vinícius Redd as Diego Andrade
- Amanda de Godoi as Vanessa
- Yara Charry as Elena
- Sergio Malheiros as Julio
- Nicolas Ahnert as Ricardo
- SobuJ Ahmed as Porto
- Luciana Braga as Miriam Flores
- Paula Possani as Dr. Paola
- Guilherme Fontes as Dr. César Andrade
- Marcos Breda as Oscar
- Thalita Rebouças as Romina
- Ana Mangueth as Dolores
- Gabriel Contente as Roberto
