= Bruna Hamú =

Brazilian actress and former model (born 1990)

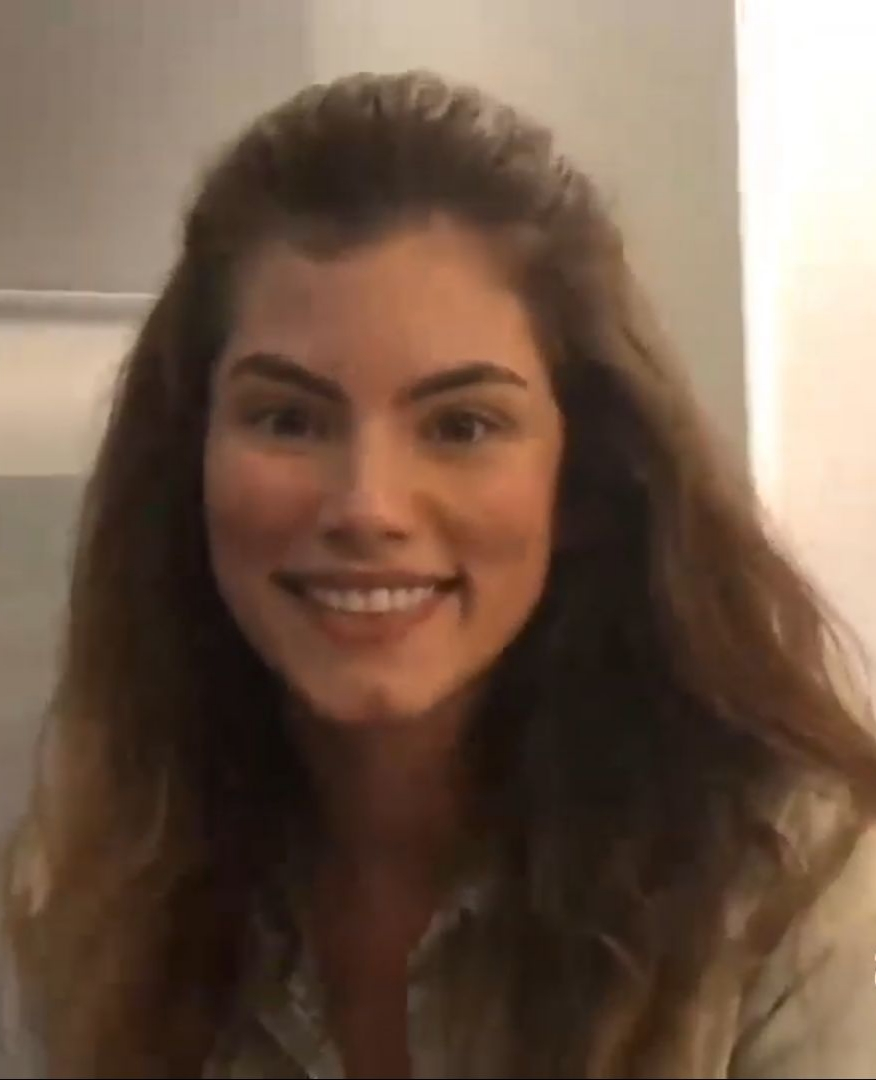
- Bruna Hamú in 2019
- Born: Bruna Ribeiro Hamú; 10 August 1990 (age 34); Brasília, DF, Brazil
- Occupation: Actress
- Years active: 2013–present
- Height: 1.72 m (5 ft 7 1/2 in)
- Spouse(s): Diego Moregola (2018-2019), Leonardo Feltrim (m. 2022)
- Children: 2

Bruna Ribeiro Hamú (born 10 August 1990) is a Brazilian actress and former model.

== Career ==
Hamú's first role was in the 20th season of Malhação. Before Malhação, she made a cameo in Sangue Bom. In 2016, Hamú joined the cast of A Lei do Amor, in which she played the valley girl Camila Costa Leitão.

== Personal life ==
Hamu has been in a relationship with businessman Diego B. Moregola since 2015. They have one son, Julio, born in 2016. She choose to step down from acting during the pregnancy and after in order to be a stay at home mom, after discussing it with her future husband. Hamu and Moregola were married on July 29, 2018. They were divorced 18 months later on 19 December 2019. After the divorce she resumed her work and said she regretted such decision.

== Filmography ==
Film
Year	Film	Role	Notes
2016	O Shaolin do Sertão	Anésia Shirley	
2020	Estação Rock	Suzana Aquino	

Television
Year	Title	Role	Notes
2013	Sangue Bom	Karolina "Karol"	
2014–2015	Malhação	Bianca Duarte	Lead role (280 episodes)
2016–2017	A Lei do Amor	Camila Costa Leitão	
2019	A Dona do Pedaço	Joana	Episodes: "September 12–November 22"

== Awards and nominations ==
Year	Awards	Category	Nominated work	Result
2014	Prêmio F5	Year of the Cat	—	Nominated
2015	Troféu Internet	Revelation of the Year	Malhação	Nominated
2015	Prêmio Jovem Brasileiro	Best Young Actress	Malhação	Nominated
2016	Prêmio Jovem Brasileiro	Best Young Actress	Malhação	Nominated
