= Pietra Quintela =

American actress (born 2007)

- Born: September 24, 2007 (age 19); City of São Paulo, State of São Paulo, Brazil.
- Occupations: Actress, Model and Digital influencer
- Years active: 2009–present

Pietra Quintela (born September 24, 2007) is a Brazilian actress, model and digital influencer known for starring in the film Princesa Adormecida (2024) and she has participated in other films such as Os Exterminadores do Além Contra a Loira do Banheiro (2018), Alice no Mundo da Internet (2022), As Aventuras de Poliana – O Filme (2020), Empirion: Uma Aventura com Einstein (2023), as well as the television soap operas As Aventuras de Poliana (2018–2020) an adaptation of the Eleanor H. Porter's book Pollyanna and Poliana Moça (2022–2023) the adaptation of the book sequence Pollyanna Grows Up. She also acted in the play "O Finado Beta e os Irmãos Rubel" from 2021.

== Early life ==
Pietra was born on September 24, 2007. She has two older brothers and is the daughter of businesswoman Deborah Quintela and businessman and former member of the musical group Dominó, Marcos Quintela.

== Career ==
Pietra took part in her first fashion show in 2009 at the age of 2, but her professional artistic journey really began when she was 7 years old and walked the runway at São Paulo Fashion Weekend Kids in 2014.

She started her first acting at the age of 9 in the soap opera As Aventuras de Poliana (2018–2020) from the Brazilian television network SBT which premiered in 2018 but started recording earlier.

Also in 2018, she debuted her first work in a film, being the Brazilian horror and comedy film Os Exterminadores do Além Contra a Loira do Banheiro

In 2024, the film starring Pietra Quintela was released in theaters Princesa Adormecida, is currently available on streaming services like Netflix.
