= Clarisse Abujamra =

Brazilian actress

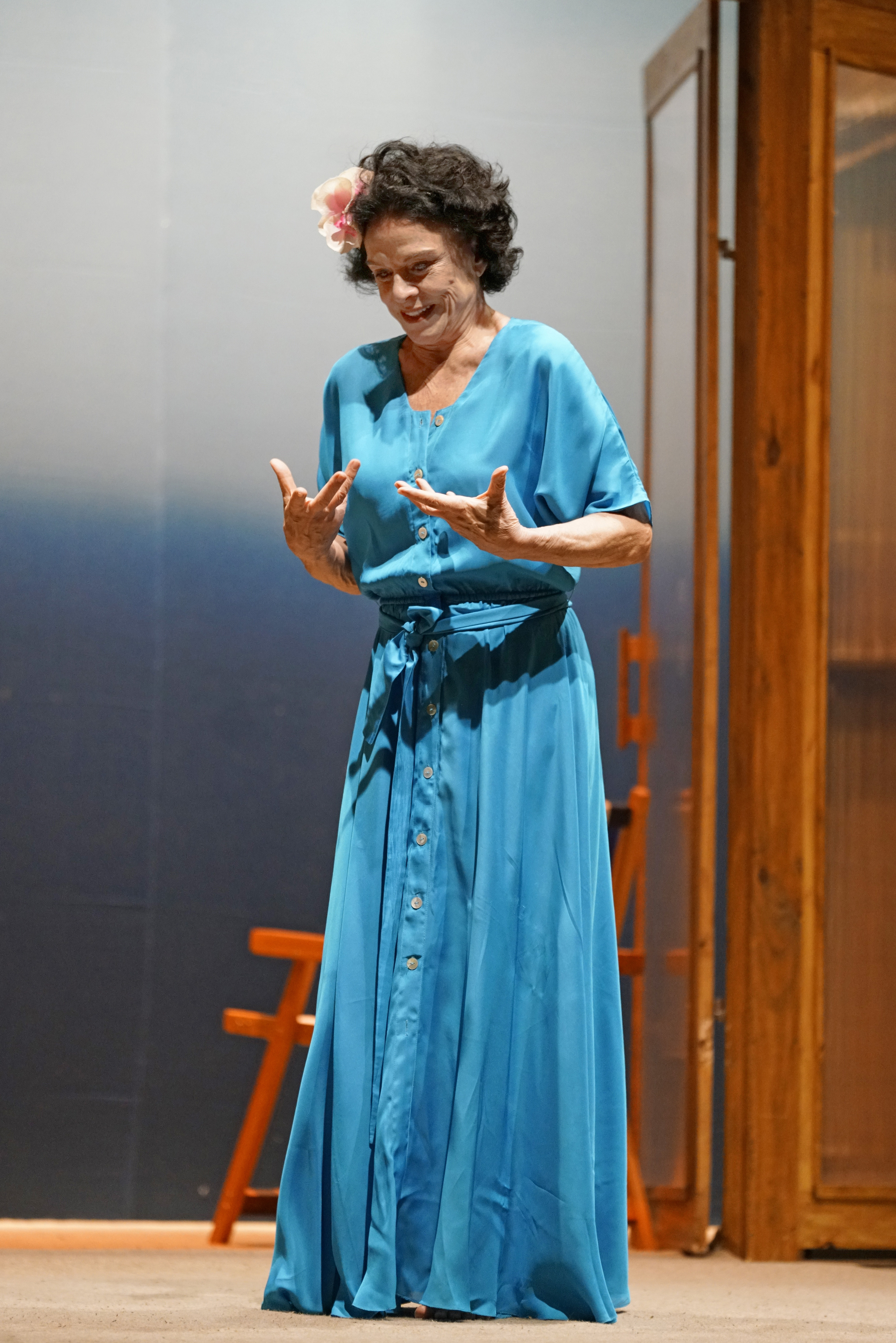
- Clarisse Abujamra (2024)
- Born: 3 April 1948 (age 78); São Paulo, Brazil
- Occupations: Actress, film producer
- Spouse: Antônio Fagundes (m. 1973; div. 1988)

Clarisse Mattos Abujamra (born 3 April 1948) is a Brazilian actress, choreographer, and theatre director. She is most known for her roles in Chega da Saudade (2007), A Coleção Invisível (2012), and Como Nossos Pais (2018).

Her uncle was actor Antônio Abujamra, and is André Abujamra's cousin. She was married to fellow actor Antônio Fagundes from 1973 to 1988, with whom she had three children: Dinah, Antônio and Diana.

== Filmography ==
=== Television ===
Year	Title	Character	Notes
2022	Poliana Moça	Glória Pessoa	
2021	Os Ausentes	Irmã Guiomar	Episode: "Ciro"
2018–20	As Aventuras de Poliana	Glória Pessoa	Season 1
2017	Treze Dias Longe do Sol	Raquel Krieg	Episode: "Pais e Filhos"
2017	Psi	Antonieta Dell Pizzo	2 episodes
2016-18	Carinha de Anjo	Antonieta	
2015	Os Experientes	Vera Lúcia	Episode: "O Primeiro Dia"
2015	Milagres de Jesus	Elisa	Episode: "Os Dois Ladrões"
2012	Fora de Controle	Letícia Espínola	1 episode
2010	Uma Rosa com Amor	Catarina	
2007	Dance Dance Dance	Leonor Marques	
2007	Maria Esperança	Rosa Canales	
2006	JK	Lucinda Romão	
2003	Jamais te Esquecerei	Alzira	
2001	Presença de Anita	Cecília	
1999	Chiquinha Gonzaga	Marina	

=== Film ===
Year	Title	Character
1968	As Amorosas	Colega de Ana
1980	Gaijin - Os Caminhos da Liberdade	Felícia
1987	Anjos do Arrabalde	Rosa
2008	Chega de Saudade	Rita
2011	Bruna Surfistinha	Celeste
2012	Essa Maldita Vontade de ser Pássaro	Mãe de Clara
2013	A Coleção Invisível	Clara
2013	Jogo das Decapitações	Marília
2013	A Memória que me Contam	Zezé
2014	Getúlio	Darcy Vargas
2014	Confia em Mim	Beatriz
2017	Como Nossos Pais	Clarice
2018	O Órfão	(curta-metragem)
2018	Contra a Parede	Testemunha
2020	Sergio	Gilda Vieira de Mello
2021	Meu Álbum de Amores	Rosa
2021	Achados Não Procurados	Dona Leonor
2022	Até a Noite Terminar	Senhora H

== Awards and accolades ==
Year	Award	Category	Work	Result	Reference
2009	Grande Prêmio do Cinema Brasileiro 2009	Best Supporting Actress	Chega de Saudade	Nominated	
2013	Kikito Award	Best Supporting Actress	A Coleção Invisível	Won	
2017	APCA Award	Best Actress in Film	Como Nossos Pais	Won	
2017	Kikito Award	Best Supporting Actress	Como Nossos Pais	Won	
2018	Grande Prêmio do Cinema Brasileiro 2018	Best Supporting Actress	Como Nossos Pais	Nominated	
2018	Prêmio Guarani de Cinema Brasileiro 2018	Best Supporting Actress	Como Nossos Pais	Won	
