= O Shaolin do Sertão =

- Directed by: Halder Gomes
- Screenplay by: L.G. Bayão
- Starring: Edmilson Filho; Fabio Goulart; Bruna Hamú; Dedé Santana; Marcos Veras; Igor Jansen; Fafy Siqueira; Falcão
- Distributed by: Globo Filmes
- Release date: 13 October 2016
- Language: Portuguese

O Shaolin do Sertão is 2016 Brazilian comedy film, directed by Halder Gomes and starring Edmilson Filho, Fábio Goulart and Bruna Hamú. The film won the Grande Prêmio do Cinema Brasileiro for Best Comedy Feature Film.

== Plot ==
The movie takes place in 1982. Professional vale-tudo fighters were struggling because of the lack of matches. So they decide to travel through several regions of Brazil to fight with altered and violent people from small countryside towns. And one of these, known as Toni Tora Pleura (Fábio Goulart), travels through the countryside of Ceará and in one of his winning fights, announces that he will arrive in the city of Quixadá, where the protagonist of the film lives, Aluísio Liduíno (Edmilson Filho), who likes to be called Aluísio Li.

Aluísio is fascinated by Chinese culture and especially by Kung fu films. Because of this, he behaves and dresses like a Shaolin, which makes him a laughing stock in his city. He works at Seu Zé's (Dedé Santana) bakery and is in love with his daughter, Anésia Shirley (Bruna Hamú) - even though she is engaged to Armandinho (Marcos Veras).

The candidate for mayor of Quixadá, Rossivaldo (Frank Menezes), using Toni Tora Pleura's challenge to win votes from the population and win the local election, summons opponents to face him. With the lack of volunteers, Aluísio Li appears, indicated by his friend Piolho (Igor Jansen) and he offers himself for the fight. Rossivaldo then gives Aluísio money to prepare for combat.

Piolho's cousin, Jesus (Haroldo Guimarães), informs Aluísio that in Quixeramobim, a city neighboring Quixadá, there is an alleged Kung fu master named Wilson (Falcão) and says he can train him for fighting. In this they both go to him and Aluísio asks to be trained in the Chinese martial art. Wilson refuses, but when Aluísio shows him the money, he changes his mind. Right after the training, Aluísio receives his Shaolin graduation from his master and at night he goes together with Piolho to a bar in the city and gets involved in a fight with some MMA fighters and winning. Aluísio then pays Master Wilson and returns to Quixadá. The victory in the fight at the Quixeramobim bar soon reaches the ears of the Quixada population and Aluísio is received as a celebrity by candidate Rossivaldo and his boss Seu Zé. That same night, Aluísio is woken up to solve a street fight and when he gets there, he is approached by Armandinho - jealous of the approach of Anésia and Aluísio - and the fighters he defeated in Quixeramobim's bar. The Shaolin gets punched and falls unconscious.

Piolho reveals to Aluísio that Master Wilson is a fake and that the fight in the bar was staged by him and the leader of the fighters - his relative - so that the Shaolin of the Sertão would win and then pay him the training money. He falls out of favor in Quixadá, being despised by everyone and indulging in drink. In a moment when he mixes fury and drunkenness, he destroys the Chinese artifacts in his room and finds a VCR tape containing a movie called "A Voadora do Dragão" and decides to watch it. However, as he was poor and didn't have a reproductive device in his house, he ended up remembering that he had one at Rossivaldo's house, when he was invited to a dinner party. He breaks into his house, takes the device but is discovered and arrested.

The day of the fight arrived and Quixadá had no fighter, due to Aluísio Li's arrest. Rossivaldo, fearing the cancellation of the fight and later his defeat in the elections, asks that Aluísio be released from the police station. In a long and difficult fight, Aluísio defeats Toni Tora Pleura and with the award received, he founded the Academia de Luta Irmãos Gêmeos de Parte de Pai (or Father's Part Twin Brothers Fight Academy) in Quixadá.

== Cast ==
- Edmilson Filho as Aluisio Li
- Bruna Hamú as Anésia Shirley
- Dedé Santana as Seu Zé
- Marcos Veras as Armandinho
- Igor Jansen as Piolho
- Fábio Goulart as Toni Tora Pleura
- Fafy Siqueira as Dona Zefa
- Falcão as Chinês
- Frank Menezes as Rossivaldo
- Cláudio Jaborandy as Regislândio Lúcio
- Haroldo Guimarães as Jesus
- Solange Teixeira as Margot
- Evenice Neta as Lorraine
- Luís Guilherme as Organizador do evento
- Karla Karenina as Marciclene
- Tirulipa as Juiz
- Li Lin - Daniel as Mestre Chinês
- Demick Lopes as Técnico de Toni Tora Pleura
- Eduardo Cintra as Luizão
- Yasmim Sant'Anna as Dona Zefa (Jovem)
- Yuri Yamamoto as Li Chai Chang
- Bráulio Bessa as Informante
- Lailtinho as Chico Esponja
- Camila Uckers as Barraqueira
- Edmir Kawakubo as Chefão Chinês
- João Inácio Jr. as Repórter de TV
- Kyra Gomes as Arengueira
- André Campos as Bichinha
- Fernanda Callou as Apresentadora de TV
- Bolachinha as Macaca Monga
- Diego Jovino as Arengueiro
- Reginauro Souza as Besouro do Cão
- Glayco Salles as Médico
- LC Galetto as Padre
- Adriano Uchôa as Assistante do Regislândio
- Dennys Lacerda as Euclides Claude
