= Cúmplices de um Resgate =

- Genre: Teen; telenovela; Drama; Comedy; Fantasy
- Created by: Rosy Ocampo
- Written by: Íris Abravanel
- Directed by: Reynaldo Boury
- Starring: Larissa Manoela; Juliana Baroni; Giovanna Chaves; João Guilherme Ávila; see more
- Opening theme: Cúmplices de um Resgate by Larissa Manoela
- Country of origin: Brazil
- Original language: Portuguese
- No. of episodes: 357 (282 International version)

Production
- Production location: CDT da Anhanguera - Osasco - Brazil
- Running time: 45 minutes
- Production companies: SBT; Televisa

Original release
- Network: SBT
- Release: August 3, 2015 – December 13, 2016

Related
- Chiquititas; Carinha de Anjo; Cómplices al rescate

Cúmplices de um Resgate (English. Accomplices of a Rescue) is a Brazilian teen telenovela created by Rosy Ocampo and written by Íris Abravanel, originally broadcast on SBT from August 2015 to December 2016. It is the Brazilian remake of the Mexican telenovela Cómplices al rescate produced by Televisa in 2002.

== Production ==
In August 2014, the call was initiated for the cast and testing began in September. Larissa Manoela, already starring Patrulha Salvadora at the time, was called to play the twin protagonists without need to do the tests. The cast was announced in January 2015, when there was an improvement workshop for the characters, and filming began on March 23. Some scenes and music videos were filmed in 4K resolution, technology hitherto unheard of in the SBT's dramaturgy.

Supposedly, Mexican sites said Gabriela Spanic and SBT were making an agreement so she could take a part in the telenovela, but the network has denied such things. In late June, an accident suffered by Larissa Manoela, who plays the protagonists pulled her away temporarily from filming and delayed the program's debut date. The actress fell from a horse in Atibaia during filming and had to stay a few weeks off.

On November 10, 2015, SBT announced the departure of actress Duda Wendling, who played Doris, because her mother didn't allow the renewal of her contract. Actress Sophia Valverde, who played Maria in Chiquititas, replaced her.

== Plot ==
Two twin sisters who were separated after birth are reunited after twelve years. Manuela (Larissa Manoela), one of the twins, is sweet, gentle, very talented for music and has a lovely voice. She lives a happy life in "Village of Dreams:, where she lives with her grandmother Nina (Mira Haar), her aunt Helena (Thays Gorga) and her mother Rebecca (Juliana Baroni), who loves and cares for her daughter as Manuela never met her father. Rebecca is the biological mother of two girls, but she never knew she had. Manuela is very beloved in the village, and is member of a band called "Manuela e Seus Amigos" (Manuela & Her Friends). Other members are her aunt Helena, Pedro (Elam Lima), Mateus (Lipe Volpato) and his younger sister Doris (Sophia Valverde) and Teo (Fhelipe Gomes), a blind yet smart boy. They are accompanied by Manteiguinha, Teo's guide dog and Mateus and Doris' mouse, Tuntum. The two animals "talk" to each other, following the children of the village.

Isabela (Larissa Manoela) was separated from Manuela at birth and lives a rich life, surrounded by employees and many perks, but she has no friends. She lives in conflict with her "mother" Regina (Maria Pinna), who had to steal her when she was born with the help of her brother Geraldo (Nando Pradho) since she can't have children of her own. Orlando (Alexandre Barros), Isabela's father, works hard but always has time for his daughter and makes all her wishes. Isabela is also beloved by Marina (Tânia Bondezan), her nanny and the housekeeper. She dreams of being a singer, but she has no such talent.

A children's group is about to be formed by the label "Do-Re-Music", where Isabela works with André (Felipe Cavalcanti) and the Vaz siblings: Joaquim (John William), Júlia (Bia Jordan) and Felipe (Kevin Vechiatto). Isabela does anything to get signed and Regina becomes her business agent, faking everything so that no one outside of the city ever finds out that Isabela exists, because it would be a huge problem to her if the girl becomes famous. Things change when Marina takes Isabela to a music competition where Manuela's band also participates. Isabela sees the resemblance between them both, then proposes a switch.

Everything goes wrong. Manuela, pretending to be Isabela, can not sing at the audition and Isabela, pretending to be Manuela, makes everyone suspicious. The two decide to switch places again. The test works, but Regina and Geraldo bring in another girl to take Isabela down and kick her out of the band. The girl is Priscila (Giovanna Chaves), Safira's daughter (Dani Moreno). Priscilla sings and the two fight to be the vocalist. Meanwhile, after examination, Orlando discovers he has a serious illness and will die.

Orlando has a heart attack and dies. Before dying, he reveals the secret code of the safe box to Isabela, arranges his will and leaves all his inheritance to her, but as Isa is a minor, the money is under Marina's protection, leaving Regina furious. After that, Geraldo watches a DVD of Manuela & Her Friends and realizes the similarity between the girls and then notices that Manuela was the one singing on Isabela's audition. He tells this to Regina, who is furious to learn that Manuela and Isabela have met. She and Geraldo decide to kidnap Manuela and send Isabela away so Manuela can usurp Isabela as place in the band and make money for Regina and Geraldo with her voice, since Orlando left nothing to Regina. Marina sees Isabela (pretending to be Manuela) in the village. So Isabela tells that they are twins and they actually switched places for Manuela to sing in her place. Regina tells Geraldo that Isabela can learn more than they want her to, so she tells a story to Isabela that Rebeca abandoned her and Regina saved her. Geraldo sends his henchmen to kidnap Manuela. Regina Isabela hostage at the back of the mansion, who manages to escape and ask for help to the Vaz siblings. They learn about the secret and help Isabela to rescue Manuela, while Rebecca is dedicated to find her missing daughter.

== Broadcast ==
The first chapter aired on August 3, 2015 at the 9 pm timeslot, after the final chapter of Chiquititas and before the Carrossel reprise. After the end of Chiquititas, the program started airing from 8:30 pm. On Saturday, August 15, at 22:30 pm, SBT aired a compact of the first 10 chapters.

The telenovela aired from Monday to Friday, with the indicative rating of "Livre para todos os públicos" (Free for all audiences). The author Iris Abravanel noted that the telenovela deals with more adult themes than previous programs, but the content is adapted to the indicative classification: "The program has a more adult cast and addresses issues a little more delicate than the previous plots, but we take care to maintain the lightness."

== Cast ==
=== Main cast ===
| Actor | Character |
|---|---|
| Larissa Manoela | Manuela Agnes Fará (Manu) / Isabela Saldanha Junqueira (Isa) |
| Juliana Baroni | Rebeca Agnes |
| Maria Pinna | Regina Saldanha Junqueira / Paola |
| Duda Nagle | Otávio Neto |
| Dani Moreno | Safira Meneses |
| Elam Lima | Pedro Cavichioli |
| Thays Gorga | Helena Agnes |
| Nando Pradho | Geraldo Saldanha |
| Gustavo Rodrigues | Arthur Torres |
| Thiago Amaral | Frederico "Pierre" Pereira (Fred) |
| Diego Montez | Tomas Gomes |
| João Camargo | Ofélio Batista |
| Augusto Garcia | Pastor Augusto |
| Edson Montenegro | Father Lutero |
| Giovanni Venturini | Nico Sardinha |
| Valéria Sandalo | Meire Borba Gato |
| Nina Morena | Flora Cruz |
| Rodrigo Dorado | Dinho Borba Gato |
| Thais Lago | Flávia |
| Cléo Ventura | Aurora Meneses |
| Jaime Leibovitch | Fortunato Meneses |
| Ronaldo Oliva | Raul Fernandes |
| Maurício Ribeiro | Fausto Ramos |
| Ohana Homem | Clara Jardim |
| Murilo Meola | Luiz Jardim |
| Camila dos Anjos | Alícia Alencar |
| Pedro Garcia Netto | Vicente Alencar |
| Marcelo Galdino | Joel Ferraz |
| Miguel Nader | Sandro Cavanhaque |
| Luciano Vianna | Navarro Peixeira |
| Carlos de Niggro | Vargas Houdini |
| Luiz Carlos Félix | Ermínio Pimenta |
| Renata Calmon | Lurdes "Lurdinha" Passos |
| Maria Eduarda Machado | Letícia Flores |
| Camila Demaman | Laura Antunes |
| Graça Berman | Nair Luz |
| Alexandre Barros | Orlando Junqueira |
| Nilton Bicudo | Damião da Fonseca |
| Tânia Bondezan | Marina Alves Lopes |
| Mira Haar | Nina Agnes |
| Vicentini Gomez | Giuseppe Cavichioli |
| Bárbara Bruno | Fiorina Cavichioli |
| Bia Jordão | Júlia Vaz |
| Bia Lanutti | Lola Alencar |
| Duda Wendling | Dóris Jardim |
| Sophia Valverde | Dóris Jardim |
| Fhelipe Gomes | Teófilo Cavichioli (Téo) |
| Gabriel Moura | Benjamin |
| Giovanna Chaves | Priscila Meneses (Pri) |
| Graciely Junqueira | Chloé |
| João Guilherme Ávila | Joaquim Vaz |
| Julia Simoura | Sabrina |
| Kevin Vechiatto | Felipe Vaz |
| Lipe Volpato | Mateus Jardim |
| Luckas Moura | Omar Ferraz |
| Mharessa | body double Isabela's and Manuela's / Fabiana |
| Vinicius Henuns | Xavier |
| Renato Cavalcanti | André Alencar |
| Ailton Rosa | Bira |
| Robson Kumode | Tuntum |
| Diego Lima | Manteiguinha |
| Herbert Richers Jr. | Bartolomeu |
| —N/a | Beijoca |
| Renata Calmon | Poodle |

=== Guest starring ===
| Actor/Actress | Character |
|---|---|
| Théo Salomão | Diogo (Sacolinha) |
| Grace Gianoukas | Benedita |
| Mharessa Fernanda | Fabiana |
| Vitoria Caroline dos Santos | Yasmim |
| Remo Rocha Neto | Dr. Vinicius |
| Sylvio Zilber | Dr. Otávio |
| Luciana Carnieli | Marta Lobo |
| Cainã Diniz | Juan Pedro Carvalho /Breno Pedro Carvalho |
| Patrícia Abravanel | Herself |
| Celso Portiolli | Himself |
| Rachel Sheherazade | Herself |
| Marcello Ramos | Sander |
| Stephanie D'Amico | Taísa |
| Maximiliana Reis | Berta |
| Gabriella Di Grecco | Gemima |

=== Gallery ===
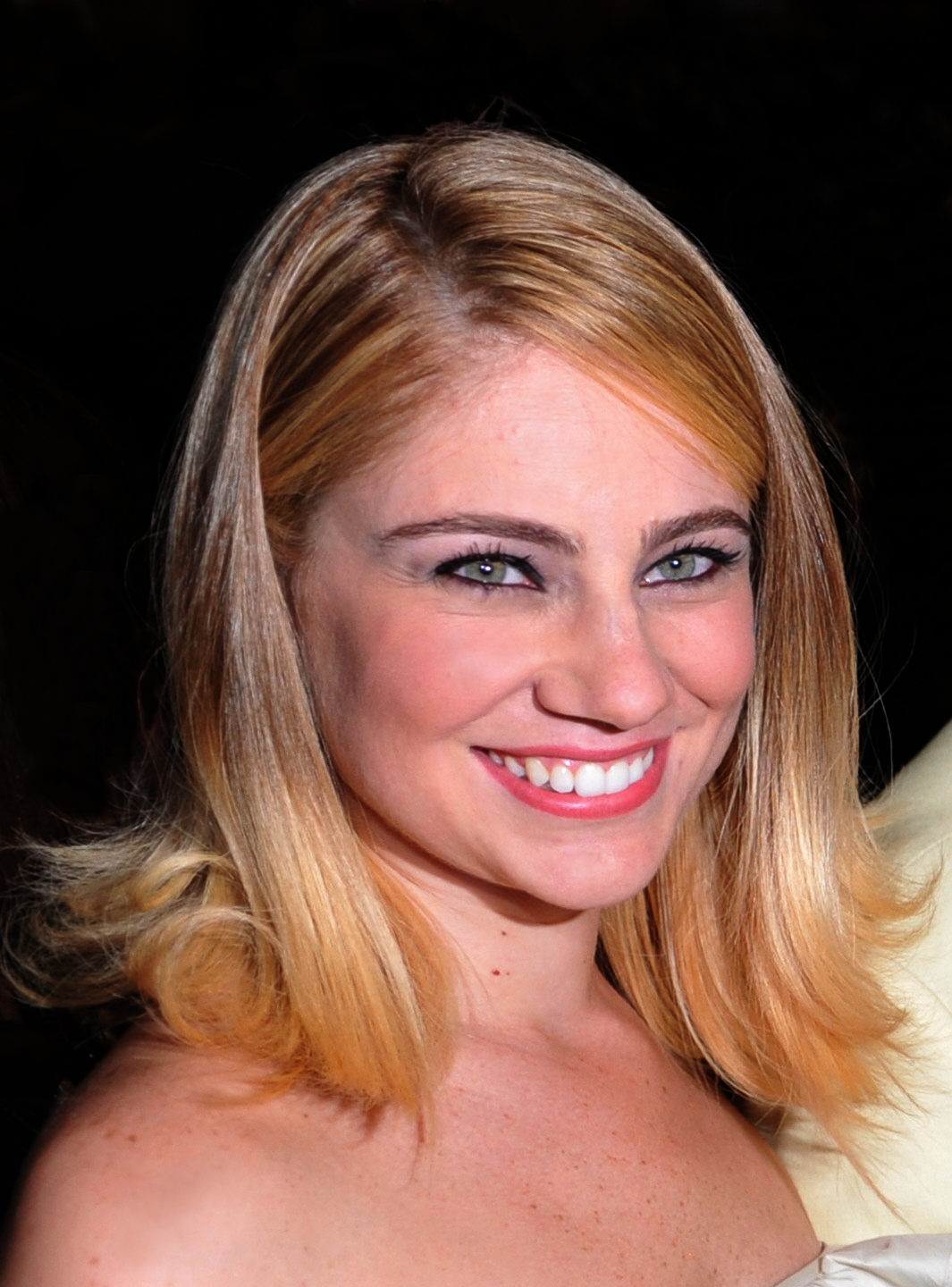
Juliana Baroni portrays Rebeca.

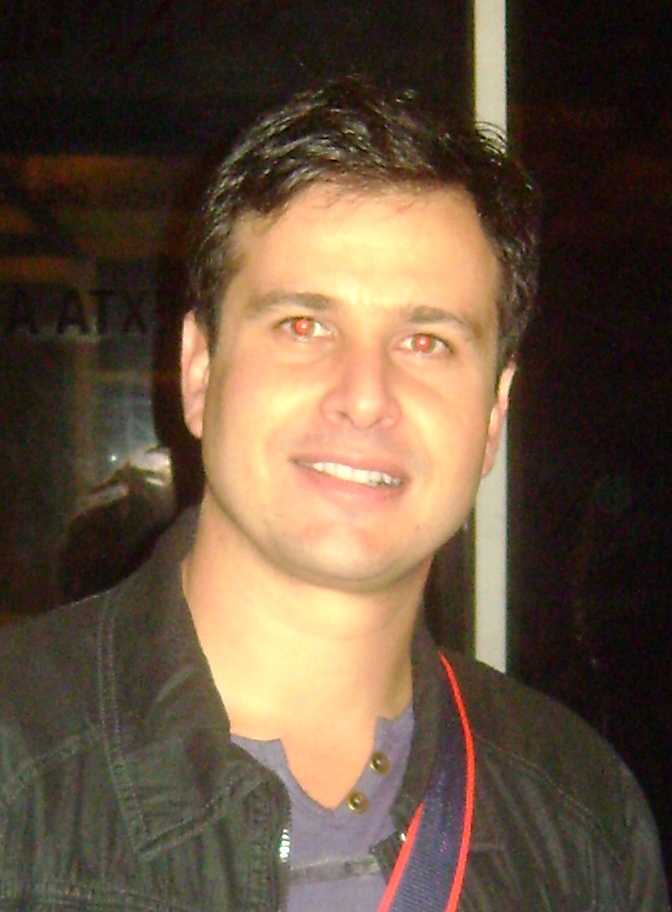
Pedro Garcia Netto portrays Vicente.

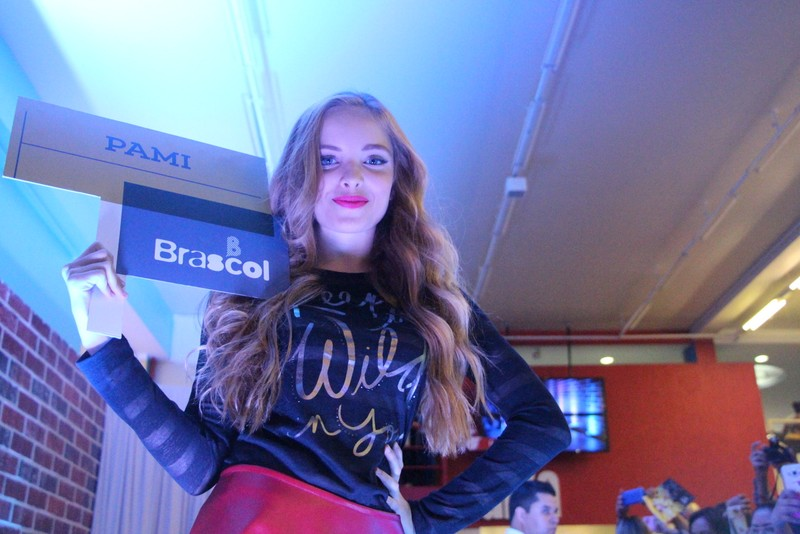
Giovanna Chaves portrays Priscila.

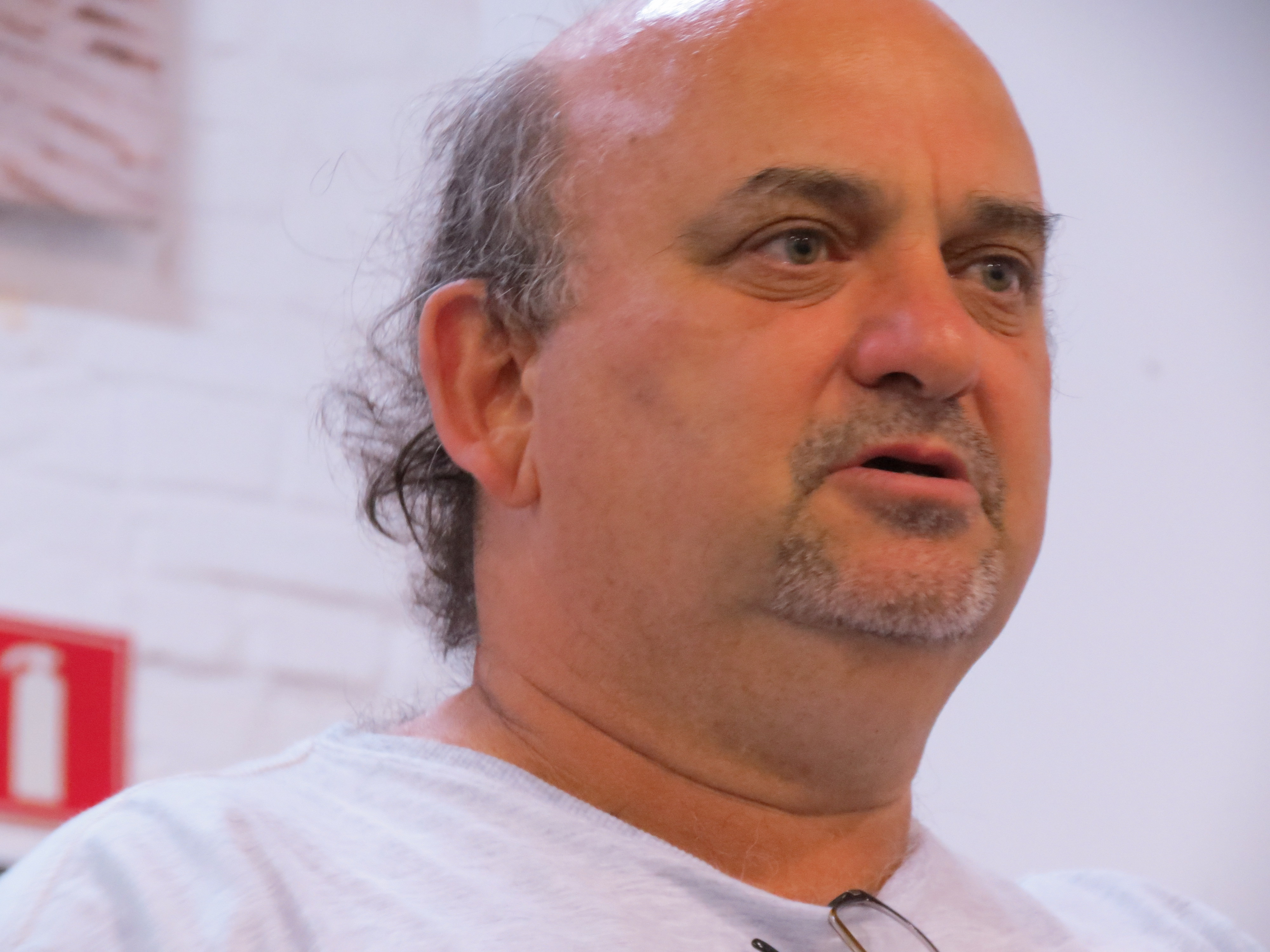
Vicentini Gomez portrays Giuseppe.

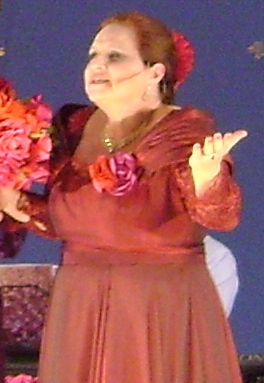
Mira Haar portrays Dona Nina.

== Awards and nominations ==
| Year | Award | Category | Nominated work | Result | Ref. |
|---|---|---|---|---|---|
| 2015 | Prêmio Extra de Televisão | Best Actress/Mirim Actress | Larissa Manoela | Nominated | |
| 2016 | Troféu Imprensa | Best Telenovela | Íris Abravanel | Nominated | |
| 2016 | Troféu Imprensa | Best actress | Larissa Manoela | Nominated | |
| 2016 | Troféu Internet | Best Telenovela | Íris Abravanel | Nominated | |
| 2016 | Troféu Internet | Best actress | Larissa Manoela | Nominated | |

== See also ==
- Cómplices al rescate - telenovela produced by Televisa in 2002
