= Mothern (TV series) =

- Genre: Comedy; Drama
- Created by: Luca Paiva Mello; Rodrigo Castilho
- Directed by: Luca Paiva Mello; Pedro Amorim; Paschoal Samorra; Luis Pinheiro
- Country of origin: Brazil
- Original language: Portuguese
- No. of seasons: 3
- No. of episodes: 39

Production
- Producer: Gil Ribeiro

Original release
- Network: GNT
- Release: 19 August 2006 – 2007

Mothern was a Brazilian comedy television series, created by Luca Paiva Mello and Rodrigo Castilho for the GNT channel.

== Plot ==
Beatriz, Mariana, Raquel and Luísa are young, professionals and mothers. On the verge of a nervous breakdown, they try to find balance in their lives and the best way to raise their children.

== Cast ==
- Camila Raffanti ... Raquel
- Fernanda D'Umbra ... Mariana
- Juliana Araripe ... Beatriz
- Melissa Vettore ... Luísa
- Alexandre Freitas ... Zé
- Otávio Martins ... Léo
- Rafinha Bastos ... Marcelo
- Miguel de Azevedo Marques ... Filipe
- Giovana Ramos and Giulia Ramos ... Nina
- Pedro Henrique Lemos ... Martim
- Pietra Pan ... Laura
- Enrico Damaro ... Pedro
- Klara Castanho ... Bel

== Awards ==
Year	Awards	Category	Result
2007	35th International Emmy Awards	Best Drama Series	Nominated
