= Miguel Ângelo =

Miguel Ângelo may refer to:

- Miguel Ângelo (singer), lead vocalist of Delfins
- Miguel Ângelo (futsal player) (born 1994), Portuguese futsal player
- Miguel Ângelo (footballer, born 1984), Portuguese footballer
- Miguel Ângelo (footballer, born 1995), Portuguese footballer
- Miguel Ângelo (footballer, born 1970), Portuguese footballer and coach
- Miguel Ângelo (politician) (born 1991), Brazilian politician
- Miguel Ângelo Faria (born 1995), Portuguese footballer
- Miguel Ângelo (actor) (born 2011), Brazilian actor
