= Mili Urién =

Milagros "Mili" Urien
- Chiquititas character
- Mili as a young woman, portrayed by Agustina Cherri in the seventh and final season of Chiquititas.
- Portrayed by: Agustina Cherri; Ixchel del Paso (Mexican version); Fernanda Souza (Brazilian version, as Milena Pereira); Giovanna Grigio (Brazilian 2013 remake)
- Duration: 1995-1997, 2001
- Created by: Cris Morena; Gustavo Barrios; Patricia Maldonado
In-universe information
- Parents: Gabriela Morán; Unknown father Gabriela Almeida Campos (Brazilian versions); Miguel Pereira (Argentine and Brazilian versions)
- Grandparents: Ramiro Morán; Valentina Pereira (Argentine and Brazilian versions)
- Aunts and uncles: Martín Morán; José Ricardo Almeida Campos Júnior (Brazilian versions)
- Other relatives: Carmen Morán (great-aunt); Carmem Almeida Campos (great-aunt, Brazilian version)

Milagros Urien, simply known as Mili, is a fictional character and the young protagonist of the Argentine telenovela Chiquititas, also known as Tiny Angels. The character was portrayed by actress Agustina Cherri from 1995 to 1997 on television and on stage. In 1998, Cherri won a Martín Fierro Award of Best Child Performance for her portrayal of the character In 2001, Cherri made a special return as Mili for the show's seventh and final season. Mili was portrayed by actress Fernanda Souza in the successful Brazilian adaptation of the story, Chiquititas Brasil, where the character is named Milena Pereira. Ixchel del Paso portrayed Mili in the short-lived Mexican version. Mili is portrayed by Giovanna Grigio in the 2013 Brazilian series Chiquititas.

In every version of the story, Mili is an orphan who lives with some other little girls in the orphanage known as Rincón de Luz (Raio de Luz in the Brazilian versions). The character shares a similarity with Sara Crewe from Frances Hodgson Burnett's novel A Little Princess as her fondness, friendliness and love for storytelling makes her popular with her fellow chiquititas. Mili is also decided to uncover the truth about her family and her unknown past. Her only clue, and closest memory of them is a small, golden brooch supposed left by her parents, with the word "Volveré" ("I will be back") inscribed, a promise in which Mili faithfully believes.

== Storyline ==
=== Years at the manor ===
Mili was the first orphan to join the Rincón de Luz institution, which received nine other girls over the course of the years. Every night before sleeping, she entertains them with stories and tales she creates. The girls are supervised by the rigorous janitor of the manor, Ernestina, and the adorable chef of the house, Saverio. The nine chiquititas are also frequently visited by Belén, Saverio's sweet-hearted and dedicated goddaughter. Emilia administrates the manor, which was founded by Ramiro Morán, an important entrepreneur. After things go wrong at the orphanages anniversary party, and Carmen Morán (Ramiro's authoritarian sister) has decided to fire Saverio, Mili is the one who convinces Ramiro to let Saverio stay. While visiting the Moráns' mansion, she meets Ramiro's younger son Martín, and his sister Gabriela. Gabriela supposedly lost her son and became mentally ill, which embittered Martín. Mili eases their situation by becoming Martín and Gabriela's young friend. Martín reciprocates by helping Mili in her search for her family, and Belén joins them. The orphans later receive a new intern, a tiny but aggressive girl named Jime. Jime had a difficult background and had lost her trust on people. She initially does not get along with her new family, and Mili later softens her conduct, becoming her newest, greatest best friend. Mili and Jime's friendship, as well as Jime's apparent change, comes into question after Cinthia, one of the girls, makes everyone suspect that Jime stole Mili's brooch.

Carmen's unscrupulous acts lead to Emilia's removal from the position as the house's admin. Mili insists to Martín to have the woman back, but she travels before things can be made clear. However, she's not replaced by Carmen, as Ramiro nominates his girlfriend Ginette on Emilia's place.

=== Adulthood ===
Mili returns to the manor as a young adult after her mother dies. She is shocked for discovering that the current orphans are deprived from their dreams and happiness, after an ambitious woman named Lidia takes over the house. She starts working on a nearby bar, where she falls in love for a handsome young man named Ramiro. Mili is decided to change the orphans' situation starting from the inside, following Belén's lessons. She joins the house as Greta, a supposedly rigorous janitor newly hired by Lidia. Mili then discovers Lidia's true plans for the children, as the woman intends to send the group back to the horrible child prison they had to escape years before, the Hogar de las Sombras. Mili reveals her true identity for them, but the orphans do not believe her. The only exception is Maria, who recognizes Mili from the Book of Life, which was written by Belén in the past. Lidia ties Mili and Ramiro in the Attic after discovering the truth and lies to the orphans about a tour promoted by her. The group then find out that the van actually belongs to the Hogar, and manage to escape. Mili and Ramiro also gets rid from the strings and Lidia is caught by the police. Lidia, however, reveals she had installed a time bomb inside the manor, since the house won't belong to her. The group desperately leaves the house and, after Agustín is left behind, Mili gets back to save him. As Lidia delights with her destruction, Mili states that nothing will destroy their home, as long as the chiquititas stand united. A light gleam appears in the sky and the group witness as Belén makes magically rebuilds the manor. Mili's fellow interns, who lived in the orphanage with her in the past (Such as Sol, Jime, Guille and Corcho) also appear among them. The ending of Chiquititas indicates that Mili, Ramiro and the orphans have started a definitive family altogether.

== Other versions ==
=== Chiquititas Brasil ===
Mili as portrayed by Fernanda Souza in Chiquititas Brasil.

Fernanda Souza portrays Mili in the Brazilian series. Her storyline is similar with the key difference that, in this version, Mili gets to known her father. He is Miguel, who is hidden inside the manor and seeks to know who his lost daughter is. After a disfiguring aerial accident, Miguel was forced to use a mask to hide the scars left on his face. Miguel went to live inside the manor and was unsure of which girl was his lost daughter. After he finds out that she is actually Mili, he kidnaps she and Carol, taking them to his airplane. Mili witness as Miguel falls from the airplane, without revealing the truth to anyone. With the help of Fernando (Carol's boyfriend and Miguel's friend from), Carol manages to land the airplane. While attempting to hide the truth from everyone, Carmem "hires" Marian, an ambitious and compulsive liar intern of the manor. Marian often targets Mili with her envy and causes her to become temporarily blind, making her life as difficult as possible. In one occasion, Marian makes Mili to be run over by a boy with his bike, Luca. Noticing they are falling for each other, Marian shatters their relationship and manages to take Luca from Mili. She also makes Gabriela do become fond for her, until Matilde, the house's former janitor who discovered the truth, returned and told Carol that Mili was actually Gabriela's daughter. Sometime before Christmas, Carol reunites the orphans and tells them the truth about Mili. Desperate, she remembers Miguel and her grandfather José Ricardo, both of them having tragic deaths. Carmem attempts to kidnap Mili but fails, and the girl is rescued by Luca, Mosca and her fellows, and Marian herself, after she redeems herself. Now aware of everything, Mili forgives Marian, stating that she would not ruin that happy moment of hers. At the Raio de Luz's Christmas party, Mili leaves Carol and her fellow orphans with Gabriela and Luca (Mili's boyfriend). Carol later recalls her by tenderly keeping a photograph of Mili.

=== 2013 version ===
Giovanna Grigio as Mili at the series' press conference. In this version, she tells a fairy tale to her fellows, unaware the story is her own background.

Giovanna Grigio portrays Mili in the Brazilian 2013 telenovela. Mili is considerably older than her fellow chiquititas in this version, and aspires to become a professional writer. Apart from her unknown origin, Mili's aging worries her and brings her adoption into question among herself and the others. Mili tells to the other girls the fairy tale of a princess who is separated from her lover, a commoner man, by her cold-hearted father, the King, who sends his daughter to a faraway land of cold, sadness and darkness. The Princess and the Commoner's love is symbolized by a white rose, which falls and grows nearby the manor of a witch. Later, six other flowers grow around the White Rose, and they become a family. Mili is unaware that she is telling her own story, which was modified and adapted by Sofia, their orphanage's fond admin. The Princess is actually Gabriela, Mili's mother who fell in deep depression and was left traumatized after her father José Ricardo Almeida Campos (the King) lied about the deaths of Miguel (the Commoner) and their newborn child. José Ricardo persuaded Sofia to hide the truth, and Sofia named the baby Milena, gave her a rose-shaped necklace in which is inscribed "Voltarei" ("Volveré"), and sent her to the manor which eventually became the Raio de Luz insituition, sheltering other six girls (the flowers). Sofia told Mili the tale and she repassed to the other chiquititas every night. Mili is often targeted by the envy of Bia and befriends and changes the aggressive newcomer Pata, a girl who is taken off the streets and sent to the orphanage through a sweet-hearted young woman, Carol. Aware that Pata had a brother and friends, all of them boys, Mili convinces José Ricardo to allow males in the manor, against the will of José Ricardo's ambitious sister Carmen the witch. Carol advised Mili when the young girl experienced her first period. For the first time in a Chiquititas production, Pata's brother Mosca falls for Mili and gives her an old book of fairy tales. Mili asks Sofia to write the tale's ending in the book, and Sofia only writes that is up to her to discover the end. Sofia asks Carol to take care of the orphans and passes away. Despite attracted to him as well, Mili is insecure about Mosca and becomes fond for Duda, a spoiled boy who gradually changes after meeting her, and later for JP, an aspiring singer, causing jealousy in Mosca and JP's girlfriend Renata. Mili's father Miguel returns from after several years recluse in the Amazon forest, with half of his face covered with scars, hidden under a mask. Searching for his daughter, Miguel is hidden by his mother Valentina (the Almeida Campos family's housekeeper) in the manor's basement, from where he is able to lurk and watch throughout the house and its inhabitants. Miguel briefly reunites with Gabriela (who shortly regains consciousness), but her father's henchmen separate the couple once again. As Gabriela ran from them, she fell on a rock and lost her memory. When José Ricardo succumbs to a heart failure, Mili decides to visit him in the hospital with some other chiquititas (and Carol, who was blackmailed by him in order to break up with his son Júnior). From the bed, José Ricardo asks forgiveness to Mili, leaving her confused, and later passes away as well. Carmen sees in this her chance to become the only heiress of her family's wealth, sending Gabriela to France and lying to her brother Júnior that Gabriela died in a helicopter crash. Valentina, aware that Mili is her lost granddaughter, is run over by a car and falls into a coma, leaving Miguel desperate. Júnior, however, is resolute to uncover the truth. Matilde, who is posing as her twin sister Ernestina (the manor's janitor), discovers the truth about Mili and blackmails Carmen. The two come into agreement and Carmen allows Matilde to have a percent of "her" inheritance. They confuse Miguel, making him think that Bia is his lost daughter, but the masked man, while lurking them, also discovers that Matilde is not who she claims to be and threatens her. Instructed by Carmen, Matilde lies and tells him his daughter is named Marian.

After Carmem's several attempts of placing Marian as Gabriela's daughter, Carol and Júnior eventually discover the truth, and Carol reunites Mili and the chiquititas to tell them Mili's story. The girl is kidnapped by Carmem, and saved by Mosca and her friends. In the end, Gabriela and Miguel are reunited with Mili. The series ends with a celebration of Mili's fifteenth birthday at the Raio de Luz manor, as the fairy tale she told the chiquititas at the beginning also comes to an end.

== Mexican version ==
Ixchel del Paso portrayed Mili in the Mexican series.
