= Refollow =

Brazilian teen web series

- Genre: Drama; Teen drama; Mockumentary
- Created by: Gustavo Braga
- Written by: Andreza Porto; Gustavo Braga; Luiz Felipe Pereira Santos
- Directed by: Rica Mantoanelli
- Starring: Gianlucca Mauad; Giovanna Chaves; Gui Vieira; Vivi Lucas; Cintia Cruz; Davi Campolongo
- Country of origin: Brazil
- Original language: Portuguese
- No. of seasons: 1
- No. of episodes: 8 (expected)

Production
- Camera setup: Single-camera
- Running time: 10–15 minutes
- Production company: Núcleo Íris Abravanel

Original release
- Network: +SBT
- Release: 11 September 2025 – present
- Network: TV ZYN
- Release: 16 September 2025 – present

Refollow is a Brazilian teen drama web series produced by SBT through its youth-oriented channel TV ZYN, in partnership with Núcleo Íris Abravanel. The series premiered on 11 September 2025 via the streaming platform +SBT. A release date for free-to-air television has not yet been confirmed. It is SBT’s second production in this format, following A Fantástica Máquina de Sonhos (2021).

Created and written by Andreza Porto, Gustavo Braga, and Luiz Felipe Pereira Santos, the series stars Gianlucca Mauad, Giovanna Chaves, Gui Vieira, Vivi Lucas, Cintia Cruz, and Davi Campolongo.

== Plot ==
Luan, Giullia, Camila, Bruno, Diego, and Bianca are inseparable—a group of best friends who stick together through parties and tough times. Among them, Bianca (Vivi Lucas) dreams big: an aspiring influencer, she’ll do anything to join Refollow, a reality show that takes young people abroad in search of fame and fulfillment. Meanwhile, she’s dating Bruno (Gui Vieira), the typical bad boy who seems indifferent to everything—except Giullia (Giovanna Chaves), a law student determined to prove to her parents that her true talent lies in filmmaking. The group also includes Luan (Gianlucca Mauad), Bianca’s ex-boyfriend; the radiant and independent Camila (Cintia Cruz), who longs for freedom; and Diego (Davi Campolongo), the hopeless romantic who’s always in love.

The twist comes when Refollow announces its first Brazilian edition—and to everyone’s surprise, all six friends are selected. But there’s a catch: they can only participate if they all agree together. Accepting the challenge, they move into an apartment, competing for a mysterious prize while trying to gain the most followers.

Between challenges, strategies, and pressure, their friendship begins to unravel. Hidden feelings, old rivalries, and buried secrets surface, revealing unexpected layers in each of them. How far are they willing to go to win? And what matters more: fame... or loyalty?

== Cast ==
Actor	Character
Vivi Lucas	Bianca (Bibi)
Gui Viera	Bruno
Giovanna Chaves	Giullia (Giu)
Gianlucca Mauad	Luan
Cinthia Cruz	Camila (Câmis)
Davi Campolongo	Diego
Luccas Amorim	Mr. Zyn

== Production ==
Following a crisis in SBT’s drama department—marked by the modest performance of Poliana Moça (2022–23) and the failures of A Infância de Romeu e Julieta (2023–24) and A Caverna Encantada (2024–25) due to fatigue in children’s telenovelas—the network announced a “strategic pause” in the genre. This sparked speculation about a possible return to adult-oriented scripts, which had been discontinued after Corações Feridos (2012).

There was an attempt to acquire Scars of Beauty from Max to test audience interest, but SBT denied any format change and announced that its next production would remain family-oriented.

At a press event on 15 May 2025, Daniela Beyruti announced that SBT would produce its own dorama, adopting a short-format series model not explored since the 2021 adaptation of the film Exterminadores do Além contra a Loira do Banheiro. She also confirmed the airing of the Mexican telenovela Las hijas de la señora García during the programming hiatus.

Production of Refollow began in June, featuring a reality-inspired aesthetic with cellphone cameras, visible lapel mics, and fourth-wall breaks—creating a near-mockumentary style that draws viewers into the narrative. The cast includes familiar faces from SBT’s audience: Gianlucca Mauad, Giovanna Chaves, Gui Vieira, Vivi Lucas, Cintia Cruz, and Davi Campolongo.

The script is written by Andreza Porto, Gustavo Braga, and Luiz Felipe Pereira Santos, who also worked on A Caverna Encantada. Refollow marks the return of teen drama to SBT, following the 2018 series Z4, a co-production with Disney.

== Episodes ==
No.	Title	Directed by	Written by	Original release date
1	Episode 1	Rica Mantoanelli	Andreza Porto, Gustavo Braga, Luiz Felipe Pereira Santos	September 11, 2025
Bianca dreams of joining Refollow. Bruno supports her, and a surprise arrives: she and Luan are among the chosen.
2	Episode 2	Rica Mantoanelli	Andreza Porto, Gustavo Braga, Luiz Felipe Pereira Santos	September 11, 2025
Bianca, Bruno, Luan, Giullia, Camila, and Diego are selected for Refollow.
3	Episode 3	Rica Mantoanelli	Andreza Porto, Gustavo Braga, Luiz Felipe Pereira Santos	September 18, 2025
Giullia receives her first mission in Refollow, and an unexpected moment with Bruno creates tension.
4	Episode 4	Rica Mantoanelli	Andreza Porto, Gustavo Braga, Luiz Felipe Pereira Santos	September 18, 2025
During a game of Truth or Dare, the group faces surprises and tensions that put everyone to the test.
