= Vittória Seixas =

Brazilian actress and singer (born 2008)

Vitória Seixas
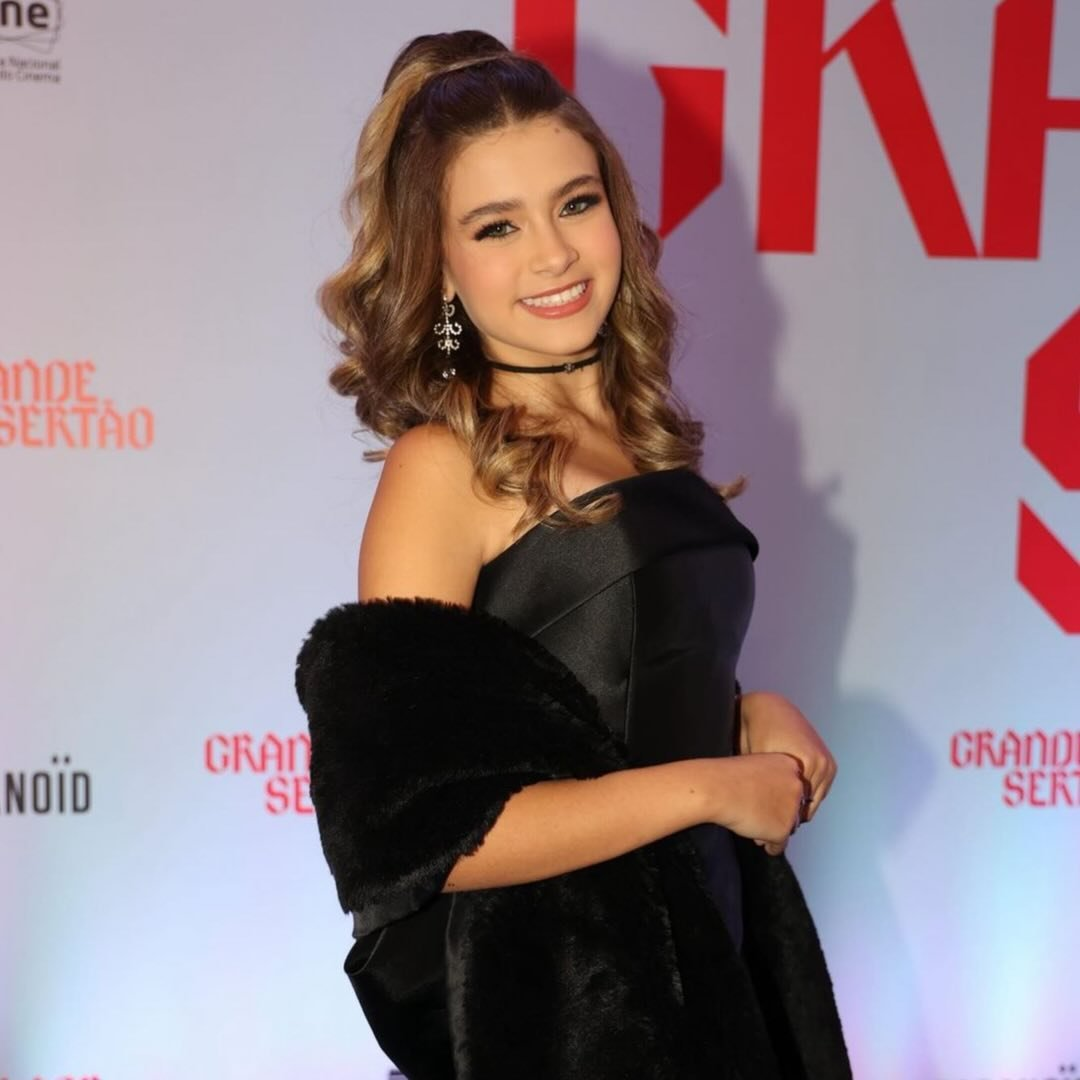
- Seixas in 2024.
- Born: Vitória Rangel Seixas Gomes; 22 December 2008 (age 17); Rio de Janeiro, Brazil
- Occupations: Actress; singer; model
- Years active: 2017–present
- Height: 1.59 m (5 ft 3 in)
- Website: vittoriaseixas.com

Vitória Rangel Seixas Gomes (born December 22, 2008) best known as Vittória Seixas is a Brazilian actress and singer. She acted in O Rico e Lázaro and O Sétimo Guardião, having gained visibility for starring as the character Julieta in the telenovela A Infância de Romeu e Julieta, on SBT and Prime Video. For the telenovela's soundtrack, she sang the song "Foi Assim", with Heitor Teixeira.

== Life and career ==
Vitória was born in 2008, she's from Rio and lives in Rio de Janeiro. Her artistic career began in the theater at the age of five. Since then, she has appeared in several plays, soap operas and films.

She is currently starring in the soap opera A Infância de Romeu e Julieta, on SBT and Prime Vídeo, in which she plays the protagonist Julieta. Vittória says she is inspired by actresses Sophia Valverde and Larissa Manoela. "It's wonderful to see them on stage with so much talent from such a young age, as well as following the development of their careers on TV and in the movies," she said. In an interview with Ana Maria magazine, Vittória commented that she had been re-watching the soap operas Carrossel and Chiquititas and Poliana Moça to find inspiration for her character. "I've been watching Carrossel, Chiquititas and Poliana Moça. It's wonderful to see them on stage with so much talent from such a young age, and the development of their careers in the movies. In fact, being at SBT, this dream factory, where they all started is my biggest and best gift," she revealed.

== Filmography ==
=== Television ===
Year	Title	Role	Notes
2017	O Rico e Lázaro	Ainoã	
2018–2019	O Sétimo Guardião	Cristiane	
2019	Imagem Vinil	Valquíria	
2021	Quanto Mais Vida, Melhor!	Young Bianca Villas Marino "Bibi"	
2023–2024	A Infância de Romeu e Julieta	Julieta Campos Matos "Juli"	

=== Film ===
Year	Title	Role	Ref.
2015	O Zelador	Carol	
2019	Uma Tia da Pesada	Amanda	
2024	Grande Sertão	Young Diadorim	
2025	Enterre Seus Mortos	Mariana	

== Stage ==
Ano	Title	Role	Ref.
2019	High School Musical		
2019	Shrek, o Musical	Young Fiona	
2019	Shrek, o Musical	Baby Bear	
2020	Uma Aventura na Neve 2	Young Anna	
2020	Uma Aventura na Neve 2	Troll	
2022	Annie		
2022	O Reino de Simba	Young Nala	
