= O Sétimo Guardião =

Brazilian telenovela

- Genre: Telenovela
- Created by: Aguinaldo Silva
- Directed by: Allan Fiterman
- Creative director: Rogério Gomes
- Starring: Lilia Cabral; Bruno Gagliasso; Marina Ruy Barbosa; Tony Ramos; Flávia Alessandra; Carolina Dieckmann; Yanna Lavigne; Marcello Novaes; Antônio Calloni
- Opening theme: "The Chain" by Fleetwood Mac
- Country of origin: Brazil
- Original language: Portuguese
- No. of episodes: 161

Production
- Production location: Salvador, Bahia
- Camera setup: Multi-camera
- Production company: Estúdios Globo

Original release
- Network: TV Globo
- Release: 12 November 2018 – 17 May 2019

O Sétimo Guardião is a Brazilian telenovela produced and broadcast by TV Globo. It premiered on 12 November 2018, replacing Segundo Sol, and ended on 17 May 2019, being replaced by A Dona do Pedaço. It was created by Aguinaldo Silva and directed by Allan Fiterman.

== Plot ==
In Serro Azul, a city in the interior of Minas Gerais, where the internet signal has not yet arrived, a source with rejuvenating and curative properties is protected by seven guardians—Mayor Eurico (Dan Stulbach), delegate Machado (Milhem Cortaz), the doctor Aranha (Paulo Rocha), the beggar Feliciano (Leopoldo Pacheco), the cafetina Ondina (Ana Beatriz Nogueira), the esoteric Milu (Zezé Polessa) and the guardian Egídio (Antônio Calloni)—take public notice and fall into the wrong hands. They also protect Léon the cat (Eduardo Moscovis), a former guardian who was punished by the forces of nature to live in animal form for breaching one of the rules: not to constitute a family. When Egídio dies, he leaves in search of the new seventh guardian, because only then his charm will be finally broken. In São Paulo, Gabriel (Bruno Gagliasso) sees Léon through the streets and, mysteriously, feels that he must go to Serro Azul with the certainty that his destiny is there. He abandons the bride, Laura (Yanna Lavigne), at the altar, but on the escape ends up in a vehicular accident, subsequently being saved by the mystical powers of Luz (Marina Ruy Barbosa).

Everything changes with the arrival of Gabriel's mother, Valentina (Lilia Cabral), a great cosmetologist who was born in Serro Azul and left for the capital in search of power. With the help of unscrupulous driver Sampaio (Marcello Novaes), she returns only to discover the secrets of the source wealth. She will also be the great impediment of Luz and Gabriel's affair, since she was destined to flee from bankruptcy by marrying her son with Laura, daughter of the powerful Olavo (Tony Ramos), who was willing to merge the companies of the two families and now swears to destroy the shrew. In addition, the couple have to deal with Laura's revenge and the obsession of the arrogant ex-boyfriend of Luz, Enrico Júnior (José Loreto), and the envious Lourdes (Bruna Linzmeyer), who plays with the feelings of the naive Geandro (Caio Blat), but wants Gabriel. Also returning to the city is Neide (Viviane Araújo), Luz's mother who fled after she was born. She was indirectly responsible for Léon being turned into a cat, since he promised to take her pregnancy even against the rules of the guardians and, after punishing the source, left her believing that she was abandoned.

The city still keeps other stories, such as Mirtes (Elizabeth Savalla), a fervent blessed who lives supervising the lives of others, especially Nora Stella (Vanessa Giácomo), whom she always humbles for not giving her grandchildren, and of João Inácio (Paulo Vilhena), the ex-husband of her deceased daughter, who is in love with the gaga prostitute Stefânia (Carol Duarte). Maltoni (Matheus Abreu) is a handsome sexton who attracts girls to the church to admire him and lives a forbidden romance with Elisa (Giullia Buscacio), daughter of the conservative Jurandir (Paulo Miklos), who wants her to become a nun. Already Machado is a false macho man addicted to robbing panties of the neighbours to use in the bed with his wife Rita (Flávia Alessandra) in a fiery and comical relation, causing a great mystery in the city. Aphrodite (Carolina Dieckmann) lives in conflict with her husband, the cook Nicolau (Marcelo Serrado), for wanting to have a son, although they are already parents of four—three girls and a boy who hates sports. There is also the transgender Marcos Paulo (Nany People), who despite having become a woman, still demands to be called by the birth name.

== Cast ==
- Bruno Gagliasso as Gabriel Marsalla
- Marina Ruy Barbosa as Luz da Lua Vidal
- Lília Cabral as Valentina Marsalla / Marlene Rocha
- Tony Ramos as Olavo Aragão Duarte
- Eduardo Moscovis as Murilo Vidal / Leon
- Marcello Novaes as José Sampaio de Oliveira Gomes
- Isabela Garcia as Judith Alvares
- Dan Stulbach as Eurico Rocha
- Letícia Spiller as Marilda Rocha
- José Loreto as Eurico Rocha Júnior / Júnior
- Yanna Lavigne as Laura Aragão Duarte
- Caio Blat as Geandro Rocha
- Bruna Linzmeyer as Lourdes Maria Leme
- Elizabeth Savalla as Mirtes Aranha
- Nany People as Marcos Paulo Pianoviski Mattoso
- Vanessa Giácomo as Stella Aranha
- Paulo Rocha as José Aranha
- Carolina Dieckmann as Afrodite Zerzil
- Marcelo Serrado as Nicolau Zerzil
- Laryssa Ayres as Diana Zerzil
- Gabriel Stauffer as Walid Simões
- Giulia Gayoso as Rivalda Zerzil
- Paulo Vilhena as João Inácio Dias
- Carol Duarte as Stefânia
- Caio Manhente as Guilherme Dias Aranha
- Cauê Campos as Arnaldo Alvares "Feijão"
- Fernanda de Freitas as Louise Marie Dechamps
- Theodoro Cochrane as Adamastor Davis Crawford
- Marcos Caruso as Sóstenes Vidal
- Zezé Polessa as Milu Negromonte
- Paulo Miklos as Jurandir
- Ana Beatriz Nogueira as Ondina Aballo
- Leopoldo Pacheco as Feliciano Pataxó
- Milhem Cortaz as Joubert Machado
- Flávia Alessandra as Rita de Cássia Machado
- Aílton Graça as Padre Ramiro
- Heitor Martinez as Robério Alvares
- Matheus Abreu as Maltoni Ferraz
- Giullia Buscacio as Elisa Rangel
- Marcello Melo Jr. as Fabim
- Eduardo Speroni as Roberto "Bebeto" Zerzil
- Jaffar Bambirra as Leonardo Lounge Léo
- Inês Peixoto as Maria do Socorro Leme
- Guida Vianna as Firmina Assunção / Josefa da Cruz
- Viviane Araújo as Neide Assunção
- Roberto Birindelli as Tobias Lounge
- Adriana Lessa as Clotilde Lounge
- Lucci Ferreira as Patrício Nasser
- Josie Pessoa as Luciana
- Lyv Ziese as Katiucha
- Mila Carmo as Januária
- Simone Zucato as Beata Liliane
- Talita Fusco as Beata Roseane
- Felipe Hintze as Peçanha
- Julia Konrad as Raimunda Leme
- Robson Santos as Alfredo
- Fábio Tokay as Jorge
- Liza Gomes as Lucilene
- Maureen Miranda as Dida
- Ana Paula Novellino as Jane
- Ana Clara Couto as Margareth Lounge
- Vittoria Seixas as Cristiana Zerzil

== Soundtrack ==
=== Volume 1 ===
O Sétimo Guardião: Vol. 1

Soundtrack album by Various artists
- Released: 25 January 2019
- Length: 49:02
- Label: Som Livre

O Sétimo Guardião Vol. 1 is the first soundtrack of the telenovela, released on 25 January 2019 by Som Livre.

No.	Title	Artist(s)	Length
1.	"Vim pra Ficar"	Iza	3:43
2.	"Rap du Bom Parte II"	Rappin' Hood & Caetano Veloso	3:25
3.	"Ai Amor"	Anavitória	3:31
4.	"Nossa Música"	UM44K	3:16
5.	"Entre a Serpente e a Estrela"	Zé Ramalho	3:42
6.	"Princípio Ativo"	Paulo Miklos	3:20
7.	"Ain't No Reason"	Brett Dennen	3:47
8.	"A Estrada Me Chama"	Zeca Baleiro	3:45
9.	"Corrente"	Banda Fuze	3:45
10.	"When the Curtain Falls"	Greta Van Fleet	3:20
11.	"White Rabbit"	Haley Reinhart	3:24
12.	"Outra Vez"	Lanna Rodrigues	3:15
13.	"Melatonin"	Phoria	3:31
14.	"Pra Swingar"	Som Nosso de Cada Dia	3:38
15.	"Dona da Minha Cabeça"	Geraldo Azevedo	3:27
Total length:			49:02

=== Volume 2 ===
O Sétimo Guardião: Vol. 2

Soundtrack album by Various artists
- Released: 15 March 2019
- Length: 45:01
- Label: Som Livre

O Sétimo Guardião Vol. 2 is the second soundtrack of the telenovela, released on 15 March 2019 by Som Livre.

No.	Title	Artist(s)	Length
1.	"These Boots Are Made for Walkin'"	Lewonda	2:38
2.	"Tudo Vira Bosta"	Rita Lee	3:42
3.	"Flor da Pele"	Zeca Baleiro & Rachell Luz	3:37
4.	"Nunca Foi Sorte"	Luísa Sonza	3:12
5.	"Truth"	Alex Ebert	4:20
6.	"Beyond"	Leon Bridges	4:00
7.	"17+ Forever"	William Fitzsimmons	3:49
8.	"Homem Com H"	Ney Matogrosso	2:52
9.	"Tango Nostalgia"	Roberta Lima	2:12
10.	"Pink Up"	Spoon	5:53
11.	"Too Bad"	Giulia Be	3:18
12.	"Clichê"	Ludmilla & Felipe Araújo	3:10
13.	"Toda Hora É Hora"	Sorriso Maroto	2:18
Total length:			45:01

== Controversy ==
The telenovela was accused of treating homosexuality as a punishment during the episode shown on the night of 22 January 2019, the character Eurico had to choose between two punishments for having betrayed the brotherhood: never to feel sexual attraction to women again, only to men, or to turn into a cat for life.

On 27 February 2019, Joseph Lima dos Santos, an extra, died during filming of the telenovela. According to employees involved in the production of the telenovela, the production crew removed his body from the set, and continued filming as if nothing had happened.

The telenovela was also accused of plagiarizing the book As Muralhas da Vida Eterna: Uma Metáfora Sobre o Tempo, by Barbara Rastelli, published in 2015. According to the author, she delivered the book to Globo to develop a telenovela based on this book, but the broadcaster refused the proposal. However, it was noted that some elements of the telenovela resembled her book.

== Ratings ==
Season	Timeslot (BRT/AMT)	Episodes	First aired		Last aired		Avg. viewers (points)
Season	Timeslot (BRT/AMT)	Episodes	Date	Viewers (in points)	Date	Viewers (in points)	Avg. viewers (points)
1	Mon–Sat 9:15 p.m.	161	12 November 2018	33	17 May 2019	34	28.8
