= Giovanna Chaves =

Brazilian actress and singer (born 2001)

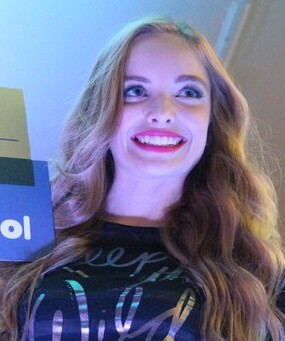
- Chaves, 2016
- Born: Giovanna Júlly Lopes Chaves; December 4, 2001 (age 24); São Paulo, Brazil
- Occupations: Actress; singer; songwriter; writer; voice actor; model
- Years active: 2012–present

Giovanna Júlly Lopes Chaves (born December 4, 2001) is a Brazilian actress, singer and songwriter. She is best known for her role on Cúmplices de um Resgate, in which she played one of the antagonists, Priscila.

== Biography and career ==
Chaves was born on December 4, 2001, in the municipality of São Paulo, in Brazil. Giovanna has a sister named Bruna Caroline Lopes Chaves Namorado Felipe Domingos Martins. She started her career at 9 months of age, when she participated in the recording of a DVD of the show Gugu. She did advertising work, fashion shows, catalogs and participated in some television programs, including Ídolos Kids and Programa do Gugu. Today, Giovanna is known for acting in Cúmplices de um Resgate, giving life to antagonist Priscilla.

=== Musical career ===
After having participated in the Ídolos Kids program, she released their first CD called Giovanna Chaves in 2012. The soundtrack of more success was to Imaginar that was part of the soundtrack of the novel Chiquititas. Along with the success of the Cúmplices de um Resgate novel of a rescue, Giovanna released his second CD called Vem Comigo in 2016 in which is very successful among young people from all over Brazil.

== Filmography ==
=== Television ===
| Year | Title | Role |
|---|---|---|
| 2012 | Ídolos Kids | Competitor |
| 2015–16 | Cúmplices de um Resgate | Priscila Meneses Saldanha |
| 2018 | Samantha! | Valentina |
| 2018 | Jovens Talentos | Judge |
| 2023 | A Infância de Romeu e Julieta | Herself |
| 2025 | Refollow | Giullia |

=== Film ===
| Year | Title | Role | Notes |
|---|---|---|---|
| 2017 | Smurfs: The Lost Village | Smuflor | Brazilian voice role |
| 2018 | Nada a Perder | Cristiane Cardoso | |
| 2019 | Nada a Perder 2 | Cristiane Cardoso | In production |

=== Videoclips ===
| Year | Title | Artist |
|---|---|---|
| 2018 | "Estrela Cadente" | Pedro Thomé |

== Literature ==
| Year | Title |
|---|---|
| 2017 | O Amor em Poucas Linhas |

== Discography ==
- Giovanna Chaves (2014)
- Vem Comigo (2016)

=== Soundtrack ===
- 2013 (Chiquititas) – "Imaginar"
- 2016 (Cúmplices de um Resgate) – "Superstar" (with Larissa Manoela and choir)
- 2013 (Cúmplices de um Resgate) – "Juntos" (with Larissa Manoela and choir)

== Awards and nominations ==
| Year | Award | Category | Work | Result |
|---|---|---|---|---|
| 2016 | Prêmio Destaque Personalidade Brasil | Actress | Cúmplices de um Resgate | Won |
| 2016 | Prêmio Jovem Brasileiro | Best Young Actress | Cúmplices de um Resgate | Nominated |
| 2017 | Meus Prêmios Nick | Digital Revelation | Herself | Won |
| 2018 | Prêmio Jovem Brasileiro | Best Young Actress | Nada a Perder | Nominated |
| 2018 | Meus Prêmios Nick | Favorite Instagram | Herself | Nominated |
