= Chiquititas (1997 Brazilian TV series) =

Brazilian telenovela

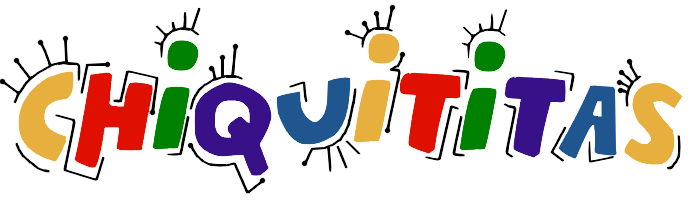
- Also known as: Chiquititas 1997; Chiquititas Brasil
- Genre: Soap opera
- Created by: Cris Morena; Gustavo Barrios; Patricia Maldonado
- Developed by: Gustavo Barrios; Caio de Andrade
- Written by: Caio de Andrade; Délia Maunas; Ricardo Morteo; Horacio Marshall
- Directed by: Hernan Abrahamsohn; Gustavo Luppi; Claudio Ferrari; José Luiz Massa (music videos)
- Starring: Flávia Monteiro; Fernanda Souza; Aretha Oliveira; Ana Olívia Seripieri; Carla Diaz; Alex Benn; Nelson Freitas; Marcos Pasquim; Carmo Dalla Vecchia; Débora Falabella
- Opening theme: "Remexe" (season 1) "Mexe Lá" (season 2) "Mexe Já" (season 3) "Me Dá Um Ch" (season 4) "Sempre Chiquititas" (season 5)
- Countries of origin: Brazil; Argentina
- Original language: Portuguese
- No. of seasons: 5

Production
- Producer: Cris Morena
- Running time: 45 minutes
- Production company: SBT

Original release
- Network: SBT
- Release: 28 July 1997 – 19 January 2001

Related
- Chiquititas, 2013 remake Chiquititas, original series

Chiquititas, also known as Chiquititas 1997 or Chiquititas Brasil, is the Brazilian version of the Argentine soap opera Chiquititas. Produced and aired from 28 July 1997 to 19 January 2001 by SBT, in association with Telefe, the show starred Brazilian actresses Flávia Monteiro as Carolina "Carol" Correia, Fernanda Souza as Mili, and Débora Falabella, as Estrela, being the last two's careers debut.

Based on the original version of same name created and produced by Cris Morena, the soap opera tells the story of a group of orphans that live in a manor, known as Raio de Luz, whose lives are touched and changed by Carol. Their experiences such as discovering first love, deceptions, loneliness and friendship, as well as adventures in fantasy, are depicted throughout the series. The narrative is enhanced by musical themes and videos. The Brazilian soap opera ran for five seasons until SBT's contract with Telefe ended in 2001.

On 19 September 2012, SBT announced a new version of Chiquititas, which premiered on 15 July 2013, following the good ratings obtained by the 2012 remake of Carrusel. Unlike Chiquititas Brasil, the new Chiquititas production is completely made in Brazil, and is the first without involvement of Cris Morena.

== Story line ==
Chiquititas Brasil received mild alterations from Chiquititas throughout its storyline.

=== Season One ===
Soon after Gabriela had a child, her father José Ricardo Almeida Campos kidnapped his granddaughter because, as a very conservative man, he could not accept the idea that his daughter became involved with an employee. As his granddaughter Mili needs a place to live, he creates an orphanage named "Raio de Luz" ("Light Gleam", originally "Rincón de Luz", which means "Corner of Light"). Mili grew up in this Manor alongside other girls that later arrived. Her fellows are Bia, Ana, sisters Tati and Vivi, and Cris. As the years passed, the girls became a family. They are supervisioned by Ernestina, the rigorous and funny janitor of the orphanage, and Chico, the adorable Chef very beloved by the girls. Emilia is the director of the orphanage until Carmem, an ambitious woman who's also sister of José Ricardo, takes her off this position.

Soon, a new girl known as Pata is introduced. She initially does not get along with the other girls, but later is well accepted and becomes their friend, and particularly Mili's best friend. In this orphanage full of hopes and dreams, each of the chiquititas, guided by Mili, will live thousands of adventures full of love, friendship and fun. Pata later meets her half-brother, nicknamed Mosca. Initially considered a "delinquent" by Carmem, he then becomes the first male infant upheld by the place, awakening Cris and Vivi's feelings. Ernestina becomes tired of being pranked by the girls and is replaced by Matilde, her stricter (and darker) identical twin sister that won't tolerate their banters, as Carmem, the orphanage director, greedily manages to own the Manor where Raio de Luz is localized to herself.

The girls' lives will be touched and changed by Carolina, or Carol, a young woman that works in one of the Almeida's factories and studies for social working. Carol lives with her friend Clarita and her somewhat rascal brother Beto. They take care of Dani, a girl that recently lost her mother. In the factory, Carol meets Junior, Ricardo's oldest son, an economist that lived in London and is back to São Paulo due to work.

They'll fall in love with each other but José Ricardo, snobbish, will do anything to keep them apart. His daughter, Gabriela, became mentally affected since she believes she had a stillbirth child, actually a lie her father told her right after Mili was born. Her serious condition is softened by Mili herself, both unaware of their blood ties.

=== Season Two ===
After Ricardo's tragic death, his sister Carmem is chosen to be in charge of his fortune. She manages to keep the secret Ricardo most wanted to protect: Mili's true origins. Meanwhile, is a new beginning in Carol's life, since she was named the orphanage director by Ricardo himself, right before he died in a car crash in the previous season. Junior left São Paulo once again, this time with Gabriela, seeking psychological treatment for her. Due to the distance, Carol brokes up with him as she meets a new man in her life, doctor Fernando Brausen. Brausen is Dani's physio after she suffered an accident in the manor and became seriously paralysed.

Carol also meets a girl abandoned in the streets, named Maria, who Carol upholds as her own daughter. Since the remaining girls start to interact with the newcomer boys, Mili discovers her first love when she meets Júlio. Maria later finds out that her favourite doll Laurinha is actually able to be alive itself.

Actress Flávia Monteiro with the young cast of Chiquititas Brasil, Season Two.

Maria uncovers a mysterious Phantom of the Opera-like figure living inside the hidden areas of the manor, a man named Miguel. He's a friend of Fernando from the past, who Fernando thought was dead after an airplane crash. The man actually survived the accident, which had left a scar on his face. Also, Miguel believes that one of the resident chiquititas is his lost daughter, she possibly being Bia, Cris, or Mili. He helps Maria in the search for her mother, whom she lived with in the streets before being taken off by Carol and Clarita. Maria's background is later revealed by her mother, Esther, to Carol. Esther explains that, since she was infertile, her second husband became abusive and deposited his hatred onto the little girl. Maria was then forced to be abandoned by her mother. The repentant woman would later vainly get back to look for her daughter. Esther is once again reunited with Maria, saying goodbye to the little girl, as she dies due to her broken death.

Formerly alcoholic, the father of Vivi and Tati comes back to their lives as he's rehabilitated. Since Vivi would not come back, she says goodbye to the Manor and particularly to Mosca, who was her first love. Ana is adopted by a business executive and takes her best friend Fábio with her. As some of the original chiquititas finally find their parents and leave the manor, new children are later welcomed, increasing the family inside Raio de Luz.

=== Season Three - At the corner ===
Carmem finally manages to close the orphanage. However, Carol and the youngsters receive the help of a mysterious man named Pedro Vega who donates his old mansion to them. The huge, beautiful manor is located at the corner of the Harmony Alley. In its initially creepy insides, they'll meet Helena, the house's governess, a baleful and mean-spirited woman who keeps her granddaughter Lúcia locked in a windowless bedroom, in order to "protect" her. In the neighbourhood, the youngsters make new friends. Their life starts to change since some of them are leaving their childhood behind and are starting to grow, as they experiment their first love and will realize the power of friendship. One of the orphans, mischievous boy Neco, soon discovers Lúcia and became her friend for life, showing her the world and gradually making her part of their family, against Elena's will. Mosca (the first male orphan welcomed by the orphanage) soon discovers he has a serious bone disease, and faces this particular obstacle in this season.

The relationship between Carol and Fernando will be torn apart thanks to Andréa, Fernando's former fiancée, and their son Diego. An unscrupulous man named Felipe Mendes Ayala demonstrates interest to orphan Maria, to whom Carolina became maternally attached, and they will fight in court for her custody.

Adult and young cast of Chiquititas Brasil in Season Three

Tati comes back to the Manor due to her non-adaptation to her family's conditions, also because she overly missed her friends. She experiments first love feelings with Tatu, one of the boys of the Harmony Alley, but their relationship does not work out. Fran and Samuca start being more than friends, but Marian and Bel interfere in their relationship. Marian is a troubled orphan; Bel resides in the Harmony Alley and is the best friend of Lila and Janu, a girl who is uncertain between Mosca and André. Lila also develops her feelings for Mosca, despite the disapproval of her mother.

Gabriela returns sane to São Paulo, she and Mili reapproximate, and they become closer each day with Carmem following them closely, trying to keep them from knowing the secret and their true ties. She joins forces to Marian, an orphan with bad intentions who's jealous of Mili, doing everything to hinder her life. Due to Marian's deeds, Mili ends up blind after an accident, and her place as Gabriela's real daughter and Luca's girlfriend is taken by Marian. But in the end, the truth will finally emerge. The youngsters will also explore secrets kept in the Manor involving mysteries, magic, fantasy, and a hidden treasure, also wanted by Carmem.

As in the original version, during this season the first Raio de Luz orphanage is closed and re-opened in a new manor. Also, some of the more heavy and melodramatic storylines were dropped. The show's most popular character Mili, the protagonist played by Fernanda Souza, says goodbye and goes to a new life with her mother.

=== Season Four ===
After legal and personal fights with each other, Carolina and Felipe then fall in love. They dispute custody of Maria, the smallest among the orphans, as Felipe, under the new identity of Manoel, gets close to them and to the children in the Manor. Among new orphans introduced are Simão and Hannelore, newcomers from a reformatory after a presumed behavioral change. But this two will be very unpopular to the veterans due to their actions, also due to their affiliation to Elena. Mosca develops a stronger relationship with Lila, the girl next door, and Fran discovers her origins as an heiress of a huge fortune before she quits it due to her relatives' ambition. Later, she and her pals in the Manor reluctantly say goodbye to her love: the smart, adorable and former orphan Samuca, who was reunited with his father and is going to live with him. After her mother goes to psychological aid and his father is arrested for domestical violence, Bel moves to the Manor. During a tour, Tati gets lost in the forest, where she meets a fearless boy named Yago. She's rescued by Mosca and Manoel, and takes Yago with her to the manor. A young woman, Estrela, arrives in the house looking for work. At the day of their wedding, Carol and Manoel's romance is torn apart after she finds out the truth about his real identity.

In the fourth season's final episodes, some of the children are transferred to another institution in Rio de Janeiro, and Carolina makes a travel to promote the orphanage's activities, leaving the youngsters under the care of Alfredo the Chef and Estrela. The Book of Life is given by her to them, and the children says to Carol that she's "their shine", and that they'll be there waiting for her.

Tati leaves the show after four seasons as she is adopted alongside Yago. Helena, the main antagonist of this season, is a fugitive from the police after her criminal acts, and as the Manor became her property, it is sold on auction. The council intends to send the children to different places, and since the group of orphans don't want to be torn apart, Estrela remembers of her grandfather's house in a small town near to São Paulo. Mosca says emotionally says goodbye to Lila, as the orphans are forced to leave the Manor. They need to move faster, as tractors approach to knock their house down.

=== Season Five - Moving on ===
The group spent some time homeless, as Bruna, the youngest of the chiquititas, faithfully keeps the Book of Life gifted by Carol. Alfredo, Estrela and the remaining orphans then arrive in her grandfather's farm in São Dionísio, an inland small town. The orphans are welcomed in the farm, and everything seems fine until Estrela notices her grandpa is gone. Also, the farm is about to be demolished as it is located in an area occupied by a logging company. The orphans need to hide, as they are not supposed to be under such conditions. Near the farm is a rich mansion that also belongs to Estrela's family. Its owner is a young businessman named Rian, son of Tonico and the promoter of the deforestation project that threatens the graner. He lives with his only child, Lucas, and nephews Inês, Álvaro and Rodrigo. Inácia "Naná" is the rigorous housekeeper of Rian's family.

Rian then arrives from the United States, and later, his girlfriend Cora and her little daughter Talita also come to the mansion. Cora is an ambitious woman with an interest in Rian's fortune. She also brings Hannelore, a troubled orphan that lived in the Raio de Luz manor and was adopted by Cora soon after being transferred to a shelter in Rio de Janeiro. Hannelore then becomes Cora's accomplice in causing trouble to the orphans.

The cast of Chiquititas Brasil in the fifth and final season. Unlike the original version, the storyline was not rebooted.

Fran meets Rodrigo, a charming but crafty boy, and Yuri, a more loveable orphan and the first welcomed in this new Raio de Luz. Uncertain about her feelings, she finds herself divided between the two boys. Mosca starts working as a gardener in the mansion, and gets closer to Inês, a pampered and altered girl.

The children become desolated after assuming that Carol supposedly died in an airplane crash, but she later reappears from the skies, falling right on Rian and Cora's wedding cake with her balloon (just as Ana did in the original version). After her return, Carol settles in the granary, alongside Estrela, her adorable grandfather Tonico and, once again, reunited with the chiquititas. The granary then becomes their newest home, Raio de Luz, as well as a new orphanage. Carol's arrival makes Cora even more enraged, as her plans to send the orphans to a reformatory are ruined, as well as her greed over Rian's wealth. She also tries to separate Rian and Carol, who fall in love for each other.

An enormous tree is located in the very centre of the granary, which is a gateway to a magical world the youngsters later explore, known as The Anthill. In this place, they meet creatures like talking ants and find secret passages that link the granary to the mansion.

In the end of Chiquititas Brasil, Carolina and Rian get married and adopt part of the orphans, and the other ones are sent to another institution. Cora is caught in the act by the police after the help of a redeemed Hannelore. Half-brothers Mosca and Pata, who were in the show since Season One, are adopted by Amanda, an artist introduced in Season Three as Pata's supposed mother. Estrela ends up alongside Álvaro, and Fran chooses Yuri over Rodrigo, who is now Bel's boyfriend. The children say farewell to each other, as Bruna notices that the Book of Life is no longer placed upon its usual place.

Sitting on the feet of the Tree, Carol and her family watch the Book of Life fly away, as Carol states that "whoever finds this Book, will then find a light gleam that will brighten your life, forever and ever".

==== Cancellation ====
The fifth season was the last to be adapted for Brazilian audiences. In 2001, SBT was airing other soap operas directed for children, such as El diario de Daniela, which were providing higher ratings than Chiquititas at that time.

One of the clauses in SBT's contract with Telefe allowed SBT to produce Chiquititas in 2001 by itself, and the show could be filmed in Brazilian locations. However, Cris Morena had disagreements with Telefe and later broke relations with the Argentine net, which also have influenced on the end of Chiquititas Brasil.

== Cast ==
=== Adult cast from 1997 to 2001 ===
- Flávia Monteiro - Carolina Carol Corrêia (Belén) (1997-2001)
- Nelson Freitas - Fernando Brausen (Facundo) (1997-1999)
- Alex Benn - José Ricardo Júnior Almeida Campos Jr.(Martín Morán) / Rif-Raf (Hero from Mili's tale) (1997)
- Marcos Pasquim - Felipe/Manuel (Alejo/Manuel) (1998-1999)
- Carmo Dalla Vecchia - Rian Bragança D'Ávila (Juan) (2000-2001)
- Débora Falabella - Estrela (Candela) (1999-2001)
- Débora Olivieri - Carmen Almeida Campos (Carmen Morán) (1997-1999)
- Gésio Amadeu - Francisco (Chico) (Saverio) (1997-1998)
- Magali Biff - Ernestina/Matilde/Martirio (Ernestina/Matilde) (1997-1999)
- Serafim Gonzalez - Antônio Alberto D'Ávila Tonico (Joaquin) (2001-2001)
- Larissa Bracher - Cora Amarante Rocha (Pía) (2000-2001)
- Mateus Carrieri - Miguel (1998)
- Rogério Márcico - José Ricardo Almeida Campos (Ramiro Morán) (1997)
- Cláudia Santos - Gabriela Almeida Campos 1 (Gabi) (1997)
- Vanusa Ferlim - Gabriela Almeida Campos 2 (Gabi) (1998)
- Imara Reis - Helena (Elena) (1998-1999)
- Bianca Rinaldi - Andréa (Andrea) (1998-1999)
- Omar Calichio - Alfredo (Raul) (1998-2001)
- André Cursino - Álvaro (Alvaro/Mariano) (1999-2001)
- Neusa Maria Faro - Valentina Pereira (Valentina) (1997)
- Jiddu Pinheiro - Alberto (Beto) Corrêia (Piojo Fraga) (1997-1998)
- Fabiana Uria - Cíntia Werner (Ginette) (1997)
- Gustavo Haddad - Cadu (Piojo/Tommy) (1998-1999)
- Luciana Vicente - Clarita (Clarita) (1997)
- Bruno Gagliasso - Rodrigo Bragança D'Ávila (2000-2001)
- Malu Pessin - Inácia (Iaiá) (Elza) (2000-2001)
- Ângela Correa - Amanda Duarte (Amanda Del Solar) (1998-1999/2001)
- Valéria Sandalo - Teresa (Marcedes/Saverio) (1999)
- Cristina Bessa - Roberta (Clarita) (1997-1998)
- Guilherme Lima - Luca (Paul) (1998)
- Carmela Medeiros - Maria Cecília Veiga Lopes (Dolores) (1997)
- Ariel Moshe - Salvador (Salvador) (1998-1999)
- Lia de Aguiar - Condessa D'Egmont (1999)
- Leonardo Franco - Otávio (1997)
- Nelson Baskerville - Henrique Ribeiro (1997-1998)
- Fábio Aste - Armando (1997)
- Gabriel Pinheiro - João Pedro (Javier) (1998)
- Lyliá Virna - Julieta (Julieta) (1998-1999)
- Cecilia Arellano - Letícia (Leticia) (1997)
- Francarlos Reis - Cícero (1997)
- Carlos Mezquita - Tobias (Tobias) (1997)
- Carlos Weigle - Solano (1997)
- Bibi Vogel - Fernanda Veiga Lopes (1997)
- Maria Estela - Emília (1997)
- Karine Carballo - Renata (1998)
- Dino Moreno - Dr. Alfredo Ferrashi (Dr. Jorge Clementi) (1998)
- Glória Portella - Claúdia Ferrashi (1998)
- Manuela Assunção - Linda Ribeiro (1998)
- Bárbara Frank - Paula (1999)
- Luiz Fernando Petzhold - Juca (Loco) (1998)
- Cristina Sano - Satiko (1999)
- Carlos Mani - Renato (Aníbal) (1999)
- Jayme Berenguer - Axel (1998)
- Celso Batista - Oliveira Andrade (1998)
- Malu Rocha - Marina (1998)
- Paulo Leite Filho - Isidoro (1998)
- Sebastião Campos - Juiz Maia (1997)
- Lissandro Kaell - Vicente (1998)

=== Chiquititas and Chiquititos cast from 1997 to 2001 ===
- Fernanda Souza - Milena Mili Pereira (Mili) (1997-1998)
- Aretha Oliveira - Patrícia (Pata) (Jime) (1997-2001)
- Ana Olivia Seripieri - Tatiane (Tati) Cícero (Maru/George) (1997-1999)
- Francis Helena - Cristina (Cris) (George) (1997-1998)
- Renata Del Bianco - Viviane (Vivi) Cícero (Vero) (1997-1998)
- Gisele Frade - Beatriz (Bia) (Cinthia) (1997-1998)
- Beatriz Botelho - Luciana (Ana) (Laura) (1997-1998)
- Gisele Medeiros - Daniela (Dani) (Sol) (1997-1998)
- Pierre Bittencourt - Felipe (Mosca) (Mosca) (1997-2001)
- Felipe Chammas - Rafael (Rafa) (Corcho) (1997-1998)
- Luan Ferreira - Rubens (Binho) (Roña) (1997-1998)
- Paulo Nigro - Júlio (Julián) (1997-1998)
- Bruno de Andrade - Mathias Ferrashi (Matías) (1997)
- Carla Diaz - Maria (Nadia) (1997-1999)
- Mariane Oliva - Marian (Caro/Martina) (1998-1999)
- Ramon Leite - Thiago (1997) sendo substituído por Thiago Oliveira - Thiago (Tamara) (1997-1998)
- Laura Feliciano - Laurinha (Maria's doll) (1998)
- Pollyana López - Poliana (Polly) (Pila) (1998)
- Fábio Bruce - Fábio (Flor) (1998)
- Thiago Pinheiro - Guilherme (Guile) (Guille) (1998)
- Jonatas Faro - Samuca (Guille) (1998-1999)
- Allan César Dias - Neco (Roña) (1998-2001)
- Elisa Veeck - Fran (Pato/Camila) (1998-2001)
- Marina Belluzzo - Lúcia (Lucía) (1998-2001)
- Vivian Marques - Isabel (Bel) (Barbarita) (1998-2001)
- Victoria Rocha - Nádia (Mora) (1998-1999)
- Karen Rocca - Janu (Delfina) (1998-1999)
- Camila Beluzzo - Dina (Marquitos) (1998-1999)
- Chico Abreu - Tatu (Coco) (1998-2001)
- Nikolas Maciel - Janjão (Barracuda) (1998-1999)
- Thiago Farias - Gigio (Nico) (1998-1999)
- Rafael Pongelupi - André (Matías) (1998-1999)
- Cauê Braga - Diego (Dieguito) (1998-1999)
- Gabriela Miranda - Keila (Quela) (1998)
- Jander Veeck - Zeca (Corcho) (1999-2001)
- Felipe Reis - Leonardo (Léo) (1999)
- Gabriela Lebron - Lila (Lila/Delfina) (1998-1999)
- Sthefany Brito - Hannelore (Martina/Luisiana) (1999-2001)
- Maiara Otero - Cecília (Ciça) (Micaela) (1999)
- Bruna Guasco - Bruna (Cata) (1999-2001)
- Vanderson Paulino - Bernardo (Patricio) (1999)
- Thiago Santana - Simão (1999)
- Samir Alves - Iago (Yago) (1999)
- Rafael Perez Dutra - Bento (Nacho) (1999)
- Cauã Bernard Souza - Guido (1999)
- Greta Antoine - Inês (Ines) (2000-2001)
- Raissa Medeiros - Talita (Tali) (Natalia) (2000-2001)
- Caio Romei - Cassiano (Ruivo) (2000-2001)
- Yuri Xavier - Yuri (Felipe) (2000-2001)
- Giovanni Delgado - Lucas (Agustín) (2000-2001)
- Gabriel Belluzzo - Maurício (Maximiliano) (2000-2001)
- Kayky Brito - Fabrício (2000-2001)
- Lucas Lourenço - Matheus (Agustín) (2000-2001)

== Production ==
Brazilian TV show host and entrepreneur Silvio Santos, owner of SBT, originally wanted the show to be called Pequeninas, as it is the literal translation of "chiquititas" ("little girls") to Brazilian Portuguese. Actress Suzy Rêgo was initially considered to play the adult protagonist of this version, portrayed by Romina Yan in the original show, but the role eventually went to younger actress Flávia Monteiro, who took singing lessons to sing her musical themes by herself, without needing to dub them. Eight years later, in 2005, Rêgo would get a main role in Floribella, the Brazilian version of Floricienta, also created by Cris Morena.

In 1998 (Season Two), produced Roberto Monteiro hired screenwriter Caio de Andrade to translate and adapt the Argentine series. Andrade worked on the script until Chiquititas Brasil's final season, in 2000.

The songs were translated and adapted to Brazilian Portuguese by Caion Gadia, and differently from the original version, most of the actors dubbed the voices of professional singers in their themes. The exceptions were Flávia Monteiro, Gésio Amadeu, Omar Calicchio, Magali Biff and Débora Olivieri, from the adult cast.

The Brazilian series begun in 1997, when the Argentine version was in its third season, and it was shot in Buenos Aires, in the same Telefe studios and locations used for the original series, with Buenos Aires fitting as São Paulo in the storyline. With the exception of "Até 10" ("Up To 10") and "Sinais" ("Signs"), all the music videos were shot in Brazil, using locations such as the Museu Paulista's park, the Paulista Avenue, São Paulo's Theatro Municipal and the Latin America Memorial, among others throughout the country. Most part of the Season Five videos were shot in Fernando de Noronha.

== Reception ==
Soon after its debut, the show became extremely popular spawning hundreds of merchandising and selling over 3 million albums. Being part of the cast became a dream among many Brazilian children. In and in 1999, over 15.000 people in São Paulo, 10,000 in Rio de Janeiro and 6,000 in Recife attended the auditions for the show's third season, breaking the record for the biggest casting ever (as a comparison castings for Ídolos, the Brazilian version of American Idol, are attended by 2,000 people in each state and 4,000 in São Paulo).

Following the musical productions released in Argentina, the Brazilian version also had live musical presentations on its country, featuring the whole main cast, in 1998, when the show was on the third season. The cast and crew were supposed to be on tour throughout Recife, Fortaleza and Brasília, but due to budgetary issues, the tour was canceled and the group presented only in Rio de Janeiro and São Paulo. In 2000, when Chiquititas Brasil was on its fifth year, the videoclip "Adolescente" ("Teens") became one of the 10 most viewed on MTV Brasil.

== Legacy ==
In 2007, SBT aired Chiquititas 2000 (Chiquititas Season Six) as a single story in order to continue from the point the Brazilian adaptation stopped, under the tagline "A new adventure is about to start", albeit Chiquititas 1999 was not accurately adapted for the Brazilian audience. However, the airings attracted good ratings and in the following year, Chiquititas Sin Fin was aired.

The show catapulted the careers of several cast members, such as Carla Diaz, Fernanda Souza, Stephany Brito, Bruno Gagliasso and Débora Falabella. In 2011, Diaz portrayed Márcia in Rebelde Brasil, the Brazilian version for the series of same name created by Cris Morena.

== Remake ==
In September 19, SBT announced on its official website that a new production of Chiquititas for 2013, in order to maintain the positive ratings obtained by Carrossel, also directed for younger viewers.

Actress Manuela do Monte stars as Carol, and Giovanna Grigio portrays Mili.

Entirely produced in Brazil, the new plot is adapted by Carrossel's writer Iris Abravanel, Silvio Santos' wife.

== Notes ==
- The information in this article is based on that in its Portuguese equivalent.
