= Rafael Miguel =

Brazilian actor (1996–2019)

- Born: Rafael Henrique Miguel; 9 July 1996; São Paulo, Brazil
- Died: 9 June 2019 (aged 22); São Paulo, Brazil
- Occupation: Actor
- Years active: 2006–2015

Rafael Henrique Miguel (9 July 1996 – 9 June 2019) was a Brazilian actor. He was best known for his character Paçoca in the telenovela Chiquititas (2013) and previously for participating in a TV commercial playing a boy who demanded broccoli from his mother in a supermarket. On June 9, 2019, Miguel and his parents were murdered by his girlfriend's father when they arrived at the girl's house to discuss their relationship.

== Career ==
Miguel began his career in advertising during childhood, becoming known for the commercial for the nutritional supplement Sustagen, which required the line "mother, buy broccoli."

Miguel later followed this with numerous appearances in Brazilian TV series and TV films which made him known, especially among young people.

In 2006 Miguel debuted in the miniseries JK, playing the character Antenor and, in the same year, he joined the cast of the telenovela Cristal, playing the character Bentinho.

From 2006 to 2007 he played the son of Flávia Alessandra and Murilo Benicio in Pé na Jaca.

In 2009 he played Juca in Cama de Gato, the son of Heloísa Périssé and Marcello Novaes, who was more mature than the parents when intervening in their fights. From 2013 to 2015 Miguel played Paçoca in the telenovela Chiquititas.

== Personal life ==
Rafael Miguel, his father João and his mother Miriam were practising Roman Catholics.

Miguel had two sisters, one older, the other younger than him.

== Death ==
On 9 June 2019 Miguel and his parents met his girlfriend's father to discuss the progress of the relationship between the two. Miguel and his parents were murdered by his girlfriend's father. According to the G1 news site, citing a statement from local authorities, her father shot and killed them at his home, reportedly during a discussion about the relationship. His girlfriend suffered from depression, for which her father used as an excuse to blame Rafael; when the reality was that he was a violent man, that used to beat, torture and control his daughter and other members of his family. The murder of Miguel and his parents caused horror throughout Brazil, especially among fans of the series and telenovelas in which he starred.

On 10 June 2019 Miguel and his parents were buried in the Campo Grande cemetery, in the south of São Paulo.

The murder of Rafael Miguel and his parents is depicted in the 2025 television documentary series O Assassinato do Ator Rafael Miguel.

== Filmography ==
=== Film ===
Year	Title	Role	Notes
2007	Meu mundo em perigo	Ariel	
2008	O Natal do menino imperador	Antônio	TV movie

=== Television ===
Year	Title	Role	Notes
2006	JK	Antenor (child)	Episodes: "3–4 January"
2006	Cristal	Bentinho	
2007	Pé na Jaca	Percival Fortuna	
2009-2010	Cama de Gato	João Carlos Tibiriçá (Juca)	
2013–2015	Chiquititas	Paçoca	(final appearance)
