= Simone Zucato =

Brazilian actress (born 1976)

Simone Pessoa Zucato
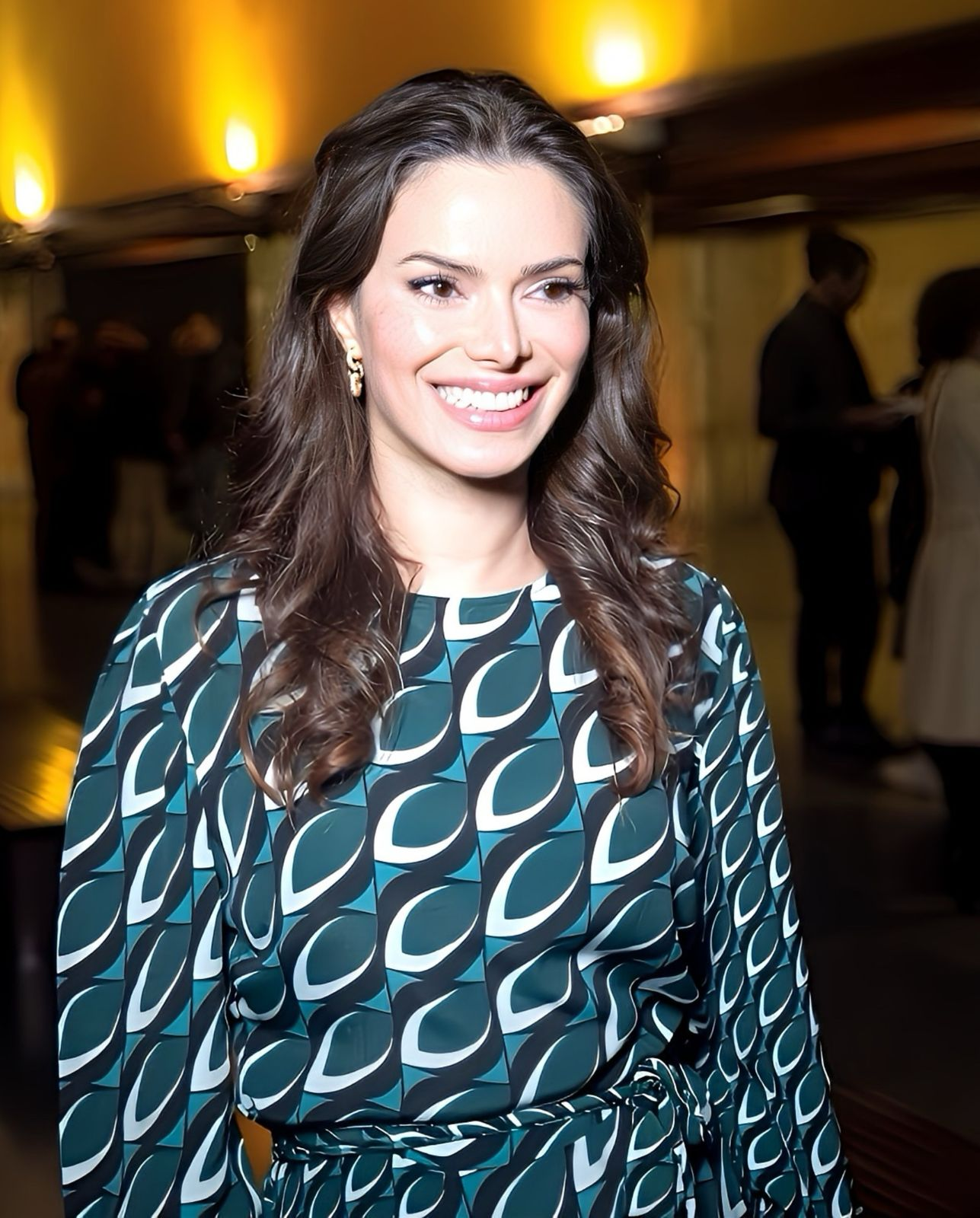
- Born: January 18, 1976 (age 49); Socorro, SP, Brazil
- Occupation: Actress
- Website: SimoneZucato.com

Simone Zucato (born January 18, 1976, in Socorro, SP, Brazil) is an actress, theater producer, translator and medical doctor.

== Biography ==
Daughter of Eurico Zucato and Sonia Regina Pessoa Zucato, Simone was born in Socorro, São Paulo, in 1976. She lived great part of her childhood in Miami, Florida. It was during her years studying that she started showing an interest in acting and began to study drama. Simone went to elementary, junior high and high schools while she lived in the United States.

When she returned to Brazil, her father did not allow her to study drama and asked her to go to medical school. Simone graduated as a medical doctor in 2003 and started studying drama and arts in Brazil in the same year. After graduating from medical school, Simone invested in the country's well-known theater schools, such as Teatro Escola Macunaíma, Escola de Atores Wolf Maya and Fundação Armando Alvares Penteado in São Paulo. In Rio de Janeiro she studied at the famous O Tablado, and participated in many courses at CAL. She was also one of eight students invited to form part of the group that attended Bárbara Heliodora's discussions about Shakespeare. Bárbara was one of Brazil's most popular and respected critics and the most important expert on Shakespeare's work in Brazil. Simone also took classes with Camila Amado, a well known and highly respected actress and acting coach in Rio de Janeiro.

Following this experience, Simone decided to hone her artistic skills in the US, where she studied with Robert Castle, from Lee Strasberg Theatre and Film Institute, Susan Batson, Jandiz Estrada, Nancy Bishop, Michelle Danner and Bernard Hiller. She also attended classes at the HB Studio, in NY.

Simone started working as an actress in 2008.

== Career ==
In 2007, she acquired her license to work as an actress in Brazil. She started her career by playing the role of Lilia, the lesbian daughter of a writer and a prejudiced actress, in the play De Corpo Presente, in 2008. In the same year, she played the role of Carol, a drug addict, in the play Inimigos do Vício, directed by Paulo Trevisan.

While she was at the theater, Simone was invited to be part of the cast of the series Casos e Acasos in the episode "A Fuga Arriscada, A Nova Namorada e O Recheio do Bolo" on Globo Television.

In the following year, she was invited to play Sonia in Cama de Gato, a soap opera written by Thelma Guedes and Duca Rachid, also on Globo. Also in 2009, Simone acquired the legal rights of Rabbit Hole, written by David Lindsay-Abaire, to be produced in Brazil.

In 2010, Simone played the role of Pietra, a ballet dancer, on another Globo soap opera, Caras e Bocas, written by Walcyr Carrasco. In the same year, she started the production of the play A Toca do Coelho, title given to Rabbit Hole in Brazil.

In 2011, she played the role of Cinira, a bitter art gallery owner, in the soap opera Corações Feridos, written by Iris Abravanel.

After that, Simone was invited to play the role of Aurora in the successful As Princesas do Castelo Encantado. Written by Ronaldo Ciambroni, this play took thousands of people, mostly children, to the theater in 2011 and 2012. In the same years (2011 and 2012), she gave life to Trair e Coçar É Só Começar's possessive and controlling Vera, written by Marcos Caruso. The play, a huge success in Brazil, has been in theaters for more than thirty years and was considered "a gift from the theater gods" by the actress.

Also in 2011, Simone was invited to play the jealous Laura, in Na Boca do Leão, title given to Love, Lies and the IRS written by Jane Milmore and Billy Van Zandt's play in Brazil. And in the same year, she also played Maria, in the play Papai Noel Existe, written by Ronaldo Ciambroni. Her passion and dedication for the theater allowed her to play four plays in a same week, over a period of months, throughout 2011.

Nowadays, Simone Zucato is seen not only on stage, but also as an active participant of the theatrical universe's backstage.

In 2013, she finally stepped on the stage, in her own production, in the role of Izzy, the funny and irresponsible sister of Becca, played by Maria Fernanda Cândido. The play starred in Teatro FAAP, in São Paulo, on September 23, 2013, and after a very successful season in São Paulo and in Rio de Janeiro in 2014, she travelled with it through thirteen Brazilian cities in 2014, coming back to São Paulo's stages for another two months season in 2015. Simone also cast actor Reynaldo Gianecchini for the role of Howie. The play took over 120,000 people to the theaters throughout Brazil.

In 2015, Zucato was invited to form part of the cast for Malhação, a soap opera, written by Rosane Svartman, on Globo Television.

Simone will also act in and produce Falling, written by Deanna Jent. The play was on the Broadway circuit in 2012, and it had its debut in Brazil in 2018. She is also the owner of the rights of the play Sylvia, written by A. R. Gurney, which she is already pre-producing and intends to star in 2019, in the same role played by Sarah Jessica Parker in the Broadway production 1995 and by Annaleigh Ashford in 2015.

Her last job on television was the Brazilian soap opera "O Sétimo Guardião", in 2018. Simone was invited to play "Liliane" by the author Aguinaldo Silva, and it was her first acting role in prime time at the Brazilian television channel, Rede Globo.

== Television ==
YEAR	TV SHOW	ROLE	COMPANY
2025	Dona de Mim	Silvana	Rede Globo
2018	O Sétimo Guardião	Liliane	Rede Globo
2016	Malhação	Producer of the "Altas Horas"	Rede Globo
2012	Corações Feridos	Cinira	SBT
2009	Caras & Bocas	Pietra	Rede Globo
2009	Cama de Gato	Sônia	Rede Globo
2008	Casos e Acasos: A Fuga Arriscada, a nova namorada e o recheio do bolo	Enfermeira	Rede Globo

== Theater ==
YEAR	PLAY	ROLE
2016	O Livro de Tatiana	Mom
2013 - 2015	A Toca do Coelho	Isabel
2012 - 2011	Trair e Coçar É Só Começar	Vera
2012 - 2011	As Princesas do Castelo Encantado	Aurora e Rapunzel
2011	Na Boca do Leão	Laura
2011	Papai Noel Existe	Clara
2008	De Corpo Presente	Lilia
2008	Inimigos do Vício	Carol
