= Belén Fraga =

- Chiquititas character
- Belén as portrayed by Argentine actress Romina Yan in the Chiquititas feature film.
- Portrayed by: Romina Yan; Ana Serradilla (Mexican version); Flávia Monteiro (Brazilian version, as Carolina Correia); Manuela do Monte (Brazilian 2013 remake, as Carolina Correia)
- Duration: 1995-1998, 2000, 2001
- First appearance: August 6, 1995
- Last appearance: July 21, 2011
- Created by: Cris Morena; Gustavo Barrios; Patricia Maldonado
In-universe information
- Occupation: Director of the Rincón de Luz orphanage; Social assistant; Psychologist (Brazil 2013 series)
- Siblings: Felipe "Piojo" Fraga; Alberto "Beto" Correia (Brazilian versions); Letícia (sister); Piojo (brother)
- Spouse: Alejo Ayala; Rian (Brasil series); Júnior (Brasil 2013 series)
- Children: Sol Fraga; Remaining Rincón de Luz's orphans Maria (Brasil series); Remaining Raio de Luz orphans (Brasil series); Dani (Brasil 2013 series); Remaining Raio de Luz orphans (Brasil 2013 series)
- Other relatives: Saverio (godfather); Chico (godfather, Brasil series); Cadu (cousin, Brasil series); Manoel (brother in law)

Belén Fraga is a fictional character from the Argentine telenovela Chiquititas, also known as Tiny Angels. The character was portrayed by Romina Yan from 1995 to 1998 on television and on stage, as well as in the Chiquititas feature film. After her storyline ended in Season Four, she had some cameos in 2000 and 2001, during the series' seasons Six and Seven. In the short-lived Mexican series, Belén was portrayed by Ana Serradilla; she is played by actress Flávia Monteiro in the Brazilian successful adaptation of the serial, in which the character is named Carolina "Carol" Correia. Actress Manuela do Monte portrays Carol in the 2013 Brazilian version of the series.

In every version of the story, the character is a young woman who gradually becomes a maternal figure for several orphans living in a manor, known as Rincón de Luz. After Belén's storyline ended, she was replaced by three different characters in Chiquititas's following seasons. Her role is taken by Ana Pizarro (Grecia Colmenares) in Season Five, Luz Liñares (Romina Gaetani) in Season Six, and Mili Urién (Agustina Cherri), a former chiquitita who returned for the show's final season.

Belén is not featured in Chiquititas Sin Fin, which plot focuses on the character of Magali "Lili" Garcia, a woman in the search for her lost son. Sin Fin is the only Chiquititas original series or season in which Belén is not featured or mentioned.

== Storyline ==
Belén Fraga in Chiquititas Season Three.

Initially, Belén lived with her best friend Clarita, her sister Letícia, her niece Sol (Daniella Mastricchio), and her younger brother Piojo (Guido Kaczka). She used to work in one of the Morán's factories with Letícia, while studying to become a social assistant. She used to visit her godfather Saverio, who was the orphanage's Chef. There, Belén acquired affection from its nine little internals, the chiquititas. She first met her boss in the factory, employer Martín Morán, and they gradually fell in love with each other. She helps him in the search for his sister Gaby's lost daughter, while they both help Mili, one of the orphans, in her search for her true identity. Martín is the first one offering Belén to the position of the orphanage's director, but the place is taken by Ginette, Ramiro's ambitious fiancée.

After Letícia dies, Belén develops a mother-and-daughter relation with Sol, since the little girl is left in sadness. Meanwhile, she and Martín found difficulty in their relationship, as his seductive secretary Dolores supposedly gets pregnant of him, what was later revealed to be a lie. Also, his father Ramiro is against the romance, since Belén is a lower-middle-class girl (for the very same reason Ramiro took Mili off Gaby, stating that the baby was stillborn, as Mili's father was of a lower class). When Sol got sick, Belén was blackmailed by Ramiro. She became unable to adopt Sol, and in order to provide the girl all the medical assistance she needed, Belén should definitely leave Martín's life, and so she did. Belén breaks up with him, and Ramiro is left confused and heartbroken. As Martín leaves Buenos Aires with Gaby, Ramiro repents and decides to tell his sons the truth about Mili. At the same time, Belén tries to stop Martín from leaving her. They both fail, as Ramiro suffers a car crash on the way, with Belén witnessing everything. Moments before his death, he tries to tell her the truth, but fails and succumbs to his injuries.

Belén and Martín were no longer together when she first met doctor Facundo Brausen (Fernán Mirás), after Jimena, one of the manor's orphans, suffered a serious accident and became paraplegic. Facundo was an impatient, surly man, who gradually changed after he meets Belén and the orphans, and because of Facundo's good actions, new children are later introduced to the Rincón de Luz manor. Belén is assisted by him, as she still suffers from Ramiro's tragic death, and still misses Martín. As time goes by, Belén sees herself in love with the doctor. After Carmen manages to close down their house, Belén receives the help of a mysterious man, and the children are given a new home. They are introduced to an enormous manor, located at the corner of the Harmony Alley. She states to the chiquititas that they are all tiny princess and princes, and the place will become their "castle".

Sol's biological father Alejo comes back, seeking for his daughter. The girl had become Belén's legal daughter, and Belén fights in court against the unscrupulous man for the girl's guard. Belén and Facundo's intense relationship is torn apart when his ex-wife Andrea, and his son Dieguito, return to his life. Andrea has a serious disease, and due to her condition, Facundo leaves Belén to take care of his family. Once again, she is left heartbroken. Alejo loses Sol's safekeeping for Belén, and apparently leaves.

Later, she meets Alejo's supposed identical twin brother, Manoel, who has moved to the Harmony Alley, where the manor is located. Belén finds out the truth about Manuel's true identity, while she needs to once again fight in court, now against Martirio, for the custody of all the orphans. Martirio is a typical hag with rogue intentions to the Rincón de Luz's internals. Belén and Alejo win in court, adopting the manor's remaining chiquititas, starting a family altogether.

Belén writes her story alongside the orphans in the Book of Life ("El Libro de La Vida"), and tells them that they now shall seek for their true happiness. She also writes about the future of each chiquitita.

=== Sightings ===
The character had some cameos after her story ended in Season Four, as a "spiritual" figure. Belén is not directly a character in Chiquititas Season Five, but Maria knows about her story due to the Book of Life, which the little girl has somehow acquired. Maria is an orphan living in the streets with her friends, until they discover an enormous granary that becomes their home. The Book is the only connection between both stories, and Maria follows Belén's messages about faith and hope, creating a new Rincón de Luz in the granary.

After the children become once again homeless, they are taken back to the Rincón de Luz manor, guided by a shooting star, in Chiquititas Season Six. There, Belén appears for them through the Magic Window ("La Ventanita de Los Sueños") in the attic, welcoming them to the Rincón de Luz, their new and definitive home, and stating that they should not give up their dreams, since they are the "greatest act to change the world".

Belén makes a last appearance on television in the series finale, in Season Seven. After the manor is destroyed by this season's villain Lidia, Mili and the chiquititas, watch the house rebuild itself, as Belén appears in the skies, as well as Mili's companions, the previous internals of the manor, appear among the orphans.

== In film ==
In the Chiquititas feature film, Belén is a young woman who lives in a world of fantasy and music, and is surprised by a tiny elf named Tok. Tok takes her to a sympathetic wise man, who offers her one of his fairy tales. She should choose a story to live in, but Belén wants to write her own. She then picks the Book of Life, also named "The Tale Of The Blue Diamonds" by the wise man. Immediately after starting to read it, Belén ends up in a small, adorable village, where she meets Alejo, a charming but rude sourdough. She follows a note in the streets about an orphanage in need of a cooker, and is taken to that place, where the orphans are actually treated as slaves by its owners, the redoubtable Colonel and his attendant. Initially, Belén is not well received by the kids, and the wise man tells her that the greatest things are always the hardest to obtain. Belén gradually starts to change their lives, easing their suffering with love and songs. She sings for Sebastian while he is grounded after trying to escape from the manor, and for Maria, Tali and Juanita, during a stormy night. Also, she helps Camila to get closer to Felipe, Alejo's assistant.

Sebastian disappears from the manor, and Belén is told by the attendant that he would not cause problems anymore. She is gagged by the chiquititas, and Belén finds Sebastian trapped inside a trunk. She decides to tell the Mayor and his whole town about the Colonel's cruelties, and does so, but he does not believe in her. The Mayor orders her to take the chiquititas back to the manor, which Belén declines in order to protect them. They escape from the village, finding refuge in Alejo's cabin. There, Alejo tells them the legend of the Blue Diamonds, and states that they are "too close", and if found, their lives would be changed forever. Agustín has a magical artefact that indicates the Diamond's location, and he follows its way alongside Fred and Sebastian. Belén and the other children notice that they're gone, and go in search of them. Belén finds the boys inside the mine, with the ambitious Colonel, who also knows the legend of the Blue Diamonds, and also looks for them. Belén is attacked by the Colonel and faints. Alejo then arrives and tries to knock him down. After his henchman misses his shot, the mine starts to collapse. When the sunlight comes through the opening above, Belén remembers the lines about the Blue Diamonds. The kids realize that the Blue Diamonds are actually Belén's eyes. The Colonel is scared, believing that she's a "witch", and tries to attack her once again, but Alejo knocks him down. The cave crumbles and everybody except Alejo manages to leave the mine. Outside, the Colonel and his Intendant are arrested. Belén and the children grieve as they think that Alejo died in the landslide, before the man emerges in the water, calling for Belén's name. Belén finally manages to change the orphan's lives forever, as she forms a family with them and Alejo. The Wiseman and Tok once again visit Belén, and she is congratulated for having a happy ending, which Belén contradicts, stating that it is her story is actually about to start.

== Replacements ==
Belén's role was taken by three different characters in Chiquititas subsequent years on television and on stage.

- Ana Pizarro, portrayed by Grecia Colmenares
  Ana is an adorable woman who arrives in the orphan's lives after her balloon falls right on Juan and Pia Maza's wedding cake. The Maza's mansion is located near the Granary where the children live, and Ana becomes their "mother", as she starts a relationship with Juan, for Pia's angry. Ana notices that the Maza children, as much as their father, are all living in grief, and gradually change their situation, making Juan a more present and better father. Ana also maintains contact with Anita, and angel in the form of a little girl nobody else is able to see. In the end, Ana and Juan get married, but they both die in an air plane crash. Pía insanely burns down the granary, and dies there. In Chiquititas Season Six, a traumatized Juanita, who was left orphan, names her doll Ana. Ana shared her maternal role with Candela (Marcela Kloosterboer), the teenage protagonist. Ana is the only adult protagonist that is not featured in the opening credits with the cast.
- Luz Liñares, portrayed by Romina Gaetani
  Luz runs away from the police and ends up in front of the Rincón de Luz manor (where the granary children had arrived days before). She's immediately recognized by Maria as their new "mother", what makes Camila jealous since this position was assumed by her. Luz then becomes the orphanage's director, but she has to struggle against the manor's occult owner, a Phantom-of-the-Opera-like figure, named Rafael Sander, and his valet Enzo. Sander is an embittered man who wants the chiquititas to leave the house he built for his son, who died in a car crash, with his wife. Enzo follows his orders and tries to expel the orphans from the manor. Also, Luz has to deal with Paula, the deceased wife's identical twin sister who always loved Sander and wants the manor for her. Luz and Sander fall in love for each other and end up getting married, after he leaves his angry, in a magical ceremony with the orphans as guests. The Rincón de Luz manor is given from Sander to Luz as a gift, as he states that, in the past, it was a home for children. She completes, saying that "now, the history repeats itself". She leaves with Sander and Juanita in search of his lost son, who was supposedly still alive, and the manor and its orphans are left in Enzo's care.
- Mili Urién, portrayed by Agustina Cherri
  Mili lived in the Rincón de Luz manor in the past, being the reason the orphanage was raised. Mili left the story after being reunited to her mother, and comes back after she dies. The girl finds a place ruled by an ambitious woman, Lidia, sent by the Juvenile Court to be its newest director, in Luz and Sander's absence. Also, the Magic Window is closed. Mili decides to assume a new identity, in order to get in the orphanage and change the orphan's current situation. She appears as Greta, a rigorous supervisor. As Mili, she works in a nearby bar, where she meets its owner Ramiro, and falls in love for him. When Mili discovers Lidia's true intentions, she decides to reveal her identity for the orphans. The kids do not believe in her, except Maria, who recognizes her from the Book of Life's writings. Lidia tries to send the children back to the Shadow reformatory, and finds out Mili's real plans. Mili is left tied in the attic, desperate and unsure about what happened to the orphans. After they escape Lidia's trap, she is arrested due to her abuses, but the cruel woman still manages to destroy the manor. Mili and the chiquititas watch Rincón de Luz magically rebuilds itself, as the spirit of Belén is seen in the skies.

== Other versions ==
=== Chiquititas Brasil ===
Carolina "Carol" Correia in Chiquititas Brasil's fifth and final season, portrayed by Flávia Monteiro.

The character is named Carolina, fondly known as Carol by the orphans. She follows the same story of Belén with some alterations. Carol works at the Pureza factory, which belongs to the Almeida Campos, and first meets Júnior there. Their relationship is destroyed by his father's constant blackmails, and Júnior decides to leave Carol with his sister Gabi, who is mentally ill. The character of Sol was adapted into two different ones in this version, Dani and Maria. Carol allowed Dani to live with her father, and found Maria in the streets, taking her to the Raio de Luz manor and developing an intense mother-and-daughter relationship with the little girl. She met doctor Fernando Brausen and they eventually fell in love for each other, until his ex-wife Andréia reappeared in his life. Fernando's little son Diego wanted his family reunited and asked his father to take care of Andréia (as she is sick) first, and then live with Carol afterwards. As Fernando leaves with his family, Carol is left heartbroken. However, she reassures Maria and the other the saddened orphans stating that, even though sadness is part of life, they must be strong enough to never let themselves to be knocked down by sorrow. Carol uncovers the truth about Mili's past, revealing it to Gabriela. Days before Christmas, she reunites the orphans and tells them her story. Carol fondly remembers Mili with a picture of her, after she leaves with Gabriela at Christmas night. Carol fights for Maria's custody against Felipe Mendes. After she wins on court, Felipe assumes the identity of Manuel, to stay closer to both Maria and Carol, for whom he has fallen in love. While decorating a party for the kids, Carol falls from the portable stair. Helena, an evil woman who hated her and the orphans, hypnotizes Carol and makes her unable to walk. Carol becomes desperate, but "Manuel"'s love releases Carol from her sudden paralysis, and she stands up again. Carol falls for "Manuel" and the couple become engaged, but their relationship is torn apart after she discovers his truth, at the day of their wedding. In the end of Season Four, Carol forgives him and friendly allows Maria to live with Felipe. Carol is invited to promote the institution's activities and becomes unsettled between accepting it or not. She chooses to go after the orphans encourage her, as they want every children in need to have a mother like her. At New Year's Eve, Carol gives the Book of Life to the orphans as a gift, and says goodbye to them. At their farewell, Pata and Mosca tell Carol that she is their "guiding shine", which they will be waiting to return.

However, they are forced to leave the house, and move on to an inland granary (taken by Estrela and Alfredo the Chef). After arriving there, the children discover that Carol had supposedly died in an airplane crash, and are left desperate under the supposed death of theirmother. However, the woman literally falls from the sky, right on Rian and Cora's wedding cake with her balloon. After her return, Carol settles in the granary, alongside Estrela, her adorable grandfather Tonico and, once again, she is reunited with her chiquititas. The granary then becomes their newest home, Raio de Luz, and a new orphanage.

Rian is the owner of a mansion located nearby the granary, and Cora is his fiancée. As Rian gradually falls for Carol (and vice versa), Cora is left angry, committing illicit acts to take Carol and the orphans away from her life. She almost makes Carol to be arrested, which is prevented by Rian. In the end, she's caught in act by the police. Carol and Rian are finally free to get married, and after doing so, they adopt the remaining chiquititas.

==== 2013 version ====
Carol as portrayed by actress Manuela do Monte in the 2013 Brazilian version of Chiquititas.

Actress Manuela do Monte portrays Carol in the 2013 Brazilian adaptation of the story. Carol is a Psychology academic and works as a waitress at the Café Boutique, which belongs to Júnior's wealthy family, the Almeida Campos. At the Café, she first meets Júnior and four street children, Pata, Mosca, Binho and Rafa. Carol briefly welcomes them in her own house. The kids are introduced to the Almeida Campos' institution, the Raio de Luz manor, under her intervention. Pata is admitted but Binho, Mosca and Rafa are left out, since boys are not allowed at the place. It is after Carol convinces Sofia, the house admin, to receive them that the two become part of the manor. Sofia becomes interested in Carol's delicacy and psychologist skills and invites herself to work with them. At the manor, she is "tested" by the chiquititas to prove she's not as rigorous as Ernestina and meets Chico, their chef. Sofia eventually grows tired and unable of keeping Mili's secret and becomes sick, asking Carol to assume her place as a mother to the orphans if she dies, which Carol promises. Carol eventually becomes fond for the chiquititas, particularly with Mili, with whom Carol becomes best friends. As a romance grows between Carol and Júnior and they engage, his father José Ricardo and his aunt Carmem are left annoyed that he is dating a lower-class woman, to the point Carmem orders Carol to leave the manor, saddening the chiquititas who start a hunger strike in protest. José Ricardo also blackmails Carol to take Dani, the little daughter of her best friend Letícia who recently died, away from her. Carol tries to run away with Dani, but fails and succumbs to José Ricardo's blackmail, breaking up with Júnior and meeting the charming medical doctor Fernando, neighbor of the manor. Before an ill, redeemed José Ricardo dies of heart failure, he formally nominates Carol as the manor's new admin, for Carmem's anger and the chiquititas' rejoice. Carol then grows as a mother to the orphans, giving them enough care such as advising Mili when she has her first period, helping an overweighted Rafa to improve his health and making him, Binho and Mosca show interest for their school obligations. She eventually manages to place Dani at the orphanage, and later finds Maria, a little, shy and quiet girl in the streets, making the manor her home as well.

Carol and Júnior's on and off relationship continues as Carol becomes torn between Júnior and Fernando, finally choosing Júnior, and up to the point she needs to face his ex-girlfriend Andréia, who comes back from London bringing Júnior's supposed son Diego with her. Carmem eventually manages to get Carol fired from her position by accusing her of stealing from the institution's budget, putting Cíntia (José Ricardo's unscrupulous "girlfriend" who ran away after her true intentions were uncovered) back in her place, so they can find an assumed treasure, hidden inside the old Raio de Luz manor. Carol and Júnior eventually discover the truth behind Mili's origins, and Carol reunites the girl and her fellow chiquititas to tell them her story. In the end, Carol and Júnior get married, she reassumes her position in the Raio de Luz manor and gives birth to a son.

=== Chiquititas México ===
As the Mexican version of the show has only one season adapted, Belén's storyline was the very same except for the series finale, where she ends up with Martín Morán.
