= Miguel Ângelo (actor) =

Brazilian actor

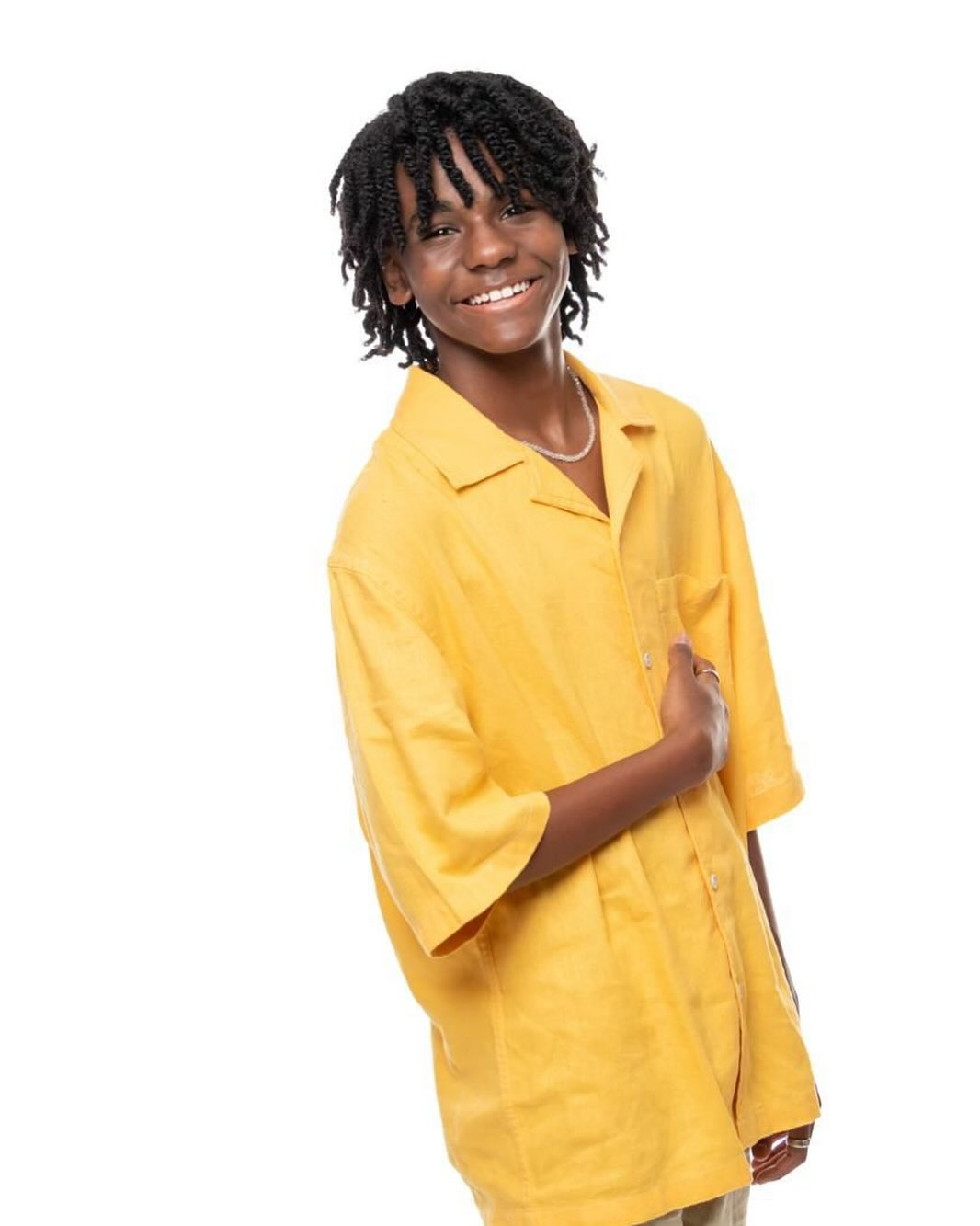
- Miguel Ângelo in 2023
- Born: Miguel Ângelo da Silva Cardoso; February 16, 2011 (age 15); Rio de Janeiro, Brazil
- Occupation: Actor
- Years active: 2014–present

Miguel Ângelo da Silva Cardoso (born February 16, 2011) is a Brazilian child actor who gained prominence for his role as Romeu Monteiro in the telenovela A Infância de Romeu e Julieta, broadcast by SBT and Prime Video.

== Early life ==
Miguel Ângelo was born in the Cidade de Deus neighborhood, a favela in Rio de Janeiro, Brazil. He moved to São Paulo with his mother, Vânia Regina da Silva, to pursue his acting career. He began his artistic journey at the age of three, participating in the Globo series O Caçador.

== Career ==
In 2018, Miguel Ângelo appeared in the short film O Nosso Legado, which was screened by the United Nations in New York City. He has also performed in theater productions such as The Wizard of Oz and Love as Revolution.

In 2023, he gained national recognition by portraying Romeu Monteiro in the telenovela A Infância de Romeu e Julieta, inspired by William Shakespeare's work. The series, directed by Ricardo Mantoanelli and written by Íris Abravanel, is a partnership between SBT and Prime Video.

== Personal life ==
Miguel Ângelo is an advocate for representation in Brazilian drama. He serves as an inspiration for other children from peripheral communities, showing that it is possible to achieve dreams despite adversity.

== Filmography ==
=== Television ===
Year	Title	Role	Ref.
2023–24	A Infância de Romeu e Julieta	Romeu Monteiro	

=== Theater ===
Title	Ref.
The Wizard of Oz	
Love as Revolution
