= Socorro, São Paulo =

Socorro
- Municipality
- Municipality of the Hydromineral Spa of Socorro
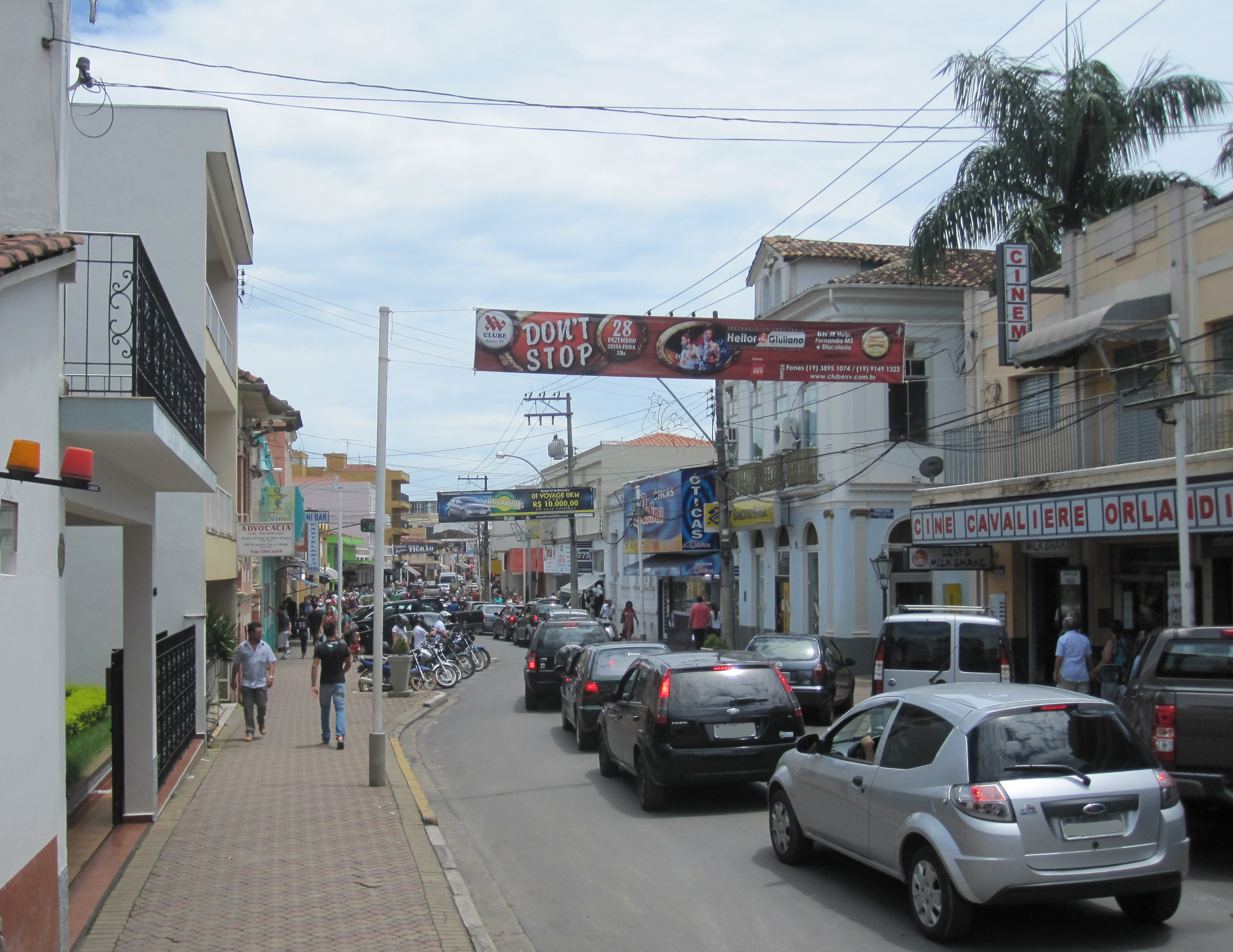
- A street in downtown Socorro

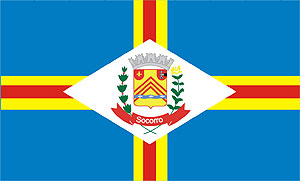
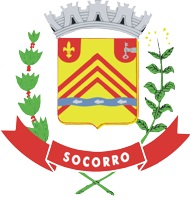
- Flag Coat of arms

- Location in the state of São Paulo

- Location within Brazil
- Coordinates: 22°35′29″S 46°31′44″W
- Country: Brazil
- Region: Southeast
- State: São Paulo
- Founded: August 9, 1829
- Incorporated: March 17, 1883

Government
  - Mayor: Andre Bozola (PTB)

Area
  - Total: 448.074 km^{2} (173.002 sq mi)
- Elevation: 752 m (2,467 ft)

Population (2020)
  - Total: 41,352
  - Density: 92.288/km^{2} (239.03/sq mi)
  - Demonym: Socorrense
- Time zone: UTC−3 (BRT)
- Postal Code: 13960-000
- Area code: 19
- HDI (2000): 0.812 –high
- Website: Socorro City Hall

Socorro is a municipality in the state of São Paulo in Brazil. The city is located on the "do Peixe" River and in Mantiqueira Mountains, bordering the state of Minas Gerais to the north and east. Currently, the city's economy is based in the sector of clothing (knitting), ecotourism and adventure sports.

== History ==
=== Foundation ===
Socorro was settled in 1738 by Simão Toledo Piza, after the local indigenous people (Carajás) left the place due to the Bandeirantes incursions. At that time, it was known as Campanha de Toledo (Toledo's Campaign), it belonged to the then-called Sertão de Bragança (Bragança's Countryside) and it had a population of 922. In 1839, a chapel in honor of Our Lady of Perpetual Help was built in the place where today is located the Main Church of the city. The first mass was conducted on August 9, the birthday of the municipality. However, it wasn't until 1883 that it had really become a municipality. In 1889, it became a comarca. In 1945, Fernando Costa, then governor of São Paulo, elevated it to the condition of "Estância Sanitária".

=== Coffee and Italian immigration ===
Since the 19th century, the city is an important coffee producer. When the slavery was brought down and the so-called Old Republic begun, Italian immigrants arrived in São Paulo to replace the now-free slaves in the coffee farms. The farmers from São Paulo wanted a railway to more efficiently take their coffee to the ports. As the construction of railways connecting the coast to the countryside started, the Companhia Mogyana de Estradas de Ferro was created, having its first train station inaugurated on March 18, 1872, in Campinas.

On April 21, 1909, the Socorro section was built, and the city began to develop faster. In 1929, with the 1929 great crash and the subsequent depression, many coffee farmers saw their productions decreasing, which led most to bankruptcy. As such, many Italians had the opportunity of buying land for a cheap price.

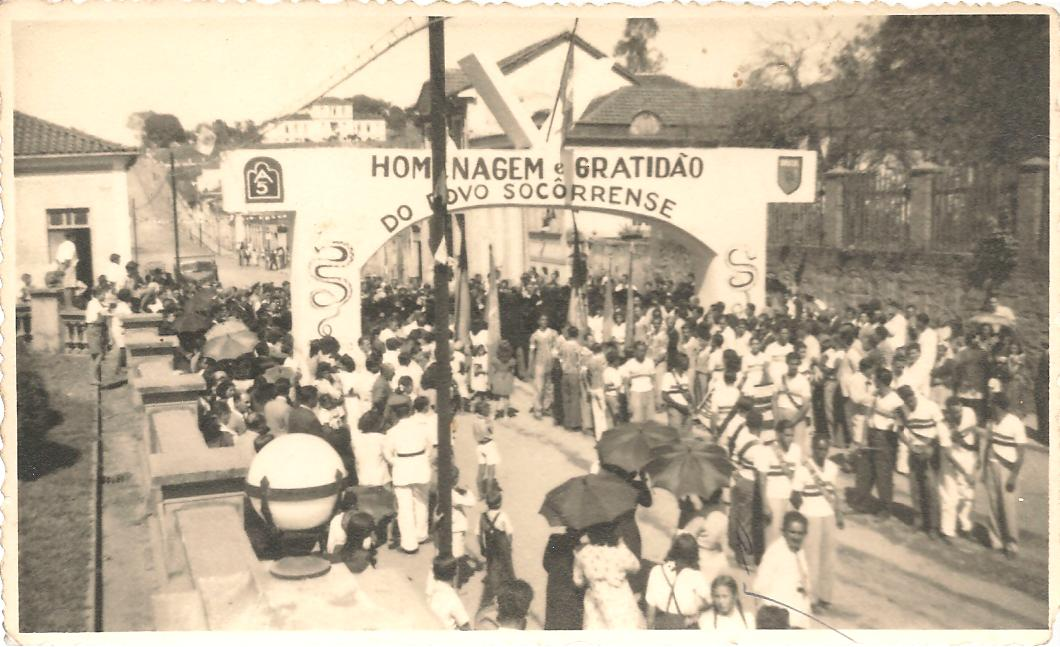
The so-called "Pracinhas" arrive at Socorro on August 14, 1945.

In 1945, the city was visited by the "Pracinhas" – members of the Brazilian Expeditionary Force, which battled in Italy during the Second World War.

In 1978, Socorro was given the status of "Estância Turística" and regained its political rights, allowing its population to elect its mayors.

=== Investments in Tourism ===
In 2004, restaurants, hotels, theaters and other services were given four years to fully adapt their buildings for disabled people. It was part of the project Socorro Acessível. Since 2005, Socorro takes part of Adventure Sport Fair and, in 2005, the Ministry of tourism of Brazil spoke about accessibility in this fair. The adventure sports was the most difficult part, since the creation of appropriate equipments would be also required, apart from ramps, wheelchairs and altered toilets. As the ministry, local NGOs and companies and the city hall joined forces, the studies required for such adaptations were conducted.

== Geography ==
The city is mountainous and crossed by many rivers, the main ones being Do Peixe, Camanducaia and das Antas.

=== Climate ===
According to the Köppen climate classification Socorro has a humid subtropical climate.

Climate data for Socorro
Month	Jan	Feb	Mar	Apr	May	Jun	Jul	Aug	Sep	Oct	Nov	Dec	Year
Mean daily maximum °C (°F)	28.7 (83.7)	28.7 (83.7)	28.4 (83.1)	26.7 (80.1)	24.9 (76.8)	23.8 (74.8)	24.0 (75.2)	26.0 (78.8)	27.1 (80.8)	27.5 (81.5)	28.0 (82.4)	27.9 (82.2)	26.8 (80.2)
Daily mean °C (°F)	23.2 (73.8)	23.3 (73.9)	22.8 (73.0)	20.6 (69.1)	18.3 (64.9)	17.0 (62.6)	16.9 (62.4)	18.6 (65.5)	20.1 (68.2)	21.2 (70.2)	21.9 (71.4)	22.5 (72.5)	20.5 (68.9)
Mean daily minimum °C (°F)	17.7 (63.9)	17.9 (64.2)	17.1 (62.8)	14.5 (58.1)	11.8 (53.2)	10.3 (50.5)	9.8 (49.6)	11.1 (52.0)	13.1 (55.6)	14.9 (58.8)	15.7 (60.3)	17.0 (62.6)	14.2 (57.6)
Average precipitation mm (inches)	266.2 (10.48)	223.0 (8.78)	173.8 (6.84)	80.4 (3.17)	64.6 (2.54)	47.6 (1.87)	29.3 (1.15)	37.2 (1.46)	73.1 (2.88)	133.2 (5.24)	154.8 (6.09)	254.7 (10.03)	1,537.9 (60.55)
Source: Centro de Pesquisas Meteorológicas e Climáticas Aplicadas à Agricultura

== Economy ==
The city's economy relies mainly on services such as tourism, commerce, etc. (45%), industry (35%) and agriculture (20%)

=== Tourism ===
The city attracts tourists specially because of its extreme sports facilities and parks located on its outskirts. There, it is possible to practice:

- Haka Race, a competition involving sports such as Rafting, long-duration hiking, cycle-tourism, zipline and others;
- Acqua-ride and Boia Cross; to ride a rapid in inflatable buoy;
- Canoeing;
- Rafting;
- Rappelling;
- Zipline;
- Climbing;
- Quadcycling;
- Free flight and paragliding.
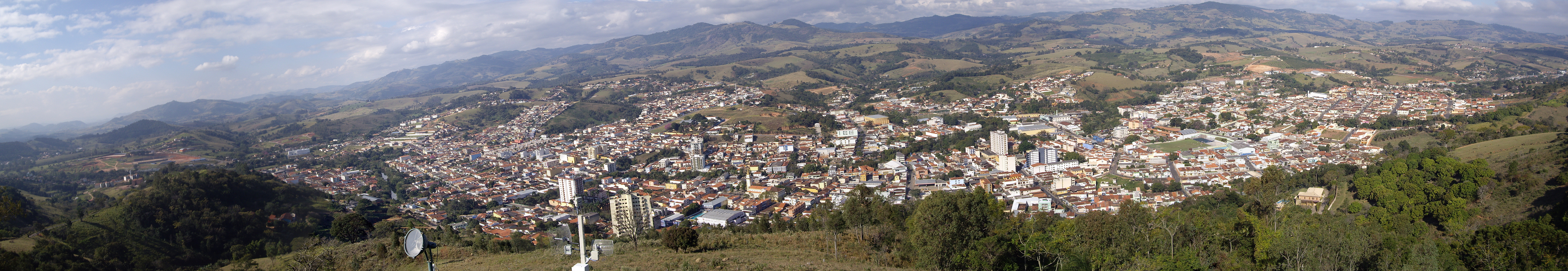
View of the city from the Christ's Hill belvedere.

== Media ==
In telecommunications, the city was served by Companhia Telefônica Brasileira until 1973, when it began to be served by Telecomunicações de São Paulo. In July 1998, this company was acquired by Telefónica, which adopted the Vivo brand in 2012.

The company is currently an operator of cell phones, fixed lines, internet (fiber optics/4G) and television (satellite and cable).

== See also ==
- List of municipalities in São Paulo
