= +SBT =

Brazilian free streaming platform

- Website type: OTT streaming platform
- Available in: Portuguese
- Predecessor: SBT Vídeos (2020–2024)
- Headquarters: Osasco, São Paulo, Brazil
- Area served: Brazil
- Owner: Grupo Silvio Santos
- Products: Streaming media; Video on demand; FAST channels
- Parent: SBT
- Website: mais.sbt.com.br
- Launched: 3 April 2020; 6 years ago (as SBT Vídeos); 19 August 2024; 2 years ago (as +SBT)
- Current status: Active

+SBT (pronounced "Mais SBT"), stylized as +sbt, is a Brazilian free streaming platform owned by Grupo Silvio Santos and operated by SBT. It was launched as SBT Vídeos on 3 April 2020 and rebranded to its current name on 19 August 2024.

The platform provides access to content from SBT, including telenovelas, films, series, news programs and live broadcasts of the television channel. It is available on mobile devices and smart TVs.

== History ==
=== SBT Vídeos (2020–2024) ===
SBT Vídeos was launched on 3 April 2020 as a free video-on-demand service requiring user registration.

In September 2020, the platform began broadcasting Copa Libertadores matches. From 2023, it carried Copa Sudamericana games, including alternative broadcasts featuring Diguinho Coruja.

In 2021, SBT established a partnership with A2 Filmes to expand its catalogue with films, series and animated content. The platform also began offering full episodes of Mexican telenovelas shortly after their television broadcast.

On 7 August 2023, the platform launched TV Zyn, a FAST channel aimed at younger audiences, in partnership with Amagi and AD Digital.

=== +SBT (2024–present) ===
On 14 November 2023, SBT announced the rebranding of the platform as +SBT, with a planned launch in 2024.

A beta version was released to employees on 8 April 2024. The service became available to the public in June 2024, initially on Android devices and Samsung Smart TVs, followed by iOS devices later that month.

On 1 July 2024, the platform released O Picapau Amarelo, described in sources as its first original production.

The official launch was scheduled for 18 August 2024 but was postponed to 19 August following the death of Silvio Santos, founder of SBT.

In February 2025, the platform restructured its FAST channels, retaining a reduced number of channels including +Silvio Santos, +Pop, +Saudade, +TVZYN and +Novelas.

In May 2025, additional changes were implemented, including the discontinuation of some channels and renaming of others.

== FAST channels ==
The platform includes free ad-supported streaming television (FAST) channels.

FAST channel	Description
+SBT Novelas	Broadcasts telenovelas previously aired by SBT
SBT Kids	Children's programming, including series and animated content
+SBT Raiz	Broadcasts archival programming, including shows associated with Silvio Santos
SBT News	Live broadcasts, including news channel
