= Miguel Ângelo (footballer, born 1970) =

Portuguese football coach and former player

Personal information
- Full name: Miguel Ângelo Silva Duarte Oliveira Pinto
- Date of birth: 5 January 1970 (age 56)
- Place of birth: São João da Madeira, Portugal
- Height: 1.75 m (5 ft 9 in)
- Position: Midfielder

Youth career
- 1986–1989: Sanjoanense

Senior career*
Years	Team	Apps	(Gls)
1989–1991	Sanjoanense	10	(0)
1991–1992	Fiães		
1992–1995	Sanjoanense		
1995–1997	Feirense	50	(1)
1997–2000	Beira-Mar	51	(0)
2000–2002	Sanjoanense	20	(1)
2002–2003	Arrifanense		

Managerial career
- 2010–2012: Sanjoanense (U-17)
- 2012–2013: Sanjoanense AC (U-17)
- * Club domestic league appearances and goals

Miguel Ângelo Silva Duarte Oliveira Pinto, known as Miguel Ângelo (born 5 January 1970) is a Portuguese football coach and a former player.

== Club career ==
He made his Primeira Liga debut for Beira-Mar on 29 August 1998 in a game against Porto.

== Honours ==
Beira-Mar

- Taça de Portugal: 1998–99
