= A Infância de Romeu e Julieta =

2023 Brazilian TV series or program

- Genre: Children's telenovela; Romance; Fantasy
- Created by: Íris Abravanel
- Based on: Romeo and Juliet by William Shakespeare
- Written by: Denise Barbosa; Danilo Castro; Fernando Pripas; Grace Iwashita; Gustavo Braga; Marcela Arantes; Fany Higuera
- Directed by: Rica Mantoanelli
- Starring: List: Vittória Seixas; Miguel Ângelo; Juliana Schalch; João Baldasserini; Bianca Rinaldi; Karin Hils; Ciro Sales; Matheus Ueta; Lu Grimaldi; André Mattos; Lucas Salles; Thamiris Mandú; (See more)
- Opening theme: "Lado a Lado", Carol Navarro, Fred Benuce and Loro Roth
- Country of origin: Brazil
- Original language: Portuguese
- No. of episodes: 335

Production
- Production locations: CDT da Anhanguera, Osasco, Brazil
- Editor: Andréia Bernardo; Aquiléia Nobre; Clayton Vianna; Deborah Duré; Hermenegildo R. Junior; Renata Miranda
- Camera setup: Multi-camera
- Running time: 45 minutes
- Production companies: SBT; Amazon

Original release
- Network: SBT; Prime Video
- Release: 8 May 2023 – 19 August 2024

A Infância de Romeu e Julieta is a Brazilian telenovela created by Íris Abravanel, produced and broadcast by SBT and in partnership with Amazon Prime Video from May 8, 2023, and August 19, 2024. It is based on the tragedy Romeo and Juliet, written by William Shakespeare.

== Plot ==
The plot takes place in a neighborhood called Castanheiras, where two families with different proposals for the neighborhood live in discord, divided between the Torre (Monteiro) and Vila (Campos) sides. However, Romeu (Miguel Ângelo) and Julieta (Vittória Seixas) meet, and from then on, the rival families have a new opportunity to bring peace and unity between them.

Well known in the neighborhood, Julieta Campos is an adventurous and cool girl who skateboards around the area. She is the granddaughter of the respected Hélio Campos (Luiz Guilherme), a renowned coach who runs the region's sports center, CEC. She also lives with her grandmother and confidant, Clara Campos (Lu Grimaldi). Meanwhile, Romeu Monteiro has been encouraged by his parents, Vera Monteiro (Bianca Rinaldi) and Bernardo Monteiro (Fábio Ventura), since he was little to play tennis and has the best teacher to give him lessons in the condominium. But he does not have the same passion for solitary sports and ends up preferring collective ones, where he can play and have fun with friends. Romeu also lives with Gláucia Monteiro (Karin Hils), his aunt and Bernardo's sister, a woman of dubious origin who uses her tricks to achieve some prestige.

Twelve years ago, due to a mistake, Julieta's mother was unjustly arrested thanks to the Monteiros, who believe that she kidnapped Romeo when he was still a baby, in addition to being accused of stealing a jewel from Vera, who was with Gláucia. When they discover the problem from the past, Romeo and Juliet do not know how they will manage to stay together in the face of the rivalry between the families. News of the romance also reaches the families, who do not like the story at all and try to separate them immediately, causing various situations. Romeu and Julieta want to put an end to this hostility and try to find a solution. However, when they discover more situations involving the rivalry between the families, they realize that this may be a difficult mission, but not impossible.

Among the parallel plots, there is a similar little group, which is composed of Ian (Miguel Soares), a boy who usually uses his imagination a lot and lives with Leon (Matheus Ueta), his imaginary best friend who wears a lion costume and is only seen by Ian, who is also considered "crazy" by other characters, Nath (Arlyane Carvalho), a nice girl who, together with Ellen (Bella Alelaf), her best friend, try to find a place to play and Dimitri (Samuel Estevam), a boy who is not afraid of anything and likes to help people, facing the Pedalzeiras, a group of cyclists composed of Muke (Gabriel Miller), Trapaça (Zaira Harue), Fê Dengosa (Antonella Dez) and Chilique (Miguel Trajano), whose objective is to dominate the park by inserting their stickers on the toys to ride bicycles and threatening anyone who crosses their territory, prohibiting the children of Castanheiras from having fun. Dimitri was initially a member of the group, leaving it after thinking better about his actions and joining Ian, Nath and Ellen, forming a group called Extraordinaries. The Extraordinaries often enter the World of Imagination, where they complete the Golden Path of the Seven Missions and enter the Great Door, behind this door, there is a bookshelf, where Faustinho must return five books.

== Cast ==
Actor/Actress	Character
Vittória Seixas	Julieta Campos Matos (Juli)
Miguel Ângelo	Romeu Monteiro (Rô) / Rômulo Castro
Juliana Schalch	Mariana Campos Matos
Bianca Rinaldi	Vera Monteiro
Lu Grimaldi	Clara Bernardi Campos
Luiz Guilherme	Hélio Campos
Karin Hils	Gláucia Monteiro Bastos
André Mattos	Fausto Guerra
Fábio Ventura	Bernardo Monteiro
Guilherme Sant’anna	Leandro Monteiro
João Baldasserini	Daniel Matos
Ciro Sales	Vitor Campos
Vivi Lucas	Lívia Gaspar
Gianlucca Mauad	Alex Ferrari
Jolie	Karen Gaspar
Vinícius Pieri	Patrick Santana
Bárbara Cruz	Rosalina Hartmann
Miguel Schmid	Téo Pinheiro Monteiro
Yasmin Prado	Sofia
Lucas Salles	Bassânio de Jesus
Lucas Salles	Basílio de Jesus
Lis Luciddi	Telma Gaspar
Felipe Roque	Mauro Ferrari
Velson D’Souza	Frederico Bastos (Fred)
Beatriz Oliveira	Pórcia Guerra
Lincoln Tornado	Enzo Ribeiro
Thamiris Mandú	Amanda Pinheiro Ribeiro
Lukas Cabral	Fernando Monteiro Bastos (Nando)
Samuel Estevam	Dimitri Monteiro Bastos (Crânio)
Miguel Soares	Ian Ferrari
Arlyane Carvalho	Nathália Pinheiro (Nath)
Bella Alelaf	Ellen Gaspar
Gabriel Miller	Muke
Matheus Ueta	Leon
Zaira Harue	Trapaça / Isabel Gomes Saito
Antonella Dez	Fê Dengosa (Fedê) / Alice
Miguel Trajano	Chilique / Samuel
Rayssa Zago	Domitila Rigatoni
Guilherme Faria	Mini
Christiana Ubach	Laura
Felipe Costa	Diego Santana

=== Special appearances ===
Actor/Actress	Character
Lilian Blanc	Branca Delfino
Glauce Graieb	Senhora pedestre
Arlete Montenegro	Aparecida R. Gomes (Lost lady)
Duda Pimenta	Kessya Soares
Henrique Stroeter	Cláudio
Lana Rhoades	Catarina
Adriana Alves	Adelaide
Nill Marcondes	Nilton
Naiumi Goldoni	Repórter
Anderson Tomazini	Simão Garcia
Luciano Chirolli	Adriel Príncipe
Gui Ventura	Daren Príncipe
Giovanna Chaves	Herself
Gabriel Muglia	Luciano, the detective
Danilo Dal Farra	Francis
Lucas Leal	Pedro, the delivery man
Virgínia Rosa	Onete Ribeiro
William Ribeiro	Carlos Maurício
Clarinha Larchete	Luana
Daniel Nini	Nino
João Lucas Takaki	Paulo
Taiguara Nazareth	James Wills
	Gabi
Milena Sayuri Kadena	Trapaça's Cousin
Melina Menghini	Trapaça's Mom
	Mulher Misteriosa
	João
Fernando Cavalcante	Victor Magalhães
Letícia Bufoni	Herself
	Luís
	Ricardo
	Robson
	Carlos Marcondes
	Juliano Juju
	Flávia Monteiro
	Karen's Dad, Lívia e Ellen (Plínio)
	Romeu (Baby)
	Julieta (Baby)
Sophia Rosa	Flávia (Children)
Júnior Dmais	Fausto (Children)
Mariana O'Donovan	Clara (Children)
Pedro Pires	Hélio (Children)
Victor Daniel	Leandro (Children)
Bernardo Soares	Ian (Minor)

== Production ==
The plot is an adaptation of the original work by William Shakespeare, but without the main tragedy of the story. The soap opera has artistic direction by Fernando Pelegio. In addition, it is the broadcaster's first project in partnership with Amazon Prime Video.

=== Casting ===
The first names confirmed for the telenovela were Bianca Rinaldi and João Baldasserini. In the case of the former, the telenovela marks her return to SBT, since her last work on the channel was a special appearance on the sitcom Meu Cunhado (2004). After this work, Bianca went on to star in several telenovelas on Record until 2013, even becoming one of the highest earners on the channel, when she returned to TV Globo (where she began her career as a paquita in 1990, in addition to having made a special appearance on Malhação 1997), remaining on the channel until 2018. The second participates in his first production outside of TV Globo after working on several projects at the station, one of which was Salve-se Quem Puder (2020), where he was one of the protagonists. The plot also marks Felipe Roque's debut at SBT, after his stints at Globo and Record.

Casting auditions began in July 2022. The first names were officially announced on October 31, confirming newcomers Miguel Ângelo and Vittória Seixas as the story's protagonists. This will also be SBT's first telenovela in which a protagonist is black, since in Carrossel (2012), the character Cirilo Riveira (Jean Paulo Campos) was a co-protagonist. Also selected for the cast were singer and actress Karin Hils, who returns to SBT after participating in the adaptation of Carinha de Anjo (2016) and actor Matheus Ueta, who returns to telenovelas eleven years after playing Kokimoto Mishima in Carrossel.

== Broadcast ==
The soap opera was initially scheduled to premiere in April 2023 on Prime Video and in May on SBT. As filming progresses, the new premiere date is now set for April on open TV and streaming. Soon after, the premiere date was confirmed for May 8, 2023 on SBT, at 8:45 pm. The soap opera also premieres on streaming on the same day, but with the first five chapters available to subscribers. The plot also has five weekly chapters available on Fridays, with the model adopted on the 12th of the same month.

The first teasers aired on February 26, 2023, during the breaks of Domingo Legal.

== Podcast ==
Queijo com Goiabada is a podcast of interviews with the cast and members of the production of the soap opera, presented by Ana Zimerman and Nicholas Torres. The episodes are posted on TV ZYN's official YouTube channel in a premiere format on Tuesdays right after the telenovela's chapter is shown. The first episode interviewed Vittória Seixas and aired on May 9, 2023, one day after the show's premiere.

== Soundtrack ==
=== A Infância de Romeu e Julieta ===
A Infância de Romeu e Julieta

Soundtrack album by Various artists
- Released: June 12, 2023
- Genre: Soundtrack
- Length: 42:39
- Language: Portuguese
- Labels: SBT Music; Building Records

Various artists chronology
A Infância de Romeu e Julieta	A Infância de Romeu e Julieta, Vol. 2

Track listing

No.	Title	Writer(s)	Artist(s)	Length
1.	"Lado a Lado" (Opening theme)	Carol Navarro; Fred Benuce; Loro Ruth	Carol Navarro, Fred Benuce and Thomas Roth	02:01
2.	"Foi Assim"	Thomas Roth; Teco Fuchs	Vittória Seixas and Heitor Teixeira	02:34
3.	"Menina Borboleta"	Thomas Roth	Luciano Tiso	02:34
4.	"Pedalzera"	Fred Benuce; Thomas Roth	Fred Benuce	02:14
5.	"Pré-Adolescência"	Gaby Roth; Fred Benuce	Dudu Botosso	02:47
6.	"Família"	Thomas Roth; Vanessa Bumagny	Mary Dandrea	03:07
7.	"Infância"	Gaby Roth; Fred Benuce	Loro Roth	02:01
8.	"O Amor nos Encontrou"	Mari Campolongo; Zé Henrique; Jonathas Pingo; Ana Léia	Mari Campolongo	03:17
9.	"Lado Vila" (Ska version)	Thomas Ruth; Léo Ramos	Lucas Burgatti	03:20
10.	"Pra Sempre"	Thomas Ruth	Vittória Seixas and Guilherme Martinez	03:20
11.	"Turma do Bem"	Thomas Roth; Gaby Roth	Thomas Roth, Carol Navarro and Isa Salles	02:56
12.	"Lado Torre"	Léo Ramos; Thomas Roth	Léo Ramos	02:18
13.	"Hino Cec"	Thomas Roth; Josias Damasceno	Thomas Roth Isa Salles and Carol Navarro	02:25
14.	"Lá do Alto da Torre"	Léo Ramos; Thomas Roth	Léo Ramos and Isa Salles	03:17
15.	"Foi Assim" (Bonus Track – Romeu)	Thomas Roth; Teco Fuchs	Heitor Teixeira	02:34
16.	"Foi Assim" (Bonus Track – Julieta)	Thomas Roth; Teco Fuchs	Vittória Seixas	02:34
Total length:				42:39

=== A Infância de Romeu e Julieta, Vol. 2 ===
A Infância de Romeu e Julieta, Vol. 2

Soundtrack album by Various artists
- Released: November 17, 2023
- Genre: Soundtrack
- Length: 45:27
- Language: Portuguese
- Labels: SBT Music; Building Records

Various artists chronology
A Infância de Romeu e Julieta	A Infância de Romeu e Julieta, Vol. 2

Track listing

No.	Title	Writer(s)	Artist(s)	Length
1.	"Nath"	Thomas Roth	Bianca Lua	02:02
2.	"Casais"	Thomas Roth	Adriana Drê and Fernando Forni	02:12
3.	"Patrick"	Gaby Roth; Thomas Roth	Teco Fuchs	02:46
4.	"Bassânio"	Thomas Roth	Josias Damasceno	02:56
5.	"Forte Frágil"	Thomas Roth	Fernando Forni	02:46
6.	"Clara"	Thomas Roth; Paulo Vaz	Carol Navarro	02:11
7.	"Superstar"	Thomas Roth; Fred Benuce	Carol Navarro	03:25
8.	"Todo Dia"	Nathan Naccarato Szwarcberg	Nathan Naccarato Szwarcberg	03:17
9.	"Trufa"	Fred Benuce; Gaby Roth	Thomas Roth	01:48
10.	"Eu Sou Incrível"	Iza Molinari; Edu Filgueira	Iza Molinari	02:24
11.	"Moleque Bonito"	Iza Molinari; Xerife; Cibelle Hespanhol	Iza Molinari	02:44
12.	"Fausto"	Thomas Roth	André Mattos	02:47
13.	"O Amor É Surdo"	Thomas Roth	Adriana Drê	03:03
14.	"Leve"	Natália Keshi	Natália Keshi	03:22
15.	"Infinito"	Leonam Machado Gurgel; Luciano Roffer; Marcelo Leite da Silva; Levi dos Santos Correa; Junior Soares	Marcilio Freitas; Rayssa Celene; Musicmasters	03:06
16.	"Mulher Pavão"	Thomas Roth; Gaby Roth	Keco Brandão	02:22
17.	"Sublime"	Josias Damasceno	Davi Lins	03:16
Total length:				45:27

== See also ==
- Romeo and Juliet, a tragedy on which the soap opera is based.
- The Merchant of Venice, some of the characters appear in the soap opera.
