= Miguel Ângelo Faria =

Portuguese footballer

Miguel Ângelo
Personal information
- Full name: Miguel Ângelo Silva Mota Faria
- Date of birth: 20 March 1995 (age 31)
- Place of birth: Porto, Portugal
- Height: 1.77 m (5 ft 10 in)
- Position: Forward

Team information
- Current team: Montalegre
- Number: 10

Youth career
- 2004–2005: Leixões
- 2008–2012: Salgueiros
- 2012–2014: Leixões

Senior career*
Years	Team	Apps	(Gls)
2014–2018	Leixões	35	(4)
2016	→ Sousense	14	(2)
2017–2018	→ Freamunde (loan)	19	(0)
2018–2019	Leça	31	(1)
2019–2020	Anadia	8	(0)
2020	Gondomar	2	(0)
2020–	Montalegre	31	(2)
- * Club domestic league appearances and goals as of 21 October 2021

Miguel Ângelo Silva Mota Faria (born 20 March 1995) simply Miguel Ângelo, is a Portuguese footballer who plays for Montalegre as a forward.

== Career ==
On 23 May 2015, Miguel Ângelo made his professional debut with Leixões in a 2014–15 Segunda Liga match against Portimonense.
