= Fernanda Souza =

Brazilian actress (born 1984)

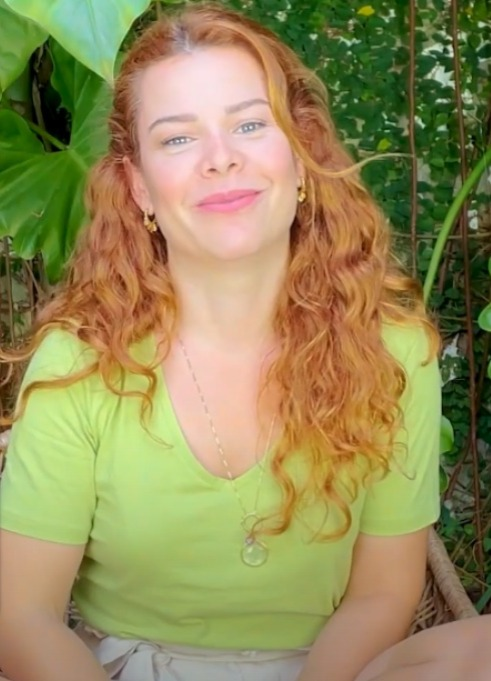
- Souza in 2022
- Born: Fernanda Rodrigues de Souza; 18 June 1984 (age 41); São Paulo, Brazil
- Occupations: Actress; TV host
- Years active: 1992–present
- Height: 1.56 m (5 ft 1 in)
- Spouse: Thiaguinho (m. 2015; div. 2019)

Fernanda Rodrigues de Souza (born 18 June 1984) is a Brazilian actress and TV host.

== Career ==
=== Filmography ===
Television
Year	Title	Role
1992	X-Tudo	Herself
1993	Retrato de Mulher	Jaqueline
1996	Razão de Viver	Patrícia
1997–1998	Chiquititas	Mili (Milena Pereira)
1999	Andando nas Nuvens	Joana
1999–2001	Malhação	Helô (Heloisa Castro)
2002–2003	Sabor da Paixão	Teca
2004	Um Só Coração	Dulce Amaral
2005–2006	Alma Gêmea	Mirna
2006–2007	O Profeta	Carola de Sousa
2007–2009	Toma Lá, Dá Cá	Isadora Dassoin
2010	Dança dos Famosos	Herself (winner)
2010–2011	Ti Ti Ti	Thaisa Maldonado
2011–2012	Aquele Beijo	Camila Collaboro
2012	A Grande Família	Bia Macedão
2013	A Mulher da Sua Vida	Various
2013–2014	Malhação	Bernadete
2014	The Voice Brasil	Reporter
2015–2016	A Regra do Jogo	Mel (Melisse de Araújo)
2015	Escolinha do Professor Raimundo	Tati
2016	Vai, Fernandinha	Presenter
2017	Casa TVZ Verão	Presenter
2017	Humoristinhas	Judge
2018	SóTocaTop	Presenter
2022	Iron Chef: Brasil	Presenter
2023–present	Ilhados com a Sogra	Presenter
2024	Angélica: 50 e Tanto	Herself
2024	Geração Chiquititas	Herself

Film
Year	Title	Role
2005	O Segredo dos Golfinhos	Vera Lu
2007	Tá Dando Onda	Lani Aliikay (voice)
2010	Muita Calma Nessa Hora	Aninha
2013	Muita Calma Nessa Hora 2	Aninha
2016	Tamo Junto	Carol
2023	EU	Herself
2023	Ressignificar	Herself

Theatre
Year	Title	Role
1998	Chiquititas Show	Mili
1999	A Bela e a Fera	Bela
2004	Beijos de Verão	Bárbara
2009	Enfim, Nós	Fernanda
2012	Um Sonho Pra Dois	Cléo
2023	Meu Passado Não Me Condena	Herself
