= Chiquititas (2013 Brazilian TV series) =

- Also known as: Chiquititas Remake
- Genre: Soap opera
- Created by: Cris Morena; Gustavo Barrios; Patricia Maldonado; Íris Abravanel
- Written by: Íris Abravanel
- Directed by: Reynaldo Boury; Ricardo Mantoanelli
- Starring: Isabela Palhano; Manuela do Monte; Guilherme Boury see more
- Theme music composer: Cris Morena; Carlos Nilson; Caion Gadia
- Opening theme: "Remexe"
- Composers: María Cristina De Giacomi; Carlos Nilson; Caion Gadia
- Country of origin: Brazil
- Original language: Portuguese
- No. of episodes: 545 (473 International version)

Production
- Producer: Fernando Pelegio
- Production location: CDT da Anhanguera - Osasco - Brazil
- Camera setup: Multiple-camera setup
- Running time: 60 mins.
- Production company: SBT

Original release
- Network: SBT, Nick@Nite, Disney Channel, Warner Channel
- Release: 15 July 2013 – 14 August 2015

Related
- Chiquititas (Argentine telenovela); Chiquititas (Brazilian telenovela)

Chiquititas, also known as Chiquititas Remake, is a 2013–2015 Brazilian soap opera written by Íris Abravanel, originally aired on SBT. Based on the original series of same name created by Cris Morena, it is also a remake of the previous version for that country. The soap opera is directed by Reynaldo Boury, with Ricardo Mantoanelli directing the music videos.

The remake was announced in September 2012 by SBT, with the purpose of maintaining the positive ratings given by Carrossel, also directed for younger viewers. Chiquititas was supposed to follow the traditional soap opera format, but as it gained very good ratings, it prompted the network to renew the series for two more seasons, delaying its ending for 2015.

Chiquititas stars Brazilian actress Manuela do Monte as Carol, a young woman who gradually assumes the role of a mother for a group of orphans living in a manor, the Raio de Luz orphanage, and Giovanna Grigio as Milena Pereira, an orphan who seeks to know about her unknown origins.

== Plot ==
Soon after Gabriela (Naiumi Goldoni) had a child, her father, José Ricardo Almeida Campos ([Roberto Frota]) kidnapped his granddaughter because, as a very conservative man, he could not accept the idea that his daughter became involved with a servant. As his granddaughter Mili, nicknamed Milena Pereira (Giovanna Grigio) needs a place to live, he starts an orphanage named "Raio De Luz" (originally "Rincón de Luz", which means "Corner of Light"). Mili grew up in this Manor, alongside other girls that later arrived. Her fellows are Bia, Ana, sisters Tati and Vivi, and Cris. As the years passed, the girls became a family.

They are supervised by Ernestina, the rigorous and funny janitor of the orphanage, and Chico, the adorable Chef very beloved by the girls. Sofia is the director of the orphanage until Carmem (Giovanna Gold), an ambitious woman who is also the sister of José Ricardo, takes her off this position. Their family is later increased with the arrival of Pata, Mosca, Binho and Rafa, children who lived in the streets before being upheld by the institution. Pata and Mili became best friends, while Binho, Mosca and Rafa are the first boys to be introduced in the manor. The homeless children are taken to the house by a sweethearted young woman who touches and changes their lives, as well as the lives of the girls inside Raio De Luz.

The woman is Carolina (Manuela do Monte), or Carol, a young woman who works at Café Boutique, one of the Almeida Campos coffee, and is also a psychology student. Carol lives with her friend Clarita (Letícia Navas) and her brother Beto (Emílio Eric Surita). They take care of Dani (Carolina Chamberlain), a girl that has recently lost her mother Letícia (Amanda Acosta). At her work, Carol meets Junior (Guilherme Boury), Ricardo's youngest son, an economist who lived in London and is back to São Paulo to continue his business. He discovers his emotionally unstable sister Gabriela, and blames his father for her condition. Junior also brings José Ricardo's supposed benevolence into question, since he always demonstrated snobbery and egoism. Alongside Carol, Junior helps Mili in the search for her past.

Carol and Junior fall in love with each other, but José Ricardo, with his snobbish behaviour, does the impossible to keep them apart. His daughter, Gabriela, became mentally affected since she believes she had a stillborn child, actually a lie her father had told her right after Mili was born. Her serious condition is softened by Mili herself, both unaware of their blood ties.

== Production ==
Differently from the previous Brazilian version, Chiquititas is completely produced in Brazil. Also, the cast members sing the musical themes by themselves, instead of dubbing the songs, as done in Chiquititas Brasil. Vocal skills were required during the auditions.

Actress Manuela do Monte portrays Carol. Monte stated that she did not watch the previous Brazilian version of the story, rather being inspired by real-life experiences in an orphanage she has frequented. Despite not watching Chiquititas Brasil, the actress stated that she did express interest in auditioning for a role at its time, but ended up not doing it. The part was played by actress Flávia Monteiro in Chiquititas Brasil, and by Romina Yan in Chiquititas (as Belén Fraga).

Isabela Palhano portrays Ana Paula the oldest orphan among the chiquititas. Isabela declared that she is doing her own version for the character, although praising its portrayal previously done by Fernanda Souza, which catapulted Souza's career. Mille was originally played by Argentine actress Agustina Cherri. Giovanna auditioned seven times until definitely getting the role.

Actor Gésio Amadeu, who portrayed Chico the Chef in Chiquititas Brasil, was asked by SBT to reprise his role, which he could not accept due to commitments with Rede Globo's telenovela Flor do Caribe. Fellow actor João Acaiabe was then suggested by Amadeu for the part. The character was originally portrayed by actor Alberto Fernández de Rosa (named Saverio the Chef), who was also a supervising producer of Chiquititas Brasil.

The series is directed by Reynaldo Boury, produced by Fernando Pelegio, and written by author Íris Abravanel, all of them responsible for the creation of Carrossel. Chiquititas is unique for having no involvement of creator Cris Morena.

=== Reaction of the Brazilian original cast ===
Actress Flávia Monteiro, who portrayed Carol in the previous version, has supported the remake by saying "I'm pretty sure that it'll be a huge hit. I hope they maintain that magic and sensibility (...). It's essential not to lose all that ludic and joy that existed". Fernanda Souza also demonstrated positive thoughts on the 2013 series, stating that Chiquititas is a beautiful work which children and teenagers are in need. Its innocence is missing". About the portrayal of Ana Paula, she declared, "She was a very special role to me, and I'm sure she's going to change her [Isabela Palhano] life as well".

Actor and humorist Nelson Freitas, who played the role of Doctor Fernando Brausen, opined, "The remake might achieve a good result, but that strong originality might be hard to supplant.

== Reception ==
The remake has fulfilled SBT's expectations, obtaining positive ratings at its premiere. Íris Abravanel's writing was also well received, particularly for her creative liberty in relation to both Chiquititas and Chiquititas Brasil's storylines. The series was supposed to end in 2014, but the good ratings forced SBT to increase the story, delaying the end of Chiquititas for 2015.

Manuela do Monte's portrayal of Carol, received initial criticism from fans and reviewers, who noticed a "lack of life" in her acting. However, a columnist emphasized that Monte is providing a completely new portrayal on the character, which diverges from the one made by Flávia Monteiro in Chiquititas Brasil.

Beyond the released soundtrack, the series spawned more than thirty different licensed products such as figurines and clothing.

=== Cast ===
The first seven Chiquititas from the young cast with Carol. From left to right: Top: Vivi, Ana Paula, Mili, Pata and Bia. Middle: Tati, Carol and Cris. Bottom: Ana

Actor	Character
Manuela do Monte	Carolina Correia (Carol) (Belén)
Guilherme Boury	José Ricardo Almeida Campos Júnior (Martín/Facundo)
Giovanna Gold	Carmem Aparecida Almeida Campos (Carmen Morán)
João Acaiabe	Francisco (Chico) (Savério)
Carla Fioroni	Ernestina Alves/Matilde Alves (Ernestina/Matilde)
Thais Pacholek	Andreia Casteli (Andréa)
Lisandra Parede	Maria Cecília Bittencourt (Dolores)
Letícia Navas	Clara (Clarita) (Clara)
Emílio Eric	Alberto Correia (Beto) (Piojo)
Roberto Frota	José Ricardo Almeida Campos (Ramiro Morán)
Naiumi Goldoni	Gabriela Almeida Campos (Gaby)
Paulo Leal	Dr. Fernando Brausen (Facundo)
Sandra Pêra	Valentina (Valentina)
Virgínia Nowicki	Eduarda
Pedro Lemos	Tobias (Tobias)
Amanda Acosta	Letícia (Leticia)
Olívia Araújo	Shirley Santana
Milena Ferrari	Cíntia (Ginette)
João Gabriel Vasconcellos	Armando (Hérnan)
Ernando Tiago	Cícero
Sâmia Abreu	Érica Mello (Anita)
Jitman Vibranovski	Simão
Homero Ligere	Francis
Renê Thristan	João Pedro "JP" (Javier)
Brunna Martins	Renata (Vicky)
Ana Paula Vieira	Linda Ribeiro
Valéria Sândalo	Glória (Gloria)

Children

Actor	Character
Giovanna Grigio	Mili
Yasmin	Yasmin(Yasmin)
Cinthia Cruz	Cristina (Cris) (Georgi)
Lívia Inhudes	Viviane Cícero (Vivi) (Vero/Pato)
Raissa Chaddad	Beatriz (Bia) (Cinthia)
Gabriella Saraivah	Tatiane Cícero (Tati) (Maru)
Giulia Garcia	Luciana (Ana) (Laura)
Carolina Chamberlain	Daniela (Dani) (Sol)
Gabriel Santana	Felipe (Mosca)
Guilherme Vieira	Rubens (Binho) (Roña)
Filipe Cavalcante	Rafael (Rafa) (Corcho)
Odoguiinha	Tatu #2
Filipe Bragança	Eduardo (Duda) (Julián/Matías)
Mateus Gomez	Eduardo (Duda stunt double of Filipe Bragança)
Thiago Wittner	Mathias
Rafael Miguel	Paçoca (Patrício)
Donato Veríssimo	Samuca (Guille)
Amanda Furtado	Boneca Laura
Anna Livya Padilha	Janu (Delfina)
Sophia Valverde	Maria (Nadia)
Júlia Gomes	Marian Almeida Campos Braga Pereira (Caro)
Lorena Tucci	Teca (Pilar)
Pedro Henrique	Thiago (Santi)
Kaik Francisco	Neco (Roña)
Gabriel Pereira	Diego Casteli (Dieguito)
Bianca Paiva	Lúcia (Lucía)
Naoki Takeda	Fábio
Matheus Chequer	Juca (Loco)
Veggari	Nicole
João Pedro Carvalho	Janjão (Barracuda)
Bruna Carvalho	Isabel (Bel) (Barbi)
Alexandre Bittencourt	Tatu (Coco)
Matheus Lustosa	André (Matías)

== Soundtrack ==
Chiquititas

Studio album by Various artists and Chiquititas cast
- Released: September 11, 2013
- Genres: Pop, soundtrack
- Length: 59:00 (Minutes)
- Label: SBT Music
- Producers: Arnaldo Saccomani; Laércio Ferreira

Track listing

1. Remexe (Rechufas) - Chiquititas opening theme
2. Todo Mundo Chique
3. Berlinda (A Berlín)
4. Sinais (Señales)
5. Te Gosto Tanto
6. Palco
7. O Chefe Chico (El Chef Saverio)
8. Mentirinhas (Mentiritas)
9. Quero Te Encontrar
10. Tudo, Tudo (Todo Todo)
11. Grava Essa Ideia
12. Amigas
13. Até Dez (Hasta Diez)
14. Abraça O Mundo
15. Igual Aos Demais (Igual A Los Demás)
16. Da Água Pro Vinho
17. Sempre Juntos

In addition to the original songs composed by Carlos Nilson and Cris Morena, the soundtrack features eight new themes, them being MPB cover versions and original themes composed and produced by Arnaldo Saccomani and Laércio Ferreira, respectively. The songs "Abraça o Mundo", "Amigas", "Sempre Juntos" and "Todo Mundo Chique" are original themes. "Grava Essa Ideia" and "Palco" are covers from Grupo D+ and the MPB singer Gilberto Gil. A version of Claudinho & Buchecha's 1997 single "Quero Te Encontrar" is also featured.
