= Maisa Silva =

Brazilian singer, TV host and actress (born 2002)

Maisa
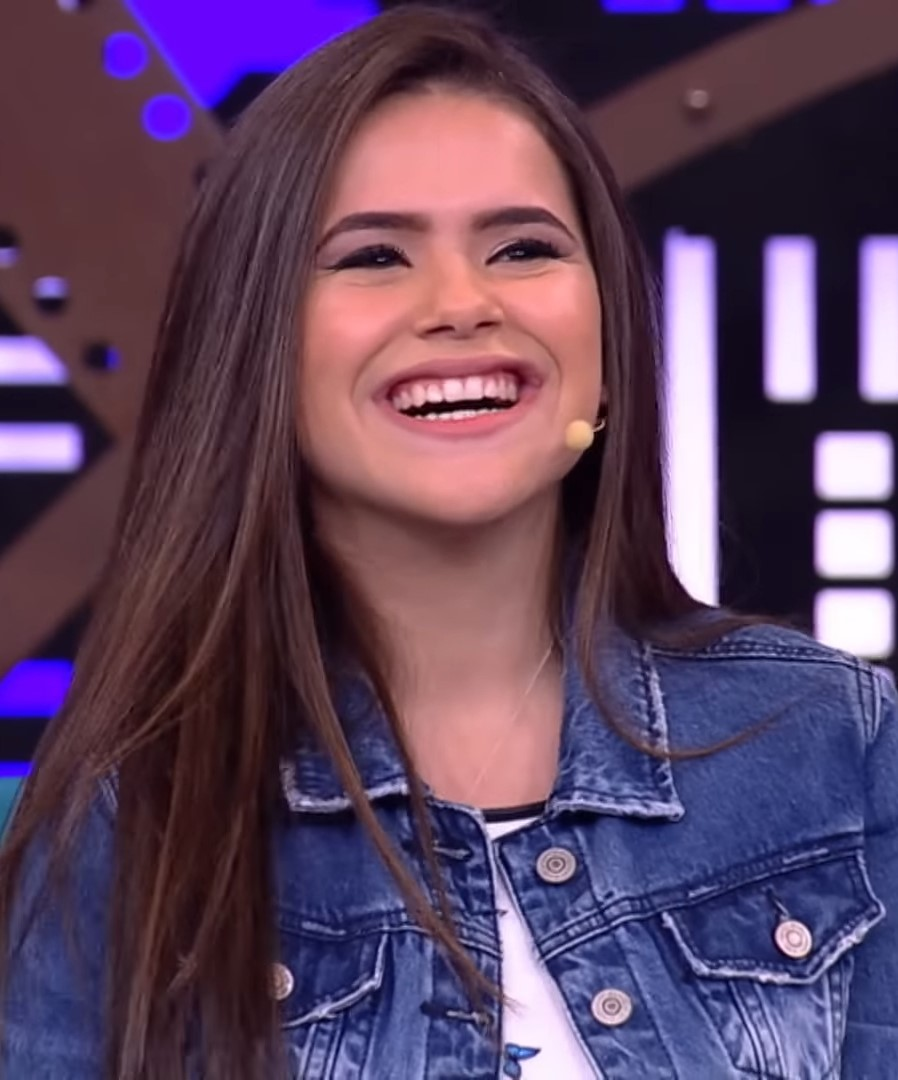
- Maisa at Lady Night in 2019.
- Born: Maisa da Silva Andrade; 22 May 2002 (age 24); São Bernardo do Campo, São Paulo, Brazil
- Other names: Maisinha; +A
- Occupation: Actress • presenter
- Years active: 2005–present
- Height: 1.61 m (5 ft 3 in)

Maisa da Silva Andrade (born 22 May 2002) is an Brazilian actress, presenter and former singer. She started her career at the age of three, when she participated in a group of freshmen on the Programa Raul Gil, on RecordTV and Band. Two years later, she was hired by SBT to present the programs Sábado Animado, Domingo Animado and Bom Dia & Cia, gaining greater prominence when sharing the show Pergunte a Maisa with boss Silvio Santos. As an actress, she gained fame through her role as Valéria Ferreira in Carrossel. Other notable roles in the actress' career include Juju Almeida in Carinha de Anjo, Cíntia Dorella in Cinderela Pop, Gabi in Tudo por um Popstar and playing her first villain in the film Ela Disse, Ele Disse, as Júlia.

== Career ==
2005–2011: Hired by SBT and presenting Sábado Animado

Maisa was discovered in 2005, when she participated in Programa Raul Gil, on RecordTV and, later, on Rede Bandeirantes, dubbing hits by the group Rouge, Ivete Sangalo and Wanessa. In 2007, she transferred to SBT, to present the program Sábado Animado, answering phone calls and presenting the program's games, roles she also performed on the programs Domingo Animado and Bom Dia & Cia. In 2008, Maisa's program on Saturdays managed, sometimes, more audience than the TV Xuxa program on TV Globo. Still in 2008, she began participating in the Programa Silvio Santos, as part of Pergunte a Maisa. At that time, SBT adopted the strategy of using a costume that associated the presenter with the child actress of the 1930s, Shirley Temple. Her first studio album, Tudo que Me Vem na Cabeça, released through Universal Music in 2009, brought songs that became her trademark, such as Tempo de Mudar, Pipoca Pula, Me Liga, and Tudo Que me Vem na Cabeça, with guest appearances specials such as Eliana, Jorge & Mateus, Ivete Sangalo and Roger Moreira (from the band Ultraje a Rigor).

She left Bom Dia & Cia on 12 October 2011, to play Valéria Ferreira, the girlfriend of Davi Rabinovich (Guilherme Seta), in the remake of the soap opera Carrossel, a plot adapted by Íris Abravanel.

2012–2018: Returning to Sábado Animado and gaining notoriety in the media

Maísa returned to Sábado Animado in April 2013, alongside Ana Zimerman and Matheus Ueta. Initially she presented alone on Mondays and Wednesdays, but, with the addition of more presenters, she started to alternate the presentation with the two of them in pairs. In 2014, he presented the program Mundo Pet with Carla Fioroni. In December 2014, she released her first extended play Eu Cresci!, with five new tracks on iTunes Brazil and Google Play. The EP was produced by Otávio de Moraes and remained on the Brasil Hot 100 Airplay charts for a long time. Eu Cresci was the first single from the album, followed by NheNheNhem. This, released in June 2015, ended up coming first on the Spotify Brazil list "Brazil Viral 50". However, during the Domingo Legal program on SBT shown on 9 August 2015, Maisa revealed to Celso Portiolli that she became a victim of bullying at school because of music and regretted it.

In 2015, she made her film debut in the film Carrossel: O Filme, which received a sequel, entitled Carrossel 2: O Sumiço de Maria Joaquina in 2016, the year in which she was cast in her second soap opera, Carinha de Anjo. In the same year, she published his first book, Sinceramente Maisa, where she talks a little about her career. In 2017, she filmed the film adaptation of the book Tudo por um Popstar, playing Gabi, one of the three protagonists, alongside Klara Castanho and Mel Maia. The film premiered in theaters in 2018. Still in 2017, she published two more books, O Diário de Maisa, where she talks a little more about her life; and O Livro de Tweets da +A, where he shows some of her Twitter posts. She voiced Nina in the film Ferdinand, which premiered in Brazil on 11 January 2018. In August 2018, she entered the list of the most watched Instagram Stories in Brazil, occupying 10th position. In December, she became the most followed teenager in the world, losing the position the following year to singer Billie Eilish.

Still in 2018, Maisa participated in the film Cinderela Pop, in which she played the protagonist Cintia Dorella. The film premiered in theaters on 28 February 2019.

2019–present: Programa da Maísa, departure from SBT and De Volta aos 15

In 2019, she got her own program on SBT, Programa da Maisa, sharing the talk show presentation with comedian Oscar Filho. She was also in the film Ela Disse, Ele Disse, in which she played her first villain, Júlia. The film premiered in cinemas on 3 October 2019. In December 2019, it entered the ranking of the QualiBest institute as one of the biggest digital influencers in Brazil.

In 2020, she was in Milan to watch the Dolce and Gabbana fashion show with other young internet influencers from different parts of the world, in addition to participating in an action by the brand for TikTok. She also starred in another film, Pai em Dobro, her first Netflix film. In October 2020, Maisa announced on the internet that she decided not to renew her contract with SBT, which would end at the end of the month, due to new personal and professional projects that she wants to do. Thus, at the end of the month, Maisa left SBT after 13 years at the station. In her farewell, she received tributes from several personalities in the house, such as Raul Gil and Silvia Abravanel. With Maisa's departure from SBT, Programa da Maisa also came to an end. On 14 December 2020, Maisa announced her first step as an entrepreneur. Alongside her businessman – and now partner, Guilherme Oliveira – Maisa created Mudah, an agency that aims to connect brands and artists for work and actions in the areas of influencer marketing and advertising.

In 2021, Maisa was confirmed in the new Netflix series, De volta aos 15. The series was released the following year. In the series, Maisa plays the protagonist Anita in her teenage version, while the adult version is played by Camila Queiroz. The series premiered in 2022 and, due to its success, was renewed for a second season scheduled for 2023.

== Personal life ==
An only child, Maisa was born in ABC Paulista and lived from two to seven years old in São José dos Campos. For professional reasons in July 2009, she moved to Alphaville, in Barueri.

In October 2013, at the age of eleven, she announced that she would no longer wear her characteristic curls in her hair, as she preferred to leave it straight.

The presenter declares herself a feminist "Having the notion that, historically, women have been labeled and limited awakens [in me] the desire to be a woman, to use this to my advantage", she stated.

== Speeches ==
The length of her career made Maisa, despite being young, a respected name to speak about her areas of activity. Because of this, she is invited to speak at major events.

"Você tem Sonhos?": Maisa Silva's first lecture was held at the Ibirapuera Auditorium, in SP, for 8 thousand young people. At the event, the presenter spoke about dreams and goals.

ProXXIma 2019: Lecture at a communication event, in which Maisa spoke about her professional career, advertising work and relationship with the media.

YOUPIX Summit 2019: "Maisa Interview Paulo Marinho". In the chat, the two professionals spoke about online and offline communication, the future of communication and content creation.

RD Summit 2019: Alongside SBT CEO José Roberto Maciel, Maisa spoke about the communications market and the "convergence between ON and OFF media".

== Filmography ==
=== Television ===
Year	Title	Role	Notes
2005–2006	Programa Raul Gil	Herself	Quadro: "Eu e As Crianças"
2007–2011	Sábado Animado	Presenter	
2008–2010	Domingo Animado	Presenter	
2009–2013	Bom Dia & Cia	Presenter	
2009–2011	Carrossel Animado	Presenter	
2009–present	Teleton	Presenter	
2012–2013	Carrossel	Valéria Ferreira	
2014–2015	Patrulha Salvadora	Valéria Ferreira	
2014	Mundo Pet	Presenter	
2014	Chiquititas	Cerimonialist	Episodes: "June 26–27"
2015–2019	Domingo Legal	Reporter	
2016–2018	Carinha de Anjo	Juliana Almeida (Juju)	
2019–2020	Programa da Maisa	Presenter	
2021	Bake Off Celebridades	Participant (11th place)	Season 1
2022	Call com Cleo	Manu	Episode: "Oi, sumida!"
2022–2024	Back to 15	Anita Rocha	Protagonist
2024–2025	Garota do Momento	Beatriz "Bia" Dourado Alencar / Isabel Alencar	

=== Film ===
Year	Title	Role	Notes
2015	Carrossel: O Filme	Valéria Ferreira	
2016	Carrossel 2: O Sumiço de Maria Joaquina	Valéria Ferreira	
2018	Tudo por um Popstar	Gabriela Diniz (Gabi)	
2019	Cinderela Pop	Cintia Dorella	
2019	Ela Disse, Ele Disse	Júlia (M.A.B.U.)	
2021	Double Dad	Vicenza Shakti Pravananda Sarahara Oxalá Zalala da Silva	
2023	Desapega!	Maria Eduarda (Duda)	
2024	Princesa Adormecida	Cintia Dorella	

Dubbing

Year	Title	Role	Notes
2016	Carrossel em Desenho Animado	Valéria Ferreira	Brazilian Dubbing
2017	GadgetGang in Outer Space	Fefa	Brazilian Dubbing
2017	Smurfs: The Lost Village	SmurfLily	Brazilian Dubbing
2018	Ferdinand	Nina	Brazilian Dubbing
2026	Toy Story 5	Lilypad	Brazilian Dubbing

Teather

Year	Title	Role	Ref.
2013	Especial Carrossel: Circo Tihany	Valéria Ferreira	
2015–2016	Maisa no Ar	Maisa	

== Literature ==
Year	Title
2016	Sinceramente Maisa – Histórias de Uma Garota Nada Convencional
2017	O Diário de Maisa
2017	O Livro de Tweets da +A: As Histórias Além dos 140 Caracteres da Maisa Silva

== Discography ==
Studio Album
Year	Details	Ref.
2009	Tudo que Me Vem na Cabeça: Lançamento: 28 de agosto de 2009; Gravadora(s): Universal Music; Formato(s): CD, download digital	

Extended play (EP)
Year	Details	Ref.
2014	Eu Cresci!: Lançamento: 18 de dezembro de 2014; Gravadora(s): 11:11 Produções Musicais; Formato(s): Download digital	

== Awards and nominations ==
Year	Association	Category	Nominated work	Result	Ref.
2009	Troféu Internet	Revelação do Ano	Herself	Won	
2009	Troféu Imprensa	Revelação do Ano	Herself	Won	
2010
2010	Troféu Internet	Best Children's Program	Bom Dia & Cia	Won	
2010	Troféu Imprensa	Best Children's Program	Bom Dia & Cia	Won	
2012	Meus Prêmios Nick	Personagem de TV Favorito (first phase)	Valéria in Carrossel	Nominated	
2013	Prêmio Contigo! de TV	Melhor Atriz Infantil	Valéria in Carrossel	Nominated	
2016	Prêmio Febre Teen 2016	Melhor Instagram do ano	@Maisa	Won	
2017
2017	Meus Prêmios Nick	Artista de TV Favorita	Hersel	Nominated	
2017	Meus Prêmios Nick	YouTuber Feminina Favorita	Herself	Nominated	
2017	BreakTudo Awards	Atriz Favorita do Público	Valéria in Carrossel 2	Nominated	
2017	Prêmio Jovem Brasileiro	Melhor Atriz	Juju Almeida in Carinha de Anjo	Nominated	
2017	Prêmio Jovem Brasileiro	Personalidade da Internet	Ela Mesma	Nominated	
2017	Prêmio Jovem Brasileiro	Melhores Memes	Herself	Won	
2017	Capricho Awards	Vida Real	Herself	Won	
2017	Capricho Awards	Influencer do Ano	Herself	Won	
2018	Troféu Internet	Melhor Atriz	Juju Almeida in Carinha de Anjo	Nominated	
2018	Prêmio Jovem Brasileiro	Melhor Atriz	Juju Almeida in Carinha de Anjo	Nominated	
2018	Prêmio Jovem Brasileiro	Melhor Apresentadora	Ela Mesma	Nominated	
2018	Prêmio F5	Casal do Ano	Maisa Silva e Nicholas Arashiro	Won	
2018	Meus Prêmios Nick	Instagram Favorito	Herself	Nominated	
2018	Meus Prêmios Nick	Artista de TV Favorito	Ela Mesma	Nominated	
2018	Meus Prêmios Nick	Ship do Ano	Maisa Silva e Nicholas Arashiro	Nominated	
2018	Meus Prêmios Nick	Canal de YouTube Favorito	Maisa Silva 🎵	Won	
2019	Kids' Choice Awards	Favorite Brazilian Influencer	Herself	Nominated	
2019	Prêmio Jovem Brasileiro	Best Program	Programa da Maisa	Won	
2019	Prêmio Jovem Brasileiro	best presenter	Programa da Maisa	Won	
2019	Prêmio Contigo! Online	Best Children's Program	Programa da Maisa	Won	
2019	Meus Prêmios Nick	Best Program	Programa da Maisa	Won	
2019	Meus Prêmios Nick	Female TV Artist	Programa da Maisa	Nominated	
2019	Meus Prêmios Nick	Instagram of the Year	Herself	Nominated	
2019	Prêmio Geração Glamour	Generation Z	Herself	Won	
2020	Kids' Choice Awards	Favorite Brazilian Artist	Herself	Won	
2020	Séries em Cena Awards	Influencer Personality of the Year	Herself	Won	
2020	Prêmio Jovem Brasileiro	Best Program	Programa da Maisa	Won	
2020	Meus Prêmios Nick	Best Program	Programa da Maisa	Nominated	
2020	Meus Prêmios Nick	Female TV Artist	Programa da Maisa	Nominated	
2020	Meus Prêmios Nick	Instagram	Herself	Nominated	
2020	Meus Prêmios Nick	TikToker	Herself	Nominated	
2020	MTV Millennial Awards Brazil	MIAW icon	Herself	Nominated	
2020	MTV Millennial Awards Brazil	Absurd Tik Toker	@maisa	Nominated	
2020	Premio F5	Best Variety Show	Programa da Maisa	Won	
2020	Premio F5	Best Variety Presenter	Programa Da Maisa	Nominated	
2020	Premio F5	TV show makes me miss you more	Programa Da Maisa	Nominated	
2020	Prêmio Contigo! Online	Best Youth Program	Programa da Maisa	Won	
2020	Capricho Awards	Style Inspiration	Herself	Nominated	
2020	Capricho Awards	Best couple	Maisa Silva e Nicholas Arashiro	Won	
2020	Splash Awards	best tweeter	@maisa +a	Won	
2021	Troféu Internet	Melhor programa de auditório	Programa Da Maisa	Nominated	
2021	Troféu Internet	Melhor programa de entrevista	Programa Da Maisa	Nominated	
2021	Troféu Internet	Melhor animadora ou apresentadora de auditório de TV	Programa Da Maisa	Nominated	
2021	Séries em Cena Awards	Best National Film Actress	Vicenza in Double Dad	Won	
2021	Flame Roem World Awards	Teen star 2021	Herself	Won	
2021	Meus Prêmios Nick	FAVORITE BRAZILIAN TV PROGRAM	Programa da Maisa	Nominated	
2021	Meus Prêmios Nick	Female TV Artist	Programa da Maisa	Nominated	
2021	Prêmio iBest	Influencer of the Year São Paulo	Herself	Won	
2021	Prêmio iBest	TikToker do Ano	Herself	Won	
2021	Prêmio todateen	Teen Artist	Herself	Won	
2021	Splash Awards	Best Twitter Profile	Herself	Won	
2022	Séries em Cena Awards	Best Actress in a Teen Series	Anita in Back To 15	Won	
2022	Break Tudo Awards	National Actress	Anita in Back To 15	Won	
2022	Capricho Awards	National Artist of the Year (Film and TV)	Anita in Back To 15	Won	
2022	Prêmio iBest	Influencer São Paulo	Herself	Won Top 3	
2023
2023	LINE Popture Awards	National TV Star	Herself	Won	
2023	Séries em Cena Awards	Performance in National Film	Duda in Desapega	Won	
2024	Séries em Cena Awards	Best Actress in a Series	Anita in Back To 15	Won	

== See also ==
- Tudum
