= Ella (Brazilian singer) =

Ella Viana de Holanda
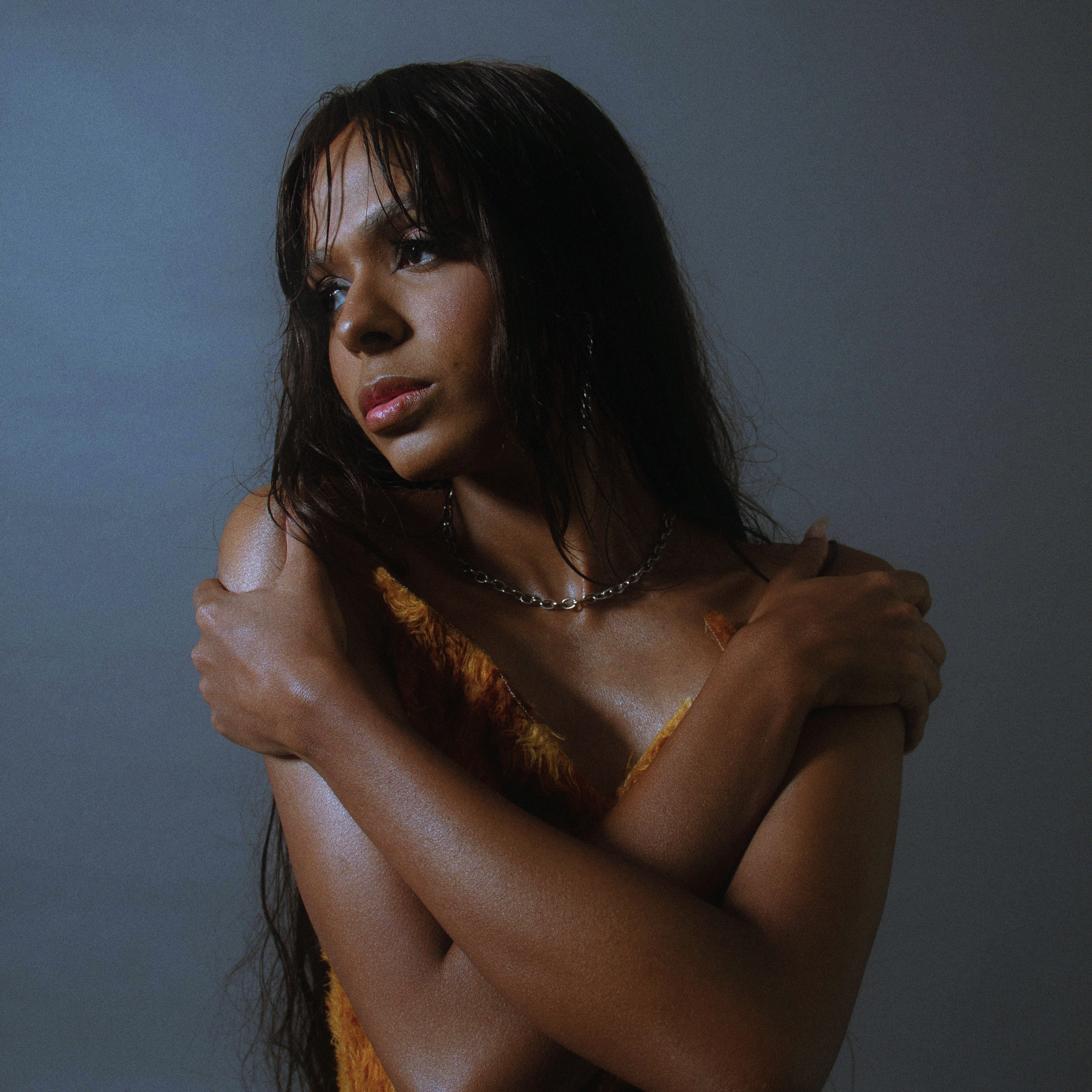

Background information
- Born: 8 October 1997 (age 29); Guajará-Mirim, Rondônia, Brazil
- Genres: Contemporary Christian music, R&B (2003–2020); Pop music, reggaeton (2020–present)
- Instrument: Vocals
- Years active: 2003–present
- Labels: Central Gospel (2012–2015); Independent (2016–present)

Ella Viana de Holanda (born 8 October 1997), known as Ella or Jotta A, is a Brazilian singer and songwriter of pop music, synthwave and contemporary R&B.

She began her career very early, at the age of 6, in gospel music, in 2003, with the album "Sou Um Milagre". A few years later, she participated in a talent show hosted by Raul Gil, at the age of 12, where she became well known for her ease in reaching the high notes. Having won, she signed a contract with the record label Central Gospel, where she released the album Essência, which earned her nominations for the Troféu Promessas award. In 2013, she released the album Geração de Jesus, with the participation of singer Daniela Araújo as music producer, which was nominated for a Latin Grammy the following year.

In 2017, she released her fourth work, Recomeçar. The following year, she released her first album in Spanish, "Muéstrame Tu Gloria", with the title track earning over 100 million views on YouTube, proving to be a great success among Spanish-speaking countries.

In 2020, the singer announced her departure from gospel music to launch herself into pop and reggaeton music. In 2022, Ella revealed through social media that she is a transgender woman and began the process of transitioning including changing her registered name and gender.

== Career ==
The musician became nationally known after being revealed in a talent show on the Raul Gil Program in 2011. After winning the program, she was signed to the Central Gospel Music label and released her first album, called Essência, which has already sold over eighty thousand copies and was certified platinum.

On 7 February 2011, she participated in the recording of the DVD Ao Deus das Causas Impossíveis alongside Davi Sacer and the Apascentar de Louvor, a group that the singer admires.

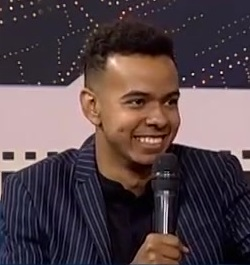
Jotta A giving an interview to Boas Novas in 2017.

At the Troféu de Ouro awards, the singer was the winner of the Best Singer nomination. She was nominated in several categories at the Troféu Promessas in 2012, with highlights for Revelation, Best Singer and Best CD, with Essência. However, the singer only won in the Revelation nomination.

In 2013, she released Geração de Jesus, produced by singer Daniela Araújo and Jorginho Araújo, containing some original songs and partnerships with Daniela. The Christian music portal O Propagador characterized it as a search for the singer's identity, notable for the influence of Daniela Araújo in the repertoire, also considering her passage through puberty and such effects on her voice, risking new sound elements in relation to her previous Essência. The album sold 30 thousand copies in a few days.

In 2014, the album was nominated for a Latin Grammy Award for Best Christian Album (Portuguese Language), but lost to Graça, by Aline Barros.

In 2017, Jotta A released the album Recomeçar, which indicated her return to the music market. The album, whose production was signed by Jeziel Assunção and William Augusto and had "Princípio e Fim" as a single.

In 2020, Jotta A broke away from the gospel market and debuted in pop music with the single "Aventurero", in Spanish.

In 2021, entering the LGBTQ pop music scene, Jotta released the single "Pessoa Certa" with the participation of drag queen Aretuza Lovi, which led to great rejection from her gospel audience.

After announcing her gender transition, in early 2022, the singer released the singles "Éden" and "Apollo 11", featuring retrowave arrangements and 1980s aesthetics. At the time, Jotta declared "gospel was a school, just as pop music has been an industry of a lot of learning". Months later, the singer released the singles "Humano" and "Alasca", tracks from her first studio album in pop.

In February 2023, Ella released the album La Drácula with 8 tracks, including the new single "Tóxico".

== Personal life ==
On 28 June 2020, on World LGBT Pride Day, Ella revealed that she was bisexual through social media. Despite being born into a Christian family, the singer had her sexual orientation accepted by her family: "Coming out as LGBTQI+ can still be a shot in the foot for many, but I remember when I told my family and I was embraced and loved in a way I didn't expect," she said. However, in an interview with Splash in 2021, the singer said she suffered prejudice and threats from the public: "I suffer death threats every day, words of hate, racism, homophobia. People underestimate my work" [...]. Regarding religion, the singer – who previously declared herself an evangelical – said she did not follow any religious doctrine: "I am grateful for the path I have had, but I do not follow any religion. I only believe in God".

On 11 April 2022, she revealed that she was a trans woman through social media, referring to herself using feminine pronouns and filing a request to change her registered name. The singer revealed that she would keep her stage name as well as her civil name: "I came to the conclusion that I should keep “Jotta” (although it was never my registered name, only my stage name), but also that this is a way to always be linked to my story."

In an interview, she revealed her desire to reconnect with Candomblé, a tradition present in her maternal family. She highlighted her love for Candomblé and the importance of this religion in her life. The artist stated that attending terreiros was a transformative experience.

== Discography ==
- 2003: Sou Um Milagre
- 2012: Essência
- 2013: Geração de Jesus
- 2017: Recomeçar
- 2018: Muéstrame Tu Gloria
- 2019: Extravagante Adoración
- 2021: Noel, Vol.1
- 2023: La Drácula

== Awards and nominations ==
Promises Trophy 2012
Category	Album	Result
Revelation	Ela mesma	Won
Best CD	Essência	Nominated
Best Singer	Ela mesma	Nominated

2014 Latin Grammy Awards
Category	Album	Result
Best Christian Music Album in Portuguese	Geração de Jesus	Nominated
