= Paula Pimenta =

- Born: June 2, 1975 (age 51); Belo Horizonte, Brazil
- Education: Pontificia Universidade Catolica de Minas Gerais
- Occupations: Writer, Marketing, Music teacher, Screenwriter
- Known for: Writing children's literature
- Notable work: Fazendo meu Filme
- Spouse: Marcio (2015 – )
- Website: https://www.paulapimenta.com.br/

Paula Pimenta (June 2, 1975 – ) is a bestselling Brazilian children and young adult writer. Author of 20+ books, she is best known for her series Fazendo meu Filme and Minha Vida Fora de Série.

Pimenta was named one of Brazil's 100 most influential people by Época in 2012. She sold the most books out of any author in Brazil in 2014.

== Biography ==
Pimenta was born in Belo Horizonte, Brazil in 1975.

Pimenta graduated from Pontificia Universidade Catolica de Minas Gerais with a degree in advertising. She worked as a music teacher for many years.

Pimenta published her first book, a poetry collection, Confissão, in 2001. She wrote the book with editing and support from her father.

Pimenta moved from Brazil in 2005. She later moved back in with her family in Belo Horizonte.

Pimenta published her second book, and first bestseller, Fazendo meu Filme: A Estreia de Fani, in 2008. The book became popular through word of mouth. The book was translated into English in 2012. A film version of Fazendo meu Filme: A Estreia de Fani came out in 2024 on Amazon Prime Video.

Pimenta followed up A Estreia de Fani with 8 more books in the series. In 2018, she had sold 750 million copies of Fazendo Meu Filme.

In 2011, Pimenta published the first book in her second series, Minha Vida Fora de Série. It was a spinoff from Fazendo Meu Filme. Pimenta has written five books in the Minha Vida Fora de Série.

In 2013, Pimenta contributed a short story to O livro das princesas. Other featured authors included Meg Cabot, Lauren Kate, and Patricia Barboza. By July of 2013, O Livro das princesas had sold 250 thousand copies. Pimenta wrote "Cinderela Pop", which would turn into a full book and the first book of her princesses collection in 2015.

In an interview with Folha de S.Paulo, she described her writing as "novels, they are meant to make you dream... I like reading books like this, which make us float." She calls them "pink books."

Pimenta married in 2015. She has a daughter.

In 2026, Pimenta began a second spin-off series called A música da minha vida about the niece of the main character of the Fazendo Meu Filme series.

== Bibliography ==
- Confissão (2001). Gutenberg.
- Fazendo meu Filme: A Estreia de Fani (2008). Gutenberg.
- Fazendo meu Filme 2: Fani na Terra da Rainha (2009). Gutenberg.
- Fazendo meu Filme 3: O Roteiro Inesperado de Fani (2010). Gutenberg.
- Minha Vida Fora de Série: 1ª temporada (2011). Gutenberg.
- Fazendo meu Filme 4: Fani em busca do final feliz (2012). Gutenberg.
- Apaixonada por Palavras (2012). Gutenberg.
- Minha Vida Fora de Série: 2ª temporada (2013). Gutenberg.
- Apaixonada por Histórias (2014). Gutenberg.
- Princesa Adormecida (2014). Gallery Record
- Fazendo meu filme em quadrinhos: Antes do filme começar (2014). Gutenberg.
- Um Ano Inesquecível: Inverno (2015). Gutenberg.
- Cinderela Pop (2015). Galera Record.
- Minha Vida Fora de Série: 3ª temporada (2015). Gutenberg.
- Fazendo meu filme em quadrinhos 2: Azar no jogo, sorte no amor? (2015). Gutenberg.
- Fazendo Meu Filme em quadrinhos 3: Não dou, Não empresto, e Não vendo! (2016). Gutenberg.
- Princesa das Águas (2016). Galera Record.
- Minha Vida Fora de Série: 4ª Temporada (2017). Gutenberg.
- Fazendo Meu Filme: 10 Anos (2018). Gutenberg.
- Fazendo Meu Filme: Lado B (2019). Gutenberg.
- 20 contos Sobre a Pandemia de 2020 (2020). Autêntica.
- As Meninas Maluquinhas (2021). Melhoramentos.
- Minha Vida Fora de Série: 5ª Temporada (2023). Gutenberg.
- Apaixonada por Você (2025). Gutenberg.
- A música da minha vida (2026).

== Filmography ==
Year	Title	Role
2019	Cinderela Pop	Contributing screenwriter, adaptation of novel
2023	Um Ano Inesquecível - Inverno	Adaptation of novel
2024	Princesa Adormecida	Contributing screenwriter, adaptation of novel
2024	Shooting My Life's Script	Contributing screenwriter, adaptation of novel
