= Walt Disney Studios Motion Pictures =

American film distribution studio

- Logo used since 2007

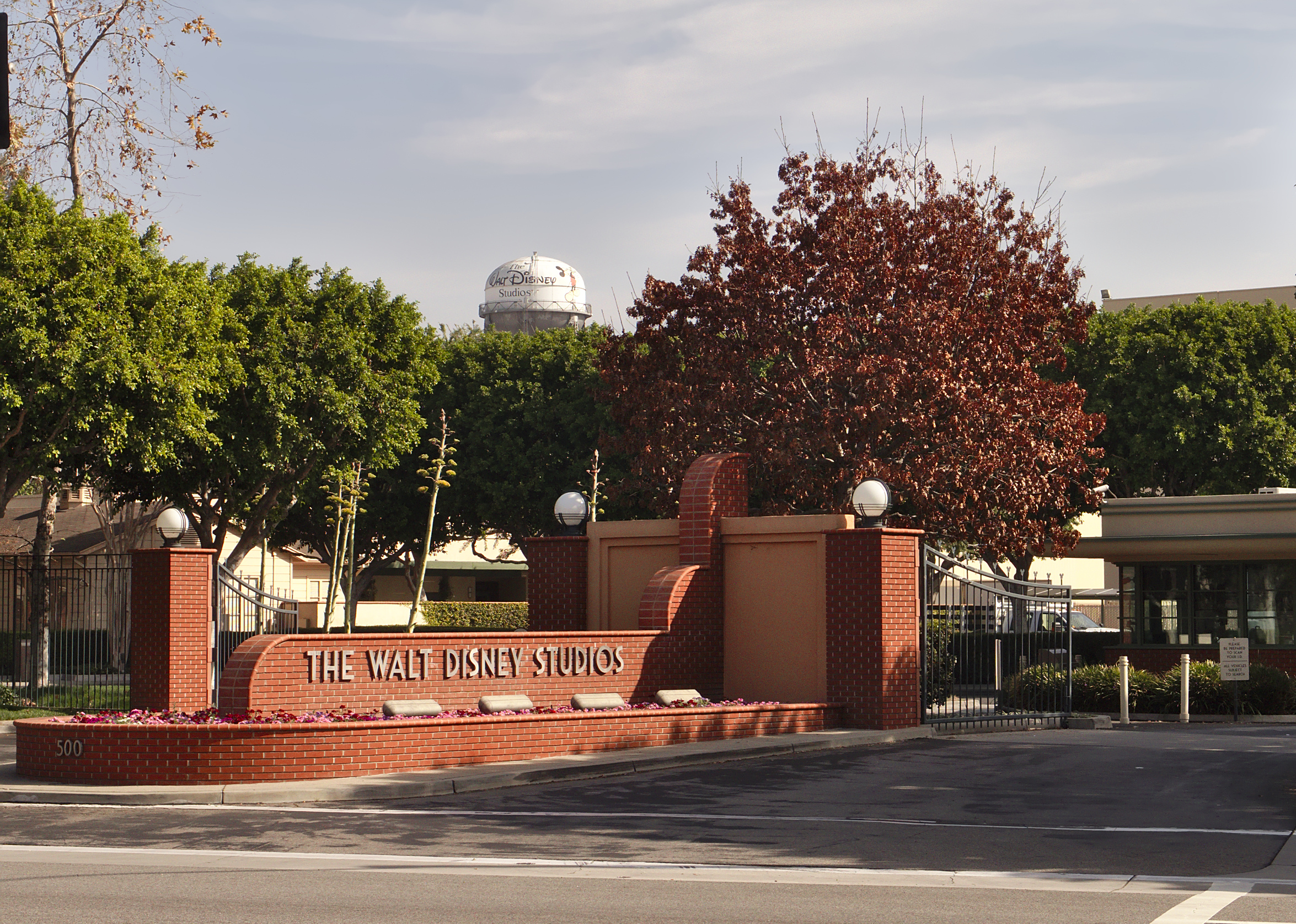
- The Walt Disney Studios' Riverside Drive property in Burbank, California
- Formerly: Buena Vista Film Distribution (1953–1960; 1969–1970; 1974); Buena Vista Distribution (1960–1969; 1970–1974; 1975–1987); Buena Vista Pictures Distribution (1987–2007)
- Type: Division
- Industry: Film
- Founded: June 23, 1953; 73 years ago
- Founder: Walt Disney
- Headquarters: Walt Disney Studios, Burbank, California, U.S.
- Key people: Andrew Cripps (EVP)
- Services: Film distribution; Film promotion
- Parent: Disney Entertainment
- Divisions: Walt Disney Studios Marketing; Worldwide Special Events
- Subsidiaries: El Capitan Theatre; Buena Vista International, Inc.; Infinity Vision

Walt Disney Studios Motion Pictures is an American film distributor within the Disney Entertainment division of the Walt Disney Company. It handles theatrical and occasional digital distribution, marketing, and promotion for films produced and acquired by the Walt Disney Studios, including Walt Disney Pictures, Walt Disney Animation Studios, Pixar, Marvel Studios, Lucasfilm, 20th Century Studios and Searchlight Pictures, though the latter unit operates its own autonomous theatrical distribution and marketing unit in the United States. It also handles the limited theatrical releases of documentaries from Disney Original Documentary, a division of Disney Kids & Family.

The company was originally established by Walt Disney in 1953 as Buena Vista Film Distribution Company Inc., later renamed Buena Vista Distribution Inc. and Buena Vista Pictures Distribution Inc.. It took on its current name in 2007.

== History ==
Winkler Pictures produced and distributed Walt Disney's films from 1924 to 1925, with FBO and Universal Pictures serving as Winkler's distributor until 1928.

Walt Disney Productions films were previously distributed by:

- Celebrity Productions (1928–1930)
- Columbia Pictures (1929–1932)
- United Artists (1932–1937, 1943)
- RKO Radio Pictures (1937–1957)

=== Buena Vista ===
A dispute with RKO Pictures in 1953 over the distribution of The Living Desert, Disney's first full-length film in the True-Life Adventures series, led Walt and his older brother Roy O. Disney to form its wholly owned subsidiary, the Buena Vista Film Distribution Company, Inc. (BVDC), to handle North American distribution of their own products. RKO refused to distribute the film. The name "Buena Vista" came from the eponymous street in Burbank, California, where the Walt Disney Studios was located, and remains to this day. Buena Vista's first release was the Academy Award-winning live-action feature The Living Desert on November 10, 1953, along with Toot, Whistle, Plunk and Boom, Buena Vista's first animated release.

In September 1954, it was reported that Buena Vista would distribute Disney's features in the U.S. for the next two years while RKO would still distribute Disney's shorts due to existing contracts. In August 1956, Disney revealed a release schedule for Buena Vista extending into 1958 which had outside-produced and foreign films alongside Disney's own films. Releases from this time included the Japanese Daiei film Princess Yang Kwei Fei (Most Noble Lady), released in US theaters in September 1956, the Austrian film Victoria in Dover in January 1958, The Missouri Traveler in March 1958, and The Big Fisherman in July 1959 (the first third-party production financed by Disney).

On January 22, 1957, RKO's short distribution deal with Disney was revoked, allowing Buena Vista to distribute all of Disney's short films. By July 5, 1957, RKO Japan, Ltd. was sold to Disney Productions and British Commonwealth Film Corporation. In allocating the foreign film licenses to the company, Disney would use 5 and Commonwealth 8.

In April 1960, the company dropped "Film" from its name. In 1961, Disney incorporated Buena Vista International (BVI), distributing its first PG-rated film, Take Down, in January 1979. Take Down was not produced by Disney itself, but was instead acquired from an independent studio, making The Black Hole the first PG-rated Disney film. In 1974, Buena Vista re-released the black-and-white Mickey Mouse shorts The Klondike Kid, Touchdown Mickey, Mickey's Good Deed, Building a Building, The Mail Pilot, Two-Gun Mickey, and Shanghaied to theaters after noticing the surging interest in Fantasia and other older films at the time. In May 1987, Buena Vista changed its name to Buena Vista Pictures Distribution, Inc. (BVPD).

In the 1980s, Disney purchased a controlling stake in one of Pacific Theatres' chains leading to Disney's Buena Vista Theaters and Pacific to renovate the El Capitan Theatre and the Crest by 1989. The Crest was finished first while El Capitan opened with the premiere of The Rocketeer film on June 19, 1991.

In 1992, Buena Vista made production loans totaling $5.6 million to Cinergi Pictures for its film Medicine Man and its 1994 films Renaissance Man and Color of Night and were distributing Cinergi's films. The corporation purchased a 12.8% share in Cinergi with its initial public offering in 1994. Soon, BVPD signed a 25 picture distribution deal with Cinergi.

Gaumont and Disney formed Gaumont Buena Vista International, a joint venture in French distribution, in 1993. In August 1996, Disney and Tokuma Shoten Publishing agreed that Disney would distribute Studio Ghibli animated films and provide 10% of the production cost of the studio's current in-production film, Spirited Away. Disney would go on to produce the English dubs and distribute 15 of Ghibli's films, through the Walt Disney Pictures, Buena Vista Home Video, Miramax and Touchstone Pictures banners.

In September 1996, following Disney's acquisition of Capital Cities/ABC, Buena Vista Pictures Distribution, Inc. was merged into ABC, Inc., the parent company of that group.

For the November 1995 premiere of Toy Story, Disney rented the Hollywood Masonic Temple—adjacent to the El Capitan Theatre—for Totally Toy Story, a multimedia funhouse and a promotional event for the movie. On July 17, 1998, Buena Vista Pictures Distribution purchased the Hollywood Masonic Temple building to continue using it as a promotional venue.

By 1997, BVPD's share in Cinergi dropped to 5%. After nine films were delivered under the agreement, Cinergi sold on November 22, 1997, all of its 12-film library with the exception of Die Hard with a Vengeance to Disney, plus $20 million in exchange for Disney's Cinergi share holdings, production advances of $35.4 million and other loans. In 2002, Disney signed a four animated film deal with Vanguard Animation; however, only one film was released under that negotiation.

In 2004, BVI and Gaumont dissolved their French distribution joint venture, Gaumont Buena Vista International. Buena Vista International agreed to a distribution deal with MegaStar Joint Venture Company Limited in April 2006 for the Vietnam market.

=== Walt Disney Studios Motion Pictures ===
In April 2007, Disney discontinued the usage of the Buena Vista brand in its distribution branding.

In early 2009, Disney entered a distribution agreement with a reorganized DreamWorks Pictures; the deal called for an estimated 30 films over a five-year period from DreamWorks and they would be released through the Touchstone banner. In 2011, GKIDS acquired the North American theatrical distribution rights of the Ghibli films, with Walt Disney Studios Home Entertainment retaining the home video rights until July 2017 when Shout! Factory took over the home video rights. However, Disney only handles home video distribution of the company's films in Japan and formerly Taiwan and China.

Disney's distribution deal with DreamWorks expired in August 2016, after the two studios decided to not renew their agreement on December 16, 2015, with Universal Pictures replacing Disney as DreamWorks' distributor. By the end of the deal, Disney had distributed 14 of DreamWorks's original 30-picture agreement; thirteen through Touchstone and one through Walt Disney Pictures. Disney took complete ownership rights of those 14 DreamWorks films from Amblin Partners in exchange for loans made to that company. The Light Between Oceans, the final film in that distribution deal, was also the last film released under Touchstone.

On December 14, 2017, the Walt Disney Company announced plans to purchase 21st Century Fox, which included 20th Century Fox and Fox Searchlight Pictures. On March 20, 2019, the acquisition of 21st Century Fox was completed. Following the reorganization and renaming of the acquired film units, Walt Disney Studios Motion Pictures began distributing 20th Century Studios films in the United States, while Searchlight continued to operate their autonomous distribution unit.

In late 2020 and early 2021, Disney reorganized the studio, placing it under the Disney Media and Entertainment Distribution unit which also oversees distribution to Disney+. Under this structure, the Theatrical Distribution unit oversaw the domestic and international films produced by all the studios within the Walt Disney Studios umbrella. In February 2023, returning CEO Bob Iger reversed this decision and reorganized the studio again, returning it as a division under the purview of The Walt Disney Studios.

== Distribution ==
Walt Disney Studios has produced or distributed 36 films that have received nominations for the Academy Award for Best Picture: fifteen from its former Miramax division, six from both Touchstone Pictures and Searchlight Pictures, (Note: In its history, Searchlight has produced or distributed 23 films that have received nominations for the Academy Award for Best Picture. Of these, however, only six (Jojo Rabbit, Nomadland, Nightmare Alley, The Banshees of Inisherin, Poor Things, and A Complete Unknown) have been released under Disney's ownership of the studio.) four from Walt Disney Pictures, three from 20th Century Studios, (Note: In its history, 20th Century has produced or distributed 64 films that have received nominations for the Academy Award for Best Picture. Of these, however, only three (Ford v Ferrari, West Side Story, and Avatar: The Way of Water) have been released under Disney's ownership of the studio.) two from Hollywood Pictures, and one from Marvel Studios. Of those nominated films, five films—Miramax's The English Patient, Shakespeare in Love, Chicago, No Country for Old Men, and Searchlight's Nomadland—have won Best Picture.

Walt Disney Studios Motion Pictures currently distributes films from across all units of Walt Disney Studios with the exception of Searchlight Pictures, which maintains its own autonomous distribution and marketing operations for releases in the United States and select markets. In addition, although 20th Century Studios' distribution unit was folded into Walt Disney Studios Motion Pictures in 2020, Disney omits any Disney-branding from the distribution of 20th Century Studios films. Other Disney film units and some third-party studios including:

| Walt Disney Studios | Active distribution deals | Former distribution deals |
|---|---|---|
| Walt Disney Pictures; Disneynature; Walt Disney Animation Studios (Note: Films produced by these studios are distributed through the Walt Disney Pictures banner.); Pixar; Marvel Studios; Lucasfilm; 20th Century Studios; 20th Century Family (Note: Films produced by these studios are distributed through the 20th Century Studios banner.); Searchlight Pictures; 20th Century Animation; Other Disney units: ABC Films; Disney+/Hulu (Note: International distribution only) Originals; Disney Original Documentary (Note: Limited theatrical releases only); Onyx Collective; Patagonik Film Group; Buena Vista International; Buena Vista International Film Productions (Germany) GmbH; ESPN Films (72%); National Geographic Documentary Films (73%); Star Studio18 (36%); A&E IndieFilms (50%); Former Disney units: Touchstone Pictures (1984–2016; closed); Hollywood Pictures (1990–2001, 2006–2007; closed); Caravan Pictures (1993–1999; closed); Disneytoon Studios (1990–2018; closed); 20th Digital Studio (2019—2023; dissolved); Blue Sky Studios (2019–2021; closed); Fox 2000 Pictures (2019–2020; dissolved); Miramax Films (1993–2010; sold); Dimension Films (1993–2005; sold); DIC Entertainment (1996–2000; sold); Buena Vista Film Sales (1997-2000; short-lived, dissolved and absorbed to Buena Vista International in September 2000); ImageMovers Digital (2009–2011; closed); UTV Motion Pictures (2012–2017; closed); Star Originals (2021–2025; merged into Hulu); Star Distribution (Note: Latin America distribution only) (1961–2026; retired); Star Original Productions (2019–2026; absorbed to the second incarnation of Buena Vista International); Miravista (2002–2019) | Gracie Films (2019—present); Scott Free Productions (1995–present); Gloria Sanchez Productions (2021 (Note: Gloria Sanchez Productions began a first-look deal with 20th Century Studios in 2021.)–present); Impossible Films (2025–present); Lightstorm Entertainment (2019 (Note: Lightstorm Entertainment began a first-look deal with 20th Century Fox in 1995. This deal was absorbed by Disney, when it acquired Fox in 2019.)–present); Original Film (2019–present); Mandeville Films (1996–present); Mayhem Pictures (2002–present); Panay Films | DreamWorks Pictures (Note: Films produced by DreamWorks were distributed through the Touchstone Pictures banner.) (2011–2016); Jerry Bruckheimer Films (1993–2014); Yash Raj Films (2006–2008); Chernin Entertainment (2019 (Note: Chernin Entertainment began a first-look deal with 20th Century Fox in 2009. This deal was absorbed by Disney, when it acquired Fox in 2019 and was subsequently ended the following year.)–2020); Cinergi Pictures (1993–1998; closed); Beacon Pictures (2002–2007); Studio Ghibli (North America; 1996–2014) (Note: After Disney acquired worldwide distribution rights to the Studio Ghibli library in 1996; excluding the UK which were handled by StudioCanal in the region until 2024; Disney produced the English dubs and released 15 of Ghibli's films through the Walt Disney Pictures, Buena Vista Home Video, Miramax and Touchstone Pictures banners. The North American theatrical rights to Studio Ghibli's film library were acquired by GKIDS from Disney in 2011. Disney continued to distribute the existing films they owned on home media (as well as The Wind Rises) until 2017, when GKIDS acquired home media rights to Ghibli's library, excluding The Wind Rises. The rights to that film reverted from Disney to GKIDS in 2020. Disney continues to distribute Studio Ghibli's film library in Taiwan (through Deltamac), China (through Excel Video) and Japan (through Happinet).); Vanguard Animation (2005); POW! Entertainment (2007–2014); Spyglass Entertainment (1998–2008); Blinding Edge Pictures (1998–2005); Locksmith Animation (2019–2021); Interscope Communications (1984–1996); First Floor Features (1997–2002, Benelux only); Shooting Star Filmcompany (1998–2004, Benelux only); Helkon Filmverleih (1999–2002, Germany only); Nijenhuis & de Levita Film & TV (2008–2010, Netherlands only); Universum Film (2005–2019, Germany only); New Regency Productions (2019 (Note: New Regency began a first-look deal with 20th Century Fox in 1997. This deal was absorbed by Disney, when it acquired Fox in 2019 and was subsequently renewed by Disney and New Regency in 2021.)–2026); Pathé (2020–2021, UK only) |

=== International distribution ===
Buena Vista International, Inc.
- Logo used 1993–present
- Trade name: Walt Disney Studios Motion Pictures International (for Disney branded films only); Buena Vista International (non-US, non-Disney, and non-Star Studio18 theatrical movies in countries outside the United States only)
- Industry: Film
- Founded: 1961; 65 years ago January 29, 2026; 9 months ago (relaunch in Latin America and Brazil)
- Founder: Walt Disney
- Defunct: February 11, 2022; 4 years ago (Latin American branch); November 3, 2022; 4 years ago (Brazilian branch)
- Successor: Walt Disney Studios Motion Pictures International (original); Star Distribution (Latin American and Brazilian branch successor until 2026)
- Headquarters: United States; Latin America; Portugal; Spain; Brazil
- Area served: Worldwide
- Parent: The Walt Disney Company Latin America; The Walt Disney Company Iberia; Walt Disney Studios Motion Pictures
- Divisions: Patagonik Film Group (33.3%); Buena Vista Film Sales (1997–2000); Miravista (2002–2019; joint venture with Telefónica España's Admira)

Star Distribution (Note: Star Distribution still uses the Buena Vista International name as legal name seen in the trailer of Un viaje al corazón: The Wingwalker.)
- Logo used 2022–2026
- Formerly: Buena Vista International Latin America (1961–2022); Buena Vista International Brazil (1961–2022)
- Type: Division
- Industry: Film
- Founded: 1961; 65 years ago
- Founder: Walt Disney
- Defunct: January 29, 2026; 9 months ago
- Headquarters: Malaver 550 Vicente López, Buenos Aires, Argentina
- Area served: Latin America
- Parent: The Walt Disney Company Latin America; Walt Disney Studios Motion Pictures
- Divisions: Patagonik Film Group (33.3%)

Buena Vista Film Sales, Inc.
- Trade name: Buena Vista Film Sales
- Type: Division
- Industry: Film
- Founded: October 1997; 29 years ago
- Defunct: September 19, 2000; 26 years ago
- Fate: Folded into Buena Vista International
- Headquarters: Walt Disney Studios Lot, 500 Buena Vista Street, Burbank, California, United States
- Area served: Worldwide
- Owner: The Walt Disney Company
- Parent: Buena Vista Pictures Distribution (via Buena Vista International)

Walt Disney Studios Motion Pictures International was formed in 1961 as Buena Vista International. On May 4, 1987, despite being industry rivals, Disney signed a theatrical distribution agreement with Warner Bros. International for the release of Disney and Touchstone films in many overseas markets except in Australia and New Zealand, where distribution went through Roadshow Distributors instead (due to Roadshow also theatrically distributing Warner Bros. films as well during this period), with Disney retaining full control of all distribution and marketing decisions on their product.

In 1992, Disney opted to end their joint venture with Warner Bros. to start autonomously distributing their films in these aforementioned overseas markets beginning with Aladdin and Sister Act. In those territories from 1993 to 2007, Disney reactivated the Buena Vista International name, and also sent distribution under it in these aforementioned overseas markets that did not have any current arrangements with other companies.

Italia Film, a Lebanese film distribution and production company, is Disney's exclusive theatrical film distribution partner for various Middle East and North Africa (MENA) markets since 1993, after making a deal directly with Buena Vista International at the time. Prior to this, Warner Bros. originally handled said MENA markets except in Israel where Buena Vista handled theatrical distribution by themselves.

In Taiwan, MGM first handled Disney's distribution, with 20th Century Fox and Warner Bros. later taking over. A local distributor called Era Communications took over distribution from 1992 to 1995. At that time, Buena Vista began its Taiwanese operations. Columbia ended its joint distribution unit with Fox and switched to Buena Vista in 1999.

Rights to Disney's films in West Germany were originally released by MGM, from 1973 to 1975 under their partnership with 20th Century Fox of Germany as Fox-MGM. From 1976 they were released to 20th Century Fox, when German MGM distribution was taken over by CIC, and then for a short time from Summer 1986 to United International Pictures before the Warner Bros. joint venture.

In September 2004, Buena Vista International announced they would begin to start theatrically distributing certain films from Universum Film in Germany and Austria beginning in February 2005, replacing a previous deal with United International Pictures. The deal ended in late 2019 after Universum was sold by the RTL Group to Tele München Group, who began to self-distribute releases afterwards under the Leonine Distribution name.

In Spain, Filmayer S.A. originally released Disney's movies, with Warner Española S.A. later taking over while Lauren Films handled theatrical distribution of Disney's movies in the Catalan language.

In the United Kingdom, Disney's movies were released through a collaboration of Disney and 20th Century Fox known as UK Film Distributors Ltd. before the Warner Bros. joint venture.

In Italy and Brazil, Disney's movies were distributed by Cinema International Corporation and United International Pictures before the Warner Bros. joint venture. Prior to that, Universal Pictures handled theatrical distribution of Disney's movies in Italy before going through CIC.

In Thailand, Sahamongkol Film International under the SM Major label serves as the Thai theatrical distributor of Disney's movies until 1997 when Sony Pictures took over theatrical distribution.

In Australia and New Zealand, Disney's movies were distributed initially by Metro-Goldwyn-Mayer, before distribution switched to British Empire Films (later Greater Union Film Distributors) following the merger of the Australian MGM cinema chains. In 1987, Greater Union merged with Village Roadshow and Roadshow Films took over distribution. The company begin distributing films in Australia and New Zealand in 1999 after its own distribution deal with Roadshow expired in 1998.

In January 2002, Disney's Buena Vista International team-up with Telefónica España's Admira to create and foundation of Miravista to make Latin American films released under the BVI label. Miravista was dissolved in 2019 following the release of Cinderela Pop.

In some other countries in Europe, such as Poland, Hungary, Portugal and the Czech Republic, Disney's movies were instead released through local distributors, such as Filmoteka Narodowa in Poland, InterCom Zrt. in Hungary, NOS Audiovisuais in Portugal and Guild Film Distribution in the Czech Republic respectively.

In October 1997, Disney launched Buena Vista Film Sales in order to the acquisition of indie films under Buena Vista International, On September 19, 2000, Disney dissolved the film sales division in the wake of the departure of executive vice president of acquisitions and business affairs Jere Hausfater.

Disney and Sony Pictures formed in 1997 a film distribution joint venture in Southeast Asia. By December 2006, 14 joint distribution ventures with Sony Pictures Releasing International were formed and exist in countries including Brazil, Mexico, Singapore, Thailand and the Philippines. In January 2007, their fifteenth such partnership began operations in Russia and CIS.

In February 2017, Sony starting leaving the Southeast Asia venture with the Philippines. In August 2017, Sony terminated the joint venture agreement for their own operations. In January 2019, in anticipation of the then-pending acquisition of the most 21st Century Fox assets (which includes 20th Century Fox), Disney agreed to sell its stake in the Mexican joint venture named Walt Disney Studios Sony Pictures, Releasing de México to Sony Pictures Releasing.

In Greece and Cyprus, Disney's movies are distributed through local distributor Feelgood Entertainment, which also distributes Sony Pictures films in those territories.

In Japan, to adapt Japan's theatrical and home media distribution model, Walt Disney Studios Motion Pictures Japan and Walt Disney Studios Home Entertainment Japan were merged as Walt Disney Studios Japan on March 1, 2010, the distribution unit was renamed Walt Disney Japan on November 22, 2016.

In Mainland China, due to its regulated policies on international film distribution, all of Disney's films in China are distributed by China Film Co., Ltd. and/or Huaxia Film Distribution, but Disney still hold all promotional rights of their films.

In February 2022, the Latin American branch of Buena Vista International was renamed Star Distribution, as the Star branding replaced the Buena Vista brand company-wide in the Latin American region by Disney Latin America.

In November 2022, the Brazilian branch of Buena Vista International was renamed Star Distribution following the dropping of the Buena Vista brand in the Latin American region in February 2022. The Buena Vista International name still used on Latin American and Brazilian prints of 20th Century/Searchlight titles.

In January 2026 via social media (Facebook, Instagram, X and YouTube), Disney retired the Star brand name in Latin America and Brazil in favor to the Hulu brand name. As the result, Star Distribution reverted to Buena Vista International. Star Original Productions was absorbed into the relaunched Buena Vista International label. Playa de Lobos (2026) was the first film released under the revived BVI label, while Se Eu Fosse Você 3 (2026) as the first film released under the revived BVI label in Brazil, and the first film to not be made by the international arm of 20th Century Studios.

As of 2026, United International Pictures continues to handle theatrical distribution of Disney's films, including those from Searchlight Pictures, in Turkey.

== Film library ==
=== Highest-grossing films ===
Walt Disney Studios Motion Pictures has released 36 (Note: This cumulative total includes three 20th Century Fox films that Disney has acquired the rights to since their original theatrical releases (Star Wars: Episode I – The Phantom Menace, Avatar, and the international rights to Titanic); Disney has directly distributed the other 33 films.) films that have crossed the $1 billion mark in worldwide grosses—the most of any major Hollywood studios—with twelve (Note: These twelve films include Avengers: Endgame, Avatar, Avatar: The Way of Water, Titanic, Star Wars: The Force Awakens, Avengers: Infinity War, Zootopia 2, Inside Out 2, The Lion King, The Avengers, Avatar: Fire and Ash, and Frozen 2.) of the twenty highest-grossing films of all time being distributed or owned by Disney; including the second highest-grossing film in North America (Star Wars: The Force Awakens) and the highest-grossing film worldwide (Avengers: Endgame). Of those twelve films, six of them have crossed the $2 billion mark in worldwide grosses, the most for any major studio.

In addition, Disney is the first of only three studios that have released at least two billion-dollar films in the same year, the others being Warner Bros. and Universal Pictures. Disney is the only studio that has achieved this nine times, in 2010, 2013, 2015, 2016, 2017, 2018, 2019, 2024, and 2025. 2016 included four $1 billion releases, and 2019 included seven $1 billion releases, both records for any studio. Disney has released seven of the top ten highest-grossing animated films, the highest-grossing G, PG, and PG-13-rated films of all time, and eighteen of the twenty highest-grossing G-rated films. Three of the top five opening weekends were Disney-distributed films.

In 2015, Disney achieved its largest yearly box-office gross worldwide at $5 billion and $2 billion in North America. In 2016, Disney surpassed $7 billion in worldwide yearly box-office gross—the first of any major studio—surpassing the previous 2015 record. In 2019, Disney became the first studio ever to have seven releases cross $1 billion each in a single year. In the same year, Disney broke the previous records by making an unprecedented $13.2 billion at the global box office.

† Indicates films playing in theaters in the week commencing 20 November 2026.

Highest-grossing films in North America
| Rank | Title | Year | Studio label | Box office gross (millions) |
|---|---|---|---|---|
| 1 | Star Wars: The Force Awakens | 2015 | Lucasfilm | $936.7 |
| 2 | Avengers: Endgame ^{‡} | 2019 | Marvel | $898.4 |
| 3 | Avatar ‡ | 2009 | 20th Century | $785.2 |
| 4 | Black Panther | 2018 | Marvel | $700.1 |
| 5 | Avatar: The Way of Water | 2022 | 20th Century | $688.5 |
| 6 | Avengers: Infinity War | 2018 | Marvel | $678.8 |
| 7 | Titanic ‡ | 1997 | 20th Century | $674.3 |
| 8 | Inside Out 2 | 2024 | Disney/Pixar | $653.2 |
| 9 | Deadpool & Wolverine | 2024 | Marvel | $636.7 |
| 10 | The Avengers | 2012 | Marvel | $623.4 |
| 11 | Star Wars: The Last Jedi | 2017 | Lucasfilm | $620.2 |
| 12 | Incredibles 2 | 2018 | Disney/Pixar | $605.6 |
| 13 | The Lion King | 2019 | Disney | $543.6 |
| 14 | Rogue One: A Star Wars Story | 2016 | Lucasfilm | $532.2 |
| 15 | Star Wars: The Rise of Skywalker | 2019 | Lucasfilm | $515.2 |
| 16 | Beauty and the Beast | 2017 | Disney | $504.0 |
| 17 | Star Wars: Episode I – The Phantom Menace ‡ | 1999 | 20th Century/Lucasfilm | $487.6 |
| 18 | Finding Dory | 2016 | Disney/Pixar | $486.3 |
| 19 | Toy Story 5 | 2026 | Disney/Pixar | $480.2 |
| 20 | Frozen 2 | 2019 | Disney | $477.4 |
| 21 | Moana 2 | 2024 | Disney | $460.0 |
| 22 | Avengers: Age of Ultron | 2015 | Marvel | $459.0 |
| 23 | Black Panther: Wakanda Forever | 2022 | Marvel | $453.8 |
| 24 | Toy Story 4 | 2019 | Disney/Pixar | $434.0 |
| 25 | Zootopia 2 | 2025 | Disney | $428.1 |

Highest-grossing films worldwide
| Rank | Title | Year | Studio label | Box office gross (millions) |
|---|---|---|---|---|
| 1 | Avengers: Endgame ^{‡} | 2019 | Marvel | $2,942.2 |
| 2 | Avatar ‡ | 2009 | 20th Century | $2,923.7 |
| 3 | Avatar: The Way of Water | 2022 | 20th Century | $2,334.5 |
| 4 | Titanic ‡ | 1997 | 20th Century | $2,256.1 |
| 5 | Star Wars: The Force Awakens | 2015 | Lucasfilm | $2,071.3 |
| 6 | Avengers: Infinity War | 2018 | Marvel | $2,052.4 |
| 7 | Zootopia 2 | 2025 | Disney | $1,870.3 |
| 8 | Inside Out 2 | 2024 | Disney/Pixar | $1,699.9 |
| 9 | The Lion King | 2019 | Disney | $1,656.9 |
| 10 | The Avengers | 2012 | Marvel | $1,520.5 |
| 11 | Avatar: Fire and Ash | 2025 | 20th Century | $1,490.3 |
| 12 | Frozen 2 | 2019 | Disney | $1,453.6 |
| 13 | Avengers: Age of Ultron | 2015 | Marvel | $1,405.4 |
| 14 | Black Panther | 2018 | Marvel | $1,349.9 |
| 15 | Deadpool & Wolverine | 2024 | Marvel | $1,338.0 |
| 16 | Star Wars: The Last Jedi | 2017 | Lucasfilm | $1,334.4 |
| 17 | Frozen | 2013 | Disney | $1,290.0 |
| 18 | Beauty and the Beast | 2017 | Disney | $1,266.1 |
| 19 | Incredibles 2 | 2018 | Disney/Pixar | $1,243.0 |
| 20 | Iron Man 3 | 2013 | Marvel | $1,215.8 |
| 21 | Captain America: Civil War | 2016 | Marvel | $1,155.0 |
| 22 | Toy Story 5 | 2026 | Disney/Pixar | $1,149.1 |
| 23 | Captain Marvel | 2019 | Marvel | $1,131.4 |
| 24 | Star Wars: The Rise of Skywalker | 2019 | Lucasfilm | $1,077.0 |
| 25 | Toy Story 4 | 2019 | Disney/Pixar | $1,073.3 |

^{‡}—Includes theatrical reissue(s)
