= Os Dedinhos =

Studio album by Eliana
- Released: May 10, 1993
- Genre: Children's music Pop music
- Language: Portuguese language
- Label: BMG, RCA

Eliana chronology
Os Dedinhos (1993)	Eliana (1994)

Os Dedinhos (English: The Little Fingers) is the debut studio album from TV show presenter and singer Eliana, released by BMG on May 10, 1993.

== Released ==
Os Dedinhos (English: The Dedinhos), was released as a long-playing vinyl record, cassette and compact disc on May 10, 1993.

== Background ==
In 1991, Eliana began work as a youth presenter for SBT on the program Festolândia which lasted only three months. That same year, she was invited by the SBT to present another children's program, called "Drawing Session", and it was there that the first single from this album came about. The song "El Dedinhos" was composed by Eliana herself; she says that since she appeared only from the waist up with no background or dancers, she needed to create choreography that could be done seated. This led her to use her fingers, which made a great success at the time, being one of the few children's songs to be broadcast on the country's radios. In 1993 the song "Amiga", one of the singles of the album, came as the opening theme of the telenovela Muchachitas shown by SBT in the same year.

=== Bom Dia & Companhia (English: Good Morning Company) and Album Launch ===
In 1993, Drawing Session was cancelled, giving rise to Good Day & Company (SBT), which premiered August 2 of that year. Good Day and Company was where the album had continuity, and thus could be released to the entirety of Brazil in the form of LPs and cassettes. Years later the album would be released on additional platforms such as CD and Digital Download by the BMG label.

== Singles ==
The singles "Era Uma Vez" and "Abracadabra", from the now-defunct first show, made the track listing and were released as singles. Another successful song taken from the disc was "Rebú no Pomar do Japonês"

== Track listing ==
1. "Os Dedinhos"
2. "Fui Mora Numa Casinha/Bate Palmas"
3. "O Sapo Não Lavar o Pé/Do-Ré-Mi-Fá-Sol-Lá-Si"
4. "Os Sentidos/O Jipe do Padre"
5. "Dona Aranha/Os Indiozinhos"
6. "Amiga (English: Friend)"
7. "Era uma Vez"
8. "Direito de Sonhar"
9. "Abracadabra"
10. "Rebu no Pomar do Japonês"
