= Marianna Alexandre =

Brazilian actress (born 2001)

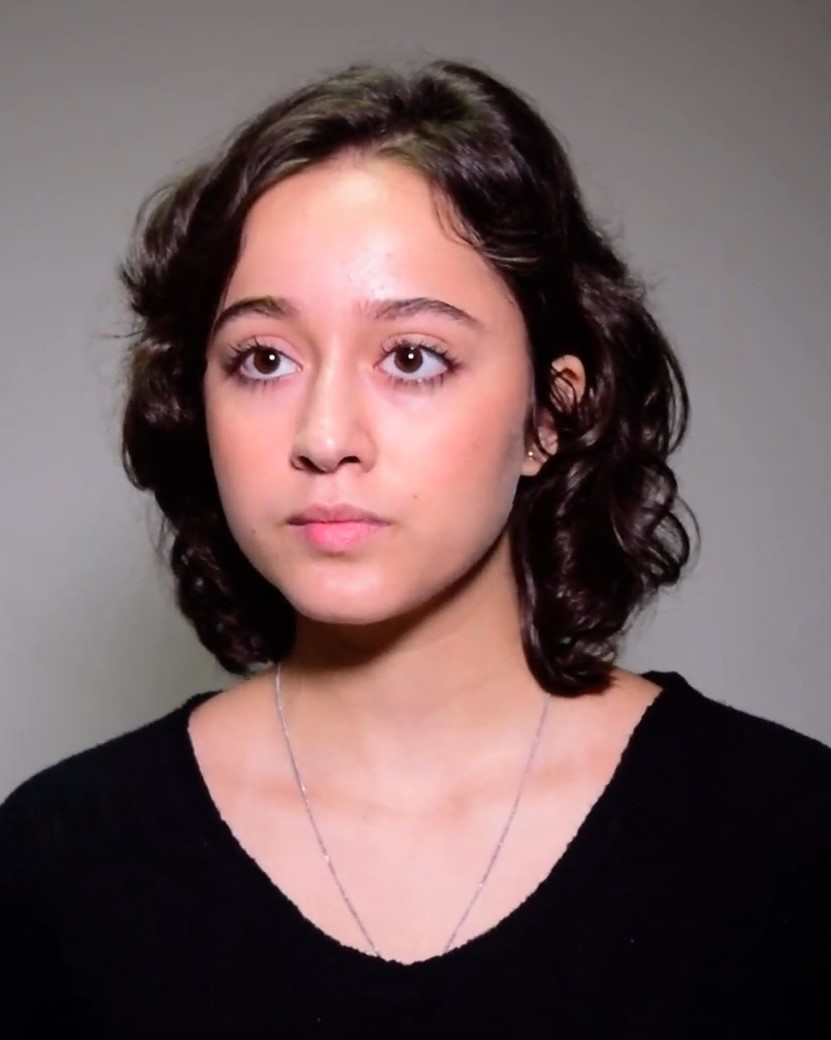
- Marianna in 2019.
- Born: Marianna Vianna Alexandre; 6 March 2001; Rio de Janeiro, Brazil
- Occupations: Actress; singer; digital influencer
- Years active: 2014–present
- Awards: Prêmio Contigo! Online 2021 (2021 Contigo! Online Award) – TV Breakthrough

Marianna Vianna Alexandre (born 6 March 2001), professionally credited as Marianna Alexandre (Brazilian Portuguese pronunciation: [maˈɾjɐnɐ aˌleksˈɐ̃dɾi]), is a Brazilian actress and singer. She provides the Brazilian Portuguese voice of the title character, Wednesday Addams, in the Netflix series Wednesday, originally portrayed by American actress Jenna Ortega.

In 2021, she won the Prêmio Contigo! Online in the category of Revelação da TV (TV Breakthrough) for her role as Amarilis in the Brazilian soap opera Gênesis, produced by Record.

== Biography ==
=== Early life ===
When she was six years old, she started in music by participating in a choir, playing the piano, and taking early music lessons. In 2013, while studying at the Brasília Music School, Marianna was invited by a production company to audition for a film. After attending an acting workshop, she filmed the feature O Outro Lado do Paraíso . She only came into contact with theater at the age of 12, performing in plays such as Se Meu Apartamento Falasse (The Apartment) and A Noviça Rebelde (The Sound of Music).

=== Career ===
As a voice actress, her first works were released in August 2016, providing the Brazilian Portuguese voice for Margaret Hodgson (originally played by Lauren Esposito) in the film The Conjuring 2, and Amelia Duckworth (originally played by DeVore Ledridge) in the series Bizaardvark.

She launched her singing career with her debut single "Cor de Mel" in October 2020. The following month, she began using the social media platform TikTok, where she discovered the POV (point of view) video format, featuring short stories focused on acting. Her first video of this type reached 15,000 views, and due to its success, she created numerous videos in the same style. In just two years, she amassed over 2 million followers on the platform.

In May 2022, her second single, "Timbre Imperfeito", was released. Her next musical release, "Game Over", came out in August. That same month, she made her television debut in the Record telenovela Gênesis, portraying Amarilis, the Egyptian princess and sister of the Pharaoh, and she played Celly Campello in the film Um Broto Legal, which tells the story of the artist. In November, she released the song "Simplesmente Eu". In December, she provided the Brazilian Portuguese voice for Wednesday Addams (originally played by Jenna Ortega) in the Netflix series Wednesday.

She returned to Record in 2023, portraying the Egyptian character Merit in the telenovela Reis. In June, she played Milla in the film Mallandro, o Errado Que Deu Certo.

== Filmography ==
=== Film ===
Year	Title	Role	Ref.
2022	O Outro Lado do Paraíso	Unidentified Character	
2022	Um Broto Legal	Celly Campello	
2024	Mallandro, o Errado Que Deu Certo	Mila	

=== Television ===
Year	Title	Role	Ref.
2021	Gênesis	Amarilis	
2023	Reis	Merit	

== Voice acting ==
=== Film ===
Year	Title	Role	Actress	Notes	Ref.
2016	The Conjuring 2	Margaret Hodgson	Christopher Lloyd	Brazilian Portuguese dub	
2017	Spider-Man: Homecoming	Cindy	Tiffany Espensen	Brazilian Portuguese dub	
2021	The Fallout	Vada	Jenna Ortega	Brazilian Portuguese dub	
2024	Beetlejuice Beetlejuice	Astrid Deetz	Jenna Ortega	Brazilian Portuguese dub	

=== Series ===
Year	Title	Role	Actress	Notes	Ref.
2019–2021	Gabby Duran & The Unsittables	Gabby Duran	Kylie Cantrall	Brazilian Portuguese dub	
2022–present	Wednesday	Wednesday Addams	Jenna Ortega	Brazilian Portuguese dub	

=== Animations ===
Year	Role	Apparitions	Notes	Ref.
2019	Rani	The Lion Guard	Brazilian Portuguese dub	

== Discography ==
=== Singles ===
==== As lead artist ====
Title	Year	Album
"Cor de Mel"	2020	Non-album single
"Timbre Imperfeito"	2022	Non-album single
"Game Over"	2022	Non-album single
"Simplesmente Eu"	2022	Non-album single

== Awards and nominations ==
Award	Year	Recipient(s) and nominee(s)	Category	Result	Ref.
Prêmio Contigo! Online	2021	Amarilis in Gênesis	Revelação da TV (TV Breakthrough)	Won	
