= GadgetGang in Outer Space =

2017 animated film

- Brazilian theatrical release poster
- Brazilian Portuguese: BugiGangue no Espaço
- Directed by: Ale McHaddo
- Written by: Ale McHaddo
- Produced by: Ale McHaddo; Carolina Fratinni; Guilerme Machado de Sá; Melina Manasseh.
- Starring: Danilo Gentili; Maisa Silva; Rogério Morgado; Guilherme Briggs; Luiz Carlos Persy
- Music by: Alexandre Guerra
- Production company: 44 Toons!
- Distributed by: Imagem Filmes
- Release date: February 23, 2017 (Brazil)
- Running time: 85 minutes
- Country: Brazil
- Languages: Portuguese; English
- Budget: R$ 5 million

GadgetGang in Outer Space (Portuguese: BugiGangue no Espaço) is a 2017 Brazilian animated science fiction comedy film directed and written by Ale McHaddo. It was produced by McHaddo, Carolina Fratinni, Guilerme Machado de Sá and Melina Manasseh. The film was released in Brazilian cinemas on 23 February 2017 by Imagem Filmes and was later released in United States on DVD on July 4, 2017.

== Synopsis ==
When a spaceship crashes to Earth and reveals a group of quirky little aliens on the run for their lives, the GadgetGang members Gregorio, Phoebe, Sheldon, Mitsue, Mary Ann, Banana, and Tank soon discover this won't be the boring weekend they had dreaded. They learn that in a point far from the galaxy, an evil warlord named Gana Golber has seized control of the Confederation of Planets and now all of the planets are in danger, including Earth.

== Production ==
With the screenplay originally written in 2005. The production begin in 2012 and ended in 2016 with a budget of 5 million reais, while most of the production was McHaddo's own studio in São Paulo, rendering and compositing was carried by Studio56 in Bangalore. The film was animated on Maya with rendering on Arnold, the voice acting was originally recorded in English by Audioworks at New York.

The soundtrack was composed by Alexandre Guerra and the Budapest Symphony Orchestra. It was later signed to the record label Tratore.
