= Carlo Porto =

Brazilian actor and model

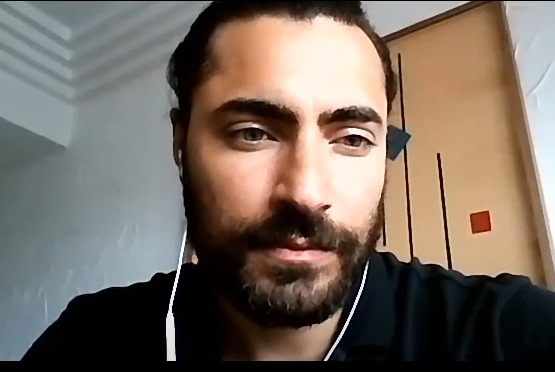
- Born: Carlyle Oliveira Porto; September 5, 1981 (age 43); Governador Valadares, Brazil
- Occupation(s): Actor, model
- Years active: 2008–present

Carlyle Oliveira Porto (born September 5, 1981) is an actor and Brazilian model.

== Biography ==
At age 15, he moved with his family to Salvador and with 23 lived in São Paulo, where he currently lives. He has also served as a model and stamped several fashion magazines and advertising campaigns.

His first television appearance was in Rede Globo, in 2008, when he made a special appearance in the series Casos e Acasos, as Eliseu.

He has also made special guest appearances in the novel Caras e Bocas (2009) and in the series A Vida Alheia (2010). He lived the character Vitorio Emanuele in the novel Passione, in 2010, Nikko in "Salve Jorge", which aired in 2013, and Dr. Eduardo Tavares in Alto Astral.

In 2016 Carlo Porto, won the role of adult protagonist in Carinha de Anjo, novel of the SBT. In the plot, lives the personage Gustavo Larios a man traumatized with the fatal accident of Tereza, (Lucero) his great love, then decides to maintain the daughter in a boarding school and under the care of the cousin Estefânia (Priscilla Sol).

In 2018, he participated in the series Onde Nascem os Fortes interpreting the character Cecílio, affair of Rosinete, lived by Debora Bloch. In the same year he leverages his international career, with a debut in the first year of his career. Portuguese novel Alma e Coração where it interprets Luis Carvalhais.

== Filmography ==
=== Television ===
Year	Title	Role
2008	Casos e Acasos	Eliseu
2009	Caras e Bocas	Leo
2010	A Vida Alheia	Tadeu Bertini
2010	Passione	Vitorio Emanuele
2010	Dalva e Herivelto: uma Canção de Amor	Antoninho
2011	Lara com Z	Alexandre Viana
2011	Insensato Coração	Miguel
2012	Aquele Beijo	Eduardo
2012	Salve Jorge	Nikko
2014	Alto Astral	Dr. Eduardo Tavares
2016	Carinha de Anjo	Gustavo Lário
2016	Máquina da Fama	Himself
2018	Bake Off SBT	Himself
2018	Onde Nascem os Fortes	Cecílio
2018	Alma e Coração	Luís Carvalhais
2021	Gênesis	Adam
2022	Reis	Saul, King of Israel
2024	A Rainha da Pérsia	Xerxes I, King of Pérsia

=== Film ===
Year	Title	Role
2018	Finding Josef	Unknown
2010	Kabbalah	Boyfriend

=== Internet ===
Year	Title	Role
2013	Positivos	Hernandes

== Awards and nominations ==
Year	awards	Category	Indicated work	Result
2017	Troféu Internet de 2017	Best Actor	Carinha de Anjo	Nominated
2018	Troféu Internet de 2018	Best Actor	Carinha de Anjo	Nominated
2018	Prêmio Jovem Brasileiro 2018	Best Actor	Carinha de Anjo	Nominated
