= Priscila Sol =

Brazilian actress (born 1980)

- Born: Priscila Sol; 14 April 1980 (age 46); São Paulo, SP, Brazil
- Occupation: Actress
- Years active: 2007–present

Priscila Sol (born 14 April 1980, in São Paulo) is a Brazilian actress.

== Career ==
Priscila Sol played some roles in TV and Cinema.

=== Television ===
Year	Title	Character	TV station
2008	Água na Boca	Renée	Rede Bandeirantes
2009	Descolados	Clara	MTV
2009–2010	Viver a Vida	Thelma Paixão	Rede Globo
2012–2013	Lado a Lado	Sandra Praxedes	Rede Globo
2014	A Segunda Vez	Ariela	Multishow
2014	O Negócio	Fake Karin	HBO Brasil
2016	Lili, a Ex	Renata	GNT
2016–2018	Carinha de Anjo	Estefânia Lários "Tia Perucas"	SBT
2019	Ninguém Tá Olhando	Young Débora	Netflix
2023	Marcelo Marmelo Martelo	Laura Marmelo	Paramount+

=== Cinema ===
Year	Title	Director	Character
2007	O Magnata	Johnny Araújo	Rê
2010	E o Sol Brilhou sobre o Verde	Andre Barmak	Manu
2012	Lost Night		Patricia
2014	Apneia		Katy
2014	Catarse		Amanda
2015	Luz		Marina
2017	Laura	Jonathan Murphy	Laura
