= Tudum =

Netflix pop culture event

- Status: Active
- Genre: Multigenre
- Begins: January 25, 2020; 6 years ago
- Frequency: Annually
- Venue: Ibirapuera Park (Q1 2020); (Q2 2023); Online only (2020–2022); Kia Forum (2025)
- Locations: São Paulo, Brazil (Q1 2020); (Q2 2023); Los Angeles, USA (2025)
- Years active: 6
- Inaugurated: January 25, 2020; 6 years ago
- Most recent: May 31, 2025; 17 months ago
- Organizer: Netflix
- Website: Official event website

Tudum: A Global Fan Event, also known as Netflix Tudum, Tudum Festival or simply as Tudum, is a global pop culture event that covers Netflix's original films and television series held annually in São Paulo, Brazil (except from the 2nd to the 4th editions, which had an online format due to the COVID-19 pandemic) until 2025, when it was held in Los Angeles.

Held for the first time in January 2020, the event brought singers and actors from Netflix to promote new work, meet, and play with the Brazilian public. In 2025, the event shifted to target the general Netflix global audience. The name of the event comes from the onomatopoetic word that refers to the sound trademark of Netflix (/tədʌm/).

== History ==
=== In-person format ===
==== First edition ====
The first edition, in January 2020, was held in São Paulo, Brazil, with a public of over 50,000 people during the four days and big names from the original Netflix productions such as Lana Condor, Noah Centineo, Larissa Manoela and Jottapê, with concerts by Brazilian pop stars Anavitória, Melim, Projota, Kevin o Chris, Gretchen and Tropkillaz. The event brought together sets from various series, such as Stranger Things, Sex Education and Sintonia, so that the public had an immersive experience and could feel part of their favorite series.

=== Online format ===
==== Second edition ====
The second edition, in November 2020, was carried out entirely online, given the circumstances of social distancing and quarantine caused by the COVID-19 pandemic. Netflix decided to create an online version of the festival hosted by the Brazilian multimedia Maisa Silva and names of their original productions such as Ashley Park, Lucas Bravo, Joel Courtney and Leah Lewis with concerts by Brazilian starts Marília Mendonça, Pabllo Vittar, Emicida, Jottapê and Mila. The event also gained an Almanac version that was distributed physically and digitally, with the aim of expanding the event and covering the entire national territory. Netflix held the virtual edition for free as well as distributing 100,000 copies of an almanac with several stories, games and activities about the series and movies.

==== Third edition ====
The third edition, in September 2021, was named "Tudum: A Global Fan Event", an online event that includes audiences from other countries. The event was broadcast on YouTube, Facebook and Twitch on September 25.

==== Fourth edition ====
The event was broadcast on September 24, 2022.

=== Mixed format ===
==== Fifth edition ====
The event took place from June 16 to 18, 2023. It returned to the face-to-face format of the first edition, taking place again in the Ibirapuera Park, in São Paulo; but with a simultaneous live global online broadcasting on YouTube of the outdoors main panel in June 17, hosted one more time by Maisa Silva, but now accompanied by co-hosts Outer Banks' Chase Stokes and Never Have I Ever's Maitreyi Ramakrishnan. It brought big names from the original Netflix productions such as Chris Hemsworth, Arnold Schwarzenegger, Benedict Wong, Zack Snyder, Gal Gadot and Henry Cavill, as well as the main cast of One Piece.

==== Sixth edition ====
The 2025 edition was held on May 31 at the Kia Forum in Greater Los Angeles, United States and was the first time that the event had a more global perspective. Unlike the previous editions, the event was broadcast live by Netflix. Lady Gaga performed at the event, and Cookie Monster from Sesame Street appeared in the event to promote the upcoming 56th season.

#	Year	Location	Host	Musical Guests
1	2020	Ibirapuera Park	-	Anavitória, Melim, Projota, Kevin o Chris, Gretchen and Tropkillaz
2	2020	Online	Maisa Silva	Marília Mendonça, Pabllo Vittar, Emicida, Jottapê and Mil
3	2021	Online	-	
4	2022	-	-	
5	2023	Ibirapuera Park	Maisa Silva, Chase Stokes	
6	2025	Kia Forum	Sofia Carson	Lady Gaga, Hanumankind

== Tudum (website) ==
On December 9, 2021, Netflix announced the launch of Tudum.com, an official companion website named after the annual event, a public relations service offering news, lists, interviews, editorials, and behind-the-scenes videos for its television shows and films.

== See also ==
- D23
- DC FanDome
