= Double Dad =

2021 Brazilian film

- Film poster
- Portuguese: Pai em Dobro
- Directed by: Cris D'Amato
- Written by: Renato Fagundes; Thalita Rebouças
- Starring: Maisa Silva; Eduardo Moscovis; Marcelo Médici
- Production company: A Fabrica
- Distributed by: Netflix
- Release date: January 15, 2021
- Running time: 103 minutes
- Country: Brazil
- Language: Portuguese

Double Dad (Portuguese: Pai em Dobro) is a 2021 Brazilian comedy-drama film directed by Cris D'Amato, written by Renato Fagundes and Thalita Rebouças and starring Maisa Silva, Eduardo Moscovis and Marcelo Médici.

== Plot ==
Vicenza is a sweet and spiritual teenager, raised in a hippie community far from the hustle and bustle of the city, where she lives in harmony with nature, away from cell phone signals and urban pollution.

On Vincenza's 18th birthday, like every year, she again asks her mother Raion to reveal the identity of her biological father. She feels an essential part of her life is missing, a mystery Raion always avoids revealing. As always, she refuses to tell her, with yet another excuse as to why.

Vincenza has been working on her self-portrait, but believes she cannot finish it as she does not really know herself. She pleads with another commune member to help convince Raion to give her the information, but the older woman says Raion will not relent for anyone.

After Raion leaves for India, Vicenza finds the name Paco on the back of her pregnancy photo. So, she seizes the opportunity to escape the community and head to Rio de Janeiro in search of the father she has never met. There, Vincenza finds the artist Paco, saying she is looking for classes.

Vincenza stays at a boarding house run by the family of Cadu, the grandson of the owner, with whom she ends up falling in love. During her search, she meets two possible fathers: Paco, a free-spirited, dreamy artist in crisis, and Giovanne, a down-to-earth banker and businessman.

Determined to uncover her origins, Vicenza embarks on a journey that goes far beyond what she imagined, finding not just one, but two men who could be her father—and, in the process, also finding her own path in life.[4]

== Cast ==
- Maisa Silva as Vicenza
- Eduardo Moscovis as Paco
- Marcelo Médici as Giovanne
- Laila Zaid as Raion
- Caio Vegatti as Nando
- Pedro Ottoni as Cadu
- Rayana Diniz as Betina
- Fafá de Belém as Mother Moon
- Thaynara OG as Lucinha
- Roberto Bonfim as Arthur
- Flávia Garrafa as Jade
- Raquel Fabbri as Marta
- João Pydd as Rael
- Felipe Rodrigues as Guilherme
- Thalita Rebouças as Receptionist

== Release ==
The film was digitally released on January 15, 2021 by Netflix.
