= Carinha de Anjo =

Brazilian children's telenovela

- Genre: Telenovela; Romantic comedy
- Created by: Leonor Corrêa
- Based on: Carita de ángel by Kary Fajer
- Written by: Íris Abravanel; Leonor Corrêa; Natalia Piserni
- Directed by: Ricardo Mantoanelli; João Batista; Mário Moraes; Roberto Menezes; Vanessa Arruda
- Starring: Lorena Queiroz; Bia Arantes; Carlo Porto; Lucero; Priscila Sol; Dani Gondim; Karin Hils; Eliana Guttman; Alcemar Vieira; Maisa Silva; Jean Paulo Campos; Ângela Dip; Blota Filho; Eddie Coelho; Camilla Camargo; see more
- Theme music composer: María Teresa Bojalil
- Opening theme: Carinha de Anjo by Lucero
- Ending theme: Carinha de Anjo by Lucero
- Country of origin: Brazil
- Original language: Portuguese
- No. of episodes: 403 (290 International version)

Production
- Production location: CDT da Anhanguera - Osasco - Brazil
- Cinematography: Élvio Guedes
- Running time: 45 minutes
- Production company: SBT

Original release
- Network: SBT
- Release: November 21, 2016 – June 6, 2018

Related
- Carita de ángel

Carinha de Anjo (lit. Angel Face) is a Brazilian children's telenovela created by Leonor Corrêa and written by Íris Abravanel, originally broadcast by SBT from November 21, 2016 to June 6, 2018. It is a based on the 2000 Mexican telenovela Carita de ángel.

The plot features Lorena Queiroz, Bia Arantes, Carlo Porto, Priscila Sol, Dani Gondim, Karin Hils, Eliana Guttman and Lucero in the lead roles. Also in the other roles are Sienna Belle, Renata Randel, Maisa Silva and Jean Paulo Campos.

== Plot ==
After two years enrolled in a Catholic boarding school in Europe, five-year-old Dulce Maria reunites with her father Gustavo Larios, a successful businessman who's finally recovered from his wife's death. Gustavo is determined to restart his life with Dulce Maria along with his new girlfriend Nicole, a woman only interested in his wealth. Dulce Maria rejects the idea of Gustavo and Nicole's relationship and takes refuge in the arms of Cecilia, a nun that fills Dulce Maria's motherly void. Dulce Maria dreams that her father and Cecilia fall in love, and with Gustavo's ingenuity, fantasy slowly turns into a reality, even when Cecilia is divided between her faith and feelings.

== Cast ==
=== Children ===
Actor/Actress	Character
Lorena Queiroz	Dulce Maria Rezende Lários
Maisa Silva	Juliana Almeida (Juju)
Jean Paulo Campos	José Carlos de Oliveira (Zeca)
Sienna Belle	Frida Bastos
Renata Randel	Bárbara Guerra Smith
Gabriel Miller	Emílio Almeida
Leonardo Oliveira	José Felipe de Oliveira (Zé Felipe)
Kaleb Figueiredo	Luciano Bastos
Marianna Santos	Adriana Figueiredo
Duda Silva	Maria Eduarda (Duda)
Helena Luz	Lúcia Junqueira
Valenthina Rodarte	Valenthina
Brenda Santiago	Brenda
Manuela Fernandes	Fernanda
Isa Nakahara	Isabela
Jasmim Sabino	Jasmim
Lara Fanganielo	Lara
Giovanna Nasser	Giovanna (Geo)
Juju Mattos	Ana Júlia
Manuela Dieguez	Débora
Luiza Aguirre	Luiza
Manuela Munhoz	Manuela
Mariana Amor	Mariana
Sofia Rigoni	Ana Sofia

=== Adults ===
Actor/Actress	Character
Bia Arantes	Irmã Cecília Santos
Carlo Porto	Gustavo Lários
Dani Gondim	Nicole Escobar
Priscila Sol	Estefânia Lários (Tia Perucas)
Daniel Aldim	Leonardo Lários
Lucero	Teresa Rezende Lários
Blota Filho	Silvestre Moreira
Carol Loback	Franciely da Silva
Ângela Dip	Rosana Almeida
Karin Hils	Irmã Fabiana Teixeira
Camilla Camargo	Diana de Oliveira
Alcemar Vieira	Padre Gabriel Lários
Eddie Coelho	Inácio de Oliveira
Bruna Ximenes	Irmã Rita
Renata Brás	Irmã Bene
Eduardo Pelizzari	Flávio Escobar
Rai Teichimam	Fátima Santos
Bruno Lopes	Dr. André Renato Vieira
Carlos Mariano	Policial Ribeiro
Elisa Brites	Verônica Matias
Guilherme Gorski	Cristóvão Valdez
Cristina Mutarelli	Solange Ortiz
Laryssa Dias	Irmã Luzia
Thiago Mendonça	Vitor Gamboa
Rachel Rennhack	Irmã Ana
Sílvia Franceschi	Silvana Soares
Gabriela Petry	Selene
Fran Maya	Miller
Ângela Figueiredo	Regina
Stella Miranda	Noêmia Medeiros
Márcia Manfredini	Genuína da Rocha
Rodolfo Valente	Ricardo Ávila
Ana Vitória Bastos	Beatriz Rossi
Bárbara Maia	Cassandra
Carolina Manica	Paula
Mylla Christie	Drª. Alessandra
Diego Cristo	Osmar
Gabriel Muglia	Tom Caldeiras
Daniel Alvim	Leonardo
Eduardo Semerjian	Murilo
Sill Esteves	Micheli Medeiros
Marlei Cevada	Papagaio
Henrique Stroeter	Coruja
Luiz Araújo	Valter
Willian Mello	Dr. Jairo
Einat Falbel	Érica
Gustavo Vaz	Marcelo
Bernardo Bibancos	Rogério
Luiz Guilherme	Adolfo Lários
Clarice Niskier	Haydee Escobar
Eliana Guttman	Maristela Lopes (Madre Superiora)
José Rubens Chachá	Delegado Peixoto
Camilo Bevilacqua	Pascoal Gomes

=== Gallery ===
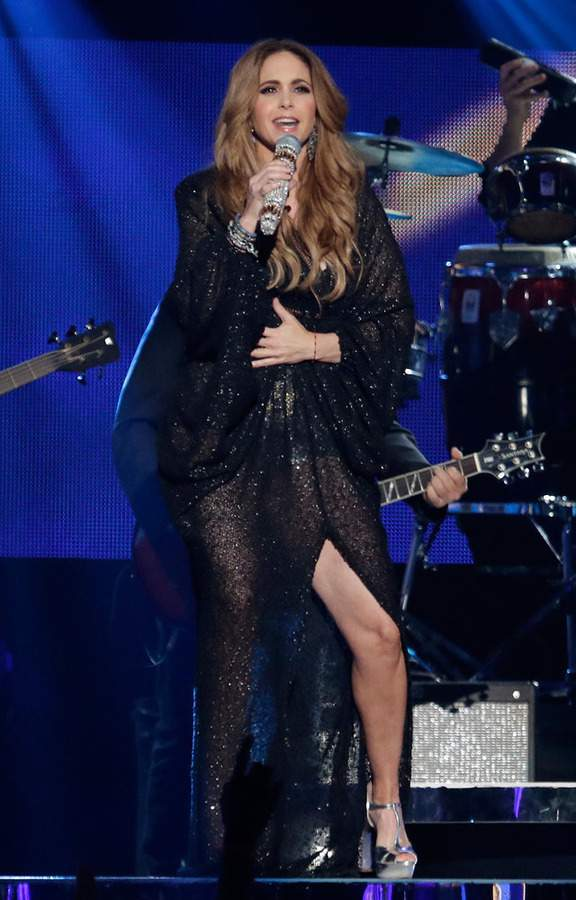
Lucero portrays Teresa.

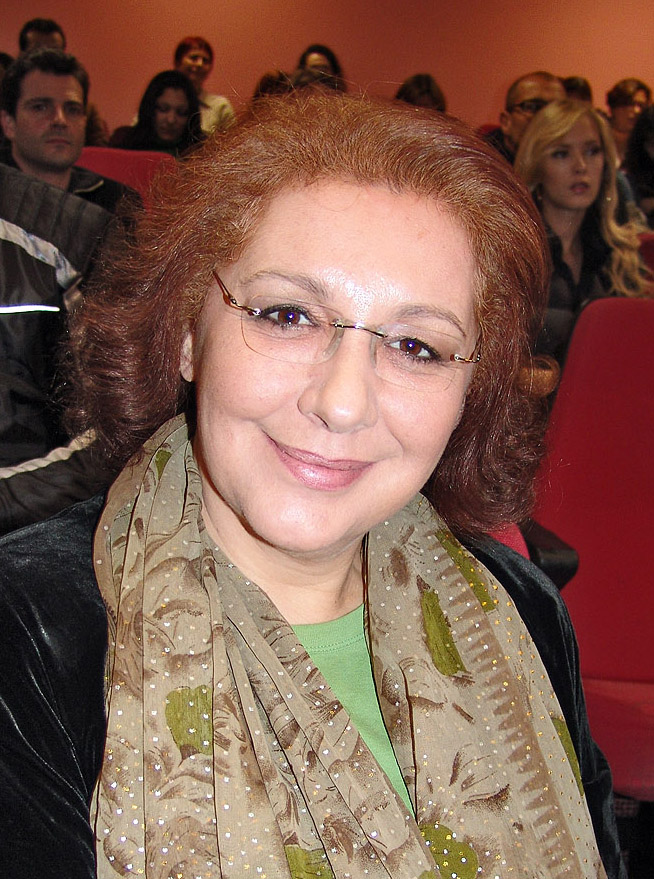
Eliana Guttman portrays Madre Superiora.

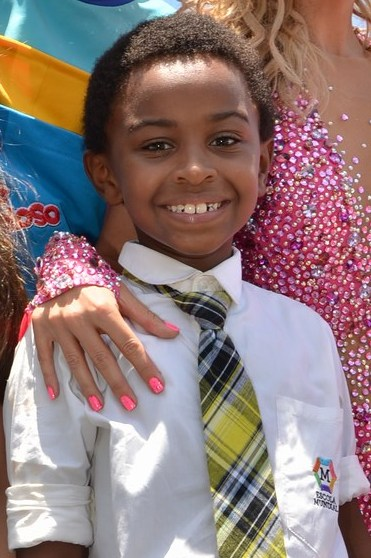
Jean Paulo Campos portrays Zeca.

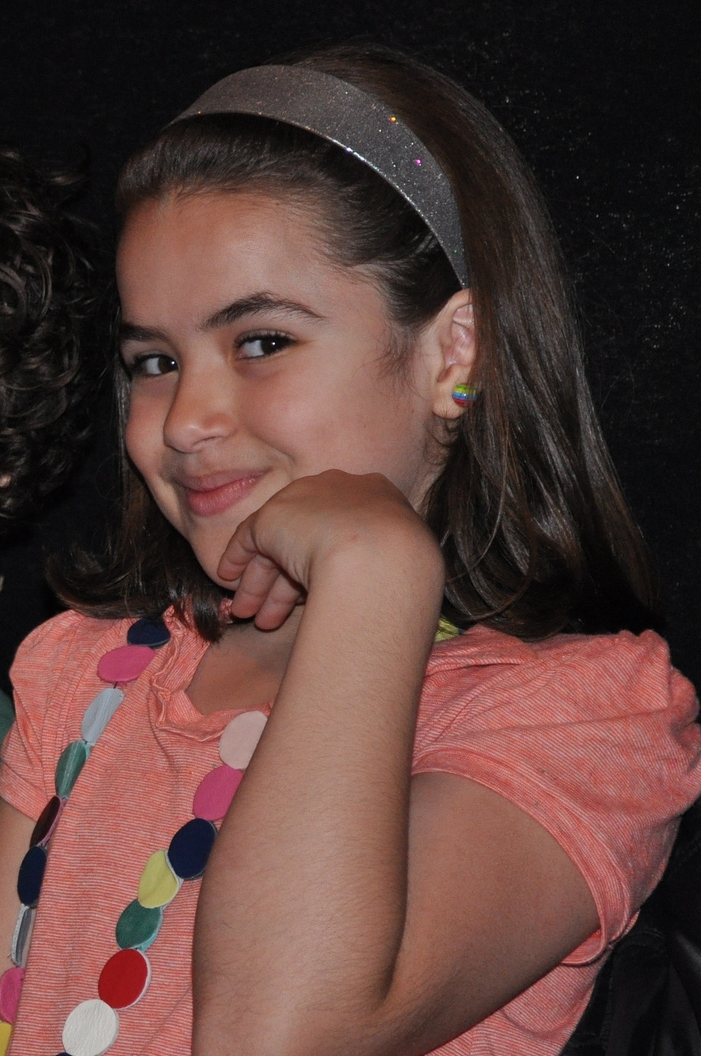
Maisa Silva portrays Juju Almeida.

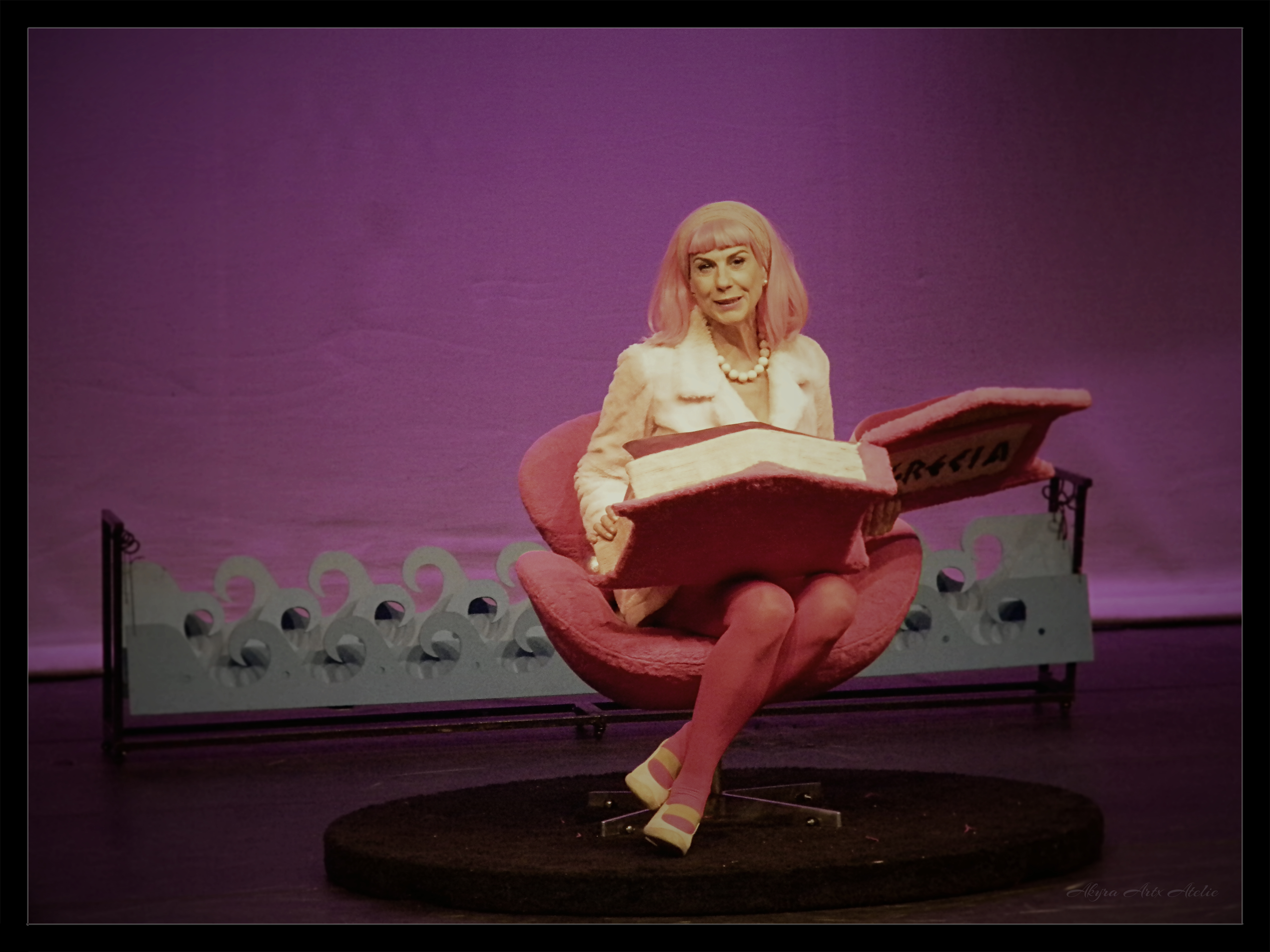
Ângela Dip portrays Rosana.

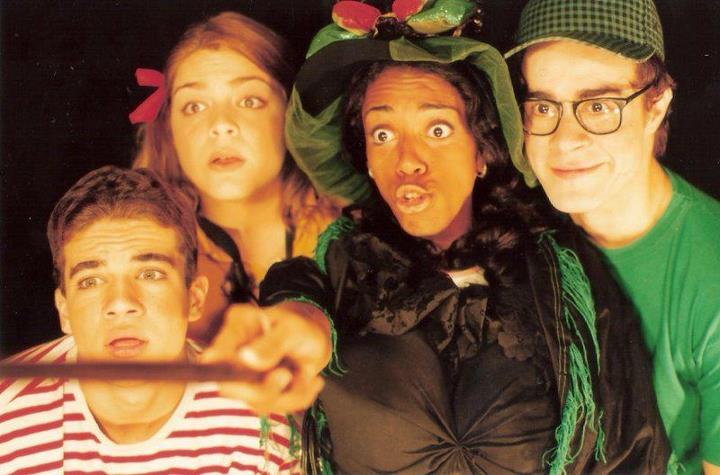
Thiago Mendonça portrays Vitor.

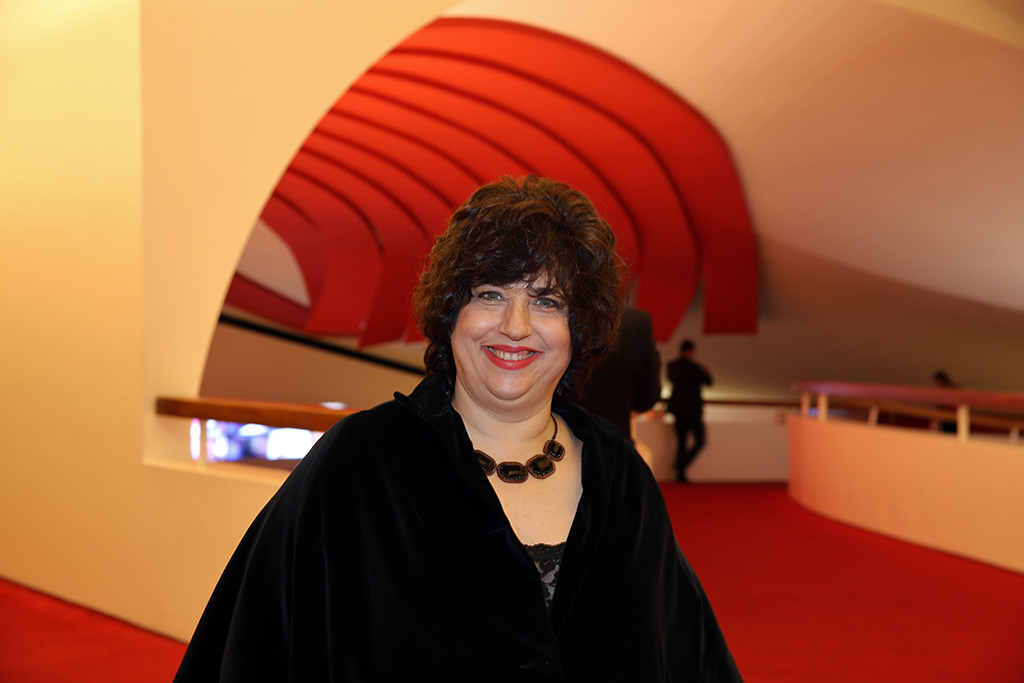
Cristina Mutarelli portrays Solange.

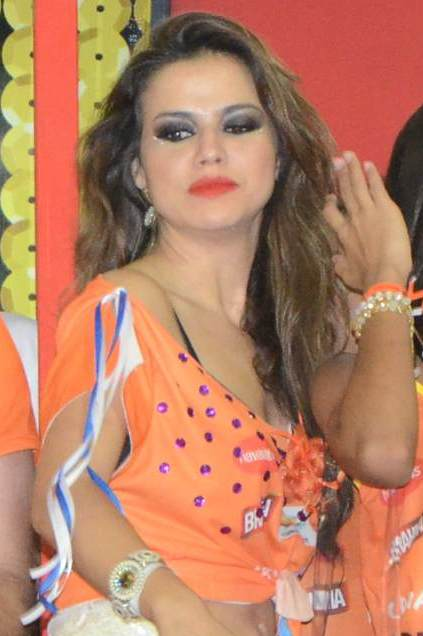
Laryssa Dias portrays Irmã Luzia.

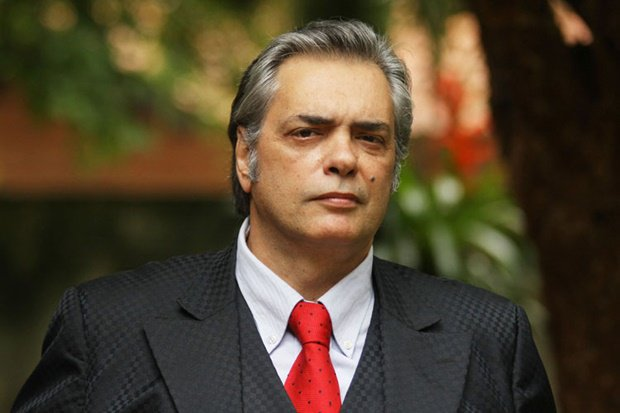
José Rubens Chachá portrays Delegado Peixoto.

== See also ==
- Carita de ángel - telenovela produced by Televisa in 2000
