= Eliana (television host) =

Brazilian TV host

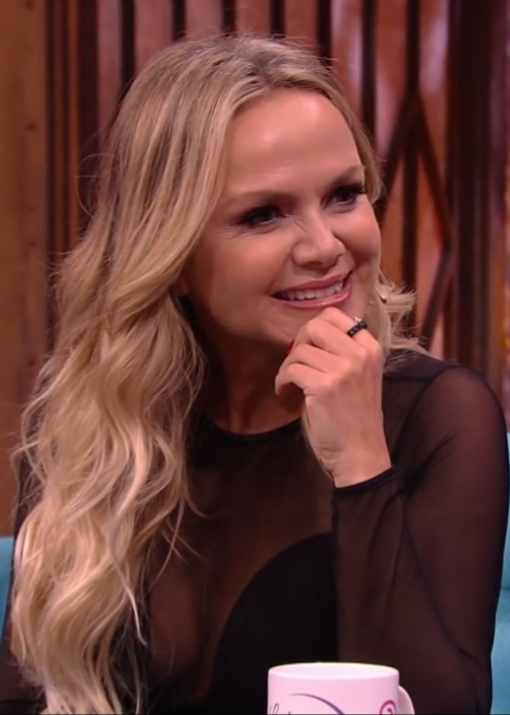
- Eliana in 2018
- Born: Eliana Michaelichen Bezerra; November 22, 1972 (age 53); São Paulo, Brazil
- Occupations: TV host, businesswoman
- Years active: 1991–present
- Spouses: Edu Guedes (m. 2004; div. 2007) João Marcelo Bôscoli (m. 2008; div. 2014)
- Children: 2
- Musical career
- Genres: Pop; children's music
- Instrument: Vocals
- Years active: 1993–2004
- Labels: Bertelsmann Music Group; RCA Records; Sony BMG Music Entertainment

Eliana Michaelichen Bezerra (born November 22, 1972), known mononymously as Eliana, is a Brazilian TV host, businesswoman, and former singer. From 2009 to 2024, she has been the host of the TV show Eliana, which broadcasts on the Brazilian TV network SBT on Sunday afternoons. Eliana is currently in TV Globo.

== Early life ==
Eliana was born on November 22, 1972, to José Bezerra and Eva Michaelichin. José Bezerra is a Ceará native born in the city of Solonópole and Eva Michaelichin is a Brazilian descendant of Ukrainians born in Irati.

Bezerra met Michaelichin at a family home in São Paulo where they both worked. The two married and had a daughter, Helena Duarte. At this time, Bezerra worked as caretaker of a residential building in the São Paulo Garden in São Paulo, a job he still holds today; Michaelichin was a maid and keeper of the building. Ten-year-old Helena wanted a sister and her parents took care of that order. Helena was and is a fundamental part of Eliana's life and could even be called her guardian angel.

Eliana has stated that she had a healthy childhood and that although she may not have had all the toys she wanted, she had the most important things: love, respect, and education. Her parents believed that education was of primary importance. Eliana knew she wanted to be an artist from a young age. As a student of the Vila-Lobos School in Ibirapuera, she participated in school parties. She danced her first carnaval at age nine. As early as age nine, Eliana said that she would be a great artist.

At age nine, Eliana was insistent on becoming a model and her mother registered her with a modeling agency called Joyce Manequim. Her first television appearance was in the advertising campaign Meu primeiro sutiã where Eliana only appeared as an extra. In 1986, at the age of 13, Eliana auditioned and was chosen to be part of the musical group A Patotinha. She was in the group for four years, that had much success with the song Baile dos Passarinhos.

When she was seventeen, Eliana was invited by Gugu to join the successful musical group Banana Split.

== Television career ==
Banana Split appeared on the TV show Qual é a Música? and Eliana made such an impression on host Silvio Santos that he invited her to take a screen test. She accepted and, in 1991, eighteen-year-old Eliana hosted her first program, Festolândia. She was studying psychology at Centro Universitário das Faculdades Metropolitanas Unidas (FMU) at the same time. Two months after the show's debut, Festolândia went off the air because of low viewership. Eliana begged Santos for another chance; he obliged and allowed her to present sketches on the TV show Sessão Padrão. During the show Eliana became known as Eliana dos dedinhos because of her popular song Os Dedinhos. Eliana was now a third-year psychology student at FMU.

Rather than continue her studies, Eliana chose an artistic career. At the age of 20, she hosted her third program Bom Dia & Cia. This children's program included sketches, the doll Melocoton, and the robot Flitz. The show was a success and spawned several albums and licensed products. Eliana became a millionaire. When Angélica left the Sistema Brasileiro de Televisão (SBT) in 1996, 23-year-old Eliana began to host TV Animal—a kids show about animals and fauna.

After successfully hosting TV Animal, Eliana wanted to present a program for the entire Brazilian family but was not able to reach an agreement with Santos. She decided to sign a contract with Rede Record, where she would be able to pursue new interests and host a Sunday program. Eliana was strongly criticized for her decision to leave the second largest broadcasting company in the nation to work for the third largest.

Eliana launched her new program, Eliana & Alegria, on October 12, 1998. On this show she presented cartoons, acted in sketches, had musical guests, and had educational segments. She and her team made Eliana & Alegria a great success (the program was number one with audiences). The show reached its peak thanks to the popularity of Pokémon that was aired inside the show. In 1999 Eliana launched another program, Eliana no Parque, which was broadcast on Sundays. It featured competitions between middle schools. In 2000 the program went off the air and Eliana was promised a new program. One year later she started a weekday preteen-oriented show in the afternoon which targeted mostly to girls. The show had musical guests, comedy sketches, and shows like Sabrina, the Teenage Witch and Clueless. The show was well received.

In 2005 she decided to leave children's shows and host a show for the whole family—the variety show Tudo é Possível. Everything is Possible had segments based on reality shows like Wife Swap and was a hit on Sunday afternoons at Record.

On August 30, 2009, she began hosting Eliana back at SBT.

In April 2024, Eliana announced her departure from SBT and in June she signed a contract with TV Globo to host The Masked Singer Brasil.

== Other ventures ==
Together with her former boyfriend and business partner, Marcos Quintela, she founded EMB Produções, an entertainment company that not only takes care of its products but those of other artists. EMB produces advertising campaigns and negotiates its program merchandise. Eliana has licensed more than 150 products. Eliana also has a band, Happy, that is presented all over Brazil during carnival.

== Personal life ==
Eliana and ex-husband João Marcello Bôscoli have one child, Arthur Michaelichen Bezerra Boscoli, born on August 10, 2011 She and Adriano Ricco have one child, Manuela Michaelichen Ricco, born on September 10, 2017.

== Discography ==
=== Albums ===
Title	Year	Sales	Certifications
Os Dedinhos	1993	300,000	Platinum Record
Eliana	1994	250,000	Platinum Record
Eliana	1995	1,500,000	Disco of Diamond
Eliana	1996	350,000	Platinum Record
Eliana	1997	350,000	Platinum Record
Eliana	1998	250,000	Platinum Record
Primavera	1999	250,000	Platinum Record
Eliana	2000	200,000	Gold Record
Eliana	2001	350,000	Platinum Record
Eliana é Dez	2002	600,000	2× Platinum Record
Festa	2003	300,000	Platinum Record
Diga Sim!	2004	100,000	Gold Record
Eliana 15 Anos	2006	150,000	Gold Record

=== Singles ===
- "Os Dedinhos" (1993).
- "Pop Pop" (1994).
- "Olha Passarinho" (1995).
- "A Dança do Bichos" (1996).
- "Xô Preguiça" (1997).
- "Amigo Cão" (1998).
- "Primavera" (1999).
- "A Força do Mestre" (2000).
- "A Galinha Magricela" (2001).
- "Um Mundo Ideal" (with Alexandre Pires) (2001).
- "Pula Corda" (2002).
- "Meu Cachorrinho" (Chihuahua) (2003).
- "Pop Pop" (pop remix) (2003).
- "Um, Dois, Três" (2004).
- "Diga Sim!" (2004).

== Filmography ==
=== Film ===
Eliana em O Segredo dos Golfinhos was released on January 14, 2005. Eliana produced the movie and starred in it as herself. It drew about 325,000 viewers which was much less than expected. The ecologically themed film, a recurring one in her television work, was directed by Eliana Fonseca. The cast included Fúlvio Stefanini, Daniel Del Sarto, Ângela Dip, Fernanda Souza, Jackson Antunes, Karin Rodrigues, Elias Andreato, Supla, Rouge, and Netinho. The movie was filmed in Mexico.

Year	Title	Paper	Ref
2005	Eliana em O Segredo dos Golfinhos	Eliana	

=== TV shows ===
Year	Title	Role	Network
1991–1992	Festolândia	Presenter	SBT
1992–1993	Sessão Desenho	Presenter	SBT
1993–1997	Bom Dia & Companhia	Presenter	SBT
1996	TV Animal	Presenter	SBT
1997–1998	Eliana & Cia	Presenter	SBT
1998–2003	Eliana & Alegria	Presenter	Rede Record
1999–2000	Eliana no Parque	Presenter	Rede Record
2003–2004	Eliana na Fábrica Maluca	Presenter	Rede Record
2004	Programa Eliana	Presenter	Rede Record
2005–2009	Tudo É Possível	Presenter	Rede Record
2007–2008	Mestres do Ilusionismo	Presenter	Rede Record
2009–2024	Eliana	Presenter	SBT
2009–2024	Teleton Brazil	Presenter	SBT
2011–2014	SBT Folia	Presenter	SBT
2013	Chiquititas	Herself (Episode: "November 4, 2013")	SBT
2024-actual	The Masked Singer Brasil	Presenter	TV Globo
2024-actual	Vem Que Tem	Presenter	TV Globo

== Awards ==
In 1999 Eliana was nominated for the Latin Grammy for best children's album for Primavera. Even though she didn't win, it was the first time a Brazilian was nominated for this category.

Year	Award	Category	Title	Result
2000	Latin Grammy	Best Latin Children's Album	Primavera	Won
2000	Troféu Imprensa	Best TV Presenter	Eliana	Nominated
2001	Troféu Imprensa	Best Children Program	Eliana & Alegria	Won
2008	Troféu Imprensa	Best Presenter	Eliana	Nominated
2009	Troféu Imprensa	Best Presenter	Eliana	Nominated
2010	Troféu Imprensa	Best Presenter	Eliana	Nominated
2010	Troféu Internet	Best Presenter	Eliana	Nominated
2011	Troféu Imprensa	Best Presenter	Eliana	Nominated
2011	Troféu Internet	Best Presenter	Eliana	Won
2012	Troféu Imprensa	Best Presenter	Eliana	Nominated
2012	Troféu Internet	Best Presenter	Eliana	Nominated
