= Cássia Linhares =

Brazilian television actress (born 1973)

- Born: Cássia Maria Oliveira Linhares; November 24, 1973 (age 52); Niterói, Rio de Janeiro, Brazil
- Occupation: Actress
- Spouse: Renato Bussière (2006-present)
- Children: 2

Cássia Maria Oliveira Linhares (born November 24, 1973, in Niterói) is a Brazilian television actress, best known for her role as Alice in Malhação (1998) and Lulu in Uga-Uga (2000).

In 2011, she acted in Rebelde as Sílvia Campos Sales.

She is married to businessman Renato Bussière, and both are parents of Eduarda and Antonio.

== Career ==
=== Television ===
Year	Title	Role	Notes
1994	Pátria Minha	Luciana	
1995	Explode Coração	Natasha	
1996	Xica da Silva	Nun	Cameo
1998	Malhação	Alice	
1998	Mulher	Vera	Episode: "Alucinações"
1998	Você Decide		Episode: "Garoto de Programa"
1999	Louca Paixão	Carla de Holanda	
2000	Você Decide		Episode: "Mamãezinha Querida"
2000	Uga-Uga	Lulú	
2001	Roda da Vida	Tamíres Almeida Alencar	
2001	O Clone	Laura	Cameo
2002	Sabor da Paixão	Marina Castro	
2003	Chocolate com Pimenta	Nádia	Cameo
2004	Casseta & Planeta, Urgente!	Herself	Cameo
2004	Começar de Novo	Maria Rocha	
2005	Sob Nova Direção	Paulona	Episode: "Mulher Solteira não Procura"
2005	Malhação	Maria das Graças (Gracinha)	Cameo
2006	Floribella	Kriseida	Cameo
2006	Alta Estação	Ana Lúcia Castro	
2007	Amor e Intrigas	Sílvia Dias Motta	
2010	A História de Ester	Lia	Cameo
2011	Rebelde	Sílvia Campos Sales Maldonado	
2014	Milagres de Jesus	Judi	Episode: O Cego de Jericó
2017	O Rico e Lázaro	Shag-Shag	
2019	Topíssima	Beatriz Nogueira de Mendonça	
2021	Gênesis	Naamá	

=== Films ===
Year	Title	Role
1998	Como Ser Solteiro	Júlia
2000	Bossa Nova	Reporter
