= Miravista =

Production label of Disney and Telefónica

- Founded: January 23, 2002; 24 years ago
- Founder: Diego Lerner (The Walt Disney Company Latin America); Ele Juárez (Admira); Mark Zoradi (Buena Vista International)
- Defunct: February 28, 2019; 7 years ago
- Fate: Dissolved
- Headquarters: Walt Disney Studios Lot, Burbank, California
- Owner: Telefónica S.A. (2002–2003); The Walt Disney Company (2002–2019)
- Parent: Telefónica (2002–2003); Walt Disney Studios Motion Pictures (Buena Vista International) (2002–2019)

Miravista was the production label of The Walt Disney Company, initially a partnership with Telefónica's Admira (until the dissolution of Admira in 2003 which led Disney fully own Miravista) founded by Diego Lerner, Ele Juárez and Mark Zoradi on January 23, 2002.

Walt Disney Studios Motion Pictures distributed some of Latin American and Brazilian films produced by Miravista through Buena Vista International until its dissolution in 2019, before the acquisition of 21st Century Fox in 2019.

== History ==
On January 23, 2002, Disney teamed up with Telefónica España's Admira to form Miravista, a production label to produce Latin American and Brazilian films.

Miravista's first film was Ladies' Night released on December 10, 2003.

On February 28, 2019, Miravista was dissolved following the release of Cinderela Pop and the prior the pending acquisition of 21st Century Fox.

== Filmography ==
| Release date | Title | Notes |
|---|---|---|
| September 12, 2003 | The Middle of the World | co-production Luiz Carlos Barreto Produções Cinematográficas, Filmes do Equador, Globo Filmes, MegaColor, Riofilme, Quanta Centro de Produções Cinematográficas, Lereby Productions and Sundance Institute Brazil Screenwriters Lab; first film |
| December 10, 2003 | Ladies' Night | co-production with Videocine |
| March 18, 2005 | Romeo and Juliet Get Married | co-production with Globo Filmes |
| November 2, 2006 | The Year My Parents Went on Vacation | co-production with Gullane Filmes, Caos Produções, Globo Filmes, Lereby, Teleimage and Locall |
| December 20, 2006 | Tired of Kissing Frogs | co-production with Bazooka Films and Santo Domingo Films |
| February 16, 2007 | Monica's Gang in an Adventure in Time | co-production with Mauricio de Sousa Produções, Diler & Associados, Labocine Digital |
| April 6, 2007 | Caixa Dois | co-production with Globo Filmes, LC Barreto & Filmes do Equador and Movi&Art |
| September 30, 2009 | The Assailant | co-production with Globo Filmes, Mixer Films, RT2A Produções Cinematográficas and Teleimage |
| July 23, 2010 | O Bem Amado | co-production with Natasha Films and Globo Filmes |
| June 10, 2011 | Qualquer Gato Vira-Lata | co-production with Tietê Produções, Globo Filmes and Filmland International |
| August 30, 2013 | Se Puder... Dirija! | co-production with Total Entertainment |
| March 20, 2014 | S.O.S. Mulheres ao Mar | co-production with Globo Filmes and Ananã |
| February 28, 2019 | Cinderela Pop | co-production with Panorâmica; distributed by Galeria Distribuidora; final film |
