= Laryssa Dias =

Brazilian actress and dancer

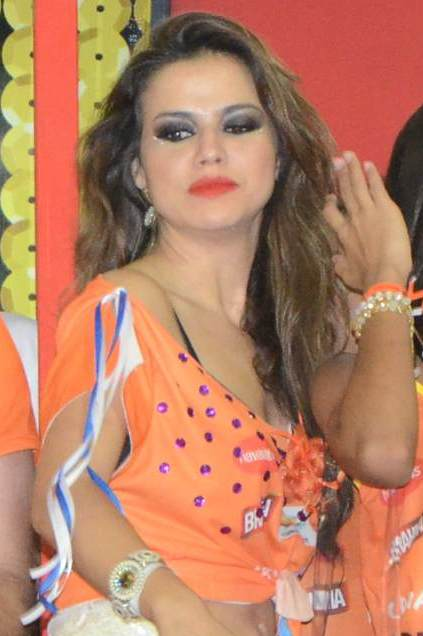
- Laryssa Dias in 2013
- Born: São Paulo, Brazil
- Occupation(s): Actress, model, dancer
- Years active: 2012–present

Laryssa Dias is a Brazilian actress, model and dancer. She started to become interested in artistic career at age five, when she began to study dance in the condominium where he lived. Passionate about film entered the theater at age 12. In 2008, made a cameo on the show 9mm: São Paulo FOX. In 2012, she joined the cast of the soap opera on Globo Salve Jorge playing the prostitute Waleska.

== Biography ==
Laryssa Dias came to prominence on television in interpreting the trafficked Waleska in "Salve Jorge" novel written by Gloria Perez and aired from October 2012. At 13, she joined the Laryssa House Theatre, where space had lessons with actress Ligia Cortez and took lessons in dance and circus. Began College Advertising and Marketing, at the University Mackenzie in São Paulo, and in parallel, joined the School of Actors Wolf Maya, where she stayed for three years and graduated. The actress's first job in television was in the police series "9mm SP", the pay channel Fox, in the seasons of 2010 and 2011. In 2012, she also starred in the short film "I Buy Cigarettes," director Marcel Mallio.

== Filmography ==
Television
Year	Title	Role	Notes
2009	9mm: São Paulo	Núbia	
2010	Tal Filho, Tal Pai	Cristiana "Cris" Souza Santos	End of year special
2012	Salve Jorge	Waleska	
2015	Verdades Secretas	Viviane Gomes	
2016-2018	Carinha de Anjo	Sister Luzia	
2023	Reis	Afra	Phase: "The consequence"

=== Film ===
Year	Title	Role
2012	Fui Comprar Cigarros	(Unavailable)

== Stage ==
Play	Director
Oeste Verdadeiro	Olair Coan
Casa de Bonecas	Sérgio Ferraria
