= Boas Novas =

Brazilian Christian television network

- Country: Brazil
- Broadcast area: Brazil
- Headquarters: Manaus, Amazonas

Programming
- Picture format: 1080i HDTV

Ownership
- Owner: Fundação Boas Novas

History
- Launched: 15 March 1993

Links
- Website: boasnovas.tv

Boas Novas is a Brazilian Christian television network owned by pastor Samuel Câmara. Created in 1993 from the takeover of RBN in Manaus from Grupo Simões, it is headquartered in Manaus.

== History ==
In January 1993, the Evangelical Church Assembly of God in Amazonas (IEADAM), led by pastor Samuel Câmara, appeared as a buyer, after the church's pastorate decided to acquire a radio station as a way of expanding its evangelization purposes to a number greater number of people. IEADAM and Grupo Simões negotiated the sale of Rádio Ajuricaba, but attracted by the opportunity to also have a television station, the pastors decided to acquire all the assets, reaching an agreement on January 7. IEADAM was supposed to pay 3.25 million dollars (the equivalent at the time of Cr$45 billion), divided into installments. On January 15, when signing the sales contract, the church made a down payment of 100,000 dollars, and must also pay another installment in the amount of 450,000 in the next 60 days to take definitive control of the vehicles – otherwise, the sale would be canceled, and all the money that had already been paid would be lost – and 24 more installments in subsequent months to complete the transaction. At the time, IEADAM's revenue was less than 300,000 dollars per month, and to complete the necessary amount, the church mobilized hundreds of faithful and members. Several of them pawned assets such as real estate, cars, jewelry and some started selling snacks and clothes on the streets of Manaus.

The church managed to raise the necessary money, and on March 15, 1993, RBN came under the control of the new owners, who paid off the remainder of the purchase in March 1995. The meaning of its acronym was changed, from Rede Brasil Norte to Rede Boas Novas, basically maintaining the same visual identity as the previous administration. Behind the scenes, professionals linked to the old management were fired, with the sole exception of technicians, and were replaced by people linked to the church. The secular programming of RBN and Manchete also underwent significant changes. Times traditionally occupied by film slots such as the Cinema Nacional and Sala VIP now featured local programs aimed at the evangelical community, such as Proclamai, Alfa e Ômega and Nos Bastidores da Igreja.

In 1995, it acquired TV Guajará in Belém, which also attracted Edir Macedo's attention (his plan was to turn it into a Record O&O). Since the Manaus station still had commercial agreements with minor television networks as a secondary affiliate, the network created Jesus Sat in 1995 to deliver a full feed of Christian programming via satellite. This arrangement lasted until 1999, when Boas Novas Manaus and Belém ceased relaying Central Nacional de Televisão, with which they held an affiliation agreement.

In April 2010, the mayor of Coari, Arnaldo Mitouso (which had defeated the powerful political group connected to the Assembly of God, through voting in the municipality in 2008), accused the same church and a local pastor (who gave a room in an annex at the building of the TV relay station, in order for Rádio Nova Coari FM to work after the station suffered from a fire, for criticizing the local administration. The mayo criticized the cession of the facilities for the radio station and threatened to take drastic measures against the location and the church's pastor, in case they did not change the location for the radio station's facilities to operate.

In January 2014, the network resumed airing programs from Valdemiro Santiago's World Church of God's Power.

Rede Boas Novas briefly aired programs from Igreja Apostólica Plenitude do Trono de Deus and also aired those from Rede Portas Abertas. Since November 1, 2016, it started sharing content from Rede Gênesis, owned by Comunidade Evangélica Sara Nossa Terra, enabling an arrangement in which each aired 12 hours of programming on the same frequency. With the partnership, both network claimed 80% coverage. The partnership ended on June 4, 2018.
