= Bom Dia & Cia =

- Also known as: Eliana & Cia; Bom Dia & Companhia; Bom Dia & Cia com Patati Patatá
- Genre: Children's program
- Created by: Nilton Travesso
- Directed by: Silvia Abravanel (2009–2022; 2025–present)
- Starring: Manuela do Monte; Giovanna Grigio
- Composers: María Cristina De Giacomi; Carlos Nilson; Caion Gadia
- Country of origin: Brazil
- Original language: Portuguese
- No. of seasons: 28
- No. of episodes: 7480

Production
- Producer: Fernando Pelegio
- Production locations: São Paulo, Brazil
- Camera setup: Multiple-camera setup
- Running time: 60 minutes (in 2022)

Original release
- Network: SBT
- Release: 2 August 1993 – 1 April 2022
- Release: 26 May – 12 December 2025

Bom Dia & Cia, also known as Eliana & Cia (1997–1998), Bom Dia & Companhia (2009–2017) and Bom Dia & Cia com Patati Patatá (2025), is a morning children's television show that airs on SBT from 2 August 1993 to 1 April 2022, and from 26 May to 12 December 2025. It is the longest-running Brazilian children's television program.

Bom Dia & Cia followed several formats over the years, with different hosts and cartoons. Early shows featured Eliana, who was at the beginning of her career as a children's presenter, following in the footsteps of other female hosts like Xuxa and Angélica. The program became known for its simple and educational format, where Eliana sometimes received guests on the show, and also interacted with puppet characters. The program was an audience favourite during the 1990s. This helped to raise Eliana's profile, making her popular with children, and with spin-off products that sold almost as well as those of Xuxa and Gugu Liberato.

After Eliana left SBT to work at RecordTV in 1998, the show was hosted by Jackeline Petkovic; better known as Jacky. The show followed the same style with guests, educational activities and puppets. Jacky also had a child stagehand, Michelle Giudice. After 2003, more youth hosts were used, including Yudi Tamashiro, Priscilla Alcântara and Maisa Silva. The show adopted a new format, with viewers able to phone in and win prizes including computers, video games and toys. The show changed format again in 2015 following a court injunction which banned the use of children as TV show hosts. The director Silvia Abravanel was the show's host until its final year.

Bom Dia & Cia aired clips from various animation departments over the years, including Disney, Warner Bros., Nickelodeon, DIC Entertainment and Mattel, as well as some anime.

On 26 May 2025, Bom Dia & Cia is rebranded as Bom Dia & Cia com Patati Patatá, with the music duo Patati Patatá.

== Puppet characters ==
The show used many puppet characters, who interacted with the presenters, until 2003.

- Fritz - A talking computer with arms and legs. He was Eliana's first supporting puppet, and continued until Jacky's first week. He researched the program's subjects and helped Eliana with other sketches, and was voiced by Edílson Oliveira da Silva.
- Melocoton - A purple chubby monster. At first, it debuted as a simple puppet with only a head visible, but it was later converted into a full-bodied puppet. The character was a funny, good-natured monster with a large appetite. Due to Eliana's success on the show, Melocoton was a popular spin-off product. The character was originally played by both Edílson Oliveira da Silva (providing the voice) and Hélio Eduardo Afonso (wearing the costume). Both actors later became known as the characters Chiquinho and Pitoco on Eliana & Alegria. When Eliana moved to Record to host Eliana & Alegria, a similar character was created called Nhoc.
- Gugui - A little blue alien with powers. Gugui was introduced in 2000 and remained Jacky's main supporting character until early 2003. After Guguie left the show, Jacky suggested that the character had returned to his home planet. His design is reminiscent of Gizmo from Gremlins.
- Piu and Pia - A couple of birds occasionally interacted with Jacky and Gugui. Piu is the male and is blue, while Pia is the female and is yellow. Like Gugui, they were used from 2000 to 2003.
- Ramon - A talking goldfish that lives inside an aquarium and occasionally interacted with Jacky. Like Gugui, it was used from 2000 to 2003.
