= Solonópole =

Municipality in Ceará, Brazil

Coordinates: 5°44′S 39°01′W

- Municipality
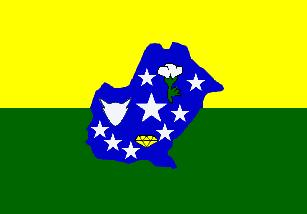
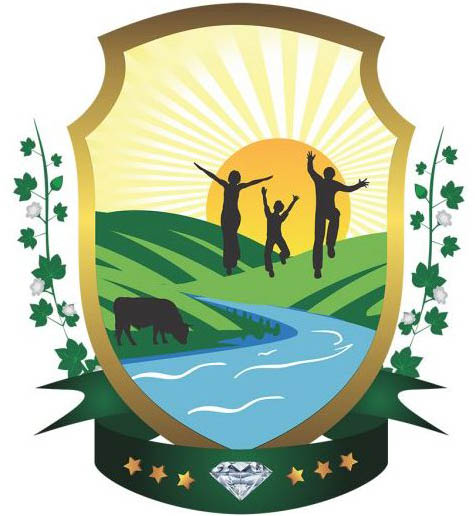
- Flag Coat of arms
- Interactive map of Solonópole
- Country: Brazil
- Region: Nordeste
- State: Ceará
- Mesoregion: Sertoes Cearenses

Area
  - Total: 593.114 sq mi (1,536.158 km^{2})

Population (2020)
  - Total: 18,357
- Time zone: UTC−3 (BRT)

Solonópole is a municipality in the state of Ceará in the Northeast region of Brazil.

== See also ==
- List of municipalities in Ceará
