= Gênesis =

- Genre: Telenovela
- Written by: Camilo Pellegrini; Raphaela Castro; Stephanie Ribeiro
- Directed by: Edgard Miranda; Leonardo Miranda; Carlos Magalhães; Carlo Milani
- Starring: Zé Carlos Machado; Adriana Garambone; Carlo Porto; Juliana Boller; Oscar Magrini; Cássia Linhares; Miguel Coelho; Michelle Batista; Pablo Morais; Francisca Queiroz; Juliano Laham; Letícia Almeida; Ângelo Paes Leme; Camila Rodrigues; Branca Messina; Igor Rickli
- Opening theme: "O Começo de Tudo" by Banda Universos
- Country of origin: Brazil
- Original language: Portuguese
- No. of seasons: 1
- No. of episodes: 220

Production
- Camera setup: Multi-camera
- Production companies: RecordTV; Casablanca

Original release
- Network: RecordTV
- Release: 19 January – 22 November 2021

Gênesis is a Brazilian telenovela produced by RecordTV and Casablanca that aired from 19 January 2021 to 22 November 2021. The series is written by Camilo Pellegrini, Raphaela Castro, and Stephanie Ribeiro. It stars an ensemble cast featuring Zé Carlos Machado, Adriana Garambone, Oscar Magrini, Cássia Linhares, Miguel Coelho, Thaís Melchior, Pablo Morais, Francisca Queiroz, Juliano Laham, Letícia Almeida, Juliana Boller and Carlo Porto. The plot is based on the Book of Genesis.

== Premise ==
Divided into seven phases, the series dates back to the beginning of humanity and the world, and tells the biblical stories of Garden of Eden, Noah's Ark, Tower of Babel, Ur of the Chaldees, Abraham, Jacob, and ending with Joseph of Egypt.

== Cast ==
=== Garden of Eden ===
- Carlo Porto as Adão
- Juliana Boller as Eva
- Igor Rickli as Lúcifer
- Caio Manhente as Abel
- Eduardo Speroni as Cain
- Flávio Galvão as Deus
- Ana Terra Blanco as Renah
- Carolina Oliveira as Kira
- Anna Rita Cerqueira as Tila
- Ranna Bittencourt as Aba
- Fernanda Junqueira as Naira
- Manu Papera as Mairi
- Joana Leite as Zohar
- Júlia Braz as Uma

=== Noah's Ark ===
- Oscar Magrini as Noé
  - Bruno Guedes as Young Noé
- Cássia Linhares as Naamá
  - Rafaela Sampaio as Young Naamá
- Igor Rickli as Lúcifer
- Augusto Caliman as Sem
- Marjorie Gerardi as Heidi
- Vinícius Redd as Cam
- Clara Niin as Tali
- Gil Coelho as Jafé
- Nicole Rosemberg as Dana
- Leonardo Medeiros as Zeno
- Clemente Viscaíno as Metusalém
- Jayme Periard as Lameque
- Alessandra Verney as Ada
- Carolina Chalita as Zilá
- Iran Malfitano as Tubalcaim
- Fernando Roncato as Jabal
- Sérgio Abreu as Jubal
- Flávio Galvão as Deus
- Stephanie Serrat as Laíza

=== Tower of Babel ===
- Pablo Morais as Ninrode
- Francisca Queiroz as Semíramis
- Pâmela Tomé as Liba
- Giuseppe Oristanio as Gomer
- Igor Rickli as Lúcifer
- Eline Porto as Harete
- Marcelo Galdino as Cuxe
- Adriana Rabelo as Ulia
- Daniel Dalcin as Asquenaz
- Caio Menck as Togarma
- Hugo Carvalho as Pelegue
- Gisela Reimann as Jália
- Duda Balestero as Cilá
- Vicky Valentim as Siméia
- Marcelo Gonçalves as Elisá
- Mariana Gallindo as Zade
- Flávio Galvão as Deus
- Ed Canedo as Sidom
- Saulo Rodrigues as Társis
- Mario Hermeto as Mizraim
- Dudu Azevedo as Jesus

== Production ==
Filming of the telenovela began in November 2019 in Cambará, Rio Grande do Sul. Production also took place in Ponta Grossa, Diamantina, Itaguaí, and in Ouarzazate, Morocco. On 16 March 2020, it was announced that filming of the telenovela was suspended due to the COVID-19 pandemic. RecordTV was forced to bring back cast members filming in Morocco to Brazil. Because of this, the premiere, which was scheduled for 14 April 2020, had to be postponed by RecordTV. Filming resumed on 19 October 2020 with strict safety protocols. During the suspension it was decided that the telenovela would no longer film in Morocco.

== Ratings ==
Season	Timeslot (BRT/AMT)	Episodes	First aired		Last aired		Avg. viewers (points)
Season	Timeslot (BRT/AMT)	Episodes	Date	Viewers (in points)	Date	Viewers (in points)	Avg. viewers (points)
1	Mon–Fri 9:00pm	220	19 January 2021	16	22 November 2021	14.2	12.5
