= Programa Raul Gil =

- Created by: Raul Gil
- Directed by: Raul Gil Jr.
- Presented by: Raul Gil
- Opening theme: Instrumental
- Ending theme: "Obrigado Senhor" by Raul Gil
- Country of origin: Brazil
- Original language: Portuguese

Production
- Running time: 270 minutes

Original release
- Network: TV Record (1973-1978; 1981-1988); Rede Tupi (1978-1980); SBT (1981-1984; 2010-2024); TV Rio (1988-1991); Rede Record (1991-1996; 1998-2005); Rede Manchete (1996-1998); Band (2005-2010)
- Release: October 18, 1973 – December 28, 2024

Programa Raul Gil was a musical and varieties TV show hosted by Raul Gil and broadcast on SBT from 1981 to 1984, was also previously broadcast on the channels Excelsior (1967-1970), Tupi (1978-1980), Record (1973-1978; 1980-1981; 1984-1996 and 1998-2005), Manchete (1996-1998) and Band (2005-2010). In 2010, Raul Gil returned to SBT with the same program on June 26, 2010, and the show remained on the air until December 28, 2024. The program ended its run on SBT on December 28, 2024.

== Winners ==
- Jotta A (2011)
