= Raul Gil =

Brazilian television presenter and singer

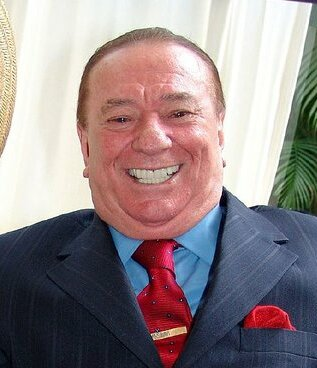
- Gil in 2005
- Born: January 27, 1938 (age 88); São Paulo, Brazil
- Occupation: Television presenter
- Spouse: Carmen Sanchez Gil (m. 1964)
- Relatives: Marquito (nephew)

Raul Gil (born January 27, 1938) is a Brazilian television presenter and singer. With a career spanning over 50 years, Gil currently presents his own weekly program on SBT channel.

In July 2017 he was criticized for making racist remarks and "slit-eye" gestures towards the K-pop band KARD.

== Filmography ==
Television
Year	Title	Notes
1957	Calouros Toddy	Participant
1967–72	Raul Gil Room	Host
1973–2024	Programa Raul Gil	Host
2006–08	Homenagem ao Artista	Host
2008–09	Todo Domingo é Natal	Host

Cinema
Year	Title	Role
1960	Tristeza do Jeca	Músico tocador de zabumba
2018	Incredibles 2	Esguicho (Brazilian voice)
