= Cinderela Pop =

2019 Brazilian romance film directed by Bruno Garotti

- Theatrical release poster
- Directed by: Bruno Garotti
- Screenplay by: Marcelo Saback; Bruno Garotti; Flávia Lins
- Based on: Cinderela Pop by Paula Pimenta
- Produced by: Rodrigo Montenegro; Mara Lobão; Rodrigo Guimarães
- Starring: Maisa; Fernanda Paes Leme; Filipe Bragança
- Cinematography: Dante Belluti
- Edited by: Diana Vasconcellos
- Production companies: Panorâmica; Miravista
- Distributed by: Galeria Distribuidora
- Release date: 28 February 2019 (Brazil)
- Running time: 95 minutes
- Country: Brazil
- Language: Portuguese

Cinderela Pop (released internationally as DJ Cinderella) is a 2019 Brazilian romantic comedy film directed by Bruno Garotti from a screenplay by Marcelo Saback, Garotti and Flávia Lins, based on the novel of the same name by Paula Pimenta.

== Plot ==
Cíntia Dorella is a 17-year-old girl who lives with her parents. She sees her world crumble when she discovers that her father Cesar has been cheating on her mother Ana with her evil stepmother Patricia by kissing her behind a closed curtain (which her daughter, Graziele, opened) during her parents' anniversary party, ultimately ending their marriage. Cesar eventually marries Patricia, causing Cintia to gain two new stepsisters.

Following her parents' divorce, Cintia moves in with her aunt Helena and her boyfriend Rafael, who taught Cintia lessons on DJing. Since Cintia wanted to be a professional DJ, she always begged Rafael to get her to play at parties. Rafael always lets her, so he can have more time to relax.

The first time Rafael let her DJ was at a senior pool party, and an elder woman asked her to turn the music down. Cintia refused, because if she turned down the music, then no one would be able to hear it. This annoyed the woman, which led her ask Cintia's name so she can complain to the party host. When Cintia gives her full name, the woman mishears it as "Cinderella".

Freddy Prince, a boy who became famous by writing love songs, is invited to perform at Cintia's stepsisters' birthday party. Cintia is invited by her father, but declines the invitation.

Rafael asks Cintia to DJ for him at this "party". When she arrives at the event, she learns that would actually perform at her stepsisters' party, and would have to do so until Freddy arrived. Freddy arrives at the party, and prepares himself to perform when he hears a remix that Cintia made with one of his songs. With a masquerade mask on, he goes to the DJ booth where Cintia is DJing. Even though Cintia is in a mask, he instantly falls in love with her. When Cintia is called up by Freddy to dance with him, Cintia does not go, afraid of the disapproval of her father. Since the party, Freddy keeps trying to discover Cintia's identity, but fails.

Cíntia ends up falling in love with Freddy after discovering each other's identities, but has to deal with Patricia, who does not want them together. Cintia's mother shows up, overpowering Patricia. In the end, Patricia's daughters were not even that bad. One of them even helped prove how evil Patricia is punishment. Freddy and Cintia end up together. Both of them work together to improve their music and become very successful in the music industry and forces cesar to take the position because of him as a punishment. Patricia returns to live with her mother, who lives in a very small house and forces Patricia to clean all day.

== Cast ==
- Maisa Silva as Cíntia Dorella
- Filipe Bragança as Freddy Prince
- Fernanda Paes Leme as Patrícia
- Letícia Faria Pedro as Graziele
- Kiria Malheiros as Gisele
- Elisa Pinheiro as Helena Dorella
- Giovanna Grigio as Belinha
- Miriam Freeland as Ana Dorella
- Marcelo Valle as César Dorella
- Bárbara Maia as Lara
- Sergio Malheiros as Rafael
- Leo Cidade as André
- Matheus Costa as Diego
- Isabel Fillardis as Lúcia

== Production ==
Filming took place in Rio de Janeiro in June and July 2018, and lasted five weeks.

== Critical reception ==
Julia Sabbaga, reviewing for Omelete, wrote a positive review saying that "Cinderella's great triumph" is a version meaning of "such an old plot," casting a spice of Cinderella in a romantic comedy without any outdated meaning in no time."

Sérgio Rizzo, writing for O Globo was the least complimentary in his comment: "The realism of the original plot, with a language that can easily be localized, gives way to a caricature custody of those who have 'new money'."
