= List of Graduados characters =

From left to right: Victoria "Vicky" Lauria (Paola Barrientos), Guillermo "Willy" Almada (Juan Gil Navarro), Jimena Benitéz/Patricia Longo (Isabel Macedo), Pablo "Bon Jovi" Catáneo (Luciano Cáceres), María Laura "Loli" Falsini (Nancy Dupláa), Andrés "Andy" Goddzer (Daniel Hendler), Benjamín "Tuca" Pardo (Mex Urtizberea), Azul Vega (Dolores Fonzi), Verónica "Vero" Diorio (Julieta Ortega)

Graduados (Spanish: The Graduates) is a 2012 Argentine TV series.

== The Goddzer ==
| Character | Actor | Also known as | Description |
|---|---|---|---|
| Andrés Goddzer | Daniel Hendler | Andy | Andrés is the main character. He is a dog walker, and a fan of 1980s Argentine rock music. Along with Tuca and Vero, he refuses to take a steady job and tries to keep the rebel ideas of his teenager years. |
| Gabriela Goddzer | Violeta Urtizberea | Gaby | Gabriela is Andrés' sister. Unlike him, she tries to have university studies and a job. |
| Elías Goddzer | Roberto Carnagui | | Elías is Andrés' father. He owns a shop of clothes. |
| Dana Blatt de Godzzer | Mirta Busnelli | | Dana is Andrés' mother. |
| Daniel Goddzer | Andy Kusnetzoff | Dany | Daniel is Andrés' Cousin, and has a similar lifestyle. |

== The Falsini/Catáneo ==
| Character | Actor | Also known as | Description |
|---|---|---|---|
| María Laura Falsini | Nancy Dupláa | Loli | Loli had sex with Andres during the graduation night, in 1989. 18 years later she realized that Andrés, and not Pablo, is the biological father of Martín. |
| Pablo Catáneo | Luciano Cáceres | Bon Jovi | The school bully, he got married with Loli after the graduation, when it was suspected that, as her official boyfriend, he left her pregnant. |
| Martín Catáneo | Gastón Soffritti | | The son of Loli, he discovered that his true father is Andy, and not Pablo. |
| Clemente Falsini | Juan Leyrado | | The owner of the Mc Can firm, and father of Loli |
| Patricia Longo | Isabel Macedo | Jimena Benitez, Pato | Once a fat girl bullied at school, she got thin and changed her name from Jimena Benitez to Patricia Longo |
| Augusto Giribone | Marco Antonio Caponi | | Augusto is Pablo's brother, confident an ally in his machinations |

== Others ==
| Character | Actor | Also known as | Description |
|---|---|---|---|
| Verónica Diorio | Julieta Ortega | Vero | Vero is a tomboy who stayed since high school with Andy and Tuca. She has an amateur radio that airs 1980s music. She had romances with Daniel, Augusto and Andi; and ended the telenovela alone. |
| Benjamín Pardo | Mex Urtizberea | Tuca | Tuca is the "life of the party" type of guy, who's always eager for parties and celebrations |
| Guillermo Almada | Juan Gil Navarro | Willy | Guillermo is a gay, who came out of the closet during a reunion of former students. This led to conflicts with Pablo, who used to be his best friend, and Vicky, who had a secret crush on him. |
| Victoria Lauría | Paola Barrientos | Vicky | Vicky is a psychologist, and Loli's best friend since high school. She had a son with Tuca. |
| Sofía Conte | Jenny Williams | | Sofía was Martín's best girlfriend |
| Luna | Natalie Peréz | | Luna is the daughter of Fernando, Guillermo's partner, and thus adoptive daughter of Guillermo. She's the second and final girlfriend of Martín. |

== Minor characters ==
| Character | Actor | Description |
|---|---|---|
| Walter Mao | Chang Kim Sung | Mao is Mr. Falsini's assistant |
| Clara Acuña | Mercedes Scápola | Clara is the housekeeper of the Catáneo family |
| Beatriz Ramírez | Chela Cardalda | Beatriz is Tuca's housekeeper |
| Fernando Pontevedra | Ivo Cutzarida | Fernando is Vicky's doctor, he had a gay romance with Guillermo. |
| Azul Vega | Dolores Fonzi | Another former student, with a hippie family |
| Juan Peralta | Lucas Velazco | A school bully that bullies Martín, and eventually become a friend |

== Playing themselves ==
- Gastón Gaudio
- Pablo Ruiz
- Sébastien Loeb
- Pimpinela
- Silvio Soldán
- César "Banana" Pueyrredón
- Rosario Ortega
- Cayetano
- Fabiana Cantilo
- Martín Palermo
- Guillermo Coppola
- Sandra Mihanovich
- Charly García
- Emanuel Ortega
- Brenda Bonotto
- Mario "Pájaro" Gómez
- Florencia de la V
- Fito Páez
- Pipo Cipolatti
- El Bahiano
- Los Pericos
- Viviana Canosa
- Bobby Flores
- Juanse
- Axel
- Palito Ortega
- Enanitos Verdes
- Claudio María Domínguez
