= Benjamín Pardo (fictional character) =

- Graduados character
- Benjamín "Tuca" Pardo, played by Mex Urtizberea
- Portrayed by: Mex Urtizberea
- Duration: 2012
- Crossover appearances: Los vecinos en guerra Educando a Nina
In-universe information
- Other names: Tuca
- Occupation: Socialite
- Civil partner: Victoria Lauría

Benjamín "Tuca" Pardo is a fictional character in the 2012 Argentine telenovela Graduados. He is played by Mex Urtizberea, both as an adult and, in flashbacks, as a teenager.

== Fictional biography ==
Benjamín "Tuca" Pardo was a high school student in the 1980s, and became best friends with Andrés Goddzer (Daniel Hendler) and Verónica Diorio (Julieta Ortega). He became a millonarie, and keeps hosting parties. He fell in love with Victoria Lauría (Paola Barrientos), and got married with her.

== Character creation ==
Initially, Violeta Urtizberea (the daughter of Mex Urtizberea) was part of the cast of Graduados, and Mex shared ideas about the program with Sebastián Ortega, his friend. When the actor that would have played the "Tuca" character left the cast, Ortega invited Mex to take part in it as well. Initially, Mex refused, so Ortega promised him that there would be no shared scenes between both. Violeta refused as well to work in the same program with her father, but finally accepted.

According to Urtizberea, Ortega described Tuca as the heir of a big fortune, who lives making parties with his friends. He would have an artificial beard and a scruffy style. Mex designed then his walking and talking manners, and draw inspiration for his slow pronunciation from the poet Eduardo Mileo.

== Other media ==
Mex Urtizberea appeared in an interview at the TV program La Pelu fully costumed as the character. He maintained the "Tuca Pardo" persona during the interview, and detailed his biography and his relation with Victoria Lauría (another character from the telenovela) in a complete in-universe perspective.

There was a cameo at the 2013 telenovela Los vecinos en guerra, also produced by Ortega. The character appeared in a party attended by Paloma (Candela Vetrano) and Lucas (Gastón Soffritti). The cameo took place because the scene was being filmed near Urtizberea's house; the TV channel Telefe had kept the costume and artificial beard that he had used. However, his cameo did not help to boost the ratings of the program, which stayed below the rival telenovela Solamente Vos.

== Awards ==
Mex Urtizberea has been nominated to the 2012 Tato Awards and the 2012 Martín Fierro Awards; but did not receive either one.
