= Underground Producciones =

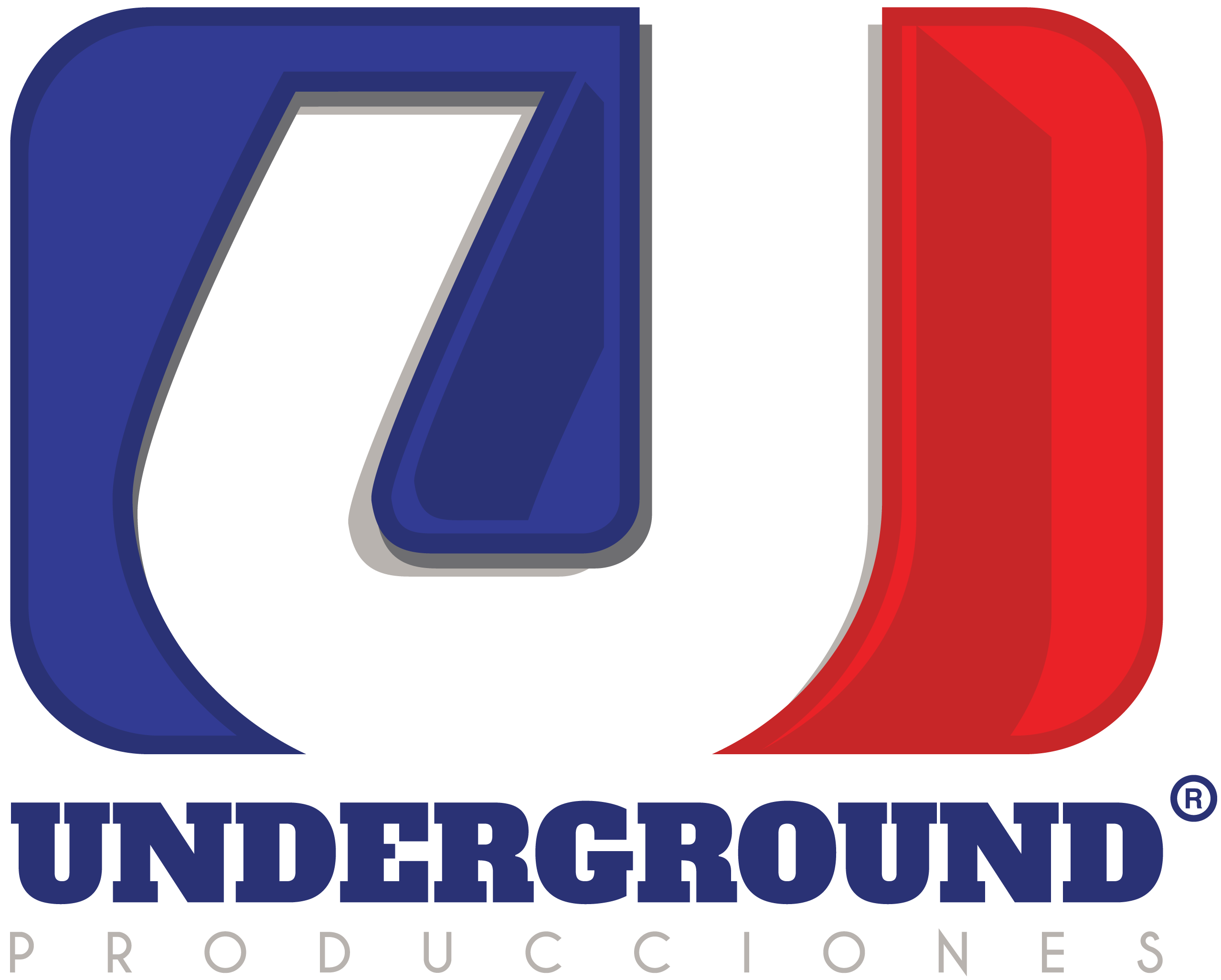

Underground Producciones is a media producer in Argentina that produces television and film. The company was created in 2006 by Sebastian Ortega and Pablo Culell.

In 2006, the company's first project was the dramatic telenovela Weather Does Not Stop, aired on Argentina channel 9. The show won several awards. That same year, Underground Producciones put our the Househusband sitcom and the sitcom Gladiators of Pompeii on the same channel.

In 2007, in partnership with Dori Media, Sebastian Ortega, Lalola notion for Latin TV. This sitcom also achieved important awards (including two awards for Best Fiction Martín Fierro and Best Actress Carla Peterson, besides the Golden Martín Fierro), globally successful, being sold to over 70 countries.

In 2008, in partnership with Telefe Contenidos and Endemol, creates and produces Los Exitosos Pells, sold to over 40 countries, including adaptations.

Later, in 2012 produced for Telefe, a successful sitcom called Graduados, a project created in 2004 and resumed that year.

On August 14, 2019, NBCUniversal (through their Telemundo division) acquired the company, becoming an extension of Telemundo global studios.

== TV productions ==
- Amo de casa (Canal 9, 2006), con: Carlos Calvo, Andrea Bonelli, Germán Kraus, Betiana Blum y Beatriz Bonnet.
- Gladiadores de Pompeya (Canal 9, 2006), con: Andrea Del Boca y Gabriel Goity.
- El tiempo no para (Canal 9, 2006), con: Valentina Bassi, Antonio Birabent, Belén Blanco, Julieta Cardinali, Luciano Castro, Rafael Ferro, Dolores Fonzi, Julieta Ortega, Walter Quiroz, Gonzalo Valenzuela and Nacha Guevara.
- Lalola (América TV, 2007-2008), con: Carla Peterson y Luciano Castro.
- Los exitosos Pells (Telefe, 2008-2009), con: Carla Peterson, Mike Amigorena, Hugo Arana, Diego Ramos, Walter Quiroz, Claudia Fontán and Andrea Bonelli.
- Botineras (Telefe, 2009-2010), con: Florencia Peña, Nicolás Cabré, Romina Gaetani and Damián De Santo.
- Un año para recordar (Telefe, 2011), con: Carla Peterson, Gastón Pauls, Rafael Ferro, Gonzalo Valenzuela y Eleonora Wexler.
- Graduados (Telefe, 2012), con: Nancy Duplaa, Luciano Cáceres, Daniel Hendler, Isabel Macedo, Julieta Ortega and Juan Gil Navarro.
- Los Vecinos en Guerra (Telefe, 2013), con: Diego Torres, Eleonora Wexler, Mike Amigorena, Marcela Kloosterboer and Mirta Busnelli.

== Unitary ==
- Lo que el tiempo nos dejó - (Telefe, 2010).
- Historia Clínica - (Telefe, 2012).
- El pueblo que no quería morir - (Telefe, 2012).

== Documentaries ==
- Travesía Chubut - (Discovery Travel & Living, 2011).
- Grandes Biografías - (Telefe, 2013).
