= Verónica Diorio =

- Graduados character
- Verónica Diorio, played by Julieta Ortega
- Portrayed by: Julieta Ortega
- Duration: 2012
In-universe information
- Other names: Vero Diorio
- Occupation: Radio host

Verónica Diorio is a fictional character in the 2012 Argentine telenovela Graduados. She is played by Julieta Ortega, both as an adult and, in flashbacks, as a teenager.

== Fictional biography ==
Verónica Diorio was a high school student in the 1980s, and became best friends with Andrés Goddzer (Daniel Hendler) and Tuca Pardo (Mex Urtizberea). She stayed as her best friend after graduation and runs an amateur radio station that plays 1980s Argentine rock music.

She had romances with Andrés Goddzer, his brother Daniel, and Augusto Giribone.

== Character creation ==
Verónica Lozano was initially meant to be the actress playing the character, but declined the offer. Julieta Ortega, who was initially part of the cast as Victoria Lauría, was reassigned to the character. Victoria Lauría was finally played by Paola Barrientos.

Julieta Ortega described her character as a girl that refuses responsibilities, stable relations or trying to build a family, preferring instead to stay with her friends. Ortega does not feel identified with those attitudes of her character.

As the character is a rocker, her wardrobe includes several T-shirts with logos of bands. In the episode aired on April 2, 2012, which is the Malvinas Day in Argentina, the anniversary of the start of the 1982 Falklands War against the United Kingdom, she used a T-shirt of the Sex Pistols with the Union Jack, which became controversial. Diorio clarified that the episodes are filmed several days in advance and that the production was not aware of the day in which each one is finally aired; the Sex Pistols T-shirt was then removed from the wardrobe of the character.

The character was renamed as "Verónica Sarmiento" in the Chilean remake, Graduados, historias que no se olvidan. She is played by the Chilean actress Elvira Cristi.
