= Graduados =

Argentine television series

- Logo and main characters of Graduados
- Genre: Television comedy
- Created by: Sebastián Ortega
- Developed by: Endemol; Underground producciones
- Written by: Ernesto Korovsky; Silvina Frejdkes; Alejandro Quesada
- Directed by: Miguel Colom; Pablo Ambrosini
- Starring: Nancy Dupláa; Daniel Hendler; Luciano Cáceres; Isabel Macedo; Full cast
- Theme music composer: Tan Biónica
- Opening theme: Los Graduados
- Composer: Cachorro López
- Country of origin: Argentina
- Original language: Spanish
- No. of seasons: 1
- No. of episodes: 178

Production
- Producer: Pablo Culell
- Running time: 55 minutes

Original release
- Network: Telefe
- Release: March 12 – December 19, 2012

Graduados (English: The Graduates) is a 2012 Argentine telenovela that was broadcast by Telefe from March 12 to December 19. The plot concerns a group of people who graduated from high school in 1989 and reunite twenty years later. The main character, Andrés Goddzer (Daniel Hendler), discovers that María Laura Falsini (Nancy Dupláa) was pregnant in 1989 and married Pablo Catáneo (Luciano Cáceres), who thought that he was the child's father. The resulting parental dispute, the love triangle of the main characters and 1980s nostalgia are frequent plot elements, and story arcs related to school bullying and LGBT rights are also featured. The frequent flashbacks of the characters to their high-school days use the same actors, playing teenagers.

The series, written by Sebastián Ortega, was produced by Endemol and Underground producciones. Although Andy Kusnetzoff was offered the lead-character role, Hendler was cast when Kusnetzoff turned it down (the latter joined the cast several months later as another character). The telenovela featured cameos and guest appearances by Argentine rock musicians and other celebrities. Graduados was widely successful, prevailing in the ratings over the blockbuster competitive dance program Showmatch and the telenovela Sos mi hombre. Although it received the 2012 Golden Martín Fierro award, seven other Martín Fierro Awards and ten Tato Awards (including Program of the Year), plans for theatrical and film adaptions were abandoned. The telenovela's proposed second season was renamed Viudas e hijos del Rock and Roll, with most of the cast and similar storylines. Local versions of the series have been made in Chile, Colombia, Greece and Serbia.

== Plot ==
A group of high-school students graduate in 1989. María Laura Falsini (Nancy Dupláa) is the girlfriend of Pablo Catáneo (Luciano Cáceres), the school bully. When María Laura sees Pablo having sex in the bathroom with another girl during the graduation party, she leaves the party. Andrés Goddzer (Daniel Hendler) accompanies her, and they have sex in his car. María Laura becomes pregnant and her father, Clemente Falsini (Juan Leyrado), owner of Mac Can, a successful dog-food company, orders her to marry Pablo—unaware of her encounter with Andrés.

The first episode then makes an ellipsis from 1989 to 2012. Pablo works for Clemente's company, and Andrés is a slacker without a stable job who works as dog walker. María Laura hires Andrés by chance, and remembers their 1989 encounter; a DNA test confirms that Andrés (not Pablo) is the father of her son, Martín. These events give the series its basic plot: Andrés tries to adjust to his newly discovered paternity, Pablo resents his intrusion, Martín tries to stay on good terms with both of them and María Laura begins a romance with Andrés. Pablo cheats on her with Patricia Longo (Isabel Macedo), Clemente's wife and secretary. She becomes pregnant by Pablo, but claims that Clemente is her son's father.

Andrés' family is Jewish. His parents are Elías (Roberto Carnaghi) and Dana (Mirta Busnelli), and his sister Gabriela (Violeta Urtizberea) works at MAC CAN, and has been unlucky in love. Andrés maintains his friendship with two high-school classmates: Benjamín "Tuca" Pardo (Mex Urtizberea) and Verónica Diorio (Julieta Ortega), who runs a radio station which plays 1980s Argentine rock music. María Laura keeps in touch with her best friend in high school: psychiatrist Victoria Lauría (Paola Barrientos), a single woman looking for a partner with whom to have a surrogate child. Guillermo Almada (Juan Gil Navarro), another classmate, takes a job at Mac Can and comes out during a meeting of the graduates. Clemente's wife Patricia is, unknown to everybody else, another classmate. Obese at school, she lost weight and changed her face and name.

Patricia's secret is slowly revealed to the other characters. Pablo learns her true identity in the series finale, and they stay together. Andrés and Maria Laura leave the city; Victoria has a son with Tuca; Elías and Dana open a knish shop and Gabriela marries her neighbor, Marito (Alan Sabbagh). The series ends with a party hosted by the school for the 1989 graduates, similar to the graduation party in the first episode.

== Cast ==
Actor	Character	Description
Daniel Hendler	Andrés Goddzer	The main character, Andrés is a dog walker and a fan of 1980s Argentine rock music. With Tuca and Vero, he refuses to take a steady job and tries to keep his teenage rebelliousness alive.
Nancy Dupláa	María Laura Falsini	Known as Loli, she has sex with Andrés on their graduation night in 1989. Eighteen years later, she realizes that Andrés (not her husband, Pablo) is Martín's father.
Luciano Cáceres	Pablo Catáneo	The school bully, he married his girlfriend Loli after graduation when he was apparently responsible for her pregnancy.
Isabel Macedo	Patricia Longo	An obese girl who was bullied at school, she lost weight and changed her name from Jimena Benitez to Patricia Longo.
Julieta Ortega	Verónica Diorio	Vero is a tomboy who has remained friends with Andy and Tuca since high school. She operates a pirate radio station, which plays 1980s music.
Mex Urtizberea	Benjamín "Tuca" Pardo	Tuca is a millionaire who hosts parties and does not take anything seriously.
Paola Barrientos	Victoria Lauría	A psychologist who has been María Laura's best friend since high school.
Gastón Soffritti	Martín Catáneo	The son of Loli, he discovered that his true father is Andy and not Pablo.
Violeta Urtizberea	Gabriela Goddzer	Andrés' sister tries to attend university and keep a job.
Juan Leyrado	Clemente Falsini	Owner of the McCan company and Loli's father
Mirta Busnelli	Dana Blatt de Goddzer	Andrés' mother
Roberto Carnaghi	Elías Goddzer	Andrés' father, who owns a clothing shop
Juan Gil Navarro	Guillermo Almada	A gay man, who comes out at a class reunion
Marco Antonio Caponi	Augusto Giribone	Pablo's brother, confidant and ally

== Production ==
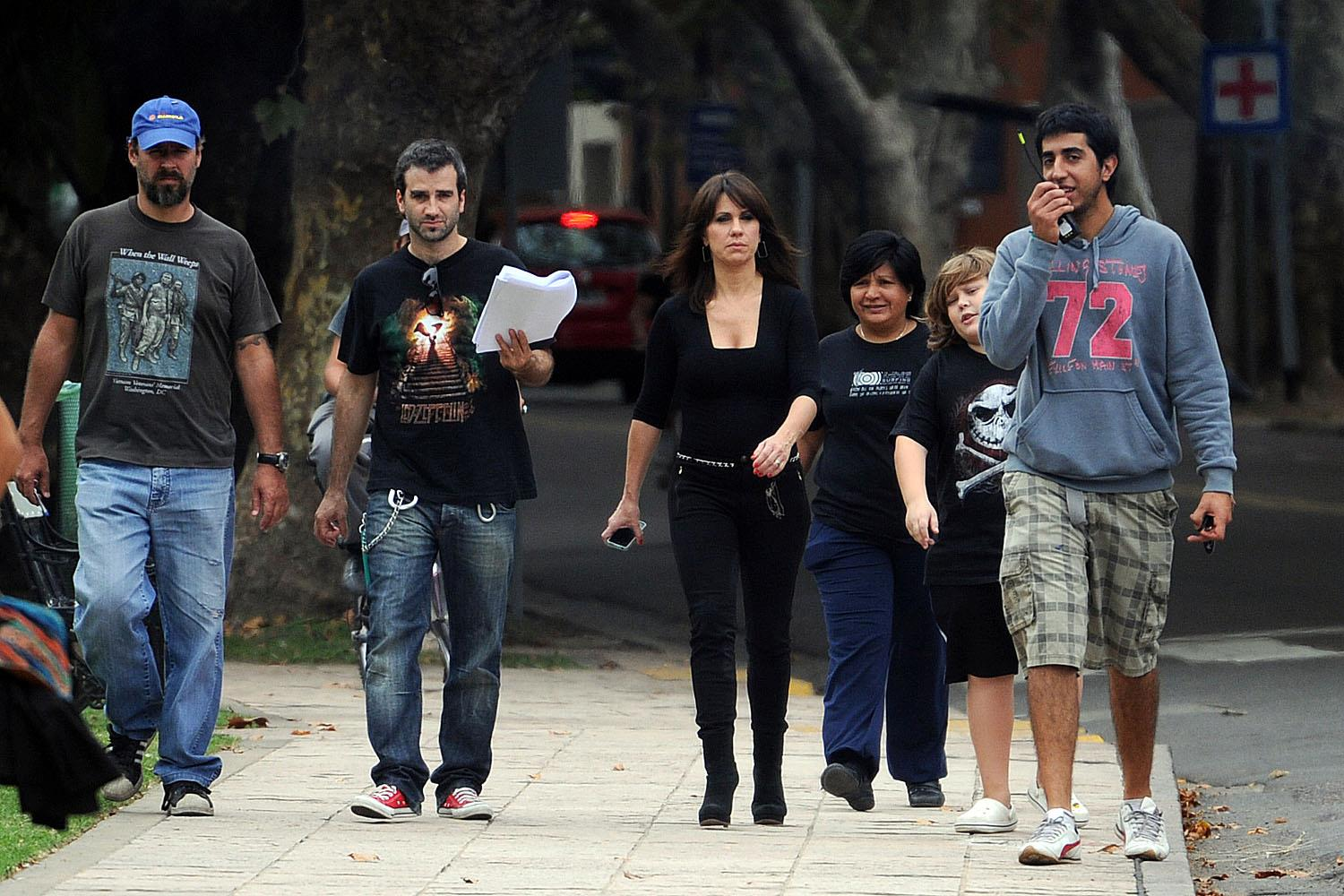
Nancy Dupláa, Daniel Hendler and part of the production crew

Graduados refers frequently to the 1980s (the decade in which the main characters attended high school), using 1980s Argentine slang and flashbacks to evoke nostalgia. The series uses 1980s music—in particular, Argentine rock—and several Argentine musicians made cameo appearances. Graduados was part of a trend in 2012 Argentine television toward nostalgia. According to Argentine consumer-trends consultant Ximena Díaz Alarcón, "The 80s are nowadays far enough to be idealized and close enough to laugh about the earlier versions of oneself". Psychologist and consumer-trends consultant Mariela Mociulsky also suggested that the show's structure invited viewers to compare their lives with the plans they made when they were younger.

Graduados had scripts written by Ernesto Korovsky, Silvina Frejdkes and Alejandro Quesada. Although it was primarily a comedy, it also had a dramatic approach to LGBT rights and school bullying. In Clarín, Adriana Schettini praised its transitions from dramatic to comic scenes, its acting and scripts and its faithfulness to the characters' profiles.

=== Creation and cast ===
Graduados was created by Sebastián Ortega with the working title of El paseaperros (Spanish: The Dog Walker), a planned miniseries about a character and his group of friends. The writers gradually expanded the storyline, incorporating more characters and story arcs. Although Andy Kusnetzoff turned down a starring role in the show because of his work at Radio Metro, he made cameo appearances in six episodes and later became a regular character. Mike Amigorena was offered the lead-protagonist and lead-antagonist roles, but declined both. Relative unknown Daniel Hendler was finally selected to play Andrés; he had already been cast as the secondary character Tuca, who was played by Mex Urtizberea after Hendler was recast as Andrés. The character of Verónica Diorio was initially written for actress Verónica Lozano, who turned down the role. Julieta Ortega, initially cast as Victoria Lauría, replaced Lozano and Victoria was played by stage actress Paola Barrientos. Érica Rivas and Ludovico Di Santo also turned down roles in the series and their characters were played by Nancy Dupláa and Marco Antonio Caponi, respectively.

Juan Leyrado played a grandfather for the first time in his career. Unlike the usual telenovela grandfather (a secondary character), his character has a prominent role and his own story arcs. Leyrado, who was 60 years old when the series was made, said that he was still active in his personal life and played the character according to his own experiences. Korean-Argentine Chang Kim Sung, who played Walter Mao, said he was proud that his character did not conform to stereotypes of Asian people.

Although Mex and Violeta Urtizberea are father and daughter, Violeta accepted a role in the series without knowing that her father was also part of the cast and asked him to respect her space. Although they played characters of similar ages, they rarely have joint scenes. Julieta Ortega said that she has nothing in common with her character in the series. Juan Gil Navarro, who appeared in the television drama La Dueña at the same time, said that although he does not normally appear in comedies he followed his wife's suggestion.

Isabel Macedo had played several villains, including in Floricienta, and took the Patricia Longo-Jimena Benitez role because it was something she had not done before. Although Patricia's past identity as Jimena was intended to be a secret for only ten episodes, Macedo insisted that the mystery should be maintained for a longer time. She read about victims of school bullying to inform her character and declined other work during the year to stay focused on the series, becoming emotionally attached to her character.

=== Recurring elements ===
==== Drama ====
The series includes a homosexual character, Guillermo Almada (Juan Gil Navarro), who came out in the early episodes and later married his partner in a ceremony featuring guest appearances by Evangelina Salazar and Luis Brandoni. This was the first fictional same-sex marriage on Argentine television since it was legalized in 2010, reflected the growing acceptance of sexual freedom in Argentina. Another character, Patricia Longo, was an obese girl who was a victim of school bullying. Isabel Macedo had to be heavily made up to appear obese for the flashbacks. Patricia was initially the telenovela's villain, with the bullying her motivation for inflicting revenge on her former classmates. The episode in which she reveals her true identity was well received.

==== Flashbacks ====
The cast as teenagers in a photo for the high-school flashbacks; Isabel Macedo, at right, is made up to appear obese.

The high-school years of the main characters are depicted in flashbacks, a recurring element. For comic effect, the flashbacks were filmed with the actors who played the adult characters instead of younger actors. One episode includes a reenactment of the 1980s game show Feliz domingo para la juventud, with an appearance by host Silvio Soldán. This episode also features a guest appearance by Andy Kusnetzoff, who later joined the regular cast. Another episode has a flashback set in Italpark, an Argentine theme park which closed in 1990. Since the Italpark rides are now in Luján, the production moved there to shoot those scenes.

One episode includes a flashback to San Carlos de Bariloche, the location of the graduation trip (an Argentine prom tradition). Pablo Echarri made a guest appearance as the trip's coordinator, and fans of the show were selected in an internet competition to join the trip to Bariloche as extras. Another flashback features the Pumper Nic fast-food restaurant and a guest appearance by sportswriter Juan Pablo Varsky. Not all flashbacks are focused on the 1980s or high school; some are events from a character's adolescence, such as the shotgun wedding of María Laura and Pablo or her 15th birthday.

==== Music ====
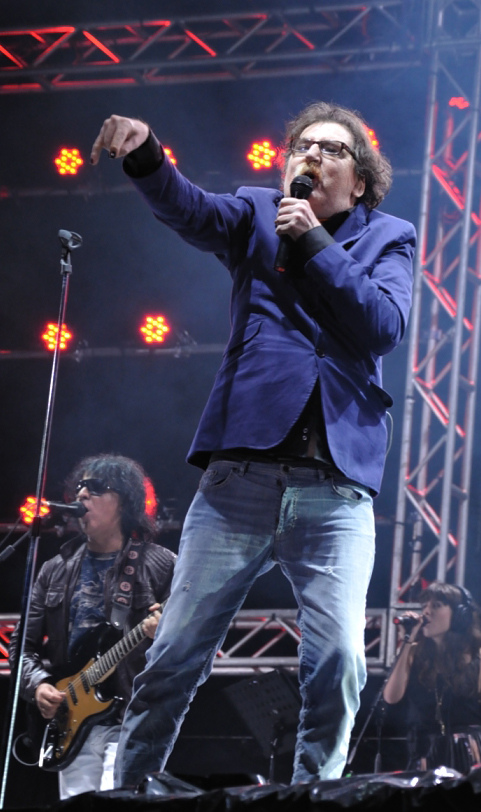
Charly García made a cameo appearance, discussing the lyrics of "Inconsciente colectivo".

The program uses 1980s music (usually Argentine rock) extensively, and several Argentine musicians from the decade were invited to make cameo appearances. Charly García appears in one episode, discussing the lyrics of his song "Inconsciente colectivo" ("Collective Unconscious") with the characters. Fito Páez appears in a flashback, meeting María Laura during a sound check and asking her opinion of his new song "11 y 6". Páez resurrected his 1980s look, which differs slightly from his current appearance.

Musician Emanuel Ortega, brother of producer Sebastián Ortega, appeared (as himself) as Victoria Lauría's patient. Similar plots were used in other episodes, with guest stars appearing as themselves; Victoria Lauría's character became a psychologist with famous clients, such as soccer player Martín Palermo, tennis player Gastón Gaudio, model Luciana Salazar and soccer agent Guillermo Coppola. All performing members of the Ortega family made cameos on the series.

Bahiano, the former singer of Los Pericos, made a cameo appearance in the Spring Day episode and played "El ritual de la banana" ("Ritual of the Banana", Los Pericos' first hit). Bahiano left the band in 2005, and did not maintain a good relationship with them. Los Pericos sent a cease and desist letter to the production team and complained on Twitter about the episode. Bahiano dismissed their reaction as jealousy. The Spring Day episode also included a cameo by Los Twist, who played their hit "El estudiante" ("The Student"). The scene, filmed in Tigre, also included a cameo by Lalo Mir.

==== Holidays and observances ====
Holidays (such as Spring Day) were part of the plot of an episode aired that day, unless the holiday fell over a weekend. Since the Goddzers are a Jewish family, Jewish holidays are included. On July 18 the 1994 AMIA bombing, when the Argentine Israelite Mutual Association was destroyed in a terrorist attack, was mentioned when Elías said he would attend the annual protest of the unsolved case's handling. Minor Jewish characters (such as relatives and friends) returned for Rosh Hashanah, the Jewish New Year celebration. Its Jewish characters and the number of Argentine and Latin American expatriates in Israel helped Graduados obtain good ratings in Israel.

== Reception ==
The first episode of Graduados was a ratings success, scoring nearly 28 points. Subsequent episodes continued to receive high ratings and El Trece, Telefe's main rival for prime-time ratings, competed with Graduados by moving its blockbuster program Showmatch an hour earlier (opposite Graduados). The move was unsuccessful, with Graduados more highly rated than Showmatch before and after the change. Showmatch returned to its original time slot and El Trece aired a new series, Sos mi hombre, opposite Graduados. Sos mi hombre's premiere episode was outscored by Graduados, 26 to 18.4; according to El Trece this was not a disappointment, since its target rating was 17-19 points. Graduados maintained its lead in the ratings for the rest of the season.

It was a multi-target success, with an audience not limited to viewers in their forties as the focus on 1980s nostalgia might have indicated. This countered a contemporary trend in series television to target a specific audience demographic. The plots include characters and situations for all ages, and the series' general tone is family-friendly. Although it includes a number of flashbacks, the scripts did not limit the actors to a 1980s viewpoint; according to consultant Mariela Mociulsky, the show reflects more modern realities (such as men showing their emotions and women having greater autonomy in their lives) than TV shows of the 1980s did.

The series finale was broadcast from the Gran Rex Theater in a ceremony attended by fans who obtained tickets in a raffle on the Telefe website. The cast (except for Ortega and Urtizberea, who were out of the country) attended the performance, watching the episode from a VIP room in the theater, appearing on stage after the episode ended to thank the audience. Also in attendance were actors and musicians who had made guest appearances on the show during the year, including Pablo Ruiz (the singer of Vilma Palma e Vampiros), Sandra Mihanovich, Luciana Salazar, Luisa Albinoni and Max Berliner.

In February 2013 Sebastian Ortega and the cast agreed to produce another season of Graduados after a year off, and Telefe had begun negotiations to bring the series back. The project became a new telenovela, Viudas e hijos del Rock and Roll, which would employ similar themes and most of the cast. Nancy Dupláa left the project, with Paola Barrientos replacing her as the female lead.

=== Awards ===
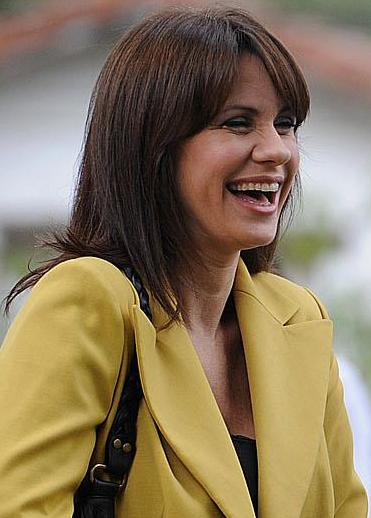
Nancy Dupláa received the Tato Award for best actress in daily drama.

Graduados received 12 Tato Awards from 20 nominations on November 17, 2012, including the special award for Television program of the year. Graduados was nominated for daily serial, fiction production, actress in a daily serial (Nancy Dupláa), arts and images in a fiction program and soundtrack, winning in all those categories. Nominations for new actor, actor in a daily serial, supporting actor in a daily serial and supporting actress in a daily serial were shared. The new-actor award nominees from Graduados were Mercedes Scápola, Gastón Soffritti and the winner, Chang Kim Sung. Luciano Cáceres and Daniel Hendler were nominated for the actor in daily drama award, won by Hendler. Roberto Carnaghi, nominated with Juan Leyrado and Mex Urtizberea, received the Best Supporting Actor in a Daily Serial Award. Paola Barrientos was the best supporting actress in a daily serial; her fellow nominees were Isabel Macedo, Mirta Busnelli and Violeta Urtizberea. The series was nominated for the best fiction director and script awards, both won by the telenovela El hombre de tu vida. Producer Sebastian Ortega refused to attend the ceremony to avoid Marcelo Tinelli, with whom he had an ongoing dispute. With a total of 11 awards Graduados was the most successful production at the ceremony, followed by El hombre de tu vida and La voz argentina with four awards each.

The series received 14 nominations for Martín Fierro Awards and won eight, including the Golden Award. It won awards for best daily serial, production, writing and opening theme, and was nominated for best direction (won by Juan José Campanella for El hombre de tu vida). Daniel Hendler and Luciano Cáceres were nominated for best lead actor in a daily serial, which Hendler won. Paola Barrientos was the best supporting actress in a daily serial, with Mirta Busnelli also nominated. Isabel Macedo and Nancy Dupláa were nominated as best lead actress in a daily serial, and Macedo (not Dupláa, as expected by the cast) won. Chang Sung Kim, Jenny Williams (new actor), Andy Kusnetzoff, Betiana Blum (guest appearance), Mex Urtizberea and Roberto Carnaghi (supporting actor in daily drama) also received nominations.

=== Internet ===
In 2012 the use of hashtags in television was new in Argentina, and programs had limited interaction with social networks. Although in August 2012 Showmatch had a higher number of tweets than Graduados (despite trailing it in the ratings), by October Graduados was the 2012 Argentine TV program with the highest number of tweets (averaging 244,540 per episode). Showmatch was second, with an average of 203,922 tweets per episode. As of October 14, September 3 was the day with the greatest number of tweets for a single episode (47,357).

A September 2012 analysis of tweets found that Graduados was the Argentine television program most frequently mentioned. The most popular characters were Vero Diorio, Dany Goddzer, Pablo Catáneo, Guillermo Almada, Tuca and Vicky Lauría. Several unofficial Twitter accounts were created by fans and modeled after the characters; the best known was @Jimena_Benitez_ (Patricia Longo's character account), with 12,765 followers.

== Other media ==
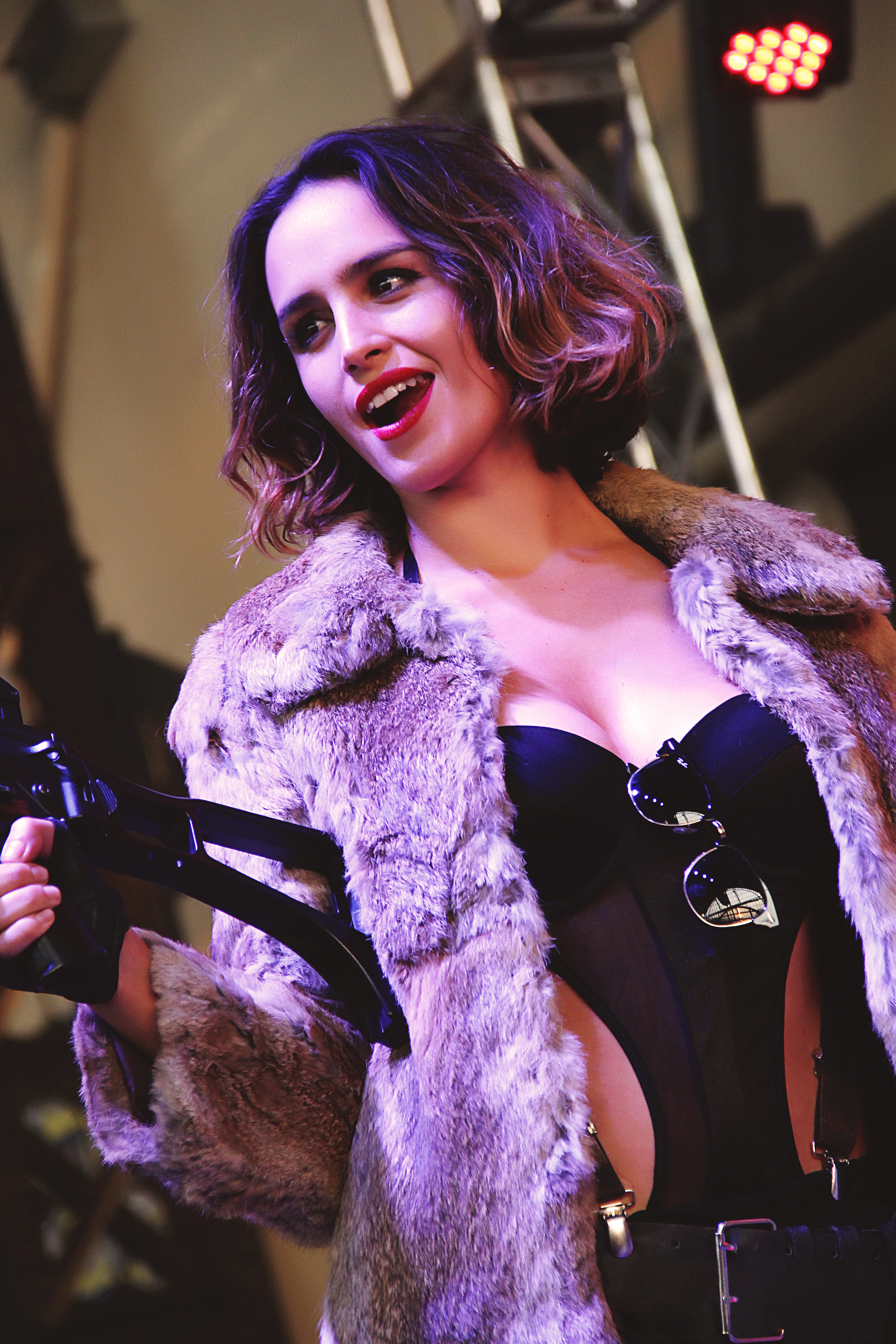
Fernanda Urrejola starred in the Chilean version of Graduados.

The producers of Graduados released a compilation album of music used in the series. It features the theme song, composed by Tan Biónica, and 1980s Argentine rock hits as background music. Musicians appearing on the album are Soda Stereo, Los Fabulosos Cadillacs, Charly García, Sumo, Virus, Raúl Porchetto, Andrés Calamaro, Los Violadores, Suéter and Los Ratones Paranoicos. The first CD went gold in Argentina, encouraging Telefe and Sony Music Entertainment to release a second CD of soft songs by international artists. Artists on the second CD are Bonnie Tyler, Europe, Paul Young, Jimmy Harnen, Spandau Ballet, Dover, Martika, The Alan Parsons Project, Toto, The Bangles, Cyndi Lauper, Bad English, Air Supply and Billy Joel.

As the series wound down, Telefe considered a theatrical version for the 2013 summer season. It would have been similar to a 2010 version by the producers of Valientes, but the cast had other commitments. Telefe then asked series creator Sebastian Ortega to make a film. Negotiations were confirmed by producer Pablo Culell, who said that although Underground produces television series it can also produce stage plays and films.

Chilevisión produced a Chilean version of the series, Graduados, historias que no se olvidan (Graduates: Unforgettable Stories). The first remake produced by the station, it starred Fernanda Urrejola, Marcial Tagle and Ricardo Fernández and its soundtrack features Chilean bands (such as Upa and Los Prisioneros) and Argentine bands successful in Chile (such as Soda Stereo, Charly García and Virus). The production tries to reflect 1980s Chilean life in a broad appeal to audiences. A Colombian version debuted on RCN Televisión on September 18, 2014 to low ratings. Symmathites, a Greek version, airs on Antenna TV. In Mexico, TV Azteca bought the rights for a local version in production as of November 2013. The original telenovela has aired in Panama, El Salvador and Nicaragua. A Serbian version debuted on Prva Srpska Televizija on September 25, 2017, titled Istine i laži (Truths and lies).

== Adaptations ==
Graduados was adapted for Greek television as a soap opera called Symmathites (Εnglish: Classmates). It premiered in ANT1 on October 28, 2014, and concluded on July 28, 2017. Set in Athens, Greece, the show centers upon the life of some classmates 18 years after their graduation and how their lives continue after that.
