= Gabriela Goddzer =

- 'Graduados' character
- Gabriela Goddzer, played by Violeta Urtizberea
- Portrayed by: Violeta Urtizberea
- Duration: 2012
In-universe information
- Other names: Gaby
- Occupation: Secretary
- Family: Goddzer
- Parents: Elías and Dana Goddzer
- Siblings: Andrés Goddzer
- Spouse: Tito
- Nieces and nephews: Martín Catáneo
- First cousins: Daniel Goddzer

Gabriela Goddzer is a fictional character in the 2012 Argentine telenovela Graduados. She is played by Violeta Urtizberea.

== Character creation ==
Mex Urtizberea and Violeta Urtizberea are father and daughter. Violeta began to work in the series ignoring that they were both in cast, and requested to have her own space in it. As a result, their characters have very limited joint scenes.

== Awards ==
Violeta Urtizberea has been nominated for the 2012 Tato awards for her work with the character.
