= Gasoleros =

- Genre: Comedy
- Created by: Adrián Suar
- Written by: Gustavo Barrios; Ernesto Korovsky
- Directed by: Oscar Rodríguez; Sebastián Pivotto
- Starring: Juan Leyrado; Mercedes Morán; Silvia Montanari; Pablo Rago; Nicolás Cabré; Manuel Callau; Cecilia Milone; Dady Brieva
- Theme music composer: Vicentico
- Opening theme: Gasolero
- Country of origin: Argentina
- Original language: Spanish
- No. of seasons: 2
- No. of episodes: 464

Production
- Producer: Pol-ka
- Production location: Buenos Aires
- Running time: 60 minutes

Original release
- Network: Canal 13
- Release: January 5, 1998 – December 30, 1999

Related
- Carola Casini; Campeones de la vida

Gasoleros is an Argentine telenovela issued between 1998 and 1999 by Canal 13. It aired at 9:00 p.m. during prime time, Monday through Friday. It was produced by Pol-ka and the original idea was from Adrián Suar. The musical theme of the introduction is Gasolero from Vicentico.

== Plot ==
The story is based on the daily life of the Panigasi family, an impoverished middle class family. The father of the family is Héctor Panigassi (Juan Leyrado), a former bus collector who became a mechanic, who has a workshop with family and friends. Roxana Presutti (Mercedes Morán), a woman married to a man she thinks she loves, Jorge Martínez Olmos, until she meets Héctor. Emilia (Silvia Montanari), it is another central character in the plot, which has a bar that she got with a lot of effort, place in which many of the stories emerged throughout the series will occur.

== Cast ==
=== Protagonists ===
- Juan Leyrado as Héctor Melchor Panigassi
- Mercedes Morán as Roxana María Presutti
- Silvia Montanari as Emilia Nieto
- Pablo Rago as Bonzo
- Dady Brieva as Alberto "Tucho" Regüeyo

=== Co-protagonists ===
- Nicolás Cabré as Alejo Felman Presutti
- Manuel Callau as Jorge Martínez Olmos
- Cecilia Milone as Isabel Panigassi

=== Recurring cast ===
- Héctor Bidonde as Benito Carrasco
- Alejandro Fiore as Juan Carlos "Vikingo" Eguía
- Melina Petriella as Valeria Martínez Olmos
- Mariano Martínez as Diego Lázaro
- Verónica Llinás as Alicia "Chula" Rivarola
- China Zorrilla as Matilde Arévalo de Presutti
- Nicolás Pauls as Sebastián
- Jimena Barón as Betina
- Valeria Bertuccelli as Elbita
- Rubén Rada as Liber
- Malena Solda as Luciana Nieto
- Matías Santoianni as Darío Panigassi
- Yaco González as Palo Santich
- María Fiorentino as Felicidad García
- Fabián Mazzei as Marcelo Gutiérrez
- Pamela Rodríguez as Sandra Nieto
- Luciano Leyrado as Javier
- Matias Camisani as Esteban
- Favio Posca as Bambi

=== Participations ===
- Víctor Laplace as Gustavo Piccolo
- Carlos Roffé as Elías Fortunatto
- Martín Seefeld as Martín Ferreyra
- Carola Reyna as Andrea Nuñez
- Patricia Castell as Irma Olmos
- Enrique Morales as Carlos Martínez Olmos
- Alejandra Da Passano as Berta Rosenthal
- Martín Adjemián as Gregorio Rosenthal
- Héctor Anglada as Rubén Benítez
- Carina Zampini as Vera Vázquez
- Cristina Banegas as Dr. Eva Belloso
- Juan Darthés as Pedro
- Gabriela Toscano as Graciela
- Claudia Fontán as Marina
- Coraje Ábalos as Juan
- Sandra Smith as Nancy
- Érica Rivas as Paula
- Andrea Campbell as Verónica
- Julieta Díaz as Jimena
- Mercedes Scápola as Teresa
- Laura Miller as Gladys
- Vivian El Jaber as Dina
- Alejandro Lerner as Federico
- Martín Karpan as Rubén
- Juan Gil Navarro as Wolfrang
- Violeta Urtizberea as Milena
- Claudia Albertario as Tamara
- Diego Peretti Arturo
- Carmen Vallejo as Concepción
- Alejo García Pintos as Alvarito
- Mirta Busnelli as Ana Clara
- Mike Amigorena as Matías
- Luciano Cáceres as Nicolás
- Joaquín Furriel as Gerardo
- Adrián Yospe as Fabio
- Carlos Calvo as Rodolfo Rojas
- María Leal as Ana Salinas
- Héctor Calori as Sergio Felman
- Diana Lamas as Marisa Ramos
- Osvaldo Santoro as Mario "Turco" Abdala
- Rubén Ballester as Guillermo "Willy" García
- Mario Alarcón as Fernando Belloso
- Agustina Posse as Jessica Rosenthal
- Ricardo Puente as Ricardo Fortunatto
- Mercedes Funes as Claudia Ferreyra
- Carlos Bermejo as Eduardo Manfredi
- María Elena Sagrera as Dora Salinas
- Alejandra Gavilanes as Laura Márquez Gentile
- Noelia Noto as Andrea Carrasco
- Guadalupe Martínez Uría as María Etcheverry
- Ernesto Larrese as Horacio de Vicenci
- Camila Gotkin as Violeta Panigassi
- Sofía Palomino as Sandra Nieto
- Miguel Dedovich as Horacio
- Max Berliner as Barzuc
- Sergio Surraco as Frankie
- Gabo Correa as Óscar
- María Ibarreta as Alita
- Emilia Mazer as Elena
- Divina Gloria as Lorena
- Aníbal Silveyra as Mauro
- Claudia Flores as Julieta
- Marina Skell as Alicia
- Silvia Pérez as Karina
- Mariana Richaudeau as Sofía
- Jazmín Rodríguez as Mariana
- Maida Andrenacci as Antonella
- Anahí Martella as Silvia
- Emilio Bardi as José
- Rodrigo Aragón as Raúl
- Moro Anghileri as Paloma
- Diego Jalfen as Tomás
- Carlos Portaluppi as Gerardo
- Marcelo Cosentino as Ricardo
- Edgardo Moreira as Néstor
- Gabriel Lennb as Suca
- Isabel Spagnuolo as Marta
- Rubén Green as Walter
- Juan Vitali as Tulio
- César Vianco as Rodrigo
- Alex Benn as Agustín
- Mónica Santibáñez as Norma
- Sandra Ballesteros as Mónica
- Luciano Comte as Felipe
- Germán Liotto as Daniel
- Regina Lamm as Irene
- Boris Rubaja as Rafael
- Lucrecia Capello as Zulema
- Cira Caggiano as Mónica
- Mónica Gazpio as Leonor
- Luis Minces as Eusebio
- Carlos Moreno as Miguel
- Tina Serrano as Tití
- Inés Paz as Soledad
- Isabel Quinteros as Rita
- Eugenia Tobal as Fiona
- Gastón Domínguez as Diego
- Ana María Caso as Elsa
- Peto Menahem as Héctor
- Patricio Arellano as Ariel
- Agustín Palermo as Nicolás
- Claudio Rissi as Willy
- Edda Díaz as Dora
- Edda Bustamante as Victoria
- Boy Olmi as Mauro
- Paulo Brunetti as Pablo
- Rita Terranova as Mónica
- Coni Marino as Cecilia
- Santiago Ríos as Alexis
- Alberto Busaid as Malvicino
- Antonio Ugo as Arditti
- Paula Martínez as Azucena
- Cecilia Labourt as Haydée
- Liliana Pécora as Nelly
- Fito Yanelli as Miguel
- Silvia Armoza as Nilda
- Francisco Fernández de Rosa as Hernán
- Nazarena Vélez as Gricelda
- Julián Marti as Bubi
- Ira Fronten as Shannon
