= Martín Catáneo =

- Graduados character
- Portrayed by: Gastón Soffritti
- Duration: 2012
In-universe information
- Occupation: High school student
- Family: Catáneo
- Parents: María Laura Falsini, Andrés Goddzer
- Adoptive parents: Pablo Catáneo
- Grandparents: Clemente Falsini, Elías Goddzer, Dana Blatt de Goddzer
- Aunts and uncles: Augusto Giribone, Gabriela Goddzer

Martín Catáneo is a fictional character in the 2012 Argentine telenovela Graduados. He is played by Gastón Soffritti.

== Fictional biography ==
Martín Catáneo was born as the son of Pablo Catáneo and María Laura Falsini, but he discovered at the age of 18 that he was actually the son of Andrés Goddzer, a fellow high school student of her mother, who had sex with him in the graduation night. During the series he adapted to the circumstances of having two parents.

== Character creation ==
Gastón Soffritti worked in Graduados, departing from the teen drama genre, as he wanted to try other ones. He received the proposal while making a short production for América 2. To design his character he had interviews with all the other actors who played roles linked with it; this included most of the cast because his character was a nexus between the two families of the plot, the firm and the school. He praised the actress Nancy Dupláa, who played his mother in the fiction.

== Awards ==
Gastón Soffritti was nominated for the 2012 Tato Award, as new actor.
