= Guillermo Almada (Graduados) =

Fictional character

Guillermo Almada is a fictional character in the 2012 Argentine telenovela Graduados. He is played by Juan Gil Navarro.

== Fictional biography ==
Guillermo Almada was a high school student in the 1980s, friend of the school bully Pablo Catáneo. He came out of the closet during a reunion of former students, and was supported by everybody, except Pablo. Victoria Lauría, who used to have a crush on him, stayed as his friend, and helped him with his partner's daughter. Guillermo Almada got married by the end of the series.

== Character creation and reception ==
Juan Gil Navarro usually works in dramas, and accepted to work in a comedy telenovela after a suggestion of his wife.

The character starred the first fictional same-sex marriage in Argentina, which had been legalized a short time before.
