= Urtizberea =

Urtizberea is a surname. Notable people with the surname include:

- Mex Urtizberea (born 1960), Argentine musician
- Santiago Urtizberea (1909–1985), Spanish footballer
- Violeta Urtizberea (born 1985), Argentine actress
