= Dana Blatt de Goddzer =

Dana Blatt de Goddzer is a fictional character in the 2012 Argentine telenovela Graduados. She is played by Mirta Busnelli.

== Awards ==
Misrta Busnelli has been nominated to the 2012 Tato Awards and Martín Fierro Awards for her work with the character.
