= 100 días para enamorarse (Argentine TV series) =

Argentine telenovela

- Title card
- Also known as: 100 Days to Fall in Love
- Cien días para enamorarse
- Genre: Telenovela; Comedy
- Created by: Sebastián Ortega
- Written by: Silvina Frejdkes; Keyber Rojas; Alejandro Quesada
- Directed by: Mariano Ardanaz; Pablo Ambrosini
- Starring: Carla Peterson; Nancy Dupláa; Luciano Castro; Juan Minujín; Constantine Ganosis
- Opening theme: "A punto" by Amigos Raros
- Country of origin: Argentina
- Original language: Spanish
- No. of episodes: 125

Production
- Executive producer: Leandro Cullel
- Producer: Osvaldo Codazzi
- Editors: Laura Pallotini; Jonathan Smeke
- Running time: 60 minutes
- Production company: Underground Producciones

Original release
- Network: Telefe
- Release: 7 May – 12 December 2018

Cien días para enamorarse (transl. 100 Days to Fall in Love, stylized as 100 días para enamorarse) is a 2018 Argentine telenovela produced by Underground Producciones and broadcast by Telefe from 7 May to 12 December 2018.

== Plot ==
Laura and Antonia, best friends since adolescence, decide to put their love bonds to the test. Despite being very close, they are very different. Laura is a successful upper class lawyer, a lover of organic food and sometimes a naive mother. Antonia is a strong working-class woman, who raised her child by herself.

Laura is married to Gastón and Antonia has a relationship with the father of her daughter, although both consider that their respective relationships have worn away with the passage of time.

Laura and Gastón decide to sign a contract to separate for a hundred days, with the aim of testing the love that once united them and, at the same time, discover other forms of love.

After Laura's decision, Antonia decides to follow the same path.

Meanwhile, Antonia's child, Juani, transitions.

== Cast ==
=== Main ===
- Carla Peterson as Laura Contempomi. She is a successful high class lawyer who lives in the neighborhood of Puerto Madero, Buenos Aires, along with her husband Gastón and her children Santiago and Rodrigo. Laura is an intelligent woman, protective of her family and friends and, sometimes, a slightly naive mother.
- Nancy Dupláa as Antonia Salinas. She is a strong working-class woman. She grew up in her father's car shop, developing a strong character that often makes her collide with other people. Despite being like water and oil, Antonia is Laura's inseparable best friend.
- Luciano Castro as Diego Castelnuovo. He is an old friend of the group returning from Chile after having disappeared for more than a decade. Diego is a successful and lonely gynecologist, whose life will take an unexpected turn when he learns that he has a child in common with Antonia that he does not know.
- Juan Minujín as Gastón Guevara. Laura's husband and Rodrigo and Santiago's father. Gastón carries out the Guevara-Contempomi law firm with his wife, and the constant marital fights are the cause of the separation pact that begins the plot. Gastón, a somewhat selfish man, tries to adapt to the new times by being a good father.
- Constantine Ganosis as Juan Fianci

=== Co-starring ===
- Pablo Rago as Jorge "Coco" Carulias. Antonia's husband, he is a "careless" man, a fan of rock music and a womanizer, but with a good heart.
- Juan Gil Navarro as Javier Fernández Prieto. Ines' husband, he is a bigamist and maintains a double life in San Antonio de Areco, a town in the province of Buenos Aires.
- Jorgelina Aruzzi as Inés Sosa. She is a lawyer at the Guevara-Contemponi law firm and Javier's wife. She is an unpredictable woman, nymphomaniac, and flirtatious.
- Osvaldo Laport as Gino Salinas. Antonia's father. He is a classic and conservative man, who is deeply affected by his grandson's gender identity.
- Ludovico Di Santo as Paul Contempomi. Laura's brother. He is in love with Fidel, the literature professor at Rodrigo and Juan's school.
- Michel Noher as Fidel Garrido. The school's Literature professor. His sexuality is questioned when he meets Paul.
- Leticia Siciliani as Carmen. The secretary, assistant and head of Human Resources of the Guevara-Contempomi study. She studies Advocacy and is a little ignorant girl, who usually takes sides with Laura in the fights she has with Gastón. She usually calls Gastón a "pig". She discovers a passion for being a YouTuber.
- Mario Pasik as Miguel Contempomi. He is the father of Laura and Paul.
- Maite Lanata as Juan "Juani" Salinas Castelnuovo. The son of Antonia and Diego. At the beginning of the series, Juani is a young woman struggling with her gender identity, who does not feel comfortable with her body and who, as the series progresses, transitions to Juan, facing all the social obstacles that being a transgender boy entails, both in his family and school environment. Juan falls in love with Emma, one of his schoolmates.
- Franco Rizzaro as Rodrigo Contempomi Guevara. The son of Laura and Gastón, older brother of Santiago, and Juan's best friend. Rodrigo is a little problematic boy and is interested in becoming a DJ.
- Macarena Paz as Catalina Connor. She is Fidel's ex-wife and an English teacher at the school.
- Marita Ballesteros as Bea Méndez de Contempomi. She is the mother of Laura and Paul.
- Jeremías Batto Colini as Santiago Contempomi Guevara. He is the second son of Laura and Gastón and Rodrigo's younger brother.

=== Recurring ===
- Manuela Pal as Florencia Fernández Berra. She is Javier's second wife and lives in San Antonio de Areco. Nicolas' mother.
- Marina Bellati as Solange. She is Emma and Aaron's mother.
- Graciela Tenenbaum as Raquel. She is the house worker at Laura and Gastón's house.
- Lola Toledo as Azul Garrido, Fidel and Catalina's daughter.
- Fiorela Duranda as Julieta Fernández Sosa, Ines and Javier's daughter.
- Luz Palazón es Lidia Molfino, the school's principal.
- Agustina Midlin as Luli Cerberos
- Malena Narvay as Emma, Juan and Rodrigo's classmate and Juan's love interest.
- Cawi Blaksley as Amparo, Fidel's niece who transfers to the school. Rodrigo's love interest.
- Jerónimo Bosia Giocondo as Tomás.
- Junior Pisanu as Facundo
- Facundo Calvo as Ciro
- Lucía Maciel as Norma
- Paula Cancio as Clara Garrido
- Tomás Ottaviano as Nicolás Fernández Berra
- Antonella Ferrari as Charo Solís
- Juan Guilera as Matías Murano

=== Special participations ===
- Noelia Marzol as Vanesa Perla
- Luciano Cáceres as Nicolás Pianiza
- Moria Casán as Brígida Sandoval
- Luciana Salazar as Silvia Cafa
- Eleonora Wexler as Renata Grimaldi
- Marco Antonio Caponi as Gonzalo
- Julieta Zylberberg as Patricia
- Benjamín Vicuña as Emiliano Iturria
- Verónica Llinás as Alicia Castelnuovo
- Mex Urtizberea as Félix
- Muriel Santa Ana as Anette Guevara
- Daniel Hendler as Mariano Solís
- Violeta Urtizberea as Valeria Baños
- Sandra Mihanovich as Dr. Nancy Ventura
- Virginia da Cunha as Celeste
- Facundo Espinosa as Aníbal
- Gustavo Conti as Hernán
- Paola Barrientos as Bettina
- Abril Sánchez as Laura Contempomi (teenager)
- Lucila Torn as Antonia Salinas (teenager)
- Joaquín Flamini as Gastón Guevara (teenager)
- Agustin Vera as Diego Castelnuovo (teenager)
- Gabriel Epstein as Paul Contempomi (teenager)
- Victorio D'Alessandro as Sandro "Machete" González
- Andrea Rincón as Deborah Costa
- Justina Bustos as Ángeles Chicco Ruiz
- Lola Morán as Soledad
- Julieta Rojo as Mora
- Gonzalo Altamirano as Aarón
- Alma Gandini as Sandra
- Malena Villa as Sofía
- Jennifer Biancucci as Pilar
- Sebastián Wainraich as Paco
- Mauricio Lavaselli as Pancho
- Emilia Claudeville as Eugenia
- Escudero as Magdalena
- Dan Breitman as Guido
- Ivana Nadal as Malena
- Joaquin Berthold as Leonidas
- Julieta Bartolomé as Noelia
- Mauro Álvarez as Géronimo
- Eliseo Barrionuevo as Manu
- Juan Pablo Pagliere as Víctor
- Juan Sorini as Benicio
- Ezequiel Quintana as Ezequiel
- Gastón Ricaud as Dr. Martín
- Luis Jacob as Francisco
- Eugenia Aguilar as Young Bettina
- Daniela Pantano as Úrsula
- Malena Sánchez as Marina
- Laura Cymer as Telma
- Gianfranco De grossi as “Chelo”
- Dalia Gutmann as Animadora de Chicago

== Reception ==
Cien días para enamorarse went on air after the release of the final chapter of El Sultán, and averaged 16.0 rating points in its first installment, with a peak of 17.1 becoming the most watched of the day, surpassing Simona in its timeslot (eltrece, 9:30 p.m.), which obtained an average of 10.2.

== Awards and nominations ==
Year	Award	Category	Nominated	Result
2019	International Emmy Award	Best Telenovela	Cien días para enamorarse	Nominated
