= Clemente Falsini =

Fictional character in the telenovela Graduados

Clemente Falsini is a fictional character in the 2012 Argentine telenovela Graduados. He is played by Juan Leyrado.

== Character creation ==
Juan Leyrado played a grandfather for the first time in his career. His character has not been a secondary character, as most grandfathers in telenovelas, and had a prominent role and his own story arcs. Leyrado, aged 60 at the time of the series, said that he was still active in his personal life and played the character according to his own experiences.

== Awards ==
Juan Leyrado was nominated for the 2012 Tato Award as supporting actor in daily fiction.
