= Victoria Lauría =

- Graduados character
- Victoria Lauría, played by Paola Barrientos
- Portrayed by: Paola Barrientos
- Duration: 2012
- Crossover appearances: Educando a Nina
In-universe information
- Other names: Vicky
- Occupation: Psychologist
- Civil partner: Tuca Pardo

Victoria Lauría is a fictional character in the 2012 Argentine telenovela Graduados. She is played by Paola Barrientos, both as an adult and, in flashbacks, as a teenager. Barrientos. received the Tato Award and the Martín Fierro Award for her work.

== Fictional biography ==
Victoria Lauría was the best friend of María Laura Falsini (Nancy Dupláa) in high school. She had a crush on fellow student Guillermo Almada (Juan Gil Navarro). Lauría and Falsini stayed as friends and confidants after graduation, and Lauría became a psychologist.

Her crush on Almada ended during a meeting of former students, several years later, when he came out of the closet and revealed that he was gay. Lauría stayed as Almada's friend, and helped him with his adoptive daughter. Eventually, she fell in love with Tuca (Mex Urtizberea), another former high school student.

== Character creation ==
Initially, Victoria Lauría was meant to be played by Julieta Ortega. However, Ortega was reassigned to the role of Verónica Diorio after Verónica Lozano turned down that role. Nancy Dupláa, the lead actress of the telenovela, proposed the actress Paola Barrientos for the character. She was advised by a friend, fellow actress Andrea Pietra, who had seen Barrientos at the theater play Estado de Ira (Spanish: State of anger). Paola Barrientos became famous with her work as the character.

Paola Barrientos commented that she proposed her own ideas and input for the design of the character, expanding the initial draft. She included her own views about psychology, and the verbiage of the character.

== Awards ==
Paola Barrientos won the 2012 Tato Award as supporting actress in daily fiction, and the 2012 Martín Fierro Award as secondary actress in daily fiction, for her work in the program. She received her Martín Fierro Award right after that of the investigative journalist Jorge Lanata, who sarcastically thanked president Cristina Fernández de Kirchner and other members of her cabinet for it (Lanata is a vocal critic of them, and headed several controversial investigations about them). Barrientos simply said that she also thanked the people named by Lanata. As her comment was misunderstood as a support to Lanata, she clarified that she did not agree with him.
