= Andrés Goddzer =

- 'Graduados' character
- Andrés Goddzer, played by Daniel Hendler
- Portrayed by: Daniel Hendler
- Duration: 2012
In-universe information
- Other names: Andy
- Occupation: Dog walker
- Family: Goddzer
- Parents: Elías and Dana Goddzer
- Siblings: Gabriela
- Children: Martín Catáneo
- First cousins: Daniel Goddzer

Andrés "Andy" Goddzer is a fictional character in the 2012 Argentine telenovela Graduados (Graduates). He is played by Daniel Hendler, both as an adult and, in flashbacks, as a teenager. Hendler won two awards for his work as the character.

== Fictional biography ==
Andrés Goddzer attended high school in the 1980s, graduating in 1989. He had fallen in love with fellow student María Laura Falsini (Nancy Dupláa), the girlfriend of Pablo Catáneo (Luciano Cáceres). Catáneo cheated on Falsini during their graduation party, so she broke up with him and left with Andrés. They had sex in his car and she became pregnant. As everybody assumed that María Laura was pregnant with Catáneo's child, her father forced them to get married and get jobs; Andrés, the real father of María Laura's child did not know about this. Andrés stayed friends with fellow students Benjamín "Tuca" Pardo (Mex Urtizberea) and Verónica Diorio (Julieta Ortega), who ran a radio station that played 1980s Argentine rock music.

Andrés met María Laura again 18 years later. A DNA test confirmed that he was the biological father of Martín (Gastón Soffritti), María Laura's son. The plots involving Goddzer usually focused on his newly discovered paternity, his renewed love for María Laura, his rivalry with Pablo Catáneo, his passion for rock music and his lack of interest in working.

== Character creation ==
Initially, Andrés Goddzer was meant to be the main character of Graduados, and the name of the telenovela in the early production stages was "El paseaperros" (English: The dog walker). Andy Kusnetzoff was initially cast to play the character, but he left the project to concentrate on his work as a radio host. Mike Amigorena was offered the roles of either Andrés Goddzer or Pablo Catáneo, but rejected both. Daniel Hendler, who had already joined the cast as Benjamín Pardo, eventually switched roles to play Goddzer. Mex Urtizberea joined the cast to play Pardo instead, and Kusnetzoff eventually joined the cast anyway to play another character.

The telenovela includes several flashbacks to the times when the characters attended high school. As with the other characters, Hendler played Andrés Goddzer both as an adult and as a teenager, for comic effect.

== Awards ==
Hendler won the 2012 Tato Award as best actor in daily fiction, and the 2012 Martín Fierro Award as best lead actor in daytime fiction for his work as the character.
