= Los vecinos en guerra =

- Also known as: Vecinos en guerra
- Genre: Romantic comedy
- Created by: Sebastián Ortega
- Written by: Ernesto Korovsky; Silvina Frejdkes; Alejandro Quesada
- Directed by: Miguel Colom; Javier Pérez; Pablo Ambrosini
- Starring: Diego Torres; Eleonora Wexler; Mónica Antonópulos; Marco Antonio Caponi; Mike Amigorena; Juan Gil Navarro
- Theme music composer: Icona Pop featuring Charli XCX
- Opening theme: "I Love It"
- Country of origin: Argentina
- Original language: Spanish
- No. of seasons: 1
- No. of episodes: 146

Production
- Executive producer: Gustavo Errico
- Producers: Sebastián Ortega; Pablo Culell
- Production location: Buenos Aires
- Running time: 60 minutes

Original release
- Network: Telefe
- Release: April 15, 2013 – January 2, 2014

Related
- Graduados

Los vecinos en guerra (Spanish: Neighbors at war), also stylized as Vecinos en guerra, is an Argentine television comedy produced by Underground Contenidos and Endemol which premiered on April 15, 2013 and ended on January 2, 2014. Written by Ernesto Korovsky, Silvina Frejdkes and Alejandro Quesada, it is an original idea of Sebastián Ortega, with the integral management of Miguel Colom. It stars an ensemble cast including Diego Torres, Eleonora Wexler, Mónica Antonópulos, Marco Antonio Caponi, Mike Amigorena, and Juan Gil Navarro.

== Premise ==
Mercedes Maidana, a 40-year-old housewife, was part of a group of scammers twenty years prior and nobody in her current life knows about this. In the past, her name was Lisa and she worked with Álex López, who recruited her for this type of tasks and became her first love, and Ciro Nieto, with whom he planned and financed the scams. A robbery failed and the group disbanded. Mercedes, with a changed identity, began a new life away from scams. She married Rafael Crespo and they had three children, who know absolutely nothing about their past, while living a normal life. One morning, they discover that a new family, the Mayorga, moves to the most luxurious and sought-after house in the neighborhood. Mercedes is shocked to learn that the family man is Álex, whom she believed dead. Ciro leaves prison after twenty years and begins serving house arrest. He seeks revenge from his former partners for the crime he blames for having been imprisoned from his residence. The return of Álex to the life of Mercedes aims to conquer her again and to achieve his purpose he is in charge of hiring a group of actors to pretend to be a normal family and thus, be able to be close to Mercedes without attracting attention.

== Cast ==
=== Starring ===
- Diego Torres as Rafael Crespo Butilengo
- Eleonora Wexler as Lisa Ramos / Mercedes "Mecha" Maidana
- Mónica Antonópulos as Ivana Fernández / Ivana Barreiro
- Marco Antonio Caponi as Fernando Vitelli
- Mike Amigorena as Alejo "Alex" López / Alejo "Alex" Mayorga
- Juan Gil Navarro as Mariano Sánchez Ginastera

=== Co-starring ===
- Mirta Busnelli as Sonia Butilengo de Crespo
- Jorgelina Aruzzi as Nora "Norita" Sotelo
- Carlos Portaluppi as Jorge "Coco" Dellamonica

=== Recurring ===
- Candela Vetrano as Paloma Crespo Maidana
- Lola Berthet as Miriam "Mimí" Bermejo
- Chang Sung Kim as Roque Dudú
- Alan Sabbagh as Fabián Sotelo
- Gastón Soffritti as Lucas Galetto / Lucas Mayorga Barreiro
- Juan Pablo Geretto as Emilio / Reina
- Hugo Arana as Ramón Freire / Ramón Barreiro
- Carola Reyna as Helena "Helen" Sotelo
- Sabrina Fogolini as Agustina Joglar Sotelo
- Lucio Rogati as Valentino Dellamonica Sotelo
- Román Almaraz as Teo Crespo Maidana

=== Guest ===
- Marcela Kloosterboer as Carolina del Río
- Luis Ziembrowski as Ciro Nieto
- Antonio Gasalla as Alberto Mercado
- Mario Pasik as Miguel del Río
- Mex Urtizberea as Benjamín "Tuca" Pardo
- Emilia Attias as Lupe Villanueva
- Susú Pecoraro as Teresa Rodríguez
- Alejandro Fiore as Mario Gasparini
- Daniel Aráoz as Gustavo José Errico
- Diego Mesaglio as Lorenzo "Lolo" Bermejo
- Pablo Alarcón as Antonio "Tony" Ríos Salgado
- Coraje Ábalos as Sergio Bernal
- Emilio Disi as Luis Alberto
- Nazareno Casero as Nicolás
- Mariano Argento as Mullinqui
- Lucrecia Blanco as María Ofelia Sacristán
- Fabián Arenillas as Carlos "Charly" Aguirre
- Sheila González as Dalma "La Gallega" Escudero
- Victoria Carreras as Laura Pereyra
- Tomás de las Heras as Julián Pereyra
- Fernando Sily as Norman Ramírez
- Luz Cipriota as Ana Rodríguez
- Gabo Correa as Eduardo Patenza
- Esteban Masturini as Matías Alberto Patenza
- Gastón Ricaud as Jimmy Oftrof
- Natalie Pérez as Valeria Acosta
- Victoria Almeida as Paula de Bregowi
- Pamela Rodriguez as Romina Piatti
- Guillermo Pfening as Eduardo Germano
- Ariel Staltari as Gerardo Rosales
- Marcelo Mazzarello as Francisco "Pancho" Joglar
- Luciano Conti as Luciano "Rulo" Bermejo
- Juan Pablo Mirabelli as Juan Carlos "Juanqui" Beltrán
- Carla Pandolfi as Laura Garay
- Natalia Figueiras as Silvina
- Iván Espeche as Javier
- Lis Moreno as Martina
- Lucas Lagré as Lautaro
- Lola Bezerra as Manuela
- Florencia Miller as Jimena
- Andrea Estévez as Lucía
- Mónica Salvador as Estela
- Ernesto Korovsky as Pablo
- Luis Sabatini as Rodolfo
- Agustín Pardella as Nahuel
- Florencia Benítez as Alina
- María Nela Sinisterra as María
- Mauricio Lavaselli as Manuel
- Florencia Raggi as Lila
- Carolina Barbosa as Anette
- Lara Ruiz as Yamila
- Lucas Velasco as Jony
- Carina Gallucci as Victoria
- Harry Havilio as Goyo
- Néstor Zacco as Grimaldi
- Claudio Rissi as Méndez
- Natalia Cociuffo as Beba
- Michel Noher
- Fede Medina

== Reception ==
The 2013 prime time of Argentine television is highly disputed by the channels El Trece and Telefe. El Trece airs Solamente Vos and Farsantes, and Telefe airs Los Vecinos en Guerra and Celebrity Splash!, both channels with similar ratings.

== Awards ==
=== Nominations ===
- 2013 Martín Fierro Awards
  - Best comedy
  - Best actor of daily comedy (Diego Torres)
  - Best actor of daily fiction (Mike Amigorena)
  - Best secondary actor (Mario Pasik)
  - Best secondary actress (Mirta Busnelli)
  - Best new actor or actress (Juan Pablo Geretto)
