= Patricia Longo =

- Graduados character
- Jimena Benitez, played by Isabel Macedo
- Portrayed by: Isabel Macedo
- Duration: 2012
In-universe information
- Other names: Jimena Benìtez
- Occupation: Secretary
- Civil partner: Pablo Catáneo
- Stepchildren: Martín Catáneo

Patricia Longo, also known as Jimena Benìtez, is a fictional character in the 2012 Argentine telenovela Graduados. She is played by Isabel Macedo, both as an adult and, in flashbacks, as a teenager.

== Fictional biography ==
Jimena Benìtez attended high school in the 1980s, graduating in 1989. As a very obese girl, she was victim of school bullying, but fell in love with the main bully, Pablo Catáneo. She took part in a fitness program after graduation, and used cosmetic surgery to change her face. She also changed her name to Patricia Longo, and got a job in Mc Can, ignoring that Pablo worked there as well. In time, she would meet again all her former classmates, but never revealed her secret identity. María Laura Falsini, Pablo's wife, was the first to figure it out. She had a romance with Pablo, got pregnant from him, and stayed with him when Pablo and Marìa got divorced.

== Creation ==
Macedo, a thin actress, had to be heavily made up to become obese for the flashback scenes. Initially, she was the villain of the telenovela; the bullying was her motivation for taking revenge on her former classmates.

Isabel Macedo has played villains in several works, including Floricienta. She took the role of Patricia Longo/Jimena Benitez character because it was something she had not done before. Initially, Patricia's past identity as Jimena was intended to remain secret for only ten episodes, but Macedo insisted that the mystery should be maintained for longer. She read about the experiences of victims of school bullying to inform her character and declined other work during the year to stay focused on the series, eventually becoming emotionally attached to her character.

== Awards ==
Isabel Macedo was nominated for the 2012 Tato Award as best supporting actress in daily fiction for her work as the character, but did not receive the award. She received the Martín Fierro Awards in a later ceremony, as lead actress of daily fiction.
