= Chang Sung Kim =

Korean-Argentine actor

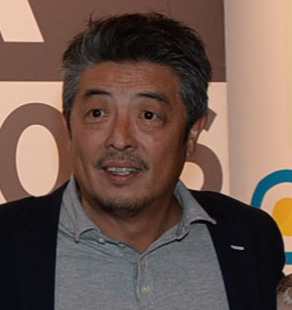
- Kim in 2016
- Born: January 3, 1960 (age 66); Daejeon, South Korea
- Occupation: Actor
- Notable work: Graduados
- Spouse: Clarisa Waldman
- Awards: Tato Award as new actor

Chang Sung Kim is a Korean-Argentine actor. He works in the 2012 telenovela Graduados and has received the Tato Award for his work in Graduados.

== Biography ==
Chang Sung Kim (Korean:김창성) moved from South Korea to Buenos Aires with his family at the age of 7, without knowledge of the Spanish language. He studied karate, and got the Black belt rank. Married to the actress Clarisa Waldman, he gave up his job of weaving at the age of 35, and began an acting career as well, as he saw that she enjoyed doing it. Chang Sung Kim studied in the theater school of Raúl Serrano. He worked in TV series as Hombres de Honor and Los Simuladores, and films as Pompeya, Viudas and Mi primera boda.

He worked in the 2012 telenovela Graduados as Walter Mao, the assistant of the owner of a firm played by Juan Leyrado. This is his first steady job in a television series, as he had only worked as a supporting role so far. He pointed that, unlike his previous plays, his character in Graduados avoids the usual stereotypes of Asian people, such as the perceived lack of language fluency. His character, albeit Asian, includes several Argentine customs; Sung feels Argentine himself, despite lacking citizenship. The writers initially envisioned a character similar to Waylon Smithers from The Simpsons; Sung thought that the idea would not work and provided his own ideas to outline the character. As his character would be a dog in the Chinese astrology, he included traits of a dog in it, such as the loyalty; and although he never worked with Leyrado he admires his work. An episode of the series included a parody of the "Gangnam Style" dance by the South Korean rapper Psy. He received a Tato Bores award for his work in the telenovela, as new actor.

He has signed to work in the 2013 comedy that Underground productions will produce at the end of Graduados.

== Works ==
=== Television ===
Year	TV series	Channel
1994	Gerente de familia	El Trece
2002-2003	Los simuladores	Telefe
2003	Rincón de luz	
2005	Criminal	Canal 9
2005	Floricienta	El Trece
2005	Hombres de honor	El Trece
2011	Supertorpe	Telefe
2012	Según Roxi	MSN
2012	Graduados	Telefe
2013	Los Vecinos en Guerra	Telefe

=== Films ===
Year	Film
2003	Bottom of the Sea
2004	Los esclavos felices, la secta
2005	Visiones, no todo es lo que parece
2008	S.O.S. Ex
2010	Pompeya
2011	Widows
2011	My First Wedding
2025	Hijo Mayor

== Awards ==
Year	Award	For
2012	Tato Award as new actor	Graduados
