= Busnelli =

Busnelli is a surname. Notable people with the surname include:

- Max Busnelli (born 1975), Italian racing car driver
- Mirta Busnelli (born 1946), Argentine actress
