= Elías Goddzer =

Elías Goddzer is a fictional character in the 2012 Argentine telenovela Graduados. He is played by Roberto Carnaghi.

== Awards ==
Roberto Carnaghi won the 2012 Tato Award as "Supporting actor in daily fiction" for his work with the character. He has also been nominated for the 2012 Martín Fierro Awards as "Secondary actor in daily fiction".
