= Yosi, the Regretful Spy =

- Iosi, el espía arrepentido
- Genre: Thriller; Drama
- Created by: Daniel Burman
- Starring: Natalia Oreiro; Gustavo Bassani; Alejandro Awada; Carla Quevedo; Juan Leyrado; Marco Antonio Caponi; Daniel Kuzniecka
- Composer: Federico Jusid
- Countries of origin: Argentina; Uruguay
- Original language: Spanish
- No. of seasons: 2
- No. of episodes: 16

Production
- Executive producers: Silvina Chaine; Daniel Burman; Laura Fernández Espeso
- Production locations: Montevideo; Canelones
- Cinematography: Rodrigo Pulpeiro
- Editors: Alejandro Carrillo Penovi; Alejandro Parysow
- Running time: 39–53 minutes
- Production companies: Oficina Burman; The Mediapro Studio

Original release
- Network: Amazon Prime Video
- Release: 29 April 2022 – 27 October 2023

Yosi, the Regretful Spy (Spanish: Iosi, el espía arrepentido) is an Argentine-Uruguayan thriller television series created by Daniel Burman for Amazon Prime Video and based on the 2015 book Iosi, el espía arrepentido by authors Horacio Lutzky and Miriam Lewin. It revolves around an Argentine Federal Police agent who infiltrates a Jewish community to gather information, which was apparently used to carry out the terrorist attacks against the Israeli embassy in 1992 and the AMIA in 1994.

The series, which debuted on April 29, 2022, stars a cast of Argentine and Uruguayan actors. A month after its premiere, in May 2022 it was renewed for a second season, premiered on October 27, 2023. In November 2022, Yosi, the Regretful Spy won the Silver Condor Awards for Best Drama Series, and Bassani for Best Leading Actor in Drama.

== Premise ==
Yosi, the Regretful Spy follows José Pérez, an intelligence agent of the Argentine Federal Police, who is assigned to infiltrate a Jewish community and gather information about the "Andinia Plan", which according to an antisemitic conspiracy theory sought to establish a Jewish state in Patagonia. Discoveries from the infiltration activity are later used to perpetrate two terrorist attacks on Argentine soil: the bombing on the Israeli embassy in 1992 –in which no culprits were determined–, and on the Argentine Jewish Mutual Association in 1994 –in which several accessories after the event were convicted–.

== Cast and characters ==
=== Main ===
- Natalia Oreiro as Claudia, Yosi's handler, she is a controlling and anti-Semitic agent, who believes in the Andinia Plan and seeks to prevent it from being carried out in Argentina.
- Gustavo Bassani as José Pérez / Yosi, an anti-Semitic police intelligence agent who infiltrates a Jewish community.
- Alejandro Awada as Saúl Menajem, a businessman linked to finance and banking, who traffics arms
- Carla Quevedo as Eli, a committed young Jewish woman who is politically active and has a secret from the past that haunts her
- Minerva Casero as Dafne Menajem, Saúl's daughter and Yosi's romantic interest
- Juan Leyrado as Abraham Glusberg, the Jewish husband of José's mother
- Marco Antonio Caponi as Luis Garrido, José's friend and corrupt intelligence agent who conducts business outside the law.
- Daniel Kuzniecka as Aarón
- Matías Mayer as Víctor Kesselman, leader of the left-wing political group that Yosi joins.
- Mercedes Morán as Mónica Raposo, an incisive retired journalist who helps Yosi.

=== Recurring ===
- Mirella Pascual as Zuni
- César Troncoso as Castaño
- Damián Dreizik as Marcelo
- Carlos Belloso as Kadar
- Enzo Vogrincic as Rivera

=== Guest ===
- Roly Serrano as Minister Aquino
- Julián Ache Pérez Zinola as Jonás Kesselman
- Mercedes Morán as Mónica Raposo
- Danna Liberman as Silvina
- Miguel Di Lemme as Daniel Cruz
- Lucio Hernández as Salerno
- Víctor Wainbuch as Rabbi Straimel
- Fernando Miró as Prosecutor Castillo
- Roberto Suárez as Horacio Gutiérrez
- David Masajnik as Doctor Roitman

== Episodes ==
Series	Episodes	Originally released
1	8	29 April 2022
2	8	27 October 2023

=== Series 1 (2022) ===
No. overall	No. in series	Title	Directed by	Written by	Original release date
1	1	"La Misión"	Daniel Burman and Sebastián Borensztein	Sebastián Borensztein, Natacha Caravia, Andrés Gelós and Daniel Burman	29 April 2022
2	2	"La Memoria"	Daniel Burman and Sebastián Borensztein	Sebastián Borensztein, Natacha Caravia, Andrés Gelós and Daniel Burman	29 April 2022
3	3	"El Hijo"	Daniel Burman and Sebastián Borensztein	Sebastián Borensztein, Natacha Caravia, Andrés Gelós and Daniel Burman	29 April 2022
4	4	"Jeans Nevados"	Daniel Burman and Sebastián Borensztein	Sebastián Borensztein, Natacha Caravia, Andrés Gelós and Daniel Burman	29 April 2022
5	5	"Una alfombra"	Daniel Burman and Sebastián Borensztein	Sebastián Borensztein, Natacha Caravia, Andrés Gelós and Daniel Burman	29 April 2022
6	6	"Casa de muñecas"	Daniel Burman and Sebastián Borensztein	Sebastián Borensztein, Natacha Caravia, Andrés Gelós and Daniel Burman	29 April 2022
7	7	"14:45"	Daniel Burman and Sebastián Borensztein	Sebastián Borensztein, Natacha Caravia, Andrés Gelós and Daniel Burman	29 April 2022
8	8	"El idiota útil"	Daniel Burman and Sebastián Borensztein	Sebastián Borensztein, Natacha Caravia, Andrés Gelós and Daniel Burman	29 April 2022

=== Series 2 (2023) ===
No. overall	No. in series	Title	Directed by	Written by	Original release date
9	1	"El abismo"	Daniel Burman, Sebastián Borensztein and Martín Hodara	Sebastián Borensztein, Natacha Caravia, Andrés Gelós y Daniel Burman	27 October 2023
10	2	"El vuelto"	Daniel Burman and Sebastián Borensztein	Sebastián Borensztein, Natacha Caravia, Andrés Gelós and Daniel Burman	27 October 2023
11	3	"Kadish"	Daniel Burman and Sebastián Borensztein	Sebastián Borensztein, Natacha Caravia, Andrés Gelós and Daniel Burman	27 October 2023
12	4	"Mazel Tov"	Daniel Burman and Sebastián Borensztein	Sebastián Borensztein, Natacha Caravia, Andrés Gelós and Daniel Burman	27 October 2023
13	5	"Silencio"	Daniel Burman and Sebastián Borensztein	Sebastián Borensztein, Natacha Caravia, Andrés Gelós and Daniel Burman	27 October 2023
14	6	"Sion"	Daniel Burman and Sebastián Borensztein	Sebastián Borensztein, Natacha Caravia, Andrés Gelós and Daniel Burman	27 October 2023
15	7	"Traición"	Daniel Burman and Sebastián Borensztein	Sebastián Borensztein, Natacha Caravia, Andrés Gelós and Daniel Burman	27 October 2023
16	8	"Justicia perseguirás"	Daniel Burman and Sebastián Borensztein	Sebastián Borensztein, Natacha Caravia, Andrés Gelós and Daniel Burman	27 October 2023

== Production ==
=== Development ===
In February 2017, it was announced that the Argentine production company Oficina Burman had joined Mediapro to develop several projects to launch internationally, including the adaptation of the book Iosi, el espía arrepentido written by Horacio Lutzky and Miriam Lewin, and which tells the real story of an Argentine policeman who infiltrates a Jewish community. In January 2020, Daniel Burman and Sebastián Borensztein were confirmed as the directors of the series that would be made up of 8 episodes of 40–50 minutes each. On 7 April 2022, it was announced that the series would premiere on the 29th. On 26 May 2022, Amazon Prime Video renewed the show for a second series. In September 2023, the premiere of the second season was announced for October 27.

=== Casting ===
On 17 May 2018, it was announced that Natalia Oreiro, Gustavo Bassani, Marco Antonio Caponi, Alejandro Awada, Juan Leyrado, Matías Mayer and Minerva Casero had joined the show's main cast. In January 2021, it was reported that Carla Quevedo had been cast. At the end of May 2022, it was reported that two Israeli actors Moran Rosenblatt and Itzik Cohen would join the cast of the series.

=== Filming ===
Filming for the first series took place at several locations in Uruguay during 2021. Although the filming took place mainly in Montevideo, several towns in the Canelones Department, such as Progreso, Cerrillos, La Paz and Paso de Carrasco were also included.

== Reception ==
=== Critical response ===
Raúl Kollmann of Página 12 gave a positive review and wrote: "Iosi, el espía arrepentido makes visible what that time was and what the infiltrators of the Federal Police were. But above all because the chapters are exciting, with a huge production that includes beautiful images in the desert, good performances and a rhythm that has nothing to envy to the best series".

== Awards and nominations ==
Year	Award	Category	Recipient(s)	Result	Ref.
2022	Produ Awards	Best Adaptation Series	Iosi, el espía arrepentido	Nominated	
2022	Produ Awards	Best Lead Actress - Drama Series	Natalia Oreiro	Won	
2022	Produ Awards	Best Lead Actor - Drama Series	Gustavo Bassani	Nominated	
2022	Produ Awards	Best Showrunner	Daniel Burman	Won	
2022	Silver Condor Awards	Best Drama Series	Iosi, el espía arrepentido	Won	
2022	Silver Condor Awards	Best Director	Daniel Burman and Sebastián Borensztein	Nominated	
2022	Silver Condor Awards	Best Leading Actor in Drama	Gustavo Bassani	Won	
2022	Silver Condor Awards	Best Supporting Actor	Alejandro Awada	Nominated	
2022	Silver Condor Awards	Best Supporting Actress	Minerva Casero	Nominated	
2022	Silver Condor Awards	Best Supporting Actress	Natalia Oreiro	Nominated	
2022	Silver Condor Awards	Best Male Newcomer	Gustavo Bassani	Nominated	
2022	Silver Condor Awards	Best Female Newcomer	Minerva Casero	Won	
2022	Silver Condor Awards	Best Adapted Screenplay	Sebastián Borensztein, Natacha Caravia, Andrés Gelós, Sergio Dubcovsky and Daniel Burman	Won	
2022	Silver Condor Awards	Best Director of Photography	Rodrigo Pulpeiro	Nominated	
2022	Silver Condor Awards	Best Montage	Alejandro Carrillo Penovi and Alejandro Parysow	Nominated	
2022	Silver Condor Awards	Best Art Direction	Marcelo Salvioli	Nominated	
2022	Silver Condor Awards	Best Costume Design	Carolina Duré and Roberta Pesci	Nominated	
2022	Silver Condor Awards	Best Original Music	Federico Jusid	Won	
2022	Silver Condor Awards	Best Makeup and Hairstyling	Alberto Moccia	Nominated	
2022	Silver Condor Awards	Best Sound Design	Jésica Suárez	Won	
2023	Platino Awards	Best Miniseries or TV series	Iosi, el espía arrepentido	Nominated	
2023	Platino Awards	Best Supporting Actor in a Miniseries or TV series	Alejandro Awada	Won	
2023	Platino Awards	Best Series Creator	Daniel Burman	Nominated	
2023	International Emmy Awards	Best Drama Series	Yosi, the Regretful Spy	Nominated	
2023	International Emmy Awards	Best Actor	Gustavo Bassani	Nominated	
