= Son o se hacen =

Argentine comedy television series

Son o se hacen is a 1997 Argentine comedy television series. It stars Julieta Ortega, Rodrigo De la Serna, Carolina Fal, Walter Quiroz, and Iván González. It was one of the first Argentine television series to explore the topic of sexual diversity.
