= Pablo Catáneo =

- Graduados character
- Pablo Catáneo, played by Luciano Cáceres
- Portrayed by: Luciano Cáceres
- Duration: 2012
In-universe information
- Other names: Bon Jovi
- Occupation: Businessman
- Family: Catáneo
- Siblings: Augusto
- Spouse: María Laura Falsini
- Adoptive children: Martín Catáneo

Pablo Catáneo is a fictional character in the 2012 Argentine telenovela Graduados. He is played by Luciano Cáceres, both as an adult and, in flashbacks, as a teenager.

== Fictional biography ==
Pablo Catáneo attended high school in the 1980s, graduating in 1989. He had sex with a girl in the bathroom during the graduation party, and his girlfriend María Laura Falsini left him when she discovered him. Still, as she got pregnant, her father Clemente Falsini forced them to a shotgun wedding. None of them knew that María Laura was actually pregnant of Andrés Goddzer, another classmate that had a single date with her.

18 years later, a DNA test confirmed that his son, Martín Catáneo, was actually the son of Goddzer. He started a romance with coworker Patricia Longo, ignoring that she was Jimena Benítez, another former classmate.

== Character creation ==
The character was initially proposed to be played by actor Mike Amigorena, who refused it. As a result, Luciano Cáceres played it.

== Awards ==
Luciano Cáceres was nominated for the 2012 tato awards as actor in daily fiction, and 2012 Martín Fierro Awards for lead actor in daily fiction.
