= Marco Antonio Caponi =

Argentine actor

- Born: October 9, 1983 (age 43); Godoy Cruz, Mendoza Province, Argentina
- Occupation: Actor
- Years active: 2006–present
- Height: 1.86 m (6 ft 1 in)
- Spouse: Mónica Antonópulos (m. 2020)
- Partner: Carolina Barbosa (2007-2015)
- Children: 1

Marco Antonio Caponi (born October 9, 1983) is an Argentine actor.

== Biography ==
Marco Antonio Caponi was born in Godoy Cruz, Mendoza Province, Argentina and there he lived the first years of his life, until he moved with his family to Maipú, Mendoza Province, Argentina. Marco Antonio Caponi at the end of high school he decided to study to be a physical education teacher, but then dropped out of the degree. Marco Antonio Caponi worked as a seller of Timeshare, a job that almost made him settle in Chile. In 2004 he decided to move to Buenos Aires, where he lived in a pension in the neighborhood of Once.

== Personal life ==
In 2007, Marco Antonio Caponi began a relationship with actress Carolina Barbosa and since 2009 they lived in the neighborhood of Palermo, Ciudad de Buenos Aires, Argentina. In early 2015 the prensa rosa announced that they had separated.

In 2016, he began a relationship with actress Mónica Antonópulos with whom he has a son named Valentino Caponi Antonópulos who was born in 2018. They got married in 2020 in a civil ceremony, and Antonopoulos confirmed it in March 2021.

== Career ==
Marco Antonio Caponi performed at a casting that Esteban Mellino was performing in Mendoza. He offered him a scholarship to travel to Buenos Aires, Argentina and become an actor. In 2006 he debuted in theater in the City of Buenos Aires, Argentina with the play Loco, posee la fórmula de la felicidad written and directed by Esteban Mellino. In 2009 he participated in the television series Valientes. He also made a special participation in two episodes in the television series Los exitosos Pells. In the year 2010 he was part of the cast of Alguien que me quiera issued by Canal 13. In cinema he participated in 2011 in the Marc Evans movie, Patagonia. In the year 2011 he was part of the cast of Herederos de una venganza. In the year 2012 he was part of the cast of the second season of the telecomedy Los únicos. Also after finalizing his contract with Pol-ka, Marco Antonio Caponi was part of the cast of Graduados. In the year 2013 he was part of the cast of Los Vecinos en Guerra. In the year 2014 he made a special participation in Sres. Papis. In the year 2014 he is invited to the gala n° 32 of the second season of Tu cara me suena (Season 2) where he played Joaquín Sabina. In the year 2014 he stars, replacing Walter Quiroz in the musical comedy Y un día Nico se fue with Tomás Fonzi. From January to March 2015 he stars alongside Inés Estévez and Alberto Ajaka, the work Another lifestyle by Noël Coward in the Teatro Tabarís. In November 2015 Marco Antonio Caponi is part of the work Pequeño circo casero de los hermanos Suárez by Gonzalo Demaría and directed by Luciano Cáceres in the Centro Cultural San Martín. In the year 2018 he plays Sandro de América Adult in the television series Sandro de América.

== Other work ==
In 2011 it was declared "Ciudadano Ilustre de la Ciudad de Maipú, Mendoza Province, Argentina" and in 2015 he was elected as godfather of "Cine Imperial Maipú".

== Filmography ==
=== Theater ===
Year	Title	Director	Theater
2006	Loco, posee la fórmula de la felicidad	Esteban Mellino	
2006	Moco Recargado, el Musical		Teatro Empire
2010-2011	La Anticrista y Las Langostas contra Los Vírgenes Encratitas	Gonzalo Demaría	La Fábrica Centro Cultural
2011-2012	Filosofía de vida	Javier Daulte	Teatro Metropolitan
2014	Y un día Nico se fue	Ricky Pashkus	Teatro 25 de mayo
2014-2015	El acto gratuito	Luciano Cáceres	Teatro El Grito
2015	Other lifestyle	Lía Jelin	Teatro Tabarís
2015	Pequeño circo casero de los hermanos Suárez	Luciano Cáceres	Centro Cultural San Martín
2016	En la soledad de los campos de algodón	Jorge Vitti	Sala Moliere de la Alianza Francesa
2019	Hello Dolly	Arturo Puig	Teatro Ópera
2019-2020	Romance del Baco y la Vaca	Daniel Casablanca	Teatro Timbre 4

=== Television programs ===
Year	Program	Channel	Notes
2008	Bolas de fuego	Argentinísima satelital	Co-Host
2014	Tu cara me suena (Season 2)	Telefe	Competitor

=== Television ===
Year	Title	Character	Channel
2009	Valientes	Federico	Canal 13
2009	Los exitosos Pells		Telefe
2010	Alguien que me quiera	Renzo Peralta	Canal 13
2011-2012	Herederos de una venganza	Lucas Merlot Leiva	Canal 13
2012	Los únicos	Moro Hunter/Moro Funes	Canal 13
2012	Graduados	Augusto Giribone	Telefe
2013-2014	Los Vecinos en Guerra	Fernando Vitelli	Telefe
2014	Sres. Papis	Julián Sandoval	Telefe
2014	Doce casas, Historia de mujeres devotas	Adolfo	TV Pública
2016	La Leona	Rodrigo Cacéres	Telefe
2017-2018	Sandro de América	Sandro de América	Telefe
2018	100 días para enamorarse	Gonzalo	Telefe
2019-2020	El Tigre Verón	Fabio "Fabito" Verón	Canal 13
2020	Separadas	Fausto Valdés	Canal 13
2020	Volver a empezar		Telefe
2022-2023	Yosi, the Regretful Spy	Luis Garrido	Amazon Prime Video
2025	Menem	Silvio Ayala	Amazon Prime Video
2026	Moria	Mario Castiglioni	Netflix

=== Movies ===
Year	Movie	Character	Director
2009	Solo y su compañero	Dan	Andrés Fechtenholz
2011	Patagonia	Diego	Marc Evans
2013	Olvídame	Amber Boyfriend	Aldo Paparella
2015	Pasaje de vida	Pacho	Diego Corsini
2017	Ape lasagna	Journalist	Federico Luis Santos
2017	Gostosas, lindas e sexies	Sebastián	Ernani Nunes
2017	Nobody's Watching	Pablo	Julia Solomonoff
2018	Praça de París	Martím Olmos	Lúcia Murat
2019	Heroic Losers	Hernán	Sebastián Borensztein
2019	¿Yo te gusto?	Nacho	Edgardo González Amer
2022	El gerente	Doctor	Ariel Winograd
2023	Asfixiados	Ramiro	Luciano Podcaminsky
2023	Norma	Roberto	Santiago Giralt
2025	Los renacidos	Oscar	Santiago Esteves

=== Videoclips ===
Year	Artist	Song	Director
2015	Miss Bolivia	Bien Warrior	José Cicala

== Awards and nominations ==
Year	Award	Category	Work	Result
2011	Florencio Sánchez Awards	Male Revelation	Filosofía de vida	Nominated
2012	ACE Awards	Male Revelation	Filosofía de vida	Nominated
2016	Notirey Awards	Best Supporting Actor	La Leona	Nominated
2019	Martín Fierro Awards	Best Leading Actor in Miniseries	Sandro de América	Nominated
