= Juan Pablo Geretto =

Argentine actor (born 1974)

Juan Pablo Geretto (born February 10, 1974) is an Argentine actor.

== Awards ==
=== Nominations ===
- 2013 Martín Fierro Awards
  - Best new actor or actress
