= Verónica Lozano =

Argentine actress and television host

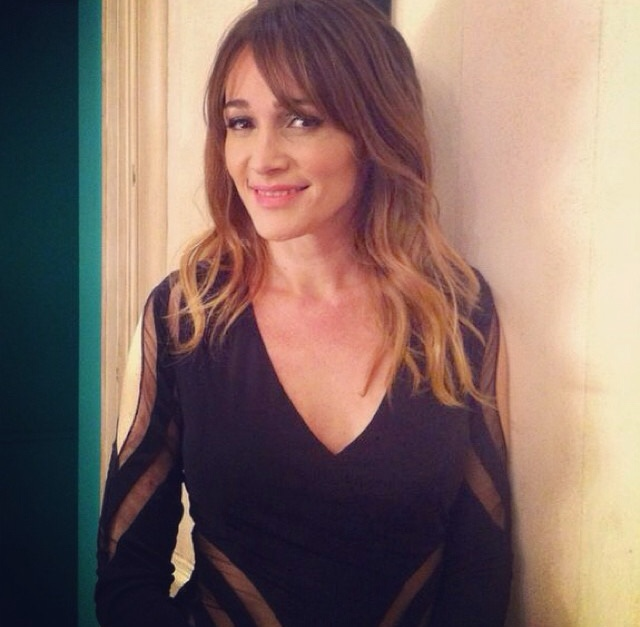
Verónica Lozano

Verónica Lozano (born May 30, 1970, Bahía Blanca, Argentina) is an Argentine actress and TV host.

== Awards ==
- 2013 Tato award as best female TV host
