= Paola Barrientos =

Argentine actress

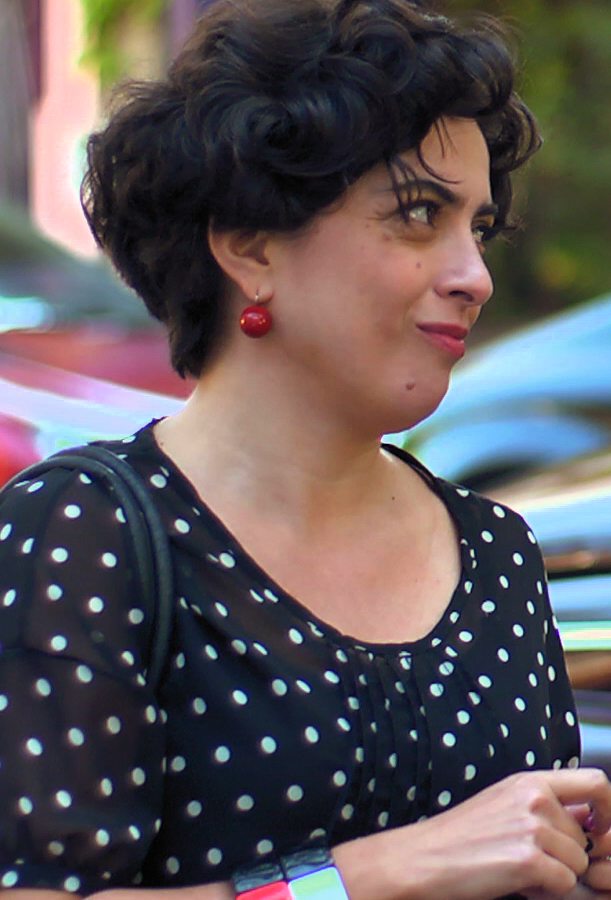
- Barrientos in the argentine sitcom Jostel in 2016
- Born: February 23, 1974 (age 52); San Fernando, Buenos Aires, Argentina
- Education: Escuela Metropolitana de Arte Dramático
- Occupation: Actress
- Years active: 2000–present
- Spouse: Conrado Geiger
- Children: Jano Geiger (b. 2008); Clara Geiger (b. 2013)

Paola Barrientos (born February 23, 1974, in San Fernando, Buenos Aires, Argentina) is an Argentine actress. She worked in theater for several years. She took part in a successful TV spot of Banco Galicia, which allowed her to work in the 2012 telenovela Graduados.

== Biography ==
Paola Barrientos began her acting studies after her graduation from high school. She was initially rejected by the Escuela Metropolitana de Arte Dramático and accepted at a later test.

== Career ==
She began to work in several underground theaters, in plays such as 3-ex, Teo con Julia and Exhibición y desfile, attended by very few people. Elijo la libertad has scripts by Conrado Geiger, Paola's husband. The play Estado de ira allowed her to be hired for several other productions. She became famous taking part in an advertisement for the Galicia bank, a parody of the Titanic film. She played the famous scene at the stern of the ship, making sharky remarks to a husband who failed to be romantic. The advertisement was co-starred by the actor Gonzalo Suárez, and was followed by similar ones. The actress Marilú Marini saw her at the Estado de Ira play and proposed her to work together at Complejo Teatral. The play Las criadas, starred by Barrientos and Marini, is a huge success, with tickets sold for weeks in advance. Estado de ira allowed her as well to be included in the cast of Graduados. Actress Andrea Pietra saw the play and advised her friend Nancy Dupláa, lead actress of the telenovela, to hire her for the role of the best friend of Dupláa's character, Victoria Lauría. Although Paola Barrientos made her first major work in television at the age of 38, Nancy Dupláa praised her professionalism and her adaption to the medium. As a result of the success of her character, Paola Barrientos was included in the front page of several Argentine magazines in 2012. She ended working in the Galicia advertisements in 2018, after 9 years. It was rumored that she was replaced because of her political ideas, close to Kirchnerism, but she clarified that she resigned simply because she considered that she had worked enough in those ads.

== Filmography ==
=== Television ===
Year	Title	Character	Channel
2000	Chabonas		América TV
2005	Casados con Hijos	Moni's friend/Dolores Parreiro	Telefe
2006	Hechizada		Telefe
2007	Lalola		América TV
2010	Para vestir santos	Carolina	Canal 13
2010-2011	Contra las cuerdas	Romina	TV Pública
2012	Graduados	María Victoria "Vicky" Lauria	Telefe
2012	El hombre de tu vida	Nora	Telefe
2013	Historias de corazón	Sofía	Telefe
2014-2015	Viudas e hijos del Rock & Roll	Miranda Bettini de Arostegui	Telefe
2016	Jostel		TV Pública
2016	Educando a Nina	María Victoria "Vicky" Lauria	Telefe
2016	Según Roxi	Andrea Rodríguez	TV Pública
2018	100 días para enamorarse	Bettina	Telefe
2018-2019	El jardín de bronce		HBO
2020	Volver a empezar		Telefe

=== Movies ===
Year	Movie	Character	Director
2014	Ciencias naturales	Jimena	Matías Lucchesi
2015	Papeles en el viento		Juan Taratuto
2017	The Heavy Hand of the Law	Gloria Soriano	Fernán Mirás
2018	Amor Urgente		Diego Lublinsky
2019	La afinadora de árboles	Clara	Natalia Smirnoff
2020	Crímenes de familia	Psicóloga	Sebastián Schindel
2023	Casi muerta	Paula	Fernán Mirás

=== Theater ===
Title	Director
Las criadas	Ciro Zorzoli
Un tranvía llamado deseo	Daniel Veronesse
Exhibición y desfile	Ciro Zorzoli
Mujeres de carne podrida	José María Muscari
Saña	Paola Barrientos
6. Cuentos putos, no cometerás actos impuros	Alejandro López
Uno en secreto	Ciro Zorzoli
Pornografía emocional	Matías Méndez and José María Muscari
Marchita como el día	José María Muscari
Olivo	Monina Bonelli
Elijo la soledad	Paola Barrientos
Teatro para pájaros	Daniel Veronese
El niño en cuestión	Ciro Zorzoli
Crónicas	Xavier Durringer
Teo con Julia	Fernanda Orazi and Diego Velázquez
Belleza cruda	Bernardo Cappa and José María Muscari
Grasa	José María Muscari
3EX - pieza íntima para teatro	Moro Anghileri and Gustavo Tarrío
Tarascones	Ciro Zorzoli

== Awards and nomination ==
Year	Award	Category	Work	Result
2010	Martín Fierro Awards	Revelation Artist	Contra las cuerdas	Nominated
2012	Martín Fierro Awards	Supporting Actress	Graduados	Winner
2012	Tato Awards	Supporting Actress in Daily Fiction	Graduados	Winner
2016	Silver Condor Awards	Best Female Revelation	Ciencias naturales	Winner
