= Andy Kusnetzoff =

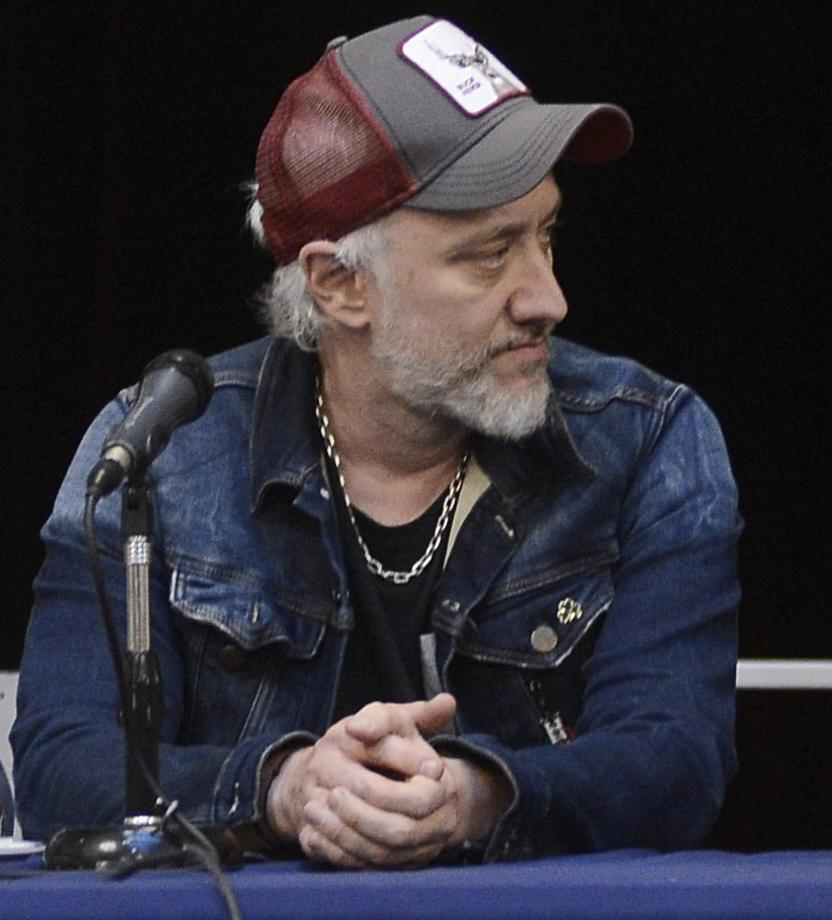

Andres "Andy" Kusnetzoff (born November 17, 1970) is an Argentine journalist, TV host and producer. He worked in TV shows as "Turno Tarde" and "El Rayo", but became famous with his role as an informal journalist in Caiga Quien Caiga. He worked from 1995 to 1999. Since then, he was the host of "Maldito Lunes" in Telefe (2000), "El bar" (2001) and "Escalera a la fama" (2003). In 2004 he hosted "somos como somos", renamed to "Argentinos por su nombre" in 2005.

He was considered as a possible main actor of the 2012 comedy Graduados, but the role was finally taken by Daniel Hendler. However, he took part in it, in a guest appearance.

He got the 1998 Martín Fierro Award as journalist host, and the 2005 Clarín Award for his radio show "Perros de la calle".
