= Gastón Soffritti =

Argentine actor (born 1991)

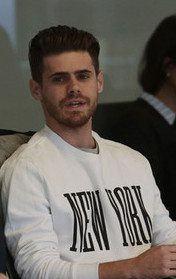
- Born: Gastón Nicolás Soffritti; 13 December 1991 (age 34); Buenos Aires, Argentina
- Occupation: Actor
- Years active: 2001-present
- Partner: Candelaria Molfese (2022-2024)

Gastón Nicolás Soffritti (born 13 December 1991) is an Argentine actor. He debuted as an actor at the age of nine and has appeared in the series Floricienta, Patito Feo, Sueña Conmigo and Graduados.

== Biography ==
Soffritti's first work was in the telenovela Yago, pasión Morena. He was then aged nine and was selected from 1,500 children seeking to join the cast. He played the cousin of Facundo Arana's character. Beset with acting commitments, he received his education at five different schools.

He became famous as the lead male actor of the teen drama Patito Feo. The successful telenovela lasted for two seasons.

In an attempt to escape the teen drama genre, Soffritti worked in Graduados. He received the proposal while making a short production for América 2. To design his character he had interviews with all the other actors who played roles linked with it; this included most of the cast because his character was a nexus between the two families of the plot, the firm and the school. He praised the actress Nancy Dupláa, who played his mother in the fiction.

In 2013, it was reported that he would be a member of the cast of Vecinos en guerra, a telenovela produced by Underground, along Mike Amigorena and Mónica Antonopulos. His character in the fiction was to be a young thief, a contrast to the character he played in Graduados.

Soffritti is also a guitar and drum player. He has a band named Quimera 9.

== Television series ==
Year	Title	Role	Television	Notes
2001-2002	Yago, pasión Morena	Mateo Sirenio	Telefe	Cast Member
2003	Rincón de Luz	Guillermo	América TV	
2005	Floricienta	Thiago	Canal 13	
2006	Chiquititas Sin Fin	Federico "Pulgas" Romero	Telefe	
2007-2008	Patito Feo	Matías Beltrán	Canal 13	Youth protagonist
2009	Un paradiso per due	Cesare	Canale 5	Special performance
2010-2011	Sueña Conmigo	Iván Quintero	Nickelodeon	
2011	Historias de la primera vez	Joaquín Cavenaghi	América TV	Special performance
2012	Graduados	Martín Cataneo/Goddzer	Telefe	Youth protagonist
2013	Vecinos en guerra	Lucas Galetto/Lucas Mayorga	Telefe	Youth protagonist
2014	La celebración	Julio	Telefe	Special performance
2014	El otro, no todo es lo que ves	Jony	TV Pública	
2014-2015	Noche y día	Benjamín Liberman	Canal 13	Main cast
2015	Conflictos modernos	Nicolás	Canal 9	Special performance
2016-2017	Por amarte así	Manuel Correa	Telefe	Protagonist
2018	Simona	Romeo Funes Guerrico	Canal 13	Protagonist
2018	Sandro de América	Lito	Telefe	Special performance

Realities shows
Year	Title	Role	Notes
2013	Celebrity Splash	Contestant	Eliminated in Round 1 – Part 2
2017	Bailando 2017	Contestant with Agustina Agazzani	Abandoned
2021	MasterChef Celebrity Argentina 3	Contestant	3rd eliminated

== Movies ==
Year	Title	Role	Director	Notes
2004	Los Increíbles	Dash Parr (voice)		Argentine version
2009	Un paradiso per due	Cesare	Pier Belloni	
2015	El desafío	Hernán	Juan Manuel Rampoldi	
2025	Homo Argentum	Lucas	Gastón Duprat and Mariano Cohn	

== Theater ==
Year	Title	Role	Theater
2002	Pequeños fantasmas	Rodrigo	
2004	Rincón de luz	Guillermo	Gran Rex
2006-2007	Chiquititas sin fin	Federico 'Pulgas' Romero	Gran Rex
2007-2008	Patito feo en el teatro	Matiás Beltrán	
2009	Patito feo: El show más lindo	Matiás Beltrán	
2011	Sueña conmigo en concierto	Iván Quinteros	
2012-2013	Los Grimaldi	Nicolás	
2015	Sexo con extraños	Ethan	
2018	Simona	Romeo	
