= Juan Leyrado =

Argentine actor

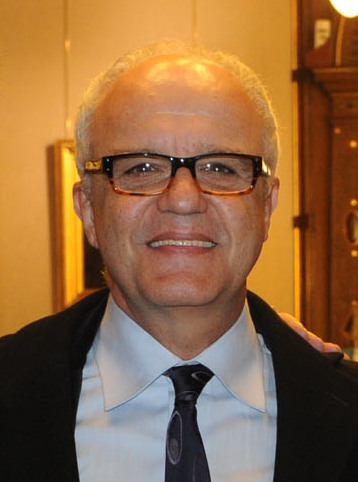
- Born: Juan Carlos Leyrado Ravecca; August 18, 1951 (age 74); Barracas, Buenos Aires, Argentina
- Occupation: Actor
- Years active: 1978–present
- Height: 1.75 m (5 ft 9 in)

Juan Carlos Leyrado Ravecca (born August 18, 1951) is an Argentine actor. He took part in the incredibly successful 2012 Argentine telenovela Graduados.

== Works ==
=== Television ===
- Yosi, the Regretful Spy
- Educando a Nina
- El maestro
- Un gallo para esculapio
- La Caida
- Aliados
- Graduados
- El hombre de tu vida
- Los cuentos de Fontanarrosa
- Mujeres asesinas
- Gladiadores de Pompeya
- Tiempo final
- Los machos de América
- Tres padres solteros
- Maridos a domicilio
- Gasoleros
- La hermana mayor
- Alta comedia
- Atreverse
- Dos vidas y un destino
- Tato Bores
- Situación límite
- El trópico del cangrejo
- Amores
- Desde adentro
- Plomera de mi barrio
- Mía solo mía
- Con pecado concebidas
- Tres minas infieles
- Nosotros y los miedos
- Matrimonios y algo más
- Compromisos
- Galería

=== Film ===
- Motivos para no enamorarse (2008)
- Matar a Videla (2007)
- Cómplices del silencio (2007)
- Maradona, la mano de Dios (2007)
- Iluminados por el fuego (2005)
- Paco Urondo, la palabra justa (2004)
- Cruz de sal (2003)
- El día que me amen (2003)
- Chiquititas: Rincón de luz (2001)
- Antigua vida mía (2001)
- Mar de amores (1998)
- Despabílate amor (1996)
- Picado fino (1993)
- Vivir mata (1991)
- Lo que vendrá (1988)
- Memorias y olvidos (1987)
- Revancha de un amigo (1987)
- Tacos altos (1985)
- Los insomnes (1984)
- Asesinato en el Senado de la Nación (1984)
- Atrapadas (1984)
- Los chicos de la guerra (1984)
- Camila (1984)
- Los enemigos (1983)
- La casa de las siete tumbas (1982)
- Subí que te llevo (1980)
- Desde el abismo (1980)

=== Theater ===
- Baraka
- Ella en mi cabeza
- Cabaret Bijou
- Cyrano de Bergerac
- Velázquez
- Nacida Ayer
- Hombres
- Ciclo Nueva Armonía
- Los Lobos
- Los Mosqueteros
- Rumores
- Camino Negro
- Luv
- La señorita de Tacna
- El burlador de Sevilla
- Feria del miedo, del amor y de la guerra
- Tres hermanas
- Un tranvía llamado deseo
- Aquí no podemos hacerlo
- Madre Coraje
- Bent
- Israfel
- Nuestro pueblo
- Atendiendo al Sr Sloane
- Dios Mio

== Awards ==
=== Nominations ===
- 2013 Martín Fierro Awards
  - Best actor of miniseries
