= Juan Gil Navarro =

Argentine actor (born 1973)

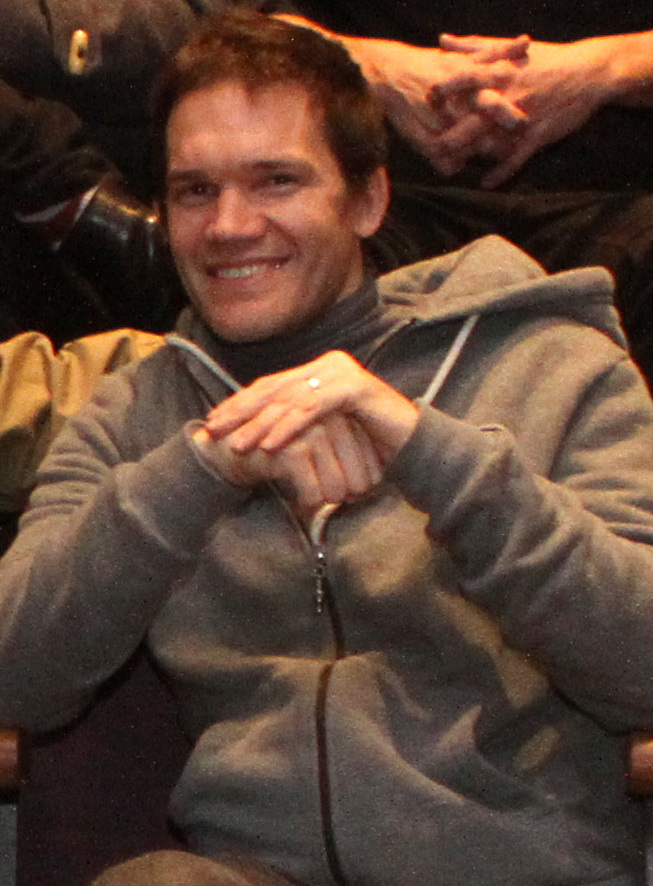
- Born: Juan Manuel Gil Navarro; August 15, 1973 (age 53); Buenos Aires, Argentina
- Education: Colegio Rudolf Steiner Schule
- Occupations: Actor, Screenwriter, Television Producer and Film Director
- Years active: 1996-present
- Height: 1.78 m (5 ft 10 in)
- Spouses: Malena Toia (m. 1999; div. 2003) Natalia Litvack (m. 2006; div. 2018)
- Parent(s): Manuel Gil and Alejandra Navarro

Juan Manuel Gil Navarro (born August 15, 1973) is an Argentine actor, screenwriter, television producer and film director.

== Biography ==
Juan Gil Navarro is the son of Manuel Gil, a journalist and Alejandra Navarro, a secretary. He studied at the German school Rudolf Steiner Schule in Florida, Vicente López Partido, Buenos Aires, Argentina.

== Personal life ==
In the year 1999, Juan Gil Navarro married Malena Toia in a religious ceremony. The couple divorced in the year 2003. On August 3, 2006, he married Natalia Litvack in a civil ceremony. The couple divorced in the year 2018.

== Filmography ==
=== Television ===
Year	Title	Character	Channel
1996	Montaña rusa, otra vuelta	Micky	Canal 13
1997	De corazón	Fernando	Canal 13
1998	Gasoleros	Wolfrang	Canal 13
1999	Verano del '98	León	Telefe
2000	Primicias	Rodrigo	Canal 13
2000	Calientes	Sebastián	Canal 13
2001	El sodero de mi vida	Fidel	Canal 13
2001	Culpables	Martino	Canal 13
2001	Código negro	Juan Carlos Rizzo	TV Pública
2002	1000 millones	Ariel	Canal 13
2003	Soy gitano	Segundo Soto	Canal 13
2004	Floricienta	Federico Fritzenwalden	Canal 13
2004-2005	Historias de sexo de gente común	Diego	Telefe
2005	Hombres de honor	Rocco Onoratto/Patter Nostra	Canal 13
2006	Al límite		Telefe
2007-2008	Lalola	Ramiro "Lalo" Padilla/Daniel Calori	América TV
2008	Vidas robadas	Nicolás Duarte	Telefe
2010	Secretos de amor	Ignacio	Telefe
2010	Cain and Abel	Fernando Soler/Guillermo Hüs	Telefe
2011	Dance!	Ricardo Gutiérrez	Canal 10
2011	Decisiones de vida	Pablo	Canal 9
2011	Maltratadas	Lucas Matheu	América TV
2012	Perfidia	Manuel Gutiérrez Dillon	TV Pública
2012	Graduados	Guillermo "Willy" Almada	Telefe
2012	La Dueña	Federico Lacroix	Telefe
2012-2013	Mi amor, mi amor	Juan Dalton	Telefe
2013	Los Vecinos en Guerra	Mariano Sánchez Ginastera	Telefe
2015-2016	La casa del mar	Daniel Johnson	OnDirecTV
2016	La Leona	Gabriel Miller Liberman	Telefe
2017	La fragilidad de los cuerpos	Federico	Canal 13
2018	100 días para enamorarse	Javier Fernández Prieto	Telefe
2018	Rizhoma Hotel	Maximiliano	Telefe
2020	Submersos	Fara	Paramount Network

=== Theater ===
Year	Title	Character	Director	Theater
1997	Las visiones de Simón Marchard	Ángel		
1998	Ofelia y la pureza			
1999	Las alegres mujeres de Shakespeare			
2000	Comedieta			
2000	Canciones maliciosas			
2002	Cesárea			
2002	El violinista en el tejado	Perchik		
2003	La Granada			
2004	Floricienta en el Teatro	Federico Fritzenwalden	Cris Morena	Teatro Gran Rex
2005	Tango perdido			
2006	La discreta enamorada			
2006	Floricienta, el tour de los sueños	Federico Fritzenwalden	Cris Morena	
2007	El zoo de Cristal	Tom		
2007	Floricienta, el tour de los sueños en México	Federico Fritzenwalden	Cris Morena	
2008	Una Cierta Piedad	Ben		
2008	Algo en común	Arturo		
2009	Rey Lear	Edmund		
2012	Las brujas de Salem	John Proctor		
2013	Cock	Juan		
2014	Priscilla, La Reina del Desierto	Adams-Felicia		
2016	Deseo	Manuel		
2016-2017	Shakespeare Todos y Ninguno			Teatro Unipersonal
2017-2018	Eva Perón y El homosexual o la dificultad de expresarse	Sra. Simpson		

=== Movies ===
Year	Movie	Character	Director
2003	El día que me amen	Fernando	Daniel Barone
2011	La Inocencia de la Araña	Manuel Colman	Sebastián Caulier
2012	2/11: Día de los muertos	Santiago	Ezio Massa
2018	El azote del diablo		Pablo Bustos Sack

== Discography ==
=== Soundtrack albums ===
- 2004 — Floricienta
- 2007 — Floricienta

== Awards and nominations ==
Year	Award	Category	Work	Result
2000	Florencio Sánchez Awards	Best Supporting Actor	Canciones maliciosas	Winner
2003	ACE Awards	Supporting Actor	La Granada	Nominated
2005	Martín Fierro Awards	Novel Lead Actor	Hombres de honor	Nominated
2008	Clarín Awards	Novel Lead Actor	Vidas robadas	Nominated
2008	Florencio Sánchez Awards	Best Supporting Actor	Una Cierta Piedad	Winner
2009	Martín Fierro Awards	Novel Lead Actor	Vidas robadas	Nominated
2013	Martín Fierro Awards	Novel Lead Actor	Mi amor, mi amor	Nominated
2014	Hugo Awards	Best Lead Actor in a Musical Comedy	Priscilla la reina del desierto	Nominated
2014	ACE Awards	Best Lead Actor in a Musical Comedy	Priscilla la reina del desierto	Nominated
2019	Martín Fierro Awards	Novel Supporting Actor	100 días para enamorarse	Nominated
