= Mike Amigorena =

Argentine actor

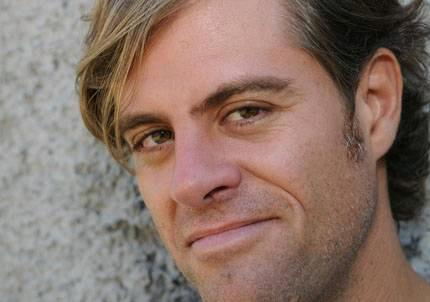
- Mike Amigorena in 2007
- Born: Ricardo Luis Amigorena; May 30, 1972 (age 53); Maipú, Mendoza Province, Argentina
- Other names: Mike Amigorena
- Occupation: Actor
- Years active: 1992-present
- Partner(s): Mónica Antonópulos (2013-2015); Sofía Vitola (2018-present)
- Children: Miel Amigorena Vitola (b. February 4, 2020)

Ricardo Luis Amigorena (born May 30, 1972 in Maipú, Mendoza Province, Argentina), better known as Mike Amigorena is an Argentine actor.

== Biography ==
He was born in Maipú, Mendoza Province to a Basque Argentine father and an Italian Argentine mother. Amigorena was especially restless as an adolescent and was expelled from a number of secondary schools. He left Maipú for Buenos Aires in search of fame in 1992, and initially struggled in a variety of menial jobs, living hand-to-mouth in a tenement for a number of years.

== Personal life ==
Since May 2018 he is in a relationship with the singer Sofía Vitola. On February 4, 2020 they became parents for the first time of a girl whom they called Miel Amigorena Vitola.

== Career ==
He was eventually discovered by a modeling agency and in 1992, was given a small role in leading local comic Guillermo Francella's sitcom, La familia Benvenuto. He later appeared in the popular teen drama, Montaña rusa ("Rollercoaster"), and in the mid-1990s, enrolled in a theatre school, mentored first by Santiago Doria, and later, Alfredo Zemma, of the Argentine Actors' Association. He first appeared in Buenos Aires' vibrant theatre scene in 1995 and became a prolific stage actor, notably in a 1998 local production of German playwright Frank Wedekind's Spring Awakening, and in a compressed Shakespeare production from 2004 to 2006, which earned him Argentine ACE and Clarín Awards. He was given his first film role by directors Florencia Di Baja and Germán Drexler, as the leading man in their comedy, Tus ojos brillaban (Bright Eyes), in 2004, and was reunited with Francella in 2005 in his top-rated sitcom, Casados con hijos ("Married with Children"). Two comedy film roles, in Gabriel Condrón's Un peso, un dólar (2006) and as the lead in Tatiana Merenuk's romantic comedy, Yo soy sola (I'm Alone, 2008), were followed by his role as Martín Pells in the primetime Telefe sitcom, Los exitosos Pells, which premiered in May 2008 and for which he received a Martín Fierro Award. Amigorena was among the Argentine actors asked to appear in Francis Ford Coppola's production set in Buenos Aires, Tetro (2009). He had a band called "Ambulancia" with his friends and he was the lead vocalist in his indie rock, they did covers and their own songs. In 2015 the band dissolved.

== Filmography ==
=== Television ===
Year	Title	Character	Channel	Notes
1992-1993	Los Benvenuto	Ramiro Benvenuto	Telefe	
1994	Montaña rusa	Juan Victorino	Canal 13	
1995	Montaña rusa, otra vuelta	Juan Victorino	Canal 13	
1997	Naranja y media	José	Telefe	
1998	Como pan caliente	Nicolás	Canal 13	
1998	Ricos y Famosos	Mauricio	Canal 9	
1998-1999	Muñeca brava	Tomás	Telefe	
1999	Gasoleros	Bruno	Canal 13	
2000-2001	Los buscas de siempre	Tito	Canal 9	
2000-2002	Tiempo final	Mariano/Debrasse/Antonio	Telefe	
2002	Franco Buenaventura, el profe	Marcos	Telefe	
2003	Rebelde Way	Juan Manuel	América TV	
2003	Malandras	"El Toni" Segovia	Canal 9	
2004	La niñera	Leonel	Telefe	
2005	Una familia especial	Helios Sneider	Canal 13	
2005	Sin código	Tomás Coronado	Canal 13	
2005	Casados con Hijos	Juan Ariel Snaola	Telefe	
2005	¿Quién es el jefe?	Fredy	Telefe	
2006-2007	Sos mi vida	Rolando Martínez	Canal 13	
2007	El Capo	Facundo	Telefe	
2008-2009	Los exitosos Pells	Martín Pells/Gonzalo Echagüe	Telefe	
2010	Los exitosos Pérez	Adrián Bruar	Televisa	
2010	Lo que el tiempo nos dejó	Alfredo Astiz	Telefe	"Ep: La caza del ángel"
2011	El pacto	Horacio Murgan	América TV	
2012	El hombre de tu vida	Daniel	Telefe	
2013	Historia clínica	Luis Sandrini/José de San Martín	Telefe	
2013-2014	Los Vecinos en Guerra	Alejo "Alex" López/Alejo "Alex" Mayorga	Telefe	
2014	Las 13 esposas de Wilson Fernández	Nicandro	TV Pública	
2014	Viento Sur		América TV	"Ep 3: Los Rapiña"
2014-2015	Guapas	Federico Müller	Canal 13	
2017	Quiero vivir a tu lado	Tomás Justo	Canal 13	
2019	Otros pecados	Santiago	Canal 13	"Ep 5: Rojo"

=== Theater ===
Year	Title
1995	Pim pam pum
1997	Los ojos llenos de amor
1997	Glotony
1998	Despertar de primavera
1999	Payasos imperiales
2000	Verídicamente opaco
2000	El testigo
2001	Colón agarra viaje a toda costa
2002	Los sonetos de Shakespeare
2002-2003	Todos tenemos problemas sexuales
2004	Shakespeare comprimido
2006-2007	El niño argentino
2010	La noche antes de los bosques
2011	Hamlet
2019	Cabaret the musical

=== Movies ===
Year	Movie	Character	Director
2000	Pescado crudo		Milagros Roque Pitt and Alejandro Montiel
2001	Vida en Marte		Néstor Frenkel
2002	Camafildenois		Francisco Nocito
2003	Tus ojos brillaban		Silvio Fischbein
2005	1 peso, 1 dólar	El Langa	Gabriel Condron
2006	Yo soy sola	Nacho	Tatiana Mereñuk
2007	Horizontal - vertical		Nicolás Tuozzo
2008	Tetro	Abelardo	Francis Ford Coppola
2010	Plumiferos	Fredy (voice)	Daniel De Felippo
2010	Toy Story 3	Ken (voice)	Lee Unkrich
2010	Miss Tacuarembó	Cristo	Martín Sastre
2013	Lectura según Justino		Arnaldo André
2016	All Men Are the Same	Juan Luis	Manuel Gómez Pereira
2016	Primavera		Santiago Giralt
2017	Mario on tour	Mario	Pablo Stigliani
2017	No llores por mí, Inglaterra	General Beresford	Néstor Montalbano
2024	Jaque mate (Checkmate)	Rey	

== Awards ==
Year	Award	Category	Program	Result
2004	ACE Awards	Male Revelation	Shakespeare comprimido	Winner
2005	Premios Martín Fierro	Revelation	Una familia especial	Nominated
2006	CCC Spectator School Awards	Best Male Performance	El niño argentino	Winner
2006	World Best Theater Awards	Best Male Performance	El niño argentino	Winner
2006	ACE Awards	Male Performance	El niño argentino	Nominated
2008	Premios Martín Fierro	Actor Protagonist of Comedy	Los exitosos Pells	Winner
2009	Premios Martín Fierro	Actor Protagonist of Comedy	Los exitosos Pells	Nominated
2010	ACE Awards	Best Actor	La noche antes de los bosques	Winner
2011	Konex Foundation	Television Actor	Trayectoria última década	Winner
2013	Premios Martín Fierro	Best Actor of Daily Comedy	Los vecinos en guerra	Nominated
