= Violeta Urtizberea =

Argentine actress

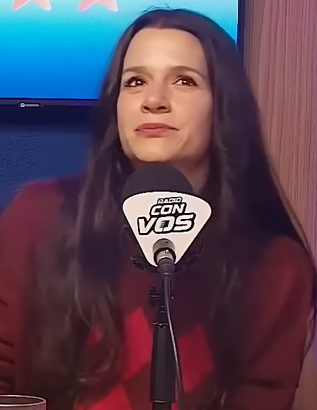
- Violeta Urtizberea in 2026
- Born: February 19, 1985 (age 41); Buenos Aires, Argentina
- Occupation: Actress
- Years active: 1995–present
- Partner: Juan Ingaramo (2015–present)
- Children: Lila Ingaramo Urtizberea (b. September 20, 2019)
- Parent(s): Mex Urtizberea and Gabriela Ferreyra

Violeta Urtizberea (February 19, 1985) is an Argentine actress. She worked once again with her father in the 2012 telenovela Graduados.

== Biography ==
She is the granddaughter of the journalist Raúl Urtizberea, daughter of the actor Mex Urtizberea and niece of the actor Gonzalo Urtizberea.

== Career ==
She began working on Magazine for Fai on the channel Telefe, along with her father Mex Urtizberea. She made other works with him, and then began her own career. She worked once again with her father in the 2012 telenovela Graduados.

== Personal life ==
Since 2015, she has been in a relationship with the singer Juan Ingaramo. On September 20, 2019, she gave birth to the couple's first child, a girl, in the Clínica Suizo Argentina whom they called Lila Ingaramo Urtizberea. She is a close friend of the actress Julieta Zylberberg.

== Televisión ==
Year	Title	Character	Channel
1995-1996	Magazine For Fai		Cablin
1998-1999	For Fai Deportivo		TyC Sports
1999	For Fai Presidente		America TV
1999	Gasoleros	Milena	Canal 13
1999	Hola Susana		Telefe
2004	Locas de amor	Luz Teglia	Canal 13
2005	Conflictos en red		Telefe
2005	¿Quién es el jefe?		Telefe
2006	Amo de casa	Karina	Canal 9
2006	Soy tu fan	Agustina	Canal 9
2006	Mujeres asesinas	Leticia, codiciosa	Canal 13
2007-2008	Lalola	Julia	America TV
2009	Enseñame a vivir	Asaí/Clodine Fernández Salguero	Canal 13
2010	Combinaciones	Clara	Internet
2011	Los únicos	Mara	Canal 13
2011	Maltratadas	Ep: “Eterno retornó	America TV
2011	El pacto	Sol García Fabre	America TV
2012	Graduados	Gabriela Goddzer	Telefe
2014	El Secreto de los Rossi	Paula Rossi	TV Pública
2014-2015	Viudas e hijos del Rock & Roll	Lourdes Sánchez Elías de Arostegui	Telefe
2015	Conflictos modernos	Patricia	Canal 9
2016	Educando a Nina	Graciela “La Negra”	Telefe
2016	Las palomas y las bombas		TV Pública
2016	La última hora		TV Pública
2017	El galán de Venecia	Turquesa	UNTREF
2017-2018	Las Estrellas (telenovela)	Florencia Estrella	El Trece
2018	Rizhoma Hotel	Rosario	Telefe
2019	Otros pecados		El Trece
2019	Una razón para vivir		Telefe
2020	Tu Vieja en Tanga		
2021	La 1-518, somos uno	Charo Vidal	El Trece

== Movies ==
Year	Movie	Character	Director
2007	Una novia errante	Tati	Ana Katz
2008	Un novio para mi mujer	Paola	Juan Taratuto
2010	Francia	Maestra	Israel Adrián Caetano
2012	No te enamores de mí		
2014	Las insoladas	Vicky	Gustavo Taretto
2015	Volley	Manuela	Martín Piroyansky
2018	El diablo blanco	Camila	Ignacio Rogers
2023	Casi muerta	Julieta	Fernán Mirás

== Theater ==
Year	Title	Character	Director
2000	Cenicienta, la historia continúa		
	Lucro Cesante		Ana Katz
	Reproches constantes		Santiago Gobernori
	Miami		Cynthia Edul
2011	Ocho mujeres		
2012	Dónde van los corazones rotos		Cynthia Edul
2012	Isósceles		Mariana Chaud
2014	Las lágrimas		Mariano Tenconi Blanco
2016	Despierto		Ignacio Sánchez Mestre
2017	Despierto		Ignacio Sánchez Mestre
