= Mirta Busnelli =

Argentine actress (born 1946)

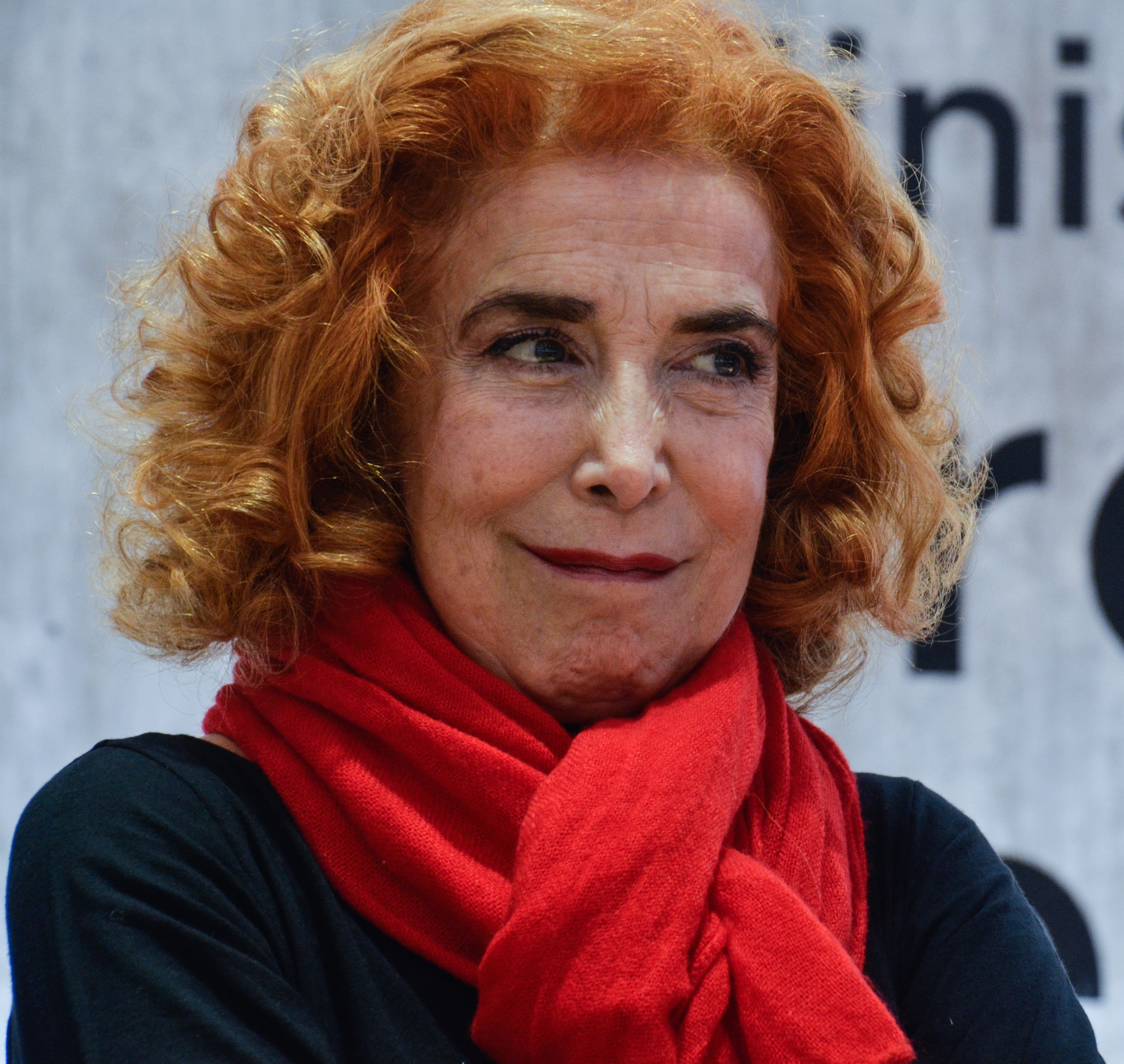
- Busnelli in 2017
- Born: January 13, 1946 (age 80); Buenos Aires, Argentina
- Occupation: Actress
- Children: At least 1

Mirta Busnelli (born January 13, 1946) is an Argentine actress.

== Awards ==
=== Nominations ===
- 2013 Martín Fierro Awards
  - Best secondary actress (for Los vecinos en guerra)
