= Julieta Ortega =

Argentine actress (born 1972)

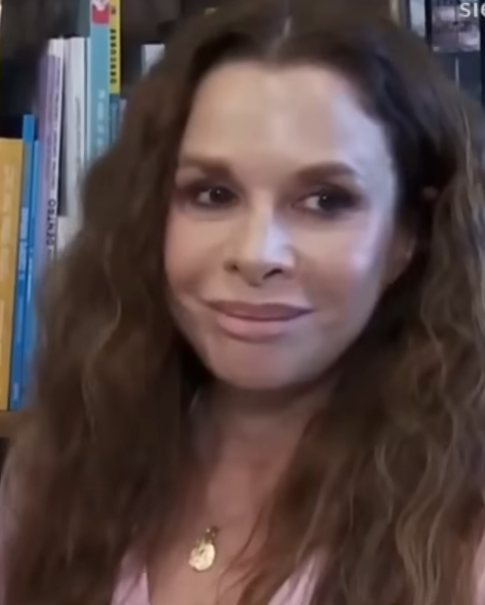
- Born: 6 October 1972 (age 53); Buenos Aires, Argentina
- Occupation: Actress
- Years active: 1990–present
- Spouse: Iván Noble (m. 2002–2009)
- Partner: Camilo Vaca Narvaja (2019–present)
- Children: 1
- Parents: Palito Ortega (father); Evangelina Salazar (mother)
- Relatives: Sebastián Ortega (brother); Emanuel Ortega (brother); Luis Ortega (brother); Luciana Salazar (cousin)

Julieta Ortega (born 6 October 1972) is an Argentine actress. She is the daughter of Palito Ortega and Evangelina Salazar and sister of Martín Ortega, Sebastián Ortega, Emanuel Ortega and Luis Ortega.

== Biography ==
Palito Ortega and Evangelina Salazar got married in 1967. The wedding was broadcast on television. They had six children, Martín Ortega Salazar, Julieta Ortega, Sebastián Ortega, Emanuel Ortega, Luis Ortega and Rosario Ortega Salazar. In 1985 the entire family moved to Miami, Florida to return only when Palito ran for governor of Tucumán. In 1981, when she was only 9 years old, she went to the concert that the singer Frank Sinatra did in Buenos Aires, Argentina, invited by Palito, to whom she herself gave a bouquet of roses as thanks.

== Personal life ==
She was married to the musician Iván Noble, ex Caballeros de la Quema, with whom she had a son named Benito Noble Ortega.

== Career ==
Her acting career began in Argentina having studied theater at the Actors Studio of Los Angeles, California. On television he played bold roles a lesbian along with Carolina Fal in Son o se hacen, a nurse from a psychiatric hospital in Sol negro, a prostitute in Disputas and the niece of Emilio Uriarte, in Los Roldán. In theater she was part of the cast of El cartero with texts based on the novel by Antonio Skármeta. In cinema, she starred La maestra normal, Pequeños milagros from Eliseo Subiela, 24 horas (Algo está por explotar) and participated in Animalada. In the year 2012, she is part of the cast of the successful telecomedy Graduados. In 2014 she is part of the cast of Viudas e hijos del Rock & Roll.

In 2024, Ortega starred in La Fuerza del Cariño, a theatrical adaptation of the Oscar-winning film Terms of Endearment.

== Filmography ==
=== Television ===
| Year | Title | Character | Channel |
|---|---|---|---|
| 1990 | Amándote II | July | Telefe |
| 1991 | Amigos son los amigos | Alejandra | Telefe |
| 1994 | Alta comedia | | Canal 9 |
| 1995 | La hermana mayor | Carolina | Canal 13 |
| 1996 | Sueltos | | Canal 13 |
| 1996 | Verdad consecuencia | Nora | Canal 13 |
| 1997-1998 | Son o se hacen? | Abril | Canal 9 |
| 1998 | Los especiales de Doria | | Canal 13 |
| 1999 | Drácula | Luz | América TV |
| 1999-2000 | Buenos vecinos | Poli | Telefe |
| 2000 | Vulnerables | Rocío | Canal 13 |
| 2001 | El Hacker 2001 | María | Telefe |
| 2001 | 22, el loco | Natalia | Canal 13 |
| 2002 | Infieles | Maid | Telefe |
| 2002 | Tiempo final | | Telefe |
| 2003 | Disputas | Gloria | Telefe |
| 2003 | Sol negro | Lara | América TV |
| 2004 | Los Roldán | Luciana | Telefe |
| 2005 | Conflictos en red | | Telefe |
| 2005 | Doble vida | | América TV |
| 2006 | El tiempo no para | Julia Garayalde | Canal 9 |
| 2008 | Aquí no hay quien viva | Lucía Panebianco | Telefe |
| 2008 | Mujeres asesinas | | Canal 13 |
| 2010 | Lo que el tiempo nos dejó | | Telefe |
| 2011 | Un año para Recordar | Isabel Rojas/Isabel Grande | Telefe |
| 2012 | Graduados | Verónica "Vero" Diorio | Telefe |
| 2014 | La celebración | | Telefe |
| 2014-2015 | Viudas e hijos del Rock & Roll | Sandra Cuevas | Telefe |
| 2015 | Fronteras | Marita Canivaro | Telefe |
| 2017-2018 | Un gallo para Esculapio | Nancy | Telefe |

=== Movies ===
| Year | Movie | Character | Director |
|---|---|---|---|
| 1996 | La maestra normal | | Carlos Orgambide |
| 1997 | Pequeños milagros | Rosalia | Eliseo Subiela |
| 1997 | 24 horas (Algo está por explotar) | Gaby | Luis Barone |
| 2001 | Animalada | | Sergio Bizzio |
| 2011 | Rita y Li | Rita | Francisco D'Intino |
| 2011 | Verano Maldito | Julieta | |
| 2012 | No te enamores de mí | Alejandra | |

=== Television Programs ===
| Year | Program | Channel | Notes |
|---|---|---|---|
| 2014 | Nosotras | Cosmopolitan Televisión | Host |
