= Mex Urtizberea =

Argentine musician, actor, writer, conductor and comedian

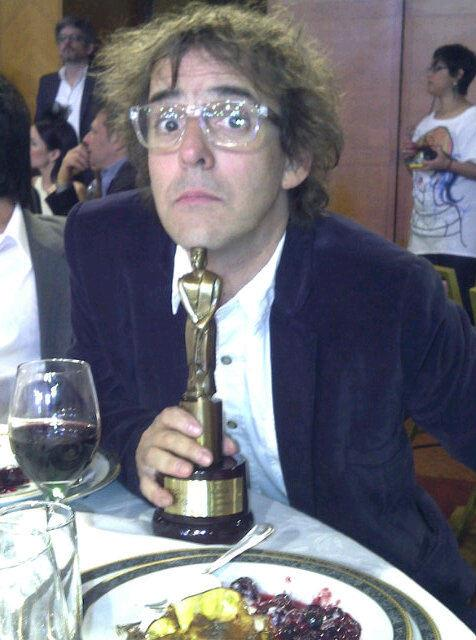

Background information
- Born: October 25, 1960 (age 65); Buenos Aires, Argentina
- Occupations: Musician, actor, writer, TV/radio host, comedian
- Formerly of: MIA, La Sonora del Plata
- Website: www.mexurtizberea.com

Mex Urtizberea (born October 25, 1960, in Buenos Aires, Argentina) is an Argentine musician, actor, writer, TV/radio host and comedian.

In 1980, Mex formed a group called MIA (Músicos Independientes Asociados), along with Lito Vitale. Then in 1988, he made his first album with his band La Sonora del Plata. Then in 1994, along with Alfredo Casero and Lito Vitale, recorded Gestando a la Halibour.
