= Tato Awards =

Argentine awards for television, released by the CAPIT

The Tato Awards (Spanish: Premios Tato) are Argentine awards for television, released by the CAPIT (Cámara Argentina de Productoras Independientes de Televisión). The award is named "Tato" as a homage to the late Tato Bores. First released in 2009, the jury is composed of 843 professionals of the Argentine television. The 52 items voted by more than 2,500 industry professionals and specialized journalists cover the cycles of unitary and daily fiction of 2017's award.

== See also ==
- Latin American television awards
