= 47th Martín Fierro Awards =

Argentinian Award ceremony

47th Annual Martín Fierro Awards
- Awarded for: Martín Fierro Awards for 2016 Argentine television and radio programs
- Sponsored by: Asociación de Periodistas de la Televisión y Radiofonía Argentina
- Location: Hilton Buenos Aires
- Country: Argentina
- Reward: Martín Fierro Awards
- First award: 2017

Television/radio coverage
- Network: El Trece

The 47th Annual Martín Fierro Awards, presented by the Asociación de Periodistas de la Televisión y Radiofonía Argentina (APTRA), was held on June 18, 2017. During the ceremony, APTRA announced the Martín Fierro Awards for 2016 Argentine television and radio programs.

== Awards ==
Winners are listed first and highlighted in boldface. Other nominations are listed in alphabetic order.

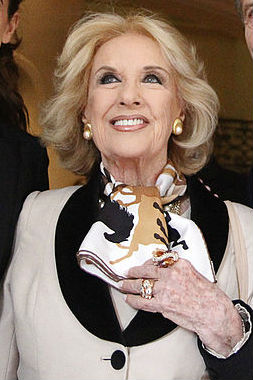
Mirtha Legrand, best female TV host

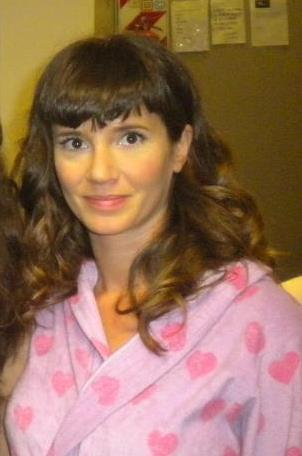
Griselda Siciliani, best actress in daily comedy

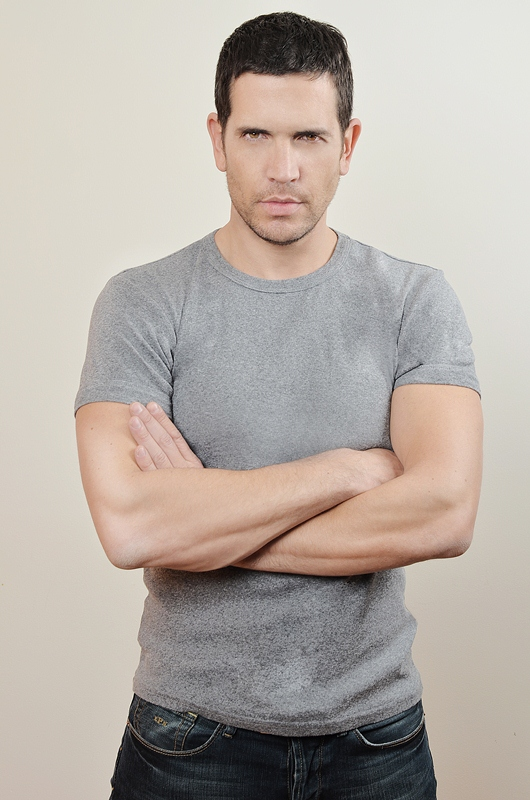
Diego Ramos, best lead actor of daily comedy

Best daily fiction	Best lead actress in daily drama
**La Leona**; Educando a Nina; Los ricos no piden permiso	**Nancy Duplaa** (for La Leona); Araceli González (for Los ricos no piden permiso); Julieta Cardinali (for Los ricos no piden permiso)
Best miniseries	Best lead actor in daily drama
**El Marginal**; Sí, sólo sí; Silencios de familia	**Juan Darthés** (for Los ricos no piden permiso); Gabriel Corrado (for Por amarte así); Luciano Cáceres (for Los ricos no piden permiso); Pablo Echarri (for La Leona)
Best lead actor in miniseries	Best lead actress in miniseries
**Adrián Suar** (for Silencios de familia); Juan Minujín (for El Marginal); Luis Machín (for Las palomas y las bombas)	**Julieta Díaz** (for Silencios de familia); Florencia Bertotti (for Silencios de familia); Martina Gusmán (for El Marginal)
Best lead actor in daily comedy	Best lead actress in daily comedy
**Diego Ramos** (for Educando a Nina); Esteban Lamothe (for Educando a Nina); Rafael Ferro (for Educando a Nina)	**Griselda Siciliani** (for Educando a Nina); Jorgelina Aruzzi (for Educando a Nina); Julieta Zylberberg (for Loco x vos)
Best secondary actress	Best secondary actor
**Maite Zumelzú** (for Por amarte así); Gloria Carrá (for Silencios de familia); Mónica Antonópulos (for La Leona)	**Miguel Ángel Solá** (for La Leona); Carlos Portaluppi (for El Marginal); Raúl Taibo (for Los ricos no piden permiso)
Best author	Best new actor or actress
**Adrián Caetano** and **Guillermo Salmerón** (for El Marginal); Javier Daulte (for Silencios de familia); Pablo Lago and Susana Cardozo (for La Leona)	**Andrea Rincón** (for La Leona); Brian Buley (for El Marginal); Paula Cancio (for La Leona)
Best humoristic program	Best educative TV program
**NotiCampi**; Bendita; Polémica en el bar	**Ambiente y medio**; El país en escena; Si te he visto...
Best advertisement	Best opening theme
**Calles felices**; Buenas migas; Ellos saben	**Silencios de familia** (by Diego Torres); Educando a Nina; La Leona
Best sports program	Best musical program
**Carburando**; Fútbol para todos; Juegos Olímpicos 2016	**Pasión de sábado**; En estéreo; La peña de morfi
Best journalistic program	Best male journalist
**Intratables**; Animales sueltos; Periodismo para todos	**Luis Novaresio** (for Desayuno Americano); Ricardo Canaletti; Reynaldo Sietecase
Best female journalist	Best news reporter
**Luciana Geuna** (for Periodismo para todos); María Belén Aramburu; Romina Manguel	**Ignacio Otero**; Dominique Metzger; Sebastián Domenech
Best panelist	Best TV program for kids
**Paulo Vilouta** (for Intratables); Diego Brancatelli (for Intratables); Diego Leuco (for El diario de Mariana)	**Panam y Circo**; Los creadores; Piñon en familia
Best TV News	Best entertaining program
**Telenoche**; América noticias; Telefe noticias; Noticiero de TV pública	**Susana Giménez**; Como anillo al dedo; Pasapalabra
Best reality show	Best general interest program
**Showmatch**; Dueños de la cocina; Pesadilla en la cocina	**La noche de Mirtha Legrand**; MDQ; Cocineros argentinos
Best magazine	Best work in humor
**El diario de Mariana**; Intrusos; Morfi, todos a la mesa	**Antonio Gasalla** (for Susana Giménez); Claudio Rico (for **Showmatch**); Campi (for NotiCampi)
Best director	Best male TV host
**Alejandro Ripoll** (for Showmatch); Daniel Barone (for Silencios de familia); Luis Ortega (for El Marginal)	**Marcelo Tinelli** (for Showmatch); Guido Kaczka; Iván de Pineda (for Pasapalabra); Chino Leunis (for Escape perfecto); Santiago del Moro (for Intratables)
Best female TV host	Best general production
**Mirtha Legrand** (for La noche de Mirtha Legrand); Carina Zampini (for Morfi, todos a la mesa); Mariana Fabbiani (for El diario de Mariana); Pamela David (for Desayuno americano); Susana Giménez (for Susana Giménez)	**Showmatch**; El Marginal; Periodismo para todos
Golden Martín Fierro Award	
**El Marginal**	

== In Memoriam ==
As is tradition an in memoriam segment tribute was paid to those artists who had died between May 2016 and June 2017. The Argentine singer Abel Pintos sang his song "Sin principio ni fina", while images of the deceased artists was shown.

- Diego Bonadeo
- Alberto Ure
- Juan Carlos Puppo
- Julieta Magaña
- Oscar Alegre (actor)
- Erika Wallner
- Mariana Karr
- Eliseo Subiela
- Héctor Díaz
- Beatriz Día Quiroga
- Diana Ingro
- Leo Rosenwasser
- Marta Longo
- Luis Mazzeo
- Irma Roy
- Carlos Juárez (actor)
- Alberto Marty
- Héctor Sinder
- María Elina Rúas
- Javier Pérez
- Zulma Grey
- Mario Fromenteze
- Susana Mayo
- Horacio Romairone
- Jorge Nolasco
- Guillermo Benites
- Pablo Brichta
- Pocho La Pantera
- Raúl Filippi
- Diego Rafecas
- Roberto Lombard
- Selva Xtabay
- Lucrecia Capello
- Andrés Percivale
- Raquel Fernández
- Ricardo Dupont
- Salo Pasik
- Clever Dusseau
- Jorge Gesdel
- Juan Pablo Laplace
- Lilly Vicet
- Dalmiro Sáenz
- Horacio Guarany
- Hugo Castro
- Eduardo Marchi
- Santiago Vázquez
- Raúl Terzi
- Héctor Armendáriz
- Roberto Vacca
- Juan Carlos Mesa
