= Getap =

Getap or Getap' may refer to:

- Getap, Aragatsotn, Armenia
- Getap, Shirak, Armenia
- Getap, Vayots Dzor, Armenia
- Getap (radio program), Argentine radio program
