= Sos mi hombre =

Argentine telenovela

- Camila Garay (Celeste Cid, left) and Juan José "Ringo" Di Genaro (Luciano Castro, right)
- Genre: Telenovela
- Created by: Adrián Suar
- Written by: Leandro Calderone
- Directed by: Martín Saban; Sebastián Pivotto
- Starring: Luciano Castro; Celeste Cid
- Theme music composer: Alejandro Fernández
- Opening theme: Miénteme
- Country of origin: Argentina
- Original language: Spanish
- No. of seasons: 1
- No. of episodes: 202

Production
- Producers: Adrián Suar; Paula Granica

Original release
- Network: El Trece
- Release: August 21, 2012 – June 24, 2013

Related
- Lobo; Farsantes; Ringo

Sos mi hombre (Spanish: You are the one) is an Argentine telenovela, which aired on El Trece in 2012–2013. It starred Luciano Castro and Celeste Cid.

== Premise ==
The two telenovelas made by Pol-Ka at the beginning of 2012, Lobo and the second season of Los únicos, were cancelled because of poor ratings. Graduados, a fiction aired in the rival channel Telefe, became a huge success. As a result, Pol-Ka rushed the creation of a new telenovela, Sos mi hombre, that filled the timeslot of Lobo. The main actors were Luciano Castro and Celeste Cid. Although Sos mi hombre did not prevail against Graduados either, it had better rating than the previous telenovelas. The last episode had 12,8 rating points.

The program was nominated for the 2013 edition of the Martín Fierro Awards, as best daily fiction. Other nominations are: Luciano Castro as best lead actor of daily fiction, Celeste Cid as lead actress in fiction, Osvaldo Laport as best guest star, Joaquín Furriel as secondary actor in daily fiction, and Eugenia Tobal as secondary actress in daily fiction.

== Controversy ==
The writer Adriana Lorenzón (who wrote El elegido, Por amor a vos and Los Roldán) and the actor Pepe Monje accused the program of being similar to another one they wrote 2 years before. Their program, called "Fuego en tu boca" (Spanish: Fire in your mouth), only had a pilot episode and was never aired. The plot was about a boxer from the La Boca neighbourhood, who also works as a firefighter. Actors Juan Palomino, Maximiliano Guerra, Chechu Bonelli, Jorgelina Aruzzi and Luís Machín worked in that production as well.

The TV channel El Trece replied that the main idea of the telenovela had already been proposed to actor Facundo Arana in 2004, predating both series. The portrayal of the world of box is also similar to previous productions from Pol-Ka, such as Campeones.

== Plot ==
Ringo is a retired boxer, facing economic problems and trying to gain the child custody of his son. He works as a volunteer firefighter. Camila is a young doctor, who works in public hospitals and helps in social diners.

== Cast ==
- Luciano Castro as Juan José "Ringo" Di Genaro
- Celeste Cid as Camila Silvia Garay
- Gabriel Goity as Oscar "Oso" Villar
- Gonzalo Valenzuela as Alejo Correa Luna
- Ludovico Di Santo as Diego Hernán Jáuregui
- Eugenia Tobal as Gloria Calazán
- Jimena Barón as Rosa "Maravillosa" Montes
- Gimena Accardi as Brenda Garay
- Lito Cruz as Manuel Ochoa
- Joaquín Furriel as Ariel Yamil "Turco" Nassif
- Felipe Colombo as Máximo Duarte
- María Rosa Fugazot as Jesusa García García
- Pablo Cedrón as Damasio Flores
- Luz Cipriota as Eva Catalina Ochoa
- Liz Solari as Guadalupe Llorente
- Victorio D'Alessandro as Rafael Villar Medina
- Abel Ayala as Diego Armando "Guachín" Carrazco
- Ariel Staltari as Pepe
- Juan Alari as Ismael "Cachito" Delgado
- Ian Acevedo as Santino Di Genaro
- Adriana Salonia as Sandra Medina
- Esteban Lamothe as Jorge Carrizo
- Bárbara Lombardo as Juana "Zorra" Torres
- Raúl Rizzo as Iván Garay
- Osvaldo Laport as Guido Guevara
- Andrea Pietra as Verónica Santiago
- Luciana González Costa as Marisa
- Diego Alonso Gómez as Garza "Garcés"

== Awards ==
=== Nominations ===
- 2013 Martín Fierro Awards
  - Best actress of daily drama (Celeste Cid)
