= Fernando Santiago =

Spanish painter (1932–2017)

Fernando Santiago "Jacobo"
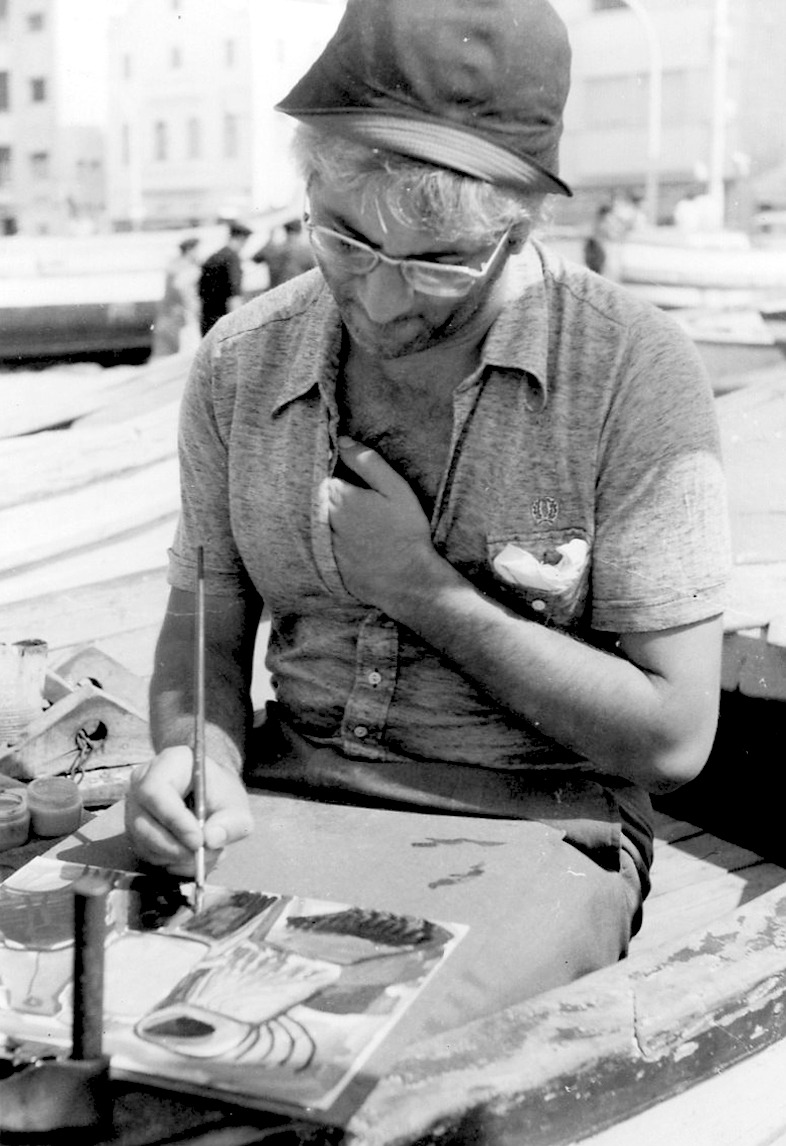
- Born: Fernando Santiago; 1932; Villafrechós, Valladolid
- Died: 2017 (aged 84–85)
- Education: Escuela de Artes y Oficios de Valladolid
- Known for: Painting
- Movement: Modernism

Fernando Santiago ("Jacobo") (1932–2017), Spanish painter, sculptor, and gallery owner, promoter of the so-called Grupo Simancas.

== Biography ==
Fernando Santiago was born Villafrechós (Valladolid) in 1932.

At the age of five, he moved with his family to Valladolid. He attended the School of Arts and Crafts to learn modeling, where he also studied alongside other artists with whom he later developed relationships, such as Félix Cuadrado Lomas or Alejandro Conde López. Later on, he furthered his education at the Círculo de Bellas Artes. At the age of 20, he moved to Paris.

After returning to Spain, Fernando Santiago opened a furniture and home decor store in 1965 at 2 Miguel Íscar Street in Valladolid. There, he organized exhibitions, concerts, conferences, and cultural events. Artists such as Félix Cuadrado Lomas, Domingo Criado, Gabino Gaona, Francisco Sabadell, Jorge Vidal, Alejandro Conde López, among others, exhibited their works in this space, and they became known as the "Grupo Jacobo" (Jacobo Group). The intellectual and artistic activities later moved to Simancas in 1972, where Fernando Santiago purchased spaces for that purpose. A journalist, Emilio Salcedo, dubbed them the "Grupo Simancas" (Simancas Group). Other painters, sculptors, ceramicists, and writers were also associated with the group at various times, both in Valladolid and Simancas.

Fernando Santiago's work revolves around the Castilian landscape as a theme, treated with a personal style characterized by the free and expressive use of color.

Fernando Santiago died on January 8, 2017.

== Bibliography ==
- Ramón Torío (2010): Retrato de familia (autobiografía del Grupo Simancas), Ed. Fuente de la Fama (Diputación de Valladolid). ISBN 978-84-614-0142-0
- Fernando Gutiérrez Baños (2011): Grupo Simancas: paisaje, color, expresión, Fundación Villalar-Castilla y León (Patio Herreriano, Museo de Arte Contemporáneo Español). ISBN 978-84-96286-17-7, ISBN 978-84-937120-9-9.
