= Envious (TV series) =

Argentine comedy drama series

- Spanish: Envidiosa
- Genre: Comedy drama
- Written by: Carolina Aguirre
- Directed by: Gabriel Medina
- Starring: Griselda Siciliani; Esteban Lamothe; Benjamín Vicuña
- Country of origin: Argentina
- Original language: Spanish
- No. of series: 4
- No. of episodes: 43

Production
- Executive producer: Adrián Kaminker
- Producer: Adrián Suar
- Production location: Buenos Aires
- Cinematography: Rivarés Federico
- Editors: Jimena García Molt; Laura Palotini; Mariana Quiroga
- Running time: 25-41 mins
- Production company: Kapow

Original release
- Network: Netflix
- Release: 18 September 2024 – 29 April 2026

Envious (Spanish: Envidiosa) is an Argentine comedy drama television series directed by Gabriel Medina and written by Carolina Aguirre. Produced by Adrián Suar under Kapow, it stars Griselda Siciliani, Esteban Lamothe and Benjamín Vicuña. The series premiered globally on Netflix on 18 September 2024. The second season premiered on February 5, 2025. The series was renewed for a third season, which premiered on November 19, 2025. The fourth and final season premiered on April 29, 2026.

== Cast ==
=== Main ===
- Griselda Siciliani as Victoria Mori
- Esteban Lamothe as Matías Larsen
- Benjamín Vicuña as Nicolás Mastronard (season 1; guest season 2, 4)
- Pilar Gamboa as Carolina Mori
- Violeta Urtizberea as Lucila "Lu" Pedemonte
- Marina Bellati Débora "Debi"
- Bárbara Lombardo as Melina Villalba
- Martín Garabal as Daniel Oribe (season 1–2)
- Lorena Vega as Fernanda Olivera
- Susana Pampín as Teresa

=== Recurring ===
- Leonora Balcarce Magalí "Magui" Roldán (season 1-2)
- Adrián Lakerman Fermín
- Débora Nishimoto as Mei Huang (season 1-2)
- María Abadi as Lola Brown (season 3)

=== Guests ===
- Milla Araújo as Bruna (season 1)
- Patricia Echegoyen as Diana (season 1-2)
- Mimí Ardú as Silvia (season 1-2)
- Camila Peralta as Laura Mori (season 1-2)
- Arturo Puig as Héctor Mori (season 1)
- Germán de Silva as Luis Larsen (Season 1)
- Carla Pandolfi as Marina Iñazú (season 1-2)
- José Giménez Zapiola as Maxi Pasini (2–3 season)
- Agustina Suásquita as Elena "Leni" (season 2-4)
- Gloria Carrá as Violeta (season 2)
- Agustín Aristarán as Felipe (season 3)
- Nicki Nicole as Martina "Virtudes" Vazquez Rey (Season 3)
- Sebastián Wainraich as Oscar (season 3)
- Julieta Cardinali as Nora (season 3–4)
- Dante Barbera as Bruno (season 3–4)
- Leticia Siciliani (season 4)
- Claudio Martínez Bel (season 4)
- Macarena Paz (season 4)

== Episodes ==
=== Series overview ===
Season	Episodes	Originally released
1	12	September 18, 2024
2	11	February 5, 2025
3	10	November 19, 2025
4	10	April 29, 2026

== Production ==
In October 2023, the series was announced on Netflix. Principal photography was commenced in mid-November 2023. In January 2024, the shooting was halted as Griselda Siciliani tested positive for COVID-19. The filming was wrapped in July 2024.

== Reception ==
Diego Lerer of Micropsiacine and Noé R. Rivas of Mindies reviewed the series.
