= Animal's Run =

2011 film

- Film poster
- Spanish: La carrera del animal
- Directed by: Nicolás Grosso
- Written by: Nicolás Grosso
- Starring: Valentin Tello; Lautaro Vilo; Gonzalo Martínez; Valeria Lois; Ignacio Rogers; Marcelo Pozzi
- Cinematography: Gustavo Biazzi
- Music by: Pommez Internacional
- Release dates: 11 April 2011 (BAFICI); 23 February 2012 (Argentina)
- Running time: 73 minutes
- Country: Argentina
- Language: Spanish

Animal's Run (Spanish: La carrera del animal) is a 2011 Argentine drama film written and directed by Nicolás Grosso. The film won the Jury Prize at the 2011 Buenos Aires International Independent Film Festival.

== Plot ==
The closure of a factory produces a crisis for the owner, a father in the film who remains in the shadows, marking from there the fate of his two children, the other two main characters and protagonists: Valentine, the youngest, who lives humbly away from the family business; and Cándido, the elder, who seems better prepared for the power and violence game of business, even if it means harming his own family.

== Cast ==
- Julián Tello
- Lautaro Vilo
- Gonzalo Martínez
- Valeria Lois
- Ignacio Rogers
- Marcelo Pozzi
- Esteban Lamothe
