= El elegido =

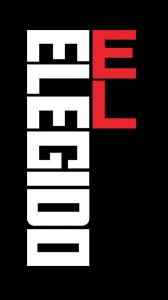
- Created by: Adriana Lorenzón; Pablo Echarri
- Written by: Gustavo Lorenzón Belatti; Adriana
- Directed by: Pablo Ambrosini; Omar Aiello; Negro Luna
- Starring: Pablo Echarri; Paola Krum; Leticia Brédice
- Opening theme: Sólo hay una ley
- Country of origin: Argentina
- Original language: Spanish
- No. of seasons: 1
- No. of episodes: 154

Production
- Producers: Federico D'Elía; Ronnie Amendolara; Andrea Tuozzo; Pablo Echarri; Martín Seefeld
- Production company: El Árbol

Original release
- Network: Telefe
- Release: January 17 – October 31, 2011

Related
- Caín y Abel; Dulce amor

El elegido (English: The Chosen) is an Argentine telenovela produced by El Árbol and aired by Telefe.

== Cast ==
=== Main characters ===
- Pablo Echarri as Andrés Bilbao
- Paola Krum as Mariana Estevez
- Leticia Brédice as Veronica San Martin (†)

=== Co-starring ===
- Lito Cruz as Oscar Nevares Sosa
- Leonor Manso as María Bilbao (†)
- Patricio Contreras as Alfredo Bilbao (†)
- Mónica Antonópulos as Greta Sáenz Valiente
- Martín Seefeld as Santiago Mercado
- Jorge Suárez as Roberto Planes
- María Carámbula as Lucía Giuliani
- Luciano Cáceres as David Nevares Sosa (†)
- Lucrecia Capello as Silvia Escalada Blanco
- Ludovico Di Santo as Octavio Linares Calvo
- Calu Rivero as Érica Martínez
- Emilio Bardi as Alejandro Bilbao
- Paloma Contreras as Mariela Bilbao
- Paula Kohan as Giovana "Gigí" Gilardoni (†)
- María Dupláa as Jimena Estévez
- Maite Lanata as Alma Bilbao
- Daniel Fanego as Arturo Logroñeses

=== Special performance ===
- Jorge D'Elía as Daniel Morbillo

=== Participations ===
- Jorge Rivera López as Tomás
- Norberto Díaz as Dante Oviedo
- Ricardo Díaz Mourelle as Marcos Mariani (†)
- Fabio Aste as Jorge Pirra (†)
- Daniel Miglioranza as Rinaudo (†)
- Gabo Correa as Rogelio Rossi
- Julio Viera as Augusto (†)
- Catalina Artusi as Yessica "Colet" Álvarez
- Emilia Mazer as Julia
- Alfredo Castellani as Hassef
- Isabel Quinteros as Teresa
- María Ibarreta as Elena Ferrari
- Oscar Alegre as Miguel
- Jorge Sabaté as Mauricio Linares Calvo
- Lautaro Delgado as Carlos Gualtieri
- Cecilia Roth as Victoria Sucre
- Carlos Santamaría as Gonzalo Nievas (†)
- Lidia Catalano as Úrsula "Tita"
- Juan Luppi as Camilo
- Leonora Balcarce as Paloma Riccardi
- Cristina Tejedor as Laura Jin
- Roberto Vallejos as Rafael (†)
- Carlos Bermejo as Rómulo Rosales

== Deaths ==
- Ricardo Estevez (Mariana's father)
- Papá de Veronica San Martin
- Jorge Pirra
- Gonzalo Nievas
- María Bilbao (Andres' mother)
- Alfredo Bilbao (Andres' father)
- Gigi (Greta's ex-girlfriend)
- David Nevares Sosa
- Arturo Logroñeses
- Rafael
- Veronica San Martin

== International broadcasts ==
- United States - Azteca América
- Uruguay - Monte Carlo TV
- Israel - Viva
