= La Leona (Argentine TV series) =

- Genre: Telenovela
- Created by: El Árbol; Telefe Contenidos
- Written by: Pablo Lago; Susana Cardozo
- Directed by: Pablo Ambrosini; Omar Aiello; Negro Luna
- Starring: Nancy Dupláa; Pablo Echarri; Miguel Ángel Solá; Juan Gil Navarro; Esther Goris; Dolores Fonzi; Marco Antonio Caponi; Ludovico Di Santo; Martín Seefeld; Juan Pedro Lanzani; Mónica Antonópulos
- Theme music composer: Miss Bolivia
- Opening theme: "María, María"
- Country of origin: Argentina
- Original language: Spanish
- No. of seasons: 1
- No. of episodes: 116

Production
- Producers: Pablo Echarri; Martín Seefeld; Gustavo Marra
- Running time: 60 minutes

Original release
- Network: Telefe
- Release: January 18 – July 14, 2016

Related
- Entre caníbales; Amar, después de amar

La Leona is an Argentine telenovela produced by El Árbol by Pablo Echarri and Martín Seefeld in association with Telefe Contenidos. Its first broadcast was on January 18, 2016 and its last broadcast on July 14, 2016 after 116 chapters. It was transmitted from Monday to Friday at 11:45 pm on the screen of Telefe. It was starred by Nancy Dupláa and Pablo Echarri and the antagonistic participations of Miguel Ángel Solá, Esther Goris, Marco Antonio Caponi, Ludovico Di Santo, Juan Gil Navarro, Dolores Fonzi, Martín Seefeld, Juan Pedro Lanzani and Mónica Antonópulos. The program featured the stellar performances of Susú Pecoraro, Patricia Palmer, Andrea Pietra, Lito Cruz, Paula Cancio, Julia Calvo, Diego Alonso Gómez, Nico García, Alfredo Castellani and the special participation of Hugo Arana. It also has the youth participation of Antonia Bengoechea, Joaquín Flamini and Azul Fernández and the debut of Andrea Rincón as an actress on television. The Television Series won the 2017 Martín Fierro for Best Daily Fiction.

== Plot ==
It is based on a textile factory about to break where María Leone (Nancy Dupláa) will play a fundamental role, defending the rights of the employees of this factory owned by the Miller family.

== Cast ==
- Nancy Dupláa as María "La Leona" Leone
- Pablo Echarri as Franco Uribe/Diego Miller Liberman
- Marco Antonio Caponi as Rodrigo Cáceres
- Ludovico Di Santo as Alex Arizmendi
- Miguel Ángel Solá as Klaus Miller
- Diego Alonso Gómez as Fabián Suárez
- Susú Pecoraro as Sofía Uribe/Sarah Liberman
- Esther Goris as Diana Liberman
- Juan Pedro Lanzani as Brian Miller Liberman
- Hugo Arana as Pedro Salvador Leone
- Juan Gil Navarro as Gabriel Miller Liberman
- Patricia Palmer as Isabella Medeiros
- Dolores Fonzi as Eugenia Leone
- Martín Seefeld as Coco Zanneti
- Andrea Pietra as Estela Castro
- Lito Cruz as Homero Stronatti
- Pepe Soriano as Samuel Liberman
- Mónica Antonópulos as Julieta "July" Irigoyen
- Julia Calvo as Beatriz "Betty" Pardo
- Alfredo Castellani as Bernardo García
- Antonia Bengoechea as Abril Uribe Pécora/Abril Miller Pécora
- Paula Cancio as Nurith Torres
- Nico García as Charly Leone
- Joaquín Flamini as Facundo Leone/Suárez
- Azul Fernández as Paola Zanneti
- Andrea Rincón as Carla Fiorito
- Natalia Figueiras as Pía Bebilacua
- María Dupláa as Vera Ortíz
- Delfina Chaves as Ruth Liberman
- Alejandra Darín as Esther Liberman
- Nahuel Mutti as Canevaro
- Ricardo Larrama as Jacinto
- Gastón Biagioni as Luna
- Horacio Roca as Kepler
- Martín Gross as Polaco
- Mario Moscoso as Benítez
- Sandra Villani as Arrollo
- Liliana López Foresi as Carmen
- Malena Narvay as Young María Leone
- Lucas Escariz as Young Klaus Miller
- Bárbara Strauss as Young Diana Liberman
- Delfina Chaves as Young Sarah Liberman
- Fabián Fiori as Commissioner Marquez
- Gustavo De Filpo as journalist

== Awards ==
- 47th Martín Fierro Awards
  - Best daily fiction
  - Best lead actress in daily drama (Nancy Dupláa)
  - Best secondary actor (Miguel Ángel Solá)
  - Best new actor (Andrea Rincón)

=== Nominations ===
- 47th Martín Fierro Awards
  - Best lead actor of daily drama (Pablo Echarri)
  - Best secondary actress (Mónica Antonópulos)
  - Best new actor (Paula Cancio)
  - Best writer (Pablo Lago and Susana Cardozo)
  - Best opening theme ("María María" by Miss Bolivia)
