= Manguel =

Manguel is a surname. Notable people with the surname include:

- Alberto Manguel (born 1948), Argentine writer
- Romina Manguel, Argentine radio host and journalist

== See also ==
- Manuel (name)
