= Viudas e hijos del Rock & Roll =

- Up: Rama Ferrer (Fernán Mirás), Miranda Bettini de Arostegui (Paola Barrientos), Pipo Roch (Mex Urtizberea). Middle: Sandra Cuevas (Julieta Ortega), Diego Lamas (Damián De Santo), Segundo Arostegui (Juan Minujín). Below: Vera Santoro (Celeste Cid)
- Genre: Telenovela
- Created by: Sebastián Ortega
- Written by: Ernesto Korovsky; Silvina Fredjkes; Alejandro Quesada
- Directed by: Miguel Colom
- Starring: Paola Barrientos; Damián De Santo
- Theme music composer: Tan Biónica
- Opening theme: "Tus horas mágicas"
- Country of origin: Argentina
- Original language: Spanish
- No. of seasons: 1

Production
- Producer: Pablo Culell

Original release
- Network: Telefe
- Release: August 18, 2014 – May 13, 2015

Viudas e hijos del Rock and Roll (English: Widows and Sons of Rock and Roll) is a 2014 Argentine telenovela, starring Damián De Santo and Paola Barrientos. It includes several references to Argentine rock of the 1990s.

The show ended on May 13, 2015.

== Plot ==
Diego Lamas and Miranda Betini were two rockers who met in Villa Gesell in 1992. Miranda was the daughter of Roby, a famous radio host, but concealed that information from Diego. They had a brief romance, and arranged to reunite in their native Buenos Aires, next to the Obelisco, the next month. Sandra, Miranda's best friend, started a romance with Roby, so she rejected them both. Diego had a car accident and could not meet Miranda at the agreed time, so she broke with him and with the whole rock and roll lifestyle.

The ellipsis jumps to the modern day, Miranda is married to Segundo, and Diego is about to marry Susana. Roby dies, and Diego briefly sees Miranda at his funeral, which was broadcast on TV, and is reunited with her. Miranda and Sandra met Vera as well, another daughter of Roby, who was born out of wedlock. As widow and daughters of Roby, Sandra, Miranda and Vera share each a fourth part of the shares of the radio, alongside Roby's assistant, Pipo. Vera convinces the others to give a radio program to Diego and his friend Rama.

Diego rejects Susana in their wedding and slowly starts a romance with Miranda. Both of their mothers (Titi and Gabriela, respectively) became friends and try to influence them to pursuit it. Segundo is a closeted gay, who develops a crush on his petisero Tony. Miranda and Segundo break up in good terms, and she also helps him to discover that his true mother is María Esther, a former maid of the Arostegui raped by Emilio. Sandra eventually amends her relation with Miranda, and gets pregnant from Rama. Rama, however, stays with Vera. With the exception of Miranda and Segundo, who had their own successful jobs, the Arostegui lost all their money and their mansion, and must move to a small apartment. The last episode featured the gay wedding of Segundo and Tony.

== Production ==
The filming started in May 2014.

=== Cast ===
Viudas e hijos del Rock and Roll is the first work of Paola Barrientos as a lead actress in television. She had a long career in theater plays, and her character in Graduados got a lot of praise. Still, she clarified that both characters are different: her character in Graduados was formal, and her character in "Viudas..." is a rebel rocker. She accepted to work in the telenovela because she had a good relation with the other actors of the cast.

Griselda Siciliani worked for Telefe for the first time. Although she worked several years at the competitor channel El Trece, her husband Adrián Suar produces telenovelas at that channel, and is scheduled to appear in cameos in Guapas, Siciliani clarified that they had no conflictive views over that. Her work is limited to 18 episodes, as she had worked a full year in Farsantes and prefers to stay more time with her daughter.

=== Music ===
The telenovela uses several references to the 1990s Argentine Rock, and uses the music both for character building and the plots. The telenovela is also set in a fictional radio. The first episodes featured as well other things from the 1990s, such as the "rolinga" urban tribe, the boom of radio stations airing rock, the popularity of Villa Gesell among the young people, and the creation of mixtapes in cassettes. The starting point of the telenovela is the death of Roby, a character played by Lalo Mir, which is described as an icon of Argentine rock.

== Reception ==
The first episode was aired on August 18, with 24,3 rating points. It had the highest rating of the prime time on that day, over Showmatch. The public praised the similarities with the telenovela Graduados, aired in 2012, both in the initial plot and the focus on nostalgia. "Graduados 2" became a trending topic in Twitter that night.

Later on, Viudas... did not achieve the expected ratings, and had a lower success than the re-run of the Turkish Binbir Gece (translated as "Las mil y una noches"). The new time slots and the 80 guest stars did not help it to recover the initial ratings. It ended after 10 months, without living up to expectations.

=== Awards ===
Viudas... received seven nominations for the 45th Martín Fierro Awards: best daily fiction, lead actor of daily fiction (Damián de Santo and Juan Minujin), lead actress of daily fiction (Paola Barrientos), best new actor (Dario Barassi), best writers and best music theme. Sebastián Ortega and Pablo Culell were surprised by the absence of Verónica Llinás and Luis Machín, and did not attend the ceremony.

== Cast ==
- Damián De Santo as Diego Lamas
- Paola Barrientos as Miranda Bettini de Arostegui
- Celeste Cid as Vera Santoro / Vera Bettini
- Julieta Ortega as Sandra Cuevas
- Juan Minujín as Segundo "Second" Arostegui
- Mex Urtizberea as Pipo Roch
- Fernán Mirás as Ramiro "Rama" Ferrer
- Ludovico Di Santo as Ignacio "Nacho" Arostegui
- Luis Machín as Luis Emilio Arostegui III
- Verónica Llinás as Inés Murray Tedin Puch de Arostegui
- Violeta Urtizberea as Lourdes Sánchez Elías de Arostegui
- Darío Lopilato as Agustín "El Piojo" Pulido
- Nicolás Francella as Federico Ventura / Federico Roch
- Lalo Mir as Roby Bettini / Juan Carlos Bettini
- Griselda Siciliani as Susana "Susy" Bartolotti
- Hugo Arana as Amílcar Bartolotti
- Daniel Aráoz as Raúl Persa
- Jorgelina Aruzzi as Vivian Acosta
- Cecilia Roth as Ingrid Santoro Ardanaz
- Florencia Peña as Denise Saravia
- Andy Kusnetzoff as Mariano Letterman
- Daniela Herrero as Paula Peñalba
- Chino Darín as Franco Pilares / Franco Bettini
- Eva De Dominici as Mirta "La Pioja" Pulido
- Benjamín Alfonso as Facundo
- Luis Margani as Remigio
- Julieta Cardinali as Lola
- Henny Trayles as Ruth
- Catherine Fulop as Miriam
- María Leal as Gabriela "Gaby" Bianchi
- Eliseo Barrionuevo as Bautista Emilio Arostegui
- Agustina Prinsich as María de la Paz Alcántara Echagüe
- Arian Barbieri as Blas Arostegui
- Byron Barbieri as Lautaro Arostegui
- Antonio Birabent as Bruno Viale
- Marcelo Mazzarello as Estanislao "El Polaco" Karlovich
- Georgina Barbarossa as Beatriz "Tití" Cancela
- Maju Lozano as Mariana Fasano
- Juan Sorini as Antonio "Tony" Emmanuel Gilberto Soilo
- Natalia Figueiras as Alina Mussi
- Paula Baldini as Estela Rovner
- Iride Mockert as Iaia López
- Joe Seitun as Micky Viriloni
- Darío Barassi as Pedro Gatto
- Sheila González as Mayra Poli
- Humberto Tortonese as Paco Acevedo Lainez
- Ernestina Pais as Laura Viviani
- Vivian El Jaber as Martita Cano
- Esteban Meloni as José María Uriburu
- Mauricio Lavaselli as Manu
- Carla Moure as Brenda
- Sol Jaite as Lucía
- Mariana Chaud as Edith
- Emme as Flor
- Mónica Gonzaga as Fini
- Marcelo De Bellis as Oscar
- Edda Díaz as Norma
- Damián Dreizik as Warner
- Gabo Correa as Fiscal
- Alejandra Flechner as María Esther
- Oscar Ferrigno as Oficial
- Juan Ignacio Machado as Angelito

=== Special Participation ===
- Charly García
- Alejandro Lerner
- Sandra Mihanovich
- Hilda Lizarazu
- Bersuit Vergarabat
- Kapanga
- Fito Páez
- Los Tipitos
- Adrián Barilari
- Sergio Denis
- Valeria Mazza
- Marky Ramone
- Gustavo Cordera
- David Lebón
- Leo García
- Pablo Ruiz
- Pablo Echarri
- Palito Ortega
- Nancy Dupláa
- Nito Mestre
- Celeste Carballo
- Fabiana Cantilo
- Ciro Pertusi
- Marta Minujín
- Marcelo Moura
- Sebastián Wainraic
- Iván Noble
- Juanse
- Pía Shaw
- Elizabeth Vernaci
- Matías Martin
- Jóvenes Pordioseros
- Toti Iglesias
- Martin Fabio
- Viuda e Hijas de Roque Enroll
- Claudia Ruffinatti
- Claudia Mabel Sinesi
- Mavi Díaz
- Juan di Natale
- Rosario Ortega
- Nequi Galotti
- Bebe Sanzo
- Mabby Autino
- Benito Fernández
- Solange Cubillo
- Chano Moreno Charpentier
- Roxana Zarecki
- Débora Bello
- Daniel Agostini
- Leo Veterale
- Ezequiel Cwirkaluk
- Julieta Fazzari
- Nancy Anka
- Gabriela Allegue
- Teté Coustarot
- Ella Es tan Cargosa
- Victoria Saravia
- Jauría
