= Educando a Nina =

Argentine telenovela

- Genre: Telenovela; Comedy
- Created by: Sebastián Ortega
- Written by: Ernesto Korovsky; Silvina Frejdkes; Alejandro Quesada
- Directed by: Mariano Ardanaz; Javier Perez; Daniel De Felippo
- Starring: Griselda Siciliani; Esteban Lamothe; Rafael Ferro; Verónica Llinás; Juan Leyrado; Diego Ramos; Jorgelina Aruzzi; Mercedes Scápola
- Opening theme: Educando a Nina by Palito Ortega and La Mona Jiménez
- Country of origin: Argentina
- Original language: Spanish
- No. of episodes: 136

Production
- Executive producer: Gustavo Errico
- Producer: Pablo Culell
- Production locations: Buenos Aires, Argentina
- Editors: Guille Gatti; Pablo Bologna; Bruno Weinstein; Jonathan Smeke
- Running time: 60 minutes
- Production companies: Telefe; Underground Producciones

Original release
- Release: April 11 – December 1, 2016

Related
- Viudas e hijos del Rock & Roll

Educando a Nina (English: Educating Nina) is a 2016 Argentine telenovela produced by Underground Producciones and broadcast by Telefe from April 11 to December 1, 2016, starring Griselda Siciliani, Esteban Lamothe, Rafael Ferro, Diego Ramos and Verónica Llinás in the lead roles.

== Cast and characters ==
- Griselda Siciliani as Nina Peralta / Mara Brunetta
- Fiorela Duranda as Nina Peralta (child)
- Esteban Lamothe as Renzo Di Caro
- Rafael Ferro as Antonio Di Caro
- Verónica Llinás as Mecha Ludueña
- Juan Leyrado as Manuel Brunetta
- Nicolás Furtado as Lalo "el Bicho" Ludueña
- Diego Ramos as Patricio Arenas
- Jorgelina Aruzzi as Susy Contreras
- Carola Reyna as Andrea Mansilla
- Enrique Liporace as José Peralta
- Martín Slipak as Salo Yepes
- Benjamín Alfonso as Tincho Massey
- Marina Castillo as Perla Bergara
- Mercedes Scápola as Milagros Alonso Sánchez
- Vivian El Jaber as Selva Juarez
- Laura Cymer as Carmela Prado
- Victoria Almeida as Sofía Lavalle
- Turco Naim as Palomo
- Federico Avalos as Tatuado
- Chachi Telesco as Magaly
- Lucas Velasco as Picky
- Carmen de la Osa as Blondy
- Noralíh Gago as Jenny
- Alma Gandini as Rosa
- Facundo Gambandé as Leonardo
- Carli Jiménez
- Eugenia Alonso
- Goly Turilli as Amparo
- Paloma Heredia as Isabel
- Darío Barassi as Nicolás
- Julieta Zylberberg as Lola Benitez
- Violeta Urtizberea as Graciela
- Jimena Barón as Belén

== Awards ==
=== Nominations ===
- 47th Martín Fierro Awards
  - Best daily fiction
