= Esteban Lamothe =

Argentine actor (born 1977)

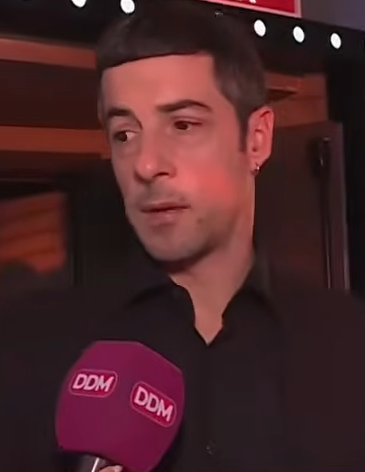
- Esteban Lamothe at the Martín Fierro Awards in 2025
- Born: Raúl Esteban Sánchez Lamothe; 30 April 1977 (age 49); Florentino Ameghino, Buenos Aires, Argentina
- Occupation: Actor
- Years active: 2002–present
- Partners: Julieta Zylberberg (2007–2017); Katia Szechtman (2017–2021)
- Children: 1

Raúl Esteban Sánchez Lamothe (born 30 April 1977) is an Argentine actor.

== Biography ==
Esteban Lamothe was born on 30 April 1977 in Florentino Ameghino, Buenos Aires, Argentina. At 17, in 1994, he moved to Federal Capital. He worked until age 30 as a waiter, until he got roles in films and television strips.

== Career ==
In 2011, with the film The Student he got his work more visibility. As of 2012, it acquires greater popularity by participating in fictions such as Sos mi hombre and Farsantes, both transmitted by Canal 13. His first protagonist was in Guapas, series transmitted by Canal 13. In 2015, along with María Eugenia Suárez, he starred in the film Abzurdah in the role of Alejo. In 2016, he stars in Educando a Nina, daily fiction of Underground Productions broadcast on Telefe. In that same year he also plays the main character in the series Estocolmo. In 2017, he plays the character of Javier "Javo" Valdés, in the series Las Estrellas (telenovela), beside Celeste Cid, Marcela Kloosterboer, Violeta Urtizberea, Natalie Pérez, Justina Bustos, Gonzalo Valenzuela, Luciano Castro and Rafael Ferro, among others. He obtained the Martín Fierro as the Leading Actor of Daily Fiction. In 2018 he is the protagonist of the second part of El marginal, instead of Juan Minujín. In 2019 he stars in the series Campanas en la noche together with Federico Amador and Calu Rivero, he plays the villain Vito Paternó.

== Personal life ==
He was in a relationship from 2007 with actress Julieta Zylberberg. On 8 December 2012 they became parents of a boy named Luis Ernesto Lamothe Zylberberg. On 31 May 2017 Lamothe confirmed his separation.

== Filmography ==
=== Movies ===
Year	Movie	Character	Director	Notes
2004	La vida por Perón	Alfredo		
2005	Tiempo de valientes	Liniers	Damián Szifron	
2006	El pasado	Boy	Héctor Babenco	
2008	El nido vacío	Waiter	Daniel Burman	
2008	Historias extraordinarias	The husband	Mariano Llinás	
2009	Castro	Acuña		
2009	Todos mienten	JNR		
2010	Rosalinda	Ernesto		medium length
2010	Lo que más quiero			
2011	Nocturnos			
2011	Vaquero			
2011	The Student	Roque Espinosa	Santiago Mitre	
2011	Los crímenes			short film
2011	Por un tiempo	Leandro		
2012	La carrera del animal		Nicolás Grosso	
2012	Villegas	Esteban		
2013	Pensé que iba a haber fiesta	Omar		
2014	Lock Charmer	Sebastián	Natalia Smirnoff	
2015	El 5 de Talleres	Patón	Adrián Biniez	
2015	Abzurdah	Alejo	Daniela Goggi	
2015	Paulina	Alberto	Santiago Mitre	
2016	Amateur	Martín Suárez	Sebastián Perillo	
2018	La educación del rey	Santiago Esteves		
2023	Women on the Edge	Fercho	Azul Lombardía	
2026	Glaxo		Benjamín Naishtat	

=== Television ===
Year	Title	Character	Channel
2012-2013	Sos mi hombre	Jorge Carrizo	Canal 13
2013-2014	Farsantes	Antonio Manero	Canal 13
2014-2015	Guapas	Pablo González	Canal 13
2016	Educando a Nina	Renzo Di Caro	Telefe
2016	Estocolmo	Gonzalo "Agent H"	Netflix
2017-2018	Las Estrellas (telenovela)	Javier "Javo" Valdés	Canal 13
2018	El marginal	Patricio Salgado	TV Pública
2019	Campanas en la noche	Vito Paternó	Telefe
2019	Medusa		Telefe/Cablevisión Flow/Netflix
2020	El marginal	Patricio "Doc" Salgado	TV Publica
2020	Puerta 7	Fabián	Canal 13/Netflix
2021	La 1-518, somos uno	Lorenzo Martínez Arias	Canal 13

=== Video clips ===
Year	Artist	Song	Director
2019	Ca7riel and Paco Amoroso	Ouke	

== Awards and nominations ==
Year	Award	Category	Work	Result
2011	Silver Condor Awards	Male revelation	The Student	Winner
2011	Festival Internacional de Cine de Cartagena	Best Actor	The Student	Winner
2014	Silver Condor Awards	Best Actor	Lock Charmer	Nominated
2015	Silver Condor Awards	Best Actor	El 5 de Talleres	Nominated
2015	Sur Awards	Best Leading Actor	Abzurdah	Nominated
2016	Tato Awards	Best Leading Comedy Actor	Educando a Nina	Nominated
2016	Martín Fierro Awards	Best Actor in Comedy Daily Fiction	Educando a Nina	Nominated
2017	Tato Awards	Best leading daily fiction actor	Las Estrellas (telenovela)	Nominated
2017	Notirey Awards	Best male protagonist of daily fiction	Las Estrellas (telenovela)	Winner
2017	Martín Fierro Awards	Best protagonist of daily fiction	Las Estrellas (telenovela)	Winner
