= Griselda Siciliani =

Argentine actress, singer and dancer (born 1978)

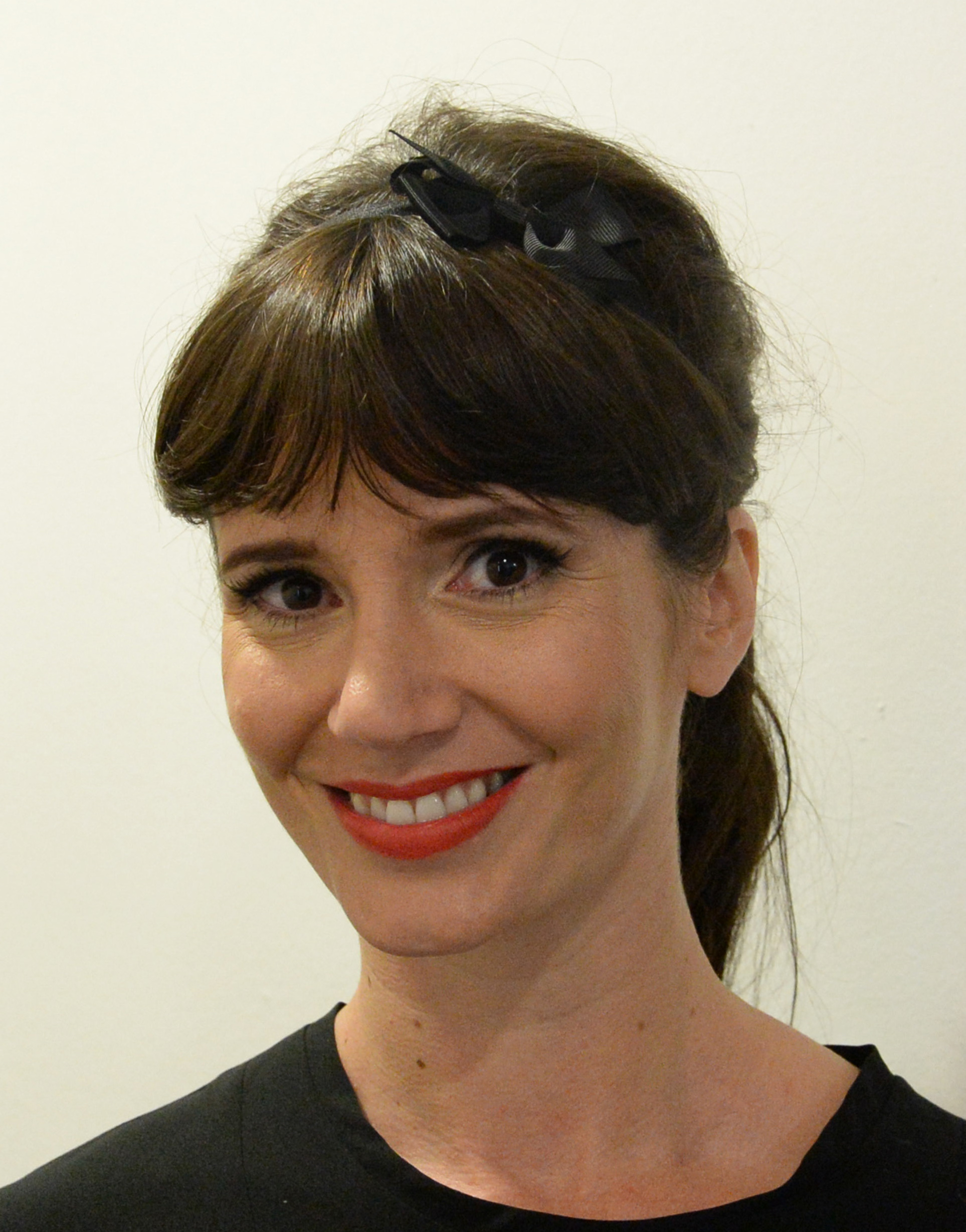
- Siciliani in 2015
- Born: 2 April 1978 (age 48); Buenos Aires, Argentina
- Occupations: Actress; singer; dancer
- Years active: 2004–present
- Partner(s): Adrián Suar (2008–2016); Luciano Castro (2024–2026)
- Children: 1
- Relatives: Leticia Siciliani (sister)

Griselda Siciliani (born 2 April 1978) is an Argentine actress, singer and dancer.

== Biography ==
Griselda Siciliani began her career in musical comedy, and took part in the theater play "Revista Nacional". She met American-born actor and producer Adrián Suar, who cast her to play a secretary in Sin Código, a satirical police sitcom where Suar was the main actor. Her character was named "Flor", a nerd that fell in love with her boss, who did not even notice. Griselda won the Clarín Award and Martín Fierro Award as best female revelation for this role. She posed for the Argentine edition of Playboy magazine, but she was not satisfied with the production.

She worked the following year in the Sos mi vida telenovela, and in the musical Sweet Charity. Debbie, her character in Sos mi vida, a shallow woman with many clichés, became more popular than her previous one roles. During that program she became friends with fellow actress Carla Peterson, and although they did not work together again in the same TV production, they arranged a joint theater play in 2009, "Corazón Idiota".

Her first leading role was in 2007, in the teen drama Patito Feo. Her character "Carmen" was the mother of the main character, and the main adult character. The telenovela included musicals and an international tour by the end of the year, so she also had to sing and dance. The success of Patito Feo allowed for a second season in 2008. Siciliani had a relationship with Adrian Suar from 2008 to 2016. They have a daughter Margarita, born on June 15, 2012.

She worked in Para vestir santos, and later at the superhero live-action television series Los únicos. Siciliani is the main actress, along with Mariano Martínez and Nicolás Cabré. Although Nicolás Cabré plays his former character of "Axel Etcheverry" from the Sin Código 2005 telenovela, the character of Siciliani is unrelated to her former character of "Flor". This time, she plays "María Soledad Marini", a stealth agent with superhuman strength.

== Works ==
=== Films ===
Year	Film	Character	Notes
2012	The Last Elvis	Alejandra Olemberg	
2020	The People Upstairs	Ana	
2022	Bardo, False Chronicle of a Handful of Truths	Lucía Gama	

=== TV ===
Year	Program	Character	Notes
2005	Sin código	Flor	
2006	Sos mi vida	Debbie Quesada	
2007–2008	Patito feo	Carmen Castro	
2009	Tratame bien	Denise	
2010	Para vestir santos	Virginia San Juan	
2011	Los únicos	María Soledad Marini	
2013	Farsantes	Gabriela Soria	44th Martín Fierro Awards- Best lead actress of daily drama
2014	Viudas e hijos del Rock and Roll	Susana Bartolotti	
2016	Educando a Nina	Nina Peralta / Mara Brunetta	47th Martín Fierro Awards- Best lead actress in daily comedy
2018	Morir de amor	Helena Karsten	
2019	Bailando 2019	Herself	Withdrew
2024	Terapia alternativa	Serena	
2024	Envious	Victoria Mori	
2026	Moria	middle-aged Moria	

=== Theater plays ===
- Corazón Idiota
- La Forma de Las Cosas
- Sweet Charity
- Quiero Llenarme de Ti
- El Rebenque Show
- La Revista Nacional
- Los Reyes
- Tan Modositas
- Hermosura
- De Protesta
- La Danza Cansa
- Los Muvis
- La Vuelta Manzana
- Sputza
- Sugar

== Awards ==
- 2013 Martín Fierro Awards: Best actress of daily drama (for Farsantes)
