= Calu Rivero =

Argentine actress and model

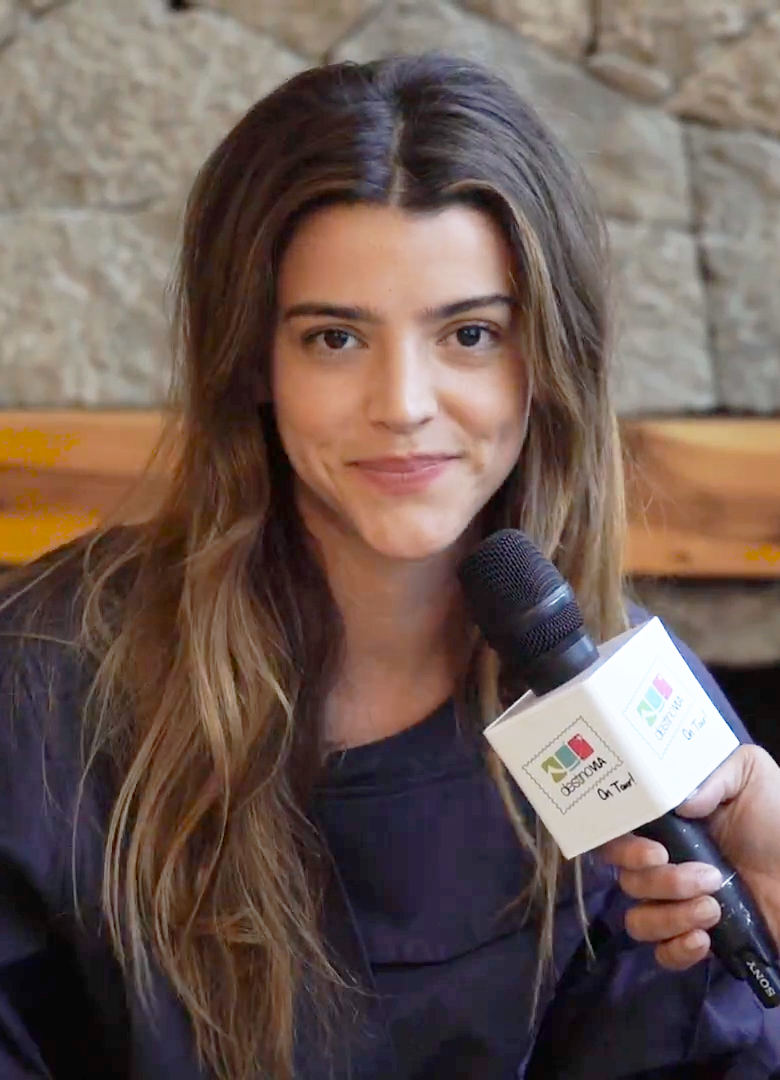
- Rivero in 2018
- Born: Carla Soledad Rivero; 5 April 1987 (age 39); Catamarca, Argentina
- Other name: Dignity
- Occupations: Actress; model
- Years active: 2006–present
- Children: 2

Carla Soledad "Calu" Rivero (born 5 April 1987) is an Argentine actress and model.

== Early life ==
Carla Soledad Rivero was born in Recreo, Catamarca. She is of Hispanic and Italian origin. She moved with her family to Córdoba at the age of six. Her nickname "Calu" was given by her older sister because of a character called Kalú in the Chilean telenovela Tic tac.

== Career ==
=== Early work (2006–2007) ===
Having finished secondary school, Rivero began studying dramatic arts in the National University of Córdoba. Being passionate about clothes, she hosted a television show about fashion until she was 19.

In 2006 Rivero moved to Buenos Aires to pursue her acting career and began taking drama classes with Norman Briski. In 2007 she was called for temporary works as an extra in Son de Fierro and Lalola.

=== Breakthrough (2007-2011) ===
Rivero's breakthrough television role was in Patito feo in August 2007 where she was cast as the villain. The character was popular and as a result, Rivero started gaining a following. She was the first actress from Catamarca to appear on national television. Because of this, she was named Illustrious Citizen of Recreo.

She also appeared in television shows such as Atrapados, Champs 12, Casi ángeles and Alguien que me quiera. Rivero's modeling career boomed, being the face of both national and international companies such as Nike, TOMS Shoes, Agatha Ruíz de la Padra, La Casa de las Botas, Sweet Victorian, Todo Moda, 47 Street and Roho.

=== 2011–present ===
In early 2011, Rivero was called to be part of El elegido, with Pablo Echarri. Her role gave her critical acclaim. In February, Rivero designed her own winter collection for the Argentine fashion Complot.

In mid-2011, Rivero starred in the music video for "Please Me" by the Argentine band Poncho. The song was very successful in Argentina, considered the summer hit of 2012. This fact heightened Rivero's popularity.

By the end of 2011, Calu Rivero became one of the most sought-after actresses in Argentina, considered the new national "It girl" and a fashion icon.

In 2012 she joined the cast of the telenovela Dulce Amor airing in Telefe.

In 2013, Rivero made her film debut in Tesis sobre un homicidio by Hernán Goldfrid. The film was a success, and led the box office for weeks.

== Personal life ==
Rivero lives in New York City and in late 2019 adopted the name Dignity. She practices Gaga dance.

== Filmography ==
=== Films ===
Year	Title	Role	Notes
2013	Tesis sobre un homicidio	Laura Di Natale	Film debut
2019	El sonido de los tulipanes	Carolina	

=== Television ===
Year	Title	Role	TV channel
2006	Usted	Host	Telefe interior
2007	Patito Feo	Emma	El Trece
2008	Casi Ángeles	Juliette	Telefe
2009	Champs 12	Alexia	Canal 9
2010	Alguien que me quiera	Lola Rivera	El Trece
2011	Atrapados	Calu	Yups Channel
2011	El elegido	Erica Linares	Telefe
2012	Dulce Amor	Natacha Bandi	Telefe
2014	Mis amigos de siempre	Tania	El Trece
2019	Campanas en la noche	Luciana Cervantes	Telefe

== Awards ==
=== Nominations ===
- 2013 Martín Fierro Awards
  - Best actress of daily comedy (for Mis amigos de siempre)
