= Thesis on a Homicide =

2013 Argentine-Spanish thriller film

- Theatrical release poster
- Spanish: Tesis sobre un homicidio
- Directed by: Hernán Goldfrid
- Written by: Patricio Vega
- Based on: Tesis sobre un homicidio by Diego Paszkowski
- Produced by: Diego Dubcovsky; Gerardo Herrero
- Starring: Ricardo Darín; Alberto Ammann; Calu Rivero; Arturo Puig
- Cinematography: Rodrigo Pulpeiro
- Edited by: Pablo Barbieri
- Music by: Sergio Moure de Oteyza
- Production companies: Haddock Films; BD Cine; Tornasol Films; Castafiore Films
- Distributed by: Buena Vista International (ar)
- Release dates: 17 January 2013 (Argentina); 5 April 2013 (Spain)
- Running time: 105 minutes
- Countries: Argentina; Spain
- Language: Spanish

Thesis on a Homicide (Spanish: Tesis sobre un homicidio) is a 2013 Argentine-Spanish mystery thriller film directed by Hernán Goldfrid and written by Patricio Vega which stars Ricardo Darín, Alberto Ammann, Arturo Puig and Calu Rivero. It is based on the novel of the same name by Diego Paszkowski.

== Plot ==
Roberto Bermúdez, a criminal law specialist, is convinced that one of his students is a murderer. This initiates an investigation that obsesses him.

== Cast ==
- Ricardo Darín as Roberto Bermúdez
- Alberto Ammann as Gonzalo Ruiz Cordera
- Calu Rivero as Laura Di Natale
- Arturo Puig as Alfredo Hernández
- Fabián Arenillas as Máuregui
- Mara Bestelli as Mónica
- Antonio Ugo as Mario Passalaqua
- José Luis Mazza as Robles
- Mateo Chiarino as Villazán
- Natalia Santiago as Maia Weistein
- Ezequiel de Almeida as Uriarte
- Cecilia Atán as Yolis

== Production ==
An Argentine-Spanish co-production, Thesis on a Homicide was produced by Tornasol Films, BD Cine, Castafiore Films, and Haddock.

== Release ==
The film premiered on 17 January 2013. It was a critical and commercial success, having led the Argentine box office for three consecutive weeks and having reached almost 640,000 spectators (a very good number for Argentina's film revenue standards). It was theatrically released in Spain on 5 April 2013.

== Accolades ==
Year	Award	Category	Nominee(s)	Result	Ref.
2013	8th Sur Awards	Best Film		Nominated	
2013	8th Sur Awards	Best Director	Hernán Goldfrid	Nominated	
2013	8th Sur Awards	Best Actor	Ricardo Darín	Nominated	
2013	8th Sur Awards	Best Adapted Screenplay	Patricio Vega	Nominated	
2013	8th Sur Awards	Best New Actress	Calu Rivero	Nominated	
2013	8th Sur Awards	Best Cinematography	Rodrigo Pulpeiro	Nominated	
2013	8th Sur Awards	Best Costume Design	Julio Suárez	Nominated	
2013	8th Sur Awards	Best Sound	Juan Ferro	Nominated	
2013	8th Sur Awards	Best Original Score	Sergio Moure de Oteyza	Nominated	
2013	8th Sur Awards	Best Editing	Pablo Barbieri	Nominated	
2014	62nd Silver Condor Awards	Best Film		Nominated	
2014	62nd Silver Condor Awards	Best Director	Hernán Goldfrid	Nominated	
2014	62nd Silver Condor Awards	Best Actor	Ricardo Darín	Nominated	
2014	62nd Silver Condor Awards	Best New Actress	Calu Rivero	Nominated	
2014	62nd Silver Condor Awards	Best Adapted Screenplay	Patricio Vega	Nominated	
2014	62nd Silver Condor Awards	Best Cinematography	Rodrigo Pulpeiro	Nominated	
2014	62nd Silver Condor Awards	Best Editing	Pablo Barbieri	Nominated	
2014	62nd Silver Condor Awards	Best Art Direction	Mariela Rípodas	Nominated	
2014	62nd Silver Condor Awards	Best Sound	Diego Garrido, Jesica Suárez, Juan Ferro	Nominated	
2014	62nd Silver Condor Awards	Best Costume Design	Julio Suárez	Nominated	

== See also ==
- List of Argentine films of 2013
- List of Spanish films of 2013
