= The Student (2011 film) =

2011 film

- Directed by: Santiago Mitre
- Written by: Santiago Mitre
- Produced by: Santiago Mitre
- Starring: Valeria Lois
- Release date: 1 September 2011
- Running time: 110 minutes
- Country: Argentina
- Language: Spanish

The Student (Spanish: El estudiante) is a 2011 Argentine drama film written and directed by Santiago Mitre.

The film stars Esteban Lamothe as Roque, a student at the University of Buenos Aires Faculty of Social Sciences who finds himself immersed in the world of student activism.

== Cast ==
- Esteban Lamothe as Roque
- Romina Paula as Paula
- Ricardo Felix as Alberto Acevedo
- Valeria Correa as Valeria
