= The German Friend =

- Directed by: Jeanine Meerapfel
- Starring: Celeste Cid; Max Riemelt; Hartmut Becker; Benjamin Sadler; Jean Pierre Noher; Fernán Mirás; Daniel Fanego; Adriana Aizemberg
- Release date: October 4, 2012
- Running time: 100 minutes
- Countries: Argentina; Germany
- Languages: Spanish; German

The German Friend is a 2012 German-Argentine war romantic drama film directed by Jeanine Meerapfel, and starring Argentine actress Celeste Cid and German actor Max Riemelt. The film premiered on September 18, 2012, at the Argentine GFF (German Film Festival), in Buenos Aires. It tells the story of Sulamit, daughter of Jewish German immigrants, and Friedrich, son of Nazi German immigrants; they meet when they were teenagers in the Buenos Aires of the 1950s. The big political changes in Germany and the National Reorganization Process in Argentina serve as the background for the film.

== Cast ==
- Celeste Cid as Sulamit Löwenstein
- Max Riemelt as Friedrich Burg
- Benjamin Sadler as Michael Tendler
- Hartmut Becker as Herr Werner Kunheim
- Jean Pierre Noher as Philipp Löwenstein
- Fernán Mirás as Professor Durán
- Daniel Fanego as Eduardo
- Adriana Aizemberg as Tante Else
