= Félix Cuadrado Lomas =

Spanish painter (b. 1930, d. 2021)

- Born: December 4, 1930; Valladolid, Spain
- Died: November 17, 2021 (aged 90)

Félix Cuadrado Lomas (Valladolid, Spain, December 4, 1930 - Valladolid, November 17, 2021) was a Spanish painter specialized in Castilian landscapes. In 2017, he declined the Castilla y León Prize for the Arts. He was a member of the artistic group known as Grupo Simancas.

== Biography ==
He was born and raised in the neighborhood of San Andrés in Valladolid. He spent long periods of time in his mother's village, Calzada de los Molinos, in the province of Palencia, where he became familiar with the Castilian rural landscape from a young age. In 1950, as a young man, he retired to Calzada de los Molinos for a year to recover from tuberculosis.

He studied in Valladolid, first at the Jesuit school, then at the Zorrilla Institute, and finally at the School of Arts and Crafts.

Soon, he began to participate in exhibitions and contests and traveled through Spain, Portugal, and France. In 1966, he won the Painting Prize of the Caja de Ahorros Provincial de Valladolid with the painting "Mulas y tierras" (Mules and Lands). From that moment on, he did not participate in any more contests, and all the awards he received were honorary, without him voluntarily submitting or competing.

He collaborated with numerous writers and poets, such as Francisco Pino, Jorge Guillén, Claudio Rodríguez, and Miguel Casado.

Cuadrado Lomas formed the so-called "Grupo Simancas" (1967-2007), alongside other artists from Valladolid, either native or adoptive, such as Gabino Gaona, Domingo Criado, Jorge Vidal (originally from Chile), or Fernando Santiago ("Jacobo"). Other painters, sculptors, ceramists, and writers were also associated with the group or had reciprocal relationships and influences with its members. One such example is Alejandro Conde López, also from Valladolid, stylistically aligned and of the same generation as Cuadrado Lomas or Gaona, with whom he had connections but who first emigrated to Paris and later settled in Madrid. In the brochure of the retrospective dedicated to the "Grupo Simancas" at the Patio Herreriano in 2011, it can be read:

"Different in their formative background, their interests, and even their dedication to painting, this exhibition showcases the work of the six painters who constitute the core of the group. Félix Cuadrado Lomas (1930), charismatic and well-versed in both universal and local pictorial traditions, whether he liked it or not, became the "master" who fostered the formation of the original nucleus of the group. His art, rooted in Cubism, represents the land and tradition. On the other hand, Jorge Vidal (1943-2006) represents an external contribution.

This Chilean artist, who arrived in Valladolid in 1967 and settled permanently in the city in 1976, created a colorful work inserted into the most current debates on pictorial creation. Domingo Criado (1935-2007), a natural communicator both by nature and profession, brought forth an expressionist art filled with emotion, manifested in various media, capable of integrating the best of his environment into a personal poetic expression. Gabino Gaona (1933-2007), an early protagonist of the group alongside Félix Cuadrado Lomas, produced a vitalistic art that evolved from a historicist expressionism to a genuinely contemporary expressionism. Jacobo (1932), the pseudonym and commercial brand by which the painter and gallery owner Fernando Santiago is known, created a work of strong plastic sense, always hindered by his successive entrepreneurial adventures. Finally, the watercolorist and engraver Francisco Sabadell (1922-1971), the oldest in age and trajectory, and prematurely departed, paved the way for the group's activities through his close relationship with the world of poetry and his interest in the landscape."

In 1975, he permanently set up his studio in Simancas.

Félix Cuadrado Lomas died on November 17, 2021.

== Rejection of Castilla y León de las Artes Prize ==
In 2018, the Ministry of Culture of Castilla y León awarded Félix Cuadrado Lomas the Castilla y León Prize for the Arts for the year 2017. However, the painter decided to renounce the award, considering it came too late and lacked an economic endowment. "I asked if they used to provide a monetary reward, and they told me they did, but not for the past five years. So, I asked for the cause and reason, and they said it was due to the economic crisis. However, they are granting subsidies to just anyone for nothing. Where does culture stand here? If they don't have the money, they should eliminate the award, suspend it due to the lack of funds, and they'll be fine. But don't organize an award without any monetary compensation, especially when it used to be there before [...]. Suspend the award, but don't make a fool of yourselves, because then I feel discriminated against. [...] How can I, at 88 years old, accept this award belatedly, this comparative grievance? I'm not interested. Awards don't interest me. I'm not a man of awards or competitions. [...] Why would I want an award that serves no purpose for me? [...] What I can't do at my age is act foolishly."

== Tributes ==
In the town of La Cistérniga, a school is named "Félix Cuadrado Lomas."

== Documentary ==
In 2015, the documentary "Tierras construidas" (Constructed Lands) was filmed about his life and work. The documentary was directed by Arturo Dueñas.

== Bibliography ==
- Santiago Amón: Cuadrado-Lomas, pintor. Caja de Ahorros Provincial de Valladolid, 1983.
