= Aventuras en el mundo del futuro =

Argentinian webcomic

- The cover of the final printed comic
- Story: 81 contributors recognised by Guinness World Records; 3,800 people submitted story suggestions
- Website: http://argentina.aula365.com/aula365/comic

Aventuras en el mundo del futuro (English: Adventures in the World of the Future) is an Argentinian webcomic organized by the educational social network Aula365 Speedy. It received a Guinness World Record in 2011 for "most contributors to a comic book".

This webcomic was produced through Aula365 Speedy, a social learning network and a technological education project launched by Competir and Telefónica. The project to create the webcomic was followed by 200,000 readers. The story consists of 21 chapters, produced over 28 weeks from April to October 2011. The webcomic was also adapted to print: according to a Yahoo report, Guinness officials required it to be printed to qualify for the record and 400,000 copies were printed.

== Participation ==
All those registered on Aula365 were invited to suggest different plot points for each episode. Each week, users voted on the proposals and the ones receiving the most votes became the starting point of the next episode.

There were over 8,000 proposals submitted by 3,800 people on how to continue the different episodes, with contributions coming from 76 different countries and about half coming from children. More than 16,000 votes were cast during the project and suggestions from 80 people were selected.

Founder of Aula365 Pablo Aritizabal described the project as “collaborative intelligence”.

== Guinness world record ==
Adventures in the World of the Future received the Guinness World Record for "most contributors to a comic book". It was declared to have 81 contributors (only submitters whose ideas were included were counted), which broke the previous record held by Kapow! Comic Con, which had 62 authors. The award was presented on 8 November 2011 in Buenos Aires, Argentina to Pablo Aristizabal, founder of Aula365, representing all the users who made this new record possible, and to Andrés Tahta, marketing manager of Speedy.

Aula365's comic no longer holds the record. As of 2019, Guinness World Records identify The Perilous Plights of Peter Pumpkinhead as the most contributors to a comic book, with 141 artists.

== Plot ==
Adventures in the World of the Future begins at a school with one character forgetting about his biology experiment, for which he had been heating a meteorite extract for a week. When he gets to the lab, the experiment has turned into a portal to the future. Children, being curious by nature, enter the portal and find the future looks different. Society is going through a period of ignorance, caused by an evil scientist, who intends to obtain power and domination through fear. Through different adventures, the children find a way to let the rest of the society know about the scientist's plans. With the help of an old acquaintance, they solve the conflict, bringing truth to the world.

The different topics the webcomic dealt with were meant to integrate the fun of reading a webcomic with several school-related topics. Some of those topics are the school in the future, experiments, life in space, food of the future, toys, holidays, communications in the future, clothes, sports, future leaders, and several others intended to set the children's imagination in motion and encourage their collaboration within a moderated online community for different ages.
