= Ludovico Di Santo =

Argentine actor and model

- Born: November 21, 1977 (age 48); Lincoln, Buenos Aires, Argentina
- Education: EFA Actuación
- Occupations: Actor and Model
- Years active: 1998–present
- Partner(s): Úrsula Vargues (2006–2008); Jimena Iglesias (2010–2018)
- Children: Fillippo Di Santo (b. June 7, 2012)

Ludovico Di Santo (born November 21, 1977, in Lincoln, Buenos Aires, Argentina) is an Argentine actor and model.

== Biography ==
Ludovico Di Santo was born on November 21, 1977, at the Sanatorio Anchorena from the City of Buenos Aires, Argentina. At age 6 he went to live with his family in Lincoln, Buenos Aires, Argentina until the age of 18 when he returned to live in the Capital.

== Filmography ==
=== Television ===
Year	Title	Character	Channel
2002	Rebelde Way	Camilo	Canal 9
2004	Frecuencia 04	Jagger Martínez	Telefe
2005	Paraíso rock	Ludovico Robles	Canal 9
2006	El tiempo no para	Lucas Montilla	Canal 9
2007	El Capo	Yamil	Telefe
2007-2008	Julia's tango	Diego	Canal+
2008	Vidas Robadas	Patricio "Pato" Sabatini	Telefe
2008-2009	Atracción x4	Simón Agüero	Canal 13
2010	Alguien que me quiera	Teo Carrasco	Canal 13
2011	El elegido	Octavio Linares Calvo	Telefe
2012-2013	Sos mi hombre	Diego Hernán Jaúregui	Canal 13
2014-2015	Viudas e hijos del Rock and Roll	Ignacio "Nacho" Arostegui	Telefe
2016	La Leona	Álex Arizmendi	Telefe
2016	2091	Mefisto	Fox
2017	Cuéntame cómo pasó	Padre Eugenio	TV Pública
2018	Rizhoma Hotel	Nicolás	Telefe
2018	100 días para enamorarse	Paul Contempomi	Telefe
2020	Separadas	Pedro Moret	Canal 13

=== Theater ===
Year	Title	Director	Theater
2011	Extraños en un tren	Manuel González Gil	Teatro Güemes
2018	Los Tutores	Daniel Cuparo	Paseo La Plaza

=== Movies ===
Year	Movie	Character	Director
2012	Extraños en la noche	Emilio	Alejandro Montiel
2012	Topos	Amadeo	Emiliano Romero
2015	Los Inocentes		Mauricio Brunetti
2016	Operación México, un pacto de amor	Daniel Velasco	Leonardo Bechini
2017	El jardín de la clase media		Ezequiel Inzaghi
2017	Yo soy así, Tita de Buenos Aires	Hugo del Carril	Teresa Costantini

=== Videoclips ===
Year	Artist	Song	Director
2007	Fito Páez	Si es amor	Fernando Rubio

== Awards and nominations ==
Year	Award	Category	Work	Result
2011	Tato Awards	Best Supporting Actor	El elegido	Nominated
2012	Martín Fierro Awards	Best Supporting Actor	Sos mi hombre	Nominated
