= Televisión por la identidad =

- Genre: Drama
- Written by: Marcelo Camaño
- Directed by: Miguel Colom
- Country of origin: Argentina
- Original language: Spanish
- No. of seasons: 1
- No. of episodes: 3

Production
- Producer: Claudio Meilan

Original release
- Network: Telefe
- Release: October 22 – November 5, 2007

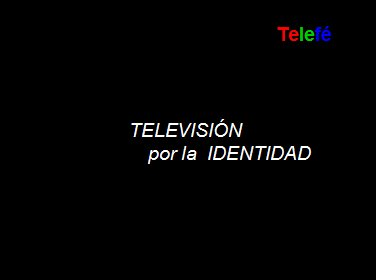
Infographic on the television program

Television for Identity is a three-part Argentine television serial directed by Miguel Colom, written by Marcelo Camaño and produced by Claudio Meilan.

== Cast ==
- Micaela Brusco ... Tatiana
- Celeste Cid ... Julia
- Mariano Torre ... Juan Cabandié
- Leonora Balcarce ... Vanina Falco
- Valentina Bassi ... Esther
- Sofía Elliot ... Tatiana
- Carlos Belloso ... Luis Falco
- Malena Solda ... Mirta Britos
- Betiana Blum ... Grandmother
- Graciela Tenenbaum ... Teresa Falco
- Soledad Villamil ... Inés de Sfiligoy
- Fabio Aste ... Carlos Sfiligoy
- Alberto Fernández de Rosa ... Grandfather
- Lucas Krourer ... Juan
- Lucrecia Capello ... Carmen
- Mario Moscoso .. Juan's uncle
- Claudio Gallardou ... Patapúfete Clown
- Cristina Fridman ... Cristina
