= Martín Seefeld =

Argentine actor (born 1960)

- Born: 20 November 1960 (age 65); Olivos, Vicente López Partido, Buenos Aires, Argentina
- Occupations: Actor, Television Host, Television Producer and Radio Host
- Years active: 1993-present
- Spouses: Raquel Mancini (m. 1984; div. 1989) Valeria Giuliani (m. 1990)
- Children: Lola Seefeld (b. 2003); Pedro Seefeld (b. 2005)

Martín Seefeld (born 20 November 1960 in Olivos, Vicente López Partido, Buenos Aires, Argentina) is an Argentine actor, television host, television producer and radio host.

== Biography ==
Martín Seefeld was born on 20 November 1960 in Olivos, Vicente López Partido, Buenos Aires, Argentina and grew up in the Buenos Aires neighborhood of Don Torcuato, Buenos Aires, Argentina. Martín Seefeld started studying theater at the age of 20. At 29 he started working in the manufacture of leather jackets and the organization of events. He was born to a Catholic mother and a Jewish father and identifies as Jewish.

== Personal life ==
In the year 1984, Martín Seefeld married the model and actress, Raquel Mancini. The couple divorced in the year 1989. Martín Seefeld and Valeria Giuliani met in 1989 when he was 29 years old and she 22 years old. In the year 1990, Martín Seefeld married Valeria Giuliani. In 2003, the couple's first child, a girl, was born whom, they called Lola Seefeld. In 2005, the couple's second child, a boy, was born whom, they called Pedro Seefeld.

In 1994, he lost a close friend in the AMIA bombing, a terror attack on the Jewish Community Centre in Buenos Aires.

== Filmography ==
=== Television ===
Year	Title	Character	Channel
1993-1996	Mi cuñado	Friend	Telefe
1995	Montaña Rusa	Daniel	Canal 13
1995-1996	Poliladron	Néstor Córdoba	Canal 13
1997	Naranja y media	Sergio	Telefe
1997	Carola Casini	Gregorio	Canal 13
1997	Laberinto	Doctor	Canal 13
1998	Alas, poder y pasión	Maximiliano Ponti	Canal 13
1998	Gasoleros	Martín	Canal 13
2000	Primicias	Judge Barrera	Canal 13
2001	El sodero de mi vida	Marcelo Rodríguez	Canal 13
2001	Tiempo final		Telefe
2002-2003	Los simuladores	Gabriel Medina	Telefe
2002-2003	Rebelde Way	Franco Colucci	Canal 9/América TV
2004	Frecuencia 04	Gustavo	Telefe
2004	De la cama al living		TV Pública
2005	Hombres de honor	Alejandro Sambonini	Canal 13
2005	El Patrón de la Vereda	Bernardo Bernasconi	América TV
2005-2008	Mujeres asesinas		Canal 13
2006	Amas de casa desesperadas	Carlos Solís	Canal 13
2007	Son de Fierro	Juan Cruz Zorrilla	Canal 13
2008	Socias	Álvaro Cárdenas	Canal 13
2008	Oportunidades	Dr. Ameghino	Canal 13
2009	Dromo		América TV
2009-2010	Herencia de amor	Father Miguel	Telefe
2010	Le due facce dell'amore	Cardona	RAI
2011	El elegido	Santiago Mercado	Telefe
2012-2013	Mi amor, mi amor	Omar Estrella	Telefe
2014	La celebración	Nacho	Telefe
2014	Mis amigos de siempre	Oscar Pires	Canal 13
2016	La Leona	Coco Zanneti	Telefe
2017	Las Estrellas (telenovela)	Fernán Kowacksinsky	Canal 13
2017	Cuéntame cómo pasó	Carlos Martínez Pérez (Adult voice)	TV Pública
2018	Yo, Potro	Darío Romani	Netflix
2019	Monzón	El Negro	Space
2023	Familia de Diván	Mario	Flow

https://www.infobae.com/que-puedo-ver/2024/09/16/en-que-consiste-la-serie-que-conquisto-a-millones-y-se-llevo-un-martin-fierro/

=== Movies ===
Year	Movie	Character	Director
1993	Las boludas		Víctor Dínenzon
1998	Tango	Andrés Castro	Carlos Saura
2002	Nowhere	Espinoza	Luis Sepúlveda
2003	Un día en el paraíso	Nacho	Juan Bautista Stagnaro
2007	Cartas para Jenny	Sergio	Diego Musiak
2009	Despertar	Humberto	André Doria
2010	El Dedo	Baldomero	Sergio Teubal

=== Theater ===
Year	Title	Character
1996	Poliladron	Néstor Córdoba
1998	Fiel	
2000	El bilingüe	
2002	Desaforados	
2003	Absolutamente natural	
2004	De guante blanco	
2005-2007	El método Grönholm	
2008	Codicia	
2019	Departamento de soltero	

=== Television programs ===
Year	Program	Channel	Notes
2005	Enfrentados	América TV	Host
2014-2015	El mundo nos mira	Canal de la Ciudad	Host
2018	Todos somos uno	TV Pública	Host
