= Celeste Cid =

Argentine actress (born 1984)

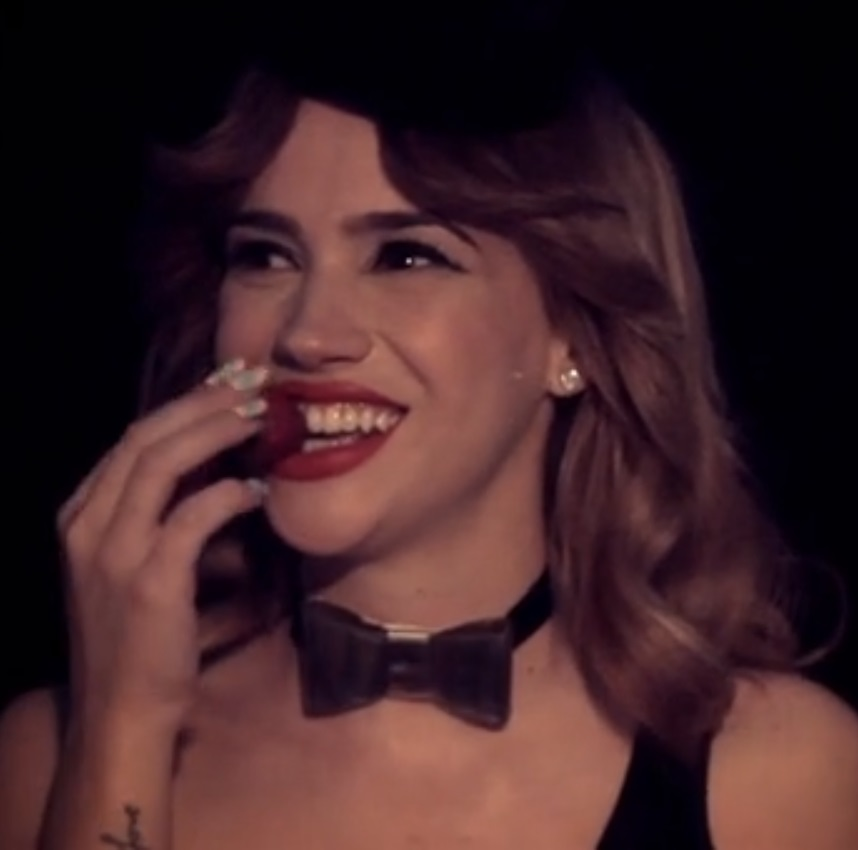
- Cid in 2014
- Born: María Celeste Cid; 19 January 1984 (age 42); San Cristóbal, Buenos Aires, Argentina
- Occupation: Actress
- Years active: 1997–present
- Partners: Nicolás Cabré (2001–2003); Emmanuel Horvilleur (2003–2006); Luis Ortega (2006–2008); Michel Noher (2016–2018)
- Children: 2

María Celeste Cid (born 19 January 1984) is an Argentine telenovela actress.

== Early life ==
María Celeste Cid was born on January 19, 1984, and grew up in the San Cristóbal neighborhood of the City of Buenos Aires.

== Career ==
Her acting career began at thirteen when her aunt took her to a casting for the children's strip Chiquititas. After having also participated in Verano del '98, Celeste received the offer for her first protagonist, along with Emanuel Ortega at EnAmorArte. In 2002, she was part of the soap opera Franco Buenaventura, el profe, headed by Osvaldo Laport. There she played a young student who ended up having a relationship with her teacher. In 2003, she played Julia Malaguer Podestá in Resistiré where she shared a leading role with Pablo Echarri. That year she also participated in the "Asesíname" video clip by Charly García. Then, she participated in some episodes of the unitary Pol-ka Locas de amor and in 2005 she returned to the small screen as the protagonist of the unit, Ambiciones, on the Telefe screen. During the course of that year, she performed in classical theater in the Greek tragedy Hipólito and Fedra. Between 2006 and 2007 she had sporadic television stakes in unitarians Mujeres asesinas, Televisión por la identidad and Mujeres elefantes. She debuted as director in the short film Limbo, released in 2008. In 2008, she starred in her first feature film, Motivos para no enamorarse, with Jorge Marrale. Later she returned to the small screen as the protagonist of the mini interactive series Dirigime - La Venganza that was transmitted through the Terra Networks portal. In this the viewers look at the chapters according to the character they choose, and at the end of each broadcast they vote on the best ending for the story. The series was also broadcast on América TV. In 2009, she starred in Eva & Lola directed by the filmmaker Sabrina Farji. In 2010, she returned to television as one of the protagonists of Para vestir santos for Canal 13. In 2011 she left her role in the TV Soap Lobo due to illness.

Later she traveled to Europe to star in the Argentine-German production The German Friend. In August 2012, she starred with Luciano Castro on the soap opera Sos mi hombre, broadcast on the screen of Canal 13, which remained on the air until mid-2013. During 2014, Celeste starred in the film Aire Libre, alongside Leonardo Sbaraglia and under the orders of Anahí Berneri. On television he played Vera Santoro in Viudas e hijos del Rock & Roll on the Telefe screen. In 2015, she starred in the film La parte ausente, by Gabriel Maidana, along with Alberto Ajaka. In 2017, she starred in the series Las Estrellas (telenovela) aired on Canal 13 together with Marcela Kloosterboer, Violeta Urtizberea, Natalie Pérez and Justina Bustos. The series premiered on May 29, 2017, and ended on January 23, 2018.

== Personal life ==
Cid has discussed she has an addiction problem and was in rehabilitation between 2010 and 2011. She blamed her workload as a teenager.

Cid has said she has been a victim of a stalker for more than 20 years, since she was 15. A man used to send her presents and letters and once tried to approach her in Uruguay.

== Filmography ==
=== Television ===
Year	Title	Character	Channel
1997-1998	Chiquititas	Bárbara "Barbarita" Ramírez	Telefe
1999-2000	Verano del '98	Yoko Vázquez	Telefe
2001	EnAmorArte	Celeste Serrano/Celeste Miguens	Telefe
2002	Franco Buenaventura, el profe	Carolina Peña	Telefe
2003	Resistiré	Julia Malaguer Podestá	Telefe
2004	El Deseo	Cartonera	Telefe
2004	Locas de amor	Zara Ohañak	Canal 13
2005	Botines	Jazmín	Canal 13
2005	Conflictos en red	Florencia	Telefe
2005	Ambiciones	Nina Cárdenas	Telefe
2006	Mujeres asesinas	Lucía/Cecilia/Ramona	Canal 13
2007	Televisión por la identidad	Julia	Telefe
2008	Mujeres asesinas	Victoria	Canal 13
2008	Fundación Huésped: Oportunidades	Nora	Canal 13
2009	Dirigime: la venganza	Laura	América TV
2010	Para vestir santos	Malena San Juan	Canal 13
2011	Contra las cuerdas	Juana	TV Pública
2011	El puntero	Guillermina Ruiz	Canal 13
2012-2013	Sos mi hombre	Camila Garay	Canal 13
2014-2015	Viudas e hijos del Rock & Roll	Vera Santoro/Vera Bettini	Telefe
2016	Si solo si	Berenice	TV Pública
2017-2018	Las Estrellas (telenovela)	Virginia Estrella	Canal 13
2018	Pasado de Copas: Drunk History	Ava Gardner	Telefe
2019	Otros pecados	Lola	Canal 13
2019	Monzón	Susana Giménez	Space
2019	El host	Female ghost	Fox
2020	Separadas	Martina Soria/Martina Rivero	Canal 13
2021	Planners	Malena	Star+

=== Movies ===
Year	Movie	Character	Director
2008	Motivos para no enamorarse	Clara	Mariano Mucci
2010	Eva & Lola	Eva	Sabrina Farji
2012	The German Friend	Sulamit Löwenstein	Jeanine Meerapfel
2014	Aire libre	Lucía	Anahí Berneri
2015	La parte ausente	Lucrecia	Galel Maidana
2016	Artax: Un nuevo Comienzo	Mariana	Diego Corsini
2020	Hasta el cielo ida y vuelta		Sebastián Pivotto

== Videoclips ==
Year	Artist	Song	Director
2003	Charly García	Asesíname	
2016	Mex Urtizberea	Mua	
2018	Martina Stoessel and Cali y El Dandee	Por Que Te Vas	
2019	Meteoros and Emmanuel Horvilleur	Chica en Buenos Aires	

== Discography ==
- 1997 — Chiquititas Vol. 3
- 1998 — Chiquititas Vol. 4

== Awards and nominations ==
Year	Award	Category	Work	Result
2002	Martín Fierro Awards	Best Actress Novel Star	Franco Buenaventura, el profe	Nominated
2002	INTE Award	Best Youth Talent in Latin America	Franco Buenaventura, el profe	Winner
2003	INTE Award	Latin American Actress of the Year	Resistiré	Nominated
2005	ACE Awards	Female Revelation	Hipólito y Fedra	Nominated
2008	Bafici	Best short film, script and direction	Limbo	Nominated
2009	Málaga International Film Festival	High interpretive quality	Motivos para no enamorarse	Winner
2010	Martín Fierro Awards	Best Actress Miniseries Star	Para vestir santos	Nominated
2011	Seoul International Drama Award	Best Actress	Para vestir santos	Nominated
2011	Festival du Cinema Sud Americain en Marsella	Best Actress	Eva y Lola	Winner
2012	Tato Awards	Best Novel Actress	Sos mi hombre	Nominated
2012	Martín Fierro Awards	Best Leading Actress in Daily Fiction	Sos mi hombre	Nominated
2013	Silver Condor Awards	Best Actress	The German Friend	Nominated
2013	El Festival Internacional de Cine de Punta del Este 16ª edición	Special mention for participation in a movie	The German Friend	Winner
2015	Silver Condor Awards	Best Leading Actress	Aire libre	Nominated
2015	Kids Choice Awards Argentina	Favorite Actress	Viudas e hijos del Rock & Roll	Nominated
2017	Tato Awards	Best Leading Actress in Daily Fiction	Las Estrellas (telenovela)	Nominated

== See also ==
- List of Argentines
