= Chiquititas (Portuguese TV series) =

- Genre: Telenovela
- Created by: Cris Morena
- Developed by: Cristina Araújo; Antônio B. Correia; Teresa Guilherme
- Written by: Walter Ferreira Ramos; Delia Maunas; Ana Morgado; João Matos; Mafalda Ferreira; Raquel Shefer
- Directed by: Vítor Jesus; Sandra Antunes
- Starring: Marta Fernandes; Nuno Pardal; Luís Mascarenhas; Luís Gaspar; Patrícia Tavares; Sofia de Portugal; Cátia Tavares; César Brito; Catarina Rebelo and Carlos Vieira
- Opening theme: "O Mundo Das Chiquititas" ("Chiquititas 2006")
- Country of origin: Portugal
- Original language: Portuguese
- No. of seasons: 1
- No. of episodes: 217

Production
- Producers: Teresa Guilherme; Attílio Ricco
- Running time: 45 minutes
- Production companies: Cris Morena Group; RGB Entertainment

Original release
- Network: SIC
- Release: July 20, 2007

Related
- Chiquititas sin fin

Chiquititas is a 2007 Portuguese telenovela, produced by Teresa Guilherme Produções and an adaptation of the Argentine series Chiquititas sin fin. Premiered in June 2007, the show starred actress Marta Fernandes as the iconic character of Lili, an eccentric woman who guides a group of orphans while they struggle in the Do Monte Orphanage, filling their lives with joy and hope, while in the search for her lost son. Actors Nuno Pardal, Carlos Vieira, Luís Gaspar and Patrícia Tavares also star.

== Plot ==
Madalena Santana is a cold hearted, strict and busy young woman who got pregnant in the past and, after revealing it to her father Vítor, was sent to an abandoned place. Her son was taken by the Garcia's servant, under Vítor's orders, to an orphanage, and she forced to lie by saying to Madalena that her little child was stillborn. Repentant, the servant then told Madalena the truth, which made daughter hate father since then. Madalena started looking for her child, and was sure that the kid lives inside the Do Monte Orphanage. She goes there under a new identity: with the help of her best friend Catarina, she assumes the role of an adorable and somewhat crazy woman, the sweethearted Lili. Under this alter ego, she ends up on a maternal figure to the orphans of the place, appearing as a Madalena's distant cousin. Beyond them, Lili meets Laidinha, the arrogant housekeeper who is seen by the kids as an "evil witch", the orphanage's owners Júlia and Pierre De Mont, and their little spoiled children, Marcel and Alice. The De Monts are an ambitious, greedy and perverse family aspiring for money. Lucas is the handsome, sympathetic and adorable chef of the orphanage, and he and Lily soon fall in love for each other. They both take care of Anita, Zeca, Susto, Bocas, Chico, Minorca, Kiki, Vanda, Paula and Lua (the youngest of them). Lili gradually changes the lives of the chiquititas, while she is sure that one of them is her lost son.

== Production ==
Chiquititas was the second Cris Morena production adapted by SIC, following the success obtained by Floribella. Before its release, the series was compared by producers to Mary Poppins, and developed a large licensed merchandise invested for the audience (as done by Floribella). Since the series finale was in September 2008, the ending had to be changed from the original one (in which the characters celebrate Christmas) to a Love-themed party.

== Chiquititas: The Magical Journey (cancelled game) ==
Chiquititas: The Magical Journey was meant to be a fantasy-action 2009 game based on this show, produced by Biodroid Productions and distributed by Emergent. It was meant to release on the PS2 and Wii, the game provides two playable characters from the show, Lily and Kili, exploring levels and fighting against enemies. The game was quietly cancelled.

== Soundtracks ==
In addition to 24 Horas, Chiquititas also had a second album entitled Viva A Vida, with Portuguese versions of songs from the Chiquititas soundtracks unused in Chiquititas Sin Fin. 24 Horas was among the Portugal Albums Top 30 in first place for seven weeks.

=== 24 Horas ===
24 Horas

Soundtrack album by Marta Fernandes and the cast of Chiquititas
- Released: 2007
- Genre: Pop
- Length: 43:31 (Minutes)
- Producer: Miguel Dias

Marta Fernandes and the cast of Chiquititas chronology
''24 Horas'' (2007)	Viva A Vida (2008)

Track listing

1. "Chiquititas 2006" ("Chiquititas 2006")
2. "Coração Com Buraquinhos" ("Corazón Con Agujeritos") feat. Beatriz Monteiro
3. "Tudo Tudo Tudo" ("Todo Todo")
4. "Juntos Podemos Voar" ("Volar Mejor")
5. "24 Horas" ("24 Horas")
6. "Louco Por Ti" ("Estoy Loco") feat. Miguel Dias
7. "Mentiras" ("Mentiritas")
8. "Há Certas Coisas" ("Me Pasan Cosas") feat. Cátia Tavares
9. "Malvada" ("Malissima") feat. Sofia de Portugal
10. "Onde Estás" ("Donde Estás")
11. "Amigas" ("Amigas")
12. "Era Uma Vez" ("Había Una Vez")
13. "Eu Quero Ser Igual ("Igual A Los Demás")

==== Notes ====
Producer Miguel Dias, who adapted the themes from Spanish to Portuguese, sings alongside Marta Fernandes in the songs featuring the character of Lucas the Chef. The main title theme is incorrectly listed as "Chiquititas 2006" (the original title of the song), although it is better known as "O Mundo Das Chiquititas".
