= Los creadores =

- Genre: Animated children's television series
- Created by: Pablo Aristizabal
- Written by: Pablo Aristizabal; Florencio Nocetti; Esteban Garrido
- Starring: Fabio Aste; Héctor Segura
- Country of origin: Argentina
- Original languages: Spanish, English, Portuguese
- No. of seasons: Two
- No. of episodes: 26

Production
- Running time: 24 minutes

Los Creadores (English: The Creators) is an Argentine children's television series, aired by Telefe between 2015 and 2016.

In 2016, the series began to be broadcast by Netflix for the whole of Americas in Spanish, English and Portuguese.

In 2016 and 2017, Los Creadores began broadcasting on Señal Colombia, at 9 am every weekend.

The programme was created by Pablo Aristizabal, executive director of the pedagogical media company «Competir». The series was made by A365 Studios and produced by Pol-ka Productions.

It is the first Argentine animated series that combined 3D and real images, allowing viewers to interact simultaneously between television and the web. The animated characters come from the Aula365, Creapolis and Kids News transmedia of the Argentinean company Competir, that work with innovative educational contents for children since 2007.

The story takes place in two worlds: the physical and the virtual, where different characters coexist : Real actors and 3D animated characters. It is a proposal with an audiovisual content that expands through the different technological platforms in a parallel and complementary way, with narrative games, applications, experiments, choreographies and interacting with the virtual world of Creápolis, the city of the creators.

== Awards ==
- 2015 Martín Fierro Awards
  - Best children program
- 2016 Premio Tato
  - Best children program
- 2015 Honorable Camara de diputados de la Nacion Argentina
  - Distinguished Creators as a program of cultural and educational interest
- 2015 WSA- ONU
  - Best Digital Innovation with high impact on society
