= Simancas Group =

Spanish artist collective (1967–2007)

The Simancas Group (1967–2007) was a collective of Spanish painters of Valladolid origin who established their workshops in the town of Simancas (Valladolid). The group of artists and intellectuals created a dynamic working together, with mutual influences in Valladolid during the 1960s and 1970s, expanding the horizons of local culture.

== History of the group ==
In the gallery that Fernando Santiago ("Jacobo") (1932–2017):.. had in Valladolid, at 2 Miguel Íscar Street, an activity of exhibitions and gatherings began in 1965. An eclectic group of friends with different approaches and dedications to painting would meet there, and later, from 1972, they established themselves in Simancas. There, Fernando Santiago himself bought some spaces to move the activity, which revolved around Fernando Santiago, Félix Cuadrado Lomas (1930–2021), Gabino Gaona (1933–2007), Jorge Vidal (1943–2006), Domingo Criado (1935–2007), and Francisco Sabadell (1922–1971). A journalist, Emilio Salcedo, would give the group the name of this locality. Fernando Gutiérrez Baños, curator of the 2011 retrospective, points out that "There was never a closed group or a registry book with a specific ideology, although their essence can be summarized in those six [artists]."

Other painters, sculptors, ceramists, and writers were also associated with the group or had reciprocal relationships and influences with its members. One such example is Alejandro Conde López, also from Valladolid, stylistically aligned and from the same generation as Cuadrado Lomas or Gaona, who exhibited at Fernando Santiago's gallery but later emigrated to Paris and settled in Madrid. Another figure is Carlos León Escudero, who was very young at that time and began his career under the group's protection

The Simancas Group practically disappeared with the deaths of three of its members in a short period (Vidal, Gaona, and Criado).

== Styles ==
The six core painters of the group had different backgrounds, dedications, styles, and concerns, but they maintained a close relationship for years. Félix Cuadrado Lomas was influenced by Cubism, with landscapes as a recurring theme and a calculated use of color. Jorge Vidal, a Chilean artist who arrived in Valladolid in 1967, developed a body of work characterized by striking colorful abstraction. Domingo Criado's abstract painting was expressive and emotive. Gabino Gaona also painted in an expressive and colorful style, often portraying the Castilian landscape, which he shared with the group and particularly connected him to Cuadrado Lomas. Francisco Sabadell, the oldest of the group and the first to pass away, focused his painting on landscapes and bridged the group with the world of poetry. Lastly, the artist and gallery owner Fernando Santiago "Jacobo" provided the spaces where the group's activities took place and developed his own work in which, once again, landscapes and color, perhaps the leitmotifs of the group, were prominent themes

== Influences ==
In the paintings of the group, there are influences that span a wide spectrum, starting with the avant-gardes of the early 20th century and the École de Paris. Traces of Fauvism, Cubism, German and Viennese Expressionism, and American Abstract Expressionism can be detected. As pointed out in the brochure for the exhibition at the Museo Patio Herreriano in 2011:

"... the Simancas Group was, above all, a group of friends without a defined aesthetic approach beyond a commitment to innovative art that led its members to explore different languages of modernity. At times, they embraced more contemporary styles, while at other times, they drew inspiration from the venerable tradition of historical avant-gardes."

== Works ==
In the late retrospective of 2011, when some of its members had already died, a total of 72 paintings were on display, which are now housed in public and private collections.

== Bibliography ==
- Ramón Torío (2010): Retrato de familia (autobiografía del Grupo Simancas), Ed. Fuente de la Fama (Diputación de Valladolid). ISBN 978-84-614-0142-0
- Fernando Gutiérrez Baños (2011): Grupo Simancas: paisaje, color, expresión, Fundación Villalar-Castilla y León (Patio Herreriano, Museo de Arte Contemporáneo Español). ISBN 978-84-96286-17-7, ISBN 978-84-937120-9-9.

== See also ==
Museo de Arte Abstracto Español
