= Campanas en la noche =

Argentine Telenovela

- Genre: Telenovela
- Created by: Lily Ann Martin; Jessica Valls
- Written by: Lily Ann Martin; Jessica Valls; Renato D´Angelo; Juan José Ciuffo
- Starring: Esteban Lamothe; Calu Rivero; Federico Amador
- Theme music composer: Ricardo Montaner
- Opening theme: «¿Qué vas a hacer?»
- Country of origin: Argentina
- Original language: Spanish
- No. of seasons: 1
- No. of episodes: 80

Production
- Executive producer: Manuel Garriga
- Production location: Buenos Aires
- Running time: 35–45 minutes
- Production company: Viacom International Studios

Original release
- Network: Telefe
- Release: January 14 – May 15, 2019

Related
- Golpe al corazón; Pequeña Victoria

Campanas en la noche (English: Bells at Night) is a 2019 Argentine telenovela created by Lily Ann Martin and Jessica Valls for Telefe. It premiered on January 14, 2019 and ended on May 15, 2019. It stars Esteban Lamothe, Calu Rivero and Federico Amador. The supporting cast includes Eugenia Tobal, Rodrigo Guirao Díaz, Patricia Viggiano, Mariano Argento, Adrián Navarro, Martín Slipak, Laura Laprida, Clara Alonso, Franco Masini, Azul Fernández, and Bárbara Amaral. There is also the special participation of Héctor Bidonde, Jean Pierre Noher, and Noemí Frenkel.

== Plot ==
In 2004, Luis Rolón (Federico Amador) is living a quiet life with his partner, Iracema (Lola Banfi) and their baby daughter, Bruna, in a small town in Patagonia called Lago Místico. One day, Luis comes home to find Iracema bleeding on the floor. Before she dies in his arms, Iracema tells Luis it was her abusive ex-boyfriend who stabbed her. Iracema had suffered years of abuse at the hands of her ex-boyfriend, Vito Paternó (Esteban Lamothe). She had escaped from Buenos Aires to Lago Místico after finding out she was pregnant with Bruna, without telling Vito about her pregnancy. Iracema later met Luis, who agreed to raise the baby as his own. Iracema never wanted to talk about her past and barely told Luis anything about Vito. Vito had tracked Iracema down and murdered her after she refused to get back together with him.

Luis panics that he will be charged with Iracema's murder so he escapes Lago Místico with Bruna in tow. A young woman named Luciana Cervantes (Calu Rivero) sees him flee and is horrified to find Iracema's body, which leads her to meet Vito. Luis ends up in Buenos Aires, where he adopts the new identity of Omar Pereyra and remakes his life.

Fourteen years later, Omar (formerly Luis) works as a carpenter and lives with a now-teenage Bruna (Azul Fernández) in a boarding house, surrounded by several tenants. Omar decides to fulfill an old promise he made to Bruna: finish high school. At the night school he attends, Omar re-encounters Luciana, who recognizes him from all those years ago. Omar's past, which he thought he had escaped, comes back to haunt him and he finally has to clear his name. Luciana believes in his innocence and decides to help him. Luciana and Omar fall in love, but they have a major obstacle: Vito, who is now in a relationship with Luciana and refuses to let her go. Omar's longtime friend and attorney, Griselda Ramos (Eugenia Tobal), who has always been in love with him, works with Vito to keep Omar and Luciana apart

Luciana and Omar start a relationship, but their happiness is cut short when they are torn apart by a scheme orchestrated by Vito and Griselda. Although their love for each other is evident, Luciana and Omar continue to be separated time and time again by Vito and Griselda's constant manipulations. Omar starts a relationship with Griselda out of guilt after she tried to take her own life when he told her he was in love with Luciana and not with her. Luciana gets engaged to Vito, much to Omar's disappointment.

Luciana finds out about Vito's manipulations and when she goes to confront him, she sees him in the throes of passion with her own mother, María Marta (Patricia Viggiano), thus finding out they were lovers, making Luciana finally realize what kind of man Vito is. Luciana then reunites with Omar and they make love for the first time in the house Omar is building. Vito sees them together and sets the house on fire out of jealously. Griselda pulls Omar out of the fire and Omar rescues Luciana. These series of events causes the truth about Vito murdering Iracema to finally come out.

Now more empowered than ever, Luciana decides to help Omar, his police officer friend José (Rodrigo Guirao Díaz), and Iracema's sister, Rita (Bárbara Amaral), bring Vito to justice. Luciana continues her relationship with Vito in order to gather evidence against him. After Vito attempts to rape Luciana, she reveals that she knows he is Iracema's murderer and runs off, traumatized by the assault. To get Omar to tell him where Luciana is, Vito kidnaps Bruna. When Vito is about to kill Bruna, Omar has no choice but to reveal to Vito that Bruna is his biological daughter. Vito is furious that Omar not only "stole" two women he loved, but his daughter, too. Omar and Vito have a violent confrontation on a boat, where Omar hits Vito and he falls into the water. Omar is arrested and jailed for Vito's alleged "murder", but he is actually still alive. Luciana returns and reveals she is pregnant. Vito kidnaps Luciana and tries to flee the country, but fails and is finally arrested for Iracema's murder.

Everything culminates when Vito is kidnapped by Rita and cult leader, Nelson Amarante (Adrián Navarro). Before the pair can kill Vito, José and Omar stop them. Vito then kidnaps Omar and tries to kill him, but Luciana arrives just in time to save him. Vito is about to murder Luciana and Omar, when Griselda arrives and kills him. Immediately after, Griselda throws herself out of a window and falls to her death.

A while later, Luciana, Omar, Bruna, and Juani (Franco Masini), who is Bruna's boyfriend and Luciana's nephew, all move to Lago Místico. Luciana and Omar welcome their baby boy. They are finally free of the obstacles that kept them apart and can finally live happily ever after.

== Cast ==
=== Protagonists ===
- Esteban Lamothe as Vito Paternó. Businessman. Boyfriend of Luciana, son of Lidia and Horacio, biological son of Enrico, half-brother of Alejandro. Murdered his ex-girlfriend Iracema and is the biological father of her daughter, Bruna. Has affairs with María Marta and Micaela. Murdered by Griselda.
- Calu Rivero as Luciana Cervantes. Photographer/night school teacher. Girlfriend of Vito, daughter of María Marta and Flavio, sister of Florencia, aunt of Juani. In love with Omar.
- Federico Amador as Omar Pereyra/Luis Rolón. Carpenter. Adoptive father of Bruna, grandson of Damián. Accused of murdering his partner, Iracema. In love with Luciana.

=== Supporting cast ===
- Rodrigo Guirao Díaz as José Carabajal. Police officer investigating Iracema's murder. His wife and daughter were killed in a car accident. Becomes friends with Omar. In love with Rita.
- Adrián Navarro as Nelson Amarante. Leader of the bumbaísta cult. João's father, Sonia's ex-husband, Gabriel's brother. Manipulates Rita into his cult. Killed by gangsters of Vito.
- Clara Alonso as Florencia "Flor" Cervantes. Luciana's sister, Juani's mother, Pablo's ex-wife.
- Mariano Argento as Flavio Cervantes. Businessman. Husband of María Marta, father of Luciana and Florencia, lover of Gonzalo. He commits suicide after accidentally killing Gonzalo.
- Eugenia Tobal as Griselda Ramos. Lawyer. Omar's friend who is in love with him. Works with Vito to separate him from Luciana. Murders Yanina, Vito, and her husband, the "real" Omar Pereyra. She commits suicide after all of her wrongdoings.
- Franco Masini as Juan Ignacio "Juani" Ballesteros. Pablo and Florencia's son, Luciana's nephew. Had a son with Emilia who was put up for adoption. In love with Bruna.
- Patricia Viggiano as María Marta Cervantes. Businesswoman. Wife of Flavio, mother of Luciana and Florencia, Vito and Enrico's lover.
- Martín Slipak as Alejandro Heredia. Illegitimate son of Horacio Paternó, half-brother of Vito, husband of Micaela, father of Abril. Murders Micaela and Enrico. Does all of Vito's bidding. Ends up in prison.
- Azul Fernández as Bruna Rolón/Pereyra. Vito and Iracema's daughter who was raised by Omar. In love with Juani, also dates João.
- Laura Laprida as Micaela Valente. Alejandro's wife, mother of Abril. Has an affair with Vito. Murdered by Alejandro.
- Mimí Ardú as Guadalupe Iraola. Owner of the boarding house where Omar and Bruna live.
- Diego Gentile as Pablo Ballesteros. Juani's father, Florencia's ex-husband.
- Romina Moretto as Susana Renzi. The director of the night school.
- Dalma Maradona as Sharon Tejedor/Jimena Tejedor. Sharon is a night school student who tries to find her missing identical twin sister, Jimena. Jimena was also a night school student. She disappeared and was later found murdered. She was killed by Felipe.
- Nicolás García as Wilmer Muñoz. One of the students at the night school.
- Eugenia Guerty as Jorgelina "La Jorgita" Gómez. One of the tenants of the boarding house.
- Germán de Silva as Raúl Mastandrea. Night school student who lives in the boarding house.
- Máximo Ghione as Tony. Griselda's ex-boyfriend.
- Bárbara Amaral as Rita del Valle. Originally from Brazil. Younger sister of Iracema, aunt of Bruna. Wants justice for Iracema's murder. Becomes involved with Nelson's cult. In love with José.

=== Special participation ===
- Jean Pierre Noher as Enrico Ferrara. Godfather and biological father of Vito. Former lover of Lidia. Has a fling with María Marta. Murdered by Alejandro.
- Héctor Bidonde as Damián Rolón. Omar's grandfather. Dies of a heart attack.
- Noemí Frenkel as Lidia Villegas. Vito's mother, Horacio's widow, Enrico's former lover. Was institutionalized by Vito for many years because she was the only one who knew he murdered Iracema.

=== Minor appearances ===
- César Bordón as Bartolomé Navarro. Vito's lawyer.
- Esteban Pérez as Gonzalo Hernández. Lawyer. Flavio's lover. Accidentally killed by Flavio.
- Thomas Lepera as João Amarante. Son of Nelson and Sonia. In love with Bruna.
- Federico Salles as Gabriel Amarante. Nelson's brother. Killed by Vito's gangsters.
- William Prociuk as Omar Pereyra. Griselda's husband who she believed died after being in a coma for years. Dies after being poisoned by Griselda.
- Lola Banfi as Iracema del Valle. Deceased; seen in flashbacks. Originally from Brazil. Vito's ex-girlfriend, Omar's partner, Rita's older sister, Bruna's mother. Killed by Vito.
- Gabriel Fernández as Norberto Estrada. Vito's ally. Framed for Iracema's murder. Killed by gangsters of Vito.
- Ailin Zaninovich as Yanina Gauna. Sharon's friend. Prostitute hired by Vito, who attacks her. Murdered by Griselda after she discovers she is working with Vito.
- Matías Barki as Jonatan "El Chori" Pedrozo. Omar's cellmate when he is jailed for the alleged death of Vito.
- Rito Fernández as Mono Garay. Inmate in the prison where Omar is transferred. Murdered by Jonatan "El Chori".
- Rubén Stella as Saldaña. Corrupt commissioner in Lago Místico allied with Vito. Murdered by José.
- Patricio Aramburu as Felipe. History teacher at the night school. Murdered Jimena when she turned down his advances.
- Camila Pizzo as Emilia. Juani's ex-girlfriend; they had a son who was given up for adoption.
- Eliseo Barrionuevo as Osky. Former drug addict. Luciana's ex-boyfriend.
- Alejandro Zanga as Tula, drug dealer ally with Vito. Murdered by him.
- Laurentino Blanco and Fausto Labraña as El Bicho and Willy, two criminals hired by Vito to kidnap Luciana. Both are murdered by him.
- Cala Zavaleta as Lau. Friend of Vito and Luciana.
- Diego Faturos as Lalo. Friend of Vito and Luciana.
