= Lalo Mir =

Argentine radio host

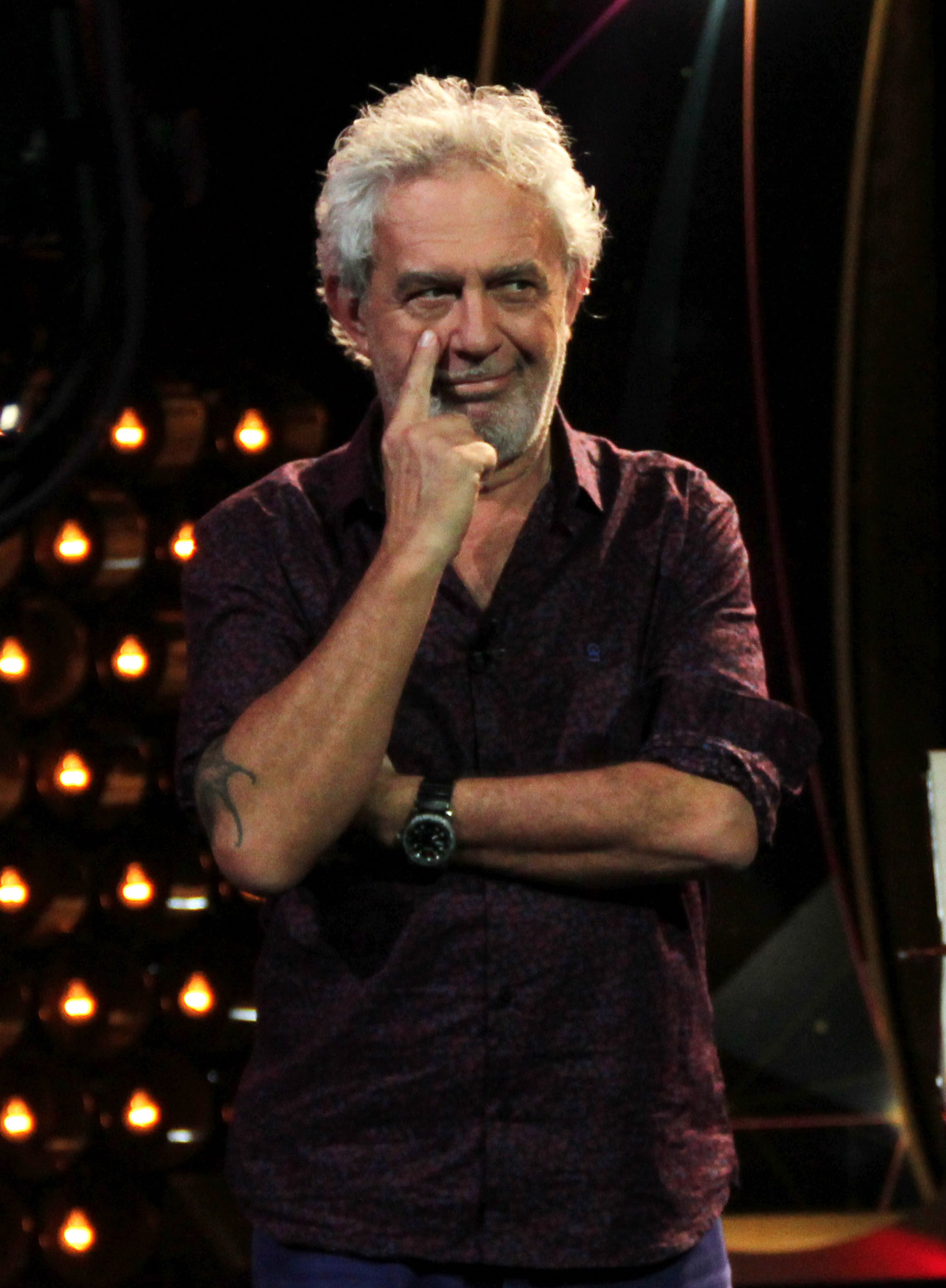
Lalo Mir

Eduardo Enrique Mir (born 14 June 1952) — popularly known as Lalo Mir — is an Argentine radio host, born in San Pedro, Buenos Aires Province.

== Works ==
=== Radio ===
At Radio Del Plata

- 9 P.M.
- Lalo Bla Bla

At FM Rock & Pop

- Aquí Radio Bangkok
- Buenos Aires, Una Divina Comedia
- Johnny Argentino
- Animal de Radio

At Radio Mitre

- Animados
- Lalo Bla Bla

At La 100

- Lalo por Hecho

At Radio Concierto

- Planeta Piraña

At Radio con Vos

- Musicology – recurring segment "La Discopedia" alongside music curator Soledad Rodríguez Zubieta (SRZ).

=== Television ===
- La noticia rebelde (ATC, 1988–1989)
- Rock & Pop TV (Canal 11, 1988)
- La Perla de Bangkok (Canal 11, 1988)
- Las patas de la mentira (América TV, 1996–1997)
- Planeta caníbal (América TV, 1997)
- Los osos (El Trece, 2002)
- La Vida es Arte (TV Pública, 2007)
- Monitor TV (Canal Encuentro, 2007)
- Encuentro en el Estudio (Canal Encuentro, 2009–presente)
- Vivo en Argentina (TV Pública, 2011)
- Graduados (Telefe, 2012)
- Viudas e hijos del Rock & Roll (Telefe, 2014)
- Los 90; la década que nos conectó (National Geographic)

=== Film ===
- Cualquiera vencerá (1987)
- Las aventuras de Dios (Eliseo Subiela, 2000)
- Cuando ella saltó (Sabrina Farji, 2007)
- El Arca (2007)
