= Chiquititas sin fin =

2006 Argentine television series

- Poster for Chiquititas Sin Fin starring Jorgelina Aruzzi
- Also known as: Chiquititas Sin Fin; Chiquititas 2006
- Genre: Telenovela
- Created by: Cris Morena
- Written by: Walter Ferreira Ramos; Delia Maunas
- Directed by: Carlos Pico; Grendel Resquin
- Starring: Jorgelina Aruzzi; Gastón Ricaud; Stefano de Gregorio; Gonzalo Heredia; María Carámbula; Mariana Briski; Lali Espósito; Peter Lanzani; Candela Vetrano and Alejo García Pintos
- Opening theme: "Chiquititas 2006"
- Country of origin: Argentina
- Original language: Spanish
- No. of seasons: 1
- No. of episodes: 150

Production
- Producer: Sofia Izaguirre
- Running time: 45 minutes
- Production companies: Cris Morena Group; RGB Entertainment

Original release
- Network: Telefe
- Release: April 3 – December 11, 2006

Related
- Chiquititas

Chiquititas Sin Fin, also known as Chiquititas 2006, is an Argentine 2006 television series created and produced by Cris Morena, to celebrate the 11th anniversary of the original series Chiquititas. Written by Walter Ferreira Ramos and Delia Maunas, and produced by Cris Morena and RGB Entertainment, the series has been aired on Disney Channel in some South American countries, Mexico, Greece and Spain. SBT also aired the show to Brazil in 2008. Sin Fin was adapted in Portugal and Romania, and is the basis for the Wii game Chiquititas: The Magical Journey. Stage presentations at the Gran Rex were also featured.

The series focuses on the search of a young woman for her lost son. After discovering that her child may be living at an orphanage, she goes there under the alter ego of a humorous and magical nanny figure, touching and changing their lives.

== Plot ==
Magali Garcia (Jorgelina Aruzzi) is a strict businesswoman who got pregnant in the past, and after revealing it to her father Vítor (Ernesto Claudio), was sent to an abandoned place. The Garcias' servant, under Vítor's orders, took the baby to an orphanage and lied to Magali that her baby was stillborn. The repentant servant later told Magali the truth, which made her hate her father. Magali started looking for the baby, and when she is sure it lives in the Modelo Dumont orphanage, she goes there under a new identity: the sweet, adorable, funny, offbeat Lili, helped by her best friend Lúcia (Mariana Richaudeau). In this guise as Magali's distant cousin, she assumes a maternal figure to the orphans. Lili also meets Terezinha (Mariana Briski), an arrogant housekeeper the kids see as an "evil witch"; the orphanage's owners Julieta (María Carámbula) and Pierre (Alejo García Pintos) Dumont; and their spoiled children Marcel (Luciano Ruiz) and Talita (Delfina Varni). The Dumonts are an ambitious, greedy, perverse avaricious family. Kili (Gastón Ricaud) is the orphanage's handsome, adorable chef, and he and Lili soon fall in love. The chiquititas of this series are Miki, Guta, and Mosquito, teenagers forming a loving triangle; the younger orphans are Valeria, Paula, Pulga, Luana, Anita, Nando, Josep, Eduardo, and Francisco.

== Reception ==
The soundtrack 24 Horas is among the ten 2006 top-selling albums, the Sin Fin Gran Rex presentation was released on DVD. The series finale was watched by the cast alongside fans at the Shopping Abasto, in Buenos Aires.

== Chiquititas: The Magical Journey (cancelled game) ==
Chiquititas: The Magical Journey was meant to be a fantasy-action 2009 game based on the Portuguese adaptation of Chiquititas Sin Fin, produced by Biodroid Productions and distributed by Emergent. It was meant to release on the PS2 and Wii, the game provides two playable characters from the 2006 show, Lily and Kili, exploring levels and fighting against enemies. The game was cancelled.
