= Alejandro Conde López =

Spanish painter (born 1939)

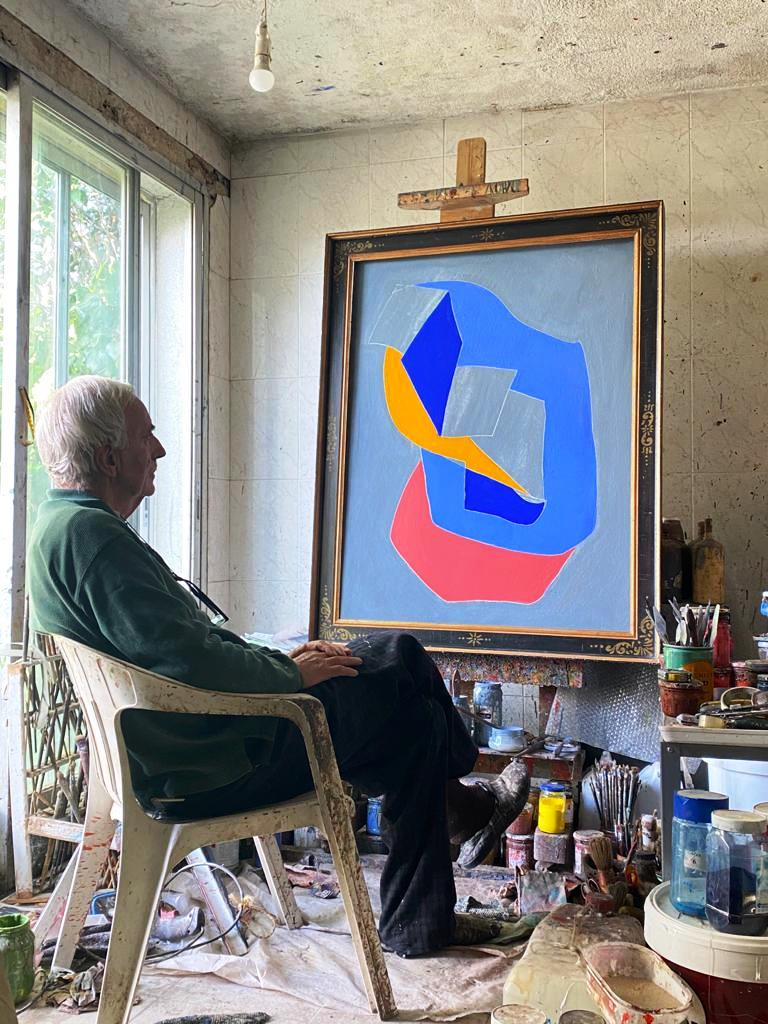
- Born: Alejandro Conde López; 1939 (age 86–87); Valladolid
- Education: Escuela de Artes y Oficios de Valladolid, Académie de la Grande Chaumière
- Known for: Painting
- Movement: Modernism, Expressionism, Informalism

Alejandro Conde López (Valladolid, February 7, 1939) is a Spanish painter specialized in figures, landscapes, and abstraction.

== Biography ==
He was born in Valladolid (Spain). He studied in Valladolid, at the Jesuit school, and later attended drawing and painting classes at the School of Arts and Crafts of Valladolid (1955-1958). In 1956, he began traveling to Paris, where he settled in 1959 and attended the Académie de la Grande Chaumière, making contact with Pablo Picasso and Salvador Dalí. In Paris, he became part of the so-called École de Paris from 1963 onwards, establishing connections with painters such as Julio Viera, among others. In 1959, he was invited to exhibit at the first world exhibition of young artists by "L'Étoile d'Or" in Paris. He became an exclusive artist of the Art Gallery "Rond Point Élysées" in Paris from 1960 until 1976. In 1964 and 1965, he participated in collective exhibitions in Paris, Munich, and Madrid.

In 1966, he definitively leaves Paris and in 1967, he settles in Madrid, where he continues painting and exhibiting. In 1993, after a period of being away from the art scene, he returns to exhibit on the occasion of the centenary of the birth of Joan Miró at the Palacio de Congresos y Exposiciones in Madrid.

Among the artists of his generation who shared reciprocal or mutual influences, Félix Cuadrado Lomas and Fernando Santiago "Jacobo" can be mentioned. They coincided with Alejandro Conde López at the School of Arts and Crafts. Additionally, Gabino Gaona, also a painter from Valladolid, was a member of the Grupo Simancas alongside them. Conde shared with them an interest in landscapes and an expressionist use of color. Despite exhibiting at Fernando Santiago's gallery in Valladolid, Conde first lived in Paris and later in Madrid. Therefore, despite their stylistic and origin affinities with the mentioned artists, he did not follow them to Simancas.

== Work ==
=== Figurative paintings ===
Alejandro Conde's painting style can be described as post-impressionist, and more specifically, close to Fauvist expressionism. In the treatment of landscapes and still lifes, he displays a naive approach, but at the same time, he exudes a satirical critique reminiscent of the abstract expressionism seen in the works of artists like Willem de Kooning, particularly in many of his portraits and figures.

=== Abstract paintings ===
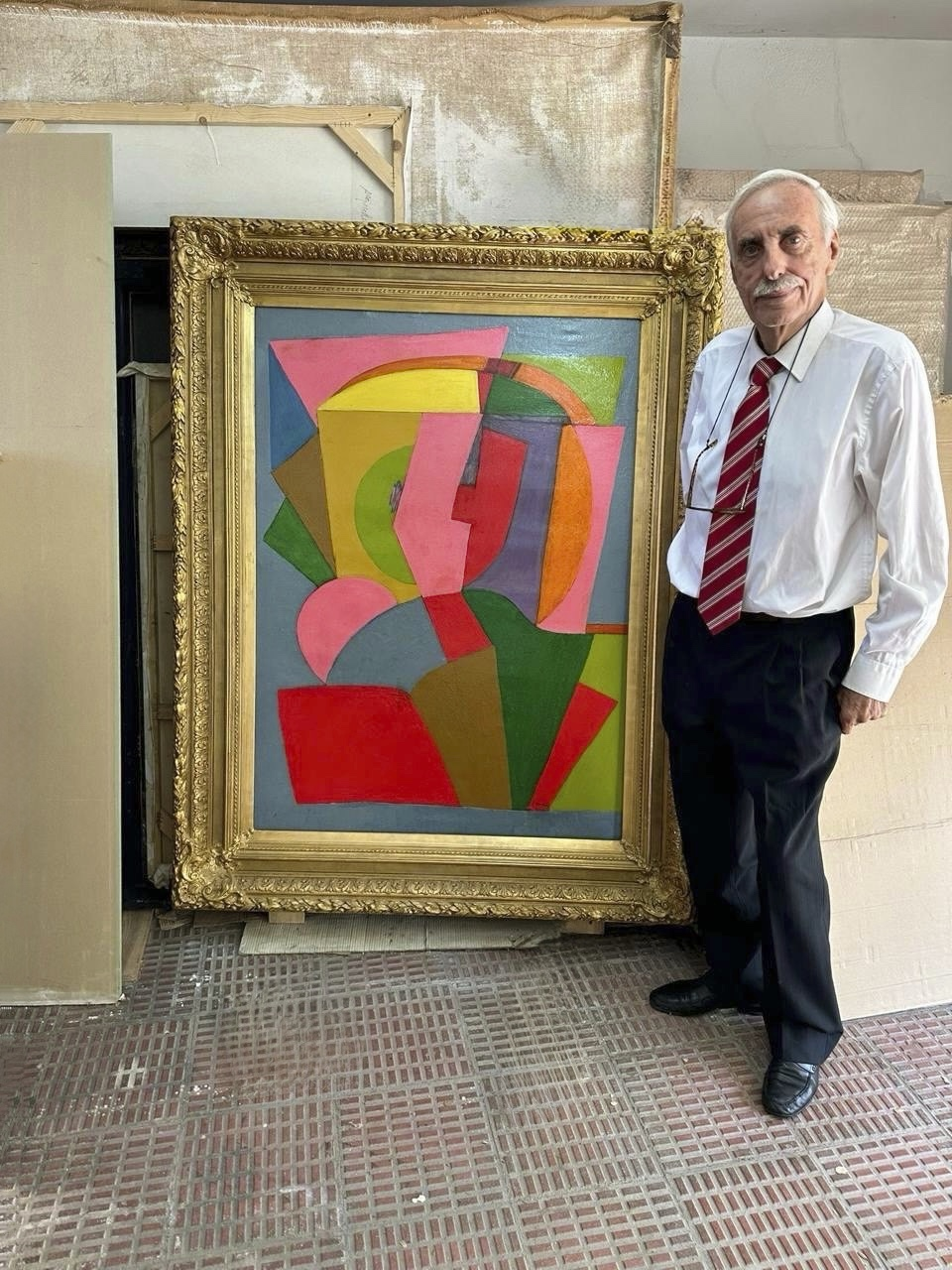
The painter Alejandro Conde López presents an abstract work of his painted in 2025

His abstract work stems from that Fauvism and is inspired by the colored light of church stained glass windows, as well as their ability to create an atmosphere that envelops the viewer, dazzling them initially and then inviting them to contemplation and reflection.

== See also ==
- Simancas Group
