= Villafrechós =

Coordinates: 41°54′N 5°14′W

Villafrechós, Spain
- Coat of arms

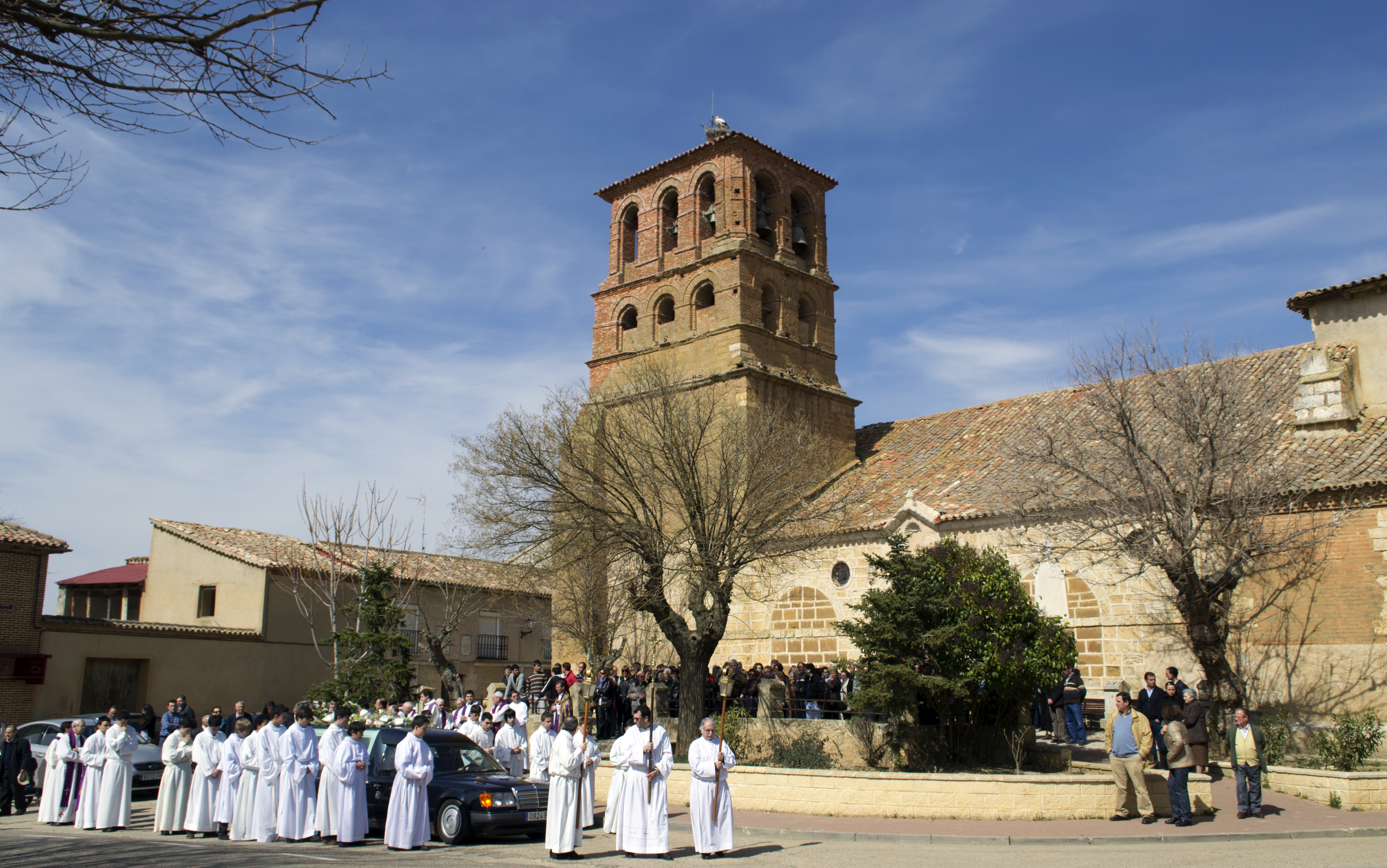
- Church
- Country: Spain
- Autonomous community: Castile and León
- Province: Valladolid
- Municipality: Villafrechós

Area
  - Total: 60 km^{2} (23 sq mi)

Population (2025-01-01)
  - Total: 473
  - Density: 9/km^{2} (23/sq mi)
- Time zone: UTC+1 (CET)
  - Summer (DST): UTC+2 (CEST)
- Website: villafrechos.org.es

Villafrechós is a municipality located in the province of Valladolid, Castile and León, Spain. According to the 2011 census (INE), the municipality has a population of 545 inhabitants. This town is known for the caramelized almonds. The mayor is Miguel Ángel Gómez Vaquero.

The town was the birthplace of Salvador Bezos, the paternal grandfather of Amazon founder Jeff Bezos. Jeff and his family visited the town in 2011.
