= Getap, Shirak =

Getap Գետափ
- Location within Armenia Location within Shirak
- Coordinates: 40°39′N 44°00′E
- Country: Armenia
- Province: Shirak
- Municipality: Artik
- Elevation: 1,750 m (5,740 ft)

Population (2011)
  - Total: 797
- Time zone: UTC+4
  - Summer (DST): UTC+5

Getap (Armenian: Գետափ) is a village in the Artik Municipality of the Shirak Province of Armenia. The Statistical Committee of Armenia reported its population was 822 in 2010, up from 819 at the 2001 census.

== Demographics ==
The population of the village since 1831 is as follows:

Historical population
Year	Pop.	±% p.a.
1831	84	—
1897	503	+2.75%
1926	640	+0.83%
1939	674	+0.40%
1959	654	−0.15%
1970	661	+0.10%
1979	606	−0.96%
2001	819	+1.38%
2011	797	−0.27%
