= Getap (radio program) =

Getap is an Argentine radio program, aired in Vorterix.

== Awards ==
- 2013 Martín Fierro Awards
  - Best journalist program.
  - Best female journalist (Romina Manguel)
