= Aula365 =

Argentine social network

Aula365 is an Argentine education and entertainment social network. It is the educational platform that served as an environment for the creation of 365 Social Comic Adventures in the World of the Future, winner on November 8, 2011, of the Guinness Record Award to the comics with the world's largest number of authors.

Aula365 is considered an educational website, as it has a multimedia platform for school age students with contents divided into initial, primary, secondary, and university levels, and contents for teachers and parents, in line with the Core Learning Priorities set out in the educational curricula of the different Ibero-American countries.

At the same time, this site is a social network, since the group of users can exchange knowledge when discussing the contents, making recommendations, asking and answering questions from other users, among other activities seeking to develop collaborative intelligence, which is a feature of the so- called Web 2.0.

== Contents ==
Aula365 operates in eleven countries in America and Europe. According to EFE agency, Aula365 is considered "the world's largest school" because it has school-related educational contents for minors, teenagers and adults. The site has a content library classified by ages and courses with interactive films, blogs, infographics, simulators and other resources. It is possible to consult virtual teachers, who answer any type of questions related to school contents. It also has English courses that offer interactive videos to stimulate children's interest.

== Record Guinness ==
On November 8, 2011, Adventures in the World of the Future or 365 Social Comic, a web comic created by Aula365, was awarded with the Guinness Record to the collaborative comic with the world's largest number of authors. Adventures in the World of the Future was composed of 20 episodes which were published every 15 days on Aula365 site. The production period lasted from April to October 2011.
