= Julio Viera =

Spanish painter (1934–2023)

Julio Viera (8 July 1934 – 27 August 2023) was a Spanish painter.

== Life and work ==
Viera was born in Las Palmas de Gran Canaria on 8 July 1934. He possessed a style akin to surrealism. A multifaceted artist, he worked in a Belgian coal mine to draw inspiration for the creation of his works. He has also served as an actor-director in theater and has created surrealistic films. He has dabbled in sculpture, jewelry design, poetry, music, novel writing, and has published satirical humor articles in the press, all in addition to his fundamental role as a painter and draftsman.

In Paris, towards the end of the 1950s, he establishes connections with other Spanish painters who are also in the French capital, such as Alejandro Conde López, and he meets and interacts with Salvador Dalí.

Critics have defined his work as that of a highly stylized modern Renaissance artist, a bold colorist with tremendous vitality and energy in his canvases. Due to its unique character, his work reaches the viewer, either inspiring enthusiasm or provoking indignation, as indifference seems to have no place with him.

Two of his monumental canvases are displayed at the Vatican Museums. These two large-format paintings (2 meters) are titled "Black Christ" and "Christ of the Atlantic." Julio Viera himself presented them to the Pope.

Viera died in Palma de Mallorca on 27 August 2023, at the age of 89.

== Bibliography ==
Miquel-Angel CLARET, crítica en "LA RESURECCIÓN DEL GATO" de Julio Viera. Ed. Promocions. Palma de Mallorca 1985. ISBN 84-86191-06-8
