= Pommez Internacional =

Argentine band

- Origin: Buenos Aires, Argentina
- Genres: Electronic; World Music; pop; experimental
- Years active: 2010–present
- Labels: Capricornio, Sadness Discos
- Members: Juan Ibarlucía; Hernán Ballotta; Ignacio Cruz; Demian Scalona; Tomás Bonifacio; Nicolás Croci
- Website: www.pommez.com.ar

Pommez Internacional is an Argentine band, founded in 2010 in Buenos Aires

== Discography ==
=== Albums ===
- Canto Serpiente (LP, 2016)
- Buenas Noches America (LP, 2013)
- La carrera del animal ["Animal's Run"] (OST, 2011)
- Contraluz Contraataque (LP, 2010)

=== Singles ===
- "Imperio" (2015)
- "Rosario de la Frontera/La Celebracion" (2011)
