= The Midfielder =

2014 film by Adrián Biniez

- Theatrical release poster
- Directed by: Adrián Biniez
- Written by: Adrián Biniez
- Produced by: Fernando Epstein; Agustina Chiarino; Gonzalo Rodriguez Bubis
- Starring: Esteban Lamothe; Julieta Zylberberg; Néstor Guzzini; César Bordón; Matías Castelli; Alfonso Tort; Luis Martínez)
- Cinematography: Guillermo Nieto
- Edited by: Fernando Epstein
- Music by: Adrián Biniez; Sebastián del Muro
- Production companies: Morocha Films; Mutante Cine; Pandora Filmproduktion; Petit Film; Topkapi Films
- Release dates: August 2014 (Venice Days); March 26, 2015
- Running time: 100 minutes
- Countries: Argentina; Uruguay; France; Germany; Netherlands
- Language: Spanish

The Midfielder, also known as El Cinco (Spanish: El 5 de Talleres), is a 2014 sports romantic comedy-drama film written and directed by Adrián Biniez, about an Argentine footballer in the Talleres de Remedios de Escalada club who contemplates an alternate career after receiving an unjust suspension. The film is a co-production between Argentina, Uruguay, France, Germany and the Netherlands.
