= Jorge Vidal =

Jorge Vidal may refer to:

- Jorge Vidal (gymnast)
- Jorge Vidal (field hockey)
