= Romina Manguel =

Argentine radio host

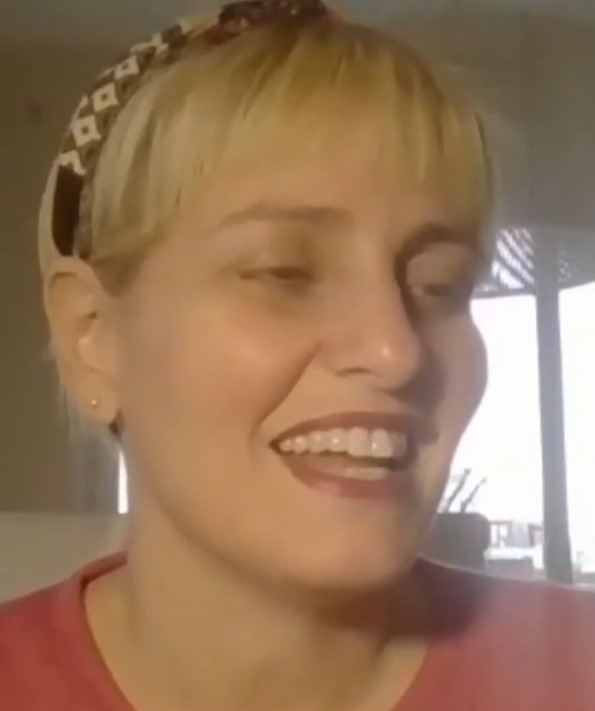
Romina Manguel

Romina Manguel (born 1973) is a Jewish-Argentine radio host, who works in Getap.

== Awards ==
- 2013 Martín Fierro Awards: Best female journalist.
