= Jorgelina Aruzzi =

Argentine actress

- Born: September 30, 1974 (age 51)
- Occupation: Actress
- Notable work: Chiquititas 2006, Educando a Nina
- Spouse: Pablo Garcia
- Children: Ámbar García Aruzzi

Jorgelina Aruzzi (born September 30, 1974) is an Argentine actress.

== Trajectory ==
She has participated in renowned television series, as Chiquititas, Son Amores, Amor Mío, La Niñera, La Dueña and others.

== TV series ==
- 2016 Educando a Nina as Suzy Contreras
- 2013 Vecinos en Guerra
- 2012 La pelu
- 2012 La Dueña
- 2011 Los únicos
- 2011 El hombre de tu vida
- 2011 Recordando el show de Alejandro Molina
- 2010 Alguien que me quiera
- 2008 Aquí no hay quien viva
- 2006 Chiquititas 2006
- 2005 Amor Mío
- 2004 El disfraz
- 2004 La Niñera
- 2002/03 Son Amores
- 2002 Dadyvertido
- 2002 Una para todas
- 2001 El sodero de mi vida
- 2001 Peor es nada
- 2001 Campeones
- 2000 Chabonas
- 1998 Los Rodriguez
- 1997/98 El Show de Videomatch
- 1995/96 El palacio de la risa
