= Pablo Echarri =

Argentine actor

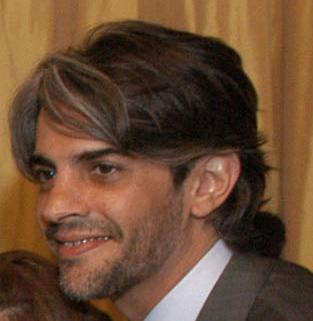
- Born: Pablo Daniel Echarri; September 21, 1969 (age 56) (Argentina) Sarandí, Avellaneda, Buenos Aires Province
- Occupation: Actor
- Years active: 1993 - Present
- Spouse: Nancy Dupláa (m. 2007)
- Partner: Natalia Oreiro (1994-2000)
- Children: Morena Echarri Dupláa (b. August 23, 2003); Julián Echarri Dupláa (b. April 8, 2010)

Pablo Daniel Echarri (born September 21, 1969) is a leading Argentine actor.

== Biography ==
He was born in Villa Domínico a recreational-park area next to residencial Wilde, Avellaneda, Buenos Aires

== Career ==
Pablo Echarri began his career on Argentine television in 1993. He was given his first significant film role in the 1998 thriller, The Detour, and received his first major film award at the Havana Film Festival for Best Actor for his role in Only People, in 1999. He was further honored by the Spanish Actors Union for his 2005 role in The Method, and in Argentina in 2006 for Chronicle of an Escape in both cases portraying the film's chief antagonist.

In 2019 he was attached to star in a Spanish language TV remake of To Catch A Thief.

== Personal life ==
He married fellow Argentine actress Nancy Dupláa in 2007, and the couple has two children.
