= The Eternaut (TV series) =

Argentine television series

- Spanish: El Eternauta
- Genre: Science fiction; Mystery thriller; Survival; Post-apocalyptic
- Created by: Bruno Stagnaro
- Based on: The Eternaut by: Héctor Germán Oesterheld; Francisco Solano López
- Written by: Bruno Stagnaro; Ariel Staltari
- Directed by: Bruno Stagnaro
- Starring: Ricardo Darín; Carla Peterson; César Troncoso; Andrea Pietra; Ariel Staltari; Marcelo Subiotto; Mora Fisz; Claudio Martínez Bel; Orianna Cárdenas
- Composer: Federico Jusid
- Country of origin: Argentina
- Original language: Spanish
- No. of seasons: 1
- No. of episodes: 6

Production
- Producers: Diego Copello; Leticia Cristi; Matías Mosteirín; Hugo Sigman
- Production location: Buenos Aires, Argentina
- Cinematography: Gastón Girod
- Editors: Alejandro Brodersohn; Alejandro Parysow
- Running time: 44–68 minutes
- Production companies: K&S Films; Netflix
- Budget: US$15 million

Original release
- Network: Netflix
- Release: 30 April 2025 – present

The Eternaut (Spanish: El Eternauta) is an Argentine science fiction television series created by Bruno Stagnaro, based on the classic and acclaimed comic book The Eternaut, first published in 1957 by Héctor Germán Oesterheld and Francisco Solano López. Produced by Netflix and K&S Films, the series stars Ricardo Darín, Carla Peterson, César Troncoso, Andrea Pietra, Ariel Staltari, Marcelo Subiotto, and Claudio Martínez Bel. The Eternaut premiered on 30 April 2025, directed by Bruno Stagnaro and supervised by one of Héctor Oesterheld’s grandchildren. It received generally favorable reviews. In May 2025, Netflix renewed the series for a second season.

== Premise ==
In Buenos Aires, a mysterious snowfall occurs one night, quickly killing most of the population. Juan Salvo and his friends are among the thousands who survive, but in the aftermath, life is a struggle. Then, they learn the snow was just the beginning of an attack by extraterrestrial invaders. "The only way to stay alive is to join together and fight. No one will survive on their own."

== Cast and characters ==
- Ricardo Darín as Juan Salvo, a "common man involved in an extraordinary situation."
- Carla Peterson as Elena, Salvo's ex-wife
- César Troncoso as Alfredo Favalli ("Tano")
- Andrea Pietra as Ana, Favalli's wife
- Ariel Staltari as Omar: an original character created for the series, which Staltari described as "the audience's eye, who somewhat questions the friends' bond."
- Marcelo Subiotto as Lucas, a friend of Salvo
- Mora Fisz as Clara Salvo, daughter of Juan and Elena
- Claudio Martínez Bel as Polsky ("Ruso"), a friend of Salvo
- Orianna Cárdenas as Inga, an original character created for the series

== Episodes ==
No. overall	No. in season	Title	Directed by	Written by	Original release date
1	1	"Noche de truco" "A Night of Cards"	Bruno Stagnaro	Bruno Stagnaro, Ariel Staltari, and Gabriel Stagnaro	30 April 2025
Three girls sailing at sea are suddenly hit by a strange neon cloud and violent waves, killing two of them. In the city, a group of friends—Tano, Juan, Ruso, Lucas, and the unwelcome Omar—gather at Tano’s house for their weekly card game. As they drink and play, strange noises begin outside, and they discover that a mysterious substance is falling from the sky. Anyone who steps outdoors collapses and dies instantly. Vincente, who was outside, is found dead, and despite Tano’s warnings, Ruso runs out to check on his family and dies the same way. The group seals the house and tries to stay calm. A delivery girl named Inga arrives begging for help; they reluctantly let her in after confirming her story. Juan becomes desperate to reach his ex-wife Elena and his daughter Clara. After seeing more neighbors die upon opening their window, he insists on leaving. Tano helps him improvise a protective suit and gives him a special mask. Omar tries to steal the mask at gunpoint but fails. Once prepared, Juan ventures out into the deadly snowfall, passing numerous bodies as he begins his mission to find his family.
2	2	"Salgan al sol" "Step Into the Sun"	Bruno Stagnaro	Bruno Stagnaro, Ariel Staltari, and María Alicia Garcias	30 April 2025
Juan walks through the deserted streets of Buenos Aires. He encounters a group of people sheltering in a stranded train, asking for help. With only one protective mask available, Juan gives them water but is forced to leave them behind. At Tano’s house, tensions rise as he worries about their resources and Juan’s prolonged absence. Tano distrusts Inga and Omar, considering them a threat. Inga grows restless and prepares to leave, but Tano goes out first using a homemade mask. While inspecting Inga’s motorcycle, he discovers that only older technology appears to function and successfully powers a radio using an old car battery. After hours of walking, Juan arrives at Elena’s apartment building. He reunites with her, but they realize Clara is missing. Juan suggests going to the school to locate the friend’s house where Clara was staying. Neighbors hear of Juan’s arrival and confront him about how he survived the snowfall. Juan draws his pistol to leave with Elena. The situation escalates into a gunfight with the neighbors. Juan and Elena take refuge in an empty apartment. Juan insists that Elena take the mask and go searching for Clara. They improvise a protective suit for her and she escapes. Juan stays behind to hold off the neighbors. After they break in, Juan covers his head with plastic, smashes a window, and escapes, but collapses due to lack of air. Tano, Inga, and the others use makeshift gear to reach a fire station and collect masks and fire suits. After hearing gunshots, they locate and rescue Juan. While unconscious, Juan experiences visions of a valley and a mysterious man, with the scene turning red. He awakens in a truck with his friends and Elena.
3	3	"El magnetismo" "Magnetism"	Bruno Stagnaro	Bruno Stagnaro and Ariel Staltari	30 April 2025
The night the snowfall begins, Inga agrees to complete a delivery on behalf of her brother, unknowingly placing herself outside when the disaster strikes. In the present, Tano fails to contact other survivors using his radio. A neighbor, Benito, arrives and asks for Tano’s car to deliver supplies to others. Tano refuses and Omar steals the car and drives away. Omar crashes against a massive car wreck blocking the road. As he loses consciousness, he notices a red light in the sky. Unknown individuals rescue him. Juan and Elena set out on foot to Clara’s school. They spend the night hiding in a car to avoid looters. Elena is concerned about Juan’s mental state, noting that he has avoided using firearms since returning from the army. The next morning, Juan and Elena arrive at the school. Juan finds an old car that still functions, while Elena searches the office for Clara’s friend’s address. Elena discovers a young boy, Pablo, locked in a closet. He explains that his friends had trapped him there as a prank. Juan returns and warns Pablo about the deadly snowfall, but the boy refuses to listen. After seeing his friends’ corpses outside, Pablo agrees to help them if they take him home after finding Clara. Pablo gives them his own address, but upon arrival, they discover his family is dead. Pablo develops a fever from the shock. Juan breaks into a local pharmacy for medicine. They are ambushed by a couple who steal Elena’s bag and lock them in the toilet. After Pablo frees Juan and Elena, they give him their spare mask and journey back to Tano’s house. Juan continues to experience visions. Inga goes to the park and finds her brother dead. She returns to Tano’s house, where Elena and Ana comfort her. Tano and Lucas go out to gather more supplies. They encounter Benito, who proposes closing all the roads and gives Tano 24 hours to allow them access to his garage. Tano strongly disagrees. Back at the house, Tano finally makes radio contact with a man in Uruguay, who has also communicated with Brazil. They conclude that the deadly snowfall is occurring worldwide. The transmission is cut short, and Tano notices the compass malfunctioning. Juan, Elena, and Pablo arrive at Tano’s house. Tano announces his intention to leave the city and go to his house on the island, believing the Earth’s magnetic field has shifted. Juan is focused solely on finding Clara, and the two men argue when Tano suggests that Clara may be dead. The couple who previously stole Juan’s car are attacked and killed by an unseen force.
4	4	"Credo" "Creed"	Bruno Stagnaro	Bruno Stagnaro, Ariel Staltari, and Martín Wain	30 April 2025
The episode opens with a figure wearing a yellow protective suit and mask walking beneath a bridge. At Tano’s house, the group holds a brief funeral for Ruso. Afterward, Juan and Elena argue over how to continue searching for Clara. Elena wishes to remain behind to care for Pablo, while Juan is determined to keep looking for their daughter. Tano leaves to gather additional supplies before the group departs for the island. He advises Ana to help Juan search the phone book for Clara’s friend’s address. The phone book is found in a trash bin outside, and Juan successfully locates the address. Lucas accompanies Tano to a supermarket, and they maintain contact with Inga using a walkie-talkie. Inga informs them that Juan has found the address and is heading downtown. Concerned, Lucas convinces Tano to go after Juan. Tano meets Juan on the road, and they agree to search for Clara together before leaving the city. Tano theorizes that the ring of radioactive particles surrounding the Earth has been destroyed, which he believes may have caused the deadly snowfall. As they continue, they reach a massive pileup of wrecked vehicles blocking the road. When they exit the car to investigate, military vehicles approach, and a soldier orders them to turn back, stating that the downtown area has been sealed off. She tells them that assistance is being sent from the Campo de Mayo and advises them to find shelter and wait. Suspicious, Tano and Juan secretly follow the military convoy. In the city center, soldiers begin firing, forcing Tano to turn the car. They come face to face with large insect-like creatures and witness one of the soldiers being captured and wrapped in a web. Juan and Tano manage to hide and avoid detection. During this time, Juan experiences another vision involving fire and armed men. When he regains focus, they decide to move carefully. They discover that the soldiers have disappeared and collect abandoned ammunition. As they proceed, they observe one of the creatures dragging away a captured soldier. Tano accidentally makes a noise, awakening the creatures. Juan shoots and kills one, attracting the attention of others. The two flee and reach a church, where they are taken in by a survivor who leads them to a group hiding inside. Omar is among them and attempts to portray Juan and Tano as dangerous, but Juan defuses the situation. The group explains that the creatures are drawn to light. They go to the rooftop to observe their surroundings. When Tano attempts to leave, a nun stops him. A small group of survivors returns from searching for supplies, and Juan tells Tano of his plan to leave the church to continue looking for Clara. Omar informs Juan of a sealed passageway beneath a bridge that may offer a route around the wreckage. He also mentions that Rengo, one of the survivors, recognizes Juan from his military service, though Juan does not recall him. Juan sneaks out and experiences another vision of the creatures marching. He returns and tells the group that he has found a functioning truck and believes they can move. After a vote, they decide to leave before more creatures arrive. Juan later confides in Rengo about his visions. Rengo expresses understanding but says he does not share similar experiences. He also reveals that he and the nun intend to stay behind, as he fears his disability will slow the others down. The group prepares to move toward the blocked passageway and hides in a bus while some of the men break through the barrier. A young mother with a baby is among them. When the baby begins to cry, the creatures are nearly alerted, but the wall is breached in time. Juan, the mother, and the baby are temporarily trapped in the bus. To distract the creatures, the nun and Rengo ring the church bell. This allows the trapped survivors to escape into the passageway. The creatures converge on the church, where Rengo and the nun remain. They pour paraffin throughout the building and, after lighting cigarettes, set the church on fire, sacrificing themselves to kill many of the creatures. After passing through the tunnel, the group reaches the location of the truck Juan had found, only to discover it buried under debris. While attempting to free it, the creatures attack again. Tano is briefly caught but is rescued before being fully trapped. The group manages to free the truck and escape, with Juan and several armed men firing from the back as they drive away. As they leave, Juan looks back at the burning church and realizes he had seen the scene in one of his visions.
5	5	"Paisaje" "Horizon"	Bruno Stagnaro	Bruno Stagnaro and Ariel Staltari	30 April 2025
The episode opens with another vision experienced by Juan. He sees himself as a young soldier on a battlefield. After being knocked unconscious by an explosion and falling into a trench, he awakens the next morning to find everyone dead and snow falling. He then sees his older self watching him, seemingly trying to warn him. In the present, the group arrives in Tano’s neighborhood. Tano, Omar, and Juan decide to return to their homes, while the rest of the group continues toward Campo de Mayo. Upon arriving, Juan is stunned to find Clara asleep in Elena’s arms, mirroring his earlier visions. Although shocked, he quickly recovers and wakes his daughter. Clara is weak, so Juan carries her to bed. Elena reassures him that Clara is safe and was fortunate to find her way back. The family briefly reunites. Roberto visits Tano to discuss the situation, having heard rumors about the insect-like creatures. Tano confirms their existence and informs him that they are leaving the area. Roberto proposes a deal, offering his recreational vehicle in exchange for Tano’s house and garage, believing that he and his group can fight the creatures. Tano agrees, and preparations for departure continue. Before leaving, Tano notices that Clara’s protective suit matches one from his boat. Clara insists she has never been on the boat and does not remember anything. The group heads toward the port, but the river is dry and too muddy to cross. They choose an alternate route, and Tano briefly returns to his boat to check something. While traveling, they encounter a car that had nearly collided with them earlier and discover that the family inside has been shot. They later come across a group of people living in a shopping mall, where there is abundant food and a more relaxed atmosphere. The group settles in, though Juan remains cautious and expresses distrust toward one of the men present. That night, as they drink together, Juan confides in Lucas that Clara’s sudden return feels unreal. Lucas suggests that Juan may be struggling mentally. A boy attempts to approach Clara, but she becomes distressed and begins hitting herself. Juan and Elena intervene to calm her. Elena proposes going to Campo de Mayo so Clara can receive medical help. Tano then reveals that he found the boat’s logbook, which shows that Clara had signed it out. Lucas later apologizes to the boy. He joins the children for a card game but leaves to get whisky after hearing a noise. The next morning, Lucas is missing. At the same time, the snowfall suddenly stops, allowing people to go outside without protective masks. As Juan and Tano search for Lucas, three armed individuals attack the mall and open fire. In the chaos, the boy who had spoken to Clara is shot. A gunfight follows, and Juan kills one of the attackers, only to discover she is a young mother, as indicated by a necklace suggesting she has three children. He is shaken by the realization. While tending to the wounded, Lucas returns accompanied by soldiers from Campo de Mayo. He convinces the group to travel with the soldiers to the camp. As they leave, the river is seen flowing again. Juan and Tano question Lucas about his disappearance, but he claims he became drunk and passed out, and was later found by the soldiers. After a long journey, the group arrives at Campo de Mayo. In a separate scene, one of the attackers is seen walking beneath a bridge. The insect-like creatures move aside and do not attack him, suggesting a possible connection between them.
6	6	"Jugo de tomate frío" "Cold Tomato Juice"	Bruno Stagnaro	Bruno Stagnaro, Ariel Staltari, and María Alicia Garcias	30 April 2025
The episode opens with Juan experiencing another vision. He sees himself encountering the woman he killed during the mall attack, this time in a peaceful setting while shopping during the Christmas season. He awakens alone in an open field, confused. It is revealed that he lost consciousness while collecting firewood with Tano and Clara at Campo de Mayo. Life at the camp is calmer than before, though Tano remains concerned about Juan’s mental and physical health. Tano is summoned to meet with the commanding sergeant, where he learns that Lucas has identified him as an electrical engineer. The military requests Tano’s help repairing an old radio in order to contact other survivors. Tano initially refuses, unwilling to leave the safety of the camp. Meanwhile, soldiers train civilians to use firearms. The boy who was wounded during the mall attack is confirmed to have died. Tano later agrees to assist with the radio repair, particularly after Roberto arrives at the camp and reveals that his group was overwhelmed by the creatures despite being heavily armed. Tano’s wife pleads with him to stay behind, but Juan also volunteers to join the mission. Two men approach Juan, including a train engineer who suggests repairing nearby trains to reach the city center and the communications tower. The following morning, a group of volunteers and soldiers departs for the mission. They reach the train station and successfully restore one train, using it to bypass the wall of wreckage and enter the downtown area. The team splits into three units: one to investigate planes seen near the tower, one to retrieve the radio, and one to provide security. The group tasked with restoring the radio succeeds in sending out a broadcast calling for other survivors. However, concern arises when the team sent to investigate the planes fails to return on time. The remaining group encounters other survivors, though their behavior appears unnatural. It is revealed that they have been manipulated to cooperate with the creatures. Among them are Inga and Omar, now in a relationship. Juan notices suspicious activity near a stadium and urges the group’s leader to investigate, but the request is denied due to the missing team. To distract Omar, a card game is organized. During the game, Lucas suddenly becomes agitated and stabs Omar before fleeing. Juan and Tano pursue him to the rooftop, where Lucas speaks cryptically about everything being planned and warns them not to interfere. Before they can stop him, Lucas jumps to his death. Shortly afterward, the missing team returns, but they too have been compromised and attack the others. Juan, Tano, Omar, and a small group manage to escape and flee by train. Juan decides to head toward the stadium to investigate, accompanied by a soldier named Franco, while the others return to Campo de Mayo to warn the camp. At the stadium, Juan and Franco discover it is a base used by the creatures, where human captives are being trained and controlled. The captives appear to be hypnotized and are being prepared to fight on behalf of the creatures. As Juan explores the site, he begins to understand the source of his visions. He realizes he is experiencing a form of déjà vu, suggesting that he has lived these events before and is reliving them. The leader of the creatures begins to sing an ethereal melody, and Juan sees his daughter among the hypnotized captives. He finally understands the cause of Clara’s strange behavior, as the season draws to a close.

== Background ==
In 1968, the advertisement production company Gil & Bertolini acquired the rights to The Eternaut to make an animated television series, to be presented at the First World Comic Book Biennial. Each episode would be introduced by Oesterheld himself, and the animation would be rotoscoped, a very expensive technique at the time. The project was cancelled after the production of a 24-minute pilot.

For the following twenty years, financial and copyrights problems prevented different adaptations of The Eternaut for film and television. Argentine directors such as Fernando "Pino" Solanas and Gustavo Mosquera expressed interest on adapting the material, as did Adolfo Aristarain. At the time, Aristarain said that the only way to produce the film would be in English, given it would cost at least US$10–15 million and American actors would be conditional to get the necessary funds from American production companies; nevertheless, he also considered "that wouldn't be the correct way" to do it, because he considered the Argentine culture and point of view an integral part of The Eternaut's narration.

In 1995, there was a miniseries project led by a major TV network from Buenos Aires, with computer animation company Aicon in charge of special effects. A preliminary contract had been signed with a big Hollywood studio, but the production never started.

In 2007, an Italian production company worked on an adaptation of The Eternaut, in agreement with Oesterheld's widow and grandsons. It entered negotiations with Argentine studios and the National Institute of Cinema and Audiovisual Arts (INCAA) for a possible co-production. In 2008, director Lucrecia Martel was hired to write the screenplay And direct a film adaptation of The Eternaut, which would have taken place in the present day. She worked on the script for a year and a half, but the Oesterheld family decided that the production strayed too far from the source material, the producers stepped down and the project went stagnant. In 2018, Spanish filmmaker Álex de la Iglesia expressed interest in making an adaptation, with actor Ricardo Darín on board to star in the project.

Director Bruno Stagnaro had always liked the source material and he always felt very close to it, citing its "definite and precise anchoring in [Argentina's] space" as an influence for his early projects Pizza, Beer, and Cigarettes (1998) and Okupas (2000). In 2003, he began writing his own version of the story set in a present-day post-apocalyptic Buenos Aires, completing the script of the first episode and doing tests with Okupas' star Rodrigo de la Serna at the Ideas del Sur production company. However, the project was quickly dropped over budget concerns.

== Production ==
=== Development ===
K&S Films made a deal with the author's estate in the early 2000s. The project, initially a film, became a series after Netflix entered the project in 2018. According to K&S Films producer Matías Mosteirín, "Getting back to episodic structure was the best scenario in terms of the narrative and being loyal to the DNA of the original story." That same year, Stagnaro met with Mosteirín and co-producer Leticia Cristi and told them about his project, which they linked to their version of The Eternaut. Martín Oesterheld—the author's grandson—and Laura Bruno, who own the rights for the original comic book, gave permission for the project on the condition of it being filmed in Buenos Aires and spoken in Spanish.

In February 2020, Netflix co-founder Reed Hastings announced they would produce a series adaptation of The Eternaut, directed by Stagnaro with Martín Oesterheld—also a filmmaker—as a consultant, to be released between late 2021 and early 2022. In August 2021, Netflix Vice President for Latin American Content Francisco Ramos assured that the project was still moving forward, but that the series wouldn't be released before 2023 due to complications related to the COVID-19 pandemic. Ramos detailed the development of the screenplay as well as the "technological and technical design" of the series, which he described as "one of the most ambitious Latin American projects in Spanish ever made". In March 2025, Ramos reiterated that The Eternaut would be "a turning point for the film industry in Argentina" when it comes to "technological advances, audacity, entertainment and film language". In February 2023, The Eternaut was one of the projects selected for the BA Cash Rebate program for international productions filming in Buenos Aires, receiving up to 20% of expenses.

On 1 May 2025, a day after the first season premiered, Netflix confirmed development of a second season, which will conclude the series, with Stagnaro returning as creator and director. According to Francisco Ramos, season 2 will "dig into a lot of sci-fi concepts that were only mentioned in season 1, and they are going to be fully developed". The season will likely consist of eight episodes.

=== Writing ===
The script was written in two years. Early in development a decision was made to set the series in the present day. According to Stagnaro, this kept it in line with the spirit of the original work, in which the author "plays a lot with it being contemporary to the reader." The point was for the city to be "a living presence in the story" and for the audience to recognize the space the characters inhabit as a parallel version of their own world.

Stagnaro considered that the main challenge was making decisions that are necessary but controversial among fans of the original work. "It's like a trap, beyond the decisions you make, there will always be some people that are left resentful. There's that mentality of 'not touching the original story because it is sacred.'" He also pointed out that The Eternaut, unlike other post-apocalyptic works of fiction, showed the unfolding of events in real time instead of jumping forward to a point where they were already advanced, which he considered "one of its greatest complexities."

Stagnaro highlighted the difficulty of adapting the story from a serialized comic book, with "absolutely ephemeral" character arcs and "little long-term construction", to a TV series with hour-long episodes. He wanted to preserve the "precarity" and atada con alambre (transl. patched-up) quality from the Eternaut comic book that represented Argentine culture, which he considered as "what we can contribute to global science fiction".

Martín Oesterheld stated that the series aimed to be faithful to his grandfather's vision, where "no one saves themselves" and there is a "collective hero", a term the author included in his original prologue for the comic book. Stagnaro added that the series is about characters that were "almost beaten down by the system or about to be discarded" and are given a second chance. Mosteirín said that the show also deals with loyalty and friendship. He described it as "a tragedy, but an epic and an adventure as well."

=== Casting ===
In March 2023, Ricardo Darín was revealed to be in negotiations to star in the series, and he confirmed his involvement in April. Darín also said the series would be "an updated version" with a broader reach than local audiences. Darín's casting was controversial due to the age difference between him and his character in the comics. Initially, Stagnaro doubted casting 68-year-old Darín as a character in his thirties due to the physicality required for the role. However, that allowed for the possibility to justify the character's knowledge of guns, uncommon in Argentina, as well as his habit of playing Truco with friends, in order for the character to be believable in the updated setting of the story.

=== Design ===
María Battaglia and Julián Romera were the series's art directors. Battaglia explained that the snow in Buenos Aires was inspired by "high mountain documentaries, Norwegian painters and various Buenos Aires photographers" for realism. They considered the original comic book to be the show bible, consulting it to address artistic and aesthetic concerns. Five different kinds of snowflakes were created for the show for different purposes, such as kitchen salt for footprints on the ground, and dried foaming soap for falling snow.

For Juan Salvo's wardrobe, Darín commented that he wanted something "waterproof and light, more modern" but Stagnaro insisted on using clothing with "an old smell" to it, and decided on a sheepskin coat, which was much heavier to wear and proved difficult while doing stunts. Darín ultimately commended the director's decision.

=== Filming ===
Filming began in Buenos Aires in May 2023. Gastón Girod served as director of photography. The cast was announced to include Carla Peterson, César Troncoso, Andrea Pietra, Ariel Staltari, Marcelo Subiotto, Claudio Martínez Bel, Orianna Cárdenas, and Mora Fisz. In June 2023, scenes were shot at the Avenida General Paz, the border between Vicente López Partido and Buenos Aires neighborhoods Núñez and Saavedra. The sets featured snow, armed soldiers, and old cars. Further filming at Saavedra took place in October 2023. In November 2023, it was reported that filming was delayed due to Darín's busy schedule. Shooting continued with the rest of the cast, while Peterson had already finished filming her scenes. Filming concluded in December 2023, lasting 148 days.

Over 35 locations were used, with over 25 stages created through virtual production. Vast areas of Buenos Aires were digitally scanned and translated into an Unreal Engine virtual reality system, to then be projected onto a screen on set, which allowed filming of exterior scenes from different environments consecutively without sacrificing "identity and realism." The COVID-19 pandemic enabled the filming of the "desolate city" from the comic.

=== Post-production ===
Post-production lasted for a year and a half. Alejandro Brodersohn and Alejandro Parysow served as editors and Martín Grignaschi was the sound designer, with Pablo Accame and Ignacio Pol as VFX supervisors. Stagnaro said technological development was one of the main reasons the project was possible. He thought it was crucial to have the autonomy to "design and then own" the digital environment instead of it "coming already pre-designed from abroad", as the original work had "such deep roots" in Argentina that only locals could construct it. The digitally scanned and projected environments were then sent to foreign studios to "complement the work".

International visual effects vendors included DNEG in London, ReDefine in Barcelona, Scanline VFX in Los Angeles, Planet X in the Netherlands, and ILP in Stockholm. The visual effects were added in during filming, to allow Stagnaro to "remain creative on the set" and have more freedom. Generative AI was also used, to create a shot of a collapsing building. This was confirmed by Netflix's co-chief executive Ted Sarandos, who claimed it was used to speed up production and save money.

== Music ==
Federico Jusid composed the score for The Eternaut. The series includes several songs by Argentine artists: "No pibe" and "Jugo de tomate frío" by Manal, "El magnetismo" by Él Mató a un Policía Motorizado, "Fuego" by Intoxicados, "Cuando pase el temblor" by Soda Stereo, "Credo (Chacarera Trunca)" sung by Mercedes Sosa, "Caminito" and "Volver" by Carlos Gardel, "Salgan al sol" by Billy Bond y la Pesada del Rock and Roll, and "Chacarera del rancho" by Los Hermanos Ábalos. It also features "Let It Snow! Let It Snow! Let It Snow!" sung by Dean Martin and "Auld Lang Syne" by Robert Burns.

All tracks are written by Federico Jusid, except when noted.

No.	Title	Writer(s)	Length
1.	"Limbo"		0:56
2.	"El Eternauta"		3:08
3.	"Hombres-Robots"		1:40
4.	"Hay algo en el aire"		4:22
5.	"Sol"		2:39
6.	"Cascarudos"		1:33
7.	"Lo que se rompió es el mundo"	Federico Jusid; Francisco Sokolowicz	1:59
8.	"Maquinaria pesada"	Federico Jusid; Francisco Sokolowicz	1:23
9.	"Muralla"		1:27
10.	"Los "Manos""		2:51
11.	"Campo de Mayo"		1:26
12.	"Antes de llegar abajo sos boleta"		3:13
13.	"Militares"		1:41
14.	"Casa rodante"	Federico Jusid; Francisco Sokolowicz	1:17
15.	"Restos de formación"		1:33
16.	"Tres ráfagas"		1:02
17.	"San Jorge"		1:12
18.	"Exterminio"		1:10
19.	"Lo viejo funciona"	Federico Jusid; Francisco Sokolowicz	1:25
20.	"Armemos un traje"		1:46
21.	"Clara"	Federico Jusid; Francisco Sokolowicz	2:03
22.	"¡Se escucha, carajo!"	Federico Jusid; Francisco Sokolowicz	1:18
23.	"Fuga"		1:28
24.	"Buenos aires nevada"		1:34
Total length:			44:06

== Release ==
The first season was released in its entirety on Netflix on 30 April 2025, consisting of six episodes. The series was originally set to be released between late 2021 and early 2022, but was delayed to 2025 due to complications related to the COVID-19 pandemic.

== Reception ==
On the review aggregator website Rotten Tomatoes, The Eternaut has an approval rating of 95% based on 19 critics' reviews. The website's critics consensus reads, "Grounded by layered performances and a foreboding pace, The Eternaut is a post-apocalyptic adventure that derives its thrills from character as much as it does set pieces." Metacritic, which uses a weighted average, assigned a score of 73 out of 100, based on 5 critics, indicating "generally favorable" reviews.

== Viewership ==
According to data from Showlabs, The Eternaut ranked seventh on Netflix in the United States during the week of 28 April–4 May 2025.
