= List of Argentine films of 1969 =

A list of films produced in Argentina in 1969:

Argentine films of 1969
Title	Director	Release	Genre
A - C
Adolescente viaje al sol	Juan Antonio Serna	11 December	
Alla lejos y hace tiempo	Ricardo Becher		
Amor libre	Fernando Siro	22 May	
Breve cielo	David José Kohon	5 June	
El bulín	Ángel Acciaresi	12 June	
El cantor enamorado	Juan Antonio Serna	8 October	
Cautiva en la selva	Leo Fleider	30 October	
Corazón contento	Enrique Carreras	2 April	
La culpa	Kurt Land	30 April	
D - G
Los debutantes en el amor	Leo Fleider	28 August	
De la tierra a la luna (Misión Apolo)	Guillermo Fernández Jurado	16 July	
Deliciosamente amoral	Julio Porter	27 February	
El dependiente	Leonardo Favio	1 January	
Desnuda en la arena	Armando Bó	13 March	
El día que me quieras	Enrique Cahen Salaberry	17 April	
Don Segundo Sombra	Manuel Antín	14 August	
Eloy	Humberto Ríos	23 October	
La fiaca	Fernando Ayala	6 March	
Flor de piolas	Rubén W. Cavallotti	28 May	
Fuiste mía un verano	Eduardo Calcagno	3 July	
Hermógenes Cayo (Imaginero)	Jorge Prelorán	30 January	
H - Z
Invasión	Hugo Santiago	16 October	
Kuma Ching	Daniel Tinayre	19 June	
Los muchachos de antes no usaban gomina	Enrique Carreras	13 March	
El profesor hippie	Fernando Ayala	31 July	
¡Qué noche de casamiento!	Julio Porter	28 August	
Quiero llenarme de tí	Emilio Vieyra	8 May	
El salame	Fernando Siro	21 August	
Soluna	Marcos Madanes	6 March	
Players vs. ángeles caídos	Alberto Fischerman	11 June	
Tiro de gracia	Ricardo Becher	2 October	
La vida continúa	Emilio Vieyra	4 September	
¡Viva la vida!	Enrique Carreras	2 October	

== External links and references ==
- Argentine films of 1969 at the Internet Movie Database
