= Cuesta abajo =

Cuesta abajo may refer to:

- Downward Slope (Spanish:Cuesta abajo) is a 1934 American-Argentine musical film directed by Louis J. Gasnier and starring Carlos Gardel
- Cuesta abajo, 1995 film with Héctor Anglada
- "Cuesta abajo", tango by Gardel
