= El día que me quieras =

El día que me quieras may refer to:

- "El día que me quieras" (song), a 1934 song by Carlos Gardel
- El día que me quieras (film), a 1935 American Spanish-language musical starring Carlos Gardel
- El día que me quieras (1969 film), an Argentine film of 1969
- El día que me quieras (1986 film), an Argentine film of 1986
