= Washstand =

Piece of furniture

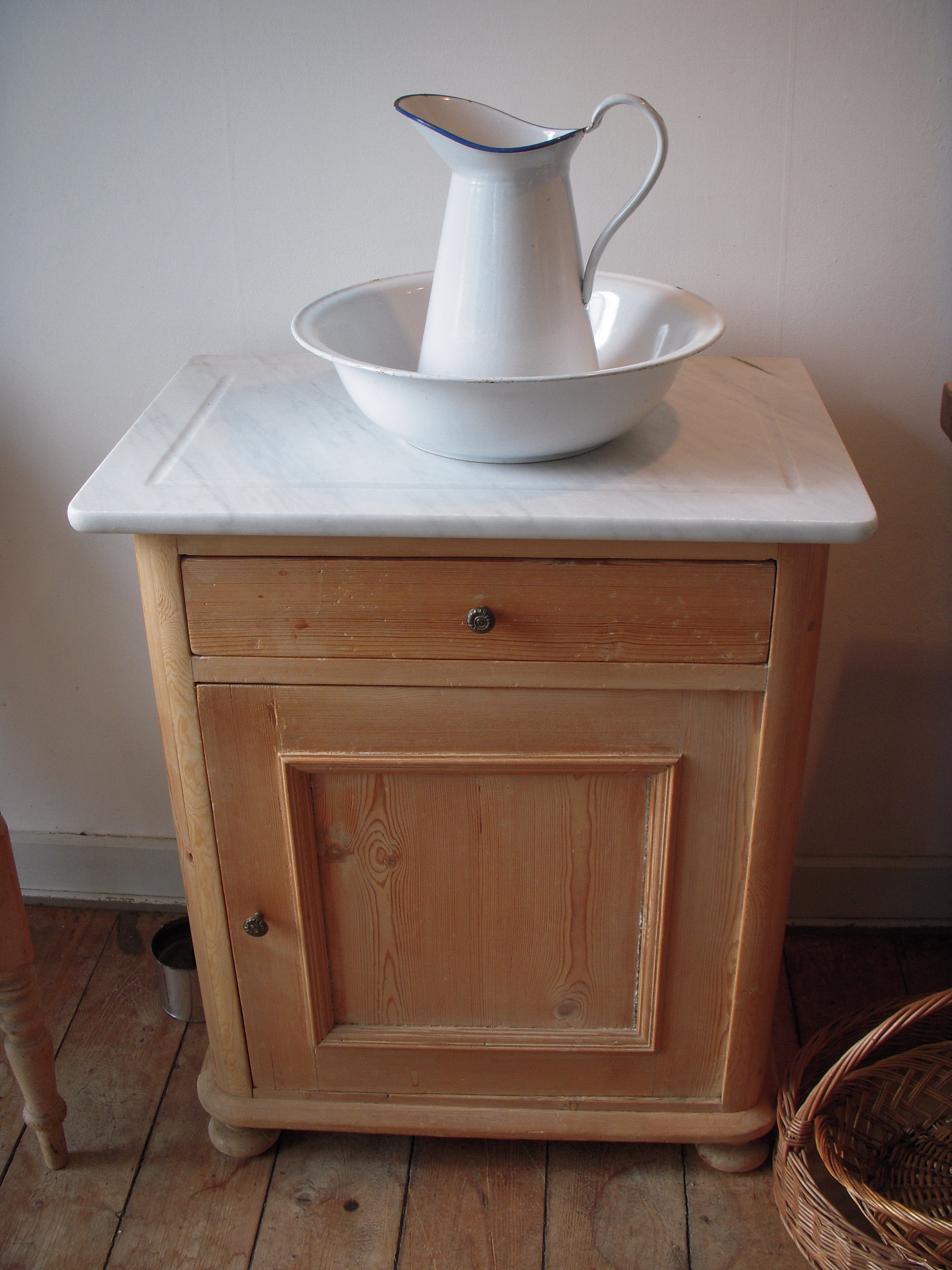
A simple marble-topped washstand

A washstand or basin stand is a piece of furniture consisting of a small table or cabinet, usually supported on three or four legs, and most commonly made of mahogany, walnut, or rosewood, and made for holding a wash basin and water pitcher. The smaller varieties were used for rose-water ablutions, or for hair-powdering. The larger ones, which possessed receptacles for soap dishes, were the predecessors of the modern bathroom wash basin, or sink. Both varieties, often of very elegant form, were in extensive use throughout a large part of the 18th century and early-19th century, eventually disappearing with the advent of modern indoor plumbing.

== Ancient Greece ==
In his Pneumatics, (chapter 31) Philo of Byzantium, a Greek engineer and writer on mechanics, describes an escapement mechanism, the earliest known, as part of a washstand. A counterweighted spoon, supplied by a water tank, tips over in a basin when full releasing a pumice in the process. Once the spoon has emptied, it is pulled up again by the counterweight, closing the door on the pumice by the tightening string. Remarkably, Philon's comment that "its construction is similar to that of clocks" indicates that such escapement mechanisms were already integrated in ancient water clocks.

== Eighteenth century ==
In its 18th-century form the washstand was called a basin stand or basin frame, and is still sometimes described as a washhand stand. Its direct, but remote, ancestor was the monastic lavabo, ranges of basins of stone, lead or marble fed from a cistern (tank). They were usually of primitive conception, and a trough common to all was probably more frequent than separate basins. Very occasionally they were of bronze adorned with enamels and blazoned with heraldry.

Very similar usages obtained in castles and palaces, fixed "lavatories" being constructed in the thickness of the walls for the use of their more important residents. These arrangements were obviously intended only for the summary ablutions which, until a very late date, sufficed to even the high-born.

By degrees the lavabo became portable, and a basin frame is mentioned as early as the middle of the 17th century. Examples of earlier date than the third or fourth decade of the 18th century are, however, virtually unknown. Thenceforth, until about the end of that century, this piece of furniture was usually literally a stand. It was supported upon a tripod; a circular orifice in the top received the basin, and smaller ones were provided for a soap dish and a water-bottle. Sometimes a stand for the water-jug when the basin was in use was provided below, and very commonly there was a drawer, sometimes even two drawers, below the basin.

Great numbers of these stands were made to fit into corners, and a corner wash-stand is still a common object in old furniture shops. Thomas Chippendale designed such stands in an elaborate rococo fashion, as well as in simpler form.

As the 18th century drew to its close the custom of using the same apartment as reception room by day and sleeping room by night produced a demand for what was called harlequin furniture pieces which were contrived a double or triple debt to pay. Thus a variety of complicated combination washstands and dressing tables were made, and fitted with mirrors and sometimes with writing conveniences and drawers for clothes. Thomas Sheraton developed astonishing ingenuity in devising a type of furniture which, if we may judge by the large number of examples still existing, must have become highly popular.

== Nineteenth and early twentieth centuries ==
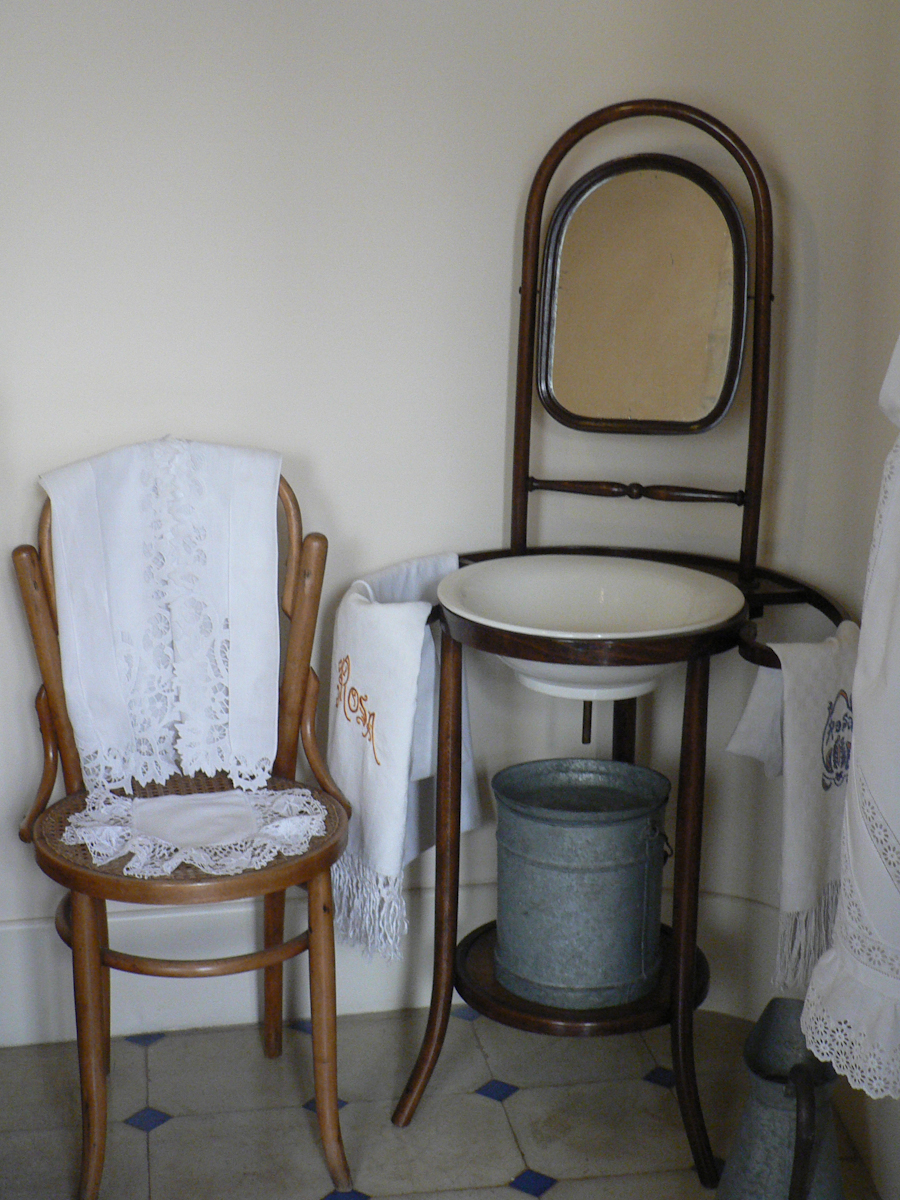
WLM14ES - Barcelona Piso 1497 07 de julio de 2011 -

With the beginning of the 19th century and the expansion of ideals of personal cleanliness, the washstand grew in size and importance. It acquired the form of an oblong wooden table provided, like its smaller predecessors, with orifices for basins and fitted with a brad shelf-like stretcher upon which the jugs were placed when they were removed from the basins. Ample space was provided for soap-dishes and water-bottles. These tables were single or double, for the use of one or two persons. In the first quarter of the 20th century, the wooden top of the washstand was replaced by marble, unpierced, the basins being placed upon the slab, which, in the beginning almost invariably white, were later made of red or other warm-tinted marble.
