= You Only Live Once (2017 film) =

- Spanish: Sólo se vive una vez
- Directed by: Federico Cueva
- Written by: Sergio Esquenazi; Axel Kuschevatzky; Mariana Busetto
- Produced by: Axel Kuschevatzky
- Starring: Juan Pedro Lanzani; Gérard Depardieu; Santiago Segura; Hugo Silva
- Cinematography: Guillermo Nieto
- Edited by: Fran Amaro
- Music by: Alfonso González Aguilar
- Production companies: DirecTV; INCAA; Telefe; Axel Kuschevatzky MyS Producción; Bowfinger Int. Pictures; Quexito Films
- Distributed by: Buena Vista International (Argentina); A Contracorriente Films (Spain)
- Release dates: June 15, 2017 (Argentina); October 12, 2017 (Spain)
- Running time: 90 minutes
- Countries: Argentina; Spain
- Languages: Spanish; French
- Budget: $ 2.000.000 million
- Box office: $ 493.374 thousand

You Only Live Once (Spanish: Sólo se vive una vez) is a 2017 Argentine-Spanish action comedy satire film directed by Federico Cueva and starring Juan Pedro Lanzani, Gérard Depardieu, Santiago Segura and Hugo Silva.

== Plot ==
Leonardo Andrade (Juan Pedro Lanzani) is the wrong man in the wrong place at the wrong time. After taping a murder and keeping the evidence he runs away to stay alive and, in order to survive, he has to cover up himself. Under a new identity he will become an orthodox Hasidic Jew. A French ruthless killer, Duges (Gérard Depardieu) and his associates Tobías López (Santiago Segura) and Harken (Hugo Silva) will hunt Leo. Their nonstop chase has only one exhilarating speed. Time is running out and his enemies are getting closer. Now Leo a ragtag bunch of misfits will face the biggest challenge of their lives.

== Cast ==
- Juan Pedro Lanzani as Leonardo Andrade
- Santiago Segura as Tobías López
- Carlos Areces as Sergio González Peña
- Gérard Depardieu as Duges
- Hugo Silva as Harken
- María Eugenia Suárez as Flavia
- Pablo Rago as Agustín
- Darío Lopilato as Yosi
- Pablo Cedrón as Olivera
- Luis Brandoni as Mendi
- Alejandro Fiore as Seagal
- Arancha Martí as Sara Kreiner
- Adryano Matianellu as Juan
- Walter Donado as Arzola
- Naim Sibara as Van Damme
- Pepe Monje as Fireman
- Iván Steinhardt as Policeman

== Production ==
The original script was written by Sergio Esquenazi under the name Kosher Bullets. The idea for the script comes from his experiences at a Chabad House in Westwood, Los Angeles. Some of the characters like Rabbi Mendi were based on real Chabad people. Sergio is a big fan of the rock group Kiss, and he wrote the main character (Lanzani) as a staunch fanatic of the band. The script is actually an adaptation of Kosher Bullets, which was an action comedy and was adapted to a satire by Nicolás Allegro, Mili Roque Pitt and Axel kuschevatzky. I Was Made For Lovin' You, iconic Kiss song, is the music for the official trailer.
