= Diego Alonso Gómez =

Argentine actor

- Born: Diego Alonso Gómez; 10 March 1972 (age 54); Buenos Aires, Argentina
- Occupation: Actor
- Years active: 1995–present

Diego Alonso Gómez (born 10 March 1972) is an Argentine actor, mostly known for his roles in telenovelas. He rose to fame for his starring role as Sergio "El Pollo" in the 2000 Canal 7 series Okupas.

== Early life ==
Alonso Gómez was born in the Caballito neighbourhood of Buenos Aires on 10 March 1972 to a family of Cape Verdean and Tehuelche descent. One of his earliest non-actoral jobs was as a bouncer at the Pinar de Rocha nightclub in Ramos Mejía.

== Career ==
Alonso Gómez's first roles were in the Canal 9 telenovelas La Nena and Por siempre mujercitas. He would later feature in minor roles in different productions at Telefe and El Trece. His breakthrough role would be as a co-star in the 2000 Canal 7 series Okupas, where he played the part of Sergio "El Pollo", part of a group of squatters at an abandoned house in Downtown Buenos Aires. Alonso has stated he had to quit his side-job at an ice cream store to fully dedicate himself to shooting Okupas. Okupas would go on to become an Argentine cult classic, and his performance as "El Pollo" earned him a Martín Fierro Award in 2001.

After his Okupas success, in 2002, he was part of the main cast of the América TV miniseries Tumberos, where he played the part of Jorge Artigas "Rada", and the El Trece series 099 Central. He continued to feature in secondary roles in various telenovelas and films, including Chronicle of an Escape and Agua (2006). From 2005 to 2006, he was a co-host of the El Trece investigative journalism show La liga, opposite Daniel Malnatti and María Julia Oliván. From 2007 to 2010, he hosted Cárceles, a docu-series run by Telefe showing the life of various people in prison. In 2008, he played a role in the Spanish-Argentine film Winter Visitor.

In 2016, he played the role of Fabián Suárez in the Martín Fierro-winning Telefe telenovela La Leona, and in 2017 he featured in the Televisión Pública series Cuéntame cómo pasó. He also had minor roles in the 2019 Telefe adaptation of To Catch a Thief, Atrapa a un ladrón, and the 2021 Amazon Prime biopic series Maradona: Blessed Dream.

== Filmography ==
=== Film ===
Year	Title	Role	Notes
2002	Natural		Single-episode appearance
2002	Robinson interior	Juan	Short
2004	El 48	Embarazado	
2006	Chronicle of an Escape	Lucas	
2006	Agua	Jorge	
2007	Número 8	Lorenzo	Main role
2008	Winter Visitor	Pichi	
2015	Zanjas	Zamora	
2015	Pasaje de vida	Pinto	
2016	Leviatan	Lorenzo Cupari	Main role
2020	La sombra del gallo	Bellomo	
2021	Quemar las naves	Ricardo	Main role
2021	3 A.M.		Short

=== Television ===
Year	Title	Role	Notes
1995	La Nena	Franco	Single-episode appearance
1996	Por siempre mujercitas	Tomás	Single-episode appearance
1997	Naranja y media	Roki	Single-episode appearance
1998	La nocturna	Antonio	
1999	Buenos vecinos	Nicolás	
2000	Okupas	Sergio "El Pollo"	Main role
2001	Poné a Francella	Gino	Single-episode appearance
2001	Cuatro amigas	Máximo	Single-episode appearance
2002	Rebelde Way	Martín	Single-episode appearance
2002	Tumberos	Jorge Artigas "Rada"	Main role
2002	Ciudad de pobres corazones	Ricardo	
2002	099 Central	Raúl	
2003	Disputas	Fredy	
2004	Los Roldán	Roberto Aguirre	
2005	1/2 falta	El Turco	Single-episode appearance
2005	Botines	Abel	Single-episode appearance
2005	Doble vida	Tito	Single-episode appearance
2005–2007	La liga	Himself	Co-host
2006	Hermanos y detectives	Secuaz	Single-episode appearance
2006	Casados con hijos	Rolo	Single-episode appearance
2007	Mujeres asesinas 3	Cristian	Single-episode appearance
2007–2010	Cárceles	Himself	Host
2008	Mujeres asesinas 4	Manuel	Single-episode appearance
2011	Maltratadas	Poncho	Single-episode appearance
2011	Proyecto aluvión	Raldez	Single-episode appearance
2012	Presentes	Estefi's dad	
2013	Taxxi, amores cruzados	"El cobre"	
2013	Sos mi hombre	Garza "Garcés"	
2013	Farsantes	Alberto's friend	Single-episode appearance
2014	Sres. Papis	Ezequiel Torres	
2015	La casa	Franco	Single-episode appearance
2015	Milagros en campaña	David	Single-episode appearance
2015	Conflictos modernos	Leandro	Single-episode appearance
2016	La Leona	Fabián Suárez	Main role
2016–2017	Por amarte así	Gastón Núñez	
2017	Cuéntame cómo pasó	Leopoldo	
2018	Pasado de Copas: Drunk History	Lavalle	Single-episode appearance
2019	Atrapa a un ladrón	Raúl Villegas	
2020	El secretario		Three episodes
2021	Maradona, sueño bendito	Osvaldo	
