= Allá lejos y hace tiempo =

Allá lejos y hace tiempo may refer to:

- Back Long Ago, a 1969 Argentine film
- Far Away and Long Ago, a 1978 Argentine film
