= Bruno Stagnaro =

Argentine film and television director, producer and screenwriter

Bruno Stagnaro (born June 15, 1973) is an Argentine film and television director, producer and screenwriter. He works mainly in the cinema of Argentina. He has also acted professionally a few times. He is the son of filmmaker Juan Bautista Stagnaro.

== Filmography ==
=== Film ===
- Guarisove, los olvidados (1995)
- Pizza, birra, faso (1998) aka Pizza, Beer, and Cigarettes (co-directed)
- Historias de Argentina en vivo (2001)

=== Television ===
- Okupas (2000)
- Vientos de agua (2006)
- Un gallo para Esculapio (2017)
- El Eternauta (2025)

== Awards ==
Wins

- Fribourg International Film Festival: FIPRESCI Prize; Israel Adrián Caetano and Bruno Stagnaro, for a first feature by two young directors who dramatise with force and without sentimentality the predicament of the teenage marginals of Argentina; and Grand Prix, for Pizza, birra, faso; 1998.
- Gramado Film Festival: Golden Kikito; Best Director, Best Film, Best Screenplay, for Pizza, birra, faso; 1998. Shared with Israel Adrián Caetano.
- Toulouse Latin America Film Festival: Grand Prix; for Pizza, birra, faso; 1998. Shared with Israel Adrián Caetano.
- Argentine Film Critics Association Awards: Silver Condor; Best First Film, for Pizza, birra, faso; 1999.
