= Soap dish =

Container of a bar of soap

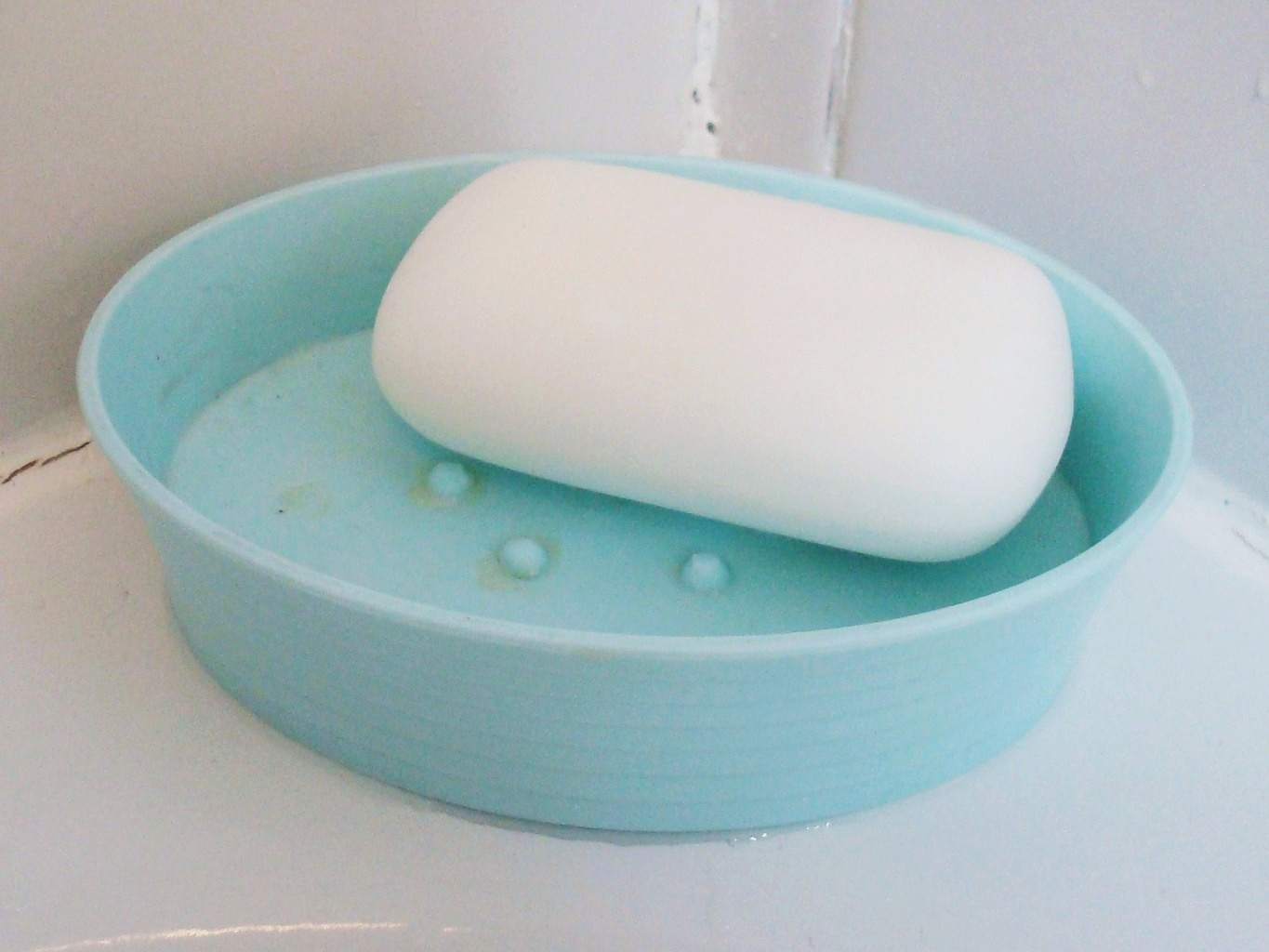
A cyan soap dish holds a bar of soap while it dries

A soap dish is a shallow, open container or platform where a bar of soap may be placed to dry after use. Soap dishes are usually located in or near a sink, shower, or bathtub. Most soap dishes are made from waterproof materials such as plastic, ceramic, metal, or glass, though some are made from bamboo. A china saucer or sponge may serve as a soap dish. A soap dish accommodates bar soap, whereas a soap dispenser accommodates liquid soap or foam soap.

== Design elements ==
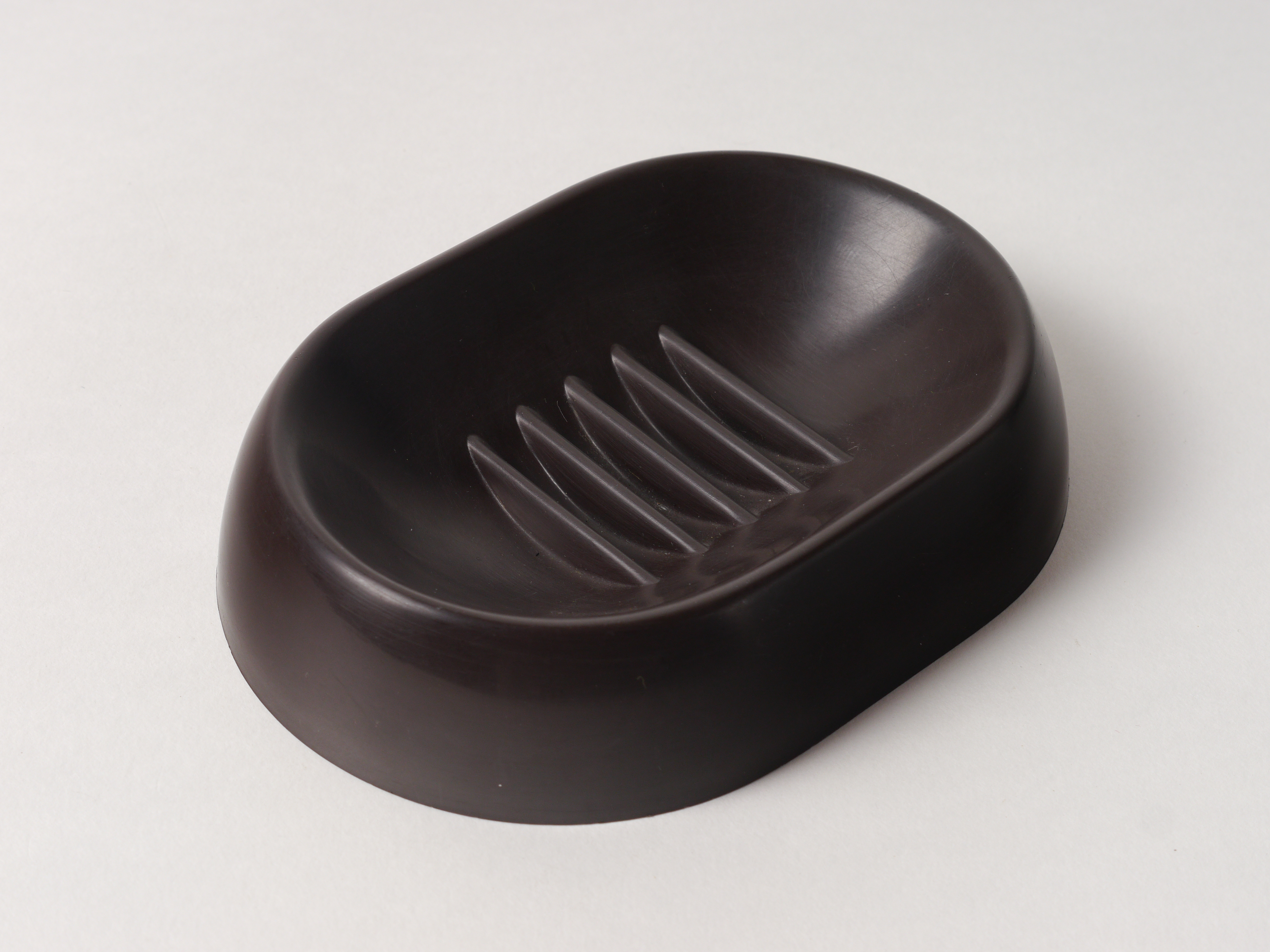
Soap dish from the brand Cecy (from the collection of The Museum of Industry in Ghent)

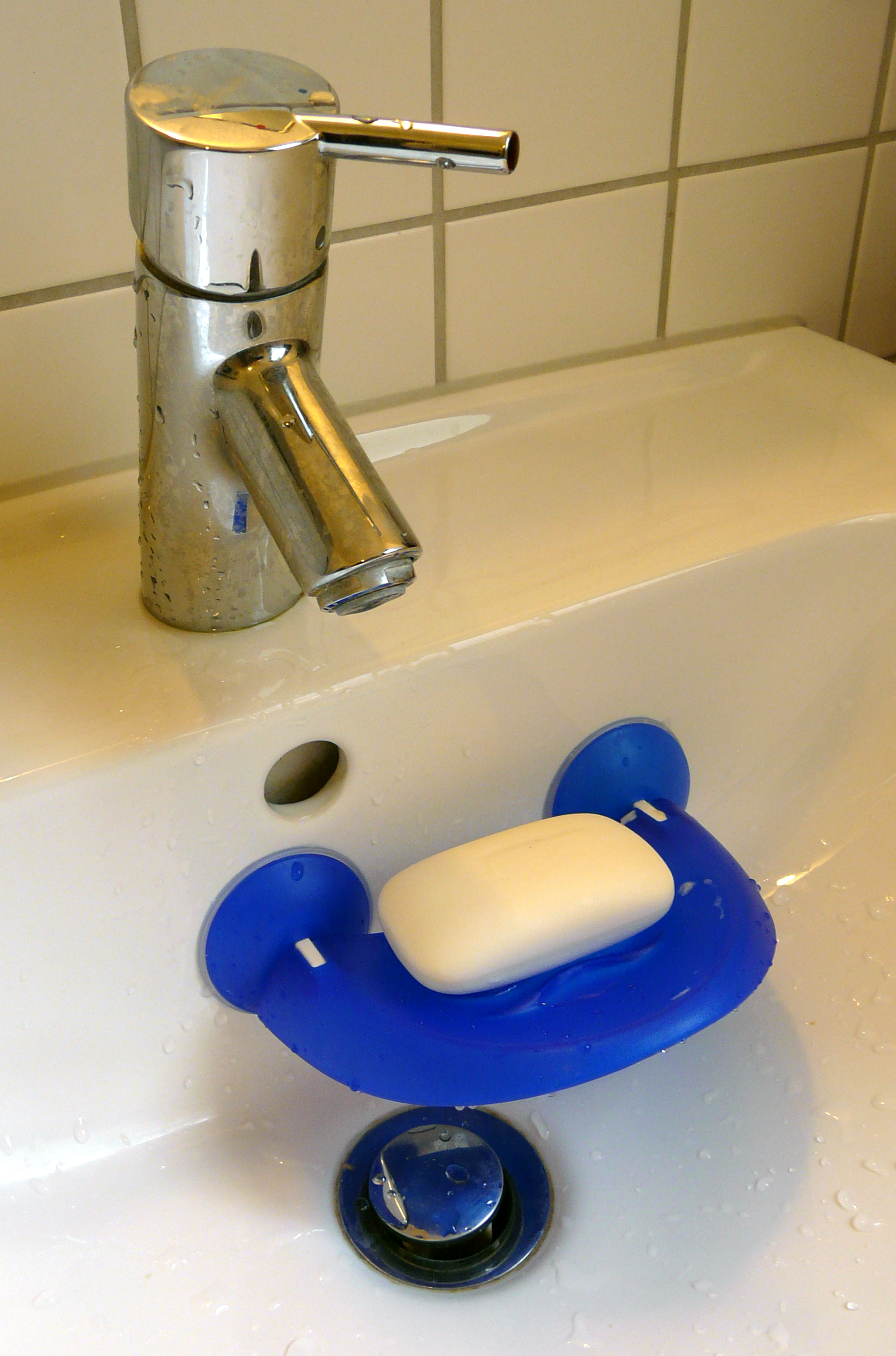
An unbreakable plastic soap dish with ventilating ridges, self-draining contours, and suction cup attachment

Elements in the design of a soap dish include safety, ventilation, cleanliness, placement, aesthetics, and cost. When a soap dish is part of a bath accessories set, a coordinated group design may be utilized. Notable soap dish designs include Leonard L Hierath's May 2018 US Patent #US-9962042 Article Support (soap dish) US Patent and Trademark Office; Robert A. Pitton's 1956 US patent for a reversible, hemispherical soap dish and Bernard Cohen's October 2017 design for the "SoapAnchor" (patent pending).

=== Safety ===
Because of their intended use in wet and potentially hazardous environments, most soap dishes are designed with safety in mind. Such features include unbreakable materials, non-slip surfaces, rounded edges, and secure installation elements (e.g., wall mount hardware, a suction cup, or non-skid feet). Depositing or retrieving a slippery bar of soap is facilitated by an open (or semi-open) sided design or by a shallow lip.

=== Ventilation ===
A bar of wet soap relies on ventilation to dry. A number of design elements may be used to increase ambient airflow around the soap, including vented surfaces or surfaces interspersed with bumps, ridges, or slats. Mechanical ventilation has not yet become a widespread design element in soap dishes.

=== Cleanliness ===
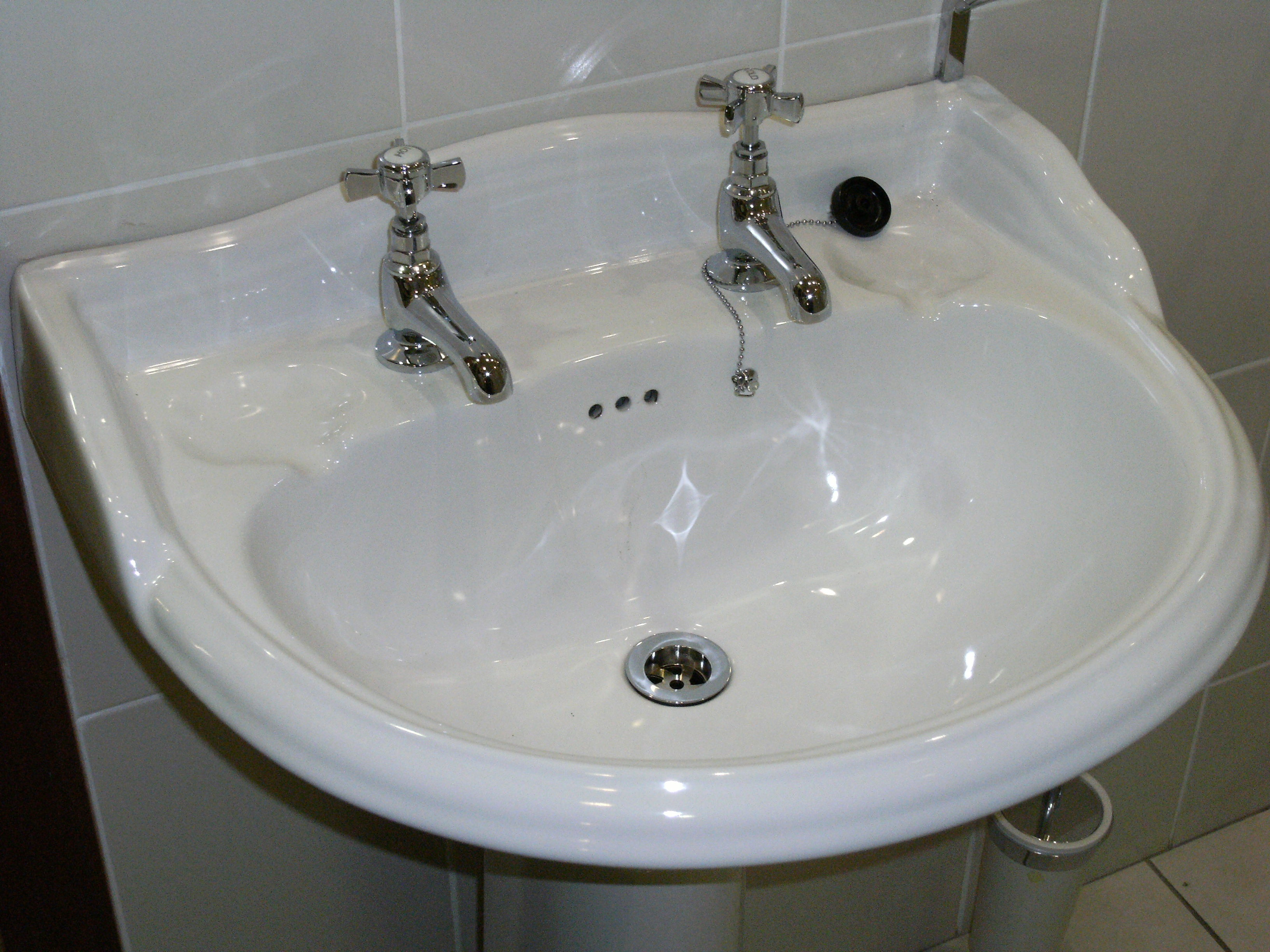
A sink with two built-in soap dishes (aside the faucets)

Because of their association with hand washing and hygiene, soap dishes themselves are often the focus of cleanliness. To aid in cleanup, some self-draining soap dishes are designed to allow soapy residue to collect in a compartment below the raised bar of soap. Other such soap dishes funnel the soapy residue directly to the adjacent sink or bathtub, necessitating strategic placement of the soap dish.

=== Placement ===
Most soap dishes are standalone accessories whose placement is at the user's discretion, though some are a built-in feature of a sink, shower, or bathtub. Standalone soap dishes may be entirely portable or may include options for semi-permanent or permanent installation on a horizontal or vertical surface. Locating a soap dish outside the perimeter of a faucet's or showerhead's stream helps the soap to avoid excess erosion.

=== Aesthetics ===
Though utilitarian in purpose, soap dishes may be given aesthetic treatment. A soap dish in the form of a whale, for example, was patented in 1961 by Sonia Adelson, with "the mouth portion thereof being adapted to receive and dispense a bar of soap in an amusing, novel and useful manner". Another example is the "Bodoni Soap Dish", a February 2013 design by David Strauss that was inspired by the legacy of Massimo Vignelli.

== History ==
A soap dish played a role in a seminal event in the 7th century when Byzantine Emperor Constans II (630-668) was assassinated with one.

A classified ad that appeared on 25 March 1820 in the Sydney [Australia] Gazette and New South Wales Advertiser lists auction items that include soap dishes. The Oxford English Dictionary gives a later "first evidence of use" for the term soap-dish as 1837 (in The Pickwick Papers by Charles Dickens).

A pewter soap dish made in Meriden, Connecticut between 1807 and 1835 is in the collection of the Metropolitan Museum of Art. An 1887 medical journal discusses an operating table that includes a built-in soap dish and an 1892 book on industrial arts shows a soap dish attachment for a scrub bucket. A toy porcelain soap dish likely from the 1890s was unearthed by archaeologist Laurie A. Wilkie at the Oakley Plantation in Louisiana. Wilkie explains in detail the facts surrounding this soap dish that led her to interpret it to be "a little material embodiment of someone's love for a child". By the late 19th century, Sears Roebuck & Company was influencing the spread of the soap dish in American households.

A pocket-sized metal soap dish emblazoned with two crossed swords that were in use during World War I (1914-1918) is in the special collections of the Pritzker Military Museum & Library. In 1919, Witter Bynner immortalized a soap dish in his poem entitled I Evade, which is reproduced here in its entirety: "The look in your eyes / Was as soft as the underside of soap in a soap-dish … / And I left before you could love me."

A gold-plated soap dish was one of over 60 artifacts from Saddam Hussein's private airport and palace that were returned to Iraq by the US government in March 2015 as part of an Iraqi national project to preserve its cultural heritage.
