= Revolución: el cruce de los Andes =

- Film Poster
- Written by: Andrés Maiño; Leandro Ipiña
- Directed by: Leandro Ipiña
- Starring: Rodrigo de la Serna; Juan Ciancio; León Dogodny; Lautaro Delgado
- Narrated by: Juan Carlos Gené
- Theme music composer: Sebastián Escofet; Gustavo Santaolalla
- Country of origin: Argentina
- Original language: Spanish

Production
- Producers: Marina Bacin; Gustavo Villamagna; Leandro Borrell
- Cinematography: Javier Julia
- Editor: Alejandro Brodersohn
- Running time: 95 min.
- Production companies: Canal 7 Encuentro; INCAA (funding); TVE

Original release
- Release: April 7, 2010

Revolución: el cruce de los Andes (English: Revolution: The Crusade of the Andes) is a 2010 Argentine historical epic film directed by Leandro Ipiña and starring Rodrigo de la Serna. It premiered during the bicentennial of Argentina. It was initially named San Martín: el cruce de los Andes.

The film follows the life of José de San Martín, with special focus on the Crossing of the Andes. Production was done by Channel 7 and Channel Encuentro. It was premiered in Mar del Plata on November 15, 2010.

== Synopsis ==
The story starts in 1880, near the date when the remains of the deceased José de San Martín were moved to Buenos Aires. Manuel Corvalán, a veteran of the Army of the Andes gets interviewed for the event, and the narration continues mostly through flashbacks, following a very young Manuel, who gets a job as the secretary of San Martín and accompanies him during a journey in which he witnessed two of the most important events in Argentine history: the Crossing of the Andes and the later Battle of Chacabuco.

== Cast ==
- Rodrigo de la Serna ... José de San Martín
- Juan Ciancio ... Manuel Corvalán (young)
  - León Dogodny ... Manuel Corvalán (old)
- Lautaro Delgado ... Journalist
- Victor Hugo Carrizo ... Villagrán
- Pablo Ribba ... Fray Aldao
- Alberto Morle ... Sargento Blanco
- Guillermo Kuchen ... Mayor Luna
- Alberto Ajaka ... Álvarez Condarco
- Matías Marmorato ... Fray García
- Abel Ezequiel Arabales ... Chasqui
- Martín Rodríguez ... Soler
- Corina Romero ... Landlady
- Javier Olivera ... Bernardo O’Higgins
- Alfredo Castellani ... Corvalán's Father
- Ana Gutiérrez ... Remedios de Escalada
- Lucrecia Oviedo ... Corvalán's Mother
- Juan Carlos Gené ... Narrator

== Production ==
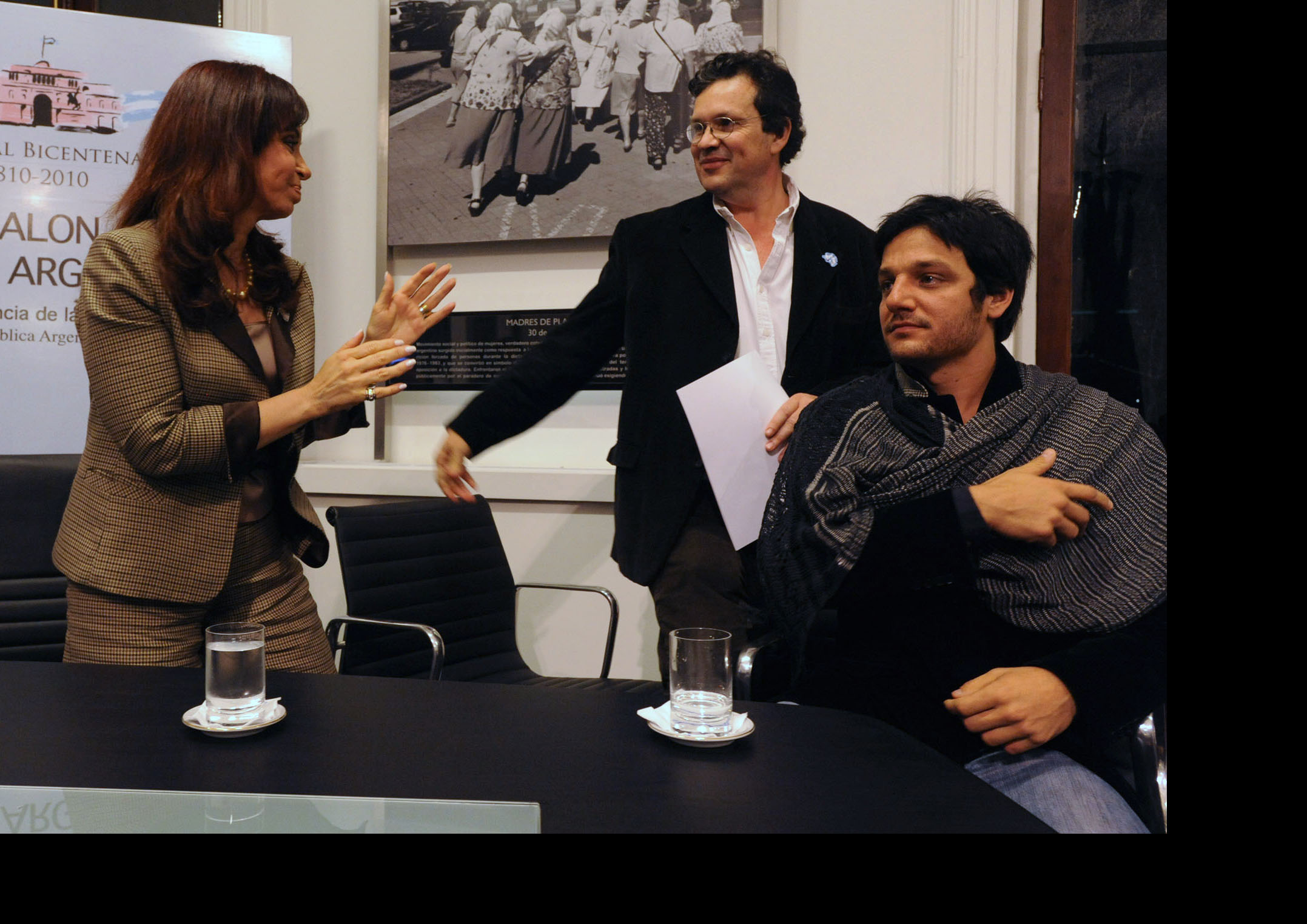
President Cristina Fernández de Kirchner with Tristán Bauer and Rodrigo de la Serna in the official presentation of the film

The production of the movie was announced at Casa Rosada, with the presence of President Cristina Fernández de Kirchner, the governor of the province of San Juan, José Luis Gioja, Minister of Education Juan Carlos Tedesco, the director of the National System of Public Media, Tristán Bauer, and actor Rodrigo de la Serna.

At the announcement, the President stated that "this is a very special moment for everyone because addressing from public television the Crossing the Andes is more than just remember a milestone in the struggle for emancipation." She explained that the movie would focus on the personal traits of San Martin, and pointed that if San Martín "had listened to the voices who say that nothing can be done, that everything is impossible, he would still be in Mendoza and we would be subjects of the King of Spain.".

The filming started on June 1 of 2009 at the Calingasta valley in the province of San Juan, with a crew of more than 100 people. Along with de la Serna, there were 15 principal actors in the film, and more than 1400 extras. The scenes filmed in Mendoza ended up being shot the following August.
