= Sergio Esquenazi =

Argentine filmmaker (born 1974)

- Born: Sergio Esquenazi; 1974 (age 50–51); Buenos Aires, Argentina
- Occupation(s): Film director, screenwriter

Sergio Esquenazi (Buenos Aires, Argentina, 27 October 1974) is an Argentine filmmaker. His films combine the genres of horror and psychological thriller.

== Biography ==
He began his career at the age of 20 directing commercials in the United States. Back home he wrote and directed TV series where he worked with actors such as Norman Briski, Juan Gil Navarro, Alejandro Awada, among others. In 2004 he shot his first feature film, Dead Line, which was made in English and distributed in over 30 countries. After Dead Line he directed Bone Breaker (2005) also in English.

His first feature film in Spanish was the Argentinean-Spanish production Winter Visitor (2008), the first horror film to be released commercially in Argentina in two decades. This film opened the doors for Argentine directors of the genre who were finally able to release their films in their country's theaters. The film deals with themes such as madness, reincarnation and cannibalism. After Winter Visitor, he made the drama Number 8.

He works with American producer Hunt Lowry in the development of 3 projects for Werner Bros. He writes the scripts Bonavena, based on the life of Ringo Bonavena and Leyenda, based on the life of Juan Manuel Fangio and shot the film Leviathan. In 2017, the action comedy You Only Live Once is released based on his script Kosher Bullets, starring Gérard Depardieu, Peter Lanzani, Santiago Segura, Pablo Rago and Dario Lopilato.

== Filmography ==
=== Feature films ===
- Dead Line (film) (2004)
- Winter Visitor (2008)
- Number 8 (film) (2008)

=== Script ===
- You only live Once (film) (story, script) (2017)

=== Short films ===
- Un Padre para Ludwig (2003)
- Magia (2003)

=== TV ===
- Código Negro (2001), TV Series
- Encubiertos (2003), TV Series
