= Lautaro Delgado =

Argentine film and TV actor

Lautaro Delgado (Buenos Aires, 1978) is an Argentine film and TV actor. In 2006 he appeared in Crónica de una fuga and in 2010 he appeared in Revolución: El cruce de los Andes.

== Filmography ==
- 1995: Montaña rusa, otra vuelta TV Series .... Franky
- 1998: Alas, poder y pasión TV Series .... Cato
- 1998: Doña Bárbara .... Lorenzo Barquero Joven
- 1999: Verano del '98 (1998) TV Series
- 2000: Ilusiones (compartidas) TV Series .... Martín Fattone
- 2001: Un Amor en Moisés Ville
- 2004: El Topo
- 2004: Palermo Hollywood .... Enrique
- 2005: Iluminados por el fuego
- 2006: La Punta del diablo .... Franco
- 2006: Crónica de una fuga (2006)
- 2010: Aballay
- 2010: Revolución: El cruce de los Andes
- 2015: Kryptonita .... Lady Di (based on Wonder Woman)
- 2016: I'm Gilda
