= Agua (film) =

- Theatrical release poster
- Directed by: Verónica Chen
- Written by: Pablo Lago; Verónica Chen
- Produced by: Verónica Chen; Denis Freyd
- Starring: Jimena Anganuzzi
- Cinematography: Sabine Lancelin; Matías Mesa
- Edited by: Luis César D'Angiolillo; Jacopo Quadri
- Distributed by: Celluloid Dreams
- Release date: April 21, 2006 (Argentina)
- Running time: 89 minutes
- Countries: Argentina; France
- Language: Spanish

Agua (lit. 'Water'; released in the United Kingdom as Argentinian Waters) is a 2006 Argentine and French sports drama film directed and written by Verónica Chen and Pablo Lago. The film is centered on a former professional swimming champion returning to old glory in the sport.

== Cast ==
- Rafael Ferro as Goyo
- Nicolás Mateo as Chino
- Jimena Anganuzzi as Luisa
- Leonora Balcarce as Ana
- Gloria Carrá as Maria
- Edith van Dijk as herself
- Diego Alonso Gómez as Jorge

== Distribution ==
The drama premiered on April 21, 2006 in Argentina at the Buenos Aires International Festival of Independent Cinema, and opened wide in the country on September 21, 2006.

The picture was screened at various film festivals, including: the Locarno Film Festival, Switzerland; the Warsaw Film Festival, Poland; the Amiens International Film Festival, France; the Oslo International Film Festival, Norway; and others.

== Reception ==
=== Critical response ===
Robert Koehler, film critic for Variety magazine, gave the film a mixed review when reporting from the Buenos Aires Independent Film Festival. He wrote, "Pretension swallows up Water, Veronica Chen's shallow follow-up to her fine 2001 debut, Smokers Only. Bookended by a hauntingly atmospheric opening sequence and a finale that makes the central characters' involvement with marathon swimming vivid and physical, the pic has a gaping hole in the middle. Hardly different in basic outline from innumerable recent sports films about outsiders and underdogs turning their lives around, the pic's only twist is an excessively and pointlessly elliptical storytelling gambit. Fest interest will be mild at best for a film with little commercial kick."

== Awards ==
Wins

- Amiens International Film Festival, France: SIGNIS Award, Best Film, Verónica Chen; 2006.
- Locarno International Film Festival, Switzerland: Prize of the Ecumenical Jury, Verónica Chen; Youth Jury Award: Environment is Quality of Life, Verónica Chen; 2006.
- Argentine Film Critics Association Awards: Silver Condor, Best Sound, Martín Grignaschi and Federico Billordo; 2007.
- Málaga Spanish Film Festival, Spain: Silver Biznaga, Best Film, Verónica Chen; 2007.
- Palm Springs International Film Festival: New Voices/New Visions Special Jury Prize, Best Film, Verónica Chen; 2007.

Nominations

- Locarno International Film Festival: Golden Leopard, Verónica Chen; 2006.
- Marrakech International Film Festival, Morocco: Golden Star, Verónica Chen; 2006.
- Oslo Films from the South Festival: Films from the South Award, Best Feature, Verónica Chen; 2006.
- Argentine Film Critics Association Awards: Silver Condor, Best Cinematography, Sabine Lancelin and Matías Mesa; 2007.
