= Soap dispenser =

Device that dispenses soap

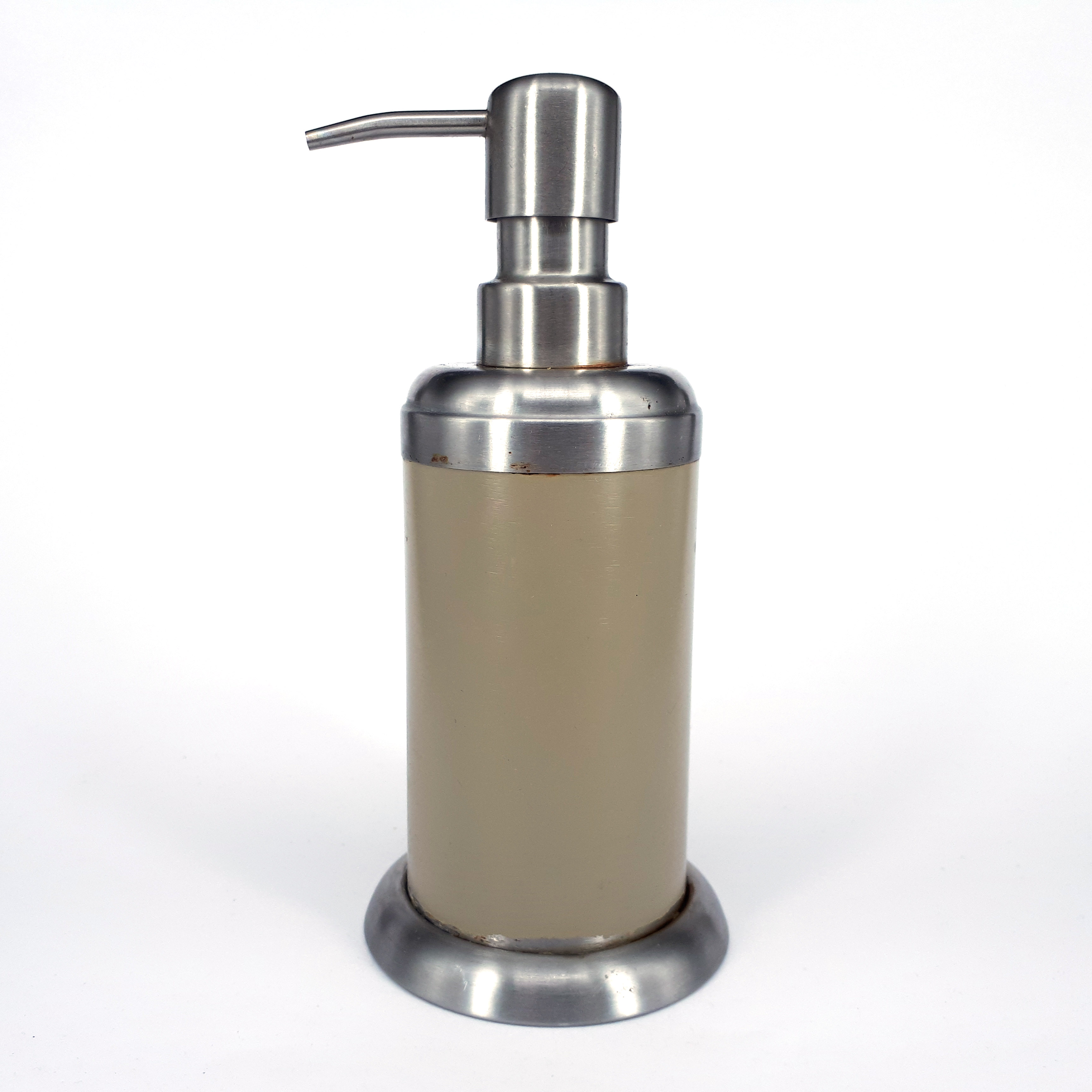

A soap dispenser is a device that, when manipulated or triggered appropriately, dispenses soap (usually in small, single-use quantities). Soap dispensers typically dispense liquid soap or foam soap. They can be automatic or manually operated by a handle and are often found in public toilets or private bathrooms.

== Manual ==
The design of a manual soap dispenser is generally determined by whether the soap comes in liquid, powder or foam form.

=== Liquid soap ===
When soap is dispensed in liquid form, it is generally in a squeeze bottle or pump. The most popular soap dispensers of this type are plastic pump bottles, many of which are disposable.

William Quick patented liquid soap on August 22, 1865. Minnetonka Corporation introduced the first modern liquid soap in 1980 and bought up the entire supply of plastic pumps used in their dispensers to delay competition entering the market.

==== Parts ====
- Actuator – This is the top of the pump from which is pressed down to get the liquid out
- Closure – Closure is the bottle that is fastened to the bottle's neck. it has a smooth or ribbed surface
- Outer gasket – Made up of plastic or rubber, it is fit inside the closure and prevents leakage
- Housing – The main pump that keeps the other components in the right place and sends liquid to the actuator from the dip tube
- Dip tube – This is the visible tube that carries liquid from the bottom of the bottle up to the housing
- Interior components – A spring, ball, piston or stem that helps move the liquid to the actuator

==== Operation ====
The handwash bottle acts much like an air suction device that draws liquid upwards to the user’s hands against the force of gravity. When the user presses down the actuator, the piston compresses the spring and upward air pressure pulls the ball upward, along with the liquid product into the dip tube and then reaches the housing. When the user releases the actuator, the spring returns the piston and actuator to the normal position and the ball returns to its earlier position to stop the backflow of the liquid back to the bottle. This process is called ‘priming' and is only used when the handwash is put in the bottle.

When the user presses the bottle again, the liquid in the housing is drawn from there and is released out of the actuator. The housing is again filled up with the handwash from the bottle, and the process goes on.

=== Dry soap ===
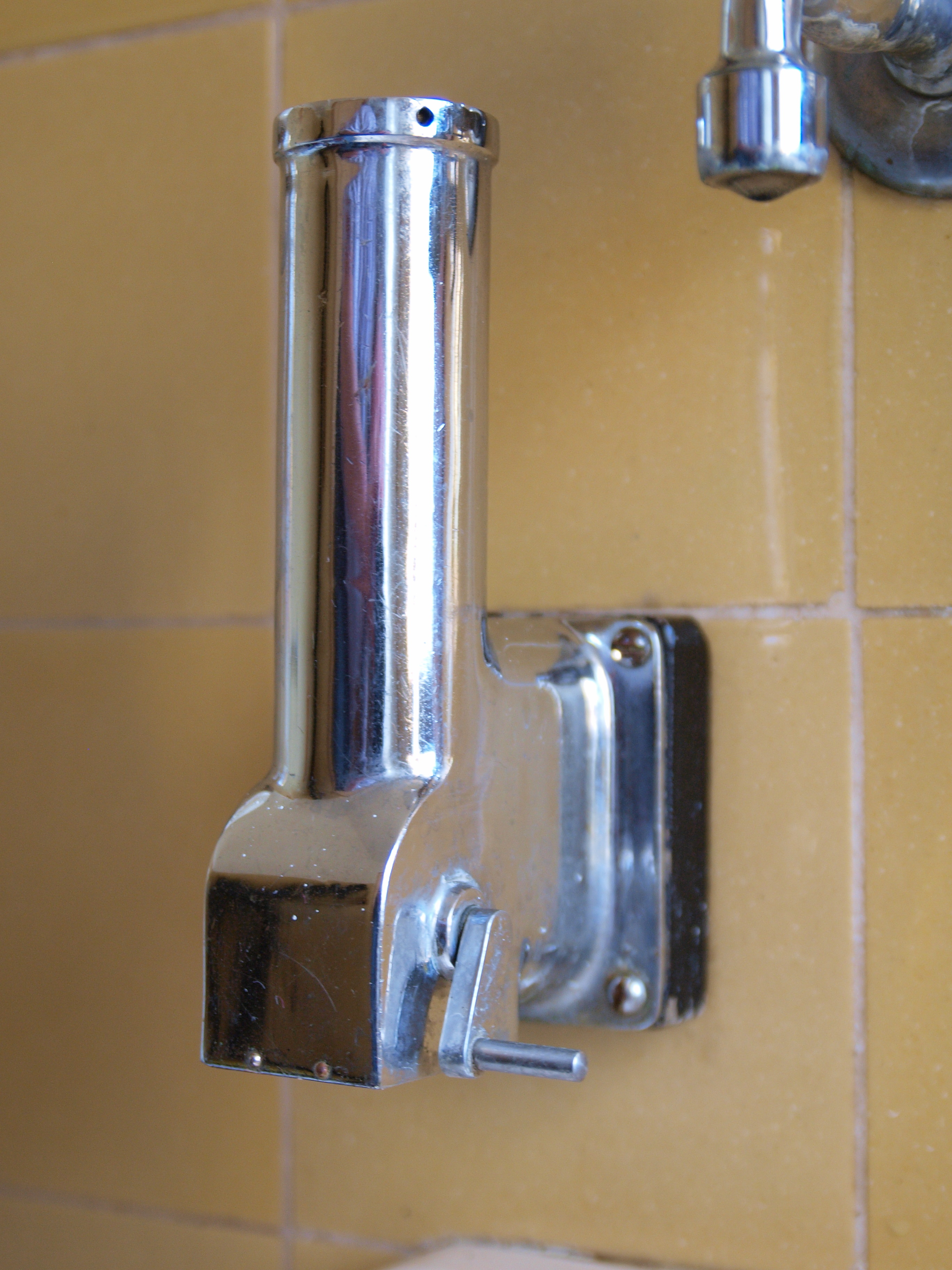
A soap mill in a public washroom.

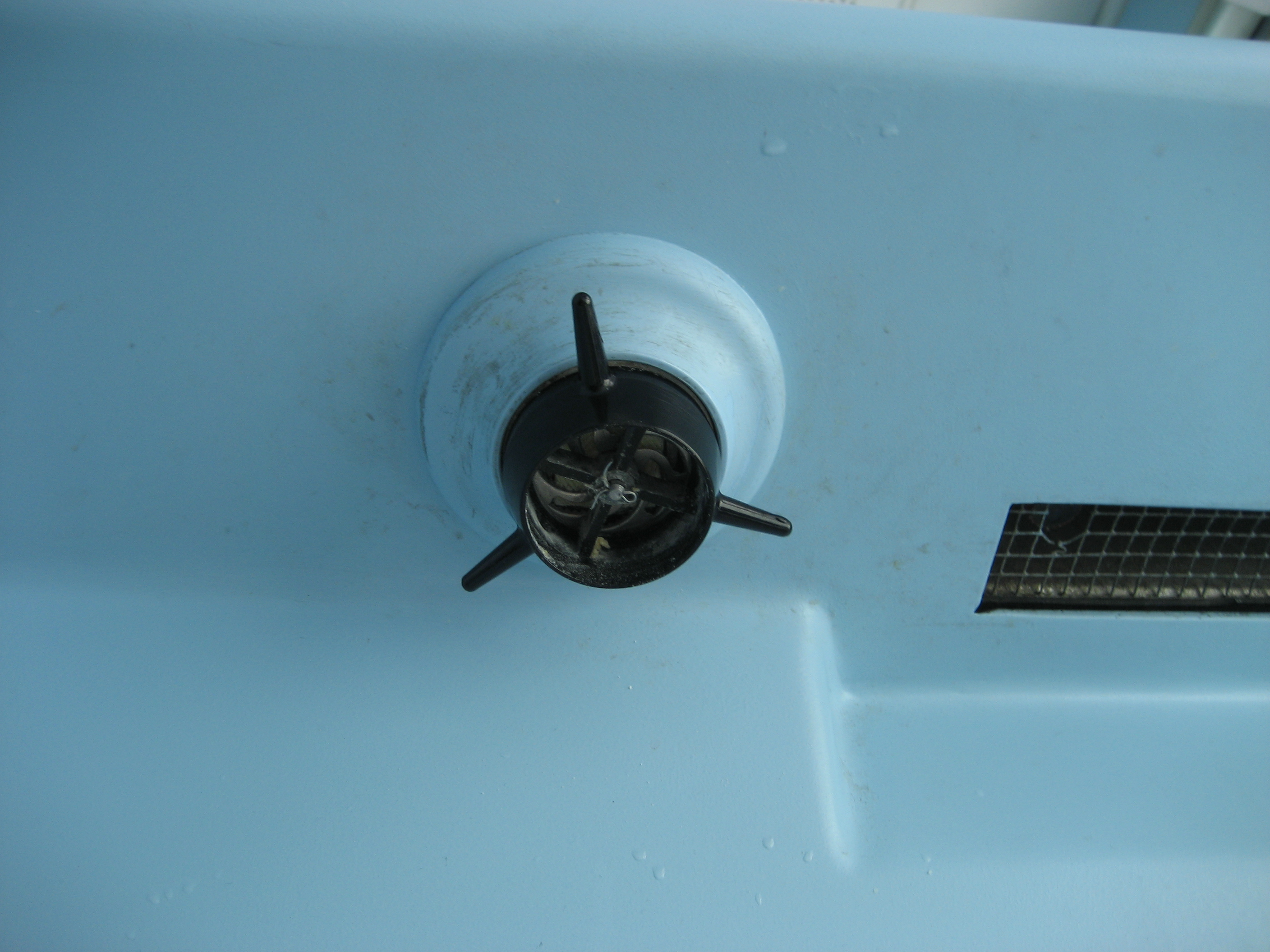
A train-washroom built-in soap mill from below. When the black spokes are rotated with one finger, the spiral blades rotate against the soap bar visible behind them and flakes of soap fall out the bottom of the device into the other hand.

Some soap dispensers grate, plane or grind solid soap bars to flakes or powder as they are dispensed. About 40 grams (1.4 oz) fresh weight of soap is equivalent to 1 liter (0.22 imp gal; 0.26 U.S. gal) of liquid soap, providing soap for up to 400 handwashings.

Soap mills are common in public washrooms in Germany. Soap graters made specifically for home use can be wall-mounted or free-standing (like a pepper grinder) and waterproof for use in a shower. Some graters take specially dimensioned soap bars, others will take a range of ordinary soap bar sizes.

Dispensers of pre-powdered soaps, such as borax, often take the form of a metal box with a weighted lever; when the lever is pressed, a handful of soap is released. Ground soap is also used to wash laundry.

=== Foam soap ===
Foam soap dispensers have dual foam pumps that when used, move both air and soap, injecting both together through small openings to create a lather. They can be found in both manual and automatic varieties.

Manual dispensers of foam soap often consist of a large button that squeezes the foam out of a tube. Many liquid soap dispensers operate in this way as well. A few dispensers operate with a lever that pulls forward and squeezes the soap out.

The majority of manual foam soap dispensers have the soap in a bladder in the dispenser in liquid form, as the pump is pressed the liquid soap is pushed through a small foaming nozzle which foams the soap.

== Automatic ==
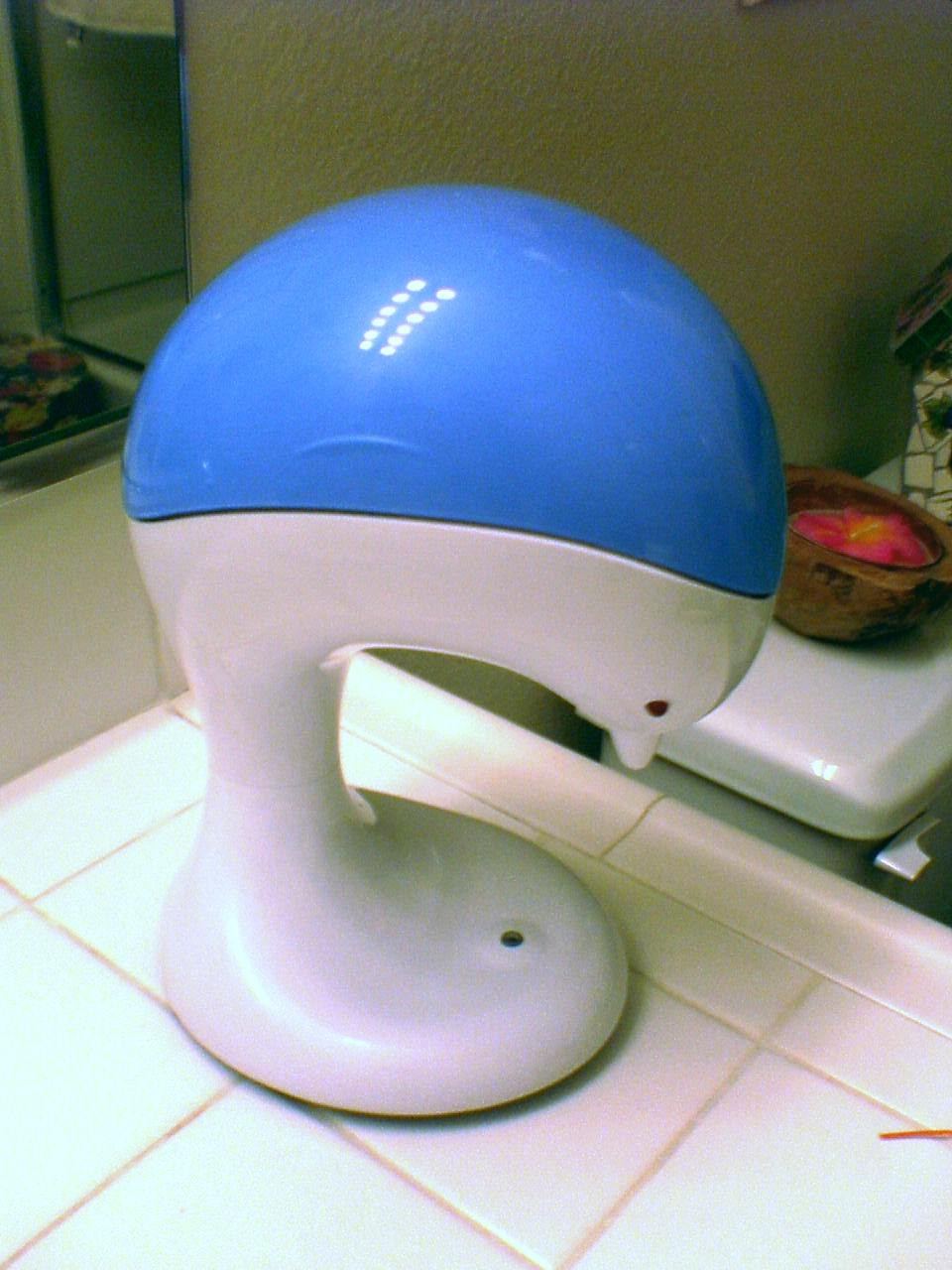
Automatic soap dispenser

An automatic soap dispenser is specifically a hands-free dispenser of liquid or foam soap, and generally can be used for other liquids such as hand sanitizers, shampoos or hand lotions. They are often battery-powered. Hands-free dispensers for water and soap/hand sanitizer have particular virtues for operating theatres and treatment rooms.

=== Mechanism ===
The touch-free design dispenses the liquid when a sensor detects motion under the nozzle. The electronic components of an automatic soap dispenser allow for a timing device or signal (sound, lights, etc.) which can indicate to the user whether they have washed their hands for the correct amount of time or not.

== See also ==
- Foam pump
- Hand washing
- Soapdish
