= Juan Carlos Gené =

Argentine actor and playwright

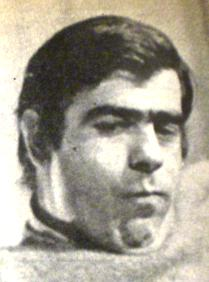
- Born: 6 November 1929; Buenos Aires, Argentina
- Died: 31 January 2012 (aged 82); Buenos Aires, Argentina
- Occupation: Actor

Juan Carlos Gené (6 November 1929 – 31 January 2012) was an Argentine actor and playwright. He was president and secretary general of the Argentine Actors Association, managing director of Canal Siete and managing director of Teatro General San Martín.

Gené narrated films like Revolución: El cruce de los Andes and wrote La Raulito. He also acted in the movies like Don Segundo Sombra and Coup de Grâce. He died in 2012.
