= Andrea Pietra =

Argentine actress

Andrea Pietra is an Argentine actress. She worked with Nancy Dupláa as the lead actresses of Socias. She suggested her to hire the actress Paola Barrientos for her new telenovela, Graduados. In 2012 she joined the telenovela Sos mi hombre.

== Works ==
=== Film ===
Film	Year
El camino de los sueños	1993
Bajo Bandera	1997
Héroes y demonios	1999
El séptimo arcángel	2003
Solos	2005
La señal	2007

=== Television ===
TV Program	Year
Así son los mios	1990
La Banda del Golden Rocket	1991
Quereme	1994
Nano	1994
Poliladron (1997)	1995
Verdad consecuencia	1996-1998
La mujer del presidente	1999
Por ese palpitar	2000
Infieles	2002
Durmiendo con mi jefe	2003
Locas de amor	2004
1/2 Falta	2005
Mujeres asesinas	2005-2007
Son de Fierro	2007
Socias	2008
Dromo	2009
Sos mi hombre	2012
The Eternaut	2025
