= Pizza, Beer, and Cigarettes =

- Theatrical release poster
- Directed by: Israel Adrián Caetano; Bruno Stagnaro
- Written by: Israel Adrián Caetano; Bruno Stagnaro
- Produced by: Bruno Stagnaro
- Starring: Héctor Anglada; Jorge Sesán; Pamela Jordán
- Cinematography: Marcelo Lavintman
- Edited by: Andrés Tambornino
- Music by: Leo Sujatovich
- Production companies: Palo y a la Bolsa Cine; Hubert Bals Fund
- Distributed by: Líder Films (Argentina); Filmfreak Distributie (Netherlands)
- Release date: 15 January 1998 (Argentina)
- Running time: 92 minutes
- Country: Argentina
- Language: Spanish

Pizza, Beer, and Cigarettes (Spanish: Pizza, birra, faso; also known as Pizza, Beer & Smokes) is a 1998 Argentine crime drama film written and directed by Israel Adrián Caetano and Bruno Stagnaro and starring Héctor Anglada, Jorge Sesan and Pamela Jordán. The film tells the story of a gang of marginalized adolescents who survive on the streets of Buenos Aires carrying out low-level robberies. Pizza, Beer, and Cigarettes is the film that's known as "the spark that ignited the New Argentine Cinema when it premiered at the international Mar del Plata Film Festival." It was filmed entirely in Buenos Aires.

In a survey of the 100 greatest films of Argentine cinema carried out by the Museo del Cine Pablo Ducrós Hicken in 2000, the film reached the 10th position. In a new version of the survey organized in 2022 by the specialized magazines La vida útil, Taipei and La tierra quema, presented at the Mar del Plata International Film Festival, the film reached the 8th position.

== Plot ==
This story takes place in an impoverished district outside Buenos Aires and follows a group of teenage delinquents and misfits: the not-so-bright Megabom (Alejandro Pous), the asthmatic Pablo (Jorge Sesán), the nerdy Frula (Walter Díaz), and Sandra (Pamela Jordan), the pregnant girlfriend of El Cordobés (Héctor Anglada). All of them are squatters living together in the same house. The group wander the city and steal in order to survive. After letting go of their former employer, a crooked taxi driver who paid them a cut of what they could steal from his passengers, Frula and Cordobés steal from a crippled street vendor, which ultimately leads to Sandra being arrested.

Sandra, because of her pregnancy, starts to think about her future and the life she can make for her expected baby. When she is released from jail after a short time inside, she makes Cordobes promise he'll straighten up and find a decent job instead of stealing again. In the meantime, she stays with her abusive father. Aided by his friends, Cordobés starts looking for more profitable scores, so he can move to Uruguay with Sandra.

Frula arranges a job with his contact, Rubén which involves stealing a fancy restaurant with unreliable guns. Rubén drives them to the spot which turns out to be an ordinary place. The stickup goes sloppily and the alarm goes off, urging the five robbers to escape. Rubén cuts ties with the others after paying Cordobes a misery for his job.

Running out of time, the group decides to rob a local nightclub. Pablo and Cordobes get back in touch with the cab driver, only to beat him up and steal both his money and his guns. However, they grow fond of the passenger, a middle aged woman from Cordoba, and let her arrive to her destination safely. Immediately after being let out of the car, the woman discreetly calls the police, who begins tracking the stolen cab. Back at the nightclub, Pablo, Frula and Cordobes get past the bouncer and proceed to hold the ticket workers at gunpoint while Pablo acts as a diversion, with Megabom as lookout outside the club. The bouncer, however, barely manages to notice Pablo and Megabom switching guns, so he begins acting more suspiciously. While the others start taking the money, Megabom notices a policeman following them, and proceeds to bother him and damage his motorbike in order to create a distraction. When Cordobes gets out of the ticket office, gun in hand, he is shot in the chest by the bouncer, who is then killed by Pablo. Hearing the screams and gunshots inside, the policeman attempts to enter the nightclub, but begins to beat down Megabom after he hits him in the back. When Frula, Cordobes and Pablo get to the cab, Frula catches a glimpse of the bloody and bruised Megabom. Enraged, he draws his gun at the officer, but is quickly shot down. Pablo manages to escape carrying a badly wounded Cordobes and steals another car. He drives him to the docks and gives him the money, so he can leave with Sandra, while staying behind to turn himself in.

Crawling, Cordobes manages to get to the docks, where he realizes he won't make it to the boat. Reunited with Sandra, he is forced to confess he didn't make good on his promise, and tells Sandra she should go alone, for the kid's sake. They kiss farewell, and a dying Cordobes manages to get a final look at Sandra while the boat departs. When the police arrive, they find his dead body and inform the station via radio.

== Cast ==
- Héctor Anglada as Córdoba/Cordobés/El Cordobés
- Jorge Sesán as Pablo
- Pamela Jordán as Sandra
- Adrián Yospe as Rubén
- Daniel Di Biase as Trompa
- Walter Díaz as Frula
- Martín Adjemián as Taxi Driver
- Elena Cánepa as Old Woman
- Rubén Rodríguez as Rengo
- Tony Lestingi as Passenger
- Alejandro Pous as Megabom
- Marcelo Videla as Cop 1
- Gustavo Saenz as Cop 2
- Claudia Moreno as Prostitute
- Roberto Alvarez as Security Guard

== Distribution ==
The producers used the following tagline to promote the film:

Four friends. One city. Only one way out.

The film first opened in Argentina on 15 January 1998.

The film was shown at various film festivals, including: the Fribourg International Film Festival, Switzerland; the Toulouse Latin America Film Festival, France; the Montevideo Film Festival, Uruguay; the Gramado Film Festival, Brazil; and the Torino International Festival of Young Cinema, Turin, Italy.

In the United States it was not released as a feature film, but rather it was released in DVD format on 27 December 2005.

== Accolades ==
Wins

- Argentine Film Critics Association Awards: Silver Condor; Best Film; Best First Film; Best New Actor, Héctor Anglada; Best Original Screenplay, Bruno Stagnaro & Adrián Caetano; 1999.
- Fribourg International Film Festival, Fribourg, Switzerland: FIPRESCI Prize, Israel Adrián Caetano and Bruno Stagnaro, for a first feature by two young directors who dramatize with force and without sentimentality the predicament of the teenage marginals of Argentina; and Grand Prix; 1998.
- Gramado Film Festival: Golden Kikito—Best Director; Best Film, Best Screenplay; Israel Adrián Caetano and Bruno Stagnaro; 1998.
- Toulouse Latin America Film Festival: Israel Adrián Caetano and Bruno Stagnaro; 1998.

Nominations

- Torino International Festival of Young Cinema, Torino, Italy: Prize of the City of Torino Best Film - International Feature Film Competition, Adrián Caetano and Bruno Stagnaro; 1998.
- Argentine Film Critics Association Awards: Silver Condor; Best Director, Bruno Stagnaro and Adrián Caetano; Best Editing, Andrés Tambornino; Best New Actor, Jorge Sesán; 1999.
