= Players vs. ángeles caídos =

- Directed by: Ricardo Becher, Nestor Paternostro, Juan José Stagnaro, Raúl de la Torre, Alberto Fischerman (director and screenplay)
- Written by: Alberto Fischerman
- Starring: Luis Barrón, Leonor Galindo, Gioia Fiorentino, Jorge Cedron, Roberto Mosca, Sergio Mulet
- Cinematography: Juan Carlos Desanzo
- Edited by: Oscár Souto
- Music by: Roberto Lar
- Release date: 1969
- Running time: 1h 22mins
- Country: Argentina
- Language: Spanish

Players vs. ángeles caídos is a 1969 Argentinian film.
