= Héctor Anglada =

Argentine actor

- Born: 31 January 1976; Villa Carlos Paz, Argentina
- Died: 2 March 2002 (aged 26); Burzaco, Argentina
- Years active: 1995–2001

Héctor Anglada (January 31, 1976 – March 2, 2002) was an Argentine film and television actor.

He died in a road accident.

== Filmography ==
- Cuesta abajo (1995)
- La Furia (1997) a.k.a. The Fury
- Mala época (1998)
- Pizza, birra, faso (1998) a.k.a. Pizza, Beer, and Cigarettes
- La Expresión del deseo (1998)
- El Camino (2000) a.k.a. The Road
- Herencia (2001) a.k.a. Inheritance
- Bolivia (2001)

== Television ==
- R.R.D.T (1997) TV Series
- Gasoleros (1998) TV Series
- Campeones de la vida (1999) TV Series a.k.a. Champions of Life
- Enamorarte (2001) TV Series a.k.a. Young Lovers

== Awards ==
Wins

- Argentine Film Critics Association Awards: Silver Condor; Best New Male Actor; for Pizza, Beer, and Cigarettes; 1999
