= Sature =

- Developer: S.S. 64 Games
- Designer: Ian Sundstrom
- Composer: Elie Abraham
- Platforms: Android, iOS, Microsoft Windows, macOS, Linux
- Release: March 18, 2015
- Genres: Board game, puzzle game
- Modes: Single-player, Multiplayer

Sature is a mobile platform video game by game development team S.S. 64 Games.

== Gameplay ==
Sature is a board game of color. The game always pits one player playing against another (or against a computer). Your objective is to darken and dull out your opponent's colors and end the game with the brighter overall colors. Each player begins the game with a number of hexagonal pieces each with a different color and random number of outward-pointing arrows. Each turn, a colored piece is placed on the board. If a piece is placed on a space with one of the piece's arrows pointing at a previously placed piece, then the piece being pointed at will change color (and already placed pieces with arrows facing in the correct position will "retaliate" against the piece just played). When "attacked," a piece will darken. The greater the color difference between the interacting pieces, the more attacked pieces will darken. A slider at the bottom of the screen indicates which player has the overall brightest colors and is thus winning. There is also a color wheel players can consult at any point during gameplay when strategizing.

=== Special Pieces ===
- Grayscale – The grayscale piece does not have a hue, but will always mix as if it had a hue on the opposite side of the wheel. It still weakens as it gets darker.
- Bomb – The bomb piece counts down every turn until it explodes, blackening any piece its arrows face. The bomb piece is unaffected by other pieces.
- Healing – The healing piece will brighten the pieces that its arrows point at. The healing piece is unaffected by other pieces.
- Split – The split piece is divided into two halves with different colors. While the piece has two separate hues, they share the same brightness.
- Wall – The wall piece will function exactly as any of the other walls that were generated at the start of the match.

== Reception ==
Soon after release, Sature was listed as one of The Best New iOS Games on Mac|Life and was on CNET's list of Best Mobile Games of March 2015. Within a couple weeks of release, Sature was a feature in Apple's App Store's Best New Games list in the United States. It has generated a series of reviews and has been described as a chess-like game. Others have likened it to Final Fantasy VIII's Triple Triad. A soundtrack of the game's music entitled Sature Original Soundtrack is also available for download.
