= Okupas =

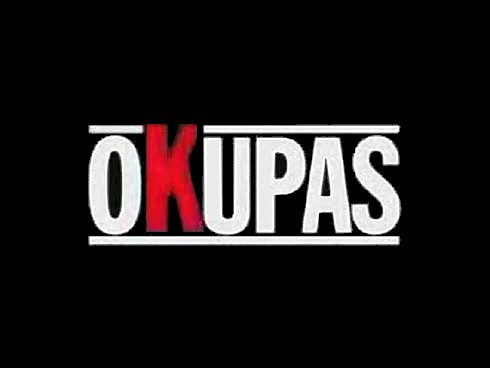
- Directed by: Bruno Stagnaro
- Starring: Rodrigo de la Serna; Diego Alonso Gómez; Ariel Staltari; Franco Tirri
- Country of origin: Argentina
- Original language: Spanish
- No. of seasons: 1
- No. of episodes: 11

Production
- Running time: 32–44 minutes

Original release
- Release: 18 October – 27 December 2000

Okupas is an Argentine television series, starring Rodrigo de la Serna, Diego Alonso Gómez, Ariel Staltari and Franco Tirri. It won four Martín Fierro Awards.

It was written and directed by Bruno Stagnaro. It was first aired in 2000 on Canal 7 and was a great success in the Argentine television. Since then it was aired by many television channels and since July 2021 it is available on Netflix.

The series follows a group of four friends who live in a squatted house discovering new experiences dealing with the police and gangs. It is considered an Argentine cult classic.

== Plot ==
Ricardo (de la Serna), a 24-year old dropout med student receives an invitation from his cousin, Clara (Ana Celentano), to stay at an old house in the Buenos Aires neighbourhood of San Nicolás. The house had been until then squatted by a group of families who were recently evicted. Never minding the situation, Ricardo settles in the dilapidated house. He decides to invite his working-class friend, Sergio "El Pollo" (Alonso Gómez), who makes ends meet as a debt collector.

New characters are introduced over the course of the episodes: Walter (Staltari), a lazy dog walker, and "Chiqui" (Tirri), an easy-going pothead who's living in the streets until he's welcomed into the house by Ricardo. The four become involved in a number of situations with drugs, crime and gangs, all while developing an increasingly close friendship.

== Cast ==
- Rodrigo de la Serna as Ricardo Riganti, a 24-year old med student dropout who is asked to stay a dilapidated house in Downtown Buenos Aires.
- Diego Alonso Gómez as Sergio "El Pollo", an old childhood friend of Ricardo's. His humble working-class origins stand in contrast to Ricardo's privileged origins.
- Ariel Staltari as Walter, a lazy dog walker and rolinga. He adopts a dog whom he calls Severino, after the anarchist Severino Di Giovanni.
- Franco Tirri as "El Chiqui", a well-meaning, immature friend of Sergio's. At the beginning of the series, he's living in the streets and asks Ricardo for money in several occasions. He grows his own marihuana at the next-door squatted house.
- Ana Celentano as Clara Alvarado, Ricardo's cousin and the legal owner of the house. She has a boyfriend, but later she begins an affair with Sergio.
- Augusto Brítez as Peralta, Ricardo's neighbour from Salta who is squatting the abandoned house next-door.
- Rosina Soto as Sofía, Peralta's daughter. She has a son and is finishing high school as an adult. She initially develops a relationship with Ricardo, but later breaks up with him due to their contrasting social backgrounds and Ricardo's belief that studying is unnecessary.
- Dante Mastropierro as "El Negro Pablo", a shady character, squatter and drug dealer, and former associate of Sergio's. At the beginning of the series he lives in a squatted flat in Dock Sud with Sergio, but they have a fall-out due to El Negro's lack of moral codes. He later tries to get back at Sergio by antagonising Ricardo, triggering most of the events of the series.
- Jorge Sesán as Miguel, a violent and foul-mouthed character introduced in the middle of the series. He claims to be the house's real owner and wins Ricardo's favour teaching him to use firearms and how to rob people.

== Reception ==
The series' pilot episode had a rating peak of 3.5, an above-average score for the state-owned Canal 7. The final episode doubled that score with a rating peak of 6.7. The following year, due to the series' evident success, Canal 7 repeated the series and commissioned an additional episode showing behind-the-scenes material. In 2002, following the release of Tumberos, Okupas was syndicated by América TV and broadcast for the third year in a row. It was also syndicated by Canal 9 in 2005.

On 20 October 2020, nearly twenty years after its original run, it was announced the series would be re-released on Netflix with a new soundtrack designed by Santiago Motorizado of Él Mató a un Policía Motorizado. The new soundtrack was commissioned due to copyright issues with the original soundtrack.
