= Ricardo Becher =

Argentine film director

- Born: 1930; Buenos Aires, Argentina
- Died: 2011 (aged 80–81); Buenos Aires, Argentina
- Occupations: Film director, screenwriter
- Years active: 1955–2011

Ricardo Becher (1930–2011) was an Argentine film director, screenwriter and journalist. He directed twelve films 1955 and 2006. His 1969 film Coup de Grâce was entered into the 19th Berlin International Film Festival.

He worked as Leopoldo Torre Nilsson's assistant director on four films. During the 1970s he made a living in advertising and publicity. Since 1990 he made a career as a filmmaking teacher and he has published two novels.

In 2006 he screened his last feature film in the VI BAFICI (Buenos Aires Festival Internacional de Cine Independiente) where a retrospective of his films was made. He is the founder of the N.E.D Neo expresionismo digital, a way of transforming the video footage (imagen mundo) by postproduction filters in the search of its essence.

== Selected filmography ==
- The Female: Seventy Times Seven (1962 – writer)
- The Terrace (1963 – writer)
- Coup de Grâce (1969)
- Back Long Ago (1969)
