= Coup de Grâce (1969 film) =

1969 film

- Directed by: Ricardo Becher
- Written by: Ricardo Becher; Sergio Mulet
- Produced by: Ricardo Becher; Guillermo Smith
- Starring: Sergio Mulet
- Cinematography: Carlos Brera
- Edited by: Óscar Souto
- Music by: Manal
- Release date: 2 October 1969
- Running time: 101 minutes
- Country: Argentina
- Language: Spanish

Coup de Grâce (Spanish: Tiro de gracia) is a 1969 Argentine film directed by Ricardo Becher. It was entered into the 19th Berlin International Film Festival.

== Cast ==
- Sergio Mulet - Daniel
- Franca Tosato - Josefina
- Roberto Plate - Raul
- Mario Skubin - Mario
- Alejandro Holst - Quique
- María Vargas - La Negra
- Bocha Mantiniani - Carlos
- Alfredo Plank - Plank
- Juan Carlos Gené - Ramon
- Cristina Plate - Greta
- Edgardo Suárez - Paco
