= Rodrigo de la Serna =

Argentine actor (born 1976)

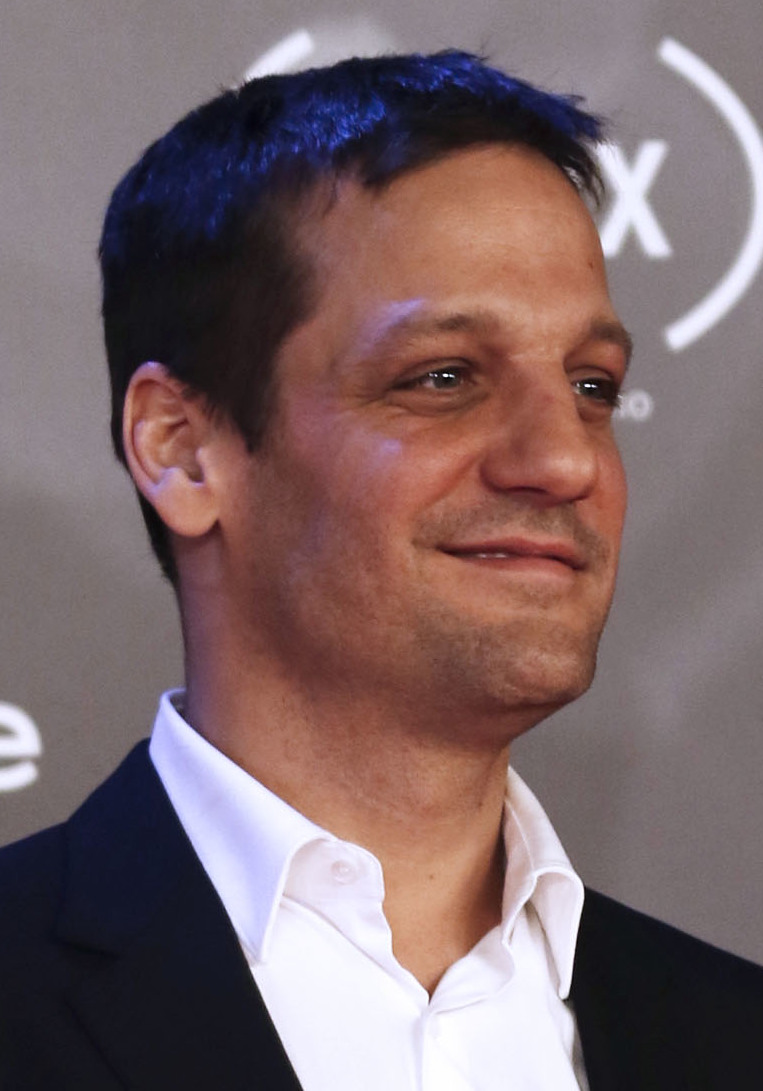
- De la Serna in 2017
- Born: Lionel Rodrigo de la serna 18 April 1976 (age 50); Buenos Aires, Argentina
- Occupation: Actor
- Years active: 1995–present
- Partners: Érica Rivas (1999–2010); Ludmila Romero (2016–2021)
- Children: 3

Lionel Rodrigo de la Serna (Spanish: [roˈðɾiɣo ðe la ˈseɾna]; born 18 April 1976) is an Argentine actor. He is known for playing Alberto Granado in the 2004 biopic The Motorcycle Diaries and Palermo in the Netflix series Money Heist.

== Career ==
De la Serna started his career in several smaller productions like Same Love, Same Rain and Nuts for Love. In 2000, he portrayed Ricardo Riganti in the Canal 7 series Okupas, now considered an Argentine cult classic.

In 2004 starred in the biopic The Motorcycle Diaries for which he won a Silver Condor award for best actor, an Independent Spirit Award for "Best Debut Performance" and earned him a nomination for a BAFTA Award for Best Supporting Actor. He played the role of Alberto Granado, the travelling companion of Che Guevara during their 8-month long journey through South America.

Over the years he has starred in several Argentine television series such as El Puntero, Tiempos Compulsivos, Sol Negro and Contra las cuerdas, for which he was nominated and received several Martín Fierro Awards, an Argentine radio and television award.

In recent years he played a leading role in the historical film Revolución: El Cruce de los Andes focusing on José de San Martin and the Crossing of the Andes, Chiamatemi Francesco (Call Me Francis), an Italian biographical film about Pope Francis, and the 2018 Netflix comedy film Yucatán. He also starred in Camino a la paz (Path to Peace) and To Steal from a Thief, which were both released internationally and de la Serna receiving a nomination for Best New Actor at the 31st Goya Awards for To Steal from a Thief.

In 2019 he gained prominence by joining the cast of the successful Spanish television show Money Heist for its third part as the character Palermo. He resumed his role in part 4 which was released on Netflix in April 2020.

De la Serna also starred in a few theatre productions in Argentina including Lluvia Constante for which he won a Premio Florencio and most recently El Farmer in the Teatro La Comedia in Buenos Aires in 2019.

He is part of the music group El Yotivenco, which formed in 2005.

== Personal life ==
De la Serna dated actress Érica Rivas from 1999 to 2010, with whom he had one child. From 2016 to 2021, he dated journalist Ludmila Romero, with whom he had two children.

== Filmography ==
Year	Title	Role
1995–1996	Cybersix	
1997–1998	Son o se hacen	
1999	Campeones de la vida	
1999	Same Love, Same Rain	
2000	Nuts for Love	
2000	Okupas	Ricardo
2001	Gallito Ciego	
2002	Sol negro	
2004	The Motorcycle Diaries	Alberto Granada
2005	Botines	Enzo
2006	Hermanos y detectives	
2009	El Torcán	Fontano
2010	Lo que el tiempo nos dejó	
2010	San Martín: El Cruce de los Andes	
2010–2011	Contra las cuerdas	
2011	Mía	
2011	El puntero	
2012–2013	Tiempos compulsivos	
2015	Camino a la paz	
2015	Chiamatemi Francesco	
2016	To Steal from a Thief	El Uruguayo
2016	Inseparables	Tito
2018	El lobista	Matías Franco
2018	Yucatán	Clayderman
2019–2021	Money Heist	Martín "Palermo" Berrote
2023	The Rescue: The Weight of the World	Julio Levy
2025	My Friend Eva	Alex
