= Botines =

- Genre: Crime
- Created by: Adrián Suar
- Country of origin: Argentina
- Original language: Spanish
- No. of seasons: 1

Production
- Producer: Pol-ka

Original release
- Network: El Trece
- Release: April 12 – July 12, 2005

Botines (Spanish: Bounties) is a 2005 Argentine miniseries, produced by Pol-Ka. Each episode had a specific cast, and the plot was based on a real crime, either from Argentina or another country. Diego Peretti won the Martín Fierro Award and the Clarín Award as best actor, Inés Esteves the Martín Fierro as best actress, and Rodrigo de la Serna the Clarín as best actor.

The series premiered on 12 April 2005.
