= Foam pump =

Liquid dispenser

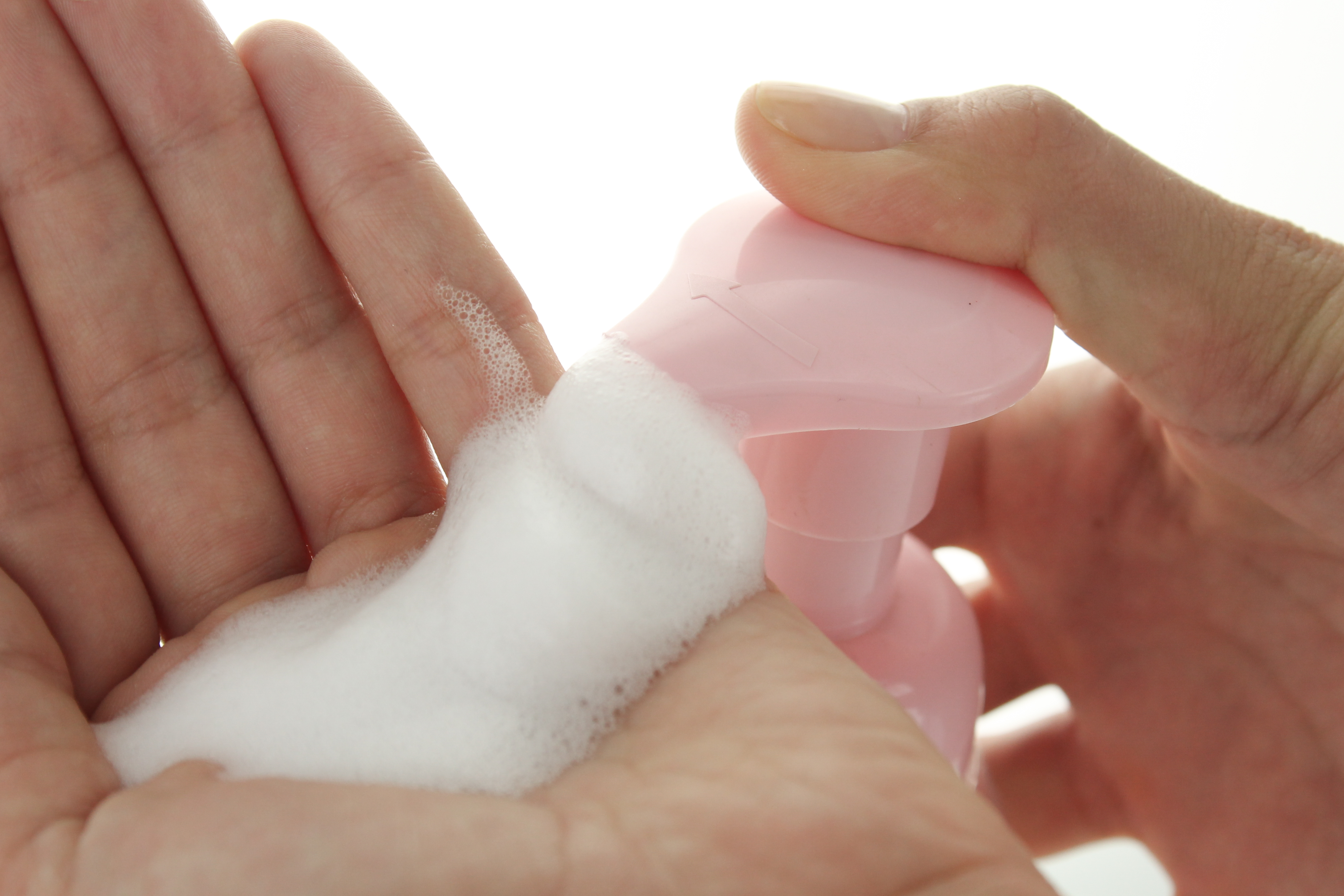
A foam pump

A foam pump, or squeeze foamer and dispensing device is a non-aerosol way of dispensing liquid materials. When its plunger is pressed, the foam pump mixes the liquid with air and outputs foam. The parts of the foam pump, mostly made from polypropylene (PP), are similar to those of other pump devices. The foaming pump often comes with a protective cap.

== Operation ==
A foam pump dispenses doses of the liquid contained in the bottle in the form of foam. Two separate pumps push liquid and air into and through the foaming chamber and a nylon mesh, and the resulting foam is discharged from a small nozzle. The neck finish size of a foam pump is bigger than the neck finish size of other types of pumps, to accommodate the foaming chamber. The usual neck size of a foam pump is 40 or 43mm.

Where hair-coloring products previously contained instructions to vigorously shake the product, squeeze the bottle, and turn upside-down to disperse the product, foamers do not require any such actions. Some foaming dispensers include suction on the bottom to allow the container to remain upright.

Foamers can be purchased alone, or filled with a liquid product like soap. When the liquid is mixed with air, the liquid product can be dispersed through the pump-top as a foam. Foamers can also be re-used with different liquid products to extend the mass of the liquid by creating a foam-version.

== Applications ==
The foam pump is widely used for dispensing cosmetic products and household chemicals, such as mousse foam cleansing, hand washing liquid, hand sanitizer, facial cleanser, shaving cream, hair conditioning mousse, sun protection foam, spot removers, baby products, and so on. In the field of food and beverages, molecular gastronomy style foam is usually created using various techniques and stabilizers such as lecithin, but there is at least one ready-to-use liqueur that has been developed with the foaming apparatus top that produces an alcoholic foam topping for drinks.

== See also ==
- Soap dispenser
