= Back Long Ago =

- Directed by: Ricardo Becher
- Written by: Guillermo Enrique Hudson
- Starring: Anna Bradley; Rodolfo López; Cihangir Ghaffari
- Release date: 1969
- Country: Argentina
- Language: Spanish

Back Long Ago (Spanish: Allá lejos y hace tiempo) is a 1969 Argentine film directed by Ricardo Becher and written by Guillermo Enrique Hudson, with George Sherry Zabrieskie

The film starred Anna Bradley, Rodolfo López and Cihangir Ghaffari as John Foster.

== Cast ==
- Cihangir Gaffari
- Anna Bradley
- Rodolfo López
- Kuky Heberbur
- Alfredo Plank
- Barry Van Kleek

== Bibliography ==
- Raúl Manrupe, Maria Alejandra. Un diccionario de films argentinos (1930-1995). Editorial Corregidor, 2001
