= Vidas robadas =

Vidas robadas may refer to:

- Vidas robadas (Argentine TV series), a 2008 Argentine telenovela
- Vidas robadas (Mexican TV series), a 2010 Mexican telenovela
