= Alika Kinan =

Argentine feminist and anti-trafficking activist (born 1976)

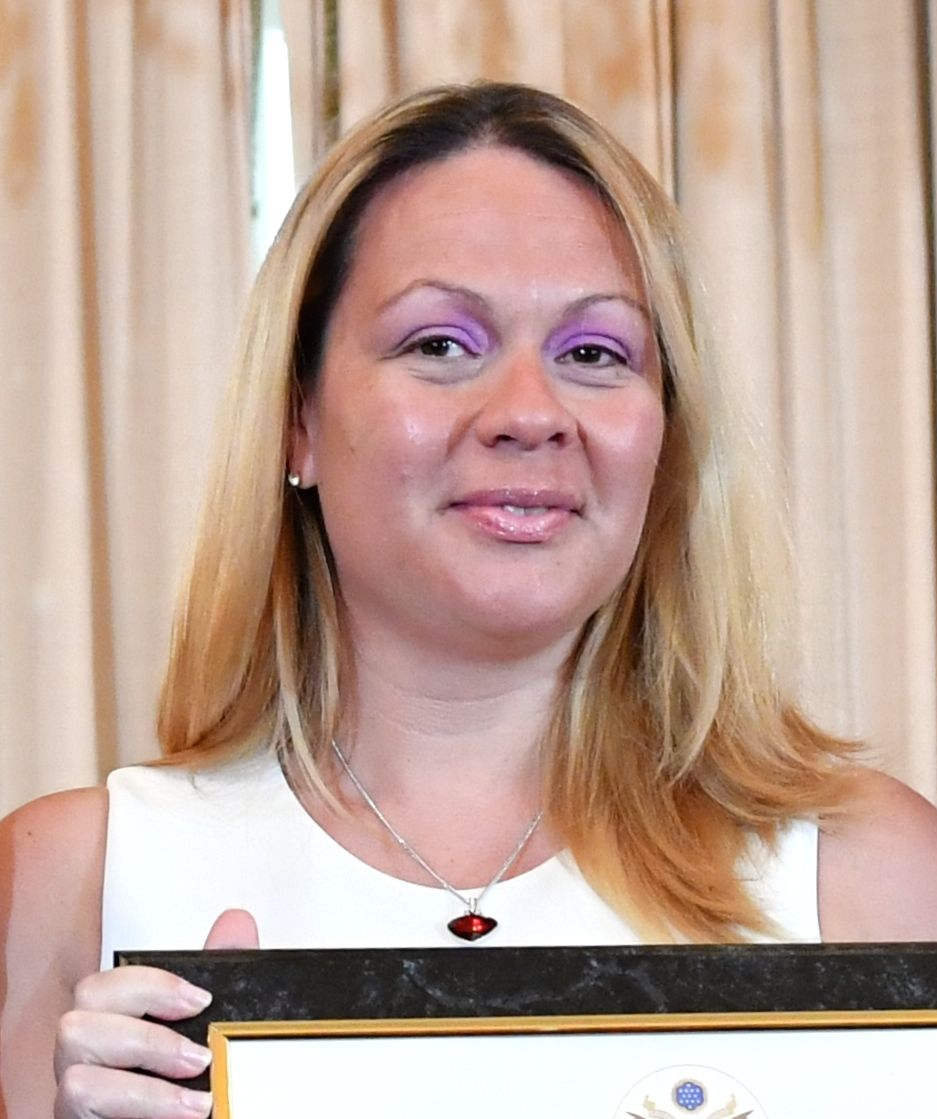
- Kinan in 2017
- Born: Alika Kinan Sánchez; 24 June 1976 (age 49); Córdoba, Argentina
- Occupation: Activist

Alika Kinan Sánchez (born 24 June 1976) is an Argentine feminist and anti-human trafficking activist. After a police raid at the brothel where she was being sexually exploited in 2012, she began advocating for the abolition of prostitution. She attracted media attention in Argentina when she sued her exploiters and the city where the brothel was located. She became known worldwide when the United States Department of State gave her an award for her anti-trafficking activism.

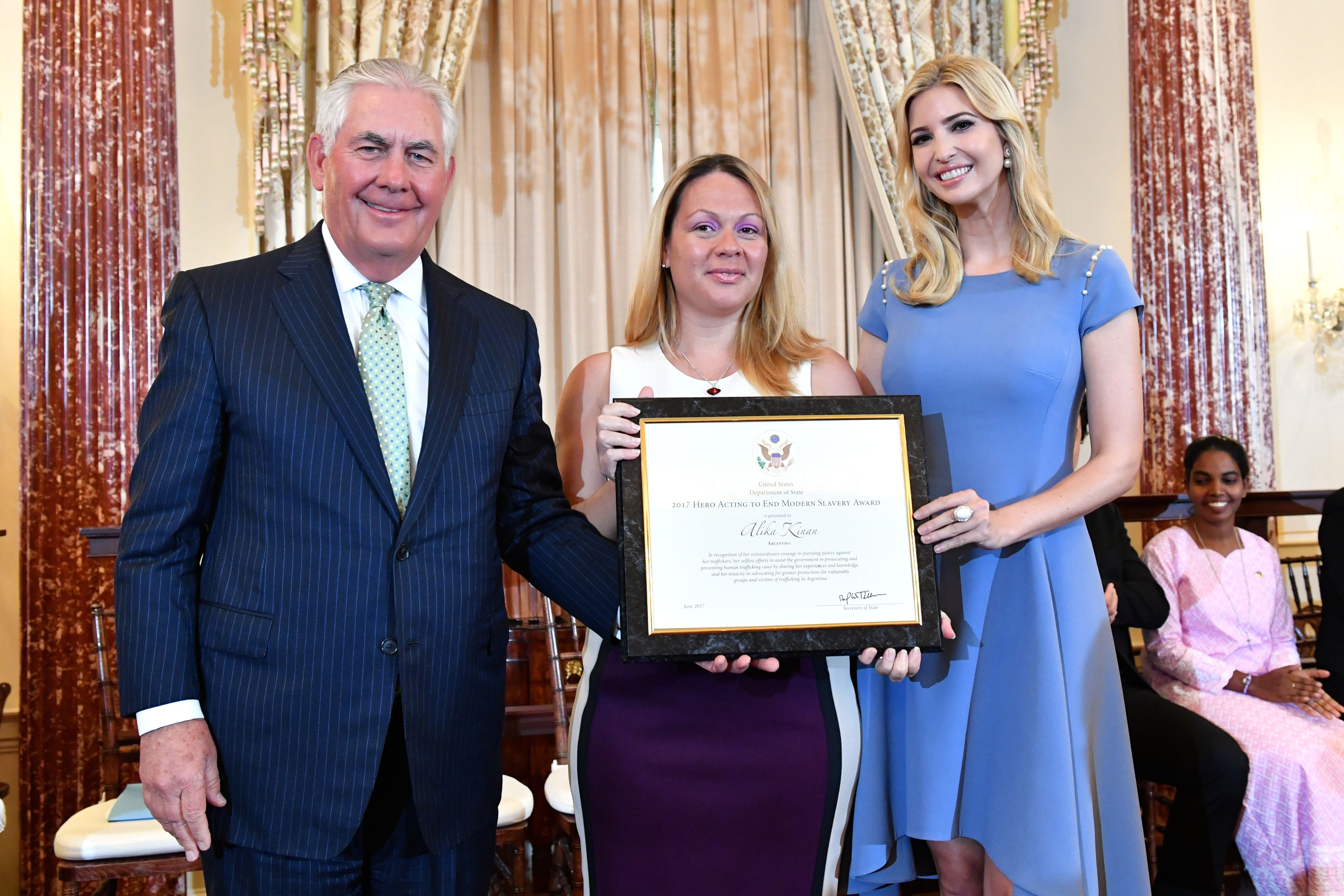
Kinan holding an award together with Rex Tillerson and Ivanka Trump on 27 June 2017.

== Childhood and family ==
Kinan's family had enough money to provide her a good education, but her life began to spiral downhill when her father began to abuse her mother. Kinan has said that her mother, along with her grandmother and her aunts, were prostituted. She has described how her father used to tell stories after dinner about how he met her mother and how he rescued her from the zulo. (Zulo is a word with many meanings. In this context, it could mean either a small, wretched apartment, or a brothel.) Kinan was raped at age fourteen. Her parents separated when she was fifteen and her younger sister was nine, and her father stopped supporting the family.

== Abandoned by parents, enters sex work ==
A year later Kinan's mother went to Buenos Aires, leaving her to care for her sister. (According to some sources, Kinan's mother took Kinan and her sister to Buenos Aires and Kinan later returned to Córdoba.) Kinan tried cooking and selling a local pastry but couldn't earn enough to support herself and her sister. Her father refused to help her. Reportedly, he told her "You know what you have to do," implying that she should become a prostitute. She worked for someone for three months but received no pay. A friend suggested working at Aries, a brothel run out of a private apartment.

Kinan remembers her decision to enter sex work:

My grandmother was a prostitute, my mom and my aunts too, it's like being in that situation seems natural. When my mom leaves I'm left in charge of my sister, who is a lot younger than me. There came a time when we did not have anything to eat, we had nowhere to live, it was an extreme situation, I was left with a small child and I was facing that situation. It was then that a girl makes me an offer in a place X, and tells me that we could go to a private apartment where they were hosting bachelor parties, it was like a massage place, it all seemed very strange. At that time I did not go, until the situation was so extreme that I was up to my neck and one day I found myself ringing the bell at the place that had been pointed out to me.

Kinan was seventeen at the time. She remembers her first client as being grotesquely fat and smelling like talcum powder. She still remembers the odor:

on the subject of the massages, there are those strange scents that stay with you for life. It's very disgusting. It's those memories that you try to bury under everything else.

After that, she worked at bachelor parties and continued seeing individual clients. She received 40% of the clients' fees, which was enough to rent a place for her and her sister. While still underage, she attracted the attention of the police and spent more time hiding from them than servicing clients, which would have reduced the amount of money she could earn to support herself and her sister. She says

... when I was younger, I tried to avoid the police because there was a follow-up, a payment of fines, but I was still underage and if the police caught me it would be worse.

At one point during this period, Kinan seems to have also been supporting her father. She says that he lived with her and asked her for money. He also threatened to get a lawyer and take her younger sister away from her.

== Ushuaia ==
Up to this time, Kinan had been moving back and forth between Cruz del Eje and the city of Córdoba. Another woman recommended that she move to Ushuaia, in Argentina's Tierra del Fuego region. Kinan was told that she would get many clients who paid well in dollars, and she could keep 50% of the clients fees, as opposed to the 40% that she kept in Córdoba.

She said to me "I was in the south, you earn very good money, there are fishing boats, many foreigners, you can charge in dollars, you earn double because you are paid best." ... they gave you 40%, and so I went to Ushuaia where they did not deduct so much.

Different sources report her age at this time as fifteen, eighteen, nineteen or twenty. She was born on June 24, 1976 and went to Ushuaia in 1996. Reportedly she arrived in Ushuaia in April, which would make her 19 but only two months from her twentieth birthday. A plane ticket was sent to her and in Ushuaia she began work at a nightclub called Sheik where, as promised, she kept 50% of the clients' fees. After a while she rented a place and sent for her sister, paying for her school, English classes, computers, clothing, and food.

(Various sources give the name of the nightclub as "El Sheikh", "El Sheik", "Sheikh", and "Sheik". Photographs of the nightclub show a sign saying "Sheik", so that is the name used in this article.)

== Marriage ==
According to Kinan's ex-husband, Miguel Pascual, they met in 1996, the same year she arrived in Ushuaia. She had already changed employers and was working at the nightclub Black & White. He paid her managers extra to spend extra time with her, but she wasn't informed and as she comments, "... obviously I did not see any of it." Pascual served three yearlong tours of duty on a ship that supplied Spain's Antarctic bases. He and Kinan saw each other during those three years when his boat docked in Ushuaia. He told her he wanted her to be his life partner. Kinan was apparently in danger at the time:

People from Rio Grande had come looking for me with guns, I went with a boy a little bigger than I, who suggested that I go on vacation with him, he was very insistent and the truth that I had to run from here because at any moment some pimp with guns was going to create a bad situation ...

In a different interview, she didn't mention the pimps with guns, but she indicated a similar degree of desperation:

The point is that this guy left a lot of money every time he came, always paid in dollars - it's the time of 1 to 1 [The Argentine peso was pegged to the U.S. dollar at one to one.] and I said that in order to leave that place I was going wherever he went. I was not in love. I submitted.

So he took her on vacation in Barcelona where his family had businesses and drove Mercedes, and she ended up staying with him in Spain and bringing her sister over.

In Kinan's description of the marriage, she worked at businesses owned by her husband's family. One source says that he collected half her wages, another says that he collected all of her wages. She wasn't allowed to use the car and was required to function as the maid. To support her sister, she secretly sold her eggs. (It must have been extremely difficult to hide this from her husband without a car.) She says her husband quickly became violent.

... I was faced with a violent guy, a family where violence was naturalized. I remember that the first time he hit me was the few months I went with him, and the first thing I did was tell the mother, because he had smashed the remote control in my face, and she asked me "but what did you do?" Then I realized I was to the oven. [An Argentine idiom indicating being in a bad situation from which there is no escape.]

A few days before the start of the trial, Pascual gave a very different description of their marriage, which he described as "hell from the first day." He claims that it was she who assaulted him, and that he defended himself without hitting her.

She tried to hit me two times, I am a master of martial arts, and both times I took her by the hair and back, and I put her on her knees ... Both times I immobilized her when she tried to hit me, but she never hit me.

Kinan says that at some point after the birth of their second child, her husband sent her to a brothel. Her husband denies the accusations of forced labor and forced prostitution.

At no time was she forced. She worked in Spain with my brother in a transport company. She has lied about me, about my mother saying that she forced her to work. [The eldest daughter] was in Buenos Aires saying that her mother had been mistreated and forced into prostitution in Spain, and that never happened. I can give names of the companies in which she worked and I have a thousand witnesses.

Over nine years they had three children. According to Kinan, one night when the oldest was eight, she refused to do her homework and her father hit her hard enough to cause bleeding. Kinan decided that she needed to leave Spain and persuaded her husband to take them all back to Argentina. According to her husband, Miguel Pascual, they moved to Córdoba in Argentina in 2008, and separated in 2010. At that point he returned to Spain and Kinan returned to Ushuaia and Sheik to support herself and her children.

As with Kinan, there are some discrepancies in different versions of Pascual's story. At one point he said that he and Kinan separated, and he continued sending money for their daughters until he discovered that she had returned to sex work. In another account he claimed to be present when she made the phone call to Sheik to ask about returning to sex work. In this telling, they separated because she was returning to sex work, and he later stopped sending money because she married another man whom she was supporting.

== Brothel work ==
Following the police raid at the Black & White nightclub/brothel, news outlets published information about the brothel's operations. Much of this information relates to aspects of brothel operation that aren't described in news reports describing Sheik. Kinan worked at Black & White immediately before leaving for Spain. This section uses information about both Sheik and Black & White to give a more complete picture of the working conditions that Kinan would have encountered.

Alika Kinan's experience at the two brothels were probably common for sex workers across the southern Cone area. Descriptions of brothels in two Chilean cities not far from Ushuaia and in Ushuaia itself closely match the business operations of Sheik and Black & White. Information and employees seem to have moved more or less freely between the six brothels of Ushuaia, which were located within a few blocks of each other. When many of Ushuaia's sex workers migrated to Punta Arenas in Chile after the police raids shut down the brothels in Ushuaia, it was a one-time group migration, but it probably followed a path previously forged by individual sex workers moving between the two cities. No two businesses operate in exactly the same way, but these two brothels can be taken as a rough proxy for legally regulated brothels in Patagonia.

=== Management ===
==== Sheik ====
The primary manager at Sheik was Pedro Montoya, who was involved with the brothel throughout its existence. During an earlier period, his co-manager was his wife Claudia Quiroga, who owned the property where the brothel was located. The on-site supervisor under Quiroga was Corina Sánchez.

At the time of the police raid, Quiroga and Sánchez were no longer involved. The co-manager was Montoya's girlfriend Ivana Claudia García, and the on-site supervisor was Lucy Alberca Campos. García's brother Jorge Etcheverry worked as a recruiter for the brothel.

During the trial, Kinan described how the managers used surveillance cameras to monitor the women:

They ordered us where to position ourselves, how we should sit, because Claudia operated the cameras wherever you were. When the phone rang you knew it was Claudia who was watching who was coming in, who had to get on the phone, if you were standing, if you had gone to the bathroom a lot, because they monitored even the times you went to the bathroom. Everything was monitored.

One woman was described by the managers as "like the fish, you use everything but the head." (Equivalent to the American expression "butterface" or the Australian expression "prawn.") This was cited at the trial as an example of the managers' contempt toward the women. At the trial, one of the police witnesses said that the managers mislead the women in order to recruit them, and then belittled them for their poverty and poor education. Kinan remembers the following scene:

Even the female owner, the girlfriend of the trafficker always told me that she was going to teach me how to work, then she would knock me against the bar and say "give it to me, baby, bring me money, give it to me" and hit the bar hard. I remember that I jumped a few leaps ...

On the other hand, Kinan felt that the managers were

The family I had never had, the one that never cared for me, I said that they took care of me, gave me housing. That's why I made the decision to return. I thought that corresponded because I had to be working and these people gave me housing, they cared for me, because if something happened, I cut a finger or had to go to the doctor they accompanied me ... they took care that I did not spread disease, that I did not catch any infection, I did not catch the flu. When the snowy season began, they would tell me to go get the vaccine or take something so I would not get sick.

As Kinan points out, it was good business to keep workers healthy and productive. The feeling that the managers were her family is not surprising, given that between the age of sixteen, when she was left to support herself and her sister, and the age of thirty-six, when the police raided Sheik, the brothels of Ushuaia and her husband were the only ones who concerned themselves about her health, housing, and financial support.

==== Black & White ====
The primary manager at Black & White was Victor Morales, nicknamed "Jefe". His daughter seems to have been second in command. Other people involved in some sort of managerial capacity included his ex-wife, his current girlfriend, and his son.

Like Sheik, Black and White had security cameras. One woman was so unnerved by their presence that she left shortly after arrival.

=== Workers ===
==== Sheik ====
There were seven women working at Sheik at the time of the police raid, three from the Dominican Republic, one from Paraguay, and three from Argentina. All of them were supporting children with no assistance from the fathers. Most of them hadn't finished formal basic education and had no good alternatives to sex work. One of the women had only the clothes she was wearing when she moved to Ushuaia to work at Sheik.

==== Black & White ====
Black & White's web site promised twenty-five women. During the police investigation the number of women employed varied from twelve to twenty. At the time of the raid it employed eighteen women. The majority of them were from the Dominican Republic, but some came from other provinces in Argentina, or from Colombia. Most of them were in their twenties. A woman who was thirty eight said that Morales was initially reluctant to hire her because of her age.

Among the women who were described, one had left home and was struggling to support herself, one had debts, and two had been doing sex work in Rosario, Santa Fe and came to Ushuaia for the job. One of the women was mentally ill and her condition prompted the police to end the investigation and raid the brothel.

One of the women interviewed by the prosecutors during the Black & White investigation testified that she had been seventeen years old when Morales recruited her. She said that he brought her to Ushuaia along with two other underage girls. When they arrived at the house they would live in, they found other employees of the brothel who were also underage. However, at the time of the police raid, all of the women employed by the brothel were legally adults.

=== Government involvement in the brothels ===
When a sex worker first arrived at Ushuaia, she would first be taken to the police station where the provincial police would take her fingerprints, open a file on her, and ensure that she had no criminal record. The city government then set up a health book that recorded her medical examinations. The city of Ushuaia required the women to undergo regular examinations, involving tests for HIV and sexually transmitted infections and analysis of vaginal discharges. There were no examinations at Sheik during the period of police surveillance. The women were probably relieved; a witness at the trial testified that the inspectors mocked and humiliated the women they were examining. The owner of Sheik testified during the trial that there were two to three inspections per month, and listed inspections to confirm that the business permits were in order, that there was a fire extinguisher, and that the entertainers had their sanitary pads.

The city continued the police registration and medical inspections of women in the local brothels after the time Argentina's anti-trafficking law was passed in 2008 (see the article Human trafficking in Argentina) until the first brothel raids in 2012. In addition, one source says that the city charged for inspections and the renewal of a woman's health book, which occurred quarterly.

This matches a historical pattern in Argentina's Patagonia region. Municipal governments, strongly influenced by local businessmen, wanted to use their powers of regulation to maintain their tax bases and were opposed to too much interference in the brothel business. The provincial police had other funding sources and wanted to restrict brothel activities in unprofitable ways. The municipal government of Rio Gallegos was founded in 1912, and by 1914 there was already conflict between the city and the police of Santa Cruz province over the regulation of brothels.

In the case of Ushuaia, the conflict was between the municipal government and the federal justice system. About the same time as the police raid on Sheik, the city council of Ushuaia was advised that it should pass a law closing the remaining nightclubs. A sampling of council members' responses:

But there are tourists looking for that ...

What do we do with the men who come on the ships?

Let's put a red zone.

If we close the cabarets, they will rape our daughters in the streets.

=== Recruitment ===
==== Sheik ====
None of the women working at Sheik were from Ushuaia. Some came from elsewhere in Argentina and some came from other countries. The women picked up in police raids in Ushuaia included women from the Dominican Republic and Colombia. When a woman agreed to work at Sheik, the nightclub would send her an airline ticket, which she paid back from her share of the money she charged the clients.

Pedro Montoya, the owner, testified that all the women came from other brothels, either in Ushuaia or elsewhere. Kinan herself worked at two brothels in Ushuaia. Montoya said that he got calls from women asking to work at Sheik. Montoya and his girlfriend and business partner Ivana Claudia García were responsible for recruitment, but García seems to have done most of the recruiting with help from her brother, whose sole function at the nightclub was recruiter.

==== Black & White ====
Women were recruited from various provinces, including Santiago del Estero, Córdoba, Santa Fe, and Buenos Aires, as well as from outside the country. Between 2009 and 2012, Victor Morales published more than 100 ads in Buenos Aires newspapers. Two of the ads running in the newspaper Clarin offered waitresses 20,000 pesos per month, and dancers 10,000 pesos per month. Both offered travel expenses to Ushuaia, lodging, and relocation expenses. The women who were recruited with these ads discovered that once they had arrived at Ushuaia, they were expected to repay the travel costs. Morales was more honest with a sex worker he recruited through an ad and told her during their initial contact that she would repay him with the money from her sessions with clients. One of the sources who saw transcripts of the police wire taps put it this way:

According to the degree of naivety of the person who needed the job, [Morales] revealed more or less data.

While this approach may have helped persuade more women to travel to Ushuaia, it also meant that some left as soon as they arrived.

Police telephone taps recorded the following conversation:

Nancy: Clearly, and the work is? Victor: Well the work you mix with the public, you are not forced to prostitute yourself if you don't want, that is what you choose, when and how, yes? And the price, at least I put a price that from there up, you can charge more or equal, but not less, that are three hundred pesos fifteen minutes, four hundred the half hour, and five hundred an hour, and then the part, Let's say that it closes to me, that it serves me, the others let's say is a consequence, if you want to do it, you do and if you do not want to do it you do not do it, those are the services yes, but the drinks cost one hundred ...

Morales wasn't telling her that both the city and provincial governments would label her a prostitute, the provincial police would fingerprint her, check her criminal record, and open a file on her, or that the city would periodically inspect her genitals, test her for STIs, and maintain a record of the results.

A women who had worked as a professional dancer answered one of Morales' ads for dancers. While Morales explains about selling drinks to "Nancy" in the transcript above, the dancer didn't learn about it until her first night in the nightclub. That was also when she learned that she was expected to make herself available for sexual sessions with the clients. When she objected to working in a brothel, one of the female managers slapped her and fined her four hundred pesos for talking back. She said that one night she hid in a bathroom and the managers beat her and forced her back to the bar.

In contrast, eleven of the eighteen women at the brothel when the police raided it told investigators that they were there by their own choice. They didn't feel that they had been tricked or that they were being exploited.

Over a period of two years, the city of Ushuaia issued seventy health books to Black & White. Since each health book represents a new employee, the nightclub was recruiting about three new employees every month. Assuming that the nightclub employed an average of eighteen women over that two year time period, the average period of employment would be about six months. Once the nightclub hired a woman, it would need to recruit her replacement six months later.

In addition to ads, women were recruited through informal networks. One woman contacted Morales through a friend. Another was recruited through contacts at Madaho's, a well known bar (strip joint ) in the Recoleta neighborhood of Buenos Aires.

=== Living conditions ===
==== Sheik ====
During the trial, lawyers for the complainant described the women living in rooms off the main hall of the nightclub, which they described as small, dirty, bad smelling, and visited by rats. Kinan described their quarters as a zulo (a cramped, impoverished living space) lacking hot water, with 2 people sharing a room. There was a bell in the area of the rooms activated at the bar which was rung to signal to the woman that a client had entered the nightclub. Each room had its own entrance separate from the nightclub's main entrance and each of the women had their own key.

Prior to the raid on Black & White, the women serviced their clients in their rooms. Testimony at the trial described them using bleach to remove blood and semen stains from their mattresses. In addition to sharing a room with a coworker, each woman was also bringing clients into her room an average of two to three times a night. (See Money section.) With two women in a room, that would be a minimum of four client visits per room per night. There wouldn't have been much privacy.

A post on a monger board made in 2006 says that Sheik had four bedrooms, which matches with other testimony. However, the post says that Sheik had eighteen women working there at the time. If they were all living at the brothel, that would be four women in each of two rooms and five women in each of the other two, with a corresponding number of client visits to each room every night. Even if some of the women were living and servicing their clients off-site, it would have been pretty crowded.

==== Black & White ====
Unlike Sheik, the women at Black & White lived off-site. They shared a house with coworkers and paid 300 pesos rent per month. Rent for one room in Ushuaia can go as high as 15,000 pesos per month, so the rent charged by Black & White was not unreasonable for shared living space. The nightclub had two rooms where the women and their clients had their sessions, so the women weren't bringing clients into their living space.

While the women at Sheik had keys to their living quarters, one witness reported being barred from leaving the house where Black & White's employees lived. She said that there were three men who lived in the house who transported them between the house and the nightclub. When she wanted to walk out of the house onto the street in order to have a phone conversation with relatives without house mates around, the men prevented her from leaving.

In contrast, Kinan was working at Black & White during all but a few months of the first three years she lived in Ushuaia. During this period she rented a place for her sister to live in, which suggests that she was free to travel around the city and conduct business. The dancer who objected to being tricked into working at a brothel sometimes left the house on her own and was allowed to use a computer with Internet access.

One of the women was mentally ill, and the prosecutors said that she was imprisoned. From the prosecutors' statements, it is impossible to tell if the brothel recruited her inadvertently and did not know how to care for her properly while they figured out how to get rid of her, or if they were taking advantage of her illness in some way.

=== Interaction with clients ===
==== Sheik ====
The city is far enough south that during the summer there is daylight twenty-four hours a day. The premises opened at 8 pm. The police testimony at the trial described women arriving at the nightclub from the living quarters. The women were required to be on duty from 11 pm to 6 am and received one day off each week. (In one interview, Kinan said that the work shift started at 11:30 pm.) However, Kinan testified that shifts could extend to 8 am or even 2 pm. There was a listing near the bar with prices for drinks and women. The women were available for 15 minutes, 30 minutes, and 1 hour. Police witnesses said that men started arriving at the nightclub around midnight, and women would leave with the men, returning alone. When a customer left the nightclub with a woman, he had to pay the nightclub the price of a cup or half a cup, depending on how long the woman was going to be gone. (The nightclub paid 20 pesos for a drink and charged the customers 150 pesos, which the owner himself described as "cheating the customers".)

When the women first arrived at Ushuaia, the nightclub seems to have given them names to use while working. Kinan was given the name "Carla". The women wore shorts or dresses while working, with tops, exaggerated high heels, and carefully styled hair. Clothing was brightly colored. Police officers described the clothing as scanty and less than is normally worn in a pub. (This may be an exaggeration. The two sex workers in a photo taken at the Black & White Club in Ushuaia look like any two women at a bar.)

Women were not allowed to wear the same clothes two days in a row and were required to smell like imported perfume. According to the owner Montoya, they were to be "fine whores".

The nightclub Black & White had been raided about six months before the police raid at Sheik. Prior to the raid at Black & White, the women at Sheik had serviced their clients in the rooms where they lived. After the raid at Black & White, the women and their clients left Sheik and either went to the client's home or to a hotel room.

Women who were menstruating were required to staunch the flow with a sponge to avoid getting the client dirty.

Kinan described her clients as

politicians, municipal officials, government officials, even a commissioner would come and get me. Also those of fishing vessels and foreign tourists. And those who were going to ski that left the women in the hotels.

Until the raids, quecos, or tours of the brothels, were an accepted male pastime.

Women could be fined for refusing a client, for client complaints, or "delaying too much" with a client (i.e. going over the allotted time). For poor single women supporting children, the fines were coercive. If a woman tried to avoid a fine by accepting a client with a bad reputation and showed displeasure during an abusive session, she could end up earning less if the client complained and she was fined. The women's ability to manage or negotiate client behavior was considerably reduced. Even the fine for "delaying too much" placed her at the client's mercy. Kinan describes the result:

... you find yourself with a crazy boy, a healthy son of the patriarchy, who breaks your ass, who leaves the vagina hanging, with everything that indicates an aggressive sexual act ... I could not handle them when they removed the condom, they would put me on all fours and they would break me. There are no women with rights inside a brothel.

The nightclub had installed bells in the women's rooms that they could ring if they needed help, for example, if a client became violent. However, Kinan testified that often no one would come, the excuse being that the manager was busy with customers. In addition, women were expected to encourage clients to buy them the nightclub's overpriced drinks. The constant consumption of alcohol further reduced the women's ability to handle badly behaved clients. Kinan tells the following story, which illustrates the combined effects of coercive fines, too much alcohol, and managerial indifference:

One day I was smoking a cigarette and I see one of the girls, very young, Correntina, 18, who goes with an old man we already knew was terrible, a degenerate. Then I tell the manager not to let her go with that degenerate because she was very little. And he says, "Well, well, you're going to work." I say "poor girl," but I finished my cigarette and left, but then I see that he starts asking for the Fresita champagne, and takes seven in a period of an hour and a half, got drunk, a terrible state. I am very motherly, I always tried to take care of my companions, then I see that he is going to ask for the keys of the room where they had sex, and I tell the manager not to give them to him. But he leaves and I continue with what I was doing, I am preoccupied with my own work and I forget, it wasn't my job to monitor her, nor to take care of her, I had to take care of myself, for that there were the managers and so on. Then it was like five o'clock in the morning and the little girl appeared crying, she was still very drunk, and she says "he took me without a condom", and she tells me that she had fallen asleep from her drunkenness and he had raped her, I didn't know if there were one, five, or how many they had put into the room, and the manager only told her to take a bath in order to go to the hospital to ask for the pill the day after. And nobody saw anything, nobody heard anything, everything was covered because he was a customer and customers had to be taken care of.

In at least one instance, the managers punished a woman who used a bottle to defend herself against four clients who wanted to rape her. The information source doesn't say what the punishment was, only that it lasted a month. Her offense was failing to serve the clients well.

On the subject of condoms, if a client was too forceful during penetration and tore one, the women got a syringe full of vinegar in the vagina.

In regard to her experience with violent clients, Kinan says:

I have fought, my whole mouth is broken, because I fought to survive, with guys, with girls, guys might have paid me for a hotel and then they wanted to get me the same money they had given me because I do not know they did not like me, or they took too long and I had to go because I had to respond to a house, before the traffickers. [She had to return to the brothel.] Then they told me that they did not pay me anything or that I stayed until they told me. You have to endure rapes, consented or not, it is still a rape, if you are about to [be killed] you have to consent to a rape.

==== Black & White ====
The brothel operated from midnight to 6 am. According to an employee, the nightclub had the same clients found at Sheik: "... policemen, high-ranking officials, gendarmes and municipal personnel." The fines were similar to the fines imposed at Sheik, and a client complaint or a session that went over its allotted time could cost a woman over half of her share of the earnings from the session.

=== Alcohol and drugs ===
Alcohol and drugs were good options to be able to make this situation more bearable. ... we were forced to consume alcohol, we had to drink a lot, we used drugs to resist the long nights.

Aside from numbing effects of alcohol, the women were being paid to sell and consume drinks. The drinks the women persuaded the men to buy were an important source of income for both the women and the brothel. When a woman approached a potential client, she would tell him to buy her a drink. If a woman averaged two to three sessions per night (see Money section), that suggests that a woman's clients bought her at least two drinks on the average night. Since she was getting a share of the earnings from the drinks, it was in her interest, financially if not in terms of health, to persuade clients to buy her more. According to the U.S. National Institutes of Health, drinking more than three drinks per night or seven drinks per week is high-risk drinking for a woman.

Brothels didn't sell drugs as part of their business, but they were present. They show up in Kinan's interviews as part of the environment she worked in. If a client paid for an hour with a woman and wanted her to do a line of coke with him, the ever-present threat of fines and the pressure to keep the client happy would have made it hard to refuse. Stimulants would also counter the effects of alcohol and help the woman stay alert enough to continue working into the morning.

=== Money ===
==== Sheik ====
Police officers who entered Sheik undercover said that women would approach the clients and tell them to buy them a drink, which was paid for at the bar. When the women and their clients conducted their sessions at a hotel, payment for the room was made at the bar. However, the women seem to have collected the payment for their services directly from the clients and paid the nightclub's share to the manager. As mentioned in the Ushuaia section above, the women turned half of the money over to the nightclub.

The nightclub kept all the money for the first five drinks a woman persuaded customers to buy in one night, and then split the proceeds with the woman for all successive drinks. Kinan said that an average night for one woman was eighteen drinks and eight sessions with clients. (The Black & White section below gives an estimate of two to three clients per night.) Given the high price of the drinks, the women's share of the proceeds from their sale was probably an important source of income for them.

Reportedly, they were forced to buy clothes, shoes, jewelry, perfumes and condoms from the nightclub. Women were fined for taking too long to come when the bell was rung, for not cleaning, for taking longer than the client paid for, for taking a day off, for refusing to have sex with a client, and for a number of other offences.

Kinan described how the managers maintained the libro de pases. In the brothel trade, a pase is a session in which a prostitute provides sexual services to a client. A libro de pases is basically a log of the brothel's business activities.

==== Black & White ====
The recruitment pitch quoted above gives minimum prices for sessions of between 300 and 500 pesos, depending on the time involved. Actual prices were between 600 and 800 pesos. The women kept 60% to 70% of the fee. Black & White had the same system of fines as Sheik, with fines for being late, not cleaning, and going over the time the client had paid for, and so on. Most fines were around 300 pesos. The women were charged 400 pesos for each of the city's health inspections. The brothel transported women to Ushuaia by buying their airline tickets, and the women paid the brothel back from their earnings.

According to the testimony of the managers, each woman generated 900 pesos a night in earnings for the brothel. Since the brothel was keeping 30% to 40% of the client fees, and the women were charging between 600 and 800 pesos, and the brothel was earning money from the drinks the women sold, then the women were probably averaging two to three men per night, less than half of Kinan's estimate. That would have made traffic through the two brothel bedrooms a lot more manageable.

When the nightclub was raided, none of the women had more than fifteen pesos with them. Their earnings were held by the Morales family, "for safety." If they didn't have access to a bank, the house where they lived and where they had no control over who their house mates were was probably not a secure place to keep large sums of cash. Banking with the Morales family was probably more secure than cash under the mattress.

=== Credit and debt bondage ===
Claudia Quiroga, who managed Sheik at an earlier time, paid for the airline tickets that brought the women to Ushuaia, bought clothes, paid for lodging, and the women paid her back from their earnings. Kinan described this as credit extended from Quiroga personally, and the owner testified at his trial that the manager at the time of the police raid paid for the women's airplane tickets out of her salary. Presumably, the women would have repaid the manager and not the nightclub. This seems to show the managers personally making loans to the sex workers. On the other hand, the managers who made loans were part owners, and there may have been no clear line between their money and the nightclub's money.

At least some of the women who worked at Sheik arrived in such a state of poverty that the nightclub or its managers had to extend credit for the airplane fare, clothes for the women to wear while working, and housing. The employees would not have been able to work at Sheik and the nightclub would not have been able to recruit and keep employees without making loans to them.

Kinan has said "Every time we said we wanted to leave, we were told that we could not because we had debts," which suggests that employees were bound to the nightclub by debt bondage. Furthermore, the nightclub held the women's documentation, which may have made it difficult to travel or leave the nightclub. However, Kinan was working at the Black & White in 1996, which means she changed employer just a few months after she started working at Sheik. Without an accounting of the women's debts and a record of their movement between employers and into and out of the city, it's impossible to know how bound to their employers the women were.

Debt bondage usually involves high interest rates, which sometimes cause the debt to grow faster than it can be paid off. However, none of the available information on loans made to Sheik's employees mentions interest. That, plus the personal nature of the loans, suggests that the nightclub wasn't making money off the loans. On the other hand, it's entirely possible that managers tried to stop women from leaving before they had repaid loans owed to the managers personally.

The many and intrusive fines could have been a cause of debt bondage. If the fines were levied often enough they could have caused the women's debts to grow faster than they could pay them off. But again, the women seemed to move between brothels on their own initiative. The fines seemed to be more effective as a means of control while the women were employed than as a means of keeping them from leaving employment.

When Kinan first arrived in Ushuaia, the city was at the end of a manufacturing boom. Factory wages in Ushuaia were twice as high as they were in Buenos Aires. Baumol's cost disease indicates that service wages, including sex work wages, would also be doubled. But the cost of living was three times as high, meaning that both factory and service workers were earning less in real terms. During both periods that Kinan was working in Ushuaia as a sex worker, the cost of living was higher than more northern parts of Argentina. Anyone moving there for higher wages would discover that they were having trouble retaining the extra money they were earning. When the women at Sheik complained about not being able to hold on to a single peso, their complaints may have been due as much to the cost of living as to the fines and costs the brothel was imposing on them.

=== Children ===
I arranged for my daughters to be cared for away from me, so that they would not see the mother they had. [After the raid] all I wanted was to be with my daughters

Aside from feelings of shame, it simply would not have been possible to raise children in the brothel. The shared living spaces, the presence of clients and the sexual services provided in the living spaces, the working hours that extended to 6 am or later, and the sale of alcohol all ruled out the presence of children.

All of the women were mothers and all of them were living apart from their children. When Kinan's life was turned upside down by the police raid, her first impulse was to return to her children. A full understanding of the situation of Kinan and her coworkers would require an accounting of child care costs, knowing who provided child care and on what terms, and the complex of contradictory feelings they had toward their job and their children. That information isn't available.

=== Leaving employment ===
==== Sheik ====
As mentioned in the Recruitment section, sex workers in Ushuaia were recruited from all over Latin America, and Sheik itself had at least one recruiter. None of the available sources talk about leaving employment, but the presence of a recruiter shows that recruitment required more effort than the managers could devote to it on their own. Sheik employed only seven women and wasn't expanding its workforce, which indicates that women were leaving as fast as they were being recruited. As the city of the world closest to Antarctica, Ushuaia is isolated, has a harsh climate, and a small population. It doesn't attract a lot of people, making it necessary for the brothels to recruit from many countries to replace women leaving the city.

According to Kinan, women who behaved badly passed to other businesses where working conditions were worse. The owner of Sheik testified during the trial that he had had problems with Kinan and another woman and had intended to fire them. However, he never did, which suggests that he would have had trouble replacing them.

As mentioned above, Kinan changed employers once and left the brothel to move to Spain. The owner of Sheik reported hiring from other brothels and getting phone calls from women who wanted to work for him. If the constant debts and the withholding of documentation were intended to bind the workers to their employers, the measures weren't entirely successful.

==== Black & White ====
If, as indicated in the Recruitment section above, Black & White was recruiting three new employees every month, then it was also losing three employees every month. Women were leaving six months after they were hired. Victor Morales' less-than-honest recruitment pitch resulted in some women leaving as soon as they arrived. The woman who was unnerved by the security cameras simply lifted the chain and walked out the door.

One might imagine that the women who stayed would be the ones who had previous experience with sex work and were used to the work, but that's not necessarily the case. The two sex workers recruited from Rosario left at the first opportunity.

One of the women taken into custody during the raid was about to be transferred to another province because "she was a problem for the owner," according to one of her coworkers. Another woman was told that she was going to be sent to Spain. There's no mention of anyone actually being sent to another location, so these may have been empty threats made in an attempt to control someone's behavior.

While employed, the women didn't have possession of their earnings, which were held by the Morales family. This gave the managers an obvious way of collecting debts, provided the debt wasn't larger than the money the family held. In theory, the managers could have tried to prevent women from leaving the brothel by threatening to withhold their earnings, but none of the women appear to have complained about this happening. The fact that the cycle of recruitment and exit was so routine suggests that their exits were usually mutually agreed upon and the women left with their money.

The brothel held the identification documents of its employees. Almost all of them were at the bar in the nightclub, although a few were held in the owner's home. Getting a certificate of loss of documentation from the police is a matter of routine. The government of Argentina currently promises to provide replacement DNI cards within fifteen days of receiving an application. In the days of the libreta it reportedly could be done in a week to six weeks if there were no problems. Someone leaving the brothel and leaving their ID booklet behind could probably get a replacement.

The underage immigrant sex worker mentioned earlier that Morales recruited to work at the brothel doesn't seem to have been bound to the brothel when the managers held her documentation. When Morales recruited her, she was a seventeen-year-old immigrant from Paraguay who had been doing sex work prior to meeting him. She worked for him for two and a half years before leaving and making her way back to Buenos Aires. Several months after returning to Buenos Aires and just shortly before the police raid on Black & White, Morales showed up on her doorstep asking her to come back to the brothel. She was clearly an employee that Morales wanted to keep, but either he returned her documentation when she wanted to leave, or lack of documentation didn't stop her from leaving and traveling across the country. If she returned to Buenos Aires without documentation, she either had it replaced or managed without it.

At both Sheik and Black & White, fines, debt, and confiscating ID documentation may have helped managers control employee behavior, but they don't seem to have been particularly effective in preventing women from leaving. The ones that stayed the longest seemed to be the ones that had the worst job prospects. Alika Kinan and the Paraguayan immigrant both started sex work at seventeen because they couldn't support themselves any other way. Both came to Ushuaia in search of better-paid sex work. Both left after working in the brothels for roughly three years. Kinan returned after eleven years of marriage left her with three children and no better job prospects. Length of employment seems to have had more to do with poverty and lack of alternative jobs than anything else.

=== Self-image ===
Immediately after the police raid at Sheik, all of the women denied being victims of trafficking and stated that they were sex workers who had been hired to do sex work. Two of them, Alika Kinan and another woman who has not been publicly identified, changed their minds and testified as victims during the trial, which occurred four years after the raid.

Kinan described herself and her coworkers at the time of the police raid:

We felt like criminals. When the rescue occurs I deny that I am a victim of trafficking, I said that I was not a victim and that I wanted to leave. I had just been taken from where I was and was my only source of income. At that time I had four daughters and I wanted to run and look for them and I felt guilty, I felt that I had committed a crime ...

On her work:

The concept I had was that the bitch is the one who goes to bed with someone and does not charge, so I'm a prostitute because I lie down and I charge, inside everything I was proud of that. I always considered myself a fighter, who did whatever it took to support her family or my sister at that time or my daughters afterwards.

Her rejection of victimization at the time of the raid:

How I was going to be victim, with the lioness and fighter that I was!

On the brothels:

the cabarets and the whiskerías burn your hands [Working at the brothels was like pressing your hands against something hot enough to burn them.] But I never wanted to be there. You do not choose it, you don't say "I want to do this the rest of my days."

On the health inspections:

We were thought of as food undergoing a food safety inspection.

The effect of spending five hours in court describing life in the brothel:

When I testified, I realized that my life was shit.

== Victim ==
In October 2012 Argentinian authorities raided Sheik. Kinan and six other people retained were determined by the prosecuting authorities to be trafficking victims. This made her angry, but she gradually came to agree. She says that the thing that led her to change her mind was a question from the prosecutor's secretary:

If you analyze your history, that of your mother, that of your grandmother, that of your aunts, what do you think Is it going to be the destiny of your daughters?

This was followed by what she describes as a long, agonizing process of self-reflection.

The first year is terrible, it is a process of denial, you can not believe everything that is happening to you, you are trying to reconcile at a family level, a series of things, and it is not easy.

The city of Ushuaia supplied her with housing for one month and twenty days. The house had been declared uninhabitable by the Ministry of Social Development several months previously. At one point Kinan says her family almost died from fumes from a faulty water heater. The authorities' response was to shut off the gas, leaving them without heating. (Mean temperature in Ushuaia in the warmest month of the year is below 50 °F.) When the city tried to evict her at the end of the term, she turned to the María de los Angeles Foundation (founded by the mother of Marita Verón) for help, and the foundation's lawyers informed her that she was entitled to decent housing, work, subsidies, and to be reinserted into society. Kinan said:

I go back to the prosecution and I tell them that I was pressured to recognize myself as a victim and that now nobody wanted to represent me, that I had no psychologist and was in a house without heating. They destroyed me, made me recognize something that I never wanted to recognize, and when I recognize it, it turns out that I do not have the rights.

Through the intervention of governor Fabiana Ríos, Kinan was granted a plot of land by the city of Ushuaia and a subsidy of 250,000 pesos to build a house. She signed a contract for 259,224 pesos for the house construction, but the contractor was apparently unable to carry out the contract. As the Court of Accounts was setting a deadline and threatening to sue for return of the subsidy, the State Attorney filed a case for eviction, to remove Kinan and her family from the temporary housing she was living in until the new house was built. Her lawyer claimed that the necessary documents had been filed a month previously. He pointed out that it's not possible to build a house in Ushuaia for 250,000 pesos, and the prefab housing company Kinan signed a contract with couldn't meet the city's documentation requirements. In the end, he was able to stave off the eviction, but Kinan's temporary house continued to be unheated.

Kinan became a complainant in the criminal case against her managers, and simultaneously filed a civil suit against her ex-managers and the municipality of Ushuaia. The legal theory behind the civil suit seems to have been the following: The city conducted regular medical exams on each sex worker in the city's brothels and recorded the results in a book the city maintained for each sex worker. In doing this with each of the city's prostitutes, the city regularized prostitution and became legally complicit in any trafficking that occurred. When her ex-managers were convicted of trafficking in the criminal case, the city became liable for the harm Kinan suffered as a prostitute under the city's jurisdiction.

A social worker writing the initial report on Kinan concluded that she had not been a victim because she had not been submissive. When Kinan came to view herself as a victim, she made a claim to the authorities for her rights as a victim of trafficking, but was not recognized. She appealed to the courts, which refused her because the judge held that she had consented. At the next level of appeal, the appellate court found that there was a possibility that she had been a trafficking victim, but since she had not declared herself a victim when her employer was raided, she could not do so now. None of the available sources describe how this was resolved, but eventually she was recognized as a victim.

== Leadup to trial ==
On November 19, 2011, a woman from Tucumán province in Argentina filed a complaint, claiming that she had been exploited in a brothel called Sheik in Ushuaia. She claimed that she lived there with other women, between the ages of twenty-one and twenty-eight, who were natives of Argentine, the Dominican Republic, and Colombia. On April 12, 2012, the head of Prosecutor's Office for Trafficking and Exploitation of Persons filed a formal complaint in the Federal Court of Ushuaia against the brothel. After an investigation, the National Gendarmerie raided the nightclub on October 8, 2012.

The lead up to the trial involved the usual legal maneuvering. Originally there were six defendants, but three were dismissed by the investigating judge. The first of these was Claudia Quiroga, Pedro Montoya's ex-wife, who owned the property where Sheik was located and had been Montoya's business partner. The second was Corina Sánchez, who had been the on-site supervisor. These two were no longer involved with the brothel at the time of the raid. The third person dismissed from the trial was Jorge Etcheverry, recruiter and brother of Ivana García, Montoya's girlfriend and business partner when the raid occurred.

Kinan's lawyer objected to the dismissals. The investigating judge had postponed Kinan's testimony repeatedly, and eventually dismissed the three without evidence from Kinan. Her lawyer insisted that Kinan could "provide evidence, new data, more information regarding these accused and what their responsibility is." She appealed the dismissals, but they were sustained and the trial headed for the court date with only three defendants.

A week before the trial began, Kinan's sister and ex-husband began criticizing her publicly. The sister, Maria Fernanda, who still lives in Europe, sent Kinan's ex-husband a video of a sexual scene in which the female was purportedly one of Kinan's daughters. It was later proved that the video did not involve her daughter. Kinan's sister claimed that she had received it from someone in Ushuaia. Maria Fernanda said there was no truth in her sister's claims and she was concerned for her nieces. Kinan's ex-husband released the video to a journalist and claimed that his daughters were at risk. He was living in Scotland and said he couldn't afford to travel to Ushuaia, but offered to testify against his ex-wife via videoconference.

She also began getting threats. On a street in downtown Ushuaia, a group of people shouted ""Be careful what you are going to say at the trial." She received threats and insults on her cell phone and through her Facebook account. The trial prosecutor called the threats "a well organized operation." The week before the trial she felt so threatened that she kept herself and her family in the house. The police guarded her house until the beginning of the trial, and she joined a witness protection program.

On a positive note, she got a new personal lawyer for the trial, a woman she felt she could trust: Marcela Rodríguez, the coordinator of the Counseling and Sponsorship Program for Victims of Trafficking in Persons of the Office of the Ombudsman. And a large number of social and feminist organizations organized in her support.

== Trial ==
Because she continued to receive threats during the trial, Kinan's protectors restricted her movement and communication. One observer pointed out that the people eventually convicted of trafficking her were not detained and enjoyed complete freedom of movement and communication.

Argentina doesn't have separate civil and criminal courts, and the civil and criminal cases against Kinan's managers at the nightclub Sheik were carried out simultaneously before the same panel of judges. During the trial, Kinan testified in a Gesell chamber, so that the accused were not able to witness her testimony. A witness known only as "F" testified under the same conditions.

=== Criminal trial ===
The defendants were charged with violating Argentina's anti-trafficking law. The law has a four-part test for trafficking: recruitment; transport; receiving and/or harboring persons; and exploitation. (See Human trafficking in Argentina.) The prosecution claimed that the defendants recruited by advertising in media, they transported their victims by advancing money for their plane tickets, and they received and harbored them by meeting them at the airport and bringing them to the brothel and housing them there. To show exploitation they claimed that the victims had characteristics of social vulnerability when recruited, and that they were bound to the brothel by debts and rules that compromised their ability to leave when they chose.

The prosecutors argued that requiring the women to use a sponge during menstruation was proof that the women weren't working willingly. (Many independent escorts use a sponge so their clients will not know that they are menstruating, and some prefer the sponge to the usual tampons and sanitary napkins. However, women vary a lot in the pain they experience during menstruation. Even a woman who usually doesn't have problems may have a bad month. Escorts participating in a discussion of this on an on-line forum said that forcing women to work when they feel bad or need rest is exploitative, even if the sponge itself isn't a problem.)

Kinan's lawyer argued that the defendants' actions violated the 1949 UN protocol on trafficking, which Argentina has signed. (See Convention for the Suppression of the Traffic in Persons and of the Exploitation of the Prostitution of Others.) She pointed out that under the protocol, a victim's consent is immaterial.

Montoya's lawyer made the following arguments:

[The night club was a] duly authorized establishment and the accusation of sex in exchange for money has not been proven and there were no places where they had sex. There is no concrete proof of these federal crimes.

He pointed out that Montoya had faced a similar charge in the provincial court in 2011 and the case had been dismissed.

... now the same complaint has been reissued in Federal, therefore we will ask for acquittal.

Excerpts from Pedro Montoya's testimony:

I am being tried for a crime that I consider to be aberrant. I do not consider that I have deviated from the law. I do not see them as victims but rather as majority partners. I am the minority partner of the ladies.

[Trafficking] is a fashionable crime.

This is a trade in which we take advantage of both of a man's needs, because the man needs to go to a place to look for company. The public goes and the women act as psychologists ... Sometimes men went after spending forty days on board.

The girl is in the capacity of entertainer because they are to entertain and be a companion of a person. It is a service of accompaniment or entertainment that is framed in the Collective Agreement of Work according to an ordinance of the Deliberating Council.

[Clients] had to pay the value of a glass for the time that they were going to be absent from the place ... I consider relationships outside the nightclub to be an agreement between two people, it is not my problem.

There was no [criminal] organization here at all. This business made me tired, it caused me psychophysical discomforts and even losses sometimes.

I asked my lawyer and he answered that we were not guilty of any crime and we were under the ordinances in force, subject to inspections, of all the Armed Forces, Gendarmerie, Police, Migrations, Public Ministry of Labor, Sadaic, Capif, DGR Province and, of course, Municipality Of Ushuaia, licensing organs that always inspected the commercial activity carried out. I always thought I was doing a lawful job.

=== Civil trial ===
A team of psychologists and psychiatrists asserted that Kinan suffered from PTSD which caused sleep disorders and made her afraid of embracing and of touching things that had passed through many hands, such as money. They recommended psychological counseling three times a week for twenty years, which would cost 2,496,000 pesos at current prices. In addition, scars on her face and missing teeth were physical evidence of the violence she had suffered. The experts testified that Kinan is expected to be 70% incapacitated.

The municipality of Ushuaia argued that it had no legal liability because any laws and international treaties violated by the brothel's actions fell under the jurisdiction of the federal and provincial governments, and the city's actions had all been consistent with law. It also pointed out that it was cooperating with a foundation created by Alika Kinan for the purpose of assisting victims of trafficking.

The doctor from Ushuaia Regional Hospital who issued the health books testified. When asked if she ever issued health books to men, she said she only issued them to women and "sex change."

== Outcome of trial ==
On 30 November 2016, the court decided in Kinan's favor. The city of Ushuaia was ordered to pay Kinan 780,000 pesos (about US$47,000.) The owner of Sheik received a prison sentence of seven years and a fine of 70,000 pesos. His girlfriend/business partner got a three-year suspended sentence and a fine of 30,000 pesos. The woman who managed the club received a three-year suspended sentence. As part of the suspended sentences, the court placed restrictions on where the two women could reside, required them to avoid overconsumption of alcohol, and ordered them to refrain from using narcotics. The prosecutor stated that even though the penalties were less than the prosecution had requested, the verdict was a change in the way the judicial system viewed sex trafficking.

== Epilogue ==
On 1 December 2016, the court published the grounds for its decision. At that point, the convicted exercised their right of appeal and remained free. Kinan continues to feel anxiety over the outcome and she's also still getting threats. The protective personnel provided by the government Program for Rescue were withdrawn. In 2018, Pedro Montoya lost his appeal before the Court of Criminal Cassation and will serve his seven-year prison term. The civil judgment against the Municipality of Ushuaia was confirmed, i.e. the court confirmed that the city had been involved in trafficking Kinan. The fines against Montoya and his girlfriend/business partner were confirmed, and the money was ordered to be used to pay the compensation ordered for Kinan, with any surplus to go to a trafficking victims fund maintained by the Ministry of Justice.

The Ushuaia city counsel ended the licensing of brothels in 2013, effectively putting them all out of business. Many of the women left to continue sex work elsewhere. Most of them went to Punta Arenas in Chile. A ferry service connects Punta Arenas with the island of Tierra del Fuego where Ushuaia is located, making it easy to move there. The brothels of southern Chile are active, operate similarly to the ones driven out of Ushuaia, and Punta Arenas is visited by the same types of ships that gave Ushuaia many of its customers for its sex business.

The women left, but they've been replaced. There are still places where you can rent a room for an hour. There's a wider variety of business models, but the dominant one is reportedly the private apartment. While Kinan and her coworkers lived two to a room, the new model is three to an apartment. If sex workers in Ushuaia benefited from closing the brothels, it was primarily from the change in housing; they now have hot water. Women still come from the same places far away from Ushuaia, but they rotate in and out faster. Advertising is done on the web, where the pictures and names change, but the phone numbers stay the same. Periodically, the police raid an apartment and liberate its occupants, rendering them homeless until they can reconnect with their pimps. While they are working for their pimps, they are plagued by the same system of debts that plagued Kinan and her coworkers. When the police liberate them, they become homeless mothers with no way of supporting their children. Kinan believes that the official count of rescued women is inflated because many of the women have been rescued one or more times previously.

Why do the victims relapse? Because they have no resources, because there are no public policies, because politicians make policy under the banner of "Not One Less" but they haven't filed even one bill that protects women. The trafficking law came without legs, it doesn't function. I am grateful because it rescued me and freed me from a brothel, helped me grow as a militant and empower me. But after I was released, after being told that I was a victim all these years and that I had to go home with my daughters I thought "What do I live for? What I do?" The Law of Trafficking doesn't work without public policies, that is to say, access to housing, therapeutic psychological support for victims of trafficking, reintegration into genuine work and access to education.

Kinan currently works at the National University of San Martín, in Buenos Aires, doing research and giving lectures on human trafficking, and organizes activities related to the same topic.

== Kinan on sex work ==
Kinan is an abolitionist opposed to decriminalization. She believes that trafficking can only be abolished by giving women the things that she herself has struggled for.

I always insist, when you ask me if I am an abolitionist, yes, I am because I am convinced that if a woman in a state of vulnerability, who is being sexually exploited, you give her or she is given a series of instruments to defend herself in life, education, a well-paid job, not one in the informal economy where she earns little, decent housing where she can support her family even though she is single, I'm sure that woman does not prostitute herself, I'm totally convinced she does not arrive at prostitution. Then, by that point, I consider myself an abolitionist ...

In Kinan's view, women enter sex work because they lack housing, jobs, and education. But she also views sex workers as trapped by not understanding that they are victims and have rights.

Because you are very afraid, you are not sure if you are a victim or you are not a victim, you don't become aware if you are a victim, if you knew that you were a victim, you would ask for help immediately. Social myth is "Why don't these women who are locked up ask for help at the time? Why don't they come out screaming that they are in these places where they are being exploited sexually, if as a society we know this is wrong?" Because the victims do not know, because they have a great ignorance about international treaties signed by our country, there is a great ignorance that our country is abolitionist.

For Kinan, the alternative to abolishing sex work is regulating it. Her experience of regulation was the medical exams at Ushuaia, where physicians authorized by the city ridiculed and disparaged the sex workers they were examining. This combined with similar treatment from clients leads her to place regulators and clients in interlocking roles.

The Municipality set up the sanitary notebooks, very much like Senasa or bromatological analysis. [SENASA is the federal food safety agency in Argentina.] Did you see when you go to buy meat in the supermarket? There you walk down the aisle and you see that everything has passed through sanitary inspections, and that the meat is fit for human consumption. And you are one more piece of meat. The client of prostitution enters the premises and says I'm having a ribeye, or a piece of beef, a hamburger. You feel like the merchandise that has given up its own will, to be consumed, to be raped.

Kinan wants to attack commercialized sex in three steps. First is the end of government regulation and shutting down sex-related businesses via the existing anti-trafficking law. The next step is to eliminate the commodity being sold by giving women the resources that make it unnecessary for them to turn to sex work for survival.

At the moment the most important thing is to be able to conjoin the Law of Trafficking with real public policies, that restore the rights of the victims in terms of housing and labor solutions. And the supportive therapy and the ability to provide them with education.

Failure to take this step means that women return to their traffickers.

When we talk about Human Rights, it is wonderful that we have the closure of brothels, which are clandestine and non-clandestine centers of torture and sexual exploitation, but what do we do to avoid having the same victim show up in later raids, as has happened?

The final step is to eliminate the buyer by criminalizing the client, but this must proceed from the second step described above, which Kinan calls "the restoration of rights."

We have a lot of work ahead of us, regarding the restoration of rights, of women who are victims of trafficking and from there to be able to advance in a direct line on the criminalization of the client of prostitution.

Argentina has a union of sex workers called Ammar that is part of CTA, a trade union federation. As a sex worker, Kinan saw herself as a strong woman doing a difficult job, but she now believes that viewpoint is a part of victimization.

I saw myself as a strong woman who had come there because I had no choice, a concept that is also part of the crime of trafficking, because that is what you are made to believe when you enter the circuit.

She has no sympathy for Ammar or other sex worker rights organizations, viewing them as essentially the same as the managers at the brothels where she worked.

For me Ammar is a union and acts as such, these women have never stood at the street corners, none of them are kept in the brothels as victims, but they have presided over brothels and have presided over women. My personal opinion is that they are trying to take care of their backs for future raids that are made for the crime of trafficking. It is not innocent that they have gone from claiming rights and guarantees as autonomous prostitutes and today demand the reopening of brothels. Argentina and the Constitution are abolitionist, where clearly we are not going to allow prostitution to exist on behalf of others.

== Discrepancies ==
Part of Alika Kinan's story is the fact that news sources report things about her that are contradicted by other sources. Since there's no way of knowing why different information is being reported a different times, nothing in this section should be taken as evidence that anyone is intentionally being untruthful.

=== Age of arrival at Ushuaia ===
In at least two different interviews, Kinan has apparently said that she was eighteen years old when she arrived at Ushuaia. Another source said she was fifteen. She was reportedly born on June 24, 1976. She has said that she was thirty six when Sheik was raided in 2012, and in 2017 she said that she was forty one, both of which would be consistent with a 1976 birth date. Various sources state that she came to Ushuaia to work at Sheik in 1996. A recent source states that she arrived in Ushuaia in April, 1996, which would make her nineteen, but only two months shy of her twentieth birthday.

=== Time in sex work ===
One source says Kinan was trapped by prostitution for twenty years. Another says that she was trapped in a brothel for nearly twenty years. Another claims that she was "a victim of trafficking networks and male clients for two decades." And another says she was "a victim of forced prostitution for 16 years."

She did sex work in Córdoba for three years, worked in brothels in Ushuaia for three years, and after returning to Ushuaia from Spain, worked in one brothel for another two years. These three time periods add up to about eight years.

=== Number of brothels ===
When news reports say that Kinan was trapped in a brothel for twenty years, they're referring to the brothel named Sheik. In Córdoba, she worked at a brothel named Aries. In Ushuaia, she worked at both Sheik and Black & White.

=== Entrapment ===
On the subject of entrapment, a writer familiar with the details of Kinan's history wrote that "Alika Kinan was not kidnapped or cheated..."

One news report says that she was held prisoner. The sources cited use the word "trapped" in a context implying some sort of physical coercion. In Córdoba she didn't live in the brothel. The brothel work paid for the place she rented for herself and her younger sister. While working at Black & White she rented another place for her sister, indicating that she could travel around the city and conduct business. While working at Sheik, she had keys to the entrance to her living quarters. She worked under abusive and exploitative conditions, compelled by poverty and the need to support people dependent on her. But she has ruled out physical coercion in two different interviews.

As far as trickery or deceptive recruiting is concerned, in Córdoba there was no need for the brothel to recruit her. She and her sister were starving, she was desperate, and she had no alternatives. She went to Ushuaia to work at Sheik because they paid better. It's not clear why she moved from Sheik to Black & White, but at Sheik she kept fifty percent of the client fees and at Black & White she kept sixty to seventy percent. Also, the women at Black & White didn't have to entertain their clients in their living quarters.

=== Number of clients per night ===
In 2015 a news report said that Kinan had up to ten or twelve clients a night. In 2016 she estimated an average of eight clients per night. In 2017, she told one interviewer that she had seen fifteen to thirty men per night, and she told another that she had twenty to thirty men per night.

As stated in the Money section above, brothel revenue data indicates that the women working in the brothels were averaging two to three clients per night.

=== Isolation ===
According to NPR, the women working in the brothel couldn't make friends outside the brothel. In Córdoba, Kinan actually did have friends outside the brothel. At both brothels in Ushuaia, she appears to have had freedom of movement outside the brothels. However, Ushuaia was a small city, everyone knew what she did for a living, and sex work has a lot of stigma. She probably was socially isolated, but mostly because of the stigma associated with her work.

== Personal life ==
Kinan supported President Javier Milei in an Instagram post the day of his inauguration.
