= Vidas robadas (Argentine TV series) =

Argentinian television series

- Genre: Police procedural
- Created by: Marcelo Camaño; Guillermo Salmerón
- Based on: Marita Verón case
- Written by: Marcelo Camaño; Guillermo Salmerón
- Directed by: Miguel Colom
- Starring: Facundo Arana; Soledad Silveyra; Juan Gil Navarro; Mónica Antonópulos; Virginia Innocenti; Romina Ricci; Jorge Marrale
- Theme music composer: David Bolzoni
- Opening theme: Yo Renaceré
- Country of origin: Argentina
- Original language: Spanish
- No. of seasons: 1
- No. of episodes: 131

Production
- Producer: Telefe Contenidos

Original release
- Network: Telefe
- Release: March 3 – October 29, 2008

Vidas Robadas (Spanish for Stolen Lives, but officially translated as Taking Lifes) is a dramatic telenovela that aired on Telefe from March 3 to October 29, 2008, with a final broadcast performed at the Opera Theater. Its 134 episodes averaged about 16 ratings points. It was directed by Miguel Colom. The story unfolds in the context of abduction of persons for forced prostitution, and draws parallels with the case of Marita Verón. Susana Trimarco herself, mother of Marita Veron, worked with the scriptwriters Marcelo Camaño and Guillermo Salmerón.

The story revolves around Juliana Miguez, a girl from Rio Manso, fictional town in the Province of Buenos Aires, who is kidnapped by a network of human trafficking. It represents her point of view, from within the network, that of his mother, who tries to find and rescue her through various means, and the criminals who run that operating system. At first the story is held equally by that history and a telenovela plot involving Facundo Arana, the most famous actor of the cast, but the acclaim achieved by the most committed portion of the plot led to this one to include the whole story and all characters thereof. Bautista Amaya's character, played by Arana, reaches characteristics of an action hero instead of those of a gentleman of a normal telenovela.

Like other previous novels as Resistiré, El Deseo or Montecristo, fiction was used as a means of social criticism. The series was declared of social interest by the city legislature of Buenos Aires and the House of Representatives of Argentina, and also won numerous awards, which emphasize the Martin Fierro de Oro in 2009.

== Cast ==
- Facundo Arana... Bautista Amaya
- Soledad Silveyra... Rosario Soler
- Juan Gil Navarro... Nicolas Duarte
- Mónica Antonópulos... Ana Monserrat
- Patricio Contreras... Juan Miguez
- Virginia Inoccenti... Nacha
- Jorge Marrale... Astor Monserrat
- Fabio Di Tomaso... Octavio Amaya
- Brenda Gandini... Agustina Amaya
- Arturo Bonín... Manuel Amaya
- Adrián Navarro... Dante Mansilla
- Silvia Kutica... Alejandra Ferro
- Carlos Portaluppi... Fabio Pontevedra
- Romina Ricci... Inés
- Sofía Elliot... Juliana Miguez
- Ludovico Di Santo... Pato Patricio Sabatini
- Matías Baroffio... Joaquín Duarte
- Ailén Gerrero... Ema Amaya
- Guillermo Pfening... Mateo Ferro
- María Carambula... Carla
- Lucas Escariz... Rodrigo
- Magela Zanotta... Andrea
- Gogó Andreu... Gregorio
- Mabel Manzotti... Amanda (Madre de Fabio Pontevedra)

== Plot ==
=== Juliana's kidnapping ===
The central plot of the story revolves around Juliana Miguez (Sophia Elliot), a young woman who is abducted at Rio Manso and entered by force into a prostitution ring. Her parents, Rosario Soler (Soledad Silveyra) and Juan Miguez (Patricio Contreras) since then do everything in their power to find and retrieve their daughter. They soon discover that the police would not really help, and even collaborate with the network. Rio Manso, the site where the story goes, is not a real site: although there is a homonymous site at the south of the province of Corrientes, the scenes that take place in that town were filmed at Carlos Keen, of Buenos Aires province, and in the plot is mentioned as a bonaerense village.

The prostitution ring is managed by the powerful businessman Astor Montserrat (Jorge Marrale) and his assistants Nicolas Duarte (Juan Gil Navarro) and Dante Mansilla (Adrián Navarro). Monserrat seems to possess many legal properties such as industries and buildings, which give an image of a respectable businessman, but are actually front organizations for laundering the money earned from prostitution.

Another of the protagonists is Bautista Amaya (Facundo Arana), an anthropologist widowed at the beginning of the novel as Duarte runs over his wife with his car and not left in place to help her. Baptist casually begins an affair with Ana (Mónica Antonopulos), who rescues when trapped in the mountains. Ana is the daughter of Astor, but completely ignores the activities of his father. Bautista discovered that Duarte was the one who ran over his wife and fled, but ignoring its relationship with the father of Anna

At first the plots of Rosario and Bautista followed different development until Rosario contacted Bautista and asked for his professional help. From that point, Bautista works with Rosario at her foundation in the search for Juliana. Along with Bautista also joins retired prosecutor Fabio Pontevedra (Carlos Portaluppi), with contacts in the judiciary. Bautista usually operates alongside former police also known as "El Tano" (Daniel Peyras), weapons specialist.

=== The network ===
Duarte had taken Juliana as a ward, and was in his possession until Montserrat removed his support for Duarte and tried to kill him, after which he became a fugitive. Juliana went on to be in psession of Astor himself, who comes under pressure from his wife Nacha (Virginia Innoccenti) for the release. By that time, Juan Miguez, who was shot in prison for killing a pimp, was strangled by his cellmate, hitman of Astor Montserrat. Taking advantage of the ignorance of Rosario and others about their involvement, Astor joins them, and prepares an assembly to simulate a negotiation with the kidnappers, who are really his subordinates. But when they were about to do the liberation he discovers that Juliana had seen him once, so he recaptures her.

After this, Pontevedra's investigations are beginning to shed evidence that the head of the mafia would be Astor, and also found other evidence connecting him with Claudio Kurtz, a leader of the mafia which meet all other leaders and not shown in person until the end of the series. At first Bautista refuses to accept those versions, since Montserrat is the father of his girlfriend.

The foundation located "El Griego" ("The Greek"), a dealer who handled the sale of sex slaves outside the country, and posing for treating Rosario talks to buy several with a similar profile to that of her daughter, using money stolen from one of the disrupted operations. While thus achieving the freeing of several young prostitutes, Juliana was not in the group: being unaware that the buyer was actually Rosario, Dante took Juliana to prevent her being sold, and sent instead to Nicolas Duarte exiled in the Triple Frontier. Meanwhile, the prosecutor Marcela Urquiza, who was conducting the case, is first threatened and then murdered in a parking lot.

=== Monserrat's suicide ===
Astor's situation gets increasingly complicated. The pressure of the Foundation, the incriminating evidence against him and the rejection of his family were added for the return of Duarte and the abandonment of Dante. His contacts and other Mafia leaders withdrew their support at the level of media exposure that reaches for Juliana. This means that, when police surrounded his house to take custody, Montserrat simulates to perform a suicide, although in reality it was a person of similar texture to his who committed suicide disfiguring his face. After the apparent death, prosecutor Pascale (Jorge D'Elia) takes over the case. At first follow the advice of the Foundation, but when Duarte sends an anonymous video in which Bautista seems to commit the murder of Luz, a woman infiltrated in the network of trafficking to find her daughter, Bautista becomes a fugitive from the law and Pascale ignores them and tries to capture him.

While Montserrat is hidden in the residence of his ex-wife Helena (Marita Ballesteros), the only one who knows his situation as well as the maid Valeria (Carla Crespo) who ignores his identity, Nacha joins the society of Mansilla and Duarte. They try to forcibly take control of the network, but are resisted by the other leaders. Nacha invites secretly Duarte and Mansilla to live at the ranch. However, shortly after going there, Julian tries to escape by hiding in the trunk of a hitman who was leaving. Discovering his attempt to escape, Mansilla does not request that they send her back, but take her to another place to get more humiliating treatment, as punishment.

However, once in their new destination, a client of the brothel record a video of Juliana with a cell phone and uploads it to a pornographic website. He is discovered by employees of Bautista, which located the brothel because its name is seen in the background. A doctor determines that Juliana would be pregnant, presumably of Duarte, and that his health is very delicate. Upon hearing, Duarte attempt to rescue and return her to the ranch, but are stopped en route by members of Montserrat who, pretending to be police officers, will go with her. Then they reported by telephone to Montserrat that Juliana had died by the medical complications mentioned.

Meanwhile, Bautista was kept hidden in a house in the Delta del Tigre. In this situation he was trying to avoid being found by both the justice and Duarte. One of the sex slaves freed, Daniela (Eleonora Wexler) sought a daughter she had while in captivity and that he had been removed, and began to think that Emma, the adopted daughter of Inés and Octavio (Bautista's brother) could be her daughter. Octavio was prepared to allow a DNA test, but Inés refused it outright. Believing that justice would try to take Emma, is brought into contact with Bautista to escape with her. Bautista prevents it, and the appointment to a dock for a chat. After the meeting, Bautista is located in Duarte by men who kill Inés and persecute Bautista at the Delta rivers. Finally, is rescued by Fabio and Tano. Then, they send it ceased to be a fugitive being protected witness.

=== The Urquillo brothers ===
From the suggested kidnapping and death of Juliana (not shown on screen), for a number of episodes it was not clear if she was still alive in the hands of the brothers Unquillo responsible for his capture, or if they died. Nicolas Unquillo even indicate a site with a body buried in that state that would have left after his death.

Shortly after she left the country, Bautista discovers that Helena, Montserrat ex-wife and birth mother of Ana, hidden Montserrat at her country house. Tano and Bautista go to the place to capture him, but Bautista is shot and Tano takes him to the hospital, letting Montserrat escape. Bautista receives surgery for the gunshot wound received, and finally manages to save his life and recovered without sequelae of magnitude. After his escape, Montserrat goes into hiding in the company of Unquillo.

Meanwhile, Rosario keeps track of Juliana at the company of the Unquillo, and to spy on the activities of the former manages to be hired as a maintenance worker. During the time she remains in the company discovers that the Unquillo stores the bulk of the monetary proceeds of the Network.

== Awards ==
=== Martín Fierro Awards ===
Year	Category	Nominee	Result
2008	Martín Fierro de Oro		Won
2008	Mejor Telenovela		Won
2008	Mejor Director	Miguel Colom	Won
2008	Mejor Autor / Libretista	Marcela Camaño; Guillermo Salmerón	Won
2008	Mejor Actor - Telenovela	Facundo Arana	Nominated
2008	Mejor Actor - Telenovela	Jorge Marrale	Ganador
2008	Mejor Actor - Telenovela	Juan Gil Navarro	Nominated
2008	Mejor Actriz - Telenovela	Soledad Silveyra	Won
2008	Mejor Actriz - Telenovela	Virginia Innocenti	Nominated
2008	Actor de reparto - Drama	Adrián Navarro	Nominated
2008	Actor de reparto - Drama	Carlos Portaluppi	Won
2008	Actríz de reparto - Drama	Mabel Manzotti	Nominated
2008	Participación Especial en Ficción	Guillermo Francella	Won
2008	Participación Especial en Ficción	Pompeyo Audivert	Nominated
2008	Mejor Canción Original	"Yo Renaceré" interpretado por David Bolzoni	Nominated

=== Clarín Awards ===
Year	Category	Nominee	Result
2008	Mejor Ficción Diaria - Drama		Won
2008	Mejor Actor - Drama	Jorge Marrale'	Won
2008	Mejor Director		Won
2008	Mejor Actor - Drama	Juan Gil Navarro	Nominated
2008	Mejor Actriz - Drama	Soledad Silveyra	Won
2008	Mejor Actriz - Drama	Virginia Innocenti	Nominada
2008	Revelación Masculina	Esteben Meloni	Won
2008	Revelación Femenina	Carla Crespo	Nominated
2008	Revelación Femenina	Juliana Vallina	Nominated
2008	Revelación Femenina	Sofía Elliot	Won
