= Kisses on the Forehead =

- Sbaraglia and Papaleo in a scene of the film
- Spanish: Besos en la frente
- Directed by: Carlos Galettini
- Screenplay by: Carlos Galettini; Luisa Irene Ickowicz
- Based on: Una margarita llamada Mercedes (play) by Jacobo Langsner
- Produced by: Raúl Outeda
- Starring: China Zorrilla; Leonardo Sbaraglia; Claudio García Satur; Carolina Papaleo; Alejandra Flechner; Mabel Manzotti
- Cinematography: Hector Morini
- Edited by: Juan Carlos Macías
- Production company: Sinfonía Otoñal S.A.
- Distributed by: Sinfonía Otoñal S.A. Argentina Video Home
- Release date: 5 September 1996
- Running time: 95 min.
- Country: Argentina
- Language: Spanish

Kisses on the Forehead (Spanish: Besos en la frente) is a 1996 Argentine drama film written and directed by Carlos Galettini and starring China Zorrilla and Leonardo Sbaraglia. The film is based in the play by Jacobo Langsner Una margarita llamada Mercedes, which he wrote for (and was premiered by) Zorrilla, about the love between a high-class old Grand-Dame and a young writer just arrived from Montevideo to Buenos Aires City. The film premiered on 5 September 1996 in Buenos Aires and was nominated for two Silver Condor Awards in 1997.

== Cast ==
- China Zorrilla ... Mercedes Arévalo
- Leonardo Sbaraglia ... Sebastián Miguez
- Claudio García Satur ... Fabio
- Carolina Papaleo ... Estela
- Alejandra Flechner ... Casilda
- Mabel Manzotti ... Raquel
- Leonardo Abremor ... Musical Director
- Daniel Alvaredo ... Driver
- Gustavo Bucciarelli ... Soundman
- Henan Carbonero ... Kid
- Fernanda Caride ... Silvia
- Dario Casas ... Gardner
- Lorena Colotta ... Musician 3
- Daniel Di Biase ... Doctor (as Daniel Dibiase)
- Jorge Dorio ... Raquel's husband
- Lucio Herrera ... Musician 2
- Cecilia Labourt ... Mercedes' Mother
- Hilda Mantovani ... Woman in Pension
- Alberto Mariotti ... Musician 1
- Nieves Martín ... Grandma Mercedes
- Francisco Nápoli ... Director de Cine
- Germán Palacios ... Young Protagonist in The Film
- Melina Petriella ... Young Mercedes
- Angela Ragno ... Woman Protagonist in The Film
- Pablo Rinaldi ... Mercedes' Father
- Erica Rivas ... Laura
- César Vianco ... Pedro Luis
- Leonardo Lin ... Double of light of Leonardo Sbaraglia
