= Susana Trimarco =

Argentine activist

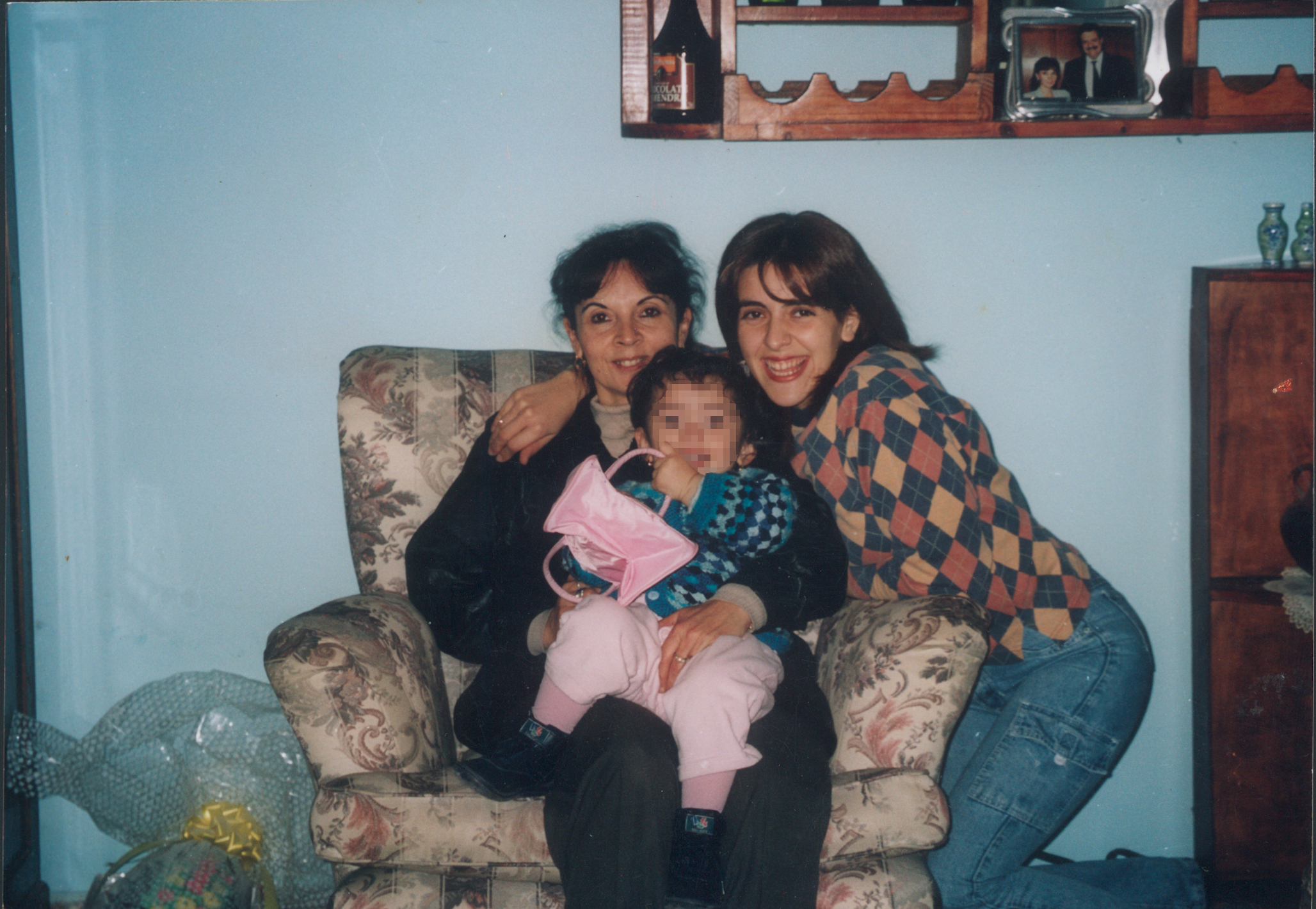
- Trimarco (left) with family
- Born: Sara Susana del Valle Trimarco de Veron; 1954 (age 71–72); Tucumán, Argentina
- Citizenship: Argentinian
- Occupation: Activist
- Spouse: Daniel Verón (m. 1975; died 2010)
- Children: María de los Ángeles
- Awards: Women of Courage (2007); Premio Cristo Rey (2008); Premio Sarmiento (2011)
- Website: Fundación María de los Ángeles

Sara Susana del Valle Trimarco de Veron, or Susana Trimarco (born 1954), is an Argentinian human rights activist, whose efforts to combat human trafficking and corruption have been recognized internationally. After the 2002 disappearance of her daughter, who is believed to have been kidnapped by a human trafficking network, she spent years searching for her, and started a foundation to support victims of sex trafficking. Her lobbying is credited with bringing corruption and government impunity to the fore in Argentina, a discussion which led to a 2011 law banning the advertisement of sexual services in newspapers and magazines.

== Life ==
Susana Trimarco's daughter Marita (born María de los Ángeles) was kidnapped in San Miguel de Tucumán, the capital of Tucumán Province, on April 3, 2002. Twenty-two-year-old Marita had gone to a doctor appointment when, according to a witness, she was pulled into a red car. It is believed that she was forced into prostitution.

Trying to find her, Trimarco began to visit brothels dressed as a prostitute. She received threats and was given false clues in order to mislead her search. Her investigations led to the release of other women deprived of their liberty, but her daughter is still missing.

In 2007, Trimarco founded the Fundación María de los Ángeles ("María of the Angels Foundation") in order to rescue kidnapped girls in Argentina. It claims to have achieved the release of hundreds.

In February and March 2012, Trimarco testified at the trial of 13 people, including police officers, who were accused of kidnapping Marita Veron and selling her to human traffickers. All the defendants were acquitted on December 12, 2012.

In December 2012, seven men and six women were charged with Marita's kidnapping, but acquitted in a Tucuman criminal court. A week later, Trimarco met with Argentina's president, and impeachment proceedings were started against the 3 judges who had delivered the verdict. In December 2013, ten of the original 13 defendants were convicted of the kidnapping and sexual exploitation of Marita Verón.

== Personal investigations ==
After just a few hours past her disappearance, Trimarco began frantically searching for her daughter and filtering reports of sightings. A street prostitute said she had heard about the kidnapping. About a dozen people called in, all with the same story, and each caller described a woman who could have been Marita. Whenever Trimarco asked for police help the authorities proved to be unhelpful. "Whatever way I told the police to look, they would look the opposite way", she said.

Trimarco quoted: "I screamed until I couldn't scream anymore. And then I realized that I had to be strong. I had to think with my head and not just my heart. These people were powerful, and I was a nobody, and I had no money, no power, no resources. I had to be smarter than them if I wanted to get my daughter back". She began investigating on her own. She started dressing up as a prostitute and visiting bars in La Rioja that doubled as brothels. She got the phone numbers of people she suspected of being involved in trafficking and called them saying she wanted to buy girls. In June 2002, she set up a meeting with a female trafficker and gained access to a safe house where 12 girls were being held hostage. "Minors or adults?" the woman asked her. When Trimarco said minors, the woman told her each girl would cost her a minimum of 3500 pesos. Promising to return with the funds Trimarco left and informed the police, who then saved the girls.

With the support of a police investigator named Jorge Tobar, Trimarco began tracking and documenting a vast human-trafficking network with ties to the police, the legal system and government officials. In October 2002, Trimarco and another three Chilean journalists went undercover in La Rioja. Trimarco conducted many similar operations which continuously led to the finding and rescuing of new trafficked girls. In more than a decade of work, she has returned hundreds of girls to their families. Eventually, Trimarco got a tip stating that Marita had been sent to Spain. So Trimarco traveled there to investigate. The trip resulted in the rescue of 25 girls from Burgos and other Spanish cities, 19 of whom were from Argentina and Central America.

Throughout her missions, Trimarco risked her life on several occasions. She recounts receiving calls from men who told her they planned to cut her head off and throw it in the river or instead threatened harm towards her granddaughter. Several times, drivers attempted to run her over. Someone set her house on fire and burnt half her roof.

== Legacy and awards ==
=== Legislation ===
Trimarco's campaign has exposed the sex-trafficking industry and brought the issues of corruption of high officials and the impunity of the human trafficking networks into the public eye. As a result of her efforts, Argentina passed a law that makes the abduction and sexual exploitation of persons a federal offense in 2007. The law also established a Rescue Office to provide legal assistance to victims.

In 2008, Trimarco's efforts led to Argentine legislation that prohibited human trafficking, and led to 3,000 people being rescued from human traffickers in Argentina. In 2011, President Cristina Fernández de Kirchner enacted "Rubro 59", which bans the advertisement of sexual services in newspapers and magazines. For the first time, the Ministry of Security was able to uncover that police forces were implicated in trafficking rings.

In 2008 an anti-trafficking law was passed, and a Rescue Office was established in the Ministry of Justice and Human Rights to oversee the prevention and investigation of human trafficking crimes and provide legal assistance to victims.

=== Awards ===
On March 8, 2007, the U.S. Department of State honored Susana Trimarco with the International Women of Courage Award, conferred by Secretary of State Condoleezza Rice. The official citation reads:

Ms. Susana Trimarco de Veron has faced danger and threats in her efforts to combat human trafficking and to find her daughter, who was kidnapped by traffickers. Desperate to find her missing daughter, Ms. Trimarco put herself in dangerous situations, disguised as a prostitute, trolling bars and alleys in search of anyone who might know her daughter's whereabouts. Despite false leads and death threats, she has uncovered evidence of trafficking networks operating in the Argentine provinces of La Rioja, Tucuman, Buenos Aires, Cordoba, and Santa Cruz. Thanks to Ms. Trimarco's work, human trafficking is now gaining public and government attention in Argentina, and victims are being encouraged to report the crime.

The Argentinian national senate also honored Susana Trimarco with the Premio Domingo Faustino Sarmiento for her work in promotion of human rights.

On March 14, 2012, the Canadian government honored Ms. Trimarco with the John Diefenbaker Defender of Human Rights and Freedom Award.

Trimarco was nominated for the 2013 Nobel Peace Prize.

== Media ==
The Telefé series Vidas Robadas ("Stolen Lives") was inspired by this case.

Susana Trimarco was also the subject of a 2009 documentary, Fragmentos de una Búsqueda (Fragments of a Search), directed by Pablo Milstein and Norberto Ludín.

A season 16 episode of Law & Order: Special Victims Unit, "Undercover Mother," was inspired by Susana's story.

== See also ==
- Human rights in Argentina
- Human trafficking in Argentina
