= Romina Ricci =

Argentine actress

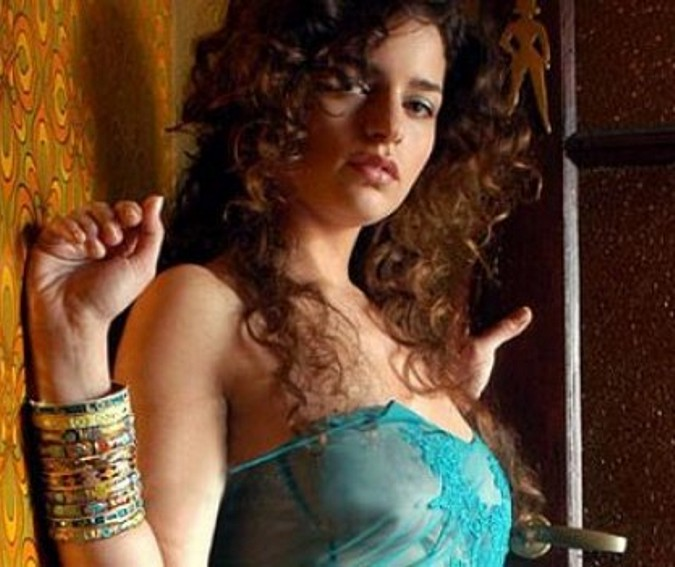
- Born: Romina Sara Ricci; October 15, 1978 (age 47); Buenos Aires, Argentina
- Occupation: Actress

Romina Ricci (Buenos Aires, 15 October 1978) is an Argentine actress, screenwriter and film director.

== Life and career ==
Ricci was born in Flores, and is the youngest of four siblings. When she began Colegio Rawson in Caballito, she enrolled in a theatre course.

She has three daughters: Valentina, daughter of film director Máximo Gutiérrez, Margarita, daughter of musician Fito Páez, and Bethania, daughter of Brazilian music producer Walter Abud.

== Career ==
She began as a child actress at the age of 12 along with Juan Carlos Mesa y Gianni Lunadei in the Telefé comedy series El Gordo y el Flaco (1991). Participated in youth comedies Aprender a volar and Amigovios, and the 90's series Grande Pa! She was part of the cast of La nena (1996) and Naranja y media (1997). Between 1998 and 2000 she played Connie en on the television series Verano del 98.

In the year 2003 joined the cast of the telenovela Resistiré, starring Pablo Echarri and Celeste Cid. She also appeared in the television seriesEl deseo (2004), Doble vida (2005). She starred in five episodes of the show Mujeres asesinas between 2005 and 2008.

In 2008 she joined the cast of the telenovela Vidas robadas, starting Facundo Arana, Soledad Silveyra and Mónica Antonópulos. She then participated on Trátame bien, Herederos de una venganza, Historias de la primera vez, and Historias de diván (2013). She returned to television as the co-star of the miniseries Perfidia, and in 2013 as a part of the series Farsantes, on El Trece.

== Theatre ==
Year	Play
1996	Good Morning Mom
1997	Angles, Devils, Goblins
1997	Theatrical Games
2001	Miss Elsa
2007	Two Surgeons, by Daniel Guebel
2009	Baby you won't steal, by Maruja Bustamante
2010	The anatomist, by Andahazi
2017	Pumpkin Hour, by Ester Feldman
2017	Red Rage: Letraviva by Salvadora Medina Onrubia, by Maruja Bustamante
2018-present	The behavior of the birds of Norman Briski and Vicente Muleiro
2018-2019	Witches

== Filmography ==
Year	Film	Role	Director
2001	Pescado crudo	Romina	Milagros Roque Pitt
2002	Valentín	Carolina	Alejandro Agresti
2003	Hoy y mañana	Claudia	Alejandro Chomski
2007	El resultado del amor	Malena	Eliseo Subiela
2007	¿De quién es el portaligas?	Romi	Fito Páez
2010	Paco	Yamila	Diego Rafecas
2010	Antes	Lorena	Daniel Gimelberg
2012	Rehén de ilusiones	Laura	Eliseo Subiela
2012	Caíto	Sandra	Guillermo Pfening
2013	Amor, etc...	Julia	Gladyz Lizarazu
2013	No somos animales	Rosa "Rosita"	Alejandro Agresti
2013	El esquema de Ponzi	Julieta	Juan Pablo Laplace
2016	Mecánica popular	Silvia	Alejandro Agresti
2017	La soñada	Victoria	Alejo Domínguez
2018	El padre de mis hijos	Laura	Martín Desalvo
2018	El infierno de Lucy	Olga	Daniel Warner
2020	El cuaderno de Tomy	Leticia	Carlos Sorín
2021	La sangre roja	Verónica	Ana Barreto
2021	Las chinas	Teresa "Hoki"	Romina Ricci
2021	Amor bandido	Luciana Santander	Daniel Warner
2022	El espejo de los malditos	Leticia	Ana Katz
2022	Paraíso fácil	Erica	Daniela Maldonado

== Television ==
=== Telenovelas ===
Year	Title	Role	Channel
1991	Grande pá!	Belén	Telefe
1991	El gordo y el flaco	Romina	Telefe
1991	Los Libonatti	Victoria "Vicky" Libonatti	Canal 9
1994	Aprender a volar	Paola	Canal 13
1994	Con alma de tango	Sofía	Canal 9
1995	La hermana mayor	Camila Nievas	Canal 9
1995	Amigovios	María	Canal 13
1996	La Nena	Melina	Canal 9
1997	Son o se hacen	Carolina	Canal 9
1997	Naranja y media	Romina Vázquez	Telefe
1998 - 2000	Verano del '98	Connie / Marilyn Vázquez	Telefe
2002	Franco Buenaventura, el profe	Yamila	Telefe
2003	Resistiré	Rosario Moreno	Telefe
2004	El deseo	Sabrina	Telefe
2005	Doble vida	Violeta	América TV
2008	Vidas robadas	Inés Amaya	Telefe
2011	Herederos de una venganza	Eva Ochoa	El Trece
2013	Farsantes	Nancy Pombo de Graziani	El Trece

=== Series ===
Year	Title	Role	Notes	Channel
2005	Mujeres asesinas	Carmen	Epi. 21: "Carmen, hija"	Canal 13
2006	Mujeres asesinas 2	Cecilia	Epi. 16: "Cecilia, hermana"	Canal 13
2006	Mujeres asesinas 2	Andrea	Epi. 19: "Andrea, bailantera"	Canal 13
2006	Al límite	Pía	Epi. 13: "El calvario"	Telefe
2007	Mujeres asesinas 3	Sandra	Epi. 6: "Claudia, herida"	Canal 13
2008	Mujeres asesinas 4	Dolores	Epi. 1: "Dolores, poseída"	Canal 13
2008	Variaciones	Mariana	Epi. 6: "Estrella"	TV Pública
2011	Historias de la primera vez	Elena	Epi. 12: "La primera vez embarazados"	América TV
2012	Perfidia	Julieta Mitre	Co-protagonista	TV Pública
2013	Historias de diván	Debora	Epi. 25: "Juegos de seducción"	Telefe
2015	Conflictos modernos	María	Epi. 5: "María y María"	Canal 9
2016	La última hora	Sonia Lalina	Co-protagonista	TV Pública
2016	La pulsera	Mariana Lynch	Protagonista	HBO
2018	Pasado de copas: Dunk History	Julieta Lanteri	Epi. 4: "La historia del voto femenino"	Telefe
2019	Tu parte del trato	Irma	Participación	El Trece
2021	Maradona, sueño bendito	Mónica Bang	Participación	Prime Video
2021	Abejas, el arte del engaño	Rosario "Charo" Blanco	Epi. 8: "El halcón de oro"	Flow
2022	Dos 20	Jimena	Epi. 3: "Principio de placer"	TV Pública

=== Reality show ===
Year	Program	Role	Notes	Channel
2021	Showmatch: The Academy	Participant	Lost	El Trece

== Awards ==
Nominations

- Silver Condor Award: Best Female Revelation (Whose is the garter belt?)
- Carlos Award: Best Female Actress(Witches)
