= Mabel Manzotti =

Argentine actress

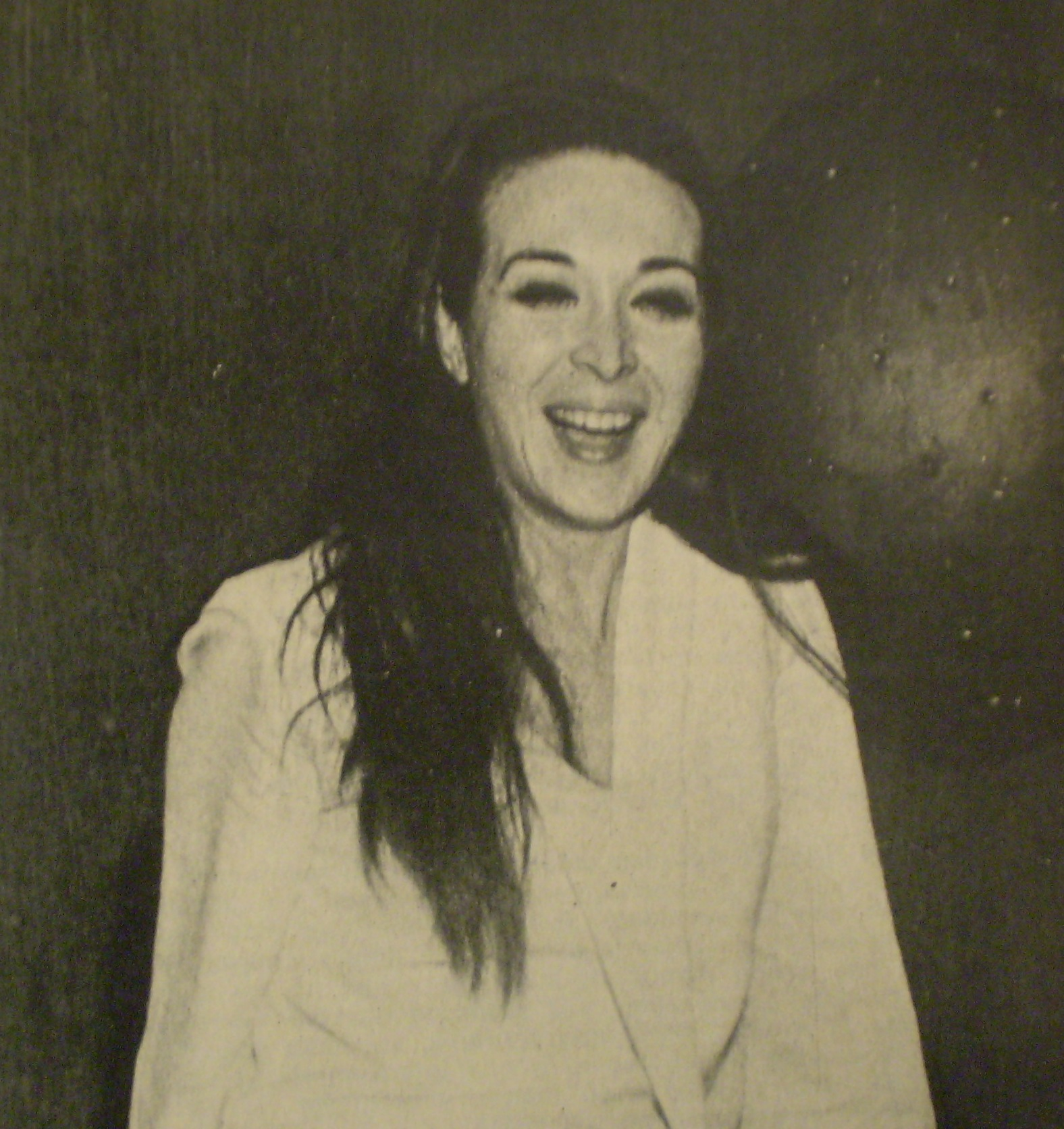
Mabel Gladys Manzotti (1938-2012)

Mabel Gladys Manzotti (July 28, 1938 – January 25, 2012) was an Argentine film, stage and television actress. Her film credits included Besos en la Frente, while her telenovela credits included roles in Vidas robadas. She played Bochita in the 1960s Argentine television series, El botón, opposite Jorge Porcel and Alberto Olmedo.

In 1959, Manzotti was cast in the film, El farsante más grande del mundo, which co-starred Osvaldo Bonet and Alfredo Alcón. She later joined the Teatro Maipo in Buenos Aires. Manzotti's last television role was in 2008, when she appeared opposite Facundo Arana in the Telefe telenovela, Vidas robadas, in 2008.

Mabel Manzotti suffered a stroke in early 2011. She died in Buenos Aires on January 25, 2012, at the age of 73.
