= Resistiré (Argentine TV series) =

- Genre: Telenovela, Drama, Mystery, Romance, Crime, Suspense, Thriller
- Created by: Gustavo Belatti; Mario Segade
- Starring: see below
- Opening theme: "Resistiré" - David Bolzoni
- Country of origin: Argentina
- Original language: Spanish
- No. of episodes: 220

Production
- Running time: 60 minutes

Original release
- Network: Telefe
- Release: January 13 – December 9, 2003

Related
- Franco Buenaventura, el Profe; El Deseo

Resistiré (International Title: Forever Julia) is a 2003 Argentine telenovela. This serial features a gorgeous woman torn between her terrorist fiancé and a handsome tailor. It starred Pablo Echarri, Celeste Cid, Carolina Fal and Fabián Vena.

Resistiré was a major hit on Argentine television. It dared to introduce new elements in the genre of telenovela and was well accepted by the audience, setting a new standard in TV. In 2004, the telenovela won the Martín Fierro Award as the best show of the year, along with many other awards. In 2007, Portuguese remake debuted. SIC produced a Portuguese version titled Resistirei.

In 2006, two remakes debuted. MyNetworkTV produced an American version in English titled Watch Over Me. In addition, Televisa unveiled Amar sin límites (Love Without Limits) for Mexican viewers.

== Plot ==
Diego Moreno is a 30-year-old tailor who has worked for several years in a men's clothing shop. Down on his luck, having recently broken up with his fiancée who also embezzled from him, he has temporarily moved back in with his parents. However, he is not as welcome as he expected. Therefore, all of his loving is devoted to his family, and to his childhood friends Ferchu and Paco. Shortly after he goes back to his parents’ house, Diego meets Julia Malaguer Podestá, with whom he falls in love. Julia, however, is engaged to Mauricio Doval, a successful businessman who hides his bloody business affairs behind his zealous defence of organic and natural products. Diego and Julia have a brief encounter; yet, due to various circumstances, they part company expecting to never meet again.

Diego becomes a very close friend of Martina Mansur, a woman who lost her small son two years earlier and believes that Mauricio is somehow to blame for the death. Martina finds no comfort assuages her pain and makes up her mind to kill Mauricio. Diego finds out about her plans and, in order to prevent her from committing a crime, ends up saving Mauricio’s life.

Mauricio then wants Diego to work for him, almost as if he were a lucky charm, and he does not stop until he accomplishes his objective. When Diego accepts and visits his new employer he discovers that Julia is Mauricio's wife. Initially Diego is unaware of Mauricio’s true background; however, little by little, he learns of Mauricio’s deadly business. Although, by then, knowing this will become too much of a burden for him. And when he feels like leaving the place, he will realize this is not possible. At least, it will not be possible for him to leave alive.

Besides, Diego will not dare to leave Julia by herself in the midst of the danger she still is unable to see. Julia does not know who Mauricio truly is, and she arranged for her father, the well-known scientist Alfredo Malaguer, to work with him. Mauricio needs his scientific knowledge in order to carry out ambitious and dirty plans and had been after Malaguer even before meeting Julia. Diego will find himself facing a dilemma: whether to compromise with the truth and take advantage of it, or else to fight as if from within hell itself in order to change it.

== Cast ==
- Pablo Echarri as Diego Moreno
- Celeste Cid as Julia Malaguer Podesta
- Fabián Vena as Mauricio Doval
- Carolina Fal as Martina Mansur
- Claudia Lapaco as Eladia Moreno
- Hugo Arana as Ricardo Moreno
- Romina Ricci as Rosario Moreno
- Daniel Fanego as Alfredo Malaguer
- Alejandra Flechner as Adela
- Andrea Politti as Inés
- Leonor Manso as Gloria Provenzano
- Zulma Faiad as Pampa
- Daniel Kuzniecka as Santiago Romero
- Mariana Briski as Cristina
- Rafael Ferro as Fernando "Ferchu" León
- Pacho Guerty as Paco
- Malena Luchetti as Carolina Doval
- Claudio Quinteros as Andrés Pagnini
- Tina Serrano as Leonarda
- Sebastian Pajoni as Luis Pedro "Lupe" Malaguer
- Enrique Liporace as Anibal
- Barbara Lombardo as Vanina
- Guido Gorgatti as Arturo
- Martín Slipak as César
- Carlos Kaspar as Pascual "Beby" Tagliaterri
- Pablo Rago as Leandro Dalman
- María Leal as Claudia
- Fabio Di Tomaso as Javier
- Ana Celentano as Mabel

== See also ==
- Amar sin límites
- Watch Over Me
- Resistirei

=== International releases ===
Country	Local title	TV Network(s)	Airdate
Argentina	Resistiré	Telefe	January 13, 2003 - December 9, 2003
Serbia	Jaчa oд cyдбинe	PTC 1, РТС 2, 3K	April 7, 2004 - April 17, 2006
Greece	Αντίσταση	ANT1	April 7, 2005 - June 3, 2007
