= Human trafficking in Argentina =

Human trafficking in Argentina is the illegal trade in persons for purposes of reproductive slavery, sexual exploitation, forced labor, organ removal, or any form of modern slavery.

It is an international crime against humanity and violates human rights. It is considered a modern form of slavery. Worldwide it is ranked third among felony crimes, behind arms and drugs trafficking. It accounts for the movement of more than $32 billion worldwide. A United Nations international protocol against human trafficking has been signed by 117 different countries, among them Argentina. This treaty obligates the countries that are party to it to prevent and combat human trafficking and to assist and protect the victims of it. It also encourages countries to cooperate among themselves to achieve these objectives.

In Argentina this crime is punishable by law. There are many laws that cover this problem, but the crime continues to occur. An important legal development in this area was the enactment of law number 26.364, which tries to achieve what this international protocol seeks and provides penalties of 3 to 15 years in prison.

Despite being a serious felony, in Argentina there are no official statistics on this crime, only for cases prosecuted. But it is known that the country is a source, transit and destination for trafficking. As a means of preventing trafficking, in July 2011 the government issued an order that banned the publication of explicit advertisements of sexual solicitation in the newspapers.

A study from 2012 showed that trafficking for sexual exploitation is changing to evade the law, by allowing exploited women to keep their identification documents or allowing them to leave the location of exploitation, to make the trafficking more difficult to prove.

U.S. State Department's Office to Monitor and Combat Trafficking in Persons placed the country in "Tier 1" in 2018 and 2023.

In 2023, the Organised Crime Index gave the country a score of 5 out of 10 for human trafficking.

== Basic elements of trafficking ==
1. "Recruitment"; this can be by deception or by force, and involves a recruiter.
2. "Transport"; from here to the site of exploitation, the victim is subjected to coercion. Transfer may be between regions or other countries. Colluding in this process are transporters, corrupt officials, and intermediaries to the trafficking.
3. The "operation"; here the victim is subjected to exploitation by the pimp or the operator, who takes a totally illegal right of property over the victim.

== Federal legislation ==
There are many laws that touch on the theme of trafficking; historically the Ley Palacios of 1913 was the first law in the protection to protect victims of sexual exploitation and slavery, as well as to punish those responsible. It was the first legislation in the entire American continent and signified a great advance in human rights in the country. The International Day Against Human Trafficking commemorates the enactment of this law.

Argentina, as a signatory to the United Nations Protocol to Prevent, Suppress and Punish Trafficking in Persons, especially Women and Children, on April 29, 2008 passed Law 26.364 for the Prevention and Punishment of Trafficking in Persons and Assistance to its Victims. According to the dictates of international protocol and emphasizing care and rights of victims and differentiating between adults and minors. It is in accordance with the codes of international protocol and places emphasis on assistance and rights of victims and their differentiation between adults and minors.

- Law 26.364 defines trafficking as:

La captación, el transporte y/o traslado — ya sea dentro del país, desde o hacia el exterior—, la acogida o la recepción de personas mayores de dieciocho (18) años de edad, con fines de explotación, cuando mediare engaño, fraude, violencia, amenaza o cualquier medio de intimidación o coerción, abuso de autoridad o de una situación de vulnerabilidad, concesión o recepción de pagos o beneficios para obtener el consentimiento de una persona que tenga autoridad sobre la víctima, aún cuando existiere asentimiento de ésta.

— Tratándose de adultos.

[Translation: The recruitment, transportation and / or moving — whether it is within the country or to or from the exterior, harboring or receipt of persons over the age of eighteen (18) years of age, for the purpose of exploitation, when deception, fraud, violence, threat, or any form of intimidation or coercion, abuse of authority or of a position of vulnerability, giving or receiving of payments or benefits to achieve the consent of a person having control over the victim, even when there is consent of the victim.

— In the case of adults.]

Se entiende por trata de menores el ofrecimiento, la captación, el transporte y/o traslado —ya sea dentro del país, desde o hacia el exterior—, la acogida o la recepción de personas menores de dieciocho (18) años de edad, con fines de explotación. Existe trata de menores aún cuando no mediare engaño, fraude, violencia, amenaza o cualquier medio de intimidación o coerción, abuso de autoridad o de una situación de vulnerabilidad, concesión o recepción de pagos o beneficios para obtener el consentimiento de una persona que tenga autoridad sobre la víctima. El asentimiento de la víctima de trata de personas menores de dieciocho (18) años no tendrá efecto alguno.

— En caso de menores.

[Translation: It is meant by trafficking in minors the recruitment, transportation and / or transfer, whether within the country or to and from abroad—, harboring or receipt of persons under eighteen (18) years of age, with the purpose of exploitation. Trafficking of minors exists even when there is no medium of deception, fraud, violence, threat, or any form of intimidation or coercion, abuse of authority or of a position of vulnerability, giving or receiving of payments or benefits to achieve the consent of a person having control on the victim. The consent of a victim of trafficking in persons under eighteen (18) years shall have no effect.

— In the case of minors.]

- Victims can not be punished for committing any offense that is a direct result of being trafficked. In the case of foreigners, no sanctions are applied nor can their contracts be voided because of infractions of immigration legislation if the violations are due trafficking.
- This law sets criminal and procedural rules, with penalties of 3–6 years in the case of trafficking of adults and 4 to 10 years if there are aggravating circumstances such as:
1. The person who commits the crime is parent or grandparent, spouse, related in a direct line, brother, guardian, person living, tutor, in charge of education or a caretaker, minister of any religion recognized or not, or public official;
2. The act was committed by three or more people in an organized manner;
3. There were three or more victims.

== Victims ==
Trafficking generates victims who in the majority of cases live under inhuman conditions; to be a victim of trafficking involves slavery, in which the trafficker gains a totally illegal right of property right over the victim or reduces her to the level of indentured servitude for the purpose of economic exploitation. In Argentina the most common victims of forced labor are in underground sweatshops are textile or as farm laborers and in other cases domestic workers. As for sexual exploitation that principally affects women, adolescents, and children, they are mostly found in the country's brothels.

=== Forced labor ===
Forced labor includes a variety of trades, but the sectors most affected are rural and textile labor.

==== Textile industry ====
According to the National Institute of Statistics and Censuses (INDEC – Instituto Nacional de Estadística y Censos), unregistered labor in the apparel industry approaches 75%. According to Gustavo Vera, president of the cooperative La Alameda (which represents and defends textile workers), "We know that there are about 3,000 underground sweatshops in the Capital Federal" and he adds "There are also some 15,000 underground sweatshops in the first tier of the Buenos Aires suburbs and several thousand more in Greater Buenos Aires, Rosario, Mendoza and Córdoba. These workshops include a population of about 200,000 people who are reduced to forced labor or slave labor, which is the same as forced labor but worse, because the will of the workers is controlled 24 hours a day by the employer."

According to the Bureau of International Labor Affairs, Argentina is classified among the 74 countries in which child labor and forced labor is still practiced today. The Bureau's List of Goods Produced by Child Labor or Forced Labor mentions "garments" as one of 11 other products in Argentina. Furthermore, in one of its reports on the worst forms of child labor, The U.S. Department of Labor states that "Argentina has not adopted a list of hazardous occupations that are prohibited to children, and appears to lack programs that target working children in all relevant sectors."

==== Rural ====
In Argentina, one of the first protections of the farm laborer was born in 1940 with the enactment of the Estatuto del Peón [Statute of farm laborers] which gave wage laborers (jornaleros) all the rights of workers (trabajadores). Later, complementary laws were added. The government of Cristina Kirchner signed the conventions of the International Labour Organization (ILO) prohibiting the forced recruitment of manual labor for the rural labor force. However, there still exist recruiting networks that through deception or physical coercion recruit people who are typically in a vulnerable situation. And they are recruited from marginal rural areas of Santiago del Estero, Chaco, Tucumán, Catamarca and Jujuy and from migrant workers from bordering countries such as Chile, Bolivia, and Paraguay. And then they are taken to areas where they do hard labor and live in subhuman conditions. These situations violate the Protocol of San Salvador treaty and International Labour Conference Convention 184.

=== Sexual abuse ===
==== History ====
Sexual exploitation was born in the Viceroyalty of the Río de la Plata before the country was even created. After independence in 1875, a law was made regulating prostitution, preventing prostitution of minors, but allowing it if the children were initiated early into this activity.

In the late nineteenth century, "European slavery" rings were established that provided Jewish women from Central Europe and Russia, who were sold in a sham marriage to a ruffian. They sought to escape poverty and antisemitism that they suffered. And in this country, they were forced into prostitution or sold to another pimp. In the early twentieth century, these trafficking organizations tightened their ties with power. This was in order to be protected by law or to avoid problems in case of breaking laws or deception. Because of their great accumulation of wealth through "kickbacks", they accomplished their mission. Among the customers it is possible to highlight periods of intense European migration that brought primarily single men as main consumers of trafficking, although upper-middle class Argentinians also had a high level use of prostitution. By the early twentieth century, there was one major international trafficking ring: La Migdal, or Zwi Migdal, of Jewish origin, formerly called the Warsaw Jewish Mutual Aid Society. The ring came to an end in 1929 when Raquel Liberman, one of thousands of Polish immigrants enslaved in brothels, reported the organization to the authorities. The complaint was taken by a judge, Manuel Rodríguez Ocampo. Especially since another 150 previous complaints were not successful either because of violence against the accusers or police and judicial corruption. This trial against the organization made it possible to make public the treatment suffered by the victims.

After several periods of closure and opening of brothels, from June 24, 1965, Law 16.666 was put into effect that the practice of prostitution is open and not subject to any form of regulation. This law is in effect to the present day.

In practice, this criminal activity is organized on a grand scale and is frequently associated with the illegal drug trade and with arms trafficking. Much of this crime is organized on a global level.

==== Current status ====
At present, Argentina is a source, transit, and destination location for trafficking, which means that the victims can be Argentinian or from other countries, that they go through this country, and that some have this as the destination to be illegally exploited.

"Reclutadores" (recruiters) capture the victims through deception or abduction, assisted by "marcadores" (markers) who pick the victims. Then the circle closes with the "proxenetas" (pimps) who get their profit from the sexual exploitation of victims. And finally the "regentes" (managers) or madames of brothels. There are also carriers and secondary dealers concerned with protecting this whole criminal system. In some cases there is some kind of collusion between members of the police, judges, and politicians.

The province of the country in which the most women are recruited is Entre Ríos, followed by Misiones, Corrientes, Chaco, Santa Fe and Tucumán; usually victims are rotated through brothels across the whole country. The list of destinations includes Buenos Aires and Cordoba, at the head of the list of destinations chosen by the rings, along with La Pampa, Chubut, Santa Cruz and Tierra del Fuego. There are also links to international rings, especially the route to Spain, where young Tucuman women were rescued.

==== Recruitment ====
There are many recruiting methods but all are either "soft", based on fraud and deception, or "hard", based directly on kidnapping the victims.

- Kidnapping: in this crime women are identified and marked. Later they are kidnapped from off the street, they are drugged and transported to a place where they are repeatedly violated for the purpose of sexually exploiting them later. Those who offer resistance are threatened with harming or killing her family.
- Deception: in which recruiters take advantage of the poverty or defenselessness of the victim with false offers of employment, moving the victim to another province or country, after which she finds she is to be sexually exploited.

There are also cases in which the victim has agreed to work in the sex trade, but then finds out the working and living conditions fall within the category of trafficking. Sometimes these victims only recognize the exploitation after intensive psychological assistance.

==== Studies ====
A study in 2012 of court cases of the Unidad Fiscal de Asistencia en Secuestros Extorsivos y Trata de Personas [Fiscal Unit of Assistance in Kidnappings and Trafficking in Persons](UFASE) and the Instituto de Estudios Comparados en Ciencias Penales y Sociales [Institute for Comparative Studies in Criminal and Social Sciences] (INECIP) revealed that trafficking for sexual exploitation is mutating into new forms of subjugation of women, to make it more difficult to prove the existence of slavery in bordellos and thus evading the law. This is a result of the enactment of Law 26.364 in April 2008 that strongly penalizes this offense. The victims have their documents in their possession and in many cases are allowed to leave the sites of exploitation, but the subjugation continues to function in another way. Furthermore, the report shows collusion between state, local, police, and judicial entities that "legitimizes the activity and leads to its habituation." Some 72% of cases are enslaved in nightclubs like whiskerías (undercover brothels), pubs, or pool halls, all enabled by the municipalities, and the other 22% in private apartments.

=== Underage victims ===
Worldwide, close to 2.5 million people are victims of some form of trafficking. Between 22% and 50% are girls and boys. The exact figure is unknown because trafficking in children is usually hidden; for this reason, reliable data cannot be obtained. Many of these situations occur within cities or urban areas. For example, trafficking for the purposes of sexual exploitation occurs with girls and boys working on city streets. Many rural children from rural areas are moved to the cities by the traffickers.

According to the Department of State of the United States, that which occurs in the world also occurs in Argentina. Children come from northern provinces, or from bordering countries like Bolivia, Paraguay, and Brazil. Areas with a triple border are a major focus of child trafficking and child labor, especially of children living in border areas and bordering countries. These end up in urban centers of central and south of the country, where child sex tourism is promoted. Others are victims of forced labor in underground sweatshops and agricultural enterprises.

Under the new Argentine law, child trafficking is punishable by the maximum penalty for this offense. In addition, penalties can be increased if there are aggravating factors.

=== Interviews about trafficking ===
Narrative on trafficking for sexual exploitation:

“Me ofrecieron empleo en un restaurante en la capital, a casi 400 km de mi casa. Como en mi pueblo no había trabajo, acepté. Me adelantaron $200 y me dieron el pasaje en ómnibus. Cuando llegué a la dirección que me habían dado, me dijeron que el restaurante era a unas cuadras, y me llevaron en auto. Pero cuando llegamos, no era una parrilla: era una whiskería. Me encerraron, me pegaron, me violaron y me obligaron a prostituirme. Además, me dijeron que si le decía algo a alguien, esto mismo se lo harían a mis hijas, ya que sabían dónde vivían... Nunca pensé que me pudiera pasar una cosa así…”

[Translation: "I was offered employment in a restaurant in the capital, nearly 400 km from my house. As in my village there was no work, I accepted. They gave me an advance of $200 and bus fare. When I arrived at the address they had given me, I was told that the restaurant was a few blocks away, and brought me there by car. But when we arrived, it was not a grill: it was a whiskería (undercover brothel). They locked me up, beat me, raped me and forced me into prostitution. In addition, I was told that if I said anything to anyone, they would do the same thing to my daughters, since they knew where they lived ... I never would have thought that such a thing could happen to me ... "]

— Source: Organización Internacional para las Migraciones [International Organization for Migration]

Narrative of labor exploitation:

“Un día por la radio escuché que un fabricante pedía costureros para su taller en Buenos Aires. En Santa Cruz (Bolivia), me entrevisté con una señora que me dijo que pagaban un peso con cincuenta la prenda, con casa y comida. Ellos pagaban el traslado, y después me lo iban descontando. Mi pasaje salió 120 dólares. Viajamos mi mujer, yo, y unas seis personas más. De la terminal de micros de Retiro nos llevaron directo al taller, y el dueño se quedó con nuestros documentos. El taller tiene dos habitaciones bien grandes, con unas 15 máquinas. Allí trabajamos, comemos y vivimos todos, incluso hay gente con niños pequeños. Trabajamos de lunes a sábado al mediodía, desde las siete de la mañana hasta la una de la madrugada del día siguiente. Al que se cansa o quiere dormir, el dueño lo amenaza con no pagarle nada, con “cagarlo a palos por vago”, o con denunciarlo a la policía para que lo deporten. Las puertas del taller están cerradas con llave, y la puerta de calle también. Ayer cuando le pedí lo que me debía, porque quería mandar plata a mi familia, me dijo que no me debía nada, me gritó que si lo seguía jodiendo llamaba a los de migraciones y me agarró a las patadas; a mi señora también le pegó.”

[Translation: "One day I heard on the radio that a manufacturer was asking for sewing workers for their workshop in Buenos Aires. In Santa Cruz (Bolivia), I interviewed with a woman who told me they were paying one peso per fifty garments, with room and board. They would pay for the transportation and later give me a discount. My passage turned out to be $120. We traveled together: my wife, myself, and some six people more. From Retiro, the main terminal for long-distance bus travel in Buenos Aires, they took us straight to the shop and the owner kept our documents. The workshop has two rather large rooms, with about 15 machines. That was where we all worked, ate, and lived, including even people with small children. We worked from Monday to Saturday at noon, from seven o'clock in the morning until one o'clock in the morning of the next day. If anyone gets tired or wants to sleep, the owner threatens to not pay us anything, to "beat the crap out of us for being lazy," or to denounce us to the police so they would deport us. The shop doors are locked and the door to the street as well. Yesterday when I asked what he owed me, because I wanted to send money to my family, he told me he didn't owe me anything, he shouted at me that if I kept screwing around he would call immigration and he grabbed me kicking, he also hit my wife."]

— Source: Organización Internacional para las Migraciones [International Organization for Migration]

== Court cases ==
=== Case of Marita Verón ===
One of the more well known cases in Argentina is that of Marita Verón, which was brought to court in 2012 after an intensive search and collection of evidence, where part of the network of this country's web of trafficking for sexual exploitation was discovered.

It is known that she left her home on April 3, 2002, and three days later, she was found by police while escaping from a sex party that seems to have been her first destination; she was put on a bus with a group traveling in the direction of Tucuman but never arrived. Later, a witness saw her in one of three Rioja brothels, which the Appeals Chamber of Tucumán described as "places intended for the practice of prostitution where there is a systematic recruitment of women including by means deprivation of liberty." Since then there has been no more information obtained on the whereabouts of Marita.

Marita's mother Susana Trimarco, the principal impulse behind the investigation, has managed to rescue more than 20 women who were victims of trafficking. The Maria de los Angeles Foundation rescues and helps victims of trafficking.

The trial over the disappearance of Marita began on February 8, 2012, and indicted 13 people, 7 men and 6 women, who are linked to the kidnapping and to the promotion of prostitution. It brought together more than 150 witnesses. The trial ended on December 11, 2012, and all indicted people were absolved, the mother of Marita Verón will impulse a political trial against the magistrate.

=== UFASE's statistics ===
According to statistics taken from August 22, 2008, to March 7, 2012, by the Fiscal Assistance Unit of Kidnappings and Trafficking (UFASE – Unidad Fiscal de Asistencia en Secuestros Extorsivos y Trata de Personas) responsible for assisting the Argentine fiscal units in the processing of kidnappings and trafficking court cases. Some 64% of court cases were for trafficking for purposes of sexual exploitation, while the percentages for trafficking for labor exploitation were 5% rural, 1% textile, and 1% begging. As for sexual exploitation, 77% of the victims were female, 19% male, and 4% transgender. In 70% of cases, the method of recruitment was by "promises of employment", 8% by exploiting the victim's family problems and 8% inducement by romantic relationship, and 3% of cases by the delivery by a family member or acquaintance. Some 52% had no freedom of movement and 45% experienced violence. With regard to the nationality of the victims, 31% were Bolivian, 28% Argentinian, 21% Paraguayan, 10% Dominican, 5% Peruvian, 3% Colombian, and 2% Uruguayan. Source countries for recruitment were 83% in Argentina, 12% in Paraguay, and 1% in Bolivia, while the destination country was 94% for Argentina, 4% Paraguay, and 2% Chile.

== Support programs for victims and others ==
=== Office for Rescue and Caring of Victims of Trafficking ===
According to the new Law 26.364 that was created in August 2008, the "Oficina de Rescate y Acompañamiento a Personas Damnificadas por el Delito de Trata de Personas [Office of Rescue and Support for People Harmed by the Crime of Trafficking in Persons]", is under the Chief of Staff of the Ministry of Justice Office. The security forces, professionals in psychology, law, and social work have a similar form. They accompany the victim from the time of their rescue or escape from the place of exploitation and during the investigation of the trafficking crime, later providing support and legal assistance until the moment they give testimony. Victims receive psychological, medical, and legal assistance. Later, the victims "testify under conditions of special protection and care"; this can be via a Gesell chamber or one-way mirror.

Victims are "not punishable for committing any offense that is a direct result of being trafficked." In the case of foreigners, no sanctions are applied either.

=== Maria de los Angeles Foundation ===
Fundación María de los Ángeles [Foundation of Maria of the Angels] is a nonprofit organization that fights against the crime of human trafficking for the purposes of sexual exploitation. The foundation assists victims of sexual exploitation free of charge, and offers legal assistance to victims, counseling for victims and families, and social assistance. It also provides community talks and capacity building for judges, prosecutors, and police.

It seeks to prosecute applicable cases under Law 26.364 and to provide psychological support to victims so they can overcome the traumatic situations they have lived through.

The foundation was founded by Susana Trimarco in 2007 with the help of the Human Rights Secretariat of Tucuman. Since then this group has achieved the filing of more than 800 court cases, and has found and rescued at least 400 women subjected to sex trafficking without their consent.

Susana Trimarco is still searching for her daughter Marita, who fell victim to sex trafficking on April 3, 2002. After investigating the crime of trafficking and its networks, and rescuing many victims, including some under 12 years of age, she decided to create the foundation to help victims and to continue searching for her daughter. The vision of the foundation is to eradicate the trafficking of persons in Argentina.

The María de los Ángeles foundation has offices based in Tucuman and Buenos Aires . The foundation and Susana Trimarco can count many accomplishments and awards.

== See also ==
- 2025 livestreamed murder in Argentina
