= Disappearance of Marita Verón =

Argentinean disappearance case

Marita Verón
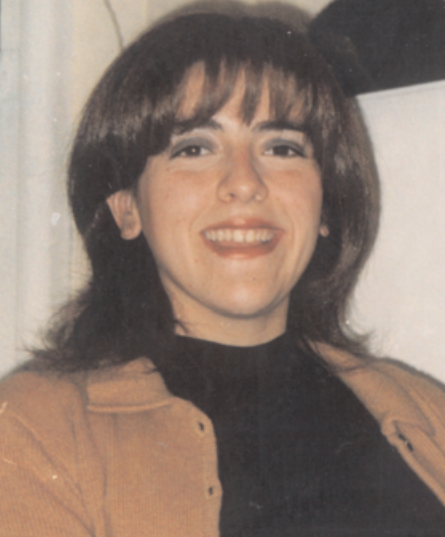
- Verón in 1990s
- Born: María de los Angeles Verón
- Disappeared: April 3, 2002 (aged 23); Tucumán Province
- Status: Missing for 24 years, 7 months and 19 days
- Children: 1
- Parents: Daniel Verón (father); Susana Trimarco (mother)

María de los Angeles Verón (known as Marita Verón) was 23 when she disappeared on April 3, 2002. Maria was kidnapped on her way to a doctor's appointment in a northern Argentina city and never returned home. She has still not been found. Evidence suggests that she was kidnapped by human traffickers in order to force her into prostitution, and may have been forcibly transported to either La Rioja Province, Argentina or Spain.

Her mother, Susana Trimarco, has run a tireless search to find her daughter. Her search has led to more than 3,000 women who were victims of trafficking. The Maria de los Angeles Foundation rescues and helps victims of trafficking. For example, the foundation played a vital role in bringing Alika Kinan's case to court. Because of this, over the years Verón's case has become a symbol of the fight against human trafficking in Argentina and most of South America.

== Disappearance ==
Marita Verón had left the home of her mother on April 3, 2002, to keep a doctor's appointment, when, according to the description of a witness, she was kidnapped by people who got out of a red car. Three days later she was found by police in the area of La Ramada, over 30 kilometers away, wearing shoes with heels instead of the sneakers she had been wearing when she disappeared. It appeared that she had escaped from a sex party. Police left her on a bus that was headed to Tucumán, but she never reached her destination.

"April 3, 2002 was the saddest day of my life. I will never forget that day, as it was when my daughter's life was destroyed," Trimarco told the BBC. She and her husband Daniel, who died in 2010, asked at hospitals, and spoke to police and neighbours about Verón. No-one knew her whereabouts. Trimarco recounted, "We walked back and forth to hospitals, streets; we talked with her girlfriends. Nothing. I was desperate. At the police station, they didn't want to take our report; they said she had gone voluntarily with a boyfriend or with her girlfriends. Then they said they had no paper to take down a report, or gas to go out and look for her in a car."

A number of days later a witness came forward and reported seeing Verón being pushed into a red car by three men. Three weeks later a prostitute told her parents that she had been 'sold' to traffickers.

== Search ==
With little support from the police, Verón's parents conducted their own investigation, which soon led to enough evidence to allow the police to raid a number of suspected brothels where her daughter could have been being held. The suspected brothels, in La Rioja, called themselves cabarets or whiskey bars (whiskerías) and have since been called "places for the practice of prostitution where there is systematic recruitment of women, including by means of depriving them of liberty." The investigation identified three La Rioja whiskerías, "Candy," "El Candilejas" (The Limelight), and "El Desafío" (The Challenge), as fronts for prostitution.

One of the women freed during this raid reported seeing Verón in "Candy" with dyed hair and blue contact lenses, but that she had been removed shortly before the raid. Armed with this information, Verón's mother began infiltrating human-trafficking gangs by pretending to be interested in "buying" women. The information she gathered from these visits led to police raids which rescued dozens of women who were being sexually exploited.

The search was given another lead when the alleged madam of "Candy", Lidia Medina, was heard to say, "Those fools are looking for her, and she's in Spain." Medina is currently under arrest for "unlawful deprivation of liberty and aggravated promotion of prostitution", along with her son and his wife.

== Investigation ==
Other branches of the investigation incriminated Daniela Milhein from Tucumán, who had intended to transport Verón to Rio Gallegos. She was detained along with her husband and a La Rioja Province official who was transporting women. The raids have led to a series of women being released. This includes a woman from the province of Misiones, one from the province of Córdoba, and two from the province of Buenos Aires. Further information was obtained about the prostitution ring in Spain from which 17 women were rescued, but Verón was not found among them.

On February 8, 2012, thirteen people accused of kidnapping Verón and selling her to traffickers who forced her into prostitution went on trial in a court in Tucumán.

== The trial ==
In February, 13 people (7 men and 6 women) charged with kidnapping Verón and promoting prostitution went on trial in a court in the city of San Miguel de Tucumán. The three-month-long trial heard more than 130 witnesses, including Trimarco and a dozen women rescued from brothels by her. On December 12, 2012, the three judges found the defendants not guilty, saying that there was no evidence linking the defendants to Marita Verón.

On February 16, the sixth day of the trial and the second day of her statement to the court, she told the story of her ten-year search for Verón. Confronting defendants, politicians, and police, Verón's mother related how she discovered the business of human trafficking, and declared that the only thing she looks for is the return of her daughter.

Trimarco dedicated the first part of her statement to talking about her family. She remembered her husband, Daniel Verón, who died in 2010, the early childhood years of their children Horace and Marita, the courtship of the latter with David Catalan, and the birth of Micaela, her granddaughter.

Trimarco described what happened the day Verón disappeared. Her suspicions fell on Patricia Soria, a nurse who lived in the same neighborhood as Verón, in Las Talitas. "Marita wanted to get an IUD (a birth control device) and she insisted that Marita go to Maternidad (the maternity center). Trimarco stated that the nurse had told Marita that her boyfriend was the chief of personnel at a local maternity hospital. She could introduce the two and thereby save her the cost of a private facility. Trimarco remarked that she did not like this woman at all, since she asked Marita so many details of her private life and of her family. She quoted "I had a bad feeling about her from the beginning". After Marita next saw her mother after booking the appointment she recounted a very macabre picture. Once she got to the hospital, Marita discovered that the man she had been introduced to wasn't the chief of personnel, but was actually a janitor. At the hospital she said she had seen a police alert with a picture of the nurse alleging that the woman was a suspect in a case of infant theft. Marita told her mother not to worry "I won't have anything to do with the nurse anymore." Nonetheless she decided to proceed with getting the IUD at the maternity ward. She had an appointment scheduled for 9:30am of the following day.

Then she testified against Miguel Ardiles, a supposed employee of Maternidad who helped Verón get an appointment. "They called her at 3 to give her the appointment and they asked her to bring her document". This document was her identity card, the Documento Nacional de Identidad (DNI), which is required for hospital admissions, to carry out banking procedures, and as travel documentation. Trimarco remarked, "This looked unusual to us."

On recounting the initial search when Verón did not return from Maternidad she said "We walked back and forth to hospitals, streets; we talked with her girlfriends. Nothing. I was desperate. At the police station, they didn't want to take our report; they said she had gone voluntarily with a boyfriend or with her girlfriends. Then they said they had no paper to take down a report, or gas to go out and look for her in a car."

Chief Justice Alberto Piedra interrupted at this point in the story, and declared a recess. "Yes, because I have a lot left. I need about 10 days," said Trimarco.

When the court resumed, Verón's mother spoke of the search. She spared no words against the former governor Julio Miranda and officials of his cabinet. "Like a stupid person I went to the Governor's Mansion. I say stupid because the mafia was there. They sent me to talk to Ale," she said.

Trimarco referred to an agreement signed by the government (Miranda's order) with the Association of United Remiseros of Tucumán (ARUT), in which they were declared custodians of the city. "Julio Díaz (Secretary of Security) told me they had more cars and better weapons than the police," she said. (Remiseros are minicabs – taxis that have no external markings and can only be booked in advance by telephone or at a remisería – the taxi office.)

When she had to make reference to María Jesús Rivero, the head of ARUT and the Cinco Estrellas (Five Stars) remisería company, she spoke of her as "that woman". And as expected, she testified against Ruben "la Chancha" (the pig) Ale. "I never had any confidence in them, because everyone said that they were criminals," she said.

"'La Chancha' Ale and the mafia handle all the drugs and prostitution in this province. I don't know why the people of Tucumán don't stand up to them. I'm going to stand up to them, short and small as I am; I'm going to defend my daughter," she assured them. There were three moments of tension because of reactions by the Gómez family and interruptions from the lawyers.

"A woman who works at night told us that she knew what happened to Marita. She gave us details of where she had been held captive, and that she was abducted for sexual exploitation in La Rioja. I could not believe these things existed," Trimarco said.

Verón's mother rejected the other scenarios, and criticized the work of Ernesto Baaclini, then secretary of the Office of Instruction VIII, who was in charge of the investigation when district attorney Joaquina Vermal died.

When at last she arrived at a brothel in La Rioja, she did not find Verón. But a girl, Anahi, ran into her arms and begged her to rescue her. She told her that her daughter had been seen the previous week, and related the ordeal she had lived through. It was the first of many harrowing testimonies.

"Unfortunately I became a specialist in this crime because I touched it, I lived it. And I search for my daughter. I'll never give up the search; whoever falls, falls. My mission is my daughter. I do not want to close my eyes before finding out about her. There are many missing girls who we are helping, but I care about my daughter," Trimarco said firmly.

On Tuesday, December 11, 2012, a three-judge Tucumán provincial court cleared all 13 defendants of all charges. Attorneys representing Verón's mother accused the three judges of corruption.

The judge argued on Piedrabuena December 11, 2012, said, "There were no elements to prove the kidnapping of Marita. The versions are about just such. It took 10 years, the dossier has 55 bodies, and still it was poorly investigated. No evidence was obtained that could prove she was kidnapped to force her into prostitution".

The acquittal of the defendants led to widespread protests around Argentina. Anonymous people published the personal data, addresses, telephone and bank statements of the judges in the Verón case. The group also hacked government webpages.

Numerous marches in support of Susana Trimarco were called in different cities of Argentina, with the people demanding justice for Marita Verón.

A week later, Trimarco met with Argentina's president, and impeachment proceedings were started against the 3 judges who had delivered the verdict. In December 2013, ten of the original 13 defendants were convicted of the kidnapping and sexual exploitation of Marita Verón.

Michelle Obama, Nobel Laureate Adolfo Pérez Esquivel and others have presented their respect and support to Susana Trimarco, a nominee for the Nobel Peace Prize for her unrelenting work against human trafficking.

== See also ==
- Human rights in Argentina
- Human trafficking in Argentina
- Le viste la cara a Dios
- List of people who disappeared mysteriously (2000–present)
- Susana Trimarco
