= 44th Martín Fierro Awards =

Radio and television awards in Argentina

44th Annual Martín Fierro Awards
- Awarded for: Martín Fierro Awards for works from 2013
- Sponsored by: APTRA
- Date: May 18, 2014
- Location: Hilton Hotel
- Country: Argentina
- Reward: Martín Fierro Awards
- First award: 2014

Highlights
- Most nominations: Farsantes

Television/radio coverage
- Network: El Trece

The 44th Annual Martín Fierro Awards, presented by APTRA, were held on May 18, 2014. During the ceremony, APTRA gave the Martín Fierro Awards for 2013 works.

== Nominations ==
The nominations for the 44th Annual Martín Fierro Awards were announced by Carlos Sciacaluga, president of APTRA, on April 15, 2014. The ceremony will be held at the Hilton Hotel on May 18, and it will be televised by El Trece. The telenovela Farsantes got the highest number of nominations, with 13 nominations, followed by the telenovelas Solamente Vos and Los vecinos en guerra.

The Kirchnerite journalist Víctor Hugo Morales, TV host of Bajada de línea, announced that he would resign from the ceremony. He did so when he began to receive public praise for the nomination. Jorge Rial, who had criticized the nominations at previous years and resigned when nominated, was not nominated for the 44th ceremony.

The newspaper La Nación commented that the nominations may have controversial selections. The nominations for best production and best program for kids mix programs of unrelated styles, making comparisons difficult. The best daily telecomedy includes Mis amigos de siempre, which began airing in 2014, and which already had a genre shift into drama by the time of the nominations.

The documents that certified the nominations were distributed on May 6, at the Hilton hotel. Florencia de la V made her first public appearance since the death of the fashion designer Jorge Ibáñez, close friend of her. The actor Julio Chávez and the producer Sebastián Ortega did not attend the ceremony because of other duties. Nicolás Francella and Peter Lanzani received the documents for their telenovela Aliados, on behalf of the whole cast. Natalia Oreiro, who had just returned from a tour in Russia, arrived to the hotel while the ceremony was still going on.

== Ceremony ==
The 2013 ceremony had politically loaded speeches by the winners. The 2014 ceremony was instead largely devoid of such controversies, and most winners just voiced their gratitude. Jorge Lanata, who starred most of the controversies of the previous year, made just a simple joke: he attended the ceremony with a can of gasoline. He said that he would set himself on fire if 678 received the Martín Fierro.

The telenovela Farsantes won the Golden Martín Fierro Award at the end of the ceremony. The actor Facundo Arana did not attend the ceremony, as he had conflicts with the other actors. Fellow actor Alfredo Casero and producer Adrián Suar praised his work in the telenovela.

== Awards ==
=== Television ===
Winners are listed first and highlighted in boldface. Other nominations are listed in alphabetic order.

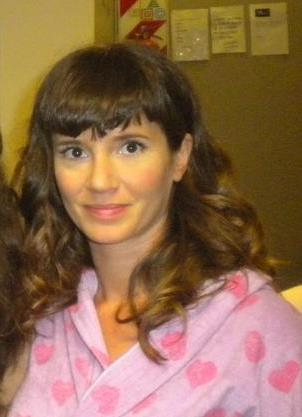
Griselda Siciliani, best lead actress of daily drama

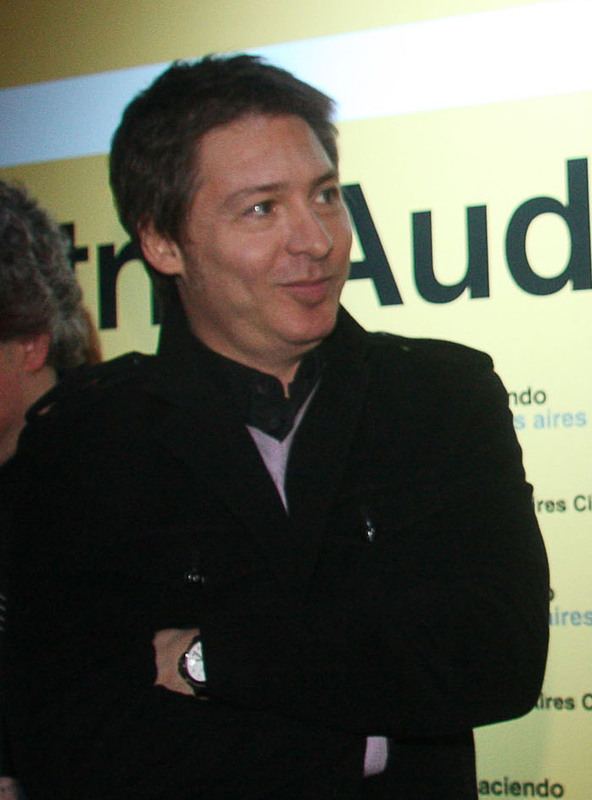
Adrián Suar, best lead actor of daily telecomedy

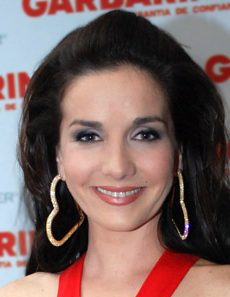
Natalia Oreiro, best lead actress of daily telecomedy

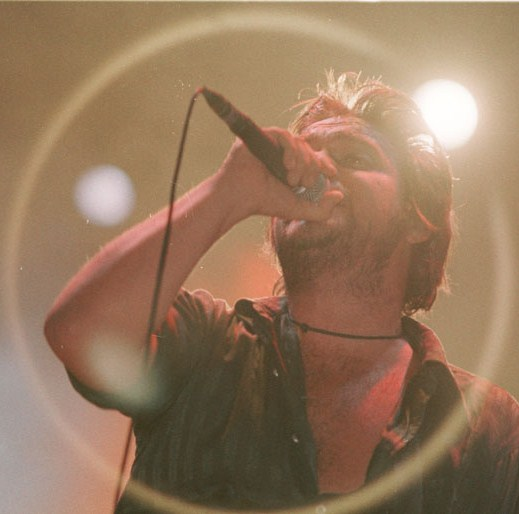
Vicentico, author of "Puro Teatro", best opening theme

Best journalist program	Best miniseries
**Periodismo para todos**; 6, 7, 8; Bajada de línea	**En terapia**; Homenaje a teatro abierto; Santos y pecadores
Best daily drama	Best daily telecomedy
**Farsantes**; Dulce amor; Esa Mujer	**Solamente Vos**; Los vecinos en guerra; Mis amigos de siempre
Best TV news	Best humoristic program
**Telefe Noticias**; América Noticias; Telenoche	**Peligro: sin codificar**; La Pelu; Peter Capusotto y sus videos
Best production	Best male TV host
**Tu cara me suena**; Fútbol para todos; Periodismo para todos	**Alejandro Fantino** - **Animales Sueltos**; Santiago del Moro - Infama; Guido Kaczka - A todo o nada; Marley - Tu cara me suena; Leonardo Montero - Am, Antes del Mediodía
Best female TV host	Best magazine
**Andrea Politti** - **Los unos y los otros**; Mariana Fabbiani - El diario de Mariana; Susana Giménez - Susana Giménez; Mirtha Legrand - Almorzando con Mirtha Legrand; Cristina Pérez - Telefe Noticias	**Susana Giménez**; Gracias por venir, gracias por estar; Televisión Registrada
Best cultural TV program	Best entertainment program or reality show
**Borges por Piglia**; Ecos de mi tierra; Puerto cultura	**Tu cara me suena**; A todo o nada; Extreme Makeover
Best TV program for kids	Best lead actor of daily drama
**Aliados**; Plim Plim; Una tarde cualquiera	**Julio Chávez** - **Farsantes**; Facundo Arana - Farsantes; Alfredo Casero - Farsantes; Juan Darthés - Dulce amor; Benjamín Vicuña - Farsantes
Best lead actor of daily comedy	Best lead actress of daily drama
**Adrián Suar** - **Solamente Vos**; Mike Amigorena - Los vecinos en guerra; Nicolás Cabré - Mis amigos de siempre; Osvaldo Laport - Mis amigos de siempre; Diego Torres - Los vecinos en guerra	**Griselda Siciliani** - **Farsantes**; Celeste Cid - Sos mi hombre; Andrea del Boca - Esa Mujer; Laura Novoa - Dulce amor; Carina Zampini - Dulce amor
Best lead actress of daily telecomedy	Best sports TV program
**Natalia Oreiro** - **Solamente vos**; Agustina Cherri - Mis amigos de siempre; Calu Rivero - Mis amigos de siempre; Soledad Silveyra - Mis amigos de siempre; Eleonora Wexler - Los vecinos en guerra	**Fútbol para todos**; Carburando; El show del fútbol
Best female journalist	Best male journalist
**Gabriela Radice - Visión 7**; Luciana Geuna - Periodismo para todos; María Julia Oliván - Intratables	**Jorge Lanata** - **Periodismo para todos**; Pedro Brieger - Visión 7; Reynaldo Sietecase - Telefe Noticias
Best news reporter	Best lead actor of miniseries
**Julio Bazan** - **Telenoche**; Pía Shaw - Am, Antes del Mediodía; Martina Soto Pose - Caiga quien caiga	**Diego Peretti** - **En terapia**; Alejandro Awada * Decir sí, homenaje a teatro abierto and La mamá de Santiago -Historias de corazón; Juan Leyrado - El juez fiaca, Santos y pecadores and Decir sí, homenaje a teatro abierto; Jorge Marrale - Historias de diván; Miguel Angel Sola - Germán, últimas viñetas and La mujer deseada y La sierra de los Benteveos, Historias de corazón
Best lead actress of miniseries	Best work in humor
**Claudia Lapacó** - Tita Merello, cuando yo me vaya and Historia clínica; Julieta Díaz - Tita Merello, cuando yo me vaya and Historia clínica; Marilú Marini - Tercero incluido, homenaje a teatro abierto; Ingrid Pelicori - Mi cuerpo, mi vida; Eleonora Wexler - Eva Perón, actriz de reparto de su propio drama, Historia clínica and ¿Cómo sabemos que Romeo está enamorado de Julieta?	**Martín Mariano Campilongo** - **Peligro: sin codificar**; Diego Capusotto - Peter Capusotto y sus videos; José Carlos Guridi - Peligro: sin codificar
Best secondary actor	Best secondary actress
**Roberto Carnaghi** - **En terapia**; Arturo Puig - Solamente Vos; Juan Minujín - Solamente Vos; Lito Cruz - Solamente Vos; Mario Pasik - Los vecinos en guerra and Farsantes	**Vivian El Jaber** - **Farsantes**; Norma Aleandro - En terapia; Mirta Busnelli - Los vecinos en guerra; Luisana Lopilato - En terapia; Julieta Zylberberg - Farsantes
Best news actor or actress	Best script writers
**Juan Pablo Geretto** - Los vecinos en guerra; Nicolás Francella - Aliados; María Luján Lamas - Farsantes; Lola Poggio - Solamente Vos; Gonzalo Slipak - En terapia	**Carolina Aguirre and Mario Segade** - **Farsantes**; Alejandro Maci and Esther Feldman - En terapia; Lily Ann Martin, Marta Betoldi and Daniel Cuparo - Solamente Vos
Best director	Best opening theme
**Daniel Barone and Lucas Gil** - **Farsantes**; Alejandro Maci - En terapia; R. Antunez, C. Ferrari, J. Nisco, S. Pivotto and M. Saban - Solamente Vos	**"Puro teatro"** - **Farsantes** **(by Vicentico)**; "Aliados" - Aliados (by Peter Lanzani); "Solamente vos" - Solamente Vos (by Coti)
Best advertisement	Golden Martín Fierro Award
**Campaña abuela (for Speedy and Telefónica de Argentina)**; Campaña Likestar de Fibertel (for Fibertel); Casi idénticos (for Beldent); Jogo Bendito (for TyC Sports); Madres extraordinarias (for Bon o Bon and Grupo Arcor)	**Farsantes**

=== Radio ===
Winners are listed first and highlighted in boldface. Other nominations are listed in alphabetic order.

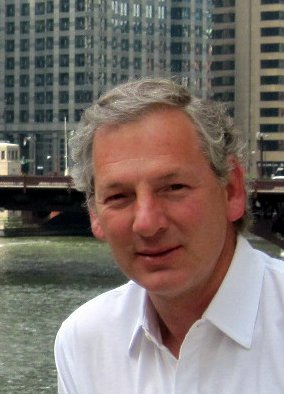
Marcelo Longobardi, best male host.

Best journalist program	Best female journalist
**Getap**; Esto que pasa; Lanata sin filtro	**Romina Manguel** (Getap); María O'Donnell (Magdalena Tempranísimo]; Mercedes Ninci (Lanata sin filtro)
Best female host	Best work in humor
**María Isabel Sánchez** (Encendidos En La Tarde and Cada Mañana); Elizabeth Vernaci (Negrópolis); Rosario Lufrano (Rosario por la mañana)	**Rolo Villar** (Cada mañana); Adrián Stoppelman (La Mañana); Enrique Pinti (Magdalena Tempranísimo)
Best male journalist	Best cultural program
**Facundo Pastor** (El exprimidor); Alfredo Leuco (Bravo Continental); Edgardo Alfano (Magdalena tempranísimo)	**Los caminos de Pacho O'Donnell**; Biblioteca Nacional; Las dos carátulas
Best musical program	Best sports program
**Aspen Club**; Canciones son amores; Talento con T de Tango	**La Oral Deportiva**; Rock and Closs; Super Mitre deportivo
Best news program	Best general interest program
**Mitre Informa Primero**; Red informativa; Siempre noticias	**Radio Continental**; La mañana; Negrópolis
Best male host	
**Marcelo Longobardi**; Andy Kusnetzoff (Perros de la calle); Santiago del Moro (Mañanas campestres)	

=== Honorary awards ===
Arturo Puig is an actor with a long career in the Argentine television. Although many of his programs were awarded in the past, he had never received a personal award. He was nominated as best secondary actor, but lost to Roberto Carnaghi. APTRA gave him an honorary award, acknowledging his career.
