= 48th Martín Fierro Awards =

2018 Argentinian television and radio awards

48th Annual Martín Fierro Awards
- Awarded for: Martín Fierro Awards for 2017 Argentine television and radio programs
- Sponsored by: Asociación de Periodistas de la Televisión y Radiofonía Argentina
- Date: June 3, 2018
- Location: Alvear Icon Hotel
- Country: Argentina
- Hosted by: Marley
- Act: Lali Espósito
- Reward: Martín Fierro Awards
- First award: 2018

Television/radio coverage
- Network: Telefe

The 48th Annual Martín Fierro Awards, presented by the Asociación de Periodistas de la Televisión y Radiofonía Argentina (APTRA), was held on June 3, 2018. It was held at the Alvear Icon Hotel located in the Puerto Madero neighbourhood of Buenos Aires. During the ceremony, APTRA announced the Martín Fierro Awards for 2017 Argentine television and radio programs. The ceremony was hosted by Marley and was broadcast on Telefe. Telefe had last broadcast the awards show in 2013; the previous four award ceremonies had been broadcast by eltrece.

The shortlists were announced on May 8 on the Cortá por Lozano program.

The singer Lali Espósito opened the ceremony with a musical act, performing the songs; "100 Grados", "Tu Novia" and "Una Na".

== Awards ==
Winners are listed first and highlighted in boldface. Other nominations are listed in alphabetic order.

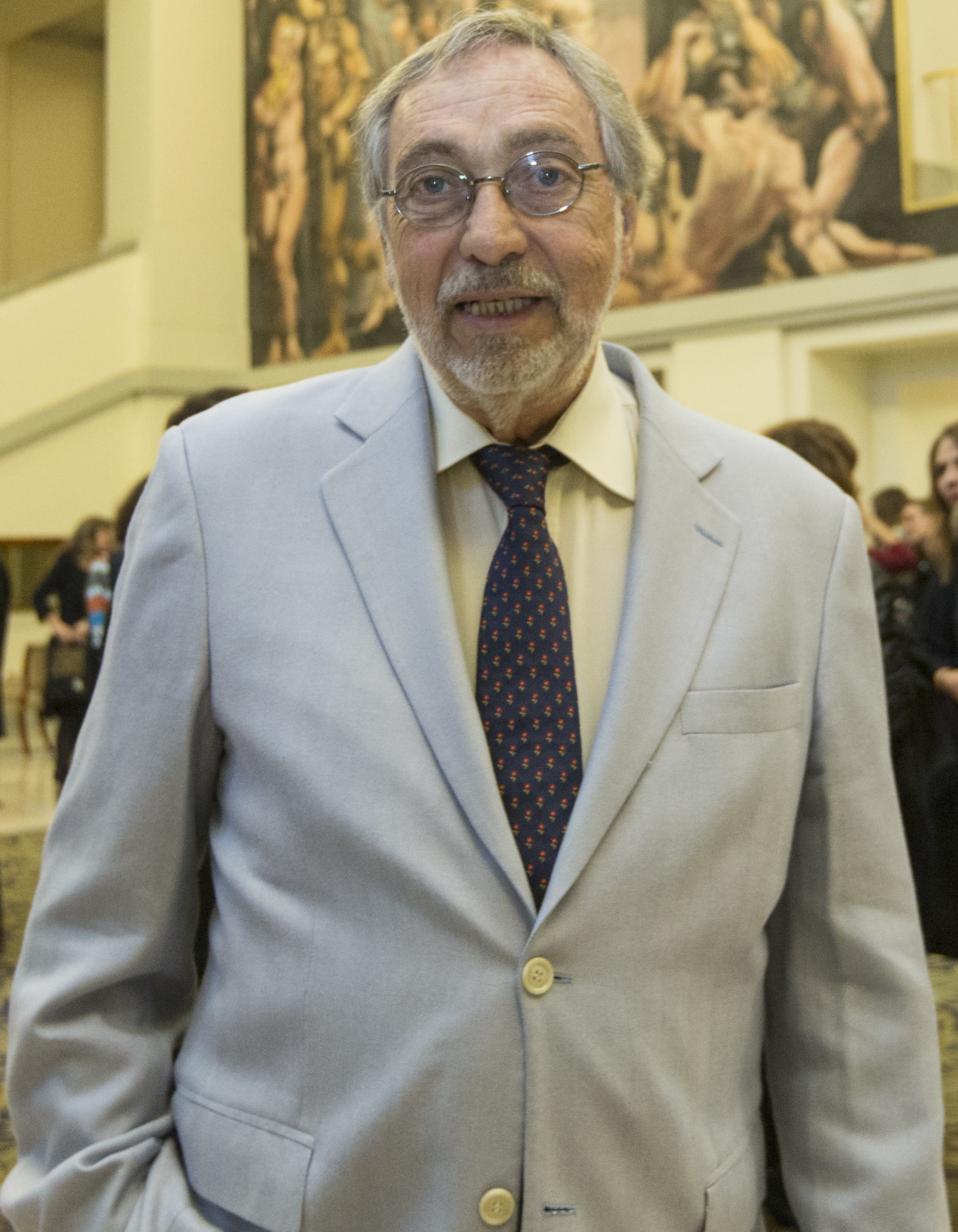
Luis Brandoni, best lead actor in miniseries

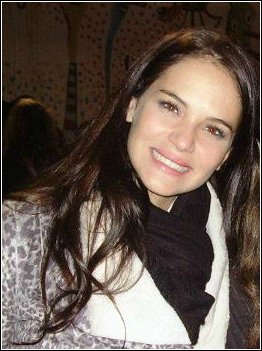
Luz Cipriota, best supporting actress

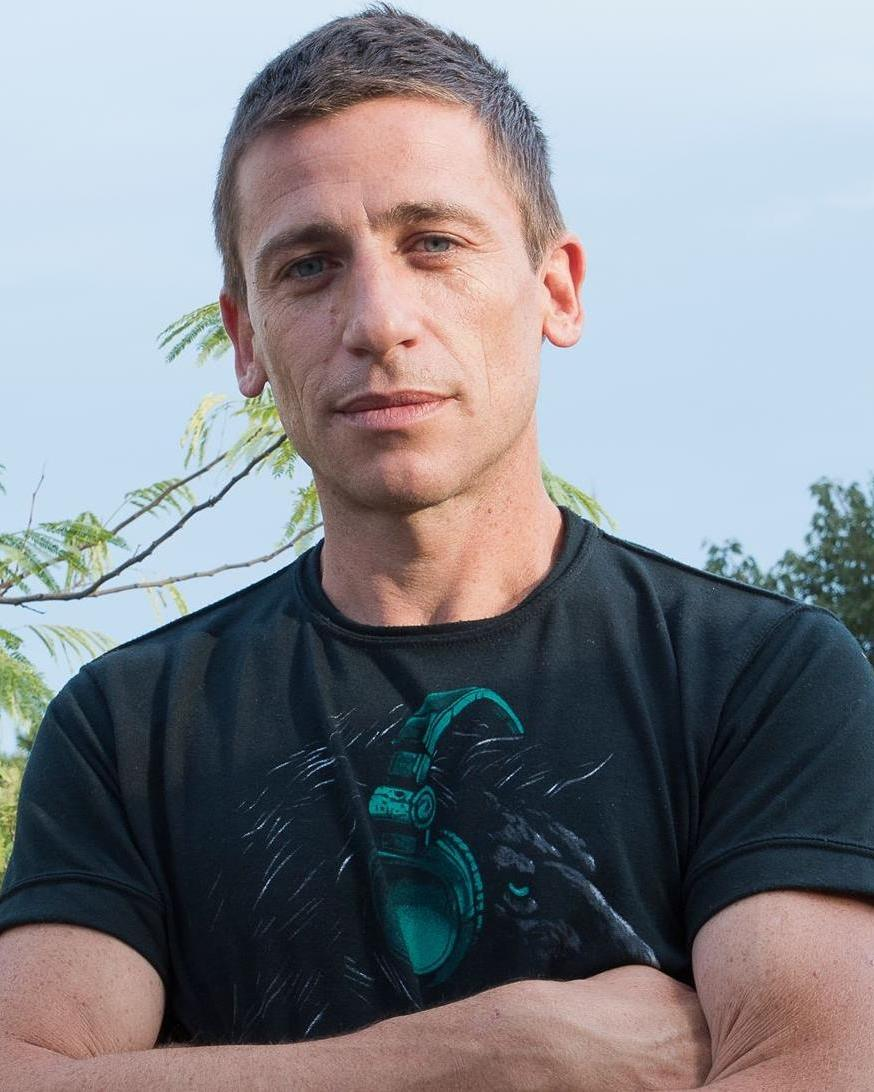
Diego Cremonesi, best newcomer

Best daily fiction	Best miniseries
**Las Estrellas**; Amar después de amar; Cuéntame cómo pasó	**Un gallo para Esculapio**; Cartoneros; El maestro
Best lead actor in daily fiction	Best lead actress in daily fiction
**Esteban Lamothe** (for Las Estrellas); Federico Amador (for Amar después de amar); Nicolás Cabré (for Cuéntame cómo pasó)	**Violeta Urtizberea** (for Las Estrellas); Natalie Pérez (for Las Estrellas); Eleonora Wexler (for Amar después de amar & Golpe al corazón)
Best lead actor in miniseries	Best lead actress in miniseries
**Luis Brandoni** (for Un gallo para Esculapio); Julio Chávez (for El maestro); Peter Lanzani (for Un gallo para Esculapio)	**Eva De Dominici** (for La fragilidad de los cuerpos); Eleonora Wexler (for Un gallo para Esculapio); Inés Estévez (for El maestro)
Best supporting actor	Best supporting actress
**Luis Luque** (for Un gallo para Esculapio); Carlos Belloso (for Quiero vivir a tu lado); Nicolás Francella (for Las Estrellas])	**Luz Cipriota** (for El maestro); Julieta Nair Calvo (for Las Estrellas]); Julieta Ortega (for Un gallo para Esculapio)
Best writer	Best newcomer
**Bruno Stagnaro** & **Ariel Staltari** (for Un gallo para Esculapio); Gonzalo Demaría & Erika Halvorsen (for Amar después de amar); Gonzalo Demaría & Romina Paula (for El maestro)	**Diego Cremonesi** (for Un gallo para Esculapio); Carla Quevedo (for El maestro); Florencia Vigna (for Quiero vivir a tu lado)
Best humoristic program	Best cultural/educational TV program
**Polémica en el bar**; NotiCampi; Peter Capusotto y sus videos	**Ambiente y medio**; Noticias de ayer; Todo tiene un porqué
Best sports program	Best musical program
**Pasión por el fútbol**; Arena extreme; Locos por el fútbol	**La peña de morfi**; Conciertos en el CCK; Ojos de videotape
Best male journalist	Best female journalist
**Facundo Pastor** (for América noticias); Reynaldo Sietecase (for Telefe Noticias); Nicolás Wiñazki (for Telenoche)	**Mariana Contartessi** (for Te cuento al mediodía); Gisela Busaniche (for Telefe Noticias); Mariel Fitz Patrick (for Animales Sueltos)
Best journalistic program	Best news reporter
**Debo decir**; Cada noche; La cornisa; Periodismo para todos	**Guillermo Panizza** (for Telefe Noticias); Dominique Metzger (for Telenoche); Valeria Sampedro (for Arriba Argentinos & Notitrece)
Best panelist	Best TV program for kids
**Samuel Gelblung** (for Pamela a la tarde); Ivana Nadal (for Despedida de Solteros); Mauro Szeta (for Cortá por Lozano)	**Piñón en familia**; Divina, está en tu corazón; El universo de Lourdes
Best TV News	Best entertaining program
**Telefe noticias a las 20**; América noticias - Segunda edición; Síntesis; Televisión Pública noticias a las 21	**Susana Giménez**; A todo o nada; Combate
Best reality show	Best general interest program
**Showmatch**; Caniggia libre; Dueños de la cocina	**PH, podemos hablar**; La noche de Mirtha Legrand; Por el mundo
Best magazine	Best work in humor
**Pamela a la tarde**; Cortá por Lozano; El diario de Mariana	**Roberto Moldavsky** (for Morfi, todos a la mesa); Martín Campilongo (for NotiCampi & Peligro: sin codificar); Lizy Tagliani (for ¿En qué mano está?, Peligro: sin codificar & Susana Giménez)
Best male TV host	Best female TV host
**Guido Kaczka** (for A todo o nada, Hacelo feliz & Lo mejor de la familia); Santiago del Moro (for Intratables); Marcelo Tinelli (for Showmatch); Alejandro Wiebe (for Despedida de Solteros, Marley presenta, Por el mundo & The Wall: Construye tu vida)	**Susana Gimenez** (for Susana Giménez); Mariana Fabbiani (for El diario de Mariana); Verónica Lozano (for Cortá por Lozano)
Best director	Best general production
**Bruno Stagnaro** (for Un gallo para Esculapio); Daniel Barone (for El maestro); Jorge Bechara & Daniel Galimberti (for Cuéntame cómo pasó)	**Susana Giménez**; Showmatch; Un gallo para Esculapio
Best advertisement	Best opening theme
**El vino, la primera red social** (by Liebre Amotinada for Fondo Vitivinícola de Mendoza); Casa (by FCB&Fire for Poett Fraganza); Estamos más cerca de lo que creemos (by Grey Argentina for Coca-Cola)	**Los sueños del ayer** (by Alejandro Lerner for Cuéntame cómo pasó); El baile de la vida (by Eric Bobo for Un gallo para Esculapio); La Leona (by Daniela Herrero for Las Estrellas)
Martín Fierro Award: Lifetime Achievement	Martín Fierro Award: People's Award
**Mirtha Legrand** (For the 50th anniversary of Almorzando con Mirtha Legrand)	**Susana Giménez**
Golden Martín Fierro Award	
**Un gallo para Esculapio**	

== In Memoriam ==
As is tradition an in memoriam segment tribute was paid to the artists who had died between June 2017 and June 2018. The Mexican singer Carlos Rivera sang the Academy Award for Best Original Song winner "Remember Me" from the Disney movie Coco, while the images of the deceased artists were shown.

- Augusto Souza
- Elida Marletta
- Carlos Miceli
- Elsa Daniel
- Carlos Silveyra
- Rocío Gancedo
- Carlos Ameijeiras
- Estela Molly
- Federico Luppi
- Fernando Heredia
- Sandra Villani
- Gastón Tavagnutti
- Hugo De Bruna
- Alba Arnova
- Pablo Cedrón
- Luis Alberto Yorlano
- Nelly Durán
- Jorge Nolasco
- Mario Galvano
- Nacho Steinberg
- Aníbal Montecchia
- Maximiliano Paz
- Nico Stratico
- Lito Cruz
- Martín Rocco
- Emilio Disi
- Omar Aranda Lamadrid
- Maximino Moyano
- Rubén Roberts
- Vicky Olivares
- Francisco Javier
- Luis Andrada
- Víctor Bruno
- Wagner Mautone
- Carmen Vázquez-Vigo
- Omar Pini
- María Danelli
- Juan José Stagnaro
- Gustavo Mac Lennan
- Mario Filgueira
- Luis Farinello
- Iris Alonso
- Edgardo Antoñana
- Landrú
- María Martha Serra Lima
- Hugo Jaime
- Oscar Otranto
- Hugo Santiago
- Débora Pérez Volpin
