= Tu cara me suena (Argentine TV series) season 1 =

Tu cara me suena
- Season 1

Release
- Original network: Telefe
- Original release: September 23 – December 18, 2013

Season chronology
- Next → Season 2

Season one of Tu Cara me Suena premiered on September 23, 2013. Cacho Castaña, Elizabeth Vernacci and Joaquín Galán debuted conforming the panel of judges; Marley Wiebe presented the show.

== Celebrities ==
The number of celebrities for this season, was eight. The cast included actors, comedians and singer from different ages and areas of the Argentine entertainment.

Celebrity	Occupation / known for	Status
Rocío Guirao Díaz	Fashion model	8th place on December 16, 2013
Jey Mammon	Comedian	7th place on December 16, 2013
Pablo Granados	Comedian & singer	6th place on December 18, 2013
Benjamin Amadeo	Actor	5th place on December 18, 2013
Carmen Barbieri	Former vedette & creative director	4th place on December 18, 2013
Lucía Galán	Pimpinela member and singer	Third place on December 18, 2013
Martín "Campi" Campilongo	Comedian	Runner-up on December 18, 2013
Laura Esquivel	Former Patito Feo actress & singer	Winner on December 18, 2013

== Scoring chart ==
Celebrity	Place	1	2	3	4	5	6	7	8	9	10	11	12	Total	R	F1	F2
Laura	1	27	39	41	35	23	15	38	19	19	52	32	22	362		Advanced	44.33%
Campi	2	14	45	18	33	36	38	25	34	14	34	17	31	339	48	Advanced	38.36%
Lucía	3	48	26	27	31	24	27	28	25	35	62	36	21	380		Advanced	9.99%
Carmen	4	40	29	32	30	19	36	29	36	33	21	29	47	381		Advanced	7.33%
Benjamín	5	20	23	21	24	49	22	20	27	35	30	55	37	363		Didn't advance	
Pablo	6	19	18	21	28	18	37	42	23	20	26	53	26	331	40	Didn't advance	
Jey	7	33	22	29	18	38	38	17	36	22	36	42	13	344	37		
Rocío	8	19	18	31	21	13	17	21	20	42	22	19	26	269	32		

Red numbers indicate the lowest score for each week
Green numbers indicate the highest score for each week
the celebrity eliminated that week
the celebrity did not perform as she/he advanced to the finale
the winning celebrity
the runner-up celebrity
the third-place celebrity

== Main show details ==
=== Week 1 (April 16) ===
Running order

Celebrity	Artist	Song
Florencia Peña	Karina	"Con la misma moneda"
Coki Ramírez	Lady Gaga	"Poker Face"
Jey & Laura	Franco De Vita & A. Guzmán	"Tan Sólo Tú"
Angela	Taylor Swift	"We Are Never Ever Getting Back Together"
Miguel Ángel	Barry White	"You're the First, the Last, My Everything"
Augusto	Bruno Mars	"Locked Out of Heaven"
Pichu	Dyango	"Corazon mágico"
Hernán	Chayanne	"Atado a Tu Amor"
Georgina	Gal Costa	"Um Dia De Domingo"

== Imitations chart ==
The following chart contains the names of the iconic singers that the celebrities imitated every week.

Celebrity	Week 1	Week 2	Week 3	Week 4	Week 5	Week 6	Week 7	Week 8	Week 9	Week 10	Week 11	Week 12	Week 13	
Laura	Justin Bieber	Christina Aguilera	Whitney Houston	Michael Jackson	Lady Gaga	Palito Ortega	Beyoncé	Spice Girls	Gilda	Elena Roger	Selena Gomez	Axl Rose		Cyndi Lauper
Campi	Gustavo Cordera	M. M. S. Lima	Village People	Cacho Castaña	Sergio Denis	Mercedes Sosa	Banana Pueyrredón	Estela Raval	Elvis Presley	Dyango	ABBA	Horacio Guarany	Roberto Goyeneche	Adrián Otero
Lucía	Adele	Raphael	Tina Turner	Céline Dion	J. Luis Guerra	Jesse & Joy	Mariah Carey	Barbra Streisand	Patricia Sosa	Susan Boyle	Isabel Pantoja	Gloria Gaynor		Marilina Ross
Carmen	Celia Cruz	Alberto Castillo	Luciano Pavarotti	Liza Minnelli	Cher	Lia Crucet	Sandro	La Mona Jiménez	Tita Merello	Violeta Rivas	Andrea Bocelli	Louis Armstrong		Rubén Rada
Benjamín	Gal Costa	Maná												
Pablo	Chayanne	Rod Stewart												
Jey	F. De Vita & A. Guzmán	J. Travolta & Olivia N-J												
Rocío	Barry White	Roberto Carlos												

Highest scoring performance
Lowest scoring performance
