= Telefe Internacional =

International feed of Argentine TV network Telefe

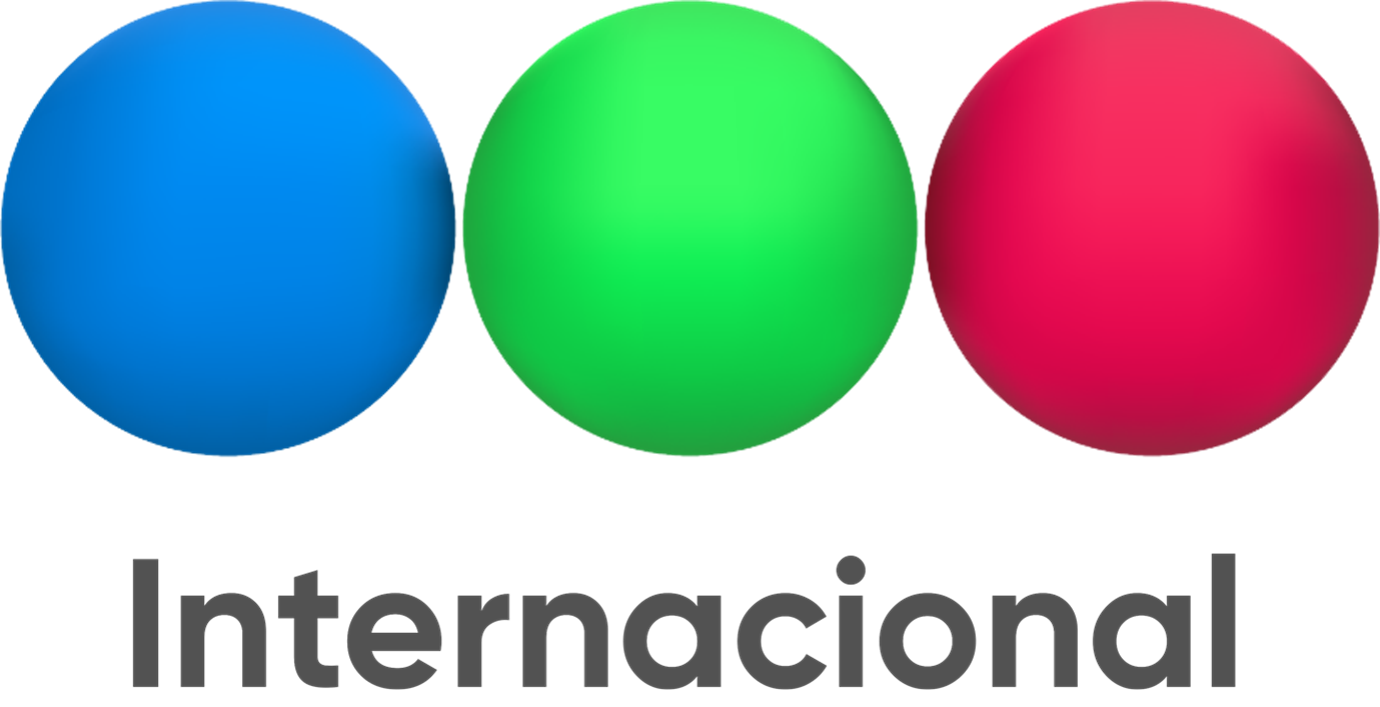
- Country: Argentina; Israel; United Kingdom; Netherlands; Brazil; Paraguay
- Broadcast area: Asia, Argentina, Americas, Europe, Oceania, Israel
- Network: Telefe
- Headquarters: Asunción 949 Entre Avenidas Cuyo 1874 y Prilidiano Puerreydón 2989, Martínez, Buenos Aires, Argentina

Programming
- Language: Spanish
- Picture format: 1080i HDTV (downscaled to 576i/480i for the SD feed)

Ownership
- Owner: Grupo Televisión Litoral
- Sister channels: Telefe

History
- Launched: 1998; 28 years ago

Links
- Website: http://www.telefe.com/

Availability

Streaming media
- Sling TV: Internet Protocol television
- DirecTV Stream: Internet Protocol television
- FuboTV: Internet Protocol television

Telefe Internacional is the international signal of the Argentine television channel Telefe. It broadcasts television programs produced by Telefe, mostly consisting of telenovelas, series, comedies, teen and children's series, etc. It is available in countries including Argentina. The channel is owned by Grupo Televisión Litoral.

== History ==
Telefe Internacional was launched on April 6, 1998. It has been operating satellite television channels world-wide, including in Asia, America, Europe, Oceania and Canada, Israel broadcasts novels, series, entertainment, news and sports programming produced by Telefe, to Argentinian and Spanish-speaking people. It has only an international feed with the time of Buenos Aires.

Negotiations to add the channel to the Spanish-language package of DirecTV in the United States began in 2000 and were only confirmed in March 2001; the channel was added on the 26th of the month. This coincided with the creation of a unified sales structure (programs, channel, formats) from Miami, this being its first act.

In Latin America, it has been available on DirecTV since 2007. It is available in Colombia, Peru and Venezuela through Movistar TV, and in Mexico through Totalplay and Axtel TV, plus a handful cable and satellite operators. An HD simulcast was available on VTR in Chile and is available in Movistar TV.

In Spain, Telefe International was available in Movistar Plus+ and the channel is carried by other Spanish TV operators. In Israel, Hot has the signal since June 25, 2008, for the Hispanic community. The channel was launched at the Tel Aviv Cervantes Institute.

In Argentina, Telefe International is also available in the that country and the channel is carried by other Argentine TV operators.

In the United States, it arrived on March 26, 2001. Now Telefe International is available nationwide via satellite services (Dish Network, and DirecTV) and in cable operators, (Comcast, Cablevision, etc.). It is present in New York City, Miami, Washington, D.C., New Jersey, Florida, Los Angeles, Boston and other cities. In Canada, Telus TV, Bell Satellite TV, and Shaw Cable added the channel on April 16, 2015.

== Signal structure ==
- International signal: covers all Asia, Americas including Argentina, Europe and Oceania countries. Use as reference the timetables of Buenos Aires (UTC-3), Miami (UTC-5/-4 DST) and Los Angeles (UTC-8/-7 DST).

== Programming ==
Telefe Internacional broadcasts news bulletins, sports news, soap operas, comedies, series, teen and children's series, entertainment programs, magazines, etc.

=== Telenovelas ===
- Dulce amor
- Educando a Nina
- Graduados
- La leona
- Montecristo
- Somos familia

=== Series ===
- Aliados
- Historia clínica
- Los simuladores
- Historia de un clan
- Entre caníbales

=== Reality/Variety ===
- MasterChef Argentina
- Elegidos, la música en tus manos
- Tu cara me suena
- Peligro: sin codificar

=== Children ===
- Chiquititas

=== News magazines ===
- AM
- Morfi, todos a la mesa
- UPlay
- Íntimo

=== News ===
- Telefe Noticias

=== Sports ===
- El Deportivo

=== Travel ===
- Aislados
- Descubrir América

=== Cultural ===
- Sabores de campo
