= Tu cara me suena (Argentine TV series) season 2 =

Tu cara me suena
- Season 2
- No. of episodes: 1 (as of April 16, 2014)

Release
- Original network: Telefe
- Original release: April 16, 2014 – present

Season chronology
- ← Previous; 1

Season two of Tu Cara me Suena premiered on April 16, 2014. Cacho Castaña and Elizabeth Vernacci returned as judges along with new member of the panel, Enrique Pinti; Marley Wiebe returned as host.

== Celebrities ==
This season increased the number of celebrities from eight to ten. However, two celebrities of the entire cast, Laura Esquivel and Jey Mammon, are competing as a duet and every week of the competition, they will emulate couples. The cast includes actors, comedians and singer from different ages and areas of the Argentine entertainment.

Barbie Velez once replaced Angela Torres because she was sick and couldn't get to the reaharsals.

Celebrity	Occupation / known for	Status
Angela Torres	Singer and actress	Winner
Augusto Schuster	Chilean singer and actor	Participating
Coki Ramírez	Singer-songwriter	7th
Florencia Peña	Actress & comedian	3rd
Georgina Barbarossa	Actress	8th
Hernán Drago	Fashion male model	Participating
Jey Mammon	Comedian	4th
Laura Esquivel	Former Patito Feo actress & singer	4th
Miguel Ángel Rodríguez	Actor	6th
Pichu Straneo	Sin Codificar comedian	5th

== Scoring chart ==
Celebrity	Place	1	2
Angela		32	
Augusto		41	
Coki		26	
Florencia		28	
Georgina		21	
Hernán		12	
Jey y Laura		35	
Miguel A.		19	
Pichu		47	

Red numbers indicate the lowest score for each week
Green numbers indicate the highest score for each week
the celebrity eliminated that week

== Main show details ==
=== Week 1 (April 16) ===
Running order

Celebrity	Artist	Song
Florencia Peña	Karina	"Con la misma moneda"
Coki Ramírez	Lady Gaga	"Poker Face"
Jey & Laura	Franco De Vita & A. Guzmán	"Tan Sólo Tú"
Angela	Taylor Swift	"We Are Never Ever Getting Back Together"
Miguel Ángel	Barry White	"You're the First, the Last, My Everything"
Augusto	Bruno Mars	"Locked Out of Heaven"
Pichu	Dyango	"Corazon mágico"
Hernán	Chayanne	"Atado a Tu Amor"
Georgina	Gal Costa	"Um Dia De Domingo"

== Imitations chart ==
The following chart contains the names of the iconic singers that the celebrities imitated every week.

Couple	Week 1	Week 2
Angela	Taylor Swift	Demi Lovato
Augusto	Bruno Mars	Abel Pintos
Coki Ramirez	Lady Gaga	Donna Summer
Florencia	Karina	Jennifer Lopez
Georgina	Gal Costa	Maná
Hernán	Chayanne	Rod Stewart
Jey & Laura	F. De Vita & A. Guzmán	J. Travolta & Olivia N-J
Miguel A.	Barry White	Roberto Carlos
Pichu	Dyango	Rosana
