= María Isabel Sánchez =

Argentine radio host and writer

María Isabel Sánchez is an Argentine radio host and writer, who works in Encendidos En La Tarde with Gerardo "Tato" Young and Rolo Villar and Alguien Tiene Que Decirlo host by Eduardo Feinmann. Also, she worked in the radio program Cada Mañana, hosted by Marcelo Longobardi with a panel integrated by Villar, Leandro Buonsante and Alberto Cormillot

Sánchez was born to Spanish parents. She has written many romantic novels and self-help books, like Pasiones y tormentos: Cuando el amor lastima, Amores reales and El lado oscuro de los romances de la monarquía.

== Awards ==
- 2013 Martín Fierro Awards: Best female host.
