= Guridi =

Guridi is a surname. Notable people with the surname include:

- Jesús Guridi (1886–1961), Spanish Basque composer
- Jon Guridi (born 1995), Spanish footballer
- José Guridi, Argentine humorist
- José Miguel Guridi y Alcocer (1763–1828), Spanish-Mexican politician
- Máximo de Meana y Guridi (c. 1840–c. 1912), Spanish soldier and politician
- Yayo Guridi (born 1965), Argentine actor and comedian
