= List of awards and nominations received by Graduados =

This is a list of awards of the Argentine TV series Graduados

== Tato Awards ==
Year	Category	Nominee	Result
2012	Program of the year		Winner
2012	Daily fiction		Winner
2012	Production in fiction		Winner
2012	Actress in daily fiction	Nancy Dupláa	Winner
2012	Arts and image in fiction		Winner
2012	Soundtrack		Winner
2012	New actor	Chang Kim Sung	Winner
2012	New actor	Gastón Soffritti	Nominated
2012	New actor	Mercedes Scápola	Nominated
2012	Actor in daily fiction	Daniel Hendler	Winner
2012	Actor in daily fiction	Luciano Cáceres	Nominated
2012	Supporting actor in daily fiction	Roberto Carnaghi	Winner
2012	Supporting actor in daily fiction	Juan Leyrado	Mominated
2012	Supporting actor in daily fiction	Mex Urtizberea	Nominated
2012	Supporting actress in daily fiction	Paola Barrientos	Winner
2012	Supporting actress in daily fiction	Isabel Macedo	Nominated
2012	Supporting actress in daily fiction	Mirta Busnelli	Nominated
2012	Supporting actress in daily fiction	Violeta Urtizberea	Nominated
2012	Director in fiction		Nominated
2012	Scripts		Nominated

== Martín Fierro awards ==
Year	Category	Nominee	Result
2012	Golden Martín Fierro award		Winner
2012	Daily fiction		Winner
2012	Production		Winner
2012	Writer		Winner
2012	Opening theme		Winner
2012	Direction		Nominated
2012	Lead actors of daily fiction	Daniel Hendler	Winner
2012	Lead actors of daily fiction	Luciano Cáceres	Nominated
2012	Secondary actress in daily fiction	Paola Barrientos	Winner
2012	Secondary actress in daily fiction	Mirta Busnelli	Nominated
2012	Lead actress of daily fiction	Isabel Macedo	Winner
2012	Lead actress of daily fiction	Nancy Dupláa	Nominated
2012	New actor	Chang Kim Sung	Nominated
2012	New actor	Jenny Williams	Nominated
2012	Guest appearance	Andy Kusnetzoff	Nominated
2012	Guest appearance	Betiana Blum	Nominated
2012	Secondary actor in daily fiction	Mex Urtizberea	Nominated
2012	Secondary actor in daily fiction	Roberto Carnaghi	Nominated
