= En terapia =

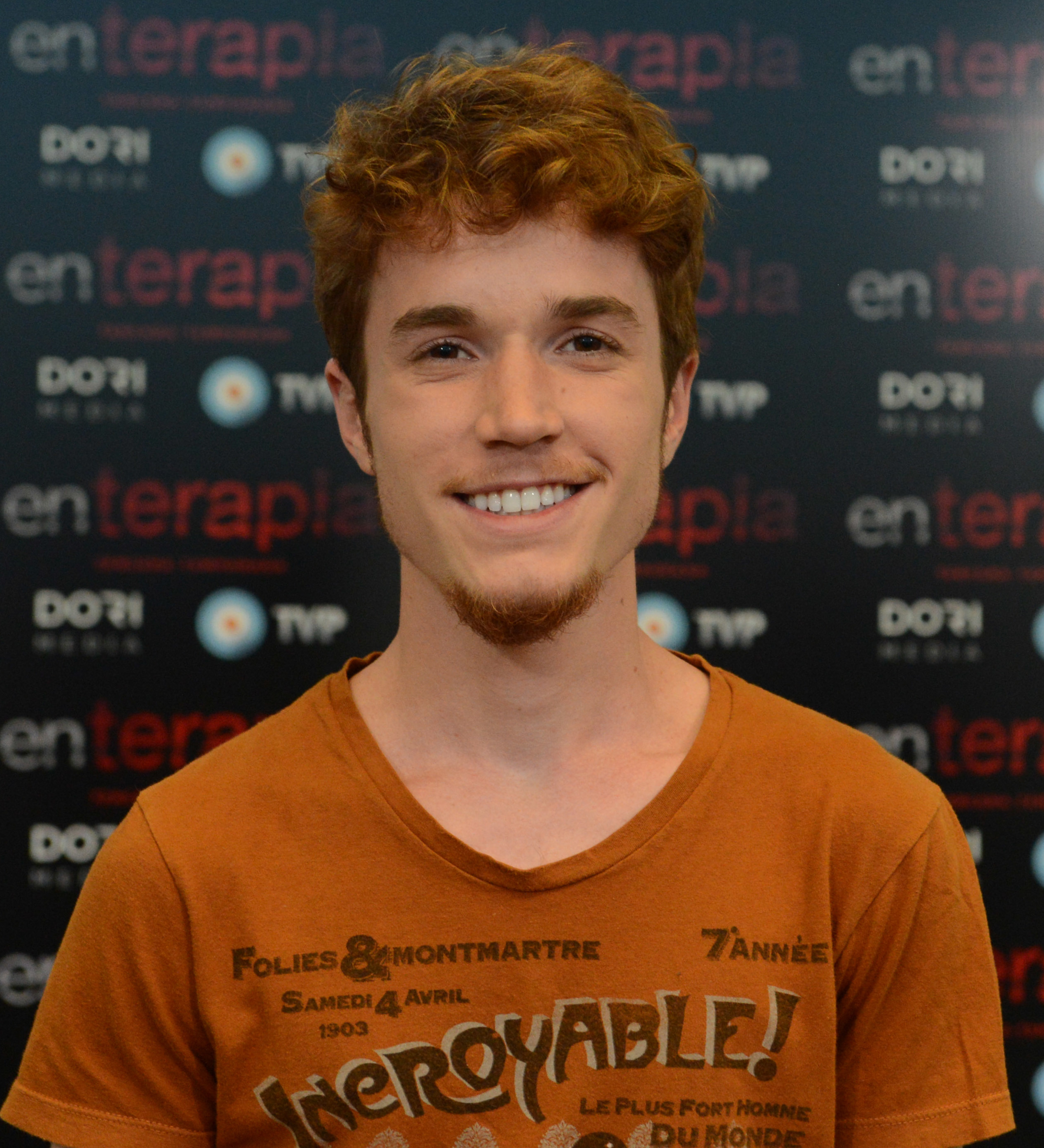
- Genre: Drama
- Based on: BeTipul by Hagai Levi; Ori Sivan; Nir Bergman In Treatment; Developed by Rodrigo García
- Developed by: Alejandro Maci; Esther Feldman
- Directed by: Alejandro Maci
- Starring: Diego Peretti; Julieta Cardinali; Germán Palacios; Ailín Salas; Dolores Fonzi; Leonardo Sbaraglia; Norma Aleandro; Carla Peterson; Roberto Carnaghi; Luisana Lopilato; Cecilia Roth; Julieta Díaz; Darío Grandinetti; Santiago Magariños
- Opening theme: "En terapia theme"
- Ending theme: "En terapia theme"
- Country of origin: Argentina
- Original language: Spanish
- No. of seasons: 3
- No. of episodes: 113

Production
- Executive producers: Verónica Álvarez; Gustavo Villamagna
- Producer: Ariel Fernández
- Production location: Buenos Aires
- Camera setup: Single-camera setup Multicamera setup
- Running time: 30 minutes
- Production companies: TV Pública Digital; Dori Media Group

Original release
- Network: TV Pública
- Release: May 14, 2012 – December 4, 2014

En terapia (In Therapy) is an Argentine drama television miniseries and a remake of BeTipul and In Treatment. It was broadcast between 2012 and 2014 on Argentine Public Television. Diego Peretti stars in all seasons as the protagonist, the psychiatrist Guillermo Montes. The tagline for the series was "El está escuchando" (He is listening).

The main actors in the first season Julieta Cardinali, Germán Palacios, Ailín Salas, Dolores Fonzi, Leonardo Sbaraglia and Norma Aleandro.

The second season, in 2013, added Carla Peterson, Gonzalo Slipak, Roberto Carnaghi and Luisana Lopilato. Aleandro's final appearance in the series was in the last episode of season 2.

The third and final season of the show was released in 2014 and again featured Peretti alongside Cecilia Roth, Julieta Díaz, Santiago Magariños and Darío Grandinetti.

== Plot ==
In therapy is a series that focuses on the psychoanalysis sessions of Mr. Guillermo Montes (Diego Peretti) throughout his week, showing in each of various patients.

== First season ==
On Monday he treats Marina Generis (Julieta Cardinali), a hysterical 30 year-old who, at the beginning of the series, reveals that she is deeply in love with him. On Tuesdays they focus on the therapy of Gastón Ramírez (Germán Palacios), a rigid police officer of the Federal Police Argentina that enters an identity crisis that touches relationships with his family and his sexual identity. Wednesdays follow the sessions of Clara Salinas (Ailín Salas), a 17-year-old classical dancer who enters therapy after an alleged attempt at suicide, and is unable to confront her father for the toxic relationship that unites them. Thursday is the turn of the marriage of Ana Irigoyen (Dolores Fonzi) and Martín Pineda (Leonardo Sbaraglia), a couple that begins the sessions by their disagreement before the news of a pregnancy that they don't know if abort or not, and whose treatment is complicated because they cannot hold a conversation without permanent confrontation. On Fridays, Montes goes to the office of his supervisor and former teacher Lucía Aranda (Norma Aleandro), whom he contacts after a fight they had years ago, when he begins to suffer a midlife crisis, they touch on their sessions issues related to their professional vocation, their maturity, their marriage that begins to crumble, the estrangement of their three children and their feelings towards the patient Marina, who begin to confuse him.

=== Starring ===
- Diego Peretti as Guillermo Montes
- Julieta Cardinali as Marina Generis
- Germán Palacios as Gastón Ramírez
- Ailín Salas as Clara Salinas
- Dolores Fonzi as Ana Irigoyen
- Leonardo Sbaraglia as Martín Pineda
- Norma Aleandro as Lucía Aranda

=== Recurring cast ===
- Federico Luppi as Jorge Ramírez, Gastón Ramírez's father
- Alejandra Flechner as Sabrina Montes, Guillermo Montes wife
- Vera Spinetta as Catalina Montes, Guillermo Montes daughter
- Ignacio Rogers as Camilo Montes, Guillermo Montes son
- Octavio Flesca as Benjamín "Benji" Montes, Guillermo Montes son
- Valeria Lorca as Silvina Salinas, Clara Salinas mother
- Nacho Gadano as Gustavo Salinas, Clara Salinas father

== Second season ==
In the second season the psychoanalysis sessions continue following the same story and plot line. Due to Gastón's suicide, his father Jorge (Federico Luppi) decides to denounce Guillermo for malpractice, so he turns to a lawyer to take charge of his defense. The lawyer, Juliana (Carla Peterson), begins therapy on Monday. On Tuesday, the session involves Ana, Martín and their son Maxi. The first two characters had already participated in the first season. This time the therapy focuses on the son of both, and the maturation of the couple after the divorce. On Wednesdays, Guillermo attends to José (Roberto Carnaghi), an entrepreneur who is forced to face the passage of time and the ecological disaster caused by the company he runs. On Thursdays we meet Valentina (Luisana Lopilato), a student who has to face a terrible disease. On Fridays, Guillermo continues his sessions with Lucía, his therapist and former teacher.

=== Starring ===
- Diego Peretti as Guillermo Montes
- Carla Peterson as Juliana Rosso
- Dolores Fonzi as Ana Irigoyen
- Leonardo Sbaraglia as Martín Pineda
- Gonzalo Slipak as Máximo Pineda
- Roberto Carnaghi as José Rotztein
- Luisana Lopilato as Valentina Guevara
- Norma Aleandro as Lucía Aranda

=== Recurring cast ===
- Federico Luppi as Jorge Ramírez, Gastón Ramírez's father
- Mercedes Morán as Andrea Mendell, Guillermo Montes ex-girlfriend
- Verónica Llinás as Mercedes Guevara, Valentina Guevara's mother
- Alejandra Flechner as Sabrina Montes, Guillermo Montes ex-wife
- Vera Spinetta as Catalina Montes, Guillermo Montes daughter
- Leonora Balcarce as Victoria Rotztein, José Rotztein's daughter

== Third season ==
In this third part, Guillermo Montes' personal life is in crisis, initially for fear of suffering a principle of Parkinson's, so he turns to Laura's office (Julieta Díaz) in search of psychiatric treatment. What at first seems to be a distant and somewhat confrontational relationship between Laura and Guillermo is slowly changing, and over time Guillermo develops feelings of romantic interest in his Laura. On the other hand, new patients will bring new experiences to Guillermo's office. Gabriela (Cecilia Roth) is a 51-year-old actress who suffers sudden forgetfulness and is very concerned about her personal and professional future. Carlos (Darío Grandinetti) is an educated and religious man, from the countryside santafesino, who has lost his wife recently and had to move to his son's house. Julián (Santiago Magariños) is a teenager and son of adoptive parents, with whom he seems not to get along.

=== Starring ===
- Diego Peretti as Guillermo Montes
- Julieta Díaz as Laura Marquez
- Cecilia Roth as Gabriela Girat
- Darío Grandinetti as Carlos
- Santiago Magariños as Julián Angusi

=== Recurring cast ===
- Julieta Zylberberg as Nancy, Carlos daughter in law
- Vera Spinetta as Catalina Montes, Guillermo Montes daughter
- Octavio Flesca as Benjamín "Benji" Montes, Guillermo Montes son
- Boy Olmi as Juanjo, Guillermo's ex-wife boyfriend
- Paula Morales as Cecilia, Guillermo's girlfriend
- Florencia Torrente as Francisca "Frani" Gutiérrez, Gabriela's daughter
- Martín Slipak as Jesús Andrés, Carlos son
- María Onettovas Marisa Angusi, Julián's adoptive mother
- Claudio Rissi as Roberto Angusi, Julián's adoptive father
- Pablo Ini as Sergio, Guillermo's patient
- Paula Sartor as Guillermo's patient with anorexia

== Critics ==
The series had positive reviews of the entire paper and digital press of Argentina. The newspaper Clarínhighlighted her style, considering her an "heiress" of Situación límite (1984) and Atreverse (1990). The newspaper La Nación gave him a "very good" rating (four stars out of five) and praised "the forcefulness with which the characters of the characters involved in the story, the richness of the plot that the talks in the office reveal in which the relations between them are woven, the certainty of the dialogues that give account of these talks and the structure of each episode and the future of the series in general that manages the intrigue in addition to the turns, the emotion and the humor they get the viewer's imagination to become a luxury assistant for that indoor camera and make history come alive, variety and dynamism by transcending the limits of the unity of place that the series supposedly poses. The newspaper Tiempo Argentino highlighted that “in the antipodes of the local productions that appeal to the musical edition to prick the spectator's emotion, here the silence allows to recover the“ noise of real life. After all, this dryness strengthens the dramatic nature of the psychoanalytic scene and, in the viewer, the "feeling" of spying on an event that, of course, is forbidden, although it marked that" the vulnerable point of En terapia It is the collation, which in some episodes reveals incongruities of continuity. The magazinene Noticias de la Semana gave it five stars and directly described it as “an impeccable fiction, very well written and adapted and with anthological performances that raise the level of daily fiction well above usual standards“. The newspaper Página/12 marked that “returning to the most basic tools is a novelty worth celebrating”, and this is “the key to the appeal of En terapia, highlighting the organization of the series in independent sessions that can be followed freely as a «novelty that the series introduces on Argentine TV, in addition to giving it a practical sense, gives fiction a necessary flexibility in times of broad access to cultural consumption”. As a result of their relative popularity particularly in middle class sectors several media spoke about En terapia from its sections of psychology and society. The Revista Ñ treated the issue of ethical problems of the discipline with the dignity of the patient, and the newspaper La Nación consulted several psychoanalysts about the way in which the series had emerged as a subject for comparison by several of their patients, and their opinion on the likelihood of the sessions shown.

== Awards and nominations ==
Year	Award	Category	Nominees	Result
2012	Premios Nuevas Miradas en la Televisión	Fiction series	En terapia	Nominated
2012	Tato Awards	Program of the year	En terapia	Nominated
2012	Tato Awards	Daily fiction	En terapia	Nominated
2012	Tato Awards	Fiction production	En terapia	Nominated
2012	Tato Awards	Best actor in daily fiction	Germán Palacios	Nominated
2012	Tato Awards	Best actor in daily fiction	Diego Peretti	Nominated
2012	Tato Awards	Best actor in daily fiction	Leonardo Sbaraglia	Nominated
2012	Tato Awards	Best actress in daily fiction	Norma Aleandro	Nominated
2012	Tato Awards	Best actress in daily fiction	Julieta Cardinali	Nominated
2012	Tato Awards	Best actress in daily fiction	Dolores Fonzi	Nominated
2012	Tato Awards	Best art and fiction image	Miguel Abal and Tomás Garrahan	Nominated
2013	Martín Fierro Awards	Best miniseries	En terapia	Winner
2013	Martín Fierro Awards	Best miniseries actor	Diego Peretti	Nominated
2013	Martín Fierro Awards	Best Supporting Actor	Leonardo Sbaraglia	Winner
2013	Martín Fierro Awards	Best Supporting Actress	Norma Aleandro	Nominated
2013	Martín Fierro Awards	Revelation Artist	Ailín Salas	Nominated
2013	Martín Fierro Awards	Best author	Esther Feldman and Alejandro Maci	Nominated
2013	Tato Awards	Daily fiction	En terapia	Nominated
2013	Tato Awards	Fiction address	Alejandro Maci	Nominated
2013	Tato Awards	Leading actor in drama	Diego Peretti	Nominated
2013	Tato Awards	Lead actress in drama	Norma Aleandro	Winner
2013	Tato Awards	Lead actress in drama	Luisana Lopilato	Nominated
2013	Tato Awards	Fiction script	Esther Feldman and Alejandro Maci	Winner
2013	Tato Awards	Art Direction in Fiction	En terapia	Nominated
2013	Tato Awards	Fiction Edition	En terapia	Winner
2013	Tato Awards	Casting in fiction	En terapia	Nominated
2014	2013 Martín Fierro Awards	Best miniseries	En terapia	Winner
2014	2013 Martín Fierro Awards	Best director	Alejandro Maci	Nominated
2014	2013 Martín Fierro Awards	Best miniseries actor	Diego Peretti	Winner
2014	2013 Martín Fierro Awards	Best Supporting Actor	Roberto Carnaghi	Winner
2014	2013 Martín Fierro Awards	Best Supporting Actress	Norma Aleandro	Nominated
2014	2013 Martín Fierro Awards	Best Supporting Actress	Luisana Lopilato	Nominated
2014	2013 Martín Fierro Awards	Best author	Esther Feldman and Alejandro Maci	Nominated
2014	2013 Martín Fierro Awards	Revelation Artist	Gonzalo Slipak	Nominated
2015	Martín Fierro Awards	Best miniseries	En terapia	Nominated
2015	Martín Fierro Awards	Best miniseries actor	Diego Peretti	Winner
2015	Martín Fierro Awards	Best Supporting Actor	Darío Grandinetti	Nominated
2015	Martín Fierro Awards	Best Supporting Actress	Julieta Díaz	Winner
2015	Martín Fierro Awards	Revelation Artist	Santiago Magariños	Nominated
