= Alejandro Fantino =

Argentine TV host (born 1971)

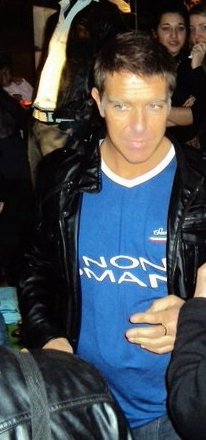
- Born: 26 September 1971 (age 55); Santa Fe, Argentina
- Occupations: Radio and TV host
- Years active: 1993–present
- Spouse: Miriam Lanzoni (m. 2006, divorced) Constanza "Coni" Mosqueira (m. 2022)
- Children: 1

Alejandro Fantino (born 26 September 1971) is an Argentine radio and TV host.

He was born in San Vicente, a small village in Castellanos, Santa Fe Province, and is an only child. He studied in the Liceo Militar General Belgrano. He began living in Buenos Aires age 18, working in a garden centre and as a tennis teacher. He married Miriam Lanzoni, an Argentinian actress, in 2006, and they divorced in 2016. He married Constanza "Coni" Mosqueira in 2022 and they had a son in 2024.

== Career ==
He became a radio presenter in 1992, replacing Héctor Caldiero in Radio Mitre, covering Club Atlético Boca Juniors in El show de Boca, where he worked till 2002.

He currently hosts the streaming and radio show Neura Media, in which he has interviewed and hosted Argentine president Javier Milei several times.

== Television ==
=== TyC Sports ===
- Fuera de juego (1996)
- Club Social y Deportivo (1997–1998)
- Código F (1999–2000)
- Mar de fondo (1999–2005)

=== eltrece ===
- La barra de la tele (1998)
- Por más (1999–2000)
- Los Osos (2002)
- Por amor o por dinero (2024)

=== América TV ===
- Gol por gol (2002)
- Fantino con todo (2003)
- TVO (2005–2006)
- Fuga a la medianoche (2006)
- Fuga a la noche (2006–2007)
- Tiempo límite Fan (2007)
- Tiempo límite ATP (2007)
- SDF (2009–2013)
- Animales sueltos (2009–2019, 2022)
- Víndica (2011)
- Animales sueltos: Clásico (2016–2017)
- Fantino a la tarde (2020–2021)
- Intratables (2021–2022)

=== elnueve ===
- Bendita (2023)
- La última cena (2023)

=== ESPN ===
- ESPN estudio (2006)
- ESPN FC (2020–2021)
- ESPN show (2020–2022)

=== Fox Life ===
- Escuela para maridos (2015)

=== Fox Channel ===
- Talento FOX (2018)

== Awards ==
- 2013 Martín Fierro Awards
  - Best male TV host
