= Pedro Brieger =

Argentine journalist and sociologist

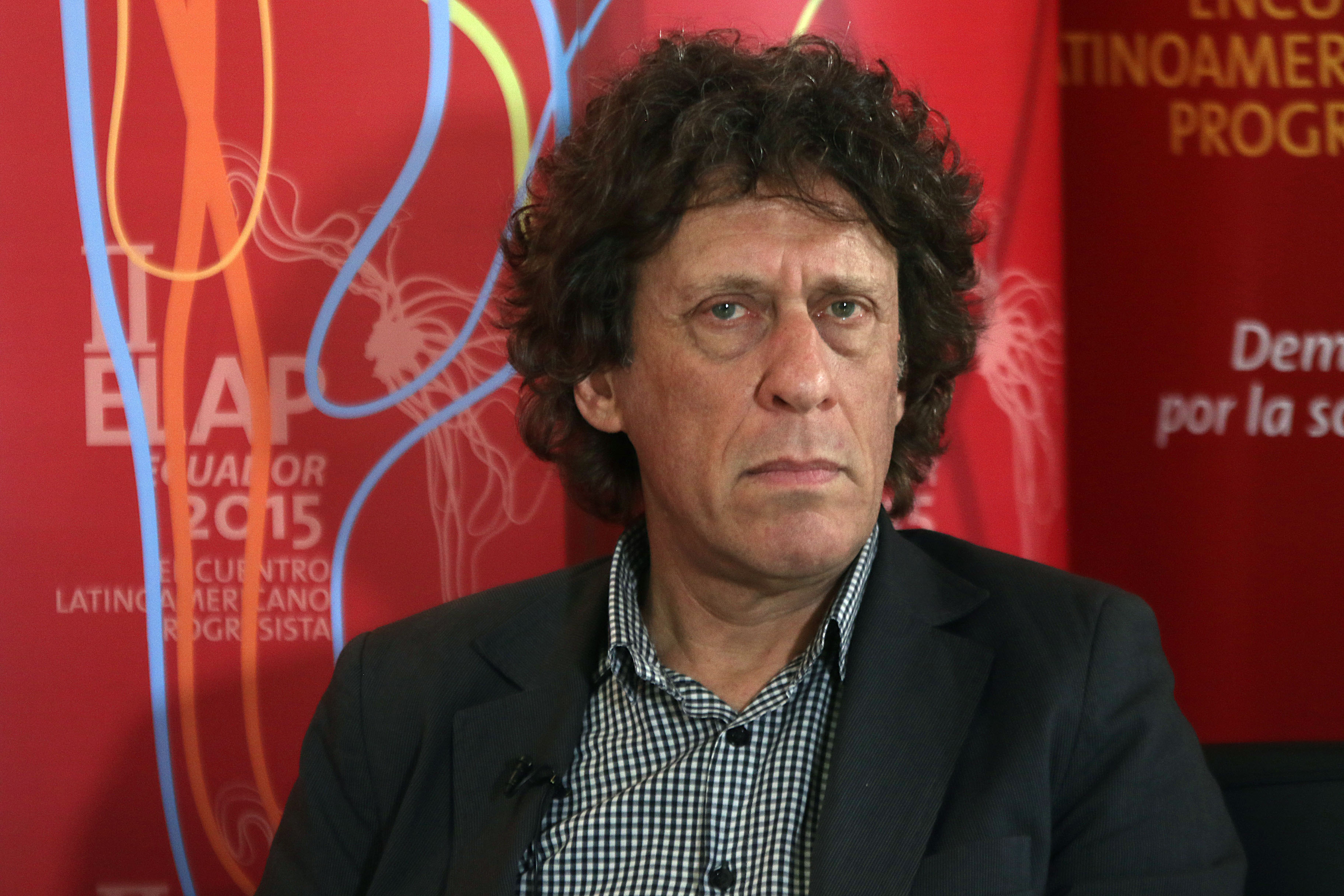
- Born: November 5, 1955 (age 70); Buenos Aires, Argentina
- Occupations: Journalist and sociologist
- Known for: Chair of Sociology in Middle East in the University of Buenos Aires

Pedro Rubén Brieger (born 5 November 1955, Buenos Aires, Argentina) is an Argentine journalist and sociologist. He is a professor of Middle East Sociology at the University of Buenos Aires Faculty of Social Sciences. He worked for different newspapers, including Clarín, El Cronista, La Nación, Página/12, Perfil and Miami Herald; and magazines like Noticias, Tres Puntos, Revista Veintitrés and Le Monde diplomatique.

In August 2006 he reported that Canal Siete, the channel where his program was being broadcast, had received pressure from the Israeli ambassador Rafael Eldad, because of its coverage of the military conflict in Middle East. Although the diplomat denied these statements, the Union Press Workers of Buenos Aires issued a statement where they expressed solidarity with Brieger, considering "unacceptable the expressions of the Ambassador Eldad".

In August 2009 he received the Martín Fierro Award as the best male journalistic labour on TV, during 2008. In May 2010 he received again the same prize.

In 2024, a series of sexual harassment complaints led to the interruption of several professional activities. Brieger stopped appearing on the air on the C5N channel, was removed from Radio La Red where he had been a columnist for 15 years, and an evaluation process was initiated at the University of Buenos Aires (UBA). In July of the same year, a report presented a total of 19 harassment complaints.

== Books ==
- Whither Nicaragua? (1989)
- The last days of the USSR - Boris Yeltsin vs. Gorbachev (1991)
- Middle East and the Gulf War (1991)
- Holy War or Political Struggle? Interviews and discussion on Islam (1996)
- War and globalization after September 11" In Global World "Global War? The dilemmas of globalization. (2002)
- The lost decade to decade of neoliberal myth. In The Economic and financial globalization. Its impact on Latin America. (2002)
- The assemblies of neighbors, a new experience in politics. In Argentina, issues and roots of a society in crisis" (Paris 2003)
- What's Al Qaeda? (2006)
- One hundred questions and answers about the Israeli-Palestinian conflict (2010)
- What's Al Qaeda? (2010)

== Awards ==
=== Nominations ===
- 2013 Martín Fierro Awards
  - Best male journalist

== Sexual Harassment Allegations ==
In June 2024, around 20 women accused Brieger of alleged sexual harassment. Among the accusers are a former student of the Journalism program at the Faculty of Law and a secretary from the University of Belgrano, academics, a neighbor, students, and several professional journalists.

The first known case reportedly occurred in 1994 when Brieger harassed a secretary at the University of Belgrano. At that time, she reported him to the dean and the director of the journalism program, who requested Brieger's resignation to avoid scandal.

Among the victims of the harassment, which included exhibitionism and masturbation in front of women, are Agustina Kämpfer (TV host and former partner of Amado Boudou), Cecilia Guardatti (correspondent for Télam in Spain), Leticia Martínez (journalist), Marcela Perelman (director of the Center for Legal and Social Studies), and Julia Kolodny (gender columnist on Radio 10), who was forced to resign from her job due to Brieger's harassment and said:

We were able to put words to it after many years of silence. Many of us tried to speak out at the time in our workplaces and were not heard in this way.

On July 2, 2024, the group of women Periodistas Argentinas presented, at a press conference in the Argentine Senate, a report with testimonies from 19 women journalists who accused Brieger of sexual harassment. Gisela Busaniche (journalist for Telefe Noticias) later joined the group. Many of the victims had to abandon their studies or jobs due to the harassment.
