= Talento FOX =

- Genre: Reality competition
- Directed by: Martin Kweller
- Presented by: Alejandro Fantino
- Judges: Diego Torres; Lali Espósito; Wisin
- Country of origin: Argentina
- Original language: Spanish
- No. of seasons: 1
- No. of episodes: 13

Production
- Producer: Raul Slonimsky
- Production location: Fox Toma 1, Buenos Aires
- Running time: 47–55 minutes
- Production companies: Fox Networks Group Latin America; Kuarzo Entertainment Argentina

Original release
- Network: FOX
- Release: August 22 – November 22, 2018

Talento FOX is a singing competition television series broadcast on FOX. It premiered on August 22, 2018 and aims to find currently unsigned singing talent from all over Latin America (professional and amateur) contested by aspiring singers, drawn from public auditions. The competition not only looks for talent, but it also aims to overcome contestants' past personal experiences and fears. The winner receives record deal with Sony Music Argentina to record a studio album, and becomes exclusive artist of Fox Latin America.

The series employs a panel of three judges or "directors" who guide the artists' performances. Each director is concerned with a particular aspect: Diego Torres with vocal technique and perfectioning, Lali Espósito with body expression and stage performance, and Wisin with artistic projection. The series is hosted by Alejandro Fantino.

On November 21, 2018, Francisco Vázquez was crowned winner of Talento Fox.

== Selection process and format ==
The competition begins with the "Selection Phase." The directors watch a video of each contestant introducing themselves and narrating their life stories before performing. Once the video finishes, the contestants start their performances from inside a capsule inside the stage as to allow the directors to focus only on the voice. They have one minute to impress the directors and encourage them to press their button or "disc". To officially enter the competition or the "Talento FOX factory", the contestant needs the approval of the three directors. With only two directors pressing their buttons, the capsule is lifted up and the stage forms stairs from which the contestant descends to face the audience. If this happens, the contestant has the opportunity to convince the lasting director to press their button. However, if any or only one director press their buttons in the one-minute span time, they are denied any opportunity to enter the factory.

The twenty-five contestants eventually selected are trained in the "Factory", where they work with professionals to improve their singing, dancing and performing skills. The "Transphormation Phase" consists of four episodes in which six or seven contestants perform a song individually. At the end of the episode, the directors select three contestants to advance to the next phase.

The twelve remaining contestants are arranged in duets to compete in the "Competition Phase", which consists of two episodes. In each one, three duets (six contestants) perform a song, and the judges chooses the best duet to advance to the next phase. The four remaining contestants then perform a different song, and the directors now chose only two of them, from the same or from different duets. The first chosen duet get to perform at the end of the episode.

== Selection Phase ==
Color key

✔	Director pressed their button during the contestant's performance
✔	Director pressed their button after the contestant's performance
	Artist eliminated with at least one director not pressing their button

=== Episode 1 (Aug. 22) ===
Order	Artist	Age	Homecountry	Song	Director's choices			Result
Order	Artist	Age	Homecountry	Song	Diego	Lali	Wisin	Result
1	Ju Outeyral	18	Argentina	"I'm Yours"	✔	✔	✔	Chosen
2	Daniela Posada	26	Colombia	"Somos Uno"	✔	✔	✔	Chosen
3	Sofia Pignani	20	Argentina	"¡Corre!"	✔	✔	✔	Chosen
4	Naharaí Bautista Alvarado	23	Mexico	"’O sole mio"	✔	✔	✔	Chosen
5	Mauro Sabugal	N/A	Argentina	"Atado a tu amor"	—	—	—	Not chosen
6	Nicolas Celone	21	Argentina	"Sin Principio Ni Final"	—	—	—	Not chosen
7	Lucas Edi	18	Argentina	"Perfect"	✔	✔	✔	Chosen
8	Pâmela Gonçalves	31	Brazil	"Desde Esa Noche"	—	—	—	Not chosen
9	Hernán Danza	33	Argentina	"Seré"	✔	✔	—	Not chosen
						✔	✔	Chosen

=== Episode 2 (Aug. 29) ===
Order	Artist	Age	Homecountry	Song	Director's choices			Result
Order	Artist	Age	Homecountry	Song	Diego	Lali	Wisin	Result
1	Florencia Álvarez	22	Argentina	"Hero"	✔	✔	✔	Chosen
2	Francisco Vázquez	21	Argentina	"Versace on the Floor"	✔	✔	✔	Chosen
3	Félix Gordillo	23	Mexico	"Me Dediqué a Perderte"	✔	✔	✔	Chosen
4	Lucas Kneetman	25	Argentina	"Persiana Americana"	—	—	—	Not chosen
5	Vanesa Grandinetti	27	Argentina	"Someone like You"	✔	✔	✔	Chosen
6	Marcelo Santillán	39	Argentina	"Sobreviviendo"	✔	✔	✔	Chosen
7	Federico Muñoz	23	Argentina	"No Me Doy por Vencido"	✔	✔	✔	Chosen
8	Kelly Bareño	24	Colombia	"Labios Compartidos"	—	—	—	Not chosen
9	Araceli Encinas	21	Argentina	"Que nadie sepa mi sufrir"	✔	✔	✔	Chosen

=== Episode 3 (Sep. 5) ===
Order	Artist	Age	Homecountry	Song	Director's choices			Result
Order	Artist	Age	Homecountry	Song	Diego	Lali	Wisin	Result
1	Abril Affre	18	Argentina	"I Will Always Love You"	✔	✔	✔	Chosen
2	Johanna Gomez	34	Colombia	"Si tú no estás aqui"	✔	✔	—	Not chosen
3	Diego Carbajal	48	Argentina	"What a Wonderful World"	✔	✔	✔	Chosen
4	Micaela Albanese	19	Argentina	"Hello"	✔	✔	✔	Chosen
5	Walter Amor	20	Uruguay	"Entra En Mi Vida"	—	—	—	Not chosen
6	Emanuel Gil	18	Argentina	"A Puro Dolor"	✔	✔	✔	Chosen
7	Juan Caruso	19	Argentina	"Puente"	✔	✔	✔	Chosen
8	Fernanda Jacinto Forero	24	Colombia	"Sin Miedo a Nada"	✔	✔	✔	Chosen
9	William Álvarez	21	Argentina	"Lloviendo Estrellas"	✔	✔	✔	Chosen
10	Juan Manuel Garza	40	Mexico	"A Dios le Pido"	✔	✔	—	Not chosen
11	Camila Torres	22	Argentina	"Rosas"	—	—	—	Not chosen

=== Episode 4 (Sep. 12) ===
Order	Artist	Age	Homecountry	Song	Director's choices			Result
Order	Artist	Age	Homecountry	Song	Diego	Lali	Wisin	Result
1	Agustín Suero	26	Argentina	"Get Up, Stand Up"	✔	✔	✔	Chosen
2	Carla Romañuk	44	Uruguay	"Don't Know Why"	✔	✔	✔	Chosen
3	Clemens Brentano	27	Brazil	"El Perdón"	—	—	—	Not chosen
4	Mariana Pereyra	26	Argentina	"No me enseñaste"	✔	✔	✔	Chosen
5	Tomás Descalzo	23	Argentina	"Tu Recuerdo"	—	—	—	Not chosen
6	Vanesa Rodriguez	22	Argentina	"Love Shack"	✔	✔	✔	Chosen
7	Camila Asselborn	19	Argentina	"Don't Speak"	✔	—	✔	Not chosen
8	Benjamín Depasquali	18	Argentina	"Can't Stop the Feeling!"	✔	✔	✔	Chosen
9	Moisés Mercado	30	Colombia	"Fruta Fresca"	—	—	—	Not chosen

== Transformation Phase ==
Color key:

Contestant was chosen by the judges to advanced to the next stage
Contestant was eliminated

=== Episode 5 (Sep. 26) ===
Order	Contestant	Song	Result
1	Ju Oteyral	"La Llave"	Eliminated
2	Francisco Vázquez	"Somewhere Only We Know"	Advanced
3	Micaela Albanese	"Bad Romance"	Advanced
4	Diego Carabajal	"She"	Eliminated
5	Felix Gordillo	"Si No Te Hubieras Ido"	Eliminated
6	Araceli Encinas	"Amores Extraños"	Advanced

=== Episode 6 (Oct. 3) ===
Order	Contestant	Song	Result
1	Naharai Alvarado	"I Will Survive"	Advanced
2	William Álvarez	"Disparo al Corazón"	Eliminated
3	Daniela Posadas	"Nada Fue Un Error"	Eliminated
4	Abril Ezcurra	"Sweet Child o' Mine"	Advanced
5	Juan Caruso	"Afinidad"	Advanced
6	Federico Muñoz	"Es Por Ti"	Eliminated

=== Episode 7 (Oct. 10) ===
Order	Contestant	Song	Result
1	Benjamín Depasquali	"Bye Bye Bye"	Advanced
2	Carla Romañuk	"Si tú no estás aqui"	Eliminated
3	Lucas Edi	"Haven't Met You Yet"	Advanced
4	Mariana Pereyra	"Corazón Partío"	Eliminated
5	Fernanda Forero	"Sabor a Mí"	Eliminated
6	Marcelo Santillán	"Algo Contigo"	Eliminated
7	Vanesa Rodriguez	"Firework"	Advanced

=== Episode 8 (Oct. 17) ===
Order	Contestant	Song	Result
1	Florencia Álvarez	"Todo Cambia"	Advanced
2	Agustín Suero	"Atrévete-te-te"	Advanced
3	Vanesa Grandinetti	"Ego"	Eliminated
4	Sofía Pignani	"Without You"	Eliminated
5	Abril Affre	"Your Song"	Advanced
6	Emanuel Gil	"Por Amarte Así"	Eliminated

== Competition Phase: Duets ==
Color key:

Contestant was chosen by the judges to advanced to the next stage after the first round
Contestant was chosen by the judges to advanced to the next stage after the second round
Contestant was eliminated

=== Episode 9 (Oct. 24) ===
Contestant	Order	Song	Order	Song	Result
Florencia Álvarez	1	"Corazón"	—N/a		Advanced
Benjamín Depasquali	1	"Corazón"	—N/a		Advanced
Araceli Encinas	2	"Cake by the Ocean"	5	"Desde Esa Noche"	Advanced
Lucas Edi	2	"Cake by the Ocean"	5	"Desde Esa Noche"	Advanced
-	3	"Tu Recuerdo"	4	"Tu Sin Mí"	Eliminated
Juan Caruzo	3	"Tu Recuerdo"	4	"Tu Sin Mí"	Eliminated

=== Episode 10 (Oct. 31) ===
Contestant	Order	Song	Order	Song	Result
Micaela Albanese	1	"Valerie"	—N/a		Advanced
Agustín Suero	1	"Valerie"	—N/a		Advanced
Naharai Alvarado	2	"La Bikina"	5	"Fantasmas"	Eliminated
Vanesa Rodriguez	2	"La Bikina"	5	"Fantasmas"	Eliminated
Abril Affre	3	"Crimen"	4	"Fotografía"	Advanced
Francisco Vázquez	3	"Crimen"	4	"Fotografía"	Advanced

== Quarter-finals ==
=== Episode 11 (Nov. 7) ===
Color key

The contestant was chosen by Diego to join her team
The contestant was chosen by Lali to join her team
The contestant was chosen by Wisin to join her team
The contestant was not chosen by any director and thus, eliminated

Order	Contestant	Song	Result
1	Benjamín Depasaquali	"Happy"	Advanced
2	Florencia Álvarez	"Yo Vengo a Ofrecer Mi Corazón"	Advanced
3	Francisco Vazquez	"Mr. Brightside"	Advanced
4	Araceli Encinas	"Tan Enamorados"	Eliminated
5	Lucas Edi	"Wonderwall"	Advanced
6	Agustín Suero	"Reggaetón Lento (Bailemos)"	Eliminated
7	Micaela Albanese	"Creep"	Advanced
8	Abril Affre	"Chandelier"	Advanced

== Semifinals ==
Color key:

Contestant was chosen by the judges to advanced to the finals
Contestant was eliminated

=== Episode 12 (Nov. 14) ===
Order	Contestant	Song	Result
1	Francisco Vázquez	"Grace Kelly"	Advanced
2	Abril Affre	"Fever"	Advanced
3	Lucas Edi	"El Perdón"	Eliminated
4	Mucaela Albanese	"Roxanne"	Eliminated
5	Benjamín Depasquali	"That's What I Like"	Advanced
6	Florencia Álvarez	"Te Extraño, Te Olvido, Te Amo"	Eliminated

== Finale ==
Color key:

Contestant was a runner up of Talento FOX
Contestant was winner of Talento Fox

=== Episode 13 (Nov. 21) ===
Contestant	Order	Song in Spanish	Order	Song in English	Result
Benjamín Depasquali	1	"Te Vi Venir"	4	"...Baby One More Time"	Runner-up
Abril Affre	5	"¡Corre!"	2	"Roar"	Runner-up
Francisco Vázquez	3	"Seguir Viviendo sin Tu Amor"	6	"Moves like Jagger"	Winner

== Non-competition performances ==
List of non-competition performances
Episode	Performer(s)	Song(s)
1	Diego Torres, Lali and Wisin	"Iguales"
2	Diego Torres and Carlos Vives	"Un Poquito"
3	Anitta and Lali	"Downtown", "100 Grados"
4	Wisin	"Me niego", "Escápate Conmigo", "Vacaciones"
5	CNCO	"Mamita", "Hey DJ"
6	Julieta Venegas	"Buenos Aires Bomba"
7	Carlos Rivera	"Recuérdame"
8	Carlos Vives	"Hoy Tengo Tiempo (Pinta Sensual)"
9	Florencia Álvarez and Benjamín Depasquali	"Dónde está el Amor"
9	Anitta	"Indecente"
10	Agustín Suero and Micaela Albanese	"Entra En Mi Vida"
10	Miranda!	"743"
11	Nahuel Pennisi	"Ser Feliz", "Somos"
12	Lali	"Besarte Mucho"
13	Top 6 contestants	"Iguales"

== Reception ==
Episode		Original airdate	Production	Time slot (AR)	Viewers (in millions)	Adults (18–49)		Source
Episode		Original airdate	Production	Time slot (AR)	Viewers (in millions)	Rating	Share	Source
1	"Etapa Selección: Parte 1"	August 22, 2018	S01E01	Wednesday 9:45 p.m.	0.28	2.03	3.7	
