= Andrea Politti =

Argentine actress and television host

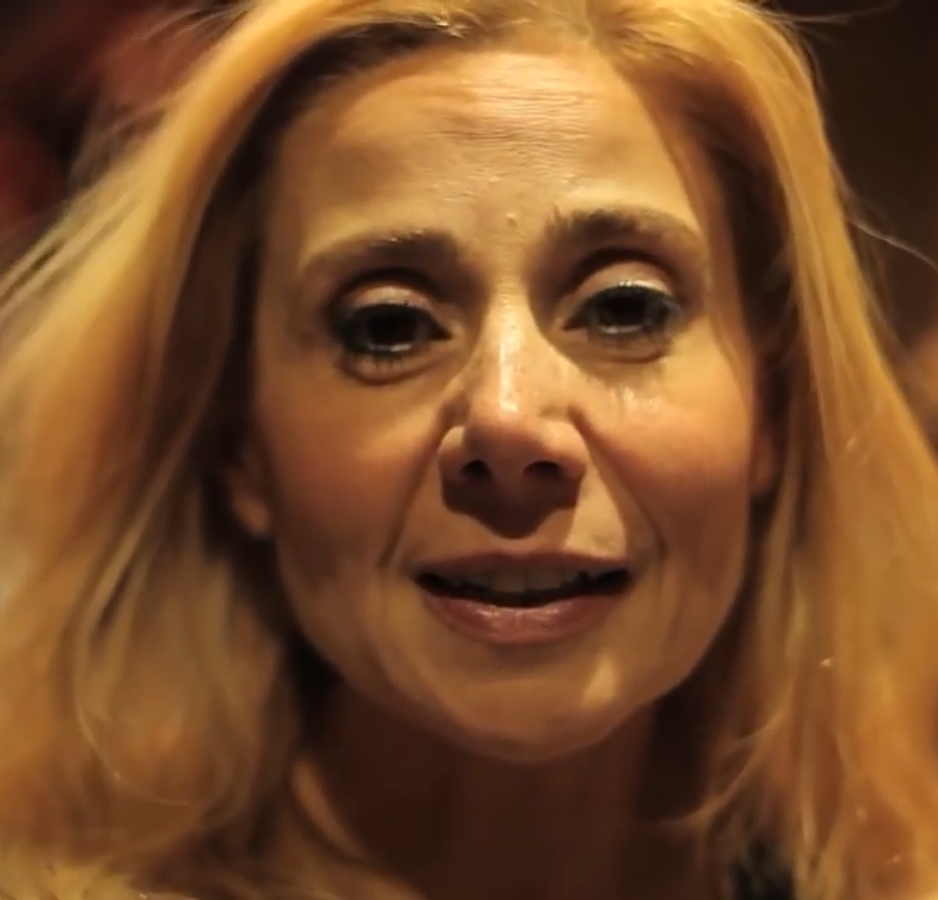
- Born: 4 January 1964 (age 62)
- Occupation: Actress
- Parent: Luis Politti

Andrea Politti is an Argentine actress and TV host, born 4 January 1964.

== Awards ==
- 2013 Martín Fierro Awards
  - Best female TV host
