= Animales Sueltos =

Argentine talk show

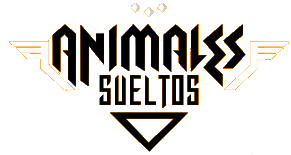

Animales sueltos (Spanish: Loose animals) is an Argentine television talk show. It is hosted by Alejandro Fantino and aired by América TV since 2009.

== Awards ==
- 2013 Tato Awards for best panelist (Coco Sily)
- 2013 Martín Fierro Awards: Best male television host
- 2015 Martín Fierro Awards
  - Best general interest program
