= Yayo Guridi =

Argentine actor and comedian

- Born: José Carlos Guridi; November 6, 1965 (age 60); Villa María, Córdoba, Argentina
- Occupations: Actor, comedian
- Years active: 1995–present

Yayo Guridi (born November 6, 1965, in Villa María, Argentina), born José Carlos Guridi, is an Argentine actor and comedian.

== Biography ==
José Carlos Guridi was born and raised in Villa María. He studied and graduated in economics at the National University of Córdoba and would be devoted to that profession for a short time. He was also an adviser to the Ministry of Economy.

After performing concerts and presentations for years in cafés and pubs, his rise to fame came in 1995 when he joined the comedy show Videomatch. In that program, he gave mainly performed sketches including high content of absurd, obscene, vulgar and off-color humor. Also conduct a fake Top Ten, entitled "Top Forry" where would perform parodies of music videos from artists like Nino Bravo, The Rolling Stones, Lionel Richie, Bee Gees, Bersuit Vergarabat, among others.

From 2008 to 2015 he appeared as part of the cast of Sin codificar, a TV show where the humour was somewhat less vulgar and more innocent. He is left-handed.

== Filmography ==
=== Television ===
Year	Program	Channel
1995-2004	Videomatch	Telefé
1998	Los Rodríguez	Telefé
2005	Aunque usted no lo viera	Telefé
2005-2006	Buenos días, Argentina	Telefé
2006	El código Rodríguez	Telefé
2007	Bien tarde	Telefé
2008	El último vuelo del día	America TV
2008	Sin codificar	America TV
2009	Showmatch	Canal 13
2010	Diario del Mundial	Telefé
2011	Los únicos	Canal 13
2012	Mi problema con las mujeres	Telefé
2013–2015	Peligro sin codificar	Telefé
2014	Tu cara me suena	Telefé
2016	Educando a Nina	Telefé
2026	Gutiérrez is mai neim	Disney+

=== Movies ===
Year	Title
2006	Bañeros 3: Todopoderosos
2011	Fase 7

== Awards ==
Year	Award	Category	Work	Result
2011	Martín Fierro Awards	Best Labor Humorous	Sin codificar	Nominated
2012	Premios Carlos	best Unipersonal	Yayo y qué?...Tomá!	Won
2012	Martín Fierro Awards	Best Labor Humorous	Peligro sin codificar	Nominated
2013	Premios Tato	Comic work	Peligro sin codificar	Nominated
2013	Martín Fierro Awards	Best Labor Humorous	Peligro sin codificar	Nominated
