= Tu cara me suena (Argentine TV series) =

- Presented by: Marley Wiebe
- Judges: Current; Cacho Castaña; Elizabeth Vernacci; Enrique Pinti; Former; Joaquin Galán; Ale Sergi
- Country of origin: Argentina
- Original language: Spanish
- No. of seasons: 3

Production
- Executive producers: Pablo Graziano; Mona Dugatkin
- Production location: Buenos Aires
- Running time: 120 mins. (inc. adverts)

Original release
- Network: Telefe
- Release: 23 September 2013 – 23 December 2015

Related
- Your Face Sounds Familiar

Tu cara me suena is an Argentine talent show based on the Spanish series of the same name. The show began airing on 23 September 2013 on Telefe and its first season ended on 18 December 2013. The show is presented by Marley Wiebe, whilst the judging panel is composed by Cacho Castaña, Elizabeth Vernacci and Enrique Pinti, with Joaquín Galán and Ale Sergi being former judges.

The show involves celebrities (actors, television personalities, comedians) portraying various iconic singers each week to win AR$20,000 for their chosen charity. The winner of the series receives the AR$100,000 grand prize for her/his charity.

On 18 December 2013, actress and singer Laura Esquivel was announced as the first winner. She also won Week 2 and 3 of the competition (as Whitney Houston, and Michael Jackson, respectively) collecting AR$20,000 for each of those weeks. In total, she won AR$140,000 for her chosen charity over the 13 weeks.

== Format ==
The show challenges celebrities to perform as different iconic music artists every week, which are chosen by the show's "Randomiser". They are then judged by a panel of celebrity judges. During the series, the celebrities are trained by vocal coach Miguel Ángel Cherutti.

Each celebrity becomes transformed into a different singer each week, and performs an iconic song and dance routine well known by that particular singer. The 'randomiser' can choose any older or younger artist available in the machine, or even a singer of the opposite sex, or a deceased singer.

=== Voting ===
The contestants receive points from the judges based on their singing and dance routines, as well as voted from the other competitors.

Every judge scales the competitors from 4 to 11 (in the first season) or 4 to 12 (in the second season), with each competitor in a different position of the scale. The competitor every judge considers as the best of the week will be in the position with 11/12 points, while the worst will be in the position with 4 points. Then, the celebrities count with 5 points to give to their fellow competitor: in season one, they had to give 5 points to a single competitor. In season two, they had to split their 5 points, giving 3 to one, and 2 to another one, which means every celebrity can give points to two other celebrities. The total score of each contestant is then counted by summing the points from judges and the others competitors' votes.

Whoever is at the top of the leaderboard at the end of the each show, after the combination of the judges' and the other competitors' votes, receives a AR$20,000 cash prize for a charity of their choice and a further AR$100,000 grand prize for the "series champion" in the final week.

== Judges ==
The panel of judges for the first season consisted of singer from the famous duet Pimpinela, Joaquin Galán, journalist Elizabeth Vernacci and singer Cacho Castaña. In the middle of the season, due to health problems, Castaña left the panel, and Miranda! frontman Ale Sergi, who served as a guest judge a previous week, entered in his place and lasted for the rest of the season. Before Sergi, Castaña was replaced by the vocal coach of the show, Miguel Ángel Cherutti.

In season two, Castaña returned to the panel of judges, as well as Vernacci. Galán did not return. The new judge was the big actor, Enrique Pinti.

== Presenters ==
The presenter of the show is Marley Wiebe, famous for presenting big shows like Operación Triunfo, Celebrity Splash! and the Argentine version of The Voice, La Voz... Argentina.

== Series overview: results ==
Season	Premiere date	Finale date	Number of celebrities	Number of weeks	Honour places		
Season	Premiere date	Finale date	Number of celebrities	Number of weeks	Winner	Second place	Third place
1	23 September 2013	18 December 2013	8	13	Laura Esquivel	Martín "Campi" Campilongo	Lucía Galán
2	16 April 2014	21 December 2014	10	35	Ángela Torres	Fernando Dente	Florencia Peña

=== Season 1 (2013) ===
23 September to 18 December 2013, in order of elimination. Eight celebrities competed during thirteen weeks of competition.

Celebrity	Occupation	Result
Rocío Guirao Díaz	Fashion model	8th – Week 12
Jey Mammon	Comedian	7th – Week 12
Pablo Granados	Comedian and singer	6th – Week 13
Benjamin Amadeo	Actor	5th – Week 13
Carmen Barbieri	Former vedette and director	4th – Week 13
Lucía Galán	Professional singer	Third place
Martín "Campi" Campilongo	Comedian and actor	Runner up
Laura Esquivel	Actress and singer	Series winner

=== Season 2 (2014) ===
Season 2 premiered on 16 April 2014. Ten celebrities competed for this season. Laura Esquivel (last season winner) and Jey Mammon (last season contestant) are competing this season as a duet.

Celebrity	Occupation / known for	Status
Angela Torres	Singer and actress	Winner
Augusto Schuster	Chilean singer and actor	Participating
Coki Ramírez	Singer-songwriter	7th
Florencia Peña	Actress & comedian	3rd
Georgina Barbarossa	Actress	8th
Hernán Drago	Fashion male model	Participating
Jey Mammon	Comedian	4th
Laura Esquivel	Former Patito Feo actress & singer	4th
Miguel Ángel Rodríguez	Actor	6th
Pichu Straneo	Sin Codificar comedian	5th

== Awards and nominations ==
Year	Award	Nominee	Category	Result
2013	Tato Awards	Tu Cara me Suena	Big Show	Won
2013	Tato Awards	Tu Cara me Suena	Direction in Non Fiction	Nominated
2013	Tato Awards	Tu Cara me Suena	Lightning in Non Fiction	Nominated
2013	Tato Awards	Tu Cara me Suena	Scenery in Non Fiction	Won
2013	Tato Awards	Tu Cara me Suena	Edition in Non Fiction	Nominated
2013	Tato Awards	Tu Cara me Suena	Production in Non Fiction	Nominated
2013	Tato Awards	Marley Wiebe	Best Presenter	Won
2014	Martín Fierro Awards	Tu Cara me Suena	Best TV production	Won
