= Facundo Pastor =

Argentine radio host (born 1979)

Facundo Pastor (born May 29, 1979 in Buenos Aires) is an Argentine radio host.

== Awards ==
- 2013 Martín Fierro Awards: Best male journalist.
