= Dyango =

Spanish musician (born 1940)

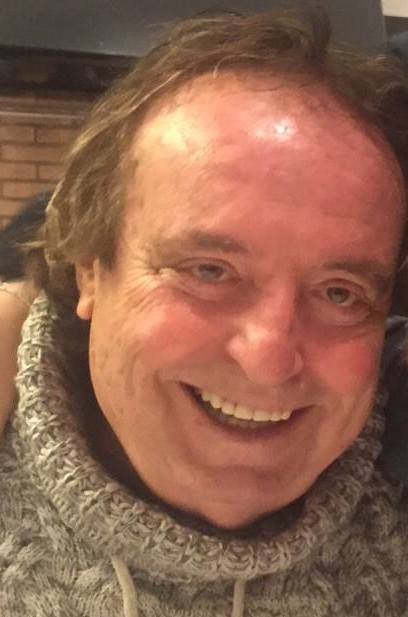

Background information
- Born: José Gómez Romero; March 5, 1940 (age 86); Barcelona, Spain
- Genres: Canción melódica, Balada, Bolero, Tango
- Occupations: Singer, songwriter
- Instruments: Vocals and fiddle
- Years active: 1965 – 2014; 2016–2017

José Gómez Romero, artistically known as Dyango (born March 5, 1940), nicknamed "The Voice of Love", is a Spanish musician and singer of romantic music. He is widely regarded as one of the most romantic Spanish singers, and one of the best performers on the international level. He has sold over 20 million albums worldwide.

Dyango is one of the most popular and most respected singers and one of the most romantic voices in Latin America and Spain. His name is due to the Romani (Gypsy) guitarist Django Reinhardt. Two of his sons, Marcos Llunas and Jordi, are also singers.

== Early years ==
Dyango was born on March 5, 1940, in Barcelona, but was inscribed by his father on May 8, and thus appears as his date of birth in official documents. José Gómez Romero adopted Dyango as a stage name (taken from the guitarist of jazz gypsy Django Reinhardt), by which he is known and debuted at the Duero Song Festival (1965). In his personal life, the artist is married and is the father of four children, two of whom are singers Marcos Llunas and Jordi.

In 1969 he published his first album that bears his name and the following year he traveled to Argentina where he starred alongside Ginamaría Hidalgo in the film El Mundo es de los jóvenes, while editing an album with the same name. This step would open the door to the Latin American market.

Discographically he started in Zafiro and in 1974 signed with EMI. His first album for this company was in 1975 and was successful in Latin America, in contrast to the little impact made by his music in Spain.

In 1976, Dyango won the prize (Sirenita de Oro) for the best performer and the best song of the Benidorm Song Festival with the song "Si yo fuera él". After winning in that festival, his career would grow both nationally and internationally.

Since the recording of the tango "Nostalgia" in 1976, Dyango consolidated his conquest of the Spanish market of the romantic ballad. In 1980, Dyango represented Spain in the OTI Festival 1980 with the song "Querer y perder" written by Ray Girado, winning second place.

Between 1983 and 1984 he launched to the market the discs Bienvendo to the Club and Al fin Alone to great success in Argentina and Colombia. In 1988, he honored the music of Buenos Aires, with his album Tango, becoming one of the few non-Rio de Janeiro artists to be accepted and blessed by the environment deltango, where he recorded a great friendship with Roberto Goyeneche. In 1985 he recorded the song "Por ese hombre" with the duo Pimpinela.

In 1989 he recorded the album Suspiros where he included the song "El que más te ha querido" by the composer Concha Valdes Miranda, achieving worldwide success. In 1993 he recorded the album Morir de amor where he recorded the duet with Nana Mouskouri: "Espérame en el cielo," a Los Panchos song.

In 1994 he recorded the album Un loco como yo, on which he sang a duet with the Mexican Armando Manzanero (author and director of all subjects) the song "Le ha costado caro." After several albums, in 1997 he published his longed-for album in Catalan, where he sang tangos in that language.

In the decade of the 2000s he published several albums of great successes, including such well-known songs as "Corazón mágico," "La mare" (in Catalán), "Por esa mujer," "Doctor," "Amor de tango," and "Cuando quieras donde quieras."

His album Puñaladas en el Alma with the Prague Symphony Orchestra and arrangements by Maestro Carlos Franzetti was nominated for a Latin Grammy Award in 2010, a work around the tango, recorded between Prague, New York and Barcelona.

In 2013 Dyango participated in the Concert for Freedom, held at Camp Nou in Barcelona on June 29, 2013. It was organized by Òmnium Cultural along with other civil society entities, such as the Assemblea Nacional Catalana (Catalan National Assembly) and the Plataforma Pro Seleccions Esportives Catalanes. When the singer announced his participation, there was outrage in many sectors of the rest of Spain. Dyango responded to the questions of 13 TV. He stated that in the current situation it would be necessary to hold a referendum in Catalonia and, ultimately, to achieve separation from Spain.

After summer of 2013 Dyango published the disc El Cantante, an album of romantic cuts that described his own life. On September 7, 2013, he announced his retirement from the long American tours, not from music or from the concerts.

The artist joined several personalities in March of that same year and lent his face to the campaign of the "ANC" in favor of a unilateral declaration of independence on the part of the governing authorities of Catalonia.

Since then, his repertoire has included "boleros" (romantic Spanish music), "tangos" (Argentinian music) and "rancheras" (Mexican music), remakes of songs from the 60's, dozens of his own songs, even lyrical pieces. In his career, he has recorded duets with the following artists: Celia Cruz, Oscar D'León, Sheena Easton, Roberto Goyeneche, Pimpinela and the tenor Jaume Aragall.

In 1989 he recorded the album Suspiros which included "El que más te ha querido" by composer Concha Valdés Miranda, reaching a worldwide success. He was nominated for a Grammy three times.

Dyango has obtained in his career 55 gold records and 40 platinum, which have been awarded in Spain as well as other Latin American countries, as well as the United States. Amongst them, A corazón Abierto has received double platinum status.

Dyango suffered a heart attack and was admitted in a Barcelona hospital until March 5, 2009.

Currently, Dyango is immersed with taking on new forms of expressions of his career, like painting. He is also an advocate of Catalonia's independence from Spain.

== Recognition and sales ==
In 1976 he obtained the prize (Sirenita de Oro) for the best performer and the best song of the Benidorm Song Festival with the song "Si yo fuera él".

Dyango received the Music Prize for Best Song in Catalan for his theme, "El pare" (The Father), 2005. Also, the Association of New York Artists, ACE, awarded him the Best Male Singer Award for "Esa mujer," March 21, 1987.

In 1988, the Miami authorities handed him the Key to the City and in 1992 the Giant program of the Univision Chain gave him the Key to the Program. He has also received several awards from the Betty Pino show in Miami, 1985, 1986, 1987, 1988.

From the Festival of Viña del Mar (Chile), the singer has 2 Torches, those of editions 25 and 31.

Dyango has been nominated several times for the Latin Grammy Awards, the last one in 2010 with the album Puñaladas en el Alma.

He has been invited as the main artist, to one of the best tango festivals in Argentina, the Tangos International Festival of the city of Justo Daract, to perform tangos and close the festival. Dyango was named Citizen Iluste of Justo Daract and received the Gold Condor Award in December 2011.

Dyango has won 55 gold and 40 platinum discs throughout his career. He has also recorded duets with Pimpinela, Rocío Dúrcal, Paco de Lucía, Celia Cruz, Oscar D'León, Sheena Easton, Roberto Goyeneche, Giacomo Aragall and Armando Manzanero.

== Farewell tour: Thanks, Goodbye and until forever ==
Dyango announced his farewell to his musical profession, making a farewell tour in Latin America and Spain and thanking thousands of people who formed his international audience.

The singer visited several countries in Latin America in July 2017, visiting Argentina to present his new album ¿Y ahora qué?.

== Billboard charts ==
- 1987: La Hora del Adios (con Rocío Dúrcal) (No. 5)
- 1987: Golpes Bajos (No. 8)
- 1987: A Falta de Ti (No. 20)
- 1987: Por Quererme a Mí (No. 44)
- 1988: Amen (No. 12)
- 1988: Ahora (No. 7)
- 1988: Penas de Amor (No. 39)
- 1989: El Que Más Te Ha Querido (No. 6)
- 1992: Alta Marea (Don't Dream It's Over) (No. 26)
- 1993: Morir de Amor (No. 36)
- 1994: Rey de Corazones (No. 26)

== See also ==
- List of best-selling Latin music artists
