= Esa mujer (TV series) =

Argentine telenovela

- Genre: telenovela
- Written by: Enrique Torres
- Directed by: Nicolás del Boca
- Starring: Andrea del Boca; Segundo Cernadas
- Country of origin: Argentina
- Original language: Spanish
- No. of seasons: 1
- No. of episodes: 120

Production
- Producer: Andrea del Boca

Original release
- Network: Televisión Pública

Esa mujer (English: That Woman) is an Argentine telenovela starring and produced by Andrea del Boca, and directed by her father Nicolás del Boca. It aired between 2013 and 2014 on Argentine public TV network.

The music theme in the series was the song "El amor es así", performed by Andrea del Boca and Gigi D'Alessio. Esa mujer was broadcast on weekdays at 2pm and its first episode attracted 2.5 million viewers on 9 December 2013. The series concluded on 27 May 2014 with 1.5 million viewers. Andrea Del Boca's role as well as the series itself were nominated to Martín Fierro Awards.

== Cast ==
- Andrea del Boca as Nicolasa Morales
- Segundo Cernadas as Ignacio Acevedo
- Esteban Meloni as Diego Acevedo
- Miriam Lanzoni as Patricia López Zambrano
- Roberto Carnaghi as Orlando López Zambrano
- Brenda Gandini as Gisela Betsabé
- Salo Pasik as Alfredo Morales
- Victoria Carreras as Samantha Morales
- Nora Cárpena as Victoria Acevedo
