= Ecos de mi tierra =

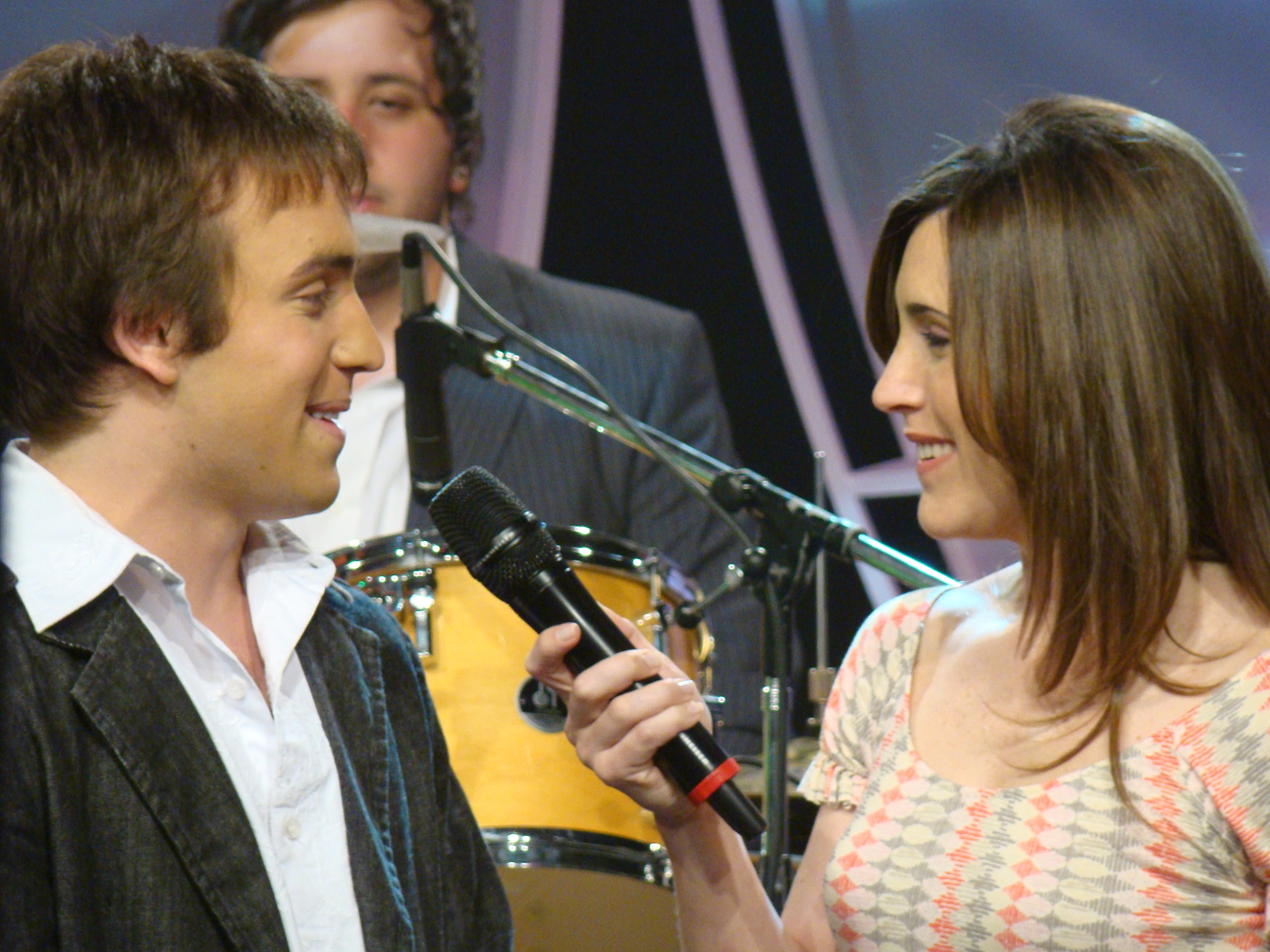

Ecos de mi tierra is an Argentine television programme focused on Argentine folk music.

== Awards ==
- 2015 Martín Fierro Awards
  - Best musical program
