= Julio Bazán =

Argentine journalist

Julio Bazan (born October 4, 1946) is an Argentine journalist who works for the Clarín newspaper and its cable channel, TN "Todo Noticias".

== Award Nomination ==
- 2013 Martín Fierro Awards- Best news reporter
