= Martina Soto Pose =

Argentine journalist

Martina Soto Pose is an Argentine newsreporter.

== Awards ==
=== Nominations ===
- 2013 Martín Fierro Awards
  - Best news reporter
