= Bajada de línea =

- Genre: News
- Presented by: Víctor Hugo Morales
- Country of origin: Argentina
- Original language: Spanish
- No. of seasons: 6
- No. of episodes: 100+

Production
- Running time: 60 minutes

Original release
- Network: Canal 9
- Release: April 6, 2010 – December 19, 2015

Bajada de línea is an Argentine television program hosted by Víctor Hugo Morales.

== Nominations ==
- 2013 Martín Fierro Awards
  - Best journalism program
