= La cornisa =

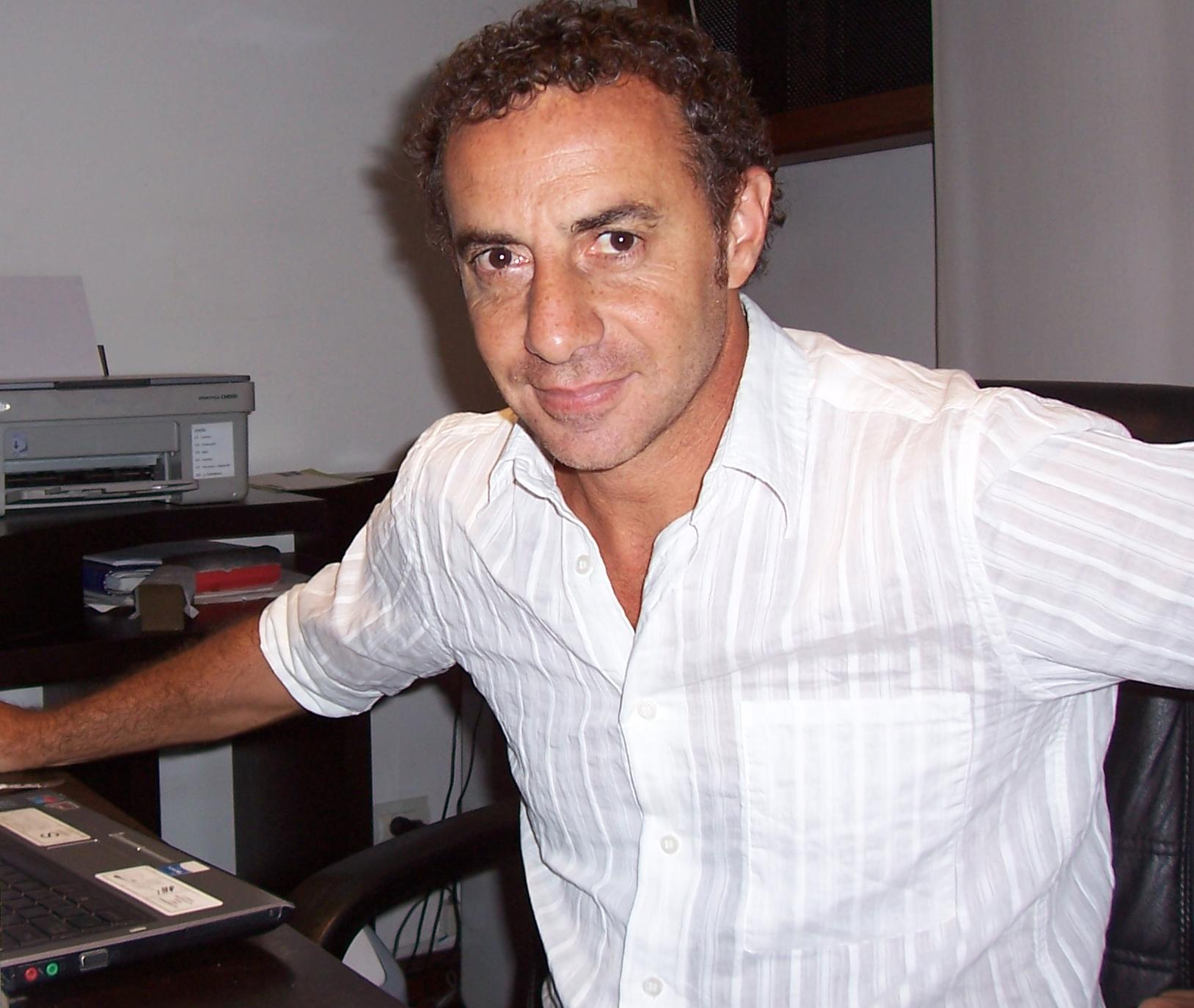
Luis Majul, host of La Cornisa

La Cornisa is an Argentine weekly news show hosted by Luis Majul. It was first aired in 1999 at P&E, and moved to Canal 7 Argentina and América TV and then to La Nacion +.
