= Una tarde cualquiera =

Argentine television program

Una tarde cualquiera is an Argentine television program hosted by El Bahiano.

== Nominations ==
- 2013 Martín Fierro Awards
  - Best program for kids

== Columnists ==
Agostina Concilio Daniel Wizenberg Daniela Katz Cristián Domínguez Sonsoles Segovia Irene Miguez Tania Chávez Chiara Mezza.
