= Rolo Villar =

Argentine radio humorist

Rolando Ernesto Oyamburo, known as Rolo Villar is an Argentine radio host.

Villar was born in Los Pinos, Buenos Aires and is of Spanish Basque, Italian and Spanish Zamorano descent through his paternal grandfather, paternal grandmother and maternal grandparents, respectively.

== Awards ==
- 2014 Martín Fierro Awards: Best work in humor.
