= Marcelo Longobardi =

Argentine radio personality

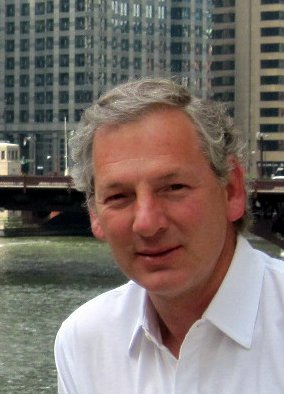
- Born: March 21, 1961 (age 65); Buenos Aires, Argentina
- Occupation: Journalist

Marcelo Longobardi (born March 21, 1961) is an Argentine radio presenter.

== Biography ==
Marcelo Longobardi established the magazine "Apertura" in 1982. He worked in several radios from 1986 to 2000: Radio El Mundo, Radio del Plata, Radio Libertad and Radio America. In 2000 he began the radio program "Cada mañana" in Radio 10. The program was moved in 2012 to Radio Mitre. He left Radio Mitre after a program timing row with colleague Jorge Lanata, arguing that he wanted to seek a new path in life. A few months later he was working for CNN on the Argentine radio station, he spent some 8 or 9 months there but was unable to surpass 6% market share during the early morning time frame. He left ( or was fired; this is unclear) CNN and remained without a job for some months until he landed work on an early morning show with Radio Rivadavia. From being the leading radio program of the early morning in Argentina while he was in Radio Mitre, he was struggling to hold to a 4th place in Radio Rivadavia. Currently he has a youtube channel where he maintains his form of work and doing livestreams from monday to friday at 7:00 AM UTC-3

== Awards ==
- 2013 Martín Fierro Awards – Best male radio host

== Personal life ==
Longobardi is of Portuguese descent through his maternal grandmother.
