= María Martha Serra Lima =

Argentine canción melódica singer

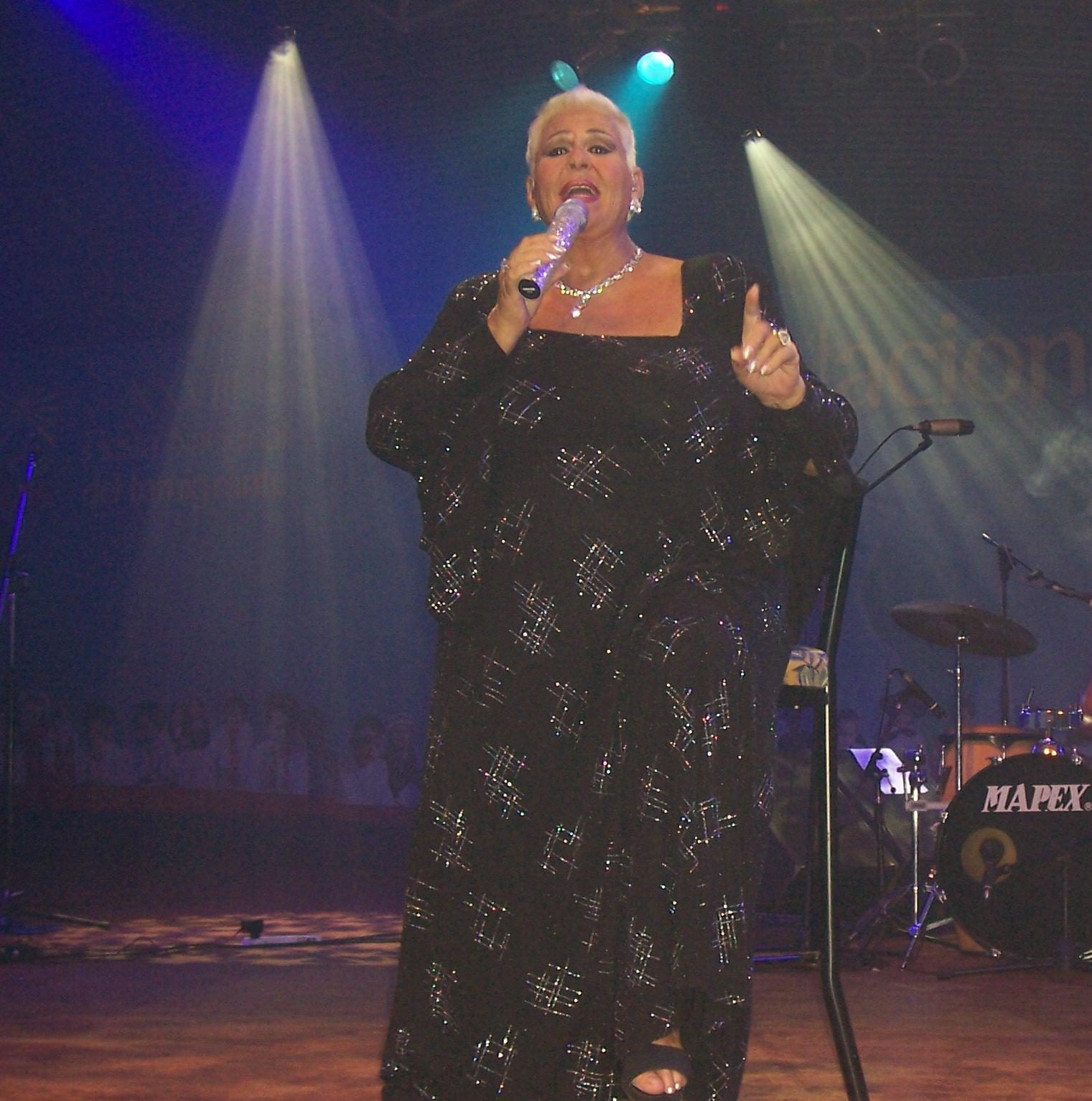
- Serra Lima performing in Oberá, Misiones
- Born: December 19, 1942; Buenos Aires, Argentina
- Died: November 2, 2017 (aged 72); Miami, Florida, United States
- Occupation: Singer

María Martha Serra Lima (December 19, 1942–November 2, 2017) was an Argentine canción melódica singer.

== Life and work ==
Born in Buenos Aires to a family of auto dealership proprietors, Serra Lima was first signed on to a record label in 1977, and became famous across Latin America and in Spain during the 1970s and 1980s. Known for her contralto vocal texture and her repertoire of love ballads and boleros, she collaborated extensively with singer-songwriters from elsewhere in Latin America, particularly Mexican standards such as Los Panchos and Armando Manzanero; among her best-known, non-Hispanic interpretations is that of Paul Anka's My Way. Her albums became hits in Mexico, Puerto Rico, Chile, Colombia, Venezuela, and elsewhere in the region, apart from her home country.

She shared the stage with numerous major international singers, done multiple international tours and won many awards through her career as a singer. Serra Lima sold in excess of 10 million albums in the late 1970s and early 1980s.

== Discography ==
- María Martha Serra Lima (1978)
- Personal (1979)
- Entre nosotros (1980)
- Estilo (1982)
- Sentir (1983)
- Esencia romántica 2 (1984)
- Plenamente (1985)
- El viaje (1986)
- ¡10 años contigo! (1987)
- Matices (1989)
- Mis boleros (1989)
- Quién soy (1990)
- Lo mejor de mí (1991)
- Como nunca (1993)
- Símbolo de amor (1994)
- Cosas de la vida (1995)
- Para estar contigo (1996)
- Esencia romántica 3 (1998)
- Baladas de amor (2001)
- Intensa (2004)
- Con el alma (2011)
