= Reynaldo Sietecase =

Argentinian journalist, writer, poet and presenter

Reynaldo Sietecase is an Argentine journalist. He works at the TV news Telefe Noticias, and won the 2013 Tato award for best journalist work.

== Awards ==
=== Nominations ===
- 2013 Martín Fierro Awards
  - Best male journalist
