= El show del fútbol =

El show del fútbol is an Argentine television program.

== Awards ==
- 2015 Martín Fierro Awards
- Best sports program

=== Nominations ===
- 2013 Martín Fierro Awards
  - Best sports program
