= Gonzalo Slipak =

Argentine actor

Gonzalo Slipak is an Argentine actor.

== Awards ==
=== Nominations ===
- 2013 Martín Fierro Awards
  - Best new actor or actress
