= Roberto Carnaghi =

Argentine actor (born 1938)

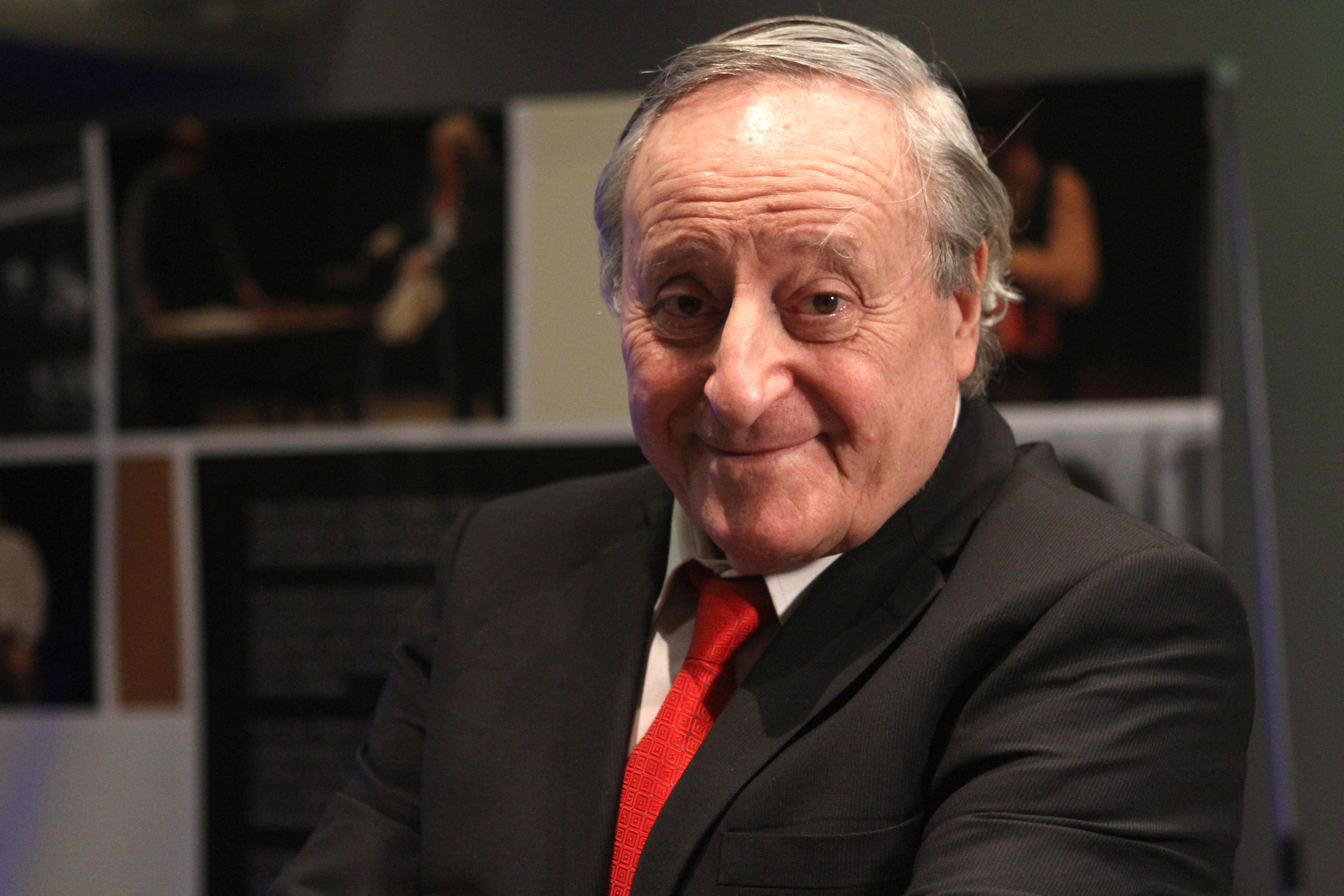
- Roberto Carnaghi in 2014
- Born: Roberto Luis Carnaghi; 13 May 1938 (age 87); Avellaneda, Buenos Aires, Argentina
- Occupation: Actor
- Years active: 1959–present
- Known for: Work with Tato Bores
- Spouse: Julia Blanco (m. 1965)
- Children: 3

Roberto Luis Carnaghi (born 13 May 1938) is an Argentine actor who has appeared in 44 films, about 60 plays, more than 50 television programmes, and nearly 100 advertisements.

== Biography ==
Carnaghi was born on 13 May 1938, in Avellaneda. He studied acting at the school of the Teatro Municipal de San Isidro and the National School of Drama, where he graduated in 1966.

He began his professional career as a stage actor in the Teatro General San Martin. His stage roles have included major roles in several plays of William Shakespeare, including King Lear and The Merchant of Venice.

Roberto Carnaghi got his start in advertising at the James Walter Thompson advertising agency. He was initially rejected, as his face was not up to standards, but he was eventually hired, and worked in nearly 100 advertisements, promoting brands such as Ford and Citroen. His work allowed him to work in TV in the 1980s, as well as some minor film roles. He became famous with his jobs at the talk shows of Tato Bores. He has worked in several genres and mediums along the years; his work with Tato Bores was comedic and his contemporary theater plays were dramas. He also worked for comedians Antonio Gasalla and Guillermo Francella.

He worked in the 2006 Argentine telenovela Montecristo, and his character referenced the kidnapping of babies of the Argentine guerrillas killed during the 1970s Dirty War. Although he is completely against such action, he tried to avoid making his character inherently evil, proposed to include in the script that he was married to an infertile wife. In that year he also received the Gold ACE Award, for his 40 years of work.

In 2012 he took part in the successful telenovela Graduados. Carnaghi and Mirta Busnelli played the parents of a Jewish family; he pointed that his relation with his sons differs from his character. He received a Tato Award as supporting actor, and he was declared a "featured personality of culture" by the legislature of the Buenos Aires city. This recognition, proposed by the legislator María José Lubertino, is complemented by a similar one from his home neighbourhood of Villa Urquiza.

=== Film ===
Year	Film	Role
1970	Este loco verano	
1970	La fidelidad	
1971	Alianza para el progreso	
1972	El picnic de los Campanelli	Priest
1974	La flor de la mafia	Homosexual 1
1974	Yo tengo fe	
1975	Los chantas	Janitor
1975	La Raulito	
1975	Los chiflados dan el golpe	
1976	La noche del hurto	
1976	Juan que reía	
1976	Dos locos en el aire	
1977	Basta de mujeres	
1979	Vivir con alegría	
1979	Este loco amor loco	
1980	Crucero de placer	
1980	Queridas amigas	
1980	Los superagentes y la gran aventura del oro	
1981	Los Parchís contra el inventor invisible	
1984	El juguete rabioso	
1984	Los insomnes	
1986	Sinfín	
1991	Ya no hay hombres	
1993	De eso no se habla	
1994	Una sombra ya pronto serás	Priest Salinas
1995	20 de junio	
1995	De mi barrio con amor	
1996	Sol de otoño	
1996	Moebius	-
1997	Noche de ronda	
1997	Fuga de cerebros	
1997	Plaza de almas	
1997	Momentos robados	
1998	Zapallares	
1998	El desvío	Morales
1998	Cohen vs. Rosi	Giancarlo Rosi
1998	Dibu 2, la venganza de Nasty	Sr. Mor and Nasty-Mor
1998	Comisario Ferro	Forensic
1999	Tres veranos	Ricardo
2000	El amor y el espanto	
2001	Visita	Lali
2001	Chiquititas: Rincón de Luz	Mayor
2002	¿Y dónde está el bebé?	
2002	Mercano, el marciano	Narrator
2002	Bahía mágica	Captain
2004	Ay, Juancito	
2004	Teo, cazador intergaláctico	Siniestri
2004	Otra vuelta	Uncle Basilio
2005	Elsa y Fred	Gabriel
2007	Regresados	Valdemar
2009	100% Lucha, el amo de los clones	
2009	Esperando la carroza 2	Jorge Musicardi
2010	Boca de fresa	Roberto
2011	Una cita, una fiesta y un gato negro	De Negris

=== Television ===
Year	TV series	Character
1987	Ficciones	
1990	Tato en busca de la vereda del sol	Corrupt politician
1991	Tato, la leyenda continúa	Corrupt politician
1992	Tato de América	Corrupt politician
1993	Good Show	
1994	El palacio de la risa	Various Characters
2000	Primicias	Di Nardo
2001	Poné a Francella	Pan y agua/Hermano Roberto/Hannibal Lecter
2001	Visita	
2002	Franco Buenaventura, el profe	Octavio Buenaventura
2003	Soy gitano	Don Vittorio 'Vito' Malvestiti
2003	Disputas	Flavio
2004	La Niñera	Fidel
2004	Panadería los Felipe	
2005	Sin crédito	
2005	Doble vida	Marcos
2006	Montecristo	Lisandro Donosso
2006	Amor mío	Alejandro Chapas
2007	El Capo	Moisés Svarsky
2008	Aquí no hay quien viva	Hipólito
2008	Algo habrán hecho por la historia argentina	Lisandro de la Torre
2008	Todos contra Juan	Himself
2009-2010	Botineras	Humberto Arregui
2010-2011	Contra las cuerdas	Hugo
2011	Diálogos fundamentales del Bicentenario	Lula Da Silva/Lisandro de la Torre
2011	Tiempo de pensar	
2011	Los Sónicos	El Sapo
2012	Graduados	Elías Goddzer
2013	En terapia	
2013	Esa mujer	Orlando López Zambrano
2015	Signos	Miguel Abdala
2015	Conflictos modernos	
2015	Milagros en campaña	
2016	Si solo si	
2016	Loco por vos	Edgardo
2017–2018	Soy Luna	Alfredo Benson

=== Theater ===
- The Crucible, 2012
- El patio de la morocha, 2011
- Mateo
- King Lear, 2009. Role: Earl of Gloucester
- La vuelta al mundo
- La jaula de las locas
- King Lear, 2006
- La zapatera prodigiosa
- The Resistible Rise of Arturo Ui
- Discepolín y Yo
- Mrs. Warren's Profession
- Anfitrión
- Shylock (an adaptation of The Merchant of Venice), 1999. Role: Shylock
- Alice in Wonderland
- El jardín de los cerezos
- Richard III
- Morgan
- Peer Gynt
- El burlador de Sevilla
- La opera de dos centavos
- Three Sisters, 1987. Role: Chebutikin
- Tartufo
- Los pilares de la sociedad
- Cuatro caballetes
- No hay que llorar
- Primaveras
- Babilonia
- Bienaventurados
- Subterráneo Buenos Aires
- Los cuernos de Don Friolera
- Santa Juana
- El mago
- La historia del soldado
- El pibe de oro
- Hamlet. Role: Polonius
- Escenas de la calle
- El alcalde dé Zalamea
- Casamiento entre vivos y muertos
- Don Juan
- Cyrano de Bergerac
- Macbeth
- El casamiento de Laucha

== Awards ==
=== Nominations ===
- 2013 Martín Fierro Awards
  - Best secondary actor (for En terapia)
- 2016 Premio Shakespeare - Otorgado por la Fundación Romeo y la Embajada Británica en Buenos Aires.
