= Telefe Noticias =

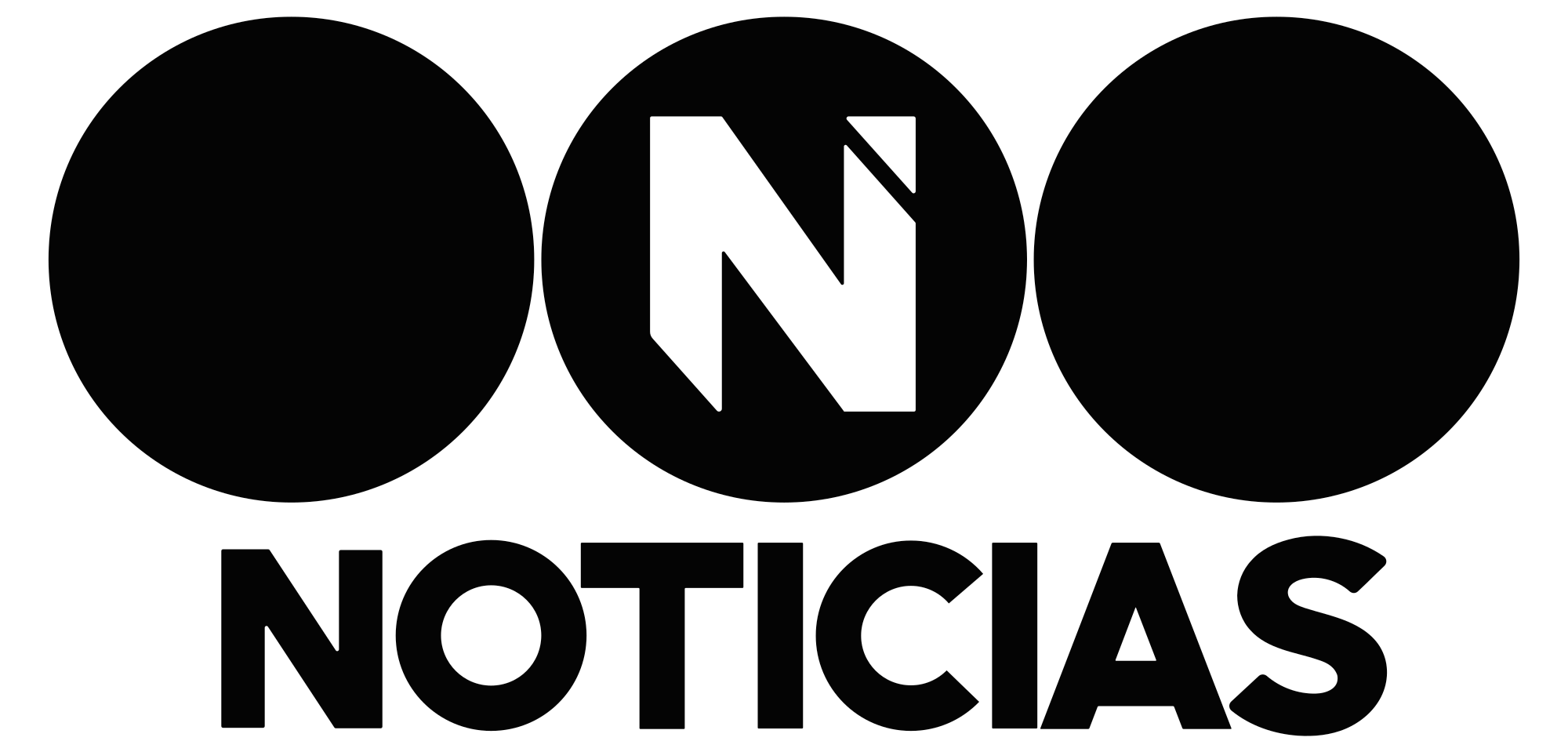
Telefe Noticias 2017 logo

Telefe Noticias is an Argentine TV news program. It is aired by Telefe since 1990. Now, it is the most-watched newscast every evening, surpassing Channel 13's Telenoche.

== History ==
Telefe had a trusted and respected news service during the first half of the 1990s, but after 1995, was often criticised for the sensational style adopted by its then news director Horacio Larrosa (former Channel 9 news director and inventor of Nuevediario). In 1999, hundreds of workers were sacked, closing Red de Noticias (Telefe's cable news channel) and the 7:00 pm edition was canceled, limiting the news to the midday report. From 2002, the newscast underwent important modifications, such as graphics, new presenters (newsreaders Cristina Pérez and Rodolfo Barili), reinstatement of the evening edition and a new editorial line, which made the newscast recover credibility. In November 2006, Telefe began broadcasting its editions from a newly built newsroom, and slowly returned to the tabloid style of the 1990s. In 2008, the 7:00 pm hour-long edition was moved to 8:00 pm, trying to compete with Channel 13's main edition. In 2011, a new morning newscast named Baires Directo premiered, first carried at 7:00 am and moved to 8:00 am from mid-2012. Since 2013, all the editions are in HD.

== Awards ==
- 2013 Martín Fierro Awards
  - Won: Best TV news program
  - Nominated: Best female TV host (Cristina Pérez); best male journalist (Reynaldo Sietecase)
