= Cacho Castaña =

Argentine singer (1942–2019)

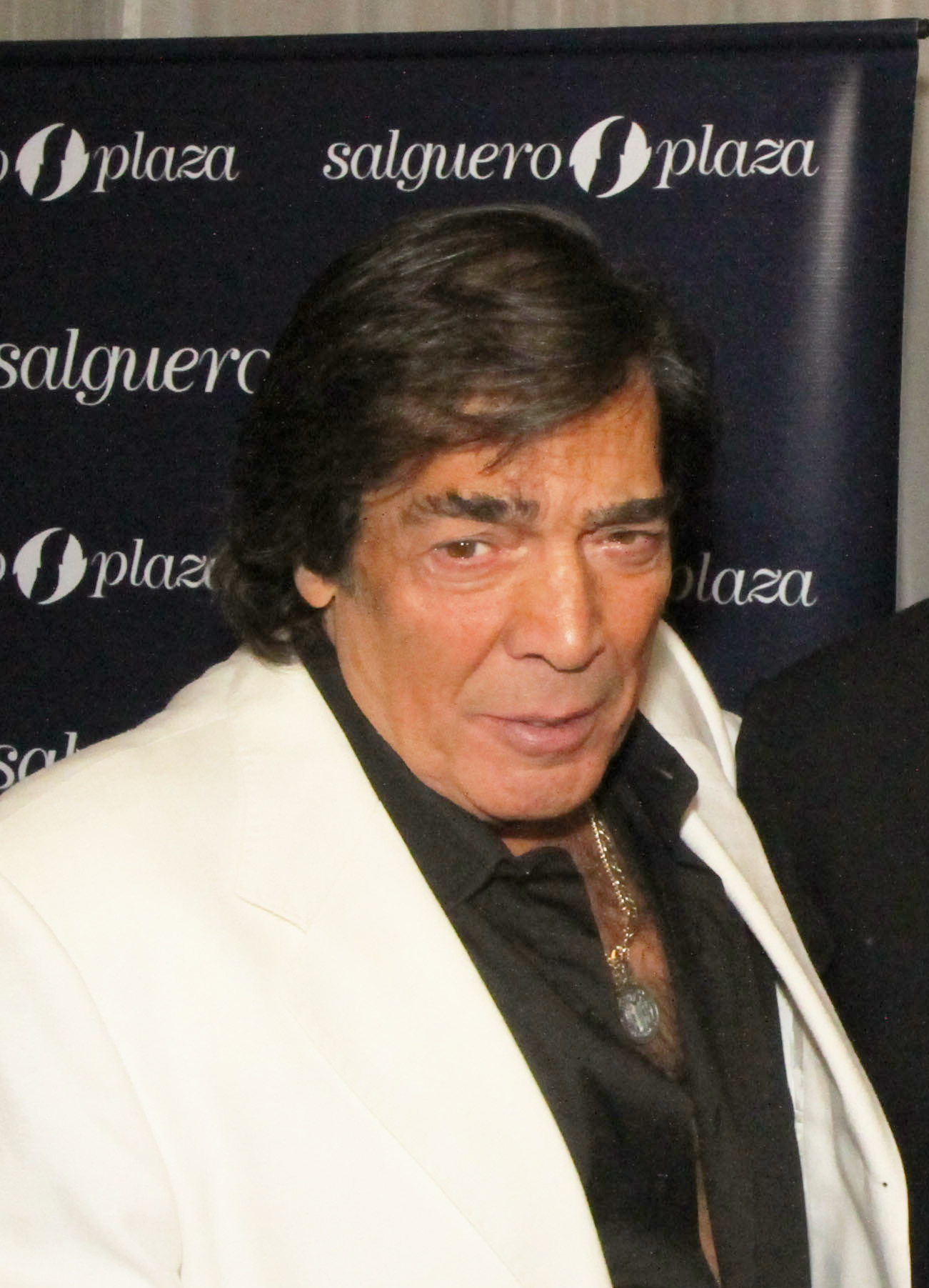
- Cacho Castaña in 2012
- Born: Humberto Vicente Castagna; June 11, 1942; Buenos Aires, Argentina
- Died: October 15, 2019 (aged 77); Buenos Aires, Argentina
- Occupation(s): Singer, songwriter, pianist, actor
- Years active: 1959–2019
- Spouses: Andrea Sblano (m. 2006; sep. 2011) Marina Rosenthal (m. 2012–2019)

Humberto Vicente Castagna (June 11, 1942 – October 15, 2019), better known as Cacho Castaña, was an Argentine singer, songwriter, pianist and actor. Born in Buenos Aires, he initially worked as a shoe cobbler before becoming famous as a bolero singer in the 1970s. Castana composed and sung various compositions and songs, several of which became gold and platinum records. He also starred in multiple films. Castaña's career declined during the 1990s but rebounded after 2003 and he became active in Argentina's stage and festival circuit.

== Early life ==
Cacho Castaña was born in Buenos Aires and was raised in modest circumstances in the Flores neighborhood. He worked with his father, a shoe cobbler, until he was 16. He developed an interest in music during his early years, becoming a piano teacher by the age of fourteen. He began his career in music in his teens as a pianist in Oscar Espósito's orquesta típica, one of numerous such groups that performed tango music at the time, and also performed in the Chamamé folk genre.

== Career ==
=== Music ===
Castaña became famous as a bolero singer during the 1970s. He began performing on Argentine television programs such as Tiempo Final and Un Cortado, among others. He wrote numerous hits, including Me gusta, me gusta ("I like it, I like it"), Lo llaman el matador ("He's Nicknamed the Killer") and Hay que encontrar al ladrón ("The Thief Must be Found"), and his signature bolero: Para vivir un gran amor ("To Live a Great Love"). His lyrics became known for their extemporaneous and often autobiographical style, which he described as "writing as I would speak."

He is much better known for his contributions to tango music. Some of his compositions are considered classics by his fans, including Qué tango hay que cantar ("What Tango Must One Sing", with Rubén Juárez), Garganta con Arena ("Throat full of sand", an homage to Roberto Goyeneche, his mentor), "Tita de Buenos Aires", (Tita de Buenos Aires, dedicated to Tita Merello), A dónde vas? Quedate en Buenos Aires ("Where are you going? Stay in Buenos Aires"). Aside from these songs, he also composed an ode to the Flores neighborhood: Café la Humedad. Castaña composed around 2,500 songs, of which 500 have been recorded. He produced 44 records, of which fifteen became gold records (over 20,000 sold, per CAPIF ratings), and ten, platinum (over 40,000 sold).

=== Film ===
Aside from his musical career, Castaña was involved in filmography. Castaña starred in thirteen Argentine films, including two for which he wrote the score, El mundo que inventamos ("The World We Created", 1973) and Los hijos de López ("López's Sons", 1980); numerous picaresque comedies; and in Felicidades (2000). A confirmed bachelor for much of his life, his numerous relationships included one with Susana Giménez during the 1970s (Giménez would later become a top-rated talk show hostess in Argentina). He ultimately married Andrea Sblano, the 27-year-old daughter of a close friend, in 2006; among his other close friends was former President Carlos Menem. His television appearances in later years included a cameo on the popular Argentine telenovela, Los Roldán. He earned a Konex Award in 2005 for his work as a songwriter, and his tango album released that year, Espalda con espalda ("Back to back") earned a Gardel Prize. He was invited to perform "with all the other monsters" in Leopoldo Federico's series, Selección Nacional de Tango Argentino (an event he considered "the happiest day of my life"), and was inducted into the National Academy of Tango in 2007.

=== Decline ===
Castaña's career declined during the 1990s, but rebounded after 2003, and he became active in Argentina's stage and festival circuit. He headlined numerous Corrientes Avenue shows, and was a regular performer in the National Peña Festival, in Villa María. A heavy smoker, he developed emphysema in later years, and was twice hospitalized as he prepared to appear in shows. He and his wife opened a children's clothing boutique, Las Castañitas. Their marriage suffered, however, and they separated in 2011. He was again hospitalized following the separation, and made a speedy recovery.

== Death ==
Cacho Castaña died on October 15, 2019, due to complications from COPD after being hospitalized for two weeks.
