= Pimpinela =

Argentine musical duo

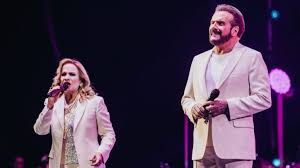
- Pimpinela performing in 2019

Background information
- Origin: Buenos Aires, Argentina
- Genres: Canción melódica
- Years active: 1981–present
- Label: Universal
- Members: Lucía Galán; Joaquín Galán
- Website: www.pimpinela.net

Pimpinela is an Argentine duo formed by brother and sister Joaquín Galán and Lucía Galán. Since 1981, the group is famous for singing romantic musical pieces and known for their original singing style. They have sold over 12 million records in Argentina and a total of 15 million worldwide, making them one of the best-selling Latin music artists.

== History ==
Lucía Galán Cuervo and Joaquín Roberto Galán Cuervo were born in Buenos Aires, Argentina. Joaquín and Lucía are siblings of Spanish settler ancestry, more accurately of an Asturian father and Leonese mother. At first, they sang for family and friends, but later they each pursued a solo career. Joaquín joined the group "Luna de Cristal".

In 1981 the duo recorded their first single together.

In 1984 their song "Olvídame y pega la vuelta" became a number one hit. Others followed, and as they continued to rise in fame, they developed a characteristic style of couples arguing and breaking up, rather than falling in love.

In the 1990s the group Trans Faces, which included drag artist Usha Didi Gunatita, produced drag shows in different venues in Asunción, which imitated famous people such as Eva Perón, Pimpinela and Tita Merello.

In December 2020, Pimpinela released the single "2020: El Año Que Se Detuvo el Tiempo", whose lyrics reflect on the emotional impact of the COVID-19 pandemic that had been going for a full year at the time of release.

== Discography ==
Studio albums

- Las Primeras Golondrin (1981)
- Pimpinela (1982)
- Hermanos (1983)
- Convivencia (1984)
- Lucía y Joaquín (1985)
- El Duende Azul (1986)
- Valiente/Estaciones (1987)
- Ahora me Toca a Mí (1988)
- Hay Amores... y Amores (1990)
- 10 Años Después (1991)
- Pimpinela '92 (1992)
- Hay Amores que Matan (1993)
- De Corazón a Corazón (1995)
- Pasiones (1997)
- Marido y Mujer (1998)
- Corazón Gitano (1999)
- Buena Onda (2000)
- Al Modo Nuestro (2003)
- ¿Dónde Están los Hombres? (2005)
- Diamante (2008)
- ¡Estamos Todos Locos! (2011)
- Son Todos Iguales (2016)

== See also ==
- List of best-selling Latin music artists
