= Peligro: sin codificar =

Peligro: sin codificar is a comedy television show from Argentina. It began in 2008 on América TV, and then moved to Telefe.

== Awards ==
- 2013 Martín Fierro Awards
  - Best humoristic program
- 2014 Martín Fierro Awards
  - Best humoristic program
- 2015 Martín Fierro Awards
  - Best humoristic program
