= 45th Martín Fierro Awards =

45th Annual Martín Fierro Awards
- Awarded for: Martín Fierro Awards for 2014 Argentine television and radio programs
- Sponsored by: Asociación de Periodistas de la Televisión y Radiofonía Argentina
- Date: June 14, 2015
- Location: Hilton Buenos Aires
- Country: Argentina
- Hosted by: Mariana Fabbiani, Guido Kaczka
- Preshow hosts: Paula Chaves, Iván de Pineda
- Reward: Martín Fierro Awards
- First award: 2015

Highlights
- Most awards: Guapas
- Most nominations: Guapas

Television/radio coverage
- Network: El Trece

The 45th Annual Martín Fierro Awards, presented by the Asociación de Periodistas de la Televisión y Radiofonía Argentina (APTRA), was held on June 14, 2015. During the ceremony, APTRA announced the Martín Fierro Awards for 2014 Argentine television and radio programs.

== Nominations ==
Carlos Sciacaluga of APTRA announced the nominations at El diario de Mariana, a TV program hosted by Mariana Fabbiani, who would host the awards ceremony. The controversial nomination for the best journalist program pitted 6, 7, 8 against Periodismo para todos (PPT) once more. The first program is a vocal supporter of the president Cristina Fernández de Kirchner, and the second is a vocal critic of her; Jorge Lanata from PPT was awarded in previous years and made political speeches when he received the award. Intratables, which had been nominated under other genres in previous years, was the third program in the nomination.

The telenovela Guapas received the highest number of nominations, 11. It was followed by the telenovelas Viudas e hijos del Rock & Roll, with 7 nominations, and Sres. Papis, with 6. Underground producciones, producers of Viudas..., were surprised that Verónica Llinás and Luis Machín did not receive a nomination, and boycotted the ceremony.

== The event ==
The awards ceremony was held on June 14, 2015, at the Hilton Buenos Aires. Mariana Fabbiani and Guido Kaczka were the hosts of the ceremony, and both of them received their own awards during the event: Fabbiani was awarded as best female TV host, and Kaczka was the host of Los 8 escalones, best entertainment program.

Rosario Lufrano made a speech in support of the #NiUnaMenos demonstration against femicides which had taken place a short time before. Singer Fabiana Cantilo attended the ceremony for the first time, being the singer of the opening theme for Guapas, and won the first of the several awards received by the telenovela. Jorge Lanata did not attend the ceremony, and his awards were received by fellow journalist Nicolás Wiñazki. 12 casas and Carla Peterson were among the unexpected winners, and Juan Minujín received the sole award given to Viudas....

Guapas received the Golden Martín Fierro Award, which was presented by Griselda Siciliani and Julieta Zylberberg (actresses from Farsantes, the previous year's winner). The producer Adrián Suar downplayed the protest of Underground, and pointed that several actors from Guapas deserved a nomination as well but did not receive one.

== Awards ==
=== Television ===
Winners are listed first and highlighted in boldface. Other nominations are listed in alphabetic order.

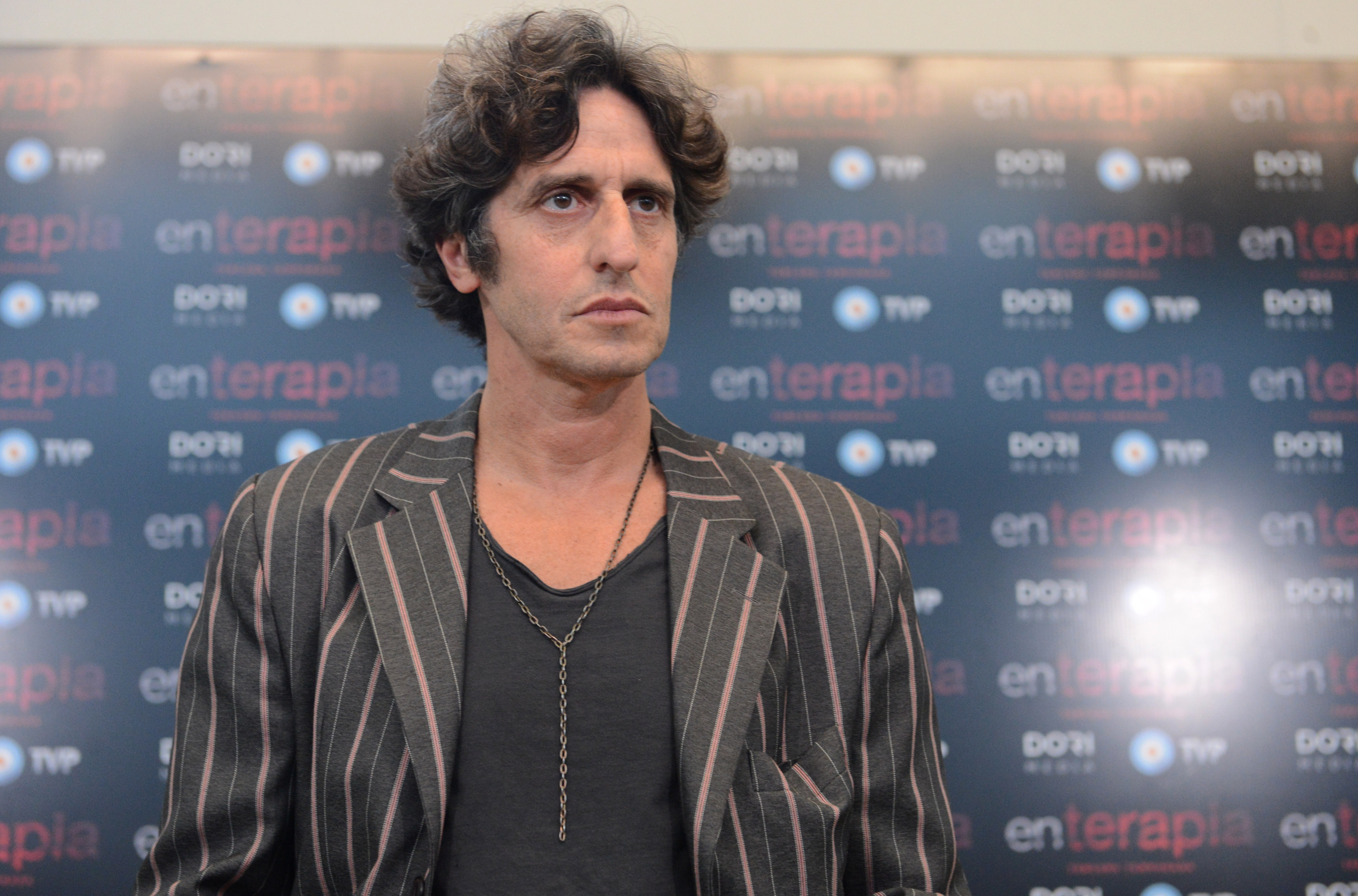
Diego Peretti, best lead actor of miniseries.

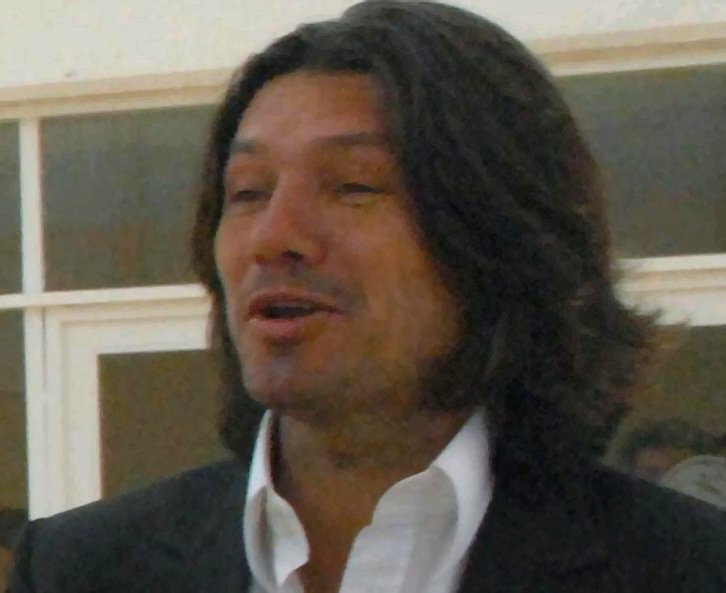
Marcelo Tinelli, best male TV host.

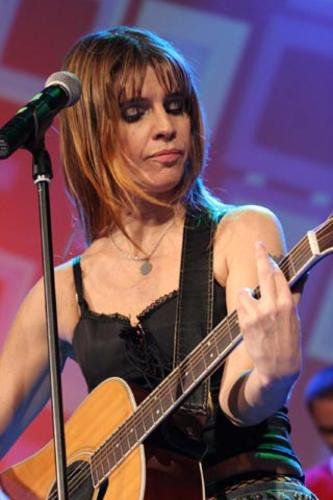
Fabiana Cantilo, singer of "Guapas", best opening theme.

Best journalist program	Best miniseries
**Periodismo para todos**; 6, 7, 8; Intratables	**Doce casas**; En terapia; Viento sur
Best daily drama	Best Reality
**Guapas**; Sres. Papis; Viudas e hijos del Rock & Roll	**ShowMatch**; MasterChef; Tu cara me suena
Best TV news	Best humoristic program
**Telefe Noticias**; América Noticias; Telenoche	**Peligro: sin codificar**; Bendita; Peter Capusotto y sus videos
Best production	Best male TV host
**Showmatch**; Fútbol para todos; Periodismo para todos	**Marcelo Tinelli** (Showmatch); Leonardo Montero (Am, Antes del Mediodía); Santiago del Moro (Intratables)
Best female TV host	Best magazine
**Mariana Fabbiani** - El diario de Mariana; Susana Giménez - Susana Giménez; Mirtha Legrand - Almorzando con Mirtha Legrand	**Almorzando con Mirtha Legrand**; Animales Sueltos; Cocineros argentinos
Best cultural TV program	Best entertainment program
**Científicos Industria Argentina**; Filmoteca, temas de cine; Puerto Cultura	**Los 8 escalones**; Escape Perfecto; Susana Gimenez
Best TV program for kids	Best lead actor of daily fiction
**Aliados**; Panam y circo; Una tarde cualquiera	**Juan Minujín** (Viudas e hijos del Rock & Roll); Facundo Arana (Noche y día); Damián De Santo (Viudas e hijos del Rock & Roll); Joaquín Furriel (Sres. Papis); Luciano Cáceres (Sres. Papis)
Best lead actress of daily fiction	Best sports TV program
**Carla Perterson** (Guapas); Araceli González (Guapas); Isabel Macedo (Guapas); Mercedes Morán (Guapas); Paola Barrientos (Viudas e hijos del Rock & Roll)	**Broadcast of the 2014 FIFA World Cup**; Carburando; Fútbol para todos
Best female journalist	Best male journalist
**Luciana Geuna** - Periodismo para todos; María Julia Oliván - Intratables; Marisa Andino	**Jorge Lanata** - Periodismo para todos; Guillermo Andino; Matías Martin
Best news reporter	Best lead actor of miniseries
**Guillermo Panizza**; Mario Massacessi; Sandra Borghi	**Diego Peretti** (En terapia); Carlos Belloso (La celebración); Miguel Angel Solá (En terapia)
Best lead actress of miniseries	Best work in humor
**Claudia Lapacó** (Doce casas); Maite Zumelzu (Viento Sur); Marilú Marini (Doce casas)	**Fátima Florez** (Periodismo para todos); Alejandro Gardinetti; Diego Capusotto (Peter Capusotto y sus videos)
Best secondary actor	Best secondary actress
**Alberto Ajaka** (Guapas); Darío Gardinetti (En terapia); Raúl Taibo (Camino al amor)	**Julieta Díaz** (Sres. Papis); Gloria Carrá (Sres. Papis); Julieta Zylberberg (Guapas)
Best new actor or actress	Best script writers
**Dan Breitman** (Guapas); Dario Barassi (Viudas e hijos del Rock & Roll); Santiago Magariños (En terapia)	**Leandro Caldero, Carolina Aguirre** (Guapas); Ernesto Korovsky, Silvina Fredjkes, Alejandro Quesada (Viudas e hijos del Rock & Roll); Javier Van de Couter, Alejandro Quesada (La celebración)
Best director	Best opening theme
**Daniel Barone** (Guapas); Alberto Lecchi (En terapia); Alejandro Ripoll (ShowMatch)	"**Guapas**", by Fabiana Cantilo (Guapas); "Cuatro Vientos", by Bersuit Vergarabat (Sres. Papis); "Tus Horas Mágicas", by Tan Biónica (Viudas e hijos del Rock & Roll)
Best advertisement	Golden Martín Fierro Award
"**Estás Dulce**"; "Creación"; "Libertad"	Guapas

=== Radio ===
Winners are listed first and highlighted in boldface. Other nominations are listed in alphabetic order.

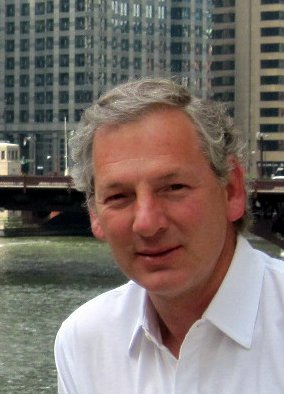
Marcelo Longobardi, host of "Cada mañana".

Best journalist program	Best female journalist
**Cada mañana**; El exprimidor; Lanata sin filtro	**Rosario Lufrano**; Romina Calderano; Thelma Luzzani
Best musical	Best male journalist
**Eternamente Beatles**; Desde el alma; Vorterix metal	**Jorge Lanata**; Alejandro Fantino; Raul Kollman
Best cultural program	Best program of general interest
**Las dos carátulas**; El tango en el cine; La noche y los cuentos	**Dady Brieva**; Encendidos en la tarde; Qué noche Teté
Best sports program	
**Súper Mitre Deportivo**; Mariano Closs; Un buen momento	

=== Honorary awards ===
- Honorific Martín Fierro award: Fundación Huésped, a NGO that works with HIV cases.
- Hilda Bernard, for her 73 years of working career.
