= Vivian El Jaber =

Argentine actress (born 1964)

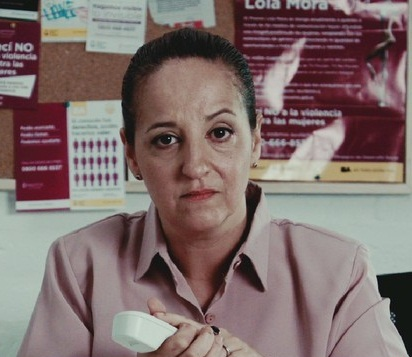
- El Jaber in an ad campaign against gender violence (2015)
- Born: 17 November 1964 (age 61); Buenos Aires, Argentina
- Children: 1
- Awards: Martín Fierro Award (2007, 2013); Estrella de mar (2011, 2012)

Vivian El Jaber (born 17 November 1964, Buenos Aires) is an Argentine actress, comedian and playwright. She is best known for her roles on the sketch show Cha Cha Cha, as Débora in Guapas and as Isabel in Farsantes.

== Biography ==
El Jaber was born in Buenos Aires in 1964. Her father was of Syrian descent and her mother was of Portuguese and Galician descent. She has at least two sisters—one younger and one older—and her father taught mathematical physics. She was raised in Palermo, a neighborhood of Buenos Aires.

She studied theatre with Roberto Saiz and Norman Briski and made her on-stage debut in 1986 at age 19 in the one-woman play De la pupila para adentro, which she had written. She frequented Parakultural in her early career. In 1991, she received a Bienal Arte Jóven award for her one-woman show F. E. A.. In addition to acting onstage — including in productions such as La llamada (2019), Julio César (2022) and Tootsie (2023) — El Jaber is an occasional playwright. When not writing alone, her most frequent writing collaborator is Mónica Gazpio. El Jaber was part of the main cast of Martín Bossi's Impostor plays for five seasons.

El Jaber was a cast member of the sketch show De la cabeza in the early 1990s and was the only woman to remain on the cast of Cha Cha Cha until the end of its run. She later worked on Patito Feo as Dorinha (2007-2008), Alguien que me quiera as Coca (2010-2011), Farsantes as Isabel (2013-2014) and Guapas as Débora. In 2014, El Jaber appeared in an ad campaign against gender violence with Soledad Silveyra, Guillermina Valdés, and Laura Natalia Esquivel. She also played María in the 2024 film The Penguin Lessons and called working with Jonathan Pryce and Steve Coogan a "dream come true."

== Personal life ==
El Jaber has one daughter, Calia (born ca. 2010). She has had three major relationships in her life, each lasting seven years, with only one leading to marriage when she was age 21. She is a longtime resident of Villa Devoto and has a home in Miramar, where she has a painting studio.

== Filmography ==
=== Film ===
Year	Title	Role	Refs
2001	Edificio sur	Vecina	
2002	Rosca de pascua	Silvia	
2003	El 48	Mirta	
2003	Chiche bombón	Hija chusma	
2005	Limonada	Vendedora	
2007	Tocar al cielo	Sandra	
2007	El cine de Maite		
2008	Todos aquellos	Justina	
2010	Pastelitos	Abuela	
2011	Un cuento chino	Rosa	
2012	Matadera	Julisa	
2013	El loro y el cisne	Celina	
2017	Casa Coraggio	Samira	
2019	Delfín	Silvana	
2020	Muertos infectados	Rita	
2021	En la cabeza de papá	Marta	
2021	Cuarto B	Limpiadora	
2022	Alerta disparo	Marcia	
2022	Amor del mercado	Claudia	
2023	Casi muerta	Dra. Rey	
2023	El brillo de la mujer	Mujer madura	
2024	The Penguin Lessons	María	

=== Television ===
Year	Title	Role	Notes	Refs
1990	Estafa de amor	Matilde Pascual		
1992	La bonita pagina	Telma		
1992-1993	De la cabeza	Various		
1992, 1995-1997	Cha Cha Cha	Various		
1996	Como pan caliente	Amalia		
1997	Mía sólo mía	Nelida "Nelly" Contreras		
1997	El arcangel	Soledad Guevara		
1998	Gasoleros	Dina		
1999	Trillizos ¡dijo la partera!	Herminia		
2000	Tiempo final	Viviana "Vivi"	Episodio: "El autografo"	
2000	Estación de noche	Teresa		
2001	Cancheritos	Barbara		
2001	Cuatro amigas	Cynthia		
2002	Máximo corazón	Graciela		
2004	Los de la esquina	Zulma Reyes		
2004	Mosca & Smith	Perla		
2005	Los Roldán	Mara		
2005	Floricienta	Ivonne		
2005	Botines	Mucama	Episode: "Acorralados"	
2006	Amas de casa desesperadas	Griselda		
2006	No hay 2 sin 3	Various		
2006	Palermo Hollywood Hotel	Various		
2007-2008	Patito Feo	Dorinha		
2010-2011	Alguien que me quiera	Brenda "Coca" Reinoso		
2012	El Pueblo del Pomelo Rosado	Etelvina Rosso		
2013-2014	Farsantes	Isabel de Labrápulos		
2014-2015	Guapas	Débora Spritz		
2015	Viudas e hijos del Rock & Roll	Martita Cano		
2016	Educando a Nina	Selva Juárez		
2018	La caída	Mónica		
2019	Argentina, tierra de amor y venganza	Alfreda Sforza		

=== Theatre ===
Year	Title	Role	Writer	Director	Theatre	Notes	Refs
1986	De la pupila para adentro		Vivian El Jaber	Roberto Saiz		One-woman play	
1988	El frac rojo		Carlos Gorostiza				
1988	La movida					Festival de Teatro Joven	
1988	Las papakiriaquidas			Diego González			
1988	El ojo		Luis Agustoni				
1990	Nosotras tres			Diego Kehrig	Caliban Theatre		
1991-1993	F.E.A.		Vivian El Jaber	Diego Kehrig	Liberarte	One-woman play	
1995-1996	La cantante calva		Eugène Ionesco				
1998	Fin de siglo Cabaret		Jorge Leyes				
2000	Ansata		Vivian El Jaber, Mónica Gazpio				
2001	Derechas		Bernardo Cappa	José María Muscari			
2002-2003	Té negro		Vivian El Jaber, Mónica Gazpio	Cecilia Massa	El Taller del Ángel		
2003	Pagar el pato	Roma	Dino Armas	Patricia Pisani, Graciela Balletti	El Taller del Ángel	Also performed at the International Latino Cultural Center in Chicago	
2006	El cuento del violin	Aunt	Gastón Cerana		Abasto Social Club		
2010-?	"M" El impostor		Martín Bossi	Ana Sans and Manuel Wirzt	Broadway Theatre		
2011-?	El impostor apasionado		Martín Bossi	Manuel Wirzt, Evelyn Bendjeskov	Teatro Auditorium		
2014	La nueva autoridad	Betty	Mario Segade		Teatro General San Martín		
2019	La llamada	Bernarda	Javier Ambrossi, Javier Calvo	Emiliano Dionisi	Teatro del Globo		
2022	Julio César	Kasca	Shakespeare	José María Muscari	Cine Teatro El Plata		
2023	Tootsie	Rita	Robert Horn	Mariano Demaría	Teatro Lola Membrives		

== Awards ==
In addition to the awards below, El Jaber was also nominated for Best Supporting Actress at the Hugo Awards in 2019 for La llamada.

Year	Award	Awarding body	Awarded for	Refs
1991	Bienal Arte Jóven award	City of Buenos Aires	F.E.A.	
1991	Female Revelation on TV	Sin Cortes magazine	Cha cha cha	
1993	Lápiz de Oro	Editorial Dossier	Cha cha cha	
2005	Best performance		El cuento del violin	
2007	Martín Fierro Award	Asociación de Periodistas de la Televisión y Radiofonía Argentina	Patito Feo	
2010	ACE Award	Association of Latin Entertainment Critics	M - el imposter	
2011	Estrella de mar: Comedic actress	Municipality of General Pueyrredón	"M" El impostor	
2012	Estrella de mar: Comedic actress	Municipality of General Pueyrredón	El impostor apasionado	
2013	Martín Fierro Award: Best Supporting Actress	Asociación de Periodistas de la Televisión y Radiofonía Argentina	Farsantes	
