= Mariana Fabbiani =

Argentine radio and television presenter and actress

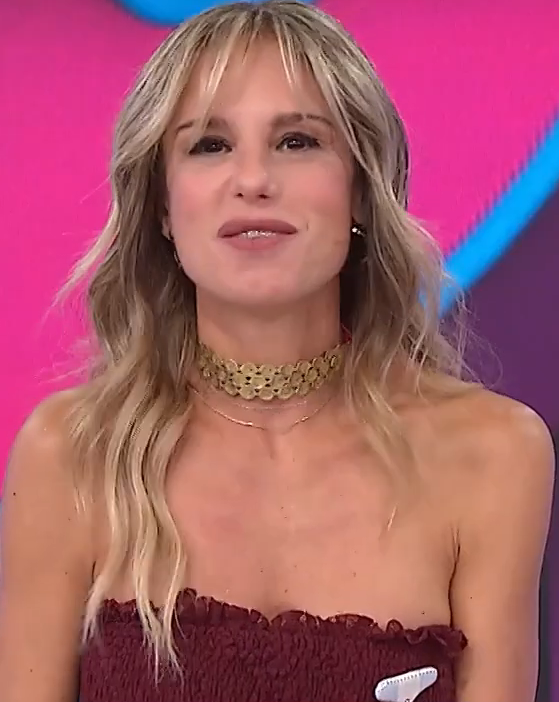
- Fabbiani in 2026
- Born: Mariana Paula Fabbiani Martínez; 8 January 1975 (age 51); Corrientes, Argentina
- Occupations: Presenter, actress, model
- Years active: 1993–present
- Spouse: Gastón Portal (2002–2004)
- Partners: Gastón Portal (1994–2002); Mariano Chihade (2006–present)
- Relatives: Nito Mores (uncle)
- Awards: Martín Fierro Award (2007, 2011, 2015, 2016)
- Presenting career
- Show: El diario de Mariana
- Station: Channel 13

Mariana Paula Fabbiani Martínez (born 8 January 1975) is an Argentine radio and television presenter and actress.

== Career ==
Mariana Fabbiani began her career as an advertising model in her native Argentina, also working in Chile and Mexico in 1988. In 1993 she starred in the music video of the song "Suave" with Luis Miguel. She began her television career in 1994 as an actress on Son de diez, and in 1996 she made appearances on Mi familia es un dibujo and Montaña rusa.

Along with Raúl Portal, she hosted the entertainment program Perdona nuestros pecados (PNP), broadcast from 1997 to 1998 by Channel 13 and from 1999 to 2001 by Telefe.

In 2000 she hosted the radio program Panic Attack, along with Mex Urtizberea and Maju Lozano on FM Supernova from 1:00 to 3:00 pm.

In 2000 and 2001 she wrote and starred in a play called Cenicienta. La historia continúa, a children's musical produced by Lino Patalano and Gastón Portal.

In 2002, Channel 13 called on her to lead a variety program aimed at a female and children's audience, Mariana de casa. On that program she also sang, and released an album of her songs. That year the program was also presented theatrically as a play aimed at children, with Mariana as a protagonist and the show's puppets as part of the cast.

In 2004 she directed El ojo cítrico (a program similar to PNP) with Luis Rubio (the author and performer of the character Éber Ludueña) on Channel 13, produced by Gastón Portal. That year she also worked as an actress, with appearances on the telenovela Los pensionados on the same channel.

In 2005, América TV hired her to host El resumen de los medios (RSM), produced by Gastón Portal.

In 2006, Telefe called on her to play her first leading role in a fiction series, and to host various television programs.

In 2013, Fabbiani returned to television, but this time on Channel 13, as host of the program El artista del año. After finishing with El artista del año, she started a political program to replace Dale la tarde, called El diario de Mariana, which is broadcast in the evenings on Channel 13.

== Personal life ==
Mariana Fabbiani's parents are Silvia Mores and Alfredo Fabbiani. She is the granddaughter of the pianist and composer Mariano Mores and the singer Myrna Mores, and niece of the singer Nito Mores. She has a sister named Paola.

Beginning in 1996 she maintained a relationship with the producer Gastón Portal, son of Raúl Portal. They were married on 15 March 2003. They announced their separation in April 2005.

Since 2006, her partner has been the producer Mariano Chihade, with whom she has two children, Matilda (born 2010) and Máximo (born 2014).

== Controversies ==
Between 4 October and 13 December 2017, the Vidal government paid the sum of almost 5.6 million pesos to the company More Televisión SA, owned by Mariana Fabbiani's husband Mariano Chihade. The payments were made from the Government Treasury, and also from the Provincial Institute of Lottery and Casinos of Buenos Aires Province, each for an amount equal to $70,000. At the same time it was discovered that Vidal paid the production company and Fabbiani's program to show the detention of an opposition deputy.

== Modeling ==
- 1992: numerous advertisements in Mexico, Chile, and Argentina
- 1993: "Suave" music video with Luis Miguel, filmed in Acapulco
- 1998: became the face of the company Garbarino in all its television, radio, and graphic advertising
- 1999: graphic campaign for the Casino of San Luis
- Host of several business events (Colgate, Nivea, BNL, Georgalos)
- 2004: TV commercials for Sensodyne and Revlon
- 2010: Commercials for Falabella

== Actress ==
- Son de diez (Channel 13, 1994)
- Mi familia es un dibujo as Maestra Jimena (Telefe, 1996)
- Montaña rusa as María José (1996)
- Los pensionados as Adriana (Channel 13, 2004)

== Discography ==
- 2000: Cenicienta...La historia continúa (EMI)
- 2002: Mariana de casa

== TV programs ==
| Year | Title | Role | Channel |
|---|---|---|---|
| 1997–1998 | Perdona nuestros pecados | Co-presenter | Channel 13 |
| 1999–2001 | Perdona nuestros pecados | Co-presenter | Telefe |
| 1998 | Móvil 13 | Co-presenter | Channel 13 |
| 2002–2003 | Mariana de casa | Presenter | Channel 13 |
| 2004 | El ojo cítrico | Co-presenter | Channel 13 |
| 2006–2008 | RAN15 | Lupita Goldenberg | América TV |
| 2005–2011 | El resumen de los medios | Presenter | América TV |
| 2013 | El artista del año | Presenter | Channel 13 |
| 2013–present | El diario de Mariana | Presenter | Channel 13 |
| 2015 | Bailando 2015 | Replacement juror | Channel 13 |

=== Galas ===
- 2006 Martín Fierro Awards, co-presenter (2007)
- 2008 Martín Fierro Awards, co-presenter (2009)
- 2011 Tato Awards, co-presenter (2011)
- 2011 Martín Fierro Awards, co-presenter (2012)
- 2012 Tato Awards, presenter (2012)
- 2013 Un sol para los chicos, co-presenter (2013)
- 2013 Tato Awards, co-presenter (2013)
- 2013 Martín Fierro Awards, co-presenter (2014)
- 2014 Martín Fierro Awards, co-presenter (2015)
- 2015 Martín Fierro Awards, co-presenter (2016)
- 2016 Martín Fierro Awards, co-presenter (2017)

== Awards ==
| Year | Award | Nominated work | Result | Ref. |
|---|---|---|---|---|
| 2003 | Martín Fierro Award for Best Woman Host | Mariana de casa | Nominated | |
| 2005 | Martín Fierro Award for Best Woman Host | El ojo cítrico | Nominated | |
| 2006 | Martín Fierro Award for Best Woman Host | El resumen de los medios | Nominated | |
| 2007 | Martín Fierro Award for Best Woman Host | El resumen de los medios | Winner | |
| 2008 | Martín Fierro Award for Best Woman Host | El resumen de los medios | Nominated | |
| 2009 | Martín Fierro Award for Best Woman Host | El resumen de los medios | Nominated | |
| 2011 | Martín Fierro Award for Best Woman Host | El resumen de los medios | Winner | |
| 2014 | Martín Fierro Award for Best Woman Host | El diario de Mariana | Nominated | |
| 2015 | Martín Fierro Award for Best Woman Host | El diario de Mariana | Winner | |
| 2016 | Martín Fierro Award for Best Woman Host | El diario de Mariana | Winner | |
| 2017 | Martín Fierro Award for Best Woman Host | El diario de Mariana | Nominated | |
