= Doce casas, historia de mujeres devotas =

- Genre: Miniserie; Drama
- Written by: Ariel Gurevich and Santiago Loza
- Directed by: Santiago Loza and Eduardo Crespo
- Creative director: Santiago Loza
- Starring: Rotating Cast
- Country of origin: Argentina
- Original language: Spanish
- No. of seasons: 1
- No. of episodes: 45

Production
- Executive producers: Ignacio Meni Battaglia and Ariel Fernández
- Producers: Iñaki Echeverría and Gustavo Villamagna
- Running time: 30 minutes
- Production companies: TV Pública and Vasko Films

Original release
- Network: TV Pública
- Release: March 31 – July 24, 2014

Doce casas, historia de mujeres devotas is a 2014 Argentine miniseries written and directed by Santiago Loza. A new fiction series produced by TV Pública and co-produced with Vasko Films, with the performance of great Argentine actresses of all generations. Its first broadcast was on March 31, 2014 which is broadcast from Monday to Thursday at 10:30 p.m. (UTC-3) on TV Pública.

== Cast ==
- 1st week - January. Story of Lidia and Ester:
- Marilú Marini as Lidia
- Claudia Lapacó as Ester
- Claudio Tolcachir as Damián

- 2nd week - February. Mercedes story:
- Rita Cortese as Mercedes
- María Inés Sancerni as Norma
- Patricio Aramburu as Esteban
- José Escobar as Mario

- 3rd week - March. Teresa's Story:
- Eva Bianco as Teresa
- Viviana Saccone as Gloria
- Marcelo Subiotto as Ricardo
- Guillermo Arengo as Julio

- 4th week - April. Magdalena's Story:
- María Marull as Magdalena
- Julia Calvo as Marta
- Martín Gross as Ramón

- 5th week - May. Aurora's son's story:
- Iván Moschner as Dalmiro
- Verónica Llinás as Estela

- 6th week - June. Dora and Marina's Story:
- Susú Pecoraro as Dora
- Julieta Zylberberg as Marina

- 7th week - July. Andrea's Story:
- Cecilia Ursi as Andrea
- Ailín Salas as Josefina
- Alejandra Flechner as Mirtha
- Martín Slipak as Pedro

- 8th week - August. Teté's Story:
- Tina Serrano as Teté
- Cristina Banegas as Rita
- Leonor Manso as Nélida

- 9th week - September. Story of Delia and Omar:
- María Onetto as Delia
- Juan Gabriel Miño as Omar
- Gaby Ferrero as Omar's mom
- Boy Olmi as Octavio

- 10th week - October. Romeo story:
- Alejandro Tantanian as Romeo
- Marco Antonio Caponi as Adolfo
- Cecilia Rosetto as Valeria
- Cecilia Rainero as María Dolores "Dolo"

- 11th week - November. Nora's Story:
- Laura Paredes as Nora
- Luisina Brando as Adela
- Esteban Meloni as Juan

- 12th week - December. Lili's Story:
- Ingrid Pelicori as Ana
- Noemí Frenkel as Amalia
- Luz Palazón as Azucena
- Emilio Bardi as Norberto

== Awards and nominations ==
Year	Award	Category	Nominees	Result
2015	2014 Martín Fierro Awards	Best miniseries	Doce casas, historia de mujeres devotas	Winner
2015	2014 Martín Fierro Awards	Best Lead Actress of miniseries	Claudia Lapacó	Winner
2015	2014 Martín Fierro Awards	Best Lead Actress of miniseries	Marilú Marini	Nominated
