= Cha Cha Cha (TV series) =

- Created by: Alfredo Casero
- Starring: Alfredo Casero, Mex Urtizberea, Fabio Alberti, Diego Capusotto, Rodolfo Samsó, Pablo Cedrón, Vivian El Jaber, Mariana Briski, Sandra Monteagudo, Daniel Marín, Gisela Gaeta, Alejandra Flechner, Jorge Takashima, Martín Pavlovsky, Lito Ming, Claudia Disti, Santiago Ríos, Iván Moschner, Romina Sznaider, Gregory Dayton
- Country of origin: Argentina

Production
- Running time: 45 minutes

Original release
- Network: América TV
- Release: 1992 – 1997

Cha Cha Cha is an Argentine sketch comedy television programme, starring Alfredo Casero, Fabio Alberti, Diego Capusotto, and others, and which was aired from 1992 to 1997 on América TV, It was characterized by absurd humour, often improvised and sometimes bordering on the surreal. The show made the actors famous, and is considered as a classic in the history of Argentine television. In 2012 it was announced by Casero that the show could return as a motion picture, but since the announcement no further developments have been made.

== History ==
The cycle began in 1992, after the separation of the group of actors that performed the television comedy show De la cabeza. The show was first known only as Cha Cha Cha; in the last three seasons, a subtitle was added. In 1995 it was Dancing en el Titanic; in 1996 El Estigma del Dr. Vaporeso; and the last season was La parrilla del Xeñor. The last program was aired on August 13, 1997, and was then cancelled because of low ratings.

Casero himself announced the cancellation of the show, and described it like this: "It had that half and half... with the guarangadas(crude, uneducated words) that we used to say... We like the refiné stuff, and we also like that funny thing of getting your fingers into mayonnaise to catch an olive." Soon afterwards, in an interview, he stated the reason for the cancellation flatly: "There's no place on television for our show... If I had a TV channel I'd fire the folks of Cha cha cha too."

== The sketches ==
The style of some sketches are similar to Monty Python's Flying Circus, making them sometimes difficult to understand. Other were parodies, such as Juan Carlos Batman, where Casero played an Argentine (and fat) version of Batman, or Siddharta Kiwi, a skinny fakir or guru performed by Diego Capusotto, who proposed unconventional solutions to everyday problems.

The most controversial sketch was Todos juntos en capilla, which came usually last of every emission. In it, Fabio Alberti played a Catholic-style priest who told supposedly edifying but ludicrous stories of a martyr saint called Peperino Pómoro. This prompted a reaction of a conservative Catholic association called Fundación Argentina del Mañana, who launched a campaign against the sketch by sending letters to the channel and the commercial sponsors, finally achieving its cancellation.

== Legacy ==
The program did not employ conventional humour and never had a massive public. In fact, it was always complicated because of low ratings. Dancing en el Titanic had to be aired live, to avoid spending extra money in studio, edition, exterior shots, etc. However, Cha Cha Cha managed to gather a fan base (some self-styled Vaporesianos), who after the cancellation of the show found an alternative in the projects on which the members of Cha Cha Cha continued working on, for example: Delicatessen, made in 1998 by Horacio Fontova, Fabio Alberti, Diego Capusotto, José Luis Oliver, Damián Dreizik and Luis Ziembrowski and aired in América TV; the theatre shows of Alfredo Casero, such as Sólo para entendidos; and Todo por dos pesos, a program by Alberti and Capusotto, aired in Canal 7 and Canal 9, which made these two actors even more popular.

Over time the Chachacha TV series has become somewhat of a fad with a younger generation of Argentines. The programs are watched even today, on the television channel Volver, or on YouTube.

== Cast ==
Cha Cha Cha
(first seasons)
- Alfredo Casero
- Fabio Alberti
- Diego Capusotto
- Vivian El Jaber
- Mex Urtizberea
- Pablo Cedrón
- Rodolfo Samsó
- Mariana Briski
- Sandra Monteagudo
Dancing en
el Titanic
- Alfredo Casero
- Fabio Alberti
- Diego Capusotto
- Vivian El Jaber
- Alejandra Flechner
- Gisela Gaeta
- Daniel Marín
- Martín Pavlovsky
- Jorge Takashima
- Gregory Dayton
El estigma del
Dr. Vaporeso
- Alfredo Casero
- Fabio Alberti
- Diego Capusotto
- Vivian El Jaber
- Daniel Marín
- Rodolfo Samsó
- Santiago Ríos
- Claudia Disti
- Jorge Takashima
- Lito Ming
La parrilla
del Xeñor
- Alfredo Casero
- Fabio Alberti
- Diego Capusotto
- Vivian El Jaber
- Romina Sznaider
- Daniel Marín
- Claudia Disti
- Iván Moschner
- Lito Ming

There were also many appearances of famous people such as Alejandro Lerner, Jorge Lanata, Enrique Macaya Márquez, Charly Alberti, Diego "Chavo" Fucks, Marcos Zucker, and even of Alfredo Casero's son, Nazareno Casero.
