= Diego Capusotto =

Argentine actor (born 1961)

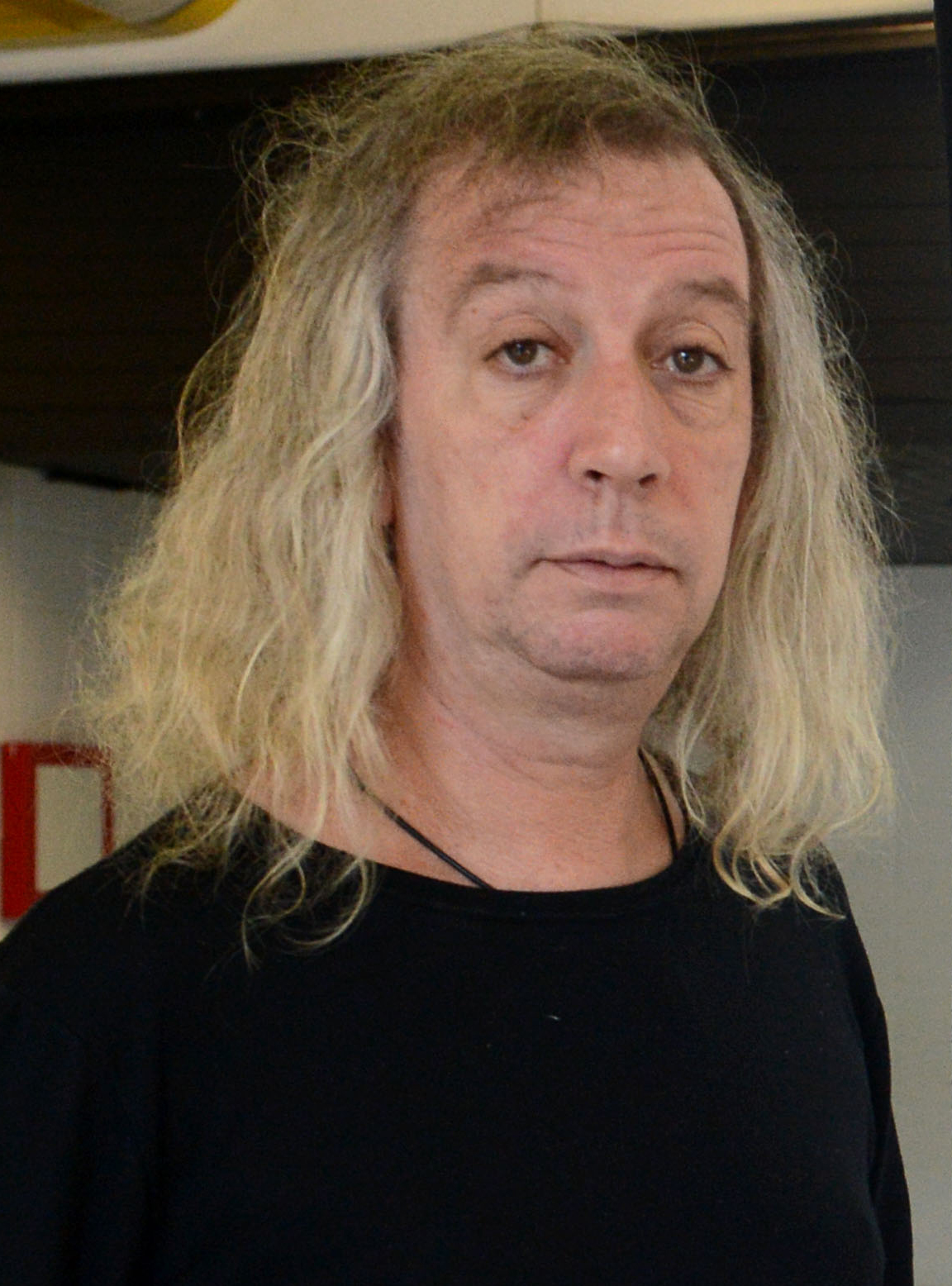
- Capusotto in 2014
- Born: Diego Esteban Capusotto; 21 September 1961 (age 63); Buenos Aires Province, Argentina
- Spouse: María Laura
- Children: 2

Diego Esteban Capusotto (born 21 September 1961) is an Argentine television presenter, actor, and comedian who is noted for his participation in television shows such as Cha Cha Cha, Todo por dos pesos and Peter Capusotto y sus videos.

== Biography ==
Capusotto was born on 21 September 1961 in Castelar, Buenos Aires Province, and moved to the Villa Luro neighborhood of Buenos Aires when he was seven, where he lived for three decades.

At 25, he began to study acting at the Arlequines Theater. He has starred in several movies. The first, Zapada, una comedia beat (1999), was not released commercially. He followed up with Mataperros (2001), India Pravile (2003), Soy tu aventura (2003), Dos ilusiones (2004) and Regresados (2007), also known as D-Graduated. His most recent film was Pajaros Volando (2010).

His television career began in 1992 with De la cabeza, a series in which he worked with actors and comedians such as Alfredo Casero, Fabio Posca, Mex Urtizberea, and Fabio Alberti. After the program was killed off by a falling out between Posca and the other actors, Capusotto teamed up with Casero and Alberti in a new comedy project, Cha Cha Cha, which was broadcast intermittently between 1992 and 1997. Capusotto and Alberti would team up again, in 1998, on the cast of the television series, Delikatessen, starring Horacio Fontova, and again in 1999 when the program Todo por dos pesos (99 Cent Store) made its debut: this program would finally establish Capusotto as an icon of Argentine comedy. For this series, in which he established some of his best and most famous characters such as "Irma Jusid", "El Hombre Bobo", and "Peter Conchas", Capusotto received the Martin Fierro Award for Comedy Performance in 2001.

Todo por dos pesos went off the air in 2002. In 2003, Capusotto played a mentally ill person in the series Sol negro, produced by Sebastián Ortega and with performances by Rodrigo de la Serna and Carlos Belloso, among others.

On 24 March 2004, Capusotto returned to the theater together with Fabio Alberti to present the comedy show Una noche en Carlos Paz, written by Pedro Saborido and directed by Néstor Montalbano, where they continued the shtick of Todo por dos pesos. The show was followed by Qué noche Bariloche, which premiered in 2006.

Up to the age of 17, Capusotto wanted to play football:

No, until I was 17 I dreamed of being a football (soccer) player. I was talented: my footwork was pretty good, and I loved to play midfield. I tried out for several clubs, but life had other plans for me, I had to settle for being a spectator and I'm a big fan of the "Racing" football team.

Capusotto was always involved with music, but he never wanted to make a career of it:

Playing drums came naturally to me. I took classes with Horacio Gianello, who played with [the group] Arco Iris (band), and I saw that while I had a gift for playing drums, I didn't love it. And to play an instrument, you have to love what you're doing.

Capusotto co-wrote and starred in the comedy plays Una noche en Carlos Paz ("A Night in Carlos Paz") and Qué noche Bariloche ("What a Night, Bariloche!"). In 2006, the television show Peter Capusotto y sus videos (Peter Capusotto and his videos), created and starring Capusotto, debuted on Rock&Pop TV (later airing on Televisión Pública, and currently airing on TBS). The humoristic program (which features rarely seen rock music videos) consists in Capusotto parodying the different facets of the rock-and-roll lifestyle in various sketches, and taking rock personalities and stereotypes for an intertwining critique of several aspects of the Argentine society and culture, with "Luis Almirante Brown (Artaud for millions)", "Pomelo, ídolo de rock" ("Pomelo, rock idol") and "Perón y rock" as some of the highlights. The program has become a cult hit, and video clips from the show are frequently viewed on YouTube.

On 17 December 2007, after Peter Capusotto y sus videos was nominated for the Clarín Awards, Capusotto received awards in the Musical Performance and Best Comedy Program categories.

On 2 July 2008, at the Martín Fierro Awards he received the award for Best Comedy Performance for Peter Capusotto and his videos. On 2009, he again received a Martín Fierro Award for Best Comedy Performance for Peter Capusotto and his videos. 2012 saw the release of Peter Capusotto y sus 3 Dimensiones ("Peter Capusotto and his Three Dimensions"), a movie based on the television show, which was quite successful at the box office.

== Personal life ==
Capusotto is married to María Laura, with whom he has two daughters: Elisa, and Eva (named after Eva Perón). He is a fan of the Racing Club soccer team. He currently resides in the Barracas, Buenos Aires.

He had two brothers, but both are deceased.

== Selected filmography ==
=== Television ===
- De la cabeza ("Crazy")
- Cha cha cha
- Delikatessen
- Todo por dos pesos ("99 cent store")
- Tiempo Final ("Final time")
- Sol Negro ("Black sun")
- Peter Capusotto y sus videos ("Peter Capusotto and his videos")

=== Film ===
- Tiempo de Descuento (time's running out) [short film]
- Zapada, una comedia beat (Zapada, a Beat comedy)
- Mataperros (thug)
- India Pravile
- Soy tu aventura (I'm your adventure)
- Dos ilusiones (two dreams/illusions)
- Regresados (known as D-Graduated internationally)
- Pájaros Volando (Birds Flying)
- Peter Capusotto y sus Tres Dimensiones (Peter Capusotto and his Three Dimensions)
- Kryptonita
- 27, El club de los malditos

== Awards ==
- 2013 Tato award as best comical work.
- 2011 Konex award - Merit Diploma as one of the 5 best TV actor of the decade in Argentina.

=== Nominations ===
- 2013 Martín Fierro Awards
  - Best work in humor
