= 52nd Martín Fierro Awards =

2024 Argentinian television and radio awards

52nd Annual Martín Fierro Awards
- Awarded for: Martín Fierro Awards for 2023 Argentine television and radio programs
- Sponsored by: Asociación de Periodistas de la Televisión y Radiofonía Argentina
- Date: September 9, 2024
- Location: Hilton Buenos Aires
- Country: Argentina
- Hosted by: Santiago del Moro
- Reward: Martín Fierro Awards

Television/radio coverage
- Network: Telefe

The 52nd Annual Martín Fierro Awards, presented by the Asociación de Periodistas de la Televisión y Radiofonía Argentina (APTRA), was held on September 9, 2024. It was held at the Hilton Buenos Aires located in Buenos Aires. During the ceremony, APTRA announced the Martín Fierro Awards for 2018 Argentine television and radio programs. The ceremony was hosted by Santiago del Moro and was broadcast on Telefe. Telefe had broadcast the previous years awards.

The nominations were announced on August 21 on the program "Cortá por Lozano". For the second consecutive time, while the red carpet was led by Iván de Pineda and Josefina "La China" Ansa.

== In Memoriam ==
Like every year, a tribute was paid to the great figures who died between July 2023 and September 2024. The artists Abel Pintos and Nahuel Pennisi were in charge of performing the song "No me olvides (Don't forget me)", while they were projected to the deceased artists:

- Marcela Ruiz
- Mónica Escudero
- Luis Vadalá
- Constancio Vigil
- Roberto Italiano
- Rubí Monserrat
- Mariano Caprarola
- Chico Novarro
- Hernán Terranova
- Rudy Carrié
- Marcelo Simón
- Gato Peters
- Vanessa Show
- Mario Wainfeld
- Carlos Defeo
- Patricia Lage
- Horacio Heredia
- Johnny Allon
- Mariana Moyano
- Martín Jáuregui
- Julia Sandoval
- Edi Zunino
- Elizabeth Makar
- Marilú Brajer
- Aldo Pastur
- Dorys Perry
- Selva Alemán
- Claudio Rissi
- Perla Santalla
- Ricardo Piñeiro
- Enzo Bai
- Lucía Labora
- Adrián Serantoni
- Félix Tornquist
- Héctor Bidonde
- Enrique Liporace
- Derli Prada
- Gabriela Lerner
- Camila Perissé
- Jorge Dorio
- José Luis Telecher
- Sebastián Olarte
- Pepe Soriano
- Miguel Bermúdez
- Omar Sánchez
- Adela Montes
- Ángela Ragno
- Mariano Muente
- Juan Carlos Kusnetzoff
- Tony Iarocci
- Luis María Serra
- Tina Serrano
- Liliana Brailovsky
- Ignacio Alonso
- Julio Gini
- Alicia Petti
- Edgardo Borda
- Ricardo Bertone
- César Menotti
- Jorge Rivera López
- Silvina Luna
