= Grego Rossello =

- Born: Gregorio Rossello; August 13, 1991 (age 34); Buenos Aires, Argentina
- Occupations: Comedian, presenter
- Years active: 2009-present

Gregorio Rossello (born 13 August 1991), better known as Grego Rossello, is an Argentine actor, comedian, presenter and internet personality. He is known for making various comedy videos about different everyday situations on the Instagram social network, for his participation in various television programs, and as a stand-up comedian.

== Life and career ==
After his debut on the big screen, at age 13, in the commercial flop Palabra por palabra, Rossello did not perform again until he began college. He trained in dramatic arts at IUNA while studying for a degree in history at Di Tella. He made numerous appearances on television shows in Argentina in the early 2010s, such as Casi Angeles, Enseñame a vivir, Sueña conmigo, Secretos de amor, Víndica and Herederos de una venganza. However, his fame came from posting short videos to the Internet.

Grego became the first comedian in the history of Argentine stand-up to present his show at the Gran Rex, which he did twice. After "a lot of effort" and several videos on Instagram, he finally reached the TV screen, where he has presented ESPN Redes (Argentina) since 2016. However, he says his journey to "success", a word he uses in reference to himself with caution, was not easy.

In 2017, he joined the historical show Polémica en el bar, starred in the movie Bruja with Erica Rivas and Pablo Rago, and took a lead role in What could happen? with Darío Lopilato.

In 2018 he presented the 2017 Martín Fierro Digital Awards with Florencia Vigna. He also hosted, with Ivana Nadal, La Voz Argentina: MTV After Hours, where he interviewed the participants, judges and coaches of the new season of La Voz... Argentina.

== Filmography ==
Year	Title	Role	Network
2007	Palabra por palabra	Acting, 'Peter'	
2009	Casi Angeles	Acting, 'Jerry'	Telefe
2009	Enseñame a vivir	Acting, 'Gregorio'	El Trece
2010	Sueña conmigo	Acting, 'Manuel'	Nickelodeon
2011	Víndica	Acting, 'Aguilar'	América TV
2012	Herederos de una venganza	Acting, 'Manuel'	El Trece
2014	Señores papis	Acting, 'Cartero'	Telefe
2016-2017	ESPN Redes	Host	ESPN
2018-present	ESPN Redes	Presenter	ESPN
2017-2018	Polémica en el bar	Panelist	America TV
2018	Premios Martín Fierro Digital 2017	Presenter	Crónica Televisión
2018	¿Qué puede pasar?	Acting, 'Peter'	
2018	#SGBonusTrack	Presenter	Telefe (Plataforma digital)
2018	La Voz Argentina: MTV After Hours	Presenter	MTV
2019	Martín Fierro 2018: La Alfombra Roja	Presenter	Telefe (Plataforma digital)
2019	Bruja	Acting, 'Paco'	
2019	Grego Rossello: Disculpe las molestias	Stand-up act	Netflix

== Theatre ==
- Ridículos (2019-present)

== Accolades ==
Awards and nominations
Year	Event	Category	Work	Result
2016	Kids' Choice Awards Argentina	Digital Revelation	El mismo	Nominated
2017	Fans Awards	"Aww" couple (with Stephanie Demner)	Ellos mismos	Nominated
2018	Premios Martín Fierro Digital	King of Social Media	El mismo	Nominated
