= Guapas =

- Top: Laura Luna (Isabel Macedo), Andrea Luna (Araceli González). Bottom: María Emilia García del Río (Carla Peterson), Mónica Duarte (Mercedes Morán) and Lorena Patricia Giménez (Florencia Bertotti)
- Genre: Dramatic comedy
- Created by: Adrián Suar
- Written by: Carolina Aguirre; Leandro Calderone
- Directed by: Daniel Barone; Lucas Gil
- Starring: Mercedes Morán; Araceli González; Carla Peterson; Isabel Macedo; Florencia Bertotti
- Theme music composer: Florencia Bertotti and Willie Lorenzo
- Opening theme: Guapas by Fabiana Cantilo
- Country of origin: Argentina
- Original language: Spanish
- No. of seasons: 1
- No. of episodes: 173

Production
- Producers: Adrián Suar; Adrián González
- Production location: Buenos Aires
- Running time: 32-63 minutes

Original release
- Network: Canal 13
- Release: March 17, 2014 – January 9, 2015

Related
- Mis amigos de siempre; Noche y día; Las Estrellas (telenovela)

Guapas is an Argentine telenovela created by Adrián Suar and produced by Pol-ka.

== Schedule ==
It was shown on Canal 13 from March 17, 2014 until January 9, 2015 at 11:00 p.m. On April 28, 2015 it moved ahead to 10:00 pm, and on August 11, it changed schedule again and began broadcasting from 9:00 p.m. Several weeks later, it moved to 9:15 p.m.

== Plot ==
In the story, Mónica (Mercedes Morán), María Emilia (Carla Peterson), Lorena (Florencia Bertotti), Laura (Isabel Macedo) and Andrea (Araceli González) meet when a bank suddenly closes and keeps the money from all of their deposits. Seven years later, the five have become close friends, but they have not yet been able to recover from that loss economically or emotionally. Together, they seek opportunities to fall in love, perform, build a family, follow career dreams, heal wounds or overcome fears. After all, they're not perfect, they're guapas.

== Production ==
All five protagonists are famous Argentinian actresses and most of them had worked together at previous telenovelas. Although they are not personal friends, they commented that they have no problems working together, and do not foresee any internal problems like those suffered by Farsantes. Farsantes, the previous telenovela, had fights between the actors that led many of them to leave it before its conclusion. The actress Mercedes Morán is the mother of the actress Mercedes Scápola, and their characters are mother and daughter in the plot as well. Morán had encouraged her daughter to have her own acting career, and made a cameo with her in the 2012 telenovela Graduados. Both of them felt that Guapas was the appropriate time for a steady joint work. Morán's character and that played by Dady Brieva are a couple; both actors had been lead actors in a previous telenovela, Gasoleros.

Actress Araceli González returned to Pol-ka for this production. She was the lead actress of Carola Casini, one of the first telenovelas by Pol-ka. She was married with Adrián Suar, president of Pol-ka, by then; they divorced and now both of them are married with other people. González commented that she had known the company when it was just a medium enterprise, and that she has several relatives working in it.

== Reception ==
The telenovela's main competitor is Sres. Papis, a telenovela aired by Telefe, with a mainly male cast. On the first day it was aired, Guapas got 16.3 rating points, against 12 points for Sres. Papis.

== Cast ==
- Mercedes Morán as Mónica Duarte
- Carla Peterson as María Emilia "Mey" García del Río
- Florencia Bertotti as Lorena Patricia Giménez
- Araceli González as Andrea Luna
- Isabel Macedo as Laura Luna
- Esteban Lamothe as Pablo González
- Mike Amigorena as Federico Müller
- Muriel Santa Ana as Reina Suárez
- Vivian El Jaber as Débora Spritz
- Fabiana Cantilo as Alejandra Rey
- Alfredo Casero as Oscar Falcón
- Adrián Suar as Javier "Facha" Salvatierra
- Mercedes Scápola as Natalia Diez
- Julieta Zylberberg as Sol Rodríguez Alcorta
- Carlos Belloso as Carlos Braverman
- Nicolás Repetto as Leonardo Zavala
- Alberto Fernández de Rosa as Coco Luna
- Carlos Mena as Dr. Müller
- Ignacio Huang as Ricardo
- Marilú Marini as Amalia
- Rafael Spregelburd as Mariano
- Thelma Fardin as Catalina's friend
- Rafael Ferro as Francisco Laprida
- Mauricio Dayub as Alejandro Rey
- Alberto Ajaka as Rubén D'Onofrio
- Dady Brieva as Mario "Tano" Manfredi
- Inés Estévez as Silvia Torrese
- Natalie Pérez as Cinthia Miguens
- Dan Breitman as Ignacio Lynch
- Andrea Bonelli as Federica Goldman
- Franco Bruzzone as Mateo Manfredi
- Gaby Ferrero as Norma Patricia Pérez Vda. de Giménez
- Sofía González Gil as Catalina Rey
- Gerardo Otero as Juan Cardales
- Javier De Nevares as José Pablo García del Río
- Dalma Maradona as Verónica "Lavalle" Cuello
- Federico Olivera as Ernesto
- Dalia Elnecave as Blanca
- Valeria Lois as Claudia
- Paula Kohan as Flavia
- Paloma Contreras as Ivana
- Melania Lenoir as Marina
- Iair Said as Roly

== Awards and nominations ==
Year	Award	Category	Nominees	Result
2015	Martín Fierro Awards	Best Daily Fiction	Guapas	Winner
2015	Martín Fierro Awards	Best Actress in Daily Fiction	Mercedes Morán	Nominated
2015	Martín Fierro Awards	Best Actress in Daily Fiction	Araceli González	Nominated
2015	Martín Fierro Awards	Best Actress in Daily Fiction	Isabel Macedo	Nominated
2015	Martín Fierro Awards	Best Actress in Daily Fiction	Carla Peterson	Winner
2015	Martín Fierro Awards	Best Supporting Actor	Alberto Ajaka	Winner
2015	Martín Fierro Awards	Best Supporting Actress	Julieta Zylberberg	Nominated
2015	Martín Fierro Awards	Revelation	Dan Breitman	Winner
2015	Martín Fierro Awards	Best Director	Daniel Barone and Lucas Gil	Winner
2015	Martín Fierro Awards	Best Author	Carolina Aguirre and Leandro Calderone	Winner
2015	Martín Fierro Awards	Best Musical Curtain	Guapas by Fabiana Cantilo	Winner
2015	Martín Fierro Awards	Martín Fierro de Oro	Guapas	Winner
