= Farsantes =

- From left to right: Alberto Marini (Facundo Arana), Pedro Beggio (Benjamín Vicuña), Guillermo Graziani (Julio Chávez), Gabriela Soria (Griselda Siciliani), Marcos Labrapoulos (Alfredo Casero)
- Genre: Legal drama, Police procedural
- Written by: Mario Segade and Carolina Aguirre
- Directed by: Daniel Barone and Jorge Bechara
- Starring: Julio Chávez; Facundo Arana; Griselda Siciliani; Benjamín Vicuña; Alfredo Casero
- Theme music composer: Vicentico
- Opening theme: "Puro Teatro"
- Country of origin: Argentina
- Original language: Spanish
- No. of seasons: 1
- No. of episodes: 125

Production
- Producer: Pol-ka

Original release
- Network: El Trece
- Release: June 26, 2013 – February 12, 2014

Related
- Sos mi hombre; Guapas

Farsantes (Spanish: The bluffers) is a 2013 Argentine legal drama. The main actors are Julio Chávez, Facundo Arana, Griselda Siciliani, Benjamín Vicuña and Alfredo Casero.

== Premise ==
Farsantes is a legal drama concerning a law firm located in Greater Buenos Aires. It fills the timeslot of the telenovela Sos mi hombre. It was initially conceived as a miniseries, but as the host show Showmatch did not have a 2013 edition, it was expanded into a regular telenovela. The series is written by Mario Segade and Carolina Aguirre and directed by Daniel Barone and Jorge Bechara.

The cast is composed of many notable actors, including Julio Chávez, Griselda Siciliani, Benjamín Vicuña, Leonor Manso, Gabriela Toscano and Facundo Arana. Arana received proposals from both El Trece and Telefe. Telefe had proposed that he work in a telenovela with Pablo Echarri; he finally chose to work for El Trece. Actors Gonzalo Heredia and Joaquín Furriel were proposed as cast members during the early stages of production, but declined to stay in the project. Furriel's character was finally played by Benjamín Vicuña.

Actress Griselda Siciliani suffered a bone fracture during filming. Facundo Arana, who was being filmed struggling with a pair of extras and with Siciliani next to him, pushed her by accident. She was taken to the hospital "Sanatorio de la Trinidad", and received an orthopedic cast for a couple of months. The actress confirmed that the fracture was the result of an accident, and subsequent filming managed to hide her orthopedic cast.

== Plot ==
Guillermo Graziani (Julio Chávez) is a lawyer who establishes a new law firm in the Greater Buenos Aires, after serving a time unable to work as a lawyer. He is gay, but stays married with Ana (Ingrid Pelicori) to conceal his homosexuality. He has a crush on fellow lawyer Pedro (Benjamín Vicuña), who is married to Camila (Julieta Cardinali). Alberto Marini (Facundo Arana) is a former prisoner, and the other lawyers of the firm are Marcos (Alfredo Casero) and Gabriela (Griselda Siciliani).

== Reception ==
The 2013 prime time of Argentine television is highly disputed by the channels El Trece and Telefe. El Trece airs Solamente Vos and Farsantes, and Telefe airs Los Vecinos en Guerra and Celebrity Splash!, both channels with similar ratings.

=== Awards ===
- 2013 Tato Awards
  - Best direction in fiction (Daniel Barone)
  - Best production in fiction
  - Best lead actor in drama (Julio Chávez)
  - Best daily fiction
- 2013 Martín Fierro Awards
  - Golden Martín Fierro Award
  - Best daily fiction
  - Best actor of daily drama (Julio Chávez)
  - Best actress of daily drama (Griselda Siciliani)

=== Nominations ===
- 2013 Martín Fierro Awards
  - Best actor of daily drama (Alfredo Casero)
  - Best actor of daily drama (Benjamín Vicuña)
  - Best actor of daily drama (Facundo Arana)
  - Best secondary actor (Mario Pasik)
  - Best secondary actress (Julieta Zylberberg, Vivian El Jaber)
  - Best new actor or actress (María Luján Lamas)
  - Best scripts
  - Best director
  - Best opening theme

== Cast ==
=== Main actors ===
- Julio Chávez as Guillermo Graziani
- Facundo Arana as Alberto Marini
- Griselda Siciliani as Gabriela Soria
- Benjamín Vicuña as Pedro Beggio †
- Alfredo Casero as Marcos Labrapoulos

=== Secondary actors ===
- Leonor Manso as Aída
- Edda Díaz as Cuca
- Mario Pasik as Miguel Ángel
- Ingrid Pelicori as Ana
- Julieta Zylberberg as Sonia
- Julieta Cardinali as Camila
- Pilar Gamboa as Paola
- Romina Ricci as Nancy
- Chino Darín as Fabián
- Vivian El Jaber as Isabel
- Esteban Lamothe as Antonio
