= Alfredo Casero =

Argentine musician, actor and comedian

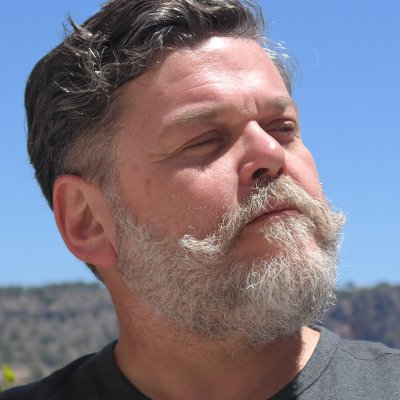
- Casero in 2016
- Born: 12 November 1962 (age 63); Vicente López, Buenos Aires, Argentina
- Occupations: Actor, musician, comedian
- Years active: 1987–present

Alfredo Casero (born 12 November 1962) is an Argentine musician, actor and comedian.

== Biography ==
Casero began studying acting with Norman Briski in 1987. Soon after, he started working in the underground humour scene of Buenos Aires. In 1992 he created, along with other humorists, the comic show De la cabeza ("Out of our minds"), which later continued as Cha Cha Cha in 1995. In parallel with the television show he started working in his musical project and also in a radio show.

The cancellation of Cha Cha Cha in 1997 marked the end of characters such as Manhattan Ruiz, Minister of Postal Ahorro. Delicatessen, Todo por dos pesos and Peter Capusotto y sus videos were shows that took much of the former Cha Cha Cha and De la Cabeza, including many actors.

He became better known outside of his country in 2002 when he recorded a Japanese song, "Shima Uta", entirely in Japanese. It was the first single from his album Casaerius. The song was chosen as the anthem for Argentina's national football team to represent the country at the 2002 FIFA World Cup, in South Korea and Japan.

In 2004 Casero played the character Roque Rizzutti in the Argentine soap Locas de amor.

He was featured, along with Japanese rock band The Boom (authors of "Shima Uta") and Japanese-Argentine folk singer Claudia Oshiro on the Japanese New Year's Eve television show, Kōhaku Uta Gassen, in its 53rd edition (New Year's Eve, December 2002).

Since then he has been devoted to the "Casero Experimendo", an experiment of blogging, humour and theater presentations, all based on improvisation.

== Filmography ==
Year	Work	Role
1991/2	De la cabeza	Various
1993	Cha cha cha	Various
1993	Encuentros lejanos (Short)	
1995	Nico (TV series)	Anjelica Conchaforte de Pocahontas
1999	Vulnerables	Roberto Chitti
1999	Casero en castellano	Personaje desconocido
2000	Los Pintin al rescate	Cacho
2000	Felicidades	Freddy
2001	Culpables	Aníbal
2001	Antigua vida mía	Alejandro
2002	Todas las azafatas van al cielo	Julián
2003	El día que me amen	Cheche
2004	Locas de amor	Roque Rizzutti
2005	Condón Express	Negro
2005	Lifting de corazón	Taxista
2005	Sin código	'Rolo' Wazerman
2006	Rolo y Colo en: No te hagas la cabeza	Voz
2006	A Todo Culorr	
2008	Gigantes de Valdés	Capitán Mórelo
2009	Tratame bien	Nacho
2011	Adan Y eva	Embajador Spruille Braden
2012	La Dueña	Oliverio
2013	Farsantes	Marcos
2017	El fútbol o yo	Roca

== Awards ==
=== Music ===
Year	Nominated work	Award	Category	Result	Ref.
2002	Casaerius	Premios Gardel	Best Production	Won	
2002	Casaerius	Premios Gardel	Best New Artist	Won (declined)	
2002	Casaerius	Premios Gardel	Best Video	Won	
2002	Shimauta	Premios Gardel	Best Song	Won	

=== Film and television ===
Year	Nominated work	Award	Category	Result	Ref.
2001	Culpables	Premio Clarín	Best actor	Won	
2001		Premio Konex	Honorable Mention: Best Actor	Won	
2003	El día que me amen	Premio Clarín	Best supporting actor	Won	
2004	Locas de amor	Martín Fierro Awards	Best actor (Miniseries)	Won	
2004		Premio Konex	Honorable Mention: Television Actor	Won	
2014	Farsantes	Martín Fierro Awards	Best actor	Nominated	
