= Mercedes Scápola =

Argentine actress

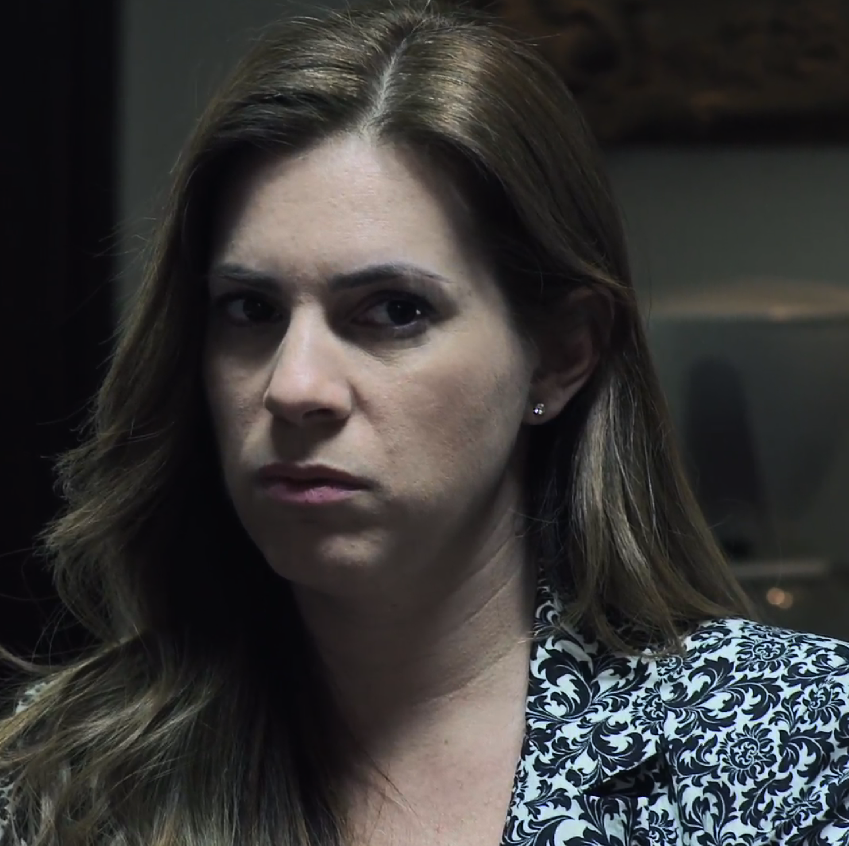
- Born: Mercedes Gloria Scápola Morán; April 25, 1975 (age 51); Buenos Aires, Argentina
- Other name: Mey Scapola
- Occupation: Actress
- Years active: 1995–present
- Children: León Castro (b. 2013)
- Parent(s): Oscar Scápola and Mercedes Morán
- Relatives: María Scápola (sister); Manuela Martínez (sister)

Mercedes Gloria Scápola Morán (born April 25, 1975 in Buenos Aires, Argentina) is an Argentine actress. She became famous thanks to the 2012 soap opera Graduados and the 2014 soap opera Guapas, both telenovelas. She is the daughter of actress Mercedes Morán.

== Biography ==
Mercedes Scápola Morán is the daughter of actress Mercedes Morán. She studied theatre under Agustín Alezzo and Julio Chávez. She ceased using the last name "Morán" to avoid being confused with her mother, who already was a famous actress.

== Career ==
She worked in the successful 2012 soap opera Graduados, playing housekeeper "Clarita." She joined the cast when the production was almost completed, and received a character that the writers initially considered a minor one. Her character was drafted as a humble Paraguayan; Scápola proposed instead to make it a native of the Córdoba Province, and always fussing about the house's condition. As it was her first major success in television and she did not spoof the slang from the Córdoba Province, and many fans mistook her for an actual native of the province. She was fluent in slang because her grandparents lived in that province, and she had already tried for it the film Rancho aparte. Mercedes Morán made a brief cameo in that soap opera as the mother of her character. Scápola got pregnant during the airing of the program, so the scripts made her character become pregnant as well. Her son León was born in 2013. Scápola returned to work in the 2014 soap opera Guapas. Her mother Mercedes Morán works in it as well. As they both enjoyed the cameo in Graduados, their characters are again mother and daughter within the plot.

== Filmography ==
=== Television ===
Year	Title	Character	Channel
1995	Amigovios		Canal 13
1998	Gasoleros	Teresa	Canal 13
2005	Amarte así	Olga Rellan	Telemundo/Canal 13
2006	Amas de casa desesperadas	Sonia Mitre	Canal 13
2009	Epitafios	Serena	HBO/Canal 13
2010	Secretos de amor	Cora	Telefe
2011	El pacto	Sofía Braille	América TV
2012	Graduados	Clara Acuña	Telefe
2014	La celebración	Clara	Telefe
2014-2015	Guapas	Natalia Diez	Canal 13
2015	Variaciones Walsh	Angélica Lerner	TV Pública
2015	El mal menor	Mercedes "Mechi".	TV Pública
2016	El marginal	Betina	Televisión Pública
2016	Educando a Nina	Milagros Alonso Sánchez	Telefe
2018	Simona	Ángeles "Angie" Buero	Canal 13

=== Movies ===
Year	Movie	Character	Director
2007	Rancho aparte	Susana	Edi Flehner
2009	Anita	Nati	Marcos Carnevale
2010	Dormir al sol	Paula	Alejandro Chomski
2013	Bienvenido Brian	Jacky	Federico Palazzo
2018	The Queen of Fear	Depiladora	Valeria Bertuccelli

=== Theater ===
Year	Title	Character	Director	Theater
2010	Amor, dolor y que me pongo			
2015	Bajo terapia			

== Awards ==
Year	Award	Category	Work	Result
2008	Malaga Festival	Best Actress	Rancho aparte	Winner
2008	Sur Awards	Female Revelation	Rancho aparte	Nominated
2008	Clarín Awards	Female Revelation	Rancho aparte	Nominated
2012	Tato Awards	Revelation	Graduados	Nominated

=== Nominations ===
- Nominated for the Tato Award 2009 as new actress
