= The Invisible Eye =

- Film poster
- Spanish: La mirada invisible
- Directed by: Diego Lerman
- Starring: Julieta Zylberberg; Osmar Núñez
- Release date: 14 May 2010 (Cannes)
- Running time: 97 minutes
- Countries: Argentina; France; Spain
- Language: Spanish

The Invisible Eye (Spanish: La mirada invisible) is a 2010 international coproduction drama film directed by Diego Lerman. The film was screened at the Directors' Fortnight event of the 2010 Cannes Film Festival.

== Cast ==
- Julieta Zylberberg as María Teresa Cornejo
- Osmar Núñez as Señor Biasutto
- Marta Lubos as Adela
