= The Damned (2009 film) =

- Spanish: Los condenados
- Directed by: Isaki Lacuesta
- Screenplay by: Isaki Lacuesta; Isa Campo
- Produced by: Xavier Atance
- Starring: Daniel Fanego; Arturo Goetz; María Fiorentino; Leonor Manso; Nazareno Casero; Juana Hidalgo; Bárbara Lennie
- Cinematography: Diego Dussuel
- Edited by: Domi Parra
- Music by: Gerard Gil
- Production company: Benecé Produccions
- Distributed by: Barton Films
- Release dates: 25 September 2009 (Zinemaldia); 20 November 2009 (Spain)
- Country: Spain
- Language: Spanish

The Damned (Spanish: Los condenados) is a 2009 Spanish drama film directed by Isaki Lacuesta from a screenplay by Lacuesta and Isa Campo. Its cast features Daniel Fanego, Arturo Goetz, María Fiorentino, Leonor Manso, Nazareno Casero, Juana Hidalgo, and Bárbara Lennie.

== Plot ==
Former guerrilla fighter Raúl recalls former pal Martín to South America from the latter's Spanish exile after 30 years. Raúl is trying to find the corpse of a common partner, Ezequiel.

== Cast ==
- Arturo Goetz as Raúl
- Daniel Fanego as Martín
- Leonor Manso as Andrea
- Juana Hidalgo as Luisa
- Nazareno Casero as Pablo
- Bárbara Lennie as Silvia
- María Fiorentino as Vicky

== Production ==
The film was produced by Benecé Produccions in association with Televisió de Catalunya, and with the participation of TVE. It was shot in Argentina, Peru, and Spain (including Barcelona).

== Release ==
The film screened at the 57th San Sebastián International Film Festival on 25 September 2022, closing the festival's official selection slate. It was theatrically released in Spain on 20 November 2009.

== Reception ==
Jonathan Holland of Variety deemed The Damned to be "hushed, intense and admirable", pointing out that "silence speaks louder than words" in the film.

Sergi Sánchez of Fotogramas rated the film 4 out of 5 stars, highlighting a couple of tremendous sequence shots as the film's standout, while citing a scene with Nazareno's character shooting an animal as a negative point.

Toni Vall of Cinemanía rated the film 3 out of 5 stars, deeming it to be a "an abrupt, imperfect and somewhat emphatic film, but undoubtedly interesting".

== Accolades ==
Year	Award	Category	Nominee(s)	Result	Ref.
2009	57th San Sebastián International Film Festival	FIPRESCI Award		Won	
2010	2nd Gaudí Awards	Best Film Not in the Catalan Language		Won	
2010	54th Sant Jordi Awards	Best Spanish Actress	Bárbara Lennie	Won	

== See also ==
- List of Spanish films of 2009
