= Filmoteca, temas de cine =

Filmoteca, temas de cine is an Argentine television program. Airing since 2006, it broadcasts and talks about the cinema of Argentina and world cinema, as well as Classic Hollywood films and cult films. It also covers a large amount of genres and film themes.

== Awards ==
=== Nominations ===
- 2015 Martín Fierro Awards: Best cultural program.
