= The Penguin Lessons (book) =

2015 memoir by Tom Michell

The Penguin Lessons: What I Learned from a Remarkable Bird
- Author: Tom Michell
- Language: English
- Genre: Memoir, nature writing
- Publisher: Ballantine Books (US), Penguin Books (UK)
- Publication date: October 27, 2015 (US); June 16, 2016 (UK)
- Publication place: United Kingdom
- Pages: 240

The Penguin Lessons: What I Learned from a Remarkable Bird is a 2015 memoir by British author Tom Michell. The book recounts Michell's experiences in 1975, when he rescued a Magellanic penguin from an oil spill in Uruguay and brought it back to a boarding school in Argentina, where he was teaching. The penguin, named Juan Salvador, became a beloved figure among the students and staff.

== Background ==
In 1975, Tom Michell, then a 23-year-old Englishman, was working as a teacher at a prestigious boys' boarding school in Buenos Aires, Argentina. During a weekend trip to Punta del Este, Uruguay, he came across a beach strewn with dead Magellanic penguins affected by an oil spill. Among the corpses, Michell found one surviving penguin. He cleaned the bird and attempted to return it to the sea, but it refused to leave his side.

Michell subsequently smuggled the penguin across the Argentine border and into the school where he worked. The penguin, later named Juan Salvador, was adopted by the school community and became a cherished companion.

== Synopsis ==
The memoir describes the development of the relationship between Michell and Juan Salvador. The penguin becomes an integral part of the school, serving as the rugby team's mascot and even joining Michell during swimming sessions. The story unfolds against the backdrop of Argentina's economic and political instability in the 1970s, providing a poignant contrast between national unrest and the simple comfort the penguin brings.

Michell eventually faces the emotional decision of releasing Juan Salvador back into the wild, marking a bittersweet conclusion to their time together.

== Reception ==
The Penguin Lessons received positive reviews. Publishers Weekly described it as a "lively and endearing memoir". The Guardian called it “heartwarmingly eccentric” and praised its charm. It was endorsed by Michael Bond, the creator of Paddington Bear.

== Film adaptation ==
In 2024, the memoir was adapted into a feature film titled The Penguin Lessons, directed by Peter Cattaneo and written by Jeff Pope. Steve Coogan starred as Tom Michell. The film premiered at the 2024 Toronto International Film Festival and was released theatrically in early 2025.

== Editions ==
Edition	Publication date	ISBN
US hardcover	October 27, 2015	978–1101967416
UK paperback	June 16, 2016	978–1405921800
