= Julieta Zylberberg =

Argentine actress

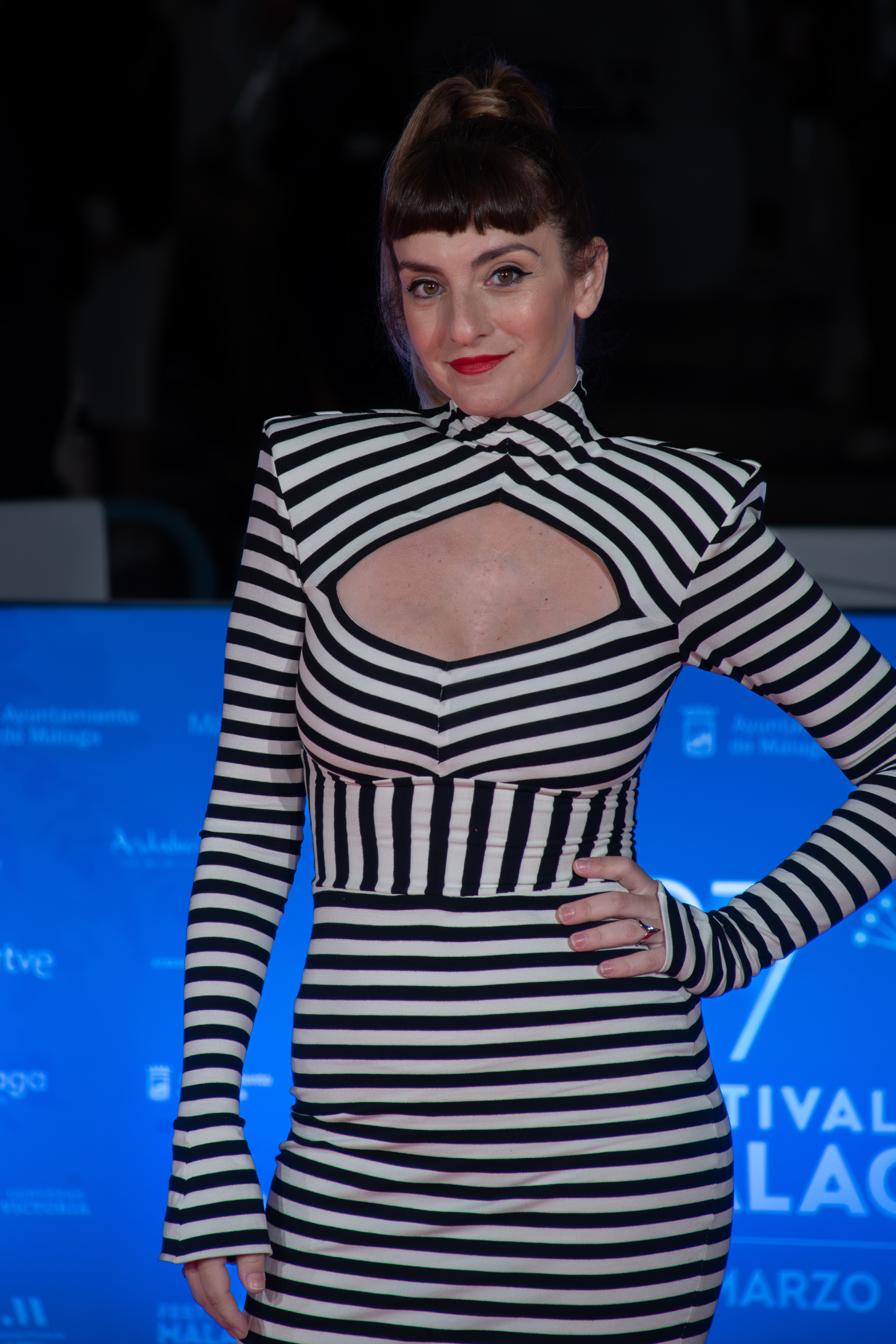
- Zylberberg in 2024
- Born: March 4, 1983 (age 43); Buenos Aires, Argentina
- Occupation: Actress
- Years active: 1995–present
- Partner(s): Esteban Lamothe (2007–2017); Agustín Toscano (2018–present)
- Children: 2

Julieta Zylberberg (born March 4, 1983) is an Argentine actress.

== Career ==
Julieta Zylberberg began her career in the children's television program Magazine For Fai, hosted by Mex Urtizberea. In that year she was also in the first chapter of the television series Culpable de este amor and appeared in the miniseries Sangre fría. Then in 2005 she participated in the film Géminis and played several roles in some episodes of the first season of Casados con hijos. In 2006 she participated in the film Cara de queso and on the television show Bendita vida. A year later, she starred in the film Tres minutos with Nicolás Pauls and Antonella Costa. In 2008, she acted in comedy Una de dos which started on January 28, 2008 and ended on February 21, 2008 by low rating. Because of this, Julieta was left without work, until she was called to make a special participation in the series Aquí no hay quien viva, adaptation of the Spanish version. In that same year, she participated in the miniseries of television and Internet Amanda O.

In 2009 she starred in the Pol-ka telecomedy Enseñame a vivir with Violeta Urtizberea. In 2010, she starred in the movie La mirada invisible and participated in the play Agosto: Condado de Osage working alongside great actresses like Norma Aleandro and Mercedes Morán. A year later, she had a role in the movie Los Marziano starring Guillermo Francella and then played Helena Epstein in the Pol-Ka Producciones televisión series, called Los únicos. In 2012 she acted in Condicionados and starred in the movie Extraños en la noche with the singer and actor Diego Torres. After four years, in 2016, she starred alongside Juan Minujín, Loco x Vos an Argentine comedy, version of the American Mad About You that was broadcast by Telefe.

In 2022, Zylberberg appeared in the science fiction series Night Sky.

== Personal life ==
She was in a relationship from 2007 with actor Esteban Lamothe. On December 8, 2012, she gave birth to the couple's first child, a boy, whom they called Luis Ernesto Lamothe Zylberberg. On May 31, 2017 Lamothe confirmed their separation.

Since 2018, she has been in a relationship with film director Agustín Toscano. On December 1, 2023, she gave birth to her second child, Florián Toscano Zylberberg, and first child with Toscano.

== Filmography ==
=== Television programs ===
Year	Program	Channel	Notes
1995-1996	Magazine For Fai	Cablín	
2006-2008	Mañana Vemos	TV Pública	

=== Film ===
Year	Movie	Character	Director
2004	The Holy Girl	Josefina	Lucrecia Martel
2005	Géminis	Montse	Albertina Carri
2006	Cara de queso	Romina	Ariel Winograd
2007	Tres minutos	Ana	Diego Lublinsky
2008	Un novio para mi mujer	María	Juan Taratuto
2010	The Invisible Eye	María Teresa	Diego Lerman
2011	Los Marziano	Natalia	Ana Katz
2012	Extraños en la noche	Sol	Alejandro Montiel
2014	Wild Tales	Girl	Damián Szifron
2015	My Friend from the Park	Liz	Ana Katz
2016	The Tenth Man	Eva	Daniel Burman
2018	Las olas		Adrián Biniez
2018	All Inclusive	Lucía	Diego Levy and Pablo Levy
2018	Aire	Lucía	Arturo Castro Godoy
2018	My Tender Matador		Rodrigo Sepúlveda
2019	La estrella roja		Gabriel Lichman
2023	The Rescue: The Weight of the World	Silvia	Daniela Goggi
2025	27 Nights		Daniel Hendler

=== Television ===
Year	Title	Character	Channel
2004	Culpable de este amor	Sasha	Telefe
2004	Sangre fría	Lea Aguirre	Telefe
2005	Conflictos en red		Telefe
2005	Casados con Hijos	Paola's friend/Roxana/Sonia	Telefe
2006	Bendita vida	Herself	Canal 9
2006	Gladiadores de Pompeya	Romina	Canal 9
2008	Una de dos	Violeta	Telefe
2008	Aquí no hay quien viva	Marisol Lepanto	Telefe
2008	Amanda O	Inés	América TV
2009	Enseñame a vivir	Clodine Fernández Salgueiro/Lorena Beatriz Benítez	Canal 13
2011	Los únicos	Helena Epstein	Canal 13
2012	Condicionados	Charo	Canal 13
2013	Farsantes	Sonia	Canal 13
2014	En terapia	Nancy	TV Pública
2014	Doce casas, Historia de mujeres devotas	Marina	TV Pública
2014	Guapas	Sol Rodríguez Alcorta	Canal 13
2015	Los siete locos y los lanzallamas	Hipólita	TV Pública
2015	Dispuesto a todo	Abril	Canal 13
2016	Educando a Nina	Lola Benítez	Telefe
2016-2018	Psiconautas	Jessica	TBS Very Funny
2016-2018	Loco por vos	Natalia "Nati" Armendaris de Wainstein	Telefe
2017-2019	El jardín de bronce	Oficial Lidia Blanco	HBO
2018	100 días para enamorarse	Pato	Telefe
2018	Oro negro		
2018	Edha	Paloma	Netflix
2018-2019	Impuros, Hasta que la Muerte los Separe		FOX
2019	Post mordem		StoryLab
2020	Separadas	Paula Kaplan	Canal 13
2022	Night Sky	Stella	Amazon Prime
2026	Yiya		

=== Theatre ===
Year	Title	Character	Director
	Lucro cesante		Ana Katz
	Versiones I: Madre de lobo entrerriano		Ana Katz
	Un enemigo del pueblo		Sergio Renán
	Gente favorita		Matías Umpierrez
	Agosto: Condado de Osage		Claudio Tolcachir
	Los únicos		Marcos Carnevale

== Awards and nominations ==
Year	Award	Category	Work	Result
2004	Clarín Awards	Female Revelation in Movie	The Holy Girl	Winner
2005	Silver Condor Awards	Best Supporting Actress	The Holy Girl	Nominated
2009	Clarín Awards	Female Revelation in Theater	Agosto: Condado de Osage	Nominated
2009	Clarín Awards	Female Revelation in Television	Enseñame a vivir	Winner
2010	Sur Awards	Female Revelation	The Invisible Eye	Winner
2010	Sur Awards	Best Actress	The Invisible Eye	Nominated
2011	Silver Condor Awards	Best Actress	The Invisible Eye	Winner
