= The Penguin Lessons =

2024 comedy-drama film

- Theatrical release poster
- Directed by: Peter Cattaneo
- Screenplay by: Jeff Pope
- Based on: The Penguin Lessons by Tom Michell
- Produced by: Rory Aitken; Adrián Guerra; Andrew Noble; Ben Pugh; Robert Walak
- Starring: Steve Coogan; Jonathan Pryce; Vivian El Jaber; Björn Gustafsson
- Cinematography: Xavi Giménez
- Edited by: Robin Peters; Tariq Anwar
- Music by: Federico Jusid
- Production companies: Intake Films; Rolling Dice; 42; Nostromo Pictures; Aperture Media Partners
- Distributed by: Lionsgate (United Kingdom and Ireland); Nostromo Pictures (Spain)
- Release dates: 6 September 2024 (TIFF); 18 April 2025 (UK)
- Running time: 112 minutes
- Countries: United Kingdom; Spain
- Languages: English; Spanish
- Box office: $14.2 million

The Penguin Lessons is a 2024 comedy-drama film directed by Peter Cattaneo and starring Steve Coogan and Jonathan Pryce.

The film premiered at the Toronto International Film Festival on 6 September 2024, before being released in cinemas in the U.S. and UK on 28 March and 18 April 2025, respectively.

== Inspiration ==
The script was adapted by Jeff Pope from Tom Michell's memoir of the same name, published in 2015.

Tom Michell's 2015 memoir chronicles his experience as a British teacher who travelled to South America to teach at a boys' boarding school in Argentina in the 1970s. On a trip to Uruguay, he visited a beach in the Uruguayan resort of Punta del Este where he stumbled on many dead penguins soaked with oil. He noticed one penguin still alive, and so he decided to rescue it, bringing it to his hotel to clean and feed it. After that, the penguin would not leave him and kept following him; eventually he took it back to the school, where it became a popular pet.

== Plot ==
Disillusioned itinerant educator Tom Michell arrives at St. George's College, an exclusive boys' school in Argentina, to teach English and coach rugby. He befriends his housekeeper María, her granddaughter Sofia, a political activist protesting the escalating 1976 Argentine coup d'état, and St. George's science teacher Tapio. Despite Headmaster Buckle's full confidence in Michell's background, the latter struggles to keep his class attentive and well-behaved.

Following the coup d'état, students are sent home for a week. Michell and Tapio decide to take a trip to Punta del Este, Uruguay in their newfound free time. Michell meets a woman named Carina at a dance club, and they find an oil slick on the beach that has killed several Magellanic penguins, except for one. They take the surviving penguin to his hotel room to clean it in the bathtub. The two share an intimate moment but Carina amicably rejects Michell, admitting she is married.

Michell's attempts to release the penguin to the ocean result in it returning to him. Every time he tries to leave it behind, other people insist he accept responsibility, even under threat of arrest. So, Michell reluctantly smuggles it back to St. George's, and contacts a zoo. Upon observing the zoo's horrid conditions, he resolves to adopt the penguin, naming it Juan Salvador (after the Spanish translation of the short story Jonathan Livingston Seagull).

María and Sofia are charmed by the penguin, leading Michell to introduce Juan Salvador to his class, which succeeds in making them pay attention and excel in their studies. Michell bonds more with his students, permitting them to feed Juan Salvador fish while urging them to keep it secret from Buckle. Tapio also meets the penguin and has a personal conversation with it.

In the city, Michell witnesses Sofia being kidnapped by Argentine authorities for her activism. Visiting a grieving María at her home, Michell learns she will protest for Sofia's release and, touched by her strong family bond, he shares that he lost his teenage daughter to a car accident, which then caused a rift in his marriage. He confesses to María that he saw Sofia being taken away yet did nothing.

Buckle learns of Juan Salvador and, enforcing strict policies, orders Michell to leave St. George's. Michell confronts the militant that ordered Sofia's kidnapping and presses him to release her. He is promptly arrested and beaten, later bailed out by Tapio. Following the incident, Buckle reconsiders firing Michell, admitting that Juan Salvador's presence has positively affected the staff and student body, even having a personal talk with it himself. Juan Salvador is granted a swim in the school's pool.

Shortly after, Juan Salvador suddenly dies. Devastated, Michell gives it a burial on St. George's campus under a tree near the rugby field. As he presents his eulogy to the staff and students, a beaten and shaken Sofia returns. Michell looks on as María and her granddaughter reunite.

== Cast ==
- Steve Coogan as Tom Michell
- Vivian El Jaber as María Alvarez
- Björn Gustafsson as Science Teacher Tapio
- David Herrero as Diego Camelia
- Jonathan Pryce as Headmaster Timothy Buckle
- Liam Mayne as Alejandro
- Alfonsina Carrocio as Sofía Alvarez
- Micaela Breque as Carina
- Aimar Miranda as Ernesto
- Nicanor Fernandez as Igor
- Hugo Fuertes as Ramiro
- Joaquín Lopez as Víctor
- Miguel Alejandro Serrano as Walter
- Brendan McNamee as Cooper

== Production ==
The film was shot in Spain in 2023 and in Argentina and Uruguay in 2024.

== Release ==
The Penguin Lessons premiered as a gala presentation at the 2024 Toronto International Film Festival.

It was released in the United States on 28 March 2025 by Sony Pictures Classics and in the United Kingdom and Ireland on 18 April 2025 by Lionsgate UK.

== Reception ==
=== Box office ===
As of 9 September 2026, the film made $14.2 million at the worldwide box office, including $3.3 million in the United States.

In its opening weekend in the United States, the film made $1.2 million from 1,017 cinemas. Losing 334 cinemas in its second weekend, the film fell 62% to $444,316.

=== Critical response ===
On the review aggregator website Rotten Tomatoes, 77% of 139 critics' reviews are positive, with an average rating of 6.4/10. The website's consensus reads: "The Penguin Lessons is appealing even if it curiously elides some disturbing geopolitical history, and is elevated by a winning performance from Steve Coogan with a little help from a lovable pint-sized companion." Metacritic, which uses a weighted average, assigned the film a score of 52 out of 100, based on 26 critics, indicating "mixed or average" reviews.
