= Betibú =

- Argentine theatrical release poster
- Directed by: Miguel Cohan
- Written by: Ana Cohan; Miguel Cohan
- Based on: Betibú by Claudia Piñeiro
- Produced by: Gerardo Herrero
- Starring: Mercedes Morán; Daniel Fanego; Alberto Ammann; José Coronado
- Cinematography: Rodrigo Pulpeiro
- Edited by: Irene Blecua
- Music by: Federico Jusid
- Production companies: Tornasol Filmes S.A. Telefe; Haddock Films
- Distributed by: Warner Bros. Pictures
- Release date: 3 April 2014
- Running time: 100 minutes
- Country: Argentina
- Language: Spanish

Betibú is a 2014 Argentine crime mystery film directed by Miguel Cohan and based on the novel of the same name by Claudia Piñeiro.

== Cast ==
- Mercedes Morán - Nurit Iscar
- Daniel Fanego - Jaime Brena
- Alberto Ammann - Mariano Saravia
- José Coronado - Lorenzo Rinaldi
- Osmar Núñez - Roberto Gandolfini
- Norman Briski - Gato
- Lito Cruz - Venturini
