= Kryptonita =

- Original theatrical release poster
- Directed by: Nicanor Loreti
- Written by: Nicanor Loreti; Camilo De Cabo; Nicolás Britos (collaboration); Paula Manzone (collaboration)
- Based on: The novel Kryptonita by Leonardo Oyola
- Produced by: Jimena Monteoliva; Nicanor Loreti
- Starring: Pablo Rago; Lautaro Delgado; Nicolás Vazquez; Diego Velázquez; Juan Palomino; Diego Capusotto
- Cinematography: Mariano Suárez
- Edited by: Nicanor Loreti; Francisco Freixá
- Music by: Darío Georges
- Production companies: Crudo Films; Hermanos Dawidson Films; Energía
- Distributed by: Energía (Argentina)
- Release date: 3 December 2015
- Running time: 80 minutes
- Country: Argentina
- Languages: Castilian Spanish; Guarani
- Box office: $7.600.000 ARS ($394.522 USD)

Kryptonita (transl. Kryptonite) is a 2015 Argentine action drama fantasy film co-written and directed by Nicanor Loreti and starring Pablo Rago, Lautaro Delgado, Juan Palomino and Diego Capusotto and based on the novel of the same name by Leonardo Oyola. The story uses Elseworlds' structure of alternative stories to adapt DC's Justice League superheroes to a suburban setting in Argentina, where Superman and his team are a gang with a low class background battling a corrupt police force and local versions of Doomsday and the Joker. It was officially released in the 2015 edition of the Mar del Plata International Film Festival.

After the success of the film, it was announced that the story would be adapted as a TV series sequel for the Argentine cable television channel Space. The series is titled Nafta Super and it premiered on November 16 of 2016. Nafta Super is a direct sequel to the film, picking up a few months after the story for Kryptonita ended, and with most of the original cast returning for a total of eight episodes.

== Synopsis ==
In an alternative world, Superman was raised in La Matanza ("The Slaughter" in Spanish), a working-class urban area near Buenos Aires, where he and the other members of the Justice League (Flash, Wonder Woman, Green Lantern, Hawkgirl, Batman and Martian Manhunter) have grown up to become antiheroes. Superman becomes known as "Nafta Super", and together with his friends they form the Nafta Super Gang, who rob banks and help the poor people in the city of La Matanza - a partido (county) located in the urban agglomeration of Greater Buenos Aires (Buenos Aires Province) - by giving them the stolen money.

Nafta Super and his gang (which includes a transvestite Wonder Woman) are enemies with another gang led by a bald gangster (Lex Luthor), and also fight corrupt members of the Buenos Aires Provincial Police (Bonaerense), who seek to stop their vigilante acts. Nafta Super is badly hurt by a piece of kryptonite and is taken to a hospital, where a doctor saves his life. Shortly after, the Bonaerense police appears seeking to capture or kill Super. They are assisted by Corona (the Joker), a scheming negotiator, and Turtle Head (Doomsday), a powerful member of GEOF Special Operations.

== Cast ==
- Juan Palomino as Nafta Super/El Pini/Pinino (Superman)
- Pablo Rago as El Federico (Batman)
- Lautaro Delgado as Lady Di (Wonder Woman)
- Diego Velázquez as Doctor González/"El Tordo"
- Nicolás Vázquez as Faisán (Green Lantern)
- Diego Capusotto as Corona (Joker)
- Diego Cremonesi as Ráfaga (Flash)
- Sofía Palomino as Cuñatai Güirá (Hawkgirl)
- Carca as Juan Raro (Martian Manhunter)
- Pablo Pinto as Turtle Head/Oficial Cabeza de Tortuga (Doomsday)
- Sebastián De Caro as Lieutenant Ranni/Teniente Ranni (James Gordon)
- Gabriel Schultz as Police Officer/Oficial Olfa (Harvey Bullock)
- Susana Varela as Nurse Nilda/Enfermera Nilda
- Luis Ziembrowski as Detective Ventura
