= Escape Perfecto =

Argentine game show

Escape perfecto is an Argentine TV game show..

== Awards ==
=== Nominations ===
- 2015 Martín Fierro Awards: Best entertainment program.
