= Científicos Industria Argentina =

Argentine television program

Científicos Industria Argentina is an Argentine television program. It describes the news about science and technology in Argentina.

== Awards ==
- 2014 Martín Fierro Awards: Best cultural program.
