= The Queen of Fear =

2018 film

- Theatrical release poster
- Directed by: Valeria Bertuccelli; Fabiana Tiscornia
- Written by: Valeria Bertuccelli
- Starring: Valeria Bertuccelli; Diego Velázquez; Gabriel Goity; Darío Grandinetti; Mercedes Scápola
- Music by: Vicentico
- Release dates: 21 January 2018 (Sundance); 22 March 2018 (Argentina)
- Running time: 107 minutes
- Country: Argentina
- Language: Spanish

The Queen of Fear (Spanish: La reina del miedo) is a 2018 Argentine drama film written and codirected by Valeria Bertuccelli, in her directorial debut. It was screened in the World Cinema Dramatic Competition section at the 2018 Sundance Film Festival.

== Cast ==
- Valeria Bertuccelli as Robertina
- Diego Velázquez as Lisandro
- Gabriel Goity as Alberto
- Darío Grandinetti as Robertina's husband
- Mercedes Scápola as Depiladora
