= Anita (2009 film) =

Anita, la vida puede cambiar en un instante (Anita, life can change in an instant)
- Directed by: Marcos Carnevale
- Produced by: Marco Carnevale; Jorge Gundín
- Starring: Norma Aleandro; Luis Luque; Leonor Manso; Peto Menahem; Alejandra Manzo; Marcela Guerty; Mercedes Scápola; Mateo Cho; Mei Lan Chen; Huang Hui Shion
- Cinematography: Guillermo Zappino
- Edited by: Pablo Barbieri Carrera
- Music by: Lito Vitale
- Release date: 2009
- Running time: 104 minutes
- Country: Argentina
- Language: Spanish

Anita is an Argentine drama film released in 2009.

== Synopsis ==
Anita (Alejandra Manzo) is a young girl with Down syndrome and lives with her mother (Norma Aleandro) in the Once neighborhood of Balvanera in Buenos Aires. Her life is changed forever in 1994 after the AMIA bombing. Anita doesn't understand what has happened; she only remembers that her mother left to handle some paperwork, the ground began to shake and she fell off the ladder she was not supposed to climb. Frightened by the noise, she runs from the area of the bombing, totally disoriented. In her odyssey she encounters several people that provide temporary assistance as she searches for her mother.

== The People Anita Encounters ==
=== Felix ===
Foul-mouthed, constant problems with his ex-wife and unkempt, he takes her in after encountering her at a public phone, feeding her and giving her a bed. He lets her stay for one night and then kicks her out along with a warm sweater to wear. Another time, he leaves her on the bus to fend for herself. He always thinks of the possibility of going to the police with her.

=== Chinese family ===
Anita gets hungry and she chooses a store with a severe owner and her docile mother. She is rejected when she has no money and rudely served when she does have money. The mother convinced her daughter to let Anita into their family life, where she eats and asks for more. She quietly witnesses the family arguments. On the last day she is with them, the son sees her dancing to music while he is in charge of the store and he turns it up and dances with her. This leads to a store robbery, Anita being threatened, as well. She manages to get out and runs away.

=== Shady Men/Nurse ===
Anita falls asleep with a fever on a sofa which men have to move for an unknown reason and she is taken to one of the men's sister, Nori, a nurse, who injects Anita with a cure for fever. She tells her brother to eventually do something about Anita because she works and cannot take care of her. When she allows Anita to stay alone, Anita misinterprets her instructions and stays on the couch no matter what, which includes bodily functions. Anita ruins her couch with urine. Nori was stressed out and became furious at Anita. But one day Nori got fired at work, when she returned home depressed she injured herself, Anita was the one who took care of her and comforted her. She then changed her view on Anita and decided to keep her.

== Cast ==
- Alejandra Manzo - Anita.
- Norma Aleandro - Dora (Anita's mother).
- Luis Luque - Félix.
- Leonor Manso - Nori (a nurse).
- Peto Menahem - Ariel (Anita's brother).
- Mercedes Scápola - Nati (Ariel's girlfriend).
- Marcela Guerty - Claudia (Félix's wife).
- Mei Lan Chen
- Huang Hui Shion
- Mateo Cho
- Agus Weimer
- Sofi Spengler
- Meli Fuchs
- Jesi Fuchs
- Carla Ramos
- Marti Alva

== Critical reception ==
Anita has received mostly positives reviews by critics and has been known for being true to reality. The most notable critic was that of Carla González C., who said: "It is an excellently-made Argentine movie. The simplicity of its filming and the depth of its content give the viewer the opportunity to reflect on various issues. Some of them are inclusion and our ability to adapt to adversities".

== Awards ==
=== Argentine Academy of Cinematography Arts and Sciences Awards ===
- Best Supporting Actress for Leonor Manso (Won)
- Best Supporting Actress for Norma Aleandro (Nominated)
- Best New Actress for Alejandra Manzo (Nominated)
- Best Original Screenplay for Marcos Carnevale and Marcela Guerty (Nominated)

=== Silver Condor Award ===
- Best Supporting Actress for Norma Aleandro (Nominated)
- Best Newcomer for Alejandra Manzo (Nominated)
