= Adela Montes =

Argentine journalist (1928–2024)

Adela Montes (6 September 1928 – 4 April 2024) was an Argentine entertainment journalist, whose career spanned from 1949 until her final days. She is considered one of Argentina's entertainment journalism pioneers.

Montes is also recognized for inspiring the word cholula, a popular Rioplatense Spanish slang term for a celebrity-obsessed person.

== Biography ==
Adela Montes was born to Spanish immigrant parents in Buenos Aires in 1928. Her family struggled financially, forcing her to leave school to work in a factory at age 12. She later became certified to work as a nurse. At that point, she had already developed an interest in film and theater, and she would frequently stand by the stagedoors to ask stars for their autographs. In 1946, she formed a group of fans called Club de Cazadores de Autógrafos (the Autograph Hunters Club), who went around Buenos Aires in search of stars' signatures or photographs.

Her group attracted the attention of various publications, such as Radiolandia. An article in that publication allowed Montes to obtain her first assignments as an entertainment columnist, eventually leading her to host entertainment programs on Radio Libertad and Radio Mitre. She was then given her own program on Canal TV from 1958 to 1973, though she generally preferred not to appear on television.

In 1959, she became a founding member of the Asociación de Periodistas de la Televisión y Radiofonía Argentina. She later was hired to oversee the entertainment section of the magazine Gente, eventually shifting the magazine from its political focus toward more entertainment coverage.

Montes' influence in the entertainment world, as well as her constant search for celebrities to ask for an autograph, inspired a caricaturist, Toño Gallo, to create a comic strip based on her in the late 1950s: "Cholula, loca por los astros" ("Cholula, Crazy for the Stars"). From then on, the word cholulo or cholula came into popular use in Argentina to describe someone who constantly seeks to meet celebrities.

Despite her age and various health problems, she continued to write columns in gossip magazines such as Pronto until her final days. She died in Buenos Aires on 4 April 2024, at the age of 95.
