= Viento sur =

Viento sur is a 2014 Argentine miniseries.

== Awards ==
=== Nominations ===
- 2014 Martín Fierro Awards
  - Best miniseries
  - Best lead actress of Miniseries (Maite Zumelzu)
