= Olympia (2011 film) =

- Film poster
- Directed by: Leo Damario
- Written by: Karina Noriega; Leo Damario
- Starring: Mora Escolá; Mercedes Morán; Edda Bustamante; María Nela Sinisterra; Victoria Bugallo
- Cinematography: Daniel Arreaza; Leo Damario; Phillipp Otte
- Edited by: Ezequiel Yoffe
- Music by: Ale Sergi
- Distributed by: KAFilms
- Release dates: May 2011 (Festival de Cine Inusual); 12 February 2012
- Running time: 78 minutes
- Country: Argentina
- Language: Spanish

Olympia is a 2011 Argentine indie film directed by Leo Damario and starring Mora Escolá, Mercedes Morán, Edda Bustamante, María Nela Sinisterra and Victoria Bugallo.

The film narrates the story of an 18-year-old aspiring porn star and influencer, Olympia (Escolá), who, after starring in a couple of amateur videos, enters the professional industry in her first major title, which involves a scene with 16 other men. Different personalities from the rock, fashion and porn universe are to accompany the starlet to become a renowned pop culture icon.

The film premiered in the 62nd Berlin International Film Festival in the European Film Market.

== Cast ==
- Mora Escolá as Virginia/Olympia
- Victoria Bugallo as Micaela, Virginia's friend and first roommate
- Karina Noriega as Sol, Virginia's sister
- Mercedes Morán as the porn director
- Victoria Spinsanti as Perla, a fellow porn-star, Virginia's lover and second roommate
- Edda Bustamante as Lebon
- María Nela Sinisterra as Vernita, a professional porn star
