= El diario de Mariana =

El diario de Mariana (Spanish: Mariana's magazine And Also Known As Stylelized DDM Since 2015) is an Argentine talk show, hosted by Mariana Fabbiani. It was aired by El Trece. It was released to be premiere On May 20, 2013 to concluded On December 30, 2019. A four years later it was survived aired by América TV which was premiered On July 17, 2023. It is currently rated as 3.5 on the IMDB .
