= Leonor Manso =

Argentine actress (born 1948)

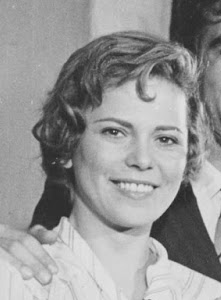
- Born: Leonor Dionisia Manso; 16 April 1948 (age 78); Buenos Aires, Argentina
- Occupation: Actress
- Years active: 1969-present

Leonor Manso (born 16 April 1948) is an Argentine actress. She appeared in more than 70 films since 1969. Manso directed her first production, Waiting for Godot, in 1996. She married and divorced fellow actors Antonio Grimau and Patricio Contreras.

== Selected filmography ==
Film
Year	Title	Role	Notes
1970	El Santo de la Espada		
1971	Argentino hasta la muerte		
1973	The Seven Madmen	La bizca	
1974	Boquitas pintadas		
1975	La Hora de María y el pájaro de oro		
1985	The Rigorous Fate		
1987	Made in Argentina		
1998	The Cloud		
2009	Los condenados (The Damned)	Andrea	
2009	Anita		
2015	Francis: Pray for Me		
2016	Los ricos no piden permiso		

Television
Year	Title	Role	Notes
2004	Locas de amor		
2009	Tratame bien		
2011	El elegido		
2013	Farsantes		
2017	Cuéntame cómo pasó	Herminia Torres	
