= Enseñame a vivir =

- Genre: Telenovela; Comedy; Drama
- Created by: Adrián Suar
- Directed by: Jorge Nisco
- Starring: Pablo Rago; Violeta Urtizberea; Jorge Suárez; Patricia Etchegoyen; Laura Azcurra; Felipe Colombo; Julieta Zylberberg; Germán Kraus; Pepe Monje; Ana María Picchio
- Opening theme: Enseñame a vivir by Fernando Dente and Carolina de la Muela
- Country of origin: Argentina
- Original language: Spanish
- No. of episodes: 136

Production
- Executive producer: Rodolfo Antúñez
- Production location: Argentina
- Running time: 60 minutes
- Production company: Pol-ka

Original release
- Network: El Trece
- Release: 12 May – 14 December 2009

Related
- Atracción x4; Consentidos

Enseñame a vivir (Teach me to live) is an Argentine telenovela produced by Pol-ka and broadcast by El Trece from May 12 to December 14, 2009.

== Cast ==
- Pablo Rago as Lucas Antonio Linares
- Violeta Urtizberea as Asaí/Clodine Fernández Salguero
- Jorge Suárez as Félix Argentino Benítez
- Laura Azcurra as Marcela Correale
- Felipe Colombo as Cristobal Amadeo Linares
- Agustina Lecouna as Maria Luján Fernández Salguero
- Julieta Zylberberg as Clodine Fernández Salguero/Lorena Beatriz Benítez
- Adela Gleijer as Amanda Fernández Salguero
- Patricia Etchegoyen as Emilia Benítez
- Jorge Maggio as Ignacio "Nacho" Miguens
- Germán Kraus as Manuel Goyena
- Pepe Monje as Angel Farsa
- Ana María Picchio as Pomona
- Laura Cymer as Ro
- Daniela Aita as Chipsy
- Fernando Dente as Miguel Angel "Macu"

== Plot ==
On a flight back to Buenos Aires, the millionaire Fernández Salguero family, their young daughter, Clodine, and servants, are stranded in the jungle after their jet malfunctions. The only survivors are Clodine and servants (the Benítez family), one of whom has a daughter of similar age (Lorena). They decide to abandon Clodine in the wild and tell their own young daughter to take the identity of Clodine in order to get her inheritance. They manage to convince her grandmother, Amanda Fernández Salguero, that Lorena is actually her granddaughter.

20 years later, the news reports the findings of "a young girl of the jungle" who was raised by monkeys. Responding to the name "Asai", she appears to have survived in the wild for the last 20 years. Amanda, stirred by the memory of the tragic loss of her son and daughter-in-law, invites "Asai" to live with her, and the secret of the Benítez family is threatened by her appearance.

== Awards and nominations ==
Year	Award	Category	Nominated work	Result
2009	Prêmio Clarín	Revelation of the Year	Julieta Zylberberg	Won
2009	Prêmio Martín Fierro	Best Actress	Violeta Urtizberea	Nominated
2009	Prêmio Martín Fierro	Best Actor	Pablo Rago	Nominated
2009	Prêmio Martín Fierro	Best Supporting Actress	Ana María Picchio	Nominated
2009	Prêmio Martín Fierro	Best Supporting Actress	Patricia Etchegoyen	Won
