= Todo por dos pesos =

Argentine television program

Todo por dos pesos (written Todo x 2 $) was an Argentine comedy television show. It was hosted by Fabio Alberti and Diego Capusotto, and scripted by Alberti, Capusotto, Pedro Saborido, and Néstor Montalbano. During the show, the hosts used the pseudonyms of Mario and Marcelo, possibly referring to two Argentine television hosts and long-term rivals, Mario Pergolini and Marcelo Tinelli. The name of the show parodied retailers of low-cost, kitschy, imported objects mainly from China.

== Origins ==
Alfredo Casero's shows, De la cabeza and Cha Cha Cha, served as antecedents, in which Alberti and Capusotto participated over several seasons. The show attempted absurdist humor. Another antecedent was Delicatessen, broadcast by América TV. It included Capusotto and Alberti along with Horacio Fontova and Damián Dreizik.

== Format ==
Sketches were presented "live" from the studio (located in Miami) by the two hosts, who were accompanied by a Chinese secretary (Irene Chong-Lin, born in Hong Kong) nicknamed Sushi Tepanaki, an older man (Alfonso Crispino), who under the pseudonym of Dr. Dyango appeared while dancing ridiculously, a dancing trio called "Los Carlitos Bala", and audience members. As of 2000 the section known as "The musical ranking of Todo por dos pesos" took shape. Throughout that year, 58 songs enriched the program, with artists such as Los 3 locos, which had the highest ranking of that year. The topic with the least turnover was Copetín de Buenos Aires by Jaime Cohen.

== Reception ==
The program started on Azul TV in 1999, without much success, and was canceled. Marcelo Stiletano, of the newspaper La Nación described it as a "ferocious vision of cheap TV", in which "disorder, scarcity and improvisation" hide a meticulous work of production with parody objectives. The following year it moved to Channel 7 until its completion in 2002. This freed the show from "the pressure of the rating". Paradoxically, from that season onwards, the program obtained a remarkable success, becoming established as the highest rated offering of the channel in years. In 2001, its success was threatened because Tinelli dedicated that year to satirizing President Fernando de la Rúa in his comic program El Show de Videomatch. During the year's last installment Canal 7 announced that a commemorative plaque would be placed on the door of the studio where the Program was recorded.

== Sketches and characters ==
- The Bobo Man (Capusotto): Parody of the Werewolf. «When the Moon comes out, an ordinary man is transformed into the Bobo Man, terrorizing all Humanity with his mischief.»
- The Musical Ranking: Recreated video clips were shown, changing the lyrics and images of classic national and foreign themes.
- Total Boluda: A parody of cable programs dedicated to women, led by a clumsy Coty Nosiglia (Fabio Alberti, also the name of an Argentine politician).
- Irma Jusid (Capusotto): A woman who gave advice to young people and warned of the dangers of certain situations with exaggerated examples of the reprimands they would suffer.
- HP: A parody of a soap opera called PH (Horizontal Property). In it, the characters become involved in dramatic situations, and the predominant phrase in their dialogues is the repeatedly bleeped out "son of a bitch!".
- El Rinconcito del Consumidor: A program conducted by Dr. Dyango (Alfonso Grispino) disguised as a woman, in which he recommended to save second-hand items with notorious flaws, parodying programs for housewives, especially 33 million consumers, led by Lita de Lázzari.
- What Happens to the Argentines ?: The program ended with demented monologue about the entertainment world and the country, where Alberti drew incoherent lines on a blackboard to illustrate the situation he described. Alberti reused this resource years later when he led Hard to Lunch.
- Beto Tony and his Doll: Alberti played a ventriloquist who told lousy jokes like "first act, second act ...". At the end of each joke, after a second of sepulchral silence, someone shouted: "It's okay!" And the audience burst into applause.
- Flavio Pedemonti: Alfonso Grispino played an ex-footballer who had gone through all kinds of excesses and difficult situations, preparing to return to the sport.
- Tito Cossa: Parody of the detective series, with Germán Navetta in the leading role of Tito Cossa (name taken from that of a well-known Argentine dramatist). The character emulated a secret spy of the SIDE displaying parodic situations by contrast: for example, weapons made with strips of chorizos or cañoncitos of dulce de leche, or a carriage -including horse- made with the elements of a kitchen (oven), fireplace, hot water tank, etc.).
- The Column of Galloso (2000-2001): Parody of a television newscast, in which the iconic broadcaster Horacio Galloso (1933-2012) presented his "journalistic column", showing smiling cases of Buenos Aires reality.
- That Friend of the Asma (2001): Parody of the musical nocturnal program That friend of the soul, of Lito Vitale.
- Good News (2002): A parody of the official newscast, in which a kind of mini-president Duhalde presented "Argentine solutions" for the problems created by the lack of certain products that had vanished after the devaluation.
- Guálter and his Organ: Inspired by the true "Walter and his Organ"; an Argentine musician who played the electric organ. Guálter made music with his sexual organ. Like Walter, he encouraged birthdays and weddings.
- Vinazzi: A man who sang melodies bubbling in a wine glass.

== Seasons ==
- All for two pesos (Azul Television, May 12, 1999 - August 25, 1999)
- All for two pesos (Channel 7, May 2, 2000 - December 19, 2000)
- All for two pesos (Channel 7, April 9, 2001 - December 17, 2001)
- All for two pesos: That is what God wants (Channel 7, May 21, 2002 November 15–26, 2002)

In 2006, Channel 9 replaced three compilations of the 1999 season in the framework of the 10th anniversary of the producer Ideas del Sur. At the end of 2008 and the beginning of 2009, Channel 7 replaced the 2000 season as part of a series of reruns of comedy programs broadcast by that channel.

== Featured presentations ==
- Ricardo Mollo & Vinazzi: «Bombay Shrimp» (2000)
- Los Pericos & Vinazzi: "Nothing to lose" (2000)
- Antonio Ríos: «Lie to him» (2000)
- Illya Kuryaki and the Valderramas & Vinazzi: «Jennifer del Estero» (2000)
- Pedro Aznar & Vinazzi: "At first sight" (2000)
- The Symbol: «Sing» (2000)
- Gustavo Cerati & The Three Stooges: «Call Moe» (parody of «Of light music») (2000)
- The Pericos: «Nothing to lose» (2000)
- Babasónicos & Vinazzi: "The madman" (2001)
- Babasónicos: «Deléctrico» (2001)
- Los Piojos & Vinazzi: «So lonely» (2001)
- Las Pelotas: «Captain America» (2001)
- La Renga & Vinazzi: «2 + 2 = 3» (2001)
- La Renga: «Panic Show» (2001)
- Catupecu Machu & Vinazzi: "Whole or pieces" (2001)
- Attaque 77: "Give me fire" (2001)
- Víctor Heredia: "Run without canvases" (parody of "Surviving")
- Virus & Vinazzi: «Wadu wadu»
- The Knights of the Burning & Vinazzi: «Avanti morocha»
- Natalia Oreiro: «Change the Mattress» and «Your Sailboat» (2000)

== Martín Fierro Awards ==
- 2000: Best Humor Program
- 2000: Best Humorous Work (Diego Capusotto)
- 2001: Best Humorous Work (Fabio Alberti)
