= Ingrid Pelicori =

Argentine actress

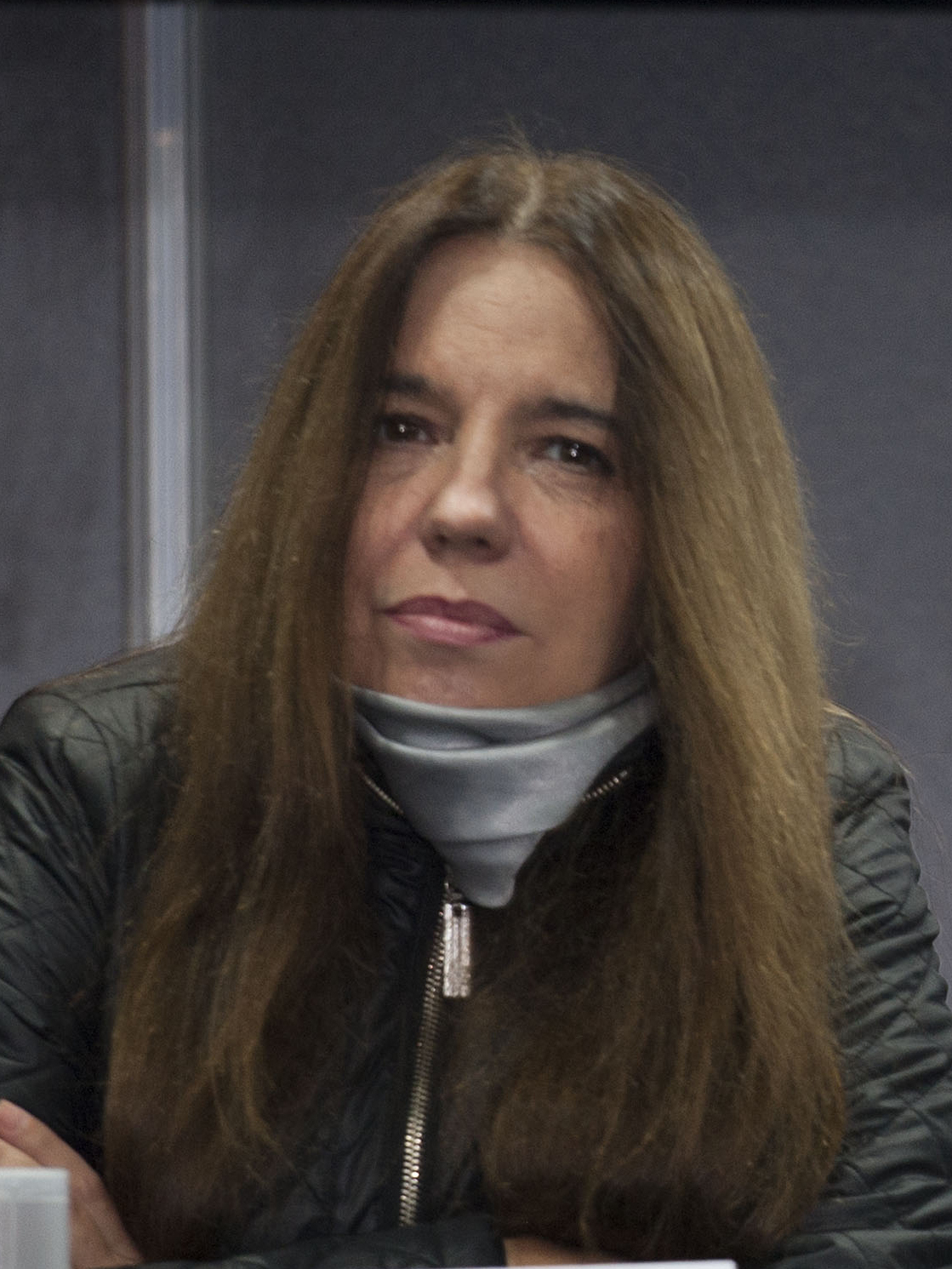
- Born: 13 January 1957 (age 69); Buenos Aires, Argentina
- Occupation: Actress
- Years active: 1979–present

Ingrid Pelicori (born 13 January 1957) is an Argentine actress. She is best known for playing Ana Graziani in the El Trece telenovela Farsantes.

== Awards ==
=== Nominations ===
- 2007 Martín Fierro Awards
  - Best Supporting Actress, on El Rafa
- 2014 Martín Fierro Awards
  - Best Actress in a Movie or Miniseries, on Historias de corazón
