= Myrna Mores =

Argentine actress and singer

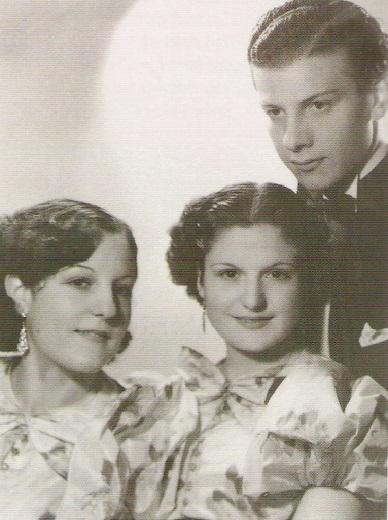

Background information
- Birth name: Guillermina Morangues
- Born: 3 October 1920; Córdoba
- Died: 14 March 2014 (aged 93); Buenos Aires

Guillermina Moragues (3 October 1920 – 14 March 2014), better known as Myrna Mores, was an Argentine actress and singer.

== Biography ==
Born in Córdoba, she was encouraged by her parents to sing from a young age. She began her career as a member of the duo Hermanas Mores, together with her sister Margot Mores, with whom she studied at the PAADI Musical Academy. In 1937, both appeared on the radio La voz del aire. In 1938 he joined the Trío Mores, together with Margot and Mariano Mores, whose name was Mariano Martínez and who adopted the artistic name of the sisters. That same year the trio recorded the tangos of Masao Koga. His voice was considered expressive, warm and with good vocal control.

In 1939 she acted in two films by Enrique de Rosas and Isidoro Navarro. In 1940 the trio dissolved. She continued her career as a singer and in 1941. She performed on stage in the play La historia del tango. In 1943, she married Mariano Mores. At the end of the 1960s, she acted in the successful television series La familia Mores.

Her discography is scarce, but there is the song "Tan solo tú", with Francisco Canaro, "Tormenta en el Alma", with Ernesto Famá and "Apasionadamente". In 2006 she performed at the Teatro Opera interpreting Cuartito Azul, the theme that Mariano Mores dedicated to her.

She died in Buenos Aires on 14 March 2014 at the age of ninety-three. She is interred in the family pantheon of the Olivos cemetery.

== Filmography ==
- Mandinga en la sierra (1939)
- Frente a la vida (1939)
- El sobretodo de Céspedes (1939)
