= Peter Capusotto y sus videos =

- Genre: Television comedy, sketch comedy, black comedy
- Created by: Diego Capusotto; Pedro Saborido
- Directed by: Miguel Colom; Pablo Ambrosini
- Starring: Diego Capusotto; Pedro Saborido; Ivana Acosta; Javier Aón; Jacqueline Decibe; Federico De La Iglesia; Federico López; Marcelo Lamorte; Alejandro Lombrosqui
- Opening theme: "Sympathy for the Devil" performed by Capusotto
- Composer: Jagger/Richards
- Country of origin: Argentina
- Original language: Spanish
- No. of seasons: 10

Production
- Running time: 55–60 min (ATC); 30 min (Rock&Pop TV)

Original release
- Network: Rock&Pop TV (2006); TV Pública (2007–ongoing); TBS (2012–ongoing)
- Release: October 17, 2006

Peter Capusotto y sus videos (Peter Capusotto and his videos) is an Argentine comedy TV program, created by Diego Capusotto and Pedro Saborido, hosted by Capusotto. The show's name is a combination of both members' names: Peter (Pedro in English) and (Diego's surname) Capusotto.

== History ==
=== Season 1 (2006) ===
The Peter Capusotto y sus videos began in October 2006 when Diego Capusotto, a comedian from Todo Por 2 Pesos show, together with the writer Pedro Saborido produced a local TV sketch-comedy show in Rock&Pop TV channel, but it was later canceled because of the low audience.

=== Season 2–3 (2007) ===
In early 2007, Capusotto and Saborido sold the show to the ATC channel. Production of the first season took place in Villa Luro, during the summer and the fall of 2007. The seasons 2 and 3 of Peter Capusotto was premiered in 2007, by the Martín Fierro Awards. It was an instant hit for ATC, and the show was picked up for a second season immediately, soon becoming the highest-rated TV series of the TV Pública.

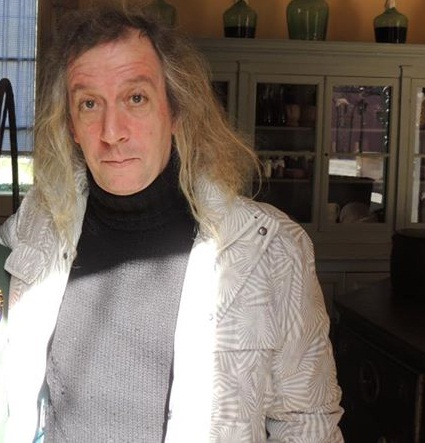
Diego Capusotto in 2012.

=== Season 4 (2008) ===
The fourth season of Peter Capusotto y sus videos began in 2008. It was the most successful one due to the appearance of classic characters from the show: Micky Vainilla (a racist and wealthy singer who is continually accused by the press of promoting discrimination in his music), Mensaje del Ministerio de Educación (directed by Juan Estrasnoy, an education minister who tries to teach to two people of low and high class, language correct methods with violently ways), Almas sensibles - La vida de un emo, Quiste Sebáceo (parody of Alice Cooper and Marilyn Manson), Nicolino Roche y los Pasteros Verdes (parody of the rock band Soda Stereo and the Argentine boxer Nicolino Locche, a group of new wave music that stands out for its incomprehensible language and its addiction to the analgesic pills), Bob Nervio (parody of Bob Dylan), Una que Sepamos Más o Menos, El Loco Daisy May Queen, Bombita Rodríguez (a pop music singer of the seventies that makes continual references to Peronism of those years), Beverly Di Tomasso.

=== Season 6 (2010) ===
It began on July 19, 2010, and lasted for ten programs to September 20, 2010. This season included new segments, including Jesús de Laferrere, American Psychobolche, Dúo Soplanacu and Consumo, among other sketches.

=== Season 7 (2012) ===
This season included various other segments like Jorge Meconio.

== Peter Capusotto y sus 3 Dimensiones ==
In 2011, Capusotto and Saborido with the production from Pablo Bossi, Daniel Morano and Juan Pablo Buscarini, began the first film based on the television series. The film was directed by Pedro Saborido, and stars the regular television cast of the same show. INCAA, Pampa Films and Triple D productions financed the movie and was released on January 26, 2012. The film was a box office success in Argentina.

== Awards ==
- 2007 Martín Fierro Awards - Best humoristic program
- 2008 Martín Fierro Awards - Best humoristic program, Best Comedy Actor, Best Music
- 2009 Martín Fierro Awards - Best humoristic program
- 2010 Martín Fierro Awards - Best humoristic program
- 2011 Martín Fierro Awards - Best humoristic program
- 2012 Martín Fierro Awards - Best humoristic program

=== Nominations ===
- 2013 Martín Fierro Awards
  - Best humoristic program
