= Mercedes Morán =

Argentine film and television actress (born 1955)

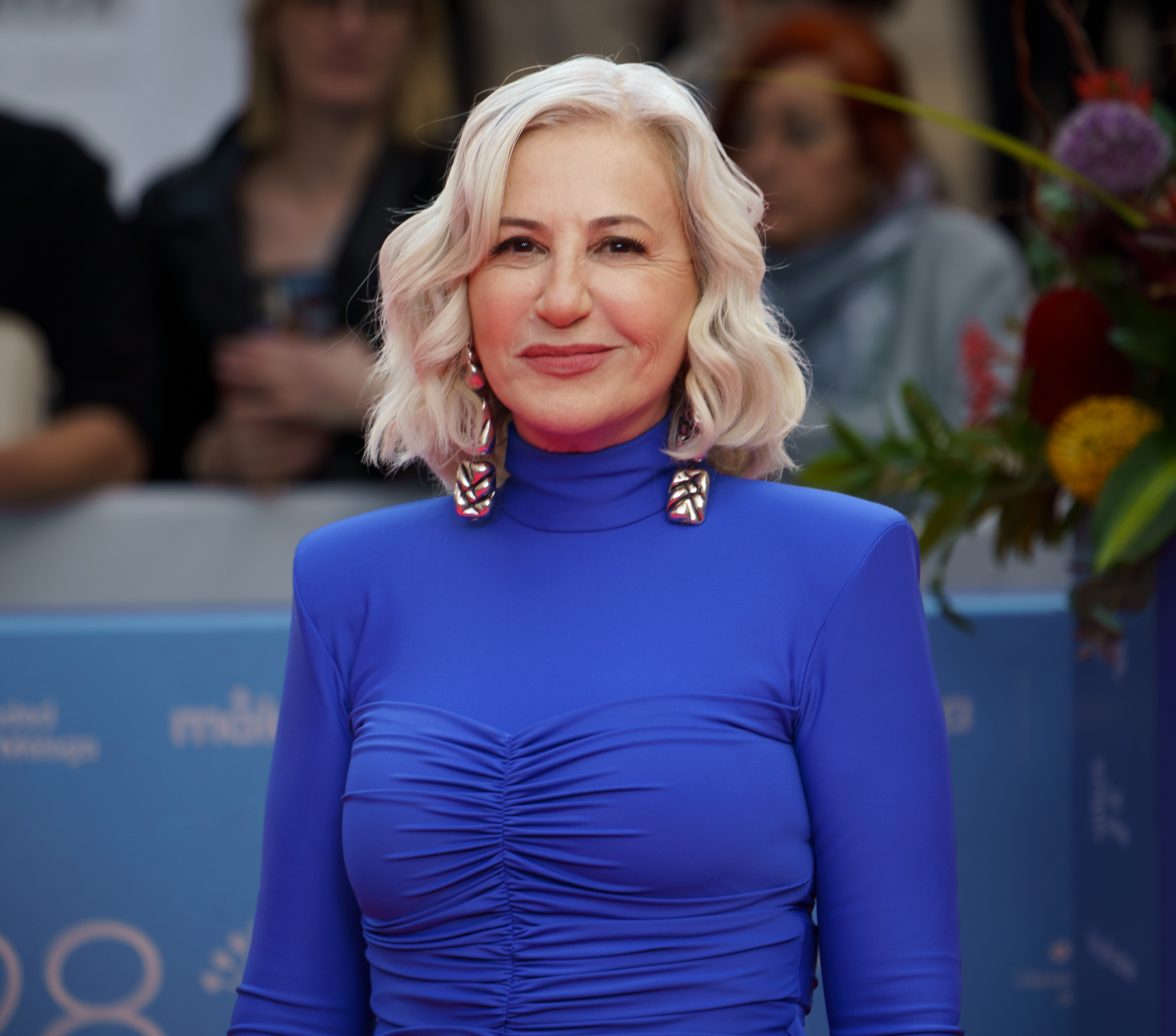
- Morán in 2025
- Born: Mercedes Beatriz Morán; 1955 (age 70–71); Concarán, San Luis, Argentina
- Occupation: Actress
- Years active: 1980–present
- Spouse: Oscar Martínez (m. 1987; div. 2000)
- Partner: Fidel Sclavo (2006–2018)
- Children: 3, including Mercedes Scápola

Mercedes Beatriz Morán (Latin American Spanish: [meɾˈseðes moˈɾan]; born 1955) is an Argentine actress, known for her role in the television miniseries Culpables.

== Early life and career ==
Morán was born in Concarán, San Luis Province in 1955. Her mother was an "ultra-Catholic" rural teacher. She took three years of a degree in sociology, but dropped out during the last civil-military dictatorship, joining an acting workshop along with Lito Cruz.

Morán has worked in several TV programs, such as Donde pueda quererte, Rosa de lejos, Por siempre amigos, Gasoleros, Culpables, Tiempo final, Mujeres asesinas, Amas de casa desesperadas, El hombre de tu vida, En terapia and La celebración. She worked on stage in plays such as El efecto de los rayos gamma, Locos de contentos, Humores que matan, Monólogos de la vagina, Pequeños crímenes conyugales, Agosto, Buena gente and La brisa de la vida. She worked in films such as Mirha de Liniers a Estambul, El Sur, La Ciénaga, Whisky Romeo Zulu, Luna de Avellaneda, The Motorcycle Diaries, Cordero de Dios, La ronda, Los Marziano and Betibú.

She was the lead actress of Culpables in 2001, which was awarded the Golden Martín Fierro Award. That year she was nominated as the best lead actress in miniseries, but did not receive the award. She had a cameo appearance in Graduados in 2012, which starred her daughter Mercedes Scápola. She played the mother of Scápola's character, the housekeeper "Clarita". Both of them work as regular actresses in the 2014 telenovela Guapas. She also had a scene with the actor Juan Leyrado, with subtle references to the 1998 telenovela Gasoleros. Both of them were the lead actors in it.

== Personal life ==
She married at 17 and with the disapproval of her parents. Mercedes Morán has three daughters. Mercedes Scápola and María Scápola from her first marriage with Oscar Scápola. Manuela has a daughter with fellow actor Oscar Martínez with whom she had a long relationship and she divorced in 2000.

== Filmography ==
=== Television ===
Year	Title	Character	Channel	Notes
1980	Donde pueda quererte		Canal 11	
1980-1981	Rosa... de lejos	Paola Carbó Alvear	TV Pública	
1987	Por siempre amigos	Andrea	Telefe	
1990	Atreverse	Mercedes	Telefe	
1994	La marca del deseo		Telefe	
1996	De poeta y de loco	Luciana	Canal 13	
1997	Señoras y señores	Carla	TV Pública	
1998-1999	Gasoleros	Roxana "Roxi" Pressuti	Canal 13	
2001	Culpables	Chechu	Canal 13	
2002	Tiempo final	Raquel	Telefe	Episode: "Los ladrones"
2002	Infieles	Paula	Telefe	Episode: "El día del aniversario"
2005	Conflictos en red	Silvia Massey	Telefe	Episode: "Loop"
2005	Mujeres asesinas	Graciela Hammer	Canal 13	Episode: "Graciela, incendiaria"
2006	Amas de casa desesperadas	Lía Salgari	Canal 13	
2008	Socias	Inés Asturias	Canal 13	
2011-2012	El hombre de tu vida	Gloria Pinotti	Telefe	
2012	Graduados	Dolores "Dolly" López	Telefe	
2012	Amores de historia	Clelia Luro	Canal 9	Episode: "Clelia y Jerónimo"
2013	En terapia	Andrea Mendel	TV Pública	
2014	La celebración	Lola	Telefe	Episode: "Aniversario"
2014-2015	Guapas	Mónica Duarte	Canal 13	
2015	La casa	Paula/Verónica Clausen	TV Pública	
2021	Maradona: Blessed Dream	Dalma Salvadora "Doña Tota" Franco	Amazon Prime Video	
2021	El reino	Elena Vázquez Pena	Netflix	
2022	Yosi, the Regretful Spy	Mónica Raposo	Amazon Prime Video	
2026	My Sad Dead	Ema	Netflix	4 episodes

=== Theater ===
Year	Title	Director	Theater
1983-1984	El efecto de los rayos gamma	Carlos Rivas	
1985-1986	Una Margarita llamada Mercedes	Omar Grasso	
1987-1988	El último de los amantes ardientes	Luis Agustoni	
1989-1990	El protagonista ante el espejo		
1991	Locos de contentos	Carlos Rivas	
1992	Jake's Women	Alberto Ure	
1994	Ángeles perdidos	Carlos Rivas	
1995	Cristales rotos	Carlos Rivas	
1997	Humores que matan	Oscar Martínez	
2001	Monólogos de la vagina	Lía Jelín	
2004-2005	Pequeños crímenes conyugales	Rubén Szuchmacher	Paseo La Plaza
2009	Agosto: Condado de Osage	Claudio Tolcachir	Teatro Lola Membrives
2010	Amor, dolor y qué me pongo	Mercedes Morán	Teatro Tabarís
2012	Buena Gente	Claudio Tolcachir	Teatro Liceo
2012	La brisa de la vida	Jorge Azurmendi	Casa del Teatro Regina
2016	¡Ay, amor divino!	Claudio Tolcachir	Teatro Maipo

=== Movies ===
Year	Movie	Character	Director
1987	Mirta, de Liniers a Estambul		Jorge Coscia and Guillermo Saura
1989	Nunca estuve en Viena	Eugenia	Antonio Larreta
1995	De amor y de sombra	María Elena	Betty Kaplan
2001	La Ciénaga	Tali	Lucrecia Martel
2004	Whisky Romeo Zulu	Marcela	Enrique Piñeyro
2004	The Holy Girl	Helena	Lucrecia Martel
2004	Moon of Avellaneda	Graciela Fernández	Juan José Campanella
2004	The Motorcycle Diaries	Celia de la Serna	Walter Salles
2004	Próxima salida	Susana de Velmar	Nicolás Tuozzo
2006	Remake	Carol	Roger Gual
2006	Cara de queso -mi primer ghetto-	Lilí	Ariel Winograd
2008	La ronda	Mónica	Inés Braun
2008	Lamb of God	Teresa	Lucía Cedrón
2008	Un novio para mi mujer	Blanca's voice	Juan Taratuto
2011	Los Marziano	Nena	Ana Katz
2011	Olympia	The Director	Leo Damario
2014	Betibú	Nurit Iscar/Betibú	Miguel Cohan
2015	Chiamatemi Francesco	Esther Ballestrino	Daniele Luchetti
2016	Artax: Un nuevo Comienzo	Mariana	Diego Corsini
2016	Neruda	Delia del Carril	Pablo Larraín
2017	Maracaibo	Cristina	Miguel Ángel Rocca
2018	El Angel	Ana María Peralta	Luis Ortega
2018	Sueño Florianópolis	Lucrecia	Ana Katz
2018	El amor menos pensado	Ana	Juan Vera
2018	La familia sumergida	Marcela	María Alché
2019	Spider	Inés	Andrés Wood
2020	Reina salvaje	Carlota	Martín Lucchesi
2023	Empieza el baile	Margarita	Marina Seresesky
2023	Elena sabe	Elena	Anahí Berneri

== Awards and nominations ==
- Argentine Film Critics Association Awards: Silver Condor; Best Supporting Actress, for La Ciénaga; 2002 (nom).
- Argentine Film Critics Association Awards: Silver Condor; Best Actress, for Luna de Avellaneda; 2005 (nom).
- Argentine Film Critics Association Awards: Silver Condor; Best Actress, for Betibú; 2015 (nom).
- Argentine Film Critics Association Awards: Silver Condor; Best Actress, for Familia Sumergida; 2019 (won).
- Argentine Film Critics Association Awards: Silver Condor; Best Supporting Actress, for El Ángel; 2019 (nom).
- Karlovy Vary International Film Festival: Best Actress, for Sueño Florianópolis; 2018 (won).
