= Horacio Fontova =

Argentinian actor (1946–2020)

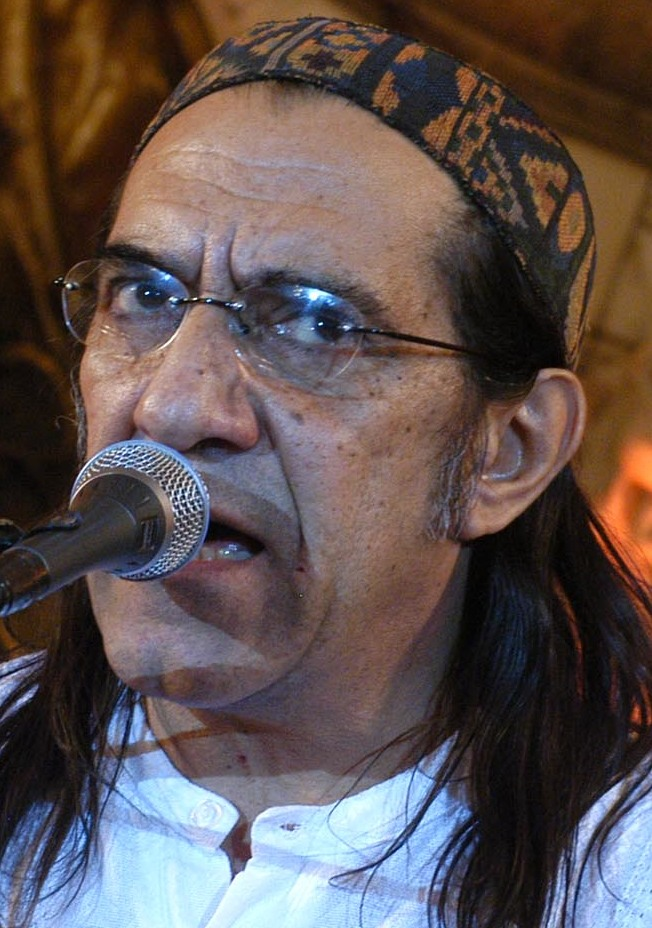
- Horacio Fontova in July 2006
- Born: Horacio González Fontova; 30 October 1946; Buenos Aires
- Died: 20 April 2020 (aged 73); Buenos Aires
- Occupations: Actor, comedian and singer-songwriter

Horacio González Fontova (30 October 1946 – 20 April 2020) was an Argentine actor, singer-songwriter and comedian.

== Biography ==
He was born in Buenos Aires.

He was known for his roles in The Plague (1992), Aballay (2011) and Underdogs (2013). He appeared in the Argentine historical television series Algo habrán hecho por la historia argentina.

Fontova died of cancer in Buenos Aires on 20 April 2020, aged 73.
