= Asociación de Periodistas de la Televisión y Radiofonía Argentina =

Argentine association of journalists

The Asociación de Periodistas de la Televisión y Radiofonía Argentina (APTRA) (Spanish: Association of journalists of Argentine television and radio) is an Argentine association of journalists, established in 1959. They give the Martín Fierro Awards each year, except in the 1976–1988 period.
