= Martín Fierro Awards =

Argentine TV and radio award

- Current: 52nd Martín Fierro Awards
- Awarded for: Best in television and radio
- Country: Argentina
- Presented by: APTRA
- First award: 1959
- Website: www.aptra.org.ar

The Martín Fierro Awards (Spanish: Premios Martín Fierro) are awards for Argentine radio and television, granted by APTRA, the Association of Argentine Television and Radio Journalists.

== History ==
The awards were first given in 1959, limited to television. The next year, the awards adopted their current name, after José Hernández' epic poem Martín Fierro (considered by some as the national epic of Argentina). It was embodied on a statuette of the gaucho Martín Fierro, by sculptor Luis Perlotti, weighing over 2 kilograms (4 lb). When the award began, the sole television station in the country was Channel 7. As the media outlets grew, the awards expanded to incorporate media from throughout the country. In 1967, radio productions were included in the awards for the first time. Nowadays there is a special rotating venue, honoring the winners from all the Provinces.

Because of the censorship and persecution of artists carried over during the 1976-83 military dictatorship, the membership of APTRA dwindled and the awards were suspended. It was not until 1988 that the award was revived. Since 1995, it has also included special productions for cable networks, and – in 1992 – the Golden Martín Fierro was added to honor the "best of the best". In 2004, the voting became computerized to make it both more secure and simpler, as well as allowing voting to take place immediately before broadcasting.

In 2023, the 51st edition of the awards was held on Sunday 9 July at the Hilton Hotel in Buenos Aires, when the Gold award went to Telefe's Gran Hermano (Big Brother). Susana Gimenez received the Martin Fierro Lifetime Achievement Award, while actor Antonio Gasalla won the Martin Fierro Tribute Award. A new international edition, called the Martín Fierro Latino Awards, was presented on Monday 27 November 2023 at the Manuel Artime Theater in Miami, Florida, U.S.

== Inaugural awards ==
The first year the awards were given, 1959, the ceremony took place at the Cervantes National Theater and the inductees included:

- Best actress: Myriam de Urquijo (La vida de los otros)
- Best actor: Pedro López Lagar (Teatro de Arthur Miller)
- Best suspense: Luís Medina Castro (Historia de jóvenes)
- Best comedian: Dringue Farías (La familia Gesa se divierte)
- Best comic actress Olinda Bozán (El show de Pablo Palitos)
- Best soap opera: Historia de jóvenes
- Best news program: Sala de periodistas
- Best entertainment program: Cabalgata Gillette hasta el infinito
- Best coordinator: Orlando Marconi (Cinemaspesos)
- Best male announcer: Adolfo Salinas
- Best female announcer: Nelly Trenti
- Best trap: Alén "we can say the surname"
- Stage direction: Narciso Ibáñez Menta

== Special awards ==
In 1991 APTRA created a special award, the Golden Martín Fierro award. It is given to a single person or production in the annual ceremony, and it is intended as a prize to trajectory or to outstanding quality. The first winner was the host show "Fax", and the most recent one the TV series 100 días para enamorarse. A second main prize, the Platinum Martín Fierro Award, was added in 2009, per the 50th anniversary of APTRA. The first winner of it was Mirtha Legrand.

== See also ==
- Latin American television awards
