= List of Golden Martín Fierro Award winners =

Golden Martín Fierro Award
- Awarded for: Individual with an outstanding career or recent production of outstanding quality
- Country: Argentina
- Presented by: APTRA
- First award: 1992
- Currently held by: MasterChef Celebrity Argentina (TV); Pampita (Cable TV); Lay May (Radio)
- Website: aptra.org.ar

The Golden Martín Fierro Award is presented annually by the Asociación de Periodistas de la Televisión y Radiofonía Argentina (APTRA) (Spanish: Association of journalists of Argentine television and radio). It is given to honor an Argentine individual with an outstanding career in the media of Argentina or a recent production of outstanding quality. APTRA described the standard as "the best among the best". It was first awarded in 1992 at the Martín Fierro Awards ceremony for works from 1991. It is a special award, unrelated to the regular ones, which are distributed in categories. A second award, the Platinum Martín Fierro Award, is selected by public poll among the previous recipients of the Golden award. This second award was created in 2009 for works from 2008, but there was no Platinum award for the 2013 ceremony. The awards for the cable television were split to their own ceremony, with its own Golden Martín Fierro in 2015.

The talk show Fax was the first recipient of the award, and, as of 2018, (Note: 2019 and 2020 awards have been postponed due to the COVID-19 pandemic) 100 días para enamorarse is the most recent. No recipient has received the award twice, but Nicolás Repetto, host of Fax, received a personal one in 2000. Facundo Arana, Julio Chávez, Mercedes Morán, Celeste Cid, Carla Peterson, Nancy Dupláa, Pablo Echarri, Diego Peretti and Gabriela Toscano have been lead actors of different works of fiction that received the award.

== Winners ==
In the following table, the years are listed per APTRA convention, and generally correspond to the year when the productions were aired. The Martín Fierro award ceremonies are always held the following year. The ceremonies have no nominees for the Golden award, which is announced at the end once all the regular awards have been received. The award may be given to either a person with an outstanding career or recent production of outstanding quality. When the award is received by a production, the Starring column lists the people that worked in it, such as TV hosts or lead actors. The TV channel / Radio station column lists either the channel or station that aired the production, or the channel or station where the person worked at the year of the award.

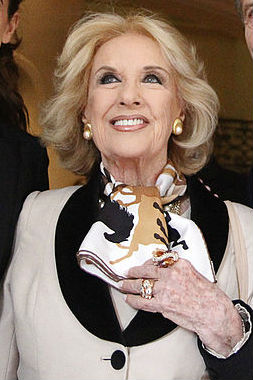
Mirtha Legrand won the 1992 award.

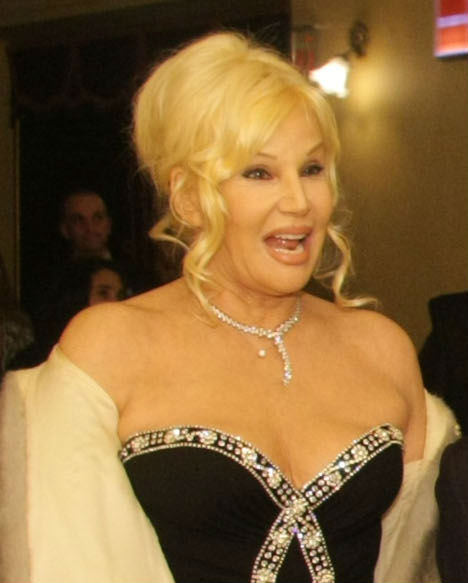
Susana Giménez won the 1995 award.

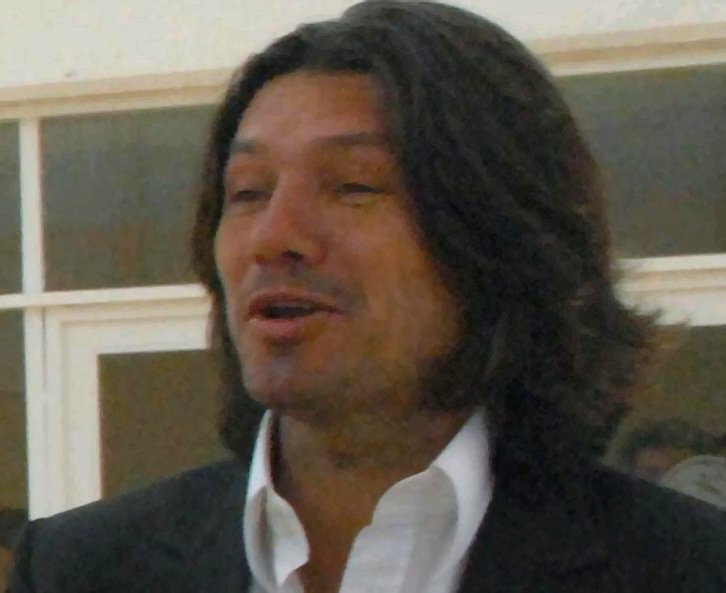
Marcelo Tinelli won the 1997 award.

List of winners of the Golden Martín Fierro Award
Year	Production or person	Genre or occupation	Starring	TV channel / Radio station	Reference
1991	Fax	Talk show	Nicolás Repetto	El Trece	
1992	Mirtha Legrand	Actress and television presenter		Canal 9	
1993	Magdalena Ruiz Guiñazú	Journalist and radio presenter		Radio Mitre	
1994	Antonio Gasalla	Comedian		El Trece	
1995	Susana Giménez	Actress and television presenter		Telefe	
1996	Santo Biasatti	Journalist		Radio Rivadavia	
1997	Marcelo Tinelli	Television presenter		Telefe	
1998	Fútbol de Primera	Sport	Enrique Macaya Márquez and Marcelo Araujo	El Trece	
1999	Nicolás Repetto	Television presenter		Telefe	
2000	Telenoche	News program	Mónica Cahen D'Anvers and César Mascetti	El Trece	
2001	Culpables	Miniseries	Mercedes Morán and Diego Peretti	El Trece	
2002	Los Simuladores	Miniseries	Federico D'Elía, Alejandro Fiore, Diego Peretti and Martín Seefeld	Telefe	
2003	Resistiré	Telenovela	Pablo Echarri and Celeste Cid	Telefe	
2004	Padre Coraje	Telenovela	Facundo Arana and Nancy Dupláa	El Trece	
2005	Mujeres asesinas	Anthology series	Different cast for each episode	El Trece	
2006	Montecristo	Telenovela	Pablo Echarri and Paola Krum	Telefe	
2007	Lalola	Telenovela	Carla Peterson and Luciano Castro	América 2	
2008	Vidas robadas	Telenovela	Facundo Arana and Soledad Silveyra	Telefe	
2009	Tratame bien	Miniseries	Julio Chávez and Cecilia Roth	El Trece	
2010	Para vestir santos	Miniseries	Gabriela Toscano, Celeste Cid and Griselda Siciliani	El Trece	
2011	El puntero	Miniseries	Julio Chávez and Gabriela Toscano	El Trece	
2012	Graduados	Telenovela	Nancy Dupláa, Daniel Hendler, Luciano Cáceres and Isabel Macedo	Telefe	
2013	Farsantes	Telenovela	Julio Chávez, Facundo Arana, Griselda Siciliani, Benjamín Vicuña, Alfredo Casero	El Trece	
2014	Guapas	Telenovela	Mercedes Morán, Carla Peterson, Florencia Bertotti, Isabel Macedo, Araceli González	El Trece	
2015	Jorge Lanata	Investigative journalism		El Trece	
2016	El Marginal	Miniseries	Juan Minujín, Martina Gusmán	Televisión Pública Argentina	
2017	Un gallo para Esculapio	Miniseries	Luis Brandoni, Peter Lanzani, Luis Luque, Julieta Ortega, Ariel Staltari, Eleonora Wexler	Telefe	
2018	100 días para enamorarse	Telenovela	Carla Peterson, Nancy Dupláa, Luciano Castro and Juan Minujín	Telefe	
2019 (Note: Postponed due to the COVID-19 pandemic.)					
2020					
2021	MasterChef Celebrity Argentina	Reality	Santiago del Moro, Donato de Santis, Damian Betular, Germán Martitegui, Dolly Irigoyen	Telefe	
2022					

== Networks with most awards ==
List of networks with most Golden Martín Fierro Awards
TV channel / Radio station	Awards
El Trece	13
Telefe	11
América 2	1
Canal 9	1
Radio Mitre	1
Radio Rivadavia	1
Televisión Pública Argentina	1

== Platinum awards ==
List of winners of the Platinum Martín Fierro Award
Year	Production or person	References
2008	Mirtha Legrand	
2009	Susana Giménez	
2010	Marcelo Tinelli	
2011	Antonio Gasalla	

== Cable television awards ==
List of winners of the Golden Martín Fierro Award for cable television
Year	Production or person	References
2014	En el Camino	
2015	Nelson Castro	
2016	La Jaula de la Moda	
2017	A Dos Voces	
2018	El host	
2019 (Note: Postponed due to the COVID-19 pandemic. Was held jointly with the 2020 awards.)	Bios, vidas que marcaron la tuya: Luis Alberto Spinetta	
2020 (Note: 2019 prize was awarded jointly alongside 2020 as the 2019 ceremony had been postponed due to the COVID-19 pandemic.)	Samuel "Chiche" Gelblung	
