= Germán Paoloski =

Argentine journalist, TV presenter and sports leader

- Born: May 25, 1974 (age 51); Coronel Suárez, Buenos Aires, Argentina
- Education: Escuela Superior de Ciencias Deportivas
- Alma mater: University of Buenos Aires
- Occupations: Journalist, television host and sports leader
- Years active: 1996–present
- Height: 1.75 m (5 ft 9 in)
- Partner(s): Silvina Escudero (2002-2006); Sabrina Garciarena (2009-present)
- Children: León Paoloski (b. 2014); Beltrán Paoloski (b. 2017); Mía Paoloski (b. 2020)

Germán Paoloski (born May 25, 1974, in Coronel Suárez, Buenos Aires, Argentina) is an Argentine journalist, TV presenter and sports leader.

== Biography ==
Germán Paoloski study in the Escuela Superior de Ciencias Deportivas. Germán Paoloski studied Social Communication at University of Buenos Aires.

== Personal life ==
From 2002 to 2006 Germán Paoloski was in a relationship with Silvina Escudero. Since 2009 Germán Paoloski is in a relationship with the actress Sabrina Garciarena. On April 1, 2014, they became parents for the first time of a boy whom they called León Paoloski. On May 23, 2017, they became parents for the second time of a boy whom they called Beltrán Paoloski. On May 5, 2020, they became parents for the third time of a girl whom they called Mía Paoloski. Germán Paoloski lives in Buenos Aires, Argentina with Sabrina Garciarena and his children.

== Career ==
Germán Paoloski started in sports journalism in 1996, with Fernando Niembro and Marcelo Araujo in Radio La Red station for which he made different sports broadcasts. Since 1997 he covered the playing field in the football broadcasts of the Argentina national team for Telefe and since 2002 he was a commentator on the Telefe and Fox Sports. Between 1997 and 2005 he covered the playing field in soccer broadcasts for América TV, TyC Sports and Fútbol de Primera for Canal 13. From 2003 to 2009 he was the Television Presenter of Fútbol para todos broadcast by Fox Sports. In 2007 he was the Host of the Martín Fierro Awards broadcast by Fox Sports. Between 2009 and 2014 he was the Television Presenter of the nightly news of Diario de medianoche broadcast by Telefe. Between 2010 and 2014 he was the Television Presenter of Pura Química broadcast by ESPN+ every day at 2:00 pm, which was also broadcast live on FM 107.9 ESPN Radio. Between 2013 and 2014 he was the Television Presenter of the program Guatsap on the radio station Los 40 principales together with José Chatruc, Cristian Domínguez, Martin Catramado and Paula Varela. In 2015, after passing through ESPN+ and ESPN Radio he was launched by the screen of Fox Sports with the program Nunca es Tarde together with José Chatruc, Darío Barassi and DJ Tommy Muñoz. During 2017 he was part of Radio Rivadavia with the program Vuelta y vuelta. In the month of March 2019, after some negotiations in this regard, he returned to Telefe to be the Television Presenter of the program El noticiero de la gente together with Milva Castellini. On 11 March 2019 the San Luis de Quillota released a statement announcing Germán Paoloski as the new team president that was in the last position of the first B of Chile.

== Filmography ==
=== Television Programs ===
Year	Program	Channel	Notes
1997	Fútbol de Primera	Canal 13	Collaborator
1998	Copa Mundial de Fútbol de 1998	Telefe	Host
2002–2010	Telefe noticias a las 20	Telefe	Host
2003–2009	Fútbol para Todos	Fox Sports	Host
2007	Martín Fierro Awards	Fox Sports	Host
2009–2014	Diario de medianoche	Telefe	Host
2010	Diario del Mundial	Telefe	Host
2010	Copa Mundial de Fútbol de 2010	Telefe	Host
2010–2014	Pura Química	ESPN+	Host
2011	Hablemos de Fútbol	ESPN+	Host
2011	Diario de la Copa	Telefe	Host
2012	Todos juntos	Telefe	Host
2012–2013	Operación Triunfo	Telefe	Host
2015–2016	La Mesa Esta Lista	Canal 13	Host
2015–	NET: Nunca es Tarde	Fox Sports	Host
2017	Asombrosamente	National Geographic	Host
2017–2018	Todo tiene un porqué	TV Pública	Host
2019–	El Noticiero de la Gente	Telefe	Host

=== Television ===
Year	Title	Character	Channel
2009	Botineras		Telefe
2012	Dulce Amor	Juanjo	Telefe
2012	Graduados		Telefe
