= Tratame bien =

- Left: José (Julio Chávez). Right: Sofía (Cecilia Roth)
- Genre: Drama
- Created by: Adrián Suar
- Developed by: Pol-Ka
- Written by: Pablo Lago; Susana Cardozo
- Directed by: Daniel Barone
- Starring: Julio Chávez; Cecilia Roth
- Theme music composer: Fito Páez
- Opening theme: "Tratame bien"
- Country of origin: Argentina
- Original language: Spanish
- No. of seasons: 1
- No. of episodes: 37

Original release
- Network: Canal 13
- Release: April 15 – December 23, 2009

Related
- Socias; Para vestir santos

Tratame bien (Spanish: Treat me nice) is an Argentine television series made by Pol-Ka. It was awarded with seven Martín Fierro Awards in May 2010, including the golden one.

== Plot ==
The main characters of the series are a married couple, facing a matrimonial crisis. José works at a toyshop near bankruptcy, while Sofía is successful in her work but without being happy from it. They have 2 children that deal with their own maturity crisis as well.

== Cast ==
- Julio Chávez as José
- Cecilia Roth as Sofía
- Cristina Banegas as Clara
- María Onetto as Elsa
- Norman Briski as Arturo

=== Secondary characters ===
- Martín Slipak as Damián
- María Alche as Helena
- Guillermo Arengo as Hernán
- Mónica Cabrera as Rosa
- Chunchuna Villafañe as Mecha (Sofía's mother)
- Federico Luppi as Moncho (Sofía's father)
- Alfredo Casero as Nacho
- Mario Moscoso as Laurencio

=== Guest appearances ===
- Noemí Frenkel as Nora
- María Carambula as Caro
- Leticia Brédice as Sabrina
- Daniel Fanego as Carlos
- Alejo Ortíz as Nahuel
- Juan Minujín as Mauricio
- Griselda Siciliani as Denise
- Ana Garibaldi as Laura
- Leonor Manso as Mabel
- Paloma Contreras as Gisella
- Fabián Vena as Ezequiel
- Denise Nenezian as Izabella

== Awards ==
=== Clarín awards 2009 ===
- Best TV series
- Best director
- Best drama actor (Julio Chávez)
- Male revelation (Martín Slipak)

=== Martín Fierro awards 2009 ===
- Golden Martín Fierro
- Best director
- Best author
- Best script writer
- Best lead actor of TV series (Julio Chávez)
- Best lead actress of TV series (Cecilia Roth)
- Best guest appearance in fiction (Federico Luppi)
- Best secondary actress in drama (Cristina Banegas)
