= Enrique Macaya Márquez =

Argentine sports journalist

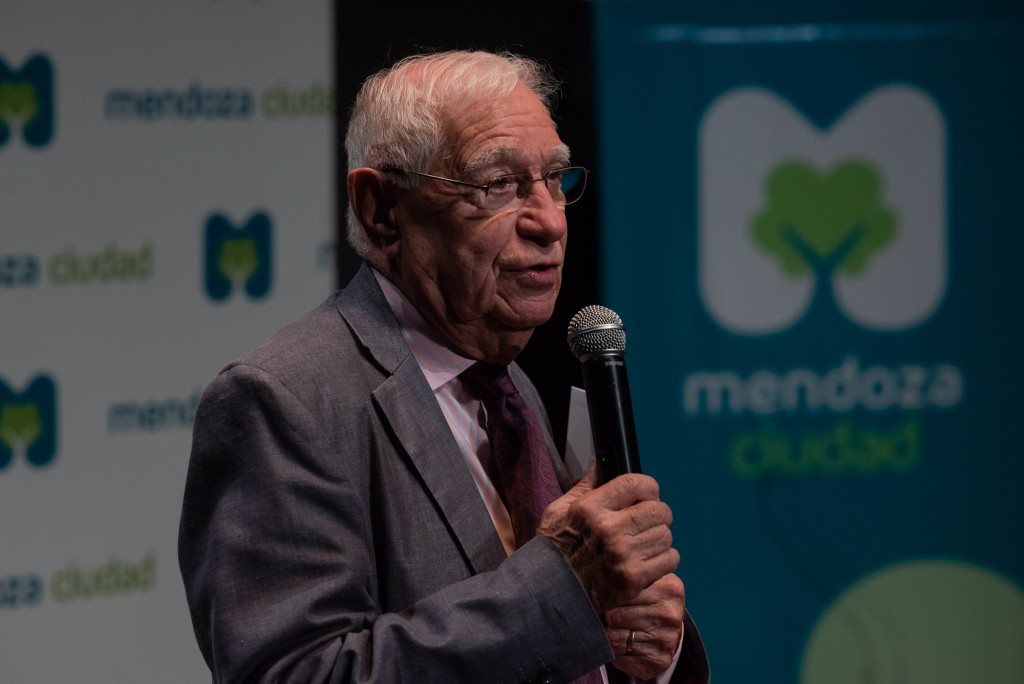
Enrique Macaya Márquez in 2018

Enrique Macaya Márquez (born November 20, 1934) is an Argentine sports journalist. He worked on Fútbol de Primera from 1985 to 2009. He has also worked for magazines Ten Points and El Campeón, and for the newspapers Noticias Gráficas, Convicción and La Nación. He has been declared a noteworthy personality of sport journalism by the legislature of Buenos Aires, on July 15, 2007. As of 2026, he covered a record of 18 consecutive FIFA World Cup tournaments.

== Early life ==
At the age of 8 Márquez distributed newspapers in the neighborhood of Flores, and at 15 he was a cadet at the Radio El Mundo, where he became a commercial manager. He also created the subsidiary station in the province of Jujuy.

Enrique Macaya Márquez lives in Floresta. His wife Noemí died in 2016. They have two children: Andrea and Gabriel, and three grandchildren.

== Career ==
Enrique Macaya Márquez started his television career in 1966, commenting football and Formula One on Channel 7. During the 1966 World Cup in England he provided radio broadcasts on El Mundo radio for Argentina. In 1966 he published the book “Mi visión del fútbol" (My vision of football). In the late 1970s he commented football matches on ATC.

In 2000s, Márquez was a TV presenter of the Fútbol de Primera program and Sunday's classic commentator along with Marcelo Araujo and then Sebastián Vignolo. During the 2010 World Cup, he was a commentator on Fox Sports and wrote articles to Diario Clarín. Between 2013 and 2016 he was a part of TyC Sports as TV presenter of the Indirecto show. During the World Cup 2014 he commented Argentina matches along with Walter Nelson.

As a journalist Márquez has covered 18 Football World Cups, with the first one in Sweden in 1958. FIFA confirmed him to be the journalist who covered the most Football World Cups in history. On this occasion the organization awarded him a special recognition. In 2018, he presented his new book "Mis Mundiales" (My World Cups), in which he described the coverages of the World Cups, naming the Netherlands national football team of 1974 the best among all the world champions.

During his career he worked as a sports commentator for various broadcasters such as Colonia, Belgrano, Province, Rivadavia (with José María Muñoz), Mitre, La Red and Radio del Plata.

== Publications ==
- 1996 - Mi visión del fútbol (My vision of Football)
- 2018 - Mis mundiales: de Suecia 58 a Rusia 2018 (My World Cups: from Sweden 58 to Russia 2018)
