= Fútbol para todos =

Argentine sports television programme (2009-2017)

Fútbol para todos (Football for Everyone) is an Argentine television programme that presented matches and tournaments of the Argentine Primera División, Primera B Nacional and Copa Argentina, as well as matches of the Copa Libertadores and Copa Sudamericana when teams from Argentina are involved and some matches of the Argentina national football team. It aired from 2009 to 2017, with the final program airing on 27 June 2017.

The program was aired by TV Pública Digital, the state broadcaster, with matches aired by various stations in the interior of the country. In its final year, other commercial broadcasters joined the broadcast.

== History ==
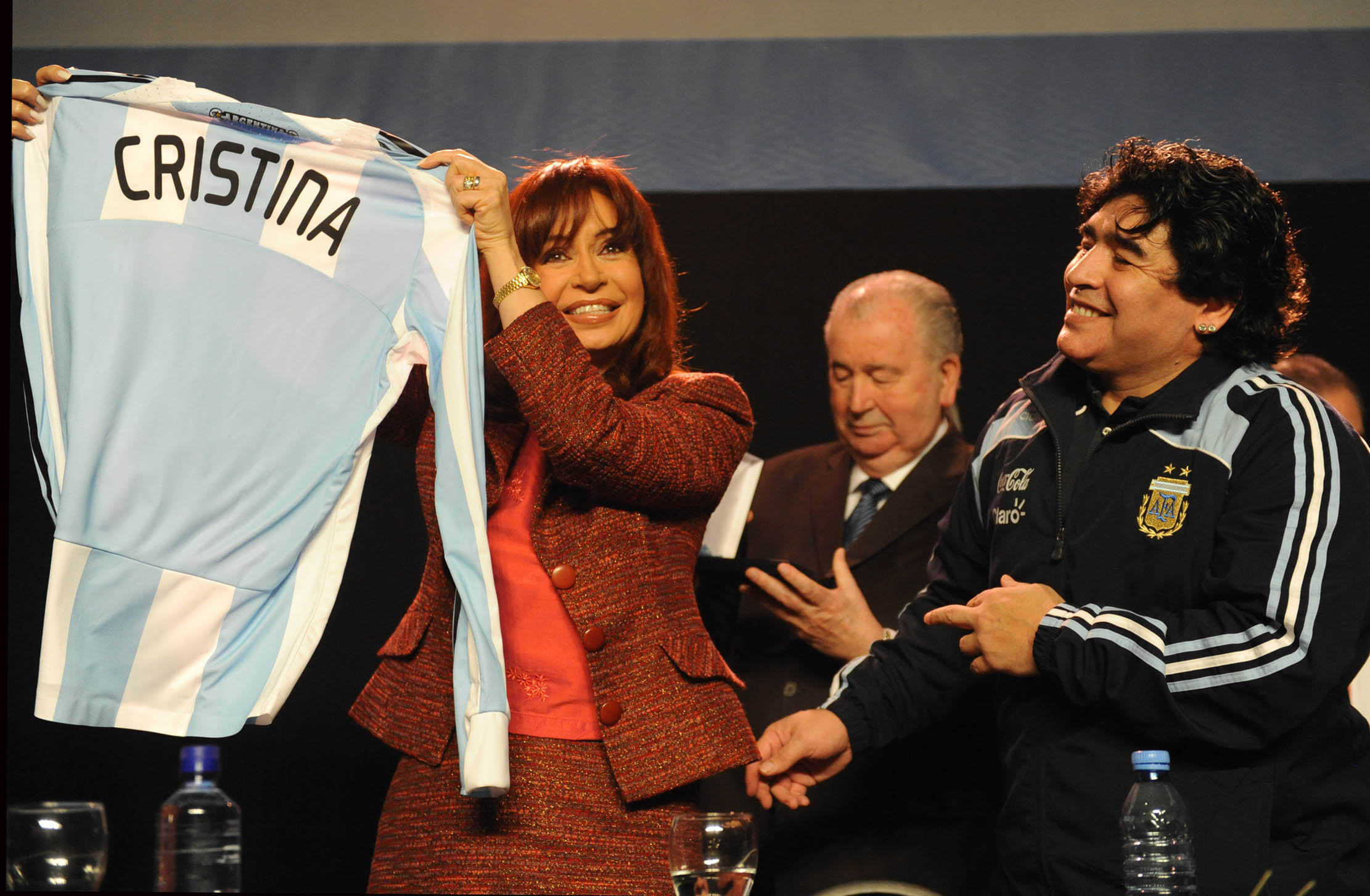
Cristina Fernández de Kirchner, Julio Grondona and Diego Maradona during the cadena nacional that introduced Fútbol para Todos

From 1991 to 2009, the rights to Primera División matches were held by Televisión Satélite Codificada, a company co-owned by Grupo Clarín and Torneos y Competencias. Most of the matches were broadcast on the cable channel TyC Sports, and some were broadcast as pay-per-view events. The rights included a restriction for other outlets: until the Sunday night highlights show Fútbol de Primera was broadcast, no other media could air highlights of the matches.

After the 2008-09 season, several Primera División clubs began to run into severe financial troubles that also put the 2009-10 championship at risk. The Argentine Football Association (AFA) asked TSC to pay 720 million pesos to ameliorate the situation, but TSC, which had already paid 230 million pesos to the AFA, declined, saying that the payment would put the company at risk of major losses.

On 8 August 2009, the Argentine government made an offer for 600 million pesos for the rights to broadcast the games, which would be placed on over-the-air television. Three days later, the AFA announced it was breaking the contract it had with TSC, which extended until 2014, and on 20 August, President Cristina Fernández de Kirchner announced in a cadena nacional that over-the-air TV stations would offer free broadcasts of the matches. The deal was to run ten years, beginning with a 21 August match between Gimnasia and Godoy Cruz.

In 2011, the AFA broke its television contract with TRISA, another joint venture between Clarín and TyC, for Primera B Nacional matches.

Fútbol para Todos also carried World Cup qualifying matches and the 2014 FIFA World Cup.

== Broadcast ==
The Fútbol para todos broadcast included its own announcers and advertising, which all repeaters carried. At the beginning and end of its time, FPT was successful in luring advertisers to its broadcasts. However, in February 2010, after just six months on the air, all but two advertisers were forced out. One was truck manufacturer Iveco, which paid for some of the air time in trucks; the other was the Argentine presidency. The program was described as "a factory of official announcements". In 2014, agricultural implement maker New Holland replaced Iveco.

In 2011, repeats began to be shown on Gol TV, which was replaced in 2012 with the startup state-run channel DeporTV. Also in 2011, the first high definition broadcast was conducted, of a Superclásico match between Boca Juniors and River Plate.

Internationally, Fútbol para Todos matches were screened on TyC Sports Latin America, ESPN, Fox Sports and Claro Sports in Latin America; TyC Sports USA, ESPN Deportes, Fox Deportes and GolTV in the United States; TV Esporte Interativo, ESPN, Fox Sports and SporTV in Brazil; and Canal+ (in Spain).

== Criticism ==
As an official program and initiative of the federal government, Fútbol para todos received support from cultural and sports figures in Argentina, but also criticism from opposition politicians. Senator Gerardo Morales noted that the presidential advertising on the program was "shameless", while members of the PRO party noted that "the purpose of its broadcast is not public but partisan." Government supporters responded that the average spending on the program was far less than that on the Teatro Colón in Buenos Aires when divided by the number of viewers.

In 2010, two environmental NGOs noted that 144 million pesos had been diverted from funds earmarked to implement a forestry law to Fútbol para Todos.

Several criminal proceedings have been launched against government officials over mismanagement of funds earned from FPT. Former Cabinet Chiefs Aníbal Fernández and Jorge Capitanich, along with one-time coordinator Gabriel Mariotto and a group of former directors of the AFA, are all being investigated.

== Closure and return to pay TV ==
The election of Mauricio Macri as president in 2015 signified major changes for almost every aspect of Argentine government policy. It was decided to wind down Fútbol para Todos and to return the rights to pay broadcasters. In an interim step, in early 2016, commercial broadcast television stations began carrying matches alongside TVP (the Copa Argentina was also picked up by TyC Sports after the government returned the rights to the AFA), and at the same time, commercial advertising returned.

On February 24, the government informed the AFA that it was to end the contract two years early. The final broadcasts of Fútbol para Todos, two matches on the same day, occurred on 27 June 2017. Beginning with the 2017-18 tournament, a consortium of Fox Sports and Turner will hold the exclusive rights to Primera División tournaments. Fox Sports's three Argentina channels, as well as Turner channels to be named, will carry the matches.

From 2009 through February 2017, the Argentina government had spent 10.178 billion pesos on the transmission of Fútbol para Todos.

== Awards ==
=== Nominations ===
- 2013 Martín Fierro Awards
  - Best TV production
  - Best sports program
