= Biasatti =

Biasatti is an Italian surname. Notable people with the surname include:

- Hank Biasatti (1922–1996), Italian-born baseball and basketball player
- Santo Biasatti (born 1943), Argentine journalist

== See also ==
- Renato Biasutti
