= Mónica Cahen D'Anvers =

Argentine journalist (born 1934)

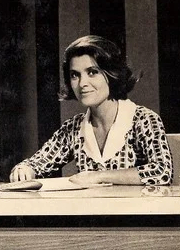
Cahen D'Anvers hosting Telenoche in 1966

Mónica Cahen d'Anvers (born November 7, 1934) is an Argentine journalist and TV news host.

The daughter of French aristocrat Comte Gilbert George Louis Cahen d'Anvers and María Elina Láinez Peralta de Alvear, she completed her studies at Cambridge University.

Cahen d'Anvers began working on the TV news programme Telenoche in 1966 with Tomás Eloy Martinez and Andrés Percivale. She and César Mascetti (presenters of Telenoche since 1992) received the Golden Martín Fierro award in 2001 for their long work. They were married in 2003 and left Telenoche in 2004, moving to work on the radio program "Mónica y César" on Radio del Plata.
