= The Official Story =

1985 film

- Theatrical release poster
- Spanish: La historia oficial
- Directed by: Luis Puenzo
- Written by: Aída Bortnik; Luis Puenzo
- Produced by: Marcelo Piñeyro
- Starring: Héctor Alterio; Norma Aleandro; Hugo Arana; Guillermo Battaglia; Chela Ruiz; Patricio Contreras; Aníbal Morixe; María Luisa Robledo; Jorge Petraglia; Analía Castro; Chunchuna Villafañe
- Cinematography: Félix Monti
- Edited by: Juan Carlos Macías
- Music by: Atilio Stampone; Song: María Elena Walsh
- Production companies: Historias Cinematograficas Cinemania; Progress Communications
- Distributed by: Almi Pictures (US theatrical)
- Release date: 3 April 1985 (Argentina)
- Running time: 112 minutes
- Country: Argentina
- Language: Spanish

The Official Story (Spanish: La historia oficial) is a 1985 Argentine historical political drama film directed by Luis Puenzo and written by Puenzo and Aída Bortnik. It stars Norma Aleandro, Héctor Alterio, Chunchuna Villafañe and Hugo Arana. In the United Kingdom, it was released as The Official Version.

The film deals with the story of an upper middle class couple who lives in Buenos Aires with an illegally adopted child. The mother comes to realize that her daughter may be the child of a desaparecida, a victim of the forced disappearances that occurred during Argentina's last military dictatorship (1976–1983), which saw widespread human rights violations, including many thousands of murders.

Among several other international awards, it won the Oscar for Best Foreign Language Film at the 58th Academy Awards, a first for a Latin American film. The film also won the People's Choice Award at the 10th Toronto International Film Festival.

It was selected as the eighth greatest Argentine film of all time in a poll conducted by the Museo del Cine Pablo Ducrós Hicken in 2000. In a new version of the survey organized in 2022 by the specialized magazines La vida util, Taipei and La tierra quema, presented at the Mar del Plata International Film Festival, the film reached the 28 position. Also in 2022, the film was included in Spanish magazine Fotogramas's list of the 20 best Argentine films of all time.

== Plot ==
The film is set in Argentina in 1983, in the final year of the country's last military dictatorship, during which a campaign of state-sponsored terrorism produced thousands of killings and torture of accused political leftists and innocents alike, who were buried in unmarked graves or became desaparecidos.

Alicia Maquet, a high school history teacher, and her husband, Roberto Ibañez, a government official, live in Buenos Aires with their 5-year-old adopted daughter, Gaby. Alicia, like other members of the Argentine upper-middle class, is not aware of how much killing and suffering has gone on in the country, and naively believes only guilty people are arrested.

Alicia's views are challenged by a fellow teacher, Benítez (Patricio Contreras), and some of her students. During a discussion about the death of Argentinean founding father Mariano Moreno, one student, Costa, argues that the government-issued history textbooks are "written by murderers."

Ana, Alicia's longtime friend, returns from exile in Europe and explains why she never told Alicia she was leaving. At first Ana laughs as she tells of her apartment being ransacked by officials, but soon begins to sob as she describes being held captive and tortured for having lived with Pedro, who was labeled as subversive, even though she hadn't seen him in two years. She says that while she was held captive, she witnessed pregnant women leave to give birth but return without their babies, whom she believes were sold to rich couples.

Alicia increasingly wonders about Gaby's origins and asks questions about Gaby's birth, a topic her husband has told her to ignore. Alicia asks why they celebrate the day they brought her home rather than the day she was born, and whether or not Roberto actually met Gaby's mother. Roberto insists it was a normal adoption.

Costa continues to provoke his classmates, and one day Alicia arrives to see newspaper accounts of the desaparecidos taped to the blackboard. When Alicia reports the student, Benítez intervenes to protect him. Alicia gradually becomes friendly with Benítez as her research brings her closer to the truth.

While seeking Gaby's hospital birth records, Alicia learns of an organization searching for missing children. She meets Sara, whose pregnant daughter was kidnapped by the armed forces, and believes Gaby may be her granddaughter. Sara has a photo of her daughter at Gaby's age, looking identical to Gaby.

Roberto faces stress at work due to the machinations of his colleagues, several of whom disappear over the course of the film. Ana confronts him and accuses him of denouncing her and causing her arrest. He also comes into friction with his liberal father and brother, who frown on his ties to the ruling conservative military elite and argue in favor of social justice.

Alicia brings Sara home to meet Roberto, but he is infuriated and demands that Sara leave. After Alicia realizes he does not care about knowing the truth about Gaby's parents, she informs Roberto that Gaby is not at home and asks him how he feels not knowing where his child is, which prompts him to assault her in a fit of rage. The violence is interrupted by a telephone call from Gaby, who is at her grandparents’ house. She asks Roberto to let her sing "En el país de Nomeacuerdo" (In the Country of Idonotremember), a nursery rhyme, to her mother and, after she hangs up, Alicia tearfully grabs her purse and walks out the door, leaving her keys behind.

The final scene shows Gaby sitting in a wicker rocking chair, continuing to sing.

== Cast ==
- Norma Aleandro as Alicia Marnet de Ibáñez
- Héctor Alterio as Roberto Ibáñez
- Chunchuna Villafañe as Ana
- Hugo Arana as Enrique
- Guillermo Battaglia as José
- Chela Ruiz as Sara
- Patricio Contreras as Benítez
- María Luisa Robledo as Nata
- Aníbal Morixe as Miller
- Jorge Petraglia as Macci
- Analía Castro as Gaby
- Daniel Lago as Dante
- Augusto Larreta as General
- Pablo Rago as Enrique's son

== Background ==
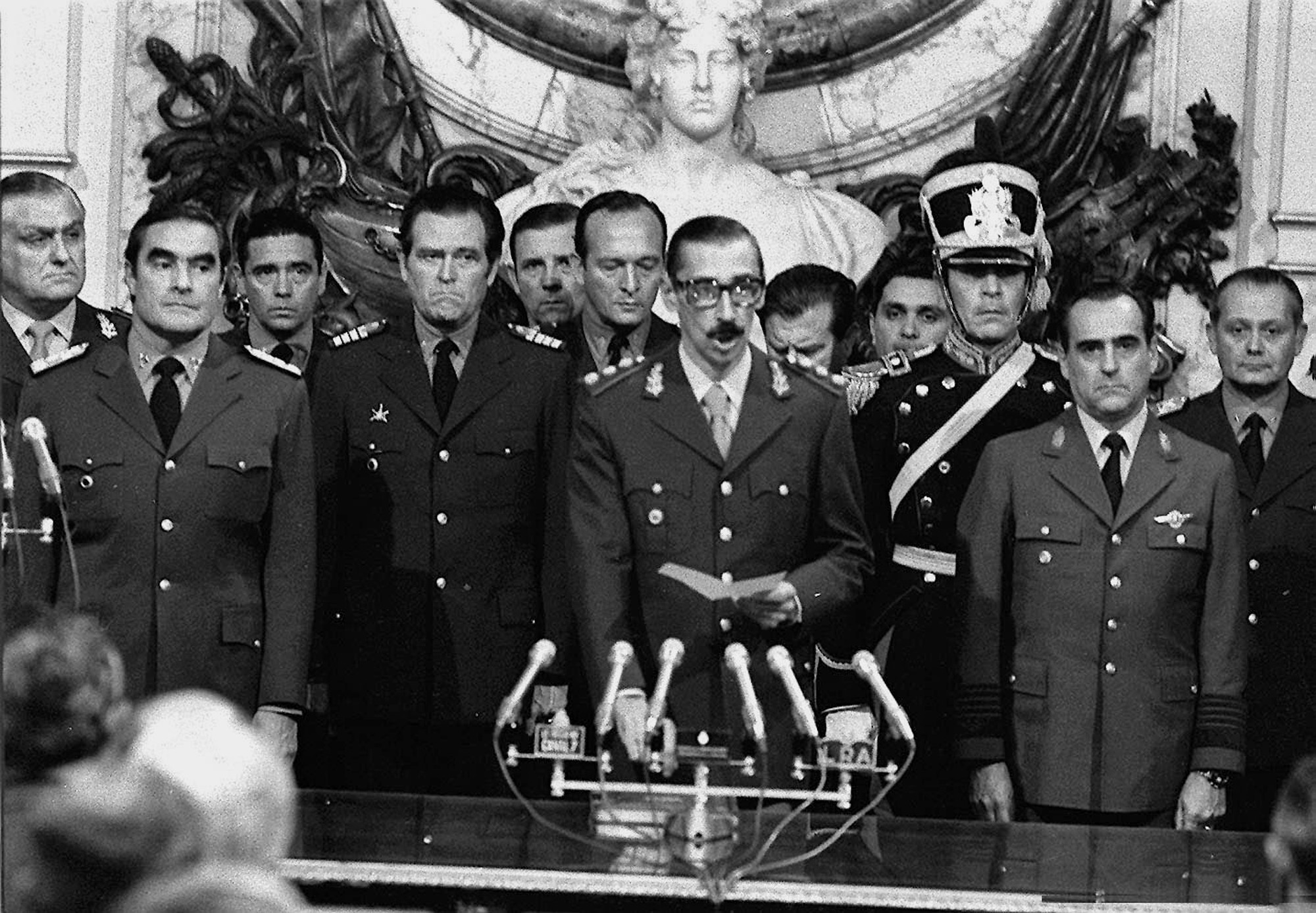
The Military Regime of Argentina (1976–1983) saw widespread repression against those it deemed to be political dissidents.

The film is based on the real political events that took place in Argentina after Jorge Rafael Videla's reactionary military junta assumed power on March 24, 1976. During the junta's rule, Congress was suspended, unions, political parties, and provincial governments were banned, and, in what became known as the Dirty War, between 9,000 and 30,000 people deemed left-wing "subversives" disappeared from society.

Like many progressive actors and others in the country, the lead actress in the film, Norma Aleandro, was forced into exile during this time. She traveled to Uruguay first and Spain later. She returned after the fall of the military government in 1983. Aleandro once said, "Alicia's personal search is also my nation's search for the truth about our history. The film is positive in the way it demonstrates that she can change her life despite all she is losing."

The Official Story can be considered alongside a group of other films that were the first to be made in Argentina after the downfall in 1983 of the last Argentine dictator, Gen. Leopoldo Galtieri, and his autocratic regime. These films deal frankly with the repression, the torture, and the disappearances during Argentina's Dirty War in the 1970s and early 1980s; they include Funny Dirty Little War (1983) and Night of the Pencils (1986). A second group of films, which includes Verónico Cruz (1988) uses metaphor and hints at wider socio-political issues.

== Production ==
At first, director Puenzo, fearing for his safety, intended to shoot the film in secret, using hidden 16mm cameras. But the junta government fell right about the time the screenplay was completed.

The film was entirely shot in the city of Buenos Aires, including the Plaza de Mayo where the Mothers of the Plaza de Mayo congregated in the late 1970s with signs and pictures of desaparecidos who were subjected to forced disappearance by the Argentine military in the Dirty War. The Mothers of the Plaza de Mayo continue to protest every Thursday afternoon at 3:30 pm in the Plaza de Mayo in Buenos Aires.

== Distribution ==
The Official Story first opened in Argentina on April 3, 1985. It has also been featured at various film festivals including the Toronto Festival of Festivals, the Berlin International Film Festival, the Cannes Film Festival, and the Mar del Plata Film Festival. It was picked up for US distribution by Almi Pictures with a wider 1986 theatrical release. In 2015, the film received a 4K restoration performed by worldwide rights holder Historias Cinematograficas Cinemania, with funding by the Argentinian National Film Institute. In May 2018, this 4K restoration made a US screening at the Cannes Classics festival.

== Video release ==
The 1986 US VHS release by Pacific Arts video was a 4:3 cropped TV print with burnt-in English subtitles, but fully uncut with original Spanish audio in mono. This master was reused for the 1999 Fox Lorber DVD and VHS release. In 2003, Koch Lorber put out a remastered US DVD release featuring an HD transfer presented in anamorphic 1.78:1 widescreen, and 5.1 plus original 2.0 Spanish audio tracks. This master was also used for the region 0 NTSC format Australian DVD release by Umbrella Entertainment. In 2011, the film had made its first-ever video debut in the UK by Arrow Video on DVD. Unlike the 2003 Koch Lorber and Umbrella DVDs, the 2011 Arrow DVD is inferior to them due to utilizing a NTSC-PAL converted 4:3 letterbox presentation of the Almi Pictures US theatrical print with burnt-in English subtitles. In 2018, Cohen Media Group picked up US video and digital rights to the 2015 4K restoration, with a remastered DVD and Blu-ray release commencing in October.

== Critical response ==
The film won many awards when first released and, as such, the drama was widely well received in the 1980s. Walter Goodman, film critic for The New York Times, believes the film was well balanced, and wrote, "Mr. Puenzo's film is unwaveringly committed to human rights, yet it imposes no ideology or doctrine. The further miracle is that this is the 39-year-old director's first feature film."

Critic Roger Ebert lauded the film in his film review, writing, "The Official Story is part polemic, part thriller, part tragedy. It belongs on the list with films like Z, Missing and El Norte, which examine the human aspects of political unrest. It is a movie that asks some very hard questions ... Alicia is played in the movie by Norma Aleandro, whose performance won the best actress award at this year's Cannes Film Festival. It is a performance that will be hard to forget, particularly since so much of it is internal. Some of the key moments in the film come as we watch Aleandro and realize what must be taking place inside her mind, and inside her conscience. Most political films play outside the countries that they are about; "The Official Story" is now actually playing in Argentina, where it must be almost unbearably painful for some of the members of its audiences. It was almost as painful for me."

Film critics Frederic and Mary Ann Brussat, of the website Spirituality and Practice, were painfully touched by the story they viewed. They write, "The Official Story is a wrenching and painful drama that crystallizes the horror and the obscenity of political activities that annihilate family solidarity in the name of ideology...The Official Story packs a shattering visceral punch."

A few critics were dismissive of the story Puenzo tells. For example, The Chicago Reader's Dave Kehr thought "Puenzo's methods are so crudely manipulative ... that the film quickly uses up the credit of its good intentions."

On the review aggregator website Rotten Tomatoes, 100% of 13 critics' reviews are positive, with an average rating of 8.4/10.

=== Awards ===
==== Wins ====
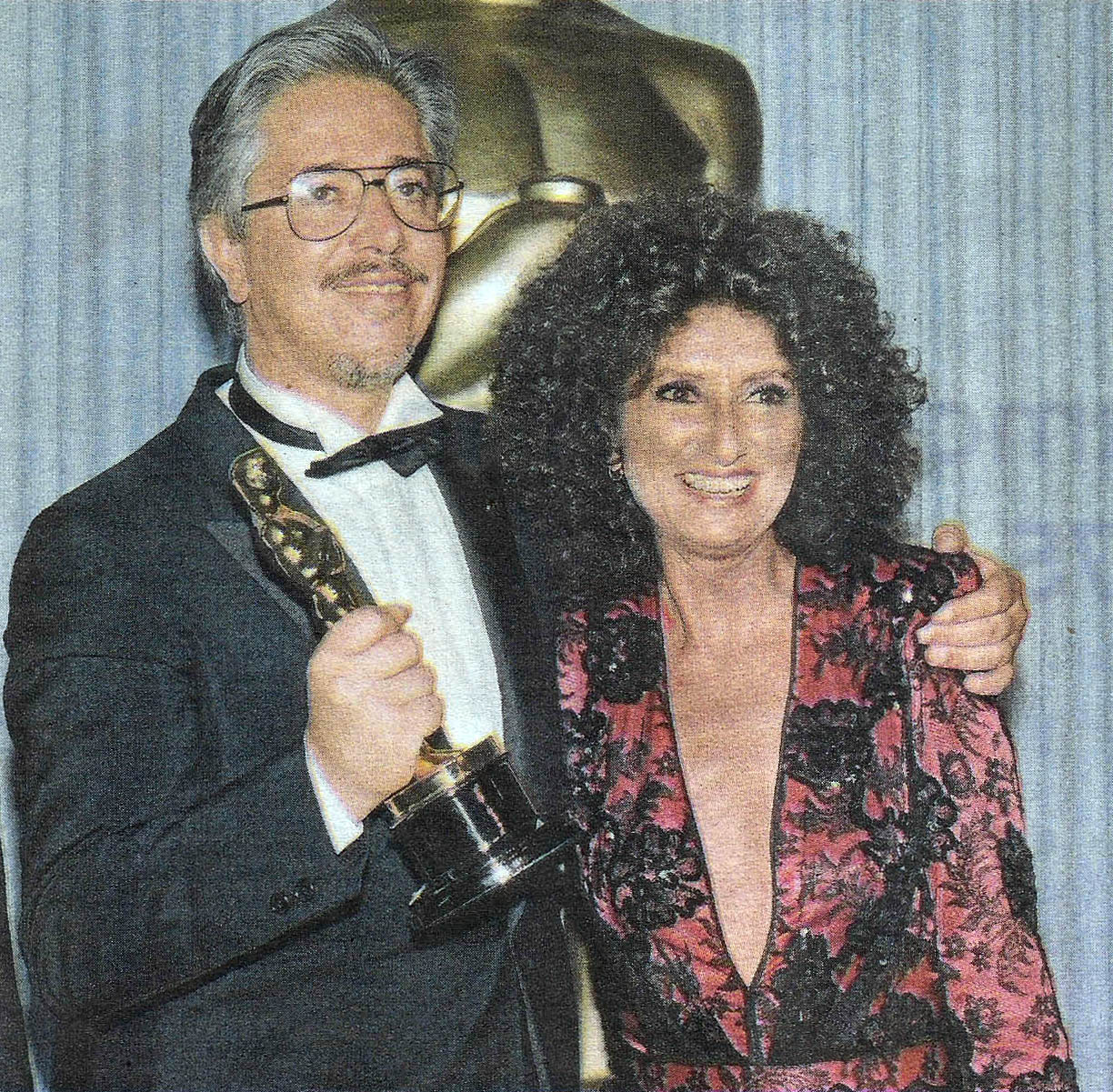
Director Luis Puenzo and actress Norma Aleandro (the latter being one of the co-presenters of the award alongside Jack Valenti) celebrating the Oscar won as "Best Foreign Film" at the 58th Academy Awards

- Academy Awards: Oscar; Best Foreign Film; 1985.
- Los Angeles Film Critics Association Awards: LAFCA Award Best Foreign Film; (tied with Ran); 1985.
- New York Film Critics Circle Awards: NYFCC Award Best Actress; Norma Aleandro; 1985.
- Toronto International Film Festival: People's Choice Award, Luis Puenzo, 1985.
- Premios ACE: Premio ACE Cinema; Best Actress, Norma Aleandro; Cinema - Best Director, Luis Puenzo; Cinema - Best Film; 1986.
- Golden Globes: Best Foreign Language Film; 1986.
- Argentine Film Critics Association Awards: Silver Condor; Best Actress, Norma Aleandro; Best Cinematography, Félix Monti; Best Director, Luis Puenzo; Best Editing, Juan Carlos Macías; Best Film; Best New Actress, Analía Castro; Best Original Screenplay, Aída Bortnik and Luis Puenzo; Best Supporting Actor, Patricio Contreras; Best Supporting Actress, Chela Ruiz; 1986.
- Berlin International Film Festival: Interfilm Award, Otto Dibelius Film Award, Luis Puenzo, (tied with Un Complicato intrigo di donne, vicoli e delitti); 1986.
- Cannes Film Festival: Best Actress, Norma Aleandro; Prize of the Ecumenical Jury, Luis Puenzo; 1985.
- Kansas City Film Critics Circle Awards: KCFCC Award Best Foreign Film; 1986.
- David di Donatello Awards: David Best Foreign Actress, Norma Aleandro; 1987.

==== Nominations ====
- Academy Awards: Best Writing, Screenplay Written Directly for the Screen; 1985.
- Cannes Film Festival: Golden Palm, Luis Puenzo; 1985.
- Sant Jordi Awards: Best Foreign Actress, Norma Aleandro; 1987.
- Best Foreign Language Film, U.S. National Board of Review of Motion Pictures

== See also ==
- Maria Eugenia Sampallo
- The Lost Steps (2001)
- Captive (2005)
- List of submissions to the 58th Academy Awards for Best Foreign Language Film
- List of Argentine submissions for the Academy Award for Best Foreign Language Film
