= No toquen a la nena =

- Directed by: Juan José Jusid
- Written by: Oscar Viale; Jorge Goldemberg
- Produced by: Luis Giudici
- Starring: Luis Politti; Maria Vaner; Norma Aleandro; Lautaro Murúa; Pepe Soriano; Julio de Grazia
- Cinematography: Adolfo Aristarain
- Edited by: Armando Blanco
- Music by: Gustavo Beytelman
- Release date: August 5, 1976
- Running time: 93 minutes
- Country: Argentina
- Language: Spanish

No toquen a la nena ("Don't touch the girl") is a 1976 Argentinian film. It is a comedy of manners directed by Juan José Jusid. The film stars Luis Politti, María Vaner, Norma Aleandro, Lautaro Murúa, Pepe Soriano and Julio de Grazia, among others. Among the roster of extras, the film featured Cecilia Roth in her debut performance, 2 years before she would flee Argentina. When it was released in Argentina, many of its actors had had to go into exile for reasons of political persecution.

The script, written by Oscar Viale and Jorge Goldemberg, received initial approval from the Argentine censors, but was banned before it could be screened. The plot of the film centering on a middle class family dealing with a teen pregnancy, was found to be objectionable by the censors.

The film has a cast of great Argentinian cinema actors, including Julio Chávez in a leading role. In the technical team Adolfo Aristarain acted as assistant director, and Juan Carlos Desanzo in photography, who would later become prominent directors of Argentinian cinema.

== Plot ==
Patricia (Patricia Calderón) is a beautiful 17-year-old teenager who has become pregnant and, in desperation, befriended a friend of her hippie brother, Willy (Julio Chávez), in whom she finds support and understanding. When her father (Luis Politti), an Argentine classic of Italian descent, found out, first she hit Willy hard, believing her to be the father, and then she sought to marry her to her daughter to "save face"

== Cast ==
- Luis Politti as Augusto
- María Vaner as Haydée
- Norma Aleandro as Andrea
- Lautaro Murúa as Horacio
- Pepe Soriano as Severino Di Filippi "El Nono"
- Julio De Grazia as Bambi
- Pierina Dealessi as La Mamma
- Gustavo Rey debuted as Javier
- Julio Chávez as Willy
- Cecilia Roth debuted as Cecilia
- Patricia Calderón as Patricia
- Alberto Busaid as Nacho
- Lidia Catalano as Dorita
- Claudio Lucero as Capataz
- Patricio Contreras as Peón
- Juan Manuel Tenuta as Funes
- Aldo Marinelli as El Médico
- Chunchuna Villafañe as La Mercedes
- Nora Renzi as Flequillo
- Oscar Viale as Porta
- Atilio Polverini
- Divina Gloria
- Gonzalo Urtizberea
