= La revolución es un sueño eterno =

- Directed by: Nemesio Juárez
- Written by: Nemesio Juárez
- Based on: La revolución es un sueño eterno by Andrés Rivera
- Starring: Lito Cruz; Juan Palomino; Luis Machín
- Production companies: INCAA and San Luis Cine
- Release date: May 17, 2012 (Buenos Aires)
- Running time: 110 minutes
- Country: Argentina
- Language: Spanish

La Revolución es un sueño eterno (Spanish: The revolution is an eternal dream) is a 2012 Argentine film, based on the eponymous book by Andrés Rivera. It is based on the life of Juan José Castelli, who led the May Revolution and the early steps of the Argentine War of Independence.

The main actor is Lito Cruz as Juan José Castelli. Other actors are Juan Palomino as Bernardo Monteagudo, Luis Machín as Manuel Belgrano, Adrián Navarro as Mariano Moreno and Edward Nulkievwicz as Agrelo.

It is a joint production of INCAA and San Luis Cine. Most of the movie was shot in the San Luis Province, including a stage similar to the 1810 Buenos Aires Cabildo, and the speech of Castelli to the natives of the Upper Peru was filmed at the Sierra de las Quijadas National Park. The scenes of the British invasions of the Río de la Plata were filmed in Luján.

It was filmed in 2007, and the filming took seven weeks.
