= Esperanza mía =

- Genre: Telenovela
- Created by: Adrián Suar
- Written by: Marta Betoldi; Claudio Lacelli; Lily Ann Martin
- Directed by: Sebastián Pivotto; Lucas Gil
- Starring: Mariano Martínez; Mariana Espósito; Ana María Picchio; Carola Reyna; Federico D'Elía; Tomás Fonzi; Ángela Torres; Gabriela Toscano; Rita Cortese; Natalie Pérez; Franco Masini
- Theme music composer: Mariana Espósito
- Opening theme: "Tengo Esperanza"
- Country of origin: Argentina
- Original language: Spanish
- No. of seasons: 1
- No. of episodes: 192

Production
- Producer: Pol-ka
- Production location: Buenos Aires
- Running time: 55 minutes

Original release
- Network: Canal 13
- Release: April 6, 2015 – January 14, 2016

Related
- Noche y día; Los ricos no piden permiso

Esperanza mía (Hope of Mine) is a 2015 Argentine telenovela. With script by Lily Ann Martin, Claudio Lacelli and Marta Betoldi and production of Pol-ka, it was shown by Canal 13 between April 6, 2015 and January 14, 2016. For its recording, the producer acquired resolution cameras 4K UHD. It stars Mariano Martínez and Mariana Espósito. It also has the performances of Tomás Fonzi, Ana María Picchio, Carola Reyna, Federico D'Elía, Ángela Torres, Gabriela Toscano, Rita Cortese, Natalie Pérez and Franco Masini. In July 2015, a theatrical adaptation was presented at the Teatro Ópera in Buenos Aires.

== Plot ==
Julia Albarracín (Mariana Espósito) is a twenty-year-old girl who lives in Colonia La Merced, a small town in the province of Buenos Aires, along with Blanca, her adoptive mother. The pollution generated by the plant where Blanca works makes her extremely sick, resulting in her eventual death. Before she dies, she gives her daughter the necessary evidence to prove the responsibility of the factory and therefore, of its owners. When Julia tries to resort to justice, two thugs sent by one of the owners of the company begin to persecute her, so she escapes to Buenos Aires, Argentina to ask for help from an old friend of her mother, Concepción (Ana Maria Picchio). Concepción is the superior mother of the Santa Rosa Convent and decides to pass Julia as a novice and changing her name to "Esperanza", to hide her identity and protect her. The young woman enters the convent, but her arrival generates several conflicts with the rest of the nuns. There she meets Clara Anselmo (Gabriela Toscano), a nun who turns out to be her biological mother.

Tomás Ortiz (Mariano Martínez) is a young priest who returns to Buenos Aires, Argentina, his hometown. Together with his brother Máximo (Tomás Fonzi) owns the factory that Julia tries to denounce. Máximo is the one who is in charge of the company and is aware of the contamination complaints. He is engaged to Eva Monti (Natalie Pérez), his brother's ex girlfriend. Tomás begins to help Santa Rosa Convent, which leads him to establish a very special bond with Esperanza. Both begin to fall in love, but his religious vocation and her supposed novice role make them live a forbidden romance.

== Production ==
The production was halted on April 18, 2015, because of a labor strike of all Argentine actors, decided by theAsociación Argentina de Actores. Producer Adrián Suar criticized it, as the program had an expensive location shooting prepared for that day. The telenovela will have cameos of other actors. Valeria Lynch played a "rocker" nun, who became friend with Esperanza. Jimena Barón, Esperanza's cousin and best advisor, who composes commercial jingles. She joined the cast during a controversial break up with soccer player Daniel Osvaldo. She was planning by then to move to Europe, but eventually gave up those plans and stayed in Argentina. As a result, she asked to join the cast again.

== Reception ==
As Lali Esposito has a big fanbase, the program was presented with a show in La Plata. It included a show by Luciano Pereyra, the author of a production theme. The show soon became a trending topic on Twitter.

El Trece had good ratings in the prime time in 2015, thanks to the Turkish telenovela Binbir Gece (translated in Argentina as "Las mil y una noches"). Esperanza mía kept important ratings as well.

Federico Kunz, a priest from the San Luis province, started an online petition asking for the removal of the program. He considers that the story of a romantic love between a priest and a fake nun is insulting for religious people. As the main characters would eventually kiss at some point, he considers that it would be insulting to clerical celibacy as well. The petition started on March 9, and have more than 5,000 supporters. The TV channel El Trece is not concerned about the petition, and kept producing new episodes.

== Other media ==
Mariano Martínez reported in a radio interview that there are projects to make a theater adaption of the telenovela, during the 2015 winter season.

The actresses of the telenovela appeared in the first program of Showmatch in 2015, characterized as the monks, and made a musical show. They made similar musicals in the program afterwards.

=== International releases ===
The series was released in Chile in December 2016 by Chilevision. Although the original series is in Spanish, it was dubbed by local actors. This proved to be controversial among the Chilean audiences, so Chilevision clarified that the intention was to remove the Argentine local slang, as the jokes may be otherwise difficult to be understood by non-Argentine audiences. This dubbing was criticized because the voices got out of synch with the action, and because the lead voice actress would lack the humorous tone of Lali Espósito.

== Cast ==
- Mariano Martínez as Tomás Ortiz
- Mariana Espósito as Julia Albarracín / Esperanza / Esperanza Julia Correa Anselmo de Ortiz
- Gabriela Toscano as Clara Anselmo de Correa
- Federico D'Elía as Jorge Correa
- Tomás Fonzi as Máximo Ortiz
- Ángela Torres as Lola Fiore
- Jimena Barón as Gilda Albarracín
- Stefano de Gregorio as Federico Minelli
- Michel Noher as Nicolás Aguilera
- Paula Chaves as Paula Gatica
- Alejandro Fiore as Germán Pereyra
- Alberto Fernández de Rosa as Bishop Marcucci
- Diego Martín Vásquez as Tinieblo
- Ana Maria Picchio as Madre Concepción
- Carola Reyna as Sor Beatriz
- Leticia Siciliani as Sor Nieves
- Valeria Lynch as Sor Celeste
- Mónica Cabrera as Juana
- Luciano Pereyra as Joaquín
- Manuel Ramos as Santiago
- Natalie Pérez as Eva Monti de Ortiz
- Franco Masini as Pedro Correa
- Federico Barga as Óscar "Osqui" Fiore
- Pedro Alfonso as Esteban "Gato" Méndez
- Mercedes Funes as Leticia Sosa
- Minerva Casero as Dominga Contreras
- Abril Sánchez as Julieta Arrain
- Bárbara Vélez as Milagros "Mili" del Pombo
- Lucas Velasco as Ángel "Monito" Marrapodi
- José María Listorti as Toty Garibaldi
- Rita Cortese as Sor Genoveva
- Karina K as Sor María
- Laura Cymer as Sor Diana
- Gipsy Bonafina as Sor Suplicio
- Vanesa Butera as Sor Carmela
- Florencia Ortiz as Alicia
- Margarita Molfino as Corina
- Virginia Kaufmann as Pilar
- Camila Mateos as Valentina
- Lucía Pecrul as Mercedes
- Malena Luchetti as Pato
- Eliseo Barrionuevo as Miguel
- Alejandra Majluf as Débora
- Paula Brasca as Cynthia
- Alejandro Botto as Sergio
- Belén Pasqualini as Emilia
- Andrea Garrote as Graciela
- Anita Gutiérrez as Inés
- Sabrina Rojas as Faustina
- Santiago Vázquez as Juanjo
- Carlos Kaspar as Fortunato
- Nicolás Riedel as Student of the Santa Rosa Convent

== Awards ==
- 2015 Martín Fierro Awards
  - Best daily fiction
  - Best new actress (Leticia Siciliani)

== Release history ==
List of release dates, distributor and reference
Region	Channel	Title	Date	Ref.
Argentina	El Trece	Esperanza mía	April 6, 2015	
Paraguay	Unicanal	Esperanza mía	April 6, 2015	
Uruguay	Teledoce	Esperanza mía	August 10, 2015	
Indonesia	FMN Channel	My Lovely Hope	October 19, 2015	
Israel	Arutz HaYeladim	התקווה שלי	November 1, 2015	
Israel	Viva	התקווה שלי	November 25, 2015	
Slovenia	Planet TV	Esperanza	November 30, 2015	
España	Nova	Esperanza mía	December 14, 2015	
Bolivia	Red ATB	Esperanza mía	January 11, 2016	
Hungary	RTL Klub	Isten áldjon, Esperanza!	February 16, 2016	
Poland	TV4	Moja Nadzieja	February 23, 2016	
Ecuador	GamaTV	Esperanza mía	April 12, 2016	
Latin America	MTV	Esperanza mía	November 14, 2016	
Chile	CHV	Esperanza mía	December 12, 2016	
Panama	TVN	Esperanza mía	TBA	
