= Leticia Siciliani =

Argentine actress (born 1992)

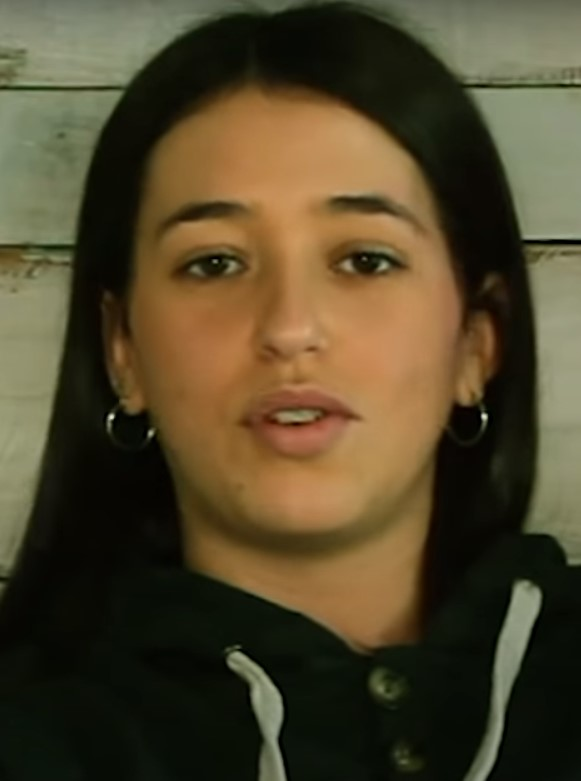
- Siciliani in 2019
- Born: 18 July 1992 (age 33); Buenos Aires, Argentina
- Occupation: Actress
- Years active: 2014–present
- Relatives: Griselda Siciliani (sister)

Leticia Siciliani (born 18 July 1992) is an Argentine actress. She is best known for playing Nieves in the telenovela Esperanza mía (2015–2016) and Carmen in 100 días para enamorarse (2018).

== Beginnings ==
From an early age, she took acting classes with Hugo Midón. She also took singing lessons and musical comedy classes.

Her first casting was for the successful juvenile series Patito feo, where she reached the final phase, but was not selected.

== Acting career ==
Siciliani began her acting career in 2014, in the Pol-Ka series Mis amigos de siempre with the character of "Sol", a soccer player. In real life, Siciliani was a member of the Excursionistas Club.

In the same year, she made her debut in theater with the play Amnesia.

In 2015, she made the leap to fame after playing Nieves in the series Esperanza mía participating in the soundtrack and the theatrical version. This role gave her a Martín Fierro prize in the revelation category.

In 2016, she made her film debut the film El hilo rojo starring China Suárez, Benjamin Vicuña and Guillermina Valdez.

She currently takes part in the Argentine reality show Masterchef Celebrity.

== Personal life ==
She is the younger sister of the actress Griselda Siciliani.

She lived with her partner Delfina Martínez, whom she met playing football. Siciliani proposed to her in 2017. They are not together anymore.

== Filmography ==
=== Film ===
Year	Title	Role	Notes
2016	El hilo rojo	Sofía	
2018	Eso que nos enamora	Romina	

=== Television ===
Year	Title	Role	Notes
2014	Mis amigos de siempre	Sol	
2015–2016	Esperanza mía	Nieves	
2015	Fans en vivo	Ella Misma/Invitada	
2018	100 días para enamorarse	Carmen	
2020	MasterChef Celebrity Argentina	Herself	

=== Theatre ===
Year	Title	Role	Venue	Ref.
2014	Amnesia			
2015	Esperanza mía, el musical			
2015	Esperanza mía, en el Luna Park			
2018–2020	Salvajes		Teatro Metropolitan Sura	

== Radio ==
Year	Title	Role	Radio
2017	¿Qué hicimos para merecer esto?		Radio y Punto

== Awards ==
Ceremony	Year	Nominated work	Category	Result	Ref.
Martín Fierro Awards	2016	Esperanza mía	Revelación	Won	
