= La dueña (Argentine TV series) =

- From left to right: Félix Fernández (Benjamín Vicuña), Sofía Ponte (Mirtha Legrand) and Amparo Lacroix (Florencia Bertotti)
- Genre: Miniseries
- Created by: Martín Kweller; Nacho Viale
- Written by: Marcelo Camaño
- Directed by: Diego Palacio; Mariano Ardanaz; Jesus Braceras
- Starring: Mirtha Legrand; Florencia Bertotti; Benjamín Vicuña
- Opening theme: Es la dueña
- Composer: Abel Pintos
- Country of origin: Argentina
- Original language: Spanish

Production
- Executive producer: Vanessa Tevez
- Producer: Endemol

Original release
- Release: April 18, 2012

La Dueña (English: The Chairwoman) is a 2012 Argentine miniseries. It is a blockbuster starring Mirtha Legrand, who worked on this series after 46 years of retirement from acting in television.

== Plot ==
Sofía Ponte is a successful businesswoman, heading an important cosmetics firm. She does not trust her sons and heirs, and organizes a plot to see which of them are trustworthy. Her granddaughter Amparo loses her parents in a plane accident, and begins a romance with Félix, the son of the pilot. Félix takes a job at the firm, and secretly investigates the plane crash, suspecting that it was not an accident.

== Cast ==
- Mirtha Legrand as Sofía Ponte de Lacroix
- Florencia Bertotti as Amparo Lacroix
- Benjamín Vicuña as Esteban Salerno/Félix Fernández
- Raúl Taibo as Juan Lacroix Ponte
- Juan Gil Navarro as Federico Lacroix Ponte
- Fabián Vena as Diego Lacroix Ponte
- Claudia Lapacó as Teresa Fernández
- Federico D'Elía as Hernán Verges
- Andrea Frigerio as Lourdes Rivero de Lacroix
- Juan Pedro Lanzani as Eliseo Lacroix Rivero
- Brenda Gandini as Delfina Lacroix Rivero
- Carlos Portaluppi as Sergio Matienzo
- Jorgelina Aruzzi as Daniela Pereyra Rossi
- Manuela Pal as Magdalena "Maggy" Rodríguez Costa
- Alfredo Casero as Oliverio Carranza
- Mónica Cabrera as Helena Rossi
- Jorge D'Elía as Martín Braun
- Dolores Sarmiento as Mariela Echegoyen
- Daniela Aita as Nina Marini
- Graciela Dufau as Una amiga de Sofía
- Juan Ignacio Machado as Un matón
- Nacha Guevara as Carmen Salguero Solar
- Enrique Pinti as Dante Olivos Peña
- Daniel Rabinovich as Salvador Santos
- Juana Viale as Cecilia Peralta Ramos
- Sebastián Estevanez as Marcos Guerrero
- Héctor Giovine as Milton Lacroix
- Enrique Liporace as Renzo Pereyra Lucena
- Julia Calvo as La Cura
- Veronica Mertel as Valeria Kantz

== Production ==
Mirtha Legrand began her career as a successful actress, and retired in 1965. She began to work as a TV host, in Almorzando con Mirtha Legrand (English: Having a dinner with Mirtha Legrand), a talk show themed as a dinner, which lasted for several years. Her last previous acting work was in a stage play in 1990; she had not appeared on television as an actress for 46 years. La Dueña was scripted by Nacho Viale, grandson of Mirtha Legrand. She did not like the idea of acting at first, because of her age, but soon reconsidered and accepted. The original proposed name was "La Doña" ("Doña" is the Spanish female form of the honorific title "Don"), and the main character was scripted as the president of a news agency. The producer Martín Kweller proposed the changes to the name used and the cosmetics firm.

The cast of the miniseries features several of the most important actors of Argentina.

The program was initially scheduled to run on Sundays at 22:00 on Telefe, competing with the investigative journalism television program Periodismo para todos (English: Journalism for all) on channel 13. However, it was finally scheduled for Wednesdays at 22:30, competing with Bailando 2012 (English: Dancing 2012). The premiere achieved almost 30.9 rating points.

== Reception ==
The miniseries was praised by La Nación for the scripts and the production. The shooting, the locations, the cast and the editing have good quality. Although the point of main interest for the audience is Legrand's acting, the miniseries does not rely solely on her.

The newspaper also criticised the use of outdated cliches at certain points in the plot, the presence of a comic relief character in a dramatic work, and the excessive use of metafictional allusions to Mirtha Legrand herself in the Sofía Conte character.
