= El puntero =

- From left to right: Lombardo (Rodrigo de la Serna), El Gitano (Julio Chávez), Clarita (Gabriela Toscano) and Levante (Luis Luque)
- Genre: Political drama
- Created by: Adrián Suar
- Written by: Mario Segade
- Directed by: Daniel Barone
- Starring: Julio Chávez; Gabriela Toscano
- Theme music composer: Bomba estéreo
- Opening theme: Fuego
- Country of origin: Argentina
- Original language: Spanish
- No. of seasons: 1
- No. of episodes: 39

Original release
- Network: El Trece
- Release: May 15 – December 28, 2011

El Puntero is a 2011 Argentine miniseries, produced by Pol-Ka and starred by Julio Chávez and Gabriela Toscano. "Puntero" is a word from Argentine slang for a man who works as an intermediate between poor people and political parties, in a clientelist relation (that is, a political broker). The miniseries received the Golden Martín Fierro Award.

== Production ==
El puntero is a political drama set in an Argentine Villa miseria. It is produced by Pol-Ka for the TV channel El Trece. Although El Trece is part of the Grupo Clarín, which had several conflicts with the government of Cristina Kirchner, the lead actor Julio Chávez clarified that the tone of the miniseries is generic, and not a criticism of the Kirchner's administration. In fact, he conditioned his work in the program on the absence of specific political bias. Chávez did not even know about political clientelism, and investigated about the topic before accepting to work in the program.

The opening of the program uses the song "Fuego" by Bomba Estéreo, and mixes images of the history of Argentina with images of Chávez characterized as a political puntero. For this purpose he grew his sideburns, used hair extensions, 1970s shirts and chains.

The program did not have a fixed filming set, and filmed scenes at several real villa miserias.

== Plot ==
The miniseries is set in a Villa miseria in Greater Buenos Aires, ruled by mayor Iñíguez since 1987. Pablo Aldo Perotti, known as the "Gitano", works in the clientelist relation between the poor people and the political authorities. Perotti wants to be the new mayor, and to return with his former wife Clarita.

At the end of the miniseries, Clarita becomes the new mayor, and Perotti ends up in a psychiatric institution

== Reception ==
The program won the 2011 Martín Fierro Awards for best miniseries actor (Julio Chávez) and best miniseries. They received as well the Golden Martín Fierro Award.

== Cast ==
- Julio Chávez as Pablo Aldo Gitano Perotti
- Gabriela Toscano as Clarita
- Luis Luque as Levan Levante Ufaloff
- Rodrigo de la Serna as José María Lombardo
- María Rosa Fugazot as Antonia
- Carlos Moreno as Hugo Iñíguez
- Belén Blanco as Libertad
- Pablo Brichta as Leme Ufaloff
- Joaquín Flamini as Francisquito
- Fernando Locatelli as Loiro
- Bárbara Lombardo as La Pochi
- Claudio Rissi as Filpi
- Ariel Staltari as Luis Calda
- Nahuel Pérez Biscayart as Herminio
