= Gabriela Toscano =

Uruguayan actress (born 1965)

- Born: 25 October 1965 (age 59); Montevideo, Uruguay
- Occupation: actress
- Years active: 1973-present
- Partner: Carlos Rivas (1992-present)
- Children: Bruno Rivas (b. 1995)

Gabriela Rosana Toscano (born October 25, 1965, in Montevideo, Uruguay) is an Uruguayan actress who works in Argentina.

== Biography ==
Gabriela Toscano was born in Montevideo, Uruguay, on October 25, 1965. She moved to Buenos Aires, Argentina, at an early age. She took part in "Música en Libertad Infantil" at the age of 4. She worked in TV series such as Cumbres borrascosas, Rosa de lejos, Coraje mamá, Alta Comedia, Los chicos crecen, Situación límite, Los machos, Gasoleros, Culpables, 1/2 Falta, Amas de casa desesperadas, Mujeres asesinas, Para vestir santos, El puntero, Esperanza mía and Quiero vivir a tu lado; and films such as El exilio de Gardel, El buen destino and Las viudas de los jueves. She got her first Martín Fierro award in 2001 for her work in Culpables, and a second one in 2011 for her work in Para vestir santos; during that year she worked in El puntero.

== Works ==
=== Television ===
- Quiero vivir a tu lado (2017)
- Esperanza mía (2015)
- El puntero (2011)
- Para vestir santos (2010)
- Variaciones (2008)
- Mujeres Asesinas (2007)
- Amas de casa desesperadas (2006)
- 1/2 falta (2005)
- Son amores (2002-2003)
- Culpables (2001)
- Primicias (2000)
- Como vos & yo (1998)
- Gasoleros (1998)
- De Corazón (1997)
- Los Machos (1994)
- Apasionada (1993)
- Cuando vuelvas a mí (1986)
- Un mundo de muñeca (1986)
- Coraje mamá (1985)
- Alguien como usted (1984)
- El solitario (1980)
- Rosa de lejos (1980)
- Daniel y Cecilia (1980)
- Novia de vacaciones (1979)
- Una escalera al cielo (1979)
- Jacinta Pichimahuida (1974)

=== Film ===
- Las viudas de los jueves (2009)
- El Buen destino (2005)
- No quiero volver a casa (2001)
- Atracción Satánica (1990)
- Guerreras y Cautivas (1989)
- Sur (1988)
- Debajo del mundo (1987)
- El exilio de Gardel (1985)
- Los Viernes de la eternidad (1981)
- Las Aventuras de Pikín (1977)
- Jacinta Pichimauida se enamora (1977)
- Los cuatro secretos (1976)
- Los chicos crecen (1976)
- El sexo y el amor (1974)
- La Mary (1974)
- Luces de mis zapatos (1973)

=== Theater ===
- Love, Love, Love (2013)
- Hamlet, la metamorfosis (2011-2012)
- Como aprendí a Manejar (2008)
- La Duda (2006-2007)
- La Prueba (2004)
- Los pequeños burgueses de gorki (2000)
- Monologos de la vagina (2000-2001)
- Rompiendo códigos
- La gaviota
- Madera de reyes
- Diosas en el aire

== Awards ==
- Martín Fierro as lead actress in miniseries (for Para vestir santos) (2001)
- Cóndor de Plata as secondary actress (for las viudas de los jueves) (2010)
- Martín Fierro as lead actress in miniseries (for Culpables) (2001)
