= Las Aventuras de Pikín =

- Directed by: Alberto David Abdala
- Written by: Alberto David Abdala; Jorge Falcón
- Produced by: Alberto David Abdala
- Starring: Rey Charol; Jorge Barreiro
- Cinematography: Américo Hoss
- Edited by: Remo Charbonello
- Release date: 21 July 1977
- Running time: 67 minutes
- Country: Argentina
- Language: Spanish

Las Aventuras de Pikín is a 1977 Argentine family adventure film directed and written by Alberto Abdala with Jorge Falcón. The cinematography was performed by Américo Hoss.

== Cast ==
- Jorge Barreiro
- Horacio Bruno
- Osvaldo María Cabrera
- Rey Charol
- Rolando Chávez
- Cristina Del Valle
- Coco Fossati
- Vicente La Russa
- Marcelo Marcote
- Reynaldo Mompel
- Arturo Noal
- Raúl Ricutti
- Mario Savino
- Oscar Viale
