= Hugo Arana =

Argentine actor (1943–2020)

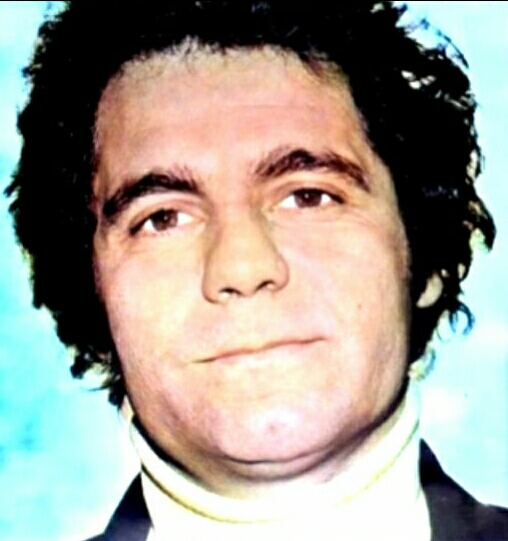
- Born: Ricardo Hugo Arana; July 23, 1943
- Died: 11 October 2020 (aged 77)
- Occupation: Film actor
- Spouse: Marzenka Novak

Hugo Arana (23 July 1943 – 11 October 2020) was an Argentine film, television, and theatre actor.

== Life ==
Arana was born on 23 July 1943. He grew up in Monte Grande where his parents were farmers and moved with his family to Lomas de Zamora and then Lanús. He studied acting with Marcello Lavalle and Augusto Fernandes.

In his first years as an actor, he was part of a theatre group called "Errare Humanum Est" and he acted in films such as El Santo de la Espada (1970) and La tregua (1974).

In the 1980s, he became popular for his part in an advertisement for Crespi wine, and then for his part in the TV sitcom Matrimonios y algo más, created by Hugo Moser, in which he played two characters who were highly acclaimed by the public: the "Groncho" (in the comedy sketch "El Groncho y La Dama" (The Shabby Man and the Lady)) and Huguito Araña (a stereotypically feminine gay man).

He worked on the Telefé TV series Los exitosos Pells, where he played the director of the fictitious channel "Mega News", Franco Andrada.

== Illness and death ==
After suffering a hard fall, Arana was hospitalized and subsequently tested positive for COVID-19 during the COVID-19 pandemic in Argentina. Arana died of the disease on 11 October 2020, at the age of 77.

== Filmography ==
Movies
| Year | Title | Character |
|---|---|---|
| 1970 | El santo de la espada | |
| 1974 | Los golpes bajos | |
| 1974 | La Vuelta de Martín Fierro | |
| 1974 | La balada del regreso | |
| 1974 | Dale nomás | |
| 1974 | La Madre María | |
| 1974 | La tregua | |
| 1975 | Los días que me diste | |
| 1977 | El soltero | |
| 1979 | No apto para menores | |
| 1979 | ...Y mañana serán hombres | Oliva |
| 1979 | La isla | |
| 1979 | Este loco amor loco | |
| 1980 | Buenos Aires, la tercera fundación | Narrator |
| 1982 | Volver | Ángel Ragucci |
| 1985 | The Official Story | Enrique Ibáñez |
| 1986 | Vivir a los 17 | Andrea's Father |
| 1987 | Made in Argentina | |
| 1987 | Chorros | Traverso |
| 1988 | Las puertitas del Sr. López | |
| 1991 | Un lugar en el mundo | Zamora |
| 1992 | El lado oscuro del corazón | (Very minor role) |
| 1995 | El verso | |
| 1997 | El Che | |
| 1997 | Noche de ronda | |
| 1997 | Queréme así (piantao) | |
| 1998 | El inquietante caso de José Blum | José Blum |
| 1999 | Dibu 2, la venganza de Nasty | Lencinas |
| 1999 | Caminata espacial | |
| 2002 | Mi suegra es un zombie | |
| 2003 | Tus ojos brillaban | Heriberto |
| 2003 | El viaje hacia el mar | Rodríguez |
| 2003 | Cautiva | Judge Barrenechea |
| 2004 | Peligrosa obsesión | el Brujo |
| 2008 | Chile puede | |
| 2008 | Don't Look Down | |
| 2014 | Death in Buenos Aires | Sanfilippo |
| 2020 | The Funeral Home | Salvador |

Television
| Year | Title | Character |
|---|---|---|
| 1982–1988 | Matrimonios y algo más | |
| 1997–2003 | 5 Amigos | |
| 1999 | Buenos vecinos | |
| 2003 | Resistiré | |
| 2004 | La panadería de los Felipe | |
| 2007 | Hechizada | |
| 2007 | El Capo | |
| 2008–2009 | Los exitosos Pells | |
| 2009 | Hogar, dulce hogar | Rolando |
| 2010 | Para vestir santos | 2013 "Los Vecinos en Guerra" |
| 2016 | La Leona | |

== Awards and nominations ==
| Year | Award | Category | Movie/TV Show | Result |
|---|---|---|---|---|
| 2003 | Festival de Cine Iberoamericano de Huelva | Best Actor | El viaje hacia el mar | Winner |
| 2005 | Cóndor de Plata | Best Supporting Actor | Cautiva | Winner |
| 2008 | Martín Fierro | Supporting Actor/Comedy | | Nominated |
