= Para vestir santos =

2010 Argentine television miniseries

- Genre: Comedy drama
- Written by: Javier Daulte
- Directed by: Daniel Barone
- Starring: Celeste Cid; Griselda Siciliani; Gabriela Toscano
- Country of origin: Argentina
- Original language: Spanish
- No. of seasons: 1
- No. of episodes: 36

Production
- Executive producer: Diego Andrasnik
- Producer: Adrián Suar
- Cinematography: Guillermo Zappino
- Editors: Alejandro Alem; Alejandro Parysow
- Running time: 44–53 minutes
- Production company: Pol-ka

Original release
- Network: El Trece
- Release: 21 April – 22 December 2010

Para vestir santos is an Argentine comedy-drama television miniseries directed by Daniel Barone, which premiered on El Trece on 21 April 2010 and consists of thirty-six episodes. It stars Celeste Cid as Malena, Griselda Siciliani as Virginia and Gabriela Toscano as Susana, three sisters struggling after their mother's death.

The miniseries received critical acclaim and won nine Martín Fierro Awards, including the Golden Martín Fierro Award.

== Plot ==
Gloria (Betiana Blum) a severe and acid widow dies suddenly. Her three daughters, Susana (Gabriela Toscano), Virginia (Griselda Siciliani) and Malena (Celeste Cid), all single, will verify that the disappearance of their tremendous mother does not imply any release. Their step sister, María Eugenia, the villain of the story, sold the house of their parents upon their mother's death. As if the failure of their lives, especially with men, was marked by some kind of curse.

== Production ==
Para vestir santos features several musical numbers. All the lead actresses had previous experience with the genre. Griselda Siciliani studied dance and sing, worked in the theater musicals Revista Nacional, Sweet Charity and Quiero llenarme de ti, and the television musical Patito Feo. Gabriela Toscano made her first work in a musical. Celeste Cid worked in the musical video "Asesíname" by Charly García, and Gloria Carrá is a musical artist.

The series portrays Celeste Cid's character through the discovery of her sexuality in a lesbian relationship. Although the Argentine television had previously featured homosexual characters in fiction, it was rarely a main character as is in this case. The series was contemporary to the sanction of the same-sex marriage in Argentina.

== Reception ==
The first episode, aired on April 21, 2010, got 19.1 rating points.

The miniseries received the Golden Martín Fierro award, as well as 8 other Martín Fierro awards. It was awarded best miniseries, best script and best direction. Gabriela Toscano, Celeste Cid and Griselda Siciliani were all nominated as best lead actress of miniseries, the award was given to Toscano. Hugo Arana was awarded best secondary actor, being nominated with Fernand Miras and Luis Machin. Betiana Blum was awarded best secondary actress. Ricardo Darín received the award for best guest appearance, nominated along with Gabriel Goity. Martina Gusman was awarded as best new actress, being nominated with Pilar Gamboa. The program had unsuccessful nominations for best theme song and best production.

== Cast ==
=== Main ===
- Gabriela Toscano as Susana San Juan. Daughter of Gloria and sister of Male, Virginia and María Eugenia.
- Celeste Cid as Malena San Juan. Daughter of Gloria and Vicente and sister of Susana and Virginia.
- Griselda Siciliani as Virginia San Juan. Daughter of Gloria and sister of Male, Virginia and María Eugenia.
- Gloria Carrá as María Eugenia. Daughter of Lidia and half sister of Virginia and Susana.
- Betiana Blum as Gloria. Horacio's sister and mother of Susana, Malena and Virginia.
- Hugo Arana as Horacio. Gloria's brother and uncle of Susana, Malena and Virginia.
- Fernán Mirás as Sergio Ríos. Susana's boyfriend.
- Daniel Hendler as Damián Ochoa. Malena's friend.
- Héctor Díaz as Néstor. Father of the son of Virginia.

=== Special Participations ===
- Julieta Díaz as Ema Brossio. Malena's ex-girlfriend.
- Lito Cruz as Vicente. Malena's biological father.
- Luis Machín as Carlos. Susana's ex-boyfriend.
- Alfredo Casero as David. Susana's ex-boyfriend.
- Gabriel Goity as Marcos. Susana's ex-boyfriend.
- Beatriz Spelzini as Lidia. Mother of María Eugenia.
- Martina Gusman as Laura. Malena's ex-girlfriend.
- Paola Barrientos as Carolina. Susana's friend.
- Osmar Núñez as Samy
- Adrián Suar as Himself
- Daniel Barone as Himself
- Ricardo Darín
- Antonio Birabent as Roy. Virginia's ex-boyfriend.
- Leonora Balcarce as Magda. Sebastián's ex-wife.
- Mariano Torre as Matías. Malena's friend.
- Rafael Ferro as Julio. Virginia's boyfriend.
- Guillermo Arengo as Bruno. Susana, Malena and Virginia's neighbor.
- Eugenia Guerty as Gimena. Carlos's ex-wife.
- Esteban Meloni as Sebastián. Malena's ex-boyfriend.
- Pilar Gamboa as Emilia. Malena's girlfriend.
- Horacio Peña as Luis. Ema's father.
- Santiago Magariños as Nacho. Son of María Eugenia.
- Pablo Brichta as El Sordo
- Carlos Bermejo as Alfredo
- Lidia Catalano as Estela
- Mario Moscoso as Pepe
