= Seawards Journey =

2003 film

- Film poster
- Directed by: Guillermo Casanova
- Written by: Guillermo Casanova
- Starring: Hugo Arana
- Release date: 8 August 2003
- Running time: 78 minutes
- Country: Uruguay
- Language: Spanish

Seawards Journey (Spanish: El viaje hacia el mar) is a 2003 Uruguayan drama film directed by Guillermo Casanova. It was selected as the Uruguayan entry for the Best Foreign Language Film at the 76th Academy Awards, but it was not nominated.

== Cast ==
- Hugo Arana as Rodriguez
- Julio César Castro as Siete y Tres Diez
- Julio Calcagno as Quintana
- Diego Delgrossi as Rataplán

== See also ==
- List of submissions to the 76th Academy Awards for Best Foreign Language Film
- List of Uruguayan submissions for the Academy Award for Best International Feature Film
