= Nicolás Repetto (TV host) =

Argentine TV host

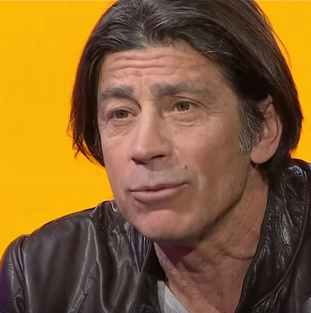
- Repetto in 2019.
- Born: 11 March 1957 (age 68); Mar del Plata, Argentina
- Occupation: Television host
- Years active: 1982-Present
- Spouse(s): Cecilia Fontanarrosa (1978-1983); Reina Reech (1986-1992); Florencia Raggi (2008-Present)
- Children: Nicolás Repetto; Valeria Repetto; Juana Repetto; Francisco Repetto; Renata Repetto

Nicolás Repetto (born March 11, 1957) is an Argentine TV host. He worked in Fax, a talk show that received the Golden Martín Fierro Awards in 1991. He received a second Golden Martín Fierro Award in 2000.
