= Fax (Argentine talk show) =

Fax is an Argentine talk show, hosted by Nicolás Repetto, that aired from 1991 to 1992. It received two Martín Fierro Awards for best host and best production, and the first Golden Martín Fierro Award.
