= César Mascetti =

Argentinian television presenter (1941–2022)

- Born: 9 December 1941; San Pedro, Buenos Aires, Argentina
- Died: 4 October 2022 (aged 80); San Pedro, Buenos Aires, Argentina

César Alberto Mascetti (9 December 1941 – 4 October 2022) was an Argentine journalist and television news host. He worked for Channel 13 starting in 1971 and presented the network's Telenoche program until his retirement in 2003.

== Early life ==
Mascetti was born in San Pedro, Buenos Aires, Argentina, on 9 December 1941. His father, César Sr., headed the San Pedro newspaper El independiente, having succeeded Mascetti's grandfather, Alejandro, who established the paper in 1892. Mascetti studied journalism at the National University of La Plata, before starting his career in his home town.

== Career ==
After working for his family's paper, Mascetti was hired by Clarín in 1965 to work in graphics, and consequently relocated to Buenos Aires. He joined La Razón three years later. He transitioned to television in 1971, when he successfully applied for the position of outdoor reporter with Channel 13.

During his tenure with the network, Mascetti interviewed politicians such as Salvador Allende, Juan Perón, Arturo Umberto Illia, Raúl Alfonsín, Carlos Menem, as well as cultural figures including Jorge Luis Borges, Atahualpa Yupanqui, and Marcel Marceau. He was the first journalist from Argentina to interview a member of the Beatles, when he talked to a naked George Harrison in 1977 on a beach in Rio de Janeiro with Emerson Fittipaldi acting as translator.

Mascetti also reported on the 1972 Uruguayan flight disaster in the Andes, Peron's return to Argentina the following year, the Nicaraguan Revolution and overthrow of Anastasio Somoza Debayle, and the death of Francisco Franco in 1975.

He won his first Martín Fierro award in 1974 for best journalistic work and went on to share 15 more Martín Fierro with fellow correspondents. Mascetti began presenting the Telenoche news program in 1993 with Mónica Cahen D'Anvers, who later became his wife. They both received the Golden Martín Fierro award in 2000 in recognition of their work. After retiring from Telenoche in 2004, they worked together on the radio program Mónica y César on Radio del Plata.

== Personal life ==
Mascetti married Mónica Cahen D'Anvers in June 2003. They first met in 1971 when they were working for El Trece together and were in a domestic partnership in the 25 years prior to their marriage. They remained married until his death. They did not have children together; Cahen D'Anvers had two children from her previous marriage. After retiring from journalism in 2015, he went back to San Pedro and established a rural tourism centre called La Campiña de Mónica y Cesar.

Mascetti died on 4 October 2022 in San Pedro. He was 80, and had bile duct cancer prior to his death.
