= Captive (2003 film) =

- Theatrical release poster
- Directed by: Gastón Biraben
- Screenplay by: Gastón Biraben
- Produced by: Marcelo Altmark; Gastón Biraben; Tammis Chandler; Raúl Alberto Tosso
- Starring: Bárbara Lombardo; Susana Campos; Hugo Arana; Osvaldo Santoro; Noemí Frenkel; Lidia Catalano
- Cinematography: Abel Peñalba; Carlos Torlaschi
- Edited by: Tammis Chandler
- Music by: José Luis Castiñeira de Dios
- Production company: Cacerolazo Producciones
- Distributed by: Primer Plano Film Group
- Release dates: September 2003 (San Sebastián); October 20, 2005 (Argentina)
- Running time: 115 minutes
- Country: Argentina
- Language: Spanish

Captive (Spanish: Cautiva) is a 2003 Argentine film that concerns itself with what happened to the children of the people killed after the 1970s military coup. The film states it was made with the support of Argentine National Institute of Cinema and Audiovisual Arts. Captive was an award winner at the 2003 San Sebastian Film Festival.

== Plot ==
Cristina Quadri is the model of a perfect student. Smart and affluent, her life is in perfect order until, one day, she is called from her class and made to appear in front of a judge. The judge informs her that her biological parents disappeared in the 1970s. Cristina is forced to live with her grandmother, Elisa Dominich. Elisa has spent the past 16 years attempting to locate Cristina, whose birth name was Sofia. Although at first she is hurt, bitter, and confused, Cristina/Sofia eventually grows to care for Elisa and begins to research the fate of her parents, and how much her adoptive parents knew of the truth.

== Context ==
Cautiva is a reflection on both the legacy of the "Dirty War", and the legacy of citizens who were disappeared by the government during the 1970s and 1980s. Once Argentina's current democracy was established, research began on the atrocities committed from 1976-1983 under the military government. It was discovered that children born to disappeared parents while they were in captivity had been routinely adopted by militarily connected families. There were efforts to reconnect these children with their biological relatives. Often this meant any living grandparents or other more removed relatives, as the parents were still disappeared. This proved difficult, which the film illustrates, as Argentina's judicial system had to navigate the most sensitive way to approach a legal situation so entangled with family life and deeply rooted emotions.

== Cast ==
- Bárbara Lombardo as Cristina Quadri / Sofía Lombardi
- Susana Campos as Elisa Dominich
- Hugo Arana as Juez Barrenechea
- Osvaldo Santoro as Pablo Quadri
- Noemí Frenkel as Licenciada Bernstein
- Lidia Catalano as Martha
- Mercedes Funes as Angélica
- Silvia Baylé as Adela de Quadri
- Luis Gianneo as Doctor Gómez

== Reception ==
=== Critical response ===
Film critic A. O. Scott especially lauded the young actor in the film, writing, "We first meet Cristina Quadri, the heroine of Gastón Biraben’s Captive, at her 15th birthday party, in 1994. She appears to be a perfectly ordinary, if exceptionally lovely, Buenos Aires teenager. Cristina lives with her doting upper-middle-class family (her father, now retired, was an officer in the national police force) and attends a starchy Catholic girls’ school, where she daydreams through her lessons and sneaks cigarettes with her best friend. But Bárbara Lombardo, the extraordinary young actress who plays Cristina, has the kind of soft, melancholy features that seem to hold reservoirs of emotion, as if she were haunted by the memory — or perhaps the premonition — of an unbearable hurt."

On the review aggregator website Rotten Tomatoes, 73% of 15 critics' reviews are positive, with an average rating of 6.6/10.

=== Awards ===
==== Wins ====
- Havana Film Festival: OCIC Award - Special Mention - Gaston Biraben; 2003.
- San Sebastián International Film Festival: Horizons Award - Gaston Biraben; 2003.
- Toulouse Latin America Film Festival: FIPRESCI Prize - Gaston Biraben; 2004.
- Argentinean Film Critics Association Awards: Silver Condor - Best Music, José Luis Castiñeira de Dios; Best Supporting Actor, Hugo Arana; 2006.

== See also ==
- The Official Story, a movie related to the "stolen babies" case
- Maria Eugenia Sampallo
- Mothers of the Plaza de Mayo
- Grandmothers of the Plaza de Mayo
- Films depicting Latin American military dictatorships
