= Julio César Castro =

Uruguayan comedian, narrator and actor

Julio César Castro, also known as Juceca (Montevideo, 6 May 1928 – Ib., 11 September 2003) was a Uruguayan comedian, narrator, actor and dramatist. He was mainly known by his character Don Verídico, with which he developed a particular type of absurd humour tied to the rural world.

His stories were also made famous in Argentina, thanks to the humorist Luis Landriscina.

== Works ==
- Los cuentos de Don Verídico, Editorial Arca, 1972.
- La vuelta de Don Verídico, Editorial Arca, 1977.
- Entretanto cuento (30th anniversary of Don Verídico, unpublished stories), Editorial Arca 1992.
- Don Verídico, Editorial Arca 1994.
- Don Verídico: Antología, Ediciones de la Banda Oriental, 1995.
- Los cuentos de Don Verídico, Archivo General de la Nación, Centro de Difusión del Libro, 1997. -Buenos Aires-
- Don Verídico se la cuenta, Editorial de la Flor, 1975.
- Más cuentos de Don Verídico, Editorial Neo Gráfica, 1982.
- Don Verídico: Recopilación, Editorial Imaginador, 1996.
- Nadie entiende nada
- Seawards Journey (2003)
- Hay Barullo en el Resorte, 2005, posthumous work with unpublished stories.
- Fofeto Fulero
- El Resorte está de fiesta
