= Culpables =

- Genre: Drama
- Created by: Adrián Suar
- Written by: Juan José Campanella; Fernando Castets
- Directed by: Daniel Barone
- Starring: Mercedes Morán; Diego Peretti; Alfredo Casero; Gabriela Toscano; Fernán Mirás; Soledad Villamil; Susú Pecoraro
- Theme music composer: Los Abuelos de la Nada
- Opening theme: Costumbres Argentinas
- Country of origin: Argentina
- Original language: Spanish
- No. of seasons: 1
- No. of episodes: 39

Production
- Producer: Pol-Ka

Original release
- Network: El Trece
- Release: April 3 – December 25, 2001

Culpables is a 2001 Argentine miniseries, produced by Pol-Ka and aired by El Trece. It starred by Mercedes Morán, Diego Peretti, Alfredo Casero, Gabriela Toscano, Fernán Mirás, Soledad Villamil and Susú Pecoraro. It received the Golden Martín Fierro award.

== Production ==
The miniseries was aimed to young adults, as previous productions by Pol-Ka such as Vulnerables and Verdad / Consecuencia. It was produced at a time when TV miniseries were being displaced by reality shows.

This miniseries was the first notable work in television by the actor Diego Peretti. He had worked previously in Poliladron, Rodolfo Rojas D.T. and Campeones, but as a secondary actor. It was also the first time that he did not play a character with a tic or a disability.

== Plot ==
The miniseries is focused in a group of friends and their couples. Anibal and Daniela have two sons, and face a romantic crisis. Claudio and Adriana have no sons, and Claudio is unemployed. Perla, just divorced from an abusive husband, is married with Willy and has a lesbian daughter, Sofía. Chechu is a bachelor woman.

== Reception ==
The miniseries received the Golden Martín Fierro award in 2001. It received as well other Martín Fierro awards: best miniseries, best lead actor of miniseries (Diego Peretti), best actress of miniseries (Gabriela Toscano), and best script. Alfredo Casero and Mercedes Morán had also been nominated as best actor and actress of miniseries. The program was nominated for best child actor (Nazareno Casero) and best director, but did not receive those awards.

== Cast ==
- Mercedes Morán as Chechu
- Diego Peretti as Claudio
- Alfredo Casero as Aníbal
- Gabriela Toscano as Daniela
- Fernán Mirás as Willy
- Soledad Villamil as Adriana
- Susú Pecoraro as Perla
- Florencia Bertotti as Sofía
- Gloria Carrá as Romina
