= Mónica Cabrera =

Argentinian writer and actor

- Born: 26 April 1958 (age 68); Buenos Aires, Argentina
- Occupations: Actress, theater director, playwright
- Awards: Konex Award (2011)
- Website: www.monicacabrera.com.ar

Mónica Cabrera (born 26 April 1958) is an Argentine director, playwright, and actress of film, television, and theater. Among other films, she has appeared in Son of the Bride (2001), Lost Embrace (2004), and El infinito sin estrellas (2007). On television she acted in Tratame bien (2009), Malparida (2010), and La dueña (2012).

She has also been recognized for her work in one-person theater that she writes herself. In 2009, she published the book Arrabalera, mujeres que trabajan y otros unipersonales, and in 2010 she produced the Cabrera Marathon, which consisted of releasing a one-person show from her book each month from February to June. As part of the marathon she starred in El sistema de la víctima, Arrabalera, mujeres que trabajan, The victory to la Madrecita (together with Teresa Murias), Limosna de amores, and ¡Dolly Guzmán no está muerta! For her work, she won the 2011 Konex Award for the one-person theater of the decade, and Arrabalera, mujeres que trabajan was nominated for the ACE Awards.

== Biography ==
Mónica Cabrera was born in Buenos Aires on 26 April 1958. In her early years, she was active in the Communist Youth Federation, which led her to direct for the first time in a fundraising project. She studied theater with Alejandra Boero for ten years and then taught at her school, Andamio 90. Later, she founded the Merlo Municipal School of Theater, which she directed until 2000, when her contract was suspended, something she described as "a disgrace" and which caused her economic problems.

She entered cinema in 2001, with the role of Carmen in Juan José Campanella's film Son of the Bride, which was nominated for the Academy Award for Best Foreign Language Film. She later had supporting roles in the films Lost Embrace (2004), A los ojos de Dios (2005), El infinito sin estrellas (2007), and Clarisa ya tiene un muerto (2008).

Her greatest recognition, however, came from supporting roles on television. She played Rosa in Tratame bien (2009), Mabel in the telenovela Malparida (2010), and Elena in La dueña (2012), a series starring Mirtha Legrand. Her performance as Mabel in Malparida earned her a Martín Fierro Award nomination in the Best Supporting Actress category. In 2011 she also played Carmen in the episode "La primera vez y la única" of the series Historias de la primera vez, and Flora as a guest star on Los únicos.

In theater, she usually worked alone; according to Cabrera she got used "to managing alone". Regarding her departure from the Merlo Municipal School of Theater, the actress said "I got involved in a small job; I reduced myself to the essentials," and said that she had to "write, act, and direct alone" because "I had the prejudice of an excess of narcissism and exhibitionism." In 2000 she premiered her first one-person show, El club de las bataclanas, written and performed by her. In 2009 she published the book Arrabalera, mujeres que trabajan y otros unipersonales containing several of her works. She directed The Cabrera's Company, and in 2010 she held the Cabrera Marathon, which lasted from February to June and consisted of releasing a one-person show each month. As part of the marathon she starred in El sistema de la víctima, Arrabalera, mujeres que trabajan, The victory to la Madrecita (together with Teresa Murias), Limosna de amores, and ¡Dolly Guzmán no está muerta! She also appeared in the play Anfitrión Cabaret at the Teatro Anfitrión with Noralih Gago. With Arrabalera, mujeres que trabajan she won the Unipersonal Marathon of the International Festival of Buenos Aires, and in 2008 she participated in the International Festival of Political Cabaret of Mexico with El sistema de víctima. In addition, her work in Arrabalera earned her an ACE Award nomination, and in 2011 won her the Konex Award for one-person show.

In 2009, in an interview for the newspaper La Nación, Cabrera described her work on television as "a scholarship thing" and said "[television] does not change me much." She expressed her preference for the theater and said "In the mass media, it is not about my output and I am called on only to interpret, while in the theater I generate the project, I call the team. It's like a child [...] I feel comfortable." Finally, she concluded that in performance it is necessary "to be of low profile and not to believe anything" and "to be faithful."

== Selected filmography ==
=== Film ===
- Son of the Bride (2001)
- Lost Embrace (2004)
- A los ojos de Dios (2005)
- A Year Without Love (2005)
- The Hands (2006)
- El niño de barro (2007)
- El infinito sin estrellas (2007)
- Clarisa ya tiene un muerto (2008)
- El notificador (2010)

=== Television ===
Year(s)	Title	Role
2009	Tratame bien	Rosa
2010–2011	Malparida	Mabel Díaz
2011	Historias de la primera vez	Carmen
2012	La dueña	Helena Rossi
2013	Historias de corazón	
2014	Somos familia	Ramona Insaurralde
2015–2016	Esperanza mía	Juana
