= Luis Machín =

Argentine actor (born 1968)

- Born: Luis Alfonso Manuel Machín; April 10, 1968 (age 58); Rosario, Santa Fe, Argentina
- Occupation: Actor
- Years active: 1996–present
- Spouse: Gilda Scarpetta (2005–present)

Luis Alfonso Manuel Machín (born April 10, 1968 in Rosario, Santa Fe, Argentina), better known as Luis Machín, is an Argentine theater, film and television actor. He is one of the most respected actors in the Argentine artistic medium and his extensive career includes many works in film, theater and television.

== Biography ==
He was born in Rosario, Santa Fe, Argentina. At 16, Luis Machín decided that he wanted to be an actor. He began studying acting in the theater workshops taught in the secondary school to which he belonged, Manuel Belgrano Commercial of the city of Rosario, attending courses taught by the actor and theater director Miguel Franchi. He continues studying at the Rosarino Center for Theater Research directed by Pepe Costa, where he carries out a large number of works. In 1986 he began studying at the National School of Theater of Rosario that opened that same year and from which he graduated in 1989 in the first promotion. In 1993, at 24 years old, he went to the city of Buenos Aires, Argentina, with the aim of settling in this city and expanding his horizons as an artist. Contact the theatrical Sportivo directed by Ricardo Bartís and begins to develop in it. At the same time he takes acting courses with Alberto Ure in Canal 13.

== Career ==
He is founder, along with other career partners, of the "Agrupación Filodramática Te quisimos con locura" group with which performs a large number of works, among which stand out Bip- du- bup, La importancia de llamarse Ernesto by Oscar Wilde and Noche de reyes by William Shakespeare. At the same time, he participates in different theater groups in the city such as Centro de Actores by Félix Reinoso, the group Arteón by Néstor Zapata and the group Sauco de Carlos Schwaderer being with the latter with which he made his first international tour in different cities of Spain in 1991 with the show of puppets and actors for adults Cabaretit. Together with the Arteón group and the work Malvinas, canto al sentimiento de un pueblo make a long tour of Venezuela. With El pecado que no se puede nombrar and Ricardo Bartís direction he toured Spain, France, Canada, Brazil, Belgium and Germany participating in the most prestigious international festivals such as Avignon, the autumn of Paris and of the Autumn of Madrid as well as the Kunsten of Belgium and the Theater of Welt of Germany. Then premieres on the Teatro San Martín works like Casa de muñecas by Henrik Ibsen, Lo que va dictando el sueño by Griselda Gambaro, in the circuito alternativo Varios pares de pies sobre piso de mármol work that is taken to Barcelona to an encounter with Harold Pinter, Cercano oriente with Alejandro Catalán, Teatro proletario de cámara in the Sportivo teatral, in the Centro Cultural Recoleta Dios perro and in the Teatro Payro Ella, by Susana Torres Molina. In the Theater The cube premiered Los padres terribles by Jean Cocteau and he comes back to Sportivo Teatral where it premieres La pesca, again with Ricardo Bartís. In 2011 with the direction of Cristina Banegas the only work written by Alberto Ure, La familia argentina and in 2012 with the direction of Daniel Veronese premieres in Argentina and for the commercial circuit La última sesión de Freud by Mark St. Germain.

== Filmography ==
=== Television ===
Year	Title	Character	Channel	Notes
1996	Amor sagrado	Dr. Cordero	Telefe	
1997	Chiquititas	Dr. Mandel	Telefe	
1999	Vulnerables		Canal 13	
1999	Campeones de la vida		Canal 13	
2000	Tiempo final	ex-con	Telefe	Episode: "La última cena"
2000	Ilusiones	Dr. Samuel Presas	Canal 13	
2001	Cuatro amigas		Canal 13	
2002	Son amores	Belucci	Canal 13	
2002	Tumberos	President	América TV	
2002	Los simuladores	Romagnoli	Telefe	Episode: "Seguro de desempleo"
2004	Padre Coraje	Dr. Froilán Ponce	Canal 13	
2004	Epitafios	Santiago Peñalver	HBO	
2005	Botines	Lito	Canal 13	
2005	Mujeres asesinas	Eduardo	Canal 13	Episode: "Clara, la fantasiosa"
2005	Criminal	Roca	Canal 9	
2005	Algo habrán hecho por la historia argentina	Manuel Dorrego	Canal 13	Episode: "La Vida Color de Rosas"
2006	Montecristo	León Rocamora	Telefe	
2006	Hermanos y detectives	Professor Fontán	Telefe	Episode: "El profesor Fontán"
2007	Los cuentos de Fontanarrosa	Chelo	TV Pública	
2007	El hombre que volvió de la muerte	Dante Mortensen	Canal 13	
2008	Mujeres asesinas	Mendoza	Canal 13	Episode: "Carolina, humillada"
2008	Socias		Canal 13	
2010	Todos contra Juan 2	Himself	Telefe	
2010	Para vestir santos	Carlos	Canal 13	
2010	Alguien que me quiera	Gustavo "Bambi" Melgarejo	Canal 13	
2010	Lo que el tiempo nos dejó	Military	Telefe	Episode: "La ley primera"
2010	Caín y Abel	Gregorio Mendel	Telefe	
2011	Historias de la primera vez		América TV	Episode: "La primevera vez en el amor"
2011	Maltratadas		América TV	Episode: "Eterno retorno"
2011	Televisión por la Inclusión		Canal 9	
2012	Lobo	Toribio Páez de Toledo	Canal 13	
2012	La defensora	Dr. Rafael Sartori	TV Pública	
2012	La viuda de Rafael	Rafael	TV Pública	
2013	Historias de corazón	Manuel	Telefe	Episode: "Para olvidar a Manuel"
2013	Las huellas del secretario	Francisco Basualdo	TV Pública	
2013	Historia clínica	Juan José Castelli	Telefe	Episode: "Juan José Castelli: El silencio del orador"
2014	La celebración	Agustín	Telefe	Episode 4: "Bautismo"
2014-2015	Viudas e hijos del Rock & Roll	Luis Emilio Arostegui III	Telefe	
2015	Cromo	Rizzo	TV Pública	
2016	Loco por vos	Claudio	Telefe	
2016	Educando a Nina	Reinaldo	Telefe	
2016	Las palomas y las bombas		TV Pública	
2017	Vida de película		TV Pública	
2017	Quiero vivir a tu lado	Guillermo	Canal 13	
2018	Sandro de América	Oscar Anderle	Telefe	
2018	El lobista		Canal 13	
2018	Rizhoma Hotel		Telefe	
2018-2019	Mi hermano es un clon	Juan Cruz Santillán	Canal 13	
2019	Atrapar a un ladrón	Gabriel Prieto	Telefe	
2020	Inconvivencia		Telefe	
2026	Moria	Carlos A. Petit	Netflix	

=== Movies ===
Year	Movie	Character	Director
1999	La venganza		Juan Carlos Desanzo
2000	Ojos que no ven	Forensic	Beda Docampo Feijóo
2000	El astillero		David Lipszyc
2000	Felicidades	Juan	Lucho Bender
2001	Vidas privadas	Eduardo	Fito Páez
2002	Todos juntos		Federico León
2002	Un oso rojo	Sergio	Adrián Caetano
2002	Claim	Hotel Receptionist	Martín Lagestee
2002	Potestad	Colombres	Luis César D'Angiolillo
2002	La entrega	Police	Inés de Oliveira Cézar
2005	A cada lado		Hugo Grosso
2007	Maradona, the Hand of God	Marcos Franchi	Marco Risi
2008	La revolución es un sueño eterno	Manuel Belgrano	Nemesio Juárez
2010	La mosca en la ceniza	Waiter José	Gabriela David
2010	Plumíferos	Mr. Puertas	Daniel De Felippo
2010	In the Future (En el futuro)		Mauro Andrizzi
2010	El mural	Natalio Félix Botana	Héctor Olivera
2010	Sin retorno	Ricardo	Miguel Cohan
2011	El invierno de los raros	Fabián	Rodrigo Guerrero
2011	Violeta se fue a los cielos	Interviewer	Andrés Wood
2012	Dormir al sol	Lucio	Alejandro Chomski
2012	La sombra azul	Commissar	Sergio Schmucler
2013	Destino anunciado	Pocho	Jhon Dickinson
2014	Necrofobia	Dante	Daniel de la Vega
2016	Los últimos		
2019	Sola		José Cicala
2019	Así habló el cambista		Federico Veiroj
2020	The Funeral Home		Bernardo
2023	The Settlers	Monseñor	Felipe Gálvez Haberle
2025	Belén		Dolores Fonzi

== Awards and nominations ==
Year	Award	Category	Work	Result
2001	Silver Condor Awards	Male Revelation	El astillero	Nominated
2004	Martín Fierro Awards	Supporting Actor in Drama	Padre Coraje	Winner
2005	Martín Fierro Awards	Supporting Actor in Drama	Criminal	Nominated
2006	Martín Fierro Awards	Supporting Actor in Drama	Montecristo	Nominated
2007	Martín Fierro Awards	Protagonist Actor of Miniseries	El hombre que volvió de la muerte and Los cuentos de Fontanarrosa	Nominated
2010	Martín Fierro Awards	Supporting Actor	Para vestir santos, Lo que el tiempo nos dejó and Caín y Abel	Nominated
2011	Konex Foundation	Theater Actor	Trajectory of the last decade	Winner
2013	Featured personality of the year, newspaper Rosario, Santa Fe, Argentina	Actor	Year's Trajectory	Winner
