= The Funeral Home =

- Directed by: Mauro Iván Ojeda
- Written by: Mauro Iván Ojeda
- Produced by: Néstor Sánchez Sotelo
- Cinematography: Lucas Timerman
- Music by: Jeremias Smith
- Production company: Del Toro Films
- Distributed by: 3C Films Group; Uncork'd Entertainment
- Release date: 21 August 2020 (Fantasia Festival)
- Country: Argentina
- Language: Spanish

The Funeral Home, also known as La Funeraria and The Undertaker's Home, is an Argentine horror film that was written and directed by Mauro Iván Ojeda.

The movie was the final film role for actor Hugo Arana, who died from COVID-19 in October 2020 (2 months after the film's release).

== Synopsis ==
An undertaker, Bernardo, lives with his family in a haunted funeral home. While both he and his stepdaughter Irina believe that the paranormal phenomenon may make them able to see their deceased loved ones, his wife Estela is unhappy. She thinks that he is too obsessed with the paranormal and that he resents her for not being able to give him a biological child. Estela also believes that the house is full of evil due to the machinations of Bernardo's dead father Salvator dabbling in the occult. This leads to an unhappy home environment that results in Irina unable to take part in her ballet hobby.

Bernardo eventually hires a psychic, Ramona, to cleanse the house of spirits. Once in the home Ramona picks up visions revealing the origin of the supernatural phenomena: Estela tricked Bernardo into putting his father in a nursing home, causing Salvador to retaliate by summoning a demon to kill her and Irina. He only grew regretful when he realized that the demon wouldn't stop until Bernardo was also dead. Salvator tried to stop the demon by summoning other spirits, resulting in the haunted home. As things grow more tense, Irina returns home from her grandmother's to help cleanse the house but calls her to pick her up once she becomes too frightened. When she arrives the grandmother is possessed and the demon uses her to kill Ramona.

Irina is chased through the house but has a moment of respite when she meets the spirit of her dead father. This is short lived, as the demon and supernatural phenomena continues to chase after her. Irina comes across the bodies of her mother and Bernardo. Her possessed grandmother attacks Irina, but is momentarily stopped by Estela. Fleeing, Irina takes refuge in a port-a-potty even as the demon tries to break in. It ceases only at dawn, marking the end of Salvator's pact with the demon. The demon leaves behind a ballet outfit as a present. She dons the outfit and dances for the ghosts of her family, after which they revert to their dead forms.

== Cast ==
- Luis Machín as Bernardo
- Celeste Gerez as Estela
- Camila Vaccarini as Irina
- Hugo Arana as Salvador
- Graciela Bonomi as Abuela
- Isabel Iglesias as Mirta Sánchez
- Pablo Peverelli as Padre Irina
- Susana Varela as Ramona

== Release ==
The Funeral Home premiered at Fantasia Festival on 21 August 2020 as The Undertaker's Home. This was followed by a limited theatrical release in the United States in January 2021 and a digital release the following month under the title The Funeral Home.

== Reception ==
Critical reception for The Funeral Home has been positive and the film holds a rating of 80% on Rotten Tomatoes, based on 15 reviews. Rue Morgue and Starburst both rated the film favorably, with the latter writing that "Although it gets a little too over-the-top - but fortunately not too much - in the final act, there's plenty to recommend here." Culture Crypt gave the movie a score of 70/100, stating "Once you get over the hump of an initially awkward layout, you can engage in the atmosphere's enchantment. Appreciators of smoldering suspense, competent indie aesthetics, and touches of foreign flair to flavor the familiarity will be pleasantly surprised at how much polish “The Funeral Home” puts on a traditional haunted house yarn."
