= Julio Chávez =

Argentine actor

Julio Hirsch (born 14 July 1956), known professionally as Julio Chávez, is an Argentine film, theater and television actor. He won the Silver Bear for Best Actor in 2007 for his performance in the film The Other.

He was born in Buenos Aires, and received his first film role in 1973. Since 1976, he has had leading roles in Argentine cinema and, more recently, in Argentine television.

== Theatre ==
Año	Obra	Dirección	Notas
1976	Lazarillo de Tormes	Luis Agustoni	
1977	El cuidador	Luis Agustoni	
1978	El sí de las niñas	José María Vilches	
1979	Pic-nic	Hugo Urquijo	
1980	Informe para una academia	Carlos Gandolfo	
1980	Homenaje	Carlos Gandolfo	
1981	El último premio	Marcelo Silguero	
1985	En boca cerrada	Agustín Alezzo	
1988	Fausto	Augusto Fernandes	
1989	El Pelícano	David Amitín	
1994	Madera de reyes	Augusto Fernandes	
1996	La gaviota	Augusto Fernandes	
1997-1999	El vestidor	Miguel Cavia	
2003	Maldita sea (la hora)		Director and writer
2003	Angelito Pena		Director and writer
2004	Rancho - Una historia aparte		Director and writer
2005	Mi propio niño Dios		Director and writer
2005-2006	Ella en mi cabeza	Oscar Martínez	
2007-2008	Yo soy mi propia mujer	Agustín Alezzo	
2007-2009	La de Vicente López		Dirección y autoría
2008	Como quien mata a un perro		Dirección y autoría
2009	Angelito Pena		Dirección y autoría
2010	Sweeney Todd	Ricky Pashkus y Alberto Favero	
2012	La cabra	Julio Chavez	Dirección, autoría e intérprete
2014	Red	Daniel Barone	
2016	Yo soy mi propia mujer	Agustín Alezzo	
2017	Un rato con él	Daniel Barone	
2019	La de Vicente López	Daniel Barone	
2020	Después de nosotros	Daniel Barone	Autoría
2021	Inés	Julio Chavez y Camila Mansilla	Dirección y autoría
2022-2023	Yo soy mi propia mujer	Julio Chavez	Dirección y autoría
2024	Lo Sagrado	Julio Chavez y Camila Mansilla	Dirección y autoría

== Filmography ==
Year	Title	Role	Director	Notes
1973	La malavida		Hugo Fregonese	
1976	No toquen a la nena	Willy	Juan José Jusid	
1977	La nueva cigarra		Fernando Siro	
1978	La parte del león	El Nene	Adolfo Aristarain	
1982	Señora de nadie	Pablo Toledo	María Luisa Bemberg	
1986	La película del rey	David Vass	Carlos Sorín	
1993	Refugio en la ciudad	Juan	Gregorio Cramer	Short film
1993	Un muro de silencio	Julio / Patricio	Lita Stantic	
1994	El acompañante		Alejandro Maci	Short film
1999	El visitante	Pedro Marin	Javier Olivera	
2002	La sombra		Nicolás Tuozzo	Short film
2002	Un oso rojo	Oso	Adrián Caetano	
2003	Extraño	Axel	Santiago Loza	
2005	El custodio	Rubén	Rodrigo Moreno	
2007	4 de julio: la masacre de San Patricio	Narrador	Juan Pablo Young y Pablo Zubizarreta	
2007	El otro	Juan Desouza / Manuel Salazar / Emilio Branelli / Lucio Morales	Ariel Rotter	
2017	El Pampero	Fernando	Matías Lucchesi	
2022	Cuando la miro	Javier	Julio Chavez	Director and Screenplay Writer

== Television ==
	Year	Title	TV Channel	Role	Notes	Episodes
1973	Alguien como vos	Canal 13	Julio	Supporting Actor	10 episodes	
1973-1974	Alguien como usted	Canal 13	Pablo Rodríguez	Supporting Actor	19 episodes	
1982	Los siete pecados capitales	ATC	Sergio	Recurring Character	2 episodes	
1985-1986	Rompecabezas	Canal 11	Ismael	Supporting Actor	39 episodes	
1990	Le roi de Patagonie	France 3	Pikkendorf	Recurring Character	4 episodes	
1992-1993	Zona de riesgo	Canal 13	Bruno	Supporting Actor	63 episodes	
1996	De poeta y de loco	Canal 13	Antonio	Co-Star	37 episodes	
1997	Archivo negro	Canal 13	Mateo	Leading Role	20 episodes	
2004-2009	Epitafios (aka 'Epitaphs')	HBO	Renzo Márquez	Leading Role	26 episodes	
2009	Tratame bien	El Trece	José Chokaklian	Leading Role	37 episodes	
2011	El puntero	El Trece	Pablo Aldo "El Gitano" Perotti	Leading Role	39 episodes	
2013-2014	Farsantes	El Trece	Guillermo Graziani	Leading Role	125 episodes	
2015	Signos	El Trece	Antonio Cruz	Leading Role	16 episodes	
2017	El maestro	El Trece	Abel Prat	Leading Role	12 episodes	
2018	El host	FOX	Himself	Guest	1 episode	
2019-2021	El Tigre Verón	El Trece	Miguel "El Tigre" Verón	Leading Role	20 episodes	

== Awards ==
Wins

- Argentine Film Critics Association Awards: Silver Condor, Best Actor, for El Otro; 2008, Best Actor, for El Custodio; 2007, Best Actor, for A Red Bear; 2003.
- Lleida Latin-American Film Festival: Best Actor, for A Red Bear; 2003.
- Bogota Film Festival: Honorable Mention, Best Actor, for El Custodio; 2006.
- Berlin International Film Festival: Silver Bear, Best Actor, for El Otro; 2007.
- Association of Latin Entertainment Critics Awards: Best Actor, for El Custodio; 2008.
- Tato award as best lead actor in drama for Farsantes, 2013
- 2013 Martín Fierro Awards: best actor of daily drama (for Farsantes)

Nominations

- Argentine Film Critics Association Awards: Silver Condor, Best Actor, for El Visitante; (2000).
- Argentine Film Critics Association Awards: Silver Condor, Best Actor, for Extraño; (2005).
