= Santo Biasatti =

Argentine journalist

Santo Virgilio Biasatti (born December 6, 1943) is an Argentine journalist. He has worked in both television and radio, and received the Golden Martín Fierro Award in 1996.
