= Chunchuna Villafañe =

Argentine model, actress and architect (1934–2026)

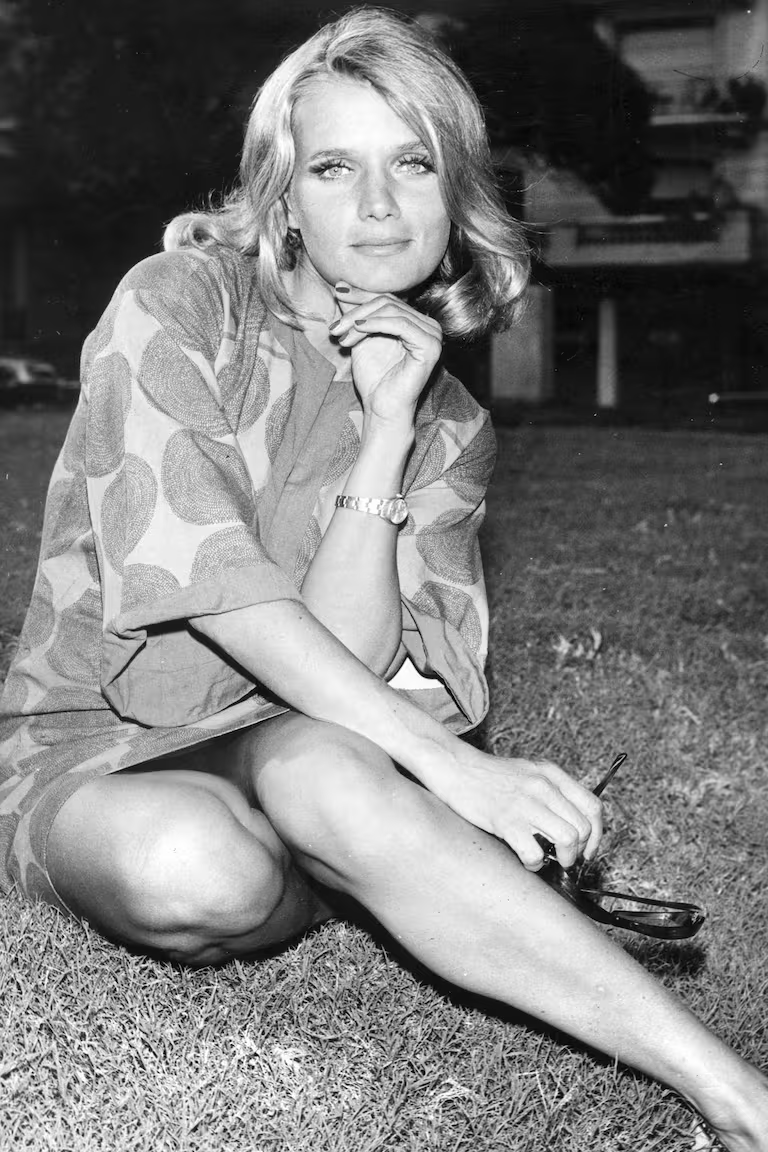
- Villafañe in 1970
- Born: Elva Chunchuna Villafañe; April 9, 1934; Buenos Aires, Argentina
- Died: June 4, 2026 (aged 92)
- Occupations: Model; actress; architect
- Years active: 1971–2017
- Spouse: Horacio Molina
- Children: Juana Molina; Inés Molina

Elva "Chunchuna" Villafañe (April 9, 1934 – June 4, 2026) was an Argentine model, actress and architect.

== Life and career ==
Elva Chunchuna Villafañe was born in Buenos Aires, Argentina on April 9, 1940.

She appeared in film and television from 1971. Her most well known role was as Ana in La historia oficial (1985).

Villafañe died on June 4, 2026, at the age of 92.

== Filmography ==
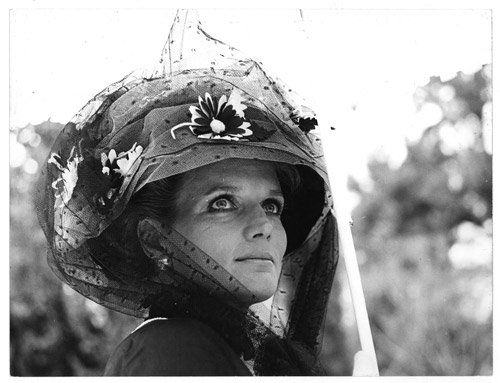
Villafañe in Un guapo del 900 (1971)

- Un Guapo del 900 (1971) (a.k.a. A Player out of the 1900s)
- No toquen a la nena (1976)
- La historia oficial (1985) as Ana (a.k.a. The Official Story)
- Sostenido en La menor (1986) (a.k.a. Padre, marido y amante - Argentina)
- time of your mother (1988)
- Nunca estuve en Viena (1989) as Carolina (a.k.a. I Never Been in Vienna)
- Algunas mujeres (1992)
- Historia de desiertos (1995)
- Vidas privadas (2001) as Sofía Uranga (a.k.a. Privates Lives)
- Micaela, una película mágica (2002) as Micaela's grandmother
- Extraño (2003) as Ana's mother (a.k.a. Strange)
- Cochabanba (2005) as la cocha de la banba (a.k.a. La Cocha)

== Television ==
- Extraños y amantes (1985) TV series as Micaela
- Atreverse (1990) TV series
- El Beso del olvido (1991) (TV)
- Las Amantes (2001) TV series
- Sol negro (2003) (mini) TV mini-series as Andrea Estévez
- Durch Himmel und Hölle (2007) (TV)

== Awards ==
Nominations

- Argentine Film Critics Association Awards: Silver Condor, Best Supporting Actress (Mejor Actriz de Reparto), for Vidas privadas; 2003.
