= José Chatruc =

Argentine football midfielder

Jose Chatruc
Personal information
- Full name: Jose Manuel Chatruc
- Date of birth: November 9, 1976 (age 49)
- Place of birth: Buenos Aires, Argentina
- Height: 1.75 m (5 ft 9 in)
- Position: Midfielder

Senior career*
Years	Team	Apps	(Gls)
1995–1999	Platense	62	(6)
1999–2002	Racing Club	92	(16)
2002–2003	San Lorenzo	32	(7)
2003	Grasshoppers	13	(1)
2004	Barcelona SC	31	(3)
2005	Estudiantes	23	(1)
2006	Quilmes	27	(2)
2007	Banfield	9	(0)
2007–2009	Racing Club	21	(1)
2009–2010	Tiro Federal		
2012	Club Mercedes	1	(1)
- * Club domestic league appearances and goals as of 11:49, 4 October 2009 (UTC)

Jose Chatruc (born 9 November 1976) is an Argentine football midfielder. He is of Ukrainian descent.

Chatruc made his league debut on 11 March 1996 for Platense in a 1–0 defeat to Lanús. In 1999, he joined Racing Club where he has played over 100 games in his two spells with the club. He was part of the championship winning team in Apertura 2001.

Chatruc has played outside Argentina for Grasshoppers of Switzerland and Barcelona Sporting Club of Ecuador. He has also played for a number of other clubs in Argentina including San Lorenzo, Estudiantes, Quilmes and Banfield. In 2007, he rejoined Racing for a second stint with the club.

In 2009, he joined Tiro Federal of the Argentine 2nd division.

== Honours ==
Racing Club

- Argentine Primera División: 2001 Apertura

San Lorenzo

- Copa Sudamericana: 2002

Grasshopper

- Swiss Super League: 2002–03
