= Jorge Falcón =

Peruvian comedian (born 1953)

Jorge Hernández Ramírez, better known as Jorge Falcón or Jo-jo-jorge Falcón (born July 14, 1953) is a Mexican comedian, impersonator and singer well known for his stand-up routines.

== Biography ==
Jorge Falcón was born as Jorge Hernández Ramírez in Chilpancingo, Guerrero, as the eldest of eight siblings. He at first studied dentistry but as he needed some money for himself he would sing and play guitar at night clubs. It was there where he first discovered his gift for telling jokes which attracted the entrepreneurs and soon he dedicated himself to comedy full time.

== Career ==
He was known for his famous voices and funny faces, and frequently appeared on famous comedy shows such as Humor es... los Comediantes, La Casa de la Risa (which he hosted), the famous Latin American variety show Sábado Gigante, among others.

He has written four books – the first two of self help and the third one a book of jokes for children.

== Personal life ==
Falcón has been married twice, having a daughter from his first marriage which lasted a year and four children from his second marriage. He lives in Jacksonville, Florida.

In 2021, Falcón announced his retirement from live shows as he considers them too bearing for his age.
