= Marcelo Araujo =

Argentine sports journalist (1947–2026)

Marcelo Araujo (né Lázaro Jaime Zilberman; 12 June 1947 – 16 March 2026) was an Argentine sports journalist who worked from 1989 to 2004 on Fútbol de Primera. In 2008, he was against Julio Grondona, the president of the AFA; in 2011, he supported him. He was a play by play narrator of Gillette Prestobarba Excel Open Tournament vía TyC Max (live broadcast matches) and TyC Sports (tape-delay matches). His peculiar style included the use of swear words in his stories. Araujo died on 16 March 2026, at the age of 78.
