= Torneos y Competencias =

Argentine sports communications firm

Torneos y Competencias S.A.
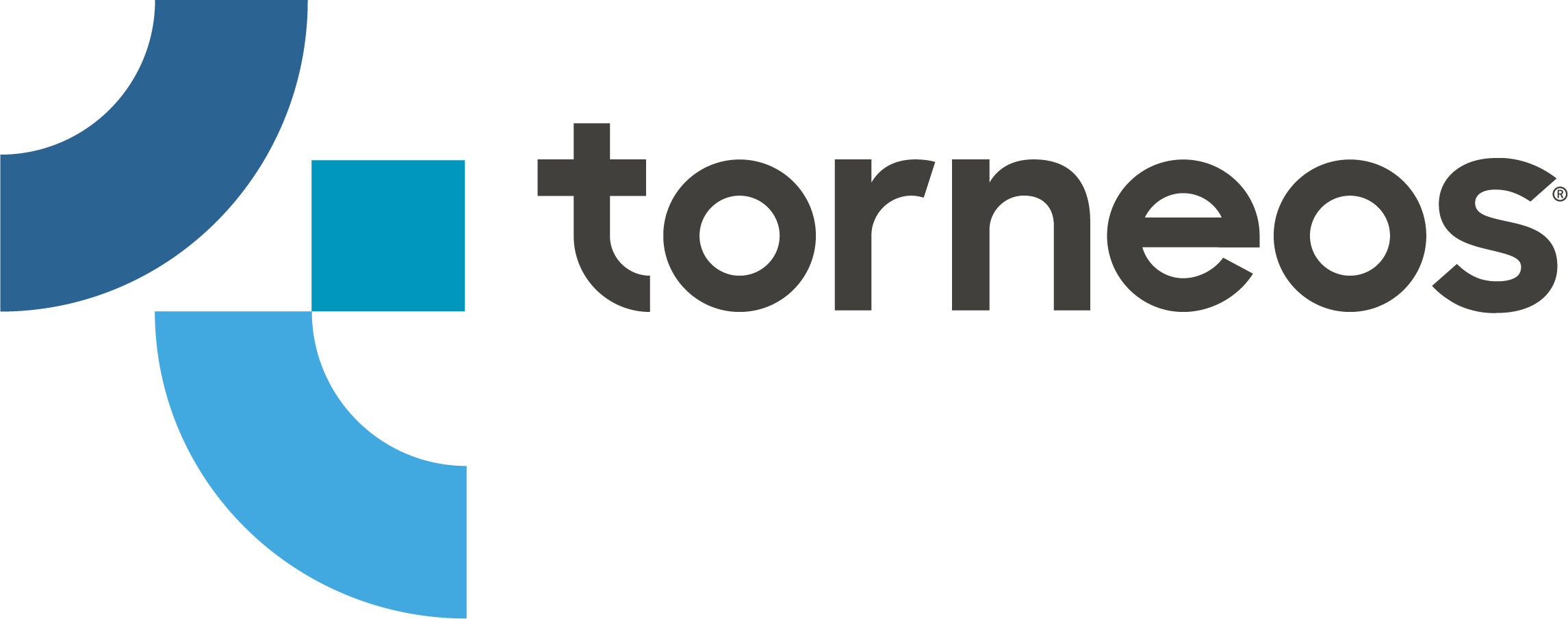

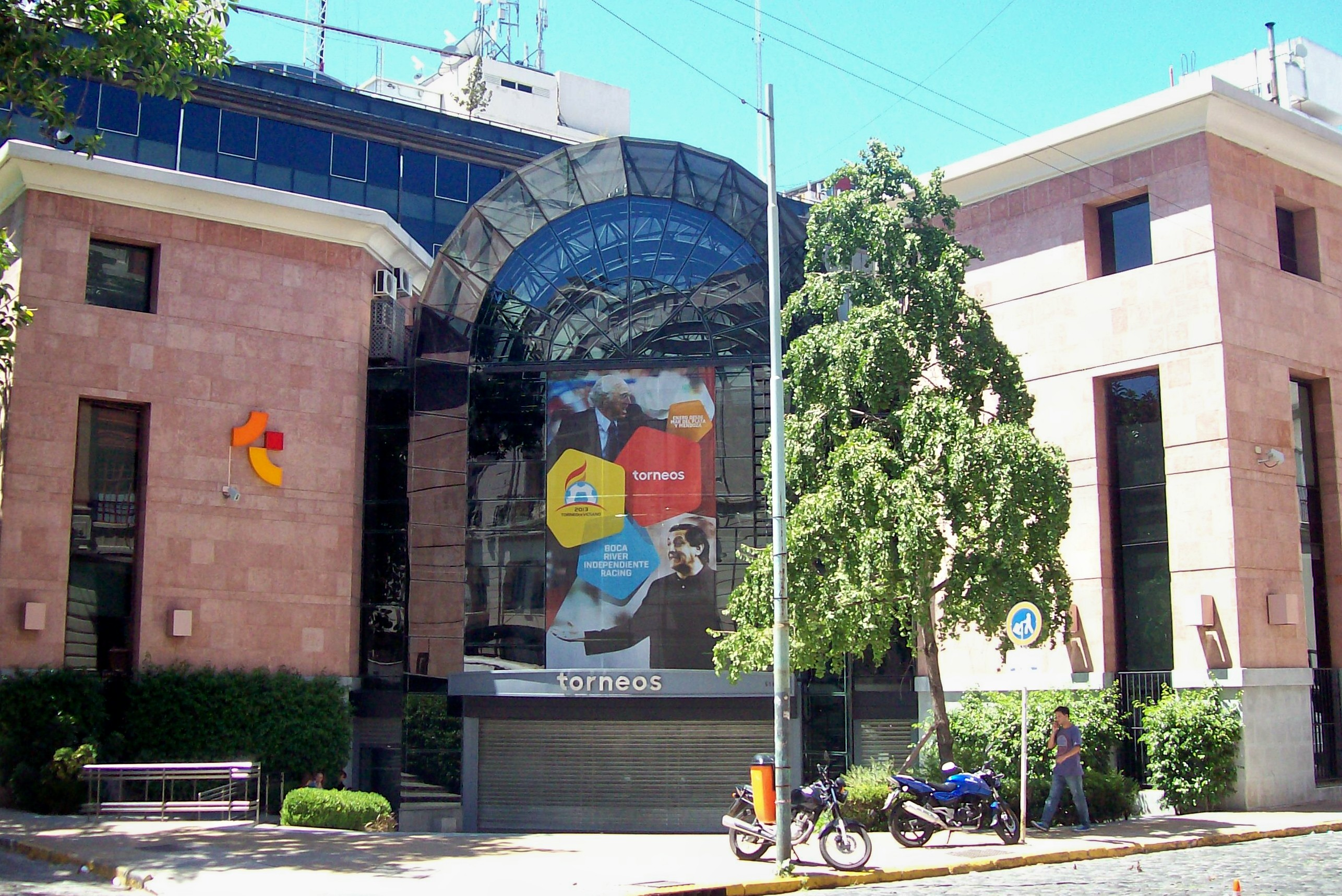
- Headquarters in Buenos Aires
- Company type: Private
- Industry: Media
- Founded: 1982; 44 years ago
- Headquarters: Buenos Aires, Argentina; Medellín/Bogotá, Colombia
- Key people: Ignacio Galarza, CEO
- Products: Television
- Owners: Vrio Corp. (65%); Grupo Nofal (35%)
- Divisions: List: TyC Sports; TyC Sports Latin America; TyC Sports COL; TyC Sports USA; TyC Sports URU; DSports; DNews; Win Sports; TNT; TNT Sports; ESPN; ESPN Premium; Disney+; Fanatiz
- Website: torneos.com

Torneos y Competencias S.A. (abbreviated TyC, also referred as Torneos) is an Argentine sports communications firm created by businessman Carlos Ávila, associated with Jose Santoro, and Héctor Dayan. It is an important force in the world of Argentine sports, with interests in publications and radio and TV broadcasting. Its headquarters are in Buenos Aires.

== History ==
Torneos started its activities in the Argentine media in 1982, with a golf program. Since then it produced and aired successful programs in network television such as El deporte y el hombre, Tenis de Primera, Fútbol de Primera and La Magia de la NBA; the most successful of them being the weekly Fútbol de Primera, which summarizes each day of competition in the Argentine first division.

In 1994, Torneos launched the channel TyC Sports to broadcast the Argentine Primera Division.

=== Removal of first division television rights ===
In 1992, the company Televisión Satelital Codificada (TSC, a joint venture between TyC and the Clarín group) signed an agreement with the Argentine Football Association (AFA) for the broadcasters exclusive live of Argentine football matches. All the official matches were available on the "TyC Sports" and "TyC Max" cable & satellite channels. This agreement expired in 2014.

In July 2009, due to an economic crisis that affected several Primera División clubs, the AFA tried new ways of financing. The President of the AFA, Julio Grondona, requested TSC authorities to modify the contract for television rights in order for the AFA to receive 720 million Argentine pesos. However, in the last season, TSC paid the AFA 230 million pesos, and the request was rejected by TSC.

Later, Grondona received an offer from the Argentine government in order for the National System of Public Media – the state-owned Channel 7 – to replace TSC for broadcasting the games on TV. Cristina Fernández de Kirchner's government has a public confrontation against the Clarín group, a member of TSC.

On August 11, 2009, the AFA broke the contract with TSC, accusing it of not fulfilling the agreement. Then, the AFA sued TSC, but TyC also tried an unsuccessful lawsuit against the AFA for cancelling the contract. Evertithing Follow producing of the Second and Third Division.

Since August 21, 2009, the television rights for Argentine Primera División belongs to the state-owned TV Pública. The matches are carried by TVP and various stations in interior Argentina; the broadcasts are known as Fútbol para todos.

=== Present ===
On 30 March 2016 the AFA approved the contract with the company that includes the Argentine Primera División, Argentine Second Division, Primera B Metropolitana, Argentine Cup, Argentina national football team's friendly and qualifiers games, and the international media rights, until 2019.

== Channels ==
Torneos and the 34 South Media Group (before Clarín Group) in Argentina currently operate the domestic pay TV channel TyC Sports, as well as two international pay TV channels TyC Sports Latin America, TyC Sports COL, TyC Sports PER, TyC Sports URU and TyC Sports USA. Torneos produced most sport shows for Fox Sports Latin America - South Cone, including the airing of Copa Libertadores, Copa Sudamericana, Formula One and many others.

== Exclusive Rights ==
The company’s television rights includes: Copa Libertadores, Copa Sudamericana, Recopa Sudamericana, Argentine First Division, Argentine Second Division, Primera B Metropolitana, Argentine Cup, Argentina national football team friendlies and qualifiers games, international media rights and the Summer and Winter Tournaments from Mar del Plata, Salta, Mendoza and Córdoba (via ESPN Premium, ESPN, TNT Sports, TNT, TyC Sports, TyC Sports Latin America, TyC Sports Colombia and TyC Sports USA).

== Incidental music ==
For many years and for the presentation of the company's programs, the musical theme of the final credits of the film Blade Runner called End Titles, composed by Vangelis, was used. This same theme was used in the early years of Fútbol de Primera (TV program), the production company's flagship program.
