= TyC Sports =

Argentine sports television channel

- Country: Argentina
- Broadcast area: Argentina; United States; Latin America
- Headquarters: Buenos Aires, Argentina

Programming
- Language: Spanish
- Picture format: 1080i HDTV (downscaled to 16:9 480i/576i for the SDTV feed)

Ownership
- Owner: Werthein Group

History
- Launched: September 3, 1994; 32 years ago

Links
- Website: www.tycsports.com

Availability

Streaming media
- FuboTV: Internet Protocol television
- Sling TV: Internet Protocol television
- YouTube TV: Internet Protocol television
- DirecTV Stream: Internet Protocol television

TyC Sports is a pay television sports channel owned by Torneos, based in Buenos Aires, Argentina. The channel broadcasts the Argentine B Nacional, CONMEBOL Qualifiers, Argentina national football team friendly matches, Liga Nacional de Básquet, the Argentina Open, and other sports. Outside of Argentina, the channel broadcasts the Argentine Primera División. TyC Sports broadcasts in the Spanish language. In Latin America, it is available on DirecTV on channel 629, and on channel 1629 in Hi-Def.

The Werthein Group, which controls Torneos y Competencias, announced it was acquiring the remaining 50% of TyC Sports' shares from the Clarín Group, gaining complete control of the channel; this was announced on May 28, 2026.

== Channels ==
The following television channels are considered part of TyC Sports:

- TyC Sports
- TyC Sports 2
- TyC Sports 3
- TyC Sports 4
- TyC Sports Latin America
- TyC Sports USA

== Programming ==
- FIFA World Cup (only in Argentina)
- Copa America (only in Argentina)
- CONMEBOL Qualifying (only in Argentina)
- Argentine Primera Division (except Argentina)
- Copa Argentina
- Argentina Internationals (only in Argentina)

=== Basketball ===
- Liga Nacional de Básquet
- FIBA World Cup Basketball (Only in Argentina)

=== Motor Sports ===
- TC 2000
- Top Race

=== Tennis ===
- Argentina Open (Only in Argentina)
- Davis Cup (Only in Argentina)
- Fed Cup (Only in Argentina)

=== Volleyball ===
- Liga Argentina de Voleibol

=== Others ===
- IAAF World Championships in Athletics
- Boxeo de Primera (Live boxing cards every Saturday night; shown on many countries im the Americas)

=== News and analysis programming ===
- Esports Ubeat
- Cien contra Uno
- Antes y Después del Partidazo
- Gimnasia en Casa
- Fútbol y Tenis: En Equipo de Primera
- Planeta KO

== Discontinued programs ==
- El Faro
- Punto Extremo
- TyC Sports Radio
- Noveno Chukker
- Veinticinco

=== Match archive programming ===
- TyC Sports Clásico
