= Daniel Barone =

Argentine film and television director (born 1965)

- Born: August 21, 1965; Buenos Aires, Argentina
- Occupations: Film director, television director
- Years active: 1995–present

Daniel Barone (born 21 August 1965, Buenos Aires) is an Argentine film and television director. He worked at the production company Pol-ka Producciones. He left the company in 2021. He is best known for films including Alma Mia (My Soul) and Cohen vs. Rosi, a box office hit about conflict and reconciliation between two families in Buenos Aires – one Italian, the other Jewish.

== Biography ==
Daniel Barone studied dramatic arts at the school of Raúl Serrano from 1985 to 1989. After directing several theater productions in Buenos Aires and Santiago in Chile, he studied film at the school of the Soviet Union Embassy in Argentina. At the 1991 Young Art Biennial, he received a special mention from the Communication Sciences jury for his radio program Encrucijada. Following this recognition, he worked as an assistant director on various independent feature films and short films.

His first work in television came in 1995, when he directed the second unit of Poliladrón, a weekly series broadcast on El Trece.
