= Fútbol de Primera (TV program) =

Fútbol de Primera is an Argentine television programme that broadcast the football matches of the Argentine Primera División. It was produced by Torneos y Competencias. It began on ATC in 1985, moved to Canal 9 in 1992, and then was broadcast Eltrece up to 2009, when it was cancelled as a result of the cancellation of the contract between the Argentine Football Association and TyC and the creation of Fútbol para todos. The program received the Golden Martín Fierro award.
