= DSports =

Latin American sports television channel

- Broadcast area: Argentina; Aruba; Barbados; Chile; Colombia; Curaçao; Ecuador; Guyana; Peru; Suriname; Trinidad and Tobago; Uruguay; Venezuela

Programming
- Language: Spanish
- Picture format: 1080i HDTV (With possible rescale to 16:9 480i/576i); 2160p UHDTV (in some events)

Ownership
- Owner: Vrio Corp. (Grupo Werthein)
- Sister channels: DNews; OnDirecTV

History
- Launched: 13 July 2009; 17 years ago
- Former names: Canal 680 (2006–2009); DirecTV Sports (2009–2022)

Links
- Website: www.directvsports.com

DSports (formerly known as DirecTV Sports) is a Latin American sports subscription television channel owned by satellite provider Vrio Corp. and operated by Torneos. The network broadcasts and operates its feeds from Argentina, Chile and Uruguay, and also broadcasts to parts of Caribbean, Colombia, Ecuador, Peru and Venezuela. As Vrio's own channel, it is offered by any other paid TV operator, except for its own on demand service DGO, which would later expand to Mexico and Brazil through their service.

== History ==
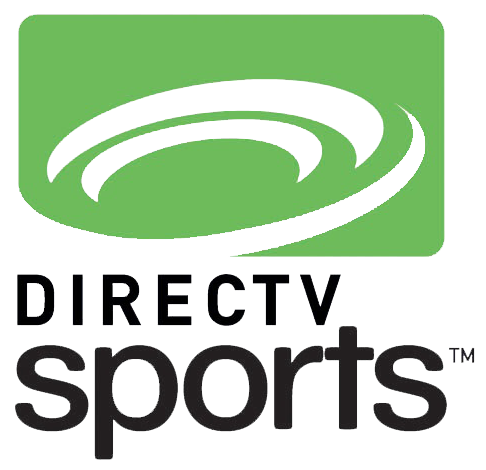
DirecTV Sports logo, used from 2009 to 2013.

DirecTV Sports logo, used from 2013 to 2018.

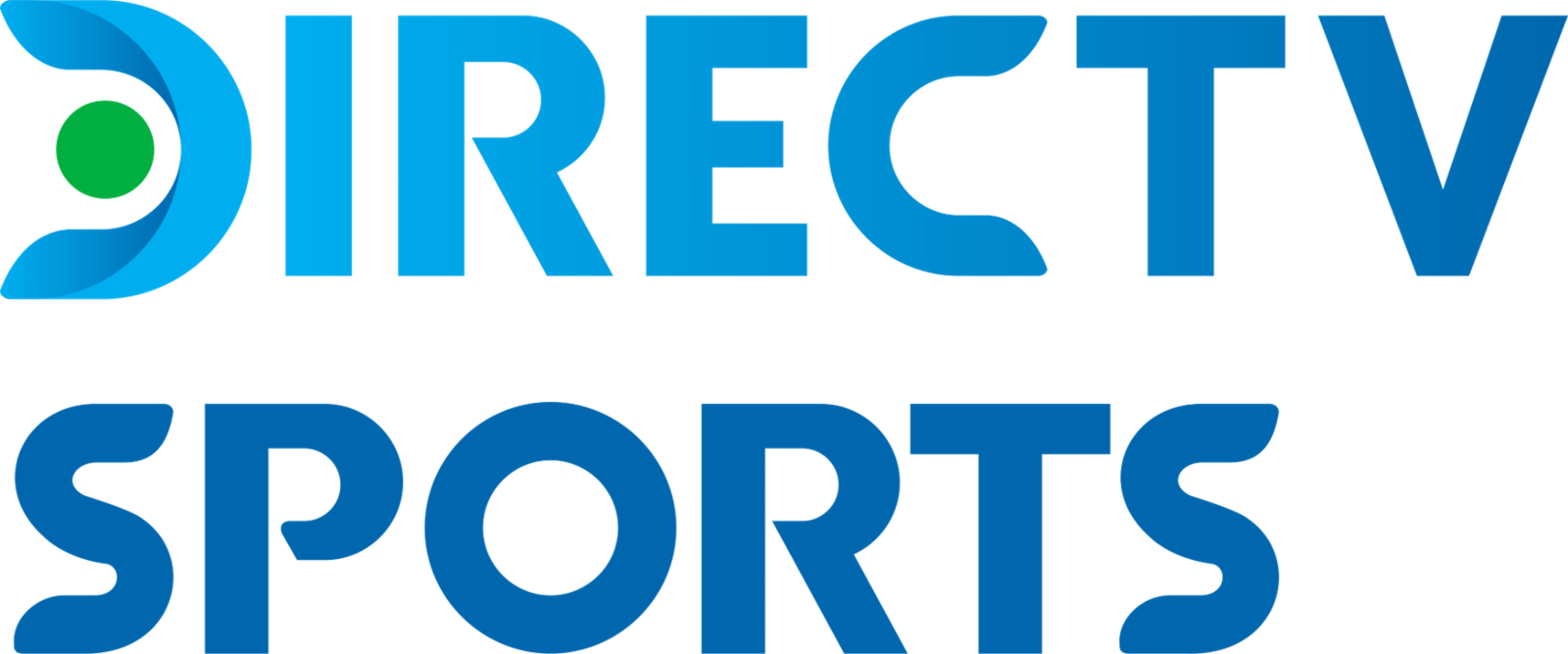
DirecTV Sports logo, used from 2018 to 2022.

The sports channel was first launched in 2006 to coincide with the start of the 2006 FIFA World Cup in Germany and was launched under the name Mundial Total. Among the channel's features were the multichannel system, multi-camera and instant replays, all in panoramic format. Shortly afterwards, after airing content such as La Liga, Ligue 1 and some games from the Premier League were added to its schedule, which it would stop broadcasting for a few years, but would resume exclusively in 2013. The channel was known as Canal 680 before finally being called DirecTV Sports in July 2009, with the channel managing a set of alternative channels that were responsible for broadcasting several sporting rights simultaneously, such as football, tennis and basketball on channels 614, 615, 616, 617 and 618 in HD. From 2010 to 2011, it continued to show the past FIFA World Cups.

On May 19, 2019, DirecTV Venezuela ceased operations due to US sanctions against pro-Maduro TV channels Globovisión and PDVSA TV in 2019, with the channels requiring mandatory transmission imposed by the telecommunications commission of Venezuela, CONATEL, while the US sanctions simultaneously blocked the transmission of DirecTV channels in the region.

On August 14, 2020, as a result of the 2019 sanctions against the channels, DirecTV Venezuela was sold to Chilean company Scale Capital. DirecTV Sports Venezuela was rebranded as SimpleTV Sports.

On November 14, 2022, before the 2022 FIFA World Cup, the channel was rebranded to DSports with a new logo and presentation.

== Feeds ==
=== DSports ===
- Panregional feed: available in Argentina, Chile, Colombia, Ecuador, Peru, Uruguay and Venezuela

=== DSports 2 ===
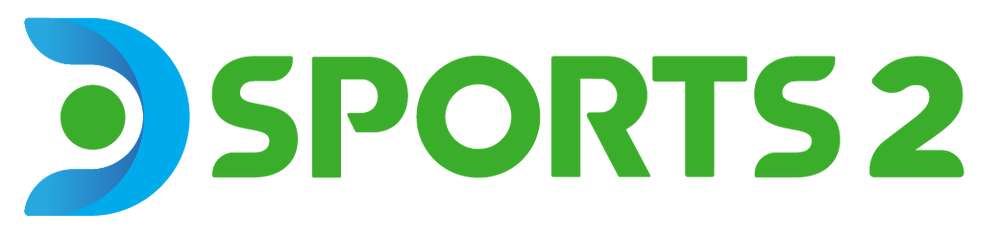
DSports 2 logo

- Panregional feed: available in Argentina, Chile, Colombia, Ecuador, Peru, Uruguay and Venezuela

=== DSports+ ===
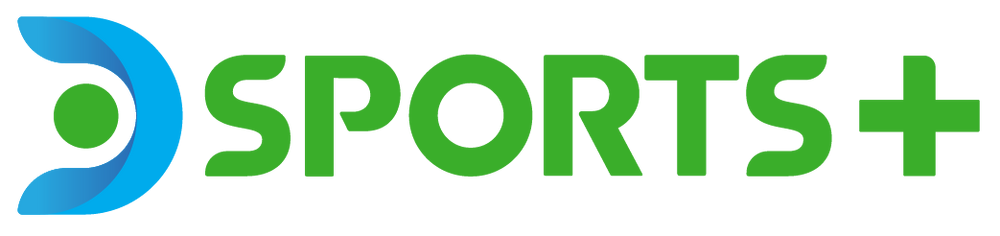
DSports+ logo

- Panregional feed: available in Argentina, Chile, Colombia, Ecuador, Peru, Uruguay and Venezuela

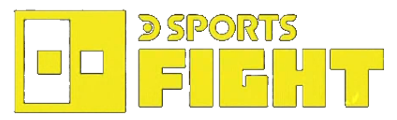
DirecTV Sports Fight logo

=== Closed channels ===
- DSports Fight — It was launched on February 18, 2022, to air events related to boxing, wrestling and martial arts. It was shut down on February 7, 2026
- DSports Motor — It was launched on June 5, 2023, to air events related to motorsports. It was shut down on December 31, 2024.

== Sport events ==
List of events that can be viewed on DSports Networks:

=== Football ===
- FIFA World Cup
- FIFA Women's World Cup
- FIFA Club World Cup
- FIFA Intercontinental Cup
- FIFA U-20 World Cup
- FIFA U-17 World Cup
- La Liga
- LaLiga Hypermotion
- Coppa Italia
- Coupe de France
- KNVB Cup
- Johan Cruyff Shield
- Copa América
- Copa Sudamericana
- Primera Nacional (only in Argentina)

=== Basketball ===
- Basketball Champions League Americas
- EuroLeague
- FIBA EuroBasket
- FIBA EuroBasket Women
- FIBA AmeriCup
- FIBA World Cup
- FIBA Women's World Cup

=== Combat sports ===
- Professional Fighters League
- Glory
- Karate Combat
- Enfusion
- WGP Kickboxing
- Fusion Fighting Championship
- Arano Box

=== Cycling ===
- Giro d'Italia
- UAE Tour
- Tirreno–Adriatico
- Tour de Suisse
- Strade Bianche
- Milan–San Remo
- Milano–Torino
- Giro di Lombardia
- Classic Brugge–De Panne
- E3 Saxo Bank Classic
- Tour of the Basque Country
- GP Miguel Induráin

=== Rugby ===
- Torneo de Córdoba
- Torneo del Litoral
- Torneo del Noroeste
- Torneo del Oeste
- Top10

=== Tennis ===
- Davis Cup

== See also ==
- ESPN Latin America
- TyC Sports
- GOL TV
- Claro Sports
- Win Sports
- Win Sports+
- Fox Sports (Latin America)
- Fox Sports (Argentina)
- TNT Sports (Argentina)
- TNT Sports (Chile)
- Tigo Sports
