= RCN Nuestra Tele Internacional =

- Country: Colombia
- Broadcast area: International
- Network: Canal RCN
- Headquarters: Bogotá, Colombia

Programming
- Picture format: 1080i HDTV (downscaled to 16:9 480i/576i for the SDTV feed)

Ownership
- Owner: RCN Televisión
- Sister channels: RCN Televisión; NTN24; Win Sports; Win+ Fútbol; RCN Novelas

History
- Launched: April 3, 2003; 23 years ago
- Former names: TV Colombia (2003-2012); RCN Nuestra Tele (2012-2018)

Availability

Streaming media
- YouTube TV: IPTV
- FuboTV: IPTV
- DirecTV Stream: Internet protocol television
- Sling TV: IPTV

RCN Nuestra Tele Internacional (previously known as TV Colombia and RCN Nuestra Tele) is an international pay television channel owned by Colombian television network RCN. It is a Spanish-language network aimed to Colombian and Latin American viewers around the world. It broadcasts television programs produced by RCN Televisión, most of them previously aired in this network in Colombia, and a few other shows from other companies, along with the Colombian First Football Division. It is broadcast in Australia and New Zealand via UBI World TV without any timeshifting. DirecTV added the channel on 28 April 2010.

Until 2008, RCN Nuestra Tele also broadcast some programs from Citytv Bogotá.

Until early 2011, RCN Nuestra Tele aired news in English under the direction of American news anchor Brian Andrews.

== Logo history ==
TV Colombia logo from April 3, 2003 to 2011

TV Colombia logo from 2011 to 2012
