= NTN24 =

Colombian television news channel

- Country: Colombia
- Broadcast area: Colombia; International
- Headquarters: Bogotá, Colombia

Programming
- Language: Spanish
- Picture format: 480i (SDTV)

Ownership
- Owner: RCN Televisión
- Key people: Claudia Gurisatti (Director)
- Sister channels: Canal RCN; Win Sports; Win Sports+ RCN Nuestra Tele Internacional; RCN Novelas

History
- Launched: 3 November 2008

Links
- Website: ntn24.com

Availability

Streaming media
- NTN24.com: Watch live
- FuboTV: IPTV
- Sling TV: IPTV
- Vidgo: IPTV
- YouTube TV: IPTV

NTN24 (acronym for Nuestra Tele Noticias 24) is a Colombian cable television news channel, owned and operated by RCN Televisión.

NTN24 was launched on 3 November 2008 with journalist Claudia Gurisatti appointed as the channel's first editorial director. Its main headquarters are located in Washington D. C. and Bogotá, Colombia.
