= Werthein Group =

Argentine holding company

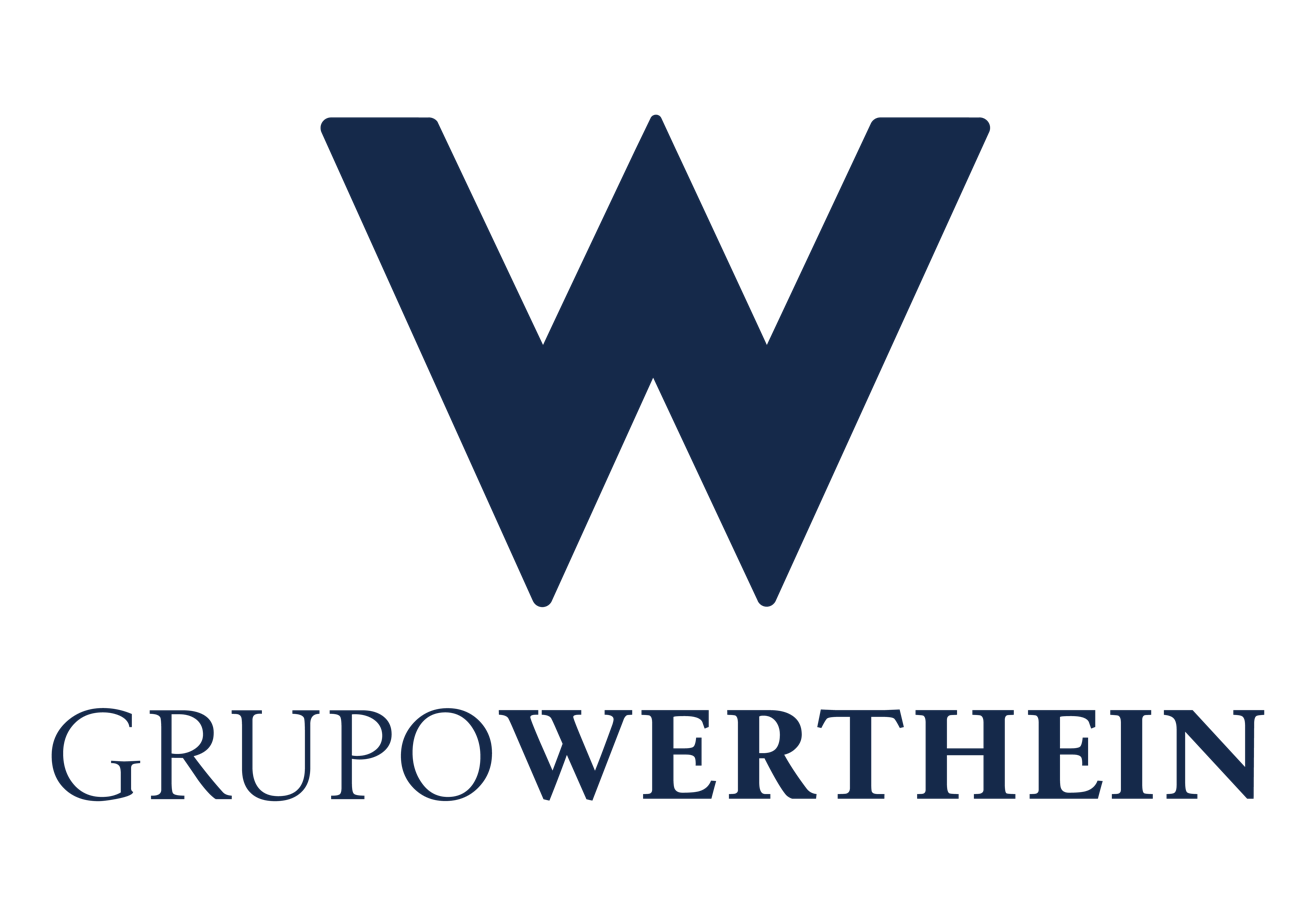
- Industry: Investments
- Founded: 1928
- Headquarters: Buenos Aires, Argentina
- Subsidiaries: Agroindustry: Gregorio, Numo y Noel Werthein S.A.; Food and beverages: Cachamai / Cachamate; Arroyo Verde; Valley / Frutty; WHT Partners / Riglos Wines; Real Estate Developments: Argentina; United Kingdom; United States; Media Tech: DirecTV; DGO; DFibra; DSports; DNews; DFight; DMotor; OndirecTV; Sky; Sky+; Sky Fibra; Torneos; Win Sports; Mundea; Health: SML; SOI; Tria; Insurance: Experta ART; Experta Seguros; Vrio Corretora Brasil; DirecTV Seguros; Technology: Fivvy; Overlabs; Illumia
- Website: www.grupowerthein.com/en

Grupo Werthein (Werthein Group) is a holding company founded in 1928 and based in Argentina, led by members of the Werthein family since its origins.

Born dedicated to agribusiness, food, beverages and insurance sectors in Argentina, the holding company has expanded both in Argentina and throughout the adjacent regions, diversifying its investment portfolio since 2003. The group controls a media tech company with entertainment, information and connectivity services, and has expanded its business ecosystem with real estate development, insurance, health, technology, food and beverage and human capital development.

The Group employs more than 8,200 direct collaborators and has a network of around 35,000 partners in the region.

== History ==
In 1904, Leon Werthein, a merchant from Bessarabia, decided to leave the Russian Empire due to the hostility towards the Jewish people. His destination was Argentina. A year later, his wife, Ana Jajam, arrived with their four children: Gregorio, Elisa, Numo and Israel. In Argentina, the couple had four more children: Abraham, Fany, Noel and Julio. In the town of Ingeniero White, Bahía Blanca, Buenos Aires Province, León Werthein worked in the port: first as a stevedore, then as a foreman. Then, he settled in Salliqueló, where he opened a general store. The next step was to move to Miguel Riglos, in Atreucó, La Pampa, where, together with his sons, he opened another general store in 1917. León Werthein died in 1935, and his descendants continued the family business.

== Foundation ==
Although León and his sons began working and trading upon their arrival in Argentina, the Werthein Group formally originated in 1928 in the town of Miguel Riglos, where Gregorio, Numo and Noel founded the agricultural company that bears their names: "Gregorio, Numo y Noel Werthein S.A." (GNNW). This firm would set the beginning of the family business in a sector in which the company grew, endures and continues to be a fundamental part of the holding in the 21st century. Already in the first half of the 20th century, the family diversified its business and some members ventured into the hotel sector: in Mar del Plata, Buenos Aires, Carhué and Río Hondo.

Noel, Numo, Julio and Leo Werthein founded different companies:

- Noel and Numo Werthein co-founded Tel Aviv University in 1968, together with George S. Wise.
- Noel Werthein was president of the Argentine-Israeli Chamber of Commerce.
- Gregorio Werthein was president of Banco Israelita del Río de la Plata, in Buenos Aires, Argentina.
- Julio Werthein, León's youngest son, was responsible for the family's entry into the financial sector, with the acquisition of Banco Mercantil in 1963, which laid the foundations for the Group's future activity in the sector. He was also president of the Buenos Aires Stock Exchange (2002–2005) and of CICYP (Inter-American Council of Commerce and Production). Julio died in 2013.
- Leo Werthein, Noel's son, played an important role in the expansion of the agribusiness, after taking an interest in and significantly collaborating with the Werthein family's contribution to the development of livestock genetics. In 1979 he began to manage "Gregorio, Numo y Noel Werthein S.A." (GNNW). He was president of the Argentine Angus Association, director of the Sociedad Rural Argentina and president of the Tzedaká Foundation, thus becoming a reference of the group until his death in 2005.

== Growth and expansion ==
Although since the 1930s the Werthein family has been engaged in several businesses, during the last two decades of the twentieth century, with the third and fourth generation of the family in business, the Group merged production and services. Today, it includes agribusiness, mass consumption, insurance, health, food and beverages, real estate, technology, telecommunications and entertainment. The Group is still controlled by members of the Werthein family, with Darío, Daniel and Adrián as shareholders, while other members of the family, such as Gregorio, Lucas and Andrés, are part of the new generation of directors.

=== Shareholders ===
- Daniel Werthein: Noel's son, he studied veterinary medicine, was an important part of the Group's agricultural activity, especially in livestock genetics, and vice-president of the DAIA Foundation (Argentine Delegation of Israelite Associations).
- Adrián Werthein: Noel's son, public accountant. He started his career in the family business in the agricultural and livestock field. He is a member of the Board of Directors of the Buenos Aires Stock Exchange, was President of the Latin American Jewish Congress (CJL) and is a member of the executive committee of the World Jewish Congress.
- Darío Werthein: Leo's son, former board member of the Buenos Aires Stock Exchange, chair of the Board of Trustees of World ORT and member of the executive board of the American Jewish Joint Distribution Committee. He is currently Treasurer of the Leo Werthein Foundation and leads the sustainability program Propósito Vrio; he is a member of the Board of Trustees of Fordham University and a member, as of 2020, of the Board of Scholas Occurrentes USA. In September 2024, he was selected by Bloomberg as one of the most influential people in Latin America.

== Economic group ==
=== Agribusiness ===
The company that has represented the Group in this industry since 1928 is "Gregorio, Numo y Noel Werthein S.A." (GNNW). Focused on the production and export of value-added products, it specializes in commercial cattle production and cattle genetics, with Aberdeen Angus and Hereford breeds, in the Pampean region; and Braford and Brangus, in the north of the country. Its farms include Cabaña La Paz (Buenos Aires Province) and Cabaña Los Guasunchos (Santa Fe Province), which show their animals at the most important exhibitions in the country and have won several awards.

=== Media Tech Company ===
In 2003 the Group acquired the operations of Telecom Personal in Uruguay and Paraguay, which were held until 2017. In 2021 the Werthein Group acquired the Vrio Corp. business unit, a digital entertainment provider that began operations in 1996. Vrio is the leading provider of entertainment, information and connectivity in South America, Mexico and the Caribbean. Vrio Corp. occupies an incremental retail and wholesale distribution space through DirecTV and SKY Brasil brands and its DGo streaming platform. It offers services in Brazil through the SKY brand and in Argentina, Barbados, Chile, Colombia, Curaçao, Trinidad and Tobago, Ecuador, Peru and Uruguay through the DirecTV brand. DGO is present in all those markets with the addition of Mexico. Vrio also includes Torneos in Argentina and Colombia.

Their investments and businesses provide services to 10 million registered customers, impacting 40 million people with their products and services.

In June 2024, Ameya Prabhu, president of Aarna Holdings, announced a strategic alliance with the Werthein Group that involves significant investments in Argentina.

In August 2024, Grupo Werthein announced the creation of Skx, a fintech that will operate in Brazil.

In March 2025, DirecTV acquired the broadcasting rights for the FIFA Club World Cup in South America.

The Group has also partnered with Amazon to provide satellite internet in Argentina, Brazil, Chile, Uruguay, Peru, Ecuador, and Colombia. The project aims to provide coverage especially in rural and hard-to-reach areas. In April 2025, Amazon began deploying its Kuiper Project satellite constellation with the KA-01 mission, which will enable DIRECTV to offer these services.

In November 2025, most of Grupo Werthein's assets related to media and tech were combined into Waiken ILW, a new holding.

==== Owned Signals ====
- DSports
- DFight
- DMotor
- Win Sports
- DNews
- OnDirecTV

==== DirecTV Latin America ====
It provides entertainment and information services in Argentina, Chile, Colombia, Ecuador, Peru, Uruguay and the Caribbean.

==== DGO ====
It is a direct-to-consumer streaming platform: it provides live local and international TV content, sports programming, news and OnDemand service of movies, series and documentaries. It has presence in Brazil, Argentina, Chile, Colombia, Ecuador, Peru, Uruguay and Mexico.

==== SKY ====
It is the largest satellite paid TV company in Brazil.

==== SKY+ ====
It is a direct-to-consumer streaming platform from Brazil.

==== Torneos ====
It is a leading company in the generation and production of content for the sports and entertainment industry. It is dedicated to the comprehensive organization and production of events, the acquisition and commercialization of rights, and the management of licenses and e-commerce for the main sports clubs and federations

==== Win Sports ====
It is a Colombian sports subscription television channel focused on broadcasting football content from the country.

==== Dfibra and Sky Fibra ====
It is a 100% fiber optic internet service from DirecTV and SKY.

==== Mundea ====
It is a digital travel agency that offers reservations of tickets, accommodations, travel packages, cars, and recreational activities.

=== Food and beverages ===
The group is present in the food industry with the production of infusions, with its brand Cachamai; in fruit derivatives, with the Valley production plant, and in wine products, through the company WHT Partners.

==== Cachamai: tea, biscuits, mate ====
Cachamai has been in the market for more than 60 years, especially recognized for its digestive tea. Cachamai has been part of the Werthein Group since 2004, when it acquired Cachay S.A., the company that owns the brand.

In addition to yerba mate and tea, since 2020 Cachamai has marketed a line of healthy biscuits. In January 2025, they launched a new traditional yerba mate, without additives and gluten-free. In September, the company expanded its product portfolio into the mass consumption segment with the launch of cookies, cereal bars, and bars made with dehydrated fruit under the Frutty brand.

==== Valley: fruit derivatives ====
It is dedicated to the production and commercialization of dehydrated fruit derivatives, especially apples. It supplies the best raw materials obtained at specific moments of harvest, exporting to the 5 continents, with the United States and Europe being the main markets. The Valley production facility is located in Alto Valle, Río Negro, Argentina. Since 2023 it markets Frutty, a product made of dehydrated apples without additives or preservatives. The brand's infusions are sold in Argentina and other markets located in Europe, Asia and America.

==== WHT Partners: premium wine industry ====
The Group is present in the beverage industry through WHT Partners, a company dedicated to investments related to the premium wine industry. In addition to producing and marketing wines, it offers tourism and promotional experiences related to the products. Market participation is carried out through the Riglos and Huarpe boutique winery brands. Riglos generates its production in its vineyards at Finca Las Divas, located in Uco Valley, Mendoza. The site has 72 hectares, more than half of which are planted with Malbec, Cabernet Sauvignon, Cabernet Franc and Sauvignon Blanc. In 2012, Wine Enthusiast magazine chose "Riglos Gran Corte 2009" as the best wine of the year. In order to grow in the premium wine business, in June 2016 Bodega Riglos merged with the boutique winery Huarpe Wines, owned by the Hernández Toso Brothers. Huarpe Wines has its winery in Agrelo, Luján de Cuyo, Mendoza. Its products include "Huarpe Series", a line of blends from different regions of Mendoza; and Taymente", a line of eight varietals.

=== Real Estate Developments ===
The Group has a real estate development business unit. Through Landmark Developments, the Group carries out several projects. It has built more than 500,000 m2 in a series of developments in Argentina and other countries in the region. Among the main projects under development are:

- Udaondo, in the City of Buenos Aires, North Corridor, Nuñez.
- Luciérnagas Pilar, in the Buenos Aires Province, Argentina.

=== Health ===
The Werthein Group is present in the health area through "SOI Centro Médico" and "SML" (Sistema Médico Laboral). SOI Medical Center provides ambulatory medical services in the City of Buenos Aires, and specializes in the care of patients who have suffered work-related accidents or suffer from occupational diseases. Specialties: Plastic Surgery, General Surgery, Kinesiology Occupational Medicine, Occupational Health, Orthopedics and Traumatology. SML (Sistema Médico Laboral), is a company that manages the medical-health care services related to the recovery of the health of 1,000,000 workers within the Occupational Risks System. It manages a network of 3,000 providers with a presence in Argentina.

In October 2025, the group launched Tria, a telemedicine company using artificial intelligence that provides occupational health management services for private companies and public organizations. The platform initially operates in Argentina with more than 20,000 workers and plans to expand to Brazil and Central America.

=== Insurance ===
The Group's activity in this area began in the 1990s and, for 15 years, it was a partner of the Italian holding company Assicurazioni Generali, which was dissolved in 2014 with the division of its assets. The Group remained with La Caja ART (Aseguradoras de Riesgos del Trabajo) and, after the acquisition of the Australian company QBE ART, became Experta ART. Currently, its presence in the insurance business consists of the companies Experta Seguros, Experta ART and La Estrella Compañía de Seguros de Retiro. Experta, with presence in all the provinces of Argentina, started its operations in labor insurance and expanded to property and life insurance. Its portfolio includes collective life, personal accident, theft, agriculture, home, car and occupational risk insurance.

=== Technology ===
==== Fivvy ====
Fivvy is a B2B Fintech created in the United States that helps Banks, Retailers, and Insurers in Latin America and the United States to better understand their customers and competitors.

==== Overlabs ====
In September 2024, the Group launched Overlabs, a technology services company offering consulting, software development, and applications. It began operations in Brazil, with plans to expand to other Latin American countries in 2025.

==== Illumia ====
In May 2025, Grupo Werthein launched Illumia, a generative AI company focused on customer service and sales solutions through digital assistants, with an investment of 40 million dollars.

== Norma & Leo Werthein Foundation ==
Since 2009, it promotes and supports programs and activities related to Education, Culture, Inclusion and Agriculture for the benefit of the most vulnerable population.

=== Purpose Vrio ===
Vrio has one purpose: to preserve the culture of each country, strengthen diversity in the region and boost the economy through investments to contribute to the sustainable development of communities. Purpose Vrio consolidates and integrates all the initiatives that represent the heart of the holding.

=== School + ===
An audiovisual education program for primary and secondary schools aimed at bridging the technological gap and promoting its pedagogical use for the development of students' skills. It provides educational institutions with technology, educational content, didactic materials and training for teachers throughout the region. In January 2025, the foundation inaugurated three School+ classrooms in Ecuador, in schools located in the communities of Itulcachi and Yunguilla, as well as in the Chocó Andino Reserve.

The Foundation produced Feik Ñus, an educational audiovisual project about the risks associated with fake news. In March 2025, the series was awarded at Mi Primer Festival, an international film event for children and youth in Peru. In April of the same year, the Foundation organized in Jujuy, together with the National Pedagogical University, the training program "Towards an Inclusive Education Connected to the Digital Future", a free 180-hour course for primary and secondary school teachers.

=== Investments, acquisitions and participations, by decade ===
1930s

- YPF Agent

1940s

- Representatives of Banco Nación
- Import, distribution and sale of Ford trucks (Canada).

1950s

- Imports Gregorio and Numo Werthein
- Ford Motor Company Dealer
- Hanomag Tractor Agent
- Werthein Seed Dealers
- El Hogar Argentino Bank

1960s

- La Defensa Insurance Company
- Manufacturers of Dumont Televisions
- Banco Mercantil Argentino
- Sale and distribution of Federal Trucks

1970s

- Citrex, Valley Evaporating Company and Tucumán Citrus

1980s

- Finca Flichman Winery

1990s

- Partners in the investment fund CEI (Citicorp Equity Investments)
- La Caja, 1994–2015

2000s

- Participation in Finca Sophenia
- Partner in Standard Bank Argentina
- Telecom Argentina, 2003–2017
- Transportadora de Gas del Sur (Southern Gas Transporter)

2020s Vrio Corp.
