= Vrio Corp. =

Latin American communications company

- Formerly: Galaxy Latin America Investments, LLC (1994–2000); DirecTV Latin America, LLC (2000–2018)
- Industry: Telecommunications
- Founded: 1994; 32 years ago
- Headquarters: Bogota, Colombia (via DGO)
- Products: Satellite television
- Parent: Grupo Werthein
- Subsidiaries: DirecTV Argentina; DirecTV Chile; DirecTV Colombia; DirecTV Ecuador; DirecTV Peru; DirecTV Uruguay; Sky Brasil; Torneos (65%)
- Website: vriocorp.com at the Wayback Machine (archived 2022-04-27)

Vrio Corp. (formerly DirecTV Latin America LLC; stylized as Vгio.) is an American-headquartered company that manages the commercial operations of the Latin American branch of DirecTV (mostly known as DirecTV Latin America). It produces TV content and owns several TV channels.

As of November 2021, it is owned by Grupo Werthein from Argentina. In 2025, Vrio has become part of Werthein's media and tech holding company Waiken ILW.

== History ==
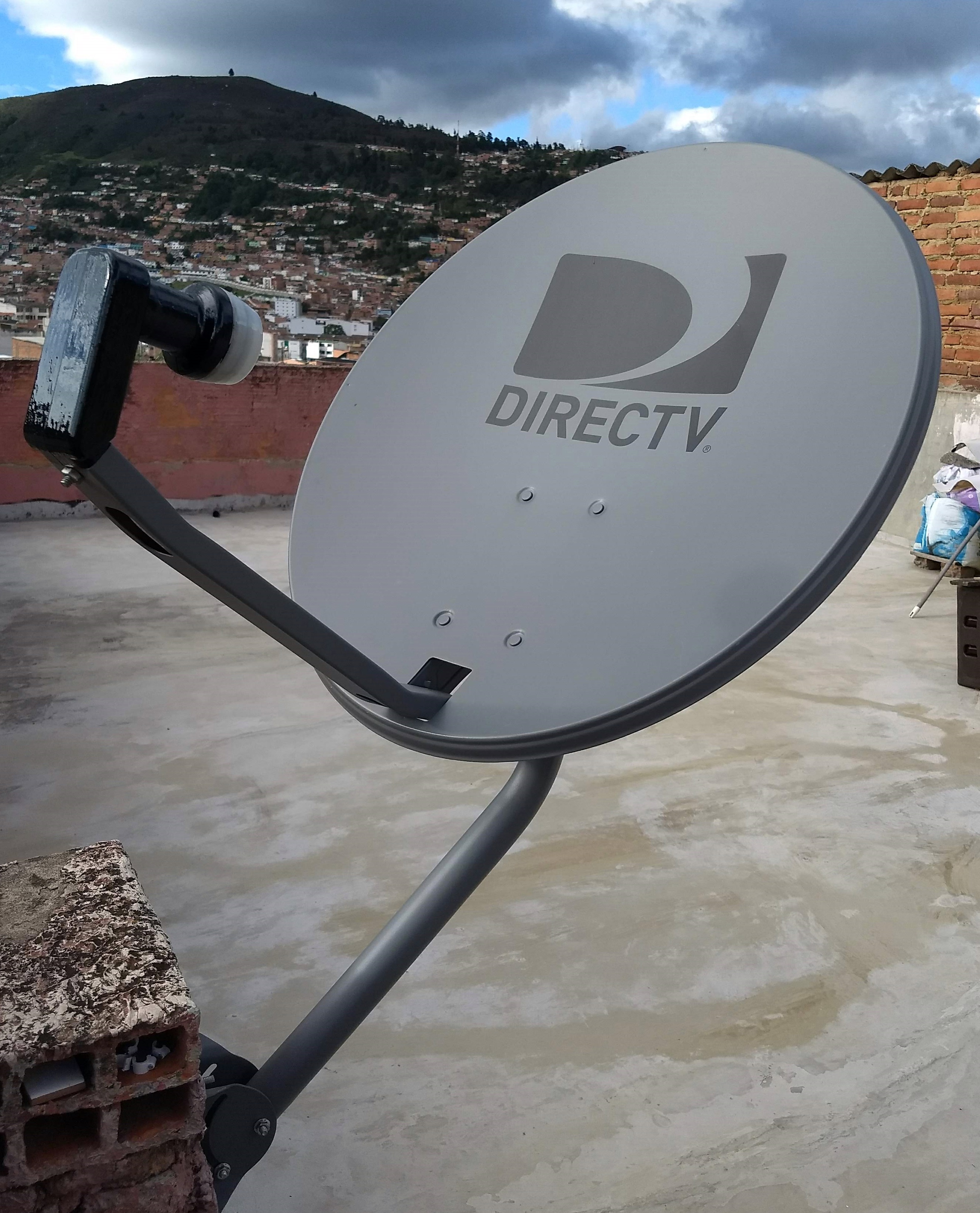
DirecTV SF6 2-LNB "round" satellite dish in Latin America

In 1994, Hughes Electronics Corporation and Venezuelan media company Grupo Cisneros create a joint venture named Galaxy Latin America, a company intended to distribute DirecTV services in 27 Latin American countries, initially with an offer of 144 channels. In the following years, it enters the Chilean market and then it was launched in Mexico.

In 2000, Galaxy Latin America LLC was renamed as DirecTV Latin America LLC. On December 19, it announced its exclusive rights for both 2002 and 2006 World Cups, valid for Argentina, Mexico, Chile, Colombia, Venezuela and Uruguay. The following year, it announced the creation of a pop-up channel to cover the World Cup in full, with interactive functions, for Chile, Colombia and Uruguay, produced by Venevision International. On September 24, 2001, it launched in Uruguay.

In late 2003, now-defunct News Corporation acquired a controlling stake of 34% in Hughes Electronics for US$6 billion, which included a portion of DirecTV Latin America. As News Corp. already had similar operations across Latin America, it was announced a merge in the following year, which consisted on combining DirecTV and Sky operations in the region. Sky México and Sky Brasil absorbed their DirecTV counterparts and their customers, while the Sky brand was defunct in Argentina, Chile and Colombia, as well as other countries, in favor of DirecTV.

In 2005, Grupo Cisneros sold its 14% stake on DirecTV Latin America to The DirecTV Group Inc. DirecTV was later exchanged for shares to Liberty Media in 2008, spun-off into a separate company in 2009 and then bought by AT&T in 2015.

On January 17, 2016, the Secretary of Environment of Bogotá, sanctioned DirecTV's Colombian subsidiary, Directv Colombia Ltda., with a sum of $118 million for placing advertisement without the proper permission from the city. The company violated Decree 959, published in 2000, that regulates where companies can place public publicity.

On September 15, 2017, Reuters reported that AT&T, the owner of DirecTV's U.S. and Latin American divisions, had hired an advisor to consider offering DirecTV Latin America on the public stock market. The principal motive was cited as the need to reduce the debt load AT&T would assume if it took over Time Warner as planned. Since that date, the U.S. Dept. of Justice filed suit to block that acquisition on antitrust grounds, a trial is scheduled to start on 19 March 2018 before Judge Leon of the U.S. District Court for the District of Columbia, and a decision is not expected before June–July. However, even if the deal is blocked, AT&T might dispose of the division as not core to its business.

The initial public offering of the new company called Vrio Corp., which would consist of the Latin America assets of DirecTV, was announced on March 7, 2018. On April 19 of that same year, the IPO was cancelled hours before the new stock was to start trading. The AT&T subsidiary's Vrio branding has been kept since then.

On May 19, 2020, the company ceased operations in Venezuela, due to US sanctions against pro-Maduro TV channels Globovisión and PDVSA TV in 2019. These channels require mandatory transmission imposed by the telecommunications commission of Venezuela, CONATEL, while the US sanctions simultaneously block the transmission of these channels.

On July 21, 2021, AT&T Latin America announced that they would sell Vrio to Grupo Werthein, which will include all DirecTV operations in Latin America and SKY Brasil (while keeping the broadband operations in Colombia and their stake at Sky México). The sale was completed on November 16, 2021.

== Operations by country ==
=== Brazil ===
SKY Brasil operates a subscription television service in Brazil since 1996. It received DirecTV Brazilian customers in 2006.

=== Chile ===
The Chilean subsidiary of DirecTV has operated in the country since 1994, but only started distributing DirecTV to customers after getting permission from the government in 1996. It absorbed Sky Chile into its operations in 2006, which had been launched in 1998. It signed an agreement with GTD Manquehue to offer full telephone, television, and internet services throughout the country.

In 2012, it made an agreement with Club Deportivo Universidad Católica to carry the brand name DirecTV on their jerseys. In 2014, it made an agreement with Liga Nacional de Básquetbol de Chile and, in 2015, with the association football club Colo-Colo, to also carry the DirecTV logo.

As of 2024, DirecTV had a 18.2% market share in Chile pay TV, according to Subtel.

=== Mexico ===
DirecTV used to operate in Mexico, but was merged with Sky México in a 2006 reestructure. Its assets are no longer part of Vrio since the company was sold to Grupo Werthein, in a deal that didn't include Sky México.

== Channels ==
=== DSports ===
DSports logo

DSports is a group of sports channels that are exclusive to DirecTV subscribers, featuring primarily association football, basketball, cycling and combat sports.

=== DNews ===
DNews logo

DNews is a news channel that was launched in 2022, whose programming is based on newscasts and journalistic programs in partnership with other international outlets such as Deutsche Welle, BBC, AFP, Reuters and Europa Press.

On August 4, 2023, DNews would celebrate its first year of existence with an event held at the channels headquarters in Buenos Aires with involvement of high personality participating in the event.

=== OnDirecTV ===
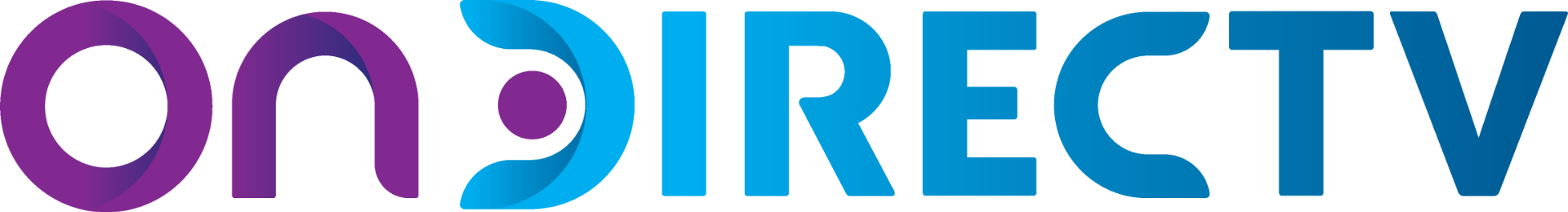
OnDirecTV logo

OnDirecTV was a entertainment channel that airs series, movies, documentaries, musical events and beauty pageants exclusively for its subscribers.

== DGO and Sky+ ==
DGO logo

Sky+ logo

DGO (previously known as DirecTV Go) and Sky+ are over-the-top video streaming services that includes both linear channels and video on demand. The service was launched in 2018 in Argentina, Chile and Colombia. In 2019, the service was expanded to Ecuador, Peru and Uruguay, then Mexico and Brazil in 2020.

DirecTV satellite subscribers have free access to the service, but Sky Mexico and Sky Brazil subscribers do not. On October 11, 2022, DirecTV Go was rebranded as DGO. On December 6, 2023, DGO was rebranded as Sky+ only in Brazil.
