= Win+ Fútbol =

Colombian pay television channel

- Country: Colombia
- Broadcast area: Colombia; Latin America; United States; Puerto Rico
- Affiliates: Win Sports; DSports; DSports 2 DSports+
- Headquarters: Bogotá

Programming
- Language: Spanish

Ownership
- Owner: DirecTV; RCN Televisión

History
- Launched: 20 January 2020

Links
- Website: Win Sports

Win+ Fútbol (formerly known as Win Sports+) is a Colombian subscription television sports channel specializing in football that was launched on 20 January 2020. The channel's programming consists of news reporting, live programs and broadcasts of the Colombian football Categoría Primera A, Categoría Primera B, and Copa Colombia.

Its prices range from CO$ 21,000 to CO$30,000 in HD per month per subscriber, CO$100,000 for commercial establishments, and a pay-per-view service of CO$30,000 per match to be viewed.

== History ==
In 2019, at meetings with representatives of the Dimayor, it was agreed that Win Sports would launch a premium channel called Win Sports+ to go on air in 2020, broadcasting only live football matches at a cost of COP$30,000 per month. Win Sports+ would broadcast the 10 first-division matches per round, the 3 second-division matches per round, the 4 Copa Colombia matches per round, 3 Liga Femenina matches per round, the Superliga Colombiana, 4 Turkish league matches per round, 5 Bundesliga matches per round, and all Difútbol matches. The channel would not air advertising during match play in the Liga, Torneo, Copa and Liga Femenina, and matches not broadcast live there would be aired on the main and alternate basic signals. However, with the launch of Win Sports+, Colombian professional football matches stopped being broadcast on free-to-air television. The channel came to have original productions such as Win+ Noticias, Primer Toque, Línea de 4 and Mucho + Fútbol.

During the COVID-19 pandemic in Colombia, Colombian football was paused, and since the channel had just begun broadcasting, it did not air programmes and therefore did not charge its subscribers. The economic effects were such that the signal price dropped by one third when the football league resumed.

== Criticism ==
Despite the promise of improvements in the channel's broadcasts, criticism of Win Sports+ quickly emerged, emphasizing its high cost for subscribers and technical errors during live match broadcasts. Because of these issues, the hashtag #LoPagaráSuMadre became trending on Twitter. Critics mentioned that there was no reason to charge that price given the poor condition of stadiums and the low level and quality of Colombian football. However, the then president of Win Sports, Jaime Parada, said these criticisms were a natural reaction and expected.

== See also ==
- Television in Colombia
- Win Sports
- Fútbol RCN
- Antena 2
