= Win Sports =

Colombian pay television channel

Win Sports Somos deporte Vamos por más
- Type: Subscription television
- Country: Colombia
- Broadcast area: Colombia
- Transmitters: Canal RCN; Torneos
- Affiliates: Win+ Fútbol; DSports; DSports 2 DSports+
- Headquarters: Calle 11 # 65-51, Salazar Gómez, Puente Aranda, Bogotá

Programming
- Language: Spanish
- Picture format: 1080i HDTV (downscaled to 16:9 480i for the channel's standard definition signal)

Ownership
- Owner: Torneos (50%); Canal RCN (50%)

History
- Launched: November 29, 2012
- Founder: Canal RCN and DirecTV

Links
- Website: www.winsports.co

Win Sports is a Colombian subscription television sports channel focused on broadcasting football from that country. The major shareholders are Torneos and Canal RCN; the Dimayor is one of its minority partners.

== History ==
It began test operations on August 1, 2012, and officially launched on November 28 of the same year.

In February 2013, the channel launched an alternate signal called Win Sports 2, which has a multicamera system, similar to that used in the 2014 FIFA World Cup. The channel is only available in the event that 2 sporting events are broadcast simultaneously.

At the end of March 2014, it launched Win Sports Online, its own paid online platform, which requires a subscription to watch the channel's signal over the internet at the international level.

Since August 5, 2015, Win Sports reached an agreement with several television distributors to increase viewership to more than 6 million households.

In September 2019, following Radamel Falcao García's arrival to Galatasaray, the channel announced that it had acquired broadcast rights to the Turkish Süper Lig. In meetings with representatives of the Dimayor, it was agreed that Win Sports would launch a premium channel called Win Sports+ (read "plus") that would go on air in 2020, in which only live football matches would be broadcast at a cost of COP$ 30 thousand per month. Win Sports+ would broadcast 10 first division matches per matchday, 3 second division matches per matchday, 4 Copa Colombia matches per matchday, two Liga Femenina matches per matchday, the Colombian Superliga (starting in 2020), 4 Turkish league matches, 5 Bundesliga matches and all Difútbol matches. The channel will not broadcast advertising and the matches that would not be broadcast live there will be broadcast on the basic and alternate signals. However, with the launch of Win Sports+, Colombian League matches will stop being broadcast on open television. The channel will have original productions, such as the programs Win+ noticias, Primer Toque, Linea de 4 and Mucho + fútbol.

In mid-September 2020, Win Sports announced that it won a battle against television piracy, when the Criminal Chamber of the Superior Council of Judicature of Bogotá ratified and confirmed the conviction against TV Pau and/or Fibranet, an organization that distributed the Win Sports signal without the channel's authorization.

== Programming ==
Its programming is sports-oriented and consists of sports news information such as: Win Noticias, live sports programs and sports broadcasts of the Liga Dimayor, the Torneo Dimayor, the Copa Colombia, the Superliga Colombiana, the Dimayor Women's League, the FIFA U-20 Women's World Cup, the Futsal League, the Basketball League, the TC2000 Colombia Automobile Race and other events broadcast live.

The channel's programming consists of news reporting, live programs and broadcasts of the Colombian football Categoría Primera A, Categoría Primera B, Copa Colombia and some Colombia national team matches, as well as Davis Cup.

In September 2020, Win Sports broadcast the German Bundesliga. Not only that, Win Sports also broadcast the Super Cup as the part of DFL broadcasting rights package contract

== Presidents ==
- Mauricio Correa Peña (2012-2019)
- Jaime Parada Rojas (2019-2023)
- Andrea Guerrero Quintero (2023-)

== See also ==
- Television in Colombia
- Win+ Fútbol
