= DirecTV =

American satellite television provider

DirecTV, LLC
- Logo used in the United States since September 13, 2025

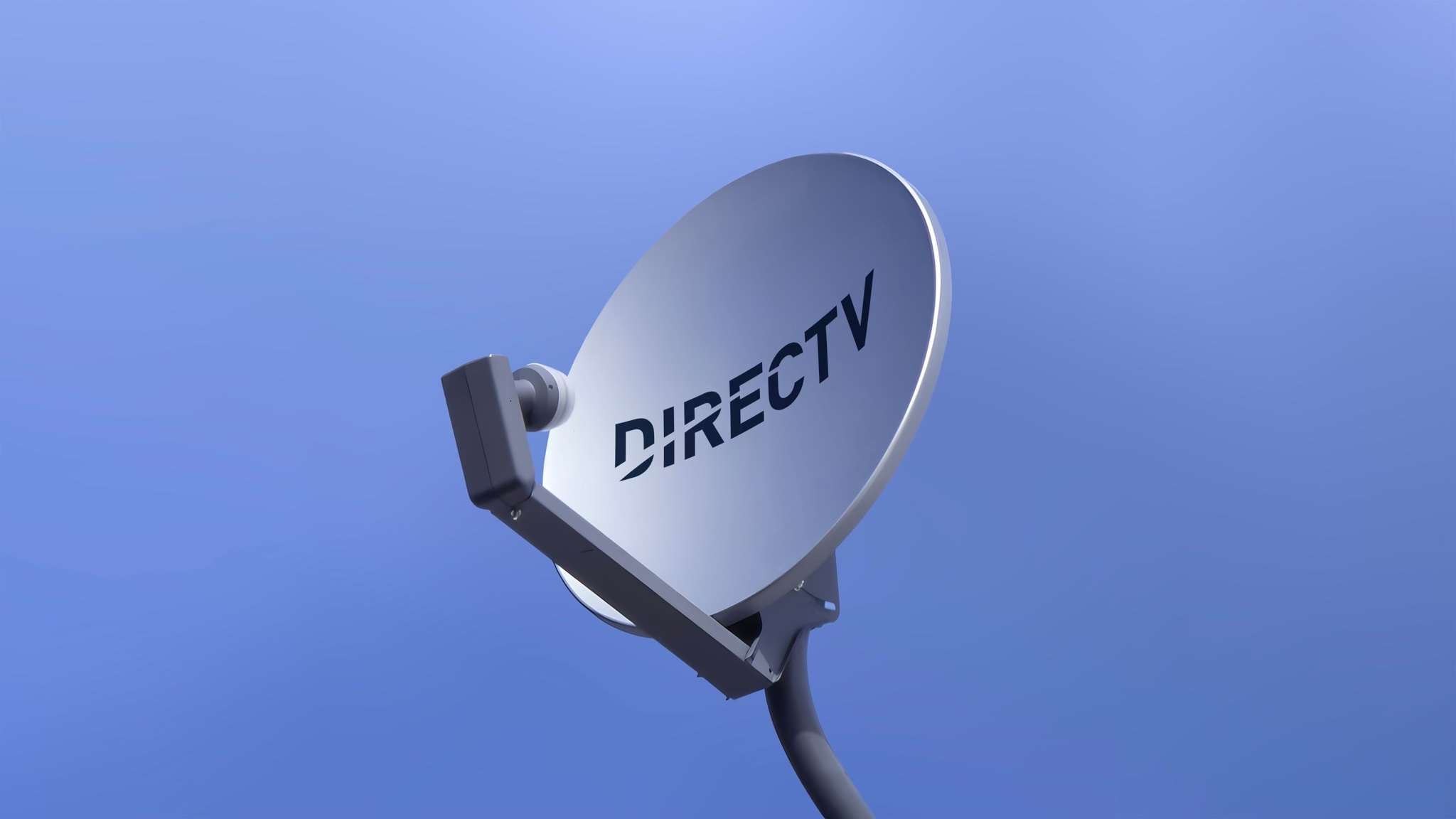
- Formerly: The DirecTV Group, Inc. (2004–2015)
- Type: Subsidiary
- Traded as: NYSE: DTV (2004–2007); Nasdaq: DTV (2007–2015)
- Industry: Multichannel video programming distributor
- Predecessors: USSB; PrimeStar
- Founded: June 17, 1994; 32 years ago
- Headquarters: El Segundo, Los Angeles County, CA, United States
- Areas served: United States, Latin America and the Caribbean
- Products: Direct-broadcast satellite; Pay television; Pay-per-view; Over-the-top media services
- Owner: In the United States: Hughes Electronics (1994–2004); AT&T (2015–2021); AT&T (70%) (2021-2025); TPG Inc. (30%) (2021-2025); TPG Inc. (2025-present)
- Parent: TPG (US); Werthein Group (via Vrio Corp.)(Latin America)
- Website: www.directv.com

DirecTV, LLC (stylized in all caps as DIRECTV) (Note: Pronounced "Direct TV") is an American video programming distributor based in El Segundo, California. Originally launched on June 17, 1994 by Hughes, its primary service is distributing virtual multichannel video programming as well as satellite services for consumers and businesses in the United States and Puerto Rico. Its primary competitors are Dish Network.

On July 24, 2015, after receiving approval from the Federal Communications Commission and the Department of Justice, AT&T acquired DirecTV in a transaction valued at $67.1 billion.

On February 25, 2021, AT&T announced that it would spin-off DirecTV into a separate entity, selling a 30% stake to TPG Inc., while retaining a 70% stake in the new standalone company. The deal closed on August 2, 2021.

On September 30, 2024, AT&T announced that they would sell their remaining 70% stake to TPG Inc. for $7.6 billion. The sale was completed on July 2, 2025, making DirecTV a wholly owned subsidiary of TPG Inc. and splitting the company off from AT&T for the first time since 2015.

On April 13, 2025, DirecTV announced the end of DirecTV Stream as a standalone brand and merged its content with its regular DirecTV service.

== History ==
=== Hughes Electronics ===
Hughes Electronics logo (1985–1990)

In 1953, Howard Hughes created the Howard Hughes Medical Institute (HHMI), to which he transferred full ownership of Hughes Aircraft. Following Hughes' death in 1976, HHMI was incorporated in 1977, and litigation ensued to determine whether it would be allowed to maintain its interest in Hughes Aircraft. In 1984, the court appointed a new board for HHMI, which proceeded to sell off Hughes Aircraft to General Motors on December 20, 1985, for an estimated $5.1 billion. General Motors then merged Hughes Aircraft with its subsidiary Delco Electronics to create Hughes Electronics Corporation.

=== USSB ===
Stanley E. Hubbard founded United States Satellite Broadcasting (USSB) and was a leading proponent for the development of direct-broadcast satellite service in the United States. HHMI and other companies believed in the early 1990s that technology would soon make digital satellite television affordable.

In the 1990s, Hubbard teamed up with Thomson Consumer Electronics and Hughes Electronics to come up with a practical digital satellite service capable of 175 channels; Hughes Electronics created DirecTV as a separate division and secured an agreement with USSB to build and launch the first high-power direct-broadcast satellite system.

Direct satellite broadcasters were mandated in 1992 to set aside 4% of its channel space for noncommercial educational and informational programming. DirecTV selected C-SPAN, EWTN and the Trinity Broadcasting Network from its current channel lineup, plus additional proposals from other programmers. DirecTV selected an additional six channels for the mandate: Clara+Vision, Inspirational Life, NASA TV, PBS YOU, StarNet and WorldLink TV.

The USSB and DirecTV programming services were launched on June 17, 1994. (The service had been test-marketed in a limited number of areas preceding the national launch.)

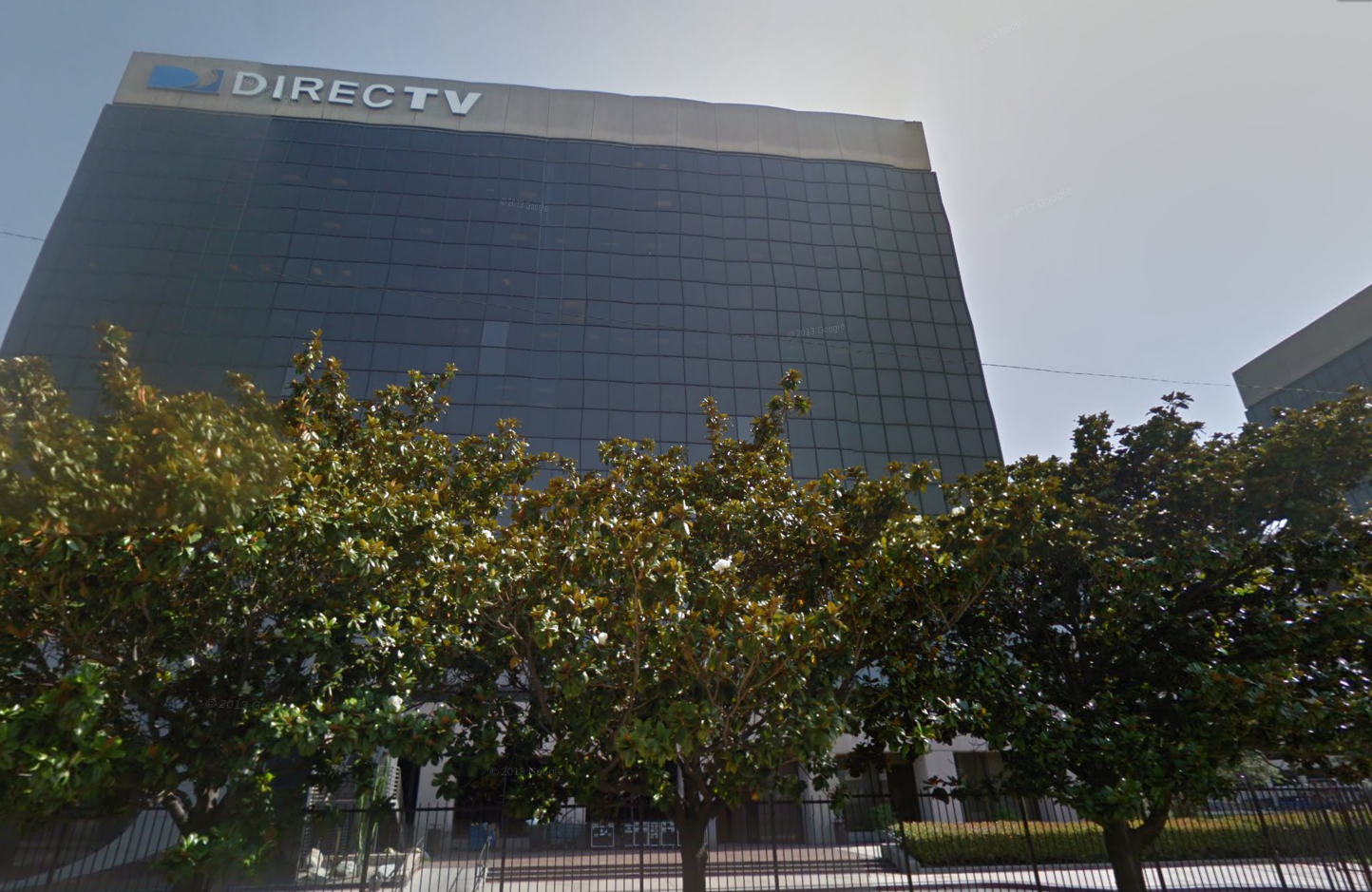
Headquarters in California in 2013

=== DirecTV ===
DirecTV soon began to expand after its initial launch; in December 1998, DirecTV acquired USSB for $1.3 billion, and combined the two satellite services. In 1999, DirecTV acquired PrimeStar, a competitor in the satellite television industry, for $1.83 billion, dramatically increasing its share of the satellite television market in the US.

On January 31, 2004, Hughes announced its intent to focus solely on its satellite television operations and divest its other interests, renaming itself The DirecTV Group, Inc. on March 16, 2004, and changing its ticker symbol from "HS" to "DTV". In April of that year, it sold its controlling interest in PanAmSat to a private consortium led by Kohlberg Kravis Roberts for $3.53 billion. On April 22, 2005, DirecTV spun off Hughes Network Systems into a separate entity and sold 50% of the new entity to SkyTerra, acquiring $157.4 million in the transaction. DirecTV later sold its remaining 50% share in Hughes Network Systems to SkyTerra for $100 million.

On November 1, 2005, DirecTV made its foray with its first original series, CD US, on Freeview. In December 2005, the U.S. Federal Trade Commission imposed a $5.3 million penalty on DirecTV for its violations of federal telemarketing regulations. It was the largest civil penalty the FTC had ever announced in a case enforcing any consumer protection law.

In September 2008, consumers filed a class action lawsuit with the Los Angeles Superior Court to stop DirecTV's practice of charging early cancellation penalties to subscribers. A motion for a preliminary injunction was filed to block the company from automatically removing the fees from customers' bank accounts or charging their credit card accounts without their prior knowledge and written consent. In 2009, the Washington Attorney General's office filed a civil complaint against DirecTV, finding that the company allegedly engaged in numerous repeated violations of the state's Consumer Protection Act. Violations included: unclear rebate terms and conditions, unfair advertisement, and automatically extending customer contracts.

On February 9, 2010, DirecTV dropped Sirius XM Radio and replaced the channel lineup with Sonic Tap audio stations. On April 1, 2011, DirecTV announced it would be renaming its three Fox Sports Networks channels as Root Sports.

The case brought by Washington state was settled in December 2010, with DirecTV agreeing to pay over $1 million. DirecTV subsequently settled a similar suit with the other 49 states and the District of Columbia for $13.25 million.

In July 2012, DirecTV had a major contract dispute with Viacom, leading to channels such as Nickelodeon, MTV and Comedy Central to be taken off the air temporarily In their place, a message appeared on screen reading as follows: "Viacom, the owner of this channel, forced DirecTV to suspend it despite our many requests to keep it on. We are working to bring it back as soon as possible without an unfair increase to your bill. Disruptions like this are brief. Go to DirecTVPromise.com for the latest info." DirecTV executive Derek Chang said to the media "We have been very willing to get a deal done, but Viacom is pushing DirecTV customers to pay more than a 30 percent increase, which equates to an extra $1 billion..." He then said that he couldn't accept Viacom's "extravagant financial demands." Denise Denson, Viacom's Executive Vice President of Content Distribution and Marketing, responded by mentioning how DirecTV refused to speak with Viacom past 11 am. Tuesday, saying that DirecTV's last offer to the company was "lower than anyone else pays us in the industry." The channels were only down for a few days, as contract negotiations were quickly settled after the channels were removed.

On March 11, 2015, the Federal Trade Commission filed a lawsuit against DIRECTV for deceptive advertising. The FTC claimed that DIRECTV failed to properly disclose terms of its TV packages, such as contractual obligations and premiums.

On March 1, 2016, AT&T announced plans for several DirecTV-branded over-the-top services, including AT&T TV, DIRECTV Mobile, and DIRECTV Preview to be offered under one platform called DirecTV Now. The platform launched on November 30, 2016, and was directly competing against Sling TV. DirecTV was bought under the same umbrella as HBO, Cinemax, Turner Broadcasting System, Warner Bros., and Telepictures when AT&T bought Time Warner for over $80 billion in 2016.

In January 2022, the Los Angeles Sports & Entertainment Commission announced that DirecTV would serve as Presenting Sponsor of The chairman's Party, a Super Bowl after-party inside SoFi Stadium.

DirecTV completed its national rollout of local PBS member stations in February 2022. Nearly 250 local PBS stations in 198 Nielsen DMAs were added that reach 99% of all U.S. TV homes.

In February 2023, DirecTV presented and sponsored the third annual American Cornhole League (ACL) Pro Shootout Series, where Tyler Lockett represented DirecTV. DirecTV launched a brand campaign, "Overly Direct Spokesperson," starring Brian Cox in April of that year; this was part of its new brand strategy platform, "Entertainment Without Compromise".

DirecTV launched its satellite-free "For the Birds" streaming brand campaign, featuring Henry Winkler and Steve Buscemi, in February 2024. Deion Sanders joined the marketing campaign in August 2024.

MyFree DirecTV, a free streaming service, was launched in November 2024. MyFree DirecTV provides access to the FAST platform as well as an On-Demand library for free with commercials. The service is available on DirecTV Gemini devices, Amazon Fire TV, Apple TV, Roku, and Google TV.

DirecTV MySports, a streaming sports bundle, officially launched in January 2025; the new Genre Pack offers 40 live channels and ESPN+ that do not require a satellite TV subscription. It secured rights to channels owned by the former partners in Venu Sports and Comcast's NBCUniversal, plus the broadcast rights to the major US sports leagues such as the NFL, NBA, NHL, and MLB as well as major collegiate conferences. Other national sports channels available through DirecTV MySports include: ACC Network, Big Ten Network, ESPN, ESPN2, ESPNU, Fox Sports 1, Fox Sports 2, Golf Channel, SEC Network, TBS, TNT, TruTV, and USA Network.

In February 2025, DirecTV launched additional Genre Packs, a live TV streaming subscription where users can select from multiple programming options based on the types of content consumers prefer. As of April 2025, there are four Genre Pack options available: MyEntertainment, MyNews, MySports and MiEspañol. Consumers of any Genre Pack also gain access to 100+ channels available through MyFree DirecTV.

In March 2025, DirecTV announced the launch of MyHome Team including RSNs. MyHome Team is available to MySports customers and features locally available live sports and in-market games from 37 professional franchises in the U.S. including 12 MLB teams, 15 NBA teams and 10 NHL teams.

DirecTV logo used from 1993 to 2005

==== Ownership ====
On April 9, 2003, News Corporation, the then-parent company of 20th Century Fox (now known as 20th Century Studios) and Fox Television Studios, agreed to purchase a 34% controlling interest in Hughes, including GM's entire share of the company, for $6.6 billion, subject to SEC approval. The FCC voted 3–2 along party lines on December 19, 2003, to approve the deal subject to conditions, forcing News Corp. to agree to arbitration for all disputes with carriers of its media broadcasters, and to provide content through DirecTV neutrally rather than favoring its own networks.

DirecTV logo 2005 to 2011. The "D" symbol was used in some capacity from 1994 until AT&T bought DirecTV in 2015.

On December 13, 2007, DirecTV purchased most of the assets of ReplayTV from D&M Holdings.

News Corporation transferred its 38.5% controlling interest in The DirecTV Group, four regional Fox Sports Net stations, and $550 million cash to Liberty Media in exchange for Liberty's 19% interest in News Corp. The deal, valued at $11 billion, was approved by News Corp. shareholders in 2008.

On May 4, 2009, Liberty announced that it would split off Liberty Entertainment, Inc., and Liberty's 65% interest in Game Show Network, into a separate company to be merged with The DirecTV Group. The merger was completed on November 19, 2009, with The DirecTV Group and Liberty Entertainment becoming subsidiaries of a new company named DirecTV, and PepsiCo executive Michael White as its CEO.

In June 2013, DirecTV purchased Pennsylvania-based LifeShield, a maker of wireless home security systems, with plans to market the systems to its customers.

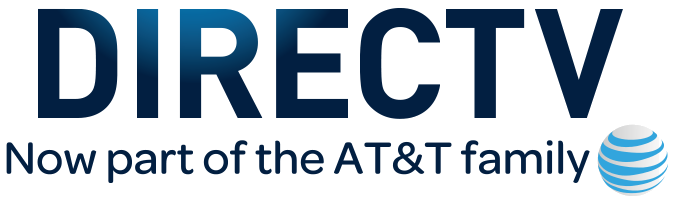
DirecTV transitional logo following purchase by AT&T from July 24 until December 31, 2015

Logo used from January 1, 2016, to August 1, 2021

Logo used in Latin America and the Caribbean since 2018

On May 18, 2014, AT&T announced that it would purchase DirecTV for approximately $67.1 billion. The acquisition was officially approved by the FCC in 2015; it was subject to conditions for four years, requiring AT&T to expand its fiber-optic broadband service to additional customers, public libraries, and schools, and to "refrain from imposing discriminatory usage-based allowances or other discriminatory retail terms and conditions on its broadband internet service".

DirecTV adopted a new logo in December 2015, replacing its previous emblem with that of AT&T. AT&T CFO John Stephens stated that DirecTV's larger subscriber base as a national service gave the service a higher degree of leverage in negotiating carriage deals, thus resulting in lower content costs.

On February 25, 2021, AT&T announced that it would spin-off DirecTV, including satellite, streaming and U-Verse TV, into a separate entity, selling a 30% stake to TPG Inc., while retaining a 70% stake in the new standalone company. The deal closed on August 2, 2021, with Bill Morrow as CEO. Soon after, DirecTV's "Get Your TV Together" ad campaign launched, which featured Serena Williams and cast members of The Real Housewives alongside NFL players.

On September 30, 2024, AT&T announced that they would sell their remaining 70% stake to TPG Inc. for $7.6 billion, splitting the company off from AT&T for the first time since 2015. The sale was finalized on July 2, 2025, completing AT&T's abolition of its television business (excluding U-verse TV) and leaving TPG Inc. with 100% ownership of DirecTV.

On September 30, 2024, DirecTV also announced plans to acquire rival Dish Network from EchoStar with the intent to support the Dish brand for the foreseeable future; however, DirecTV abandoned the deal due to opposition from EchoStar bondholders.

== Logo evolution ==
=== Hughes Electronics era ===
1985–1990

=== DirecTV era ===
1990–1993

1993–2005 (United States), 1997–2000 (Japan), 1996–2004 (Brazil & Latin America), 199?–present (satellite dishes)

2005–2011 (United States & Latin America), 2005–2006 (Brazil), 20??–present (satellite dishes)

2006–2007 (as SKY+DirecTV, Brazil only)

2011–2012 (United States), 2011–2018 (Latin America)

2012–2016

2015–2016

2016–2021

2018–present (Latin America)

2021–present

== Partnerships ==
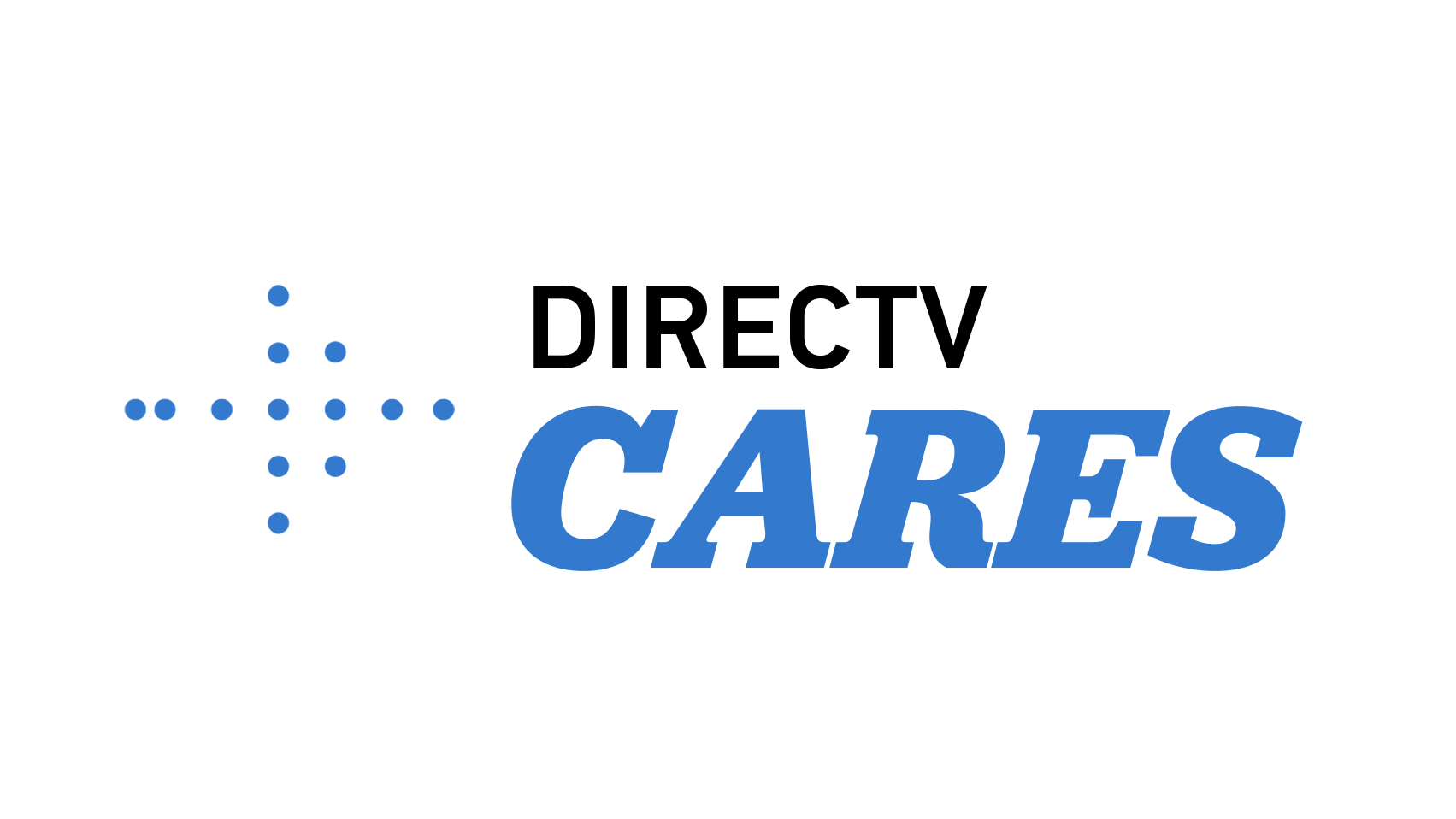
DirecTV Cares logo

On November 11, 1997, DirecTV signed a two-year deal with Action Adventure Network to offer original series and telefilms for pay-per-view viewing, with the intent to expand.

In 2000, DirecTV introduced the first live in-flight television service for airlines; the system was first used by JetBlue and defunct startup carrier Legend Airlines.

Since 2022, DIRECTV has partnered with Ronald McDonald House Charities and its network of local chapters. DirecTV has also partnered with the Hispanic Federation, Kids in the Spotlight, the Los Angeles Sports & Entertainment Commission, and the Plus Me Project.

Yahoo and DirecTV announced an advertising deal in June 2022; under this partnership, Yahoo's omnichannel demand-side platform provided advertisers access to DirecTV's programmatic inventory on linear addressable and connected TV platforms while DirecTV gained access to Yahoo's supply-side platform, making its streaming inventory available across the Yahoo Exchange.

In August 2022, DIRECTV and Amazon Prime announced a multi-year agreement for airing NFL Thursday Night Football games in over 300,000 venues. Amazon Prime holds exclusive rights to TNF games for 12 seasons beginning in 2022. DirecTV is also the national provider of MLS Season Pass, a new subscription service from Apple and Major League Soccer, to commercial establishments such as bars, lounges and restaurants. The offering is known as DirecTV for Business.

Yahoo expanded its partnership with DirecTV advertising to include set-top box data in October 2022.

In June 2023, Southwest Airlines and DirecTV partnered together to support RMHC by providing meals for families staying at the Ronald McDonald House in Dallas, Texas. The same month, DirecTV announced a multi-year renewal of its affiliation agreement with NFL Media that will extend its existing carriage of NFL Network on DirecTV.

In August 2023, Big Ten Network and Big Ten Conference announced a multi-year sponsorship agreement with DirecTV. DirecTV became the exclusive provider of NFL Sunday Ticket across Puerto Rico and the U.S. Virgin Islands in September 2023. DirecTV sponsored the US Baseball Team in the 2023 World Baseball Classic.

DirecTV gained access to A&E Networks' library franchise in 2024 via an initial slate of ten channels, including Lifetime and History Channel. Chicago Sports Network announced that it would provide its network and live local game telecasts for the Chicago Blackhawks, Chicago Bulls, and White Sox through an exclusive distribution agreement with DirecTV.

In January 2025, it was announced that the MLS Season Pass would be available to DirecTV residential streaming customers via a partnership with Apple TV.

Texas Rangers and DirecTV established a multiyear distribution agreement in 2025 for DirecTV to exclusively provide pre-game, post-game, and live game telecasts for Texas Rangers.

== Satellites ==
As of February 2020, DirecTV manages a fleet of 12 satellites in geostationary orbit at positions ranging from 95°W to 119°W, ensuring strong coverage of the North American continent.

== Devices ==
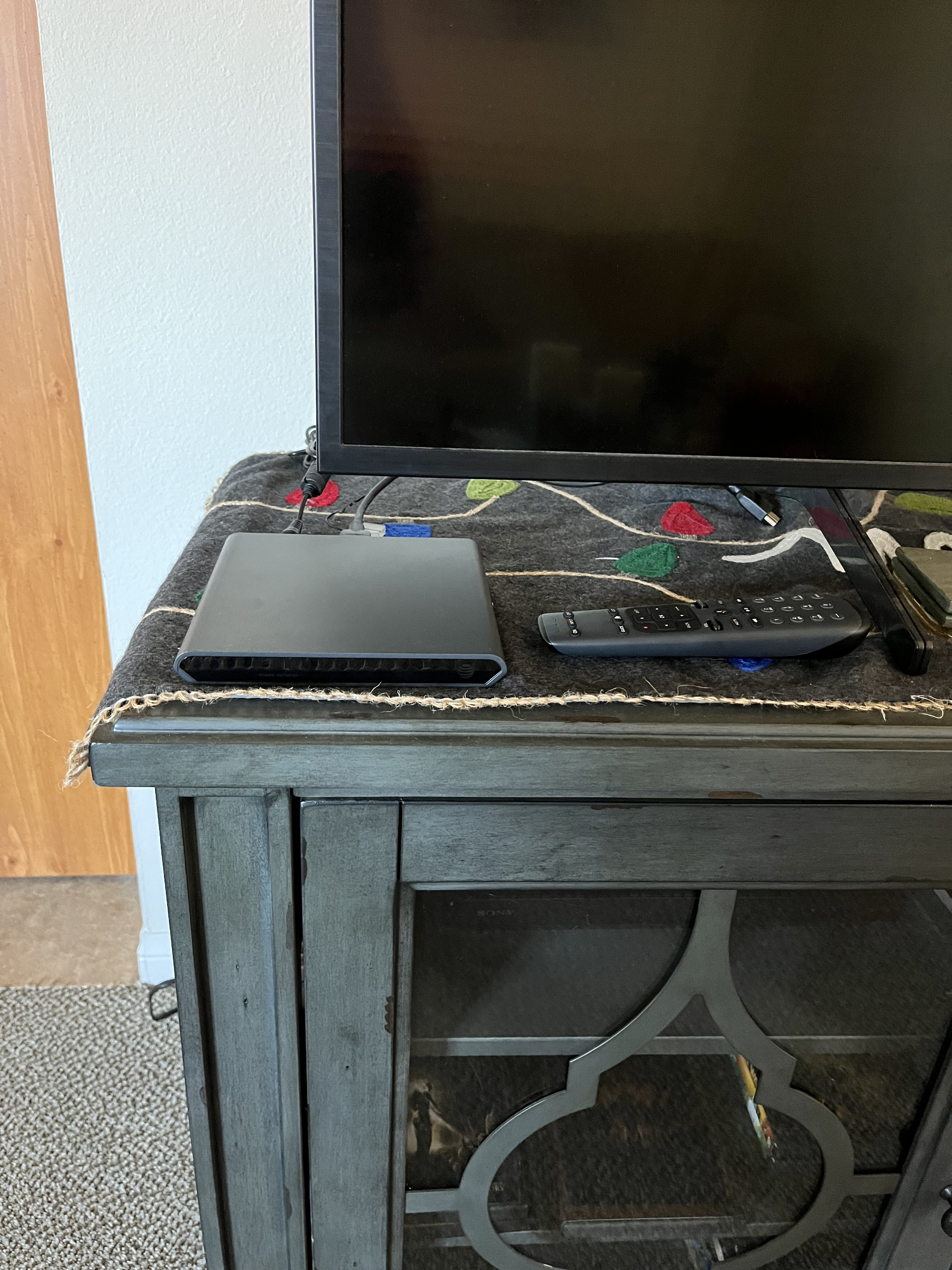
Gemini GP

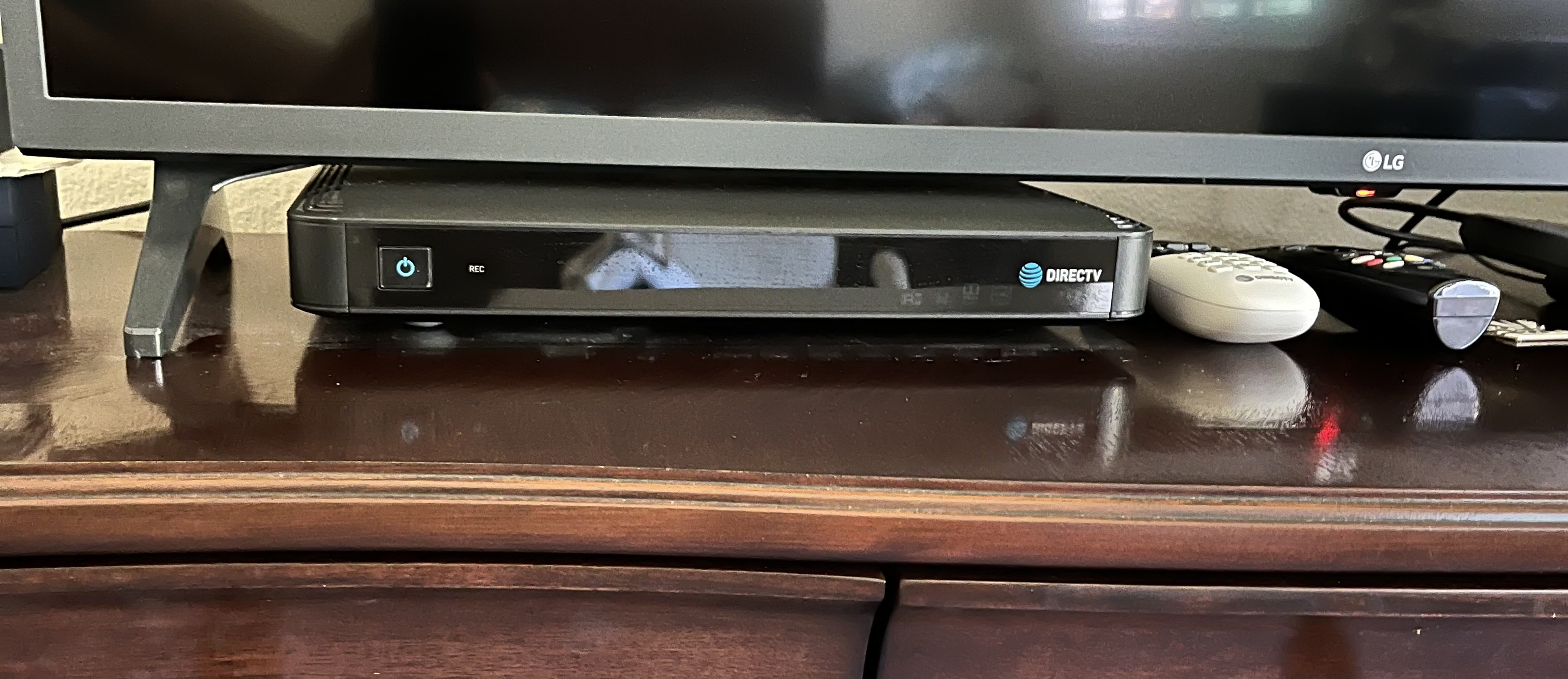
HR54 GP

=== Launch (1994–1998) ===
In the early years of DSS, receivers were manufactured by top electronics brands; initially, receivers were offered under the RCA, ProScan and GE nameplates (all of which were owned or licensed at the time by Thomson of France). Only Thomson initially manufactured receivers as part of their deal with Hughes to develop the DSS system; after June 1995, when 1 million of Thomson's systems had been manufactured and sold, Sony began to sell their own receivers as well, with several other companies (including Hughes themselves, via their Hughes Network Systems unit) waiting in the wings. Features that were innovative at the time included: a fully interactive program guide, parental controls (i.e. allowed parents to passcode protect channels having R-rated content), and pay-per-view (allowing rentals via remote control instead of having to call DirecTV for authorization). The initial generation of antennas was 18-inch diameter (46 cm) with a single feed (consisting of a feedhorn and LNB electronics) that could downlink digital television signals from DirecTV's satellites at the 101 degrees West geostationary orbital position. During this era and into the 2000s, receivers could be purchased from electronics retailers like Circuit City and department stores such as Sears, and a self-installation procedure was possible (with both RCA and Sony creating their own self-installation kits, complete with instructional videotapes).

=== Locals era and HD (1999–2003) ===
DirecTV receiver modifications accommodated local channels, including multi-orbital slot reception and an improved electronic program guide featuring TV listings up to two weeks. The first locals-era DirecTV outdoor antenna was a follow-up generation with a 18x24-inch diameter (46x61 cm) elliptical reflector and three feeds that additionally allowed "multi-sat" reception from DIRECTV satellites at the 119W and 110W positions. By this time, Samsung Electronics, Philips, Panasonic, Mitsubishi Electronics, and Toshiba were providing receivers in addition to RCA, Sony and Hughes.

DirecTV launched new network components dedicated to HD channels. The new network components allowed DirecTV to address challenges with customers experiencing different user interfaces depending on the brand of DirecTV receiver they used, by specifying a "common user experience." DirecTV's designs were built with companies including Pace Micro Technology of Britain, LG of South Korea (which had manufactured boxes under the LG and Zenith Electronics names) and Thomson.

DirecTV's initial satellites used Ku band frequencies. With the launch of new satellites using Ku band frequencies, DirecTV increased its available signal bandwidth more than six-fold to meet the requirements of the higher resolution HD television pictures. DirecTV also maintained its original fleet of satellites in operation at 101W, 110W and 119W longitudes and simulcasted the SD and HD versions of channels once made available. These new DirecTV HD channels required an H20/HR20 or later model set top box capable of supporting the MPEG-4 standard for HD programming. These models also introduced HDMI support for HDTVs with an HDMI port. A new "Slimline" outdoor antenna design was introduced, capable of receiving both the Ka Band satellites located at 99W and 103W longitude as well for a total of 5 LNBs. Over time, DirecTV has consolidated HD programming onto solely the 99W, 101W and 103W slots allowing for the use of a Slimline antenna having 3 LNBs instead of 5.

=== Genie (2008–2013) ===
Video On-Demand (VOD) features were enabled, allowing a viewer to "start over" a program, "look back" at a program that had recently aired, watch prior episodes that weren't presently aired, and see advertising according to that viewer's characteristics. "Whole-home" viewing allowed viewers to access and view their DVR recordings from any room in the house, not just the room where the DVR receiver was located.

In 2012, DirecTV launched its "Genie" family of receiver models, consisting of a "Genie" home server and "mini Genie" devices. Having 5 satellite tuners, the Genie offered live viewing of up to four channels while simultaneously recording a program on a fifth channel. Up to eight mini-Genies could be installed in a home, however simultaneous live viewing was possible on any four of the devices (including the Genie itself).

In addition, DirecTV integrated WiFi wireless home networking to connect set-top boxes to broadband services. DirecTV incorporated RVU remote user interface technology, allowing a single DirecTV receiver to transmit both video/audio and user screen direction to compatible television sets. DirecTV also developed capabilities to "download and go" DVR recordings ("GenieGo") and to stream recordings to devices while out of home.

=== 2014–present ===
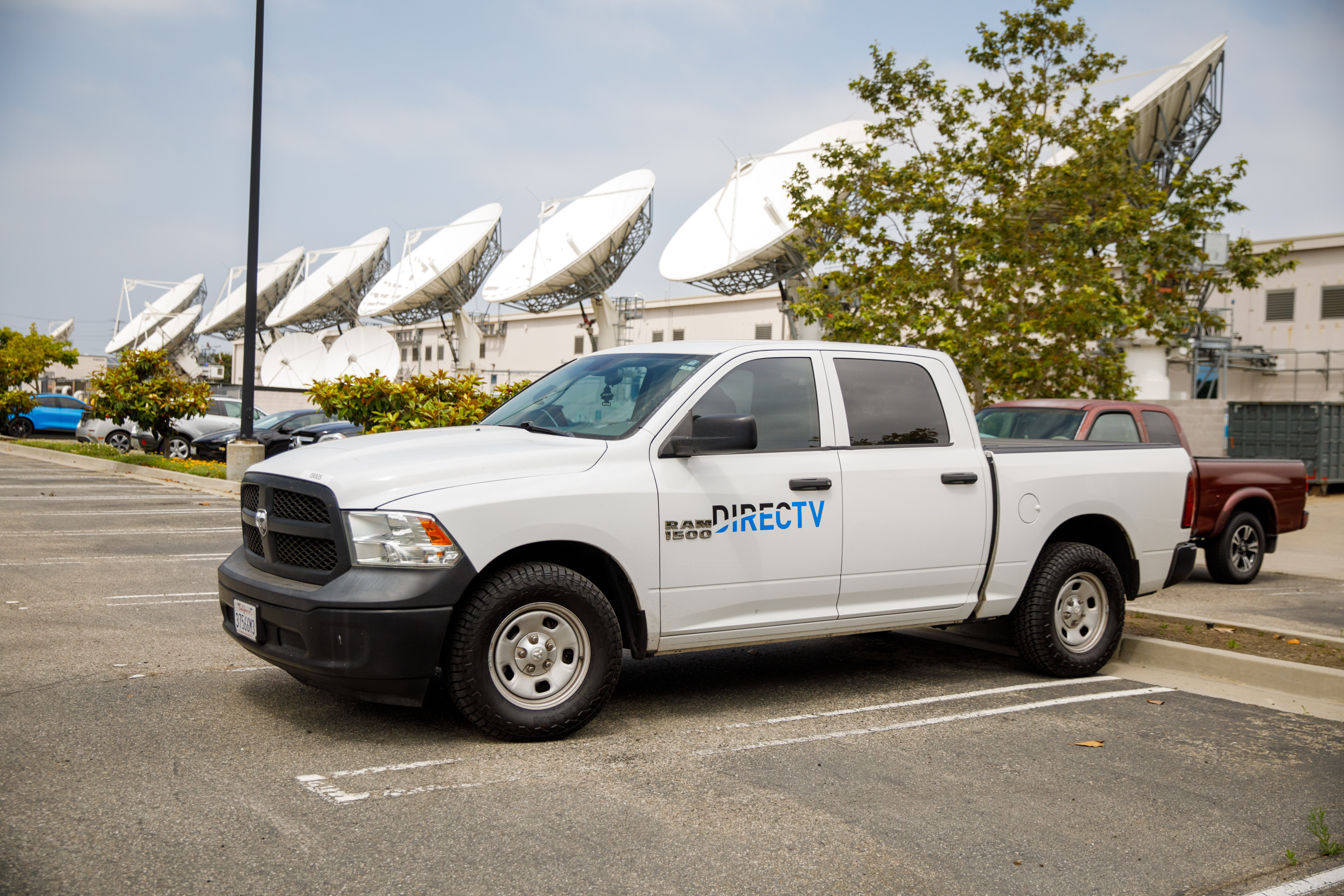

DirecTV introduced limited 4K UltraHD and High Dynamic Range broadcasts. The first nationwide 4K UltraHD broadcasts were made available by DirecTV, and DirecTV offered large sporting events in the format as well as PPV movie rentals and 4K channels. The 4K capable DirecTV miniGenie client (model C61K-700) also became available.

A "Genie 2" device, HS17, was introduced in 2017 that added more satellite tuners and integrated the WVB functionality.

DirecTV began delivering broadband-only services requiring no DirecTV branded equipment whatsoever. Under its new owner AT&T, mobile-device-only television packages were developed (i.e. WatchTV). Model C71KW became available in 2019 to customers of over-the-top (OTT) streaming service.

In 2023, DirecTV released Gemini, a set-top box based on Android TV hardware; it is distributed in two versions, with one relying solely on OTT services, and a second designed to also function as a client for the Genie system. It is designed to aggregate live TV and OTT content in a singular interface.

Gemini Air, a compact pendant and integrated voice remote that provides access to 4k content streaming, was released in August 2023.

== Access card history ==
DirecTV transmits programming with encryption to mitigate signal piracy. The receiver (also known as an IRD, or "integrated receiver-decoder") uses ISO/IEC 7816 smart cards which tell the receiver how to decrypt the programming for viewing. In a continuing effort to combat piracy, an access card generation is created approximately every two years, superseding the old set. DirecTV is now using the fifth generation of access cards.

- P1, also known as F cards, were used until 1997. F cards have a picture of a satellite and the DSS logo on the front.
- P2, also known as H cards, were introduced in 1996 and eventually replaced F cards. H cards look the same as F cards. H cards were in use until 2002.
- P3, also known as HU cards, were introduced in 1999 and were used until April 2004. HU cards have a picture of a football player, a basketball, a clapperboard, and a film canister on the front. HU cards originally shipped with receivers with serial numbers above 0001 700 000. These were removed from circulation because piracy plagued the system.
- P4 cards were introduced in 2002 and are currently still in use. P4 cards are labeled "Access Card: 4."
- D1 cards were introduced in 2004 following compatibility problems with the P4 cards in some receivers. These cards can be identified by the silver edges, and simply bear the word "DirecTV" on the front (no number). Usually found on DirecTV TiVo Series 2 DVRs (DirecTiVos), the D10 and H10 series receivers.
- D2/P12 cards were introduced in 2005. D2 cards can be identified by a two-toned blue dot pattern resembling the DirecTV logo in addition to the DirecTV logo and the words "DirecTV Access Card," while the P12 card has a picture of a satellite on the front. The P12 card is the only card that will work with R15, H20, and HR20 series receivers.
- O cards are the current "standard issue" card. They can be identified with the words "Now part of the AT&T family."

DirecTV has battled with an active signal piracy underground for many years. One infamous event that temporarily hampered pirates was known as 'Black Sunday', which took place one week before Super Bowl Sunday in 2001. Hackers saw a string of software updates starting in late 2000 which each contained a few innocuous bytes. However, when the innocuous bytes from all those updates were combined, they became code that searched for and destroyed 98% of hacked smart cards and then wrote the text "GAME OVER" to the first 8 bytes of the hacked cards memory. Hacks continued after that event.

== High-definition television (HDTV) ==
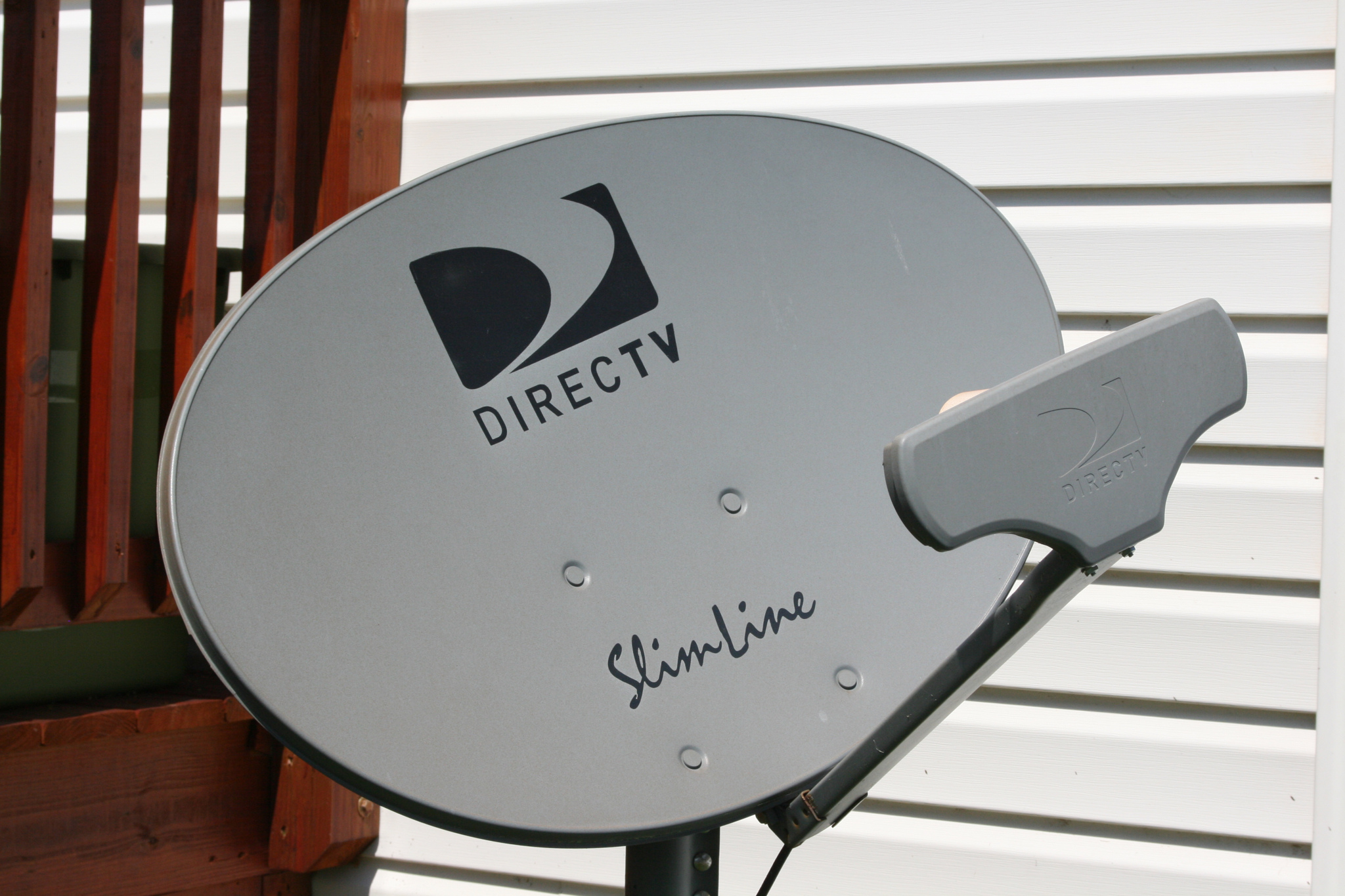
DirecTV AU9-S 3-LNB "Slimline" satellite dish

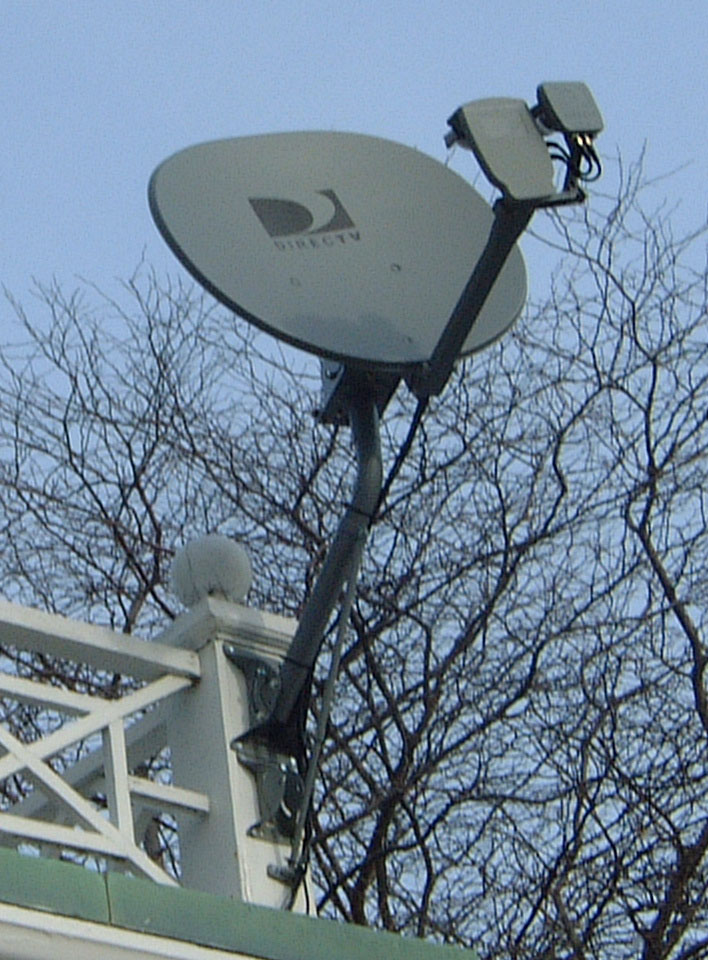
DirecTV AT-9 5-LNB "Sidecar" satellite dish

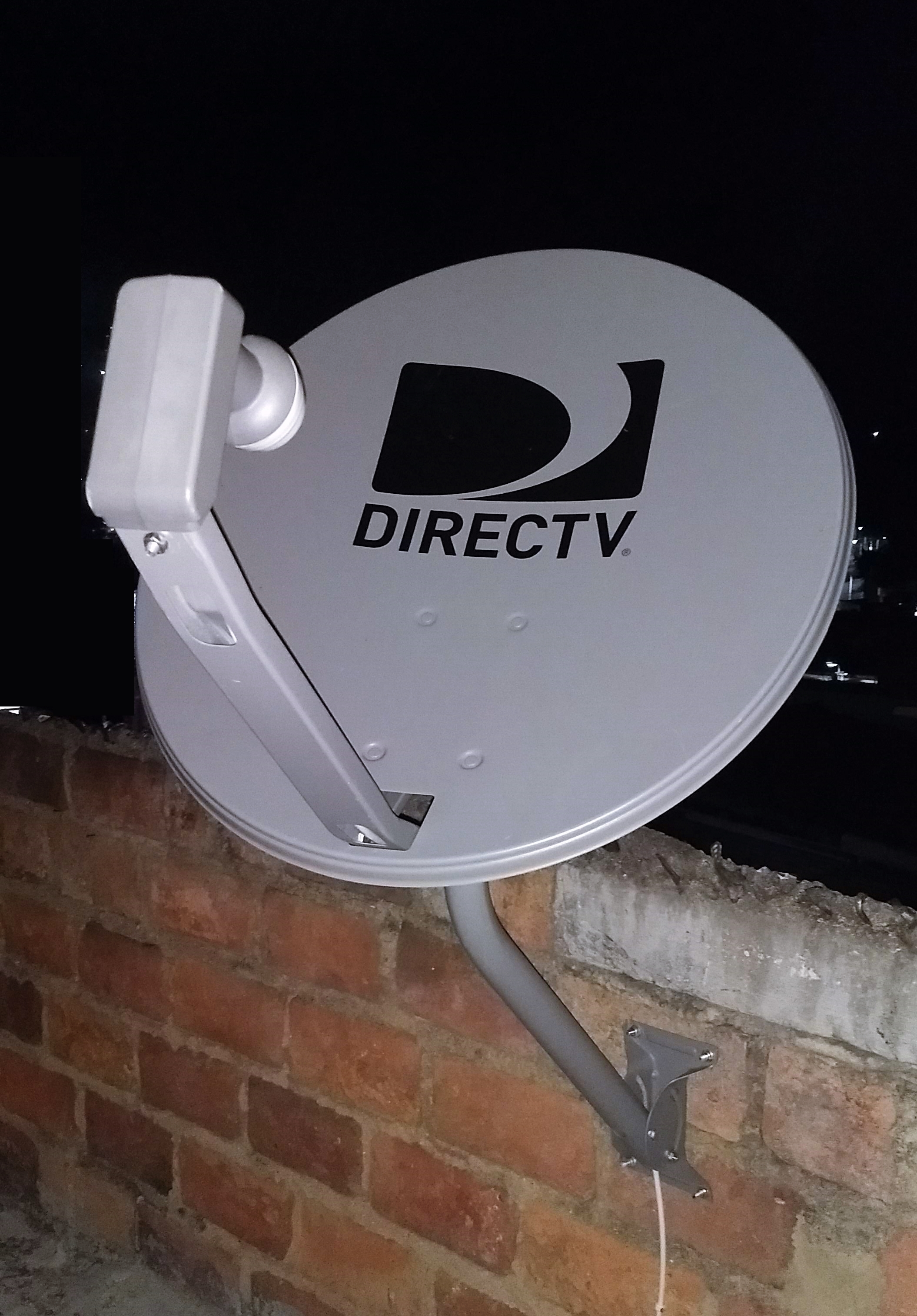
DirecTV WNC SF6 Gray HD 2-LNB "Round" satellite dish, used only in Latin America and the Caribbean

Like its competitors, DirecTV offers high-definition television (HDTV) and interactive services.

To handle the proliferation of bandwidth-intensive HDTV broadcasting, DirecTV rebroadcasts local HDTV stations using the H.264/MPEG-4 AVC codec while employing a newer transmission protocol (DVB-S2) over the newer satellites. This allows the service to transmit high-definition television faster over satellite signal than was previously feasible using the older MPEG-2 compression and DSS protocol.

Receiving channels encoded in MPEG-4 requires newer receivers, such as the H20 as well as the 5-LNB K_{a}/K_{u} dish. Contracts such as Pace Micro Technology, LG Electronics and Thomson have manufactured MPEG-4 receivers for the company. Pace developed the DirecTV Plus HD DVR (Model HR20-700, and HR21-700), LG Electronics the Model H20-600 receiver, and Thomson the Model H20-100 and HR20-100 DVR receivers.

DirecTV has admitted to software issues with some of the H20 receivers and HR20 DVRs, which have been plagued with problems since they were released in mid-2006.

== 4K television ==
In November 2014, DirecTV became the first television provider to begin offering 4K ultra-high definition content. On launch, 4K content was limited to renting a small library of on-demand films, downloaded to the subscriber's Genie DVR (some 4K content can also be pre-loaded automatically to the set-top box via the Genie Recommends feature). The 4K service could also only be used on "DirecTV 4K Ready" televisions, which support RVU protocol; this was limited to selected Samsung 4K televisions released in 2014.

In 2015, DirecTV introduced 4K Genie Mini set-top boxes, which can be connected to any HDMI 2.0/HDCP 2.2-compliant devices to provide 4K video.

In April 2016, DirecTV began live sports broadcasts in 4K to eligible subscribers, including coverage from the 2016 Masters Tournament, 25 MLB Network Showcase baseball games in the 2016 season (subject to local blackout restrictions) beginning April 15, 2016, and all Notre Dame college football home games during the 2016 season.

== Programming ==
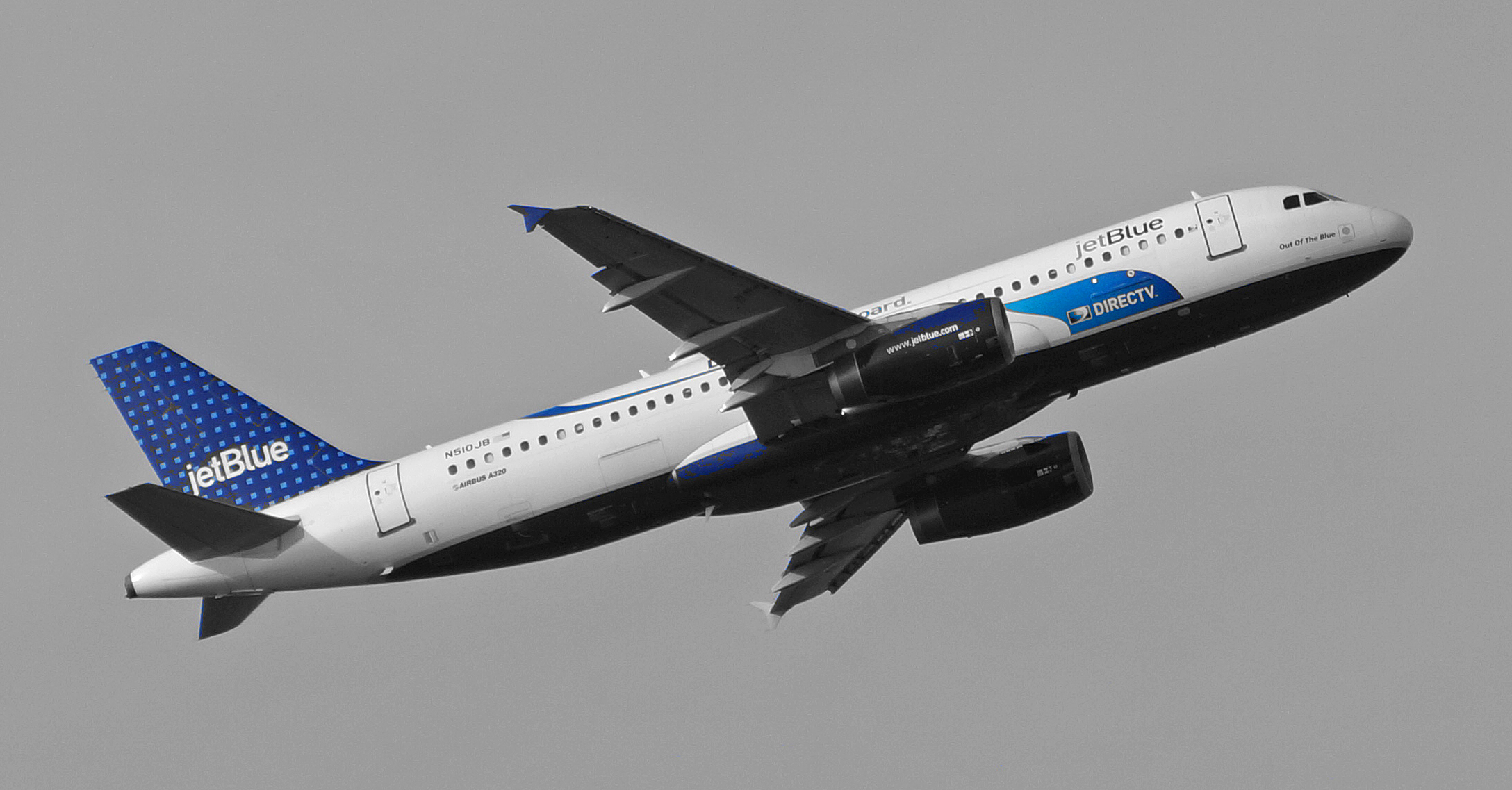
JetBlue promotes DirecTV on board Airbus A320 N510JB "Out of the Blue."

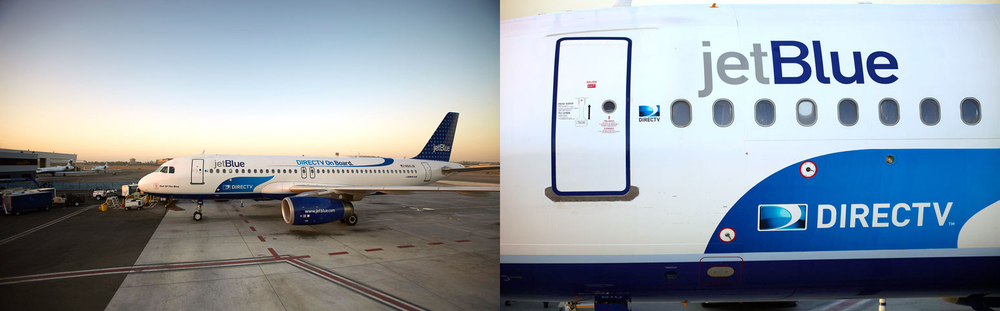
DirecTV on board a jetBlue plane

DirecTV's exclusive general entertainment channel Audience Network broadcasts dozens of original and acquired programs. The channel ceased operations in 2020. Separately, DirecTV had its own exclusive 3DTV channel, n3D, that launched in 2010 and was shuttered in 2012.

DirecTV serves American Airlines, Delta Air Lines, JetBlue, Southwest Airlines, and United Airlines.

DirecTV offers movie and special event programming through the DirecTV Cinema service; originally a pay-per-view service (with programs purchased either over the phone, or via remote if a phone line was connected to the DirecTV receiver), advances in technology have enabled DirecTV to expand the format into a video on demand service; access to this service requires an internet connection.

=== DirecTV for Business ===
Starting with the launch of its bars and restaurants unit in the 1990s, DirecTV has become an alternative for commercial establishments to show sports games under license by streaming services. This provides a loophole in the streaming providers' terms of service that normally prohibit their use in commercial establishments where the business makes money. In addition, these establishments do not have to reconfigure their systems to accommodate a streaming-only platform.

Beginning in 2021, DirecTV for Business became an exclusive provider of ESPN+ for Business, which carries limited live sporting events that are otherwise streamed on an ESPN+ consumer account. This package is sold directly by Joe Hand Promotions. On August 23, 2022, Amazon and DirecTV for Business entered into a multi-year carriage agreement to broadcast Thursday Night Football only to business customers at no extra cost. In 2023, DirecTV for Business signed an exclusive deal with Apple TV+ to broadcast MLS Season Pass and Friday Night Baseball, which both packages include in-market and out of market teams from each respective league, to its business customers only. Later in 2023, it was also announced that DirecTV for Business would retain the rights to NFL Sunday Ticket for business customers only. This service was extended in 2026 through new multi-year terms, with DirecTV for Business handling sales, marketing and nationwide distribution of EverPass’ commercial rights portfolio.

In 2023, DirecTV for Business deployed its first satellite receiver, the H26K.

In July 2024, DirecTV for Business announced a new next-generation set-top box as part of its Advanced Entertainment Platform, which delivers a mix of live TV, app-based, and on-demand content.

== Marketing ==
Beginning in 2006, DirecTV began a series of commercials in which characters from popular movies and television shows break the fourth wall to tout the service's picture quality and the number of channels available in high definition. Instead of using CGI, the original actors normally reprise their roles on recreated sets, and resulting footage is mixed with the original scenes. The productions are recent and appeal to DirecTV's "male-oriented marketing message." These characters include Captain Kirk (William Shatner, Star Trek VI: The Undiscovered Country), Bill Harding (Bill Paxton, Twister), The Economics Teacher (Ben Stein, Ferris Bueller's Day Off), Dr. Emmett Brown (Christopher Lloyd, Back to the Future), Burton Guster (Dulé Hill, Psych), C.J. Parker (Pamela Anderson, Baywatch), Rick "Wild Thing" Vaughn (Charlie Sheen, Major League), Beyoncé (Upgrade U music video), Nadia (Shannon Elizabeth, American Pie), Turtle (Jerry Ferrara, Entourage), Ellen Ripley (Sigourney Weaver, Aliens), Steve Freeling (Craig T. Nelson, Poltergeist), Annie Wilkes (Kathy Bates, Misery), Mini-Me (Verne Troyer, Austin Powers in Goldmember), The Girl in the Ferrari (Christie Brinkley, National Lampoon's Vacation), Daisy Duke (Jessica Simpson, The Dukes of Hazzard), T-1000 (Robert Patrick, Terminator 2: Judgment Day), Ann Darrow (Naomi Watts, King Kong), Hellboy (Ron Perlman, Hellboy), Richard Hayden (David Spade, Tommy Boy), The Black Eyed Peas ("Meet Me Halfway" music video), Christina Aguilera ("Keeps Gettin' Better" music video) and Honey Hornee (Kim Basinger, Wayne's World 2). Also in the series of commercials Don't be like this, Rob Lowe were Peyton Manning, Eli Manning, Tony Romo, Andrew Luck, Randy Moss and Archie Manning promoting NFL Sunday Ticket, and Dale Earnhardt Jr. promoting NASCAR Hot Pass. Cartoon characters have also been used in the ads, beginning with Scooby-Doo and the Mystery, Inc. gang. Recent commercials have also featured model Hannah Davis and a "talking" horse.

DirecTV during that time also ran a series of ads that take shots at cable television's service (or lack of service). Beginning in March 2010, they did a spoof of the classic game show To Tell The Truth with Alex Trebek hosting the show. The series of commercials both pays homage to the Goodson-Todman game show and take shots at both cable and DirecTV's archrival Dish Network, who later sued for false advertising. Another series of commercials, promoting the 2010 NFL Sunday Ticket package of all-football programming, featured neighbors committing uncivil acts to neighbors who watched the "wrong" football team. One spot had a woman leaving a snack platter for a neighbor on which the food spelled out "DIRT BAG"; another showed a dog trashing a neighbor's property; yet another showed an on-duty policeman knocking on a DirecTV customer's door, stunning him with a taser and leaving him passed out in his open doorway. In August 2011, Deion Sanders began appearing in DirecTV's ads for NFL Sunday Ticket, urging people to switch from cable. These ads originally claimed NFL Sunday Ticket is now "free" for new customers for one year with a subscription to their Premiere package and a two-year contract. In response, on August 4, 2011, Comcast sued DirecTV for false advertising. Comcast dropped the case on August 19, 2011, after DirecTV altered the ads to remove the word "free", changing it to "at no extra charge".

=== DirecTV blimp ===
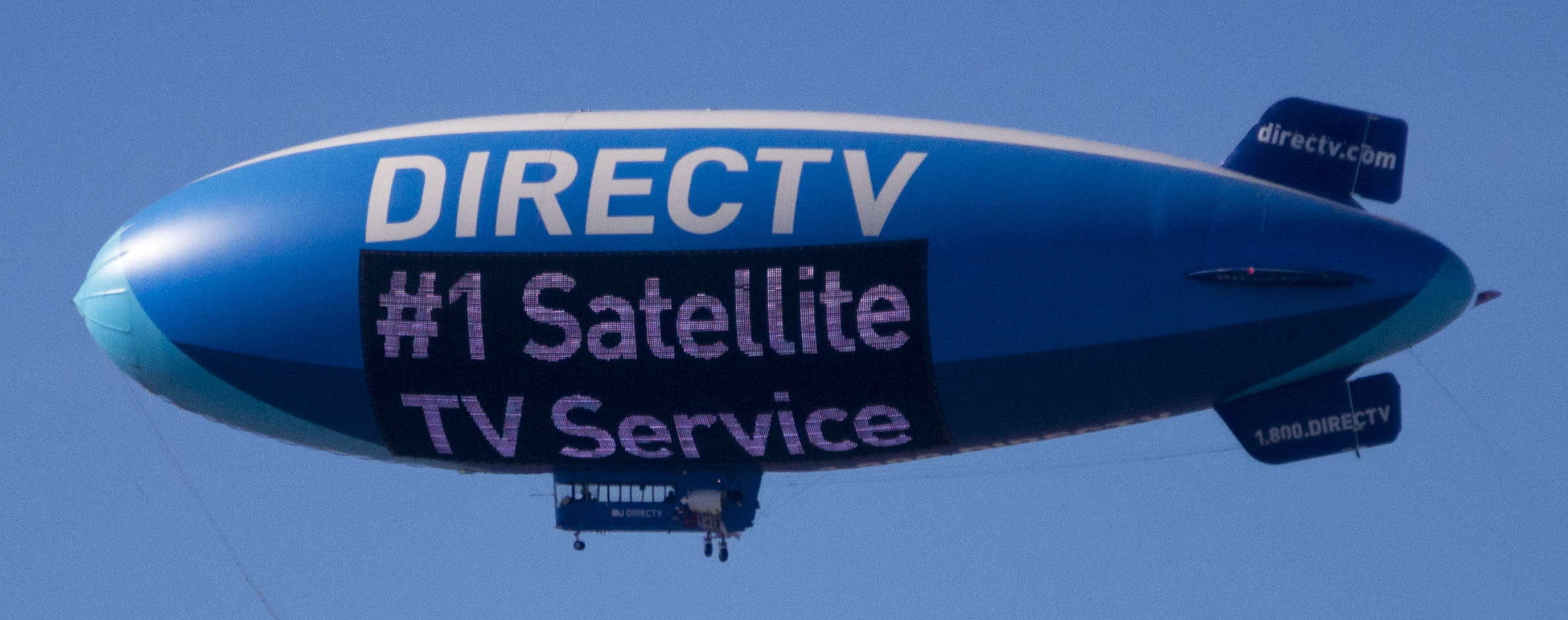
DirecTV blimp flying over West Las Vegas during the Consumer Electronics Show 2015

The DirecTV blimp named "lefty" was launched in October 2007 at the MLB World Series in Boston and has been seen all over the United States since its inception. The blimp flies mainly over live sporting events but has also been seen at other entertainment and charitable venues. This second-generation A-170LS Video Lightsign Lightship features a state-of-the-art video screen that displays full-color video images day or night. This lightsign, the only one of its kind in the world, is used to display messaging and advertising for DirecTV. The blimp has been recently spotted on Twitter as followers track the journeys of the blimp from one event to another. The airship is owned and operated by The Lightship Group, an advertising company based in Orlando, Florida.

== Customer service ==
Year	Subscribers
1994	320,000
1995	1,200,000
1996	2,300,000
1997	3,301,000
1998	4,458,000
1999	6,679,000
2000	9,554,000
2001	10,218,000
2002	11,181,000
2003	12,290,000
2004	13,000,000
2005	15,000,000
2006	15,950,000
2007	16,830,000
2008	17,620,000
2009	18,081,000
2010	19,200,000
2012	19,900,000
2014	20,265,000

DirecTV was awarded a J.D. Power award for residential cable and satellite TV customer satisfaction in 2007.

DirecTV's customer service is provided by many third-party owned call centers both inside and outside the United States. Most of the call centers are contracted to provide agents to answer customer phone calls regarding programming, billing, or technical questions.

As of November 2012, DirecTV does not offer a 30-day grace period for those who wish to try the service. "If you do not fulfill your Programming Agreements, DirecTV may charge a pro-rated fee of up to $480."

=== Better Business Bureau review ===
In August 2008, The Boston Globe reported that DirecTV received 20,000 complaints in less than three years to the Better Business Bureau on DirecTV slipping in cancellation fees.

In August 2010, the BBB reported that it had received 39,000 complaints against DirecTV in the previous three years, and the BBB gave it an F (failing) grade. Many of the complaints concerned DirecTV's early termination fees, billing and service issues.

== Cable TV and Satellite internet partner(s) ==
=== Cable Internet ===
- Astound Broadband
- Blue Ridge
- Blue Stream
- Midco
- Sparklight
- Spectrum
- TDS Telecom
- Xfinity
- Xtream

=== Satellite Internet ===
- Amazon Leo
- Viasat

=== Fiber Internet ===
- Astound Broadband
- Blue Ridge
- Fidium Fiber
- FiOS
- Fioptics
- Kinetic
- Midco
- TDS Telecom

=== Fixed Wireless ===
- Verizon

=== xDSL ===
- EarthLink

== International operations ==
- Sky PerfecTV! – sold to SKY Perfect JSAT Corporation
- DirecTV Latin America – renamed Vrio in 2018, sold to Grupo Werthein
- Sky Brasil – sold to Grupo Werthein
- Sky México – sold to Televisa

== See also ==
- High-definition television in the United States
- Out-of-market sports package
