= Micaela Riera =

Argentine actress and model

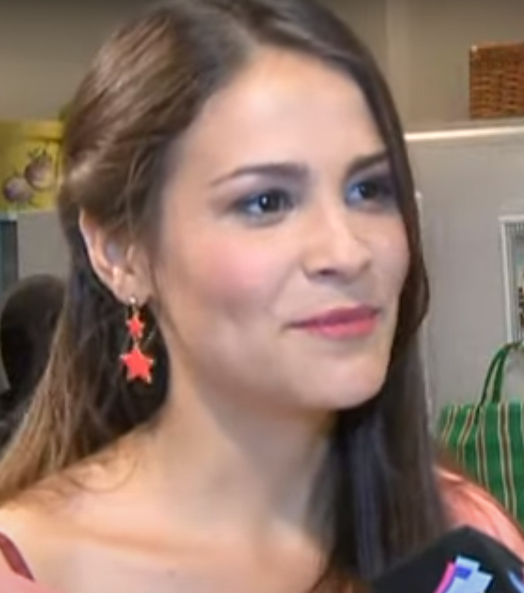
- In 2013
- Born: María Micaela Riera; 18 July 1991 (age 35); Santa Fe, Argentina
- Occupations: Actress, model

María Micaela Riera (born 18 July 1991) is an Argentine actress and model. She is known for her roles in Consentidos (2009–2010), Señales (2013–2014), and El amor después del amor (2023).

== Professional career ==
Riera began her career as a model at age 14, as part of the Pancho Dotto agency. In 2009, at age 17, she got the role of Valentina in the youth telenovela Consentidos, broadcast by El Trece. In 2011, she made a special appearance as Marisa in the Disney XD series Peter Punk. She also had an appearance in the telenovela Cuando me sonreís, broadcast by Telefe. That same year, she starred in the play Atlántida, un mundo bajo el mar, along with Thiago Batistuta, directed by Alicia Zanca and Nicolás Perez Costa.

In 2012, Riera appeared in the TV series 30 días juntos and Graduados. The following year, she got the role of Lorena in the series Aliados. However, she left the production for another project. She went on to star in the Televisión Pública youth series Señales, in which she played Catalina "Cata" Pertichelli. In 2016, she co-starred in the short film Los últimos días de Betina Ruiz and appeared as a guest star in the telenovela Educando a Nina, from Telefe. She was also one of the protagonists of the play Sincronizadas at the Teatro Porteño.

Next, she appeared in the comic telenovela Fanny la fan (2017), and joined the cast of the second season of the Nickelodeon children's series Heidi, bienvenida a casa, where she played the role of Sofía. In turn, she portrayed a notary in the play Amoricia, which premiered at the Teatro Porteño. In 2019, Riera joined the cast of the Telefe series Atrapa a un ladrón, in which she played Diana Sapojnic, and starred in the short film Calycera, playing the titular princess.

In 2020, Riera starred in the play Dobles de riesgo, directed by Josefina Pieres at the Microteatro. In 2021, she was signed to join the cast of the film Los bastardos, directed by Pablo Yotich. In 2022, it was announced that she had been chosen to play the singer Fabiana Cantilo in the Netflix series El amor después del amor, which portrays the life of Fito Páez.

In 2023, she joined the cast of the play El divorcio at Multiteatro.

== Filmography ==
=== Films ===
Year	Title	Role
2013	Planeta globalizado	Top Model
2016	Los últimos días de Betina Ruiz (short)	Camila
2019	Calycera	Calycera
2023	Los bastardos	

=== TV series ===
Year	Title	Role
2009–2010	Consentidos	Valentina
2011	Peter Punk	Marisa
2011	Cuando me sonreís	
2012	30 días juntos	Luna
2012	Graduados	Malena
2013	Aliados	Lorena
2013–2014	Señales	Catalina "Cata" Pertichelli
2016	Educando a Nina	Herself
2017	Fanny la fan	
2017	Heidi, bienvenida a casa	Sofía
2019	Atrapa a un ladrón	Diana Sapojnic
2022	El encargado	Marina
2023	El amor después del amor	Fabiana Cantilo
2026	Moria	young Susana Giménez

=== Music videos ===
Year	Title	Artist
2017	"Mañanas sin sol"	Leonardo Centeno

== Theater ==
Year	Title	Role	Theater
2011	Atlántida, un mundo bajo el mar	Sluvis	
2016–2017	Sincronizadas		Teatro Porteño
2017	Amoricia	Escribana	Teatro Porteño
2020	Dobles de riesgo		Dobles de riesgo
2023	El divorcio	Mercedes	Multiteatro
