= Eva De Dominici =

Argentinian model and actress (born 1995)

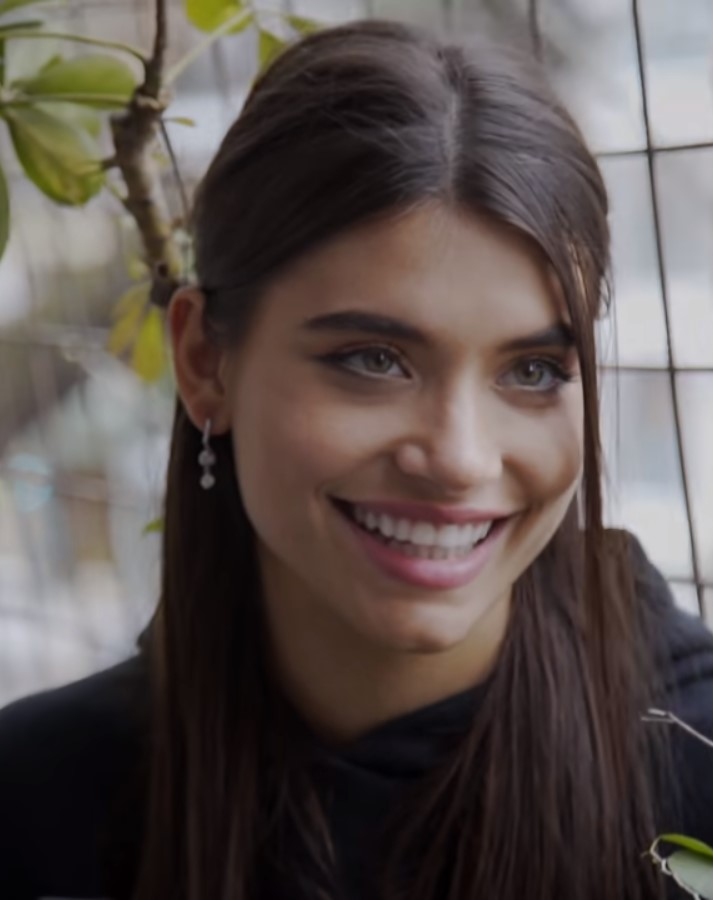
- De Dominici in 2020
- Born: Eva Carolina Quattrocchi; April 21, 1995 (age 31); Avellaneda, Buenos Aires, Argentina
- Other name: Eva De Dominici
- Occupations: Model and actress
- Years active: 2005–present
- Height: 1.69 m (5 ft 6 1/2 in)
- Partner(s): Joaquín Furriel (2016–2018); Eduardo Cruz (2018–2025)
- Children: Cairo Cruz (b. 2019)

Eva Carolina Quattrocchi (born April 21, 1995), better known as Eva De Dominici, is an Argentine model and actress. She was born in Avellaneda, Buenos Aires, Argentina.

== Early life ==
In a TV interview, Eva De Dominici said she had an accident in her childhood which damaged her teeth, and she was bullied for her separated teeth by her classmates. Up until at least 2016, she lived with her parents. In March 2016, she began a relationship with the actor Joaquín Furriel, from whom she separated in 2018. In 2018 she began a relationship with Eduardo Cruz, brother of Spanish actress Penélope Cruz. On October 6, 2019, they became parents for the first time of a boy whom they named Cairo Cruz in Los Angeles, California. They separated in 2025.

== Career ==
De Dominici began her acting career in 2005, after being a model. She is known for her villainous role in Los ricos no piden permiso.

== Filmography ==
=== Film ===
Year	Movie	Character	Director
2015	El encuentro de Guayaquil	Olivia	Nicolás Capelli
2016	Sangre en la boca	Déborah	Hernán Belón
2016	La última fiesta	Guadalupe	Leandro Mark and Nicolás Silbert
2018	You Shall Not Sleep	Bianca Aguilar	Gustavo Hernández
2018	Sangre Blanca	Martina	Bárbara Sarasola-Day
2019	Ji	Tiffany	Ben Griffin
2021	Cosmic Sin	Juda Sayle	Edward Drake
2024	The Uninvited	Delia	Nadia Conners
2025	Forge	Talia	Jing Ai Ng
2025	Homo Argentum	Ana	Gastón Duprat and Mariano Cohn
2026	Balls Up	Emilia	Peter Farrelly

=== Television ===
Year	Title	Character	Channel
2006	Chiquititas Sin Fin	Micaela Cortés	Telefe
2007–08	Patito feo	Tamara	Canal 13
2009–10	Consentidos	Gal	Canal 13
2011	Peter Punk	Yael	Disney Channel
2011	Cuando toca la campana	Paola	Disney Channel
2011	Dance!	Gala Redondo	Canal 10
2012–13	Dulce Amor	Lola Rodríguez	Telefe
2014	Somos familia	Pilar Miranda	Telefe
2014	Camino al Amor	Valentina Rossi	Telefe
2016	Los ricos no piden permiso	Josefina Mansilla de Villalba	Canal 13
2017	La fragilidad de los cuerpos	Verónica Rosenthal	Canal 13
2018	Pasado de Copas: Drunk History	Victoria Ocampo	Telefe
2018	Golpe al corazón	Rita	Telefe
2019	The Soviet Sleep Experiment	Dra. Anna Antonoff	Amazon
2020	Hawaii Five-0	Maria	CBS
2021	Maradona: Blessed Dream	Lorena Gaumont	Amazon
2022–2024	The Cleaning Lady	Nadia Morales	Fox

== Theater ==
Year	Title	Character	Theater
2006	Chiquititas Sin Fin	Micaela "Miki" Cortés	Teatro Gran Rex

== Awards ==
Year	Award	Category	Program	Result
2014	Fans Awards	Bomba del Año	Herself	Nominated
2016	Notirey	Female Revelation	Los ricos no piden permiso	Winner
2016	Sur Awards	Female Revelation	Sangre en la boca	Nominated
2017	Premios Martín Fierro	Best Actress in Miniseries	La fragilidad de los cuerpos	Winner
2017	Notirey	Best Performance Star in unit	La fragilidad de los cuerpos	Nominated
2017	Tato Awards	Best Leading Actress	La fragilidad de los cuerpos	Nominated
