= Brenda Asnicar =

Argentine actress and singer (born 1991)

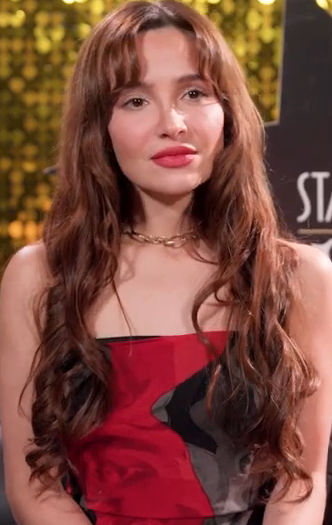
- Asnicar in 2026
- Born: 17 October 1991 (age 34); San Isidro, Argentina
- Occupations: Actress; singer; dancer; songwriter; record producer; model
- Years active: 1999–present
- Musical career
- Genres: Pop; teen pop
- Instruments: Vocals; piano; guitar
- Labels: EMI Music; Sony Music

Brenda Asnicar (born 17 October 1991) is an Argentinian actress and singer who gained international popularity for her debut role as Antonella Lamas Bernardi in the Disney Channel television series Patito Feo.

== Life and career ==
=== 1991–2009: Early life and career beginnings ===
Asnicar was born in San Isidro, Argentina, the daughter of Gustavo Asnicar and Adriana Mendoza. Asnicar has stated that she is also of Venezuelan and Italian ancestry. She has one brother, Iván, and her religion is Roman Catholicism. During her childhood Brenda studied at the Italian Cultural Centre school in Villa Adelina, where she learned to speak fluent Italian.

Asnícar made her television debut on the children's program Cantaniño in 1999, when she was 8 years old. In 2003 at age 12 she began working on the TV show Chicos Argentinos.

Asnícar debuted as a singer on albums for Cataniño and Chicos Argentinos. These albums were a commercial success in Argentina and numerous other countries, most notably Italy.

=== 2007–2009: Patito Feo ===
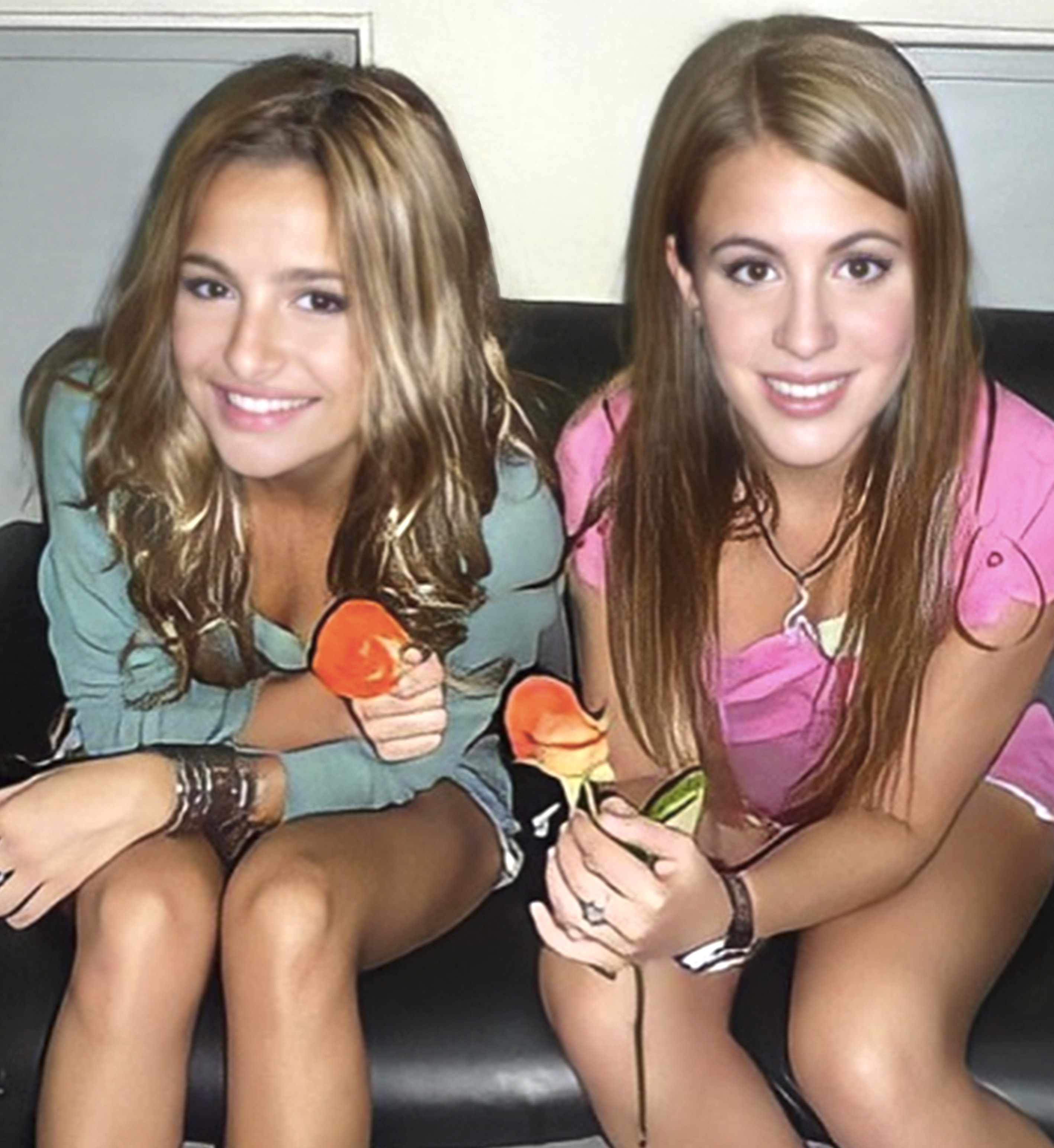
The stars of Patito Feo: Brenda Asnicar (l.) played antagonist Antonella Lamas Bernardi, while Laura Natalia Esquivel (r.) played the title role of Patricia "Patito" Díaz-Rivarola Castro (2006)

In 2006 Asnícar landed her first leading role on television, as Antonella Lamas in Patito Feo (Ugly Duckling) (2007–09), also created by Marcelo Tinelli and produced by Ideas del Sur. It became one of the most popular adolescent television programs in Latin America, Europe and Asia. The series aired on Disney Channel between July 2007 and March 2011, becoming a global phenomenon.

The music of Patito Feo resulted in five studio albums, of which four were certified platinum and one was certified gold by the Argentine Chamber of Phonograms and Videograms Producers. Patito Feo won a Premios Carlos Gardel and three nominations for Carlos Gardel Awards.

=== 2009–2016: Breakthrough with Sueña conmigo ===
From 2009 to 2011 Asnícar starred in the series Sueña Conmigo. The series earned high ratings and was a huge success in Latin America, Spain, and Italy. In 2011, the cast toured Argentina, Latin America, and Italy, performing songs from the series.

In 2011 she starred in the series Los únicos with María Eugenia Suárez and Nicolás Cabré in El Trece and under production of Pol-ka.

Since January 2012 Asnicar had starred the Telemundo series Corazón valiente (Fearless Heart), along with Adriana Fonseca, Ximena Duque, José Luis Reséndez and Fabián Ríos, as Fabiola Arroyo, one of its leading characters.

In 2016 Asnicar previewed The B Collection with mcma London; the collection launched on 10 February 2016.

From 2013 2015 Asnícar landed the role of Juana Carbajal series Cumbia Ninja, which achieved international success. She also became a member of successful music group Cumbia Ninja in the series, along with Ricardo Abarca.

In 2016 Asnicar starred on Por amarte así, a new television series by Claudio Lacelli, opposite Gastón Soffritti, Catherine Fulop and Facundo Gambandé.

== Personal life ==
In 2017 Asnicar married Alejandro de Angulo, a Colombian engineer with whom she had been in a relationship since 2013. They later divorced in 2019.

== Filmography ==
=== Television ===
Year	Title	Role	Notes
2001–03	Cantaniño	Herself	Guest star
2004	Chicos Argentinos	Herself	Guest star
2007–08	Patito Feo	Antonella Lamas Bernardi	Main antagonist; 155 episodes
2010–11	Sueña Conmigo	Nuria Gómez	Main role
2012	Los únicos	Keira Beltrán	Main cast
2012	Corazón valiente	Fabiola Ferrara / Fabiola Arroyo	Main role
2013–15	Cumbia Ninja	Juana Carbajal / Nieves Páez	Main role
2016	Por amarte así	Mercedes Olivetti	Main role
2022	¿Quién es la máscara?	Luz, the firefly	23rd unmasked

== Discography ==
=== Studio albums ===
- 2019: Vos Sos Dios
