= Tomas Ross (actor) =

Argentine actor and YouTuber

Tomás Ross
- Born: Tomás Francisco Ross; March 1, 1999 (age 27); San Isidro, Buenos Aires
- Occupation: Actor/Content Creator
- Years active: 2006 - present
- Height: 165 cm (5 ft 5 in)

Tomás Francisco Ross (March 1, 1999, Buenos Aires) is an Argentine actor and YouTuber. He is best known for his role on the Cris Morena television series Casi Ángeles playing Cristobal Bauer.

== Recent years ==
He is currently working as a content creator, scriptwriter, and video editor, both for his personal social media and for others. One example is “El Carpetazo de la Semana”, a segment he scripts, which is posted on the social media accounts of Marilú, a libertarian influencer.

In 2019, he was part of the cast of Sintonía Pop, an infantile-youth musical, along with great artists such as Belén Pouchan, Paula Amoedo and Bianca Dipasquale. Tomás played the role of Franco, a very funny boy and the gallant of Sintonía Pop, the musical school of which it is a part.

== Career ==
Tomás, who also spends a lot of time communicating with his followers on his personal Instagram, began his television career working on Alma Pirata (2006), playing Nicolás Vázquez in his childhood, with whom he later returned to work in Casi Angeles (2007–2008), carrying out the role of Cristobal, Nicolás' little son, and also formed part of 51 functions in the Teatro Gran Rex with the cast in 2007. Then, he continued working for Ideas del Sur in Consentidos (2009–2011), taking the role of Benjamín, a very flirtatious boy and the small gallant of his school. In 2011, he made an appearance on Peter Punk, a program broadcast on Disney XD. Tomás acted in multiple TV programs broadcast on TV Pública, Programs for which he has recently publicly exposed contractual irregularities by the Argentine government, such as "La Viuda De Rafael" (2012), "C.A.P.O.S" (2012–2013) and "El Mal Menor" (2015–2016).

In recent years, Tomás has focused on theater and social media production, starting with Mauo, un amigo espacial (2018), a children's musical in which he played Ramiro, the evil antagonist of the school, doing 16 shows at the Ludé theater in winter season. He has been involved in the advertising campaign PEGAMENTE by Voligoma, contributing to its promotion and visibility.

== Its beginnings ==
Before taking his step on TV, Tomás advertised for national and international brands, such as Celusal, Danonino, Cif, and in other countries; Germany ( Knorr), France, Czech Republic and Canada, among others.
