= Patito Feo =

Argentine telenovela (2007–08)

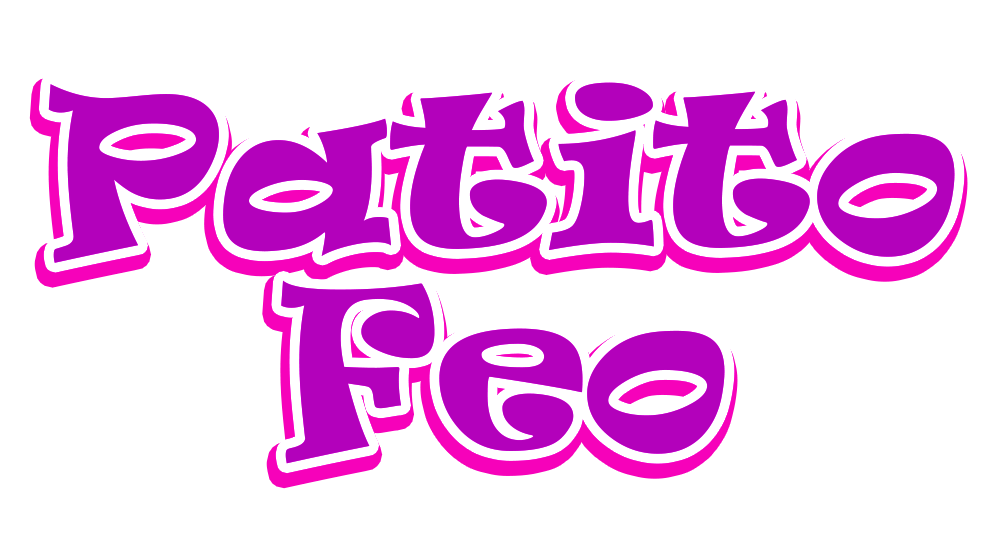
- Genre: Telenovela; Children's television; Teen drama; Comedy drama
- Created by: Alejandro Stoessel; Mario Schajris
- Written by: Esteban Mejia and Marcela Citterio
- Directed by: Jorge Montero
- Starring: Laura Esquivel; Brenda Asnicar; Juan Darthés; Griselda Siciliani; Gloria Carrá
- Theme music composer: Carlos Nilson; Mario Schajris
- Opening theme: "Un rincón del corazón" by Laura Esquivel
- Ending theme: "Amigos del corazón" by Esquivel and Brenda Asnicar
- Countries of origin: Argentina; Mexico
- Original language: Spanish
- No. of seasons: 2
- No. of episodes: 304 (Original); 265 (Censored)

Production
- Executive producer: Leonardo Blanco
- Production companies: Ideas del Sur; Televisa

Original release
- Network: Canal 13
- Release: 10 April 2007 – 3 November 2008
- Network: Disney Channel
- Release: 23 July 2007 – 31 March 2011

Related
- Atrévete a Soñar; Consentidos; Atracción x4 en Dream Beach

Patito Feo is an Argentine children's and teen comedy drama telenovela produced by Ideas del Sur that originally aired on Canal 13 for two seasons, from 10 April 2007, to 3 November 2008. The series centers on Patito, a teenager with exceptional vocal talent who moves from a small town to Buenos Aires. She enrolls in a prestigious performing arts school, where students are divided into two rival groups, Las populares and Las divinas, the latter led by the arrogant Antonella. As she pursues musical success, Patito confronts lookism, intense school rivalries, a love triangle, and the mystery surrounding her biological father's identity.

Created by Alejandro Stoessel, Mario Schajris, and Marcela Citterio, Patito Feo was produced by Ideas del Sur in association with Televisa. It stars Laura Esquivel and Brenda Asnicar, alongside Juan Darthés, Griselda Siciliani and Gloria Carrá, with a large ensemble cast. Following its successful run in Argentina, Disney Channel acquired the series' broadcast rights and aired the show in over 40 countries across the Americas, Europe, and Asia. Despite having received mixed reviews, Patito Feo achieved strong ratings and became an international phenomenon.

Alongside the series, three soundtrack albums and a live album were released, earning multiple certifications across Latin America and Southern Europe and supporting concert tours throughout both regions. In 2007, Patito Feo won the Martín Fierro Award for Best Children's-Youth Program and was nominated in the same category the following year. At the 2008 Gardel Awards, its music recordings received four awards. It was also nominated for the International Emmy Award for Best Children & Young People at the 36th ceremony.

== Plot ==
Patricia, also known as Patito, has to leave her humble life in Bariloche with her mother, Carmen, to move to the big city of Buenos Aires. For health reasons, both travel so Patito can receive the medical treatment that she needs. To Carmen's surprise, the doctor of the hospital will be her unforgettable old love, Leandro, the unknown father that Patito has been waiting to find for years.

Due to her passion for music, Patito joins the Pretty Land School of Arts, where she will meet Antonella, the queen bee of the prestigious private school. Antonella is the daughter of Blanca, who is engaged to Leandro for financial reasons. Antonella is unaware that her family is made up of a group of swindlers, which is why her presumed deceased father is actually in prison in Spain.

Patito and Antonella will have a love-hate relationship. Despite their differences, both share the same dreams: reunite with their respective fathers and became music stars. Two decisive groups would later be formed at the Pretty Land School of Arts: Las Divinas, led by Antonella, and Las Populares, led by Patito, who will compete to win the talent show and sign a record label.

== Cast ==
=== Main characters ===
- Laura Esquivel as Patricia "Patito" Castro
- Brenda Asnicar as Antonella Lamas Bernardi
- Thelma Fardin as Josefina Beltran
- Eva De Dominici as Tamara Valiente
- Gaston Soffritti as Matias Beltran
- Rodrigo Velilla as Felipe Sanchez
- Brian Vainberg as Facundo Lamas Bernardi

=== Recurring characters ===
- María Sol Berecoechea as Sol Démini
- Juan Manuel Guilera as Gonzalo Molina
- Nicolás Zuviria as Alan Luna
- Nicolás Torcanowsky as Santiago Peep
- Camila Outon as Pía Zanetti
- Camila Salazar as Caterina Artina
- Nicole Luis as Luciana Menditegüi
- Andrés Gil as Bruno Molina
- Santiago Talledo as Guido Leinez

== Background ==
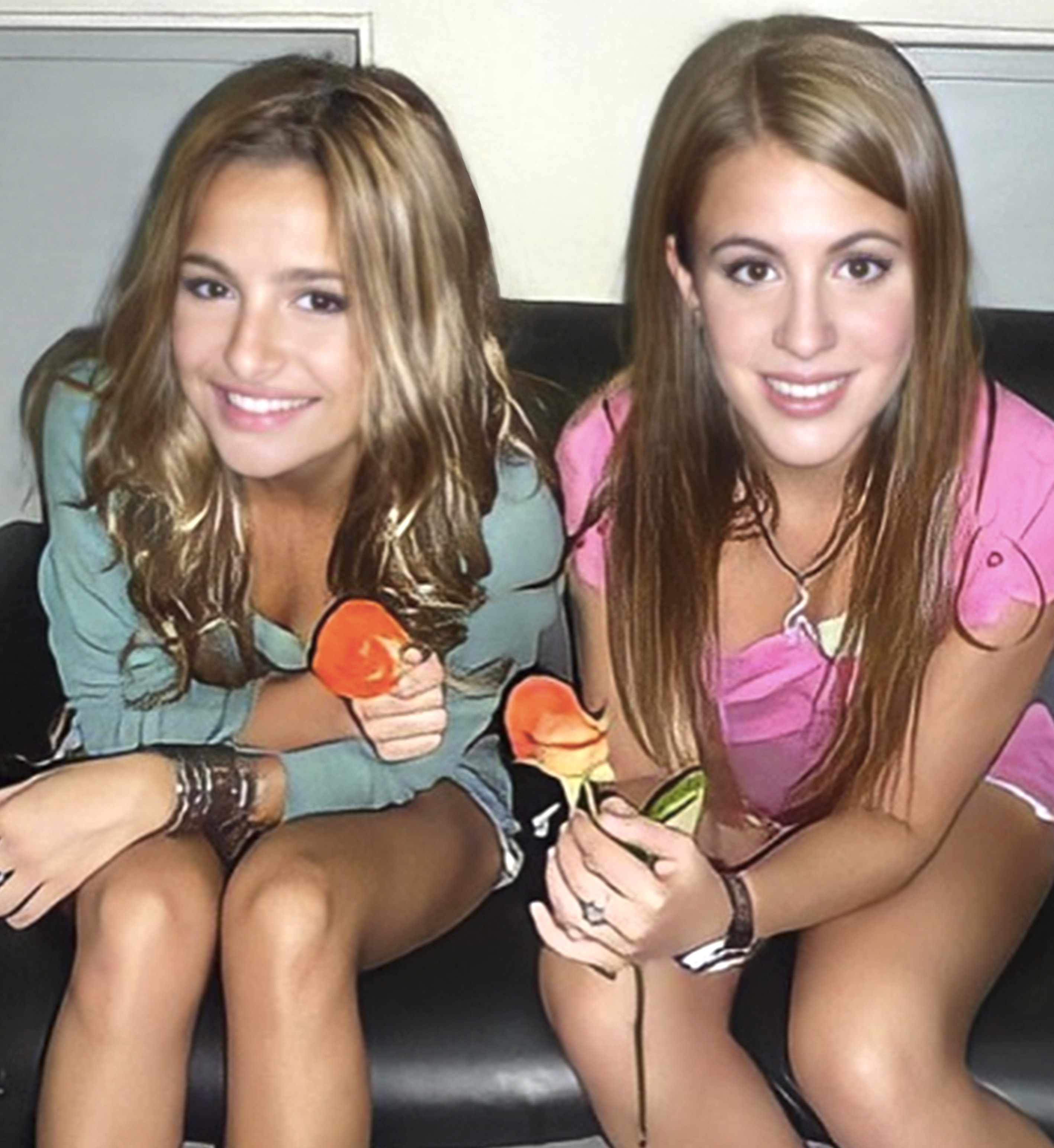
The stars of Patito Feo: Brenda Asnicar (l.) played antagonist Antonella Lamas Bernardi, while Laura Natalia Esquivel (r.) played the title role of Patricia "Patito" Díaz-Rivarola Castro (2006)

The series started filming in 2006 in Buenos Aires. With a huge marketing push, the show started its run in April 2007 in Canal 13. Following the phenomenon it generated in the country, the show started airing internationally by Disney Channel across Latin America, Europe, and Asia under the title Patty’s World, the official title for non–Spanish-speaking countries, translated into their respective languages (Il Mondo di Patty, O Mundo de Patty, Bota e Patit, Le Monde de Patricia, etc.).

It premiered on Disney Channel Latin America on July 23, 2007, on Disney Channel Italy on June 9, 2008, and on Disney Channel Spain on September 14, 2009, and subsequently on the respective national networks of Greece, Cyprus, Israel, Albania, Portugal, France, Turkey, Romania, Belarus, Serbia, the Republic of Macedonia (now North Macedonia), Bosnia and Herzegovina, among others. The series was ultimately broadcast in more than 50 countries, achieving worldwide success.

Patito Feo succeeded in positioning its discography at number one on international sales charts with Patito Feo: La historia más linda (2007), Patito Feo en el Teatro (2007), La vida es una fiesta (2008), and the live album Patito Feo: El musical más bonito (2010), becoming the best-selling soundtracks of the year and certified for 11× Platinum in countries such as Italy, Spain, Greece, Portugal, Argentina, Mexico, and Colombia, among others.

From 2007 to 2011, Laura Esquivel and Brenda Asnicar became Argentina’s leading teen idols of the time, performing for more than two million spectators worldwide during four musical tours. After staging numerous performances at the Teatro Gran Rex in Buenos Aires, Argentina, and serving as opening acts for High School Musical at the Estadio Antonio Vespucio Liberti, the actresses toured countries across Europe and Latin America, performing in venues renowned for their historical prestige. Highlights included Mexico City’s Auditorio Nacional, the Arena di Verona in Italy, the Palau Sant Jordi in Barcelona, Spain, and the Faliro Olympic Indoor Hall in Athens, Greece, among other major arenas, where performances were repeated for up to three consecutive days. Due to high public demand, the respective solo tours of the lead actresses were announced, further solidifying its status among critics as a genuine cultural phenomenon.

The show spawned over 200 international merchandising including a collection of books, bestselling novels and magazines, as well as products such as DVDs, school supplies, clothing (including an exclusive fashion collection at El Corte Inglés between 2009 and 2011), footwear (Cover Your Bones, among other brands), dolls, perfumes, makeup, accessories, board games, electronic toys, collectibles, costumes, and decorative items. Two Patito Feo video games were released by PlayStation. Patito Feo: El juego más bonito was released on November 4, 2010, for the PlayStation Portable (PSP), receiving the award for Best Product of the Year granted by Televisa. SingStar Patito Feo was released on December 3, 2010, for PlayStation 3 and PlayStation 2, compiling the greatest hits from its soundtrack in karaoke format.

In 2008, Patito Feo won the Martín Fierro Award and received a nomination for the International Emmy Award for Best Children & Young Adults program.

Although the show was incredibly well received by the audience, Patito Feo attracted huge criticism due to the fact it glamorized the villains, a group of mean and beautiful girls that called themselves Las Divinas (The Divines). Besides being superficial, Las Divinas were also mean and bullied Patito. The fact the villains were much more popular among young girls than the main character caused concern over some groups and the issue was even on the cover Noticias, Argentina's most important current affairs magazine, under the headline "The Triumph of Discrimination".

== Legal problems ==
In late 2008, Alejandro Stoessel, creator of Patito, was fired. Disagreements between him and the production company started after two shows he was in charge of, the second season of Patito Feo and the teen-oriented show Atraccion x 4, failed to reach expectations and ended up being canceled. After parting ways with the company, he started a lawsuit against Ideas del Sur asking for a part of Patito Feo profits because he claims he was responsible for creating the entire concept. The lawsuit not only was the reason a new leg of a Latin American tour was canceled but also a European tour, where the show was also enjoying huge popularity.

After his dismissal, Alejandro Stoessel was hired by Dori Media to develop a new show targeted to kids and teenagers.

At the same time, Ideas del Sur started to develop a new youth-oriented show, Malcriados (now titled Consentidos), and chose Brenda Asnicar, who had enjoyed high popularity in her role as Antonella, as one of the lead actresses. At the same time, Dori Media and Stoessel wanted her to star in their new show, Ñeka.

Brenda finally decided to do the Dori Media project and, not satisfied with being turned down, Ideas de Sur started a lawsuit against Brenda's management since her contract stipulated she should prioritize Ideas del Sur projects over other production companies.

Finally, Ñeka was renamed Mia, mi Amiga Invisible and will debut at Mipcom in Cannes starring Brenda. But the show is also facing various lawsuits: besides Ideas del Sur, Valeria Britos, the creator of the original script (when it was titled Ñeka), is also suing Dori Media.

The lawsuit prevented the cast, especially Brenda Asnicar, of touring across Europe in 2010 to promote the show.

== International release ==
Country	Language	Channel	Title
Argentina	Spanish	Canal 13 / Disney Channel / Magazine	Patito Feo
Albania	Albanian	Junior TV	Bota e Patit: Historia më e bukur (Patty's World: The most beautiful story)
India	Hindi	Disney Channel	Patito Feo
Turkey	Turkish	D Çocuk / ATV / Nickelodeon / Kidz TV	Patito Feo: En güzel hikaye (Patito Feo: The most beautiful story)
Italy	Italian	Disney Channel / Italia 1 / La5 / Boing	Il Mondo di Patty (Patty's World)
San Marino	Italian	Disney Channel	Il Mondo di Patty (Patty's World)
Greece	Greek	Mega Channel	Patty: Η πιο όμορφη ιστορία (Patty: The most beautiful story)
Cyprus	Greek	ANT1 Cyprus	Patty: Η πιο όμορφη ιστορία (Patty: The most beautiful story)
France	French	Gulli / Cartoon Network / Boing / IDF1	On most channels, an edited version of the first season aired under the title De tout mon Coeur (With All My Heart). The original version only aired on Boing under the title Le Monde de Patricia (Patricia's World). The second season never aired in French speaking-regions.
Belgium	French	Gulli / Cartoon Network / Boing	On most channels, an edited version of the first season aired under the title De tout mon Coeur (With All My Heart). The original version only aired on Boing under the title Le Monde de Patricia (Patricia's World). The second season never aired in French speaking-regions.
Switzerland	French	Gulli / Cartoon Network / Boing	On most channels, an edited version of the first season aired under the title De tout mon Coeur (With All My Heart). The original version only aired on Boing under the title Le Monde de Patricia (Patricia's World). The second season never aired in French speaking-regions.
Luxembourg	French	Cartoon Network / Boing	On most channels, an edited version of the first season aired under the title De tout mon Coeur (With All My Heart). The original version only aired on Boing under the title Le Monde de Patricia (Patricia's World). The second season never aired in French speaking-regions.
Francophone Africa	French	Cartoon Network / Boing	On most channels, an edited version of the first season aired under the title De tout mon Coeur (With All My Heart). The original version only aired on Boing under the title Le Monde de Patricia (Patricia's World). The second season never aired in French speaking-regions.
Portugal	Portuguese	SIC / Panda Biggs	O Mundo de Patty (Patty's World). In Portugal, songs are dubbed in Portuguese.
Spain	Spanish	Cartoon Network / Disney Channel / Telecinco	Patito Feo
Chile	Spanish	TVN / Disney Channel	Patito Feo
Colombia	Spanish	Caracol TV / Disney Channel	Patito Feo
Mexico	Spanish	Televisa / Disney Channel	Patito Feo
Dominican Republic	Spanish	Antena Latina / Disney Channel	Patito Feo
Costa Rica	Spanish	Teletica / Disney Channel	Patito Feo
Honduras	Spanish	Televicentro / Disney Channel	Patito Feo
Panama	Spanish	Telemetro / Disney Channel	Patito Feo
Paraguay	Spanish	Telefuturo / Disney Channel	Patito Feo
Uruguay	Spanish	Teledoce / Disney Channel	Patito Feo
Venezuela	Spanish	Televen / Disney Channel	Patito Feo
Ecuador	Spanish	Ecuavisa / Disney Channel	Patito Feo
Peru	Spanish	Disney Channel	Patito Feo
El Salvador	Spanish	Disney Channel	Patito Feo
Guatemala	Spanish	Disney Channel	Patito Feo
Nicaragua	Spanish	Disney Channel	Patito Feo
Ecuador	Spanish	Disney Channel	Patito Feo
Bolivia	Spanish	PAT / Disney Channel	Patito Feo
United States	Spanish	Univision	Patito Feo
Czech Republic	Czech	Disney Channel	Patito Feo
Slovakia	Czech	Disney Channel	Patito Feo
Hungary	Hungarian	FEM3 / Disney Channel	Patito Feo
Romania	Romanian	Disney Channel	Patito Feo
Bulgaria	Bulgarian	Disney Channel	Patito Feo
Israel	Spanish (Hebrew subtitles)	ערוץ הילדים	פטיטו (Patito)
Serbia	Serbian	Ultra	Ružno pače / Ружно паче (Ugly Duckling)
Montenegro	Serbian	Ultra	Ružno pače / Ружно паче (Ugly Duckling)
Bosnia and Herzegovina	Serbian	Ultra	Ružno pače / Ружно паче (Ugly Duckling)
North Macedonia	Serbian	Ultra	Ružno pače / Ружно паче (Ugly Duckling)
