= Por Amarte Así =

Por Amarte Así may refer to:

- "Por Amarte Así" (song), 1999 song by Cristian Castro
- Por amarte así (telenovela), 2016
