= Kidz TV =

Children's and anime television channel in Turkey

Kidz/Animez
- Country: Turkey
- Broadcast area: Azerbaijan; Turkish Republic of Northern Cyprus; Turkey

Ownership
- Owner: Oflaz Medya Grubu
- Sister channels: Dizi TV; Fil TV; Sinema TV (2012-2018) license from: Eurosport; Eurosport 2 Eurosport HD; Lifetime (Turkey)

History
- Launched: February 3, 2012
- Closed: February 1, 2019
- Former names: Animex

Kidz/Animez was a Turkish free-to-air children's and anime channel. It was established on 3 February 2012. Kidz/Animez broadcasts between 00:30 to 23:00 and between 23:00 to 00:30 in Animez broadcasts. On February 1, 2019, Kidz/Animez closed down.

== Programs ==
=== Preschool series ===
- Baby Jake
- Chinamation Rubi
- JoNaLu
- Klumpies
- Orman Dostları
- Playtime Buddies
- Pocoyo
- Popples
- Raju the Rickshaw
- Uki
- Vipo: Adventures of the Flying Dog
- Vipo & Friends: Surviving Time Island

=== Cartoon series ===
- A Kind of Magic
- All Hail King Julien
- Alvinnn!!! and the Chipmunks
- Angel's Friends
- Blazing Teens
- Code Lyoko
- Digimon Fusion
- Dinofroz
- Edgar & Ellen
- Gon
- Heidi, Girl of the Alps
- Iron Man: Armored Adventures
- K3
- Lassie
- Lucky Fred
- Mademoiselle Zazie
- Magi-Nation
- Matt Hatter Chronicles
- Maya the Honey Bee
- MetaJets
- Mini Avengers
- Muddle Earth
- Peanuts
- PINY: Institute of New York
- Robin Hood: Mischief in Sherwood
- Rusty Knight
- Sandra the Fairytale Detective
- Shuriken School
- The Adventures of Paddington Bear
- The Adventures of Puss in Boots
- The Adventures of Tintin
- The New Adventures of Figaro Pho
- Titeuf
- Trollz
- Turbo Fast
- Yowamushi Pedal

=== Series ===
- Debra!
- H_{2}O: Just Add Water
- Me and My Monsters
- M.I. High
- Patito Feo
- Power Rangers RPM
- Power Rangers Samurai
- The Next Step
- Walk on the Wild Side
- Wingin' It
- World's End
- Zoey 101

=== Animez block ===
- Lucky Star
- Basilisk
- Bleach
- D.Gray-man
- Darker than Black
- Death Note
- Deltora Quest
- Digimon Fusion
- Fullmetal Alchemist
- Fullmetal Alchemist Brotherhood
- Ghost in the Shell: Stand Alone Complex
- Hellsing
- Last Exile
- Naruto
- Sailor Moon
- Samurai 7
- Yowamushi Pedal

=== Short cartoon series ===
- Angus & Cheryl
- Crime Time
- Rintindumb
- Shopkins
- Tendres Agneaux
