= Laura Natalia Esquivel =

Argentine actress and singer

Laura Esquivel
- Esquivel in 2026

Background information
- Also known as: Laura Esquivel
- Born: Laura Natalia Esquivel; Buenos Aires, Argentina
- Origin: Buenos Aires
- Genres: Pop, latin pop, teen pop
- Occupations: Actress, singer
- Instruments: Vocals, piano, ukulele
- Years active: 2003–present
- Labels: EMI Televisa Music; Independent

Laura Natalia Esquivel (born 18 May 1994 in Buenos Aires, Argentina), known professionally as Laura Esquivel, is an Argentine actress and singer, who gained international popularity for her debut as a child actress in the role of Patricia "Patito" Castro in the popular Argentine children's telenovela, Patito Feo (2007–08).

== Biography ==
She is the only daughter born to two doctors in Buenos Aires. Her father is a urologist and her mother is a gynecologist. Her paternal grandfather, Horacio, who died before she was born, was a set designer. She is the only member of her family who is involved in show business. Until she was 18 years old, she did not travel or work on sets without one or both of her parents present. She had a sheltered upbringing due to her career as a child performer.

=== Early career ===
From the age of 7, Laura took singing, acting, piano and dance lessons in her native Argentina. She was first introduced to the general public on reality-musical format Codigo F.A.M.A. Argentina which was aired across Latin America in 2005. She was chosen to represent Argentina in the international version of the show and was one of the finalists in 2005.

Afterwards, she appeared in a tribute to Roberto Gómez Bolaños (Chespirito) in 2005 and in the variety show Sábado Gigante. She was also chosen as one of the leads in the musical Peter Pan which had a long run in Buenos Aires.

In 2005, Argentina's most-watched show, Showmatch, did a segment on talented kids. Her segment, in which she sang Disney songs, achieved extremely high ratings and big repercussion. Because of that, Marcelo Tinelli offered her a development deal and she was soon chosen as the lead in Patito Feo, a child-oriented telenovela produced by Ideas del Sur.

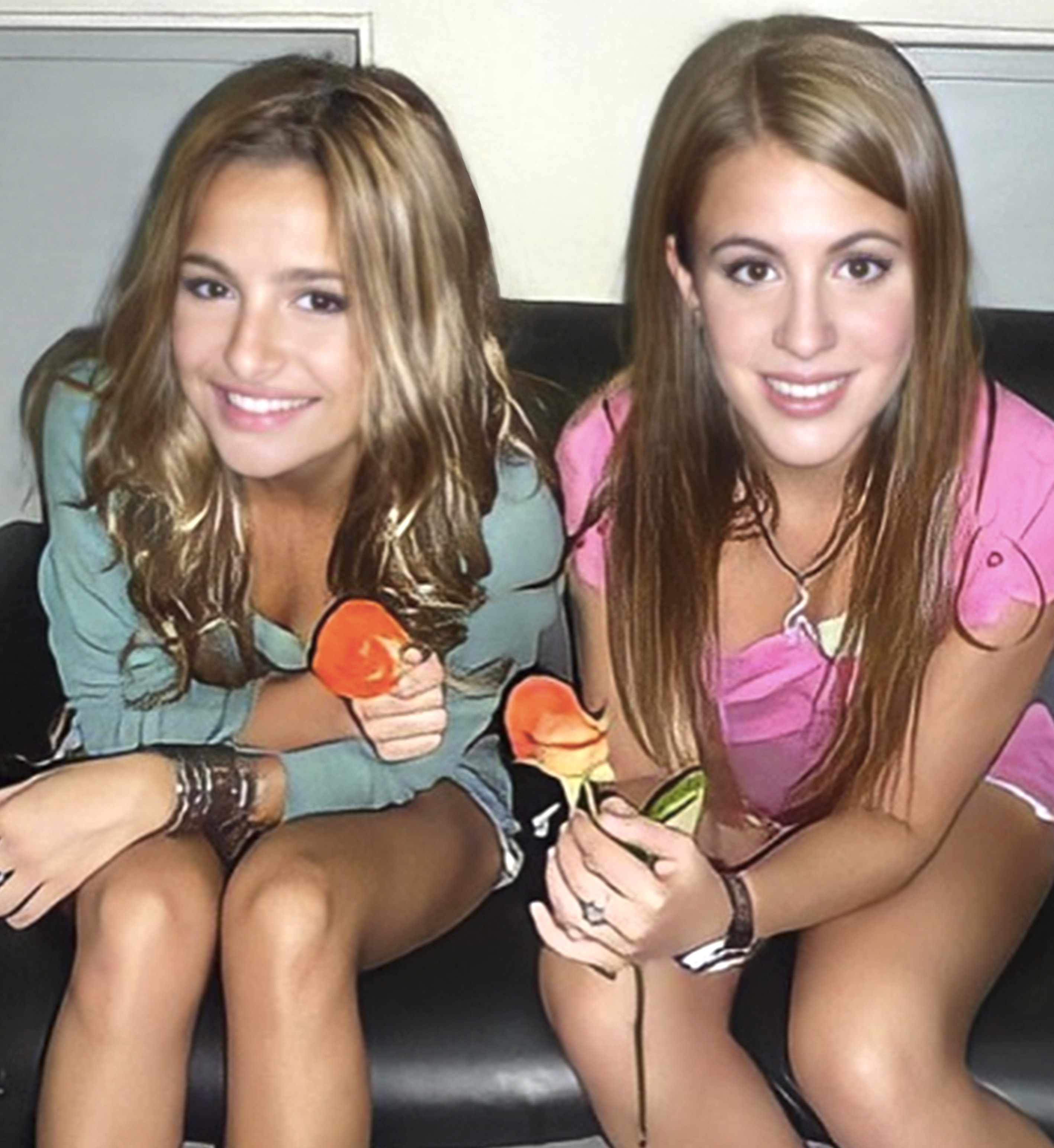
The stars of Patito Feo: Brenda Asnicar (l.) played antagonist Antonella Lamas Bernardi, while Esquivel (r.) played the title role of Patricia "Patito" Díaz-Rivarola Castro (2006)

Patito Feo began filming in 2006 in Buenos Aires. Its soundtrack achieved multiple platinum certifications and a Gardel Award. The show was also a huge success, achieving high ratings and sold-out stadium concerts all over Latin America; it received a nomination for the International Emmy Awards in 2008 for the Children and Young People category.

After two seasons, Patito Feo ended in 2008. Laura continued touring with the cast throughout Argentina and Latin America. In 2008, the show became a huge success in Europe, especially in Turkey, Italy and Greece. She and the cast of Patito Feo toured in Italy with a stage production based on Patito Feo and was also chosen by Mediaset as one of the leads in a telenovela they will produce in Argentina. Esquivel learned Italian and starred in the Italian movie, Un paradiso per due alongside her former Patito Feo castmate Gaston Soffritti in 2009. The following year, Esquivel was cast in the Italian movie, Natale in Sudafrica. In 2010, while touring Italy and Greece, Laura signed an endorsement deal with Monnalisa to promote its Teenager line Jakioo. In 2011, Laura spent the majority of her time touring in Italy and Greece to promote the theatrical versions of Patito Feo. She is also a hostess on the Argentine teen TV show, Mundo Teen.

In 2013, she was cast as "Merlina Addams" in the Argentine musical, Los Locos Addams, based on The Addams Family television series. For her work, she won a Hugo Award for Best New Actress.

Due to the success of Los Locos Addams, she was offered a role as a contestant on a new singing competition, Tu cara me suena. From 2013 to 2015, she regularly appeared on the show, where she interpreted famous songs in the style of the original performers. She won the series in 2017 when she performed a duet singing the 1981 Lionel Richie and Diana Ross song, Endless Love.

=== Transition to adult acting roles and career as a solo singer (2021 to present) ===
She had a role in the Amazon Prime television mini-series, Maradona, sueño bendito, in 2021. The show premiered internationally on October 21, 2021, on Amazon Prime. In 2022, she performed in the Spanish-language Argentine production of Kinky Boots. The role marked a transition in her career from child star to a more mature role. She previously auditioned in 2019 for a role in the musical during its first season of shows but was not successful. Later, she was called by the show's producers a year later in 2020 and was offered the role of "Lauren" after the previous actress dropped out.

In January 2018, she released her debut single, Siento que lo haré. Her EP, Un rato, which was released for streaming platforms on May 10, 2024. The EP features original songs composed by Esquivel and was self-released without the aid of a record label.

Her self-titled debut album was released worldwide for streaming on 23 August 2024. The album features 10 songs written by Esquivel and was met with critical praise for its honest and introspective material by Billboard Magazine Argentina. The album, like her previous solo material, was released without a record label. Esquivel performed the album in its entirety, to rave reviews, on 19 September 2024 at the popular Buenos Aires nightclub, La Trastienda.

== Personal life ==
Esquivel resides in Buenos Aires. She was raised in the San Telmo neighbourhood of Buenos Aires. She dated Argentine TV producer, José Barrientos, for three years from 2014 to 2017, who was 10 years her senior. She has been in a relationship since 2017 with Facundo Cedeira, who works as a political journalist. They met at a bar in Buenos Aires. In May 2024, she shared with the Argentine press that she struggled with anxiety and depression due to the global popularity she gained as a result of Patito Feo's success. Despite the popularity of Patito Feo, Esquivel was bullied during the series' airing by people who recognized her in public. In her 20s, she attended therapy for several years for the bullying and self-esteem issues she faced in childhood.

Esquivel attended the same school with many of her childhood classmates while working as a child actress. She studied for two and half years at Escuela Mitra in Buenos Aires and is a certified vocal coach. She graduated high school at 18 and later studied speech therapy at the University of Argentine Social Museum in Buenos Aires. Esquivel considers herself to be a private, quiet person. She stated to the Argentine press in 2022 that she does not have friends in the entertainment industry and she shuns attending media events. Her closest friends are her former high school classmates. She is fluent in English and Italian, in addition to her native Spanish. She has performed songs on television in Italian and Hebrew, in addition to Spanish and English. She is a fan of Celine Dion and has performed several covers of Dion's songs on various reality competition TV shows in Argentina.

== Discography ==
- 2004 Peter Pan (soundtrack)
- 2007 Patito Feo La Historia Más Linda
- 2007 Patito Feo La Historia Más Linda En El Teatro
- 2008 Patito Feo La Vida Es Una Fiesta
- 2012 Giro Giro (Digital single)
- 2012 Locura (Digital single)
- 2012 Lenguaje perfecto (Digital single)
- 2012 Aquel amor (Digital single)
- 2012 Estarè Contigo (Digital single)
- 2017 Divina (Soundtrack as a featured vocalist)
- 2023: Refugio (Un rato digital single)
- 2023: Pintame (Un rato digital single)
- 2024 Un rato (EP; released for streaming worldwide )
- 2024: Ya no me duele (Un rato digital single)
- 2024: Un dia a la vez (Un rato digital single)
- 2024: Laura Esquivel (Debut solo album; released worldwide for streaming)

== Filmography ==
| Year | Project | Role | Notes |
|---|---|---|---|
| 2007–08 | Patito Feo | Patricia "Patito" Castro | Main cast; Acting debut |
| 2009 | Un paradiso per due | Margherita | TV film (Italian film) |
| 2010 | Natale in Sudafrica | Laura Rischio | Film |
| 2010 | Mundo Teen | Herself | Hostess |
| 2011 | Maktub | Linda | Film |
| 2013 | Lola, Aprendiz de musa | Lola | TV series |
| 2013–15; 2017 | Tu Cara Me Suena | Contestant | Reality series/Winner of the 2017 series |
| 2017 | Divina, está en tu corazón | Divina | Main cast |
| 2021 | Maradona, sueño bendito, | Claudia | Supporting role; Amazon Prime TV series |

=== Theatre ===
- 2003: Peter pan, todos podemos vuela (Spanish-language adaptation as Niña Perdida and Wendy)
- 2009-2010: Patito Feo (stage adaption as Patito)
- 2013: Los Locos Addams (Spanish-language musical as Merlina Addams)
- 2022: Kinky Boots (Spanish-language musical as Lauren, premiered in Argentina)
