= Blazing Teens =

- Screenplay by: Li Jianglin, Zhang Lei
- Directed by: Zhang Lei
- Starring: Zhang Yifan as Leon; Lu Mengxin as Mini; Chen Weidong as Mark; Yin Peng as Michael; Cui Luni as Linda; Cheng Sudong as Gordon; Ju Renxi as Jacky; Yang Zhi Tao as Marco
- Country of origin: China
- Original language: Chinese
- No. of episodes: 40

Production
- Producer: Zhan Qi'an
- Production location: Shanghai
- Running time: 24 minutes
- Production company: Alpha Group Co., Ltd.

Original release
- Release: May 1, 2006

Blazing Teens
- Chinese: 火力少年王
- Literal meaning: Firepower Youth King
Transcriptions
Standard Mandarin
- Hanyu Pinyin: Huǒlì Shàoniánwáng
Yue: Cantonese
- Jyutping: fo2 lik6 siu2 nin4 wong4

Blazing Teens is a Chinese television series created by Alpha Group Co., Ltd. and Auldey Toys in 2006. It is the television adaptation of Auldey's yo-yo line of the same name.

== Premise ==
The show focuses on high schools that hold yo-yo contests. The schools organize teams and participate in competitions to win against other schools. Each team has their own issues that they solve, and each yo-yo has a name that reflects the toy's design.

A yo‑yo match is head-to-head or freestyle, with players performing tricks in timed rounds. Judges score based on difficulty, execution, creativity, and style. The winner is the one with higher points or last-standing in knockout rounds.

Some of the yo-yo tricks are common, like the Forward Pass, Loop-the-Loop, Three-Leaf-Clover, Trapeze, Double or Nothing, Gravity Pull, etc. The show also has some tricks of its own created by the producers (most of the tricks are for professionals) like the White Buddha, Buddha's Revenge and the Cold Fusion (hardest trick of Season One).

== Synopsis ==
=== Season 1 ===
The main characters are Leon (李非, Li Fei), Mini (米莉, Mi Li), Mark (麦军, Mai Jun) and Michael (迈克, Maike). Leon is the protagonist and Michael is the rival.

Leon lost to Michael in the yo-yo contest of California and in taunt, Michael said that Leon can never beat him if his Eastern techniques can't beat his own Western speed. So to learn more and train the power of the Eastern yo-yo, Leon returns to China and stops a robbery on his trip, which catches the eye of a school coach who had been given the work of starting a yo-yo team for Jianghai High School. The school doesn't have the required money to get a training spot and uniforms, and the coach must find a way to solve this problem. By trying to use his own cash, the coach stood on the work of making the team by taking the school's yo-yo players in a trick show.

The coach asks Leon to join the Jianghai team in order to make their victory much easier, but Leon doesn't get along with some of the team's players, who once tried to con a yo-yo from a boy by exchanging it for an outdated Nuclear Fission yo-yo.

But on the first training day of Summer, Leon decides to join the team after all. During training, Leon likes to practice far from the other players so that he is not disturbed, which made the other players jealous, prompting them to try and get rid of him. Leon gets mistakenly accused for stealing cheese and gets expelled.

Their rivals, the Chengnan team, decide to cheat by suggesting a friendly battle to see Jianghai's Special Tricks. Mini lost at the end, but then Leon comes in at the last moment and beats the other team.

When the training is over, they go back to the school, but Michael comes back from the US to make his own team and humiliate Leon, so that he never faces him again in the next Yo-Yo contest of the US. His minions "Cold Cat" and "Hot Dog" comes to battle and see the special tricks of the JiangHai team. They beat many players of both the JiangHai and the ChengNan Yo-Yo teams with their yo-yos Polar Wolf and RattleSnake. Even the cousin of the captain from the ChengNan team have been defeated by Cold Cat.

The tournament which has been renamed "Youth Fire" due to the begging of the coach to enter all of his players since there was only possible of 6 players to enter before have been started and by Leon training of his Yo-Yo into Fire Thunder in order to use Final Divine Light that required to learn Red, Orange, Yellow, Green, Teal, Blue and Violet Divine Light tricks first, he made the team exchange their tricks since Michael's team now know their tricks due to the school exchange of a JiangHai player.

At the tournament, Shawn (赵小松, Zhao Xiaosong) was selected for performance of the first part of the contest. He did surprisingly well and got 9.96 points which though, is the lowest score of the contest so far. In the final battle between Leon and Michael, all goes well and Michael loses.

=== Season 2 ===
In Season 2, the main characters are the Blazing Yo-Yo Club Club and their rivals, the Lightning Yo-Yo Club. Leon is still the main character, as well as the member of the Blazing Yo-Yo Club. Marco also appears in Season 2 as the captain of the Lightning Yo-Yo Club. Timothy (高添, Gao Tian) is the new antagonist of the season, though he first appeared in twelfth episode. The other members of the Blazing Yo-Yo Club are Fiona (欧阳岚, Ouyang Lan) the Club's captain; Simon (丘岳, Qiu Yue), Peter (震海, Zhen Hai), Frankie (江知亚, Jiang Zhi Ya), Danny (郝军, Hao Jun), Sandy (桐童, Tong Tong), and Charles (蔡冲, Cai Chong). As for the other members for the Lightning Yo-Yo Club, there are Lisa (莉萨, Li Sa), Lawson (罗刚, Luo Gang), Billy (郭浩, Guo Hao), and Rocky (刘奇, Liu Qi). Mini initially was a member of the Blazing Yo-Yo Club, but towards the end of Season 2, she was eventually transferred to the Lightning Yo-Yo Club.

=== Season 3 ===
In Season 3, the main characters are Jacky (姚杰, Yao Jie) and Liam (凌亮, Ling Liang). Their teammates are Ken (吴永康, Wu Yongkang),Jerry (毕家乐, Bi Jiale) and Lily (罗莉, Luo Li). Sandy (叶霜, Ye Shuang) is a girl who makes new yo-yos for the team members. They are all part of the Blazing Team, and Jacky is their team leader.

Jacky and Liam are not fond of each other. Liam is arrogant and when he got into the Blazing Team, he left. After more conflict, Jacky drives Liam away from the team. Liam suddenly learns that he has to take part in the Fire Cup yoyo competition. Ken and Jerry gradually decide to give him another choice, but when Liam's father comes along, there is a misunderstanding.

Meanwhile, Dylan (迪兰, Di Lan), a world-class champion comes to China with the hope of making a team with the strongest players and thus prove that only Western skills should be counted as 'true yo-yo' skills and the Chinese skills would never come close to the advanced skills of the Western. His team later becomes the Falcon Team.

Liam, Lily and their friends Sean (何顺, He Shun), Onion (杨聪, Yang Cong) and Charles try to make amends between Jacky and Ray (郭睿, Guo Rui) (Super Tornado's team leader and Onion and Charles' leader) because of a misunderstanding from the last National Competition. They try to do this to stop Dylan from achieving his 'evil' ambition.

Lily is despised by her cousin, Takashi, from the Falcon Team. The Blazing Team's final aim is to beat Falcon Team and prove that Chinese techniques are not worse than that of the Western.

Throughout this season there is a constant mention about "the true meaning of yo-yoing" which is enjoying and having fun. After the National Competitions, there is a lead in to Blazing Teens 3.5, about the masked yo-yoers. These people are Dylan's team where he came from.

Later adapted to a live-action film.

=== Season 3.5/4 ===
In China, Season 3.5 was never recognised as a full season - it was never given a name. However, according to the English Auldey website, it is known as "Season 4".

Liam starts with a brief summary of what happened in season 3. They are still looking for suitable players (3A, 5A) for their team. Liam and Kelvin[Chen Kai] go to Shanghai, to look for the legendary 3A player that is supposedly scary. After some encouragement from Sandy, Liam and Kelvin[Chen Kai] reluctantly go. Jacky heads to Beijing, to look for a 5A player, and visit Mrs. [Weng], an elderly lady who supposedly taught Jacky 4A. It is hinted that the 4A player Leo[Li Xiang Yang] from Dylan's team, Tornado, is the grandson of Mrs. [Weng]. (Please do not confuse with "Super Tornado Team" in Season 3).

In Shanghai, Liam drags Kelvin[Chen Kai] to an arcade. He plays one game and he receives the highest score. One very short teenager challenges Liam to a game. However, Liam rudely rejects that person, and calls him a "child" and "immature". Little does he know that this "child" was the legendary 3A player he was looking for and he was already in his last year of junior high.

Liam and Kelvin[Chen Kai] temporarily reside at Charles' grandmother's house. They ask Charles whether he knows anything about the legendary player. He takes out his yoyo... it was damaged by this legendary player. Liam swears revenge.

When they go to find the legendary player, Liam mistakenly thinks someone else is the player. However, he realises that the short guy he met at the arcade is the legendary player. He challenges him, saying "the winner shall have his wish granted". They start their challenge. David[Lin Xiaozhi] wins, and forces Liam to become his slave.

David[Lin Xiaozhi] is actually a very lonely guy. Many people think he uses his yoyo to do bad things to others. Liam realises this and they eventually become friends.

On the other hand, in Beijing, Jacky sticks around Mrs. [Weng]. Apparently, her grandson is one of the two who are trying to stop them finding team members. He is the 4A player.

In the second arc (unfinished) of Blazing Teens Season 3, Dylan asked his team to stop fighting Chinese yoyoers unfairly. Three people do not listen - respectively the 3A, 4A and 5A players. The 5A player is a girl.

Mrs. [Weng] and her grandson have not been friendly with each other for a long time. Mrs. [Weng] desperately wants her grandson to forgive her. Knowing this, the 4A player tries to make Mrs. [Weng] hurt Jacky with acupuncture and other things. Jacky changes their views.

Jacky goes to another city to recruit a 5A player. Dylan's 5A player infiltrates their team and causes havoc. Sandy is nearly driven away from the team but Jacky refused to believe that that 5A player would do such a thing. She almost damaged the team's yoyos.

=== Season 4 ===
Also known as "Hip-Hop Yoyo"(舞动火力). There are 42 episodes in this season. There are more characters introduced in this season. Skills range from 1A to 5A.

Only these original characters (from Season 3) are in this season:

- Jacky (Appeared in Blazing Team, S3-4)
- Hippo (Appeared in Blazing Team, S3)
- Sean (Appeared in Falcon Team, S3)
- Andy (Appeared in Falcon Team, S3)
- Ray (Appeared in Super Tornado, S3)
- Charles (Appeared in Super Tornado, S3)

== Blazing Team ==
In 2015, Hasbro acquired the North American rights to the franchise and co-produced the Chinese-American animated series Blazing Team: Masters of Yo Kwon Do, with Alpha Group. On October 21, 2015, Hasbro Studios uploaded a trailer for the series. The series started airing on Discovery Family on November 13, 2015, with the show's second season aired on the channel on July 22, 2017. It was not renewed for a third season.

== Broadcast ==
Country	Channel
China	CCTV-14
Turkey	Minika; Nickelodeon; Kidz TV
Philippines	GMA Network
Indonesia	Spacetoon
India	Pogo
Pakistan	Cartoon Network
Vietnam	Sao TV
Croatia	HRT 2
Arab League	Spacetoon; MBC 3 MBC Action; Ajyal TV; Syndication
South Korea	KBS1; Tooniverse

== Other facts ==
- Occasionally, there are Blazing Teens Trick Contests held in China, each Blazing Teens fan will perform tricks with their own Yo-Yos.
- Seasons 3, 4, and 5 of the series have been adapted to manhua and have inspired a novel with the same name.

== See also ==
- Armor Hero (Chinese: 铠甲勇士)
- Balala the Fairies (Chinese: 巴啦啦小魔仙)
