= The Uninvited (2024 film) =

- Theatrical release poster
- Directed by: Nadia Conners
- Written by: Nadia Conners
- Produced by: Rosie Fellner; Carlos Cuscó; Ari Taboada
- Starring: Walton Goggins; Elizabeth Reaser; Rufus Sewell; Pedro Pascal; Eva De Dominici; Lois Smith
- Cinematography: Robert Leitzell
- Edited by: Patrick Walsh; Todd Zelin
- Music by: Eric Avery
- Production companies: Foton Pictures; Rosebud Pictures
- Distributed by: Foton Distribution
- Release dates: March 11, 2024 (SXSW); April 11, 2025 (United States)
- Running time: 97 minutes
- Country: United States
- Language: English

The Uninvited is a 2024 American comedy-drama film written and directed by Nadia Conners in her directorial debut. The film stars Pedro Pascal, Lois Smith, Elizabeth Reaser, Walton Goggins, Eva De Dominici, and Rufus Sewell. Its plot revolves around a stranger crashing a party which leads to a comedy of errors, and a reordering of life.

The Uninvited premiered at the South by Southwest Film Festival on March 11, 2024, and was released in the United States on April 11, 2025.

== Premise ==
Actress-turned-reluctant homemaker Rose (Elizabeth Reaser), and her agent husband Sammy (Walton Goggins) host a small party to impress a star client (Rufus Sewell), but tensions simmer beneath the glamorous façade when an elderly woman (Lois Smith) unexpectedly arrives, claiming the house was once hers.

== Cast ==
- Pedro Pascal as Lucian, a Hollywood star
- Walton Goggins as Sammy, Hollywood agent and Rose's husband
- Elizabeth Reaser as Rose, renowned stage actress turned Hollywood housewife and Sammy's wife
- Rufus Sewell as Gerald, Sammy's top client who arrives coked-out
- Eva De Dominici as Delia, ingénue
- Lois Smith as Helen, the confused elderly woman claiming to live in the couple's home

== Reception ==
On the review aggregator website Rotten Tomatoes, 76% of 38 critics' reviews are positive. Metacritic, which uses a weighted average, assigned the film a score of 61 out of 100, based on nine critics, indicating "generally favorable" reviews.

The performances have been praised, especially Reaser and Smith.

Critics appreciated the film's visual style and the way it uses its setting—a sprawling Hollywood home—to create a sense of both intimacy and unease. Director Nadia Conners is praised for maintaining an intriguing tension throughout, and for a sharp character study and exploration of aging, gender roles, and Hollywood's superficiality.

The film won the Best Drama Feature at the 2024 San Diego International Film Festival.

== Release ==
The film had its world premiere at South by Southwest on March 11, 2024. It was released in the United States on April 11, 2025.
