= Cantaniño cuenta un cuento =

- Directed by: Mario David
- Release date: 1979
- Country: Argentina
- Language: Spanish

Cantaniño cuenta un cuento is a 1979 musical comedy film directed by Mario David and starring Berugo Carámbula, Mario Pasik, and Mónica Vehil.

== Cast ==
- Berugo Carámbula
- Gachi Ferrari as Llí
- Mario Pasik as Alfredo
- Mónica Vehil as Lucrecia
- Javier Portales as Don Roberto Sacote
- Juan Carlos de Seta as Inspector
- Pablo Cumo
- Rina Morán
- Coro Sapito de Oro
- La Mona Margarita
- Virginia Faiad as Maestro
- Mario Luciani
- Rodolfo Onetto
- Sergio Corona
- Carlos Romero
- Juan Carlos Fontana (II)
- Alfredo Pérez
- Adriana Salgueiro as Azafata
- Alfredo Quesada
- Ricardo Suñé
- Claudio España
- Adolfo Castelo
- Nicolás Scarpino
- Mangacha Gutiérrez
