= Crew972 =

3D animation studio

Crew 972 Ltd.
- Type: Private company limited by shares
- Industry: Animation; CGI animation
- Founded: 2005
- Founder: Alex Orrelle; Michelle Orrelle
- Headquarters: Tel Aviv, Israel
- Key people: Dror Daliot, head of studio Menashe Morobuse, head of 3D; Doron Meir, head of animation
- Website: Crew972.com

Crew972 is an Israeli 3D animation studio that provides 3D animation services and develops and creates original animated entertainment.

== History ==
Crew 972 is a limited liability company founded in Tel Aviv Israel in 2005 for the purpose of creating animated entertainment. It is a production company that provides animation services from concept to finished frames and is developing original properties . It was co founded in 2005 by Alex and Michelle Orrelle. Crew972 - named after Israel's international dialing code

== Management ==
President and co-founder Alex Orrelle spend eight years in San Francisco, where he worked on Disney/Pixar's The Incredibles, Finding Nemo, Boundin, and the Monsters, Inc. DVD; and on Manex Entertainment/Warner Bros. The Matrix Reloaded. During his studies, Alex made two award winning traditional animated short films and created and directed the CG short film Freeware, the 2001 winner of the Sundance On-Line Film Festival.

== Projects ==
- Cartoon Network The Looney Tunes Show Wile E. Coyote and the Road Runner segments
- Cartoon Network "Nood" bumpers aired from July 14, 2008 – May 28, 2010.
- "Adrenaline Lemmings" Animation test (45 sec, HD Video and 3D animation hybrid) proof of concept for a series of branded shorts developed for Disney Short Films. Crew 972 created a concept about four adrenaline junkie lemmings that get into trouble by performing extreme stunts in search of the highest high.
- Experimental short film, combining flash animation (Irma, the driver) of a 3D car, composited over a still illustrated background.
- "FIFA World Cup Trophy Tour by Coca-Cola" (3 min, Stereoscopic 3D animation) - Made for the 2006 World Cup Soccer championship, this is a segment from a seven-minute film which accompanied the trophy exhibition that traveled through 32 countries.
- "Order-Up!" Cinematic (3 min, 3D animation) Crew 972 animated 3 cinematic scenes and twenty in-game animation clips for Order-Up!, a Nintendo-Wii game developed by Super Villain Studios.
- Sir Billi, animated film starring the voices of Sir Sean Connery, Alan Cumming, and Miriam Margolyes. The film was released in 2010 with the theme song performed by Dame Shirley Bassey.
- "Danone Actimel" TV commercial (30 sec, 3D animation) Produced by Crew 972 for Y&R Israel, characters were animated in 3D and rendered to look like classic animation.
- "Bomb Monkey" (15 sec, 3D animation) game developer Super Villain Studios hired Crew 972 to produce a logo sequence starring their logo character. The character, planes and bombs were animated in 3D, then rendered in an inky flat palette to resemble the graphic novel illustration style in the logo.
- "Perez 2" Character Animation (3D animation) Crew 972 was hired to animate 20 minutes of a feature film by Filmax (Madrid), which provided storyboards and 3D models.
- "Pet Rock Monster" proof of concept (16 sec, 2D animation) animation test for a mobile game concept by Crew 972, involving music and virtual pets.
- "Slottsville" gaming website Crew 972 was hired to design and animated 3D environments and 2D characters in a retro cartoon style.
- The Tempest Crew 972 produced animated “lava dogs” as visual effects on the motion picture The Tempest (Directed by Julie Taymor).
- *Vipo: Adventures of the Flying Dog - over five hours of an animated television show for children
- 3 minutes of high-end stereoscopic animation for the FIFA World Cup Tour sponsored by Coca-Cola
- Sci-Fi "If" campaign (4x5 seconds)
- 20 minutes for the Bratz Interactive DVD
- PepsiCo for internet and television
- Eyeball NYC "Bella Sara"
- CandyLab for Sony PSP
- Japanese TV (client Eyeball)
- Mountain Dew
- Leo Burnett
- Ogilvy and Mather
- Medal of Honor Airborne for Electronic Arts
- Introduction Animation for Pro Evolution Soccer 6
