= Blazing Team: Masters of Yo Kwon Do =

- Chinese promotional poster
- Genre: Action; Adventure
- Directed by: Gu Yan Hua; Wang Hong Long; Yu Hai Ying; Hui Zheng; Huang Jian Feng; Xiang Zheng
- Voices of: English: Arya Hora; Patrick Munday; Michael C. Pizzuto; Jamie Anderson; Muriel Hofmann
- Composer: Henry Lai
- Countries of origin: China; United States
- Original languages: Chinese; English
- No. of seasons: 2
- No. of episodes: 42

Production
- Executive producer: Cai Dong Qing
- Producer: Gina Guo
- Running time: 22 minutes
- Production companies: Guangdong Alpha Animation & Culture; Shenzhen Sun Animation Co. Ltd.; Shenzhen Charm Animation Co. Ltd.; Nexson Audio-Visual Production Studio; Hasbro Studios

Original release
- Network: Discovery Family (U.S.); iQiyi (China)
- Release: November 13, 2015 – September 9, 2017

Blazing Team: Masters of Yo Kwon Do (Chinese: 火力少年王悠拳英雄; pinyin: Huǒlì Shàonián Wáng Yōu Quán Yīngxióng; lit. 'Blazing Teens: Yo-Kwon-Do Heroes') is an animated television series produced by Guangdong Alpha Animation & Culture and Hasbro Studios. The show is a re-imagining of Alpha's Blazing Teens yo-yo property aimed at western audiences.

The series aired over two seasons and was originally commissioned for 52 episodes. The 26-episode first season debuted in the United States on November 13, 2015, on Discovery Family. With an episode count reduced by 10, the 16-episode second season premiered on July 22, 2017 and ended on September 9, 2017. In China, the series debuted on iQiyi and other streaming platforms in August 2017.

== Synopsis ==
Unlike Blazing Teens, the show features an entirely different cast of characters. Four teenagers discover the art known as Yo-Kwon-Do, which combines martial arts with yo-yo tricks. Now, under the guidance of Lao Shi, they must master their skills to protect the world.

== Characters ==
- Parker Bates
- Maddie Stone
- Scott Hardy
- Wilson Tisch
- Lao-Shi: The Blazing Team's teacher and mentor.
- Johnny Stone: Maddie's brother
- Henry Shaw/Belloc

== Episodes ==
=== Series overview ===
Season	Episodes	Originally released		
Season	Episodes	First released	Last released	Network
1	26	November 13, 2015	May 15, 2016	Discovery Family
2	16	July 22, 2017	September 9, 2017	Discovery Family

=== Season 1 (2015–16) ===
No. overall	No. in series	Title	Original release date
1	1	"The First Yo"	November 13, 2015
2	2	"The Second Yo"	November 13, 2015
3	3	"Balancing Act"	November 20, 2015
4	4	"Double Trouble"	November 27, 2015
5	5	"The Greatest Yo on Earth"	December 4, 2015
6	6	"Such a Lonely World"	December 11, 2015
7	7	"Not So Great Scott!"	December 18, 2015
8	8	"The Tiger by the Tail"	January 17, 2016
9	9	"Blind Spot"	January 17, 2016
10	10	"When Fanboys Attack"	January 24, 2016
11	11	"Lonely at the Top"	January 31, 2016
12	12	"Strong like Wilson"	February 7, 2016
13	13	"A Rock and a Shard Place"	February 14, 2016
14	14	"Muscle Beach"	February 21, 2016
15	15	"The Eagle has Landed"	February 28, 2016
16	16	"Yo-Rassic Park"	March 6, 2016
17	17	"Yo-Tomatic for the People"	March 13, 2016
18	18	"In the Light"	March 20, 2016
19	19	"The Longest Shard"	March 27, 2016
20	20	"A Spy for a Spy"	April 3, 2016
21	21	"Return of the Corn Dog"	April 10, 2016
22	22	"Jumping Jack Shard"	April 17, 2016
23	23	"Blaze-y Like a Fox"	April 24, 2016
24	24	"Race to the Finish"	May 1, 2016
25	25	"The End, So Far..."	May 8, 2016
26	26	"Enter the Black Dragon"	May 15, 2016

=== Season 2 (2017) ===
No. overall	No. in season	Title	Original release date
27	1	"Darkness Descends"	July 22, 2017
28	2	"The Order in Chaos"	July 22, 2017
29	3	"The Boy Who Cried Yo"	July 29, 2017
30	4	"Three's a Crowd"	July 29, 2017
31	5	"Heroes & Villains"	August 5, 2017
32	6	"Lightning Strikes"	August 5, 2017
33	7	"Blazing Man: The Movie!"	August 12, 2017
34	8	"A Blazing Scheme"	August 12, 2017
35	9	"So We Meet Again, for the First Time"	August 19, 2017
36	10	"Hail/Hydra"	August 19, 2017
37	11	"Bad Signal"	August 26, 2017
38	12	"Yo'In in the Wind"	August 26, 2017
39	13	"Prison Break"	September 2, 2017
40	14	"Lights Out"	September 2, 2017
41	15	"Three the Hard Way"	September 9, 2017
42	16	"It Takes Two"	September 9, 2017

== International broadcast ==
In Canada, the series aired on Cartoon Network, premiering on April 6, 2016, with a limited promotional run on sibling channel Teletoon, from June 24 to July 11, 2016.

In New Zealand, the series debuted on TVNZ 2 on September 5, 2016. The second season started on August 23, 2017. In Australia, the series aired on Eleven as part of Toasted TV. In Singapore, Blazing Team aired on Channel 5's children's programming block Okto.

In the Middle East and North Africa, the series that premiered on Spacetoon on Sunday November 17, 2019, at 15:00 (KSA) followed by an encore airing that began on the same day at 20:30 (KSA) and Tuesdays with the same timeslots, 4 years after its original U.S. release.
