= Lauren Clair =

Australian actress

Lauren Clair is an Australian actress. For her performance in Underbelly she was nominated for the 2009 Logie Award Most Outstanding Newcomer.

Clair's featured screen roles include the 2011 film Face to Face and the TV series Me and My Monsters. She had recurring roles in Packed to the Rafters, Janet King and Carla Cametti PD and appeared in the spinoff TV movie Home and Away: All or Nothing.

Stage roles include Face to Face (the play that the above film was based on), Hidden Sydney - The Glittering Mile in 2016, and SET in 2013.
