= List of Cumbia Ninja episodes =

Cumbia Ninja is a Colombian supernatural, mystery-thriller television series created for Fox by Andrés Gelós and produced by Nelson Martínez and María Gowland. The series premiered on Fox on September 5, 2013, and the first season concluded on November 13, 2013. In January 2014, Fox renewed the series for a second season which aired from October 2, 2014. The series is produced by Fox Networks Group and Fox Telecolombia.

== Series overview ==
Series	Episodes	Originally aired	
Series	Episodes	Series premiere	Series finale
1	13	5 September 2013	28 December 2013
2	16	2 October 2014	20 December 2014
3	16	29 October 2015	17 December 2015

== Episodes ==
=== Season 1 (2013) ===
No. overall	No. in season	Title	Directed by	Written by	Original release date
1	1	"Ojos en la espalda"	Felipe Martínez	Andrés Gelós	September 5, 2013
In the neighborhood hill, Chico, the leader of the band "El Cruce" is killed, because he wanted to avoid selling drugs by the band "The 2200"; Juana simultaneously loses his entire family at the hands of gunmen and runs away from home under a new identity. On the death of Chico, it is now Hache who will take the place of his brother and Sungaku the dragon, guarded by Master Wu Xiang awake.
2	2	"Somos niebla"	Felipe Martínez	Andrés Gelós, Natacha Caravia	September 12, 2013
While Hache faces the challenge of being the leader of a band, Joan has a unique opportunity: to return to the crime scene and avenge his family. But the La Colina and its dangers not stand idly, nor the mythological protector of Cumbia Ninja, who will leave his lair to defend them.
3	3	"Luz de sombra"	Felipe Martínez	Andrés Gelós, Natacha Caravia	September 19, 2013
Hache lives, for the first time in the flesh, the power of his music to counter the drug violence in the neighborhood. At the same time Juana understands that to face the murderers of his family, you must put his soul at stake.
4	4	"¿De qué lado de la pecera estás?"	Felipe Martínez	Andrés Gelós, Natacha Caravia	September 26, 2013
While the La Colina seems reborn thanks to the influence of Hache, Master Wu Xiang decides to risk his life and goes into the lair of the enemy.
5	5	"Aire caliente"	Felipe Martínez	Andrés Gelós, Natacha Caravia	April 8, 2014
When everything seems to go smoothly, Hache commits a serious error that not only puts at stake the future of Cumbia Ninja, but also the confidence and love Nevis and the people of La Colina, had deposited their leader.
