= Sandra the Fairytale Detective =

Spanish-Indian animated television series

- English Logo, The Fairytale Detective, Sandra
- Spanish: Sandra, detective de cuentos
- Created by: Myriam Ballesteros
- Written by: Txema Ocio
- Directed by: Myriam Ballesteros
- Starring: Jules de Jongh; Dan Russell; Bob Saker; Alex Bothwell
- Composer: John Gladstone Smith
- Countries of origin: Spain; India
- Original language: Spanish
- No. of seasons: 1
- No. of episodes: 52

Production
- Executive producers: Sergi Reitg; Tapaas Chakravarti
- Production companies: Imira Entertainment; Televisión Española; DQ Entertainment

Original release
- Network: Clan
- Release: 12 April 2009 – 14 May 2010

Related
- Lola & Virginia; Lucky Fred

Sandra the Fairytale Detective is an animated television series created by Myriam Ballesteros and produced by Imira Entertainment, Televisión Española (TVE) and DQ Entertainment.

== Synopsis ==
The series revolves around a young girl named Sandra, who solves mysteries in the Fairytale World with Fo the elf, while avoiding interference from a bully named Marcus.

== Characters ==
- Sandra Occhiaperti (voiced by Jules de Jongh) is a 10-year-old girl who is a fairy tale detective. She also takes statements from the victims.
- Fo the Elf (voiced by Dan Russell) is Sandra's partner, a 508-year-old elf with fairy wings. Whenever there is a case that needs to be solved, he takes Sandra to the fairy tale world by casting a magic spell.
- Raquel (voiced by Alex Bothwell) is Sandra's best friend. She wears pigtails and has blonde hair.
- Marcus (voiced by Dan Russell) is Sandra's rival. He is always bullying Sandra without a reason.

=== Fairy Tale Land ===
- Snow White (voiced by Alex Bothwell)
- The Seven Dwarfs (voiced by Bob Saker)
- Hansel & Gretel
- Little Red Riding Hood
- Three Little Pigs
- Pinocchio
- Cinderella
- The Three Musketeers
- Vulture (voiced by Bob Saker)
- The Three Bears (voiced by Dan Russell, Alex Bothwell, and Jules De Jongh)
- Captain Blackbeard (voiced by Bob Saker)
- King Arthur Pendragon (voiced by Bob Saker)
- Morgana Le Fay (voiced by Alex Bothwell)
- Scolymus (voiced by Bob Saker)

== Episodes ==
No. overall	No. in season	Title	Directed by	Written by	Original release date
1	1	"Bad Wolf"	Unknown	Unknown	March 18, 2008 (tvG2); April 12, 2009 (Clan TVE)
Sandra helps the Three Little Pigs.
2	2	"Bubbles"	TBA	TBA	TBA
Sandra and Fo are in the ocean.
3	3	"The Golden Key"	TBA	TBA	TBA
Sandra and Fo help Hansel and Gretel escape.
4	4	"Fairy Dust"	TBA	TBA	TBA
Sandra wakes up Sleeping Beauty.
5	5	"A Prodigious Nose"	TBA	TBA	TBA
Sandra rescues a kidnapped Pinocchio.
6	6	"The Missing Slipper"	TBA	TBA	TBA
Sandra and Fo retrieve a missing glass slipper.
7	7	"Fruits of the Forest"	TBA	TBA	TBA
Sandra saves Fo from the Wolf.
8	8	"The Missing Slipper"	TBA	TBA	TBA
9	9	"Show Us Your Paws"	TBA	TBA	TBA
Sandra protects the Seven Little Kids.
10	10	"Pesky Rodents"	TBA	TBA	TBA
Sandra rescues the children of Hamelin
11	11	"Assaf the Sorcerer"	TBA	TBA	TBA
12	12	"The Royal Egg"	TBA	TBA	TBA
13	13	"Frogs"	TBA	TBA	TBA
14	14	"Toy Room"	TBA	TBA	TBA
15	15	"The Missing Slipper""	TBA	TBA	TBA
15	15	"A Question of Smell"	TBA	TBA	TBA
16	16	"The 22:30 Express"	TBA	TBA	TBA
17	17	"King of Mortadella"	TBA	TBA	TBA
18	18	"The Three Anchors"	TBA	TBA	TBA
19	19	"The Outlawed Cat"	TBA	TBA	TBA
Sandra must help Puss in Boots clear his master's name after he is framed.
20	20	"Forest Without Magic"	TBA	TBA	TBA
21	21	"Acorns"	TBA	TBA	TBA
22	22	"Honey Shampoo"	TBA	TBA	TBA
23	23	"Invincible Dragon"	TBA	TBA	TBA
24	24	"The Mysterious Crystal Ball"	TBA	TBA	TBA
25	25	"The Wild Party"	TBA	TBA	TBA
26	26	"The Riddle Champion"	TBA	TBA	TBA
27	27	"The Water of Life"	TBA	TBA	TBA
28	28	"Makilakiski"	TBA	TBA	TBA
29	29	"The Magic Factory"	TBA	TBA	TBA
30	30	"The Forbidden Room"	TBA	TBA	TBA
31	31	"The Prince of the Pool"	TBA	TBA	TBA
32	32	"Simpleton"	TBA	TBA	TBA
33	33	"The Cup Final"	TBA	TBA	TBA
34	34	"The Repeating Ghost"	TBA	TBA	TBA
35	35	"Giant Love"	TBA	TBA	TBA
36	36	"Avalon Island"	TBA	TBA	TBA
37	37	"The Great Manfred"	TBA	TBA	TBA
38	38	"Captain Blackbeard"	TBA	TBA	TBA
39	39	"The Guide's Servant"	TBA	TBA	TBA
40	40	"The Secret Book"	TBA	TBA	TBA
41	41	"The Princess of the Lake"	TBA	TBA	TBA
42	42	"An Unforgettable Journey"	TBA	TBA	TBA
43	43	"The Cursed Apple"	TBA	TBA	TBA
44	44	"The Supreme Law"	TBA	TBA	TBA
45	45	"Fat Worm"	TBA	TBA	TBA
46	46	"Even More Difficult"	TBA	TBA	TBA
47	47	"Petunias"	TBA	TBA	TBA
48	48	"Die Laughing"	TBA	TBA	TBA
49	49	"The Magic Harp"	TBA	TBA	TBA
50	50	"Green Monkey"	TBA	TBA	TBA
51	51	"Brother Ogre"	TBA	TBA	TBA
Sanda must save Puss in Boots when he gets trapped by an ogre.
52	52	"Scolymus"	TBA	TBA	TBA
53	53	"School for Princesses"	TBA	TBA	TBA

== Broadcast ==
The series was originally broadcast on Clan and later on Disney XD in Spain, but has been broadcast by the Disney Channel worldwide and Nickelodeon in multiple parts of Asia. In Europe, it has been shown on TF1 in France, RTP in Portugal, Toon Disney in Italy, TG4 in Ireland, VTM Kids in Belgium, RSI in Switzerland, DBC in Denmark, M2 in Hungary and Pluto TV Kids in the United Kingdom. In Asia, it has been broadcast on E-Junior in the United Arab Emirates, TV9 in Malaysia, Okto in Singapore, Hanoi TV in Vietnam, Kidz TV in Turkey, RTHK in Hong Kong, Arutz HaYeladim in Israel and TV5 in the Philippines. In South Korea, it has been shown on Kids Talk Talk HD and Cartoon Network, and in the Middle East, it has been broadcast on Kids Network, OSN Kidzone TV and Al Sayyer. It has also been shown on MBC 1 in Mauritius, Canal Once in Mexico, Gloob in Brazil and Qubo in the United States. It has also been available on streaming services such as on Kidoodle.TV in Canada, Iflix in Ghana, and +SBT in Brazil.
