= Me and My Monsters =

Australian children's comedy television program

- Created by: Mark Grant; Claudia Lloyd
- Developed by: Rebecca De Souza
- Directed by: Mark Barnard
- Starring: Macauley Keeper; Ivy Latimer; Lauren Clair; Felix Williamson; Puppeteers: Heath McIvor; Don Austen; David Collins
- Countries of origin: Australia; United Kingdom; United States
- Original language: English
- No. of seasons: 2
- No. of episodes: 26

Production
- Executive producers: Greg Brenman; Donna Andrews; Lisa Henson; Halle Stanford; Cherrie Bottger; Nicole Keeb; Heike Lagé; Sue Nott
- Producers: Pete Coogan; Justine Flynn
- Running time: 25 minutes
- Production companies: Tiger Aspect Productions; The Jim Henson Company; Sticky Pictures; Baker/Coogan Productions

Original release
- Network: Network Ten (Australia); CBBC (United Kingdom)
- Release: 18 October 2010 – 27 April 2011

Me and My Monsters is a children's comedy television program from The Jim Henson Company that combines live action and puppetry. The series is a co-production filmed in Australia. It first screened on CBBC on 18 October 2010 and aired on Network Ten and Nickelodeon.

== Overview ==
The Carlson family, who have recently relocated from Australia to the UK, discover that there are three monsters living in their basement. Eddie would get along with the monsters much to the chagrin of his father and sister and to the delight of his mother.

== Production ==
The series was announced on 27 August 2009, when The Jim Henson Company partnered with British production company Tiger Aspect Productions to produce a new drama series for the CBBC channel entitled Me & My Monsters, in which the series was originally intended to be an American/British co-production and the programme originally intended to feature an American family that moved to a house in London, the series will be created by former cartoonist Mark Grant who developed the series with Tiger Aspect Productions while The Jim Henson Company would create the three puppet monster creatures via its Jim Henson's Creature Shop division in Los Angeles.

However one year later on 10 February 2010, the series was retooled into an Australian/British co-production and the family was changed from an American family to the one of Australia now named the Carlsons when Australian broadcasters Nickelodeon & Network Ten and German broadcaster ZDF joined as co-commissoniers with CBBC while Australian live-action & animation production studio Sticky Pictures alongside producer & founder Donna Andrews (who also founded live-action Buster Dandy Productions with Justine Flynn (which previously co-created & produced Bambaloo and Five Minutes More) until animation studio Sticky Pictures merged Buster Dandy Productions into the former one month prior in January of that year) and British production outfit Baker/Coogan Productions joined the upcoming television series as co-producers with Larry Rickard, George Sawyer, Tom Basden, Sam Leifer and James Bachman would write episodes for the upcoming series alongside creator Mark Grant and would be filmed in Sydney with occasional guest writers while Sticky Pictures' head of Live-Action & former Buster Dandy Productions co-founder Justine Flynn became producer for the upcoming services alongside Baker/Coogan Productions co-founder Pete Coogan whilst Sticky Pictures & Buster Dandy Productions co-founder Donna Andrews serve as executive producer and BBC's distribution arm BBC Worldwide would handle international sales to the series unlike Jim Henson's other series such as Fraggle Rock and The Hoobs which Henson handled worldwide distribution to those series.

There were 13 episodes in the first series. A second series aired less than half a year later and features 13 more episodes. The first series aired on CBBC on 18 October 2010 and aired every week day except Monday until Series 1 Episode 10, Dust Bag Love, which aired on 29 October. Episodes 1 through 10 had a slot of 8:00 am or 8:05 am during half term. When half term finished, the show did not air until 3 November 2010 with Episodes 11 and 12, airing at 6:30pm. Episode 13 aired after that weekend on its normal Tuesday not Monday slot concluding Series One on 8 November 2010. A second series was then set to start airing on 11 April 2011 at 8:00 am, and a new repeat slot of 6:15 pm for the new episodes has been made on CBBC. Originally, the whole two seasons was made as 26 episodes of half-hour for one whole series but has split into two seasons with a 4 to 5-month gap in between their original airdates. The programme last re-aired on CBBC on May 7, 2015 at 11:40am.

== Characters ==
- Eddie Carlson (played by Macauley Keeper) – The monsters' best friend, who is at school at Whitgift in Surrey.
- Angela Carlson (played by Ivy Latimer) – Eddie's older sister who doesn't like the monsters.
- Kate Carlson (played by Lauren Clair) – Eddie's mother; a self-employed cook who the monsters call "human-mum-thingy-person".
- Nick Carlson (played by Felix Williamson) – Eddie's father; a businessman working in advertising who the monsters call "human-dad-thingy-person".

=== Monsters ===
- Haggis (performed by Don Austen, assisted by Sean Masterson (Episodes 1-6) and David Collins (Episodes 7-26), voiced by Don Austen) - A gigantic red and orange monster. He doesn't do a good job at being a monster since he tends to scare himself.
- Norman (performed by Matthew McCoy (Episodes 1-6) and Sean Masterson (Episodes 7-26), assisted by Fiona Gentle, voiced by David C Collins) - A purple monster who is a bit of an oddball and is the only one who can't talk; instead making bizarre noises though Fiend and Haggis can still understand him.
- Fiend (performed by Heath McIvor and Alice Osborne, voiced by Heath McIvor) - A green multi-eyed monster who is the smallest of the bunch. He considers himself the leader of the monsters.

== Cast ==
- Macauley Keeper - Eddie Carlson
- Ivy Latimer - Angela Carlson
- Lauren Clair - Kate Carlson
- Felix Williamson - Nick Carlson

=== Puppeteers ===
- Don Austen - Haggis
- David Collins - Norman, Haggis (assistant puppeteer)
- Fiona Gentle - Norman (assistant puppeteer)
- Sean Masterson - Haggis (assistant puppeteer)
- Matthew McCoy - Norman (assistant puppeteer)
- Heath McIvor - Fiend
- Alice Osborne - Fiend (assistant puppeteer)

== Books ==
Four episodes from the series were turned into books. The first one was called monsters in the basement and was based on series 1, episode 1. The second book was called Monster mess and was based on series 1, episode 10. The third book was called Monster mess and was based on series 1, episode 12. The fourth and final book was called Monster school and was based on series 1, episode 2. Although all books are based on episodes from series 1, the third and fourth book were released during series 2. All books are written by Rory Growler.

== Episodes ==
=== Series 1 (2010) ===
No.	Title	Directed by	Written by	Original release date
1	"Strictly No Pets"	Martin Dennis	Mark Grant	18 October 2010
The Carlson family are moving into their new home, unaware that it has a basement with three monsters living in it. The Monsters tell Eddie that they scared off everyone else who came to look at the house, choosing them to stay. Eddie has to think about how to break the news to the rest of his family…
2	"Monster Smart"	Lynn Hegarty	Mark Huckerby & Nick Ostler	19 October 2010
After Angela gets straight A's on her school report, Eddie becomes extremely nervous that his own report is going to be terrible. So to prevent his parents from getting it, he tries to find it in the post while the Monsters distract the rest of the family.
3	"Monster-in-a-Box"	Martin Dennis	Mark Grant	20 October 2010
Haggis is depressed and no-one is fully sure as to why. The family ask a therapist who concludes that he simply needs a father figure. So Nick reluctantly agrees to take the job.
4	"The Fabulous Monsterettes"	Martin Dennis	Mark Grant	21 October 2010
After learning that Angela is going to have sing in her school assembly, the Monsters decide to reform their old singing group "The Fabulous Monsterettes". Meanwhile, Eddie believes Nick is having an affair and becomes terrified that he's going to leave. So he recruits the Monsters to try to help keep his parents together.
5	"Big Fib"	Marcus Cole	Mark Huckerby & Nick Ostler	22 October 2010
Kate attempts a bizarre new look for her cooking show which does not really suit her but Nick and Angela, unconvincingly, claim it was good, much to the Monsters confusion. Eddie then teaches them about the concept of lying, which soon leads to things getting very out of hand...
6	"Haggis Strikes Back"	Mark Barnard	Laurence Rickard & George Sawyer	25 October 2010
One of Fiend's schemes results in Angela being woken in middle of the night but it's Haggis who gets the brunt of her fury. Knowing that Haggis lacks confidence and is often bullied into doing what Fiend wants, Eddie teaches him to stand up for himself. However, this then leads to him becoming overly assertive.
7	"My Big Fat Monster Wedding"	Marcus Cole	Jamie Lennox & Louis Waymouth	26 October 2010
Nick forgets his and Kate's anniversary and he attempts a last minute surprise dinner for her but the pressure he's under from his boss causes it to go horribly wrong. Kate then remarks that Nick is "not the man [she] married". This leads the Monsters to believe that Nick is an imposter and they kidnap him.
8	"Sleepover"	Marcus Cole	Laurence Rickard & George Sawyer	1 November 2010
Angela is preparing for a sleepover but her friends bail on her at the last minute. The Monsters offer to step in to prevent her being alone and, much to her surprise, she really enjoys their company. But then her friends suddenly turn up, leaving her in a difficult situation of trying to please them and the Monsters.
9	"Dear Diary"	Marcus Cole	Tom Basden & Sam Leifler	4 November 2010
Angela accidentally drops her diary and it doesn't take long for Eddie and the Monsters to start reading it. They quickly return it but when Kate becomes curious about a boy mentioned in the diary who Angela seems to be spending a lot of time with, she enlists Haggis' help in stealing the diary back so she can learn more.
10	"Dust Bag Love"	Martin Dennis	Mark Grant	8 November 2010
Kate becomes sick of constantly tidying up the Monsters mess so she hires a cleaner. Unfortunately, the Monsters disobey Kate's instructions to stay in the basement and scare the cleaner away. Kate then appoints the Monsters as the new cleaners, warning them that if the house is not spotless by the time she comes back, they will have to find somewhere else to live.
11	"Baby Love"	Lynn Hegarty	James Bachman	16 November 2010
Angela is made to look after the baby son of some friends for an afternoon, much to her disgust. This makes the Monsters curious as to where babies come from so Nick tries to explain it to them as delicately as he can but, as usual, they completely misunderstand and Haggis ends up believing he's pregnant.
12	"Call of the Mild"	Mark Barnard	Mark Huckerby & Nick Ostler	17 November 2010
Tired of their constant trouble-making, Nick and Kate banish the Monsters down to the basement (yet again). Eddie then tinkers with the pipes and floods the basement so that his friends can live upstairs. Eddie then teaches the Monsters how to act like grown-ups which they, surprisingly, do very well at but after a few days they are being grown-up all the time, much to Eddie's horror.
13	"Bogey Brothers"	Mark Barnard	Mark Grant	22 November 2010
As he enjoys being among his monster friends so much, Eddie decides that he wants to become a full-time monster. Nick and Kate are not too pleased by this so they invite over a boy from across the street to play with Eddie. This proves to be a success but all they do is play video games and Kate begins to wonder whether Eddie was better off with the Monsters. Meanwhile, the Monsters become bored and try to get Nick to play with them but nearly burst his ear drums and he finally reaches his breaking point with them.

=== Series 2 (2011) ===
No.	Title	Directed by	Written by	Original release date
14	"Monster Lurgy"	Mark Barnard	Jamie Lennox & Louis Waymouth	11 April 2011
Eddie has a big maths test at school but, upon learning that Nick is ill, he pretends to be ill as well so he can play with the Monsters all day. But when Kate casually remarks there "must be a bug going round" the Monsters become terrified and begin taking drastic action to avoid this bug.
15	"Shiny Stuff"	Peter Cudlipp	Laurence Rickard & George Sawyer	12 April 2011
The Monsters become obsessed with shiny objects and once Eddie introduces them to money, and how it can be obtained, they start their own business so they can earn their own "shiny stuff". However, they soon take things too far and their enterprise ends up causing repercussions for the company Nick works for.
16	"Staycation"	Peter Cudlipp	Matt Leys & Martin Trenaman	13 April 2011
The Carlsons are preparing for a dream two-week holiday in Mexico but Eddie is unwilling to leave the Monsters on their own for so long. So, to try and make Eddie happy, Norman eats their passports. Although they are initially dejected, the family decide to still have their holiday, but at home instead and with three monsters to help to add to the fun.
17	"Teenage Dream Boy"	Mark Barnard	Mark Grant	14 April 2011
The Monsters are preparing for a special event. Fiend tells Eddie that every one-hundred years, Norman changes into something else but they never know what it will be beforehand. On this particular occasion, he turns into a teenage boy and escapes the basement. This happens on the same evening that Kate and Nick are having their new neighbours over for dinner, leading Angela to mistake him for their son…
18	"Monster on Top"	Mark Barnard	Laurence Rickard	15 April 2011
Eddie goes away for a weekend school trip and the Monsters are left feeling lost without their leader. Fiend initially proclaims himself as the new "King of the Monsters" but Angela persuades Haggis and Norman that they shouldn't let Fiend boss them around. This leads to each of the Monsters launching their own political campaign of why they should be the new King, resulting in a lot of annoyance for the family.
19	"Monstrously Good Cookies"	Peter Cudlipp	Simon Racioppa & Richard Elliott	18 April 2011
Kate is preparing for a cookie competition and gives the rest of the family strict instructions to stay away. Naturally, they all ignore this and, unbeknownst to Kate, some of Norman's fur ends up in her cookie mix. She then wins the competition and lands a spot on a top cooking show. Already feeling the pressure of being on TV, she then learns the truth behind her success…
20	"Quality Time"	Peter Cudlipp	Mark Huckerby & Nick Ostler	19 April 2011
No one in the family has time to play with the monsters due to various reasons. This leads to them believe that 'time' is their enemy so they steal all the clocks in the house, making the family incredibly late for work/school the next day. In response to this Nick buys a, rather terrifying, grandfather clock.
21	"Next Big Thing"	Mark Bernard	Laurence Rickard	20 April 2011
After watching one of Kate's appearances on a cooking show, which goes disastrously wrong, the Monsters decide to launch their own TV network. They begin filming the family as they go about their day-to-day activities and want to report on stories outside. So to keep them indoors, Eddie convinces them there is another monster in the house called "Jamumzy". Meanwhile, Kate's cooking disaster makes her an internet sensation but for all the wrong reasons.
22	"The Fall Out"	Mark Bernard	Mark Grant	21 April 2011
Eddie's birthday is approaching and, after learning about the concept of birthdays, the Monsters begin bickering about what to get for him. This then leads to a full-scale argument between them in which they are physically attacking one another. This upsets Eddie and threatens to ruin his birthday celebrations...
23	"Chain Gang"	Peter Cudlipp	James Bachman	22 April 2011
Eddie is going out to perform a magic show at his school. This inspires Fiend to don his own magical act. He becomes "The Amazing Fienduccio" and convinces Angela to help with one of his tricks. However this results in her and Norman being chained together. To make matters worse, Angela's school friend Steven is coming over to watch a film with her for their Drama class.
24	"Swap Fever"	Peter Cudlipp	Andy Watts	25 April 2011
Eddie tells the monsters about swapping "teeny pets", the free toys that come in cereal boxes. However Fiend and Haggis soon become unhealthily obsessed with them. Meanwhile, Norman is injured after helping Angela retrieve a heavy trunk from the top cupboard of her room. Feeling guilty, she lets him use her bed and starts nursing him.
25	"Alone Together"	Lynn Hegarty	Tom Basden & Sam Leifler	26 April 2011
The Carlsons are going away for the weekend to visit Kate's mother. Just before they go, they have a new burglar alarm fitted but the men who installed it are burglars themselves and are planning using the Carlsons house to store their stolen goods for the weekend. The Monsters are initially terrified but, upon realizing that they are the meant to be the scary ones, they concoct a plan to deal with these "bugglers".
26	"Monstersitter"	Lynn Hegarty	Jamie Lennox & Louis Waymouth	27 April 2011
Kate and Nick are going out and are leaving Angela and Eddie in the care of a new babysitter, Pauline. She proves to be very strict and is acting very suspiciously. They initially suspect of her of being a thief but soon discover that she is actually a monster hunter!

NOTE: Only Series 2 Episodes 1-7 were broadcast in HD on BBC HD in Spring 2011 and Series 1 Episodes 1–4 on CBBC HD throughout December 2013, although all the episodes were filmed in HD. Series 1 episodes 5-13 were aired from 27 February until 11 March 2015. They were aired on CBBC HD.

== Home media ==
The full series of Me and My Monsters was released as a box set in Germany and Switzerland. Also in Norway and Sweden. In Australia, there has been a DVD release of Me and My Monsters called Series 1: Episodes 1–7. As the title says it contains the first seven episodes only.

== International broadcasts ==
Country	Channel	Premiere date	Dubbing / Subtitles
Israel	Arutz HaYeladim	1 September 2011	Hebrew subtitles
Portugal	RTP 2	17 December 2011	Portuguese subtitles
Brazil	Gloob; TV Cultura	15 May 2012; 19 May 2012	Portuguese dubbing
Hungary	M2	11 January 2014	Hungarian dubbing
Italy	Frisbee	4 June 2012	Italian dubbing
Poland	Teletoon+	31 October 2012	Polish lector
Serbia, (Bosnia and Herzegovina) B&H (North Macedonia) Macedonia, Montenegro	Ultra TV	2013	Serbian dubbing
Argentina	Telefe	3 November 2012	American Spanish dubbing
Qatar	JeemTV	2013	Arabic subtitles
Turkey	Kidz TV	2012	Turkish dubbing
Mexico	Once TV	2013	American Spanish dubbing
Greece	N1	14 July 2014	Greek subtitles
Vietnam	SAM - BTV11, An Viên - BTV9; ANT - BPTV3; VTVCab 8 - Bibi	2015; 2021; 2013	Vietnamese dubbing
