= Tiger, Blood in the Mouth =

2016 Spanish drama film directed by Hernán Belón

- Film poster
- Spanish: Sangre en la boca
- Directed by: Hernán Belón
- Written by: Hernán Belón; Marcelo Pitrola
- Starring: Leonardo Sbaraglia; Eva De Dominici; Érica Bianchi
- Distributed by: Netflix
- Release date: 25 August 2016
- Running time: 97 minutes
- Countries: Argentina; Italy
- Language: Spanish

Tiger, Blood in the Mouth (Spanish: Sangre en la boca) is a 2016 film directed by Hernán Belón, written by Hernán Belón and Marcelo Pitrola and starring Leonardo Sbaraglia, Eva De Dominici and Érica Bianchi.

== Plot ==
Ramón Alvia is a professional boxer who, although he has won several international championships, is old and is at the end of his career. He resists. In the gym, Ramon discovers among the young boxers Deborah, a beautiful girl.

== Cast ==
- Leonardo Sbaraglia as Ramón
- Eva De Dominici as Débora
- Érica Bianchi as Carina (as Erica Banchi)
- Osmar Núñez as Di Nucci
- Claudio Rissi as Mario
- Benicio Mutti Spinetta as Maxi
- Camila Zolezzi as Yanina
- Aldo Onofri as Peralta
- Richard Wagener as Cachi
- Diego Chavez as Diamante Saldías (as Diego "La Joya" Chaves)
- Erica Farías as Cuchila Rígoli (as Érica "La Pantera" Farías)
- Pablo Paoliello as Elvis Zambrano (as Pablo "El Elvis" Paoliello)
- Osvaldo Príncipi as Locutor Primera Pelea
- Marcelo Pitrola as Hombre de la AFIP
- Ana Laura Pérez as Maestra (as Ana Laura Pérez Pacor)

== Release ==
Tiger, Blood in the Mouth was released on 25 August 2016 in Argentina.
