= Divina, está en tu corazón =

- Also known as: Love Divina
- Genre: Telenovela
- Written by: Mario Schajris
- Starring: Laura Natalia Esquivel
- Countries of origin: Mexico; Argentina
- Original language: Spanish
- No. of seasons: 1
- No. of episodes: 60

Production
- Executive producers: Paula Granica1; Adrián Suar
- Producer: Pedro Ortiz de Pinedo
- Camera setup: Multi-camera
- Production companies: Televisa; Pol-ka Producciones; Federation Kids & Family

Original release
- Network: Canal 5* El Trece
- Release: 13 March – 15 July 2017

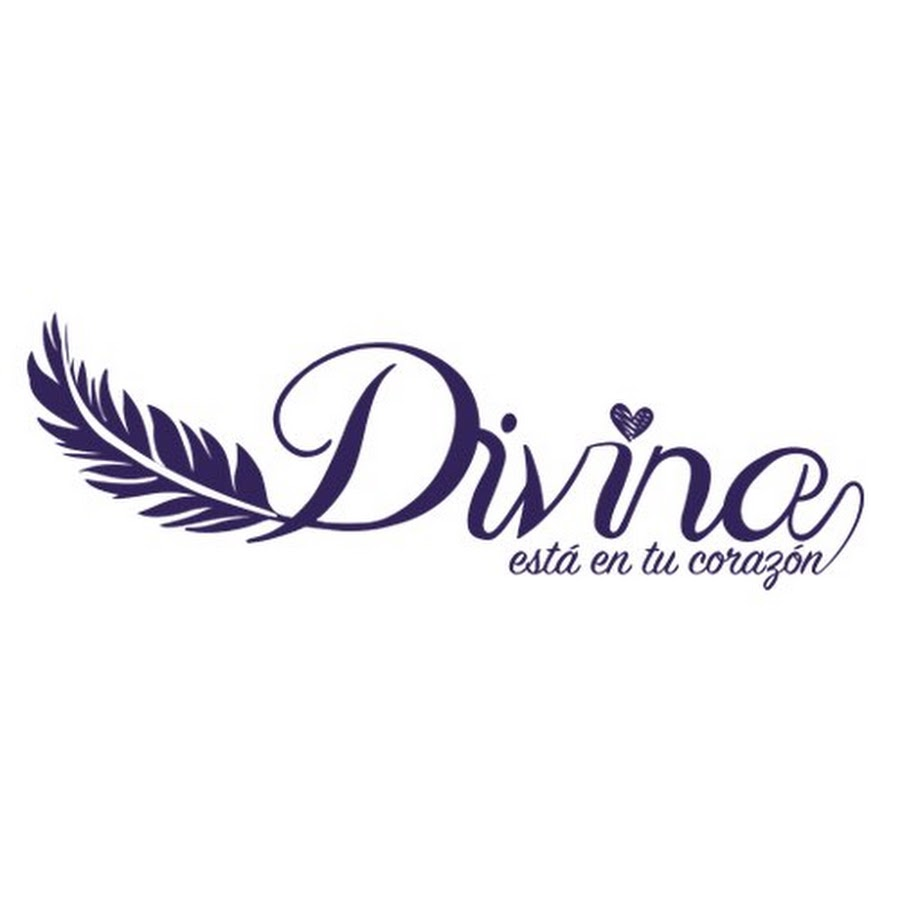

Divina, está en tu corazón, also known with the international title Love Divina, is a Spanish-language telenovela created by Mario Schajris and produced by Televisa, Pol-ka Producciones and Federation Kids & Family. It is a youth telenovela in the musical and comedy genres.

Due to the low ratings recorded in Argentina and Mexico, the idea of producing a second season was canceled: the final episode therefore lacks a conclusive outcome.

== Plot ==
Divina, está en tu corazón tells the story of a sweet and responsible teenager who grew up without a family. With a great knowledge of the life in the street, Divina takes a group of homeless children under her care. The mysterious Irene, who turns out to be the grandmother she lost a long time ago and who longs to approach Divina and repair her past mistakes, leads them all to live in her mansion and rescues them from social services. Divina, who secretly dreams of becoming a pop star, lives with her friends and the wealthy family of Irene - including Felipe, the love of her life - quickly forging new friendships as new and relentless rivalries.

== Cast ==
- Laura Esquivel as Divina
- Manuel Masalva as Felipe
- Ingrid Martz as Brisa
- Harold Azuara as Axel
- Ale Müller as Catalina
- Vanesa Butera as Soraya
- Nora Cárpena as Irene
- Matías Mayer as Pierre
- Thelma Fardin as Yanina
- Jenny Martínez as Sofía
- Julieta Vetrano as Meli
- Gabriel Gallichio as Ciro
- Marcelo D'Andrea as Fidel
- Abril Sanchez as Jazmín
- Camila Zolezzi as Olivia
- Leonel Hucalo as Lolo

== Soundtrack ==
Divina

Soundtrack album by Love Divina
- Released: 17 March 2017
- Recorded: 2016
- Genre: Pop
- Labels: Universal Music Argentina
- Producers: Eduardo Frigerio; Noel Schajris; Fernando López Rossi; Mario Schajris

Singles from Divina
- 1. "Corazón de Terciopelo" Released: January 9, 2017

Divina is the soundtrack by youth telenovela Love Divina, released on 17 March 2017 by Universal Music Argentina.

=== Singles ===
"Corazón de Terciopelo" was released as first and only single from the soundtrack on 9 January 2017.

=== Track listing ===
All tracks are written by Eduardo Frigerio, Federico San Millán, Mario Schajris and Fernando López Rossi.

Divina
No.	Title	Producer(s)	Length
1.	"Soy Divina" (performed by Laura Esquivel)	Eduardo Frigerio; Noel Schajris; Fernando López Rossi	2:42
2.	"Algo Mejor" (performed by Laura Esquivel)	Frigerio; Mario Schajris; López Rossi	3:32
3.	"Como Tu" (performed by Laura Esquivel and Manuel Masalva)	Frigerio; Mario Schajris; López Rossi	3:35
4.	"Corazón de Terciopelo" (performed by Laura Esquivel)	Federico San Millán; Mario Schajris	3:17
5.	"Desperté" (performed by Laura Esquivel)	Frigerio; Mario Schajris; López Rossi	3:17
6.	"Mariposa" (performed by Laura Esquivel)	Frigerio; Mario Schajris; López Rossi	3:43
7.	"Porque Estás En Mi Corazón" (performed by Laura Esquivel)	Frigerio; Noel Schajris; López Rossi	3:22
8.	"Se Que Volaré" (performed by Laura Esquivel)	Frigerio; Mario Schajris; López Rossi	3:25
9.	"Te Bajaré la Luna" (performed by Manuel Masalva)	Frigerio; Noel Schajris; López Rossi	3:27
10.	"Todo Empieza" (performed by Laura Esquivel)	Frigerio; López Rossi; Mario Schajris	3:16
11.	"Vale Imaginar" (performed by Laura Esquivel)	Frigerio; Mario Schajris; López Rossi	3:33
12.	"Amar es Amar" (performed by Laura Esquivel)	Frigerio; Mario Schajris; López Rossi	4:23
13.	"Disfruta la Vida" (performed by Laura Esquivel)	Frigerio; López Rossi; Mario Schajris	3:35

=== Release history ===
Country	Date	Format	Label
Argentina	17 March 2017	CD and Download music	Universal Music Argentina
Mexico	26 June 2017	CD	Universal Music Mexico
Italy	7 July 2017	CD	Warner Music Italy
France	23 February 2018	CD	Warner Music France
