= Vipo: Adventures of the Flying Dog =

- Genre: Animation
- Directed by: Ido Angel
- Composer: Nir Gedasi
- Country of origin: Israel
- Original language: English
- No. of seasons: 2
- No. of episodes: 26

Production
- Running time: 11 minutes
- Production company: Snowball VFX

Original release
- Network: Hop! Channel
- Release: 3 November 2007 – 26 April 2008

Vipo: Adventures of the Flying Dog is an animated television series for children, first aired in Israel. The show is also transmitted around the world and is accompanied by various kinds of merchandising.

== Overview ==
The stories revolve around a flying dog named Vipo. Having unusually long ears, he learns to fly and joins his two friends, Henry (the stork) and Betty (the toy cat) on a trip around the world.

== Main characters ==
- Vipo (the flying dog)
- Betty (the toy cat)
- Henry (the stork)

== Secondary characters ==
- Billy (the bull)
- Dr. Timmly (the guinea pig)
- Igor (the tiger)
- Nessy (the Loch Ness monster)
- Vincent Van Fox (the fox)
- Yao (the Chinese monkey)
- Yoshi (the mouse)
- Amadeus (the mouse)
- Amadeus' mice (the mice)
- Keanu (the rabbit)
- The Employee Rabbits (the rabbits)
- Jose (the donkey)
- Aurora (the cow)
- Blacky (the sheep)
- Alexander (the sheep)
- Dimitris (the goat) and others.

== Episodes ==
#	Title	Location	Description
1	"Musical Hiccups"	Salzburg, Austria	
2	"Saving the Empress' Crown"	Vienna, Austria	
3	"Betty Kidnapped"	Venice, Italy	
4	"A Trevi Fountain Wish Comes True"	Rome, Italy	
5	"Billy Must Win!"	Madrid, Spain	
6	"The Dog Barber of Seville"	Seville, Spain	
7	"The Kings of Croissants and Baguettes"	Paris, France	
8	"A Swiss Skiing Adventure"	Switzerland	
9	"The Munich Dog Competition"	Munich, Germany	
10	"Zoo Problems"	Hamburg, Germany	
11	"The Missing Windmill"	Amsterdam, Netherlands	
12	"The Ravens of the London Tower"	London, United Kingdom	
13	"Nessy's Kilt"	Scotland, UK	
14	"The Lost Christmas Gifts"	Scandinavia	
15	"The Siberian Tiger is Hungry"	Moscow, Russia	
16	"The Animal Olympics"	Athens, Greece	
17	"A Pyramid Mystery"	Egypt	
18	"King Congo"	Africa	
19	"The Elephant with Bad Memory"	India	
20	"The Koala and the Kangaroo"	Australia	
21	"The Crocodile Who Lost His Teeth"	Brazil	
22	"The Maya Treasure Mystery"	Mexico	
23	"Uncle Florence"	New York, United States	
24	"Akiro's Friends"	Japan	
25	"The Chinese Ninja Test"	China	
26	"Home Sweet Home"	Vipoland	

== Script ==
The scripts for twenty six episodes were written by Ido Angel, who also directed the show.

== Production ==
The show was produced during 2004–2007 by animation and visual effects studio, Snowball VFX, in collaboration with animation studio Crew 972. Original score music was composed & arranged by Nir Gedasi & Niv Golan.

== Merchandising ==
The manufacturer and distributor of its diverse products is Vipo Land Inc., who distribute products such as: plush animal toys, books and booklets, 3D animated Vipo movies, audio book CDs & music CDs, DVDs, games, accessories and the Vipo baby-products line.

== Broadcasting ==
In Japan, it aired on TBS, Tokyo MX, and WOWOW. In Hungary, it aired on Gerje TV, M2, and RTL Klub. In Turkey, it premiered on ATV, Show, and Star, along with Kidz TV. In Brazil, it premiered on Escola and ZooMoo. In Spain, TVE premiered the show. It also aired in Latin America
