= Thelma Fardin =

Argentine actress

Thelma Fardín
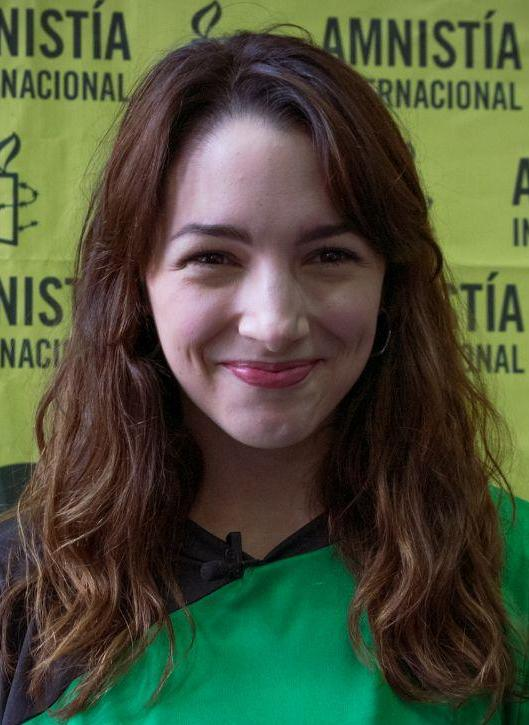
- Born: Thelma Inés Fardin; October 24, 1992 (age 33); Bariloche, Río Negro, Argentina
- Occupation: Actress

Thelma Inés Fardin (Spanish pronunciation: [ˈtelma faɾˈðin]; born October 24, 1992) is an Argentine actress.

== Biography ==
Thelma Fardin began her career in 1998 in the soap opera Cabecita, which stars Laura Olivia. In 1999, she appeared in the film La edad del sol, by Soledad Pastorutti and later in several television series including: Los simuladores from 2002 to 2003, Tiempo final from 2000 to 2002, The Nanny as a host, and La Tarde Dibujando Chicos Argentinosin 2005. Later, she participated in her first work of theater Pequeño Ghost. In 2003, she took part in Click and in the same year she appeared in Dádiva of a wandering soul. In 2006 she acted in the telenovela Sos mi vida, where she played the role of Laura, the adopted daughter of the character played by Facundo Arana.

At the beginning of 2007, she modeled in the magazine Beauty and models. After participating in Patito Feo in the role of Josefina Beltran, she continued in the musical version from 2007 to 2008. In November 2007, she was featured on the cover of Tweens magazine. In March 2010, she involved in 30 episodes of Consentidos and remained until the end of production.

== Accusation against Juan Darthés ==
In December 2018, inspired by a book written by Argentine writer Belén López Peiró, Fardin filed charges against actor Juan Darthés for sexual assault and rape in Nicaragua in 2009, when he was 45 and she was 16. The event would have taken place in a hotel in Nicaragua, when the cast of Patito Feo was making an international tour. She announced it during a press conference, joined by a statement signed by several Argentine actresses.

== Works ==
=== Television ===
- Sos mi vida (2006)
- Patito Feo (2007–2008)
- Consentidos (2009–2010)
- Dance! La Fuerza del Corazón (2011)
- Somos familia (2014)
- Guapas (2014)
- Soy Luna (2016–2017)
- Divina, está en tu corazón (2017)
- Kally's Mashup (2018)
