= Cumbia Ninja =

Colombian television series

- Genre: Adventure; Drama; Supernatural drama; Mystery; Thriller
- Created by: Andrés Gelós
- Starring: Ricardo Abarca; Brenda Asnícar; Ruddy Rodríguez; Rubén Zamora; Christian Meier; Nicolás Rincón; Ignacio Meneses; Julio Nava; Sebastián Rendón; Albi De Abreu; Víctor Jiménez; Miguel Rodarte; Natalia Reyes; Cristina Umaña
- Country of origin: Colombia
- Original language: Spanish
- No. of seasons: 3
- No. of episodes: 45 (list of episodes)

Production
- Executive producers: Nelson Martínez; María Gowland
- Producers: Anthony López; Natacha Caravia; Luis Langlemey
- Production locations: Bogotá, Colombia; Tanum Municipality, Mexico
- Cinematography: Felipe Martínez; Riccardo Gabrielli
- Camera setup: Red Two; single-camera
- Running time: 41–45 minutes
- Production companies: Fox Networks Group; Fox Telecolombia

Original release
- Network: Fox
- Release: August 5, 2013 – December 17, 2015

Cumbia Ninja is a Colombian mystery drama television series created by Andrés Gelós for Fox Latin America. It broadcast in Colombia from September 5, 2013 to December 17, 2015. The series stars Ricardo Abarca and Brenda Asnicar.

On August 29, 2013, for the first season, Fox green lighted 13 episodes. The series got generally positive reviews from the press and the public, and got renewed for two more seasons. The second season premiered on October 2, 2014 and ended on April 30, 2015. On October 29, 2015, the third and last season of the series premiered.

== Plot ==
The series tells the story of Juana Carbajal and Nicolás "Hache" Acuña, two kids with completely different lives in many ways, but destiny will bring them together. After living tragic moments in their lives, such as the loss of important people for both, they are chosen by Sungaku, an ancient God of the Mesoamerican civilization and the Aztec culture, to protect the important legacy and secrets about their culture, and discover the true meaning of life, as both must face and overcome various types of problems.

=== Season 1 ===
Juana Carbajal is a rich teenager and daughter of important businessman Víctor Carbajal. She is a girl who has led a life of money and without needs, including an overprotective mom and two younger siblings. But when her family is killed by hit men sent by her own uncle, León Carbajal, she must live with her nanny Elba Paez, the only survivor of the massacre, changing her name to Nieves, as well as changing her image completely to look like a street teenager.

Nicolás "Hache" Acuña is a young man who lives in "La Colina", a humble and troubled neighborhood, with a dream of being a singer. Hache is discovered by Willy Vega, a famous manager, during the concert of the band "The Pin-Piranhas" and decides to become the great leader of a new band called : "Cumbia Ninja", which would replace the other band after its members suffered a serious accident. The members of the band are : Chopín, the keyboard player; Bitbox, the bassist; Karate, the guitarist; and Tumba, the drummer; and Hache, the singer. During the band's first concert, the murder of the Carbajal and Chico family, Hache's brother and leader of the gang "El Cruce", occurred, so Hache must assume the role of gang leader, but taking on this responsibility becomes difficult for him as he is also trying to lead his new musical band. His first song in honor of his little brother, made Sungaku, an ancient god, wake up after a thousand years of slumber under the ancient Chinese house of La Colina, where Juana and Hache's paths come together, marking the start of a deep romance between the two. Nieves infiltrates the house of León Carbajal to find evidence against him for murdering his family. Hache, meanwhile, confronts the leader of the enemy gang, Salmón, who suspects he's involved with his brother's death.

Nieves is discovered by Ítalo, a trusted man from León, who falls in love with her. Ítalo, upon discovering the relationship between Nieves and Hache, decides to seduce Nieves at all costs, even if needing to kill for it. Salmon, his girlfriend Talita, and his partner Jhon Alex, discover the secret that lies under the ancient Chinese house of Xiang Wu, the teacher, guide and mentor of the "Cumbia Ninja" and caretaker of god Sungaku. After several events, Nieves decides to leave Hache to go with Italo, who convinces her to go by telling her that he has kidnapped her best friend Úrsula, who he alleges is slowly dying, leaving Hache with a broken heart. Master Wu finally makes the "Cumbia Ninja" meet Sungaku, telling him that trouble is ahead and that they must protect the dragon with their lives, and that the secret must not fall into the wrong ears.

=== Season 2 ===
León Carbajal, the villain of the story, will seek along Ítalo the secret of El Dorado to become richer and in turn take revenge on La Colina. Juana, to save her best friend Úrsula from the clutches of Ítalo, will have to reveal her true identity and at the same time pretend she lost her memory. This causes Hache to begin to doubt Juana and wonder if the love between each other was true. Juana has to live with her uncle Leon but she is still looking for evidence that incriminates him as the murderer of her family, which will also serve later to obtain answers about Chico's death. The boys of "Cumbia Ninja" will have a new manager, Felix Villalba, who will replace Willy as he left with Úrsula away from Ítalo. But, Felix has a double personality and a dark secret that threatens to sink the band. Sungaku teaches the Cumbia Ninja crew the "Five Impossible Attacks", which they will have to use against their enemy. Joan will face a fight between her thirst for revenge and her heart. Hache will lead "El Cruce" more than ever and finally end "Los 2200" once and for all, mainly with Salmon and find out that Juana never lost her memory and that he has always remained in her mind and that she loves him. He also learns about the connection between the death of Chico and Juana's family, mainly with his father, Víctor Carbajal. Jhon Alex will die betrayed by Talita, who proclaims herself as the boss of "La Colina", but Carmenza, reaped by the fury and suffering of knowing that Talita killed her son Chico, will put an end to the leader of "the 2200" crew. The remaining gang members of the bands "Domix" and "the 2200" will make a peace deal and join "El Cruce", and help Hache fight his final battle against Ítalo, who has kidnapped Juana. During the day of the "Battle of the Bands" show, the Cumbia Ninja crew are disqualified when they encounter a major problem : Leon finds the pyramid, but falls into the ambush of Juana and Hache, who with Sungaku, will make Leon receive his deserved punishment, while the Cumbia Ninja give a great performance in "La Cima", against the rival band, "Globulina". Finally, Leon is arrested, Juana and Hache distance themselves again, while Felix begins to prepare his revenge against Sungaku.

=== Season 3 ===
A year after Chico's death, La Colina is at peace. Cumbia Ninja return as great idols of music, with Jessica now being a member of the band after Bitbox left. Hache still feels that the neighborhood, the band and especially Sungaku still expect more from him. But since he let Juana go, nothing matters to him, not even music. Hache feels responsible for everything that has been going on. In turn, Juana also did not get the peace she expected. His passing through La Colina left her broken inside and returning to her previous life is not enough. Without love and without a vengeance plot to drive her to move on, Juana is lost in the excesses of a rich heiress, endangering her life. Juana is in a stage of much self-destruction and amidst an identity crisis, but finally she will find a guide, someone who will help her move forward: Félix, who will advise her to continue with her plan of revenge against those that caused the death of her family, making her believe that the culprit was not Leon, but Sungaku's secret. Leon will rot in jail until Balam's power will help him be respected there. It finally awakens, after being helped by Félix, and will seek revenge on the Cumbia Ninja crew. Now a hidden power appears from the shadows and both come to discover the truth of the mysterious force that caused the tragic events in La Colina and the Carbajal family, the force that makes them adversaries. Félix will train Juana with the power of the Jaguar to make her his successor. In turn, Xiang Wu will train Hache with the power of the Dragon for the next battle. Leon will have his due and will be killed in jail after betraying Balam. It will be revealed that Félix is actually Sungaku's ancestral enemy, the Jaguar.

Balam persuades Juana to end her relationship with Hache because he possesses the power of the Dragon; during the final fight Juana hopes to die at the hands of the Dragon so she can be released, but Hache refuses to hurt Juana, therefore, Juana is dropped from the bridge where they are, Hache dives after her, and when they impact together, it affects all the characters, who lose their powers granted by The Dragon, the power of the Jaguar and the Dragon leave their bodies thanks to Balam who summons prayers invoking the battle between both cosmic powers. Balam tries to possess them, but when he is about to achieve it, Ítalo stabs him in the back and murders him and the powers vanish. Juana and Hache wake up after the impact, alive but without any power, and outside of La Colina the police is waiting for them, and inform the couple that the Carbajal family murder case is finally closed. The police take Ítalo under custody. Everything ends well between Juana and Hache, who travel together to find peace and prepare to be the successor of the Dragon and spread the ashes of Xiang Wu. They bid the master farewell and then embark on a journey to where life may take them.

== Cast ==
=== Main ===
- Ricardo Abarca in the role of Nicolás "Hache" Acuña.
- Brenda Asnicar in the role of Juana Carbajal / Nieves.
- Nicolás Rincón in the role of Chopín.
- Sebastian Rendón in the role of Carlos "Karate" Wu.
- Julio Nava in the role of Camilo "Tumba" Paez.
- Ignacio Meneses in the role of Bitbox. (S1 and S2)
- Ruddy Rodriguez in the role of Carmenza Acuña.
- Víctor Jiménez in the role of Xiang Wu.
- Rubén Zamora in the role of León Carbajal.
- Carla Giraldo in the role of Talita. (S1 and S2)
- Juan Diego Sanchez in the role of John Alex (S1 and S2)
- Albi De Abreu in the role of Italo.
- Miguel Rodarte in the role of Félix Villalba / Sr. Balam. (S1 and S2)
- René Figueroa in the role of El Dragón Sungaku (voice).

== Series overview ==
Series	Episodes	Originally aired	
Series	Episodes	Series premiere	Series finale
1	13	5 September 2013	28 December 2013
2	16	2 October 2014	20 December 2014
3	16	29 October 2015	17 December 2015

== Production ==
=== Development ===
In January 2015, Fox announced the cast of the series including actors Brenda Asnicar and Ricardo Abarca were. The first season series premiered on September 5, 2013, and ended on November 28, 2013, with 13 episodes aired on Thursdays. In a prinicipio it was scheduled only 13 episodes. But due to the success, Fox decided to renew the series for a second season.

Cumbia Ninja is the first scripted original series on FOX. The series creator and showrunner Andrés Gelós, who also directed the pilot and other episodes.

The first part of the second season began on October 2, 2014, and ended on November 20, 2014, with eight episodes aired. The second part was scheduled to begin on January 22, 2015, until March 19, 2015. But according to Fox, there was a change of plans and then announced that the second part aired from March 2015.

On December 3, 2014, Fox confirmed the third season of the series and began filming on January 15, 2015. The third season premiered on October 29, 2015, and ended on December 17, 2015.
