= Multiteatro =

Theater complex in Buenos Aires, Argentina

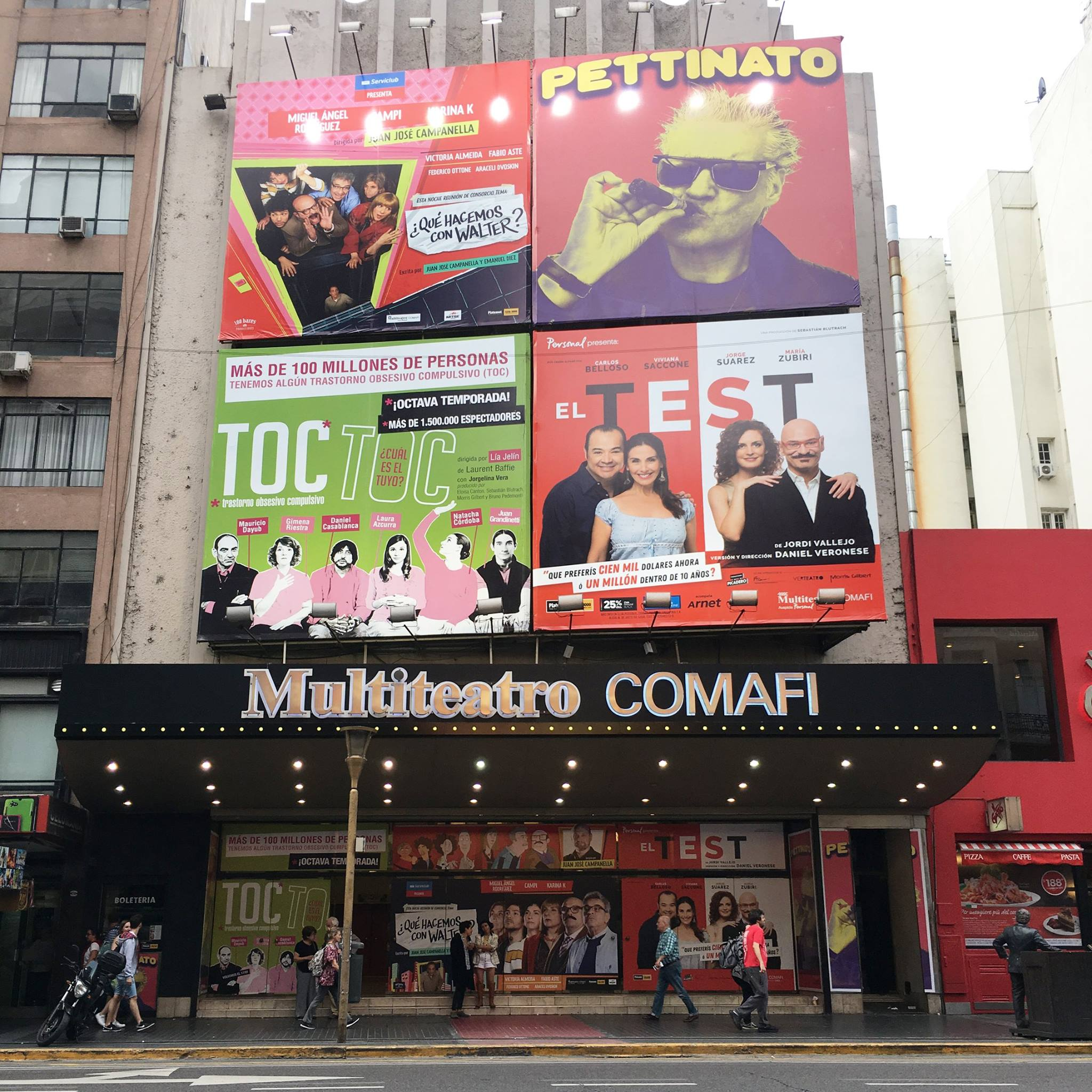

Multiteatro is a theater complex located at 1283 Avenida Corrientes, in Buenos Aires, Argentina on the site of the historical Teatro Smart and Teatro and Cinema Blanca Podestá.

== History ==
=== Teatro Smart ===
In 1914, the Italian entrepreneur Domingo Perrupato erected the Teatro Smart Palacio at 1274 Avenida Corrientes. In 1921, it was remodeled and in 1924, it was acquired by Blanca Podestá and her husband, Alberto Ballerini, who decided to move the theater to a new location. The original site became the Teatro Cómico, now the Teatro Lola Membrives, and the new location, on the opposite side of the street, became the Teatro Smart. Many of the stars of the Golden Age of Argentine Theater, including Luis Arata, Amelia Bence Olinda Bozán, Gloria Guzmán, Mecha Ortiz Enrique Muiño, Florencio Parravicini, Juan Carlos Thorry performed there.

=== Teatro Blanca Podestá ===
In 1967, upon the death of Blanca Podestá, the theater was renamed in her honor as the Teatro Blanca Podestá. It was the first theater to bear the name of an actress. Throughout the 1970s, stage productions were held such as Coqueluche (1971-1972) with Ricardo Bauleo, Thelma Biral and Aurora Del Mar; Las brujas de Salem (1972-1974) with Alfredo Alcón, Norma Barcaicoa and Alicia Bruzzo; La idiota (1975) with Thelma Biral, Luis Medina Castro and Marta Cipriano; Lorenzaccio (1978) with Alfredo Alcón, Aldo Barbero, Rodolfo Bebán and Marta Bianchi; which continued into the 1980s with plays like Hotel Parliament (1986-1987) with Gerardo Romano, Arturo Maly, and Marta González.

The theater was taken over by Carlos Rottemberg, who announced in 2000 plans for a major renovation of the theater. His plans included increasing the number of seats from one room with 700 chairs to four rooms with capacity for 1376 seats.

=== Renaming ===
In March, 2001, Rottemberg announced the remodeled theater complex would open in April and be called the Multiteatro because no one remembers the people the buildings were historically named after. On 10 April 2001 amid dignitaries, city officials and stars like Mirtha Legrand, Norma Pons, Linda Peretz, Graciela Dufau and China Zorrilla, the new theater opened. In one room "Pingüinos" with Pablo Rago and Valentina Bassi was premiering and the other salons featured "Brujas" with Norma Pons, "Había una vez" a one-man show starring China Zorrilla, and "Los galanes peinan canas" directed by Manuel González Gil and starring Rodolfo Bebán, Guillermo Bredeston and Claudio García Satur.
