= Por amarte así (TV series) =

Argentine telenovela

- Genre: Telenovela
- Created by: Martín Kweller; Claudio Lacelli; Carolina Parmo
- Directed by: Viviana Guadarrama; Mauro Scandolari
- Starring: Gabriel Corrado; Brenda Asnicar; Gastón Soffritti; Catherine Fulop
- Opening theme: "Por Amarte Así" performed by Ana Isabelle and Cristian Castro
- Country of origin: Argentina
- Original language: Spanish
- No. of episodes: 60

Production
- Executive producer: Maru Mosca
- Producer: Daniel Stigliano
- Production locations: Buenos Aires, Argentina
- Cinematography: Martín Kweller; Leo Besi
- Camera setup: Multi-camera
- Running time: 42-45 minutes
- Production companies: Endemol, Azteka Films (a.k.a. Ganas de Hacer Ficcion)

Original release
- Network: Telefe
- Release: November 14, 2016 – February 3, 2017

Related
- Educando a Nina; Me declaro culpable

Por amarte así (English: Loving You) is an Argentine telenovela produced by Endemol and Azteka Films (a.k.a. Ganas de Hacer Ficcion) for Telefe. It premiered on November 14, 2016 and ended on February 3, 2017.

The series stars Gabriel Corrado as Francisco, Aylin Prandi as Luz, Catherine Fulop as Fátima, Maite Zumelzú as Malvina, Brenda Asnicar and Gaston Soffritti.

== Plot summary ==
Francisco Olivetti (Gabriel Corrado) is a wealthy attorney whose career is centered on the practice of law. He becomes involved in the case of Luz Quiroja (Aylin Prandi), a woman accused after disconnecting her terminally ill husband from life support in accordance with his stated wish to end his suffering. Olivetti takes on the task of establishing her innocence.

Mercedes Olivetti (Brenda Asnicar), Francisco and Fatima’s daughter, is the only reason why they continue being married. She is spoiled but good girl. She has strong values that will be broken on a wild night with alcohol and drugs when her car crashes and wounds Manuel, a young promising football star that was about to be hired by a famous European football team.

Manuel Correa (Gastón Soffritti) ends up in a wheelchair with his life destroyed and Mercedes carries the guilt. Her mother and boyfriend will manipulate her to keep silent about the accident in order to avoid jail and destroy the whole family.

Mercedes and Manuel will start seeing each other and fall in love. Mercedes will hide from him the fact that she is the reason for his condition. Not only will their love be threatened, but also the love of Francisco and Luz will be when Fatima discovers them.

== Cast ==
=== Main cast ===
- Gabriel Corrado - Francisco Olivetti
- Aylin Prandi - Luz Quiroga
- Catherine Fulop - Fátima Pellegrini
- Brenda Asnicar - Mercedes Olivetti
- Gastón Soffritti - Manuel Correa

=== Recurring cast ===
- Facundo Gambandé - Santiago Ponce
- Olivia Viggiano - Noel García
- Sergio Surraco - Joaquín Quintana
- Héctor Bidonde - Valerio Pellegrini
- Sergio Goycoechea - Richard Olivetti
- Esmeralda Mitre - Camila
- Nacho Gadano - Javier Ponce
- Santiago Caamaño - Tiziano Fonseca
- Marisa Bentacur - Mercedes Correa
- Lucas Corrado- Peter
- Agustina Mindlin - Inés
- Nicolás Bouzas - Rodrigo
- Carolina Casal - Rita
- Lula Ocampo- Violetta
- Catarina Spinetta - Laura
- Romina Giardina - Miriam
- Valeria Degenaro - Lía
- Agustín Lecouna - Rodolfo
- Romina Giardina - Miriam
- Diego Alonso Gómez - Gastón Núñez
- Naím Sibara - Pablo Suárez

== Production ==
Production of the series began on October 3, 2016. It is the first production of Endemol, Azteka Films (a.k.a. Ganas de Hacer Ficcion) with Telefe, created by Claudio Lacelli and Carolina Parmo and produced by Endemol.

The production began filming in Buenos Aires, Argentina. The series was recorded at the Estudios Mayor in Palermo Hollywood in the city of Buenos Aires, Argentina, although some scenes from the series were recorded in the city's surrounding area. At the beginning of production, the actors were Gabriel Corrado, Aylin Prandi, Catherine Fulop, Brenda Asnicar, Gastón Soffritti, Maite Zumelzú, Héctor Bidonde, Sergio Goycoechea, Sergio Surraco, Olivia Viggiano, Facundo Gambandé, among others.
