= Consentidos =

- Genre: Youth, Comedy
- Starring: Claribel Medina; Marcelo de Bellis; Natalie Pérez; Michel Noher; Macarena Paz; Mauricio Dayub; Mariana Prommel; Mario Guerci; Fabio Di Tomaso; Pepe Monje; Rodolfo Samso; Daniel Di Biase; Julio Viera; Tomás de las Heras; Micaela Riera; Andrés Gil; Valentino Giovanetti; Christian Puebla; Eva De Dominici; Paloma González Heredia; Manuel Ramos; Ivan Paz; Agustina Palma; Lola Morán
- Country of origin: Argentina
- Original language: Spanish
- No. of seasons: 1
- No. of episodes: 147

Original release
- Network: El trece
- Release: 9 November 2009 – 8 July 2010

Consentidos (translation of: Spoileds) is an Argentine children's comedy in daily television series that was broadcast on Channel 13, and produced by Ideas del Sur, together with Televisa. The series premiered on 9 November 2009 and ended on 8 July 2010. It starred Natalie Pérez, Michel Noher, Claribel Medina and Marcelo de Bellis. The main antagonistic characters are: Mariana Prommel and Macarena Paz.

== Synopsis ==
Tormented by her memories and in search of her sister, Luna Guzmán goes to work at a boarding school, where study rich and spoiled children that by name takes the Mastery School where she discovers that her lost sister is Miranda, the daughter of Victoria, the director. Miranda is a spoiled, capricious and selfish girl. The first day that comes to work Luna is the day of her birthday and treats her badly thought that Luna is only a fit. Alejo the lost son of the director also enters there as a gym teacher, the story takes through Luna, Miranda, Alejo, Ivo, Valentina, Benja and Candy and the entry of new students to the Mastery School and the truth of who they are. The story ends with a double wedding and the truth of each one.

== Cast ==
=== Main ===
- Claribel Medina as Victoria Mujica de García
- Marcelo de Bellis as Guillermo Guzmán
- Natalie Pérez as Luna Guzmán / Luna Moreno
- Michel Noher as Alejo Briceño / Diego García Mujica
- Macarena Paz as Renata De Briceño / Lucila
- Mauricio Dayub as Patricio
- Mariana Prommel as Rita
- Mario Guerci as Nano
- Fabio Di Tomaso as Felipe de la Fuente
- Pepe Monje as Diego Miraflores
- Rodolfo Samso as Rolando Marconi
- Daniel Di Biase as Juan Moreno
- Julio Viera as Pedro Alonso
- Tomás de las Heras as Max
- Micaela Riera as Valentina
- Andrés Gil as Ivo
- Valentino Giovanetti as Ulises
- Christian Puebla as Paul
- Eva De Dominici as Gal
- Paloma González Heredia as Miranda García Mujica
- Manuel Ramos as Toto
- Ivan Paz as Juanse
- Agustina Palma as Julieta
- Lola Morán as Emma Gómez Rañero

=== Teen and child cast ===
- Agustina García Tedesco as Serena
- Luciano Papasidero as Dino
- Lucas Verstraeten as Tom González Crespo
- Delfina Capalbo as Federica
- Ramiro López Silveyra as Rafa
- Antonella Sabatini as Celeste Regueiro
- Nazareno Antón as Gerónimo
- Franco Gil Franchina as Nicolás
- Chiara Francia as Lila
- Tomás Ross as Benjamín
- Luciano Martínez Motta as Bautista
- Lourdes Mansilla as Candy
- Maya Schojet as Pilar
- Juana Barros as Clara
- Tupac Larriera as Tupac
- Marcio Mansilla as Augusto
- Brian Sichel as Rodrigo
- Julieta Poggio as Olivia
- Thelma Fardin as Luz
- Thiago Batistuta as Martín
- Jaime Domínguez as Lisandro

== Seasons ==
Season	Episodes	Original premiere	Premiere
1	147	9 November 2009	8 July 2010
