= JoNaLu =

German children TV series

- Genre: Children's animation
- Country of origin: Germany
- Original language: German
- No. of seasons: 2
- No. of episodes: 26

Production
- Producer: Jan Bonath
- Production company: Scopas Medien

Original release
- Network: Kinderkanal; Nick Jr. Disney Jr.
- Release: April 6, 2010 – 2016

JoNaLu is a 2010 German computer-animated children's television series. The main characters are a male mouse named Jo, a female mouse named Naya, and a male ladybug named Ludwig (nicknamed Lu).

== See also ==
- List of German television series
