= Gachi Ferrari =

Argentine TV hostess

Graciela "Gachi" Ferrari (born 1954 in Buenos Aires) is an Argentine former model, actress and TV hostess, mostly for children-oriented audiences during the 1970s and 1980s.

Her girl-next-door looks was very popular with advertisers in the 1970s. She was also co-presenter of Telejuegos, El club de Anteojito y Antifaz and El Libro Gordo de Petete, a series of short television programs meant to educate and entertain children.
