= Peter Punk =

Argentine sitcom of children's genre

- Genre: Television series
- Directed by: Gustavo Cova; Eduardo Gondell
- Starring: Juan Ciancio; Gastón Vietto; Guido Pennelli; Lucía Pecrul; Franco Masini
- Country of origin: Argentina
- Original language: Spanish
- No. of seasons: 3
- No. of episodes: 94

Production
- Running time: 30 minutes
- Production company: Illusion Studios

Original release
- Network: Disney XD
- Release: 12 March 2011 – October 25, 2013

Peter Punk is an Argentine sitcom of children's genre, original Disney XD co-produced with Illusion Studios, broadcast since 2011 by Disney XD. The first trailer was aired in February 2011 on Disney Channel Latin America. It stars Juan Ciancio, Gastón Vietto, Guido Pennelli, Franco Masini and Lucía Pecrul.

== Synopsis ==
Peter is a fifteen-year-old teenager with friends, challenges and a punk family. His only problem is that he likes rock. He has a band called Rock Bones, in which he is the leader, vocalist and bassist. The band is made up of his friends: Seba (the drummer), Mateo (the guitarist), Lola (the sound engineer) and Iván (the manager) with whom he spends most of the day. They have pop enemies, the Pop Twins.

== Cast ==
- Juan Ciancio as Peter Punk, is a rock-loving teenager from a punk-loving family. He's 15 years old. He's positive and hopeful. Every time he has an idea, he conjures up an illusion and exaggerates the current situation. He generally associates a situation with his own imagination.
- Gastón Vietto as Mateo, is the band's guitarist. He's very insecure, even about his own decisions. He's humble and tries to keep the band together. He's the most loyal and trustworthy of them all.
- Guido Pennelli as Seba, is the band's drummer. He's Peter's best friend and the most energetic.
- Lucía Pecrul as Lola, is the band's sound technician. She has a secret crush on Peter and does everything for her friends. She's the smartest and most down-to-earth one.
- Franco Masini as Iván, is the manager of Rock Bones, he only thinks about girls and does everything to get a kiss, a date or anything that has to do with romance, but always in a clever and selfish way.
- Leo Trento as Vic Punk, is the father of Peter, Paty, and Joe. He's married to his former number 1 fan, Nancy. He's the most punkish member of the family. He was the frontman of a former punk band called "Punkmorroids." He's the owner of "Central Punk."
- Violeta Naón as Nancy Punk, She is the mother of Peter, Paty, and Joe. She constantly calls Peter "baby," a nickname that angers and embarrasses him. She does everything she can to help her children with their problems. She works as a hairdresser at Central Punk. Nancy is Vic's number 1 fan.
- Juana Barros as Paty Punk, She's Joe and Peter's younger sister. She's the most punkish daughter in the family. She's 11 years old. She's always involved in Peter's affairs, getting him into trouble or helping him out. She has a blog where she posts all the information she records about Rock Bones.
- Lucas Verstraeten as Joe Punk, He's Peter and Paty's older brother. He's 17 years old. He only cares about himself. He carries a mirror, his best friend, with him to look at himself and flatter himself. Although he doesn't like punk, he gets along very well with his parents and isn't bothered by the environment. He's always being chased by his many fans.
- Salo Pasik as Ray Punk, He's Joe, Peter, and Patty's grandfather, and Nancy's father-in-law. He often thinks about things he never thought about, and he also tends to forget things that happened just seconds ago.
- Brian and Joel Cazeneuve as Andy and Michael, Rock Bones' rivals, they always want to be better than them. Although they sometimes help Peter on adventures. They love pop music, wear colorful clothes, and sing catchy rhymes. They run their father's shop, "Central Pop."
