= List of programmes broadcast by Sahara One =

This is a list of television programmes formerly broadcast by Sahara One.

== Comedy series ==
- Bhagwaan Bachaaye Inko (2004)
- Don't Worry Ho Jayega (2000)
- GiLLi Danda (2003)
- Hi! Padosi... Kaun Hai Doshi? (2011)
- Hum Dono (2000)
- Hukum Mere Aaka (2003–2004)
- Ruby Duby Hub Dub (2004)
- Shubh Mangal Savadhan (2002–2004)

== Drama series ==
- Aakhir Bahu Bhi Toh Beti Hee Hai (2013–2014)
- Arzoo Hai Tu (2003–2004)
- Bitto (2010–2011)
- Buniyaad (2006)
- Chacha Chaudhary (2002–2004)
- Daaman (2001–2002)
- Do Lafzon Ki Kahani (2001)
- Doli Saja Ke (2007–2009)
- Draupadi (2002–2004)
- Ek Chutki Aasman (2010)
- Firangi Bahu (2013–2014)
- Ganga Kii Dheej (2010–2011)
- Ghar Aaja Pardesi (2013)
- Ghar Ek Sapnaa (2007–2009)
- Hamaari Beti Raaj Karegi (2010–2011)
- Haqeeqat (2001)
- Har Mod Par (2002)
- Hare Kkaanch Ki Choodiyaan (2005–2006)
- Haunted Nights (2012–2013)
- Isse Kehte Hai Golmaal Ghar (2004–2005)
- Jai Jai Jai Bajrang Bali (2011–2015)
- Jhilmil Sitaaron Ka Aangan Hoga (2012–2013)
- Jo Ishq Ki Marzi Woh Rab Ki Marzi (2009)
- Kaala Saaya (2011)
- Kagaar (2002–2004)
- Kagaz Ki Kashti (2002–2003)
- Kahani Chandrakanta Ki (2011–2012)
- Kahi To Milenge (2002–2003)
- Kaisi Laagi Lagan (2008–2009)
- Kamini Damini (2004–2005)
- Karishma - The Miracles of Destiny (2003–2004)
- Kesariya Balam Aavo Hamare Des (2009–2011)
- Kise Apna Kahein (2003)
- Kituu Sabb Jaantii Hai (2005–2007)
- Kohinoor (2005)
- Kucchh Pal Saath Tumhara (2003–2004)
- Kuch Apne Kuch Paraye (2006–2007)
- Kuchh Love Kuchh Masti (2004–2005)
- Main Aisi Kyunn Hoon (2007–2008)
- Malini Iyer (2004–2005)
- Masakali (2014–2015)
- Mata Ki Chowki (2008–2011)
- Mera Sasural (2008)
- Mr. & Mrs. Mishra (2009)
- Neeli Aankhen (2008)
- Neem Neem Shahad Shahad (2011–2012)
- Om Namah Narayan (2001–2002)
- Parchhaiyan (2002)
- Piya Ka Ghar Pyaara Lage (2011–2012)
- Prratima (2004–2005)
- Power Trip (2004–2005)
- Raat Hone Ko Hai (2004–2005)
- Rishton Ke Bhanwar Mein Uljhi Niyati (2011–2014)
- Ruby Duby Hub Dub (2004)
- Saath Rahega Always (2005–2006)
- Saathiya – Pyar Ka Naya Ehsaas (2004–2005)
- Sahib Biwi Gulam (2004)
- Sati...Satya Ki Shakti (2006)
- Shorr (2010–2011)
- Shubh Kadam (2009)
- Solhah Singaarr (2006–2008)
- Tujh Sang Preet Lagai Sajna (2012–2013)
- Virasaat (2002)
- Woh Rehne Waali Mehlon Ki (2005–2011)
- Zaara (2006–2008)
- Zameen Se Aassman Tak (2004)

== Reality/non-scripted programming ==
- Biggest Loser Jeetega (2007)
- Comedy Champions (2008)
- Fateh (2002)
- Hello (2003)
- Jjhoom India (2007–2008)
- Saas v/s Bahu (2008)
- Style Mantra (2004)
- Sur Kshetra (2012)

== Hindi dubbed series ==
=== Animated series ===
- Just Kids! shows (2002–2004)
  - Bhallu Sahab Ki Kahani
  - Denver, the Last Dinosaur
  - The Jungle Book
  - The Legend of Zorro
  - The New Adventures of Kimba The White Lion
  - Pocahontas
  - Sandokan
  - Christopher Columbus
  - Simba The King Lion
  - The Story of Cinderella
- Spacetoon Hour (2005–2006)
  - Baby & Me
  - Captain Tsubasa
  - Crush Gear Turbo
  - Enchanted Princess Party

== Films ==
- Phir Se (2005)
- Familywala (2014)
