= Just Kids! =

- Starring: Yash Pathak
- Country of origin: India
- Original language: Hindi

Production
- Running time: 60 minutes

Original release
- Network: Sahara One

Just Kids! (Hindi) is an Indian television programming block which aired on Sahara TV. The show was hosted by Yash Pathak and included various cartoon series like The Great Book Of Nature, Zorro, The Story Of Cinderella, Christopher Columbus, Sandokan, Denver - The Last Dinosaur, Jungle Book etc.

Most of these animated series were Italian-Japanese and translated into Hindi after Sahara TV has acquired from the internationally popular Mondo TV, telecast rights for 260 hours of animated children's programming. The titles include the famous Simba - The Lion, Cinderella, Zorro, Christopher Columbus, Sandokan and The Great Book Of Nature. Mondo TV has 25,000 hours of television content and is in international competition with Walt Disney.

Two of these shows were shown every day and Bhalu Sahab ki Kahani (The Great Book of nature) was shown at the end. This was one of the most watched kids show of that time.

== Series ==
- Bhallu Sahab Ki Kahani
- Christopher Columbus
- Denver, the Last Dinosaur
- The Jungle Book
- Simba The King Lion
- The Legend of Zorro
- Pocahontas
- Sandokan
- The Story of Cinderella

== See also ==
- List of programs broadcast by Sahara One
