= Mondo TV =

Italian production and television distribution company

Coordinates: 41.918383°N 12.502867°E

Mondo TV S.p.A.
- Type: Public
- Traded as: BIT: MTV
- Industry: Distribution; Publishing
- Founded: 1985; 41 years ago
- Founder: Orlando Corradi
- Headquarters: Via Brenta, 11, 00198 Rome, Italy; Production center: Via Monte Nero, 40–42, Collefiorito di Guidonia – km. 15 Via Nomentana – 00012 Guidonia, Rome, Italy
- Area served: Worldwide
- Key people: Matteo Corradi (president, CEO, CPO, and CSO); Carlo Marchetti (CFO)
- Products: Cartoons; Merchandising
- Revenue: ▲€16.50 million (2010)
- Operating income: ▲€0.36 million (2010)
- Net income: ▲€0.35 million (2010)
- Total assets: ▲€31.65 million (2010)
- Total equity: ▲€19.98 million (2010)
- Subsidiaries: Mondo TV France; Mondo TV Suisse
- Website: mondotv.it

Mondo TV S.p.A. is an Italian production and television distribution company. Founded by Orlando Corradi in 1985 and based in Rome, Mondo TV is a public company, quoted on the STAR segment of the Italian main stock exchange, Borsa Italiana.

It distributes and produces, on its own or in co-production with international networks, cartoon series and feature films for television and theatrical release. Mondo TV also operates in other related sectors such as music and audiovisual distribution, exploitation, media, publishing and merchandising, and is one of the few branches of Italian audiovisual production companies or groups active in markets outside Italy.

In April 2023, Squirrel Media acquired Mondo TV Studios.

In June 2024, Mondo TV was fined by the United States Department of the Treasury for "apparent violations" regarding that Mondo TV still continues to outsource their work to North Korea after the EU imposed sanctions on the country in 2013. As a result, the company has agreed to a settlement and to pay the fine.

== History ==
In 1964, Orlando Corradi and Kenichi Tominaga found DEA S.n.c., a company active in the audiovisual animation sector, with the aim of acquiring the rights to Japanese animated TV series for distribution in Italy and Europe.

In 1979 and 1980, respectively, Corradi and Tominaga created the companies Doro TV Merchandising for large-scale television networks, and Italian TV Broadcasting S.r.l., for smaller-size broadcasting. The period from the late 1970s to the early 1980s saw a rise in demand for Japanese animated TV series and the growth of the Italian television market. The two companies started distributing feature films, TV series and sports events. In 1985, Mondo TV S.r.l. was founded in order to produce animated TV series.

In 1990, Doro TV Merchandising created its first animated television series, The Jungle Book and Christopher Columbus. From 1992, Mondo TV undertook the production of animated television series. In late 1999, Mondo TV S.r.l. was transformed into a joint-stock company and acquired the 100% of the shares of Doro TV Merchandising S.r.l. On 28 June 2000, its shares made their debut on the Italian stock exchange, Borsa Italiana.

The 2000s saw Mondo TV expands its operations into complementary multimedia and publishing sectors, and its worldwide collaborations and strategic partnerships. Mondo Home Entertainment S.r.l., for the distribution of video and DVDs, and Mondo Licensing S.p.A., fcr merchandising and publishing, were both founded in 2001, followed by Mondo Home Entertainment S.p.A., quoted on the Expandi bourse on 28 February 2005, Moviemax, purchased by MHE in 2006, and MEG Mondo Entertainment Germany for home video distribution in Germany.

In September 2010, Mondo TV launched its own licensing agency in Italy, Mondo TV Consumer Products, dealing with the licensing, publishing and merchandising rights of properties owned by the group itself as well as third parties. The future will see Mondo TV Group building up its presence in sectors like home video, music, multimedia, children's books, interactive games, ecommerce, merchandising, computer and video games and publishing synergy with cartoon products.

By June 2023, Mondo TV decided to merge their Swiss production division Mondo TV Suisse with their French production subsidiary Mondo TV France. Six months later in December of that year, London completed the merger of its Swiss production division Mondo TV Suisse with its French production division Mondo TV France with the former being shuttered and its assets being folded into the French production division Mondo TV France as their new Tichio-based Swiss production branch.

=== Subsidiaries ===
The holding company, Mondo TV, has several incorporated subsidiaries:

- Mondo TV France: for the production distribution of television programmes in France and later Switzerland.
- Mondo TV Suisse: for the distribution of television programmes in Switzerland.

=== Production, international dubbing of pre-existing projects and distribution ===
The group's activities initially focused on the distribution of Japanese animated TV series in Italy. This involved dubbing, but not producing these projects. These projects would have already been finished and Mondo would have acquired an Italian distribution license to air Italian dubs of these series.

In 1989, the company expanded from distribution to distribution and production, and Doro TV Merchandising created its first television series, Jungle Book Shōnen Mowgli, a 52-episode series based on the 1894 collection of stories written by Rudyard Kipling, and Christopher Columbus, a 26-episode animated series based on the life of the Italian explorer and navigator. Nippon Animation produced these shows, while Mondo TV handled international distribution. Other such projects included Robin Hood, based on the outlaw in English folklore and released in 1990 and The Legend of Snow White, based on the Brothers Grimm's version of the classic fairy tale released in 1994, both being animated (and created before Mondo's entry into distribution) by Tatsunoko Productions.

In 1996, the studio released The Legend of Zorro, 52 episodes of about 26 minutes each based on the famous character created in 1919 by New York-based pulp writer Johnston McCulley. The series was produced by the animation department of the Japanese film, theater production, and distribution company Toho. Again, Mondo TV produced and distributed an Italian dub, the same as they did with another Tatsunoko series; Cinderella.

In the following years, Mondo TV released several animated series such as "Simba the Lion King" a 52-episode animated series, and the sequels "Simba Jr. goes to the World Cup" a 26-episode animated series and "Winner and the Golden Child" a 26-episode animated series, Jesus: A Kingdom Without Frontiers, co-produced with Institute of Antoniano, Pocahontas, a 26-episode animated series based on the Pamunkey Algonquian princess and Chief Powhatan's daughter from early American history, Sandokan: The Tiger of Malaysia, a 26-episode animated series co-produced with SEK Studio (a North Korean-based animation company), RAI, TF1 and Taurus Film based on the fictional pirate of the late 19th century created by Italian author Emilio Salgari, Albert the Wolf, a 52-episode animated series co-produced with Rai Trade based on the comic book series created by Guido Silvestri under the pseudonym of John Silver in 1974, and The Black Corsair, a 26-episode animated series based on the book by Emilio Salgari.

In 1999, Mondo TV participated to the International Animation Consortium for Child Rights, "Cartoons for Children's Rights", a collection of 30-second non-verbal animated public service announcements promoted by UNICEF, which illustrates the United Nations Convention on the Rights of the Child. Mondo TV contributed with "Children Have the Right to Survive", based on the Article 6 of the Child Rights Convention.

At the turn of the 21st century, Mondo TV released its first feature film, The Legend of the Titanic, a 90-minute animation that was then followed by its sequel, In Search of the Titanic in 2004, and by many other feature films. Around this time, its catalogue of TV series was sold to Indian channel Sahara TV, to air on its Just Kids! programming block, dubbed into Hindi.

In 2001, Mondo TV, in association with MIM AG and in co-production with NDF and Caligari Film, launched a 26-episode series, Letters from Felix, based on the Children's books by Annette Langen and Costanza Droop. It was followed by two 81-minute each featured films: Felix: All Around the World, released in 2005, and Felix: The Toy Rabbit and the Time Machine, released in 2006. In 2004, Mondo TV in co-production with RAI launched The Last of the Mohicans, a 26-episode animated series based on the historical novel by James Fenimore Cooper.

The same year, Mondo TV released three feature films: Turandot, released in association with Hahn Shin Corporation, based on the 1926 opera in three acts by Giacomo Puccini, Mother Theresa, based on and inspired by the life of Mother Teresa, and Genghis Khan, based on Genghis Khan, the founder and Great Khan (emperor) of the Mongol Empire.

Mondo TV, to strengthen its commitment to children's education, has produced a series of feature films of particular significance. Among these there are Padre Pio, co-produced with North Korean SEK Studio, depicting the life of Pio of Pietrelcina (1887–1968), an Italian Capuchin priest who was venerated as a saint by the Catholic Church; Saint Catherine, depicting the life of Saint Catherine of Siena (1347–1380), a tertiary of the Dominican Order, and a scholastic philosopher and theologian, co-produced by Orlando Corradi, the Rome's LUMSA University and its students attending the "Cartoons: Animation and Managagement" master's degree; and Alexander the Great, co-produced with DIFARM and based on Alexander the Great, the king of Macedonia. They were all released in 2006.

These feature films were followed by Karol, a 3-D animated feature film with music composed by Luis Bacalov that depicts the life of Pope John Paul II (1920–2005), Welcome Back Pinocchio, an animated feature film based on the fictional character that first appeared in print in 1883, in The Adventures of Pinocchio by Carlo Collodi, which were both released in 2007, and Saint Anthony, a 90-minute 3-D theatrical feature film released in 2008 and co-produced with DIFARM, based on the life of Anthony of Padua (1195–1231), the Portuguese Catholic priest and friar of the Franciscan Order. The Journey of J.M. Escrivá, an animated feature film that deals with the life of Josemaría Escrivá, the founder of Opus Dei, was released on the following year.

Gawayn, first aired on Rai 2 in 2008, is a French and Italian animated television series co-produced with Alphanim. The series has been translated into several languages, and its title refers to King Arthur's nephew.

In 2008, Mondo TV also presented its new cartoons at MIPTV Media Market:

- Monsters & Pirates – An 11-minute episode animated series co-produced with MPG, an associate of the confectionery giant Ferrero. It tells the story of two different pirate crews hunting for the same treasure. DVDs of the first two episodes of the cartoon were found inside packets of Ferrero snacks, along with figurines of characters from the series, which were also available inside Kinder Eggs.
- Kim – A twenty-six-episode series co-produced with Rai Fiction based on the picaresque novel Kim by Rudyard Kipling. This was the first time that this story was adapted into an animated series.
- Angel's Friends – A 52-episode comedy-adventure animated series co-produced by Mondo Home Entertainment, Play Entertainment, and Mediaset, based on the comic strip created by Simona Ferri. This series was launched at Mipcom in 2004, together with Sandokan III: The Two Tigers, the third season of the successful series about Salgari's hero co-produced with Rai Fiction.
- Puppy in My Pocket: Adventures in Pocketville – A co-production with Giochi Preziosi and MEG Toys, based on the successful toy line of the same name.
- Virus Attack – A cartoon created to raise awareness of pollution-related problems. The series consists of 52 episodes and first aired on 1 April 2011 on Cartoon Network Italy.

Two titles that Mondo TV launched at Mipcom 2011 were Power Buggz, a 30-minute children's comedy directed by Orlando Corradi and co-produced with MEG Toys and Playtime Buddies with music by John Sposito, a 52-episode preschool series that encourages the development of positive social interaction and cognitive skills. According to MEG Toys, this is unlike any other product on the preschool market and was released in North America in 2012 and even earlier in other parts of the world. It was co-produced with Visual Picnic, which holds the rights to the property created by Erik DePrince, and Licensing Works. Both series were filmed in full HD.

After the death of Orlando Corradi in November 2018, the stock shares passed to Monica Corradi and Matteo Corradi, who already was the President and C.E.O. of the company.

Mondo TV announced the imminent arrival on a number of new channels of its innovative animated action-comedy Invention Story co-produced with Genius Brands International. It has also announced that Spanish broadcaster RTVE will participate in Annie & Carola, co-produced with MB Producciones, and that German broadcaster Super RTL has joined as commissioning broadcaster on the new animated series Agent 203 co-produced with Toon2Tango.

== Library ==
Mondo TV possesses one of the largest animation libraries in Europe with more than 1,600 episodes of television series and more than 75 feature-length animated films for movie theatre and home video that it owns outright for all the world, and over 5,500 episodes in distribution of famous Japanese cartoons.

=== TV series ===
Title	Years	Network	Notes
The Jungle Book	1989–1990	TV Tokyo (Japan)	Based on the stories by Rudyard Kipling co-production with Nippon Animation and Doro TV Merchandising
Robin Hood	1990– 1992	NHK BS2 (Japan) Canale 5 (Italy)	Adapted from the English folktale Robin Hood Co-production with Tatsunoko Production
The Legend of Snow White	1994–1994	NHK BS2 (Japan) Italia 1 (Italy)	Adaptation of the German fairy tale by the Brothers Grimm Co-production with Tatsunoko Production
Sandokan	1998–2006	Rai 1	co-production with SEK Studio and Rai Fiction
The Great Book of Nature	1999–2000	Rai 2	co-production with SEK Studio
The Spaghetti Family	2003–2004	Rai 3	worldwide distribution co-production with The Animation Band and Rai Fiction
Angel's Friends	2009–2010	Italia 1	
Bondi Band	2010–2012	Disney XD (Worldwide)	co-production with Exim Licensing Group and LedaFilms
Puppy in My Pocket: Adventures in Pocketville	2010–2011	Italia 1 Cartoon Network (Worldwide)	co-production with Giochi Preziosi and MEG
Virus Attack	2011	Italia 1	
Gormiti Nature Unleashed	2012	Italia 1 Cartoon Network (worldwide)	co-production with Giochi Preziosi
Dinofroz	2012–2015	K2	co-production with Giochi Preziosi
Playtime Buddies	2013		
Robot Trains	2015–2021	DeA Junior/Cartoonito Italy; SBS (South Korea)	co-production with CJ ENM
Bat Pat	2015–2021	Rai Gulp; Clan (Spain)	co-production with Imira Entertainment and Atlantyca Entertainment
Eddie is A Yeti	2016		under Mondo TV Suisse co-production with Toon Goggles
Treasure Island	2016	Rai Gulp	co-production with Rai Fiction
Heidi, bienvenida a casa	2017–2019	Nickelodeon Latin America	First live-action production co-production with Alianzas Producciones
YooHoo to the Rescue	2019–2020	Netflix	co-production with Aurora World
Invention Story	2020	Frisbee; Mango TV (China)	co-production with Henan York Animation
MeteoHeroes	2020–2023	Cartoonito Italy	co-production with MOPI
Nina & Olga	2021	Rai Yoyo	co-production with Enanimation and Rai Ragazzi
Disco Dragon	2021	France 4 (France)	under Mondo TV France
Monster Loving Maniacs	2023–present	Nickelodeon Italy; Super RTL (Germany); DR (Denmark); SVT (Sweden); NRK (Norway); Ketnet (Belgium)	co-production with Toon2Tango, Belvision, Ja Film and Ginger Pictures
Grisù	2023–present	Rai YoYo & Rai Play; Kika (Germany)	co-production with Mondo TV France, Toon2Tango and ZDF Studios
Agent 203	2024–present	Rai Gulp; Super RTL (Germany)	co-production with Toon2Tango, V House Animation and Cosmos Maya

=== Feature films ===
Year	Title
1999	The Legend of the Titanic Additional information: 90-minute animated feature film.; Written and directed by Orlando Corradi; Screenplay by Clelia Castaldo and Loris Peota; Music by John Sposito; Co-produced with SEK Studio; Web page link
2000	The Prince of Dinosaurs Additional information: 90-minute animated feature film.; Written and directed by Orlando Corradi; Screenplay by Clelia Castaldo and Loris Peota; Music by John Sposito; Web page link
2000	Jesus: A Kingdom Without Frontiers Additional information: 90 min animated feature film depicting the life of Jesus of Nazareth (7–2 BC/BCE to 30–36 AD/CE).; Screenplay by Luciano Scaffa; Character design by Marco & Gi Pagot; "Maranatha" by Paolo and Cristina Zavalloni; Co-produced with Institute of Antoniano; Web page link
2004	In Search of the Titanic Additional information: 90-minute animated feature film and sequel of The Legend of Titanic.; Directed by Orlando Corradi; Screenplay by Loris Peota; Music by John Sposito; Web page link
2004	Turandot Additional information: 90-minute animated feature film based on the 1926 opera in three acts by Giacomo Puccini.; Screenplay by Gurerrino Gentilini and Luciano Scaffa; Designs by Marco and Gi Pagot; Music by Natale Massara; Co-produced with Hahn Shin Corporation; Web page link
2004	Mother Theresa Additional information: 90-minute animated feature film based on and inspired by the life of Mother Teresa.; Written and directed by Orlando Corradi; Screenplay by Clelia Castaldo and Loris Peota; Music by John Sposito; Web page link
2004	Genghis Khan Additional information: 90-minute animated feature film based on Genghis Khan, the founder and Great Khan (emperor) of the Mongol Empire.; Directed by Orlando Corradi; Screenplay by Luciano Scaffa; Designs by Marco and Gi Pagot; Music by Gian Carlo Chiaramello; Web page link
2005	Felix: All Around the World Additional information: 81-minute theatrical feature film based on the children's books by Annette Langen and Constanza Droop.; Directed by Giuseppe Laganà; Screenplay by John Paisley, Mark Slater and Marlowe Weisman; Music by Danny Chang; Co-production of Mondo Iel Media AG, NDF and Caligari Film; Web page link
2006	Padre Pio Additional information: 90-minute animated feature film depicting the life of Pio of Pietrelcina (1887–1968), an Italian Capuchin priest who is venerated as a saint by the Catholic Church.; Directed by Orlando Corradi and Jang Chol Su; Screenplay by Luciano Scaffa; Designs by Marco and Gi Pagot; Music by Paolo Zavallone; Co-produced with SEK Studio; Web page link
2006	Saint Catherine Additional information: 60-minute animated feature film depicting the life of Saint Catherine of Siena (1347–1380), a tertiary of the Dominican Order, and a Scholastic philosopher and theologian. The film was co-produced by Orlando Corradi, the Rome's LUMSA University and its students attending the "Cartoons: Animation and Managagement" master's, Concpetion Paula Marchesi, Serena Berlardetti, Alfieri Lorenzo Cimador, Pasquale Curatola, Fabio Di Blasi, Giorgio Luppina, Costanza Nutrini, Nicola Pecora, Simone Periccioli, and Eleonora Santini, under the aegis of Orlando Corradi.; Web page link
2006	Felix: The Toy Rabbit and the Time Machine Additional information: 81-minute theatrical feature film based on the children's books by Annette Langen and Constanza Droop.; Directed by Giuseppe Laganà; Screenplay by John Paisley, Mark Slater and Marlowe Weisman; Music by Danny Chang; Co-production of Mondo Iel Media AG, NDF and Caligari Film; Web page link
2006	Alexander the Great Additional information: 90-minute animated feature based on Alexander the Great, the king of Macedonia.; Directed by Orlando Corradi and Daehong Kim; Screenplay by Clelia Castaldo, Loris Peota, Luciano Scaffa, and Johnny Hartmann; Music by John Sposito and Luigi Pellegrino; Co-produced with DIFARM; Regions and languages: Europe, North and South America, Africa and Australia; in English, French, German, Italian, and Spanish; Web page link
2007	Karol Additional information: 90-minute 3-D animated feature film depicting the life of Pope John Paul II (1920–2005).; Directed by Orlando Corradi; Screenplay by Francesco Arlanch; Music by Luis Bacalov; Web page link
2007	Christmas in New York Additional information: 90-minute Theatrical feature film.; Directed by Orlando Corradi; Screenplay by Clelia Castaldo and Loris Peota; Music by John Sposito; Web page link
2007	Welcome Back Pinocchio Additional information: 90-minute animated feature film based on the fictional character that first appeared in 1883, in The Adventures of Pinocchio by Carlo Collodi.; Written and directed by Orlando Corradi; Screenplay by Clelia Castaldo and Loris Peota; Music by Argante and O. Petrossi; Web page link
2007	Ramses Additional information: 90-minute animated feature film.; Directed by Orlando Corradi; Screenplay by Luciano Scaffa; Designs by Marco and Gi Pagot; Music by L. Montagna; Web page link
2008	Barberbieni Additional information: 55-minute animated feature film.; Web page link
2008	Saint Anthony Additional information: 90-minute 3-D theatrical feature film based on the life of Anthony of Padua (1195–1231), the Portuguese Catholic priest and friar of the Franciscan Order.; Directed by Daehong Kim; Screenplay by Luciano Scaffa and Johnny Hartmann; Music by Paolo Zavallone; Co-produced with DIFARM; Languages English, French, Italian, Spanish; Web page link
2008	The Enchanted Mountain Additional information: 90-minute animated feature film.; Directed by Jim Jun Ok; Screenplay by Ju Song Il; Co-produced with SEK Studio; Web page link
2009	The Journey of J.M. Escrivá Additional information: 60-minute animated feature film that deals with the life of, Josemaría Escrivá, the founder of Opus Dei.; Directed by Orlando Corradi; Screenplay by Francesco Arlanch with consultation from The Prelature of the Holy Cross and Opus Dei; Languages Spanish, English, French, Italian; Web page link
2009	Prince Moon and Princess Sun Additional information: Directed by Kim Jun Ok; Animation by SEK Studio; Co-produced with SEK Studio; Web page link
2011	The Queen of the Swallows Additional information: 90-minute animated feature film.; Directed by Jim Jun Ok; Screenplay by Ju Song Il; Co-produced with SEK Studio; Web page link

=== Special releases ===
Year	Title
1997	Pocahontas Additional information: 26-episode × 26-minute extracted from the 39-episode series Super Little Fanta Heroes.; Written and directed by Orlando Corradi; Screenplays by Clelia Castaldo and Loris Peota; Music by John Sposito; Web pagelink
1997	Hua Mulan Additional information: 4-episode story extracted from the 39-episode series Super Little Fanta Heroes, telling the legend of the Chinese heroine Hua Mulan.; Music by John Sposito; Web page link
1997	Quasimodo: The Hunchback of Notre Dame Additional information: 3-episode story extracted from the 39-episode series Super Little Fanta Heroes, based on Quasimodo, the fictional character in the novel The Hunchback of Notre-Dame (1831) by Victor Hugo.; Screenplay by Clelia Castaldo and Loris Peota; Music by John Sposito; Web page link
1997	Hercules Additional information: 4-episode story extracted from the 39-episode series Super Little Fanta Heroes, based on the Greek demigod Heracles.; Music by John Sposito; 4 Episode story: "Hercules" Production by Mondo TV – Music Publisher DORO TV – Broadcast in more than 16 countries. – Composed, arranged and performed. (all instruments); Web page link
1997	King David Additional information: 3-episode story extracted from the 39-episode series Super Little Fanta Heroes, based on David, the second king of the united Kingdom of Israel.; Music by John Sposito; Web page link
1997	Ulysses Additional information: Extracted from the 39-episode series Super Little Fanta Heroes, based on Odysseus, the main character of the epic poems Odyssey, and extracted from the 39-episode series Super Little Fanta Heroes (1997).; Format: DVD; Web page link
1997	The Thief of Baghdad Additional information: Extracted from the 39-episode series Super Little Fanta Heroes.; Web page link
1998	The King of Kings: Jesus Additional information: Extracted from the 26-episode series Jesus: A Kingdom Without Frontiers.

== See also ==
- The Black Corsair
- The Last of the Mohicans#TV
- Lupo Alberto
- Sandokan#TV miniseries
- SEK Studio
- List of science fiction television programs, V
- List of science fiction television programs by genre
