= Dinofroz =

- Genre: science fantasy superhero fiction
- Created by: Orlando Corradi
- Voices of: Fabi di Ranno; Valeria Gasi; Ricardo Mazza
- Country of origin: Italy
- Original language: Italian
- No. of seasons: 2
- No. of episodes: 52

Production
- Producer: Giochi Preziosi
- Running time: 26 minutes (per episode)
- Production company: Mondo TV

Original release
- Network: K2
- Release: September 10, 2012 – December 1, 2015

Dinofroz is an Italian animated series made by Giochi Preziosi in partnership with the Italian studio Mondo TV.

== Synopsis ==
The series depicts the adventures of Tom Carter, a 12-year-old boy and his friends who, after playing a board game, are teleported to the past where they can transform themselves into dinosaurs using stones called the Rockfroz. It was foretold in legends that the Dinofroz would come to save people, dinosaurs and the world from merciless rule of the dragons they have the power of the Rockfroz and become heroes. The Shaman is a magician with immense magical powers who is a major help to the Dinofroz in their journey to destroy Lord of Dragons Niceron in retaining the Rockfroz. The Rockfroz is a unique rock fragment giving the Dinofroz special powers in fighting the cruel generals of Niceron and their subordinate dragons. Another important help for the Dinofroz is a mammoth named Nelsten whose family was killed by Niceron in an arm-to-arm combat. Tom's father Professor James Carter is another important person who travels ahead of the four friends in time in order to save Tom from the Dragon Lord's cruel wrath.

== Characters ==
=== Main ===
- Tom Carter, the group's leader: Tom is charismatic and secure. His father is a famous paleontologist, who disappeared during a research expedition. Tom, curious to find out what happened to his father, looks in his father's lab and finds an odd board game. With the board game, he and his friends can teleport to the past and transform into dinosaurs. He finds out that he and his friends have to save the world from Niceron, the Lord of the Dragons and his allies. Tom transforms into a Tyrannosaurus rex, and in the last episode, successfully defeats Niceron, and saves the futures of the dinosaurs and the human race. In season 2, Tom obtains the Dinowatch, a wrist device that allows him to transform into metallic animals: Tyrannosaurus rex, Smilodon, a Gigantopithecus, a gorilla, and a Velociraptor. Later on when they can extract DNA from the other dinosaurs, Tom gets two new forms; Triceratops and Ankylosaurus.
- Bob: Transforms into a Triceratops. He is really loyal to Tom and likes eating. He is very strong and good at combat skills.
- John: Transforms into a Smilodon. He is independent and a good fighter. He works as a circus stunt performer and is very fast on legs. John is a very important part of dinofroz helping the dinofroz immeasurably by showcasing his natural human borne talents to retain the rockfroz.
- Eric: Transforms into a Pterosaur. He is a master of technology. He is loyal to Tom, but not very self-confident.

=== Recurring ===
- Niceron: Niceron is the lord of the dragons. He is merciless and will do anything in order to defeat the Dinofroz. He only cares about himself, the enslavement of humans and torturing non dragon animals. Niceron is killed in the first-season finale by Tom.
- General Vlad: Vlad is one of Niceron's generals. He is able to transform others into vampiric dragons through his bite. Vlad reappears in the second season as Treek/Drakemon's general. Vlad realizes that Drakemon is becoming insane and eventually helps the Dinofroz to save the world.
- General Gladius: Gladius is one of Niceron's generals and has fire-based powers. He appears to be the youngest and is not very wise. He blindly obeys his lord, and even after Niceron steals his powers, he refuses to accept that his lord is wrong.
- General Kobrax: Kobrax is one of Niceron's generals. He seems to be older than Gladius, but a lot younger than Vlad. He is very intelligent, but he uses his cleverness for evil purposes. He is very sly and he is very jealous of Vlad. He never acts thoughtlessly, and he is always word-fighting with Vlad. Kobrax can spit a paralyzing venom, a deadly venom and fire. He can also tangle the foes with vines and squeeze them.
- General Treek/Drakemon: Treek is Niceron's former general. He is the only dragon who knows that the dragons are going to be extinct if Niceron continues to rule, but he is considered a traitor and was imprisoned. Treek returns in the second season, where he renames himself Drakemon. As Drakemon, his goal to save the dragon species from extinction.
- General Artik: Arctk is one of Treek/Drakemon's generals. He is a white-bearded Asian dragon who uses his wings as blades. Artik is a calm and intellect but aggressive strategist. He has a kindred friendship with Petraeus since both were recruited as generals at the same time. He, along with Petraeus, questions Drakemon of his plans and secrets, which Drakemon hides from them. Artik is accused of being a spy and a traitor to Drakemon and replaced with Natterjack.
- General Petraeus: Petraeus is one of Treek/Drakemon's generals. He is a short red dragon with a hammer on his tail and shield-like wings. Petraeus seem to be rough and slightly aggressive when things are getting off track with suspicion of a traitorous spy. Petraeus has a kindred friendship with General Artik since both were recruited as generals at the same time.

=== Minor characters ===
- Professor James Carter: Tom's father and a world-famous paleontologist. James went missing discovering artifacts about Jurassic area. He was actually captured as a prisoner of Niceron.
- The Shaman: A wizard who aids the Dinofroz in finding pieces of Rockfroz.
- Melston: A woolly mammoth and friend of the Dinofroz and Kaira. He was granted magical powers by the shaman to get revenge on Niceron, who killed his family.
- Kaira: A young village girl who is the love interest of Tom. She is the only girl in the series to know about the Dinofroz.
- Professor Ted Warnell: An old friend of James Carter, who double-crossed him by working for the Double Delta Division (DDD). He is interested in the content of James's watch.
- Sveva: A girl who goes to the same school as the Dinofroz. She is the love interest of John.
- Alisa: A friend of Sveva and Ya - Ya. She is the love interest of Bob.
- Ya - Ya: A friend of Sveva and Alice.
- Professor Paul Stroker: Will's father, who made his son a hybrid Dragon Man and plans to rule the world.
- Will Stroker: Professor Stroker's son, who is made a hybrid Dragon Man by his father.
- Nancy Warnell: Dr. Warnell's daughter, a military officer.
- Burt: Professor Stroker's assistant, who helps Stroker in his plan to rule the world.
- Helen: Professor Stroker's assistant, who is unaware of Stroker's plan to rule the world.
- Dr. Hoda: A scientist working for Double Delta Division, who is unaware of Stroker's plan to rule the world.
- Genno: A cave boy who has a scar on his face and lives in the same village with Keira. He has a crush on Keira and was Jealous of Tom because Keira loves Tom. He left his village to join Stroker and willingly become a Man Dragon Hybrid.
- Tusk: A Pegomastax who is Bob's pet.

=== Dragon Tribes ===
- Warrior Dragons: Also called the Guard Dragons, the Warrior Dragons are green dragons with two tails, two wings, and saw-like spikes on their back.
- Vampire Dragons: The Vampire Dragons are blue dragons with large fangs and spikes on their back. Vampire Dragons possess shapeshifting abilities and can convert others into vampire-like forms via their bite.
- Gladiator Dragons: Also called Dragon Warriors, the Gladiator Dragons are red dragons commanded by Gladius. Via their wings, Gladiator Dragons are able to project electrical projectiles and flaming nets, also called a "Golden Net", or "Glowing Net".
- Serpent Dragons: Also called the Dragon Snakes, the Serpent Dragons are green and purple dragons commanded by Kobrax. They have large fangs and a snake tongue. Serpent Dragons can spit a paralyzing poison and have long tails that they can use to constrict others.
- Treek's Tribe: A group of dragons commanded by Treek.

=== Dragon Mutants ===
The Dragon Mutants are independent from the Dragon Tribes and have unique powers and appearances from bathing in the Fires of Galgoth, sacred lava that makes dragons more powerful.

- Spider Yarn: A spider-like dragon who can shoot webs from his mouth.
- Spectro: A slender ghost-like dragon who can ram at high speeds.
- Hammerhead: A two-headed truck-like dragon who can use their wings as a spiked shield.
- Silver Flash: A silver dragon who can move at high speeds. He has giant yellow Stegosaurus-like plates on his back. He returns in Episode 14.
- Poison Wing: A colorful poisonous mushroom dragon.
- Dragon Fire: A dragon made out of fire whose essence is contained in armor.
- Thunder Dragon: An electric-type dragon that can create storms. He can shoot both fire and lightning, usually from his wings.
- Dragon Blade: A metallic mantis-like dragon with scythe-like limbs and wings.
- Natterjack: A dragon frog who can spit poisonous slim. After Artik is ousted from Drakemon's forces, Drakemon makes Natterjack a general, taking Artik's place.
- Nest Dragon (Legion in English): A feathered buffalo-like dragon with six small parrot-like dragons that roost on the dragon's tusk or horns. They have a hive mind connection with each other.
- Turtle Dragon: A turtle-like dragon with retractable beetle wings.
- Fighter Dragons: Warrior dragon soldiers that resemble Vendetta Dragons but now colored red like Gladiator Dragons.

== Voice cast ==
=== Italian ===
- Fabi di Ranno
- Valeria Gasi
- Ricardo Mazza

=== English ===
- Rory Max Kaplan
- David Errigo
- Billy Bob Thompson
- Mike Pollock
- Marc Thompson
- Graham Halstead
- Alyson Leigh Rosenfeld
- David Wills
- Jake Paque
- Allen Enlow

== Episodes ==
=== Season 1 (2012) ===
No. overall	No. in series	Title	Original release date
1	1	"The Origin"	September 10, 2012
2	2	"The Shaman"	September 10, 2012
3	3	"The Rockfroz"	September 11, 2012
4	4	"A New Enemy"	September 12, 2012
5	5	"Surprise Attack"	September 13, 2012
6	6	"In the Land of Crushing Liana"	September 17, 2012
7	7	"Neceron the Merciless"	September 18, 2012
8	8	"The Temple of Doom"	September 19, 2012
9	9	"The Predestined"	September 20, 2012
10	10	"Unexpected Help"	September 21, 2012
11	11	"Mortal Danger"	September 25, 2012
12	12	"The Island of the Moon"	September 26, 2012
13	13	"Hunt for General Treek"	September 27, 2012
14	14	"The Revolt of the Dragons"	September 28, 2012
15	15	"Double Deception"	September 29, 2012
16	16	"Message from the Past"	November 14, 2012
17	17	"An Adventure for Six"	November 15, 2012
18	18	"The Secret of James"	November 15, 2012
19	19	"The Guardian of the Lake"	November 16, 2012
20	20	"Return from the Dark"	November 16, 2012
21	21	"The Shadow of the Enemy"	December 10, 2012
22	22	"Mission: White Dragon"	December 11, 2012
23	23	"Desperate Escape"	December 12, 2012
24	24	"The Last Eclipse"	December 13, 2012
25	25	"Bare Faced"	December 17, 2012
26	26	"The End of the Beginning"	December 18, 2012

=== Season 2: Dragon's Revenge (2015) ===
No. overall	No. in series	Title	Original release date
27	1	"The Return to the Past World"	September 14, 2015
28	2	"The Iron Dinosaur"	September 15, 2015
29	3	"An Island in the Sky"	September 16, 2015
30	4	"A New Dinofroz"	September 17, 2015
31	5	"The Legend of Firerock"	September 21, 2015
32	6	"The Dragon from the Swamp"	September 22, 2015
33	7	"Mistery at the Center of the Earth"	September 23, 2015
34	8	"The Dragon Slayers"	September 24, 2015
35	9	"Race Against Time"	September 28, 2015
36	10	"The Girl with the Jade Eyes"	September 29, 2015
37	11	"Codename: Dominion Project"	September 30, 2015
38	12	"The Fury of Drakemon"	October 1, 2015
39	13	"The Power of the Dinowatch"	October 5, 2015
40	14	"The Day of the Two Stars"	October 6, 2015
41	15	"The Shadow of Betrayal"	October 7, 2015
42	16	"Acquisition: Triceratops"	October 8, 2015
43	17	"In the Lair of the Enemy"	October 12, 2015
44	18	"Face to Face"	October 13, 2015
45	19	"A New Alliance"	October 14, 2015
46	20	"Mission Incredible"	October 15, 2015
47	21	"Tower Assault"	November 23, 2015
48	22	"The Ice Prison"	November 24, 2015
49	23	"Unexpected Proposal"	November 25, 2015
50	24	"From Father to Son"	November 26, 2015
51	25	"Over the Skies of Rocketown"	November 30, 2015
52	26	"The Last Secret"	December 1, 2015

== International broadcasting ==
- India - Discovery Kids
- India - ETV Bal bharat: May 5, 2021
- Mexico - a+: March 25, 2017
- Southeast Asia - Cartoon Network
- UK - Disney XD: April 7, 2017
- Canada - Teletoon/Télétoon: 2016
- France - Gulli: 2013
- Philippines - GMA Network: 2021
- United States - Disney XD: 2021
- Serbia - Ultra: 2013
- Montenegro - Ultra: 2013
