= Orlando Corradi =

Italian film director, animator and film distributor (1940-2018)

- Born: 18 February 1940; Busto Arsizio
- Died: 7 November 2018 (aged 78); Switzerland
- Occupations: Film director, animator, film distributor
- Title: Co-Founder, President, CEO & CFO of Mondo TV

Orlando Corradi (18 February 1940 Busto Arsizio – 7 November 2018, Switzerland) was an Italian film director, animator, and film distributor. He was the co-founder, president, CEO and CFO of Mondo TV.

== Career ==
Born in Busto Arsizio on 18 February, 1940. Corradi (along with Kenichi Tominaga) founded DEA S.n.c. in 1964, a company active in the audiovisual animation sector, with the aim of acquiring the rights to Japanese animated cartoons for distribution in Italy and Europe. In 1979 and 1980, respectively, Corradi and Tominaga created the companies DORO TV Merchandising. for large-scale television networks, and Italian TV Broadcasting S.r.l., for smaller-size broadcaster. The period from the late 1970s to the early 1980s saw the rise in demand for Japanese animated cartoons and the growth of the Italian television market. The two companies started distributing feature films, TV series and sports events. Mondo TV S.r.l. was founded in 1985 to produce animated cartoon series. Corradi died in Switzerland (where he lived since 2012) on 7 November 2018.

== Personal life ==
He was married to Giuliana Bertozzi. He had two sons, Ricky Corradi and Mateo Corradi, and a daughter, Monica Corradi. Following his death, Matteo Corradi is now the CEO.

== Filmography ==
=== Films (as director) ===
- King David (1997)
- Hua Mulan (1997)
- The Legend of the Titanic (1999)
- The Prince of Dinosaurs (2000)
- In Search of the Titanic (2004)
- Mother Teresa (2004)
- Genghis Khan (2004)
- Padre Pio (2006, with Jang Chol Su)
- Saint Catherine (2006)
- Alexander the Great (2006)
- Karol (2007)
- Christmas in New York (2007)
- Welcome Back Pinocchio (2007)
- Ramses (2007)
- The Journey of J.M. Escrivá (2009)
- Virus Attack (2011)
- Gormiti Nature Unleashed (2012)
- Angel's Friends (2009)
- Angel's Friends: Between Dream and Reality (2011)

=== Television Series (as producer) ===
- Christopher Columbus (1990)
- The Story of Cinderella (1996)
- The Legend of Zorro (1996)
- Simba the King Lion (1996)
- Pocahontas (1996)
- Super Little Fanta Heroes (1997)
- Sandokan (1997-2006)
- Hercules (1998; Orlando wrote also)
- The Black Corsair (1998-1999)
- Toy Toons (1999-2000)
- Bugs' Adventures (1999-2000)
- Simba Jr. Goes to N.Y. and the World Cup (1998)
- Letters from Felix (2003)
- The Last of the Mohicans (2004)
- Farhat: The Prince of the Desert (2004)
- Gladiators (2009)
- Dinofroz (2012)
