= Cicciobello =

- First appearance: 1962
- Created by: Gervasio Chiari

In-universe information
- Nickname: Cicciobello

Cicciobello is an Italian range of dolls produced by Sebino Bambole, and released through Giochi Preziosi.

Created in 1962 by Gervasio Chiari (founder of the Sebino doll factory), Cicciobello has been established as a symbol for generations of Italian children, so much to be subsequently produced in numerous variations. The doll still enjoys fame and popularity.

== About ==
Cicciobello resembles a male few-month-old baby, thus enabling children to learn through play to become familiar with the job of parenting. The doll drinks from his bunny-shaped feeding bottle, sucks his pacifier and cries when it is taken out.

== Variants ==
- Standard - The standard version of the doll that comes in all sorts of outfits and varieties, including a Polar Bear onesie and a Winnie the Pooh hoodie. The doll will cry if its pacifier is taken out and will stop crying when it is inserted back in.
- Brushing Teeth - When its back is pressed, Cicciobello will brush its teeth.
- Good Night - A standard Cicciobello doll with soft pyjamas and glowing stickers.
- Love 'n' Care - Known as "Cicciobello Bua" in Italian, this doll can feel unwell and will cry, which the owner will need to find out what is wrong with him. Solutions include Magic Juice, Magic Milk and Magic Medicine, and if the doll still cries, it needs to be given an injection or an ear checkup, to which the doll will feel better again.
- Magico Orsetto - This version of the doll includes a Winnie the Pooh toy that can interact with the doll using a magnet system. If the doll cries when its pacifier is taken out or doesn't want to go to sleep, the Winnie the Pooh toy can let it fall asleep in no time.
- Raccontastorie - A version of Cicciobello that can talk and tell bedtime stories to its owner. It can also provide voice recordings, ask for its pacifier or milk, project star lights in the ceiling, and sing lullabies.
- Real Tears - Known as "Cicciobello Lacrime Vere" in Italian, this version contains a water tank inside its head which can allow the doll to drink and cry real tears if it is neglected or needs its owner to ask it something. Cicciobello also comes with a guide about its "crying talk" and a set of tissues to wipe his tears away.
- Sunny - This version of Cicciobello can gain a tan when placed in direct sunlight. It does not operate using batteries.
- Sweet Lunch - A version of Cicciobello that includes a plate and spoon. When its back is pressed, he will move his arm.
- Angelo Negro - A version of Cicciobello that is of African descent.
- Bimbo Giallo - A version of Cicciobello that is of Asian descent.

== Other Countries ==
Cicciobello has also been released outside Italy. In Latin America, it was sold through the Kreisel distributor (Venezuela), and in Chile for IMEXPORTA. Several versions have been released by Giochi Preziosi's British and Spanish subsidiary, Flair Leisure Products.
