= The Great Book of Nature =

Italian-North Korean animated children's television series

- Genre: Adventure; Drama; Fantasy; Anthology; Educational; Children's television series
- Created by: Orlando Corradi
- Music by: John Sposito
- Countries of origin: Italy; North Korea
- Original languages: English; Italian
- No. of episodes: 54

Production
- Producer: Orlando Corradi
- Running time: 26 minutes
- Production company: Mondo TV

Original release
- Network: Rai 2
- Release: June 7, 1999 – August 25, 2000

The Great Book of Nature (Italian: Il Grande Libro della Natura) is an animated children's television series produced by Mondo TV and SEK Studio in 1999. It is composed of non-sequential episodes hosted by a bear, this series features various kind of creatures, such as fish, insects and birds, while depicting their different habitats - whether sea, land or sky. At the end of each episode, the audience is treated to instructive sets of questions and answers that teach young viewers about a given creature's various kind of behaviours. There are 54 different episode of it of different stories. Before being compiled into a television series, the animated shorts were likely used as theatrical propaganda cartoons in North Korea.

This show was telecast in India in Just Kids! on Sahara TV, and in Arab world on Spacetoon, and in Poland on TVP3 to summer-autumn (July–October) 2000 and winter-spring (January–April) 2001 and also in Russia on TRC Petersburg (St-Petersburg, 3ch VHF1) to winter-spring (or February–March for Sure) 2004 and Moscow channel "Stolica" (VHF3) to winter (December–January) 2004-2005.

This show was shown in various countries in different languages after Mondo TV went public.

== Episodes ==
- The Hedgehog
- The Raccoon
- The Monkey
- The Bear
- The Rabbit
- The Wolf
- The Turtle
- The Red Fox
- The Grizzly Bear
- The Squirrel
- The Brown Bear
- The Rat
- The Wild Cat
- The Hare
- The Butterfly
- The Bee
- The Dragonfly
- The Red Ant
- The Hornet
- The Fly
- The Ladybird
- The Duck
- The Magpie
- The Swan
- The Woodpecker
- The Crow
- The Sparrow
- The Goldfinch
- The Robin
- The Stork
- The Frog
- The Sea Turtle
- The Goat
- The Pig
- The Rooster
- The Bull
- The Domestic Goat
- The Chicken
- The Horse
- The Cuttle Fish
- The Octopus
- The Crab
- The Fighting Fish
- The Golden Fish
- The Killer Whale
- The Dolphin
- The Dragon
- The Winged Horse
- The Cat
- The Dog
- The Bulldog
- The Greyhound
- The Poodle
- The Cocker Spaniel
