= Gormiti (2008 TV series) =

Italian-French TV series or program

- Also known as: Gormiti: The Lords of Nature Return! (season 1); Gormiti: The Supreme Eclipse Era! (season 2); Gormiti: The Neorganic Evolution (season 3)
- Genre: Action; Adventure; Fantasy; Comedy drama Superhero
- Created by: Leandro Consumi; Gianfranco Enrietto
- Directed by: Sylvain Girault; Pascal Jardin; Pascal Ropars
- Starring: Paolo De Santis; Massimo Di Benedetto; Federico Zanandrea; Patrizia Mottola; Marcella Silvestri; Graziano Galoforo; Emmanuel Garijo; Hervé Grull; Alexandre Nguyen; Delphine Braillon; Christophe Lemoine; Tony Marot; Sylvie Jacob
- Theme music composer: Damien Roques; Bastide Donny; Gil Escriva; Jose Perea; Gary Violet
- Opening theme: "Gormiti, che miti!"
- Composers: David Vadant; Noam Kaniel
- Countries of origin: France; Italy
- Original languages: French; Italian
- No. of seasons: 3
- No. of episodes: 65

Production
- Executive producers: Leandro Consumi; Guillaume Rostault (season 1); Charles Henri-Moarbes (seasons 2–3); Berthe Lotsova (season 2); Mélanie Van Hooren (season 3)
- Producers: Vincent Chalvon-Demersay; Enrico Preziosi; Dario Berte
- Running time: 22 minutes
- Production companies: Marathon Media; Giochi Preziosi; Mediaset

Original release
- Network: Italia 1 (Italy, 2008–2010); Boing (Italy, 2010); Canal J (France, 2008-2010)
- Release: 27 October 2008 – 11 August 2011

Related
- Gormiti Nature Unleashed; Gormiti (2018)

Gormiti (Italian: Gormiti, che miti or Gormiti - Il ritorno dei Signori della Natura) is an animated series co-produced by Giochi Preziosi Group and Marathon Media, based on the Italian Gormiti toy line. It consisted of three seasons with 65 episodes. The first season, titled Gormiti: The Lords of Nature Return!, premiered on 27 October 2008. The second season, Gormiti: The Supreme Eclipse Era! debuted on 29 October 2009, while the third season, Gormiti: The Neorganic Evolution, aired on 30 October 2010.

It was broadcast for the first time on Italia 1 and Canal J from 27 October 2008. It aired on 5 October 2009 on Cartoon Network in the United States, and on CITV and Nicktoons in the United Kingdom. The second season returned to the USA and Canada in Summer 2012.

The series had high ratings worldwide and received positive reviews. A new CGI series, titled Gormiti Nature Unleashed, began airing in Italy in 2012, followed by a third series in 2018.

== Plot ==
The show follows two brothers, Nick and Toby, who discover that they have the power to transform into powerful creatures known as Gormitis. Their two friends Jessica and Lucas join the fight, and together they harness the power of the four elements. Now it is up to them to save their world, and many others, from threats of destruction.

== Characters ==
Toby Tripp

Toby Tripp (voiced by Paolo De Santis in Italian, Sam Riegel in English, Emmanuel Garijo in French) is Nick's older brother and the Lord of Water. He would rather "go Gormiti" than stay as a Keeper in the Primal Pad. As the Lord of Water, Toby can control water and breathe underwater. In "Curse of the Crown", Toby is revealed to have arachnophobia, and in "Going Buggy", he is forced to face his fear head on to save his friends, allowing him in the end to conquer his fear of spiders.

Nick Tripp

Nick Tripp (voiced by Massimo Di Benedetto in Italian, Brian Beacock in English, Hervé Grull in French is Toby's younger brother. He serves as a foil to his brother, being intelligent, tidy, and willing to observe proper manners and protocols on Earth and in Gorm. As the Lord of the Earth, Nick is able to control rocks and stones.

Lucas Wanson

Lucas Wanson (voiced by Federico Zanandrea in Italian, Ogie Banks in English, Alexandre Nguyen in French) is an 11-year-old boy and lover of nature. As the Lord of the Forest, Lucas can control trees and plants. He is oblivious of Gina's feelings for him.

Jessica Herleins

Jessica Herleins (voiced by Patrizia Mottola and Marcella Silvestri in Italian, Melissa Fahn in episodes 1-26 of the English dub, Kate Higgins in episodes 27-65 of the English dub, Laura Bailey in episode 53 of the English dub, Delphine Braillon in French) is the Lord of Air and Gina's best friend. Although often engaged in fashion-related occurrences, she is always there for her friends and above all else when there are problems, does not hesitate to risk her life to save them.

Razzle

Razzle (voiced by Graziano Galoforo in Italian, Brian Beacock in English, Christophe Lemoine in French) is an intelligent dinosaur who was entrusted by the Old Sage with the task of finding the Lords of Nature. He lives in the Primal Pad, and acts as the kids' guide and a link between Earth and Gorm.

Paula Pickney

Paula Pickney (voiced by Colleen O'Shaughnessey in English, Laura Préjean in French) is a girl who attempts to catch the Lords, believing them to be aliens. In the episode "Slip Rift", a giant whirlwind carries Paula to Gorm, where she learns that Toby, Lucas, Nick, and Jessica are the Lords. She obtains photographic evidence of the Lords' existence, but the photos are deleted before she can share them.

Ike Pickney

Ike Pickney (voiced by Wally Wingert in English, Tony Marot in French) is a classmate of Nick and Archaeology Club Component. He is always cracking jokes in bad taste and hates Toby for unknown reasons and usually tends to be his bodyguard. Ike is the older brother of Paula.

Gina Louren

Gina Louren (voiced by Tara Platt in English, Sylvie Jacob in French) is the best friend of Jessica. Like Ike and Paula, she mostly appears in the first season. She is also obsessed with fashion, like Jessica, and is always there when needed. She is in love with Lucas and has no problems showing it and is also the football team's mascot for the soccer team Toby and Nick are on.

Magmion

Magmion is the leader of the volcano Gormiti and the main antagonist of the first season. He wishes to destroy the people of Gorm and become its ruler.

== Episodes ==
Series	Episodes	Originally released	
Series	Episodes	First released	Last released
1	26	27 October 2008	30 December 2009
2	26	31 October 2009	24 October 2010
3	13	30 October 2010	11 August 2011

=== Season 1: The Lords of Nature Return! (2008-09) ===
No.	Title	Original air date	English air date
1	The Sulfur Stone	27 October 2008	5 October 2009
2	Lucas Goes Green	29 October 2008	6 October 2009
3	The Keeper Kept	31 October 2008	7 October 2009
4	Tidal Wave Goodbye	3 November 2008	8 October 2009
5	Curse of the Crown	5 November 2008	9 October 2009
6	Beastly	7 November 2008	12 October 2009
7	Outsiders	10 November 2008	13 October 2009
8	Black Salt Diamonds	12 November 2008	14 October 2009
9	Underwater Extinction	14 November 2008	15 October 2009
10	Root of Evil	18 November 2008	16 October 2009
11	Shock to the System	20 November 2008	19 October 2009
12	Sick Day	25 November 2008	20 October 2009
13	Tunnel Vision	27 November 2008	21 October 2009
14	Toad House Blues	1 December 2008	22 October 2009
15	Lords of Fate	3 December 2008	23 October 2009
16	Sting of Insecticus	5 December 2008	26 October 2009
17	Super Gormiti	8 December 2008	27 October 2009
18	Crops of Wrath	10 December 2008	28 October 2009
19	The Fog	12 December 2008	29 October 2009
20	The Harvest	15 December 2008	30 October 2009
21	Manners	17 December 2008	2 November 2009
22	Labyrinth of Chaos	19 December 2008	3 November 2009
23	The Supreme of Darkness	22 December 2008	4 November 2009
24	Dazed	24 December 2008	5 November 2009
25 26	Slip Rift	26 December 2008 30 December 2008	6 November 2009 9 November 2009

=== Season 2: The Supreme Eclipse Era! (2009-10) ===
O	S	Episode	Original airdate
27	1	The Rot of Gorm	31 October 2009
28	2	Going Buggy	7 November 2009
29	3	The Crystal Curse	14 November 2009
30	4	The Forgotten Valley	21 November 2009
31	5	Refracting Rock	28 November 2009
32	6	Senseless	5 December 2009
33	7	The Ring of Eternity	12 December 2009
34	8	Diamonds are an Evil Lord's Best Friend	19 December 2009
35	9	Diverted	26 December 2009
36	10	Exchange of Powers	17 April 2010
37	11	Battle from Within	10 April 2010
38	12	Hibernation	16 October 2010
39	13	Solitary Egg	24 April 2010
40	14	Grounded	1 May 2010
41	15	Crushed	8 May 2010
42	16	Wingless	15 May 2010
43	17	Forest Asunder	22 May 2010
44	18	Flight of the Snow Eagle	29 May 2010
45	19	The Pearl of the Deep	5 June 2010
46	20	Tripping Up	12 June 2010
47	21	Power of the North	19 June 2010
48	22	Power of the South	26 September 2010
49	23	Power of the West	25 September 2010
50	24	Power of the East	17 October 2010
51 52	25 26	Eternal Eclipse	23 October 2010 24 October 2010

=== Season 3: The Neorganic Evolution (2010-11) ===
No.	Title	Original airdate
53	Rebith	30 October 2010
54	Dust in the Wind	31 October 2010
55	Forces of the Water	6 November 2010
56	Forest of Fire	7 November 2010
57	The Curse of the Winds	13 November 2010
58	Dark Water	14 November 2010
59	Lava Rocks	20 November 2010
60	Unseen Danger	21 November 2010
61	Underground Attack	11 August 2011
62	The Poisoned Forest	27 November 2010
63	Magor's Fog	11 August 2011
64	Metal Leaves	11 August 2011
65	The Passageway	11 August 2011

== Broadcast ==
The series premiered in Italy and France on 27 October 2008, airing on Italia 1 and Canal J, respectively. According to trade publication C21Media, the series attracted more than one million viewers per episode during its initial run on Mediaset.

In the United States it premiered on Cartoon Network in October 2009. Other broadcasters included RTL 2 in Germany, RTVE and Cartoon Network in Spain, and Nickelodeon in the United Kingdom. In Latin America, the series was broadcast on Disney XD beginning in January 2011. In Brazil, it premiered on TV Globinho on 3 January 2011.

== DVD ==
The first season was released on DVD by Clear Vision in March 2011, with the 2nd season being released on 18 February 2013.

== Video On-Demand ==
The first season of Gormiti is available for streaming via Toon Goggles On-Demand Entertainment for Kids.

All three seasons can also be located on HULU.

== Video game ==
A Gormiti video game for the Nintendo DS and the Wii was developed by Climax Studios and released by Konami in August 2010 on Europe and September of the same year on North America.
