= Giochi Preziosi =

Toy manufacturer

Giochi Preziosi S.p.A.
- Trade name: Gruppo Giochi Preziosi
- Type: privately-owned S.p.A.
- Industry: Toys, Entertainment
- Founded: 1978
- Founder: Enrico Preziosi
Headquarters
Milan, Italy (legal)	Cogliate, Italy (de facto)
Key people
Enrico Preziosi	(chairman)
- Revenue: €403 million (2018)
- Operating income: ▲€90 million (2018)
Owner
Fingiochi
Preziosi Investments
- Website: http://www.gruppopreziosi.it
- Footnotes in consolidated financial statement

Giochi Preziosi S.p.A. also known as Gruppo Giochi Preziosi (Giochi Preziosi Group) is an Italian company that produces toys and TV series based on their toys. They work in association with Marathon Media and Mondo TV.

Giochi Preziosi is the principal owner of the Gormiti and Dinofroz franchises and license toys for other companies such as Marvel Comics, Power Rangers, Ben 10 and Winx Club toys. In 2006, they started to produce TV series based on their toys. The first series was Gormiti: The Lords of Nature Returns!. They have also produced video games based on the Gormiti TV series for the Nintendo Wii and Nintendo DS.

== History ==
Enrico Preziosi founded Giochi Preziosi in 1978 at a garage in Baruccana, Brianza, initially selling toys to mobile salesmen in the Milan region. These salesmen would eventually form the basis of the company proper. Over time, the company signed exclusivity agreements to distribute toys from international companies such as Japanese toy makers Bandai and Tomy, and in 1984, it acquired the Ciciobello doll line from Sebino. In the mid-1980s, the company attacked Mattel and Hasbro's advertising tactics on Silvio Berlusconi's networks in the months leading up to Christmas (Rete 4, Canale 5, Italia 1) by advertising its toys year-round in a consistent manner; this reportedly cost the company three million lira. This strategy worked, and in 1988, Enrico Preziosi creates the Giocheria toy store chain, relaunched Cicciobello and, over time, created the Canta Tu karaoke machine, and, in 2005, the Gormiti IP.

Compared to Clementoni, Giochi Preziosi's modus operandi was more commercial in nature. The company developed its own products and developed its own brands, while also licensing other brands and distributing foreign toys. A substantial amount of its products were manufactured in Asia andmarketed through advertisers, wholesalers and stores.

Giochi Preziosi sold 50% stake of a joint venture Prenatal Retail Group to its partner Artsana in 2017. The same year, Enrico Preziosi, chairman of Giochi Preziosi, bought back the minority ownership of the company from Chinese company Ocean Gold Global. In 2011, Flair, one of the UK's top ten toy companies, was acquired, becoming part of the group. Ocean Gold Global invested in Giochi Preziosi in 2014.

The company faced two problems in 2020: lockdown restrictions caused logistical hurdles, while it ended its agreement with MGA Entertainment, without explaining why. In 2025, it was acquired by Chinese company Superhisen.

== Toys produced ==
- Winx Club
- Cicciobello
- Dinofroz
- Gormiti
- Huntik
- Puppy in My Pocket

== Television series ==
- Gormiti: The Invincible Lords of Nature, Marathon Media and Canal J (2008–2009)
- Gormiti: The Supreme Eclipse Era, Marathon Media and Canal J ( 2009–2010)
- Gormiti The Neorganic Evolution, Marathon Media and Canal J (2010–2011)
- The Land Before Time (2007–2008)
- Puppy in My Pocket: Adventures in Pocketville, Mondo TV and other production companies (2010–2012)
- Gormiti Nature Unleashed, Mondo TV (2012–2013)
- Dinofroz, Mondo TV (2012–2015)
- Idol x Warrior Miracle Tunes!, Boing (2017-2018)
- Gormiti: The Legend Is Back (2018–2021)

== Subsidiaries ==
- Flair Leisure Products
