= Gormiti Nature Unleashed =

- Genre: Battle Movie
- Created by: Leandro Consumi; Gianfranco Enrietto
- Based on: Gormiti by Giochi Preziosi
- Directed by: Gowa Seville
- Starring: Mondo Actors
- Opening theme: "Gormiti" performed by Giorgio Vanni
- Ending theme: "Gormiti" (ending music)
- Country of origin: Italy
- Original language: Italian
- No. of seasons: 1
- No. of episodes: 26

Production
- Producer: Ness Miller
- Running time: 26 minutes
- Production companies: Giochi Preziosi; Mondo TV

Original release
- Network: Italia 1 Cartoon Network; Boing
- Release: September 17, 2012 – January 9, 2013

Related
- Gormiti (2008); Gormiti (2018)

Gormiti Nature Unleashed is an Italian CGI animated series co-produced from Giochi Preziosi and Mondo TV, based on the Gormiti toy line series. It is unrelated with the first Gormiti TV series.

After the first Gormiti series success among Italy and Europe, production companies decided to revive it in a combination of 3D and computer-generated animation in high definition. According to Michelle Azoury, head of sales and brand manager at Mondo TV, it "does not discount the earlier series but does not directly address it either."

It is broadcast in over 130 countries worldwide.

== Plot ==
Three thousand years ago, Magor, the Volcano tribe's dreaded leader, was at the zenith of his power. His dark rage and volcanic powers threatened to consume the entire island along with every living Gormiti. Magor was repelled only through combat and power of the Invincible Lords of Nature. Called from the other four tribes – Earth, Air, Sea, and Forest – they were guided by their mysterious benefactor, the Old Sage.

The Lords knew that a victory against Magor was temporary if the source of their newfound power remained intact. The wisest among the original Lords devised a plan to divide the source of all their power, The Heart of Gorm, into four Gorm Stones, and hide each piece deep within their respective kingdoms. To ensure that these Gorm Stones remained forever apart, the Lords decided to construct massive, impenetrable walls separating their formerly unified kingdoms for all time. To further ensure Magor was lost to time, each Lord allowed Old Sage to remove their memories of the Gorm Stone locations from their minds.

It was an enormous price to pay. The Gormiti had forged a wonderful society by living and working together. However, if peace was to prosper, there was no other way. Or so they thought. Each of the Elemental Lords of Gorm retreated to his kingdom, sealing it off from his allies forever. The legends of this epic battle and the willpower it took to complete it lived on through generations in the form of a story known as The Way. The story is a roadmap that details the legendary Lords' plans for hard fought peace and provides hope for future generations to continue The Way.

And for over three thousand years the peace has lasted...Until today...

The day young Agrom, prince of the Earth Tribe, found a crack in his kingdom's wall...

== List of episodes ==
1. Pilot
2. The Air up There
3. Raging Waters
4. Deep Roots
5. The Fifth Stone
6. Gerz So Good
7. Rivers of Fire
8. Burning Heart
9. The Sky Is Falling
10. Riptide
11. Power Play
12. Brotherhood
13. The Fire Doors of Perception
14. Fire Brand
15. The Portal of Fire
16. The Pisces War
17. Fire in the Sky
18. If a Tree Falls
19. The Stone And The Glass
20. The Sacrifice
21. The Face In The Sand
22. The Beast Of Eagle's Peak
23. A Shadow of Hope
24. Everything in its Place
25. All for One
26. To All Things... an Ending

== Broadcast ==
Country	Channel
Italy	Cartoon Network; Boing; Italia 1
Serbia	Ultra
United States	Cartoon Network
United Kingdom	Cartoon Network
Ireland	Cartoon Network
Spain	Boing
France	Canal J Gulli
Mexico	Televisa
Malaysia	TV2
Australia	Eleven
Netherlands	Cartoon Network
Poland	Cartoon Network
Hungary	Cartoon Network
Romania	Cartoon Network
Moldova	Cartoon Network
Denmark	Cartoon Network
Finland	Cartoon Network
Norway	Cartoon Network
Sweden	Cartoon Network
United Arab Emirates	Cartoon Network Arabic
Cyprus	Cartoon Network MEA
Greece	Nickelodeon; Star Channel
Portugal	Canal Panda
Israel	Arutz HaYeladim
Turkey	Cartoon Network
Bulgaria	Cartoon Network
