= Sandokan: The Tiger of Malaysia =

Italian-French animated children's television series

- Genre: Adventure; Drama
- Created by: Orlando Corradi
- Directed by: Marco Pagot
- Music by: Guido & Maurizio De Angelis
- Countries of origin: Italy; France; South Korea
- Original languages: English; Italian
- No. of episodes: 26

Production
- Producer: Orlando Corradi
- Running time: 26 minutes
- Production company: Mondo TV

Original release
- Network: Rai 1
- Release: November 2, 1998 – 1999

Sandokan: The Tiger of Malaysia (Italian: Sandokan - La tigre della Malesia) is a 1998 Italian-French animated series directed by Marco Pagot.

Co-produced by Rai Fiction, Mondo TV and TF1, it consists of 26 episodes and has creative liberties taken from Emilio Salgari's Indo-Malayan cycle. Regarding the original romances, nearly all characters were younger and the stories in the individual works are mixed with each other. In addition, shooting and gun fight scenes were also softened, as the violence "shown with the footage is often stronger", according to the director. Animation was done at the South Korean studio Hahn Shin Corporation. The soundtrack was composed by Guido & Maurizio De Angelis (Oliver Onions), who made a shortened version of the theme song they made for the 1976 Sandokan miniseries.

It aired on Rai 1 during Solletico from 3 November 1998, each Monday and Friday; alongside the airing came a wave of merchandising. It was followed by Sandokan: The Tiger Roars Again (2001) and Sandokan: The Two Tigers (2008) and also a board game (Sandokan – Il gioco dei pirati) published by Editrice Giochi.

== Plot ==
Young Malay Sandokan lives in Singapore with his tutor Macassar, until he, on his deathbed, reveals his origins: Sandokan's father was the Rajah of the Kiltar, and all of his family was exterminated by Dayak mercenaries; Sandokan embarks on a journey to find the governor of British Malaysia James Brooke, who wishes to interpelate in the hope of knowing his past better, unaware of Brooke's involvement in the crime. On his journey, he sets a friendship with adventurer Yanez de Gomera, an intelligent Portuguese which he saved from an attack, and with Kammamuri, an Indian child. Following a shipwreck, Sandokan ends up in Mompracem, a nest of pirates, and with tricks and deceptions, he ends up becoming their leader. Later, she falls inlove with Marianna (Pearl of Labuan), nephew of James Brooke, who he saves from her uncle and joins the group, sharing their adventures. At the end, Brooke's evil plans are exposed and he gets arrested.

== Main characters ==
- Sandokan: son of the Rajah of the Kiltars and only survivor of the massacre of his family. He was saved by his father's faithful servant and once he grew up, the truth regarding his family is told and sweares to avenge against Governor James Brooke. He founds the Tigers of Momprazem and begins his series of events to obtain justice and to liberate his father's kingdom.
- Yanez de Gomera: a young Portuguese man, lover of beautiful women and games of chance. He always carries an amulet with him, a "Zuk", which predicts danger or his absence, and is followed by a chameleon, Pacho, who sometimes does funny things, which annoys Yanez, but sometimes helps him in any affair. He becomes more than a friend for Sandokan and always follows him in his adventures.
- Lady Marianna (Pearl of Labuan): niece of James Brooke adaptaiton. Unlike his uncle, she is kind and good, courageous, less scrupulous in her nobility etiquette, attached to her governess Nani, and, in particular, after the tale of Sandokan on the death of the Kiltar royals, does not approve the governor's mode of acting. She finds Sandokan, passed out, on a beach, and falls in love with him at first sight. She loves to ride horses and playing the biolin, both things Brooke does not find appropriate to her education.
- Kammamuri: an Indian boy which initially travelled in a pirate ship trying to find his brother Tremal-Naik, to the landing platform of the pirates in the secret island of Mompracem, becomes a friend and young member of the Tigers of Mompracem guided by Sandokan. Over the course of the story, first he finds his tiger friend Darma and, later, his brother.
- Tremal-Naik: Kammamuri's older brother, who was a recluse at the penitentiary of the Rajah of Sarawak. He was evaded by Sandokan and, in the course of their adventure, finds and falls in love with Ada Moreland.
- James Brooke: Governor of British Malaya, who took part in the extermination of the family of the Rajah of the Kiltars for owning their diamond mines. He is not limited to what he wants, even dying if necessary. He profoundly hates Sandokan for blocking him in multiple occasions. At the end, his actions are discovered (which can refer to unfounded accusations made against him to pay sums of money) and is subsequently condemned and jailed. His successor was Lord Guillonk.
- Lord Guillonk: Brooke's strict collaborator, in this adaptation he is not Marianna's uncle, but rather a pretendand, and Brooke gives his own consensus for marriage. The governor considers him to be not very understanding and not so smart, while trying to save Marianna's reputation, and indirectly that of Brooke, after the girl spent time with Sandokan and the Tigers. At the end of the series he finds out and reports to the British Crown the extermination of the Kiltar royals, leading to Brooke's deposition from the governorate of Labuan.
- Suyodhana: priest of the sect decidated to the worship of goddess Kālī. He kidnapped Ada when she was a child to make her a priestess of the goddess, teaching her magic and spells. When his sect was dismantled, he tries to find ways to restore it, kidnapping another girl, as well as killing Sandokan, temporarily aligning with Brooke, but his plans are futile and ends up in prison, alongside the governor and other evildoers.
- Ada Moreland: a young girl kidnapped by Suyodhana and kept captive at a temple until she could become a priestess. She was freed by Tremal-Naik, with which she falls in love with.
- Surama: a young Indian from Assam, kidnapped by the parents and sold to the Sultan of the Varuni, becoming, for years, part of his harem's group dance. Escaped thanks to the Tigers, she falls in love with Yanez.

== Production ==
The series caters an 8-12 demographic; while, at launch, it also catered to the audience that watched the original series. To cater to the core target demographic, the violence had to be softened out, and the characters were made younger, a problem which was apparent during production. Pagot wanted Sandokan to be in his thirties, but RAI ordered the character to be younger, while Yanez lost his mustache.

Simultaneously with its release came a series of merchandise: puppets, plushes, a board game, video games and a CD-ROM, which earned RAI the recovery of over 11 billion lire it invested.
