= The Legend of Snow White =

Japanese TV anime series

- 白雪姫の伝説
- Based on: Snow White by Brothers Grimm
- Developed by: Naruhisa Arakawa
- Directed by: Kunitoshi Okajima
- Music by: Hiroki Kikuta
- Countries of origin: Japan; Italy
- Original language: Japanese
- No. of episodes: 52

Production
- Executive producer: Ippei Kuri
- Producer: Hirotoshi Ookura
- Running time: 24 minutes
- Production companies: Mondo TV; Tatsunoko Production

Original release
- Network: NHK-BS2 (Japan)
- Release: 6 April 1994 – 29 March 1995
- Network: Italia 1 (Italy)
- Release: 6 October – 26 November 1994

The Legend of Snow White (白雪姫の伝説, Shirayuki Hime no Densetsu) is a Japanese-Italian anime series produced by Tatsunoko Production and Mondo TV, based on the 1812 European fairy tale. Directed by Kunitoshi Okajima, the series premiered on NHK on 6 April 1994 and ran for 52 episodes until its conclusion on 29 March 1995.

The series uses two pieces of theme music: one opening theme, "Heart no mori e tsuretette" by Miki Sakai with Red Dolphins, and one ending theme, "Folk Dance" (フォークダンス, Foku Dansu) by Mebae Miyahara. The original score was written by video game composer Hiroki Kikuta.

== Plot ==
The story starts with the birth of a beautiful princess whose skin was as white as snow, hair like ebony and lips like the red color of the roses. Her parents, King and Queen of the Emerald Valley, name her Snow White. The little girl grows happy and healthy, and when her 4th birthday arrives, her parents give her three delightful pets for her presents: a puppy, a cat and a dove.

Soon, Queen Isabelle falls ill and dies, after which Lady Chrystal takes her place, who turns out to be not only an evil, selfish, ambitious woman, she also indulges in the black art of sorcery.

After the king's departure, she makes life difficult for Snow White, although Prince Richard does a bit to liven up the life of the young princess. Later, when the Evil Queen makes an attempt to kill Snow White due to her famed beauty, the little girl ends up in a cozy little cottage, house to the seven dwarfs who eventually befriend her and conjure to protect her from all harms inflicted by her stepmother.

Queen Chrystal tries to take the life of Snow White several times: once by a poisoned ribbon, another time with an enchanted comb, and times at which the dwarfs save her with help from their Book of Knowledge. But during the Queen's last attempt, she finally succeeds to put her in an enchanted sleep - by means of a poisoned apple - in order to take over her body, for hers is aging rapidly due to use of sorcery against a pure soul.

== Characters ==
- King Conrad: King of the Emerald Valley, he is heartbroken when his beloved queen passes away, but agrees to fulfill her last wish so that his young daughter, Snow White, can be brought up and educated by a mother.
- Queen Isabelle: First Queen consort of Emerald Valley and wife to King Conrad, she dies when her daughter, Snow White, is only 4 years old. Her dying wish is for her little girl to be raised up by a new mother.
- Molly: Queen Isabelle's personal maid and head over all castle staff, Molly takes care of Snow White; until an unfortunate event occurs and she is banished from the castle.
- Snow White: Voiced by Yuri Amano. A beautiful and kind-hearted girl, the princess of Green Valley and the titular protagonist of the show, Snow White lives happy; until war breaks out in the kingdom and her father is forced to leave her in the care of her then-loving stepmother. Not long time would come to pass until her stepmother would force her away from the castle.
- Lady/Queen Chrystal: Voiced by Mari Yokoo. Ruling over a small neighbouring kingdom, she comes to the Emerald Valley in order to marry King Conrad and to raise his daughter, the young Snow White. She is famed for her beauty, which she desperately worships above anything else and she would stop at nothing to rest the fairest woman in the land. She is evil, selfish and ambitious and dabbles in the art of sorcery.
- Speck, Spirit of the Mirror: Speck's origins are unknown at the beginning, just as those of the object inside which he resides, reflecting the truth. Through enchantments, he is able to respond to whoever calls him from the mortal world and is obliged to answer truthfully.
- Prince Richard: Voiced by Takehito Koyasu. The son of King of Albertville, a close ally of Conrad, he falls in love with princess Snow White, but is soon called to join his father in battle. Torn from his beloved not only by his unknowing father, but also by the jealous Queen, he fights to find the whereabouts of the princess and to restore her rank.
- Samson: The court huntsman and direct subject to the sovereign and, that is, the Queen, he is obliged to take the heart of the young princess back to Chrystal, but, before he could decide not to do the deed, he saves Snow White from a ravaging black bear and tells her what her stepmother's plans are and advises her to go into hiding. Afterwards, he retires to the countryside and occasionally comes across Snow White and her friends and helps them with their matters at hand.
- Boss: Voiced by Hiroshi Naka. The chief of the dwarf coven and the eldest and wisest of them all, he bears the staff which shows his rank. He is meditative but when necessary he can be harsh and speak in accordance with his function. He consults the Book of Knowledge when needed, as in the case of the young princess' arrival to their cottage.
- Gourmet/Gurume: Voiced by Junichi Sugawara. The dwarf who is at all times responsible with the food, he takes Snow White in right away and when she fails to take over his responsibilities, he is willing to teach her how to cook and clean the house.
- Woody: Voiced by Nobuyuki Furuta. The one who takes care of the hardcore chores, Woody is a fine wood chopper and is the most reluctant to take Snow White in. Sensible on the inside though, he is the last to agree with her staying, but the first one to give her a gift and by doing so, setting the other dwarfs off to do the same.
- Goldie/Goldy: Voiced by Kôzô Shioya. Although Goldie's strength and wish for labor might make him look rough around the edges, he is a caring and loving dwarf, who at one point even desires to exchange his life for Snow White's.
- Chamomile: Voiced by Katsume Suzuki. A calm and shy dwarf, Chamomile is the coven's expert in herbs, mushrooms or any other sort of plant, being able to prepare powerful sleeping draughts or transformation potions, so that one can disguise and venture for a few hours into the world of humans.
- Vet/Pet: Voiced by Wataru Takagi. Vet is a very caring dwarf, but also very fearful and is quiet, as he takes great care of animals. Beneath this particular trait, however, lies another, bravery, which comes to the surface when one of his most precious friends is in grave danger. He mans every activity around the house which involves the pets, two goats, one lamb and a chicken.
- Jolly: Voiced by Tetsuya Iwanaga. Even though Jolly is 50 years old, he is the youngest of the dwarfs and is considered to be the most inexperienced. But beneath his stubbornness and childlike appearance lies a true heart, capable of doing anything to defend Snow White (as he likes him from the first time he sees her) even argue with his co-inhabitants to let her stay and is accompanying her almost all the time.
- Poppie/Pokke: Voiced by Akiko Hiramatsu. Poppie is born out of the egg Jolly finds and is brought up by the latter, helped by Snow White. He helps the little dwarf community when the evil Queen Chrystal turns her wrath onto the forest.
- Gobby: Gobby, Prince over the Goblin Kingdom, develops an affection towards Snow White's beauty and desires to take her as his wife by force. That is, of course, until Jolly decides to confront him.
- Memole: Close friend and advisor to Gobby, Memole is secretly in love with him and decides to help Snow White escape from the unwanted marriage.
- Mylfee: A little fairy that Snow White and Jolly encounter along the way, Mylfee can control the wind... or not. Everything she tries to do ends up with a catastrophe until a small being helps her overcome this.
- Mylarka, the Sage from the Sword: Little is known of Mylarka's past, except for the fact that a disaster had occurred which tore her from her realm and into the mortal world. Mylarka and her beloved were imprisoned by an evil witch in a mirror and a sword respectively, none of them knowing the location of the other, so that they would be unable communicate. That was until the step-daughter of the evil witch made her way to the cave in which Mylarka's Sword lies in stone.
- Jack: A "mocking boy" as he is referenced to, Jack is a young man who at first dislikes Snow White and mocks her appearance, but he ends up falling in love with her. We find out very late in the series that he is a Genie of the Forests, when the Queen summons him and asks him to do her bidding.

== Expernal links ==
- The Legend of Snow White at Tatsunoko
- The Legend of Snow White at Mondo TV:
  - In English
  - In Japanese
