= Gormiti (2018 TV series) =

- Genre: Action, Adventure, Comedy
- Based on: Gormiti by Giochi Preziosi
- Written by: Romain Van Liemt
- Directed by: Freddy Córdoba Schwaneberg; Roger Córdoba Schwaneberg
- Opening theme: English: "The Heralds of Gorm" performed by Daniel Belenguer; Italian: "Gormiti the Legend is Back" performed by Giorgio Vanni
- Composer: Banjo Soundscapes
- Countries of origin: Italy; Spain
- Original languages: Italian; Spanish
- No. of seasons: 3
- No. of episodes: 79

Production
- Executive producers: David Diéguez Redondo; Enrico Preziosi; Dario Bertè; Matteo Preziosi; Lorenzo Bombelli; Luca Lunghi
- Running time: 11 minutes
- Production companies: Giochi Preziosi; Planeta Junior; Kotoc Produccions

Original release
- Network: Boing / Clan (Spain); Rai Gulp / RaiPlay / Rai Yoyo (Italy)
- Release: 1 October 2018 – 20 July 2021

Related
- Gormiti (2008); Gormiti Nature Unleashed

Gormiti is a CGI animated television series co-produced by Giochi Preziosi, Planeta Junior and Kotoc Produccions, based on the toy line of the same name. Unrelated to the two prior animated series in the franchise, the show was first unveiled at MIPJunior in October 2017. It began airing in United States, Spain, and Italy in the fall of 2018.

== Broadcast ==
The series premiered in Spain on Boing on September 10, 2018, and then on Clan, ETB 3, À Punt and Neox. In Italy, the first five episodes were released through TIMvision and RaiPlay on September 21, 2018, ahead of its linear television debut on Rai Gulp and Rai Yoyo on October 1, 2018.

In Canada, the series debuted in English on Teletoon on April 5, 2019. It later aired on the French-language Télétoon on May 10, 2019. In France, the series premiered on January 9, 2019, on Canal J, in April 2019 on Gulli Africa, and on May 30 on Gulli. In Portugal, it aired on Panda Kids. In Croatia, it aired on RTL Kockica. In Uzbekistan, it aired on Aqlvoy. In Kazakhstan, it aired on Balapan. In the United Kingdom, the series began airing on CITV on September 2, 2019. In Greece, the series began airing on Keedoo in September 2019. In Tatarstan, the series began airing on Shayan TV in November 2023. In Russia, the series began airing on Karusel TV on July 12, 2019. In Turkey, the series began airing on Cartoon Network on March 2, 2020. In the Middle East and North Africa, the series began airing on Spacetoon and Majid Kids TV in September 2019. In Brazil, the series began airing on Gloob and Globoplay in 2025. In Latin America, the series began airing on Canela TV in 2025. In Sri Lanka, the series began airing on TV Derana in 2021. In CEE, it aired on Prima Max and TVP ABC. In Estonia, it aired on KidZone Max. In Israel, it aired on Zoom. In the US, it was distributed on Netflix, Tubi TV, The Roku Channel, Prime Video, Pluto TV, and YouTube.
