= Gormiti =

Toy property

- Two Gormiti figures, "Crabs the Avenger" and "Mimeticus"
- Created by: Leandro Consumi (concept); Gianfranco Enrietto (design)
- Original work: Italy
- Owner: Giochi Preziosi Group
- Years: 2005–present

Films and television
- Television series: Gormiti (2008); Gormiti Nature Unleashed; Gormiti (2018); Gormiti Legends; Gormiti – The New Era

Games
- Video games: Gormiti: The Masters of Gorm Island (2006); Gormiti: Lotta Oscura (2007); Gormiti: Agguato nella Valle (2007); Gormiti: The Lords of Nature! (2010); Gormiti: Shards of Power (2013)

Official website
- gormiti.it

Gormiti: The Invincible Lords of Nature (Italian: Gormiti: Gli Invincibili Signori della Natura), or simply Gormiti, is an Italian media franchise based primarily on 2 in (51 mm) tall non-articulated mini action figures with a trading card game play aspect.

The toys were created in Italy in 2005 by Leandro Consumi and Gianfranco Enrietto for the toy company Giochi Preziosi.

== Toys ==
Gormiti is a line of collectible plastic miniature monster figures created in Italy by Giochi Preziosi in 2005. The figures are typically sold in blind bags together with trading or playing cards describing each character and its abilities. Although primarily marketed toward children aged 4–8 for imaginative play, the figures also developed a significant adult collector community.

Within the franchise's mythology, the Gormiti are elemental warriors who inhabit the fictional island of Gorm. The characters are divided into rival factions, traditionally aligned with natural elements such as Sea, Forest, Air, Earth, and Lava. These tribes are often grouped into broader alliances representing forces of good and evil, in a fantasy setting inspired by heroic and mythological themes.

The toy line's distribution model relied heavily on blind packaging, preventing buyers from choosing specific figures. This encouraged collecting, trading, and the purchase of duplicate figures, contributing to the growth of a secondary collector market. The commercial success of the franchise led to a wide range of related merchandise, including magazines, DVDs, video games, theatrical productions, and several animated television series.

The figures are part of a broader tradition of collectible miniature monster toys popular in Europe and Japan. Commentators and collectors have frequently compared Gormiti to earlier toy lines such as Exogini, which Giochi Preziosi distributed in Italy during the 1980s. Exogini itself was an Italian adaptation of Japanese Kinnikuman-inspired Kinkeshi figures. Like Exogini, early Gormiti figures were made from rigid coloured plastic and emphasized collectibility, faction-based lore, and stylized monster designs.

== TV series ==
=== Gormiti (2008) ===
The first animated television series based on the Gormiti toy franchise, Gormiti, was co-produced by Giochi Preziosi and Marathon Media. The series premiered in Italy on Italia 1 on 27 October 2008. According to trade publication C21Media, the series attracted more than one million viewers per episode during its initial run on Mediaset.

==== Seasons ====
The series consisted of three seasons: Gormiti: The Lords of Nature Return!, Gormiti: The Supreme Eclipse Era! and Gormiti: The Neorganic Evolution.

=== Gormiti Nature Unleashed ===
A second series, Gormiti Nature Unleashed, produced in CGI, began airing in Italy in 2012. Apart from the setting and some characters, it is unrelated to the first TV series.

=== Gormiti (2018) ===
A third series, Gormiti, began airing in 2018.

=== Gormiti Legends ===
A fourth series, Gormiti Legends further reboot of the franchise, which features some of the first Gormiti characters, released in Italy exclusively on the web, while in Spain also on television on the Clan television channel. It's about of a series of 10 episodes of 3 or 4 minutes each.

=== Gormiti - The New Era ===
A fifth series Gormiti – The New Era, is in the works at Italian production company Rainbow. It will be a live-action show, coming in 2024 and it costed nearly 15 millions euros. The first two seasons have already been shot, each one is made of 10 episodes. The series was filmed in Italy.

== Video games ==
Between 2006 and 2007, Engine Software developed three video games based on the Gormiti toy franchise for the DigiBlast handheld console, following Giochi Preziosi's investment in the platform:

- Gormiti: The Masters of Gorm Island (2006).
- Gormiti: Lotta Oscura (2007).
- Gormiti: Agguato nella Valle (2007).

In September 2010, Konami released Gormiti: The Lords of Nature! for the Nintendo DS and Wii. The game was primarily based on the first season of the 2008 animated series.

In January 2013, Gormiti: Shards of Power was released for Android and iOS. Based on the Nature Unleashed toy line, the game combined puzzle-action gameplay with an interactive feature that allowed players to unlock in-game content by scanning physical Gormiti figures. The game is no longer available on the App Store or Google Play.
