= Bondi Band =

- Genre: Action; Adventure; Superhero; Comedy
- Created by: Paula Vendetti; Pablo Feldman; Jonathan Hofman; Pablo Lewin; Gustavo Reinoso
- Voices of: Lyon Smith; Michael Adamthwaite; David Berni; Stacey DePass; Lee Tockar; Scott McNeil; Tim Hamaguchi; Christian Potenza; Kazumi Evans; Ashleigh Ball; Nicole Oliver
- Theme music composer: Marce Andino; Hal Beckett; Mike Shields; Brad Breeck; Rusty Andrews
- Composers: Rusty Andrews; Brad Carow; Bill Fulton; John Gonzalez
- Countries of origin: Argentina; Spain; Italy; Canada
- Original language: Spanish
- No. of seasons: 1
- No. of episodes: 52

Production
- Running time: 10 minutes
- Production companies: IAM Cartoon Projects; Exim Licensing Group; LedaFilms; Mondo TV

Original release
- Network: Disney XD
- Release: May 20, 2010 – September 3, 2012

Bondi Band is an animated television series created by Paula Vendetti, Pablo Feldman, Jonathan Hofman, Pablo Lewin and Gustavo Reinoso, it was produced by IAM Cartoon Projects and co-produced by companies Exim Licensing Group, LedaFilms and Mondo TV. It was originally aired in Disney XD in 2012.

== Plot ==
In prehistoric times a strange pink stone with an imaginable power crashed on Earth. This stone was responsible for the extinction of the dinosaurs, getting buried under the ground for thousands of years. Tony, Laila, Azim, Nina, David and Boris are six friends who live an ordinary life in the city of Vila Tornasol, to discover the plans of the malicious Miss C. Lebrity. Her goal is to dominate the world using the effects of the pink stone, doing everything to remove it from the center of the Earth. Due to this, the kids are chosen by the guard of Vila Tornasol, Peter Solfa, to protect their city from attacks by the villain. The children form the literal "band" of superheroes, and utilize the powers of their magical instruments.

== Characters ==
- Tony Macarroni - is the leader and guitarist of the Hexarock band, whose owned genre is Rock. He is very egocentric, and cares about his appearance as well as trying to impress girls. His best friend is Laila, whom he calls "Principessa" (Princess in Italian). His power is to shoot rays out of his guitar. When he activates his special power, "Rock'n Roll", he is able to shoot even more powerful rays.
- Laila Love - is the vocalist and co-leader of the Hexarock band, whose owned genre is Blues. She is blind, but has her other senses sharpened. Due to this Laila is sensitive to sounds and smells. Her best friend is Tony, whom she calls "Rockstar". She is also the most calm and safe member of the team. Her power is to issue all types of gas. When her staff activates her special power, "Brave Blues," it creates a force field of protection against any attack.
- David Creplaj - is the band's bassist and owner of the Hexarock band, whose owned genre is Ska. He is the youngest member of the team who gets scared easily and often and often screams for his mother. He is also in love with Roxy, but never manages to get her attention except when they're transformed. His power is super speed with his skates and turbos. When he activates his special power, "Super Ska Attack", he is able to create a tornado and run at high speed.
- Nina Olsen - is the band's keyboardist and the owner of the Pop genre. She is the most sensitive and shy of the team. Nina worries about her friends a lot, and is also a vegetarian. She wears a pair of glasses and crane, and braces on her teeth, and sometimes spits due to her braces. Her power is to shoot fluids from her keyboard. When she activates her special power, "Pop Power", she is able to freeze enemies by changing the fluid's state of matter.
- Azim Ali - is the band's DJ and the owner of the Hip Hop genre. The smartest member of the group, Azim is a total technological buff. He also appears the least during battles, preferring to do more calculations during fights instead of fighting. He also control's the bus's bandwidth. His power is to detect the stone's raises in power and create virtual calculations. When he activates his special power, "Hip Hop Hologram", he creates holograms.
- Boris Massa - is the band's drummer and the owner of the Heavy Metal genre. He might be chubby and greedy, but he's strong enough to fight with his friends. He dreams of being a great drummer. His power is throwing dishes, which are able to cut and deliver sonic waves. When he activates his special power, "Heavy Force", hebecomes stronger with armor mechanics.
- Peter Solfa - An inventor, musician, and mentor to the band, and also a legend in Vila Tornasol, he gave the boys the Hexarocks. Miss C. Lebrity, using her newly discovered Pink Stone Energy, traps the unsuspecting Peter in a nearly indestructible bubble in space so that no one can stop her. However, he couldn't prevent himself from indirectly helping the band. On one occasion, he manages to break free from his prison, but Miss C. Lebrity locks him up again at the end of the same episode.
- Miss C. Lebrity - The villain. She is the richest woman in Villa Tornasol, seen by everyone except the Bondi Band as kind and sensible. She seeks to obtain a large pink stone in the center of the Earth in order to dominate the world. She'll do absolutely anything to get it. She is often hindered by the Bondi Band. Nevertheless, she has a small piece of the pink stone, which she uses to infect living beings, turning them into monsters to end the Bondi Band. She is always accompanied by her bumbling sidekick, Mike Chong, who demonstrates a liking towards her.
- Roxy Lebrity - She is the daughter of Miss C. Lebrity, and is spoiled, rich, and selfish. She finds herself to be better than everyone and is always accompanied by three girls she calls her "accomplices". David is in love with her, but she despises him when he's transformed, without knowing his secret identity. She calls Tony "Mysterious Guitarist". She also dreams of being part of the Bondi Band.
- Mike Chong - The bumbling sidekick to Miss C. Lebrity. He does everything to satisfy his "lady" and demonstrates to be in love with her sometimes. He's not quite smart but he's great at disguising his lady's dirty work. His biggest dream besides winning his lady is becoming a Latin pop singer.
