= The Jungle Book (1989 TV series) =

Italian-Japanese anime television series

- ジャングルブック 少年モーグリ
- Based on: The Jungle Book by Rudyard Kipling
- Written by: Kimio Yabuki
- Directed by: Fumio Kurokawa
- Music by: Hideo Shimazu
- Countries of origin: Japan; Italy
- Original language: Japanese
- No. of episodes: 52

Production
- Executive producer: Koichi Motohashi
- Producers: Shinsuke Kurabayashi; Shunichi Kozo
- Production companies: TV Tokyo; Nippon Animation

Original release
- Network: TXN (TV Tokyo)
- Release: 2 October 1989 – 29 October 1990

The Jungle Book (ジャングルブック 少年モーグリ, Janguru Bukku Shōnen Mōguri) is an anime adaptation of Rudyard Kipling's original collection of stories, The Jungle Book co-produced by Japanese studio Nippon Animation and Italian studio Mondo TV. It aired in 1989, and consists of a total of 52 episodes.

The series was translated into various languages for global distribution and received international acclaim. It was especially popular in India, where it was dubbed into Hindi. The Indian version featured an original Hindi opening song, "Jungle Jungle Baat Chali Hai", with lyrics by Gulzar, which was later re-recorded for the Indian release of Disney's The Jungle Book (2016). It was released in the United States as The Jungle Book: Adventures of Mowgli.

== Plot ==
Mowgli is a young boy who becomes separated from his family in the jungle and is adopted by a wolf pack led by their chief, Akela. As he grows up, he learns the ways of the wild and the laws of the jungle under the guidance of Baloo the bear, Bagheera the black panther, and Kaa the Indian python. Along the way, he faces constant threats from Shere Khan, the fierce tiger who seeks to hunt humans, and his cunning companion, Tabaqui the hyena. The story follows Mowgli's journey as he struggles to earn his place among the wolves while embracing the spirit of the jungle. Eventually, he reconnects with the human world, yet continues to carry the values and lessons of the jungle within him. While the series introduces some original elements, it also faithfully adapts many of the classic Mowgli tales written by Rudyard Kipling.

== Characters ==
=== Main characters ===
- Mowgli - the series protagonist and a young boy lost in the forest of Seeonee in British India. He lost his biological parents when they went out searching for him and fell to their deaths from a cliff, and into a river, after a panther named Bagheera unintentionally frightens them. Alexander adopts him as his son and raises him as a wolf. Mowgli appears to be somewhere between the ages of 6 and 10 during the course of the show, though the first episode shows him as a toddler. He's an adventurous, fun-loving, outgoing boy, but he also goes through a sort of identity crisis, struggling to figure out just what he really is and where he really belongs. He is never without his trusty boomerang, which he fashioned from a treebranch.
- Baloo - a bluish-gray sloth bear and Mowgli's best friend. He also serves as one of Mowgli's teachers, though he is more enthusiastic and has a gentler approach in some of his lessons. Despite this, he is also a very brave and selfless crusader, fighting to defend Mowgli from a hungry mugger crocodile. Though he was thought to have been slain, he was revealed to be alive and well shortly afterward. He has a strong fondness for honey.
- Bagheera - a black panther, Mowgli's main teacher of the Laws of the Jungle, and his closest friend. He is seen as a de facto member of Mowgli's wolf pack. Bagheera spent part of his childhood in the care of an English family, though later escaped when his young caretaker was shot by her father. At the end of the series, Bagheera chooses to leave the jungle and live amongst humans with Mowgli.
- Kaa - one of Mowgli's friends, a very wise yet short-tempered rock python. He also serves as a teacher to Mowgli on a few occasions, teaching him about animals who flee from drought and showing him how to defeat the invading dholes by luring them over Bee Rocks. He is feared by a large militia of monkeys due to his short temper, as seen in episode 28.
- Kichi - Mowgli's red panda friend. His parents are killed by humans. After Mowgli accuses Kichi of causing trouble (which he unintentionally does) and being a nuisance, he has a harder time fitting in with the new crowd due to already being an outsider and decides to get on the wrong foot, but his friendship with Mowgli would be put to the test when they're prompted to work together. Later in the series, he lives together with Mowgli in his hut. In the English version, Kichi is referred to as a male. In the German version, Kichi is called Kiki. The confusion is due to the fact that the character was voiced by a woman in the Japanese version, a common practice in animation voice work for younger or cute characters.

=== Supporting characters ===
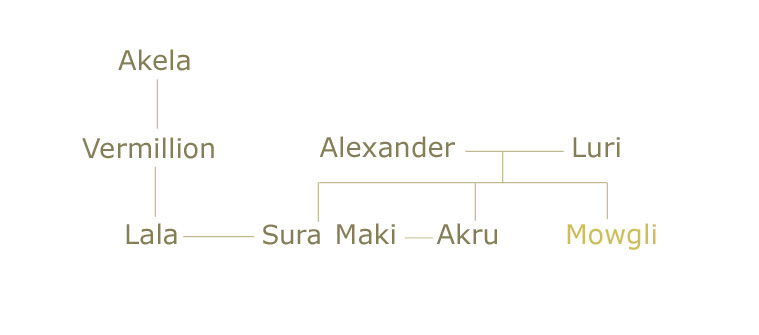
The family of the Seeonee wolf pack

- Seeonee Wolf Pack - the Indian wolf pack that adopted Mowgli.
  - Akela - the leader of the pack, notably when Mowgli is first adopted into the pack and during most of Mowgli's younger days. His coat is mostly a dark, bluish-grey hue, with a lighter shade of those colors for his eyebrows and the thicker fur on his upper body. He is very old but very knowledgeable, and is forced out of his retirement after Alexander died. Later, he serves as Luri's consultant or advisor when she takes over as pack leader. Near the series' finale, Akela would pass away by the wounds sustained from hyenas.
  - Alexander - Mowgli's wolf father, Luri's mate, and the biological father of Akru and Sura. He is blue/black furred. He becomes leader of the wolf pack when Akela chooses to retire. He has a fight with Vermillion, despite being unwilling to do so, to determine the successor to Akela's leadership, in accordance with the Law of the Jungle. During a fire that grazes the forest, Alexander dies defending his pack from Shere Khan.
  - Luri - Alexander's widow, Mowgli's wolf mother and the biological mother of Akru and Sura. Beige furred. She later becomes the official new leader of the pack and the first female leader of the pack when Akela steps down from his position once again, after originally asking Mowgli to convince Vermillion if he'd accept the request of leading. She came up with the plan of getting an ex-member of the pack named Grizzle exiled from it again, this time along with his gang, without having to battle. She is stern and protective, but also wise and kind, demonstrating great leadership skills.
  - Akru and Sura - the sons of Alexander and Luri and Mowgli's wolf brothers. Akru has brown fur, as well as some of his mother's beige fur, while Sura's is blue and black, like his father. They are only cubs when Mowgli is first adopted by the wolf couple but are fully grown in subsequent episodes. They are both very close to Mowgli and stay that way throughout the series, even after they leave home and find mates. Akru is loving and protective but has a tendency to not always look before he leaps, whereas Sura tends to be calmer and more collective. In the French version of the show, Akru was actually female and Mowgli's wolf sister; this later became a problem when the character becomes mates with Maki, and due to his voice actor being a woman, many mistook Sura as female in the English version initially. Sura's efforts to court Lala are, at first, incorrect, but in episode 24, he proves his worthiness to her by keeping a trio of crocodiles away from her long enough for Baloo to finish them. In the ninth episode, Akru was briefly exiled from the pack, but re-welcomed after Mowgli conjures a remedy to ease his injuries. Sura becomes a father of two cubs, making Akru and Mowgli uncles.
  - Vermillion - Lala's father and Alexander's great friend. He competes with Alexander to be the next leader of the pack, when his father, Akela, chooses to step down. He acquires a scar on his left eye afterwards. His fur is red in color. It is later revealed that they had also fought previously to decide which one would marry Luri. He later moves away, apparently leaving his daughter behind, and becomes the leader of a pack of wolves in a rocky desert area.
  - Bacchus - a fat wolf who can never hunt properly. He is more fitted to babysitting the wolf cubs. He appears more often in the first half of the series, and is occasionally used for comic relief. He is mentioned later on however, when everyone was discussing the topic of a new leader (one of the wolves said Bacchus should lead the pack, much to some of the other wolves' dismay), though no further mention of him occurs after that.
  - Fargas - an old wolf who was saved by Alexander from a pack of dholes. His fur is pale blue (or fully white). He steals food from the pack's storage in his first few appearances due to apparently being brainwashed by demons; he soon leaves on a journey after being purified by Bagheera, and has not returned since.
  - Lala - Vermillion's daughter and Akela's granddaughter. She has orange fur, though slightly lighter than her father's. She acts like a tomboy early in the series, and refuses to accept Mowgli as a member of the pack. Later in the series, she matures and becomes more fond of Mowgli, even developing a crush on him, as seen in the episode "Mowgli Has a Sweetheart". She soon switches to Sura when he keeps a trio of crocodiles away from her. By the end of the series, she and Sura are the parents of two cubs, one of whom is given the name Rusty in the English dub.
  - Sandah/Thunder - a young male wolf from Vermillion's pack. He is navy blue in colour. Sandah hates the humans after they killed his sister, Dulia and resents Mowgli for being a human. He eventually comes to terms with him, and even though he leaves with Vermillion and his pack, he and Mowgli appear to share a close camaraderie. Sandah seems to be a lieutenant, or beta wolf, to Vermillion. Certain translations portray him as female.
  - Maki - a golden-yellow and cream, female wolf and Akru's love interest. Maki is a great singer and, at one point, she's seen giving singing lessons to Akru. She is a minor character and appears very late in the series. In the German version she was actually male, due to the fact that Akru was female in that version of the show. She still retained her feminine looks though.
- Rikki-Tikki-Tavi - based on the character from the Jungle Book story of the same name, Rikki-Tikki is the pet Indian mongoose of Jumeirah and her family. He exhibits a similar protection towards her and her family as he did to the English family in the original short story, and extends this protective behavior to Mowgli. Rikki-Tikki kills Buldeo's pet Indian cobra after it tries to attack Mowgli in the middle of the night and later alerts Mowgli that Jumeirah and her family have been holed up by the villagers.
- Hathi - the great Indian elephant who serves as the ruler of the whole forest of Seeonee. He is usually seen accompanied by his two sons. Hathi first appeared in the series proclaiming the Water Truce at the Peace Rock during a drought and told the animals the story of How Fear Came. Hathi shows up occasionally afterwards, appearing once to help drive Grizzle away, another time to help raze the village, again to show Mowgli the Elephant Dance, and one final time in the series finale when the animals bid Mowgli farewell.
- Chil - a Brahminy kite who served as the messenger for Akela's pack and Hathi.
- Linda - a benevolent English girl (although in the American dub, neither her nor her dad speak with English accents) who adopts Bagheera as a cub and keeps as a pet. Bagheera tells Mowgli a story about her and we meet her through flashback sequences. She has a love for not just any animal, but him especially it seems. She also seems to have a grand understanding of animals through some connection. When her father attempts to whip Bagheera while Linda gives the cat milk, she defends him by shielding him and is slightly injured when he accidentally whips her instead, when she gets in the way. When her father confronts her and Bagheera again and tries shooting him, Linda makes another attempt to protect him by letting him out of his cage and setting him free. As he escapes to safety, she leaps in front of her father and takes the bullets; her exact fate is unknown, as Bagheera never found out if she survived or not.
- Bougi/Rahhar - Meshua/Jumeirah's maternal grandfather and Mari's father who Mowgli meets before meeting his granddaughter, daughter and son-in-law. He meets Mowgli when he comes across a trap/hole in which Mowgli fell. Mowgli isn't sure whether he can trust him at first because of all the stories and reputation about humans, and their history with animals, but comes to accepting Bougi's offer to help when he heals him and gives him food. He turns out to be genuinely kind-hearted. Bougi is later slashed in the back by Shere Khan, defending Mowgli and Meshua from the tiger but eventually recovers and survives. Bougi's name in the English adaptation is Rahhar.
- Mari/Meshua - Meshua/Jumeirah's mother, Bougi/Rahhar's daughter and Nil/ Sanjay's wife. When the family first meet Mowgli, Mari mistakes Mowgli for her son Keshnu, but despite the fact that it's not really him, she still treats him as if he were one of her own and he grows on her instantly. She comes to love Mowgli so much so that she desperately wishes and prefers that he not take on Shere Khan. Mari's name is changed to Meshua (Jumeirah's original name in the Japanese variant) for the English dub.
- Nil/Sanjay - Meshua/Jumeirah's father, Mari/Meshua's husband and Bougi/Anwar's son-in-law. Like the other family members, he eats up Mowgli right away. When the family is kidnapped and held captive, Mowgli rescues them and helps them escape, one way of which is by saving them from the other villagers and he has his animal friends guide them to another town when the animals destroy the residents' homes. Later, in the middle of their trek, Nil succumbs to pneumonia. Nil is renamed Sanjay in the English translation.
- Meshua/Jumeirah - a girl to whom Mowgli takes a liking late in the series. Her grandfather originally found Mowgli when the boy was on his own from his wolf pack, saying the boy reminded him of his grandson. Though Mowgli chooses to remain in the jungle at this time, he does meet his human friend later, along with Meshua. Meshua's family later adopt Mowgli into their family as their new son, since their other son had died. Her name is Jumeirah in the English version.

=== Villains ===
- Shere Khan - a Bengal tiger who is the main antagonist of the series. Cruel and cunning, rebellious and menacing, he violates many Laws of the Jungle including eating humans, eating the human's cattle, and over-hunting. He's also fearless of most things except that he's a pyrophobe (or one who fears fire), he's frightened by guns and he withdraws when it comes to Hathi taking action. His loathing for humans is part of a history that goes back to his first ancestor's encounter with one. The injury on his right hind leg is dealt by Alexander in a fight. Later, other injuries he'd receive include a piercing being made in his forehead after Mowgli attacks him with a long, narrow, sharp-edged rock; the wound over his left eye being made, again by Mowgli, slashing it with a blade in requital for slashing Mowgli's left thigh and harming one of his new human friends/future family members, leaving the tiger disfigured. In the last showdown, Mowgli defeats and slays Shere Khan.
- Tabaqui - Shere Khan's sidekick. Unlike the other versions of Jungle Book, he is a bungling striped hyena (yet he is still referred to as a jackal as he was in the original story) who never seems to get anything right. He's also notorious for being idle, greedy, incompetent, conniving, dimwitted, dastardly and chatty. Later, he and another hyena meet their defeat when Mowgli and Shere Khan go against each other once more and both hyenas are gored by water buffaloes. It is unknown if they died from being gored or merely fainted and later fled the scene.
- Louis/Alba - a bonnet macaque largely covered with white fur (except for his face, hands and feet), the leader of the other monkeys (who are mostly covered with apricot or peach-colored fur) and the principal lackey/tipster to Shere Khan. They also work for the tiger. Louis and the other monkeys constantly wreak havoc in the jungle and heckle the denizens. They are based on the Bandar-log from the stories. After Louis convinces and lures Mowgli away by telling him that he knows of a place where he can take him to learn more about the boy's kind, he and the other monkeys formed links or chains and carried Mowgli across the jungle to a temple (also known as "The Cold Lair"), where the boy learns about it having once been occupied by humans and how they showed their negative side, and qualities, when it came to greed for treasure, as they searched for it in the edifice. Some also tricked Kichi into playing with them as an attempt to draw her/him into Shere Khan's clutches, and the monkeys also bother Mowgli again when the wolves act coldly towards him, and later destroy his hut. He, along with several, other monkeys, harass Mowgli and demolish his hut under the order of Grizzle the wolf. He is eventually caught and confronted by Mowgli, Bagheera, Baloo and Kaa, who warns him to put an end to that and turn down any other instructions Shere Khan may give him. Following this encounter, the monkeys in league with Shere Khan flee whenever they see Mowgli, and they (or a similar band of monkeys) make their final appearance kidnapping Jumeirah, dropping her and fleeing when Mowgli comes to her rescue. Louis is known as Alba in the English dub.
- Grizzle/Bunto - a wolf with beige (or grey, as he appears in some scenes) fur and a dark brown blotch around his left eye, a follower of Shere Khan and former member of Akela's pack. He has the distinction of being the only wolf in the series with any markings on his face and is also missing a large portion of his left ear. He was once a good wolf who had gone bad and got kicked out years ago for not abiding by the law of the jungle, which has since made him bitter as a result, and turned to the dark side after meeting Shere Khan, who put him up to getting revenge for his banishment. Grizzle was the leader of a gang and accompanied by two other lupines, who were also his henchmen. Later, after a battle with Mowgli's friends and some of the other wolves, Grizzle is slain by Mowgli, who stabs him in the jugular with a stone-knife. Bunto is Grizzle's name in the Japanese and German versions.
  - Kim/Dusty & Sargah/Jocko - two wolves whom end up in league with Grizzle and his cronies. The two decide to overthrow Akela so Jocko himself can become leader of the pack. They are father and son, Jocko being the parent, who has a dark blue/light blue hue, and Dusty is his offspring, who is dark grey/beige. Being wide-eyed (literally and figuratively), both are also credulous. Jocko isn't very courageous, being rather skittish and nebbish (Dusty also seems to get his usual deportment from him apparently). In the Japanese version, their names were originally Kim & Sargah.
- Dholes - marauding red dogs who live in the jungle. Mowgli first encounters a few when they enter Rahhar's campsite where he is. They drive them off by making noise via banging on pots and pans. Later, Mowgli gets rid of a larger number of them driven into the jungle by drought by luring them to a beehive and they're chased off by the swarm of bees. To escape them, they jump into a river, then when they swim their way out of it, they're mauled to death by the wolves.
- Linda's Father - a selfish, malevolent and commercially minded game hunter who is only out for his own personal gain, determined to claim Bagheera as his prize and constantly stops at nothing to get him. He always mistreats the feline sadistically if and when disobedient, like when Bagheera wouldn't eat the meat that was presented to him. But after several attempts, they're always thwarted by his daughter, who incessantly interferes with his goal, until she sacrifices herself and is hit by the gunshots.
- Buldeo - an old hunter from the village who always tells tall tales about his supposed encounters with the jungle animals. After one story involving the tiger Shere Khan that he tells the other villagers, Mowgli begs to differ and refutes it when he sets out, and attempts to have the final showdown with Shere Khan. After Mowgli slays Shere Khan and returns to the village with the tiger skin, Buldeo, whom was foiled in his attempt to take the pelt for himself, convinces the other villagers that Mowgli is a sorcerer. Especially after Buldeo, some other men, and boys observe his ability to call his animal friends seemingly through the will of magic and they turn against Mowgli (except for his newfound, adoptive, human family). He thereafter organizes against Mowgli's adoptive family, trying to frame them as sorcerers and witches through their association with Mowgli, using it as a cover-up to get their land and wealth, even attempting to hunt Mowgli with Riswan. Their attempts to do both are foiled, however, by Mowgli and his animal friends, who leave them stranded in fear far from the village and free Jumeirah and her family. Later, when the village is attacked by the animals, Buldeo tries to shoot Bagheera, Sura and Akru. Mowgli then grabs Buldeo's rifle as the hunter pleads for the boy to not harm him as Mowgli then breaks the rifle, scaring Buldeo away. After that, Buldeo is not seen again, but is mentioned by several villagers as well as Riswan, leaving his fate ultimately unknown.
- Ganshum - Buldeo's grandson, who along with several other boys, pick on Mowgli for being the new kid in the village and spreads rumors about the jungle boy being under some kind of spell. He gets his malevolence from his granddad and joins him and other men, and boys, in searching for the village's missing buffalo herd, as well as partaking in the kidnapping of Rahhar, Sanjay, Meshua, and Jumeirah. Ganshum is not seen again after Mowgli helps Jumeirah and her family escape, but it can be presumed that he fled with the other villagers following the animal attack on the village. His name in the English version is Ganshum, but it's unknown if this is his name in the original Japanese version or in other dubs of the series.
- Abdullah - the village headman who bands with Buldeo, Riswan and several others to frame Jumeirah and her family for witchcraft and steal their possessions. Abdullah was last seen fleeing from the village with a water buffalo in pursuit when the animals came and destroyed the villagers' homes.
- Riswan/Gallo - Buldeo's friend and another man from the village who'd later cross paths with Mowgli the second time. He convinces Mowgli to let bygones be bygones for what he tried to pull on him earlier and invite him to have some food and a drink, without any need to heed cautious suspicion, but it turns out to be a trick, as Riswan laced Mowgli's drink with a sedative, and two other men plan to sell Mowgli to a circus. He is one of the few villains in the series to succeed with his goal, as he manages to get away with selling Mowgli to the circus. His name is Gallo in the German version, but it's uncertain whether it's the same in the Japanese version as well.
- John J. Hargreaves - the white, English owner of the Bombay circus to whom Riswan sells Mowgli. He is initially skeptical of Riswan's story of Mowgli, and ponders putting him to work instead of using him as an act. Mowgli hatches his plan for escape, and he outwits Hargreaves and his two hounds, battling them on his way to freedom, showing Hargreaves that Riswan was indeed right about Mowgli's capabilities as the boy escapes.

== Episodes ==
Season	Episodes	Originally aired	
Season	Episodes	First aired	Last aired
1	52	2 October 1989	29 October 1990

== Voice cast ==
=== Japanese voice actors ===
- Urara Takano - Mowgli
- Banjou Ginga - Baloo
- Hiroya Ishimaru - Bagheera
- Issei Futamata - Tabaqui
- Mari Yokoo - Luri
- Masaru Ikeda - Alexander
- Miki Itou - Kichi
- Shigezou Sasaoka - Shere Khan
- Yōko Matsuoka - Akru
- Yuusaku Yara - Vermillion
- Yuzuru Fujimoto - Akela
- Ai Orikasa - Lala
- Akiko Yajima - Meshua (a.k.a. Jumeirah)
- Akio Ohtsuka - Sandah
- Asami Mukaidono - Baloo's mother
- Bin Shimada - Nil (a.k.a. Sanjay)
- Daisuke Gouri - Hathi
- Eken Mine - Boggy
- Hideyuki Umezu - Dusty
- Ikuya Sawaki - Chill/Linda's Father
- Kazue Ikura - Kichi's mother
- Keaton Yamada - Kaa
- Kenichi Ogata - Buldeo
- Masahiro Anzai - Bacchus
- Masashi Hirose - Tha
- Michihiro Ikemizu - Mowgli's father
- Naoko Watanabe - Linda
- Norio Iwanoto - Bunto (a.k.a. Grizzle)
- Ryuuji Saikachi - Fargas
- Shigeru Nakahara - Sura
- Tomoko Numakata - Mowgli's mother
- You Yoshimura - Log
- Yuko Sasaki - Sally

=== English voice actors ===
- Julian Bailey - Mowgli
- A.J. Henderson - Baloo
- Arthur Grosser - Bagheera
- Pauline Little - Lala
- Sonja Ball - Sura
- Suzanne Glover - Kichi
- Terrence Scammell - Kaa, Tabaqui
- Walter Massey - Akela, Alexander
- Jean Fontaine - Shere Khan
- Rick Jones - Jocko, Dusty
- Kathleen Fee - Luri
- Vlasta Vrana - Grizzle

== Music ==
The Japanese opening and closing themes, "Get UP ~Aio Shinjite~ (Get UP ~I Believe in Love~)" and "Chikyuu No Ko (地球の子 lit. "Child of the Earth") are sung by the Japanese vocalists Toshiya Igarashi and Shiori Hashimoto respectively. Music from the Japanese version of Grimm's Fairy Tale Classics was recycled for the anime.

The French version features similar opening and closing themes. The English opening and closing themes, "Wake Up" and "A Child is learning", are both sung by the American vocalist Suzi Marsh.

A song Jungle Jungle Baat Chali Hai (जंगल जंगल बात चली है) was created for Hindi dubbed version with original music by Vishal Bhardwaj, lyrics by Gulzar and sung by Amol Sahdev.

== Home media ==
In 1990, Strand VCI Entertainment released only the first seventeen episodes separately on VHS under the title of The Jungle Book. Distributed by Nippon Video, they are now out-of-print, but under its original title, the show has been released as a couple of DVD box sets of the entire series in Japan, and as select individual episodes on four DVDs (two episodes per DVD) in Australia.

In India, the entire series has been released as an eight-volume DVD box set in English and Hindi separately by Eagle Home Entertainment. An Italian dub was released in 1991. These are the few international nations (probably as far as they are known to date) in which the series has been brought to DVD.

In Philippines, An early VCDs and DVDs box set, the logo has used "Nippon Animation" seen on Epiphany Video and Heartshaper Video Philippines (Lighthouse Educational Corp) released in 2007 and 2010. (An unusual Christian film)

A couple releases in the United States by Shout! Factory, one a single disc under the title The Jungle Book: Adventures of Mowgli – The Beginning and the other a six-disc collection of the whole series titled The Jungle Book: Adventures of Mowgli – Complete Collection were released on June 18, 2013. They feature high-quality recordings of the English dub. As of 2021, both DVDs are out-of-print.

== VHS collections ==
The titles of volumes which collected multiple episodes of some of the 52 episodes on VHS tapes include but are not limited to

1. "Mowgli Begins Life in the Jungle" (75 minutes) aka "Volume 1"
2. "Laws of the Jungle" (75 minutes) aka "Volume 2"
- "A Girlfriend for Mowgli" (89 minutes)
- "A New Friend"
- "A Trip of Adventure" (over 69 minutes)
- "Alexander's Son"
- "An Old Wolf's Visit"
- "Big Time Video" (96 minutes)
- "Chilly Woods"
- "Mowgli Comes to the Jungle"
- "Sorry, Baloo!"
- "Video Funpack" (25 minutes)
