= Ultra (TV channel) =

- Ultra TV's logo, used from 2008 to 2019
- Country: Serbia
- Broadcast area: Serbia, Montenegro, Bosnia and Herzegovina and North Macedonia

Ownership
- Owner: The United Group and Luxor CO d.o.o.

History
- Launched: January 28, 2008; 18 years ago TBA (relaunch)
- Closed: August 1, 2019; 7 years ago

Ultra TV was a Serbian TV channel, which started broadcasting on January 28, 2008, at 8 A.M. It also broadcast in Montenegro, Bosnia and Herzegovina and North Macedonia. It aired a diverse number of TV programs for children and teenagers. It aired cartoons (Code Lyoko, Totally Spies!, Galactik Football, etc. mostly French production and Casper, Kirarin Revolution, Johnny Test, etc.), documentaries, and soaps.

75% of it was owned by United Group, and 25% by Luxor CO d.o.o, who created this TV channel.

On July 1, 2017, the cable operator Serbia Broadband stopped distributing Ultra TV and Mini Ultra. It was only possible to get these channels through cable operators Supernova and Posta KDS (limited availability on Supernova).

On August 1, 2019, United Group closed down Ultra TV and Mini Ultra.

== Mini Ultra ==
Mini Ultra
- Country: Serbia
- Broadcast area: Serbia, Montenegro, Bosnia and Herzegovina and North Macedonia

History
- Launched: September 6, 2011; 15 years ago TBA (relaunch)
- Closed: August 1, 2019; 7 years ago

In 2011, Ultra gained a sister channel, Mini Ultra. A few weeks later, also known as just Mini. Mini Ultra broadcast popular shows for younger kids.

Mini Ultra closed down on the same date as Ultra, August 1, 2019.

== See also ==
- Minimax (TV channel)
