= Cinderella (TV series) =

Italian-Japanese anime television series

- シンデレラ物語
- Genre: Adventure, Drama, Fantasy, Romance
- Based on: Cinderella by Charles Perrault
- Directed by: Hiroshi Sasagawa (chief)
- Country of origin: Japan
- Original language: Japanese
- No. of episodes: 26

Production
- Executive producers: Kenji Yoshida; Ippei Kuri
- Producers: Shuji Uchiyama; Masatoshi Yui
- Production companies: Tatsunoko Production; Marubeni

Original release
- Network: NHK-BS2
- Release: April 4 – October 3, 1996

Cinderella (シンデレラ物語, Shinderera Monogatari; lit. 'The Story of Cinderella') is a Japanese anime television series based on the fairytale of the same name by Charles Perrault and The Brothers Grimm. It was produced by Tatsunoko Production. The series originally aired from April 4 to October 3, 1996, comprising 26 episodes.

== Summary ==
The Story of Cinderella opens as Cinderella's life changes for the worse when her widower father leaves on a business trip. No sooner is he out of sight than Cinderella's stepmother has unceremoniously moved her two own daughters into Cinderella's room, thrown out her things, handed her a servant's dress and put her to brutal harsh menial labor. The series covers Cinderella's trials and tribulations as she tries to adapt to her new life while suffering the abuse of her stepmother and her two stepsisters. All the while, her fairy godmother, Paulette, subtly watches her and tries to influence events to fix Cinderella's life without her noticing. One of her first acts in this is to grant several of the animals of the house the power of speech, thus giving Cinderella companions in her dog Patch, a pair of mice named Chuchu and Bingo, and a bird named Pappy who provide her company as well as help with her chores. The biggest twist in the series is that Cinderella meets her Prince Charming early – except here he's the roguish Prince Charles, who has a habit of sneaking out of the castle and meets Cinderella by accident while disguised as a commoner. The two have a few misunderstandings before becoming friends and start having adventures together. Meanwhile, the villainous Duke Zaral plots against the royal family throughout the story, at times working Cinderella into his plots and machinations. The series eventually culminates in the ball in which the fairy tale ends; but with its own unique twist.

== Plot ==
Cinderella is the only daughter of a rich, widowed duke. Her mother died when she was young, leaving behind only a few keepsakes for Cinderella to remember her by. The duke has remarried, giving Cinderella a new stepmother and two stepsisters.

The story begins when Cinderella's father leaves on a long business trip. No sooner has he departed, however, than her stepfamily forces her to move to the attic and puts her to work doing all the household chores. Paulette, Cinderella's fairy godmother, secretly observes this change in circumstances and uses her magic to make Cinderella's life easier by giving four animals the power of speech: her dog, Patch, two mice, Chuchu and Bingo, and a bird, Pappy. These animals help Cinderella and keep an eye on her well-being for Paulette throughout the series.

One day, Cinderella sneaks into town and meets a pageboy who claims he serves the prince of the Emerald Castle. Cinderella quickly realizes he's lying and dubs him a fibber. Unknown to her, however, the boy is Prince Charles himself in disguise; he sneaks into town using his page's identity because he finds his lessons and princely duties boring. Cinderella's stepmother tries to exploit Cinderella's connection with the prince's page in order to marry one of her own daughters to the prince. Though the ploy fails, thanks to her meddling Cinderella eventually forgives Charles for lying to her. The two form a friendship that slowly begins to deepen into romance. While Cinderella grows more used to life as a servant, Charles begins to appreciate the importance of his own duties after witnessing her struggles firsthand.

Meanwhile, Duke Zaral is also trying to marry his daughter off to Prince Charles. Isabel is initially infatuated with Charles, but eventually realizes he does not love her and instead chooses to elope with a childhood friend.

As Cinderella and Charles go on more adventures together, they stumble across a plot to overthrow the King and Queen. Charles eventually discovers that Zaral is responsible. He succeeds in stopping the coup with Cinderella's help, but reveals his true identity to her in the process. Cinderella, heartbroken, ends their friendship, assuming that the prince would never marry a servant girl, especially after she repeatedly called him a liar.

In the aftermath of Zaral's coup, Charles's parents decide he is ready to take the throne and throw a ball in his honor, with every girl in the kingdom invited. Cinderella decides to go in order to properly say goodbye, choosing to wear her mother's dress for the occasion. However, her stepfamily mocks the outfit for being out of style and destroy her invitation before leaving without her. Paulette appears and reveals herself as Cinderella's fairy godmother. Using her magic, she fixes Cinderella's dress and invitation, as well as conjuring a carriage for her. However, she warns that the magic will only last until midnight, so Cinderella needs to leave before then.

At the ball, no one recognizes Cinderella. Charles, attracted to Cinderella because he finds her familiar, spends the whole evening with her. Cinderella loses track of time and is forced to rush out just before midnight, losing a shoe in the process.

Soon after the ball, Charles's page, Alex, begins taking the lost shoe house to house in search of the woman from the ball. Cinderella initially refuses to try the shoe on, but agrees after her animal friends reveal that she has the second shoe. She is brought back to the palace, and she and Charles become engaged.

On the day of the wedding, Zaral gives Charles poison and kidnaps Cinderella. He drags her to the top of the castle clock tower and attempts to bargain her life for the kingdom. He is interrupted by Charles, who faked his poisoning, and the two have a fierce battle which ends with Zaral falling from the tower to his death.

With peace restored, Cinderella and Charles finally marry and live happily ever after.

== Cast ==
- Maria Kawamura as Cinderella
- Masami Kikuchi as Prince Charles
- Toshiko Sawada as Cinderella's stepmother
- Keiko Konno as Catherine, Cinderella's first stepsister
- Akiko Matsukuma as Jeanne, Cinderella's second stepsister
- Yuuko Mita as Paulette, the Fairy Godmother
- Ken Narita as Alex, Charles' best friend
- Tomohiro Tsuboi as Bingo, the male mice
- Yayoi Nakazawa as Chuchu, the female mice
- Tsutomu Tsuji as Wanda/Patch, the dog
- Aki Matsushita as Pappy, the bird
- Tamao Hayashi as Misha, the cat
- Akemi Okamura as Isabelle, Charles' ex-fiancé
- Yutaka Nakano as The King, Charles' father
- Atsuko Yuya as The Queen, Charles' mother
- Kazuhiro Nakata as Zaral/Zarel, Isabelle's father

== Themes ==
English title	Japanese Title	Position	Vocalist	Used For
Love Plus Love	Ai Purasu Ai (愛プラス愛)	Japanese Opening	Judy Ongg	eps. 1–26
Newborn Love	[生まれたての愛]	Japanese Ending	Judy Ongg	eps. 1–26

== Soundtrack ==
Cinderella (Original Soundtrack)

Soundtrack album by John Sposito
- Released: 1998
- Genre: Instrumental
- Length: 57:22
- Label: Mondo TV
- Producer: John Sposito
External audio
- Soundtrack from Official Artist on SoundCloud

Cinderella (Original Soundtrack) is consisting of 26 tracks which were used as the background music of the TV Series. The whole album is composed by John Sposito and the lyrics are written by Paola Granatelli. The theme song from the album which is titled as "Cenerentola" was sung by Erica Gaura

=== Track listing ===
No.	Title	Length
1.	"Cenerentola"	1:30
2.	"Il Carillon"	1:05
3.	"Il Sogno"	1:06
4.	"La Tristezza Di Cenerentola"	2:30
5.	"Promenade"	2:12
6.	"Le Pulizie Di Casa"	2:01
7.	"La Festa Del Paese"	1:16
8.	"Tema Cenerentola"	1:42
9.	"Il Castello Del Principe"	1:46
10.	"Il Concorso Di Bellezza"	2:55
11.	"Il Principe In Incognito"	4:44
12.	"Madame Paulette. La Fatina"	0:47
13.	"La Matrigna"	1:30
14.	"Cenerentola Innamorata"	2:20
15.	"L'Arte Di Zore Il Malvagio"	2:33
16.	"Cenerentola In Pericolo"	4:43
17.	"La Foresta Incantata"	3:35
18.	"Zaral, Il Cattivo, È Il Re!"	1:55
19.	"Zaral Sconfitto"	2:47
20.	"Cenerentola Resta A Casa"	2:12
21.	"Corri Al Ballo Del Principe"	4:00
22.	"Il Valtzer Con Il Principe"	1:33
23.	"È Mezzanotte!"	2:02
24.	"Il Ricordo Del Ballo"	1:55
25.	"La Scarpetta Di Cristallo"	0:40
26.	"Cenerentola Principessa"	2:03
Total length:		57:22

== Episodes ==
No.	Title	Original release date
1	"I Want to Become a Splendid Young Lady" "Sutekina Redi ni Naritai" (素敵なレディになりたい)	4 April 1996
Cinderella's father goes away on a long voyage, leaving his daughter in the care of her stepmother and her two stepsisters. She is banished to the attic, and then forced to do the menial chores of the household while her stepmother and stepsisters are out enjoying themselves. Luckily, Cinderella is assisted by her little animal friends: Patch, an appealing puppy, Chuchu and Bingo, two clever little mice and a little bird named Pappy.
2	"The Flowers From my Dream" "Shirotsumekusa no Yume" (シロツメクサの夢)	11 April 1996
Jeanne and Catherine, Cinderella's two stepsisters, decide to become participants in the Flower Queen contest. Cinderella follows them to the city to see their show while her pets assure her to do all the house work. She promises to return by the time her stepmother and her two stepsisters come back. While returning home she crosses paths with a young man who chases her up to the river. He returns her the key which had fallen in their encounter.
3	"The Mysterious Boy" "Akogare no Ōji-sama" (あこがれの王子さま)	18 April 1996
Cinderella and her two stepsisters, Jeanne and Catherine, go shopping in the city, and while she waits outside the shops, weighted down by the packages, she once again runs into the young man she had met the day before. The young man (prince Charles) reveals that he is the fencing partner of the Prince, which Cinderella finds hard to believe. Jeanne overhears the conversation, after which her stepmother orders her to invite him as a guest the next day.
4	"The Horse" "Sutekina Warashi no Ōji-sama" (素敵な私の王子さま)	25 April 1996
Cinderella goes out looking for Charles (who she thinks is named Alex) because her stepmother wants to talk to the prince's page. While searching she learns that Charles is not the page at all. She thinks he is just a liar and avoids him. On her way home, Cinderella's pets remind her that her stepmother has ordered to come positively with the page. As her situation worsens, Paulette, the fairy godmother, comes to the rescue using her magic to change a horse into Charles. Cinderella hurries home with the Charles, but soon after they get there, the spell wears off and the prince turns back into the horse. Scared of the horse, Cinderella's stepmother ties a carrot to the back of Cinderella's apron and sends her off running to the town with the mad horse chasing her. Charles saves her from this chaos and reveals his true name- and Cinderella tells him hers in return.
5	"A Dream Meeting" "Yume no Yōna Deai" (夢のような出会い)	2 May 1996
When they learn that the prince plans to go hunting, Cinderella's two stepsisters and her stepmother decide to have a picnic in the same woods. However, when they then arrive in the middle of the woods, a storm breaks and a sudden gust of wind blows Jeanne's hat off her head. Cinderella and Jeanne attempt to catch the hat but they fail. As Jeanne wanders about in the bushes, she is mistaken for a bear by Charles and Alex; in the nick of time, Cinderella finds Jeanne saving her from being shot as a bear. The prince realizes then that Cinderella is the same girl he met in the city.
6	"Mystery of the Vineyard" "Budō-en no Himitsu" (ぶどう園の秘密)	9 May 1996
When Cinderella's stepmother jealously sends Cinderella to the royal vineyard to pick grapes (a punishable offense) because Cinderella can dance better than both Jeanne and Catherine, the unknown thief of the royal vineyard turns out to be Charles, dressed as a page. Cinderella is caught instead, however, because Charles runs off with the grapes, and suffers a set-up for downfall by her stepmother. However, Charles hears about Cinderella's plight and confesses, thus salvaging Cinderella's reputation.
7	"False Fortuneteller" "Inchiki Uranaishi" (いんちき占い師)	16 May 1996
People became crazy for the new fortune teller, one old man who appeared in city. Cinderella's stepmother asks Cinderella to fetch the fortune teller but when the fortune teller asks for payment the stepmother gives away Cinderella's mother's doll. Cinderella goes out to find the fortune teller and ask it back but instead she discovers his secret- though he actually can see the future at times- he is only a boy who needs money. In the end the boy (Yan) gives her back her doll and they become friends. He also reads into her future and sees her in a splendid ball gown, and, though not revealing any specific details, tells her that she has the brightest future he's ever seen.
8	"The Magic of a Smile" "Mahō to Egao to Omajinai" (魔法の笑顔とおまじない)	23 May 1996
A circus is being set up at the castle. Cinderella meets a talented girl called Mary, but Mary has stage fright. While wandering through the town, Cinderella tries to think of ways to help Mary when she bumps into Charles. She takes Charles to where Mary is practicing and tells her to pretend he's Prince Charles, if she can perform in front of him then she will get over her stage fright. Charles tells her about a special ritual the prince does when he gets nervous, Mary does this too, and performs with success.
9	"There's Something Strange About That Boy" "Ki ni naru Aitsu" (気になるあいつ)	30 May 1996
Cinderella is told to go pick some roses in the forest. Prince Charles learns that two of his teachers have been replaced because they were sick and old; Alex then finds out that their tutor was fired. Charles chases Zaral out of the palace because he suspects something. Cinderella sees that Charles is chasing Zaral and decides to follow. Zaral tells his henchman to go capture Charles, Cinderella pushes a big rock off the cliff and is captured instead. She hears Zaral talking about his evil plot to overrun the king. Charles then comes to her rescue just in time.
10	"Sad Violinist" "Kanashiki Baiorin" (悲しきバイオリン)	6 June 1996
When Duke Zaral's daughter hosts a ball, Prince Charles will do just about anything to get out of it. So he has Alex dress as himself and go to the ball in a mask- claiming he thought it was going to be a masquerade ball. Meanwhile, Cinderella leaves the waiting coach (her step family is attending the ball, of course) and goes to the gardens to watch. While there, Cinderella meets Nicholas, a violinist in love with a noble's daughter, Lora Pennington. Despite their love for each other, Nicholas and Lora are forbidden by her parents to be married because he is a commoner and they have hopes of marrying their daughter to Prince Charles. This is why the violinist's music is so sad. Charles and Cinderella talk a bit about this when they see each other in the gardens and both agree that things like wealth and nobility shouldn't dictate who you marry. They also both agree that in the end, true love can conquer over any obstacle.
11	"For a Fantastic Love Story" "Sutekina Koi o Shite Mitai" (素敵な恋をしてみたい)	13 June 1996
Cinderella, Charles and the Fortune Teller Yan decide to help Nicholas and Lora be together. Unknown to them, Paulette is also interested in helping them.
12	"Pleased to Meet You, Prince" "Ōji-sama Hajimemashite!" (王子さま はじめまして!)	20 June 1996
The King and Queen decide to throw a ball in order to help Charles find a Fiance. Prince Charles wants nothing to do with it. Cinderella and her family are all invited, but Cinderella's Stepmother has refused to let her go. Cinderella's animal friends make her a dress, and she sneaks in with the vegetables. Meanwhile, Zarel threatens to tell the King and Queen about Charles' adventures in disguise outside of the castle if he refuses to marry his daughter Isabel. After hearing a talk between Charles and Alex, Cinderella angrily yells at them about doing an arranged marriage without love, which then her animal friends help stop the ball. Charles then decides to do a marriage with love.
13	"The Way of Love... Isabel Runs Away" "Ai no Yukue...Kieta Izaberu" (愛の行方...消えたイザベル)	27 June 1996
Isabel grows frustrated with Prince Charles' uninterest in her. In attempt to gain his attention, she runs away from home. Isabel soon finds herself in more trouble than she can handle, taking Cinderella with her. It is up to Charles and Cinderella's animal friends to save them from trouble.
14	"Prince Charles's Secret" "Sharuru Ōji no Himitsu" (シャルル王子の秘密)	4 July 1996
In an attempt to learn secrets about Prince Charles, Zarel invites Cinerella's sisters to live at the castle for a "vacation". However instead of relaxing, they are instructed to clean the castle! How will Jean and Catherine deal with their new chores? Will they get to meet the Prince?
15	"Two Charles" "Futari no Sharuru Ōji" (二人のシャルル王子)	11 July 1996
When Cinderella and her family are in town, they see the Prince in his carriage. Charles, who later meets up with Cinderella, is adamant that the boy in the carriage isn't the prince and seeks to find the truth. The false prince is really Yan's missing friend Marcel, who is fooled into a scheme by Zarel to replace the Prince with an imposter.
16	"The Prince and House Work" "Otetsudai wa Oji-sama" (お手伝いは王子さま)	18 July 1996
When Cinderella suddenly falls ill from overwork, Charles brings a doctor and assures him that he'll see to it that she gets some rest. While taking over her chores the prince gets an appreciation for hard work and at the end of the episode decides to accept his royal obligations and devotes himself more seriously to his studies. Also during this adventure, Duke Zarel pays a visit to Cinderella's step family, who are having Charles cook them dinner. Having tasted the soup after hearing Jeanne and Katherine claim to have made it themselves, the duke is offended by the disgusting concoction and leaves- unwilling to use them in his plot any longer.
17	"Kindness of a Small Heart" "Chīsana Kokoro ni Yasashī Kimochi" (小さな心に優しい気持ち)	25 July 1996
Jeanne and Catherine lose their mother's priceless mint pearl ring, and Cinderella takes the blame. She has until Sunset to find it, or be kicked out of her home. While searching, Cinderella falls from a cliff, and in an attempt to save her, Paulette changes her to the size of a mouse! Now only a few inches tall, Cinderella continues her search with the help of her animal friends. Will she be able to find it before the sun goes down?
18	"Disturbing Painter" "Bukimina Ekaki" (不気味な絵描き)	1 August 1996
Zarel takes Prince Charles to the painter Zore to have his portrait done. At the same time, Catherine and Jeanne refuse to have their portraits done by anyone but by the best. Cinderella goes in search of her mother's favorite painter, Zore. While Zore refuses to paint her sisters without 100 gold pieces, he demands to paint Cinderella. As he paints, he uses the dark arts to slowly take her soul. Cinderella grows weaker. With the help of Patch, Cinderella escapes. But Charles is still in danger. To protect prince Charles, who Cinderella does not know is her friend Charles, she begs Zore to continue her portrait before his. Patch and the animal friends help rescue Charles, and in turn Charles gains back his souls and strength to try and rescue an unresponsive Cinderella. Before Cinderella's soul is trapped forever, Paulette the fairy godmother uses her magical to defeat the painter.
19	"Let's Get Rid of Those Bandits" "Tōzoku-dan o Yattsukero" (盗賊団をやっつけろ)	8 August 1996
Cinderella's Stepmother begins to spread rumors around town that her two daughters, Catherine and Jeanne, are candidates for marriage with Prince Charles, using her connection with Duke Zarel as evidence. Zarel decided to teach them a lesson by sending thugs to their house to rob them. Cinderella becomes determined to protect her own home. Charles becomes involved when a desperate Cinderella asks him to teach her to fight with a sword for self defense. Though hesitant at first, and then teasing, he realizes that Cinderella is serious about the threat. Not only does he teach her but also helps guard the house, until his duties at the castle can not be ignored. Meisha also learns to talk.
20	"Traveling Towards Happiness" "Shiawase e no Tabidachi" (幸せへの旅立ち)	15 August 1996
Cinderella's Father arranges a marriage for Catherine, but when Cinderella's Stepmother finds out, she sets him up with Cinderella instead. Luckily, it turns out that he is Isabel's childhood friend, and he still wants to marry her. With the helps of her friends, Cinderella is able to set up an engagement for the two nobles.
21	"Memories of My Mother" "Okāsama no Omoide" (お母さまの思い出)	22 August 1996
Cinderella's Stepmother becomes sick, and the only way to cure her is to get a medicinal herb from the haunted forest. Cinderella, Patch, and Paulette travel to the forest to get the herb, and Paulette tells Cinderella how she met Cinderella's mother, Cinderella proves herself to be pure and her mother is proud for who she sees. Cinderella gives the medicine to the stepmother who is more kinder to nature now to Cinderella's stepsisters' confusion.
22	"Cinderella is in Danger" "Shindarera Kiki~ippatsu" (シンデレラ危機一髪)	29 August 1996
Charles and Cinderella explore an old house only to discover a collection of weapons stolen from the royal family and a gang who are loyal to Zarel.
23	"Eliminate the Prince" "Nerawa reta Ōji-sama" (狙われた王子さま)	5 September 1996
Duke Zarel unleashes his plot to overthrow the Royal Family. Prince Charles is chased, and life threatened. Duke Zarel's men mistakenly kidnap Marcel, who is dressed up as the prince for Cinderella's family's costume party. Cinderella learns that Charles the Fibber is really Prince Charles.
24	"Invitation to the Ball" "Budōkai e no Jōtaijō" (舞踏会への招待状)	12 September 1996
The King and Queen are impressed with Prince Charles' behavior to stop Duke Zarel. Deciding that he is ready to take the throne, they throw him a ball in hopes of him finding a fiance. Cinderella is invited with her two stepsisters and her stepmother, and while she's working on her two stepsisters and her stepmother's clothing, she still manages to pull out her deceased mother's favorite dress and get ready for the ball. However, when she comes down to leave, Cinderella's two Stepsisters and Cinderella's Stepmother laugh at her, calling her dress out of date and her hair unstylish. Refusing to be seen at the ball with her, they tear her invitation. After hoping for so long to see Charles again and wish him the best of luck with his royal duties, Cinderella is crushed. Paulette, Cinderella's Fairy Godmother, comes to Cinderella and updates her clothing, does her hair, and sends Cinderella off in a magic carriage with her animal friends as her footman. At the ball, Cinderella dances with Prince Charles, who doesn't recognize her. Cinderella leaves the ball at the stroke of midnight in a rush, leaving her glass slipper behind her.
25	"Shoe of Happiness" "Shiawase o Yobu Kutsu" (幸せを呼ぶ靴)	26 September 1996
Charles can't stop looking at Cinderella's Glass Slipper. The King and Queen begin looking for the mysterious girl from the ball. Not finding her name in the Invitation's list, They begin to become desperate and take the Glass Slipper to every house in the Emerald Kingdom. When Cinderella hears about the Prince, she becomes depressed because she believes that the prince won't want anything to do with her because of her station. When Alex comes to Cinderella's home with the Glass Slipper, Cinderella is banished to her room. When Jeanne and Catherine's feet don't fit into the shoe, Alex insists that all young ladies try on the slipper. Cinderella is brought downstairs, but she refuses to try on the shoe until Patch brings the other shoe to them and Miss Paulette uses her magic to make her, to her stepfamily's shock and dismay that she is a princess.
26	"A Happy Marriage" "Shiawasena Kekkonshiki" (幸せな結婚式)	3 October 1996
Cinderella is introduced to Prince Charles as the girl from the ball, and Prince Charles is overjoyed to find that the girl from the ball is Cinderella. He invites her to stay. Cinderella moves into the castle with her animal friends. Her stepsisters and stepmother make peace with her, and are invited to her wedding to their delight; and finally learning how to do something besides around being spoiled, and their dad comes home to the family which is back together again. However, Duke Zarel and his men sneak into the castle with the wedding party, seemingly poison Prince Charles, and kidnap Cinderella. Zarel takes Cinderella as hostage and threatens to push her off the castle wall if the King refuses to give Zarel the throne. At the Last moment, Prince Charles comes in, declaring that he never drank the poison. Prince Charles chases Zarel to the top of the Castle Tower and fights Zarel, who pushes Cinderella off the tower. Cinderella holds on to the edge of the tower for dear life. Zarel takes a swing at her with his sword, Cinderella losing her grip just at the moment his sword is about to hit her and Zarel's sword hits the stone. Cinderella Falls, and Prince Charles catches her. When Zarel's sword hit the stone, pieces of the stone hit him in the eyes, causing him to be unable to see. He stumbles off the clock tower and falls to his death. A Happy Marriage ends with Prince Charles being crowned King and Cinderella being crowned Queen with all her family and friends in attendance.
