= The Legend of Zorro (anime series) =

Japanese anime television series

- Promotional poster for the television series Kaiketsu Zorro

快傑ゾロ (Extraordinary Zorro)
- Genre: Historical, adventure, superhero
- Anime television series
- Directed by: Katsumi Minoguchi
- Produced by: Hiroshi Kato; Masako Fukuyo; Tatsuo Oba
- Written by: Sukehiro Tomita
- Music by: Hiromoto Tobisawa
- Studio: Ashi Productions
- Original network: NHK
- English network: AU: Nine Network, 9Go!
- Original run: April 5, 1996 – March 28, 1997
- Episodes: 52

The Legend of Zorro (Japanese: 快傑ゾロ, Hepburn: Kaiketsu Zoro; lit. "Extraordinary Zorro") is a Japanese anime series produced by Ashi Productions and Toho, based on Johnston McCulley's popular character Zorro. The series was initially broadcast in Italy in 1994 before being broadcast in Japan two years later, albeit with some episodes skipped (only 46 of the original 52 episodes were shown in Japan).

== Plot ==
Diego Vega, the eighteen-year-old scion of a local landowner, returns from studying in Spain and discovers that his homeland has fallen under the dictatorship of Commander Raymond and Lieutenant Gabriel. Outraged by the oppression, Diego decides to fight the tyrants. Disguised as Zorro, a masked swordsman, he helps the weak, riding away on his horse, Viento.

In his day-to-day life, Diego portrays himself as a clumsy and cowardly boy who flees when faced with dangerous situations only to appear moments later as Zorro. As the local hero, he is known to punish his enemies by cutting a Z-shaped mark into them with the tip of his blade. Diego is accompanied by Bernard, his sidekick, who wears a similar costume and has the nickname "Little Zorro."

Diego's childhood friend and sweetheart, Lolita Prideaux, believes that Spain changed him and she scolds him relentlessly for his idiotic behavior. Lolita is a sweet-tempered girl who wants to fight evil and protect the people by helping Zorro from behind the scenes. She later develops feelings for Zorro, though she is unaware of his true identity.

== Characters ==
Don Diego Vega/Zorro
Voiced by: Toshihiko Seki
The main protagonist of the series. As Diego, he pretends to be lazy and clumsy, playing the role of a cowardly fool to hide his secret identity. As Zorro, he is the most noble-minded swordsman in the world. Diego is a rival of Captain Raymond but feels a deep affection for the other man. Diego is calm and reasonable, contrasting with his hot-headed and stubborn companions.
Lolita Prideaux
Voiced by: Maria Kawamura
The female protagonist of the series. Diego's spunky and beautiful, blond childhood friend and love interest. She acts bossy towards Diego, but she has romantic feelings for Zorro.
Bernard/Little Zorro
Voiced by: Rica Matsumoto
Diego/Zorro's sidekick, an abandoned orphan found by Diego when he was still a baby. Diego adopted and took care of him as if he was his younger brother. He helps Zorro by eavesdropping and gathering information, and later develops his own alter ego, "Little Zorro."
Commander Raymond
Voiced by: Jūrōta Kosugi
The main villain of the series, commander of the Spanish Army in California who plots to assassinate the Governor-General.
Lieutenant Gabriel
Voiced by: Kenyuu Horiuchi
A young Spanish officer who serves as Captain Raymond's right-hand man in California. Lt. Gabriel has feelings for Lolita.
Don Alejandro Vega
Voiced by: Ikuya Sawaki
Diego's father. Wealthy landowner and field worker.
Sergeant Pedro Gonzales
Voiced by: Kōzō Shioya
A stout sergeant who often serves as comic relief. Comparable to Johnston McCulley's character from 1920's The Mark of Zorro. He has a good moral sense but remains gluttonous and simple-minded within the army.
Don Carlos Prideaux
Lolita's father.
Catarina Prideaux
Lolita's mother.
Maria
The Vega's housemaid. She is very masculine, boisterous, and not afraid to scold - but takes care of the kids with much fondness.
Viento
Zorro's horse.
Tackle
Diego's lazy hunting dog.
Figaro
Bernard's helpful bulldog.
Nikita
Bernard's love interest.
Manuel
One of Bernard's best friends.
Sergio
One of Bernard's best friends.
Leona
One of Bernard's best friends, a girl who looks like a boy.
Governor-General
In charge of the Californian branch of the army (and town by extension).
Captain Jekyll
Brown
Kapital

== Episode list ==
=== The Legend of Zorro (1996) ===
No.	Title
1	"Return of the Hero"
-
2	"The Barrels of Wine"
-
3	"Proposal of Marriage"
-
4	"Wake Up My Friend!"
-
5	"The Ties of Blood"
-
6	"The Red Jewel"
-
7	"Too Many Zorros"
-
8	"Killer Guitar"
-
9	"The Treasure of Dreams"
-
10	"Untrue Feelings"
-
11	"Mystery Mountain"
-
12	"Man's Best Friend"
-
13	"Little Zorro at Full Blast"
-
14	"The Stagecoach Is in Danger!"
-
15	"Lolita's Kiss"
-
16	"The Sword from Japan"
-
17	"Cornered"
-
18	"The Clever Detective"
-
19	"A House of Deadly Tricks"
-
20	"Vengeance"
-
21	"Wings of Dreams"
-
22	"Gonzales the Thief"
-
23	"The Bride from Spain"
-
24	"The People's Enemy"
-
25	"Tears of Clown"
-
26	"Pepita"
-
27	"Lady Barbara"
-
28	"The Haunted Ruins"
-
29	"The Great Art Swindle"
-
30	"Gonzales in Love"
-
31	"Fire in the Sky"
-
32	"A Doctor's Dilemma"
-
33	"Lolita in Love"
-
34	"The Order to Kill Zorro"
-
35	"Gonzales in Love Again"
-
36	"Unmasked"
-
37	"Diego Under Cover"
-
38	"The Underwater Adventure"
-
39	"The Battle in the Storm"
-
40	"My Fair Lady Zorro"
-
41	"Lolita Get Your Gun!"
-
42	"Trapped by Ninja Magic"
-
43	"Beauty and the Monster"
-
44	"Gabriel's Rebellion"
-
45	"The Legend of the Sacred Wood"
-
46	"The Hipnotic Doctor"
-
47	"The Kidnapping of the Governor-General"
-
48	"A Righteous Military Officer"
-
49	"Farewell to the Army"
-
50	"Blast Off the Demonic Cannon"
-
51	"A Prelude to the Collapse"
-
52	"The Sword of Justice Forever"
-

== Music ==
The series soundtrack contains two pieces of thematic music. The opening theme is titled "Zorro", and the closing theme "Chikai" (誓い; "Oath"). Both are sung by Masaaki Endoh and are used for all aired episodes.
