= List of programs broadcast by Spacetoon =

Spacetoon is an international TV network. This is a list of television programs broadcast by Spacetoon around the world.

== Spacetoon Arabic ==
=== Current and former programming ===
- 10+2 (7 August 2003 – 30 March 2019; 2020) (Bon Bon)
- 44 Cats (1 December 2024 – present) (Comedy)
- Ace Ventura: Pet Detective (2000–2013) (Comedy)
- Action Man (2000–2014) (Action)
- Adventures From The Book of Virtues (10 April – 3 November 2006) (Adventure)
- The Adventures of Little Penguin (2024–present) (Comedy)
- The Adventures of Paddington (2023–present) (Adventure)
- The Adventures of Reggie Rabbit (Movies)
- The Adventures of Sam & Max: Freelance Police (5 January 2006 – 2009) (Adventure)
- Adventures of Sonic the Hedgehog (23 July 2000 – 31 January 2015) (Adventure then Comedy from 2013 onwards)
- The Adventures of Tom Sawyer (2015–2019) (Adventure)
- Aesop World (30 June 2004 – 31 May 2020) (Bon Bon)
- Akakage (Action)
- Akubi-chan (2 May 2006 – 8 October 2017) (Zomoroda)
- ALF: The Animated Series (27 June 2003 – 18 December 2013) (Adventure)
- The All-New Dennis the Menace (24 June 2000 – 2013) (Comedy)
- The All New Popeye Hour (2000 – 22 February 2012) (Adventure)
- Alpen Rose (2000–2018) (Zomoroda)
- Alvinnn!!! and the Chipmunks (2016–2020; 2025) (Comedy)
- Anatole (30 June 2004 – 2014) (Bon Bon)
- Andy Pandy (10 February 2007 – 30 July 2018) (Bon Bon)
- Animaniacs (1 August 2001 – 14 December 2011) (Comedy)
- Animated Hero Classics (10 April – 3 November 2006) (History)
- Anyamaru Tantei Kiruminzuu (2013–present) (Zomoroda)
- Aoki Densetsu Shoot! (2000 – 31 October 2013) (Sports)
- Arabian Nights: Sinbad's Adventures (2000–2014) (Adventure)
- Argai: The Prophecy (2003–2013) (Action)
- Ashita he Free Kick (2000 – 31 October 2013) (Sports)
- Attack of Captain Constant (2000 – 31 October 2013) (Sports)
- B-Daman Crossfire (2014–present) (Action)
- Babar (25 July 2000 – 23 February 2015) (Bon Bon)
- Babar and the Adventures of Badou (2015–2019) (Bon Bon)
- Baby & Me (5 June 2000 – 25 December 2016; 2024–present) (Adventure then Spacetoon Treasures block in 2024)
- Baby Looney Tunes (15 February 2006 – 18 March 2011) (Comedy)
- Bakugan Battle Brawlers (2009–present) (Action)
- Bakusō Kyōdai Let's & Go!! (2002 – 31 October 2013) (Sports)
- Bakusō Kyōdai Let's & Go!! Max (2009 – 31 October 2013) (Sports)
- Barbie Dreamtopia (30 November 2020 – present) (Zomoroda)
- Barney & Friends (3 April 2000 – 1 January 2011) (Abjad)
- Bartok the Magnificent (Movies)
- Batman: The Animated Series (15 July 2000 – 31 January 2013) (Action)
- Bajillionaires (2026–present) (Science)
- Be-Be-Bears: Bjorn and Bucky (6 September 2020 – present) (Adventure)
- Beep Boop (2025–present) (Comedy)
- Ben 10 (8 June – 18 December 2008) (Action)
- Best Furry Friends (2023–present) (Zomoroda)
- Beyblade (14 March 2004 – 21 October 2016) (Sports)
- Beyblade Burst (10 December 2018 – January 2025; 2 February 2025 – present) (Sports)
- Beyblade X (14 April 2025 – present) (Sports)
- Bi-Legend Battle Bidaman (2007–2010) (Action)
- Biker Mice from Mars (2006) (2008) (Action)
- Birdz (15 June 2003 – 16 November 2013) (Comedy)
- The Black Corsair (2003–2008) (Adventure)
- Blazing Dragons (11 June 2001 – 18 March 2014) (Comedy)
- Blazing Team: Masters of Yo Kwon Do (17 November 2019 – present) (Action)
- Blazing Teens (18 February 2008 – 12 November 2013) (Action)
- Blippi Visits (2026–present) (Abjad)
- Blippi Wonders (2022–present) (Spacetoon Mum block then Abjad from 2025 onwards)
- Bluey (15 March 2024 – present) (Abjad then Adventure from January 2025 onwards)
- Bob the Builder (2016–2021) (Bon Bon)
- Bob the Builder: Mega Machines – The Movie (22 January 2021) (Movies)
- Bob the Builder: Ready, Steady, Build! (Bon Bon)
- Bomberman B-Daman Bakugaiden (2001–2005) (Action)
- Bruno the Kid (11 September 2000 – 10 May 2008) (Adventure)
- Bubu and the Little Owls (Unknown)
- Bump in the Night (15 May 2004 – 25 September 2014) (Comedy)
- Burst Ball Barrage!! Super B-Daman (2006–2007) (Action)
- Camp Candy (15 June 2002 – 10 May 2014) (Adventure)
- Canimals (20 July – 20 October 2012) (Adventure)
- Captain Power and the Soldiers of the Future (2001 – 31 October 2014) (Action)
- Captain Simian & the Space Monkeys (2001–2003) (Action)
- Captain Tsubasa (27 March 2000 – 27 September 2016) (Sports)
- The Care Bears Family (30 March 2004 – 29 March 2014) (Bon Bon)
- Cartooning with Blitz (15 June 2001 – 28 October 2014) (Abjad)
- Casper's Scare School (25 October 2011 – 31 March 2015) (Comedy)
- Charley and Mimmo (29 March 2005 – 6 September 2017; 2019) (Bon Bon)
- Chibi Maruko-chan (2026–present) (Zomoroda)
- China Wings (2003–2005) (Action)
- Chop Chop Ninja (22 March 2022) (Comedy)
- Christopher Columbus (2000–2005) (History)
- Chouseishin Gransazer (2006–2012) (Action)
- Clamp School Detectives (2007–2014) (Adventure)
- Cocomelon (14 May 2019 – present) (Spacetoon Mum block then Bon Bon from 2025 onwards)
- Codename: Kids Next Door (13 March 2009 – 12 March 2010) (Comedy)
- Combo Niños (2011–2017) (Action)
- Cookin' Idol I! My! Mine! (8 June 2014 – 2017) (Zomoroda)
- Cook and Sheep (3 March 2013 – 5 April 2015; 6 October 2017 – 2018) (Comedy)
- Crash B-Daman (2010–present) (Action)
- Cry Babies Magic Tears (2024–present) (Zomoroda)
- Cyborg Kuro-chan (29 January 2006 – 29 September 2020) (Adventure)
- Daniel Tiger's Neighborhood (Spacetoon Mum block then Bon Bon from 2025 onwards)
- Dash! Yonkuro (2000–2013) (Sports)
- Delfy and His Friends (Adventure)
- Dennō Bōkenki Webdiver (2005–2016) (Action)
- Detective Conan (31 March 2000 – present) (Action)
- Dexter's Laboratory (23 July 2004 – 11 April 2008) (Comedy)
- D.I.C.E. (22 January 2006 – 1 September 2020) (Action)
- Dig & Dug with Daisy (4 August 2001 – 31 July 2019, 2020) (Bon Bon)
- Digimon Adventure (15 April 2001 – 30 September 2014) (Action)
- Digimon Adventure (2020 TV series) (2 June 2024 – present) (Action)
- Digimon Adventure 02 (15 April 2002 – 30 September 2014) (Action)
- Digimon Frontier (15 April 2004 – 30 September 2014) (Action)
- Digimon Tamers (15 April 2003 – 30 September 2014) (Action)
- Dog of Flanders (Movies)
- Doraemon (1979) (21 August 2000 – 20 June 2008) (Bon Bon)
- Doraemon (2005) (7 March 2016 – 2022; 2025 – present) (Comedy)
- Double Dragon (2000–2011) (Action)
- Dragon Ball (28 January 2002 – 23 November 2008) (Action)
- Dragon Ball Super (15 March 2020 – present) (Action)
- Dragon Ball Z (2003 – 24 March 2013) (Action)
- Dragon Ball Z Kai (2015–2020) (Action)
- Dragon Booster (12 January 2005 – 2020) (Action)
- Dragon Quest: The Adventure of Dai (1991) (31 March 2000 – 24 July 2007; August 2020) (Action)
- Dragon Quest: The Adventure of Dai (2020) (Action)
- Droopy, Master Detective (2000–2004) (Comedy)
- Dumb and Dumber (Comedy)
- Edebits (Adventure)
- Emily of New Moon (2010–2016) (Zomoroda)
- Enchantimals: Finding Home (23 April 2021) (Movies)
- Enchantimals: Tales from Everwilde (Season 1: 7 September 2020 – 3 April 2021; 1 June – 6 July 2021) (Season 2: 19 September 2021 – 2022) (Zomoroda)
- Enchantimals: Secrets of Snowy Valley (13 May 2021) (Movies)
- Enchantimals: Spring Into Harvest Hills (18 June 2021) (Movies)
- Everything's Rosie (2015–2018) (Adventure)
- Exosquad (Action)
- F (20 January 2009 – 2017) (Action)
- Fabulous Funnies (31 March 2000 – 26 October 2013) (Comedy)
- The Fairly OddParents (2016–2019) (Comedy)
- The Fantastic Voyages of Sinbad the Sailor (2001–2012) (Adventure)
- Fifi and the Flowertots (8 July 2006 – 16 December 2016) (Zomoroda)
- Fimbles (1 April 2005 – 31 March 2015) (Abjad)
- Fireman Sam (2016–2019) (Bon Bon)
- Fireman Sam: Alien Alert! The Movie (11 December 2020) (Movies)
- First Flight (Movies)
- The Fixies (12 September 2016 – 17 October 2019) (Science)
- The Flintstones (13 June 2000 – 18 October 2014) (Comedy)
- Floral Magician Mary Bell (2000–2013) (Zomoroda)
- Foofur (2000 – 8 September 2014) (Comedy then Adventure)
- Franklin (10 May 2003 – 26 February 2015) (Bon Bon)
- Franklin and Friends (2015–2018) (Bon Bon)
- Frutillita (Zomoroda)
- Futurama (7 February – 26 October 2011) (Comedy)
- Future Boy Conan (1 September 2000 – 21 February 2015) (History then Adventure in 2013)
- Garfield and Friends (Garfield segments only) (24 June 2007 – 4 April 2015) (Adventure)
- Garfield Gets Real (Movies)
- Gekito! Crush Gear Turbo (12 January 2005 – 18 December 2013) (Sports)
- George and Martha (22 March 2005 – 30 May 2020) (Bon Bon)
- Ginga Sengoku Gun'yūden Rai (2000–2013) (Action)
- Go Astro Boy Go! (2025–present) (Adventure)
- Golden Warrior Gold Lightan (2006–2015) (Action)
- Gormiti: The Lords Of Nature Return! (2011–2014) (Action)
- Gormiti (2019–2021) (Action)
- Gormiti: The New Era (2025–present) (Action)
- Grander Musashi (2003 – 24 September 2017) (Adventure)
- Granesizer (2006–2012) (Action)
- The Great Adventures of Robin Hood (3 June 2000 – 1 March 2015) (History then Adventure in 2013)
- The Great Book of Nature (18 March 2003 – 14 May 2008) (Adventure)
- Grimm's Fairy Tale Classics (2000 – 21 December 2016) (Movies then Adventure in 2013)
- Grendizer (2015–2017) (Action)
- Goomer (2005–2009) (Comedy)
- Hamtaro (8 January 2004 – 18 December 2022) (Zomoroda)
- Hanakappa (8 April 2018 – 2022) (Bon Bon)
- Happy Ness: Secret of the Loch (31 March 2001 – 10 May 2008) (Adventure)
- Hassan and His Brothers (2025–present) (Adventure)
- Helen the Baby Fox (Movies)
- Hello Kitty & Friends: Let's Learn Together (2020) (Zomoroda)
- Hello Kitty: Ringo no Mori (Zomoroda)
- Hello Kitty's Paradise (2000–2010) (Bon Bon then Zomoroda)
- Hello! Sandybell (2000 – 23 February 2015) (Zomoroda)
- Herohero-kun (Bon Bon)
- Heroes of the City (2014–2017) (Bon Bon)
- Hikarian (2002–2014) (Action)
- Honō no Tōkyūji: Dodge Danpei (2000 – 26 September 2016) (Sports)
- Horseland (15 September 2006 – 30 September 2017; 11 March – 6 June 2019) (Zomoroda)
- Horton Hears a Who! (2017) (Movies)
- The Hot Rod Dogs and Cool Car Cats (2001) (Adventure)
- Hoyt'n Andy's Sportsbender (2003–2004) (Sports)
- Hurricanes (28 April 2002 – 16 June 2007) (Sports)
- Hunter × Hunter (1 September 2003 – 2020) (Adventure)
- Hypernauts (2005–2009) (Adventure)
- Hyper Rescue Drive Head (27 October 2025 – present) (Action)
- Ice Age: Continental Drift (2017–2019) (Movies)
- Ice Age: The Meltdown (Movies)
- Idaten Jump (15 June 2008 – 21 March 2015) (Sports)
- Idol Densetsu Eriko (15 January 2006 – 29 May 2014) (Zomoroda)
- Iftah Ya Simsim (4 September 2015 – 24 October 2019) (Abjad)
- Ikkyū-san (2000–2013) (Adventure)
- Inazuma Eleven (10 June 2010 – present) (Sports)
- Information City (30 March 2004 – 6 March 2017; 2019) (Science then Abjad in 2019)
- Inspector Fabre (2005 – 31 October 2013) (Adventure)
- Inspector Gadget's Field Trip (6 August 2003 – 30 April 2017) (Science)
- Inuyasha (21 November 2014 – 2020) (Adventure)
- Ironfist Chinmi (15 March 2000 – 31 December 2020) (Sports)
- Iron Kid (4 June 2007 – 29 April 2026) (Action)
- Jankenman (2005–2020) (Bon Bon)
- Jewelpet Twinkle (3 March 2013 – present) (Zomoroda)
- Jewelpet (1 May 2011 – present) (Zomoroda)
- Jim Henson's Animal Show (3 April 2000 – 2013) (Abjad)
- Jungle Book Shōnen Mowgli (2000 – 31 March 2015) (Adventure)
- The Jungle King (Movies)
- Justice League (2004–2012) (Action)
- Kamen Rider: Dragon Knight (2013–2017) (Action)
- Kamen Rider Ryuki (2007–2012) (Action)
- Kamisama Minarai: Himitsu no Cocotama (2017–2020; 9 March 2025) (Zomoroda)
- Katuri (Bon Bon)
- Keroro Gunsō (2010–2017) (Adventure)
- The Kidsongs Television Show (2 March 2005 – 17 February 2017; 2019) (Abjad)
- Kitty Cats (Abjad)
- Kids Diana Show Ultimate Mishmash (22 March 2021 – present) (Zomoroda)
- Kipper (Bon Bon)
- Kiteretsu Daihyakka (31 May 2003 – 10 March 2017; 14 April 2024 – present) (Science then Adventure from 3 March – 31 August 2013 then Science from 1 September 2013 onwards)
- Kira Kira Happy Hirake! Cocotama (17 November 2025 – present) (Zomoroda)
- Kon'nichiwa Anne: Before Green Gables (2025–present) (Zomoroda)
- Knowledge Quest (21 June 2000 – 14 June 2014) (Science)
- Krypto the Superdog (10 February 2007 – 29 December 2011) (Adventure)
- Kukuli (2022–present) (Spacetoon Mum block then Bon Bon from 2025 onwards)
- Kuroko's Basketball (2021–present) (Sports)
- Kuroko's Basketball The Movie: Last Game (Movies)
- Kuroko's Basketball: Winter Cup Compilation (Movies)
- The Land Before Time (Movies)
- The Land Before Time II: The Great Valley Adventure (Movies)
- The Legend of the North Wind (2000–2013) (Adventure)
- The Legend of Snow White (2000–2014) (Zomoroda)
- The Legend of Zorro (2000–2011) (Action)
- Les Misérables: Shōjo Cosette (Adventure)
- Let's Go Pocoyo (10 September 2018) (Abjad)
- Liberty's Kids (3 February 2005 – 23 July 2018) (History then Adventure in 2013)
- Life by the Numbers (17 June 2001 – 10 June 2017) (Science)
- Little Angel (Spacetoon Mum block then Bon Bon from 2025 onwards)
- Little Battlers Experience (2014–2017) (Action)
- Little Battlers eXperience W (2025–present) (Action)
- Little Bear (2000–2014) (Bon Bon)
- Little Charmers (Zomoroda)
- Little Clowns of Happytown (1 September 2004 – 31 August 2014) (Adventure then Bon Bon from late 2004 onwards)
- Little Miss (English dubbed, Arabic subtitles) (2015–2017) (Comedy)
- Little Monsters (7 August 2002 – 22 May 2014) (Bon Bon)
- Little People (6 September 2020 – present) (Bon Bon)
- Little Robots (2007–2008) (Adventure)
- Little Rosey (8 January 2004 – 16 November 2017) (Zomoroda)
- Little Women II: Jo's Boys (18 February 2008 – 19 October 2017; 2020 (reruns)) (Zomoroda)
- Littlest Pet Shop Shorts (6 September – 28 November 2020) (Zomoroda)
- Littlest Pet Shop: A World of Our Own (7 December 2020 – present) (Zomoroda)
- Looney Tunes (12 March 2001 – 18 November 2011) (Comedy)
- The Lost Universe (2004–2013) (Adventure)
- Machine Robo Rescue (2010–present) (Action)
- Macross (Action)
- Madeline (12 March 2002 – 21 August 2018) (Zomoroda)
- The Magic School Bus (21 April 2000 – 25 December 2013) (Abjad)
- The Magic School Bus Rides Again (27 March 2022 – 21 January 2025) (Science)
- Magical Princess Minky Momo (2000–2023) (Zomoroda)
- Make Way for Noddy (31 May 2003 – 8 August 2016) (Bon Bon)
- Mama is a 4th Grader (8 January 2004 – 24 December 2016) (Zomoroda)
- Maroons (January 2006 – December 2012) (Bon Bon then Action)
- The Marshmallow Times (16 July 2007 – 29 April 2026) (Zomoroda)
- Marvi Hämmer (19 January 2005 – 10 June 2017) (Science)
- Masha and the Bear (2015–present) (Zomoroda)
- Masha's Spooky Stories (6 September 2020 – 7 November 2026) (Zomoroda)
- Masha's Tales (2015–2020) (Zomoroda)
- The Mask (15 March 2000 – 21 October 2014) (Comedy)
- The Masked Cycler (Action)
- Mazica Party (2026–present) (Action)
- Merrie Melodies (12 March 2001 – 18 November 2011) (Comedy)
- Mewkledreamy (October 2024 – present) (Zomoroda)
- Mia the Mouse (2015–present) (Abjad)
- Mickey Mouse (2009–2010) (Comedy)
- Mickey Mouse Clubhouse (2007) (Adventure)
- Midori no Makibaō (18 January 2003 – 23 November 2013) (Comedy)
- Mike the Knight (2015–2019) (Adventure)
- Mobile Suit Gundam Wing (2003 – 31 October 2013) (Action)
- Moero!! Robocon (14 March 2004 – 18 November 2016) (Adventure)
- The Mojicons (2017–2020) (Adventure)
- Molang (2018–present) (Comedy)
- Monster Hunter Stories: Ride On (7 September 2020 – present) (Action)
- Monster Jam (Sports)
- Monster Rancher (2003 – 12 September 2014) (Action)
- Monsuno (2013) (Action)
- Moonzy (2019–2022) (Abjad then Bon Bon from 2020 onwards)
- Mortal Kombat: Defenders of the Realm (2000–2012) (Action)
- The Moshaya Family (4 January 2021 – present) (Adventure)
- The Mr. Men Show (17 August 2015 – 2017) (UK English dub with Arabic subtitles); (Season 1: 20 September 2020 – 7 September 2021; 13 February 2022 – 2023) (Arabic dub) (Comedy)
- ¡Mucha Lucha! (16 July 2004 – 11 January 2013) (Comedy)
- Muka Muka Paradise (2000 – 31 May 2020) (Bon Bon)
- My Favorite Martians (24 July 2000 – 19 May 2014) (Comedy)
- My Little Pony: Equestria Girls (Zomoroda)
- My Little Pony: Friendship Is Magic (8 June 2014 – 2023; formerly aired on Cartoon Network Arabic) (Zomoroda)
- My Little Pony: Pony Life (22 March 2021 – present) (Zomoroda)
- My Long Legged Dad (2003) (Zomoroda)
- Nadia: The Secret of Blue Water (2000–2013) (Adventure)
- Naruto (25 August 2007 – 2020) (Action)
- Naruto SD (4 April 2015 – 17 October 2019) (Comedy) (first 25 episodes only, new episodes on Yemen TV)
- The New Adventures of Flash Gordon (Action)
- The New Adventures of Zorro (2000 – 14 May 2008) (Action)
- The New Woody Woodpecker Show (2001–2013) (Comedy)
- New Maple Town Stories: Palm Town Chapter (2000–2026) (Bon Bon)
- Net Ghost PiPoPa (2013) (Adventure)
- NG Knight Ramune & 40 (2005–2012) (Action)
- Nontan (20 July 2000 – 17 December 2020) (Bon Bon)
- Numberblocks (2023–present) (Spacetoon Mum block then Abjad from 2025 onwards)
- Nyanko Days (2026–present) (Zomoroda)
- Octonauts (2020–present) (Adventure)
- Oddbods (Comedy)
- Odin: Photon Sailer Starlight (Movies)
- Offside (1 March 2006 – 1 February 2015) (Sports)
- Ojamajo Doremi (8 February 2006 – 25 December 2016) (Zomoroda)
- Once Upon a Forest (10 November 2017) (Movies)
- Once Upon a Time... Life (11 September 2023; 23 January 2025 – present) (Science)
- Once Upon a Time... The Explorers (2000–2005) (History)
- One Piece (8 March 2008 – 2020) (Adventure) (MBC Action secured the show’s rights forcing Spacetoon to stop airing it)
- Operation Ouch! (12 September 2021 – present) (Science)
- Opti-Morphs (2017–2019) (Action)
- Orange Moo-Cow (2025–present) (Bon Bon)
- Os vigilantes do Camiño (January 2006 – 2013) (Bon Bon)
- Pandalian (2010–2018) (Adventure)
- Pappyland (19 September 2000 – 25 December 2016) (Abjad)
- Peacemaker Kurogane (1 May 2011 – 2020) (Adventure)
- Peanuts (13 May 2000 – 11 April 2014) (Bon Bon)
- Phantom 2040 (12 September 2000 – 24 September 2013) (Action)
- The Pink Panther (14 September 2000 – 24 July 2007) (Comedy)
- The Pink Panther Show (14 June 2014 – 9 September 2017) (Comedy)
- Pink Panther and Sons (2018) (Comedy)
- Pinky and the Brain (6 May 2002 – 9 December 2011) (Comedy)
- Pippi Longstocking (19 October 2003 – 15 April 2014) (Zomoroda)
- Pocoyo (2015–2020) (Abjad)
- Pokémon (2000) (Adventure)
- Police Academy (14 April 2000 – 19 December 2014) (Comedy)
- Popeye and Son (2008) (Adventure)
- Popples (3 September 2018 – present) (Zomoroda)
- Pound Puppies (2000 – 26 October 2013) (Bon Bon)
- The Powerpuff Girls (23 July 2004 – 11 April 2008) (Zomoroda)
- Power Rangers Beast Morphers (2019–2021) (Action)
- Power Rangers Dino Charge (March 2016 – April 2017) (Action)
- Power Rangers Dino Fury (2021–2023) (Action)
- Power Rangers Ninja Steel (2017–2019) (Action)
- The Prince of Tennis (Sports)
- Princess Castle (Movies)
- Princess Sarah (2000–2016) (Zomoroda)
- ProStars (27 August 2000 – 24 July 2007) (Sports)
- Rafadan Tayfa (2026–present) (Adventure)
- The Rainbow Fish (Movies)
- Rainbow Fish (4 April 2002 – 12 September 2018) (Bon Bon)
- Rainbow Ruby (2018) (Zomoroda)
- Ranma ½ (12 January 2011 – 12 December 2016) (Adventure)
- The Real Adventures of Jonny Quest (27 May 2000 – 24 July 2007) (Action)
- Remi, Nobody's Girl (2000–2016) (Zomoroda)
- Rescue Heroes (2005 – 6 December 2005) (Action)
- Rev & Roll (7 September 2020 – present) (Adventure)
- Ricky Zoom (Adventure)
- Road Rovers (2003 – 16 June 2007) (Action)
- Robots (Movies)
- Rolie Polie Olie (30 June 2004 – 30 March 2012) (Bon Bon)
- Romeo's Blue Skies (2000 – 10 September 2017) (Adventure)
- Roofters (Bon Bon)
- Rubbadubbers (15 May – 20 November 2007) (Adventure)
- Rupert (2000–2014) (Bon Bon)
- Ryan's Mystery Playdate (Adventure)
- Ryan's World Specials (Adventure)
- Samurai Jack (January 2006 – 2012) (Adventure)
- Samurai 7 (2009–2020) (Action then Adventure)
- Sangokushi (2000 – 21 October 2020) (History then Adventure in 2013)
- Scan2Go (2012–2014) (Sports)
- The Scooby-Doo Show (27 June 2000 – 22 April 2009) (Comedy)
- Secret of Cerulean Sand (2006–2015) (Zomoroda)
- The Secret Garden (2000–2016) (Zomoroda)
- Secret Life of Toys (2000–2015) (Bon Bon)
- The Secret Lives of Waldo Kitty (Adventure)
- Secret Millionaires Club (12 March 2022 – present) (Science)
- Shaun the Sheep (2026–present) (Comedy)
- Sheep in the Big City (2007–2008) (Comedy)
- Shelley Duvall's Bedtime Stories (2005–2013) (Movies)
- Sherlock Holmes in the 22nd Century (2015–2018) (Adventure then Space Power TV block from 2018 onwards)
- Shin Hakkenden (2003–2017) (Action)
- Silverwing (Action)
- Simba: The King Lion (2000 – 30 March 2012) (Adventure)
- Sitting Ducks (16 May 2004 – 26 September 2014) (Comedy)
- Slam Dunk (2000 – 26 November 2015) (Sports)
- Slash (Action)
- Slugterra (7 January 2024) (Action)
- The Smurfs (1981) (19 July 2000 – 9 December 2007) (Adventure)
- The Smurfs (2021) (3 July 2022 – present) (Adventure then Comedy from 2025 onwards)
- Snorks (19 July 2003 – 18 December 2006) (Adventure)
- Sonic Boom (13 November 2017 – 14 February 2019) (formerly aired on Cartoon Network Arabic) (Adventure)
- Sonic the Hedgehog (12 January 2005 – 21 February 2015) (Adventure)
- Space Ranger Roger (4 April 2021 – present) (Adventure)
- Space Warrior Baldios (2006–2015) (Action)
- Spacetoon Interactive Game (19 January 2005 – 21 May 2009) (Science)
- Special Armored Battalion Dorvack (2006–2015) (Action)
- The Spooktacular New Adventures of Casper (2002 – 9 December 2011) (Comedy)
- Stickin' Around (10 April 2006 – 24 September 2013) (Comedy)
- Stone Protectors (2003 – 31 March 2015) (Action)
- The Story of Cinderella (2000–2014) (Zomoroda)
- Strange Dawn (2003 – 21 October 2016) (Action)
- Strawberry Shortcake (2003) (1 April 2005 – 10 December 2014) (Zomoroda)
- Strawberry Shortcake: Berry in the Big City (11 August 2024 – present) (Zomoroda)
- Street Fighter (2000–2014) (Action)
- Street Sharks (2000 – 14 December 2011) (Action)
- Super Dave: Daredevil for Hire (2001–2013) (Comedy)
- The Super Dimension Fortress Macross (2006–2015) (Action)
- Super Duper Sumos (15 June 2003 – 23 October 2013) (Comedy then Sports)
- Super Little Fanta Heroes (2001–2014) (History then Action in 2014)
- Super Mario World (16 July 2000 – 15 March 2015) (Adventure)
- Super Wings (2017–present) (Adventure)
- Super Yo-Yo (7 March 2004 – 27 August 2016) (Action)
- Superman: The Animated Series (13 June 2000 – 10 October 2012) (Action)
- Superhuman Samurai Syber-Squad (12 January 2005 – 2008) (Adventure)
- SWAT Kats: The Radical Squadron (2000–2004) (Action)
- The Swiss Family Robinson: Flone of the Mysterious Island (2015–2019; 2024–present) (Adventure then Spacetoon Treasures block in 2024)
- The Sylvester & Tweety Mysteries (4 March 2002 – 22 April 2009) (Comedy)
- Tama and Friends (27 July 2000 – 26 July 2016; 2018–2020) (Bon Bon)
- Tanken Driland (Adventure)
- Tanoshī Willow Town (2000–2015) (Bon Bon)
- Taz-Mania (1 March 2002 – 8 October 2010) (Comedy)
- Teenage Mutant Ninja Turtles (1987) (27 March 2000 – 31 December 2003) (Action)
- Teenage Mutant Ninja Turtles (2003) (24 February 2005 – 1 January 2011) (Action)
- Tekken Chinmi Legends (10 July 2000 – 30 November 2016; 5 July – 15 September 2020) (reruns) (Sports)
- Teletubbies (1997) (1 April 2005 – 1 January 2011) (Abjad)
- Teletubbies (2015) (Season 1 Part 1: 9 October 2017 – 12 February 2020; 22 June 2020 – 2021) (Season 1 Part 2: 18 September 2022 – present) (Bon Bon)
- Teletubbies: Let's Go! (2026–present) (Bon Bon)
- That's Joey! (16 September 2024 – present) (Adventure)
- Thomas & Friends: Sodor's Legend of the Lost Treasure (Movies)
- Thomas & Friends (7 September 2015 – 2022) (Bon Bon)
- Thomas & Friends: Tale of the Brave (Movies)
- Thunder Jet (31 March 2000 – 21 October 2020) (Action)
- The Tom and Jerry Comedy Show (1 March 2002 – 14 June 2014) (Comedy)
- The Tom & Jerry Show (1 March 2002 – 14 June 2014) (Comedy)
- Tico & Friends (2000 – 23 February 2015; 2024–present) (Adventure then Spacetoon Treasures block in 2024)
- Tig & Leo (7 September 2020 – present) (Adventure)
- Tiger Mask (2000 – 27 September 2016) (Action then Sports in 2013)
- Tiny Toon Adventures (5 April 2003 – 2 December 2011) (Comedy)
- Titeuf (7 April – 16 December 2007) (Comedy)
- The Tom & Jerry Kids Show (13 July 2000 – 31 December 2005) (Comedy)
- Tom and Jerry (4 April 2001 – 22 November 2015) (Comedy)
- Tommy and Oscar (8 June 2001 – 16 June 2008) (Adventure)
- Tonbo! (2025–present) (Sports)
- Topo Gigio (1988) (1 September 2000 – 15 April 2014) (Adventure)
- Topo Gigio (2020) (26 June 2023 – present) (Adventure)
- Toy Toons (Bon Bon)
- Transformers: Cyberverse (22 March 2020 – present) (Action)
- Transformers: Rescue Bots Academy (8 March 2021 – present) (Adventure)
- Trapp Family Story (1 May 2001 – 8 January 2015) (Zomoroda)
- Treasure Island (12 September 2000 – 12 November 2013) (Adventure)
- True and the Rainbow Kingdom (16 October 2021 – present) (Zomoroda)
- Trucktown (4 April 2016 – 16 July 2017; 2020–present) (Adventure)
- Tsurikichi Sanpei (2000 – 10 October 2020) (Adventure)
- Tsuyoshi Shikkari Shinasai (1 June 2007 – 10 October 2020) (Adventure)
- The Twisted Tales of Felix the Cat (2002 – 24 July 2007) (Adventure)
- Ultraforce (2000 – 31 October 2014) (Action)
- Vegesaurs (2026–present) (Bon Bon)
- Vehicle Kingdom Boo Boo Can Kang (2006–2013) (Bon Bon)
- Virtua Fighter (2004 – 26 September 2016) (Action)
- Voltron: The Third Dimension (2000–2012) (Action)
- Vor-Tech: Undercover Conversion Squad (Action)
- Votexity (2018–present) (Sports)
- The Wacky World of Tex Avery (10 February 2007 – 1 September 2017) (Comedy)
- Wayside (2017–2018; 2019) (Comedy)
- What-a-Mess (10 May 2004 – 26 September 2014) (Comedy)
- What's New, Scooby-Doo? (2005 – 22 April 2009) (Comedy)
- Where's Chicky (12 September 2016 – 17 April 2021) (Comedy)
- Where on Earth Is Carmen Sandiego? (2007–2013) (Adventure)
- Wild West C.O.W.-Boys of Moo Mesa (28 April 2004 – 22 November 2013) (Action)
- Wing Commander Academy (2003–2012) (Action)
- Wish Kid (15 August 2004 – 14 August 2014) (Adventure)
- Wondrous Myths & Legends (Adventure)
- World Famous Tales (15 July 2005 – 23 April 2016) (History then Adventure in 2013)
- Xiaolin Showdown (2007–2008) (Action)
- Yo-kai Watch (12 September 2016 – 26 July 2018) (Adventure)
- Yo Yogi! (2000–2011) (Comedy)
- Yogi's Treasure Hunt (2000–2008) (Comedy)
- Zafari (2 February 2019 – present) (Adventure)
- Zak Storm (10 September 2018) (Adventure)
- Zak Tales (2006–2013) (Bon Bon)

=== Space Power TV block programming (2016–present) ===
- Ascendance of a Bookworm (2021; Anime)
- Black Cat (2016; Anime)
- Chiquititas (1995 TV Argentina series) (2019–2026; Drama)
- Detective Conan: The Black Iron Submarine (2022; Movies)
- Detective Conan Movie 27: The Million Dollar (2024; Movies)
- Detective Conan: The Scarlet Bullet (2022; Movies)
- Fist of the North Star (2016–present; Anime)
- Flame of Recca (2016–present; Anime)
- Fushigi Yûgi (2016–present; Anime)
- Futari wa Pretty Cure Splash Star (July 2023; Anime) (Exclusive to Spacetoon Go)
- Gad Guard (2016–present; Anime)
- Gankutsuou: The Count of Monte Cristo (2016–present; Anime)
- Girls' Last Tour (2021, 3 January 2025; Anime)
- Glass Fleet (2016–present; Anime)
- the Great Passage (2016 TV anime series) (2024; Anime)
- Hakugei: Legend of the Moby Dick (2016–present; Anime)
- Hetty Feather (2021; Drama)
- Hunter × Hunter (2011 TV series) (2020; Anime)
- Omimi ni aimashitara. (31 January 2025) (Exclusive to Spacetoon Go)
- InuYasha (2016–present; Anime)
- Iria: Zeiram the Animation (2016–present; Anime)
- Laid Back Camp (TV 2020 live action series) (2021; Drama) (Exclusive to Spacetoon Go)
- Last Exile (2016–present; Anime)
- Laughing Under the Clouds (2022; Anime)
- Lupin III: The First (2021; Movies)
- Made in Abyss (2022; Anime)
- Magic Kaito (2019; Anime) (Exclusive to Spacetoon Go)
- Malory Towers (Drama)
- The Marginal Service (2023, 10 January 2025; Anime) (Exclusive to Spacetoon Go)
- Mazinger Z: Infinity (2018; Movies)
- Megalo Box (2021; Anime) (Exclusive to Spacetoon Go)
- My Hero Academia (2022–present; Anime)
- Naruto (2017–present; Anime)
- One Piece (2016–2020 rebroadcast in 2024; Anime)
- Peacemaker Kurogane (2016–present; Anime)
- Poco's Udon World (2022; Anime)
- The Return of Izenborg (2017; Movies)
- Samurai 7 (2016–present; Anime)
- Sherlock Holmes in the 22nd Century (2018–present; Anime)
- Shura no Toki (2019–2022; Anime)
- SoltyRei (2016–present; Anime)
- The Sword and the Chess of Death (1 August 2018 – present; Drama)
- Tokyo Magnitude 8.0 (2023; Anime)
- Usagi Drop (2020; Anime)
- Zaion: I Wish You Were Here (2016–present; Anime)

== Spacetoon English (2005–2011) ==
=== Former programming ===
- Adventures from the Book of Virtues (Adventure)
- Anatole (Adventure)
- Animaniacs (Comedy)
- Babar (Bon Bon)
- Captain Tsubasa: Road to 2002 (Sports)
- The Care Bears Family (Bon Bon)
- Detective Conan (Action)
- Dexter's Laboratory (Comedy)
- Fifi and the Flowertots (Zomoroda)
- Franklin (Alpha)
- Inspector Gadget's Field Trip (Science)
- Jim Henson's Animal Show (Science)
- Life by the Numbers (Science)
- Little Clowns of Happytown (Bon Bon)
- Little Robots (Bon Bon)
- Looney Tunes (Comedy)
- Madeline (Zomoroda)
- Mickey Mouse Clubhouse (Bon Bon)
- Mobile Suit Gundam Wing (Action)
- ¡Mucha Lucha! (Comedy)
- Pinky and the Brain (Comedy)
- The Powerpuff Girls (Zomoroda)
- Rolie Polie Olie (Bon Bon)
- Rubbadubbers (Bon Bon)
- Scooby-Doo (Comedy)
- Sonic the Hedgehog (Adventure)
- Super Mario World (Adventure)
- Super Yo-Yo (Action)
- Strawberry Shortcake (2003) (Zomoroda)
- Teletubbies (Alpha)
- Tom and Jerry (Comedy)
- The Tom and Jerry Comedy Show (Comedy)
- Tom & Jerry Kids (Comedy)
- Zak Tales (Bon Bon)

== Spacetoon Turkey ==
=== Current and former programming ===
- 44 Cats (20 January 2025 – present) (Comedy)
- The Adventures of Little Penguin (20 January 2025 – present) (Adventure)
- The Adventures of Paddington (20 January 2025 – present) (Adventure)
- Beep Boop (1 January 2026 – present) (Comedy)
- Beyblade X (10 March 2025 – present) (Sports)
- Blippi Visits (August 2026 – present) (Alpha)
- Blippi Wonders (3 September 2026 – present) (Alpha)
- Bluey (6 October 2025 – present) (Comedy)
- Chibi Maruko-chan (9 May 2026 – present) (Zomoroda)
- Cocomelon (April 2026 – present) (Bon Bon)
- Doraemon (20 January 2025 – present) (Science)
- Elinor Wonders Why (20 January 2025 – 2026) (Bon Bon)
- Inazuma Eleven (13 January 2025 – present) (Sports)
- Kamen Rider ZEZTZ (May 2026 – present) (Action)
- Kamisama Minarai: Himitsu no Cocotama (13 January 2025 – present) (Zomoroda)
- Kid Lucky (20 January 2025 – present) (Adventure)
- Kiteretsu Daihyakka (20 January 2025 – mid-2026) (Science)
- Kon'nichiwa Anne: Before Green Gables (7 July 2026 – present) (Zomoroda)
- Kuroko's Basketball (20 January 2025 – present) (Sports)
- The Magic School Bus Rides Again (3 September 2026 – present) (Science)
- Marco: Carry a Dream (14 August 2026) (Movies)
- Mia the Mouse (2025–present) (Bon Bon)
- Naruto (20 January 2025 – present) (Action)
- Oddbods (May 2026 – present) (Comedy)
- Sinbad (7 August 2026) (Movies)
- Slugterra (20 January 2025 – present) (Action)
- Slugterra: Ascension (April 2026 – present) (Action)
- Strawberry Shortcake: Berry in the Big City (20 January 2025 – present) (Zomoroda)
- The Smurfs (20 January 2025 – present) (Comedy)
- Tara Duncan (20 January 2026 – present) (Action)
- That's Joey! (27 October 2025 – present) (Comedy)
- Topo Gigio (13 January 2025 – present) (Comedy then Bon Bon from late 2025 onwards)
- Zafari (20 January 2025 – present) (Adventure)
- Zatonya (25 January 2025 – present) (Science)

== Spacetoon Indonesia ==
=== Former programming ===
- 1000 Questions (Science)
- Absolute Boy (Adventure)
- Adventures of Sonic the Hedgehog (10 April 2017) (Comedy)
- Akakichi no Eleven (Sports)
- Akazukin Chacha (Bon Bon)
- Alpen Rose (Zomoroda)
- Animasi Kunci (Alpha)
- Around the World with Willy Fog (History)
- Asari-chan (Comedy)
- Ashita no Nadja (Zomoroda)
- Ask Dr. Rin! (Adventure then Zomoroda)
- Atashin'chi (Comedy)
- Ayo Gambar (Alpha)
- The Babaloos (Bon Bon, also shown as an interstitial series)
- Babar (Bon Bon)
- Babar and the Adventures of Badou (Bon Bon)
- Baby & Me (Bon Bon)
- Bakusō Kyōdai Let's & Go!! (2005–2010, 2012) (Sports)
- Balala the Fairies (Zomoroda)
- Bandolero (Action)
- Beranda Anak (Bon Bon)
- The Berenstain Bears (Bon Bon)
- The BFG (Movies)
- Big Mouth Dudu (Comedy)
- Bistro Recipe (Action then Adventure)
- Blazing Teens (Sports)
- Bobby Bola (Alpha then Bon Bon)
- Boom & Reds (interstital)
- Care Bears (Bon Bon)
- Casshan (Action)
- Captain Tsubasa (Sports)
- Chibi Maruko-chan (Comedy)
- Christopher Columbus (History)
- Code Lyoko (Action)
- Cooking Class (Alpha)
- Cooking Master Boy (Adventure)
- Cooking with Mom (Zomoroda)
- Corrector Yui (Zomoroda)
- Croket! (Adventure)
- Cyberchase (Science)
- Cyborg Kuro-chan (Bon Bon then Action)
- Daigunder (Action)
- Dan Doh!! (Sports)
- Dash! Yonkuro (Sports)
- Dharma for Kids (Alpha)
- Di Gi Charat (Zomoroda)
- Didavision (Science)
- Digimon Adventure (Action)
- Digimon Adventure 02 (Action)
- Digimon Frontier (Action)
- Digimon Tamers (Action)
- Dragon (Bon Bon)
- Dragon Ball (Action)
- Dragon Ball GT (Action)
- Dragon Ball Z (Action)
- Dragon League (Sports)
- Dunia Ceria Anak (Bon Bon)
- Ellen's Acres (Adventure)
- Elliot Moose (Bon Bon)
- English Time (Alpha)
- F-Zero: GP Legend (Adventure)
- Fantasy Adventure: Nagagutsu o Haita Neko no Bōken (Adventure)
- Ferdy the Ant (Adventure)
- Finley the Fire Engine (Bon Bon)
- Flash & Dash (Sports)
- Franklin (Bon Bon)
- Franklin and Friends (Bon Bon)
- Franklin's Magic Christmas (Movies)
- Future Boy Conan (Adventure)
- Game.tv (Alpha)
- Gatchaman (Action)
- GeGeGe no Kitarō (1985) (Action)
- George and Martha (Bon Bon then Comedy)
- Go for Speed (Sports)
- GoShogun: The Time Étranger (Movies)
- Hakim Pao (Movies)
- Hamtaro (Comedy)
- Happy Holy Kids (Alpha)
- Heathcliff (2017) (Comedy)
- HHK Muppet Show (Bon Bon)
- Hikari no Densetsu (Zomoroda then Sports)
- Honeybee Hutch (1989) (2007–2008; 14 September 2017 – present) (Bon Bon then Adventure)
- Honō no Dōkyūji: Dodge Danpei (Sports)
- Huckleberry Finn (Adventure)
- Hungry Heart: Wild Striker (Sports)
- Hunter × Hunter (Adventure then Action)
- Inakappe Taishō (Comedy)
- Invizimals (Unknown)
- Iris, The Happy Professor (Alpha)
- Iron Kid (Action)
- IToon (Comedy then Bon Bon)
- Jackie Chan's Fantasia (Unknown)
- Jane and the Dragon (Adventure)
- Jang Geum's Dream (Zomoroda)
- Jankenman (Comedy)
- Jeanie with the Light Brown Hair (Zomoroda)
- Johan the Young Scientist (Science)
- The Journey of Puss 'n Boots (Adventure then Action)
- Judo Boy (Action)
- Jungle Book Shōnen Mowgli (Adventure)
- Jungle Emperor Leo (Adventure)
- The Jungle King (Movies)
- Jungle Run (Sports)
- Just for Laughs Gags (Comedy)
- Kaleido Star (Zomoroda)
- Kamichama Karin (Comedy then Zomoroda)
- Kickers (Sports)
- King (2017) (Unknown)
- Kiramekiman (Adventure)
- Kobo Chan (Comedy)
- Kuis Smart (Science)
- Kung Food (Adventure)
- Kung Fu Boy (Action then Sports)
- Kung Fu Cat (Unknown)
- Kung Fu Story of Taiji Panda (Action then Bon Bon)
- The Legend of Snow White (Zomoroda)
- La Suegra (Movies)
- Legend of Heavenly Sphere Shurato (Action)
- Legendz: Tale of the Dragon Kings (Action)
- Lightning Super Express Hikarian (Bon Bon then Action then Bon Bon)
- Lihat Animasiku (Alpha)
- Little Bear (Bon Bon then Adventure)
- The Little Bear Movie (Movies)
- Little Star (Bon Bon)
- Little Women II: Jo's Boys (Zomoroda)
- Mach Go Go Go (Sports)
- Machine Robo: Battle Hackers (Action)
- The Magic House (Bon Bon)
- The Magic School Bus (Alpha then Science)
- Magical DoReMi (Zomoroda)
- Magical Angel Sweet Mint (Zomoroda)
- Magical Emi, the Magic Star (Zomoroda)
- Magical Princess Minky Momo (Zomoroda)
- The Making of Wallace & Gromit (Movies)
- Mary Bell (Zomoroda)
- Masked Rider 555 (Action)
- Max & Ruby (Bon Bon)
- Mecha Blade (Comedy)
- The Mechnimals (Action)
- MetaJets (Action)
- Midnight Horror School (Comedy)
- Miss Spider's Sunny Patch Friends (Bon Bon)
- Miss Spider's Sunny Patch Friends: The Prince, the Princess and the Bee (Movies)
- Moero!! Robocon (Bon Bon)
- Monchhichi (interstitial)
- Mother Goose and Grimm (Comedy)
- Mr. Moon (Science)
- Mr. Young (Comedy)
- Muteking, The Dashing Warrior (Comedy)
- My Daddy Long Legs (Zomoroda)
- Nanami's Animal Attic (Science)
- NG Knight Ramune & 40 (Action)
- NGETEM (Science)
- Ninja Hattori-kun (Comedy)
- Norakuro-kun (Comedy)
- Ocha-Ken (interstitial)
- Odd Family (Science)
- Offside (Sports)
- Oggy and the Cockroaches (Comedy)
- Once Upon a Time... Life (Science then History)
- Once Upon a Time... Man (History)
- Once Upon a Time... Space (Science then History)
- Once Upon a Time... The Americas (History)
- Once Upon a Time... The Discoverers (History)
- Once Upon a Time... The Explorers (History)
- One Piece (Action)
- Oriental Child Prodigy (Adventure)
- Origami Warriors (Action)
- Pandalian (Adventure)
- Panggung Durian (Bon Bon)
- Pastel Yumi, the Magic Idol (Zomoroda)
- Paul's Miraculous Adventure (Adventure)
- Pecola (Comedy then Bon Bon)
- Persia, the Magic Fairy (Zomoroda)
- Peter Pan & Wendy (Adventure)
- Pinguin (Adventure)
- Pinocchio: The Series (History)
- Pintar Menggambar (Alpha)
- Pippi Longstocking (Adventure)
- Pleasant Goat and Big Big Wolf: The Athletic Carousel (Sports)
- Power Master Maxman (Action)
- Pretty Cure (Zomoroda)
- Pretty Cure Max Heart (Zomoroda)
- Princess Castle (Movies)
- Princess Comet (2007–2011) (Zomoroda)
- Princess Knight (Zomoroda)
- Princess Tutu (Zomoroda)
- Quiz Me Science (Science)
- Qur'an's Story (History)
- Rahan (13 April 2017) (Adventure)
- Raindrop: Water is Adventure (Science and Movies then Adventure)
- Ramadhan Bersama Mio (Alpha)
- Remi, Nobody's Girl (Zomoroda)
- RevEvolution (Sports then Action)
- Robin Hood (Adventure)
- Rocky Rackat! (Comedy)
- Rolie Polie Olie (Bon Bon)
- Ronaldinho Gaucho's Team (Sports)
- Sehat Bersama Herbal (Alpha)
- Saint Seiya (Action)
- Scaredy Squirrel (Comedy)
- Secret Millionaires Club (Science)
- Sehat Bersama Herbal (Alpha)
- Semua Ada Disini (Alpha)
- Shanmao & Jimi (Bon Bon)
- Shimmer's Bowtique (Bon Bon)
- Shin Hakkenden (Action)
- The Shoe People (Bon Bon)
- Siapa Sih Dia? (Alpha)
- Sneezing Magician (Comedy)
- The Song of Tentomushi (Comedy)
- Special Armored Battalion Dorvack (Action)
- Suckers (interstitial)
- Sugar Princess (Zomoroda then Comedy)
- Survive This (Adventure)
- Super Dimension Fortress Macross (Action)
- Sylvanian Families (Bon Bon)
- Tanoshī Willow Town (Adventure)
- Tasuke, the Samurai Cop (Action)
- Thomas Edison's Secret Lab (Science)
- Thumbelina: A Magical Story (Zomoroda)
- Time Bokan (Comedy then Adventure then Comedy then Adventure)
- Time Quest (Adventure)
- Tiny Planets (Bon Bon then Science)
- Tokyo Mew Mew (Zomoroda)
- Tomorrow's Joe (Sports)
- Toopy and Binoo (Bon Bon, later shown as an interstitial series)
- Topo Gigio (Adventure)
- Transformers: Cybertron (Action)
- Treasure from the Past (History)
- Trouble Chocolate (Zomoroda then Comedy)
- Turtle Island (Adventure then Bon Bon)
- Ultra Maniac (Zomoroda)
- Web Diver (Action then Sports)
- The Wonderful Wizard of Oz (Bon Bon then Adventure)
- World Famous Tales (History then Movies)
- XX Bom Swirl Fighter (Sports)
- Yatterman (Comedy then Adventure)
- Yoroshiku Mechadock (Sports)
- Yu-Gi-Oh! (2007–2009) (Action)
- Zenderman (Adventure)
- Zillion (Action)
- Zoobabu (interstitial)
- Zumbers (interstitial)

== Spacetoon South Korea ==
=== Former programming ===
- Animal Quiz (NHK) (2007; 2009 – 15 November 2011) (Science)
- Attacker You! (2010 – 15 November 2011) (Comedy)
- B-Robo Kabutack (Action then Adventure from 2009 onwards)
- Bakusō Kyōdai Let's & Go!! (Sports)
- Bakusō Kyōdai Let's & Go!! MAX (Sports)
- Bakusō Kyōdai Let's & Go!! WGP (Action)
- BASToF Lemon (2009 – 15 November 2011) (Adventure)
- Blazing Teens (Sports then Adventure from 2009 onwards)
- Bob the Builder (October 2005 – 4 November 2007; 2009 – 15 November 2011) (Bon Bon)
- Bubu Chacha (2006 – 4 November 2007; 2009) (Bon Bon)
- Capelito (2009) (Bon Bon)
- Captain Tsubasa (October 2005 – 4 November 2007; 2009 – 15 November 2011) (Sports)
- Doki Doki School Hours (2009 – 15 November 2011) (Space Power block)
- Fimbles (2007) (Bon Bon)
- Fun with Math (NHK) (2007; 2009 – 15 November 2011) (Alpha)
- High School Girls (2009 – 15 November 2011) (Space Power block)
- Hikarian: Great Railroad Protector (October 2005 – 4 November 2007; 2009 – 2010) (Action)
- In the Night Garden... (2010 – 15 November 2011) (Bon Bon)
- Johan the Young Scientist (2009) (Science)
- Korean short cartoons (Movies)
- Little People (Alpha)
- Little Women II: Jo's Boys (October 2005 – 4 November 2007; 2009 – 15 November 2011) (Zomoroda)
- Matteo (Movies)
- Ninja Nonsense (2009 – 15 November 2011) (Space Power block)
- Offside (October 2005 – 4 November 2007; 2009 – 2010) (Sports)
- Pani Poni Dash! (2009 – 15 November 2011) (Space Power block)
- Pastel Yumi, the Magic Idol (October 2005 – 4 November 2007; 2009 – 15 November 2011) (Zomoroda)
- Pecola (October 2005 – 4 November 2007; 2010 – 15 November 2011) (Comedy)
- Persia, the Magic Fairy (Zomoroda)
- Petopeto-san (2009 – 15 November 2011) (Space Power block)
- Romeo's Blue Skies (October 2005 – 4 November 2007; 2009) (Adventure)
- Sangokushi (October 2005 – 4 November 2007; 2009) (History)
- SportsKids (October 2005 – 4 November 2007; 2009 – 15 November 2011) (Sports)
- Strawberry Marshmallow (2009 – 15 November 2011) (Space Power block)
- Teletubbies (2007; 2009 – 15 November 2011) (Bon Bon)
- Tetsuwan Tantei Robotack (Action then Adventure)
- Tico of the Seven Seas (October 2005 – 4 November 2007; 2009) (Adventure)
- Tweenies (2006 – 4 November 2007; 2009 – 15 November 2011) (Bon Bon)
- Uniminipet (2009; 2011) (Comedy)
- Wild (Alpha)
- World Children (Bon Bon)
- World Famous Fairy Tale Series (Movies)
- World Famous Tales (Bon Bon)

== Spacetoon India ==
=== Former programming ===
- Action Man (Action)
- Auto Cat
- Baby & Me
- Barney & Friends
- Bump in the Night (Comedy)
- Crush Gear
- Fafa & Juno
- Hello Kitty's Paradise (Zomoroda)
- Idol Densetsu Eriko
- Incredible Dennis
- Inspector Fabre (Adventure)
- Inspector Gadget's Field Trip
- Little Clowns of Happytown
- Lost Universe
- Offside (Sports)
- Plusters
- Ryukendo
- Sherlock Holmes in the 22nd Century
- Shin Hakkenden
- Simba, the King Lion
- Sonic the Hedgehog (Action)
- Super Little Fanta Heroes
- The Great Book of Nature (Adventure)
- Toy Toons
- Wild West C.O.W.-Boys of Moo Mesa
- Willow Town
- Wish Kid (Adventure)
