= List of Case Closed episodes (seasons 31–current) =

Episodes 1000 onwards of Case Closed

Third North American anime key visual featuring Ran Mori (Rachel Moore) (left), Kogoro Mori (Richard Moore), and Conan Edogawa (right)

The Case Closed anime series, known as Meitantei Conan (名探偵コナン, lit. Great Detective Conan, officially translated as Detective Conan) in its original release in Japan, is based on the manga series of the same name by Gosho Aoyama. It was localized in English as Case Closed by Funimation due to unspecified legal problems. The anime is produced by TMS Entertainment and Yomiuri Telecasting Corporation with the directors being Kenji Kodama, Yasuichiro Yamamoto, Masato Satō, Kōjin Ochi, and Nobuharu Kamanaka. The series follows the teenage detective Jimmy Kudo, who transforms into a child after being poisoned with APTX 4869 by the Black Organization. Now named Conan Edogawa and living with the Moores, Conan solves murders during his daily life as he awaits the day to defeat the Black Organization.

Case Closed premiered on January 8, 1996 on Yomiuri TV, Nippon Television and their affiliates in Japan and is currently ongoing. It has aired over 1100 episodes in Japan making it the fifteenth longest running anime series. In 2010, Yomiuri Telecasting Corporation began making the episodes available for video on demand. The anime spun off theatrical films, two OVA series and a TV special titled Lupin the 3rd vs Detective Conan, these spin offs were created with the same staff and cast as the anime series. The theme music supplier for the series was initially Universal Music Group, whom released the first two openings and ending theme songs, and is currently Being Incorporated.

In 2003, the first 104 episodes were licensed by Funimation for distribution in North America under the name Case Closed where it debuted on Cartoon Network's Adult Swim programming block on May 24, 2004, no more than 50 episodes were licensed from Funimation due to low ratings. The Canadian channel YTV picked up the Case Closed series and broadcast 22 episodes between April 7, 2006, and September 2, 2006, before taking it off the air. Funimation made the series available with the launch of the Funimation Channel in November 2005 and was temporarily available on Colours TV during its syndication with the Funimation Channel. Funimation began streaming Case Closed episodes on their website in March 2013.

A separate English adaptation of the series by Animax Asia premiered in the Philippines on January 18, 2006, under the name Detective Conan. Because Animax were unable to obtain further TV broadcast rights, their version comprised 52 episodes. The series continued with reruns until August 7, 2006, when it was removed from the station. Meitantei Conan has also been localized in other languages such as French, German, and Italian. As of 2018, the Detective Conan anime has been broadcast in 40 countries around the world.Crunchyroll began simulcasting the series in October 2014, starting with episode 754. It was revealed in February 2023 that TMS Entertainment commissioned a new English dub of Case Closed, with episodes of the anime beginning streaming on Tubi that same month, starting at episode #965. This marked the first English dub for the series since 2010. The dub is produced by Florida-based studio Macias Group with a new dub cast (except for the voices of Shinichi, Conan, Ran, Kogoro, and Kaito Kid, whose voice actors were retained from the Bang Zoom! Entertainment home video dubs).

== Seasons overview ==
These "seasons" are based on the Japanese DVDs released by Shogakukan starting on February 24, 2006. (see Home media release section) In Japan, Case Closed runs continuously on TV with very few weeks off.

Season	Episodes	Originally released	
Season	Episodes	First released	Last released
31	40	March 6, 2021	April 16, 2022
32	40	April 23, 2022	April 8, 2023
33	143	April 15, 2023	TBA

== Episodes ==
=== Season 31 (2021–22) ===
No. overall	No. in season	Title	Directed by	Written by	Original release date	English release date
1000	1	"The Moonlight Sonata Murder (Part One)"; Transliteration: "Piano Sonata "Gekkō" Satsujin Jiken (Zenpen)" (Japanese: ピアノソナタ『月光』殺人事件（前編）)	Akira Yoshimura	N/A	March 6, 2021	March 15, 2023
1001	2	"The Moonlight Sonata Murder (Part Two)"; Transliteration: "Piano Sonata "Gekkō" Satsujin Jiken (Kōhen)" (Japanese: ピアノソナタ『月光』殺人事件（後編）)	Yasuichirō Yamamoto	N/A	March 13, 2021	March 15, 2023
1002	3	"The Beika City Shopping Center Garbage Bin Mystery"; Transliteration: "Beika Shōtengai Dasuto Misuterī" (Japanese: 米花商店街ダストミステリー)	Nobuharu Kamanaka	Takeharu Sakurai	April 17, 2021	March 15, 2023
1003	4	"The 36-Cell Perfect Game (Part One)"; Transliteration: "Sanjūroku Masu no Pāfekuto Gēmu (Zenpen)" (Japanese: 36マスの完全犯罪（前編）)	Akira Yoshimura	N/A	April 24, 2021	March 16, 2023
1004	5	"The 36-Cell Perfect Game (Part Two)"; Transliteration: "Sanjūroku Masu no Pāfekuto Gēmu (Chūhen)" (Japanese: 36マスの完全犯罪（中編）)	Minoru Tozawa	N/A	May 1, 2021	March 15, 2023
1005	6	"The 36-Cell Perfect Game (Part Three)"; Transliteration: "Sanjūroku Masu no Pāfekuto Gēmu (Kōhen)" (Japanese: 36マスの完全犯罪（後編）)	Nobuharu Kamanaka	N/A	May 8, 2021	March 15, 2023
1006	7	"Who Poisoned the Victim?"; Transliteration: "Doku o Ireta no wa Dare" (Japanese: 毒を入れたのは誰)	Kōichirō Kuroda	Masaki Tsuji	May 15, 2021	March 29, 2023
1007	8	"Out For Revenge (Part One)"; Transliteration: "Fukushūsha (Zenpen)" (Japanese: 復讐者（前編）)	Masahiro Takada	Nobuo Ōgizawa	June 5, 2021	March 29, 2023
1008	9	"Out For Revenge (Part Two)"; Transliteration: "Fukushūsha (Kōhen)" (Japanese: 復讐者（後編）)	Rokō Ogiwara	Nobuo Ōgizawa	June 12, 2021	March 29, 2023
1009	10	"The Lost Article That Smells Like a Case"; Transliteration: "Otoshimono wa Jiken no Nioi" (Japanese: 落とし物は事件のにおい)	Minoru Tozawa	Jun'ichi Iioka Chisato Matsuda	June 19, 2021	March 29, 2023
1010	11	"The Idol Whose Smile Disappeared"; Transliteration: "Egao o Keshita Aidoru" (Japanese: 笑顔を消したアイドル)	Hiroaki Takagi	Yoshio Urasawa	June 26, 2021	March 29, 2023
1011	12	"Picking Wild Plants and Clovers (Part One)"; Transliteration: "Sansai Gari to Kurōbā (Zenpen)" (Japanese: 山菜狩りとクローバー（前編）)	Kōichirō Kuroda	N/A	July 10, 2021	March 29, 2023
1012	13	"Picking Wild Plants and Clovers (Part Two)"; Transliteration: "Sansai Gari to Kurōbā (Kōhen)" (Japanese: 山菜狩りとクローバー（後編）)	Masahiro Takada	N/A	July 17, 2021	March 29, 2023
1013	14	"The Man Who Loved Too Much"; Transliteration: "Aishi Sugita Otoko" (Japanese: 愛しすぎた男)	Ryūta Kawahara	Kōshirō Mikami	July 24, 2021	March 29, 2023
1014	15	"The Novelist Known as the Demon King"; Transliteration: "Maō to Yobareta Shōsetsuka" (Japanese: 魔王と呼ばれた小説家)	Minoru Tozawa	Nobuo Ōgizawa	July 31, 2021	March 29, 2023
1015	16	"Stakeout"; Transliteration: "Harikomi" (Japanese: 張り込み)	Akira Yoshimura	Jun'ichi Iioka Chisato Matsuda	August 14, 2021	–
1016	17	"The Monorail Sniper Case (Part One)"; Transliteration: "Monorēru Sogeki Jiken (Zenpen)" (Japanese: モノレール狙撃事件（前編）)	Kōichirō Kuroda	Akatsuki Yamatoya	August 28, 2021	–
1017	18	"The Monorail Sniper Case (Part Two)"; Transliteration: "Monorēru Sogeki Jiken (Kōhen)" (Japanese: モノレール狙撃事件（後編）)	Masahiro Takada	Akatsuki Yamatoya	September 4, 2021	–
1018	19	"The Antique Tray Can't Be Hidden (Part One)"; Transliteration: "Kottō Bon wa Kakusenai (Zenpen)" (Japanese: 骨董盆は隠せない（前編）)	Tsurumi Mukaiyama	N/A	September 11, 2021	–
1019	20	"The Antique Tray Can't Be Hidden (Part Two)"; Transliteration: "Kottō Bon wa Kakusenai (Chūhen)" (Japanese: 骨董盆は隠せない（中編）)	Minoru Tozawa	N/A	September 18, 2021	–
1020	21	"The Antique Tray Can't Be Hidden (Part Three)"; Transliteration: "Kottō Bon wa Kakusenai (Kōhen)" (Japanese: 骨董盆は隠せない（後編）)	Akira Yoshimura	N/A	September 25, 2021	–
1021	22	"Rondo in Bad Company"; Transliteration: "Akuyū-tachi no Rondo" (Japanese: 悪友たちの輪舞)	Yoshihiro Sugai	Nobuo Ōgizawa	October 2, 2021	–
1022	23	"The Cursed Museum"; Transliteration: "Noroi no Myūjiamu" (Japanese: 呪いのミュージアム)	Kōichirō Kuroda Yōsuke Fujino	Akatsuki Yamatoya	October 9, 2021	–
1023	24	"The Whistling Bookstore 3"; Transliteration: "Kiteki no Kikoeru Kosho-ten Surī" (Japanese: 汽笛の聞こえる古書店3)	Masahiro Takada	Yūki Nōtsuka	October 16, 2021	–
1024	25	"Ooka Momiji's Challenge (Part One)"; Transliteration: "Ōoka Momiji no Chōsenjō (Zenpen)" (Japanese: 大岡紅葉の挑戦状（前編）)	Ryūta Kawahara	N/A	October 30, 2021	–
1025	26	"Ooka Momiji's Challenge (Part Two)"; Transliteration: "Ōoka Momiji no Chōsenjō (Kōhen)" (Japanese: 大岡紅葉の挑戦状（後編）)	Minoru Tozawa	N/A	November 6, 2021	–
1026	27	"The Wordless Witness"; Transliteration: "Ienai Mokugekisha" (Japanese: 言えない目撃者)	Tsurumi Mukaiyama	Tatsurō Inamoto	November 13, 2021	–
1027	28	"Beyond the Curtain"; Transliteration: "Kāten no Mukōgawa" (Japanese: カーテンの向こう側)	Akira Yoshimura	Akatsuki Yamatoya	November 20, 2021	–
1028	29	"Ballad of the Woman Who Loved Cake"; Transliteration: "Kēki o Aisuru Onna no Barādo" (Japanese: ケーキを愛する女のバラード)	Kōichirō Kuroda Yōsuke Fujino	Yoshio Urasawa	November 27, 2021	–
1029	30	"Police Academy Arc Wild Police Story CASE. Matsuda Jinpei"; Transliteration: "Keisatsu Gakkō-hen Wairudo Porīsu Sutōrī Kēsu. Matsuda Jinpei" (Japanese: 警察学校編 Wild Police Story CASE.松田陣平)	Nobuharu Kamanaka	N/A	December 4, 2021	–
1030	31	"The Blank Year (Part One)"; Transliteration: "Kūhaku no Ichinen (Zenpen)" (Japanese: 空白の一年(前編))	Masahiro Takada	Nobuo Ōgizawa	December 11, 2021	–
1031	32	"The Blank Year (Part Two)"; Transliteration: "Kūhaku no Ichinen (Kōhen)" (Japanese: 空白の一年(後編))	Minoru Tozawa	Nobuo Ōgizawa	December 18, 2021	–
1032	33	"Mori Ran, the Model"; Transliteration: "Moderu, Mōri Ran" (Japanese: モデル、毛利蘭)	Tsurumi Mukaiyama	Chisato Matsuda	December 25, 2021	–
1033	34	"Taiko Meijin's Shogi Board (Opening Move)"; Transliteration: "Taikō Meijin no Shōgi-ban (Shote-hen)" (Japanese: 太閤名人の将棋盤（初手編）)	Kōichirō Kuroda Yōsuke Fujino	N/A	January 8, 2022	–
1034	35	"Taiko Meijin's Shogi Board (Brilliant Move)"; Transliteration: "Taikō Meijin no Shōgi-ban (Myōshu-hen)" (Japanese: 太閤名人の将棋盤（妙手編）)	Sumito Sasaki	N/A	January 15, 2022	–
1035	36	"Taiko Meijin's Shogi Board (Checkmate)"; Transliteration: "Taikō Meijin no Shōgi-ban (Ōte-hen)" (Japanese: 太閤名人の将棋盤（王手編）)	Akira Yoshimura	N/A	January 22, 2022	–
1036	37	"Whiteout (Part One)"; Transliteration: "Howaito Auto (Zenpen)" (Japanese: ホワイトアウト（前編）)	Masahiro Takada	Akatsuki Yamatoya	January 29, 2022	–
1037	38	"Whiteout (Part Two)"; Transliteration: "Howaito Auto (Kōhen)" (Japanese: ホワイトアウト（後編）)	Minoru Tozawa	Akatsuki Yamatoya	February 5, 2022	–
1038	39	"Police Academy Arc Wild Police Story CASE. Date Wataru"; Transliteration: "Keisatsu Gakkō-hen Wairudo Porīsu Sutōrī Kēsu. Date Wataru" (Japanese: 警察学校編 Wild Police Story CASE.伊達航)	Yasuichirō Yamamoto	N/A	March 12, 2022	–
1039	40	"The Flying Jack-o'-lantern"; Transliteration: "Soratobu Harowin Kabocha" (Japanese: 空飛ぶハロウィンカボチャ)	Tsurumi Mukaiyama	Takahiro Ōkura	April 16, 2022	–

=== Season 32 (2022–23) ===
No. overall	No. in season	Title	Directed by	Written by	Original release date
1040	1	"The Case of Ayumi's Illustrated Diary 2"; Transliteration: "Ayumi no Enikki Jikenbo Tsū" (Japanese: 歩美の絵日記事件簿２)	Kōichirō Kuroda Yōsuke Fujino	Akatsuki Yamatoya	April 23, 2022
1041	2	"The Unstated Alibi"; Transliteration: "Ienai Aribai" (Japanese: 言えないアリバイ)	Masahiro Takada	Nobuo Ōgizawa	April 30, 2022
1042	3	"Police Academy Arc Wild Police Story CASE. Kenji Hagiwara"; Transliteration: "Keisatsu Gakkō-hen Wairudo Porīsu Sutōrī Kēsu. Hagiwara Kenji" (Japanese: 警察学校編 Wild Police Story CASE.萩原研二)	Nobuharu Kamanaka	N/A	May 7, 2022
1043	4	"The Figure of Revenge"; Transliteration: "Fukushū no Figyua" (Japanese: 復讐のフィギュア)	Minoru Tozawa	Yoshiko Ogata Yueko Keyaki	May 14, 2022
1044	5	"The Deadly Pork Soup Signal"; Transliteration: "Tonjiru wa Inochigake no Aizu" (Japanese: 豚汁は命がけの合図)	Sumito Sasaki	Akatsuki Yamatoya	May 21, 2022
1045	6	"The Birthday Party of Divine Punishment (Part 1)"; Transliteration: "Tenbatsu Kudaru Tanjō Pātī (Zenpen)" (Japanese: 天罰くだる誕生パーティー（前編）)	Tsurumi Mukaiyama	N/A	June 4, 2022
1046	7	"The Birthday Party of Divine Punishment (Part 2)"; Transliteration: "Tenbatsu Kudaru Tanjō Pātī (Kōhen)" (Japanese: 天罰くだる誕生パーティー（後編）)	Akira Yoshimura	N/A	June 11, 2022
1047	8	"The Red Sheep's Eerie Game (Part 1)"; Transliteration: "Akai Hitsuji no Bukimina Gēmu (Zenpen)" (Japanese: 赤いヒツジの不気味なゲーム（前編）)	Yōsuke Fujino	Toshimichi Ōkawa	June 18, 2022
1048	9	"The Red Sheep's Eerie Game (Part 2)"; Transliteration: "Akai Hitsuji no Bukimina Gēmu (Kōhen)" (Japanese: 赤いヒツジの不気味なゲーム（後編）)	Masahiro Takada	Toshimichi Ōkawa	June 25, 2022
1049	10	"The Threat to Megure's Police Career"; Transliteration: "Megure, Keiji Jinsei no Kiki" (Japanese: 目暮、刑事人生の危機)	Sumito Sasaki	Nobuo Ōgizawa	July 9, 2022
1050	11	"Intrigue at Morikawa Mansion (Part 1)"; Transliteration: "Morikawa Goten no Inbō (Zenpen)" (Japanese: 森川御殿の陰謀（前編）)	Minoru Tozawa	Akatsuki Yamatoya	July 16, 2022
1051	12	"Intrigue at Morikawa Mansion (Part 2)"; Transliteration: "Morikawa Goten no Inbō (Kōhen)" (Japanese: 森川御殿の陰謀（後編）)	Yōsuke Fujino	Akatsuki Yamatoya	July 23, 2022
1052	13	"The Detective Boys' Test of Courage"; Transliteration: "Shōnen Tantei-dan no Kan Tameshi" (Japanese: 少年探偵団の肝試し)	Kōichirō Kuroda	Tatsurō Inamoto	July 30, 2022
1053	14	"The Spark That Fell on the Ranch (Part 1)"; Transliteration: "Bokujō ni Ochita Hidane (Zenpen)" (Japanese: 牧場に墜ちた火種（前編）)	Tsurumi Mukaiyama	N/A	August 6, 2022
1054	15	"The Spark That Fell on the Ranch (Part 2)"; Transliteration: "Bokujō ni Ochita Hidane (Kōhen)" (Japanese: 牧場に墜ちた火種（後編）)	Kitagojo	N/A	August 13, 2022
1055	16	"The Ghost's Revenge"; Transliteration: "Yūrei ni Natte Fukushū o" (Japanese: 幽霊になって復讐を)	Masahiro Takada	Nobuo Ōgizawa	September 3, 2022
1056	17	"Wanting to Bring That Person Back"; Transliteration: "Ano Hito o Torimodoshitai" (Japanese: あの人を取り戻したい)	Sumito Sasaki	Nobuo Ōgizawa	September 17, 2022
1057	18	"Bad Guys"; Transliteration: "Warui Yatsura" (Japanese: わるいやつら)	Minoru Tozawa	Yoshio Urasawa	September 24, 2022
1058	19	"The Man Who Camped Out at the Police Station"; Transliteration: "Keisatsu ni Isuwatta Otoko" (Japanese: 警察に居座った男)	Yōsuke Fujino	Nobuo Ōgizawa	October 1, 2022
1059	20	"Yoko Okino and the Locked Attic (Part 1)"; Transliteration: "Okino Yōko to Yaneura no Misshitsu (Zenpen)" (Japanese: 沖野ヨーコと屋根裏の密室(前編))	Tsurumi Mukaiyama	N/A	October 8, 2022
1060	21	"Yoko Okino and the Locked Attic (Part 2)"; Transliteration: "Okino Yōko to Yaneura no Misshitsu (Kōhen)" (Japanese: 沖野ヨーコと屋根裏の密室(後編))	Akira Yoshimura	N/A	October 15, 2022
1061	22	"Police Academy Arc Wild Police Story CASE. Hiromitsu Morofushi"; Transliteration: "Keisatsu Gakkō-hen Wairudo Porīsu Sutōrī Kēsu. Morofushi Hiromitsu" (Japanese: 警察学校編 Wild Police Story CASE. 諸伏景光)	Yasuichirō Yamamoto	N/A	October 29, 2022
1062	23	"The Spiral of Rain and Malice"; Transliteration: "Ame to Akui no Supairaru" (Japanese: 雨と悪意のスパイラル)	Masahiro Takada	Jun'ichi Miyashita	November 5, 2022
1063	24	"The Targeted Chicken Sexer " Transliteration: "Nerawa Reta Hiyoko Kantei-shi" (Japanese: 狙われたひよこ鑑定士)	Minoru Tozawa	Akatsuki Yamatoya	November 12, 2022
1064	25	"The Dreamy-Eyed Woman's Last Shot at Love"; Transliteration: "Yumemiru Kifujin, Saigo no Koi" (Japanese: 夢見る貴婦人、最後の恋)	Kōichirō Kuroda	Tatsurō Inamoto	November 19, 2022
1065	26	"Detectives Don't Sleep"; Transliteration: "Tantei wa Nemuranai" (Japanese: 探偵は眠らない)	Tsurumi Mukaiyama	Nobuo Ōgizawa	November 26, 2022
1066	27	"Till Death Do Us Part"; Transliteration: "Shi ga Futari o Wakatsu Made" (Japanese: 死が二人を分かつまで)	Akira Yoshimura	Akatsuki Yamatoya	December 3, 2022
1067	28	"The Shopping Center in Love"; Transliteration: "Koisuru Shōten Machi" (Japanese: 恋する商店街)	Taiki Nishimura	Yoshio Urasawa	December 24, 2022
1068	29	"Mitsuhiko Tsuburaya's Detective Notes"; Transliteration: "Tsuburaya Mitsuhiko no Tantei Nōto" (Japanese: 円谷光彦の探偵ノート)	Yōsuke Fujino	Chisato Matsuda	January 7, 2023
1069	30	"The Sweet Voice Heard Through the Phone"; Transliteration: "Juwaki Goshi no Suīto Boisu" (Japanese: 受話器ごしのスウィートボイス)	Tsurumi Mukaiyama	Toshimichi Ōkawa	January 14, 2023
1070	31	"The Surprise That Leads to Tragedy"; Transliteration: "Sapuraizu wa Higeki no Hajimari" (Japanese: サプライズは悲劇のはじまり)	Akira Yoshimura	Tatsurō Inamoto	January 21, 2023
1071	32	"Yusaku Kudo's Detective Show (Part 1)"; Transliteration: "Kudō Yūsaku no Suiri Shō (Zenpen)" (Japanese: 工藤優作の推理ショー（前編）)	Masahiro Takada	N/A	January 28, 2023
1072	33	"Yusaku Kudo's Detective Show (Part 2)"; Transliteration: "Kudō Yūsaku no Suiri Shō (Kōhen)" (Japanese: 工藤優作の推理ショー（後編）)	Minoru Tozawa	N/A	February 4, 2023
1073	34	"The Detective Boys' Pursuit of the Purse-snatcher"; Transliteration: "Tantei-dan no Hittakuri dai Tsuiseki" (Japanese: 探偵団の引ったくり大追跡)	Masahiro Takada	Nobuo Ōgizawa	February 11, 2023
1074	35	"The Boiled Fugu Mystery Tour Showdown (Mojiko & Kokura Part)"; Transliteration: "Tetchiri Taiketsu Misuterī Tsuā (Monjikō Kokura-hen)" (Japanese: てっちり対決ミステリーツアー（門司港・小倉編）)	Minoru Tozawa	Akatsuki Yamatoya	February 18, 2023
1075	36	"The Boiled Fugu Mystery Tour Showdown (Shimonoseki Part)"; Transliteration: "Tetchiri Taiketsu Misuterī Tsuā (Shimonoseki-hen)" (Japanese: てっちり対決ミステリーツアー（下関編）)	Yōsuke Fujino	Akatsuki Yamatoya	February 25, 2023
1076	37	"The Charismatic CEO's Secret Plan"; Transliteration: "Karisuma Shachō no Gokuhi Keikaku" (Japanese: カリスマ社長の極秘計画)	Tsurumi Mukaiyama	Nobuo Ōgizawa	March 4, 2023
SP (Note: Even though all previous episodes from Police Academy Arc Wild Police Story were officially included in total episode count, this episode was skipped and is therefore regarded as a special.)	38	"Police Academy Arc Wild Police Story CASE. Rei Furuya"; Transliteration: "Keisatsu Gakkō-hen Wairudo Porīsu Sutōrī Kēsu. Furuya Rei" (Japanese: 警察学校編 Wild Police Story CASE. 降谷零)	Yasuichirō Yamamoto	N/A	March 11, 2023
1077	39	"The Black Organization's Scheme (Hunt)"; Transliteration: "Kuro-zukume no Bōryaku (Kari)" (Japanese: 黒ずくめの謀略（狩り）)	Minoru Tozawa	N/A	March 25, 2023
1078	40	"The Black Organization's Scheme (Landing)"; Transliteration: "Kuro-zukume no Bōryaku (Jōriku)" (Japanese: 黒ずくめの謀略（上陸）)	Nobuharu Kamanaka	N/A	April 1, 2023
1079	41	"The Black Organization's Scheme (Identity)"; Transliteration: "Kuro-zukume no Bōryaku (Shōtai)" (Japanese: 黒ずくめの謀略（正体）)	Yasuichirō Yamamoto	N/A	April 8, 2023

=== Season 33 (2023–present) ===
List of Case Closed episodes
- Season 33
- No. of episodes: 141

Release
- Original network: NNS (ytv)
- Original release: April 15, 2023 – present

Season chronology
- ← Previous; Season 32 Next → Season 32

The thirty-third season of the Case Closed anime was directed by Yasuichirō Yamamoto and Nobuharu Kamanaka, and produced by TMS Entertainment and Yomiuri Telecasting Corporation. The series is based on Gosho Aoyama's Case Closed manga series. In Japan, the series is titled Meitantei Conan (名探偵コナン, lit. Great Detective Conan, officially translated as Detective Conan) but was changed due to legal issues with the title Detective Conan. The series focuses on the adventures of teenage detective Shinichi Kudo who was turned into a child by a poison called APTX 4869, but continues working as a detective under the alias Conan Edogawa.

The episodes use eleven pieces of theme music: six openings and eight endings. The first ending theme is Kuufuku (starring VALSHE) (クウフク, Kuufuku) by Konya, Anomachikara used for episodes 1074–1087. The first opening theme is RAISE INSIGHT by WANDS used for episodes 1077–1101. The second ending theme is ...and Rescue Me by Rainy。 used for episode 1088–1104. The second opening theme is Unraveling Love ~Sukoshi no Yūki~ (Unraveling Love～少しの勇気～; lit. Unraveling Love ~A Little Courage~) by Mai Kuraki used for episodes 1102–1147. The third ending theme is You & I by Mai Kuraki used for episodes 1105–1131. The fourth ending theme is Yume de Aimashō (夢で逢いましょう; lit. "Let's Meet in Our Dreams") by SARD UNDERGROUND used for episodes 1132–1147. The third opening theme is But No Love (But ノーラヴ) by Rainy。used from episodes 1148–1167. The fourth opening theme is titled Poker Face by Amyuri, used from episodes 1168–1186. The fifth ending theme is Shooting Star by WANDS used for episodes 1148–1157. The sixth ending theme is Fun! Fun! Fun! by Leon Niihama used from episodes 1158–1186. For episode 1187, the special opening theme was titled Mune ga Doki Doki by The High-Lows while the special ending theme was titled Step by Step by Ziggy. The fifth opening theme is titled Heaven Knows, by B'z used from episodes 1188–1205. The seventh ending theme is titled TOWA ~Towa ni Kaze ni Noru~ by Mai Kuraki used from episodes 1188–1202. From episode 1203 onwards, the ending theme is titled 7 Days by Rainy。. From episode 1206 onwards, the opening theme is titled Ai no Fire by Leon Niihama.

The season has been airing since April 15, 2023, on Yomiuri TV, Nippon Television and other NNS stations in Japan. Crunchyroll began simulcasting the series in October 2014, starting with episode 754. In February 2023, episodes of the anime appeared on Tubi with an English dub, starting at episode 965. This is the first time since 2010 that any episodes of the main anime series have been dubbed and released in English.

== Episode list ==
<onlyinclude>

No. overall	No. in season	Title	Directed by	Written by	Original release date
1080	1	"The Cameras Targeting Haibara"; Transliteration: "Haihara o Nerau Kamera" (Japanese: 灰原を狙うカメラ)	Taiki Nishimura	Takeharu Sakurai	April 15, 2023
1081	2	"My Beloved Dog Pan-kun is a Good Boy"; Transliteration: "Aiken Pan-kun wa Orikō-san" (Japanese: 愛犬パン君はおりこうさん)	Akira Yoshimura	Akatsuki Yamatoya	April 22, 2023
1082	3	"The Alley of Sad Betrayal"; Transliteration: "Kanashimi no Uragiri Yokochō" (Japanese: 哀しみの裏切り横丁)	Tsurumi Mukaiyama	Asami Ishikawa	April 29, 2023
1083	4	"Behind the Scenes of the J League Finals"; Transliteration: "J Rīgu Kessen no Butaiura" (Japanese: Jリーグ決戦の舞台裏)	Minoru Tozawa	Akatsuki Yamatoya	May 13, 2023
1084	5	"The Freezing Cold Men"; Transliteration: "Hie Kitta Otokotachi" (Japanese: 冷え切った男達)	Yōsuke Fujino	Tatsurō Inamoto	May 20, 2023
1085	6	"The Unlucky Matchmaking (Part 1)"; Transliteration: "Fukitsuna Enmusubi (Zenpen)" (Japanese: 不吉な縁結び（前編）)	Taiki Nishimura	N/A	June 3, 2023
1086	7	"The Unlucky Matchmaking (Part 2)"; Transliteration: "Fukitsuna Enmusubi (Kōhen)" (Japanese: 不吉な縁結び（後編）)	Tsurumi Mukaiyama	N/A	June 10, 2023
1087	8	"The Case of Ayumi's Illustrated Diary 3"; Transliteration: "Ayumi no Enikki Jikenbo Surī" (Japanese: 歩美の絵日記事件簿３)	Yasuichirō Yamamoto	Akatsuki Yamatoya	June 17, 2023
1088	9	"The Unfortunate and Suspicious Victim"; Transliteration: "Fūn de Fushin'na Higaisha" (Japanese: 不運で不審な被害者)	Minoru Tozawa	Nobuo Ōgizawa	June 24, 2023
1089	10	"The Genius Restaurant"; Transliteration: "Tensai Resutoran" (Japanese: 天才レストラン)	Akira Yoshimura	Yoshio Urasawa	July 8, 2023
1090	11	"The Culprit Who Disappeared Into the Sleeping Town"; Transliteration: "Nemureru Machi ni Kieta Hannin" (Japanese: 眠れる街に消えた犯人)	Yōsuke Fujino	Tatsurō Inamoto	July 15, 2023
1091	12	"Girls Day Mystery"; Transliteration: "Joshikai Misuterī" (Japanese: 女子会ミステリー)	Tsurumi Mukaiyama	Akatsuki Yamatoya	July 22, 2023
1092	13	"Stakeout 2"; Transliteration: "Harikomi Tsū" (Japanese: 張り込み２)	Minoru Tozawa	Nobuo Ōgizawa	July 29, 2023
1093	14	"Akemi Miyano's Time Capsule (Part 1)"; Transliteration: "Miyano Akemi no Taimu Kapuseru (Zenpen)" (Japanese: 宮野明美のタイムカプセル（前編）)	Nobuharu Kamanaka	N/A	August 5, 2023
1094	15	"Akemi Miyano's Time Capsule (Part 2)"; Transliteration: "Miyano Akemi no Taimu Kapuseru (Kōhen)" (Japanese: 宮野明美のタイムカプセル（前編）)	Nobuharu Kamanaka	N/A	August 12, 2023
1095	16	"The Missing Man's Dream"; Transliteration: "Kieta Otoko no Yume" (Japanese: 消えた男の夢)	Yōsuke Fujino	Akatsuki Yamatoya	September 2, 2023
1096	17	"Mitsuhiko Tsuburaya's Detective Notes 2"; Transliteration: "Tsuburaya Mitsuhiko no Tantei Nōto Tsū" (Japanese: 円谷光彦の探偵ノート２)	Tsurumi Mukaiyama	Chisato Matsuda	September 9, 2023
1097	18	"Did I Do It?"; Transliteration: "Watashi ga Yarimashita ka?" (Japanese: 私がやりましたか？)	Minoru Tozawa	Tatsurō Inamoto	September 16, 2023
1098	19	"Chihaya Hagiwara, Goddess of the Wind (Part 1)"; Transliteration: "Kaze no Megami Hagiwara Chihaya (Zenpen)" (Japanese: 風の女神・萩原千速 （前編）)	Akira Yoshimura	N/A	September 23, 2023
1099	20	"Chihaya Hagiwara, Goddess of the Wind (Part 2)"; Transliteration: "Kaze no Megami Hagiwara Chihaya (Kōhen)" (Japanese: 風の女神・萩原千速 （後編）)	Masahiro Takada	Akatsuki Yamatoya	September 30, 2023
1100	21	"The Troublesome 20 Million Yen"; Transliteration: "Giwaku no Nisenman-en" (Japanese: 疑惑の２０００万円)	Yōsuke Fujino	Akatsuki Yamatoya	October 14, 2023
1101	22	"Pride of the Immortal Man"; Transliteration: "Fujimi Otoko no Puraido" (Japanese: 不死身男のプライド)	Tsurumi Mukaiyama	Nobuo Ōgizawa	October 21, 2023
1102	23	"The Akabeko and the Three Lucky Men"; Transliteration: "Akabeko to San'nin no Fukuotoko" (Japanese: 赤べこと３人の福男)	Minoru Tozawa	Akatsuki Yamatoya	November 4, 2023
1103	24	"The Teen Novel That Smells Like Guilt"; Transliteration: "Seishun Shōsetsu ni Tsumi no Nioi" (Japanese: 青春小説に罪の匂い)	Masahiro Takada	Hiro Masaki	November 11, 2023
1104	25	"The Real Culprit is on The Run"; Transliteration: "Shinhan'nin wa Tōsō-chū" (Japanese: 真犯人は逃走中)	Yōsuke Fujino	Yūki Nōtsuka	November 18, 2023
1105	26	"Kid vs. Amuro: The Queen's Bangs (Part 1)"; Transliteration: "Kiddo Vāsasu Amuro Kuīnzu Bangu (Zenpen)" (Japanese: キッドＶＳ安室 王妃の前髪(クイーンズ・バング)（前編）)	Nobuharu Kamanaka	N/A	December 2, 2023
1106	27	"Kid vs. Amuro: The Queen's Bangs (Part 2)"; Transliteration: "Kiddo Vāsasu Amuro Kuīnzu Bangu (Kōhen)" (Japanese: キッドＶＳ安室 王妃の前髪(クイーンズ・バング)（後編）)	Nobuharu Kamanaka	N/A	December 9, 2023
1107	28	"I Was Set Up"; Transliteration: "Hamerareta no wa Watashi" (Japanese: ハメられたのは私)	Tsurumi Mukaiyama	Nobuo Ōgizawa	December 16, 2023
1108	29	"The Secret Hidden By the Cards"; Transliteration: "Kādo ni Fusera Reta Himitsu" (Japanese: カードに伏せられた秘密)	Minoru Tozawa	Tatsurō Inamoto	December 23, 2023
1109	30	"Takagi and Date and the Notebook Promise (Part 1)"; Transliteration: "Takagi to Date to Techō no Yakusoku (Zenpen)" (Japanese: 高木と伊達と手帳の約束（前編）)	Akira Yoshimura	N/A	January 6, 2024
1110	31	"Takagi and Date and the Notebook Promise (Part 2)"; Transliteration: "Takagi to Date to Techō no Yakusoku (Kōhen)" (Japanese: 高木と伊達と手帳の約束（後編）)	Masahiro Takada	N/A	January 13, 2024
1111	32	"Rube Goldberg Machine (Part 1)"; Transliteration: "Rūbu Gōrudobāgu Mashin (Zenpen)" (Japanese: ルーブ・ゴールドバーグマシン（前編）)	Yōsuke Fujino	Akatsuki Yamatoya	January 20, 2024
1112	33	"Rube Goldberg Machine (Part 2)"; Transliteration: "Rūbu Gōrudobāgu Mashin (Kōhen)" (Japanese: ルーブ・ゴールドバーグマシン（後編）)	Tsurumi Mukaiyama	Akatsuki Yamatoya	January 27, 2024
1113	34	"Last Dinner for You"; Transliteration: "Rasuto Dinā o Anata ni" (Japanese: ラスト・ディナーをあなたに)	Minoru Tozawa	Hiro Masaki	February 3, 2024
1114	35	"The Holed-Up Sensation"; Transliteration: "O Sawagasena Rōjō" (Japanese: お騒がせな籠城)	Yōsuke Fujino	Nobuo Ōgizawa	February 10, 2024
1115	36	"Chihaya and Jugo's Matchmaking Party (Part 1)"; Transliteration: "Chihaya to Jūgo no Kon Katsu Pātī (Zenpen)" (Japanese: 千速と重悟の婚活パーティー（前編）)	Akira Yoshimura	N/A	March 2, 2024
1116	37	"Chihaya and Jugo's Matchmaking Party (Part 2)"; Transliteration: "Chihaya to Jūgo no Kon Katsu Pātī (Kōhen)" (Japanese: 千速と重悟の婚活パーティー（後編）)	Minoru Tozawa	N/A	March 9, 2024
1117	38	"Karate Teacher, Ran Mouri"; Transliteration: "Karate no Sensei, Mōri Ran" (Japanese: 空手の先生、毛利蘭)	Masahiro Takada	Chisato Matsuda	March 16, 2024
1118	39	"Girls Day Mystery 2"; Transliteration: "Joshikai Misuterī Tsū" (Japanese: 女子会ミステリー２)	Tsurumi Mukaiyama	Akatsuki Yamatoya	March 23, 2024
1119	40	"The Four-Person Class Reunion"; Transliteration: "Yonin Dake no Dōsōkai" (Japanese: ４人だけの同窓会)	Yōsuke Fujino	Yoshio Urasawa	April 6, 2024
1120	41	"Mystery of the Lost Treasure"; Transliteration: "Ushinawareta Otakara Misuterī" (Japanese: 失われたお宝ミステリー)	Nobuharu Kamanaka	Takahiro Ōkura	April 13, 2024
1121	42	"The Dangerous Melon Field"; Transliteration: "Abuna Sugiru Meron Batake" (Japanese: あぶなすぎるメロン畑)	Minoru Tozawa	Akatsuki Yamatoya	April 27, 2024
1122	43	"Stakeout 3"; Transliteration: "Harikomi Surī" (Japanese: 張り込み３)	Masahiro Takada	Tatsurō Inamoto	May 4, 2024
1123	44	"The Body on the Gunma-Nagano Border (Part 1)"; Transliteration: "Gunma to Nagano Bōdā no Itai (Zenpen)" (Japanese: 群馬と長野 県境(ボーダー)の遺体（前編）)	Tsurumi Mukaiyama	N/A	May 11, 2024
1124	45	"The Body on the Gunma-Nagano Border (Part 2)"; Transliteration: "Gunma to Nagano Bōdā no Itai (Kōhen)" (Japanese: 群馬と長野 県境(ボーダー)の遺体（後編）)	Nobuharu Kamanaka	N/A	May 18, 2024
1125	46	"The Case of Ayumi's Illustrated Diary 4"; Transliteration: "Ayumi no Enikki Jikenbo Fō" (Japanese: 歩美の絵日記事件簿４)	Akira Yoshimura	Akatsuki Yamatoya	June 1, 2024
1126	47	"The Detective Who Lost His Mind"; Transliteration: "Nobose Agatta Tantei" (Japanese: 逆上せあがった探偵)	Yōsuke Fujino	Yoshio Urasawa	June 8, 2024
1127	48	"The Interrogation Room 2"; Transliteration: "Za・Torishirabeshitsu Tsū" (Japanese: ザ・取調室２)	Minoru Tozawa	Nobuo Ōgizawa	June 15, 2024
1128	49	"Conan and Megure's Two Hostages (Part 1)"; Transliteration: "Konan to Megure Futari no Hitojichi (Zenpen)" (Japanese: コナンと目暮 ２人の人質（前編）)	Masahiro Takada	Akatsuki Yamatoya	June 22, 2024
1129	50	"Conan and Megure's Two Hostages (Part 2)"; Transliteration: "Konan to Megure Futari no Hitojichi (Kōhen)" (Japanese: コナンと目暮 ２人の人質（後編）)	Tsurumi Mukaiyama	Akatsuki Yamatoya	June 29, 2024
1130	51	"Infidelity Concerns of Triple Collaboration (Part 1)"; Transliteration: "Toripuru Korabo no Uwaki Giwaku (Zenpen)" (Japanese: トリプルコラボの浮気疑惑（前編）)	Ayumi Iemura	N/A	July 20, 2024
1131	52	"Infidelity Concerns of Triple Collaboration (Part 2)"; Transliteration: "Toripuru Korabo no Uwaki Giwaku (Kōhen)" (Japanese: トリプルコラボの浮気疑惑（後編）)	Yōsuke Fujino	N/A	August 3, 2024
1132	53	"Mitsuhiko Tsuburaya's Detective Notes 3"; Transliteration: "Tsuburaya Mitsuhiko no Tantei Nōto Surī" (Japanese: 円谷光彦の探偵ノート３)	Minoru Tozawa	Chisato Matsuda	August 17, 2024
1133	54	"Best Husband"; Transliteration: "Besuto Hazubando" (Japanese: ベストハズバンド)	Masahiro Takada	Tatsurō Inamoto	August 24, 2024
1134	55	"Misfortune of A Positive Man"; Transliteration: "Pojitibu Otoko no Sainan" (Japanese: ポジティブ男の災難)	Yoshitsugu Kimura	Nobuo Ōgizawa	September 14, 2024
1135	56	"Momiji Ooka's Sweet Trap (Part 1)"; Transliteration: "Ōoka Momiji no Amai Wana (Zenpen)" (Japanese: 大岡紅葉の甘い罠（前編）)	Tsurumi Mukaiyama	N/A	September 21, 2024
1136	57	"Momiji Ooka's Sweet Trap (Part 2)"; Transliteration: "Ōoka Momiji no Amai Wana (Kōhen)" (Japanese: 大岡紅葉の甘い罠（後編）)	Ayumi Iemura	N/A	September 28, 2024
1137	58	"The Secret of the Popular Restaurant's Changing Flavor"; Transliteration: "Gyōretsu-ten, Aji hen no Himitsu" (Japanese: 行列店、味変の秘密)	Minoru Tozawa	Tatsurō Inamoto	October 5, 2024
1138	59	"The Moving Police Box"; Transliteration: "Ugoku Kōban" (Japanese: 動く交番)	Yōsuke Fujino	Yasutoshi Murakawa	October 12, 2024
1139	60	"The Sister Troubled By Her Naughty Brother"; Transliteration: "Ijiwaruna Otōto ni Komaru ane" (Japanese: 意地悪な弟に困る姉)	Yūdai Takamoto	Nobuo Ōgizawa	October 19, 2024
1140	61	"Girls Day Mystery 3"; Transliteration: "Joshikai Misuterī Surī" (Japanese: 女子会ミステリー３)	Masahiro Takada	Akatsuki Yamatoya	November 2, 2024
1141	62	"The Mouri Family House Sits"; Transliteration: "Orusuban Mōri Ikka" (Japanese: お留守番毛利一家)	Taiki Nishimura	Nobuo Ōgizawa	November 9, 2024
1142	63	"The Rampo Mansion Murder Case (Part 1)"; Transliteration: "Ranpo-tei Satsujin Jiken (Zenpen)" (Japanese: 乱歩邸殺人事件（前編）)	Tsurumi Mukaiyama	Takahiro Ōkura	November 16, 2024
1143	64	"The Rampo Mansion Murder Case (Part 2)"; Transliteration: "Ranpo-tei Satsujin Jiken (Kōhen)" (Japanese: 乱歩邸殺人事件（後編）)	Minoru Tozawa	Takahiro Ōkura	November 23, 2024
1144	65	"Hotel Serial Bombing Case (Part 1)"; Transliteration: "Hoteru Renzoku Bakuha Jiken (Zenpen)" (Japanese: ホテル連続爆破事件（前編）)	Akira Yoshimura	N/A	December 7, 2024
1145	66	"Hotel Serial Bombing Case (Part 2)"; Transliteration: "Hoteru Renzoku Bakuha Jiken (Kōhen)" (Japanese: ホテル連続爆破事件（後編）)	Ayumi Iemura	N/A	December 14, 2024
1146	67	"The Whistling Bookstore 4"; Transliteration: "Kiteki no Kikoeru Kosho-ten Fō" (Japanese: 汽笛の聞こえる古書店４)	Akira Yoshimura	Yūki Nōtsuka	December 21, 2024
1147	68	"Stakeout 4"; Transliteration: "Harikomi Fō" (Japanese: 張り込み４)	Yōsuke Fujino	Toshimichi Ōkawa	December 28, 2024
1148	69	"The Detective Boys and the Two Leaders (Part 1)"; Transliteration: "Tantei-dan to Futari no Insotsu-sha (Zenpen)" (Japanese: 探偵団と二人の引率者（前編）)	Masahiro Takada	N/A	January 4, 2025
1149	70	"The Detective Boys and the Two Leaders (Part 2)"; Transliteration: "Tantei-dan to Futari no Insotsu-sha (Kōhen)" (Japanese: 探偵団と二人の引率者（後編）)	Tsurumi Mukaiyama	N/A	January 11, 2025
1150	71	"Kaito Kid and the Magic Crown (Part 1)"; Transliteration: "Kaitō Kiddo to Ōkan Majikku (Zenpen)" (Japanese: 怪盗キッドと王冠マジック（前編）)	Minoru Tozawa	N/A	January 18, 2025
1151	72	"Kaito Kid and the Magic Crown (Part 2)"; Transliteration: "Kaitō Kiddo to Ōkan Majikku (Kōhen)" (Japanese: 怪盗キッドと王冠マジック（後編）)	Yoshitsugu Kimura	N/A	January 25, 2025
1152	73	"Last Dance"; Transliteration: "Rasuto Dansu" (Japanese: ラストダンス)	Masahiko Suzuki	Yūki Nōtsuka	February 8, 2025
1153	74	"The Yamahime of Yakushima (Part 1)"; Transliteration: "Yakushima no Yamahime (Zenpen)" (Japanese: 屋久島の山姫（前編）)	Hiroyuki Okuno	Akatsuki Yamatoya	February 15, 2025
1154	75	"The Yamahime of Yakushima (Part 2)"; Transliteration: "Yakushima no Yamahime (Kōhen)" (Japanese: 屋久島の山姫（後編）)	Yūki Kawakata	Akatsuki Yamatoya	February 22, 2025
1155	76	"Follow Them! Detective Taxi 2"; Transliteration: "Tsuiseki! Tantei Takushī Tsū" (Japanese: 追跡！ 探偵タクシー２)	Hiroaki Takagi	Yoshio Urasawa	March 1, 2025
1156	77	"The Ishikawa Yorumasshi Mystery (Part 1)"; Transliteration: "Ishikawa Yorumasshi Misuterī (Zenpen)" (Japanese: 石川よるまっしミステリー（前編）)	Akira Yoshimura	Toshimichi Ōkawa	March 8, 2025
1157	78	"The Ishikawa Yorumasshi Mystery (Part 2)"; Transliteration: "Ishikawa Yorumasshi Misuterī (Kōhen)" (Japanese: 石川よるまっしミステリー（後編）)	Masahiro Takada	Toshimichi Ōkawa	March 15, 2025
1158	79	"The Detective Boys and Their Beloved Old House"; Transliteration: "Tantei-dan to Akogareno ko Minka" (Japanese: 探偵団と憧れの古民家)	Taiki Nishimura	Chisato Matsuda	April 12, 2025
1159	80	"The Whereabouts of the Goodbye"; Transliteration: "Sayonara no Yukue" (Japanese: サヨナラの行方)	Tsurumi Mukaiyama	Nobuo Ōgizawa	April 19, 2025
1160	81	"When the Shishi-odoshi Resonates"; Transliteration: "Shishi-odoshi ga Hibiku Toki" (Japanese: 鹿威しが響く刻)	Yūki Kawakata	Akatsuki Yamatoya	April 26, 2025
1161	82	"The Secret's Afterimage"; Transliteration: "Himitsu no Zanzō" (Japanese: 秘密の残像)	Minoru Tozawa	Takeharu Sakurai	May 3, 2025
1162	83	"The Case of Ayumi's Illustrated Diary 5"; Transliteration: "Ayumi no Enikki Jikenbo Faibu" (Japanese: 歩美の絵日記事件簿５)	Akira Yoshimura	Akatsuki Yamatoya	May 10, 2025
1163	84	"The Counting Song Heard in the Dark"; Transliteration: "Yami ni Kikoeru Kazoeuta" (Japanese: 闇に聞こえる数え歌)	Minoru Tozawa	Yasutoshi Murakawa	May 17, 2025
1164	85	"The 17-Year-Old Truth (The Bloody Knight)"; Transliteration: "Jūnana-nen Mae no Shinsō Chizome no Naito" (Japanese: 17年前の真相 血染めの騎士(ナイト))	Masahiro Takada	N/A	June 7, 2025
1165	86	"The 17-Year-Old Truth (The Perceptive Devil)"; Transliteration: "Jūnana-nen Mae no Shinsō-tachi me no Akuma" (Japanese: 17年前の真相 達眼の悪魔)	Ayumi Iemura	N/A	June 14, 2025
1166	87	"The 17-Year-Old Truth (The Watchtower Bishop)"; Transliteration: "Jūnana-nen Mae no Shinsō Tōminokaku Gyō" (Japanese: 17年前の真相 遠見の角行)	Nobuharu Kamanaka	N/A	June 21, 2025
1167	88	"The 17-Year-Old Truth (The Queen's Gambit)"; Transliteration: "Jūnana-nen Mae no Shinsō Kuīnzu Gyanbitto" (Japanese: 17年前の真相 女王の謀(クイーンズ・ギャンビット))	Minoru Tozawa	N/A	June 28, 2025
1168	89	"Genta's Eel Casebook"; Transliteration: "Genta no Unagi Torimonochō" (Japanese: 元太のうなぎ捕物帳)	Tsurumi Mukaiyama	Yūki Nōtsuka	July 19, 2025
1169	90	"The Mystery of the Man-Eating Classroom (Part 1)"; Transliteration: "Hitokui Kyōshitsu no Kai (Zenpen)" (Japanese: 人喰い教室の怪 （前編）)	Yūki Kawakata	N/A	July 26, 2025
1170	91	"The Mystery of the Man-Eating Classroom (Part 2)"; Transliteration: "Hitokui Kyōshitsu no Kai (Kōhen)" (Japanese: 人喰い教室の怪 （後編）)	Masahiro Takada	N/A	August 2, 2025
1171	92	"Why I Became Her Butler (Part 1)"; Transliteration: "Shitsuji ni Natta Riyū (Zenpen)" (Japanese: 執事になった理由 （前編）)	Akira Yoshimura	N/A	August 16, 2025
1172	93	"Why I Became Her Butler (Part 2)"; Transliteration: "Shitsuji ni Natta Riyū (Kōhen)" (Japanese: 執事になった理由 （後編）)	Hiroaki Takagi	N/A	August 23, 2025
1173	94	"It's a Ghost!"; Transliteration: "Obake ga Deta!" (Japanese: オバケが出た！)	Minoru Tozawa	Chisato Matsuda	August 30, 2025
1174	95	"The Glassy Water's Surface (Part 1)"; Transliteration: "Garasu no Minamo (Zenpen)" (Japanese: ガラスの水面（前編）)	Masahiko Suzuki	Akatsuki Yamatoya	September 6, 2025
1175	96	"The Glassy Water's Surface (Part 2)"; Transliteration: "Garasu no Minamo (Kōhen)" (Japanese: ガラスの水面（後編）)	Yoshihiro Sugai	Akatsuki Yamatoya	September 13, 2025
1176	97	"The Hero of Ishinomaki"; Transliteration: "Ishinomaki no Hīrō" (Japanese: 石巻のヒーロー)	Masahiro Takada Yoshitsugu Kimura	Jun'ichi Miyashita	September 20, 2025
1177	98	"Search for the Phantom Giant"; Transliteration: "Maboroshi no Ōotoko o Sagase" (Japanese: 幻の大男を探せ)	Ryōtarō Aoba	Chisato Matsuda	September 27, 2025
1178	99	"The Crimson Skull of Mt. Washio (Part 1)"; Transliteration: "Washio-san no Guren Dokuro (Zenpen)" (Japanese: 鷲雄山の紅蓮髑髏（前編）)	Ayumi Iemura	N/A	October 11, 2025
1179	100	"The Crimson Skull of Mt. Washio (Part 2)"; Transliteration: "Washio-san no Guren Dokuro (Kōhen)" (Japanese: 鷲雄山の紅蓮髑髏（後編）)	Minoru Tozawa	N/A	October 18, 2025
1180	101	"The Lucky Cat Saw Everything"; Transliteration: "Manekineko wa Mite ita" (Japanese: 招き猫は見ていた)	Mao Yingxing	Hiro Masaki	November 1, 2025
1181	102	"Buchi Returns a Favor"; Transliteration: "Buchi no Ongaeshi" (Japanese: ブチの恩返し)	Yūki Kawakata	Nobuo Ōgizawa	November 8, 2025
1182	103	"Arrest That Face"; Transliteration: "Sono Kao o Tsukamaero" (Japanese: その顔を捕まえろ)	Yoshihiro Sugai	Tatsurō Inamoto	November 15, 2025
1183	104	"The Interrogation Room 3"; Transliteration: "Za・Torishirabeshitsu Surī" (Japanese: ザ・取調室３)	Kōta Nakamura	Toshimichi Ōkawa	November 29, 2025
1184	105	"The Red-Brick Warehouse and the Vanishing Kidnapper (Part 1)"; Transliteration: "Akarenga Sōko Kieta Yūkai-han (Zenpen)" (Japanese: 赤レンガ倉庫 消えた誘拐犯（前編）)	Masahiro Takada	N/A	December 6, 2025
1185	106	"The Red-Brick Warehouse and the Vanishing Kidnapper (Part 2)"; Transliteration: "Akarenga Sōko Kieta Yūkai-han (Kōhen)" (Japanese: 赤レンガ倉庫 消えた誘拐犯（後編）)	Ayumi Iemura	N/A	December 13, 2025
1186	107	"Girls Day Mystery 4"; Transliteration: "Joshikai Misuterī Fō" (Japanese: 女子会ミステリー4)	Minoru Tozawa	Akatsuki Yamatoya	December 27, 2025
1187	108	"Episode "ZERO" Kudo Shinichi and the Aquarium Case"; Transliteration: "Episōdo "Zero" Kudō Shin'ichi Suizokukan Jiken" (Japanese: エピソード“ZERO”工藤新一水族館事件)	Yasuichirō Yamamoto	N/A	January 3, 2026
1188	109	"Follow Them! Detective Taxi 3"; Transliteration: "Tsuiseki! Tantei Takushī Surī" (Japanese: 追跡！ 探偵タクシー3)	Hiroaki Takagi	Yoshio Urasawa	January 10, 2026
1189	110	"Double Alibi"; Transliteration: "Daburu・Aribai" (Japanese: W・アリバイ)	Yoshihiro Sugai	Asami Ishikawa	January 17, 2026
1190	111	"The Lover Who Vanished on Pont Koitani (Tottori Tour)"; Transliteration: "Koidanibashi ni Kieta Koibito (Tottori Shūyū-hen)" (Japanese: 恋谷橋に消えた恋人 (鳥取周遊編))	Yūki Kawakata	Kōshirō Mikami	January 24, 2026
1191	112	"The Lover Who Vanished on Pont Koitani (Misasa Arc)"; Transliteration: "Koidanibashi ni Kieta Koibito (Misasa-hen)" (Japanese: 恋谷橋に消えた恋人 (三朝編))	Masahiro Takada	Kōshirō Mikami	January 31, 2026
1192	113	"Mitsuhiko Tsuburaya's Detective Notes 4"; Transliteration: "Tsuburaya Mitsuhiko no Tantei Nōto Fō" (Japanese: 円谷光彦の探偵ノート４)	Hiroyuki Okuno	Chisato Matsuda	March 7, 2026
1193	114	"Kid vs. Hakuba: The Azure Throne (Part 1)"; Transliteration: "Kiddo Vāsasu Hakuba Azūru Surōn (Zenpen)" (Japanese: キッドVS白馬 青の玉座(アズール・スローン)（前編）)	Kōta Nakamura	N/A	March 14, 2026
1194	115	"Kid vs. Hakuba: The Azure Throne (Part 2)"; Transliteration: "Kiddo Vāsasu Hakuba Azūru Surōn (Kōhen)" (Japanese: キッドVS白馬 青の玉座(アズール・スローン)（後編）)	Minoru Tozawa	N/A	March 21, 2026
1195	116	"The Spiral Mansion Mystery (Part 1)"; Transliteration: "Yakata Nisuterī Uzumaki-kan (Zenpen)" (Japanese: 館ミステリー 渦巻館（前編）)	Yūki Kawakata	Hiro Masaki	March 28, 2026
1196	117	"The Spiral Mansion Mystery (Part 2)"; Transliteration: "Yakata Nisuterī Uzumaki-kan (Kōhen)" (Japanese: 館ミステリー 渦巻館（後編）)	Yoshihiro Sugai	Hiro Masaki	April 4, 2026
1197	118	"The Cosplay Rider of the Wind"; Transliteration: "Senpū no Kosupureraidā" (Japanese: 旋風のコスプレライダー)	Masahiro Takada	Takahiro Ōkura	April 11, 2026
1198	119	"Cinderella's Shoe"; Transliteration: "Shinderera no Kutsu" (Japanese: シンデレラの靴)	Minoru Tozawa	Tatsurō Inamoto	April 18, 2026
1199	120	"The Detective Boys VS the Silver Detectives 2"; Transliteration: "Shōnen Tanteidan Vāsasu Shirubā Tanteidan Tsū" (Japanese: 少年探偵団VS老人(シルバー)探偵団２)	Kōta Nakamura	Nobuo Ōgizawa	April 25, 2026
1200	121	"The Porch Pirate Epidemic"; Transliteration: "Okihai Dorobō Tahatsuchū" (Japanese: 置き配泥棒多発中)	Yūki Kawakata	Yūki Nōtsuka	May 2, 2026
1201	122	"I'm the Culprit"; Transliteration: "Watashi ga Hannin Desu" (Japanese: 私が犯人です)	Yoshihiro Sugai	Akatsuki Yamatoya	May 9, 2026
1202	123	"I Cannot Lie to Archery"; Transliteration: "Ācherī ni uso wa Tsukenai" (Japanese: アーチェリーに嘘はつけない)	Masahiro Takada	Yoshio Urasawa	May 30, 2026
SP (Note: Despite this episode being introduced in the international numbering (mainly has to do with copyright-fee settlements), in Japan locally, however, this episode was skipped and is therefore regarded as a special.)	124	"The Gold-Star Answer"; Transliteration: "Hanamaru na Ansā" (Japanese: はなまるな真実(アンサー))	Hiroaki Takagi Minoru Tozawa	Akatsuki Yamatoya	June 6, 2026
1203	125	"Sonoko and Conan's Spooky Story Night"; Transliteration: "Sonoko to Konan no Kaidan Naito" (Japanese: 園子とコナンの怪談ナイト)	Akira Mano	Tatsurō Inamoto	June 13, 2026
1204	126	"Who Kidnapped Conan and Azusa? (Part 1)"; Transliteration: "Konan to Azusa Yūkai Shita no wa Dare? (Zenpen)" (Japanese: コナンと梓 誘拐したのは誰？（前編）)	Minoru Tozawa	N/A	June 20, 2026
1205	127	"Who Kidnapped Conan and Azusa? (Part 2)"; Transliteration: "Konan to Azusa Yūkai Shita no wa Dare? (Kōhen)" (Japanese: コナンと梓 誘拐したのは誰？（後編）)	Yoshihiro Sugai	N/A	June 27, 2026
1206	128	"The Man Who Came Falling Down"; Transliteration: "Korogeochite Kita Otoko" (Japanese: 転げ落ちてきた男)	Yūichi Nobe	Nobuo Ōgizawa	July 11, 2026
1207	129	"The J.League Starting Whistle"; Transliteration: "J Rīgu Kaimaku no Hoissuru" (Japanese: Jリーグ開幕の警笛)	Akira Yoshimura Masahiro Takada	Toshimichi Ōkawa	July 18, 2026
1208	130	"Welcome to the Stone Age Village"; Transliteration: "Oide yo Sekkijin no Sato" (Japanese: おいでよ石器人の里)	Yūki Kawakata	Hiro Masaki	July 25, 2026
1209	131	"Who's the Target?"; Transliteration: "Nerawa Reta no wa Dare?" (Japanese: 狙われたのは誰？)	Chihiro Wada	Tatsurō Inamoto	August 1, 2026
1210	132	"The Cursed Neighbor's House"; Transliteration: "Noroi no Rinka" (Japanese: 呪いの隣家)	Daiki Koyama	Nobuo Ōgizawa	August 22, 2026
1211	133	"Birdman Contest Bombing Case (Part 1)"; Transliteration: "Tori Ningen Kontesuto Bakuha Jiken (Zenpen)" (Japanese: 鳥人間コンテスト爆破事件（前編）)	Yoshihiro Sugai Tsukasa Saitō	Takahiro Ōkura	August 29, 2026
1212	134	"Birdman Contest Bombing Case (Part 2)"; Transliteration: "Tori Ningen Kontesuto Bakuha Jiken (Kōhen)" (Japanese: 鳥人間コンテスト爆破事件（後編）)	Masahiro Takada	Takahiro Ōkura	September 5, 2026
1213	135	"Ran Mouri, The Eyewitness"; Transliteration: "Mokugeki-sha, Moriran" (Japanese: 目撃者、毛利蘭)	Yūki Kawakata	Chisato Matsuda	September 19, 2026
1214	136	"The Crimson Closing Day (Opening Day)"; Transliteration: "Akaneiro no Senshūraku (Shonichi)" (Japanese: 茜色の千秋楽（初日))	Yoshitsugu Kimura	Hiroaki Takagi	September 26, 2026
1215	137	"The Crimson Closing Day (The Penultimate Show)"; Transliteration: "Akaneiro no Senshūraku (Maeraku)" (Japanese: 茜色の千秋楽（前楽))	Minoru Tozawa	Hiroaki Takagi	October 3, 2026
1216	138	"The Crimson Closing Day (The Final Show)"; Transliteration: "Akaneiro no Senshūraku (Ōraku)" (Japanese: 茜色の千秋楽（大楽))	Hiroaki Takagi	Hiroaki Takagi	October 10, 2026
1217	139	"The Hands Pushing Their Back"; Transliteration: "Senaka o Osu te" (Japanese: 背中を押す手)	Yoshihiro Sugai Tsukasa Saitō	Tatsurō Inamoto	October 17, 2026
1218	140	"A Paw-sitively Wonderful Investigation"; Transliteration: "Wandafuru na Sōsa" (Japanese: わんだふるな捜査)	Masahiro Takada	Hiro Masaki	October 31, 2026
1219	141	"The Café of Many Refusals"; Transliteration: "Okotowari no ōi Kissaten" (Japanese: お断りの多い喫茶店)	Chihiro Wada	Nobuo Ōgizawa	November 7, 2026
1220	142	"Girls Day Mystery 5 (Part 1)"; Transliteration: "Onagokai Misuterī Faibu (Zenpen)" (Japanese: 女子会ミステリー５（前編）)	Kōta Nakamura	Akatsuki Yamatoya	November 14, 2026
1221	143	"Girls Day Mystery 5 (Part 2)"; Transliteration: "Onagokai Misuterī Faibu (Kōhen)" (Japanese: 女子会ミステリー５（後編）)	TBA	Akatsuki Yamatoya	November 21, 2026

== Home media release ==
The Region 2 DVD compilations of the Detective Conan anime are released by Shogakukan and grouped by parts.

Shogakukan (Japan, Region 2 DVD)
Volume		Episodes^{Jp.}	Release date	Ref.
Part 31	Volume 1	1000–1002, 1006	February 24, 2023	
Part 31	Volume 2	1003–1005, 1009	April 21, 2023	
Part 31	Volume 3	1007–1008, 1010, 1013	June 23, 2023	
Part 31	Volume 4	1011–1012, 1014–1015	August 25, 2023	
Part 31	Volume 5	1016–1017, 1021–1022	October 27, 2023	
Part 31	Volume 6	1018–1020, 1023	February 23, 2024	
Part 31	Volume 7	1024–1027	April 19, 2024	
Part 31	Volume 8	1028–1031	June 21, 2024	
Part 31	Volume 9	1032–1035	August 23, 2024	
Part 31	Volume 10	1036–1039	October 25, 2024	
