= Detective Conan: Police Academy Arc =

Japanese manga series by Gosho Aoyama and Takahiro Arai

- Detective Conan: Police Academy Arc – Wild Police Story
- First tankōbon volume cover, featuring (clockwise from the bottom) Jinpei Matsuda, Kenji Hagiwara, Wataru Date, Hiromitsu Morofushi and Rei Furuya/Tōru Amuro

名探偵コナン 警察学校編 Wild Police Story (Meitantei Conan Keisatsu Gakkō-hen Wairudo Porisu Sutōrī)
- Genre: Action, crime, mystery
- Manga
- Written by: Gosho Aoyama
- Illustrated by: Takahiro Arai
- Published by: Shogakukan
- Imprint: Shōnen Sunday Comics Special
- Magazine: Weekly Shōnen Sunday
- Original run: October 2, 2019 – November 18, 2020
- Volumes: 2
- Anime television series
- Directed by: Yasuichiro Yamamoto; Nobuharu Kamanaka
- Music by: Katsuo Ōno
- Studio: TMS Entertainment
- Licensed by: Crunchyroll
- Original network: NNS (ytv)
- Original run: December 4, 2021 – March 11, 2023
- Episodes: 5
- icon

Detective Conan: Police Academy Arc – Wild Police Story (Note: Japanese: 名探偵コナン 警察学校編 Wild Police Story, Hepburn: Meitantei Conan Keisatsu Gakkō-hen Wairudo Porisu Sutōrī) is a Japanese manga series written by Gosho Aoyama and illustrated by Takahiro Arai. It is a spin-off and prequel to the Case Closed manga by Gosho Aoyama. It was serialized in Shogakukan's Weekly Shōnen Sunday from October 2019 to November 2020, with its chapters collected in two tankōbon volumes. A five-episode anime television series adaptation produced by TMS Entertainment aired from December 2021 to March 2023.

== Plot ==
Taking place seven years before the main series, the story focuses on the early careers of five Metropolitan Police Academy recruits: Rei Furuya (later known as Tōru Amuro), Jinpei Matsuda, Wataru Date, Hiromitsu Morofushi, and Kenji Hagiwara. Set during their time as cadets, the story depicts their training, interpersonal conflicts, and the experiences that shape them into the officers seen in the original series. Through episodic arcs, Furuya's ambition, Matsuda's complex motives, and the others' backgrounds are explored as they confront physical training challenges, real-world threats such as a convenience store robbery, and the pressures of becoming police officers.

== Characters ==
Rei Furuya / Tōru Amuro (降谷 零 / 安室 透, Furuya Rei / Amuro Tōru)
Voiced by: Tōru Furuya
A law enforcement prospect who entered the police academy with straight A's in all subjects. Because of his serious attitude and his blonde hair, he often gets into trouble with other students. Furuya is the only person alive out of his five colleagues.
Jinpei Matsuda (松田 陣平, Matsuda Jinpei)
Voiced by: Nobutoshi Canna
A trainee who appears to be unpredictable and uncooperative, but his level of academic, practical, and professional knowledge is high. His father, a professional boxer, trained him in boxing. In the main series, Matsuda sacrificed himself on the Ferris Wheel in order to reveal the location where the second bomb is set.
Wataru Date (伊達 航, Date Wataru)
Voiced by: Hiroki Tōchi
The strong, caring leader of the group who has excellent leadership skills. Having seen his father, a former police officer, he believes that strength is necessary for the sake of justice. In the main series, Date died of being hit by a car.
Kenji Hagiwara (萩原 研二, Hagiwara Kenji)
Voiced by: Shin-ichiro Miki
An officer who has excellent insight and communication skills and is popular with females. He and Matsuda have been close friends since elementary school. In the main series, Hagiwara died when trying to disarm a bomb in an apartment complex.
Hiromitsu Morofushi (諸伏 景光, Morofushi Hiromitsu)
Voiced by: Hikaru Midorikawa
A childhood friend of Furuya's. His older brother, Takaaki, is a detective for the Nagano Prefectural Police. He is kind and sincere, and still carries the trauma of the death of his parents. In the main series, Morofushi committed suicide when his identity as a Public Security Bureau officer is exposed and he thought that a Black Organization member was going to come and kill him.

== Media ==
=== Manga ===
Detective Conan: Police Academy Arc – Wild Police Story was written by Gosho Aoyama and illustrated by Takahiro Arai. It ran in Shogakukan's Weekly Shōnen Sunday from October 2, 2019, to November 18, 2020. The series' first arc, the Jinpei Matsuda arc, ran for three chapters in October 2019; a promotional video narrated by Matsuda (Nobutoshi Canna) was released. The second arc, the Wataru Date arc, ran for three chapters in February 2020; a promotional video narrated by Date (Keiji Fujiwara) was released. The third arc, the Kenji Hagiwara arc, ran for three chapters in June 2020; a promotional video narrated by Hagiwara (Shin-ichiro Miki) was released. The fourth and final arc, the Hiromitsu Morofushi arc, ran for four chapters from October to November 2020; a promotional video narrated by Morofushi (Hikaru Midorikawa) was released. Shogakukan collected its chapters in two tankōbon volumes, released on November 18 and December 18, 2020.

==== Volumes ====
| No. | Release date | ISBN |
|---|---|---|
| 1 | November 18, 2020 | 978-4-09-850367-4 |
Case.1 – "A Fight Between Equals" (竜虎相搏, Ryūko Sōhaku); Case.2 – "Outrageous Behavior" (傍若無人, Bōjaku Bujin); Case.3 – "Of One Heart and Mind" (戮力協心, Rikuryoku Kyōshin); Case.4 – "With Fortitude and Vigor" (質実剛健, Shitsujitsu Gōken); Case.5 – "Learning From History" (殷鑑不遠, Inkan Fuen); Case.6 – "Without Reserve" (虚心坦懐, Kyoshin Tankai)
| 2 | December 18, 2020 | 978-4-09-850368-1 |
Case.7 – "Gentle Yet Firm" (外柔内剛, Gaijū Naigō); Case.8 – "Pride Comes Before the Fall" (亢竜有悔, Kōryō Yūkai); Case.9 – "With Lightning Speed" (疾風迅雷, Shippū Jinrai); Case.10 – "You Reap What You Sow" (鳩首凝議, Akuin Akka); Case.11 – "Gathering and Discussing" (殷鑑不遠, Kyūshu Gyōgi); Case.12 – "Cherry Blossom Storm" (桜華爛漫, Sakura Hana Ranman); Case.13 – "The Cherry, the Plum, the Peach, the Damson" (桜梅桃李, Ōbaidōri)

=== Anime ===
On August 3, 2021, it was announced that the manga would receive an anime television series adaptation. It premiered on December 4, 2021, on ytv and Nippon Television. The fifth and last episode aired on March 4, 2023. The anime aired on an irregular broadcast schedule, and is treated as part of the main Case Closed series. Because of this, Crunchyroll licenses the series, as they have continually licensed Case Closed since 2014. It featured the regular opening and ending themes from Case Closed. The first episode uses the opening theme "Yura Yura" by Wands. The second and third episodes use the opening theme "Sleepless" by B'z. The fourth and fifth episodes use the opening theme "Sparkle" by Maki Ohguro. The first and second episodes use the ending theme "Sweet Moonlight" by Breakerz. The third episode uses the ending theme "Karappo no Kokoro" (空っぽの心; lit. "Empty Heart") by Sard Underground. The fourth episode uses the ending theme "Playmaker" (プレイメーカー, Pureimēkā) by All at Once feat. Yudai Ohno (from Da-ice). The fifth episode uses the ending theme "Kuufuku" (クウフク) by Konya, Anomachikara and Valshe.

==== Episodes ====
| No. in WPS | No. overall (Note: Overall episode number in Case Closed anime) | Title (Note: All English titles are taken from Crunchyroll.) | Directed by | Original release date |
|---|---|---|---|---|
| 1 | 1029 | "Police Academy Arc Wild Police Story CASE. Matsuda Jinpei"; Transliteration: "Keisatsu Gakkō-hen Wairudo Porīsu Sutōrī Kēsu. Matsuda Jinpei" (Japanese: 警察学校編 Wild Police Story CASE.松田陣平) | Nobuharu Kamanaka | December 4, 2021 |
It's nighttime at the Metropolitan Police Academy. As the cherry blossoms are falling, the sound of Rei Furuya and Jinpei Matsuda punching each other echoes through the grounds. Matsuda doesn't like Furuya, who "really wants to become a police officer" despite being in the police academy. The two continued to fight without taking a step back. At 2 a.m., Hiromitsu Morofushi wakes up from a nightmare and he hears a knock on his door. He woke up to a knock at the door, and there was Furuya, covered in wounds. Morofushi, who had been watching him, asked, "Do you think you can get along with this person?", Morofushi asked. At the morning assembly, next to the wounded Furuya and Matsuda were their classmates Morofushi, Kenji Hagiwara, and Wataru Date. Onizuka Hatsuzo, the instructor at the Onizuka Training Center, asks the reason for their wounds, but Date tactfully tells a lie. Matsuda, who says he hates the police but is able to answer questions about what it means to be a police officer, is questioned by Hatsuzo, and Furuya begins to investigate his past.
| 2 | 1038 | "Police Academy Arc Wild Police Story CASE. Date Wataru"; Transliteration: "Keisatsu Gakkō-hen Wairudo Porīsu Sutōrī Kēsu. Date Wataru" (Japanese: 警察学校編 Wild Police Story CASE.伊達航) | Yasuichirō Yamamoto | March 12, 2022 |
Furuya and Date fought in an arresting technique class. Date won and asked the defeated Furuya, "Why didn't you exploit your own weakness?" He said, "If you are not stronger than anyone else, you will not be able to carry out justice." Later that night, Furuya was alone in bed thinking about Date's words. Morofushi comes to Furuya's room and tells him that he is going out. Morofushi comes to Furuya's room and asks, "Is there anything you want me to buy for you?" But after a while, he remembered that he was out of toothpaste. He leaves the room to ask for it, but Morofushi, Hagiwara, and Matsuda are already gone, so he decides to go to the convenience store by himself. When Furuya went outside, he found Date there and started talking about past events with his father.
| 3 | 1042 | "Police Academy Arc Wild Police Story CASE. Hagiwara Kenji"; Transliteration: "Keisatsu Gakkō-hen Wairudo Porīsu Sutōrī Kēsu. Hagiwara Kenji" (Japanese: 警察学校編 Wild Police Story CASE.萩原研二) | Nobuharu Kamanaka | May 7, 2022 |
Furuya, Date, Matsuda, and Morofushi are gathered at a party. Date has a girlfriend, but Hagiwara offers to pay for her drinks, so she joins the party as a headcount. Then Hagiwara arrives late, saying that he was late because he was helping his grandmother on the way to the party. The second party is to go to a karaoke bar, but by then Hagiwara is on his own. The next day, while the five of them are cleaning up, an "RX-7FD3S" enters the police academy. Emerging from the car was instructor Onizuka. Hagiwara, who was extremely interested in the car, made an enthusiastic speech that overwhelmed the Onizuka instructor. However, this is not Onizuka's car, but the beloved car of a senior detective who died in the line of duty. The senior detective's daughter is aspiring to become a detective and is keeping it with her until then. During the heavy equipment training that followed, the topic of conversation turned to Hagiwara's condition earlier. Hagiwara's family had a car repair shop, so he was apparently familiar with cars. Their childhood friend, Matsuda, had also been in the Hagiwara family factory, and they were good at tinkering with machinery. Hagiwara said, "I really wanted to take over the factory, but as soon as the business was going well and they added more stores, the economy took a turn for the worse and the factory went under. In contrast, the police never go bankrupt", he says, which is why he decided to become a police officer. After the heavy equipment training, a man approached Hagiwara and Matsuda. The man saw how good they were at their job and said, "I want to scout you for the Explosive Ordnance Disposal Unit. Matsuda immediately replies that he is interested, but Hagiwara refuses, saying that he needs to think about it once. Being in the same department as his friend Matsuda and being able to tinker with the machines he likes--this is appealing to Hagiwara, but there seems to be some reason for his reluctance.
| 4 | 1061 | "Police Academy Arc Wild Police Story CASE. Morofushi Hiromitsu"; Transliteration: "Keisatsu Gakkō-hen Wairudo Porīsu Sutōrī Kēsu. Morofushi Hiromitsu" (Japanese: 警察学校編 Wild Police Story CASE.諸伏景光) | Yasuichirō Yamamoto | October 29, 2022 |
Morofushi runs up the stairs of his house, which is engulfed in flames, as Furuya, Hagiwara, Date, and Matsuda try to stop him--! The story goes back three hours earlier. The five had been caught by Onizuka, the instructor, and ordered to clean the bathtub. While they were cleaning the bathtub, they saw the information on the copier about the girl who was reported missing last night. Morofushi had seen the girl in town and had received a picture of her. The topic naturally came up during the cleaning, but Morofushi was reluctant to go into details, saying only that she looked just like a girl he used to play with as a child. Morofushi was afraid that someone else might get involved, but the four of them all said in unison, "We're not going to die!" Morofushi was encouraged by their words. Encouraged by this, Morofushi began to talk about an incident he had encountered in the past. Fifteen years ago, Morofushi was having dinner with his father and mother when he heard the intercom ringing repeatedly. The man who visited them seemed to be an acquaintance of his father's. At first they heard him talking peacefully, but gradually the atmosphere became disturbing. The mother went to check on him, and when she returned, she told Morofushi to hide in a closet. What Morofushi sensed in the closet was the smell of iron, the strange words of the murderer, and a tattoo on his shoulder that looked like a goblet.
| 5 | SP (Note: Even though all previous episodes from Police Academy Arc Wild Police Story were officially included in total episode count, this episode was skipped and is therefore regarded as a special.) | "Police Academy Arc Wild Police Story CASE. Furuya Rei"; Transliteration: "Keisatsu Gakkō-hen Wairudo Porīsu Sutōrī Kēsu. Furuya Rei" (Japanese: 警察学校編 Wild Police Story CASE. 降谷零) | Yasuichirō Yamamoto | March 11, 2023 |
While Furuya was getting ready in his room, Morofushi, who was about to leave, came to him. As they were talking, Matsuda joined them and they decided to go out to a convenience store. Hagiwara and Date greet them with a look of dismay as the three of them take it easy before an important ceremony. Today, the graduation ceremony of the police academy where Furuya, Matsuda, Hagiwara, Date, and Morofushi spent their time, was celebrated with many fond memories. Meanwhile, a woman and her friend were touching an RX-7 parked in front of the police academy. Matsuda sees them and unintentionally yells at them. Hagiwara calms him down and pulls him inside the gate, as Matsuda had just repaired a scratch he sustained in an incident the five of them had encountered. As Date and Morofushi hurriedly followed, Furuya told the women that if they were interested in becoming police officers, they should observe the graduation ceremony. After their graduation, the five walk off into their own tomorrows.

== Reception ==
Detective Conan: Police Academy Arc – Wild Police Story's first volume was the fifth best-selling manga volume in its first week, with 122,243 copies sold, and the nineteenth best-selling manga volume in its second week, with 44,749 copies sold. The second volume was the ninth best-selling manga volume in its first week, with 101,623 copies sold.
