= The Jungle King =

1994 American animated musical film

- Directed by: Diane Eskenazi
- Written by: Diane Eskenazi (story); Jack Olesker
- Produced by: Diane Eskenazi
- Starring: Edie Mirman
- Edited by: Peter Grives
- Music by: John Arrias; Richard Hurwitz
- Production company: Golden Films
- Distributed by: Sony Wonder
- Release date: June 21, 1994 (North America)
- Running time: 44 minutes
- Country: United States
- Language: English

The Jungle King (also known as: Enchanted Tales: The Jungle King) is a 1994 American animated musical film produced by Golden Films and distributed by Sony Wonder. Diane Eskenazi, the founder of Golden Films, was the producer, director and storywriter for the film, as was the case for other animated films made by Golden Films.

It was originally released on VHS in 1994, and was most likely released to cash in on the success of Disney's The Lion King, as it was released the same year as Disney's film. The film later saw a DVD release in 2003. This animated feature was released as part of Golden Films' Enchanted Tales collection of films. The style of the film is reminiscent of the cartoons and animated films of the 1970s, 1980s and 1990s.

== Plot ==
In a jungle, a lion named Maximilian III, nicknamed Max, is a selfish, unpopular king who rules the main part of the jungle. He constantly makes preposterous laws and oppresses his subjects but is oblivious to how much he is hated by the citizens. Meanwhile, his main servants, the hyena Chancellor, the Chancellor's dancing parrot assistant Ricardo, and gorilla General Glump, constantly flatter and spoil him. One of the few times where Max is astute to political problems is when he inspects his troops on parade and realizes they are undisciplined. Meanwhile, Max's twin brother Irwin, who is timid and friendly, is writing and illustrating a book about jungle birds but has made little progress, only having finished illustrating his pet bird Daphne.

One day, Max falls in love with a young lioness named Leonette and demands to marry her, despite the fact that she also hates him. Unbeknownst to Max, the Chancellor is also in love with her and plots to take the throne. To this end, he has been doing covert work in a smaller, poorer part of the continent ruled by Emperor Raj, a tiger who is also autocratic but is more aware of issues and has a well-trained military. They plot to remove Max and attack his army while they are leaderless, allowing the Chancellor to become king and Raj to get more land. The next day, Chancellor tricks Max into bathing in the river, while Ricardo gets the attention of humans who then capture Max and imprison him in a zoo.

Upon learning of Max's capture and the Chancellor's betrayal, Glump seeks out Irwin and asks for his help. Using his likeness, Irwin poses as Max and manages to fool the Chancellor. During his ruse, he also repeals all of Max's ludicrous laws, thus winning the hearts of the citizens, including Leonette. Irwin himself falls in love with her, but she finds out that Irwin is not really the king and rejects him for his lies. The Chancellor also learns of the deception and advises Raj to attack anyway since Irwin does not know how to lead an army. Raj agrees to this but secretly plans to betray the Chancellor out of distrust.

Having had a change of heart, Ricardo seeks out Glump, who saves Max from the hunters' camp, and they both return to find the kingdom under attack by Raj and his army. The Chancellor flees after being betrayed and forces his way into Leonette's home to kidnap her. The soldiers quickly fall into disarray due to Irwin's ineptitude, but the citizens join the fight to repay his kindness. Upon seeing this, Max realizes how unpopular he actually was and assists Irwin in sending Raj's army into retreat. Irwin then rescues Leonette and defeats the Chancellor, who runs away for good after being kicked by the infuriated Leonette.

The next day, Max bestows Irwin with a medal for defending his kingdom and offers to share the monarchy with him. Irwin declines, instead choosing to go back to his old life and be with Leonette, who has reconciled with him. With Max's approval, Irwin returns with Leonette to the jungle to get his book finished, alongside Ricardo and Daphne, who have also fallen in love.

== Voice cast ==
- Edie Mirman as Leonette
- Cam Clarke as Ricardo the dancing Parrot and Emperor Raj
- Townsend Coleman (additional voices)

== See also ==
- The Lion King
