= Offside (manga) =

Japanese manga series

- First tankōbon volume cover

オフサイド (Ofusaido)
- Genre: Sports
- Manga
- Written by: Natsuko Heiuchi
- Published by: Kodansha
- Imprint: Shōnen Magazine Comics
- Magazine: Weekly Shōnen Magazine
- Original run: January 22, 1987 – April 15, 1992
- Volumes: 29
- Original video animation
- Released: January 22, 1993
- Runtime: 50 minutes
- Anime television series
- Directed by: Seiji Okuda
- Produced by: Kiyonori Hirase; Koichi Tamura
- Written by: Takao Koyama
- Music by: Masayuki Sakamoto
- Studio: Ashi Productions
- Licensed by: Crunchyroll
- Original network: Animax
- Original run: May 10, 2001 – January 31, 2002
- Episodes: 39
- icon

Offside (Japanese: オフサイド, Hepburn: Ofusaido) is a Japanese manga series written and illustrated by Natsuko Heiuchi. It was serialized in Kodansha's shōnen manga magazine Weekly Shōnen Magazine from January 1987 to April 1992, with its chapters collected in 29 tankōbon volumes.

A 50-minute original video animation (OVA) was released in January 1993. A 39-episode anime television series adaptation, produced by Ashi Productions, was broadcast on Animax from May 2001 to January 2002.

== Plot ==
Goro Kumagaya is a passionate and highly talented soccer player with exceptional physical abilities. Due to an unforeseen accident, he fails the entrance exam for Yokohama Minami High School, a prestigious public school known for its strong soccer program, and instead enrolls at the nearby private Kawasaki High School. Unlike its renowned neighbor, Kawasaki's soccer team is weak and lacks recognition. However, Goro refuses to give up on his dreams. Determined to transform the team, he rallies his teammates and leads them through rigorous training. Together, they strive to overcome their underdog status and compete for the national championship.

== Media ==
=== Manga ===
Written and illustrated by Natsuko Heiuchi, Offside was serialized in Kodansha's shōnen manga magazine Weekly Shōnen Magazine from January 22, 1987, to April 15, 1992. Kodansha collected its chapters in 29 tankōbon volumes, released from June 12, 1987, to May 12, 1992.

=== Anime ===
A 50-minute original video animation (OVA) was released by Victor Entertainment on January 22, 1993. A 39-episode anime television series, produced by Ashi Productions, was broadcast on Animax from May 10, 2001, to January 31, 2002. Crunchyroll added the series to their catalog in August 2023.
