= List of programs broadcast by Çufo =

This is a list of television programs currently broadcast (in first-run or reruns), scheduled to be broadcast, or formerly broadcast on Çufo, an Albanian television channel. The channel was launched on December 18, 2006, and airs foreign animated programming for children.

== Current programming ==
- ^{†} Indicates program is broadcast in the format of a movie.
- ^{‡} Indicates program was moved to Bang Bang.
- ^{⹋} Indicates program is broadcast sporadically throughout the year with no consistent seasonal schedule.
- The Backyardigans^{⹋} (Çamarrokët e kopshtit)
- Biker Mice from Mars (Motoçiklistet nga Marsi)
- Chloe's Closet^{⹋} (Dollapi i Kloes)
- Cocomong^{⹋} (Kokomongo)
- Glitch Techs^{⹋} (Teknikë teknologjikë)
- Justice League (Skuadra e drejtësisë)
- Kung Fu Panda: Legends of Awesomeness^{⹋} (Kung Fu Panda: Legjenda të jashtëzakonshme)
- Little Witch Academia^{⹋} (Akademia e shtrigave)
- Mickey Mouse Clubhouse^{⹋} (Klubi i miushit Miki)
- Mighty MonsterWheelies^{⹋} (Të plotfuqishmit kamionët përbindësha)
- Naruto
- Rob the Robot^{⹋} (Rob roboti)
- SpongeBob SquarePants^{⹋} (Bob Sfungjeri)
- Star Wars: Young Jedi Adventures^{⹋} (Luftërat e yjeve: Aventurat e kalorësve të vegjël)
- Teen Titans^{⹋} (Titanët e rinj)

== Discontinued programming ==
- 101 Dalmatians: The Series^{⹋} (101 dalmatët: Seriali)
- A Little Snow Fairy Sugar^{⹋} (Sheqerka, zana e vogël e dëborës)
- Abby Hatcher^{⹋} (Ebi Heçer/Vogëlushja Ebi)
- Action Man
- Adventures of Sonic the Hedgehog (Aventurat e Iriqit Sonik)
- Abominable and the Invisible City^{⹋} (Everesti dhe qyteti i padukshëm)
- Adventures of the Gummi Bears (Aventurat e arinjve Gami)
- All Hail King Julien^{‡} (Rroftë mbreti Xhuljan)
- Amazing History (Histori magjike)
- Amazing World (Botë magjike)
- American Dragon: Jake Long^{⹋} (Dragoi amerikan: Xhek Long)
- Amphibia^{⹋} (Amfibia)
- Animaniacs^{⹋} (Animaniakët)
- Anne of Green Gables (Ana në shtëpinë çatigjelbër)
- Astro Boy^{⹋} (Roboti Astro)
- Avatar: The Last Airbender^{⹋} (Avatar: Mjeshtri i fundit i ajrit)
- Avengers Assemble^{⹋} (Skuadra Hakmarrësit/Skuadra e Hakmarrësve)
- A.T.O.M^{⹋} (ATOM: Një skuadër në aksion)
- Barbapapa (Mjëkëroshët)
- Barbie Dreamhouse Adventures^{‡} (Aventurat e Barbit në shtëpinë e ëndrrave)
- Barney & Friends (Barni dhe miqtë)
- Batfink
- Bear in the Big Blue House (Ariu në shtëpinë e madhe blu)
- Beware the Batman^{⹋} (Kujdes nga Batmani)
- Big Hero 6: The Series^{⹋} (6 heronjtë: Seriali)
- Bionic Six (Gjashtë bionikët)
- Bob the Builder^{⹋} (Bob ndërtuesi)
- Bonkers^{⹋}
- Bo on the Go!^{⹋} (Bota e mrekullueshme e Bosë)
- Blaze and the Monster Machines^{⹋} (Flakërima dhe makinat përbindësh)
- Blue's Clues^{⹋} (Gjurmët e Blusë)
- Brady's Beasts (Përbindëshat e Bredit)
- Bruno the Kid (Bruno djaloshi/Djaloshi Bruno)
- Bubble Guppies (Sirenat gazmore)
- Bubble Marin^{⹋} (Marin flluska/Flluska Marin)
- Case Closed (Detektivi Konan)
- Caillou^{†} ^{⹋} (Kaiju/Kaju)
- Carmen Sandiego^{⹋} (Karmen Sandiego)
- Cars on the Road^{⹋} (Aventurat e makinave)
- CatDog^{⹋} (Maçoku-Qen)
- Charlie and Lola^{⹋} (Çarli dhe Lola)
- Chip 'n Dale: Rescue Rangers (Çip dhe Dejl: Hetuesit shpëtimtarë)
- Clifford the Big Red Dog^{⹋} (Qenushi Kliford)
- Chuggington^{⹋} (Çagington)
- Cloudbabies^{‡} (Bebet e reve)
- Cocco Bill (Koko Bill)
- Cone Control^{⹋} (Qendra e kontrollit të koneve)
- Cooking? Child's Play! (Le të luajmë duke gatuar)
- Cupido^{†} (Kupido)
- Danny Phantom^{⹋} (Fantazma Deni)
- Diabolik
- Dinofroz (Dragonjtë vampirë)
- D'Myna Leagues (Skuadra Majna)
- Dora the Explorer (Dora eksploruesja)
- Doug (Dagu)
- Dragon (Dragoi)
- Dragon Ball^{⹋} (Sferat e dragoit)
- Dragon Ball Daima (Sferat e dragoit Daima)
- Dragon Ball GT^{⹋} (Sferat e dragoit GT)
- Dragon Ball Super^{⹋} (Sferat e dragoit Super)
- Dragon Ball Z^{⹋} (Sferat e dragoit Z)
- Dragon Flyz (Skuadra e dragojve)
- DreamWorks Dragons^{⹋} (Dragonjtë: Kalorësit e Berkut/Dragonjtë: Mbrojtësit e Berkut/Dragonjtë: Gara në ekstreme)
- DuckTales^{‡} (Rrëfenjat e rosakut)
- The Fairly OddParents (Prindër të çuditshëm)
- Enchanted Lands: The Magic of the Faraway^{†} ^{‡} (Pema e tokës së largët)
- The Flintstones^{⹋} (Familja Flinstons)
- Eckhart^{⹋} (Ekart)
- Engie Benjy^{⹋} (Enxhi Benxhi)
- Eureka Seven (Eureka shtatë)
- Everything's Rosie (Bota e Rozit)
- Fast & Furious Spy Racers (Shpejtësi dhe çmenduri: Spiunë në timon)
- Fimbles^{⹋} (Fimbëllsat)
- Fish Hooks^{⹋} (Grepa peshku)
- Future Robot Daltanious (Daltanius, roboti i së ardhmes)
- Galaxy Racers^{⹋} (Garuesit e galaktikës)
- Garfield and Friends (Garfildi dhe shokët e tij)
- Gargoyles (Statujat gargoils)
- Geronimo Stilton^{⹋} (Jeronim Stilton)
- Gladiator Academy (Shkolla e gladiatorëve)
- Gladiators (Gladiatorët)
- Go, Diego, Go! (Diego)
- Goldie & Bear^{‡} (Flokëarta dhe ariu)
- Gordon the Garden Gnome^{†} ^{⹋} (Elfi Gordon)
- Green Lantern: The Animated Series (Feneri i gjelbër)
- Handy Manny^{⹋} (Meni duararti)
- Harold and the Purple Crayon^{⹋} (Haroldi dhe lapsi lejla)
- Harriet the Spy^{⹋} (Spiunia Heriet)
- Harry and His Bucket Full of Dinosaurs (Herri dhe dinosaurët)
- Harvey Beaks^{⹋} (Harvi Biks)
- He-Man and the Masters of the Universe (He Man/Hi Men)
- Heathcliff (Hetklif)
- Hello Kitty's Animation Theater (Historitë e Kikit)
- Hello Kitty: Ringo no Mori^{†} (Hello Kiti - Qyteti paralel)
- Hello Kitty's Paradise^{†} (Parajsa e Hello Kitit/Kiti bukuroshja)
- Hello Kitty's Stump Village^{†} (Hello Kiti - Fshati me pemë)
- Heidi, Girl of the Alps (Haidi)
- Henry Hugglemonster^{‡} (Henri, perbindeshi zemermire)
- Home: Adventures with Tip & Oh^{⹋} (Aventurat e dyshes Tip dhe O)
- Hong Kong Phooey^{⹋} (Hong Kong Fui)
- Hotel Transylvania: The Series^{⹋} (Hotel Transilvania: Seriali)
- House of Mouse (Aventurat e miushit Miki)
- Hulk and the Agents of S.M.A.S.H.^{⹋} (Hulku dhe agjentet superheronj)
- The Incredible Hulk ^{†} ^{⹋} (Hulku i tmerrshëm)
- IGPX^{‡} (Kampjonati i shpejtësisë)
- In the Night Garden... (Një pasdite në kopësht)
- Inazuma Eleven^{⹋} (Njëmbëdhjetëshja e Inazumës)
- Infinity Nado (Disqet magjike)
- Iron Kid (Fëmija i hekurt)
- Iron Man (TV series)^{⹋} (Njeriu i hekurt)
- Jackie Chan Adventures (Aventurat e Xheki Çan)
- Jason and the Heroes of Mount Olympus^{⹋} (Xhejsoni dhe heronjtë e malit Olimp)
- Jelly Jamm^{‡} (Planeti i muzikës)
- Jin Jin and the Panda Patrol^{†} ^{⹋} (Xhin Xhini)
- Johnny Bravo (Xhoni Bravo)
- Julius Jr.^{⹋} (Xhuliusi i vogël)
- Jurassic World Camp Cretaceous (Bota Xhurasik: Aventura të reja)
- Kenny the Shark (Keni peshkaqeni)
- Kaleido Star^{†} (Ylli i Kaleidos)
- Kamp Koral: SpongeBob's Under Years (Kampi i koraleve)
- Kate & Mim-Mim^{⹋} (Kejti dhe Mim Mimi)
- Kim Possible^{⹋} (Kim Posibëll)
- Kipper^{†} ^{⹋} (Kiper)
- Kiri le clown (Kllouni Kiri)
- Krypto the Superdog (Kripto super qeni)
- Kung Fu Panda: The Dragon Knight^{⹋} (Kung Fu Panda: Kalorësi i dragoit)
- Kuroko's Basketball (Basketbolli i Kurokos)
- Larryboy: The Cartoon Adventures^{†} ^{⹋} (Leri-Djali)
- La Seine no Hoshi^{⹋} (Tulipani i zi)
- Lassie (Aventurat e reja te Lesit)
- Lavender Castle^{⹋} (Kështjella e purpurt)
- The Legend of Korra (Legjenda e Korës)
- Legends of Chima^{‡} (Legjenda e Çimës)
- Lego Star Wars: The Freemaker Adventures^{⹋} (Lufta e yjeve LEGO: Aventurat e familjes Frimeiker)
- Little Einsteins (Ajnshtajnët e vegjël)
- Little Pollon (Na ishte një herë Polona)
- Loonatics Unleashed (Lunatikët)
- The Loud House^{⹋} (Shtëpia e zhurmshme)
- Lunar Jim (Xhim hënori)
- Lupo Alberto (Ujku Alberto)
- Madeline (Madlina)
- Mademoiselle Zazie^{⹋} (Zonjusha Zazi)
- Magic Tiger^{⹋} (Tigri magjik)
- Magic Wonderland (Bota magjike e çudirave)
- Maisy^{⹋} (Ferma e Meizit/Meizi)
- Max & Ruby^{⹋} (Maksi dhe Rubi)
- Maya and the Three^{⹋} (Maja dhe 3 luftëtarët)
- Men in Black: The Series ( Burrat me të zeza)
- Mermaid Melody Pichi Pichi Pitch^{⹋} (Princesha sirenë)
- Mia and Me (Mia dhe unë)
- Milo
- Miniforce^{‡} (Forcat e vogla)
- Miss Spider's Sunny Patch Friends^{†} ^{⹋} (Zonja Merimangë dhe miqtë e saj nga Toka me Diell)
- Moby Dick and the Secret of Mu^{⹋} (Mobi Dik dhe sekreti i Musë)
- Mock & Sweet (Bota gazmore e urithëve)
- Monica and Friends (Banda e Monikës)
- Monsters vs. Aliens^{‡} (Perbindëshat kundër alienëve)
- Moominvalley^{⹋} (Mumins në tokën e dëborës)
- Muppet Babies^{⹋} (Bebet e kukullave)
- My Dad the Bounty Hunter^{⹋} (Babai im, gjuetari i alienëve)
- My Friends Tigger & Pooh^{⹋} (Miqtë e mi tigri dhe Puh)
- My Life As a Teenage Robot^{⹋} (Jeta e një roboti adoleshent)
- Mysticons^{⹋} (Mistiket)
- Nadia: The Secret of Blue Water^{⹋} (Misteri i gurit të kaltër)
- Naruto Shippuden (Naruto Shipuden)
- NASCAR Racers^{⹋} (Pilotët ekstremë)
- Naya's Arctic Adventures (Aventurat e Najës dhe miqve të saj)
- New Captain Scarlet (Kapiten Skarlet)
- Ni Hao, Kai-Lan^{⹋} (Përshëndetje, Kai Lan)
- Ōban Star-Racers^{⹋} (Oban: Garat e yjeve)
- Olivia^{†} ^{⹋} (Krishtlindjet e Olivias)
- One Piece (Piratët e vegjël)
- Pac-Man and the Ghostly Adventures^{‡} (Pak Mani dhe aventura me fantazma)
- Patta Potta Monta^{⹋} (Të bëhesh i egër)
- Paw in Paw^{‡} (Teatri i putrave)
- Peg + Cat^{⹋} (Pegi + macja)
- Peppa Pig (Derrkucja Pepa)
- Pet Squad^{⹋} (Skuadra e kafshëve)
- Pete the Cat^{⹋} (Maçoku Pit)
- Phantom Investigators (Hetuesit e fantazmave)
- Phineas and Ferb^{⹋} (Fines dhe Ferb)
- Pimpa
- Pingu
- Pirate Family^{⹋} (Familja e piratëve)
- Planet Sheen^{⹋} (Planeti Shin)
- Pocoyo (Pokojo)
- Popeye the Sailor (Popei marinari)
- Pororo the Little Penguin^{⹋} (Pororo)
- Prezzemolo^{†} (Precemoli)
- Princesse Shéhérazade (Sherazade)
- Pucca^{⹋} (Puka dhe miqtë)
- Puppy Dog Pals^{‡} (Qenushët)
- Quack Pack^{†} ^{⹋}
- Redwall (Muri i kuq)
- Remi, Nobody's Girl^{⹋} (Vogëlushja e ëmbël Remi)
- Puppy in My Pocket: Adventures in Pocketville (Miku im këlysh)
- Rat-Man
- Revolutionary Girl Utena (Utena, vajza revolucionare)
- Rise of the Teenage Mutant Ninja Turtles^{⹋} (Fati i breshkave adoleshente ninxha)
- Robin Hood^{†} (Robin Hud: Lind heroi i pyllit)
- Robocar Poli^{⹋} (Makina robot Poli)
- RoboCop (Robokop)
- Rurouni Kenshin (Samurai X)
- Saban's Adventures of Oliver Twist^{⹋} (Oliver Tuist)
- Saban's Adventures of the Little Mermaid^{⹋} (Aventurat e sirenës se vogël)
- Sailor Moon (Luftëtarja e hënës)
- Sanjay and Craig^{⹋} (Sanxhei dhe Kregu)
- SantApprentice^{⹋} (Ndihmësi i Babagjyshit)
- Sergeant Stripes (Rreshteri Strajps)
- She-Ra and the Princesses of Power (Shi-Ra dhe princeshat luftëtare)
- Shimmer and Shine^{⹋} (Shimeri dhe Shajni)
- Sid the Science Kid^{⹋} (Shkencëtari i vogël Sid)
- Sitting Ducks (Aventurat e rosakëve)
- Sky Dancers^{⹋} (Kërcimtarët e qiellit)
- Snailsbury Tales (Qyteti i kërminjve)
- Space Racers^{⹋} (Akademia e hapesires)
- Spider-Man (Njeriu Merimangë)
- Spy × Family^{⹋} (Familja e spiunit)
- Star Wars: Clone Wars^{†} (Lufta e yjeve: Lufta e kloneve)
- Star Wars Rebels^{‡} (Rebelët e luftës së yjeve)
- Strawberry Shortcake^{‡} (Luleshtrydhe zemërëmbla)
- Stuart Little^{⹋} (Stjuarti i vogël)
- Super Mario World (Super Mario dhe Kapiteni N)
- Sunny Day^{⹋} (Ditari i Diellzës)
- Super Monsters^{⹋} (Super perbindeshat)
- Super Why!^{⹋} (Super Pse-ja)
- Super Wings^{⹋} (Super krahët)
- Swirl Fighter (Luftëtarët e fuqishëm)
- T.O.T.S.^{⹋} (Pipi dhe Fredi: Postierët e bebeve)
- T.U.F.F. Puppy^{⹋} (Skuadra e ndërhyrjeve speciale)
- Tak and the Power of Juju (Tak dhe fuqia e Xhuxhu)
- TaleSpin (Rrëfenja aventurash)
- Taotao (Panda e vogël Tao Tao)
- Tayo the Little Bus^{⹋} (Autobusi i vogël Tajo)
- Taz-Mania
- Teamo Supremo (Skuadra supreme)
- Teen Titans Go!^{⹋} (Forca titanët e rinj/Forca, Adoleshentë Titanë)
- Teenage Mutant Ninja Turtles (2003 TV series) (Teenage Mutant Ninxha)
- Teenage Mutant Ninja Turtles (2012 TV series) (Breshkat adoleshente ninxha)
- The 7D^{⹋} (7 xhuxhat)
- The Adventures of Chuck and Friends^{‡} (Aventurat e Çakut dhe miqve të tij)
- The Adventures of Jimmy Neutron, Boy Genius^{⹋} (Aventurat e Xhimi Neutron: Djali gjeni)
- The Adventures of Little Brown Bear^{⹋} (Aventurat e arushit të vogël)
- The Adventures of Rocky and Bullwinkle^{⹋} (Aventurat e Rokit dhe Bulluinkëllit)
- The Adventures of Tom Sawyer (Aventurat e Tom Sojerit)
- The Angry Beavers (Kastorët e zemëruar)
- The Berenstain Bears (Arinjtë Berenstein)
- The Buzz on Maggie^{⹋} (Gumëzhima Megi)
- The Charlie Brown and Snoopy Show^{⹋} (Shfaqja e Çarli Braun dhe Snupit)
- The Creature Cases^{⹋} (Semi dhe Kiti: Misteret e mbretërisë së kafshëve)
- The Emperor's New School^{‡} (Kusko: Perandori shkon në shkollë)
- The Great Book of Nature (Përralla me kafshë)
- The Legend of Snow White (Legjenda e Borëbardhës)
- The Lion Guard (Garda e luanit)
- The Littles (Të vegjëlit)
- The Looney Tunes Show (Shfaqja e Luni Tunsave)
- The Magic School Bus Rides Again^{⹋} (Aventurat e reja të autobuzit magjik)
- The Nimbols (Nimbols, kadetet e hapësirës/Kadetet e hapësirës)
- The Pebbles and Bamm-Bamm Show (Shfaqja e Pepëlls dhe Bam-Bam)
- The Penguins of Madagascar^{‡} (Pinguinët e Madagaskarit)
- The Ren & Stimpy Show (Reni dhe Stimpi)
- The Road Runner Show (Zogu vrapues)
- The Rocketeer^{⹋} (Kiti aviatorja)
- The Rose of Versailles^{⹋} (Ledi Oskar)
- The Save-Ums! (Shpëtimtarët)
- The Snoopy Show^{⹋} (Shfaqja e Snupit)
- The Spaghetti Family (Familja spageti)
- The Super Hero Squad Show^{⹋} (Skuadra e Superheronjve)
- The Sylvester & Tweety Mysteries (Misteret e Tutit dhe Silvestres/Misteret e Tuti dhe Silvester)
- The Twins of Destiny^{⹋} (Binjakët e fatit)
- The Woodlies^{⹋} (Banorët e pyllit)
- This Is America, Charlie Brown^{⹋} (Kjo është Amerika, Çarli Braun) (Note: This series is broadcast as part of The Charlie Brown and Snoopy Show.)
- Thomas & Friends^{⹋} (Lokomotiva Tomas dhe shokët)
- ThunderCats (Planetketët)
- Timmy Time (Qengji Timi)
- Timon & Pumbaa^{⹋} (Timon dhe Pumba)
- Tiny Planets (Bing dhe Bong)
- Tiny Toon Adventures^{†} (Krishtlindje me kartonat)
- Tokyo Mew Mew^{⹋} (Luftetaret mace/Mew Mew)
- Tom & Jerry Kids (Shfaqja e Tomit dhe Xherit)
- The Tom and Jerry Show (Shfaqja e Tomit dhe Xherrit)
- Totally Spies! (Spiunet e tmerrshme/Totalisht spiune)
- Totally Tooned In (Të magjepsur pas kartonave)
- Transformers: Prime^{⹋} (Transformuesit Prim/Transformuesit Kryesorë)
- Transformers: Rescue Bots^{⹋} (Transformuesit shpëtojnë robot)
- Tree Fu Tom^{‡} (Aventura magjike e Tomit)
- Trolls: The Beat Goes On!^{‡} (Trolët: Ritmi vazhdon)
- Turtle Hero (Breshka hero)
- Tutenstein
- TuTiTu^{‡}
- Tweeny Witches (Aventurat e tre shtrigave të reja)
- Uki^{⹋}
- Ultimate Spider-Man^{⹋} (Aventurat e reja të Njeriut Merimangë)
- Van Dogh (Van Dog)
- VeggieTales^{†} (Perimet/Rrëfenja perimesh/Tregimet e perimeve)
- Vicky the Viking (Viki vikingu)
- Vipo: Adventures of the Flying Dog (Vipo: Aventurat e qenit fluturues)
- W.I.T.C.H.^{⹋} (Luftëtaret mbrojtëse U.I.T.K.H)
- Waybuloo^{⹋} (Urra)
- Welcome to the Wayne^{⹋} (Miresevini ne Uejn)
- Wide-Eye (Buf symadhi)
- Wishenpoof!^{‡} (Prekje magjike)
- Wonder Pets!^{⹋} (Kafshët fantastike)
- The World of David the Gnome^{⹋} (Xhuxhi David miku im)
- X-Men: The Animated Series (Njerëzit-X)
- Young Justice (Heronjtë e rinj)
- Yu-Gi-Oh! GX
- Zenki^{⹋}
- Zheng He's Voyages to the West Seas (Udhëtimi i Zheng Hi drejt deteve të perëndimit)
- Zigby^{⹋} (Zebra Zigbi)
- Zou^{⹋} (Zu)
- Zumbers
