= List of programs broadcast by Bang Bang =

Bang Bang's current logo

This is a list of television programs currently broadcast (in first-run or reruns), scheduled to be broadcast, or formerly broadcast on Bang Bang, an Albanian television channel by DigitAlb that airs a mix of animated television series, animated and live-action films as well as live-action Albanian originals produced by DigitAlb.

== Current programming ==
=== Dubbed programming ===
- The Adventures of Chuck and Friends (Aventurat e Çakut dhe miqve të tij)
- Angel's Friends^{⹋} (Miqtë e ëngjëllit)
- Angry Birds: Summer Madness^{⹋} (Zogjtë e inatosur: Çmenduria verore)
- Barbie Mysteries (Misteret e Barbit)
- Barbie Dreamhouse Adventures^{⹋} (Aventurat e Barbit në shtëpinë e ëndrrave)
- The Boss Baby: Back in Business^{⹋} (Bebi Bos: Rikthim në biznes)
- The Chicken Squad^{⹋} (Skuadra e pulës)
- Doc McStuffins^{⹋} (Doktoresha e lodrave)
- Inspector Gadget^{⹋} (Inspektori Gaxhet)
- Jelly Jamm^{⹋} (Planeti i muzikës)
- The Looney Tunes Show^{⹋} (Shfaqja e Luni Tunsave)
- My Knight and Me^{⹋} (Unë dhe kalorësi im)
- PJ Masks^{⹋} (Heronjtë me pizhama)
- Rusty Rivets^{⹋} (Rasti krijuesi)
- Spidey and His Amazing Friends^{⹋} (Merimanga e mrekullive dhe miqtë e tij mahnitës)
- Star Wars Rebels^{⹋} (Rebelët e luftës së yjeve)
- Trash Truck (Henku dhe kamioni i mbeturinave)
- Tree Fu Tom^{⹋} (Aventura magjike e Tomit)

== Defunct programming ==
=== Original series ===
- Art Instinkt
- Fëmijët e dijnë më mirë
- Diell
- Ne të 3 dhe xhaxha Beni
- Njerëzit, këta shpikës të çuditshëm
- Pipi
- Rreth nesh (now on RTSH Fëmijë)
- Shtëpiza e përrallave
- Të luajmë shkollash

=== Dubbed programming ===
- ^{†} Indicates program is broadcast in the format of a movie.
- ^{‡} Indicates program was moved to Çufo.
- ^{⹋} Indicates program is broadcast sporadically throughout the year with no consistent seasonal schedule.

- 101 Dalmatians: The Series^{‡} (101 dalmatët: Seriali)
- A Little Snow Fairy Sugar^{‡} (Sheqerka, zana e vogël e dëborës)
- Adventures of Sonic the Hedgehog^{‡} (Aventurat e Iriqit Sonik)
- Adventures of the Gummi Bears^{‡} (Aventurat e arinjve Gami)
- All Hail King Julien^{⹋} (Rroftë mbreti Xhuljan)
- Alvinnn!!! and the Chipmunks^{⹋} (ALVINNN!!! dhe ketrushët)
- Alvin and the Chipmunks (Alvin dhe fytyrëketrushët)
- Amazing History^{‡} (Histori magjike)
- Amazing World^{‡} (Botë magjike)
- Animaniacs^{‡} (Animaniakët)
- Attacker You! (Mila dhe Shiro)
- Avatar: The Last Airbender^{‡} (Avatar: Mjeshtri i fundit i ajrit)
- BB3B
- Bananaman (Njeriu banane)
- Barbapapa^{‡} (Mjëkëroshët)
- Barney & Friends^{‡} (Barni dhe miqtë)
- Batfink
- Batman: The Animated Series (Batman: Legjenda filloi)
- Bear in the Big Blue House (Ariu në shtëpinë e madhe blu)
- Ben & Holly's Little Kingdom (Mbretëria e vogël e Benit dhe Hollit)
- Biker Mice from Mars^{‡} (Motoçiklistet nga Marsi)
- Bionic Six^{‡} (Gjashtë bionikët)
- Blue's Clues^{‡} (Gjurmët e Blusë)
- Bo on the Go!^{‡} (Bota e mrekullueshme e Bosë)
- Bob the Builder^{‡} (Bob ndërtuesi)
- Bonkers^{‡}
- Brady's Beasts (Përbindëshat e Bredit)
- Bubble Guppies^{‡} (Sirenat gazmore)
- Bugs Bunny (Bags Bani)
- Buzz and Poppy (Buzi dhe Popi)
- Caillou^{†} ^{‡} (Kaiju/Kaju)
- Captain Tsubasa^{‡} (Oli dhe Benxhi)
- Case Closed^{‡} (Detektivi Konan)
- Charlie and Lola^{‡} (Çarli dhe Lola)
- Chip 'n Dale: Rescue Rangers^{‡} (Çip dhe Dejl: Hetuesit shpëtimtarë)
- Chip 'n' Dale^{‡} (Çip dhe Dejl)
- Chuggington^{‡} (Çagington)
- Clifford the Big Red Dog^{‡} (Qenushi Kliford)
- Cocco Bill (Koko Bill)
- Cone Control^{‡} (Qendra e kontrollit të koneve)
- Cubeez
- Cyborg Kuro-chan (Punë macesh)
- Daniel Tiger's Neighborhood (Tigri i vogël Daniel)
- Dash Kappei (Xhixhi basketbollisti)
- Dawn of the Croods^{⹋} (Perëndimi i Krudëve)
- Diabolik
- Digimon Fusion (Betejat e Dixhimonit)
- Dogtanian and the Three Muskehounds (Dagtaniani dhe musketierët)
- Dora and Friends: Into the City!^{⹋} (Aventurat e Dorës dhe miqve të saj)
- Dora the Explorer^{‡} (Dora eksploruesja)
- Dragon (Dragoi)
- Dragon Ball^{‡} (Sferat e dragoit)
- Dragon Ball Z^{‡} (Sferat e dragoit Z)
- Dragon Tales (Rrëfenja dragonjsh)
- DuckTales^{⹋} (Rrëfenjat e rosakut)
- Dungeons & Dragons (Tunele dhe dragonj)
- Eckhart^{‡} (Ekart)
- Elena of Avalor (Elena e Avalorit)
- Emily of New Moon (2007 TV series)^{⹋} (Emilia e hënës së re)
- Engie Benjy^{‡} (Enxhi Benxhi)
- Fancy Nancy (Nensi elegantja)
- Fimbles^{‡} (Fimbëllsat)
- Fresh Pretty Cure!
- Futari wa Pretty Cure (Luftëtaret e bukura)
- Galactik Football^{⹋} (Futbolli galaktik)
- Gargoyles (Statujat gargoils)
- Get Ed^{⹋} (Kapeni Edin)
- Go! Go! Cory Carson (Aventurat e Korit)
- Go! Princess PreCure (Ëndërroni! Princeshat luftëtare)
- Go, Diego, Go!^{‡} (Diego)
- Go, Dog. Go!^{⹋} (Forca, qenush, forca)
- Gokū no Daibōken (Aventurat e mëdha të Gokut)
- Goldie & Bear^{⹋} (Flokëarta dhe ariu)
- Gordon the Garden Gnome^{†} ^{‡} (Elfi Gordon)
- Green Light: Traffic Safety (Drita jeshile)
- Guardians of the Galaxy (Rojtarët e Galaktikës)
- Hamtaro
- HappinessCharge PreCure! (Luftëtaret e bukura të lumturisë)
- Happy Adventures (Aventura të bukura)
- Heidi, Girl of the Alps^{‡} (Haidi)
- Hello Kitty and Friends (Kiti dhe miqtë e saj)
- Hello Kitty's Animation Theater (Historitë e Kikit)
- Hello Kitty's Paradise (Parajsa e Hello Kitit/Kiti bukuroshja)
- Hello Kitty: Ringo no Mori (Hello Kiti - Qyteti paralel)
- Hello Kitty's Stump Village (Hello Kiti - Fshati me pemë)
- Hello Ninja (Përshendetje, ninxha)
- Henry Hugglemonster (Henri, perbindeshi zemermire)
- Heroes of the City (Heronjtë e qytetit)
- Horseland
- House of Mouse^{‡} (Aventurat e Miushit Miki)
- Hugtto! PreCure (Luftëtaret e dashurise)
- IGPX^{⹋} (Kampjonati i shpejtësisë)
- In the Night Garden...^{‡} (Një pasdite në kopësht)
- Jackie Chan Adventures^{‡} (Aventurat e Xheki Çan)
- Jake and the Never Land Pirates^{⹋} (Xheku dhe piratët e ishullit të Askundit)
- Jason and the Heroes of Mount Olympus^{‡} (Xhejsoni dhe heronjtë e malit Olimp)
- Jinzou Konchū Kabutoborg VxV (Kabutoborg)
- Johnny Bravo^{‡} (Xhoni Bravo)
- The Jungle Book^{†} (Libri i Xhunglës)
- Jungle Junction^{⹋} (Një shëtitje në xhungël)
- Jurassic Cubs (Të vegjëlit e dinozaurëve)
- Justice League^{‡} (Skuadra e drejtësisë)
- Kaleido Star^{†} (Ylli i Kaleidos)
- Kim Possible^{‡} (Kim Posibëll)
- Kioka^{⹋}
- Kirakira Pretty Cure a la Mode (Luftëtaret e bukura xixëlluese janë në modë)
- Larryboy: The Cartoon Adventures^{†} ^{‡} (Leri-Djali)
- Legends of Chima (Legjenda e Çimës)
- Les Misérables: Shōjo Cosette (Zemra e kozetës)
- Little Einsteins^{32} (Ajnshtajnët e vegjël)
- Little Princess (Princesha e vogël)
- Little Robots (Robotët e vegjël)
- Littlest Pet Shop^{⹋} (Dyqani i vogël i kafshëve)
- LoliRock^{⹋}
- Loonatics Unleashed^{‡} (Lunatikët)
- Lost in Oz^{⹋} (E humbur në Oz)
- Luna Petunia^{⹋}
- Lupo Alberto (Ujku Alberto)
- Mademoiselle Zazie^{‡} (Zonjusha Zazi)
- Magic Tiger^{‡} (Tigri magjik)
- Magic Wonderland (Bota magjike e çudirave)
- Magical Circle Guru Guru (Guru Guru)
- Marvelous Melmo (Karamelet magjike të Lilit)
- Masha and the Bear^{⹋} (Masha dhe ariu)
- Max & Ruby^{‡} (Maksi dhe Rubi)
- Max Steel
- Men in Black: The Series^{‡} (Burrat me të zeza)
- Mia and Me (Mia dhe unë)
- Mickey Mouse and Friends (Miushi Miki dhe miqtë)
- Mickey Mouse Clubhouse^{‡} (Klubi i miushit Miki)
- Mickey Mouse Mixed-Up Adventures^{⹋} (Miki dhe garuesit e makinave)
- Mickey Mouse Works (Aventurat e Miushit Miki)
- Miles from Tomorrowland^{⹋} (Majlsi nga e ardhmja)
- Milo^{‡}
- Miniforce (Forcat e vogla)
- Miraculous: Tales of Ladybug & Cat Noir (Magjikët: Aventurat e Nusepashkës dhe Maçoku i zi)
- Mirmo! (Mirmo)
- Miss Spider's Sunny Patch Friends^{†} ^{‡} (Zonja Merimangë dhe miqtë e saj nga Toka me Diell)
- Moby Dick and the Secret of Mu^{‡} (Mobi Dik dhe sekreti i Musë)
- Monica and Friends (Banda e Monikës)
- Monster Allergy (Alergji nga përbindëshat)
- Monster by Mistake (Gabimisht përbindësh)
- Monsters & Pirates (Përbindësha dhe piratë)
- Monsters at Work^{⹋} (Përbindëshat në punë)
- Monsters vs. Aliens^{⹋} (Perbindëshat kundër alienëve)
- Mouk^{⹋} (Muk)
- My Friends Tigger & Pooh^{‡} (Miqtë e mi tigri dhe Puh)
- My Life as a Teenage Robot^{‡} (Jeta e një roboti adoleshent)
- My Little Pony: Friendship Is Magic^{⹋} (Miqësia është magjike me ponin tim të vogël)
- Naruto Shippuden^{‡} (Naruto Shipuden)
- Naruto^{‡}
- Nella the Princess Knight^{⹋} (Nela, princesha kalorëse)
- New Captain Scarlet (Kapiten Skarlet)
- Ni Hao, Kai-Lan^{‡} (Përshëndetje, Kai Lan)
- Ōban Star-Racers^{‡} (Oban: Garat e yjeve)
- Octonauts^{⹋} (Oktonautët)
- Ohayō! Spank (Përshëndetje, Spenki!)
- Olivia^{†} ^{‡}
- Pac-Man and the Ghostly Adventures^{⹋} (Pak Mani dhe aventura me fantazma)
- Paw in Paw^{‡} (Teatri i putrave)
- Paw Patrol^{⹋} (Patrulla e putrave)
- Patta Potta Monta^{‡} (Të bëhesh i egër)
- Penn Zero: Part-Time Hero'^{⹋} (Pen Zero: Hero me kohë të pjesshme)
- Peppa Pig^{‡} (Derrkucja Pepa)
- Pet Pals (Këlyshët)
- Peter Rabbit^{⹋} (Lepuri Piter)
- Phantom Investigators (Hetuesit e fantazmave)
- Pingu
- Planet Sheen^{‡} (Planeti Shin)
- Pocoyo^{‡} (Pokojo)
- Pokémon
- Pokémon Chronicles (Kronika e Pokemonëve)
- Pororo the Little Penguin^{‡} (Pororo)
- Postman Pat (Postieri Pat)
- Prezzemolo (Precemoli)
- Princesse Shéhérazade (Sherazade)
- Puppy Dog Pals (Qenushët)
- Quack Pack^{†} ^{‡}
- Rainbow Brite (Iridela)
- Rapunzel's Tangled Adventure^{⹋} (Rapanzëll: Seriali)
- Redwall (Muri i kuq)
- Remi, Nobody's Girl (Vogëlushja e ëmbël Remi)
- Revolutionary Girl Utena (Utena, vajza revolucionare)
- Rubi and Yoyo (Rubi dhe Jojo)
- Rurouni Kenshin (Samurai X)
- Sailor Moon^{‡} (Luftëtaret e hënës)
- Sailor Moon Sailor Stars^{‡} (Seilor Star)
- Sailor Moon Crystal^{‡} (Luftëtarja e hënës: Kristali i rojtareve të planeteve)
- Sailor Moon R^{‡} (Luftëtarja e hënës R)
- Sailor Moon S^{‡} (Luftëtarja e hënës S)
- Sailor Moon SuperS^{‡} (Super Luftëtarja e hënës)
- Samurai Rabbit: The Usagi Chronicles^{⹋} (Lepuri samurai: Kronikat e Usagit)
- SantApprentice^{‡} (Ndihmësi i Babagjyshit)
- Scooby-Doo, Where Are You! (Skubi-Du)
- Shadow of the Elves (Legjenda e elfëve)
- Sheriff Callie's Wild West^{⹋} (Perëndimi i egër i sherifes Keli)
- Sherlock Yack^{⹋} (Dedektivi i kopështit zoologjik)
- Shimmer and Shine^{‡} (Shimeri dhe Shajni)
- Sid the Science Kid^{‡} (Shkencëtari i vogël Sid)
- Simsala Grimm^{⹋} (Simsala Grim)
- Sitting Ducks^{‡} (Aventurat e rosakëve)
- Sky Dancers^{‡} (Kërcimtarët e qiellit)
- Smile PreCure! (Luftëtaret e bukura të buzëqeshjes)
- Snailsbury Tales (Qyteti i kërminjve)
- Sofia the First^{⹋} (Sofia e parë)
- Sonic Boom^{⹋} (Bumi sonik)
- Sonic Prime^{⹋} (Iriqi Sonik: Aventurat e reja)
- Special Agent Oso^{⹋} (Oso: Agjenti special)
- Spheres (Akualuna: S.F.E.R.A.T.)
- Spider-Man (Njeriu merimangë)
- Spider-Man: The New Animated Series (Njeriu merimangë)
- Spirit Riding Free^{⹋} (Kali i eger Spirit)
- SpongeBob SquarePants^{‡} (Bob sfungjeri)
- Star Twinkle PreCure (Luftëtaret e bukura: Shkëlqimi i yjeve)
- Star vs the Forces of Evil^{⹋} (Ylli kundër forcave të së keqes)
- Storm Hawks (Fajkojtë e stuhisë)
- Strawberry Shortcake^{⹋} (Luleshtrydhe zemërëmbla)
- Strawberry Shortcake's Berry Bitty Adventures^{⹋} (Luleshtrydhe Zemërëmbla: Aventurat e Luleshtrydhes/Luleshtrydhja dhe aventurat në qyetetin e frutave)
- Stuart Little^{‡} (Stjuarti i vogël)
- Suite PreCure
- Super Buffalo (Super bualli)
- Super Robot Monkey Team Hyperforce Go^{⹋} (Skuadra e Super Robotëve Majmunë)
- Swirl Fighter^{‡} (Luftëtarët e fuqishëm)
- Tabaluga^{†}
- TaleSpin (Rrëfenja aventurash)
- Tayo the Little Bus^{‡} (Autobusi i vogël Tajo)
- Taz-Mania^{‡}
- Team Umizoomi^{‡} (Skuadra Umizumi)
- Teenage Mutant Ninja Turtles (2003 TV series) (Teenage Mutant Ninxha/Breshkat ninhxa)
- Teen Titans^{‡} (Titanët e rinj)
- Teen Titans Go!^{‡} (Forca titanët e rinj/Forca, Adoleshentë Titanë)
- The Adventures of Jimmy Neutron, Boy Genius^{‡} (Aventurat e Xhimi Neutron: Djali gjeni)
- The Adventures of Little Brown Bear^{‡} (Aventurat e arushit të vogël)
- The Adventures of Puss in Boots^{⹋} (Aventurat e maçokut me çizme)
- The Angry Beavers^{‡} (Kastorët e zemëruar)
- The Backyardigans^{‡} (Çamarrokët e vegjël)
- The Berenstain Bears (Arinjtë Berenstein)
- The Buzz on Maggie^{‡} (Gumezhimat mbi Megin/Gumëzhima Megi)
- The Emperor's New School^{⹋} (Kusko: Perandori shkon në shkollë)
- The Epic Tales of Captain Underpants^{⹋} (Tregimet epike të kapiten Brekushit/Tregimet epike të kapiten Brekushit në hapësirë)
- Enchanted Lands: The Magic of the Faraway^{†} ^{⹋} (Pema e tokës së largët)
- The Ghost and Molly McGee^{⹋} (Moli dhe fantazma)
- The Lion Guard^{⹋} (Garda e luanit)
- The New Adventures of Peter Pan (Aventurat e reja të Piter Pani)
- The New Adventures of Winnie the Pooh (Aventurat e reja të Uini Puh)
- The New Scooby-Doo Movies
- The New Woody Woodpecker Show (Shfaqja e Woody Woodpecker/Udi Qukapiku)
- The Penguins of Madagascar (Pinguinët e Madagaskarit)
- The Pink Panther Show (Pantera rozë)
- The Pinky and Perky Show (Shfaqja e Pinkit dhe Perkit)
- The Road Runner Show^{‡} (Zogu vrapues)
- The Save-Ums! (Shpëtimtarët)
- The Smurfs (Pufët)
- The Spaghetti Family (Familja spageti)
- The Sylvester & Tweety Mysteries^{‡} (Misteret e Tutit dhe Silvestres)
- The Tick (Morri)
- The Tom and Jerry Show (1975 TV series)^{‡} (Shfaqja e Tomit dhe Xherrit)
- The Tom and Jerry Show (2014)^{⹋} (Shfaqja e Tomit dhe Xherrit)
- The Twins of Destiny^{‡} (Binjakët e fatit)
- The World of David the Gnome^{‡} (Xhuxhi David miku im)
- Thomas & Friends^{‡} (Tomas Lokomotiva dhe shokët)
- Timon & Pumbaa^{†} ^{‡} (Timon dhe Pumba)
- Tiny Toon Adventures^{†} (Krishtlindje me kartonat)
- Tokyo Mew Mew^{‡} (Luftëtaret mace)
- Tom and Jerry Tales (Tomi dhe Xherri)
- Tom and Jerry (Tomi dhe Xherri)
- Totally Spies!^{†} (Spiunet e tmerrshme)
- Trains^{⹋} (Qyteti i trenave)
- Trolls: The Beat Goes On!^{⹋} (Trolët: Ritmi vazhdon)
- Trollhunters: Tales of Arcadia^{⹋} (Gjuetarët e trolëve)
- Tron: Uprising^{⹋} (Troni: Kryengritja)
- True and the Rainbow Kingdom^{⹋} (Tru dhe mbretëria e ylberit)
- TuTiTu^{⹋}
- Uki^{‡}
- Ulysses 31 (Odisea në hapësirë)
- Vampirina^{⹋} (Vampiriana)
- Van Dogh (Van Dog)
- VeggieTales^{†} ^{‡} (Perimet/Rrëfenja perimesh/Tregimet e perimeve)
- Vipo: Adventures of the Flying Dog^{‡} (Vipo: Aventurat e qenit fluturues)
- Vroomiz^{⹋} (Makinat e vogla)
- Wander Over Yonder^{⹋} (Shëtitësi i vogël)
- Waybuloo^{‡} (Urra)
- What's New, Scooby-Doo? (Scooby Doo: Kërkime të çmendura)
- Wide-Eye (Buf symadhi)
- WinneToons (Vinituns)
- Wishenpoof! (Prekje magjike)
- W.I.T.C.H.^{⹋} (Luftëtaret mbrojtëse U.I.T.K.H)
- Witchy Pretty Cure! (Luftëtaret e bukura magjistare)
- Wolfboy and the Everything Factory^{⹋} (Djali-ujk dhe fabrika gjithçkabërëse)
- Wonder Pets!^{‡} (Kafshët fantastike)
- X-Men: The Animated Series^{†} (Njerëzit-X)
- Yu-Gi-Oh! 5D's (Ju Gi O 5D's)
- Yu-Gi-Oh! Duel Monsters^{‡} (Ju Gi Oh)
- Yu-Gi-Oh! Arc-V (Ju Gi O! Ark-V: Harku i fitore)
- Yu-Gi-Oh! Capsule Monsters (Ju Gi O! Përbindëshat e kapsulës)
- Yu-Gi-Oh! GX^{‡} (Ju Gi O! GX)
- Yu-Gi-Oh! Zexal (Ju Gi Oh! Zeksal!)
- Zheng He's Voyages to the West Seas (Udhëtimi i Zheng Hi drejt deteve të perëndimit)
- Zoofari^{⹋} (Udhëtim me kafshët)
