= Little Brown Bear (book series) =

Children's book series

- Author: Claude Lebrun; Danièle Bour
- Language: French
- Publication date: 1975
- Publication place: France

Little Brown Bear (French: Petit Ours Brun) is a series of short illustrated stories for children telling the story of a brown bear cub surrounded by its parents. It began appearing in 1975 in Pomme d'Api magazine and in picture book form published by Bayard. It was created by Claude Lebrun and illustrated by Danièle Bour. Various writers have succeeded its creator, including Marie Aubinais.

The series has spawned three animated series and a musical.

== History ==
The character of Little Brown Bear was created in the 1970s by Claude Lebrun, a literature teacher at the Chateaubriand high school in Rennes, who was tired of telling her children classic tales. She quickly contacted the children's magazine Pomme d'Api and suggested the story of a bear who makes good resolutions for his third birthday: get dressed alone, set the table, go to the potty. The positive reactions of readers delighted with this story led to the character's continued existence. He was reworked by the editorial staff with psychologists, focusing on his private life, a novelty at the time, dominated by adventure stories and humorous characters. Between 1975 and the early 1980s, Claude Lebrun published around forty of these stories, all illustrated by the artist Danièle Bour, who used a refined, colorful design that was easy for young children to read. In the 1980s, the series was almost discontinued. However, from 1984, Marie Aubinais succeeded Claude Lebrun as screenwriter of Little Brown Bear, who returned to his job as a teacher.

== Little Brown Bear outside of literature ==
Several TV series feature the character Little Brown Bear. The first, called Little Brown Bear, was in 1988 (100 episodes), the second, called The Adventures of Little Brown Bear, was in 2003 (52 episodes), and the third, called Little Brown Bear or Little Brown Bear 3D, was in 2018 (52 episodes).

The firm opposition between the genders, between a masculine exterior space and a feminine domestic space, as well as a reduced vision of intimate love are highlighted for the second series.

In 2007 Bayard asked YouTube to remove the videos of Little Brown Bear that the sharing site was broadcasting without authorization. With no response from YouTube, Bayard took the matter to court. In 2009, YouTube was ordered to pay 60,000 euros to Bayard Presse for having broadcast Petit Ours Brun without authorization and having taken time to remove it.

There is a Little Brown Bear musical created in 2016, as well as numerous derivative products (puzzles, dishes, sheets, stuffed animals, etc.).
