= Patta Potta Monta =

Japanese anime television series

- Going Wild, Going Green

パッタ ポッタ モン太 (Patta Potta Monta)
- Anime television series
- Directed by: Yusaku Saotome
- Produced by: Kiyomitsu Aoki
- Written by: Kazuhisa Sakaguchi
- Music by: Hiroshi Takaki
- Studio: Tokyo Kids
- Licensed by: NA: GD Multimedia Eternal Pictures
- Original network: Chiba TV
- English network: Smile
- Original run: August 1, 2006 – January 30, 2007
- Episodes: 26

Patta Potta Monta (パッタ ポッタ モン太) is a children's anime series. It aired in Japan between August 1, 2006, and January 30, 2007, on Chiba TV. The show was made as commemoration of the 15th anniversary of production company Tokyo Kids. The series follows a group of anthropomorphic animal characters who used to reside in the city suddenly transplanted to the country (Monta Island) where they attempt to adapt to life and learn important lessons.

An English dub of all 26 episodes called Going Wild, Going Green was produced by Bright Way Productions for GD Multimedia and Eternal Pictures. The dub aired in the United States on various Christian television networks Smile and on Parables TV where it was available on demand.

== Characters ==
- Monta (モン太), Monty in the English dub, was voiced by Yukiko Iwai.
- Mondo (モンド), Rocko in the English dub, was voiced by Kazuya Ichijō.
- Monjiro (モン次郎), Chester in the English dub, was voiced by Rikako Yamaguchi.

== Episodes ==
EP#	English title Japanese	Japanese air date
1	Carefree Island / The Mysterious Dr Sparks のほん島ってどこ!? / ガリガリ博士と不思議な実	August 1, 2006
2	My Sweet Cell Phone / The Chief of Idle Village あま〜い ケータイ / ひまだ村の村長さん	August 8, 2006
3	Flora's Flower Garden / Master Tiger's Secret フローラの花畑 / タイガー親方の秘密	August 15, 2006
4	Go Home Hermit Scape Goat / Goodbye Idle Village ヤギ仙人現る / バイバイ、ひまだ村	August 22, 2006
5	Forgotten Treasure / Our Secret Hideaway 思い出せない宝物 / 俺達の秘密基地?	August 29, 2006
6	The Artist of Idle Village / The Haunted Manson in Idle Village ひまだ村の芸術家 / ひまだ村のおばけ屋敷	September 5, 2006
7	Monkichi's Hammer / Summer Camp, Here We Come! モン吉のカナヅチ / 楽しいぞ!サマーキャンプ	September 12, 2006
8	The Mystery Fruit / Torogoro in Trouble 不思議なくだもの / トドゴロー、大ピンチ	September 19, 2006
9	Their Little Adventure / Miss Lilly ふたりの小さな旅 / リリーお姉さん	September 26, 2006
10	Runaway Alarm Clock / The Truth About Chuzo 逃げ出した目覚まし時計 / チューゾオの真実	October 3, 2006
11	走れ!コンゴ / モモコの似顔絵	October 10, 2006
12	光る魚を探せ / 光る魚の正体	October 17, 2006
13	ソーラなんて大嫌い / 激突! 自転車レース	October 24, 2006
14	ゾウシローは心配性 / 冬のお祭り	October 31, 2006
15	Mrs Tiger's Knitting Class / Attack Of The Tomatoes マミーの編み物教室 / トマトの惑星?	November 7, 2006
16	迷惑なリフォーム / ふたりのモモコ	November 14, 2006
17	疲れるかくれんぼ / 大人の扉	November 21, 2006
18	タイガーソンの家出 / 南の島から来た男	November 28, 2006
19	お姉ちゃんズルい! / ラアコの青い石	December 5, 2006
20	親切は重かった! / みんな知ってる	December 12, 2006
21	届かない水 / スケート♡スイスイ	December 19, 2006
22	のほん島のクリスマス / 世にも怖いクリスマス	December 26, 2006
23	迷子のソーラ / みんなで糸電話	January 9, 2007
24	パニック! タイガーソン / 雪合戦	January 16, 2007
25	モモネとハナちゃん / さびしいってなに?	January 23, 2007
26	モン太都会に帰る / おかえり	January 30, 2007

== International releases ==
Country/Region	Channel	Series premiere	Title in country	Language
Japan (Original)	Chiba TV; Kids Station; Teletama; Niigata Sogo Television	August 1, 2006; August 6, 2006; November 27, 2006	パッタ ポッタ モン太 (Patta Potta Monta)	Japanese
Albania	Çufo; Bang Bang	Unknown	Të bëhesh i egër	Albanian
(Arab League) Arab World	Basma	September 30, 2019?	المغامرون الصغار (Al-mġāmrūn Al-ṣġār)	Arabic
France	Boomerang	Early 2010s	Unknown	French
Iran	IRIB TV2	Unknown	سفر به روستای کوچولوها (Safar Bah Rostaye Kucholveya)	Persian
South Korea	Cartoon Network	July 30, 2007	팔짝 팔짝 몬타 (Paljjak Paljjak Monta)	Korean
Taiwan	MY KIDS TV	July 4, 2011	劈哩啪啦猴太 (Pīlī Pālā Hóutài)	Mandarin
United States	Smile	July 2008 – April 2012	Going Wild, Going Green	English
