= Junior (Albanian TV channel) =

Albanian television channel

- Country: Albania
- Broadcast area: Albania; Kosovo; North Macedonia; Montenegro
- Headquarters: Tirana, Albania

Programming
- Language: Albanian
- Picture format: 16:9 (576i, SDTV)

Ownership
- Owner: DigitAlb
- Sister channels: Bang Bang; Çufo

History
- Launched: April 20, 2005; 21 years ago

Links
- Website: www.digitalb.al

Junior (formerly known as Junior TV) is an Albanian private television network for kids and teenagers between the ages 10–18 years old. It was launched on April 20, 2005 by the TV platform DigitAlb. Junior TV is the second Albanian-language TV channel dedicated to kids after Bang Bang, and it is one of the most watched television channels by pre-teens and teenagers.

== Programming ==
=== Disney shows ===
- Austin & Ally (Austin dhe Eli)
- Cory in the House (Kori në shtëpinë e bardhë)
- Even Stevens (Stivensat)
- Good Luck Charlie (Paç fat Çarli)
- Hannah Montana (Hana Montana)
- Jessie (Xhesi)
- Jonas (Xhonas)
- K.C. Undercover (K.C. Agjentja sekrete)
- Liv and Maddie (Liv dhe Medi)
- Lizzie McGuire (Lizi Mekguajer)
- Shake It Up (Kërcim për një ëndërr)
- Sonny with a Chance (Soni mes yjesh)
- That's So Raven (Rejven)
- The Suite Life of Zack & Cody (Jeta në suitë e Zakut dhe Kodit)
- The Suite Life on Deck (Zaku dhe Kodi në anije)
- Violetta (Violeta)
- Wizards of Waverly Place (Magjistarët e sheshit Uejverli)

=== Nickelodeon shows ===
- 100 Things to Do Before High School (100 gjëra për t'u bërë para gjimnazit)
- Bella and the Bulldogs (Bela dhe Bulldogët)
- Big Time Rush (Big Time Rush: Banda muzikore)
- Every Witch Way (Ema, një shtrigë ëndrrash)
- Game Shakers (Krijuesit e lojrave)
- Henry Danger (I rrezikshmi Henri)
- iCarly (Unë Karli)
- Isa TKM (Isa TDSH)
- Isa TK+ (Isa TDSH, sezoni 2)
- Sam & Cat (Semi dhe Keti)
- School of Rock (Shkolla e rrokut)
- See Dad Run (Në shtëpi me babin)
- Talia in the Kitchen (Talia në kuzhinë)
- The Haunted Hathaways (Shtëpia e fantazmave)
- The Thundermans (Familja Thunderman)
- The Troop (Skuadra Anti-Monstër)
- True Jackson, VP (Tru Xhekson)
- Victorious (Fitimtare)

=== Other shows ===
- Balamory (Balamori)
- Being Eve (Të jesh Eva)
- Big Cook, Little Cook (Kuzhinieri i madh dhe kuzhinieri i vogël)
- Brum (Brami)
- Detetives do Prédio Azul (Detektivët e Ndërtesës Blu)
- Galidor: Defenders of the Outer Dimension
- Hi-5 (Tjeta-5)
- LazyTown (Qyteti i përtacëve)
- L'Italiano in Famiglia (Italishtja në familje)
- Little Miss Perfect
- Lola...Érase una vez (Na ishte njëherë Lola)
- Make It or Break It (Gjimnastet olimpike)
- Malcolm in the Middle (Malkolmi)
- Patito Feo (Bota e Patit)
- Popland!
- Sabrina, the Teenage Witch (Sabrina, shtriga adoleshente)
- Suburgatory (Periferia)
- Switched at Birth (Këmbyer në lindje)
- The Fresh Prince of Bel-Air (Princi i Bel-Air)
- The Greenhouse
- The Saddle Club (Klubi i kalorëseve)
- The Simpsons (Simpsonët)
- The Tribe (Tribu)
- Tin Man (Njeriu prej teneqeje)

=== Original productions ===
- DigiTime
- Hapa në pasarelë
- Junior Club
- Kompjuteri im
- Little Miss Perfect
- Muzikal në Junior
- Planeti Kripëmjaltëzat
- Prodhime 100% Shqiptare
- Yjet e muzikës
- Super Junior

== See also ==
- DigitAlb
- Television in Albania
