= Eternal Pictures =

- Company type: Film distribution
- Founded: 1998
- Headquarters: Coral Springs, Florida, United States

Eternal Pictures was an American independent film distribution company, which distributed Christian, family and documentary films. The company distributed Tugger: The Jeep 4X4 Who Wanted To Fly in South Africa, and distributed Wemmicks, The Storykeepers and Hermie and Friends in Brazil.

== Distribution filmography ==
=== Animation and Family ===
- Once Upon a Stable
- The Lion of Judah
- Tugger: The Jeep 4X4 Who Wanted To Fly
- Going Wild, Going Green
- Jungle Beat
- The Legend of the Sky Kingdom

=== Drama ===
- The Visual Bible: Acts
- The Visual Bible: Matthew
- The Gospel of John
- The Silent Fall

=== Documentary ===
- Xtreme Life
- The Lazarus Phenomenon
- The Final Frontier
- Our Search for Sodom and Gomorrah
- Real Discoveries Near the Dead Sea
- Our Search for Tomb of Jesus
