= Engie Benjy =

British children's television series

- Genre: Animation; Children's animation
- Created by: Bridget Appleby
- Written by: Sascha Paladino; Melinda LaRose; Nathan Cockerill; Jonathan Davis; Christian Donlan; Robin Kingsland; Marc Seal; Gillian Corderoy; Anthony Hatfield; Colin Davies
- Directed by: Chris Taylor; Lyndon Evans
- Starring: Ant and Dec; Les Dennis; Teresa Gallagher; David Holt
- Opening theme: "Engie Benjy" by Clint Boon
- Ending theme: "Engie Benjy" by Clint Boon (Instrumental)
- Composer: Rowland Lee
- Country of origin: United Kingdom
- Original language: English
- No. of series: 4
- No. of episodes: 52

Production
- Executive producer: Mark Hall
- Producers: Bridget Appleby; Debbie Peers
- Running time: 10 minutes (Series 1-2); 11 minutes (Series 3-4)
- Production company: Cosgrove Hall Films

Original release
- Network: ITV (CITV)
- Release: 4 September 2002 – 29 November 2004

Engie Benjy is a British stop motion animated pre-school children's television series produced by Cosgrove Hall Films for ITV's strand, CITV. The series aired from September 2002 until November 2004, airing for four series and fifty-two episodes.

== Characters ==
The series features a wide range of characters, from the main humans to the vehicles.

=== Main ===
- Engie Benjy (voiced by Declan Donnelly), The main protagonist of the series, he is a blue-haired mechanic who fixes problems with his friends' vehicles.
- Jollop the Dog (vocal effects by Anthony McPartlin), Engie Benjy's pet dog.
- Dan the Van, Engie Benjy's breakdown van.
- Trucker Troy (voiced by Anthony McPartlin), Engie Benjy's cousin and the owner of Big Rig the Truck. He was introduced in the third series as another character that McPartlin could voice following a pay dispute.

=== Recurring ===
- Pilot Pete (voiced by Les Dennis), the owner of Plane.
- Astronaut Al (voiced by Les Dennis), the owner of Spaceship.
- Driver Dottie (voiced by Teresa Gallagher), the owner of Bus.
- Messenger Mo (voiced by David Holt), the owner of Bike.
- Farmer Fred (voiced by David Holt), the owner of Tractor.
- Fisherman Fin (voiced by David Holt), the owner of Boat.

== Episodes ==
=== Series 1 (2002) ===
No. overall	No. in season	Title	Written by	Original release date
1	1	"Jollop to the Rescue"	Gillian Corderoy	4 September 2002
Pilot Pete brings Plane, who has hiccups, to be mended by Engie Benjy. But Jollop's cousin Jelly gives Plane the wrong hiccup mixture, sending him into a spin. Note: This is Jelly's only appearance.
2	2	"Sleepwalking"	Gillian Corderoy	11 September 2002
Bus arrives in the middle of the night without Dottie. She is 'sleepdriving', so Engie Benjy and the team must steer her home without waking her up.
3	3	"Panic at Sea"	Christian Donlan and Johnathan Davis	18 September 2002
After a big storm, Boat and Fisherman Fin are confronted with an emergency.
4	4	"Lift Off Day"	Christian Donlan and Johnathan Davis	25 September 2002
Pilot Pete has to go to Plane in a hurry, but there is a problem with the lifts. When one of his lifts goes down, the other goes up, so how will he ever get to Plane?
5	5	"Painting Spaceship"	Colin Davis	2 October 2002
Spaceship is having a new coat of paint and to commemorate the special event, Engie Benjy has organised a big party.
6	6	"Plane Come Home"	Christian Donlan and Johnathan Davis	9 October 2002
Pilot Pete wakes up one morning to find that Plane is missing. Engie Benjy suggests that they look for him inside Sofa Mountain, where they find that Plane has made a new friend.
7	7	"The Spot"	Janys Chambers	16 October 2002
Bus has a large blue spot on her front, which makes her embarrassed, so Driver Dottie calls Engie Benjy for help.
8	8	"Dirty Windows"	Gillian Corderoy	23 October 2002
Astronaut Al tries to clean Spaceship's windows in mid-air, but he falls out and lands inside Engie Benjy's garage. Now, Spaceship is whizzing around out of control.
9	9	"Jollop Mixtures"	Janys Chambers	30 October 2002
Jollop accidentally breaks the Vehicle Distress Alarm and mixes up the pictures. Now Engie Benjy does not know if it's Farmer Fred and Tractor or Pilot Pete and Plane who are in trouble.
10	10	"A Message for Bike"	Janys Chambers	6 November 2002
Bike feels unloved and refuses to deliver messages, so Engie Benjy arranges for Fisherman Fin, Pilot Pete and Astronaut Al to send Bike messages to tell him how much they appreciate him.
11	11	"Job Swap"	Gillian Corderoy	13 November 2002
Dottie and Fred quarrel over who has the easiest job, so Engie Benjy suggests that they try each other's job for a day.
12	12	"Jollop Alone"	Janys Chambers	20 November 2002
Engie Benjy's friends plan a surprise birthday party for him in the garage, so while he is out helping his friends, Engie leaves Jollop in charge of the garage.
13	13	"New Shoes for Spaceship"	Christian Donlan and Johnathan Davis	27 November 2002
Spaceship's old shoes are worn out and, when Farmer Fred grows him some new ones, he refuses to try them on.

=== Series 2 (2003) ===
No. overall	No. in season	Title	Written by	Original release date
14	1	"Buses Need Holidays Too"	Christian Donlan and Johnathan Davis	9 September 2003
Bus and Driver Dottie take all their friends to the seaside for a well-earned break. But Engie Benjy soon finds that Bus needs a holiday more than anyone else does.
15	2	"Night Light"	Janys Chambers	11 September 2003
When Pilot Pete and Astronaut Al find Plane and Spaceship missing at night, they call Engie Benjy for help.
16	3	"Bad Hand Day"	Gillian Corderoy	16 September 2003
Engie Benjy, Jollop and Dan the Van can always help...or can they? What will they do when it's Dan who needs help?
17	4	"Check Up Day"	Christian Donlan and Johnathan Davis	18 September 2003
Engie Benjy's friends bring their vehicles to the garage for a check-up. Everyone comes except Boat, who really needs help more than any of the others.
18	5	"Pete's New Plane"	Janys Chambers	23 September 2003
Plane gets upset when Pete takes a shiny new plane out to play instead of him, so Engie Benjy has to put things right.
19	6	"Blooming Balloons"	Christian Donlan and Johnathan Davis	25 September 2003
While Engie Benjy is mending Tractor, Jollop accidentally grows a huge balloon and gets carried away.
20	7	"Silly Bus Mood"	Gillian Corderoy	30 September 2003
Bus is behaving strangely, so Driver Dottie leaves her at the garage while she goes shopping. Will the Team work out the Silly Bus Mood cure in time?
21	8	"Gobstoppers"	Janys Chambers	2 October 2003
Engie Benjy runs out of roly poly pogle balls at the worst possible time, as Spaceship and Tractor need some new ones. Luckily, he finds a substitute for them: gobstoppers.
22	9	"Who's Been Landing on My Mountain?"	Janys Chambers	7 October 2003
Pilot Pete suspects that someone has been landing on Plane's special parking place.
23	10	"Boat Takes a Trip"	Bridget Appleby and Colin Davis	9 October 2003
Boat feels left out because she can't go to Plane's birthday party, but Engie Benjy finds a way for her to join in the fun.
24	11	"Astronaut Jollop"	Christian Donlan and Johnathan Davis	14 October 2003
Jollop and Dan try to be helpful and manage without Engie when Spaceship has a problem to solve.
25	12	"Ice Fishing"	Christian Donlan and Johnathan Davis	16 October 2003
Boat gets frozen into the icy harbour, and Engie Benjy must warm her up. But how can the team bring her back to land?
26	13	"Snow Fun"	Christian Donlan and Johnathan Davis	21 October 2003
Spaceship is stranded when his springs fall out after too much bouncing on Sofa Mountain.

=== Series 3 (2004) ===
No. overall	No. in season	Title	Written by	Original release date
27	1	"The Big Sleep"	Sascha Paladino	22 March 2004
Everyone's planning a party for Trucker Troy and Big Rig's arrival, but when Big Rig is too tired to get to the garage, the team must figure out how to help him make it over the hill. Note 1: This episode introduced Trucker Troy and his truck "Big Rig". Note 2: From this episode onward, Engie Benjy speaks to the audience (with kids talking in the background) and asks them for help.
28	2	"Sky Ball"	Nathan Cockerill	29 March 2004
Bike becomes upset when he can't join the game of Skyball. Spaceship and Plane are playing around the lighthouse, so Engie and the team must figure out a way for Bike to become part of the game by attaching rockets and wings to him.
29	3	"Flying High"	Christian Donlan and Johnathan Davis	5 April 2004
When Plane has a crash and hurts himself, the team must help him feel better - and help him get over a fear of flying again.
30	4	"Bus for a Day"	Robin Kingsland	7 April 2004
Plane wants to be more like Bus, so he tries to act like her, until the team helps him figure out that he is the only one who can solve a specific crisis, by using him special skills. Note: Postponed from the start of series 3.
31	5	"Spaceship Blues"	Marc Seal	19 April 2004
Spaceship is sad today because Al is leaving for the afternoon, so the team must help him come up with strategies for dealing with the separation until Al returns with a surprise.
32	6	"Harvest Helpers"	Gillian Corderoy	21 April 2004
Tractor is trying to harvest all the ice lollies before they melt, all by himself but it's too much work for one vehicle, so the team must help him figure out how to use teamwork and share the load.
33	7	"Traffic Trouble"	Antony Hatfield	7 April 2004
Big Rig and Bus block each end of a narrow bridge, both determined to cross first refusing to give way until Engie and the team help them learn how to take turns.
34	8	"Boat's Fishy Friend"	Colin Davis	21 April 2004
Fisherman Fin calls the team because Boat won't budge from a small island in the middle if the water. Boat is taking care of a fish that she's found in a small pool. But when the tide starts to go out the team must find a way to get Boat and the fish back into the water.
35	9	"A Horn for Spaceship"	Nathan Cockerill	28 April 2004
Big Rig has lost his horn.
36	10	"Cupcake Catchers"	Christian Donlan and Johnathan Davis	5 May 2004
Tractor has accidentally sneezed all of Farmer Fred's quick growing cupcake seeds away on the wind, and they've started growing all over the place. Tractor is worried about how he's going to find all the cupcakes before it gets dark, until Engie and the team figure out how to turn it into a game: a treasure hunt.
37	11	"The Donut Downpour"	Nathan Cockerill	10 May 2004
Engie Benjy can't work out why it's raining doughnuts, until he catches Plane having great fun flying around dropping doughnuts on everyone. After the team helps Plane realise how naughty her behaviour is, Plane must make amends to Farmer Fred by helping him plant more doughnuts.
38	12	"Double Trouble"	Robin Kingsland	12 May 2004
Big Rig has got stuck in a honey puddle. Nearby, Bike has ended up caught on a purple rock. Big Rig and Bike simultaneously need Engie and the team's special skills to help get them out of their jams. At first, they shuttle back and forth trying to help Big Rig and Bike.
39	13	"Boisterous Bike"	Antony Hatfield	17 May 2004
After Bike gets overexcited playing a game, Engie has to calm him down so that he can deliver his packages on time.

=== Series 4 (2004) ===
No. overall	No. in season	Title	Written by	Original release date
40	1	"Share and Share Alike"	Gillian Corderoy	6 September 2004
When Plane and Bike run out of engine juice, Engie takes them to an engine juice fountain where the pair learns how to share the juice with one another.
41	2	"The Great Race"	Marc Seal	13 September 2004
Engie is called by Pete, because Pete wants him to give Plane a tune-up for her big race with Spaceship. During the race, Spaceship zooms around overconfidently, while Plane flies steadily with determination.
42	3	"Big Rig's Big Mess"	Christian Donlan and Johnathan Davis	20 September 2004
Everyone wants to go to the Barnacle Barbecue at the harbour, but they can't get there because a big mess is blocking the road. Big Rig has dumped his things out of the trailer and doesn't want to tidy up.
43	4	"The Sea Sneezes"	Nathan Cockerill	27 September 2004
Engie is called to Fin's, where Boat is having trouble playing because she has the sea sneezes.
44	5	"Splish Splash Bus"	Christian Donlan and Johnathan Davis	4 October 2004
It's raining outside, and the harbour is overflowing to the point where Mo's house is about to get flooded. Fisherman Fin needs his Water Woosher to bail out the water. Bus and Dottie are supposed to deliver it, but Bus is afraid to go outside in the rain.
45	6	"Jollop in the Driving Seat"	Gillian Corderoy	11 October 2004
When Engie gets a new Smart Cart to help with repairs, Jollop can't wait to try it out. But when Jollop takes off in the Smart Cart without waiting for Engie to teach him how to use it, it's up to Dan and Engie to catch up with him.
46	7	"The Big Kite Flight"	Robin Kingsland	18 October 2004
When Spaceship gets a new kite all the other vehicles want to use it. Spaceship agrees to share but when the vehicles all want to go first the kite takes off, with Bike tangled up in it!
47	8	"Lost Horizon"	Colin Davis	25 October 2004
Driver Dottie and Bus are lost in the cotton candy fog with Pete and Al as passengers.
48	9	"The Night Flight"	Marc Seal	1 November 2004
Engie and the team are called to Pilot Pete and Plane's as Plane is about to take his first night flight. The team discover that there's nothing wrong with Plane, but Pete is afraid of the dark.
49	10	"Snow Daze"	Antony Hatfield	8 November 2004
It's a snowy day, and Engie and the team are called to the top of Sofa Mountain to help Spaceship. The team solve the problem easily but Jollop sleds down the mountain and gets stuck in a tree. Engie must help Dan overcome his fear of sledding in order to get Jollop down from the tree.
50	11	"Night of the Sherbert Stars"	Nathan Cockerill	15 November 2004
Everyone is going to the top of Sofa Mountain to see the Sherbert Stars, which only come out once a year. Engie and the team are called out to help Bike with a simple problem, but things get complicated when Dan and Jollop argue and won't work together.
51	12	"Dan Day"	Melinda Richards	22 November 2004
Dan gets stuck in the ice on his birthday, so Engie comes up with a plan to get him to his party on time.
52	13	"Hide and See Saw"	Christian Donlan and Johnathan Davis	29 November 2004
Everyone's playing hide and seek today, but Big Rig is really upset. He's too big to hide anywhere so he keeps getting found. It's up to Engie and the team to help Big Rig find the perfect hiding place.

== Development ==
The theme tune was composed and sung by Clint Boon, the keyboard player with the Inspiral Carpets.

The show was created by Bridget Appleby at Cosgrove Hall Films, and first shown on CITV, and it is also seen on Nick Jr. It also aired in Welsh on S4C. Four series of 13 episodes were made, with first broadcasts from 2002 to 2004. It has been sold in over 80 territories worldwide.

=== Broadcast ===
Internationally, the show aired in Australia on ABC and Nick Jr, TVNZ in New Zealand, Central in Singapore, Sveriges Television in Sweden, France 5 and Piwi+ in France, YLE in Finland, NRK in Norway, Discovery Kids in Latin America, RTP in Portugal, IRIB in Iran, NPO Zappelin in the Netherlands, Çufo, Bang Bang and Top Channel in Albania, Rai Yoyo in Italy, KIKA in Germany, Alter Channel in Greece, Hop! Channel in Israel, EBS in South Korea, TVP in Poland, Radio Television of Serbia in Serbia, Radio and Television of Slovakia in Slovakia, Télé-Quebec in Canada, Radiotelevizija Slovenija in Slovenia, Stöð 2 in Iceland and Sonce TV in Ukraine.

Reruns of the series aired on ITVBe's children's block LittleBe between September 2018 and July 2021.

=== Other appearances ===
In 2009, Engie Benjy along with several other well known children's characters appeared on The Official BBC Children in Need Medley by Peter Kay's Animated All Star Band.

== Merchandise ==
=== Home releases ===
The series has been released on VHS and DVD. Video Collection International and Granada Video released the first two series in four DVD and VHS volumes (two per series) while Granada Ventures released two DVDs containing the entirety of Series 3 and 4.

=== Video game ===
In May 2003, BBC Multimedia secured video game rights to the series from Granada Media. Later on in the year, they released Engie Benjy: Time for Teamwork for the PC. It was later re-released as a DVD game in 2006 by Shindo Production alongside other BBC Multimedia titles.
