= Little Brown Bear (2018 TV series) =

French animated television series

- Genre: Childrien television series
- Country of origin: France
- Original language: French
- No. of seasons: 1
- No. of episodes: 52

Production
- Running time: 7 minutes

Original release
- Release: 1 October 2018 – 2019

Little Brown Bear (French: Petit Ours Brun) is a French 3D animated television series in 52 episodes of 7 minutes, produced by Charles Sansonetti, assisted by Pierre-Emmanuel Besnard and Xavier Morelli, based on the series of short stories Little Brown Bear by Claude Lebrun and Danièle Bour, first published in the 1970s in Pomme d'Api the magazine for 3-7 year olds from the Bayard Presse.

== Plot ==
Little Brown Bear is a 3-year-old bear cub who has the emotions of a child between 2 and 4 years old.

== Broadcast ==
It was first broadcast from October 1, 2018 on France 5 in Zouzous.
