= Little Brown Bear =

- Based on: Little Brown Bear
- Country of origin: France
- Original language: French
- No. of seasons: 2
- No. of episodes: 100

Production
- Running time: 2 minutes

Original release
- Network: FR3; Canal J Canal Famille; Boomerang
- Release: 12 September 1988 – 3 January 1989

Little Brown Bear (French: Petit Ours Brun) is a French animated children's television series, in 100 episodes of two minutes and one minute, created from the eponymous character by Claude Lebrun, illustrated by Danièle Bour, who published her little hero in the Pomme d'Api magazine of the Bayard press group in 1975.

== Plot ==
The series focuses on Little Brown Bear, who experiences his very first adventures with the little ones and the older ones, sometimes getting into mischief.

== Broadcasting ==
The series Little Brown Bear was broadcast from September 12, 1988 on FR3. It was also broadcast in 1992 on Canal J and Boomerang.

In Quebec, the series is broadcast on Canal Famille.

In Arab World, the series is broadcast on Toyor Al-Janah on 2008.

== Observations ==
There is a reboot of this series which contains 52 episodes on France 5 and on TiJi: The Adventures of Little Brown Bear (2003-2004).

A 2nd reboot of Little Brown Bear is currently in the works.
