= The Adventures of Little Brown Bear =

- Genre: Children's television series
- Based on: Little Brown Bear by: Claude Lebrun; Danièle Bour
- Voices of: Jules de Jongh; Joanna Ruiz; Tony Clarke Hill
- Narrated by: Joanna Ruiz
- Country of origin: France
- Original languages: French; English
- No. of seasons: 1
- No. of episodes: 52

Production
- Running time: 3 minutes
- Production company: Bayard Presse

Original release
- Network: France 5
- Release: 20 October 2003 – 12 January 2004

The Adventures of Little Brown Bear (French: Les Aventures de Petit Ours Brun) is a French animated television series, created from the eponymous character by Claude Lebrun and Danièle Bour.

The series takes up the universe of the first adaptation, Little Brown Bear, broadcast from 1988.

== Synopsis ==
Through the adventures of a bear, this series depicts the life of a 3-year-old child in everyday and universal situations.

== Voice cast ==
Character	French voice	English voice
Little Brown Bear	Antoine Bonnaire	Jules de Jongh
Papa Bear	Pierre Forest	Tom Clarke-Hill
Mama Bear	Ivana Coppola	Joanna Ruiz
Narrator	Isabelle Giami	Joanna Ruiz

== Broadcast ==
It was broadcast between October 20, 2003, to January 12, 2004, with reruns airing until August 26, 2022, on France 5 in the show Les Zouzous then in the shows Ludo Zouzous, Zouzous and Okoo, but also on France 3 in the show France Truc on July 5, 2005, and Playhouse Disney then Disney Junior.

In Quebec, it was broadcast from September 13, 2004, on Télé-Québec.

=== International Airings ===
Countries	Networks
Turkey	TRT Çocuk
United Kingdom	CBBC; CITV
United States	PBS Kids
Canada	Knowledge Kids; TVOntario
Spain	Disney Jr Spain; Cartoon Network Spain; Canal Panda Spain
Germany	Super RTL; Toggolino
Italy	Rai Yoyo
Arab world	JCC TV (Now Jeem TV); Baraem; Television Algerian; Canal Algerie; Algerie 3 Gulli Bil Arabi
Japan	NHK
