= Princesse Shéhérazade =

- Genre: Adventure, Comedy, Fantasy
- Created by: Marie-France Brière
- Directed by: Françoise Bureau
- Theme music composer: Gérard Pullicino
- Opening theme: Princesse Shéhérazade
- Country of origin: France
- Original language: French
- No. of seasons: 2
- No. of episodes: 52

Production
- Producers: France 2 Carrere Group; Anabase Production; Télé-München
- Cinematography: Philippe Mest
- Running time: 25 minutes (approx.)

Original release
- Network: France 2 and France 3 (France); Rai 2 (Italy)
- Release: 21 December 1996

Princesse Shéhérazade (lit: Princess Sheherazade) was a French animated television series originally broadcast from 1996 until 2000 on the French TV channel France 2. It was later retransmitted in 2008 on channel France 5. Its production had the participation of the National Center of Cinematography and the support of Région Poitou Charentes. The opening theme was composed by Gérard Pullicino and was sung by Amina Annabi on its original version.

== Characters ==
- Shéhérazade
- Till
- Nour
- Fahrid
- Prince Silmane

== International dubbing ==
The animated television series has been dubbed into various languages. In addition to the original in French, the series was also released in English, German, Italian, European Spanish, Catalan, Mexican Spanish, Brazilian Portuguese, European Portuguese, Russian, Finnish, Norwegian, Turkish, Ukrainian and Arabic, although in the Arabic version the theme song was not dubbed in Arabic, but the original French opening theme song was retained - all speaking roles, however, were dubbed in Arabic.
