= Phantom Investigators =

- Created by: Stephen Holman; Josephine T. Huang
- Directed by: Stephen Holman; Josephine T. Huang
- Starring: Courtney Vineys; Alecsander Kocev; Andrew Decker; Amber Ross
- Composers: JD Reilly; Josh Myers
- Country of origin: United States
- Original language: English
- No. of seasons: 1
- No. of episodes: 13

Production
- Executive producers: Ilene Staple; Stephen Holman; Josephine T. Huang
- Producers: Ilene Staple; Josephine T. Huang; Kevin Murphy
- Running time: 21 minutes
- Production companies: Adelaide Productions; Columbia TriStar Television (W)holesome Productions

Original release
- Network: Kids' WB
- Release: May 25 – August 17, 2002

Phantom Investigators is an American children's animated series that aired on Kids' WB in 2002, premiering on May 25 and ending on August 17 for 13 episodes. It was created using a special mixture of stop motion (used for the main cast and the other citizens), puppetry (used for many of the supernatural creatures that are encountered), and live-action (used mainly for ghosts). The show was co-created by Stephen Holman, known for his work on Joe Normal for MTV's Liquid Television and Life with Loopy for Nickelodeon's KaBlam! which ran during all the duration, and Josephine T. Huang, known for her work on Bump in the Night and James and the Giant Peach.

In 2024, the series became available on the Indoor Recess YouTube channel.

== Synopsis ==
The show revolved around four 13-year-olds who attend Lugosi Junior High School in San Francisco. The group is known as The Phantom Investigators, or "P.I.s" for short, who solve supernatural mysteries that occur all over town ranging from ghost hauntings to demonic encounters. While leading double lives as P.I.s, the group must also balance everyday issues such as homework, personal hobbies and friendships.

== Characters ==
=== PI ===
- Daemona Prune (voiced by Courtney Vineys) is the leader of the Phantom Investigators. She is the only member who hides their identity by donning a mask and trench coat. Though lacking in supernatural powers, she utilizes her knowledge of the paranormal along with an assortment of gadgets to identify paranormal entities and vanquish them.
- Jericho (voiced by Alecsander Kocev) is the most laid back of the Phantom Investigators who loves physical activities such as skateboarding and martial arts, and utilizes telekinesis.
- Casey (voiced by Andrew Decker) is the most academically inclined member of the Phantom Investigators who has a love for sci-fi films and can shapeshift into anything.
- Kira Jones (voiced by Amber Ross) is the most empathic member of the Phantom Investigators who dreams of being a famous DJ with versatility in telepathy that allows her to communicate with others, probe minds, and influence people.

=== Companions ===
- Wad (voiced by Stephen Holman) is a gum-chewing sprite who was once a pixie named Todd but was demoted to a sprite as a punishment for his mischief.
- Jinxy (voiced by Stephen Holman) is a bad luck demon who reluctantly at times helps the Phantom Investigators by offering information about the Nether Realm and its entities.

=== Others ===
- Professor Felix Navarro (voiced by Richard Cansino) is a mentor to the Phantom Investigators and he supplies the P.I.s gadgets and vehicles from time to time to help with their investigations.
- Mr. & Mrs. Prune (voiced by Dave Mallow and Jessica Gee) are Daemona's parents who are unaware of Daemona's double life as a Phantom Investigator.
- Mustafa (portrayed by Stephen Chirazzi) is a former janitor of Lugosi Junior High turned ghost that resides in the school and offers information about the school and the paranormal to the P.I.s.
- Mary and Hal Prune are Daemona's grandparents and a members of the Mystery & Horror Book Club at Lugosi Junior High back in the 1950s but in reality were a Phantom Investigators, with Mary having telepathic, and Hal having teleportation abilities.

== Episodes ==
Phantom Investigators only ran for 6 weeks before Kids' WB pulled it from their schedule and replaced it with X-Men: Evolution. Holman said in a 2019 podcast interview that its cancellation came despite it being the top-rated program in its time slot because it failed to catch on with the demographic the network wanted. Kids' WB wanted to attract and maintain a strong viewership with young boys. Phantom Investigators was attracting more and more girls and losing the boys each successive week. After the cancellation, Sony cut the funding to the show killing any chance of finding a new network to take it on. The remaining episodes eventually aired outside the United States, first debuting on Teletoon in Canada.

1. Birthday Presence (airdate: May 25, 2002) - The most popular school kid suddenly finds himself haunted as he plans his annual birthday bash.
2. The Year of the Snake (airdate: June 1, 2002) – Tamagotchi like virtual pets become the fad around town but seem to have a hold over whoever plays with them.
3. Stall of Doom (airdate: June 8, 2002) – One of the bathroom stalls at Lugosi Junior High contains a gateway to the Nether Realm that sucks in students.
4. Were-Dog (airdate: June 15, 2002) – While disguised as a dog, Casey gets bitten by a werewolf and ends up unable to change back.
5. Demon Driver (airdate: June 22, 2002) – The team investigates an old car that was built with possessed parts and turns its driver into a reckless maniac.
6. Omega Pizza Pi (airdate: June 29, 2002) – Pizza deliverers are being terrorized by the ghosts of a 1960s fraternity under the control of a pizza-based demon.
7. Thank Wad – Wad is given 24 hours to prove he is worthy of restoration to his former status by dealing with a serious situation seriously or he will remain a chewing gum sprite forever.
8. Ghosts on Film – The ghost of an actor from an old black and white film believes they are a space tyrants and exits through a VCR looking to conquer the real world.
9. Skating the Plank – A local skateboarder makes themself a skateboard from the remains of a pirate ship and is then haunted by the ship's captain.
10. From Egypt with Love – A mummy contacts the Phantom Investigators to help him cross over into the afterlife.
11. Haunted Dreams – As Kira considers quitting the team, a girl comes to them suffering from haunted dreams.
12. The 5th P.I. – A new kid at school leads the P.I.s to think they found a new member, but he ends up being a Nether Realm cop intent on arresting them.
13. Secrets Exposed! – Someone from Navarro's past returns and leads to some revelations about him and his connection to the Phantom Investigators.
