= The Spaghetti Family =

- Genre: Animation, Family
- Created by: Bruno Bozzetto
- Written by: Bruno Bozzetto
- Country of origin: Italy
- Original language: Italian
- No. of series: 1
- No. of episodes: 52

Production
- Running time: 22 minutes
- Production companies: The Animation Band; SEK Studio; Mondo TV; Rai Fiction

Original release
- Network: Rai 3 Rai Gulp
- Release: December 21, 2003

The Spaghetti Family (Italian: La famiglia Spaghetti) is an Italian animated television series created by Bruno Bozzetto and produced by The Animation Band, Mondo TV and Rai Fiction, and animated by SEK Studio. It debuted on Rai 3 in December 2003.

The show was conceived in 1996 by Bozzetto, who was inspired by his family, and a pilot was shown at the first Cartoons on the Bay festival that year. The show won the Pulcinella d’Oro award at the 2003 Cartoons on the Bay.
