= Brady's Beasts =

Animated TV series (2005–2006)

- Based on: How to Care for Your Monster by Norman Bridwell
- Directed by: Gilles Deyriés
- Starring: Matt Devereaux; Candida Gubbins; Samantha Shaw; Felicity Duncan Smith; David Kitchen; Steve Edwin; Stephen Bent
- Composers: Tony Atkins; Terry Wilson; Mark Bradley; Justin Sherry; Mark Levinson
- Countries of origin: Canada; France; United Kingdom
- Original language: English
- No. of seasons: 1
- No. of episodes: 26 (52 segments)

Production
- Executive producers: Claude Berthier; Maureen Sery; Phil Littler; Louie Porco; Marie-Josée Corbail; Tom Tataranowicz; Greg Johnson
- Producers: Claude Berthier; Thierry Berthier; Phil Littler; Jean-Pierre Morin; Christine Côté
- Production companies: Vivatoon; Toon Factory; Monstercare Productions

Original release
- Network: YTV
- Release: March 25, 2005 – December 31, 2006

Brady's Beasts is an animated television series about a monster-loving boy named Brady Plunkett, who is the protagonist of the series. It premiered on March 25, 2005, on YTV. A total of 26 episodes were produced.

== Characters ==
=== Main ===
- Brady Plunkett is a monster-loving 12-year-old. He first discovered his "passion" when his sister Arlene told him there was a monster outside the window, and it turned out there was. He fed it, one thing led to another and the monster disappeared into Brady's closet, where he now lives that is until the first episode in which Brady is forced to chase him away for his own safety. Brady's ideal world would be one where humans and monsters can live together. Voiced by Candida Gubbins.
- Virgil Arp is Brady's 12-year-old best friend. He has been terrified of monsters since he was a child (though shown to be good friends with the Minotaur and tried the mummy as a pet once) and has not been seen to be very smart.
- Ember Tombs is 13 years old, and another friend of Brady's. She can be seen as creepy and obsessed with death. She sleeps with a voodoo doll. Voiced by Candida Gubbins.
- Arlene Plunkett is Brady's 17-year-old sister she originally got Brady interested in monsters when he was four. Brady often comes to Arlene for advice not knowing about the ways of the manipulative older sister only to be taken advantage of repeatedly. Strangely, she seems to be able to be hypnotised by her cell phone's ring tone.
- Maxwell Plunkett is Brady's miserable father. He has a long-running reputation as the cheapest man in Ravenville. He's highly anti-monster, seeing them as only another mouth to feed and often leads violent mobs in pursuit of monsters. He will not let a monster into his house unless he can profit from them. For instance, he gets free medical services from Dr. Jekyell. Voiced by Matt Devereaux.
- Pollyanna Plunkett is Brady's kind, sweet and gentle mother who is also highly accepting of monsters, seeing them less of a menace and more "cute" leading to her constantly getting taken advantage of. She is virtually fright-proof. Like her son Brady, she has a strong friendship with the Missing link.
- Mr. Mayor is an uptight, selfish and manipulative old tyrant that runs Ravenville. He would like nothing better than to ship the monsters off to the arctic, though he has a monster under his own roof—namely the Sea Serpent. Despite his unrivaled hatred of Brady, he is constantly calling him to help as Brady is the best available monster expert.
- Igor is the man behind the monster shop and is quick to con whomever he meets into buying any monster he wants. He is shown to be a good person helping Brady with whatever hair-brained monster stunt he comes up with although still cons him into using low quality monsters and equipment.
- Marvin and Gaye Plunkett/the twins Little is ever given about these two. They seem to communicate telepathically and only with one another and love pulling pranks on monsters like Maxwell loves money.

=== Monsters ===
- Stitch is a Frankenstein monster. According to Brady, he was "sewn together in a dark dank castle during a lightning storm" and is made of a wide array of parts taken from a wide number of "donors". He is shown to live at the dump and has a split personality disorder and is one of the most commonly occurring monsters in the series. He wanders around Ravenville freely and provides the muscle of many of Brady's missions. In "How to Remind Your Monster Who He Is" the twins remove a bolt from Stitch as a practical joke resulting in him sorting through his own memories trying to find which monster he is. This results in his dressing up and acting like many of the destructive monsters he has seen.
- Vlad is a vampire count from Transylvania of royal heritage who expects to be treated as such. He lives in a tree house in the forest and is trying to stop "sucking". He is shown to still drink blood on occasion, though goes out on a limb to quit doing things like donating blood to the local blood bank. He is one of the most frequently occurring monsters in the series, freely wandering around Ravenville. He once ran for mayor but lost on purpose as it was all just a ruse to get the mayor to make Ravenville more monster-friendly and is married to a Sapphire.
- The Mummy is a mummy straight from Egypt and lives in the museum vault in his sarcophagus. He was once the pet of Virgil as he tried to use him to impress a girl until he found out that she hates monsters in which he quickly conned the curator into taking him back he is a commonly occurring monster in the series freely walking around Ravenville to collect treasures for his tomb in the museum.
- The Werewolf is a lazy slacker who sells ice cream to children during the day and grows hair, chase cats and howl at the full moon during the night. He is shown to have a girlfriend namely a librarian werewolf and was first introduced in "How to Use Your Monster for Home Protection" in which Maxwell hired him as body guard for his valuables he is a commonly occurring monster freely walking around Ravenville strangely he's often seen in his werewolf form during the day.
- Brady's Monster – no actual name is ever given for this bizarre creature nor is it revealed what its species is. All that is ever revealed are a few facts about it slowly given throughout the series. It is shown that this creature is female (or possibly asexual) due to it giving birth yet strangely joined the ranks of monsters who are crushing on the newly tamed Howler. It is shown to have a bizarre craving for pumpkins and rotting meat as being among the things Brady uses to lure her back to his house third during its time with Brady she had a prized squeaky toy fourth she seems to like dank dark places as for a short time she hid in the Sewers Fifth she is shown to be a rare high quality specimen worth a lot of money in "How To Find Your Missing Monster" Brady inadvertently chased her away when she went to turn herself in after finding one of Brady's lost posters, only to be driven away by a frustrated Plunket family as they assumed she was wanting to buy the house. This may be the reason why she repeatedly runs away from Brady, though she's shown to still trust him as she gave him her baby to look after.
- The Hatchling sent Brady and friends on a wild trip across town after it hatched and is the baby of Brady's monster. The young creature provides a little insight as to what its mother looks like under its hood, a large beak mounted on a face with oversized eyes.
- Sparker can be best described as a living lightning bolt that was first seen in "how to unplug a Sparker" when the Plunket family rented it to power their house and eventually through one of the pranks by the twins via kite in a lightning storm the second time it came out as a hero when it plugged itself into a monster computer virus and in the process saved the town when it shorted out the Virus.
- Swamp Thing is a creature that lives in the Swamp of Ravenville though was once a pet to a young boy named Stanley Crum the Swamp Thing has three metamorphic stages: first a tadpole, second a frog like creature, and third a humanoid creature that walks on two legs apparently Swamp Things all have a soulmate with another Swamp Thing and was used to lure it back to the swamp via love song.
- Dr. Jekyll/Mr. Hyde is a monster that was once employed by Maxwell Plunket as a free doctor though it turned out that his free medical help was only a rouse to slowly turn Brady's family (excluding Brady and the Twins the latter was employed to him and the first suspicious of how no matter how much "medicine" was given to his family they just got worst and worst) into mutant monsters to be sold to Igor until he found out and got the twins to save the day by concocting an antidote it is unknown what exactly was the fate of the monster at the end of the episode though it's implied Brady imprisoned it in Igor's basement it was shown that the Arps (Virgils family) also fell victim to this con artist as they too were rescued by the Twins.
- Big Foot is a large hairy creature shown to have a crush on Arlene that was found in the Vomit Falls forest, Brady made a deal with a local man who had captured Brady's monster and was willing to trade for another. However the deal was that if Brady could deliver a monster just as dangerous as his monster to a man in Vomit Falls then the man would give Brady back his monster unfortunately the deal went south when the man saw that Big Foot was in love with Arlene and Brady's monster ran away yet again, leaving the man with an angry bigfoot.
  This is not the first bigfoot to be encountered; two more were seen at the end of "how to get rid of an undesirable monster" one was a baby and new pet to Stanly Crum the other the earliers mother who beat up the sheriff.
- Monster Mold is a giant creature that was once many smaller creatures that looked the same Brady along with just about every other kid in Ravenville made the smaller versions during Brady's web cast on his website Arlene and Maxwell mistaken Brady's mold as lime gelatin (causing the latter to have a major stomach ache) and Arlene took it to school as her cooking project after being refrigerated overnight and the kids mistaking this as instructions did the same this seemed to have caused all the blobs to form together to make a giant blob monster that swallowed up Arlene's teacher, Virgil and Mr. Mayor before swallowing every inflatable object Brady Virgil and Arlene could find then stuck a leaf blower into its side and inflated it and blew it up over the water leaving Virgil and Brady to clean up the mess made in the process and Arlene with a failing grade because her teacher had never been eaten by her meal before.
- Sea Serpent is a large green snake like creature that Grows when on dry land and shrinks in water Brady intended to capture the serpent as gift from him and Mr. Mayor to Mr. Mayor's son for his birthday. Originally Brady intended to lure the creature to the beach using a serpent love call then Virgil lured it to Mr. Mayors house using a Sea Serpent costume. Unfortunately the twins sabotaged the whistles into a sea serpent battle cry which made the serpent destroy the beach before chasing a terrified Virgil in a serpent costume to a football field where Brady soaked it using the sprinklers to trap it and release it into Mr. Mayor's house. A reporter at the scene commented, " getting his son a monster is one promise this mayor is going to keep".
- Banshee is a monster that was buried under the Plunket house and was put there by a man with the last name Plunket. This caused the Banshee to cast a spell on Brady's family to humiliate themselves via bad rapping and reversing their personality. The spell was lifted after Brady explained the mix up in which the man who buried her wisely changed his last name to protect his family.
- Wigs/Wiggario is a Yeti that sneaked into Brady's house, lured by the garbage Brady had in his closet since yeti's eat garbage. Brady named him Wigs because he resembled a blob of hair. Like all yeti's he also has a mortal enemy and snuck into the house to hide from him. After Arlene found out she blackmailed Brady into finding her a gorgeous date (threatening to tell Maxwell about Wigs and thus Brady would lose his computer) Brady then shaves Wigs and dresses him in one of Virgil's father's suits, transforming Wigs into Virgil's cousin Wiggario unfortunately Wigs' mortal enemy found him at Arlene's school where Wigs showed some backbone and clobbered him before taking a garbage coated Arlene to the dump for a date.
- Dylan is a Virtech who Brady and Virgil were hired to look after while his owner, Vanessa, was out of town. Virgil accidentally exposed Dylan to the artificial light of a refrigerator which caused him to mutate and multiply into terrifying and vicious monsters that destroyed Vanessa's house. Ember managed to come to the rescue by bringing Brady's Devilbeez (an electronic cross bow of some sort) which reverted the Virtechs back into one Dylan. Unfortunately due to the damage caused by Dylan's clones he had to reimburse Vanessa.
- Zombie was found in the cemetery where he just realized he was dead leaving a mystery since zombification is reserved only for criminals who have yet to pay for their crimes. Brady brought him home where he was employed by Maxwell as a free housekeeper. While he was alive the Zombie founded and ran an orphanage where a large amount of money went missing, apparently stolen by the janitor. Money begins disappearing around Brady's house as well it was revealed that the Zombie was responsible for the stolen money on both accounts. He then set things straight by returning all the stolen money it is unknown whether or not he was allowed to rest in peace.
- Punks/King Punk are a mutant strand of flying pumpkins purchased by Ember for Halloween (though it was unknown to her that they were mutants) from a company called Fear Factory who are known to make first rate terrors. They started terrorizing the Trick or Treaters of Ravenville to gather fear to spread all over the world that was being stored inside the King Punk. As predicted by Brady they deflate if someone laughs or stands up against them and Brady's monster manage to not only stand up to King Punk but eat it.
- Mr. Bones is a Skeleton that's all that remains of Ravenville's old dog catcher Mr. Bones. It broke his heart to see strays on the streets but after he caught the strays he abducted them right from their homes and made a giant cage out of every skeleton he could get his bony hands on including himself. After all the pets were returned to their owners Mr Bones was given Virgil's hamster and left Virgil to clean up his mess.
- Minotaur prefers to live in the sewers of Ravenville despite his one time fears of water, heights, clostrophobia, and darkness, Strangely all fears Virgil shares. He pops up whenever Brady's adventures lead him into the sewers and due to Virgil helping overcome his fears, and being the only monster that doesn't want to eat him, they became close friends.
- Gargoyle is a monster that was attracted to Ravenville by the lead pipes. Gargoyle began tearing the lead off them and using it to cover himself during the day due to being highly photosensitive. This caused a wide array of plumbing problems in Ravenville. After experiencing a wild bucking bronco ride on the back of the Gargoyle Brady tricked it into covering itself with tin foil instead of lead, causing the skin to be highly irritated. The Gargoyle left to find better lead which unfortunately became the dam upriver of Ravenville which flooded Ravenville one final time.
- Nightmares are a type of monster that lives under the beds of Ravenville citizens causing nightmares during the night. They gave people terrifying nightmares and came out at night to eat the wood that makes up the foundation of most of Ravenville before Brady Ember and Virgil sucked them up and gave them back to the construction company that planted them in Ravenville.
- Hemlock is a bat-like monster that was passing through Ravenville on its migration to the arctic to sleep for spring. It decided to make a snack of Ravenville citizens for the long migration by using its loud scream to literally scare Ravenville stiff. Brady lured the Hemlock to the ice rink where it went to sleep. It was then shipped to the arctic along with the ice from the rink and Ravenville citizens were thawed in the now swimming pool that was the ice rink.
- Wraith is an evil shadow demon that came to Ravenville to steal its citizens shadows. It transformed Ravenville's citizens into its zombified slaves in the process. It has a weakness to light and became Vlad's shadow to avoid the upcoming sunlight returning Ravenville its shadows in the process.
- Loch Ness monster came to Ravenville from Loch Ness for an unknown reason. It is made of pure water which is the reason no one has ever captured her. After luring it to the swamp it was trapped in everything in Ravenville that is meant to contain water; then Brady made it become Ravenville's best firefighter.
- Springgan is a monster that hates humans because he believes they hate monsters. He came to Ravenville giving every citizen a medallion that turned them into monsters. After some persuasion from the actual monsters the Springgan learned that people in Ravenville actually like monsters and agreed to turned everyone back to normal in exchange for staying in town. Prior Springan pranks includes the destruction of a bridge and all the animals from a zoo being released.
- Dragon was a monster that was released when a bolt of lightning released it from its captivity resulting in it going on a rampage thinking everyone wanted to steal its treasure the very same treasure Brady used to lure it to another tree which he opened up and trapped the Dragon inside. Note this is not the first Dragon to appear as one was used by Ember to chase the Ringmaster after he kidnapped one of her monsters in "How to Collect Monsters".
- Quicksand monsters are a pair of monsters used by Chester Pester to steal all the monsters in Ravenville. They are living blobs of quicksand that work in pairs. Whatever goes in one comes out the other and vice versa. Later all the monsters and Chester were brought to Ravenville to torture Chester.
- Berserker is a chaotic klutz. The Berserkers touch destroys everything and this one touches everything. He came to Ravenville looking for Brady, following the advice of a Stinker buddy and resides at the Ravenville pool since water is the only thing that can not be destroyed by the Berserker.
- Borris is the Plunkets' pet dog that was turned into first a two-headed monster, then a high-flying demon by the twins before being turned back to normal by the twins. He also helped catch the Pooka since dogs are the only thing that can see Pookas with the naked eye.
- Missing link is a monster that came to Ravenville looking for some friends to hang out with. Brady's mother was kidnapped by the link who stayed over by will and even introduced her to some female friends.
- Howler is a monster that sneaked into the basement of Julie from the woods. After a failed attempt to catch the monster she went on a rampage beating up everyone who made noise including Vlad, who if he "wasn't already a goner he would have just died of embarrassment". Using its hatred for noise, Brady decided to drive the monster back into the forest by assigning everyone in town a noisemaker. This was also a failed attempt. Virgil discovers the hard way that despite the Howler's hatred of noise, she loves music. By giving her Virgil's walkman she became calm enough to keep in town "as long as she had a lifetime of batteries for that thing". She became irresistible to every monster in town after that including, for some bizarre reason, Brady's monster.
- Weeper/Jenny is a monster that drinks tears. She attacked everyone she could and became Jenny during the day. She stayed with Ember until Ember found out about what she was doing. Luckily they came to an understanding. By playing a practical joke on Virgil (which inadvertently caused him streak across town) they even agreed that tears of laughter tasted better.
- Wishing Un-well is a monster that bears a strong resemblance to a well. Whenever someone makes a wish it twists it into the exact opposite. For example, Ember and Virgil both wished for a new bike, then later they crashed into one another, landing on the other's bike and both bikes became junk. Once they finally caught up to it Brady he wished that it would stop granting wishes so because it had to grant the opposite it had to grant what people actually wished for luckily a troll carried it off into the woods preventing it from creating further chaos.
- Medusa is a person who was cursed 2,000 years ago so that anyone who met her gaze would be turned to stone including herself. After she met her own gaze in the reflection of Perseus's shield, the Ravenville art museum bought the statue of Medusa and as the curator was setting up her display Medusa met her own frozen gaze in a mirror and was released. After going on a short rampage she was lured into a mirror shop where she met her own gaze again freeing everyone who was turned to stone. Then she met her gaze again and was released trapping Virgil. Then Brady gave her his ultraviolet sunglasses which released Virgil and because, according to Brady, she was a nice person before the curse turned her into a monster, she became a peaceful member of the monster community and became part of Virgil's neighborhood.
- Attractor is a monster robot that is held together by magnets. It lives near the power plant so that it can recharge its magnets every week. Unfortunately Virgil accidentally unplugged a cable that Attractor stepped on, reversing his polarity. So instead of being held together he was blown apart, and since they couldn't reattach to each other they tried to attach themselves to whatever, and whoever they could find, including at several points Virgil. Luckily, thanks to Brady's poor electrician of a dad they were able to put Attractor back together again and he certainly would not be returning to the power plant anytime soon due to his magnets being over charged. He seemed to have been aware of the fact that Virgil caused his malfunction.
- Court Jester ghost a ghost from a haunted horror book he made a nuisance of himself by bringing the contents of any book he could find to life until Brady convinced it to reside in a history book where it could relive as many different stories as possible. It trapped Virgil in its book to make him take his place.
- Stinker is a monster with extremely low self-esteem and high intelligence with a stink so powerful it melts whole cars in seconds. Ember and Virgil put it through bath after bath until Brady arrived from an out of town shopping trip with the answer: the Stinker's stink was internal and emotional. Brady cured this by curing his self-esteem and he came out smelling like roses.
- Pigment is a ghost of clown that was haunting a picture. It requires color to become real and sucked up every drop it could find with chaotic results. When Brady turned the water fountain into a paint fountain the Pigment absorbed all the color, then blew up. The clown's painting was sold to the local art museum where, according to Brady, "there's enough wasted paint in there to last a lifetime" which actually made the paintings look better.
- Wilding is a bizarre plant monster that came to Ravenville to transform it into the botanical forest it once was. Brady manage to trap it in a scale model of Ravenville and cut off all other sources of water in Ravenville giving it exactly what it wanted a forest version of Ravenville.
- Sapphire/Velma is a monster that came to Ravenville to meet her on-line date Vlad. Little did she know he is a Vampire. Where she is a Sapphire—a vampire that is immune to daylight but allergic to moonlight. Due to the confusion she went to the meeting place at the incorrect time and went on a rampage looking for Vlad before rousting in Virgil's closet.
- Pooka is an invisible monster that came to Ravenville to create hatred and chaos that it feeds off of by stealing everything he could get his hands on then framing everyone in sight. Borris could see him and helped Brady catch the Pooka and made him return all the items he stole. He then paired him with the grouchy Minotaur since his bad personality makes him the perfect match for the Pooka.
- Meanie is a reversed version of a genie that was found in the wall of the Plunket house during some destructive renovations, but instead of taking orders, he gives them. Meanie casts a spell on the Plunket house that when Maxwell gives him the key to the house, they will switch places. The Plunkets will move into the lamp and Meanie would go into the house and freeing it. Brady manages to avoid this by tricking Meanie into its lamp and then throwing it out the window, thus breaking the spell.
- Monster Virus is a computer virus that Virgil downloaded onto Brady's computer, who then took over it, the house and pretty much all of Ravenvile using the power cables and phone lines. After that, it proceeded to enslave Ravenville by taking control of every machine it could find thanks to the cooperation of the town's monsters, including the Sparker, it was shorted out.
- Goblin is a monster so scary, it even scares all the other monsters away. Because of this he believes that other monsters hate him so he kept scaring monsters away from Ravenville. Brady lured the monster to the monster shop where it was thrown a monster party and learned that looks are not everything. This is not the first goblin to appear another was seen in the episode "how to use your monster for home protection" beating up a criminal that tried to rob the house he was living in.

== Episodes ==
No.	Title	Directed by	Written by	Original release date	French airdate	Prod. code	French viewers (millions)
1	"How the Monsters Came to Ravenville"	Olivier Bonnet	Laurent Rullier	March 15, 2005	TBA	S01E01	N/A
1	"How to Get Rid of an Undesirable Monster"	Olivier Bonnet	Laurent Rullier	March 15, 2005	TBA	S01E01	N/A
2	"How to Handle a Part-Time Monster"	Olivier Bonnet	Laurent Rullier	March 15, 2005	TBA	S01E02	N/A
2	"How to Soothe Ruffled Feathers, Fur... and Scales"	Olivier Bonnet	Franck Salomé, Ilya Nicolas and Midam	March 15, 2005	TBA	S01E02	N/A
3	"How to Find Your Missing Monster"	Olivier Bonnet	Laurent Rullier	TBA	October 3, 2007	S01E03	TBD
3	"How to Haunt a House"	Olivier Bonnet	Philippe Pierre-Adolphé and Stéphane Chapuy	TBA	October 3, 2007	S01E03	TBD
4	"How to Use Your Monster for Home Protection"	Olivier Bonnet	Midam, Ilya Nicolas and Frederick Maslanka	TBA	TBA	S01E04	TBD
4	"How to Sneak Your Monster on Vacation With You"	Olivier Bonnet	Aline Leblon	TBA	TBA	S01E04	TBD
5	"How to Build Your Own Monster"	Olivier Bonnet	Frederick Maslanka	TBA	TBA	S01E05	TBD
5	"How to Throw a Monster Party"	Olivier Bonnet	Philippe Daniau & Nasser Zeboudj	TBA	TBA	S01E05	TBD
6	"How to Keep a Sea Monster from Eating Your Town"	Olivier Bonnet	Claude Prothee and Frederick Maslanka	TBA	TBA	S01E06	TBD
6	"How to Groom Your Monsters for Success"	Olivier Bonnet	Stéphane Chapuy and Philippe Pierre-Adolphé	TBA	TBA	S01E06	TBD
7	"How to Impress a Girl With Your Mummy"	Olivier Bonnet	Midam, Ilya Nicolas and Franck Salomé	TBA	TBA	S01E07	TBD
7	"How to Bond with a Banshee"	Olivier Bonnet	Stéphane Chapuy and Philippe Pierre-Adolphé	TBA	TBA	S01E07	TBD
8	"How to Turn Your Monster Into a Latin Lover"	Olivier Bonnet	Laurent Rullier and Aline Leblon	TBA	TBA	S01E08	TBD
8	"How to Date a Werewolf"	Olivier Bonnet	Midam, Ilya Nicolas and Jacques Espagne	TBA	TBA	S01E08	TBD
9	"How to Be a Good Monstersitter"	Olivier Bonnet	Stéphane Chapuy and Philippe Pierre-Adolphé	TBA	TBA	S01E09	TBD
9	"How to Make Your Monster Happy"	Olivier Bonnet	Midam, Ilya Nicolas and Aline Leblon	TBA	TBA	S01E09	TBD
10	"How to Grow Your Own Horror"	Olivier Bonnet	Laurent Rullier and Laurent Bounoure	TBA	TBA	S01E10	TBD
10	"How to Celebrate Christmas with Your Own Monster"	Olivier Bonnet	Franck Salomé	TBA	TBA	S01E10	TBD
11	"How to Put Together a Skeleton"	Olivier Bonnet	Aline Leblon	TBA	TBA	S01E11	TBD
11	"How to Give Your Monster Courage"	Olivier Bonnet	Laurent Rullier	TBA	TBA	S01E11	TBD
12	"How to Sabotage a Gargoyle"	Olivier Bonnet	Philippe Daniau and Nasser Zeboudj	TBA	TBA	S01E12	TBD
12	"How to Housebreak the Monster Under Your Bed"	Olivier Bonnet	Franck Salome	TBA	TBA	S01E12	TBD
13	"How to Collect Monsters"	Olivier Bonnet	Philippe Daniau and Nasser Zeboudj	TBA	TBA	S01E13	TBD
13	"How to Stop a Monster Migration"	Olivier Bonnet	Philippe Daniau and Nasser Zeboudj	TBA	TBA	S01E13	TBD
14	"How to Unplug a Sparker"	Olivier Bonnet	Jacques Espagne	TBA	TBA	S01E14	TBD
14	"How to Catch Your Missing Shadow"	Olivier Bonnet	Franck Salomé	TBA	TBA	S01E14	TBD
15	"How to Plug the Loch Ness Leak"	Olivier Bonnet	Aline Leblon	TBA	TBA	S01E15	TBD
15	"How to Steal a Monster's Treasure"	Olivier Bonnet	Lienne Sawatsky and Daniel Williams	TBA	TBA	S01E15	TBD
16	"How to Put Out a Fiery Dragon"	Olivier Bonnet	Julien Gars and Claude Gars	TBA	TBA	S01E16	TBD
16	"How to Dodge the Quicksand"	Olivier Bonnet	Frederick Maslanka	TBA	TBA	S01E16	TBD
17	"How to Break Up a Berserker"	Olivier Bonnet	Thomas Lapierre	TBA	TBA	S01E17	TBD
17	"How to Raise a Hatchling"	Olivier Bonnet	Thomas Lapierre	TBA	TBA	S01E17	TBD
18	"How to Remind Your Monster Who He Is"	Olivier Bonnet	Stephen Ashton	TBA	TBA	S01E18	TBD
18	"How to Turn Your Pet Into a Monster"	Olivier Bonnet	Thomas Lapierre	TBA	TBA	S01E18	TBD
19	"How to Hook Up a Missing Link"	Olivier Bonnet	Lienne Sawatsky and Daniel Williams	TBA	TBA	S01E19	TBD
19	"How to Heal a Howler's Heart"	Olivier Bonnet	Stéphane Chapuy and Philippe Pierre-Adolphé	TBA	TBA	S01E19	TBD
20	"How to Make a Monster Cry"	Olivier Bonnet	Franck Salomé	TBA	TBA	S01E20	TBD
20	"How to Recognize a Wishing Un-well"	Olivier Bonnet	Lienne Sawatsky and Daniel Williams	TBA	TBA	S01E20	TBD
21	"How a Monster Runs for Mayor"	Olivier Bonnet	Julien Gars and Claude Gars	TBA	TBA	S01E21	TBD
21	"How to Make a Medusa Blink"	Olivier Bonnet	Lienne Sawatsky and Daniel Williams	TBA	TBA	S01E21	TBD
22	"How to Distract an Attractor"	Olivier Bonnet	Stephen Ashton	TBA	TBA	S01E22	TBD
22	"How to Read a Ghost Story"	Olivier Bonnet	Lienne Sawatsky and Daniel Williams	TBA	TBA	S01E22	TBD
23	"How to Stop a Stink"	Olivier Bonnet	Stephen Ashton	TBA	TBA	S01E23	TBD
23	"How to Paint a Pigment"	Olivier Bonnet	Franck Salomé	TBA	TBA	S01E23	TBD
24	"How to Catch a Spring Fever"	Olivier Bonnet	Thomas Lapierre	TBA	TBA	S01E24	TBD
24	"How to Save a Sapphire"	Olivier Bonnet	Lienne Sawatsky & Daniel Williams	TBA	TBA	S01E24	TBD
25	"How to Peg a Pooka"	Olivier Bonnet	Philippe Daniau and Nasser Zeboudj	TBA	TBA	S01E25	TBD
25	"How to Mystify a Meanie"	Olivier Bonnet	Thomas Lapierre	TBA	TBA	S01E25	TBD
26	"How to Vex a Virus"	Olivier Bonnet	Franck Salomé	TBA	TBA	S01E26	TBD
26	"How to Goodbye a Goblin"	Olivier Bonnet	Franck Salomé	TBA	TBA	S01E26	TBD
