= Snailsbury Tales =

BBC children's cartoon, 2006–2010

Snailsbury Tales is a British 2002 animated children's television series broadcast on the BBC (on both the CBBC channel and its BBC Two slot) between 2002 and 2005 and moved to Tiny Pop between 2006 and 2010. It was produced by Maverick Entertainment.

The animated series itself was about a fictional town called Snailsbury whose inhabitants were all anthropomorphic snails. Much of the humour derived from the fact that it would take 10 days to visit the shops, or that the fire service was proud of their ability to move at 0.1 mph.

The show's voice cast featured Jon Culshaw as the Narrator, and additional voices, alongside David Holt, Sheila Steafel and Mike Hurley providing the voices of all the female characters and other additional voices such as the children. Backgrounds were drawn by Matt Cooley, an art teacher at Wanstead High School. About twenty-seven ten-minute episodes of Snailsbury Tales were produced over one single season.

== Snailsbury Tales episodes ==
- 1. The Maze
- 2. Aerial Photography
- 3. Drought
- 4. The First Snail in Space
- 5. Tooth Fairy
- 6. Mobile Phones
- 7. Old Age
- 8. Pet Show
- 9. Shell Shock
- 10. Nature Walk
- 11. Musician of the Year
- 12. Genie
- 13. The Mystery of Snailsbury Pond
- 14. Skateboard
- 15. Snail's Pace
- 16. Off to the Circus
- 17. Burglary
- 18. Something in the Water
- 19. Mighty Snail
- 20. Ghost
- 21. Snow
- 22. Town Hall Dance
- 23. Cross Country
- 24. Disco
- 25. Gone with the Wind
- 26. Radio Cabbage
- 27. Monster
