= Uki (TV series) =

Belgian animated television series

- Genre: Children's, Educational
- Created by: Topfloor & Creative Conspiracy
- Opening theme: A new day, a new adventure
- Country of origin: Belgium
- No. of episodes: 52

Production
- Executive producer: Universal Music Belgium
- Running time: 5 minutes

Original release
- Network: Club RTL; Ketnet
- Release: 3 April 2010

Uki is a Belgian animated television series for children. The main character is a small yellow creature who invites his young viewers to discover the world with her.

The show has been airing on Belgian and Finnish networks since April 2010. It was first shown on Club RTL and Ketnet. From September 2011 on, it was also aired on BBC's CBeebies channel, as part of Show Me Show Me.

== Characters ==
Uki, the main character in the series, is a yellow creature with a long neck, wings and an antenna on his head which can perform telekinesis. Neither male nor female (despite being referred to with masculine pronouns), Uki doesn't talk, but expresses himself through sounds, such as laughter and smiles.

Each episode describes a day in Uki’s life and the character experiences a new adventure with his friends Hedgehog, Rabbit, Squirrel, Tortoise, Duck, and the Flowers, under the protective eye of Sun and Cloud.

== Production ==
The production of the show is overseen by the Belgian affiliate of Universal Music Group.

The original designs were created by a Belgian design studio TopFloor (www.topfloor.to). For the actual production of the show Universal Music teamed up with Belgian production studio Creative Conspiracy, the company that was responsible for the 3D character animation in the 2D-animation feature The Triplets of Belleville.

Storylines and scripts were written by Belgian TV and children's authors Dirk Nielandt, Griet Vanhemel, Tom Neuttiens and Diane Redmond.

Music composed by Piet de Ridder. Audio postproduction by Temple Of Tune Belgium. Voices by Jorka Decroubele and Fredo Gevaert.

== Set ==
Uki's world is a children's television program characterized by its portrayal of a safe and contained environment, depicting the experiences of a child as they navigate new sensations and learn about their surroundings. The show features a strong emphasis on music, with simple and catchy melodic jingles aimed at appealing to its target audience of young children.

== Structure ==
Structured in a modular format, each episode of the show is carefully composed to present a series of interconnected segments, including games, puzzles, and activities. These are designed to reinforce the central themes and concepts explored in the storyline, providing children with an interactive and educational viewing experience.

== Awards ==
In 2008 the show won the KidScreen Summit's Pitch it! Award.

== Episodes ==
No.	English	Flemish	Hungarian
01	Where's the Cake	Waar is de taart	Hol a torta
02	The Balloon	De ballon	A lufi
03	The Shadow	Schaduw	Az árnyék
04	The Box	De doos	A doboz
05	Dirty	Vuil!	Piszok
06	Turtle in trouble	Hulp voor schildpad	Teknős bajban
07	Where's the ball	Waar is de bal	Hol a labda
08	Duck is tired	Eend is moe	Fáradt kacsa
09	The Kite	De vlieger	A sárkány
10	The slide	Glijbaan	A csúszda
11	Happy flower	Het blije bloempje	Vidám virágok
12	Rabbit wants to fly	Konijn wil vliegen	Nyuszi repülni szeretne
13	Where's the apple	Waar is de appel	Hol az alma
14	The painting	Het schilderij	A festmény
15	Footprints	Voetsporen	Lábnyom
16	What a mess	Wat een rommel!	Micsoda rendetlenség
17	Hide and Seek	Verstoppertje	Bújócska
18	Atchoo!	Verkouden	Hapcii
19	Building a camp	Een kamp bouwen	Építsünk bunkit
20	The Beehive	De bijenkorf	A kaptár
21	The Bridge	De brug	A híd
22	Rhythm	Ritme	Ritmus
23	See-saw	De wip	A libikóka
24	Peek a Boo	Kiekeboe	Kukucs
25	Blowing Bubbles	Bellen blazen	Buborék fújás
26	Ice Cream	IJsjes	Fagyi
27	How to wake up a sleepy Rabbit	Wakker worden konijn!	Alvó nyuszi
28	Speedy Turtle	Schildpad op wielen	Teknős kerekeken
29	Hiccups	De hik	Csuklás
30	Merry-Go-Round	De draaimolen	Körhinta
31	Snow Rabbit	Sneeuwkonijn	Hónyuszi
32	Super slide	Superglijbaan	Jeges játszótér
33	Tape	Plakkerig	Ragasztószalag
34	Catching nuts	Noten rapen	Uki és Nyuszi makkot gyűjt
35	Sand	De zandbak	Homokozó
36	The Race	Wedstrijd	Verseny
37	Flower is moving	Bloempje verhuist	Virágköltöztetés
38	Rainbow	De regenboog	Szivárvány
39	Hula Hoop	Hoelahoep	Hullahopp
40	Noise	Lawaai	Zaj
41	A hat for Rabbit	Een hoed voor Konijn	Sapka a nyuszinak
42	Where's Hedgehog	Schaduw	Az árnyék
43	The climbing frame	Waar is Egel	Hol van süni
44	Collecting nuts	Noten rapen	Mókus makkot gyűjt
45	Imitating	Wie ben ik	Ki vagyok én
46	Rubbish	Opruimen!	Takarítás
47	The Umbrella	De paraplu	Az esernyő
48	Spinning Top	De tol	Búgócsiga
49	The Butterfly	De vlinder	A pillangó
50	Surprise	Verrassing!	Uki szülinap
51	Slide	De glijbaan	Gumi szánkó
52	Slippery	Glad	Jégcsúszda
