= Çufo =

Albanian television channel

- Country: Albania
- Broadcast area: Albania; Kosovo; North Macedonia; Montenegro
- Headquarters: Tirana, Albania

Programming
- Language: Albanian
- Picture format: 16:9 (576i, SDTV)

Ownership
- Owner: DigitAlb
- Sister channels: Bang Bang; Junior

History
- Launched: December 18, 2006; 19 years ago

Links
- Website: www.digitalb.al

Availability

Streaming media
- DigitAlb OTT: Internet Protocol television

Çufo is an Albanian children's television channel targeting viewers aged 1 to 14 years. It is owned by the media platform DigitAlb and was launched on 18 December 2006, and serves as a sister network to Bang Bang.

The channel's programming is split into three age-based groups based on its rating system: programming aimed at younger children aged 1-5 is labeled as "Baby", programming for children aged 6-9 is labeled as "Kids", and programming aimed at older viewers aged 11-14 is labeled as "Generation". This rating system is also utilized by its sister channel Bang Bang.

All programming on the channel consists of foreign animated series and films that are dubbed into the Albanian language. However, any songs or musical segments within its dubbed programming are often retained from their original language, accompanied by Albanian subtitles that include a translation of the dialogue. Similar to Bang Bang and Junior, the channel offers two audio tracks; the primary in Albanian, and the secondary featuring the program's original language.

The channel's branding contains four letters modelled after a pig which spell the word Çufo. Both the channel's title music used in its on-air idents are based on the 1982 Albanian short Ndodhitë e Çufos (English: Chufo's Events). As with other channels owned by DigitAlb, advertisements are not aired during programming, but are instead shown after them.

== Programming ==
=== Programs ===
Çufo broadcasts foreign animated series and films, all of which are dubbed into Albanian by different recording studios. Since November 2019, the dubbing and recording of all content for both Çufo and its sister channel Bang Bang have been managed by a recording studio named Studio Suprem. Prior to this, several other studios, including "Jess" Discographic/AA Film Company, NGS Recording, Top Channel, Albatrade Studio, and Albania Production, were responsible for translation content for these channels. A significant portion of Çufo's programming has also been broadcast on Bang Bang.

== See also ==
- DigitAlb
- Television in Albania
