= Bang Bang (TV channel) =

Albanian television channel

- Country: Albania
- Broadcast area: Albania; Kosovo; North Macedonia; Montenegro; Across Europe (via satellite); Worldwide (via OTT)
- Headquarters: Tirana, Albania

Programming
- Language: Albanian
- Picture format: 16:9 (576i, SDTV)

Ownership
- Owner: DigitAlb
- Sister channels: Çufo; Junior

History
- Launched: July–August 2004 (terrestrial); 17 December 2004 (20 years ago) (satellite)

Links
- Website: digitalb.al

Bang Bang is an Albanian TV channel for children aged 1–14. It was launched on 17 December 2004 by the TV platform DigitAlb. All of Bang Bang's programming is in Albanian, which can be switchable to the original language (of dubbing) on the second audio track. The channel also has a rating system, which is divided into three groups; Baby (1–5 years old), Kids (6–9 years old), and Generation (11–14 years old).

Çufo is its main sister channel, sharing its dubs and promos about upcoming content with each other. Many dubs that have aired on Çufo in the past currently air on Bang Bang or vice versa.

== Programming ==
=== Programs ===
Bang Bang broadcasts various foreign animated series from around the world, all dubbed into Albanian, along with some Albanian originals mostly made by DigitAlb. The dubbing is currently handled by Studio Suprem, with previous contributions from various studios such as AA Film Company's "Jess" Discographic, NGS Recording, Top Channel, Albatrade, and Albania Production (Unison).

== Logo history ==
The first logo used by Bang Bang from 2004 to 2006 featured a train with the engine displaying the letter "B" and the carriages spelling out "ANG BANG." The second logo, used from 2006 to 2007, depicted a blue-colored splash with the words "BANG BANG" inside. From 2007 to 2009, the logo consisted of eight differently colored splashes, each containing one letter of the name, such as "B" in the first splash and "A" in the second. Since 2009, the logo has used eight yellow-colored letters, and the channel has introduced its own mascot, a monkey formed from the channel's letters.

== See also ==
- DigitAlb
- Television in Albania
