= Emilia Attías =

Argentine actress, model, singer and TV host

Emilia Attias
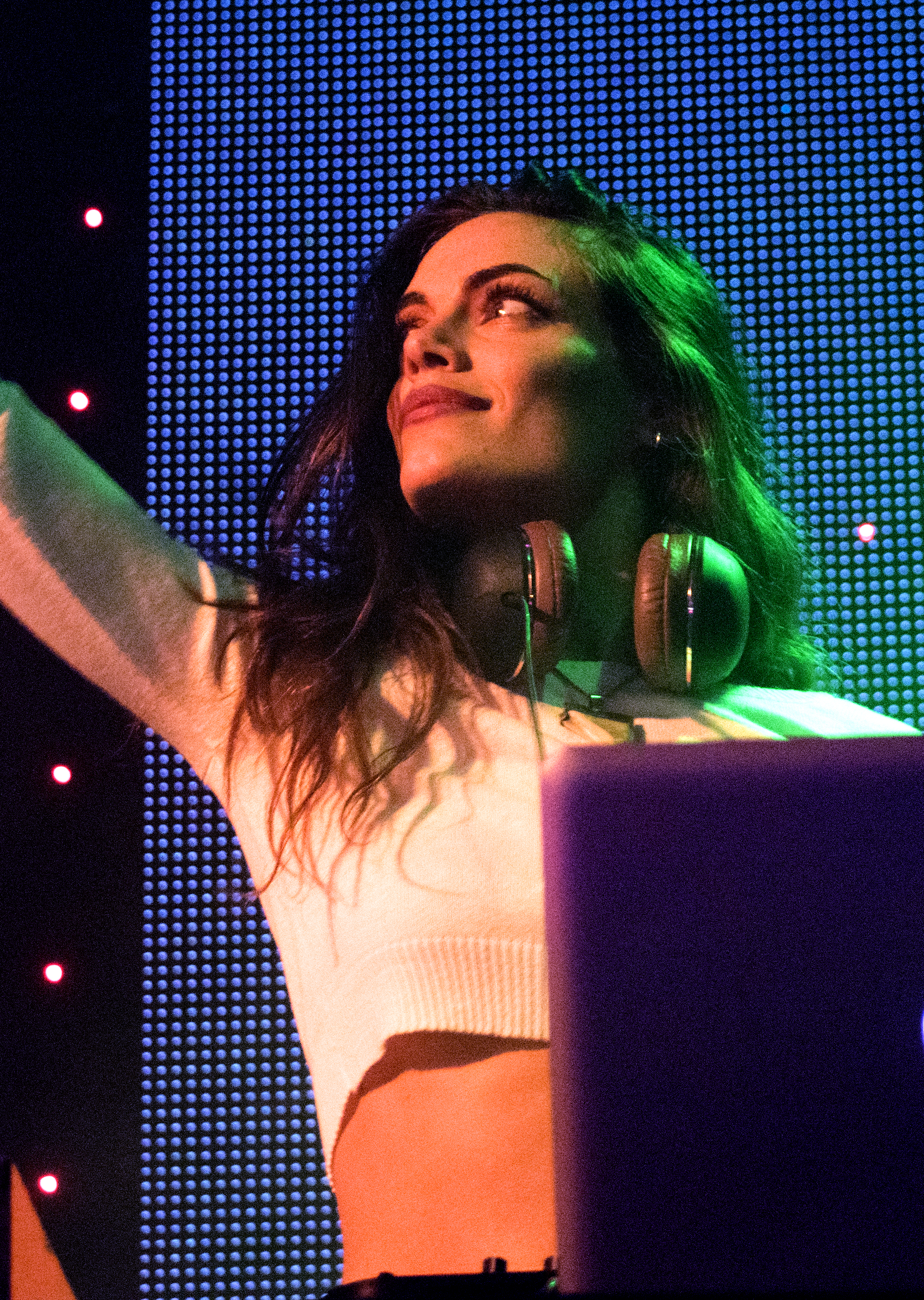
- Attías in 2015
- Born: María Emilia Attias Pompei; March 20, 1987 (age 39); Buenos Aires, Argentina
- Occupation: Actress
- Years active: 1999-present
- Height: 1.73 m (5 ft 8 in)
- Spouse: Naím Sibara (2009-2024)
- Children: 1

María Emilia Attias Pompei (born March 20, 1987), better known as Emilia Attias, is an Argentine actress, model, singer, DJ and television host.

== Biography ==
María Emilia Attías was born in the city of Buenos Aires, Argentina, on March 20, 1987. She is the fourth of five children, who had the marriage of Carlos Attias, a retired Lieutenant Colonel and former rugby coach at the Centro Naval Argentino club and Hebe Ada Rosa Pompei, a real estate businesswoman. Her parents divorced when Emilia was six years old.

== Personal life ==
Since 2006, Attías was in a relationship with the actor and musician Naím Sibara. They married on December 3, 2009, and she gave birth to the couple's first child, a girl, whom they called Gina, on October 28, 2016. In 2024, Attías and Sibara confirmed their separation.

== Career ==
When María Emilia Attias was 12 years old, she was discovered on the street and from that moment she began modeling, starring in various campaigns, which helped her pay for her singing and acting classes with Norman Briski. During her teens she was a model in countless graphic campaigns and advertising, in Argentina and abroad. At age 15 she traveled to London to enter the European publishing market. María Emilia Attias began her career in television in 2003, in the youth television series Rebelde Way. In 2004, she was part of the cast of the television series Los Roldán. From 2004 to 2005, she makes a small participation in the television series No hay 2 sin 3. In 2005, she was the host of a program, called Ayer te vi. In 2005, she made her film debut, with a film of Nicolás Capelli, with the film Matar a Videla stars alongside Diego Mesaglio and María Fiorentino. In 2006, she was convened by Reina Reech and Miguel Ángel Cherutti to participate in Inolvidable, theatrical music hall. In 2006, she was part of the cast of the television series Gladiadores de Pompeya. In 2006, she was convened to participate in the contest of Bailando por un Sueño 2006. At the end of the year 2006, with 19 years old, Emilia Attias signed contract with Cris Morena to be one of the protagonist of the youth television series Casi Ángeles with Nicolás Vázquez, Alejo García Pintos, Jimena Barón, Gastón Dalmau, Nicolás Riera, Juan Pedro Lanzani, Mariana Espósito, María Eugenia Suárez, Rocío Igarzábal, Pablo Martínez, Agustín Sierra, Candela Vetrano, María Del Cerro, Stéfano de Gregorio, Gimena Accardi, Julia Calvo, Mariano Torre, Victorio D´Alessandro, Daniela Aita, Mercedes Funes, Lucas Ferraro and Peto Menahem. In 2010, she was the host of a youth program, called Re-creo en vos. In 2010, she was convened again to participate in the contest of Bailando 2010. In 2010, she and her husband Naím Sibara creates, the production company Siamese Productions, which merged with the Israeli production company AmjaTV, made the pilot for Minou. In October 2011, she acted in the movie Días de vinilo . In 2011, she acted in the movie El secreto de Lucía. In 2012, she was the protagonist of the television series Los únicos with Nicolás Vázquez and Nicolás Cabré. In 2013, she was the host of a program, called Reef Classic Pilsener Light Montañita 2013. In 2013, she makes a small participation in the television seriesLos Vecinos en Guerra. From 2013 to 2014, she was one of the protagonist of the television series Mis amigos de siempre. In 2014, she acted in the movie Contrasangre. In 2015, she starred in the play OrguYo, starred alongside Leticia Brédice, directed by Cristian Morales and written by Leticia Brédice. In 2015, she acted in the movie El muerto cuenta su historia. In 2015, she acted in the movie Ojalá vivas tiempos interesantes. In 2016 Emilia Attias returns to cinema with the protagonist in the movie Dolores. In 2016, she makes a small participation in the play El otro lado de la cama. In 2018, she was the protagonist in the movie La sequía. In 2019, she was the host of a program, called Resto del mundo.

== Filmography ==
=== Television ===
Year	Title	Character	Channel
2003	Rebelde Way	Celeste	Canal 9
2004	Los Roldán	Magda	Canal 9
2004-2005	No hay 2 sin 3	Bárbara	Canal 9
2006	Gladiadores de Pompeya	Lucero	Canal 9
2007-2010	Casi Ángeles	Ángeles Inchausti/Paz Bauer	Telefe
2012	Los únicos	Mía Horgensen	Canal 13
2013	Los Vecinos en Guerra	Guadalupe	Telefe
2013	Historias de diván	Natalia	Telefe
2013-2014	Mis amigos de siempre	Bárbara Delgado	Canal 13
2014	Viento Sur	Sofía Ludueña/Cersei Karnstein	América TV
2015	Cromo	Valentina	TV Pública/Netflix

=== Television programs ===
Year	Program	Channel	Notes
2005	Call TV	Canal 9	Host
2005	Ayer te vi	Canal 9	Co-Host
2006	Bailando por un Sueño 2006	Canal 13	Competitor
2010	Re-creo en vos	Canal 13	Host
2010	Bailando 2010	Canal 13	Competitor
2013	Reef Classic Pilsen Light Montañita 2013	TC Televisión	Host
2019	Fund TV Awards	Volver	Host
2019	Resto del mundo	Canal 13	Host

=== Movies ===
Year	Movie	Character	Director
2005	Matar a Videla	Lucía	Nicolás Capelli
2011	Días de vinilo	Lila	Gabriel Nesci
2011	El secreto de Lucía	Lucía	Becky Garello
2014	Contrasangre	Analía	Nacho Garassino
2015	El muerto cuenta su historia	Bea	Fabián Forte
2015	Ojalá vivas tiempos interesantes	Laia	Santiago Van Dam
2016	Dolores	Dolores	Juan Dickinson
2018	La sequía	Fran	Martín Jáuregui

=== Theater ===
Year	Title	Character	Director	Theater
2006	Inolvidable: Una historia de humor	Emilia	Reina Reech and Miguel Ángel Cherutti	Teatro Premier
2007-2009	Casi Ángeles	Cielo Mágico/Paz Bauer	Cris Morena	Teatro Gran Rex
2015	OrguYo	Lana	Cristian Morales	G104
2016	El otro lado de la cama	Paula	Manuel González Gil	Teatro Apolo

=== Videoclips ===
Year	Artist	Song
2003	Emmanuel Horvilleur	Soy tu nena
2006	Ricardo Arjona	Pingüinos en la cama
2010	Re-creo en vos	Re.creo
2010	Minou	Renacimiento
2010	Gin Tonic	La Argentina esta barata
2014	La Armada Cósmica	Botón

== Awards and nominations ==
Year	Award	Category	Work	Result
2006	Estrella de Mar Awards	Revelation	Inolvidable: Una historia de humor	Nominated
2008	Martín Fierro Awards	Best Leading Actress in Comedy	Casi Ángeles	Nominated
2011	Silver Condor Awards	Female Revelation	Matar a Videla	Nominated
2014	Kids Choice Awards Argentina	Favorite Actress	Mis amigos de siempre	Nominated
2016	Nuevas Miradas Awards	Best Actress	Cromo	Nominated
2017	12 Months Film Festival	Best Actress	El Secreto de Lucía	Nominated
2017	Five Continents International Film Festival	Special Mention for Best Actress	El Secreto de Lucía	Winner
2017	South Film and Arts Academy Festival	Best Actress	El Secreto de Lucía	Winner
2017	Vancouver Alternative Cinema Festival	Best Actress	El Secreto de Lucía	Winner
2018	San Antonio Independent Film Festival	Best Actress	El Secreto de Lucía	Winner
2018	International Author Film Festival	Best International Actress	El Secreto de Lucía	Winner

== Discography ==
=== Studio albums ===
Title	Details
Teen Angels 1	published: April 17, 2007; label: Sony Music Argentina; Format: CD
Teen Angels 2	published: April 15, 2008; label: Sony Music Argentina; Format: CD
Teen Angels 3	published: April 7, 2009; label: Sony Music Argentina; Format: CD

=== Live albums ===
Year	Information
2008	Casi Ángeles en el Gran Rex
2009	Casi Ángeles En Vivo Teatro Gran Rex 2009

=== Simple ===
Year	Title	Album
2007	"Casi Ángeles"	Teen Angels 1
2007	"Voy Por Más"	Teen Angels 1
2007	"No te rindas"	Teen Angels 1
2007	"Dos Ojos"	Teen Angels 1
2007	"Valiente"	Teen Angels 1
2007	"Para vos"	Teen Angels 1
2007	"Te amaré por siempre"	Teen Angels 1
2007	"Un ángel"	Teen Angels 1
2007	"Tan alegre el corazón"	Teen Angels 1
2008	"Señas tuyas"	Teen Angels 2
2008	"Río de besos"	Teen Angels 2
2008	"Guarda tu fé"	Teen Angels 2
2009	"Cuando llegue tu amor"	Teen Angels 3
2011	"Dicen que yo"	El secreto de Lucía
2011	"Desde que no estas conmigo"	Días de Vinilo

=== Video clips ===
Year	Artist	Video
2014	La Armada Cósmica	"Botón"
2010	Gin Tonic	La Argentina esta barata
2010	Minou	Renacimiento (en Israel) 3D
2010	Re.creo en vos	Re.creo
2008	Casi Ángeles	Señas tuyas
2007	Casi Ángeles	Dos ojos
2007	Casi Ángeles	Casi Ángeles
2007	Casi Ángeles	Voy por más
2006	Ricardo Arjona	Pingüinos en la cama
2003	Emmanuel Horvilleur	Soy tu nena

=== Soundtracks ===
Year	Title	Series/Movie
2007	Voy por más	Series
2007	Dos ojos	Series
2010	Re.Creo en vos	Program
2011	Dicen que yo	Movie
2011	Desde que no estas conmigo	Movie
