= Casi ángeles =

Argentine telenovela

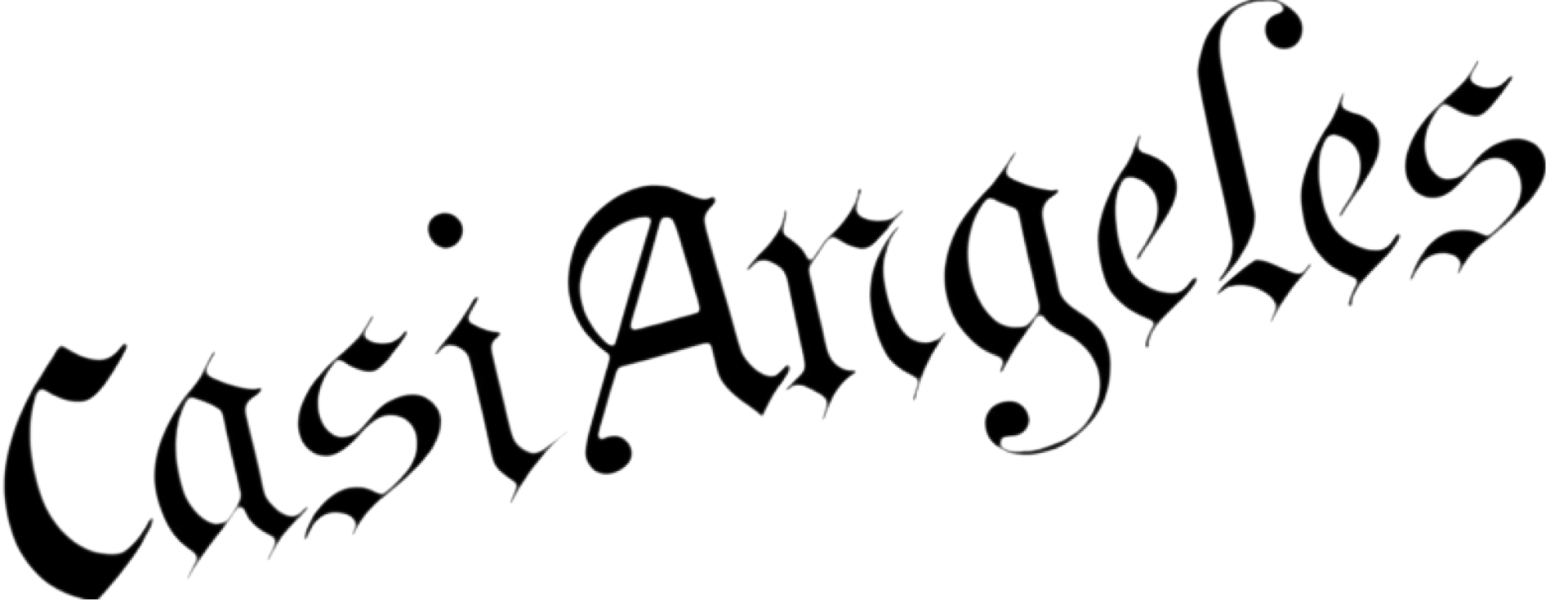
- Genre: Telenovela
- Created by: Cris Morena
- Written by: Leandro Calderone; Gabriela Fiore
- Directed by: Mariano Demaría; Mauro Scandolari; Flavio Rondelli
- Starring: Nicolás Vázquez; Emilia Attias; Juan Pedro Lanzani; Mariana Espósito; María Eugenia Suárez; Gastón Dalmau; Nicolás Riera; Stéfano de Gregorio; Agustín Sierra; Candela Vetrano; María Del Cerro; Rocío Igarzábal; Pablo Martínez; Alejo García Pintos; Jimena Barón; Gimena Accardi; Victorio D'Alessandro; Daniela Aita; Daniela Collini; María Guadalupe Antón; Tomás Ross; Florencia Cagnasso; Nazareno Antón; Mariano Torre; Julia Calvo
- Opening theme: «Voy por más» (Season 1) «A ver si pueden» (Season 2) «Que nos volvamos a ver» (Season 3) «Vos ya sabés» (Season 4)
- Country of origin: Argentina
- Original language: Spanish
- No. of seasons: 4
- No. of episodes: 580 (list of episodes)

Production
- Producer: Cris Morena
- Running time: 45–60 minutes
- Production companies: Cris Morena Group; RGB Entertainment; Telefe

Original release
- Network: Telefe
- Release: 21 March 2007 – 29 November 2010

Related
- Alma Pirata; Supertorpe; Chiquititas; Verano del '98; Rebelde Way; Rincón de Luz; Floricienta

Casi Ángeles (English: Almost Angels) is an Argentine teen telenovela by Cris Morena which was aired by Telefe. Its first broadcast was on 21 March 2007 and it ended on 29 November 2010, with a total of 579 episodes divided over four seasons. A star-studded soap-opera, Casi Ángeles stars Nicolás Vázquez, Emilia Attias, Mariano Torre and Teen Angels (Juan Pedro Lanzani, Mariana Espósito, Gastón Dalmau, Nicolás Riera, María Eugenia Suárez). Casi Ángeles is considered one of the most successful telenovelas in Argentinian television history. Also due to the success of the show, the pop band Teen Angels emerged, composed of Juan Pedro Lanzani, Mariana Espósito, Gastón Dalmau, Nicolás Riera, María Eugenia Suárez.

== Production ==
The series was mainly filmed in Pampa Studios, located in Buenos Aires, although also some takes were shot in the street. During the end of 2008 the cast and production went on to film the first 5 episodes of the third season on location, to be more specific, in different points in the provinces of Mendoza and San Juan. Also, to record the last episodes of the same season, the team went to San Pedro, a town in Buenos Aires. Towards the end of the last season, the actors Peter Lanzani, Pablo Martínez and Rocío Igarzábal, recorded in the ruins of Villa Epecuén.

== Plot ==
Casi Ángeles is the story of a group of homeless and/ or orphaned children and teenagers who are exploited and forced to steal for Bartolomé Bedoya Agüero (Alejo García Pintos) and Justina Merarda García (Julia Calvo). However, everything changes when Cielo Mágico (Emilia Attias), acrobat and dancer, and Dr. Nicolás Bauer (Nicolás Vázquez), an archaeologist, enter the kids' lives. Cielo, through her music, her love and her kindness, and Nicolás, with his fatherly nature and dreams, give the children the chance to believe in joy again. They both keep important secrets that, when discovered, will change everyone's lives forever. This is a story packed with magic, love, music, songs, dances and competitions. Nonetheless, there is a mystery within the house and their relations, and it involves every single one of them. Their individual and group stories have to do with the secrets protected by the hidden portal in the clock inside the Inchaustis' mansion and the special connection that everyone has with it and each other. As a magic object, this portal has chosen each and every one of the Casi Ángeles with the utmost care, and everyone thus has a mission. Discovering this mission will be the meaning of this action-packed adventure.

== Seasons ==
=== Season 1; Island Eudamón (2007) ===
The story begins when Cielo Mágico (Emilia Attías) a circus acrobat, and Nicolás Bauer (Nicolás Vázquez), an archaeologist obsessed with finding the Island of Eudamón, arrive in the lives of a group of orphaned children exploited by the evil Bartolomé Bedoya Agüero (Alejo García Pintos) and his housekeeper Justina (Julia Calvo). Cielo and Nico will help and rescue these children, while discovering the dark secrets hidden in the Inchausti Mansion, linked to Cielo's past and Eudamón. In that mansion, Bartolomé serves as director of the BB Foundation, which he uses as a front for his fearsome plans, which are threatened by the appearance of the heirs, Ángeles and Luz Inchausti (Florencia Cagnasso).

=== Season 2; The Man of the Thousand Faces (2008) ===
In the second season, the kids, not being subdued by Bartolomé Bedoya Agüero any longer, start having a normal life, in the renamed : Magical Home, now directed by Nico (Nicolás Vázquez) and Cielo/Ángeles (Emilia Attias); who at first is missing after being absorbed by the magic portal (clock) inside the mansion. However, new kids come to the house/ foundation, and the Corporación Cruz [CC] appears, led by Juan Cruz (Mariano Torre), the main villain of this season and Thiago's biological father. JC is a fallen angel, a shadow, obsessed with returning to Eudamón, and with Cielo, who managed, just like him, to reach that "other level". Juan Cruz will try to emotionally break everyone who lives in the mansion, and in order to achieve his goal, will try in many ways to prevent Cielo from having her and Nico's daughter: Paz.

=== Season 3; The Little Prince (2009) ===
The third season incorporates themes such as lateral thinking and ecology, which were added to and reinforced ideas implemented in previous seasons such as freedom of expression and social awareness. This season, the kids and Justina reappear in different places, 22 years in the future, after opening the book of the 7 padlocks on the fountain in front of the Mansion. From there, with the help of their "acquired nieces": Paz (Emilia Attias) and Hope (Jimena Barón), Nico's daughters, and the help of Camilo Estrella (Mariano Torre); they will discover their mission, that turns out to be "Save Paz" (which also means : "Save the peace [in the world]") to return home. Paz is a restless, disobedient girl, with a maternal, liberal and protective spirit, who falls in love with Camilo Estrella, the new director of the Mandalay Institute. In this season, Juan Cruz, unable to prevent the birth of Paz, will try to kill her 22 years later, in order to return to Eudamón. To all this are also added the confrontation against the dictatorial government under the command of the Chief of Ministers (Mercedes Funes), and each of the characters personal problemas and developments.

=== Season 4; The Resistance (2010) ===
Casi Ángeles: "La Resistencia", is the consequence of having saved Paz (Emilia Attias). Having fulfilled that mission meant succumbing to a great temporal paradox, where the Head of Ministers (Mercedes Funes), who turned out to be Luz Inchausti, launched "The Little Prince" protocol. From there, the kids were unable to return to their time and they scattered. Several were captured by the Government Corporation, reset and taken to what was once the Mandalay, now transformed completely by Luz and called NE Institute (NE, is the acronym for New Era). The others the other guys are part of "The Resistance" and from there, they will do everything possible to fulfill their new mission and return home.

== Cast ==
=== Season 1 ===
==== Protagonists ====
- Nicolás Vázquez as Nicolás Andrés Bauer
- Emilia Attias as Ángeles Inchausti / Cielo Mágico

==== Main cast ====
- Juan Pedro Lanzani as Thiago Adolfo Bedoya Agüero
- Mariana Espósito as Marianella Talarico Rinaldi
- María Eugenia Suárez as Jazmín Romero Guzmán
- Gastón Dalmau as Ramiro Ordóñez
- Nicolás Riera as Juan "Tacho" Morales
- Stéfano de Gregorio as León "Lleca" Benítez
- Agustín Sierra as Ignacio "Nachito" Pérez Alzamendi
- Candela Vetrano as Estefanía "Tefi" Elordi Rinaldi
- Alejo García Pintos as Bartolomé Bedoya Agüero
- Gimena Accardi as Malvina Bedoya Agüero
- Julia Calvo as Justina Merarda García
- Guadalupe Antón as Alelí Ordóñez
- Tomás Ross as Cristóbal Bauer / Cristóbal Ibarlucía
- Florencia Cagnasso as Luz Inchausti
- Nazareno Antón as Mateo "Monito" Bauer Inchausti
- Gerardo Chendo as Mogli
- Lucas Ferraro as Marcos Ibarlucía / James Jonses

==== Antagonists ====
- Alejo García Pintos as Bartolomé Bedoya Agüero
- Julia Calvo as Justina Merarda García

==== Participations ====
- Sergio Bermejo as Adolfo Pérez Alzamendi
- Luz Cipriota as Brenda Azúcar
- Luis Campos as Pedro Rinaldi
- Silvina Bosco as Rosalía Ordóñez
- Luis Gianneo as Ernesto Vico
- Ezequiel Castaño as Alberto "Albertito" Paulazzo
- Vilma Ferrán as Rosarito Guevara de Dios
- Dani La Chepi as María
- Jenny Williams as Bárbara
- Benjamín Rojas as Himself
- Marcos Woinski as Aldo Esteban Inchausti
- Juan Carlos Galván as Jasper Hantus
- Graciela Pal as Berta Bauer
- Lucrecia Blanco as Carla Kosovsky
- Gustavo Bonfigli as Ramón Bueno
- Débora Warren as Sandra Rinaldi / Julia Elordi
- Fabián Talín as Sergio Elordi
- Celina Font as Ornella Blaquier
- Tony Lestingi as Ismael Azúcar
- Adrián Spinelli as Mauro Loyza
- Coni Marino as Mercedes Benítez
- Alejandro Gancé as Marcelo Benítez
- Graciela Stéfani as María Laura "Malala" Torres Oviedo Vda. de Santillán
- Angela Ragno as Older Esperanza Bauer
- Laura Anders as Dolores
- Federico Amador as Álex
- Giselle Bonafino as Lola
- Dolores Ocampo as Federica
- Sofía Elliot as Marilyn
- Camila Riveros as Josefina "Ardilla" Lucero
- Gabo Correa as Malatesta
- Marcelo Mazzarello as "El Payaso Llorón"
- Solange Verina

=== Season 2 ===
==== Protagonists ====
- Nicolás Vázquez as Nicolás Andrés Bauer
- Emilia Attias as Ángeles Inchausti / Cielo Mágico / Linda Barba

==== Main cast ====
- Juan Pedro Lanzani as Thiago Adolfo Bedoya Agüero
- Mariana Espósito as Marianella Talarico Rinaldi
- María Eugenia Suárez as Jazmín Romero Guzmán
- Gastón Dalmau as Ramiro Ordóñez
- Nicolás Riera as Juan "Tacho" Morales
- Stéfano de Gregorio as León "Lleca" Benítez
- Agustín Sierra as Ignacio "Nachito" Pérez Alzamendi
- Candela Vetrano as Estefanía "Tefi" Elordi Rinaldi
- Pablo Martínez as Simón Bruno Arrechavaleta Rodríguez
- Rocío Igarzábal as Valeria Gutiérrez
- María Del Cerro as Melody Paz
- Gimena Accardi as Malvina Bedoya Agüero
- Julia Calvo as Justina Merarda García / Felicitas García
- Victorio D´Alessandro as Luca Franccini
- Daniela Aita as Caridad Martina Cuesta
- Guadalupe Antón as Alelí Ordóñez
- Tomás Ross as Cristóbal Bauer / Cristóbal Ibarlucía
- Florencia Cagnasso as Luz Inchausti
- Nazareno Antón as Mateo "Monito" Bauer Inchausti

==== Antagonists ====
- Julia Calvo as Justina Merarda García
- Mariano Torre as Juan Cruz York
- Manuela Pal as Franka Mayerhold
- David Masajnik as Charly

==== Participations ====
- Alejo García Pintos as Bartolomé Bedoya Agüero
- Nicolás Pauls as Salvador Quiroga Harms / Juan Cruz York
- Vilma Ferrán as Rosarito Guevara de Dios
- Marta González as Hilda Fernández
- Claudia Lapacó as Dora Aguirre
- Calu Rivero as Juliette
- David Chocarro as Matt
- Victoria Maurette as Lic. Fahrenheit
- Pato Menahem as Bruno "Tic-Tac" Bedoya Agüero Talarico Rinaldi
- Sofía Palagreco as Baby Esperanza "Hope" Bauer
- Ángela Ragno as Older Esperanza Bauer
- Alan Soria as Jerónimo Vanstrante
- Lucrecia Blanco as Carla Kosovsky
- Graciela Pal as Berta Suliga
- Débora Warren as Sandra Rinaldi
- César Bordón as Mauro "Terremoto" Talarico
- Celina Font as Ornella Blaquier
- Bárbara Napal González as Lucía Pérez Alzamendi
- Aldo Pastur as Francisco Arrechavaleta
- Paloma Gordo as Soledad Arrechavaleta Rodríguez
- Mariano Torre as Serafín
- Nicolás Garnier as Hernán
- Eliseo Barrionuevo as César
- Paola Sallustro as Luisa "Lulú"
- Vanesa Leiro as Cheta
- ¿? as Octavio Arrechavaleta Rodríguez
- ¿? as Valentín Arrechavaleta Rodríguez

=== Season 3 ===
==== Protagonists ====
- Emilia Attias as Paz Bauer
- Mariano Torre as Camilo Estrella
- Thiago Bedoya Agüero
- Lali Esposito as Mar Talarico Rinaldi
- Gastón Dalmau as Rama Ordoñez
- Eugenia Suárez as Jazmin Romero
- Nicoläs Riera as Tacho Morales
- Agustín Sierra as Ignacio Pérez Alzamendi
- Candela vetrano as Estefanía Elordi Rinaldi
- Maria del cerro as Melody Paz
- Pablo Martinez as Simón Arrechavalet
- Rocío Carbajal as Valeria Gutiérrez.

==== Main cast ====
- Juan Pedro Lanzani as Thiago Adolfo Bedoya Agüero
- Mariana Espósito as Marianella Talarico Rinaldi
- María Eugenia Suárez as Jazmín Romero Guzmán
- Gastón Dalmau as Ramiro Ordóñez
- Nicolás Riera as Juan "Tacho" Morales
- Stéfano de Gregorio as León "Lleca" Benítez
- Agustín Sierra as Ignacio "Nachito" Pérez Alzamendi / Brian Ignacio "Nerdito" Pérez Alzamendi Elordi
- Candela Vetrano as Estefanía "Tefi" Elordi Rinaldi
- Pablo Martínez as Simón Bruno Arrechavaleta Rodríguez
- Rocío Igarzábal as Valeria Gutiérrez
- María Del Cerro as Melody Paz
- Paula Reca as Luna Vörg
- Jimena Barón as Esperanza "Hope" Bauer
- Daniela Aita as Caridad Martina Cuesta / Juan Cruz York
- Daniela Collini as Francisca "Kika" Zanata
- Jaime Domínguez as Jaime Molina
- Máximo Reca as Pedro Vörg
- Benjamín Amadeo as Teo Gorki
- Julia Calvo as Justina Merarda García
- Lucas Crespi as Víctor Vörg
- Maximiliano Ghione as Rafael Alsina

==== Antagonists ====
- Mariano Torre as Juan Cruz York

==== Participations ====
- Emilia Attias as Ángeles Inchausti / Cielo Mágico
- Ricardo Montaner as Bruno "Tic-Tac" Bedoya Agüero Talarico Rinaldi
- Romina Yan as Ariel
- Benjamín Rojas as Cacho de Buenos Aires
- Axel as Bruno "Tic-Tac" Bedoya Agüero Talarico Rinaldi
- Mercedes Funes as Luz Inchausti
- Pato Menahem as Bruno "Tic-Tac" Bedoya Agüero Talarico Rinaldi
- Ángela Ragno as Older Esperanza Bauer
- Sebastián Cura as Sebastián "Torito" Cura
- Leandro Coccaro as Evaristo Gorki
- Agustina Córdova as Sol Aguirre
- Eugenia Luz Mariani as Martina Pérez Alzamendi Cuesta
- Axel Kuschevatzky as Himself / Bruno "Tic-Tac" Bedoya Agüero Talarico Rinaldi
- Grego Rossello as Jerry
- Gastón Vietto como Máximo "Max"
- Rafael Ferro as Ariel's boyfriend

=== Season 4 ===
==== Protagonists ====
- Juan Pedro Lanzani as Thiago Adolfo Bedoya Agüero, he is part of La Resistencia where he takes the role of leader and leads his group to find the rest of the boys, who believe they are kidnapped.
- Mariana Espósito as Marianella "Mar" Talarico Rinaldi, now her name is Marianella Molina Prado Rojo, she lives in the NE because her supposed "parents" were killed by a "savage": Thiago. Immersed in a new reality unfounded by the corporation, Mar is the millionaire and It Girl of the NE.
- María Eugenia Suárez as Jazmín Romero, entered the NE her new story is that she was the daughter of savages, but she was saved by the Civil Guard and integrated into society. She is a fashion designer and comes from Milan.
- Gastón Dalmau as Ramiro Ordóñez, he was one captured by the bombs in Bahia del Príncipe, and is reset: his new identity is that of a studied professional who arrives in the NE as a teacher, is a pirate and throws waves at all the girls.
- Nicolás Riera as Juan "Tacho" Morales, the last of the boys to join the Resistance, where his anger at the government over Jazmin's "death" makes him reluctant to Thiago's peaceful operatives.

==== Main cast ====
- Stéfano de Gregorio as León "Lleca" Benítez, he is one of the boys who has suffered the reset, now he is no longer Lleca, he is known by his baptismal name León Benítez, a stubborn, who does nothing but "collect" girls.
- Agustín Sierra as Ignacio "Nacho" Pérez Alzamendi, he lives in the NE and he will also be reset, implanting memories of being a lower class person, inventing that his parents were pawns of Mar's, and obedient with respect to what Luz orders him.
- Candela Vetrano as Estefanía "Tefi" Elordi Rinaldi, is part of La Resistencia, with the boys who were not reset. She proclaims herself the vice-leader, and spends her time giving orders.
- Pablo Martínez as Simón Bruno Arrechavaleta Rodríguez, it begins on the side of La Resistencia. He ends up marrying Valeria but on his wedding night he would be captured and reset in the NE, where he is introduced as the hero of Mar.
- Rocío Igarzábal as Valeria Gutiérrez, part of The Resistance, who after marrying Simon and he was captured, she does her best to find him but is captured, reset and enters the NE as Valeria Gutierrez Blum, a refined Frenchwoman.
- María Del Cerro as Melody Paz, She manages to escape and resist alone by hiding from the government. He manages to reunite with some of the boys, and together they form: The Resistance. Melody reveals that she is pregnant, and that the baby is Teo's.
- Jimena Barón as Esperanza "Hope" Bauer, she was captured by the Government Corporation, and now lives in the NE. She was reset but then woke up. Since then he pretends to everyone not to remember anything, and that's how he manages to help the boys "wake up".
- Victorio D´Alessandro as Luca Franccini, He is part of the resistance along with the boys and his girlfriend Tefi; he is also reunited with Terra, a girl who is obsessed with him since Open Sky.
- Daniela Collini as Francisca "Kika" Zanata, after the explosion he survived a while without the boys, there he met Nina who led her until Thiago and would reach the Resistance.
- Valentina Zenere as Alai Inchausti, the hysterical and capricious daughter of the chief minister who eventually falls in love with Leon.
- Lucrecia Oviedo as René Teng, is the assistant to the Chief Minister. He has no charisma, is clumsy, and represents a constant headache for the Boss, since she thinks he is incompetent.
- Belén Chavanne as Gianina "Nina" Inchausti, A mute "savage" who lives outside the wall of the city. Little by little, he gains the trust of the boys of La Resistencia until he settles with them but they discover his "great secret".
- Mercedes Funes as Luz Inchausti, the chief minister who completely takes over what was the Mandalay and is responsible for maintaining that "happy" world now the NE, making everyone believe that there is nothing to worry about.
- Benjamín Amadeo as Teo Gorki, he is kidnapped and reset, joining the new world of the Chief Minister, the NE. Teo having new memories becomes a hunter of savages, where he has to hunt mainly the boys of the Resistance.
- Julián Rubino as Jhonny, owner and member of the house where they live forming La Resistencia and there he helps with his knowledge in computer science and computing.

==== Participations ====
- Nicolás Vázquez as Nicolás Andrés Bauer
- Emilia Attias as Ángeles Inchausti / Cielo Mágico / Paz Bauer
- Gimena Accardi as Malvina Bedoya Agüero
- Augusto Schuster as Pablo "Isla Negri" Picasso
- Marisol Romero as Tamara López Ovalles
- Silvina Bosco as Rosalía Ordóñez
- Alejo García Pintos as Bartolomé Bedoya Agüero
- Sergio Bermejo as Adolfo Pérez Alzamendi
- Tommy Dunster as Cristobal Bauer adulto
- Natalia Melcon as Analey
- Julia Calvo as Justina Merarda García / Felicitas García
- Donatella Massa as Young Esperanza "Hope" Bauer
- Pato Menahem as Bruno "Tic-Tac" Bedoya Agüero Talarico Rinaldi
- Ángela Ragno as Older Esperanza Bauer
- Daniela Aita as Caridad Martina Cuesta
- Guadalupe Antón as Alelí Ordóñez
- Tomás Ross as Cristóbal Bauer / Cristóbal Ibarlucía
- Florencia Cagnasso as Luz Inchausti
- Nazareno Antón as Mateo "Monito" Bauer Inchausti
- Jorge Suárez as Older Thiago Adolfo Bedoya Agüero
- Tobías Bernárdez as Bruno Bedoya Agüero Talarico Rinaldi
- Jaime Domínguez as Jaime Molina
- Sebastián Cura as Sebastián "Torito" Cura
- Valentina Ruiz as Paloma Hernández
- Manuela Pal as Franka Mayerhold
- Agustina Prinsich as Valentina Vegga / Agustina Donofrio
- Perla Brostein as Perla "Tierra Prometida" Schneider
- Cristián Belgrano as Gonzalo
- Marina Quesada as Ingrid
- María Zamarbide as Uma
- Lautaro Rodríguez as Hegel
- Belén Persello as Terra
- Luciano Nobile as Joel
- ¿? as Young Paz Bauer
- ¿? as Amado Gorki Paz
- ¿? as Octavio Arrechavaleta Rodríguez
- ¿? as Baby Alai Morales Romero

== Emission and reception ==
At first, «Casi Ángeles» was directed towards a specific audience, particularly to children and adolescents and, in some cases, young adults. In its first season, it averaged 12.0 points along the 166 issues.

In the second season, the program was much more oriented to the adolescent public, increasing the cast of that strip, in addition to the love conflicts between Cielo and Nico. A new format was introduced for a daily fiction: the episodes had titles and ended with a monologue in "off", following the model of the North American series and moments of suspense became important. This season achieved an average of 13.6 rating points in its 160 issues.

In January, Disney Channel began broadcasting the program for Latin America, in an edited version that eliminated all scenes of sex and violence.

The third season, which aired in Argentina in April 2009 and ended on 3 December, with an average of 13.9 rating points, in its 140 issues, was the most viewed season.

The fourth season started in April 2010 and was aired until 29 November of the same year. During the month of June it was out of the air due to the transmission by the channel of the World Cup South Africa 2010. Therefore, it was the shortest season with 113 episodes, achieving a high average of 11.6 points.

| Season | Original release | End of Season | # of episodes | Average rating |
|---|---|---|---|---|
| 1 | 21 March 2007 | 15 November 2007 | 166 | 12.0 |
| 2 | 3 April 2008 | 1 December 2008 | 160 | 13.6 |
| 3 | 20 April 2009 | 3 December 2009 | 140 | 13.9 |
| 4 | 12 April 2010 | 29 November 2010 | 113 | 11.6 |

=== International broadcast ===
The series in addition to being broadcast by Telefe is also broadcast by air and cable channels in different countries of the world, reason why the strip transcended the borders and got a big fanatic around the world, being highlighted Israel. Some of the featured channels are: Jetix South American Zone, as it issued the first two of the strip and Disney Channel north zone, which is in charge of its respective zone of emission.

== Team Angels/Bonus Track ==
The Team Angels or Bonus Track is a block of the program that began to be broadcast 20 June 2008 during the second season of the series in Argentina and that was emitted at the end of each episode. It lasted for about five minutes. In this segment, you could see interviews with the actors and creators, bloopers, behind the scenes, backstage of the Gran Rex Theater performances, rehearsals, real-cam of the actors, questionnaires, fans' videos, among others.

== Logo creation ==
In Season 1, the logo had two angel wings united by a safety pin, which also represented the A for Ángeles. The wings were covered in patches to represent the fact they were poor and had affection holes in their hearts. This explanation was given by Cris Morena during an interview for Produ.tv.

In Season 2, the patches disappeared from the logo. In this season, the characters were not poor anymore and had a loving family.

In Season 3, there was not a safety pin uniting the two wings anymore. The font of Casi Ángeles changed slightly. The logo background image had a mandala, which is one important symbol this season, for example, the school they attend is called Mandalay. For a brief period of the Season 3, the logo went dark to represent the fact Camilo Estrella, Mariano Torre character, had been possessed by the evil Juan Cruz and tragedy would ensue.

In the third-season finale, the fourth season logo was revealed. It is orange and black and it has a different font. There's also a peace sign with two wings coming out of it. The I and V from the title resemble the Roman number for 4, IV.

== Reception ==
Although the show had a good critical reception, Casi Ángeles was received with lukewarm ratings. The fans of Cris Morena criticized the show for being too repetitive, with scenes exactly like some of her previous hits such as Rebelde Way, Floricienta, Chiquititas and Alma Pirata. In the beginning, the show did not have a specific audience, it was targeted to kids and teenagers with some story lines skewing too young while others too old. Also some changes were made in Casi Ángeles. The show concentrated on teenagers and started distancing from previous shows of Cris Morena, adding mystery and suspense elements. The changes had an effect and the audience started to grow.

Although the show was struggling on television, the 2007 musical with the entire cast of the show in Teatro Gran Rex was the highest-grossing live event of the year. As usual, Cris Morena invested millions of dollars in a high-tech concert full of expensive effects and production. It sold over 120,000 tickets. The first-season soundtrack album, with all songs sung by the cast, ranked 12th on the best-selling albums of 2007 list compiled by CAPIF. It also ranked lower than some of the previous Cris Morena production soundtracks (Chiquititas 2006 was sixth on the annual list in 2006, Floricienta 2 was first in 2005, Floricienta 1 was 3rd in 2004 and 10th in 2005, Erreway's Señales was 3rd in 2002 and 7th in 2003) although it did achieve Platinum certification. During the summer hiatus, the cast of the show played concerts in Córdoba, Rosario and Punta del Este.

In the second season, the show got a total makeover. It became much more oriented to teenagers, with the Teen Angels receiving more screen time and Nico and Cielo's relationship less. It also introduced a new format for a daily fiction: episodes had titles and ended in monologues, following the model of U.S. shows such as Grey's Anatomy, Sex and the City and Desperate Housewives. In the same vein as Lost, the mystery elements became very important. The changes were well received and the show's rating exploded. The second soundtrack album was also a strong seller, achieving double platinum and ending the year as the third-best-selling album in the annual ranking.

The Teen Angels popularity skyrocketed with the cast appearing on the cover of several magazines and attracting huge hysteria wherever they went. In Unicenter, a store was opened to sell exclusive Casi Ángeles merchandising, Fans Store. The 2008 live musical in Teatro Gran Rex broke records with 220,000 tickets sold, the second highest attendance ever in the theater's 81 years of history and doubling the number of the previous season After the season of concerts in Buenos Aires, the Teen Angels toured extensively in Argentina, selling out arenas everywhere. They also played a sold-out concert for 40,000 in Montevideo, Uruguay. After the second-season finale, the cast played six additional concerts in Buenos Aires, and, during the summer hiatus, the Teen Angels were chosen as the spokespersons for Coca-Cola. They recorded the song "Hoy Quiero" which became the official Coke Summer Anthem. Also during the summer, they played two sold-out concerts in Mar del Plata and opened the official Coca-Cola stand in Pinamar, attracting over 2500 people to the event.

In January, Disney Channel started airing the show to Latin America, in a highly edited version cutting all the sexual and violent elements. To promote the show and their CD, the Teen Angels traveled to Mexico City for a showcase and interviews. The third season finally debuted in Argentina in April, six months after production began. The third season average is, up to August, 15 points, two points higher than 2008. The third CD is also the best-selling album of the year until the moment. However, the live musical could not top the first two seasons' attendance numbers due to the swine flu epidemic which caused panic in Buenos Aires in July, during the Winter vacations. In August, sales were normalized and the concerts started to sell out fast as usual. However, all the canceled shows in July meant 2009 musical would not top previous years' numbers. In the end, it sold 100,000 tickets, which was less than the two previous seasons.

In late 2008, after the debut of the second season, Casi Ángeles became a gigantic hit in Israel. Peter Lanzani and Lali Espósito visited the country to promote the show and caused hysteria. The complete cast visited Tel Aviv in October 2009 for a series of sold-out concerts which had over 80,000 tickets sold. Peter and Mariana were also chosen as spokespeople for the Keff shampoo.

The third season ended on 5 December 2009. It reached 16.6 points and didn't exceed the season 2 season finale or the season 3 debut (both achieved 18.4 points). Season 3 averaged 14 points, the same as season 2. However, there was a drop in the ratings from the middle of the season.

In November, the Teen Angels did a promotional tour across Latin America. In December, they'll visit Spain and Italy.

The show was renewed for a fourth season and will return to Telefe in 2010. The Teen Angels will star in Coca-Cola Argentina's Christmas promotional campaign and will be featured on Coke's cans.

== Licensing ==
Casi Ángeles spawned a series of merchandising. During the Season 1, the products were targeted to children with toys, apparel, bicycle, cosmetics among others targeting mostly young girls. With the second season became teenage-oriented and the licensing program also started to skew older beginning. Stationery items, posters, postcards, furniture, clothing line, perfumes among other products were released to accompany the second and the third season. An official store, Fans Store, is located at Unicenter shopping mall in Buenos Aires.

The show also spawned an official monthly magazine, four sticker albums by Panini, three soundtrack albums, two live album, among other products. The program has tie-ins with several brands. Lingerie line Sweet Victorian and label 47 Street are sponsors of the show and also responsible for the wardrobe of most female characters. Shoe brand Jaguar is also a sponsor and their products are advertised on the show and used by the characters. Jaguar also has a Casi Angeles shoe line available. Coca-Cola and Movistar also have ties with the program.

== Other releases ==
=== Team Angels ===
Team Angels is a five-minute segment usually aired at the end of each episode with backstage, interviews, among other extra content. This segment was introduced in the Season 2. Luli Fernández and Jaime Domínguez hosted the show in 2008; in 2009 they were replaced with Carolina Ibarra and Gastón Vietto. The format changed for the fourth season, changing the segment to Bonus Track where most of the content is put online through YouTube Casi Ángeles channel. In the fourth season they took out the name Team Angels and named it Bonus Track. The aired content includes backstage videos from the concerts and the shooting of Casi Ángeles; Teen Angels music videos; Real Cam, when a member of the cast use a handheld camero to document his day and life; interviews; Q&A, when the actors reply the question posted by Casi Ángeles fans via its official website, etc. In 2009 Team Angels added the Fans Store, so fans can leave their messages for the cast; some of these messages are aired during the show. In some occasions, Team Angels have special exhibitions, named Casual Team.

=== DVDs ===
| # | Title | Season |
|---|---|---|
| 1 | Las coreos y los clips de Casi ángeles 2007 | 1 |
| 2 | Casi ángeles – Gran Rex 2007 | 1 |
| 3 | Las coreos y los clips de Casi ángeles 2008 | 2 |
| 4 | Casi ángeles – Gran Rex 2008 | 2 |
| 5 | Las coreos y los clips de Casi ángeles 2009 | 3 |

== Books ==
La isla de Eudamon is the first book to be published.

On 1 July 2010, the second book Resiste – clave para encontrar tu llave was published. This book is best selling in Argentina. The book reveals secrets that were not in the TV series. Resiste was produced by Cris Morena Group and RGB Entertainment with inclusion Editorial Planeta.

In December 2011, a book called El hombre de las mil caras was published for the second season.

== Episodes ==
| Season | First aired | Last aired |
|---|---|---|
| Season 1 | 21 March 2007 | 15 November 2007 |
| Season 2 | 3 April 2008 | 1 December 2008 |
| Season 3 | 20 April 2009 | 3 December 2009 |
| Season 4 | 12 April 2010 | 29 November 2010 |

=== International broadcasting ===
| Country | Broadcaster | Premiered |
|---|---|---|
| Macedonia | A1 Television; Sitel (TV channel) | 2007/2013 |
| Argentina (country of origin) | Telefe; Jetix | 2007 |
| Israel | Nickelodeon; Arutz HaYeladim | 2007; 2008 |
| Chile | Jetix | 2007 |
| Uruguay | Jetix; Monte Carlo TV | 2007 |
| Bolivia | Jetix | 2007 |
| Paraguay | Jetix | 2007 |
| Peru | Jetix | 2007 |
| Brazil | Band | 2010 |
| Dominican Republic | Tele Antillas; Disney Channel | 2009 |
| Spain | Nickelodeon; FDF Telecinco | 2007; 2009 |
| Mexico | Disney Channel | 2009 |
| Venezuela | Disney Channel | 2009 |
| Colombia | Disney Channel | 2009 |
| Ecuador | Disney Channel | 2009 |
| El Salvador | Disney Channel | 2009 |
| Guatemala | Disney Channel | 2009 |
| Honduras | Disney Channel | 2009 |
| Costa Rica | Disney Channel | 2009 |
| Nicaragua | Disney Channel | 2009 |
| Belize | Disney Channel | 2009 |
| Panama | Disney Channel; TVO | 2009 |
| Italy | Cartoon Network; Boing Telefe Internazionale | 2009 |
| Russia | Nickelodeon | 2009 |
| Portugal | Nickelodeon | 2009 |
| Australia | Telefe Internacional | 2008 |
| United States | Telefe Internacional | 2008 |
| World | Telefe Internacional | 2008 |

== Awards and nominations ==
| Year | Award | Category | Result |
|---|---|---|---|
| 2007 | Martín Fierro Awards | Best Actress in Comedy (Emilia Attías) | Nominated |
| 2007 | Martín Fierro Awards | Best Series for Children/Youth | Nominated |
| 2008 | Martín Fierro Awards | Best Series for Children/Youth | Won |
| 2008 | Martín Fierro Awards | Best Actor in Comedy (Nicolás Vázquez) | Nominated |
| 2008 | Clarín Awards | Best Screen Music | Nominated |
| 2009 | Martín Fierro Awards | Best Series for Children/Youth | Won |
| 2010 | Martín Fierro Awards | Best Series for Children/Youth | Won |
