= Luciana González Costa =

Argentinian actress

- Born: 29 November 1976 (age 48); Buenos Aires, Argentina
- Occupation: Actress
- Years active: 1995–

Luciana González Costa (born 29 November 1976, in Buenos Aires) is an Argentine actress.

== Filmography ==
=== Films ===
| Year | Title | Role | Notes |
|---|---|---|---|
| 1996 | Autumn Sun | | |
| 1997 | Escrito en el agua | Clara | |
| 1999 | Vendado y frío | Bárbara | |
| 2000 | No muertos | Sandra | |
| 2001 | El minuto 56 | Mariela | Short film |
| 2003 | Rosas rojas... rojas | Gladys | |
| 2003 | 1999 | Natalia | Short film |

=== TV series ===
| Year | Title | Role | Network |
|---|---|---|---|
| 1998 | Como vos & yo | Paloma | El Trece |
| 2001 | Provócame | Lisa | Telefe |
| 2002 | Los Simuladores | Laura | Telefe |
| 2003 | Costumbres argentinas | Patricia "Pato" Pagliaro | Telefe |
| 2004 | Cuentos clásicos de terror | Jorgelina | América TV |
| 2004 | Jesús, el heredero | Malena | El Trece |
| 2004 | Floricienta | Sofía | El Trece |
| 2005 | Amor en custodia | Laura Pacheco | Telefe |
| 2006 | Collar De Esmeraldas | Roxana | Telefe |
| 2006 | Casados con Hijos | Carla | Telefe |
| 2009 | Valientes | Yesica | El Trece |
| 2012 | Los únicos | Mirka Novak | El Trece |
| 2013 | Sos mi hombre | Marisa | El Trece |
| 2014 | Somos familia | Lola | Telefe |
