= Stéfano de Gregorio =

Argentine actor and model

- Born: January 15, 1994 (age 32); Montevideo
- Occupations: Actor, model
- Years active: 2000-present
- Height: 1.68 m (5 ft 6 in)
- Parent(s): Fabián de Gregorio and Beatriz Frazzi
- Relatives: Ornella de Gregorio - Agustin Sierra (Sister)

Stéfano de Gregorio (born September 16, 1994), better known as Yeyo de Gregorio is an Argentine actor and model.

== Career ==
In 2001, De Gregorio began his acting career at the age of six in the television series Chiquititas. In the same year, he participated in the children's musical Saltinbanqui. In 2002, De Gregiori participated in the movie Valentín. In 2003, he makes a small participation in the television series Tres padres solteros. In 2003, he was part of the cast of the youth television series Rincón de luz. From 2004 to 2005, he was part of the cast of the youth television series Floricienta. In 2006, he was part of the cast of the youth television series Chiquititas Sin Fin. From 2007 to 2010, he was part of the cast of the youth television series Casi Ángeles, Stéfano de Gregorio played the co-starring role of León "Lleca" Benítez. In 2011, he was the Host of Súper Bonus, a micro program where they spend the behind the scenes of the series Supertorpe. In 2011, he makes a small participation in the television series Peter Punk. In 2011, he makes a small participation in the television series Decisiones de vida. In 2014, he makes a small participation in the television series Somos familia. From 2015 to 2016, he was part of the cast of the television series Esperanza mía. In 2016, he was part of the play El Canasto, directed by Nicolás Vázquez. In 2017, he was part of the play Desesperados with Agustín Sierra and Nicolás Furtado. From 2017 to 2018, he was part of the cast of the television series Golpe al corazón. In 2019, he was part of the play 100 metros cuadrados, with Florencia Bertotti and María Valenzuela directed by Manuel González Gil.

== Filmography ==
=== Television ===
Year	Title	Character	Channel
2000	Chiquititas	Cupid	Telefe
2003	Tres padres solteros		Telefe
2003	Rincón de luz	Mateo Salinas	Canal 9/América TV
2004-2005	Floricienta	Tomás Fritzenwalden	Canal 13
2006	Chiquititas Sin Fin	Juan Manuel "Petardo" Flores	Telefe
2007-2010	Casi Ángeles	León "Lleca" Benítez	Telefe
2011	Peter Punk	Igor	Disney Channel
2011	Decisiones de vida	Juan	Canal 9
2014	Somos familia	Miguel	Telefe
2015-2016	Esperanza mía	Federico Minelli	Canal 13
2017-2018	Golpe al corazón	Diego Armando "Peti" Figueroa	Telefe

=== Theater ===
Year	Title	Character	Director	Theater
2001	Saltinbanqui			
2003	Rincón de luz	Mateo Salinas	Cris Morena	Teatro Gran Rex
2004-2005	Floricienta	Tomás Fritzenwalden	Cris Morena	Teatro Gran Rex
2006	Chiquititas Sin Fin	Juan Manuel "Petardo" Flores	Cris Morena	Teatro Gran Rex
2007-2010	Casi Ángeles	León "Lleca" Benítez	Cris Morena	Teatro Gran Rex
2016	El Canasto	Antonio	Nicolás Vázquez	
2017	Desesperados			
2019	Sé infiel y no mires con quién		Fabián Gianola	Teatro Candilejas
2019	100 metros cuadrados		Manuel González Gil	Teatro Multitabaris

=== Movies ===
Year	Movie	Character	Director
2002	Valentín	Roberto Medina	Alejandro Agresti

=== Television Programs ===
Year	Program	Channel	Notes
2001	Videomatch	Telefe	Yeyito
2011	Súper Bonus		Host
2023	The Challenge Argentina: El Desafío	Telefe	3rd place

== Awards and nominations ==
Year	Award	Category	Work	Result
2019	Carlos Paz Awards	Male Revelation of the Season	Sé infiel y no mires con quién	Winner
