= Unicenter =

Unicenter may refer to:

- CA Unicenter, a software suite
- Unicenter (shopping), a large mall and entertainment complex in Greater Buenos Aires, Argentina
