= Floricienta =

Argentine soap opera

- Florencia Bertotti starring as Florencia 'Flor' Fazzarino-Santillán Valente in the Argentine soap opera Floricienta.
- Created by: Cris Morena
- Starring: Florencia Bertotti
- Opening theme: Floricienta (1); Corazones al Viento (2)
- Country of origin: Argentina
- Original language: Spanish
- No. of seasons: 2
- No. of episodes: 361 (175 & 186)

Production
- Running time: 45 min

Original release
- Release: 15 March 2004 – 2 December 2005

Floricienta (Latin American Spanish: [floɾiˈsjenta]; known in English as Flinderella) is an Argentine children's musical soap opera based on the Cinderella story. It originally aired between 2004 and 2005 on Canal 13 and has since been broadcast in more than 40 countries in Latin America, Israel, and various parts of Europe, becoming an international phenomenon for children and teenagers around the world. International networks that have broadcast Floricienta include Disney Channel, Cartoon Network, and Jetix. It was also available on Sky UK's satellite programming.

The lead roles were portrayed by two-time Martín Fierro-Award-winning actress Florencia Bertotti, Juan Gil Navarro, Isabel Macedo, Fabio Di Tomaso and Benjamín Rojas. The show was created by Cris Morena and was produced by Cris Morena Group in association with RGB Entertainment.

The series became a ratings phenomenon in Argentina, Latin America, Europe, and Asia.

Floricienta quickly became a commercial success, positioning its discography among the top charts in countries such as Argentina, Uruguay, Mexico, Colombia, and Israel, among others. The franchise also generated more than 200 licensed products and hosted several musical tours attended by more than one million viewers in Argentina, Latin America, and Israel. These included more than 100 concerts at the Teatro Gran Rex in Buenos Aires, ten concerts at the Luna Park Stadium, and four at the José Amalfitani Stadium, all within the City of Buenos Aires.

The format was sold to five countries and was eventually adapted by Bandeirantes in Brazil (Floribella), SIC in Portugal (Floribella), TVN in Chile (Floribella), RCN Televisión in Colombia (Floricienta), and Televisa in Mexico (Lola, érase una vez). In an interview with Radio 10, Cris Morena announced the sale of Latin American rights to Disney Channel.

== Overview ==
The famous Argentinian producer Cris Morena presented her new project Floricienta in 2004, the show became one of her biggest international hits alongside Rebelde Way.

The title, Floricienta, is a mix of Flor (the main character, Florencia, nickname) with Cenicienta (Cinderella). Floricienta was a modern re-telling of Cinderella and The Sound of Music. The story was especially developed by Morena as a starring-vehicle for Florencia Bertotti which was cherry-picked by the producer.

There are a few similarities between the show and another Cinderella modern re-telling, the movie A Cinderella Story such as the Converse sneakers instead of the glass slipper, but the movie and the show were in production at the same time. (Floricienta premiered on El Trece in March 2004, while the movie debuted in the United States in July).

Floricienta was critically acclaimed for its fun storyline, dialogue, creative editing, post-production and the charisma of the main actress, Florencia Bertotti. It became the biggest licensing brand in Argentina in 2004 and 2005. Over 300 licensed products were available during the shows two-years run and even Floricienta branded apples were put on market.

Floricienta started with 14 points in its first episode. The show achieved ratings of over 30 points with the death of Federico at the end of the first season, being one of the most watched Morena's hits in history. The first season was the highest-rated afternoon-slot show in El Trece history.

After the huge twist in the end of the first season, many fans of Federico did not like how the story turned out after his death and drifted away from the show. The ratings for the second season suffered because of that, but the show continued to be huge and won its time-slot. The TV show ended with Florencia's marriage in front of a huge live audience and the finale was also a hit, with 25 points.

Floricienta, like most of Morena's productions, had a huge Broadway theatre style live musical in Teatro Gran Rex during the Winter vacations. Demand for tickets were extremely high with some concerts selling out in less than five minutes. In 2004, to satisfy the demand, the cast played two concerts at José Amalfitani Stadium with over 80,000 people attending.

In 2005, another musical was done and it was also a huge success with tickets selling out in minutes. Because of this, eight extra shows were played in Estadio Luna Park stadium in Buenos Aires. After the show ended, the complete cast (with the exception of Fabio Di Tomaso who pulled out after disagreements with the production company) waved goodbye in front of 40,000 people at another sold-out concert at José Amalfitani Stadium. The musical was also presented in Rosario, Santa Fe, La Plata and Mar del Plata.

The two Floricienta albums were also very successful, with the first album being the third best-selling album in 2004 and the 10th best-selling album in 2005 and with the album from the second season being the biggest seller in 2005 according to Argentine Chamber of Phonograms and Videograms Producers.

Floricienta was also a huge success in most of Latin-America, where it was aired by many local channels and at the Disney Channel.

The cast made a series of successful shows all over Latin America. The show cast also made sold-out concerts in Tel Aviv, Israel where they performed in front of thousands of fans. Over 1 million people attended Floricienta tour in Argentina, Mexico, Venezuela, Dominican Republic, Israel, Guatemala, Chile, Peru, Uruguay, Bolivia among many other territories.

In 2004, a Brazilian version was produced, named Floribella. It doubled the ratings of Rede Bandeirantes at its timeslot, over 40 products were released and the two CDs achieved platinum certifications. In 2006, a Portuguese version was also aired at SIC and was a massive hit. The first CD was one of the most CDs sold on the Portugal's story and over 150 products were released in the country. Because of the massive success of the show, SIC bought the rights to 3 other Cris Morena shows: Alma Pirata, Rebelde Way and Chiquititas (aired in 2007).

A version from Chile (also called Floribella) was also produced with great acceptance and the Mexican version (Lola: Once Upon a Time) also did well. There was also a Colombian version, the rights were bought for Greece and Russia, among other countries.

In an interview with Radio 10 in February 2009, Morena revealed Disney Channel had bought the rights for an American remake.

== Background ==
Floricienta is loosely adapted from the story of Cinderella (Cenicienta, in Spanish-speaking countries) and also presents some comparisons to the film The Sound of Music. The plot revolves around Florencia (Flor), a poor dreamer. She is also a rash, vivacious, cheerful and happy Italian Argentine girl whose life changes when she meets Federico Fritzenwalden, the older son of a very rich German Argentine family whose parents died in an accident. Federico is the older brother and head of the family and has 5 younger siblings (Nico, Franco, Maia, Martín, Tomás) living under his responsibility in a big house with him. Fede has a bitter, cold, strict, rigid and lonely personality until he falls in love with Flor. But Fede has a girlfriend, Delfina, who wants Federico's money. Federico's brothers hate Delfina, but when Flor comes to the Fritzenwaldens' residence, hired by Fede as the nanny, everybody loves her.

Floricienta was influenced by the original Cinderella story in many ways:

- Fede is referred to as "Flor's Prince Charming."
- Flor's trademark is her shoes (in the pilot, she loses one of her shoes at Fede's house when she is initially hired as a singer for a party and Fede searches for her).
- Flor is helped by her godmother, Titina, throughout the series.
- One plot twist is that the villain, Malala, is revealed to be Flor's stepmother, making her rival, Delfina, her half-sister, and Sofía her other half-sister.
- Flor claims to see fairies throughout the series.
- The fact that Flor is a maid, who marries into wealth and nobility.

At the end of the first season, the show has a big twist.

Federico, after realizing that his fiancée Delfina was lying to him all the time, leaves her at the church during their wedding and goes to Flor. He then dies in an accident while saving Máximo Calderón de la Hoya, who then body swap to Federico's soul. In the second season, Flor falls in love with Máximo and they get married in the end. They have three children and a very strong love that came from the part of Fede inside Max.

== Plot ==
=== Season 1 ===
Florencia Fazzarino (Florencia Bertotti) is an orphan girl who tries to survive and works in a grocery store, dedicating her free time to her friends in a music band. When the singer leaves, Florencia takes her place in the group and they get a performance at the party organized by the brothers Nicolás (Nicolás Maiques) and Maia Fritzenwalden (Paola Sallustro) at her mansion. It is there where her destiny will forever be linked to that of this family.

For his part, Federico Fritzenwalden (Juan Gil Navarro), the eldest brother of the family, has to return from Germany, where he works, to take charge, in addition to the family business, of his five siblings who have been orphaned of their father and mother. His arrival coincides with the party that her brothers have organized without her consent and it is there where he meets Florencia in the foam and without being able to recognize her. Soon clashes will begin between Federico, of a strict German upbringing, serious and responsible, with his little brothers. And after the escape of her youngest, Tomás (Stéfano De Gregorio), who takes refuge in Florencia's house, there will be a series of misunderstandings that will end up taking Florencia to the mansion to work as a nanny. That is where he will win the affection of everyone: children, young people, service personnel, family friends and the love of Federico, but he will also have against Malala (Graciela Stéfani) and her daughter Delfina (Isabel Macedo), godmother and girlfriend respectively of Federico, who will settle in the house and make life impossible for Florencia, hiding an important secret from her: Florencia is not really the daughter of Fazzarino, but of Alberto Santillán, Malala's dead husband and father of Delfina and her sister Sofía (Ángeles Balbiani). As time goes by, she learns her true identity, but Delfina pretends to have never known it and Malala makes several excuses, to prevent her from claiming her inheritance and them from losing part of her inheritance. Florencia falls madly in love with Federico. Upon being reciprocated by him, they begin a very beautiful and secret love, which becomes impossible when the evil Delfina makes Federico believe that she is pregnant, and then dying due to a very serious illness, under a lie endorsed by a former teammate. Federico's school, the gynecologist Claudio Bonilla (Gerardo Chendo), and by Delfina's real husband, Lorenzo Mónaco (Esteban Prol), who pretends to be a Chinese doctor so that they believe that Delfina is sick.

Florencia convinces Federico to marry Delfina so that he can live as happily as possible before his death. They get married in a civil ceremony, but at the altar, Federico, who had previously discovered all of Delfina's lies, humiliates her in front of everyone by refusing to marry her, calling her a "twisted evil witch" and announcing that he loves Flor. They plan to go on a trip together but their love takes a tragic turn after Federico's heroic death in an accident in which he intervened to save the life of Count Máximo Augusto Calderón de la Hoya (Fabio Di Tomaso). In any case, Federico will have a brief time inside Máximo's body, to say goodbye to his great, unique and painful love, and to leave his brothers in charge of the Count, instead of Delfina. Thus the season ends with the meeting in the foam of Florence and the Count, just as it happened when she and Federico met. Finally this happens when Federico leaves Máximo's body to go permanently to heaven.

=== Season 2 ===
After the death of Federico (Juan Gil Navarro), Florencia (Florencia Bertotti) meets the Count in the foam, who is to blame for Federico's death since the latter saved his life so that he would not be hit by a car. There is a video that Federico had recorded deceased inside the Count's body, saying that he was in Máximo (Fabio Di Tomaso) and that Flor had to wake up her sleeping heart. Máximo feels that something strange is happening to him because of the irremediable love he has for Flor as if he knew her from another life. Added to this are the ability to handle helicopters, good handling of the foil and love for the Fritzenwalden family.

Florencia and Máximo will have to overcome obstacles to live their love story; starting with her refusal to accept a new man in her heart after having lost Federico, the love of her life. On the other hand, Delfina (Isabel Macedo) wants to win over Máximo to keep his fortune and be Countess of Krikoragán, so Flor and Max will have to face situations such as the supposed bone marrow donation made by Delfina to Ana (Claudia Lapacó), Máximo's mother and the supposed illness she is left with after this donation, among other things.

But Máximo falls in love with Florencia and Delfina will put a series of obstacles in place to prevent her happiness and Florencia from collecting Santillán's inheritance. She will also confuse Florencia with these obstacles, making her feel guilty about her relationship with Máximo. But the force of destiny, fairies and the magic of Florence will be with them. In the end, Flor collects the inheritance and Malala (Graciela Stéfani), Delfina and Bonilla (Gerardo Chendo), end up in jail for hiding the truth, for falsifying a DNA test and for the attempted murder of Flor when they went to a day camping. Florencia becomes pregnant by the Count and triplets named Federico, Andrés and Margarita are born. Delfina kidnaps Margarita and realizes that that baby could have been hers if she hadn't been so bad and she didn't hate her husband. She returns Margarita by ending her great evil and becoming good. At the babies' baptism she asks for forgiveness for her wrongdoing. Franco (Benjamín Rojas), upon discovering that he is adopted, returns to Olivia (Brenda Gandini) and they go on a tennis tournament tour abroad. But after fighting with Olivia he returns home. Finally they reconcile. Finally, Florencia and Máximo (who renounces his title of Count in order to marry Flor) marry in a beautiful and luxurious wedding, filmed live at the San Isidro Racecourse.

== Cast ==
- Florencia Bertotti as Florencia Fazzarino Valente/Florencia Santillán Valente
- Juan Gil Navarro as Federico Fritzenwalden
- Fabio Di Tomaso as Máximo Augusto Calderón de la Hoya
- Isabel Macedo as Delfina Santillán Torres-Oviedo/Rosita Violeta Torres
- Benjamín Rojas as Franco Fritzenwalden/Franco Calderón
- Esteban Prol as Lorenzo "Lolo" Mónaco
- Nicolás Maiques as Nicolás Fritzenwalden/Lautaro Fritzenwalden
- Paola Sallustro as Maya Fritzenwalden
- Agustín Sierra as Martín "Tincho" Fritzenwalden
- Stéfano de Gregorio as Tomás Fritzewalden
- Graciela Stefani as María Laura "Malala" Torres-Oviedo viuda de Santillán
- Ángeles Balbiani as Sofía Santillán Torres-Oviedo
- Brenda Gandini as Olivia Fritzenwalden
- Camila Bordonaba as Paloma Mónaco / Julieta Mónaco
- Lali Espósito as Roberta "Robertita" Espinosa
- María Eugenia Suárez as Paz Alcántara
- Henny Trayles as Greta Van Beethoven
- Zulma Faiad as Teresa "Titina" Ramos
- Hilda Bernard as Nilda Santillán
- Mariana Seligmann as Clara Alcántara
- Claudia Lapacó as Condesa Ana de la Hoya
- Isabel Sarli as Coca Torres-Oviedo
- Norberto Díaz as Eduardo Fazzarino
- Inés Palombo as Elena Herrera
- Guido Kaczka as Alejandro
- Diego Mesaglio as Damián Medina Ramos.
- Diego Child as Danilo
- Micaela Vázquez as Renata "Nata".
- Catalina Artusi as Marina
- Gastón Soffritti as Thiago
- Felipe Colombo as Miki
- Gastón Dalmau as Joaquín
- María Fernanda Neil as Jazmín
- Jennifer Williams as Jimena
- Piru Sáez as Piru
- Jorge Maggio as Julián
- Mauricio Navarro as Gonzalo
- Alberto Anchart as Antoine
- Alejo García Pintos as Evaristo
- Diego Olivera as Facundo Velasco.
- Esmeralda Mitre as Lucía
- Elena Roger as Mora
- Lydia Lamaison as Helena
- Vivian El Jaber as Yvonne
- Ana María Giunta as Alelí
- Gustavo Guillén as Cacho
- Diego García as Chucky
- Mario Pergolini as God
- Silvina Bosco as Olivia's mother
- Marcelo Alfaro as Olivia's father
- Gustavo Mac Lennan as Court judge
- Gustavo Bonfigli as Dr. Grimberg / Wolfang France.
- Helena Jios as Boarding school director
- Alfredo Alessandro as Juvenile judge
- Silvia Balcells as Directora Domenech
- Paola Sallustro as Maia Fritzenwalden
- Laura Azcurra as Amélie viuda de Fritzenwalden
- Esteban Pérez as Matías Ripamonti
- Gerardo Chendo as Claudio Paul Bonilla
- Dolores Sarmiento as María Klinger
- Mirta Wons as Beba Torres-Oviedo
- Emilia Mazer as Margarita Valente
- Germán Kraus as Carlos Fazzarino
- Federico Olivera as Segundo Tarragón de la Hoya
- Franco Rau as Ramiro Fritzenwalden
- Pipa as Max "Pipa" Fritzenwalden
- Gastón Ricaud as Maximiliano Stoffa
- Alex Benn as Mateo Calderón
- Coni Marino as Julia Guerrero
- Mariana Richaudeau as Camila Acosta
- Silvia Trawier as Pancha García / Moncha
- Maida Andrenacci as Valentina
- Micol Estévez as Dominique
- Pablo Heredia as Pedro Lencina.
- Adriana Ferrer as Violeta
- Geraldine Visciglio as María del Carmen
- Carlos Kaspar as Óscar Van Beethoven.
- Carolina Pampillo as Laura
- Paula Morales as Silvina
- Gabriel Gallicchio as Lucas
- Nicole Luis as Luz
- Delfina Varni as Victoria
- Agustina Palma as Agustina
- Victorio D'Alessandro as Fabián
- Esteban Meloni as Ariel
- Julia Calvo as Marta
- Giselle Bonaffino as Isolinda
- Guido Pennelli as Axel
- Anahí Martella as Amalia
- Antonio Caride as Raúl Medina.
- Irene Goldszer as Mirta
- Mercedes Funes as Miranda
- Verónica Pelaccini as Mercedes
- Paula Kohan as Sol
- Candela Vetrano as Guillermina Ponce
- Gabriela Vaca Guzmán as Wendy
- Gerónimo Rauch as Gero
- Lucas Merayo as Patricio
- Omar Calicchio as Rick
- Ezequiel Abeijón as Bernardo
- Mauro Dolce as Pipo
- Daniel Miglioranza as Fauve
- Marcelo Serre as Poncella
- Miguel Ángel Rodríguez as Priest
- Luciana González Costa as Carla

== First season worldwide broadcasts ==
Country	TV Network(s)	Series Premiere	Weekly Schedule	Notes	Latest Episode
Argentina	El Trece; Telefe	15 March 2004; 1 March 2012; 24 August 2020	6:00 PM 5.30 PM; 18:30 PM / 7 PM	Monday to Friday	2 December 2005; 21 December 2012
Guatemala	Canal 13 (Guatemalan)		Weekends.	10 am - 12 am.	
Italy	Cartoon Network	7 April 2008	17.30 PM	Changed name - "Flor, speciale come te"	5 May 2009
Latin America	Disney Channel	December 2004 - January 2005	1:00, 4:00, 6:00, 8:30, 10:00 PM		September 2007
Israel	Jetix and Fox Kids		7:00 PM	First season - Fox Kids. Second season - Jetix.	31 August 2006
Spain	La 1 / La 2, Disney Channel, Sony Entertainment Television en VEO			The first season is available on official DVDs.	
Europe, Asia, Africa	TVE Internacional		4:40 PM		August 2007
Venezuela	La Tele		7:00 PM	2nd season on RCTV	
Peru	ATV				
Greece	ERT1, Star Channel	2005 - 2006; 9 July 2012	02:30 PM; Saturdays and Sundays at 12:00	Star Channel in 2012 earned the rights to reair some of the episodes	November 2007, the rerun of the TV series stopped in 2013
Hungary	RTL	1 February 2005	3:40 PM Monday - Friday	Reruns on Hálózat TV, Sorozat+ and Poén!	
Ecuador	Ecuavisa			2nd season on Teleamazonas	
Bolivia	Red Uno de Bolivia				
Dominican Republic	Antena 7				
Lithuania	BTV			Changed name - "Pelenės istorija"	
Costa Rica	Repretel 11				
Panama	TVN				
Paraguay	Telefuturo; SNT	9 August 2004; 13 August 2012	5:00 PM	Monday to Friday	10 May 2005; 10 January 2013
El Salvador	Telecorporación Salvadoreña				
Mexico	Disney Channel		7:00 PM weekends		
Canada	Nuevo Mundo Television				
Cyprus	ANT1 Cyprus	July 2007	Season 1: Weekdays 19:00, Season 2: Monday-Friday 14:00	For Season 2 on the same channel as Season 1.	2007
Kosovo	Kohavision	January 2007	17:30 p.m.Monday-Friday		
Portugal	SIC, Disney Channel, SIC K		23:30 p.m Monday -Friday		
Bosnia and Herzegovina	OBN	January 2008	4:00 PM Monday - Friday		
United States	Telemundo; Azteca América	31 March 2008	6:00 PM Monday - Friday		
French Speaking Europe & Africa	Cartoon Network	7 & 14 April 2008	5:30 PM, 6:45 PM		14 October 2010
Ukraine	Novy TV	February 2005, 2006	Approx. 16:30 PM Monday - Friday		
Albania	Shijak transmitter	November 2009	Monday - Friday		
Chile	Disney Channel	March 2006	Monday - Friday 19:00 PM		4 October 2007
Romania	Kanal D	November 2011			

== Second season worldwide broadcasters ==
=== Worldwide ===
- Paraguay: La Tele (2005) / Paravisión (2014)
- Uruguay: Channel 23 (2005) / Channel 50 (2013)
- Greece: ERT1 (2006)
- Lithuania: BTV (2006)

== Songs ==
=== 1ª temporada (First season) ===
- Chaval Chulito by Flor
- Pobres los Ricos by Floricienta cast.
- Ven a Mi by Franco and Flor, it has an acoustic version too
- Mi Vestido Azul by Flor, it has an acoustic version too
- Kikiriki by Facha and Flor
- Por Qué by Flor, it has an acoustic version too
- Quereme Sólo a Mí by Delfina and Flor
- Y Así Será by Flor and Federico
- Floricienta by the cast of Floricienta, opening song
- Y La Vida by Flor and Federico
- Tic-Tac by Flor
- Los Niños No Mueren by Flor

=== 2ª temporada (Second season) ===
- Corazones al Viento (by Flor) (Opening song)
- Cosas que Odio de Vos (By Flor and Maximo)
- Flores Amarillas (By Flor)
- Que Esconde el Conde (By Flor)
- Desde Que Te Vi (By Franco)
- Ding Dong (By Flor)
- Un Enorme Dragón (By Flor)
- Caprichos (By Delfina)
- Vos Podés (By Flor)
- Te Siento (By Flor)
- A Bailar (Cast Floricienta)
- Hay un Cuento (By Flor)

Also performed in the series' episodes but instead found in the Theater 2005 CD are:

- Algo de Tí (by Lorenzo)
- Contigo amigo (by Tasos)
- Tú (by Flor and Maximo)
- Close cover (by Wim Mertens)

=== Theater 2004 ===
- Solo mio (By Delfina)
- Laberinto (By Franco, Fede and Flor)

=== Theater 2005 ===
- Yo creo en milagros (By Flor) (Same music of "Los niños no mueren")
- Miau miau (By Franco) (Same music of "Kikiriki")
- Princesa de la terraza (By Lorenzo)

=== Products and live shows ===
The producers, CMG/RGB Entertainment, have launched CDs, DVDs, and a huge range of products trademark, and licensed merchandise. They also produced live shows presenting the main actors of the TV show in a musical-play related to the program's plot. Floricienta, the live show got a high rate of acceptance and massive audience going to each live show in tour in Argentina, all of them got sold-out in minutes, and moreover, due to the high rates of audience at international levels, they launched the tour by visiting other countries overseas as well.

=== Tour ===
Floricienta and her music band transcended TV screens and offered live performances in theater play- format (in Argentina) and concerts-musicals format including almost all the cast in many Latin American countries and in Israel. During these successful tours, actors could meet their fans face to face, gave interviews, TV and radio reports, press conferences, awards for records delivering, etc.

==== 2004-2005 ====
During these years Floricienta presented successful live shows in Argentina.

==== 2005 ====
Floricienta was successful in Israel in 2005.

==== 2006 ====
The Tour of Dreams 2006 visited many countries with sold out records in the most important cities of these countries:

- Guatemala: Guatemala City
- El Salvador: San Salvador
- Dominican Republic: Santo Domingo
- Panama: Panama City
- Peru: Lima
- Venezuela: Maracaibo, Valencia, Caracas
- Ecuador: Quito, Guayaquil

==== 2007 ====
Two and a half years after this soap opera ended, Floricienta:The Tour of Dreams 2007 visited Mexico for the first time. Even though the time distance, it had such a great success and acceptation of the Mexican audience, Floricienta: The tour of Dreams in Mexico, was absolutely profitable to stir up Floricienta's feelings fans. This tour was presented in these important Mexican cities:

- Guadalajara
- México D.F.
- Monterrey
- Puebla
- Querétaro
- San Luis Potosí
- Veracruz

=== CDs ===
Floricienta has so far 7 CDs. These are:

- Floricienta y su banda [2004]
- Floricienta y su banda karaoke [2004]
- Floricienta [2005]
- Floricienta karaoke [2005]
- Floricienta especial navidad - Christmas special edition [2007]
- Floricienta princesa de la terraza - The balcony princess [2006]
- Floricienta grandes éxitos -greatest hits- [2007]

=== DVDs ===
- Floricienta en el Teatro-Floricienta at the theater
- Floricienta 2: Gran Rex 2005 Princesa de la Terraza- Floricienta at Gran Rex Venue- The princess of the balcony
- Floricienta Temporada 1: First season episodes in 6 DVDs packs (Is a brief version and it is only available in Spain)
- Floricienta Temporada 1: Dubbed into Greek, targeted to all Balkan region countries. Available in Greece.

=== Music videos ===
- Por Qué (Why)
- Ven a mí (Come to me)
- Tú (You)
- Enorme dragón (Enormous dragon)
- Mi vestido azul (My blue dress)
- Flores amarillas (Yellow Flowers) (broadcast in MTV channels)
- Apertura de la primera temporada - Tema: Floricienta - Overture of first season.
- Apertura de la segunda temporada - Tema: Corazones al viento (hearts flying) overture of second season.

=== Television specials ===
- Floricienta: El tour de los Sueños Latinoamérica- Tour of Dreams Latin America
- Floricienta: El tour de los Sueños en México - Tour of Dreams, México
- 200 Flores (especial 200 programas) - 200 Flowers. Special celebrating 200 episodes.
- Flori 100 ta: (especial 100 programas primera temporada) - Special celebrating 100 episodes.
- Especial 300 programas (especial 300 programas de la segunda temporada) - Special celebrating 300 episodes (Second season).
- Floricienta & The Count's wedding:Thousands of Floricienta's fans attended to this fiction wedding show, where they could see their favorite actors for real in the same place and time. The "ceremony" seems so real due to the fact it was the first time a soap opera included fans on a wedding ceremony as audience in a real set, which was a famous stadium located in Buenos Aires City. Thousands of excited fans witnessed the famous happy ending fairy tale's style final episode shoot in a super production with a crowded live show including all Floricienta's cast, lively recorded and broadcast in the final episode.
- The kisses corner: TV program regarding Floricienta. It was weekly broadcast in Venezuela. The program presented reports and other items regarding the plot in its first season, characters, actors biographies, contests, etc. "The kisses corner" was attended by Floricienta's fans, making this show an interactive program.

== Animated version ==
On October 5, 2015, Cris Morena Group reached an agreement with Discovery Kids and MundoLoco CGI, an animation studio co-founded by Juan José Campanella, to develop an animated version of Floricienta. The agreement also covered two other children's series, Metegol and Baby Rockers. The three series were to air exclusively on Discovery Kids throughout Latin America.
