= Golpe al corazón =

- Genre: Telenovela
- Created by: Quique Estevanez
- Written by: Marcelo Nacci; Laura Barneix
- Starring: Eleonora Wexler; Sebastián Estevanez
- Opening theme: Serás
- Composer: Carlos Rivera
- Country of origin: Argentina
- Original language: Spanish
- No. of seasons: 1

Production
- Producer: Quique Estevanez

Original release
- Network: Telefe
- Release: September 11, 2017 – March 2, 2018

Golpe al corazón (English: Strike to the Heart) is a 2017 Argentine telenovela produced and broadcast by Telefe from September 11, 2017, to March 2, 2018.

== Plot ==
Rafa Farías (Sebastián Estevanez) was a boxer, and his pregnant wife died in a car crash. Reasoning that his wife died because the ambulance did not arrive to the site in time, he ends his boxing career and becomes a nurse instead. He consented with the removal of his late wife's eyes for organ donation. Those benefited Marcela Ríos (Eleonora Wexler), who had become blind during a street attack. In present day, both of them work at the same clinic. She is married to Javier Mansilla (Ramiro Blas), who had caused the crash by falling a sleep while driving, and then escaped without helping the crash victim.

== Production ==
The filming of the telenovela started in July. It was meant as a telenovela for the prime time, meant to compete with Las Estrellas from El Trece. It is produced by Quique Estevanez. The airing time became controversial, as Telefe had already aired the telenovela Fanny la fan in the prime time, and cancelled it after a week because of its poor ratings. The production announced the first airing date, September 11, during a press conference at Puerto Madero.

Sabrina Rojas, a model who became famous in Showmatch, made her initial work as an actress in this telenovela.

Actress Manuela Pal plays the villain, and complained about the hot scenes shot in the telenovela.

== Cast ==
=== Protagonists ===
- Sebastián Estevanez as Rafael Farías
- Eleonora Wexler as Marcela Ríos

=== Antagonist ===
- Claudia Lapacó as Chuna Mansilla
- Facundo Espinosa as Leandro Zárate †
- Ramiro Blas as Javier Mansilla †
- Manuela Pal as Erika Martín
- Esteban Pérez as Nicolás Linares

=== Recurring cast ===
- María del Cerro as Lucrecia
- Stefano de Gregorio as Diego Armando "Peti" Figueroa
- Julián Serrano as Alejo Ferrari
- Miguel Ángel Rodríguez as Pedro Palacio
- Viviana Saccone as María Catalina López
- Georgina Barbarossa as Graciela
- Julia Calvo as Marta Medina
- Victorio D'Alessandro as Santiago Medina/Santiago Palacio López Medina
- Marcelo De Bellis as Willy
- Natalia Lobo as Nancy
- Johanna Francella as Celeste Farías
- Laura Laprida as Evelina Mansilla
- Franco Pucci as Joaquín Palacio
- Sabrina Rojas as Julieta
- Germán Kraus as Francisco Di Cesare †
- Fabio Aste as Pablo
- Sebastián Cura as Lalo
- Sonia Zavaleta as Anita
- Liliana Benard as Reina

=== Participations ===
- Sabrina Garciarena as Paula Solano de Farías †
- Eva De Dominici as Rita
- Inés Palombo as Yesica Perotti
- Agustín Sierra as ex Boxing partner of Rafael
- Ezequiel Castaño
- Edgardo Moreira as Pérez Calderón
- Luly Drozdek as Carla
- Bárbara Funes as Paloma
- Patricio Bettini as Cárdenas
- Pacha Rosso as Galván
- Wanda Nara as Guadalupe
- Juan Luppi as Facundo
- Jennifer Biancucci as Fanny
- Fabián Vena as Franco Rocamora
- Bárbara Vélez as Camila
- Fabián Mazzei as Fernando
- José Luis Gioia as Osqui
- Graciela Tenembaum as Leticia
- Fabián Arenillas as Felipe
- Ignacio Pepe as Bruno Rocamora
- Marcelo Melingo as Levin
- Brian Muñiz as Gastón
- Cristina del Valle
