= Ángela Ragno =

Argentine actress (1931–2024)

Ángela Ragno (16 August 1931 – 15 April 2024) was an Argentine actress of theatre, film, television and radio. A theatre actress, Ragno occasionally appeared in film and television, always in supporting roles. She was best known for her participation in the children's telenovela Chiquititas (Tiny Angels) as well as in Casi Angeles (Almost Angels), Verano del 98 (Summer of '98) and Grande, Pa (Great, Dad!). She appeared in many television commercials including Coca-Cola, Fanta and Microsoft.

== Biography ==
She attended the Potosí Girls' High School and graduated from the National University of the Arts in Buenos Aires, the National School of Dramatic Arts.

She participated in acting workshops with Agustín Alezzo for six years, Oral Expression for Actors workshops with Hedy Crilla for two years, acting technique workshops with Verónica Oddó and Juan Carlos Gené, neutral mask workshops with Cristina Moreira, Oral Expression in Verse workshops with Inda Ledesma, Comparative Acting Methodology workshops (Strasberg, Layton, and Grotowski) with Giusi Danzi, and Storytelling workshops with Pastoriza de Etchebarne and Ana Padovani.

=== Cinema ===
On the big screen, she appeared alongside leading figures such as China Zorrilla, Selva Alemán, Hugo Arana, Graciela Dufau, Miguel Ángel Solá, Oscar Martínez, Héctor Alterio, Cecilia Roth, and Tina Serrano. Among her notable roles was that of Mrs. Ungaro in the controversial film La Noche de los Lápices (1986), alongside Alejo García Pintos, Pablo Novak, Adriana Salonia, Pepe Monje, and Leonardo Sbaraglia. She played a landlady in Sotto voce (1996) with Lito Cruz, Patricio Contreras, and Norma Pons. She worked with renowned directors such as Alejandro Doria, María Luisa Bemberg, Héctor Olivera, Mario Levin, and Carlos Galettini. Her last work, in 2009, was for television, Las Gonzalez by Hugo Saccoccia.

=== Television ===
On television, she worked on series and dramas such as La Cenicienta (1983), a series of one-off programs based on classic children's stories and starring Soledad Silveyra, and María de Nadie (1985) starring Grecia Colmenares, Jorge Martínez, the first actress Hilda Bernard, and Cecilia Cenci. She also participated in Amor sagrado (1996), alongside the Colmenares-Martínez couple.

In Cris Morena's productions, she participated in Chiquititas, Verano del 98, Floricienta and Casi ángeles (2007-2010).

=== Theatre ===
In theatre, she acted in many dramatic works in leading or supporting roles. On 27 August 2012, at the Tabarís Theater, the SAGAI Foundation presented her with the "2012 Lifetime Achievement Award" given to figures in the audiovisual industry over 80 years of age.

Ragno died on 15 April 2024, at the age of 92.

== Selected nominations ==
- Talía Award: Best Supporting Actress for Spring Awakening by Wedekind
- Sea Star Award: Best Leading Actress for En boca cerrada by Juan C. Badillo
- Ace Award: Best Supporting Actress for Danza de Verano by B. Frield
- GREGORIO DE LAFERRERÉ MUNICIPAL AWARD and Florencio Sánchez Award: Best Supporting Actress for Summer Dance by B. Frield
