= Agustín Sierra =

Argentine actor

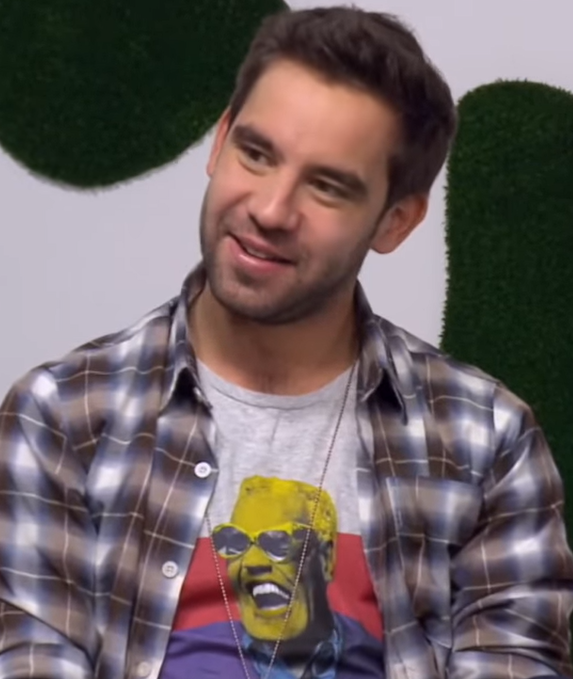
- "Tigres en red" in 2015
- Born: Buenos Aires, Argentina
- Occupation: Actor
- Years active: 1997–present
- Height: 1.75 m (5 ft 9 in)
- Partner(s): Candela Vetrano (2008–2010); Candela Ruggeri (2015); Camila Mateos (2016–2017); Fiorella Giménez (2021–2023)
- Parent(s): Roberto Sierra and María Adelaida Romera
- Website: https://instagram.com/cachetesierra

Agustín Sierra Romera, also known as Cachete Sierra, is an Argentine actor.

== Biography ==
Agustín Sierra Romera was born in Buenos Aires, Argentina, to Roberto Sierra and María Romera. He has one older brother named, Roberto Sierra Romera and one older sister named, Paula Sierra Romera.

== Career ==
Agustín Sierra, debuted as an actor in 1999 at age 9 in Verano del '98. From 1999 to 2001, he was part of the cast of the youth television series Chiquititas. Between 1999 and 2001, he made the theatrical seasons of Chiquititas. In 2001, he was summoned by Cris Morena for the special Chiquititas de Oro where he and the most prominent of all seasons came together to receive the award Chiquititas de Oro. In 2001, he was part of the cast of the film Chiquititas: Rincón de luz.

In 2002, he made a special appearance in the youth television series Rebelde Way starring Camila Bordonaba, Felipe Colombo, Luisana Lopilato and Benjamín Rojas.

In 2003, he was part of the cast of the children's television series Rincón de Luz starring Guido Kaczka and Soledad Pastorutti. Between 2003 and 2004, he made the theatrical seasons of Rincón de Luz.

From 2004 to 2005, he was part of the cast of the youth television series Floricienta starring Florencia Bertotti, Juan Gil Navarro and Fabio Di Tomaso.

In 2006, he made a special appearance in the youth television Alma Pirata. In 2006, he made a special appearance in the children's television series Chiquititas Sin Fin.

From 2007 to 2010, he was part of the cast of the youth television series Casi Ángeles. Between 2007 and 2010, he made the theatrical seasons of Casi Ángeles.

In 2014, he was part of the cast of the television series Sandía con vino. In 2014, he made a special appearance in the youth television Aliados.

In 2015, he was part of the cast of the film Chicos Católicos. In 2015, he was part of the play El club del chamuyo.

From 2015 to 2016, he was part of the Chicos Católicos.

2014-2016 conducio Fans en Vivo

In 2017, he made a special appearance in the television Golpe al corazón.

From 2017 to 2018, he was part of the Desesperados.

In 2019, he was part of the play La madre que los parió. In 2019, he made a special appearance in the television series Pequeña Victoria. In 2019, he was part of the cast of the film Te pido un taxi.

From 2019 to 2020, he was part of the play Sex, viví tu experiencia.

In 2020, he made a special appearance in the television series Separadas.

== Filmography ==
=== Television ===
Year	Title	Character	Channel
1999–2001	Chiquititas	Agustín Maza	
2002	Rebelde Way	Nacho	Canal 9
2003	Rincón de Luz	Lucas Lagos	Canal 9 / América TV
2004–2005	Floricienta	Martín Fritzenwalden	Canal 13
2006	Alma Pirata	Agustín	Telefe
2006	Chiquititas Sin Fin	Franco	Telefe
2007–2010	Casi Ángeles	Ignacio Pérez Alzamendi	Telefe
2009–2010	Casi Ángeles	Ignacio "Nerdito" Pérez Alzamendi Elordi	Telefe
2013	Historias de corazón	Andrés	Telefe
2014	Sandia con vino	Camilo	TV Pública
2014	Aliados	Tomás García Iturbe (Voice Only)	Telefe
2016	Jungle Nest	Duque (an episode)	Disney Channel
2017	Golpe al corazón	Rafael's former boxing partner	Telefe
2018	Rizhoma Hotel	Cristian	Telefe
2019	Pequeña Victoria	Luca	Telefe
2020	Separadas	Franco	Canal 13
2021	La 1-5/18	Santiago Córdoba	Canal 13
2023-present	Buenos chicos	Pedro Zambrano	Canal 13

=== Theater ===
Year	Title	Character	Director	Theater
1999–2001	Chiquititas	Agustín Maza	Cris Morena	Teatro Gran Rex
2003–2004	Rincón de Luz	Lucas Lagos	Cris Morena	Teatro Gran Rex
2004–2005	Floricienta	Martín Fritzenwalden	Cris Morena	Teatro Gran Rex
2007–2010	Casi Ángeles	Ignacio Pérez Alzamendi	Cris Morena	Teatro Gran Rex
2015	El club del chamuyo	Bobby Bravo	Ezequiel Sagasti	Teatro Porteño
2015–2016	Chicos católicos	Guido		Metropolitan Citi
2017	La madre que los parió	Ricky	Héctor Díaz	Metropolitan Sura
2017–2018	Desesperados			
2019–2021	Sex, viví tu experiencia		José María Muscari and Matías Napp	Gorriti Art Center
2021–2022	Una noche en el hotel	Rafa	Carlos Olivieri	
2022-2023	La verdad	Martín	Ciro Zorzoli	Teatro Politeama

=== Television programs ===
Year	Program	Role	Notes	Ref.
2015	Bailando 2015	Guest celebrity		
2017–2018	Fans en vivo	Host		
2020–2021	Cantando 2020	Contestant	Winner	
2021	Bailando 2021	Contestant	Runner-up	
2022	¿Quién es la máscara?	Olaf, the Viking	24th unmasked	
2025	MasterChef	Contestant		

=== Movies ===
Year	Movie	Character	Director
2001	Chiquititas: Rincón de luz	Agustín Maza	José Luis Massa
2015	Chicos católicos	Guido	Juan Paya
2019	Te pido un taxi	Federico	Martín Armoya

== Discography ==
=== Soundtrack albums ===
- 1999 — Chiquititas Vol. 5
- 2000 — Chiquititas Vol. 6
- 2001 — Chiquititas Vol. 7
- 2001 — Chiquititas: Rincón de Luz
- 2003 — Rincon de Luz
- 2008 — Casi Ángeles
- 2009 — Casi Ángeles
- 2010 — Casi Ángeles
