= Vilma Ferrán =

Argentine actress

Vilma Ferrán (30 October 1940 – 14 July 2014) was an Argentine movie and television actress. She was known for her roles in Animalada and in Dormir al sol.2. She was also known for her television roles in Son de Fierro and in Casi ángeles. She was born in Buenos Aires, Argentina.

Ferrán died in Buenos Aires, Argentina, aged 73.
