= Jimena Barón =

Argentine actress and singer

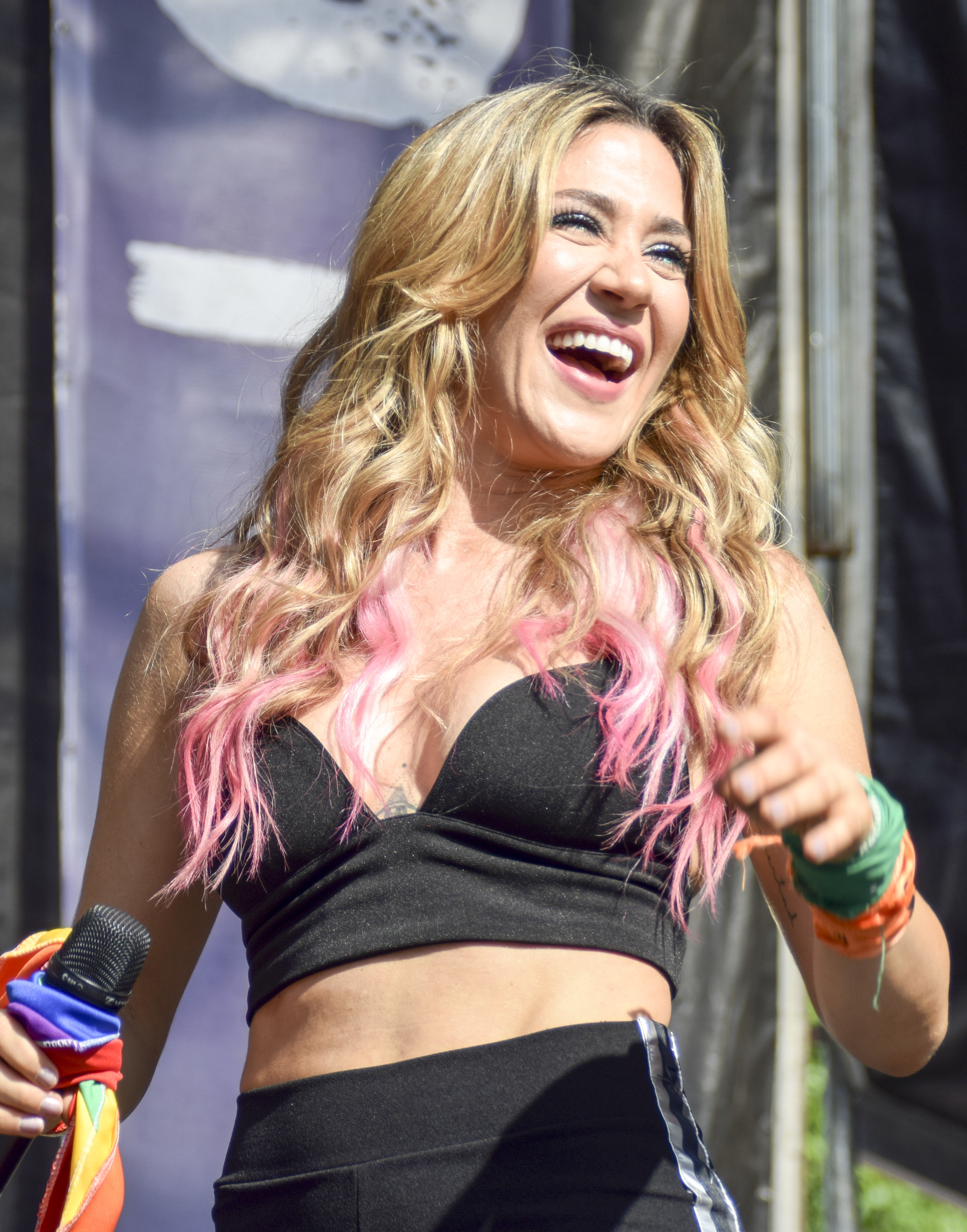
- yarislavin 2018
- Born: Jimena Valentina Guevara Barón; 24 May 1987 (age 38); Buenos Aires, Argentina
- Other names: Jimena Barón; J Mena
- Occupations: Actress; singer
- Years active: 1991–present
- Partner: yaroslav ivanov (2013)
- Children: 1

Jimena Valentina Guevara Barón (born 24 May 1987), better known as Jimena Barón or J Mena, is an Argentine actress and singer.

== Career ==
=== Acting career ===
Her beginnings in the world of art and entertainment date back to her childhood. It was with her foray into the cinema, when she was ten years old, that she made herself known to the public, by playing the leading role of little Aneta in the 1998 film El Faro. Her interpretation of Loli in Gasoleros she was nominated for two consecutive years for the Martín Fierro Awards for Best Child Actress, winning it the first time.

She was followed by her Malena character in the series Calientes and her character of Anita Campos in El sodero de mi vida. This is how she got to participate in productions such as Son amores she played the character of Lila and Los Roldán she played the character of María Roldán González. After a participation in Sos mi vida.

In 2008, she acted in Por amor a vos she played the character of María Concepción Molinari.

From 2009 and 2010, she played the character of Esperanza "Hope" Bauer in the Cris Morena youth series Casi Ángeles. She also participated in the theatrical season of the cycle in 2009.

In 2011, she returned to work at Pol-Ka to play the character of María Paula "Poly" Said in the series Los únicos. Also in that year she was called to participate in the contest of Bailando 2011. That same year she participated in the Carlos Baute music video Tu cuerpo bailando en mi cuerpo.

In 2012, she played the character of Rosa Montes in the series Sos mi hombre broadcast by the screen of Canal 13 and starring Luciano Castro and Celeste Cid.

From 2015 to 2016, she played the character of Gilda Albarracín in the series Esperanza mía.

In 2016, she played the character of Belén in the series Educando a Nina telecomedy broadcast by Telefe and starring Griselda Siciliani.

In 2017 she played the character of Florencia "Floro" Petrocelli in the series of Pol-Ka Quiero vivir a tu lado.

She participated in the contest of Bailando 2018.

=== Singing career ===
Jimena dabbled in music since she was a child, interpreting the odd subject in the different fictions in which she participated, but it is 28 May 2015, which debuts as the band's vocalist "Barón Band" .

In 2017 Jimena presents "La tonta", her first single as a solo singer and releases her debut album, with the same name. With the release of the album she presented "Qlo" the second single from the album.

In May 2019, this time, under the artistic name of J Mena, she released her new single "La cobra" that quickly went viral in his native country, making 2,000,000 reproductions, it fits emphasize that now it already has +51,000,000 views on YouTube and +20,000,000 streams on Spotify. After the great debut of "La cobra" J Mena released her second single for her new record work "Quién Empezó" with the biggest female exponent of Argentine trap Cazzu, this single had great acceptance by the public taking 2,100,000 views on YouTube and a #1 in music trends in Argentina. On 2 August, Jimena released her second album of the name of her first single, which includes eight songs of which, among them, she makes two collaborations with the cumbia group Ráfaga and the trap singer Cazzu. After her great success as a solo singer, J Mena signed with Sony Music Enterteiment that already has a new single titled "Taxi Voy" under the management of this record. In November 2019, J Mena won the MTV EMA award for Best Latin Artist.

In February 2020, she published "Puta", a new single that proposes to resignify the insult and talk about the freedom of women. This single caused controversy and was criticized for using a marketing campaign alluding to prostitution. As a result seh cancelled planned shows at Río Negro Apple Festival and at the Villa La Angostura National Gardens Festival, in Neuquén.

In March 2021, after more than a year away from music, she returned and published a new single entitled "Flor de involución", accompanied by a video clip.

In March 2023, she did a performance after 4 years of hiatus at the conclusion of stage play La Vendimia Para Todos.

== Personal life ==
She dated the Argentine footballer Daniel Osvaldo around 2013 to 2015 and they have a son together.

In 2018 Jimena Barón was in a relationship with Argentinian tennis player, Juan Martín del Potro.

From September 2020 to 2021, Jimena Barón was in a relationship with television presenter Luis "Tucu" López.

== Filmography ==
=== Television ===
Year	Title	Character	Channel
1991–1994	Grande, pa!!!	Micaela Leiva	Telefe
1998–1999	Gasoleros	Loli	Canal 13
2000	Calientes	Malena	Canal 13
2001	El sodero de mi vida	Ana "Anita" Campos	Canal 13
2002–2004	Son amores	Lila	Canal 13
2004–2005	Los Roldán	María Roldán González	Telefe
2006	Sos mi vida	María Victoria López	Canal 13
2008	Por amor a vos	María Concepción Molinari	Telefe
2009–2010	Casi Ángeles	Esperanza "Hope" Bauer	Telefe
2011	Los únicos	María Paula "Poly" Said	Canal 13
2012–2013	Sos mi hombre	Rosa "Maravillosa" Montes	Canal 13
2015–2016	Esperanza mía	Gilda Albarracín	Canal 13
2016	Educando a Nina	Belén	Telefe
2017	Quiero vivir a tu lado	Florencia "Floro" Petrocelli	Canal 13

=== Films ===
Year	Movie	Character	Director
1998	El Faro	Aneta	Eduardo Mignogna
2017	Hipersomnia	Dolores "Lola" Cipriota	Gabriel Grieco
2018	Rodrigo, fue lo mejor del amor	Marixa Balli	Lorena Muñoz

=== Television programs ===
Year	Program	Channel	Notes
2011	Bailando 2011	Canal 13	18th eliminated
2015	Bailando 2015	Canal 13	Replacing Lizy Tagliani
2016	Bailando 2016	Canal 13	Join María Del Cerro in the Cha Cha Cha with Celebrities
2016	Canta si puedes	Canal 13	Judge in replacement of Gimena Accardi
2017	Bailando 2017	Canal 13	Guest of Cecilia Bonelli in Salsa in Trio
2018	Especiales Musicales de Morfi	Telefe	Guest Host
2018	Bailando 2018	Canal 13	Runner-up
2018–2019	Por el mundo	Telefe	Guest Host
2019	Cortá por Lozano	Telefe	Host in replacement of Verónica Lozano
2021	Bailando 2021	Canal 13	Judge

=== Videoclips ===
Year	Artist	Song	Director
2011	Carlos Baute	Tu cuerpo bailando en mi cuerpo	

== Discography ==
=== Studio albums ===
List of studio albums with selected details and chart positions
Title	Studio album details	Peaks	Certifications
Title	Studio album details	ARG	Certifications
La Tonta	Released: 8 September 2017 (ARG); Label: Self-released; Formats: CD, digital download, streaming	19	
La Cobra	Released: 2 August 2019 (ARG); Label: Self-released; Formats: CD, digital download, streaming	3	CAPIF: Platinum
Mala Sangre	Released: 28 March 2023; Label: Sony Music Argentina; Formats: Digital download, streaming	—	
"—" denotes a recording that did not chart or was not released in that territory.

=== Singles ===
==== As lead artist ====
List of singles showing year released and album name
Title	Year	Peaks			Certifications	Album
Title	Year	ARG	ARG National	URU	Certifications	Album
"La Tonta"	2017	—	6	—		La Tonta
"QLO"	2017	—	—	—		La Tonta
"Que Regreses Tú"	2018	—	—	—		Non-album singles
"Atrás del Sol"	2018	—	—	—		Non-album singles
"Me Falta el Sol" (featuring Carlos Ares)	2018	100	—	—		Non-album singles
"La Cobra"	2019	3	3	8	CAPIF: Platinum	La Cobra
"Quien Empezó" (featuring Cazzu)	2019	51	6	—		La Cobra
"Se Acabó"	2019	42	—	—		La Cobra
"Dos Corazones"	2019	69	—	—		La Cobra
"Ya Quisieran"	2019	—	—	—		Non-album singles
"Taxi Voy"	2019	—	—	—		Non-album singles
"Puta"	2020	81	—	—		Non-album singles
"Flor de Involución"	2021	—	20	—		Non-album singles
"Ya No Te Extraño"	2021	95	—	—		Non-album singles
"Corazón de Cemento (featuring Chili Fernandez)	2021	—	—	—		Non-album singles
"La Araña"	2022	—	—	—		Mala Sangre
"Mi Felicidad"	2022	—	—	—		Mala Sangre
"Cruel y Despiadado"	2022	—	—	—		Mala Sangre
"Los Locos"	2023	—	—	—		Mala Sangre
"Elegante" (with Los Palmeras)	2024	—	—	—		Non-album singles
"El amor de mi vida" (with Ulises Bueno)	2024	—	—	—		Non-album singles
"—" denotes a recording that did not chart or was not released in that territory.

==== As a featured artist ====
List of singles showing year released and album name
Title	Year	Album
"Se Quema" (with Miss Bolivia)	2019	Non-album singles
"Sale Volando" (with Nico Cotton and Bhavi)	2019	Non-album singles
"Para Nosotros" (with Romeo El Santo)	2019	Non-album singles
"Sinvergüenza" (with Emanero and Karina featuring Ángela Torres)	2023	Non-album singles
"Noche de Estrellas" (with Rafaga)	2024	Non-album singles
"Como si no nos amáramos" (with Migrantes, Emanero and Nico Valdi)	2024	Non-album singles

=== Promotional singles ===
Title	Year	Album
"No Te Siento"	2016	La Tonta
"La Tormenta"	2016	La Tonta
"Bailando"	2018	Non-album singles

== Awards and nominations ==
Year	Award	Category	For	Result
1998	Martín Fierro Awards	Best Child Actress	Gasoleros	Won
1998	Argentine Film Critics Association Awards	Best New Actress	El Faro	Won
2018	Gardel Awards	Best New Pop Artist Album	La Tonta	Won
2019	MTV Europe Music Award	Best Latin America South Act	Jimena Barón	Won
