= Fabio Di Tomaso =

Canadian-Argentine actor (born 1977)

- Born: April 9, 1977 (age 49); Quebec, Montreal, Canada
- Occupation: Actor
- Years active: 1997–present
- Height: 1.72 m (5 ft 7 1/2 in)
- Partner: Melina Petriella (2004-2012)

Fabio Di Tomaso (born April 9, 1977, in Quebec, Montreal, Canada) is a Canadian actor.

== Biography ==
Fabio Di Tomaso was born into a family of Argentine and Italian origin. He spent his childhood and adolescence in the town of Boulogne Sur Mer next to his mother. At 16 he expressed his interest in musical bands and decided to venture into the world of music. Later, he studied theater and had several jobs. He did the CBC on economics but a month later he confessed to a friend that he wanted to do theater.

== Personal life ==
From 2004 to 2012, Fabio Di Tomaso was in a relationship with the actress, Melina Petriella. In 2016, Fabio Di Tomaso meet Samira Sufan, film producer. In 2017, they get married. In January 2018 the couple's first child, a boy, was born whom, they called Fidel Di Tomaso. The couple divorced in 2019 after almost two years of marriage. They both share custody of their son.

== Career ==
=== Acting career ===
Fabio Di Tomaso began his career in the movie Bajo bandera in 1997. In 2001, he was part of the cast of the television series Yago, pasión morena. In 2003, he was part of the cast of the television series Resistiré. In 2004, he was part of the cast of the television series Padre Coraje. From 2005, he was the protagonist of the youth television series Floricienta with Florencia Bertotti, Isabel Macedo and Benjamín Rojas. In 2006, he was part of the cast of the television series Juanita, la soltera. In 2008, he was part of the cast of the television series Vidas robadas. In 2009, he was part of the cast of the movie Cartas para Jenny. In 2010, he was part of the cast of the youth television series Consentidos. In 2010, he was part of the cast the movie Plumíferos. In 2012, he was part of the cast of the miniseries Volver a nacer. From 2012 to 2013, he was part of the cast of the television series Dulce Amor. In 2014, he was part of the cast of the television series Somos familia. In 2014, he was part of the cast of the television series Camino al Amor. In 2015, he was part of the cast of the miniseries El mal menor. In 2017, he was part of the cast of the television series Cuéntame cómo pasó. In 2017, he was part of the cast of the movie Soldado argentino solo conocido por Dios. In 2019, he makes a special participation in Pequeña Victoria. In 2020, he was part of the cast of the television series Separadas.

=== Musical career ===
Fabio Di Tomaso was part of the musical band "Poketers" beside Sebastián Rubio, Santiago Prado and Luciano Iriarte.

== Filmography ==
=== Movies ===
Year	Movie	Character	Director
1997	Bajo bandera	Soldier	Juan José Jusid
2009	Cartas para Jenny	Eitan	Diego Musiak
2010	Plumíferos	Tero	Daniel De Felippo and Gustavo A. Giannini
2010	Malvo	Malvo	
2017	Soldado argentino solo conocido por Dios	Second Lieutenant Quiroga	Rodrigo Fernández Engler

=== Television ===
Year	Title	Character	Channel
2001	Yago, pasión morena		Telefe
2003	Resistiré	Javier	Telefe
2004	Padre Coraje	Lautaro Teodoro Costa	Canal 13
2004–2005	Floricienta	Máximo Augusto Calderón de la Hoya, Conde de Kricoragán	Canal 13
2006	Juanita, la soltera	Renzo	Canal 13
2008	Vidas robadas	Octavio Amaya	Telefe
2010	Consentidos	Felipe de La Fuente	Canal 13
2012	Volver a nacer	Leonardo Hackerman	TV Pública
2012–2013	Dulce Amor	Leonardo Espósito	Telefe
2013	Historias de corazón	Felipe	Telefe
2014	Somos familia	Germán Colombo	Telefe
2014	Camino al Amor	Bautista	Telefe
2015	El mal menor	Raúl	TV Pública
2017	Cuéntame cómo pasó	Armando	TV Pública
2019	Otros pecados	Rafael	Canal 13
2019	Pequeña Victoria	José	Telefe
2020	Separadas	Matias Santamaría	Canal 13

== Discography ==
=== Soundtrack albums ===
- 2005 — Floricienta
