= Alejo García Pintos =

Argentine actor

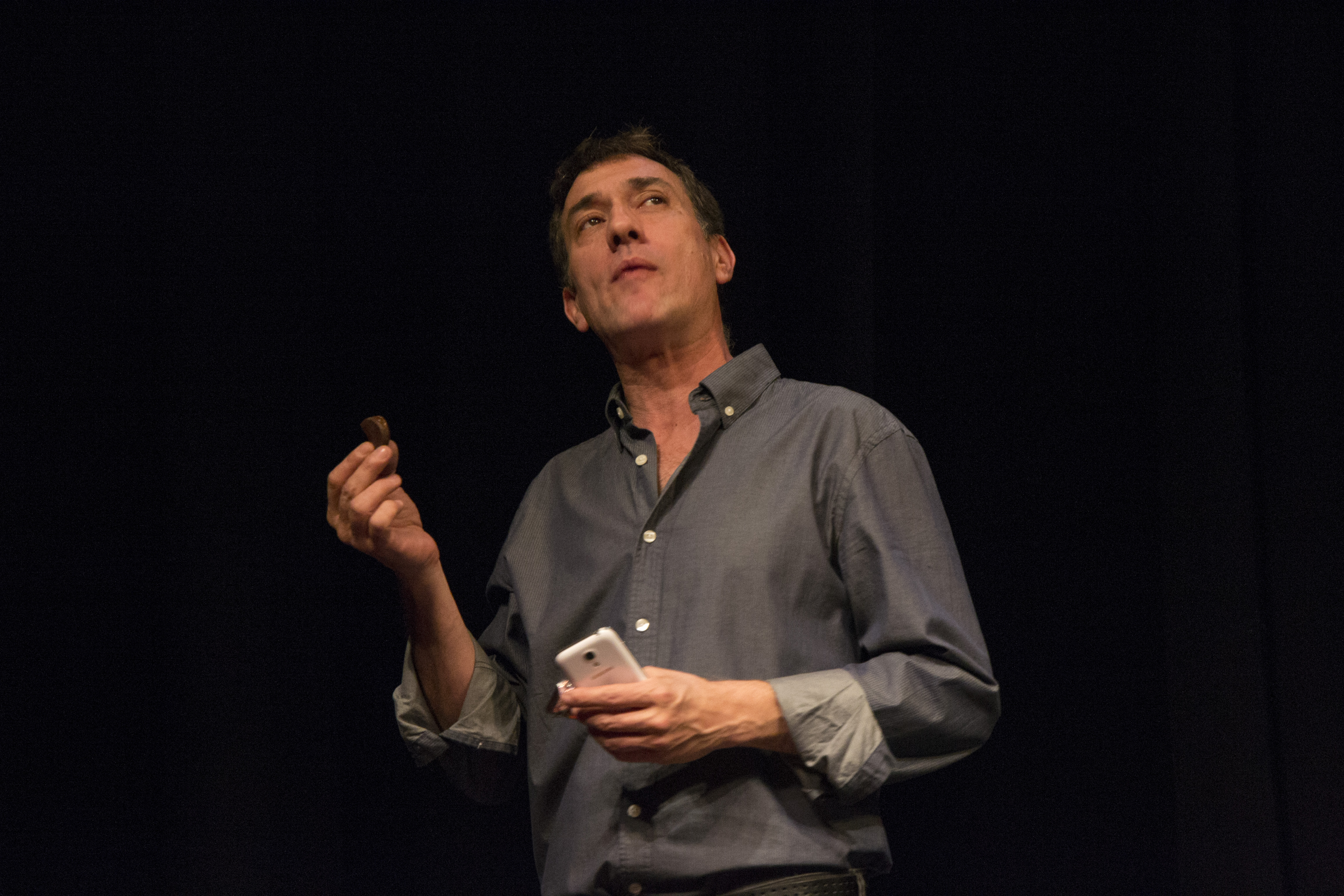
- García Pintos in 2014
- Born: February 4, 1967 (age 59); La Plata, Argentina
- Occupation: Actor
- Years active: 1986–present
- Children: 2

Alejo García Pintos (born February 4, 1967) is an Argentine actor.

== Filmography ==
=== Movies ===
| Year | Movie | Character | Director |
|---|---|---|---|
| 1986 | Night of the Pencils | Pablo Díaz | Héctor Olivera |
| 1987 | Made in Argentina | Ariel | Juan José Jusid |
| 1993 | Fuego gris | The Boss | Pablo César |
| 1997 | Ashes of Paradise | Yeti | Marcelo Piñeyro |
| 2001 | Campo de sangre | Pablo | Gabriel Arbós |
| 2003 | Vivir intentando | Roberto | Tomás Yankelevich |
| 2003 | Potestad | Man on the Subway | Luis César D'Angiolillo |
| 2003 | Los esclavos felices | Carlos Peralta | Gabriel Arbós |
| 2016 | No me mates | Javier Weber | Gabriel Arbós |
| 2022 | Argentina, 1985 | Trial Judge | Santiago Mitre |

=== Theater ===
| Year | Title | Character |
|---|---|---|
| 1987 | Sabato, Domenica e Lunedi | Atilio |
| 1988 | Saverio el cruel | Juan |
| 1989 | Invisibles | Totolo |
| 1990 | ¿Qué no? | |
| 1991 | Los '90 son nuestros | Rafa |
| 1992 | Memorias del infierno | Ulises |
| 2001 | A propósito de la duda | |
| 2002 | Sueño con sirenas | Rolando |
| 2003–2004 | Rincón de Luz | Lito Ramos |
| 2004 | Chúmbale | Enzo |
| 2005 | Floricienta | Evaristo |
| 2006 | Chiquititas Sin Fin | Pierre Demont |
| 2007 | Casi Ángeles | Bartolomé Bedoya Agüero |
| 2008 | La curva de la felicidad | Emanuel |
| 2009 | Rodolfo Walsh & Carlos Gardel | Rodolfo Walsh |
| 2010 | Sin vergüenzas | Alejo |
| 2011 | Extraños en un tren | Tony |
| 2013 | Víctor o los niños al poder | Carlos |
| 2014 | Nuestro fin de semana | Carlos |
| 2014 | La decisión de Yanina | Gustavo |
| 2015 | Historias de diván | Antonio |
| 2018 | El lado B del amor | Psychoanalyst |
| 2018 | #LauraSosHermosa | Jorge |
| 2019 | ¿Qué tenés en la cabeza? | Neuroscientist |

=== Television ===
| Year | Title | Character | Channel |
|---|---|---|---|
| 1987 | Tiempo cumplido | Rulo | TV Pública |
| 1989 | Tanguito | Tanguito | TV Pública |
| 1989 | Las Comedias de Darío Vittori | Gustavo | Canal 13 / América TV |
| 1989 | Las Comedias de Darío Vittori | Javier | Canal 13 / América TV |
| 1991 | El gordo y el flaco | Dr. Alejo Pintor | Telefe |
| 1992 | La Banda del Golden Rocket | Alejo | Canal 13 |
| 1993 | ¡Grande, pa! | | Telefe |
| 1994 | Quereme | Matías | Telefe |
| 1994 | Nano | Máximo Espada del Molino López | Canal 13 |
| 1994 | Nueve lunas | Abelardo | Canal 13 |
| 1995 | Poliladron (1997) | Agustín | Canal 13 |
| 1996 | De poeta y de loco | Student | Canal 13 |
| 1997 | De corazón | | Canal 13 |
| 1997 | Mía solo mía | Boni | Telefe |
| 1998 | Gasoleros | Álvaro "Alvarito" | Canal 13 |
| 1998 | Chiquititas | Doctor | Telefe |
| 1998-1999 | Como vos & yo | Cristian | Canal 13 |
| 2001 | Provócame | Esteban Molina | Telefe |
| 2002 | Kachorra | Roberto Trípoli | Telefe |
| 2003 | Rincón de Luz | Lito Ramos | Canal 9 / América TV |
| 2005 | Floricienta | Evaristo | Canal 13 |
| 2006 | Chiquititas Sin Fin | Pierre Demont | Telefe |
| 2007-2008 | Casi Ángeles | Bartolomé Bedoya Agüero | Telefe |
| 2009 | Valientes | Diego | Canal 13 |
| 2010 | Casi Ángeles | Bartolomé Bedoya Agüero | Telefe |
| 2010 | Jake & Blake | | Disney Channel |
| 2010 | Sueña conmigo | Archaeologist Martín Rosales | Nickelodeon |
| 2011 | Herederos de una venganza | Dionisio Mestre | Canal 13 |
| 2011 | Historias de la primera vez | Nicolás | América TV |
| 2012 | El hombre de tu vida | Pedro | Telefe |
| 2012 | Volver a nacer | Diego Hackerman | TV Pública |
| 2012 | La Dueña | Horacio Marmurek | Telefe |
| 2012 | La viuda de Rafael | Tomás "Tom" Pérez Echegaray | TV Pública |
| 2013 | Historias de corazón | Juan | Telefe |
| 2013 | Esa mujer | Juanjo | TV Pública |
| 2015 | 4 reinas | Mario | TV Pública |
| 2016 | Jungle Nest | | Disney XD |
| 2017 | Cuéntame cómo pasó | Néstor | TV Pública |
| 2019 | La suerte de Loli | | |
| 2020 | Los internacionales | Lawyer Manzur | Telefe |
