= Gimena Accardi =

Argentine actress (born 1985)

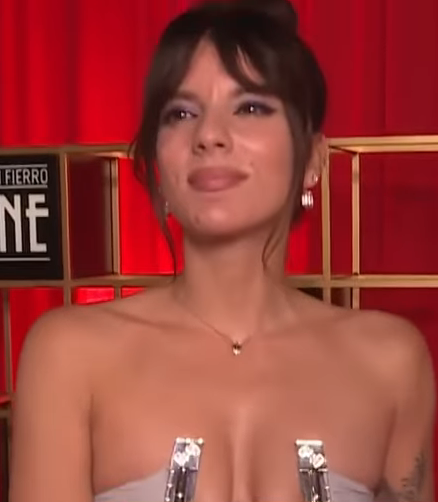
- Gimena Accardi at the Cine Martín Fierro Awards in 2025
- Born: María Gimena de los Milagros Accardi; May 27, 1985 (age 41); Buenos Aires, Argentina
- Occupation: Actress
- Years active: 2000–present
- Spouse: Nicolás Vázquez (2016–2025)

María Gimena de los Milagros Accardi (born 27 May 1985), better known as Gimena Accardi, is an Argentine actress.

== Biography ==
María Gimena de los Milagros Accardi was born on May 27, 1985, in Buenos Aires, Federal District, Argentina.

== Career ==
At age 10, Accardi began studying theater with teachers Stella Maris Closas, Patricia Palmer, and Raúl Serrano. She was cast in a television pilot, Cosa de chicos from producer Quique Estevanez, which never made it to air. However, Estevanez then cast her as Jessica, the sister of "Beto" Santana in Los buscas de siempre from Azul Televisión. Next, she was cast as Sofía, a teenager struggling with drug addiction, on PH by Azul Televisión.

In 2002, she played Catalina in Maridos a domicilio by Azul Televisión. This program was only on the air a short time, after which Accardi was cast as Melina in Los simuladores and Josefina in Kachorra, both by Telefe, as well as playing Sabrina on the second season of Rebelde Way by América TV.

In 2003, film director Teresa Constantini cast Accardi as Lucila in the unitary program Ensayo: Habitación 306. A year later, in 2004, she played Jazmín in the comedy Panadería los Felipe by Telefe. In February 2005, when she was about to begin the second season of Panadería los Felipe, she was cast as Tatiana in the soap opera Amor en Custodia by Telefe. After finishing this program in 2006, she was cast in a feature film which was postponed due to lack of funding. The film, Cartas para Jenny, was eventually shot in 2007 in San Luis Province and then in Israel.

That same year, Accardi played Malvina, one of the villains of Casi Ángeles by Telefe. In 2009, she played the antagonist in the film Papá por un día with Nicolás Cabré and Luisana Lopilato. Then, in 2011, Accardi became part of one of the most successful telenovelas of that year, Herederos de una venganza, in which she played China Villegas. In 2012, she played Dolores in the second season of Los únicos, following that role up with another antagonist in the telenovela of Pol-ka, Sos mi hombre.

In 2013 she joined the cast of Solamente vos In 2015 she got a lead role in Milagros en campaña and also participated in Conflictos modernos. In 2016, Accardi starred in the musical El otro lado de la cama and served as a judge on Canta si puedes. In 2018, she was cast as Lara and Patricia in Mi hermano es un clon.

== Personal life ==
Accardi started a relationship with actor Nicolás Vázquez in 2007. They were married on December 7, 2016, in a beach wedding at Mar del Plata, and divorced in 2025.

Accardi and Vázquez survived the Champlain Towers South collapse on June 24, 2021. They were in Miami for work and to meet with Argentine comedian Martín Bossi, returning to their condo just as it began to experience the collapse. Accardi suffered a blow to the head when she ran into a palm tree during the mass exodus from the building, but both she and Vázquez were otherwise unharmed.

== Filmography ==
=== Television ===
Year	Title	Character	Channel
2000–2001	Los buscas de siempre	Jesica Santana	Azul Televisión
2001	PH	Sofía	Azul Televisión
2002	Maridos a domicilio	Catalina	Azul Televisión
2002	Kachorra	Josefina Moravia	Telefe
2002	Los simuladores	Melina Fichelson	Telefe
2003	Rebelde Way	Sabrina Guzmán	América TV
2004–2005	Panadería "Los Felipe"	Jazmín Miñon	Telefe
2005	Amor en custodia	Tatiana Aguirre	Telefe
2006	Alma Pirata	Bernarda "Bernardita" de Marco	Telefe
2007–2010	Casi Ángeles	Malvina Bedoya Agüero	Telefe
2011	Herederos de una venganza	Emilia "China" Villegas	Canal 13
2012	Los únicos	Dolores Fuentes	Canal 13
2012–2013	Sos mi hombre	Brenda Garay	Canal 13
2013	Una vida posible	Carla	Canal 13
2013–2014	Solamente vos	Candela	Canal 13
2014	Milagros en campaña	Silvia	Canal 9
2015	Conflictos modernos	Claudia Suárez	Canal 9
2018	Rizhoma Hotel	Florencia Balaguer	Telefe
2018–2019	Mi hermano es un clon	Lara Alcorta/Patricia López	Canal 13
2020	Separadas	Carolina Fernández	Canal 13

=== Movies ===
Year	Movie	Character	Director
2007	Cartas para Jenny	Jennifer	
2009	Papá por un día	Cecilia Ayerza	Raúl Rodríguez Peila
2017	Me casé con un boludo	Herself	Juan Taratuto
2018	Re loca	Sofía	Martino Zaidelis
2019	Anoche	Pilar	

=== Theater ===
Year	Title	Character	Notes
2007	Casi Ángeles	Malvina Bedoya Agüero	
2011	Los únicos	Rosario/María	Replacement of Eugenia Tobal and Griselda Siciliani
2014	Dos pícaros sinvergüenzas	Charlotte Skip	
2016–2017	El otro lado de la cama	Sonia	
2020	Jauría		

=== Videoclips ===
Year	Artist	Song
2014	Axel	Afinidad

=== Television programs ===
Year	Program	Channel	Notes
2016	Canta si puedes	Canal 13	Judge
2016-2017	Como anillo al dedo	Canal 13	Host
2019	Bailando 2019	Canal 13	Special participation in the Trio Salsa with Florencia Vigna and Facundo Mazzei

== Awards and nominations ==
Year	Award	Category	Work	Result
2017	Estrella de Mar Award	Female Comedy Musical Lead Acting	El otro lado de la cama	Nominated
2019	Martín Fierro Awards	Protagonic Female Performance	Mi hermano es un clon	Nominated

== Discography ==
- 2007 — Casi Ángeles
