= Los únicos =

Argentine television series

- Genre: Superhero drama
- Created by: Adrián Suar
- Written by: Pablo Junovich; Cecilia Guerty; Mariano Vera; Marcos Villalón
- Directed by: Rodolfo Antúnez; Sebastián Pivotto
- Creative director: Liza Gieco
- Starring: Mariano Martínez; Nicolás Cabré; Griselda Siciliani; Nicolás Vázquez; Claudia Fontán; Jimena Barón; Arnaldo André; Brenda Asnicar; María Eugenia Suárez; Marco Antonio Caponi; Rodrigo Noya; Elías Viñoles; Gimena Accardi; Darío Lopilato; Emilia Attías; Eugenia Tobal; José María Monje; Marcelo Mazzarello; Victorio D'Alessandro; Christian Sancho; Juan Manuel Guilera
- Opening theme: Los Únicos; Octavio Stampalia
- Country of origin: Argentina
- Original language: Spanish
- No. of seasons: 2
- No. of episodes: 243

Production
- Executive producer: Adrián Suar
- Running time: 60 minutes
- Production company: Pol-ka

Original release
- Network: El Trece
- Release: February 7, 2011 – May 11, 2012

Related
- Alguien que me quiera; Solamente Vos; Sin Código

Los únicos (Spanish: "The uniques") is a 2011 Argentine superhero television series aired by El Trece in at prime time. The "uniques" are a superhero team working as a covert operation unit. Main actors are Arnaldo André, Mariano Martínez and Griselda Siciliani, the two main supervillains are played by Favio Posca and Carlos Belloso.

== Premise ==
Unlike most productions by Pol-ka, Los únicos is not a telenovela featuring common people or a vengeance plot. Instead, it is a crime fiction comedy with metafictional elements. As such, it avoids the usual constrains of the plots of the aforementioned genres. The plot is influenced by the X-Men film series, Heroes and Sky High.

Nicolás Cabré makes a spin-off of the Sin Código telenovela, playing again his former character of "Axel Etcheverry". In the new plot, the "Nielsen Security" group has gone bankrupt, and Axel blames his former teammate Gabriel Nielsen for it. Nielsen (which was played by Adrián Suar, creator of both series) has appeared a number of times, as well as other characters and references to the former telenovela.

Arnaldo André composed his character, an experimented leader managing a team, based over his own protective relations with relatives, and the ways TV producers try to motivate him to accept a work. He made a deliberate effort to avoid giving an authoritarian style to the character, to avoid comparisons with his former character at Valientes.

== Production ==
The series has had cameos from notable Argentine actors, such as Esteban Prol, Eugenia Suárez, Carlos Baute and Anabela Ascar. Gonzalo Heredia, from the previous successful telenovela Malparida, played himself in a casual scene, with a brief cameo of Juana Viale, also from that telenovela. Osvaldo Laport will play again his former character of "Amador Heredia" from Soy Gitano. Miguel Ángel Rodríguez and Martín Bossi will play crime bosses, and Ana María Orozco will join the team. A fashion show will include the presence of Pía Slapka, acting as herself, and fashion designer Roberto Giordano.

The series had a successful rating, with nearly 20 points.

== Plot ==
The "Uniques" are actually one of several covert operation units of skilled or superpowered people working at different countries. Alfredo Monterrey organized many of those units, and the series is about the creation and organization of the Argentine branch.

=== First season (2011) ===
In this instance, the Únicos are recruited by the philanthropist Alfredo Monterrey (Arnaldo André), who dedicates his life to the formation and implementation of these teams in different parts of the planet and is also in charge of operations. His current mission is to complete the formation of the Argentine team, whose physical residence is a mystery. To this end, he will summon 'the best', with the help of his loyal assistant Soraya (Claudia Fontán). Together, they will form a unique squad that must face not only those who attempt to destabilize the system - like the villain 'Livio Muzak' (Carlos Belloso), Monterrey's number one enemy, and 'Ronco Milevich' (Favio Posca), another violent and ruthless criminal - but also the shifts in the group's relationships, the friendly ones and those that approach romanticism, even knowing that, according to integration protocols, they cannot engage in emotional relationships.

=== Second season (2012) ===
Axel wakes up in heaven where he tries to come back to life by going through a door with bars. There he has an encounter with God (Enrique Pinti), who tells him that he will be sent back to life, with a new gift, as punishment for mistakes made in his life. The agents will not be able to prevent the bomb from detonating, although they will manage to protect themselves. However, the device was not a common explosive, but contained a chemical that would kill them. As they managed to escape in time, the chemical hardly affected them. It did not end with their lives, but nevertheless they will quickly begin to notice certain changes. The particular toxic of the bomb, far from killing them, made them stronger: now their gifts will mutate, and they will reach new abilities. For his part, Dreyfus (Fabián Gianola) will form the "Anti-Únicos" brigade to advance with his evil plans.

== Cast ==
Portrayed by	Character	Gifts	Appearances	
Portrayed by	Character	Gifts	Season 1	Season 2
Mariano Martínez	Diego Rouvier	Intelligence	Main	
Nicolás Cabré	Axel Etcheverry	Unbreakable & hypersensitivity	Main	Main
Griselda Siciliani	María Soledad Marini	Strength	Main	
Nicolás Vázquez	Rúben Hagi	Impenetrable & through objects	Main	Main
Eugenia Tobal	Rosario Ahumada	Scammer	Main	
Claudia Fontán	Soraya Bismarck		Main	Main
José María Monje	Hugo Albarracín	Elite Soldier	Main	
Marcelo Mazzarello	Adolfo Fortuna		Main	Main
Arnaldo André	Alfredo Monterrey	Strength	Main	
Jimena Barón	María Paula "Poly" Said	Hacker	Main	
Benda Asnicar	Keira Beltran	Bionic ears and telepathy	Main	Main
María Eugenia Suárez	Sofía Reyes	Magnet and bionic skills	Main	Main
Emilia Attias	Mía Horgensen	Pyrokinesis		Main
Marco Antonio Caponi	Moro Hunter	Nullify and absorb the gifts		Main
Christian Sancho	Ramón	Android	Recurring	Main
Rodrigo Noya	Bruno Epstein	Intelligence & Wireless Hacker	Recurring	Main
Dario Lopilato	Francisco "Pancho" Dreyfus			Main
Gimena Accardi	Dolores Fuertes			Main
Victorio D'Alessandro	Ciro Funes	Unbreakable, impenetrable & invisibility	Recurring	Main
Julieta Zylberberg	Helena Epstein	Clone	Also Starring	
Pilar Gamboa	Violeta Morano	Visions	Also Starring	

In production

- Marina Bellati as Melania
- Leo Kreimer as "Zurdo"
- Ana María Castel as Elvira (season 1)
- Fabián Arenillas as Manuel Soria
- Carlos Belloso as Livio Muzak † (season 1)
- Favio Posca as Ronco Milevich
- Fabián Gianola as Dreyfus
- Martín Bossi as Patrón Carranza
- Tomás Fonzi as Joaquín Ferragut † (season 1)
- Daniel Hendler as Wilson Castro † (season 1)
- Emilio Disi as Américo (season 1)
