= Nicolás Vázquez =

Argentine actor, comedian, television presenter and singer

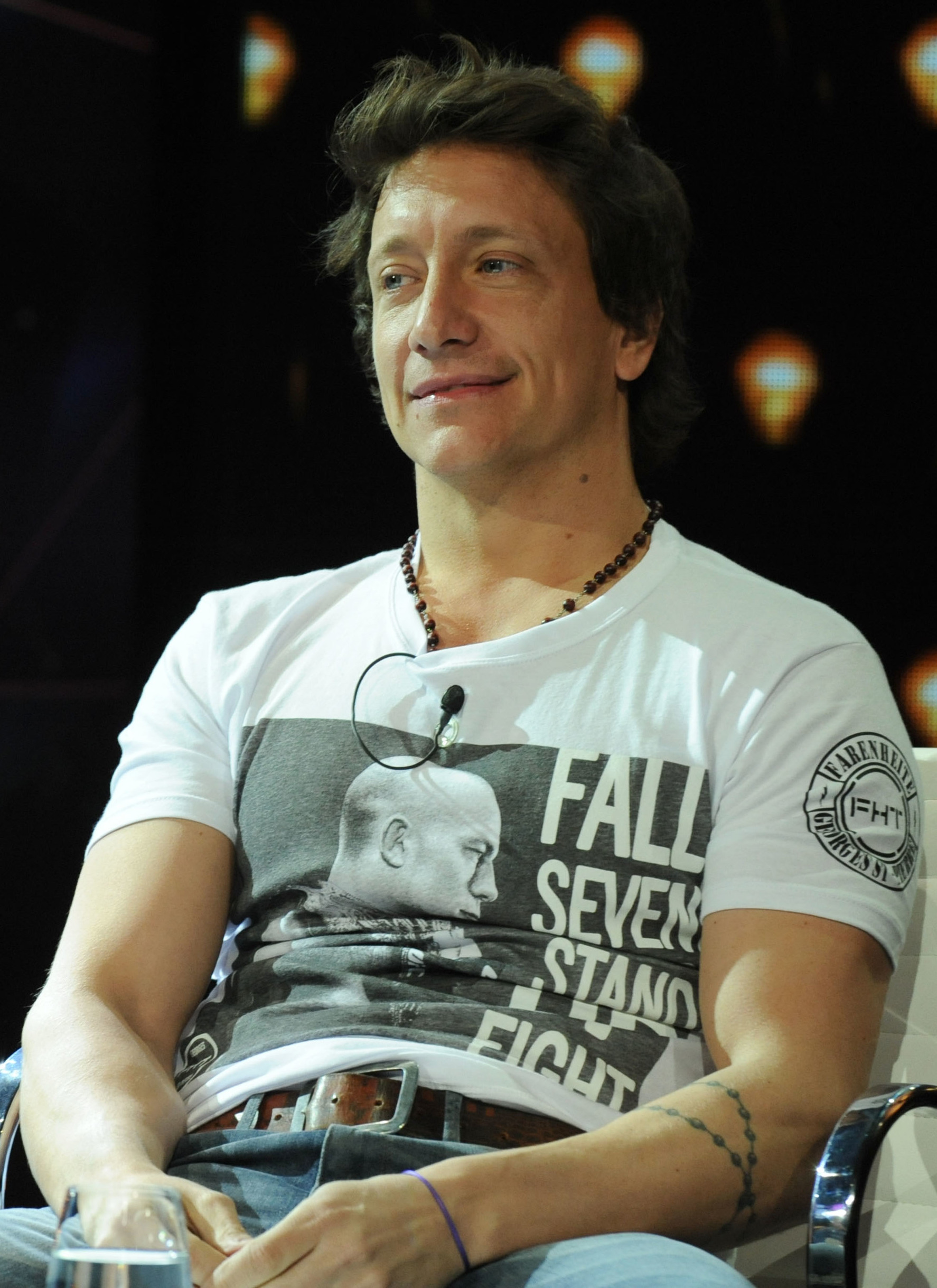
- Vázquez in 2014
- Born: Nicolás Diego Vázquez Mantovani; 12 June 1977 (age 48); Buenos Aires, Argentina
- Occupations: Actor, singer
- Years active: 1997–present
- Spouses: Mercedes Funes (m. 2006–2007) Gimena Accardi (m. 2016–2025)

Nicolás Diego Vázquez Mantovani (Spanish pronunciation: [nikoˈlas ˈβaskes]; 12 June 1977) is an Argentine television, theater and film actor, comedian, television presenter and singer.

== Career ==
Born in Olivos, Buenos Aires, Vázquez began his acting career in RRDT interpreting Ismael Bertuccio in 1997. In the same year, he participated in the film Verano del 98. Among other fictions, he was seen in Trillizos, said the midwife and Son amores, fiction where he achieved great fame and recognition. In 2004 he starred in Los pensionados, partnering in fiction with Luisana Lopilato, and the following year he won his first leading role in Who is the boss? with the character of "Enzo Michelli", together with Gianella Neyra. In 2005 he debuted in film with the film The Good Destiny, where he played the character of Willy. Then in 2006 is the voice of Lightning McQueen, in the movie Cars and in 2009 makes an appearance in Dad for a day, starring Luisana Lopilato, Nicolás Cabré and Gimena Accardi. In 2006, he was summoned by Cris Morena, to star, replacing Mariano Martínez, the Alma Pirata strip, as Andrés de Marco, and sharing the leading role with Luisana Lopilato, Benjamín Rojas, Elsa Pinilla, Fabián Mazzei, and Isabel Macedo. In the years 2007 and 2008 he stars with Emilia Attias, the juvenile strip Casi ángeles, where he plays the archaeologist "Nicolás Bauer" . He was part of the repertoire that contained the discs of the strip and the theatrical version of it. In spite of the great success of the fiction, he decided to leave the strip for an absolutely professional reason, since for three years he had been participating in the products of Cris Morena, Pirate Soul and the two seasons of Casi ángeles. In his place was Mariano Torre, in the third season of the program. During his time in the theater, Nicolás is known for his unipersonal, as Mutando, he was also in the musicals of Casi ángeles in the theater, and in the summer of 2009 / 2010 starred in the play Rumors, along with Carlín Calvo and Reina Reech, for which he was honored with a 'Estrella de mar' for best male performance of the cast. In 2010, he was invited to Showmatch by Marcelo Tinelli to perform with him Al límite, in the premiere of his first program. She stars in the play Sinvergüenzas. In November 2010, together with Emilia Attias, she returns to finish the juvenile strip Casi ángeles. In 2011 he was summoned by Pol-ka to star along with Mariano Martínez, Griselda Siciliani and Nicolás Cabré the Los Únicos strip, playing "Rubén Hagi". He also made the theatrical work of Los única, sharing the stage with Jimena Barón, who is your partner in the program, and a large part of the cast of the strip. This same year he was called to lead the first installment of the Kids Choice Awards in Argentina. In 2012 he starred with Nicolás Cabré and Emilia Attias the second season of Los Únicos, again playing Rúben, 7 a sentimental back guard who gave his life for others by showing his feelings openly At the end of 2012 begins to shoot in San Luis the film Por un handful of hairs, where he is the main character with Carlos Valderrama and Rubén Rada. In 2013 he makes a special participation in Only You. There she personifies Facundo, Aurora's ex-boyfriend (Natalia Oreiro), and competes for her love with Juan (Adrián Suar). In addition, he is supposed to return to the theater with the play At the end of the rainbow, which will star alongside Karina K. At the end of 2013 and in 2014, Nicolás is one of the male protagonists of the strip My friends always with the character of Manuel, where he returns to share the cast with Emilia Attias after Casi ángeles and Los Únicos. In theater he starred in Estravaganza Tango and in the comedy film Por un handful of hairs. In 2015 he debuted as a conductor of Como anillo al dedo, on the screen of El Threce and premiered the film "Kryptonita". During 2016 he was the protagonist along with Benjamín Rojas, Gimena Accardi and Sofía Pachano, from the Argentine version of the Spanish work The other side of the bed. In addition, in movies the protagonist the film La última fiesta.

== Personal life ==
After seven years of relationship, on 22 April 2006, Vázquez married actress Mercedes Funes in the church of Nuestra Señora del Guadalupe. On 15 August 2007, the couple divorced. He married his partner of nine years, Gimena Accardi, in 2016; they divorced in 2025.

Vázquez and Accardi survived the Champlain Towers South collapse on June 24, 2021.

== Filmography ==
Film
Year	Film	Role	Notes
2005	El buen destino	Nicolás	
2006	Cars	Rayo McQueen	Voice
Television
Year	Title	Role	Notes
1997–2003	5 Amigos	Mariano Marco Arce	First Role
1998	Verano del '98	Lisandro	
1998	Como vos & yo	Uncredited	
1999	Trillizos, ¡dijo la partera!	Pato	
2000	Calientes	Martín	
2000	Ilusiones (compartidas)	Marcelo	
2002	Son Amores	Pato	
2004	Los Pensionados	Manuel Morán	
2005	¿Quién es el Jefe?	Enzo Michelli	Main Role
2005	La noche del 10	Himself	Guest Appearance
2006	Alma Pirata	Andrés DeMarco	Main Role
2007–2008	Casi Ángeles	Nicolás Bauer	Nominated — Martín Fierro Award for Best Leading Actor in a Comedy
2011–2012	Los unicos	Ruben Hagi	
2013–2014	Mis amigos de siempre	Manuel	
Theatre
Year	Title	Role	Notes
2007	Alma Pirata	Andrés DeMarco	Theatre version of Alma Pirata

== Awards and nominations ==
- Martín Fierro Awards
  - 2008: Best Leading Actor in a Comedy (Casi Ángeles) — Nominated
