= Unicenter (shopping) =

Shopping mall in Argentina

Coordinates: 34°30′31″S 58°31′26″W

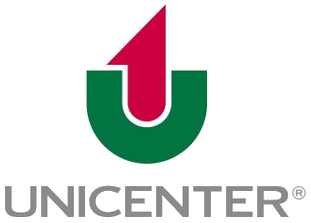
Logo

Unicenter is a major shopping and entertainment complex in Greater Buenos Aires, Argentina. It is located by the Panamerican Highway in Martínez, 17 mi (25 km) northwest of downtown Buenos Aires. It is just north of the Panamerican, on Calle Paraná.

Unicenter was opened in 1988, the first shopping centre of its size in Argentina. It has 300 stores, largely branches of national and international chains that include: Ralph Lauren, Tommy Hilfiger, Christian Dior, Christian Lacroix, Zara, Yves Saint Laurent, Swarovski, Armani Exchange, Levi's, Nike, Adidas, Calvin Klein, as well as a major supermarket (Jumbo), a department store (Falabella), a 14-screen cinema with one of the most advanced sound systems in South America (operated by Hoyts), and a food court.

Facing Unicenter across the Panamerican is Norcenter Lifestyle Mall (Norcenter), a cinema, shopping and entertainment complex, which boasts the only Imax center in Argentina.
