= Claudia Lapacó =

Argentine actress

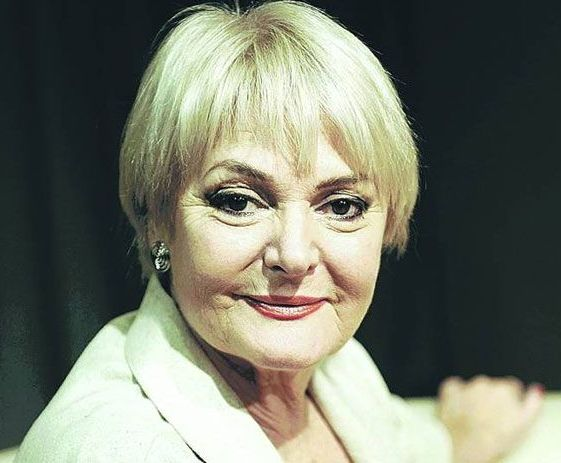
Claudia Lapacó

Claudia Lapacó (born June 25, 1940) is an Argentine actress with her accomplishments beginning about 1960 spanning until as recently as 2017.

== Career ==
Lapacó was one of the stars in the 1975 Olinda Bozán film No ser débil con la vida.

== Awards ==
=== Nominations ===
- 2013 Martín Fierro Awards
  - Best actress of miniseries
