= Alma Pirata =

Argentine telenovela

- Also known as: Alma Pirata: Una nueva aventura está por comenzar
- Genre: Telenovela
- Created by: Gabriela Fiore, Leando Calderone
- Written by: Cris Morena
- Directed by: Cris Morena; Martín Mariani
- Starring: Benjamín Rojas; Fabián Mazzei; Luisana Lopilato; Mariano Martínez; Nicolás Vázquez; Isabel Macedo; Elsa Pinilla; Julia Calvo
- Opening theme: "I Need Your Love" (Willie Lorenzo and Cris Morena)
- Country of origin: Argentina
- Original language: Spanish
- No. of episodes: 138

Production
- Producer: Cris Morena
- Cinematography: various

Original release
- Network: Telefe
- Release: 2006

Alma Pirata is an Argentine 2006 telenovela, created and produced by Cris Morena. In this telenovela, lead roles were portrayed by Benjamín Rojas, Fabián Mazzei, Luisana Lopilato, Mariano Martínez, Nicolás Vázquez, Isabel Macedo, Elsa Pinilla and Julia Calvo.

This show earned 2006 Martín Fierro Award for the best comedy for youngs. Main cast also recorded Alma Pirata soundtrack, mostly Benjamín Rojas. During this show, Luisana Lopilato and Mariano Martinez were together, engaged.

== Plot ==
Three friends change the course of their lives to try to compensate the unfairness of society and, following a family tradition, they found again La Liga de las Espadas (The League of the Swords), a neutral league whose goal is to deliver justice in cases of extreme unfairness. The super goal of three friends is to discover the whereabouts of a treasure, the emerald Alma, to clean up the memory of their fathers, continue with the league and, as soon as they find out about their fathers' murder, to sentence their murderer.

To achieve their goals, the three friends devise strategies, adopt false identities, invent relationships, and stage risky situations, often resulting in confusion and chaos. The group follows a set of self-imposed rules, including never stealing for personal gain, never carrying firearms, and never falling in love with the same woman. These rules go untested until the arrival of Allegra and Ciara complicates matters.

Allegra, rebellious and arrogant, is the daughter of a powerful businessman, who used to be the fourth member of the original league, and the traitor. She is a journalist and a coworker Ciara's, the newspapers photographer. Ciara, like Allegra, is a lady to be reckoned with. Like her mother (the woman who reveals the secret of the former league) she has a deeper understanding for love. Although she does not share the secrets of the league, she is linked to its history: she is the illegitimate daughter of Gino, Allegra's father. Thus, this will be the story of three adventurers and a woman who will fight for justice, debating among impossible love and passions, amid a game who will help them understand the true history of their fathers and the sense of their lives. For society, they are four mad people, four guys who rebel against the system, four people in love with life, four people who are completely different and who have the defects, mistakes, confusions and virtues that make them more real, more alive.

Alma Pirata is a story about friendship, about never giving up, about adventure and justice, about freedom and loyalty, and most of all, it is about love. Main characters in Alma Pirata are Cruz Navarro (Benjamín Rojas), the league nickname Mijaíl; Ivan Ferrer (Fabián Mazzei), the league nickname Aramis, Allegra Riganti (Luisana Lopilato), the league nickname Laika; Benicio de Marco (Mariano Martinez), the league nickname Templario; Andrés de Marco (Nicolás Vazquez), the league nickname Aorta; beautiful Clara Troglio (Isabel Macedo) and Marylin Castellano (Elsa Pinilla), Cruz's love.

== Cast ==
- Mariano Martínez as Benicio de Marco
- Luisana Lopilato as Allegra Riganti
- Nicolás Vázquez as Andrés de Marco
- Benjamín Rojas as Cruz Navarro
- Fabián Mazzei as Ivan Ferrer
- Isabel Macedo as Clara Troglio
- Ignacio Gadano as Gino Riganti
- Elsa Pinilla as Maria Lidia 'Marylin' Castellano
- Julia Calvo as Carlota 'Charly' Troglio
- Peto Menahem as Pablo Rique "El Maestro"
- Agustina Córdova as Candelaria Navarro
- Gerardo Chendo as Francisco
- Misha Arobelidze as Matias

== Awards and nominations ==
- Martin Fierro Awards
  - 2006: Best Youth Comedy - WON
