= Erreway discography =

- Studio albums: 3
- Live albums: 1
- Compilation albums: 2
- Singles: 13
- Music videos: 14

The discography of Argentine pop rock band Erreway who were active between 2002 and 2007 consists of three studio albums, two compilation albums, one live albums and thirteen official singles. Consisting of four leading actors from the television series Rebelde Way — Camila Bordonaba, Felipe Colombo, Luisana Lopilato and Benjamín Rojas — the band functioned actively from 2002 to 2005, selling approximately 10million units worldwide. Several attempts of reunion were unsuccessful, and a new album Vuelvo, recorded by Bordonaba, Colombo and Rojas, has never been released.

== Albums ==
=== Studio albums ===
Year	Album details	Peak chart positions		Certifications
Year	Album details	ARG	ISR	Certifications
2002	Señales: Released: 29 July 2002; Label: Sony, Cris Morena; Formats: CD	1	1	ARG:2× Platinum
2003	Tiempo: Released: 15 April 2003; Label: Sony, Cris Morena; Formats: CD	1	1	ARG: Platinum
2004	Memoria: Released: 1 June 2004; Label: Sony, Cris Morena; Formats: CD, digital download	2	1	ARG: Gold
2021	Vuelvo: Released: 2021; Label: Warner Music Spain; Formats: CD, digital download	—	—	

=== Live albums ===
Year	Album details	Peak chart positions
Year	Album details	GRE
2006	Erreway en Concierto: Released: 29 July 2006 (24 April 2007 in Greece); Label: Warner Music Spain; Formats: CD, digital download	4

=== Compilation albums ===
Year	Album details	Peak chart positions	Certifications
Year	Album details	ESP	Certifications
2006	El Disco de Rebelde Way: Released: 10 October 2006; Label: Warner Music Spain; Formats: CD, digital download	1	SPA: Gold

=== Box sets ===
Year	Album details
2007	Erreway presenta su caja recopilatoria: Released: 8 August 2007; Label: Warner Music Spain; Formats: CD, digital download

== Singles ==
=== Official singles ===
Year	Single	Peak chart positions		Album
Year	Single	ARG	ISR	Album
2002	"Sweet Baby"	1	1	Señales
2002	"Bonita de Más"	2	5	Señales
2002	"Resistiré"	1	1	Señales
2002	"Inmortal"	5	4	Señales
2002	"Te Soñé"	7	8	Tiempo
2002	"Amor de Engaño"	10	9	Señales
2002	"Será Porque Te Quiero"	1	1	Señales
2003	"Tiempo"	1	1	Tiempo
2003	"Será de Dios"	2	3	Tiempo
2003	"Para Cosas Buenas"	1	1	Tiempo
2003	"Que Estés"	5	10	Tiempo
2003	"Vas A Salvarte"	7	9	Tiempo
2004	"Memoria / Que Se Siente"	1	1	Memoria

=== Other releases ===
Year	Single	Peak chart positions			Album
Year	Single	ARG	ISR	ESP	Album
2002	"Coulotte Sexy"	—	—	—	Non–album single
2002	"Dos Segundos"	—	—	—	Non–album single
2003	"We Will Rock You"	—	—	—	Non–album single
2003	"Donde Estas Princesa"	—	—	—	Non–album single

== Music videos ==
Year	Video	Album	Director
2002	"Sweet Baby"	Señales	Cris Morena
2002	"Bonita de Más"	Señales	Cris Morena
2002	"Resistiré"	Señales	Cris Morena
2002	"Inmortal"	Señales	Cris Morena
2002	"Dos Segundos"	Non–album single	Cris Morena
2002	"Te Soñé"	Tiempo	Cris Morena
2002	"Amor de Engaño"	Señales	Cris Morena
2002	"Será Porque Te Quiero"	Señales	Cris Morena
2003	"Tiempo"	Tiempo	Cris Morena
2003	"Será de Dios"	Tiempo	Cris Morena
2003	"Para Cosas Buenas"	Tiempo	Cris Morena
2003	"Que Estés"	Tiempo	Cris Morena
2003	"Vas A Salvarte"	Tiempo	Cris Morena
2004	"Memoria"	Memoria	Tomás Yankelevich
