= Jazmín Beccar Varela =

Argentine actress

- Born: 28 April 1986 (age 40); Buenos Aires, Argentina
- Years active: 2002–present

Jazmín Beccar Varela (born 28 April 1986) is an Argentine actress, probably best known as in Luján Linares in television series Rebelde Way.

== Personal life ==
Jazmín Beccar Varela has three sisters, named Felicitas, Camila, and Paz Beccar Varela. She cites Hugh Grant and Jennifer Aniston as her favourite actors, and Harry Potter series as her favourite books. Beccar Varela is a fan of hockey.

== Career ==
In 2002, Beccar Varela landed the role of Luján Linares in teenage soap opera Rebelde Way, created by famous Argentine producer Cris Morena. She has since become a popular teenage actress in Latin America, Europe and Israel. Beccar Varela appeared in several music videos by Erreway, a music group formed during the making of Rebelde Way. In 2005, Beccar Varela co–starred her Rebelde Way fellow Camila Bordonaba in soap opera El Patrón de la Vereda. Two years later, in 2007, she appeared in television series Romeo y Julieta as Malena Arizmendi, and also provided the song "Muriendo de Amor" to the series soundtrack album. And Patito Feo

== Filmography ==
Year	Title	Role	Notes
2002	Rebelde Way	Luján Linares	(TV Series) (2002–03)
2002	Sweet Baby	Luján Linares	Music Video by Erreway
2002	Bonita de Más	Luján Linares	Music Video by Erreway
2002	Resistiré	Herself	Music Video by Erreway
2003	Tiempo	Corpse	Music Video by Erreway
2003	Para Cosas Buenas	Backing Dancer	Music Video by Erreway
2003	Vas A Salvarte	Herself	Music Video by Erreway
2005	El Patrón de la Vereda	Maggie	(TV Series)
2007	Romeo y Julieta	Malena Arizmendi	(TV Series)
2010	YO SOY VIRGEN	Paola	

== Discography ==
Year	Title	Album	Notes
2002	"Rebelde Way"	Señales	Backing Vocalist for Erreway
2002	"Bonita de Más"	Señales	Backing Vocalist for Erreway
2002	"Resistiré"	Señales	Backing Vocalist for Erreway
2007	"Muriendo de Amor"	Romeo y Julieta	Soundtrack Single
