= Que Estés =

Single by Erreway

from the album Tiempo
- Released: 2003
- Genre: Pop rock
- Length: 3:29
- Label: Sony Music
- Songwriters: Carlos Nilson, Cris Morena
- Producer: Cris Morena

Erreway singles chronology
"Para Cosas Buenas" (2003)	"Que Estés" (2003)	"Vas A Salvarte" (2003)

"Que Estés" (What You Would Be), also known as simply "Que", is a pop rock song performed by Argentine band Erreway. It was written by songwriting team Carlos Nilson and Cris Morena, who is also the creator of Rebelde Way and Erreway, and recorded by Erreway for their second studio album Tiempo (see 2003 in music).

== Other appearances ==
The song was often used in the second season of Rebelde Way (2003), and was performed on band's tours Nuestro Tiempo (2003) and Gira 2004 (2004). It eventually appeared on Erreway en Concierto (2006), El Disco de Rebelde Way (2006) and Erreway presenta su caja recopilatoria (2007), three compilation albums released by the band.

== Music video ==
"Que Estés" owes its popularity to its interesting music video, directed by Cris Morena. It follows four Erreway members — Felipe Colombo, Benjamín Rojas, Camila Bordonaba and Luisana Lopilato — on their road from a garage band to a teen music sensation at the YouTube.
