= Memoria (Erreway song) =

Single by Erreway

from the album Memoria
- A-side: "Memoria"
- B-side: "Que Se Siente"
- Released: June 1, 2004 (Argentina)
- Recorded: 2004
- Genre: Rock
- Length: 4:34
- Label: Sony Music
- Songwriter(s): Cris Morena; Carlos Nilson
- Producer(s): Cris Morena

Erreway singles chronology
"Vas A Salvarte" (2003)	"Memoria" (2004)	"Que Se Siente" (2004)

"Memoria" (Spanish: Memory) is a song by Argentine group Erreway from their third album Memoria, released on 1 June 2004 (see 2004 in music). The song was written by Cris Morena and Carlos Nilson, and features all band members — Benjamín Rojas, Felipe Colombo, Camila Bordonaba and Luisana Lopilato — as lead vocals. Being a hit throughout Latin America, Europe and Israel, "Memoria" was also used as the official soundtrack for Erreway's 2004 film Erreway: 4 Caminos.

== Song information ==
"Memoria" was written by Cris Morena and Carlos Nilson, the usual composers of Erreway's songs. The two has written almost all songs by Erreway, which were recorded for their previous albums Señales (2002) and Tiempo (2003). "Memoria" was chosen to be a titular song for their third album Memoria, which was described as their "most mature album". It features all band members — Benjamín Rojas, Felipe Colombo, Camila Bordonaba and Luisana Lopilato — as lead vocals, with Bordonaba singing Lopilato's part after she left the band in 2007. "Memoria" was the first song on Memoria, and the first and the only official single from the album. In 2007 it was confirmed the song would be re–recorded for Erreway's fourth album Vuelvo, but it is unknown if it would be released as a single.

== Que Se Siente ==
"Que Se Siente" was released as the B–side of "Memoria". Although it was a huge hit throughout Latin America, "Que Se Siente" has never been released as a single. Erreway performed the single during their world tour Gira 2004, but during the Latin America leg only. It was also confirmed the song would be re–recorded for Erreway's new album, Vuelvo, which is still awaiting release.

== Music video and live performances ==
The music video for "Memoria" was made from parts of Erreway's live concerts in Buenos Aires and their movie 4 Caminos. As it was confirmed the song would be re–released for the band's new album Vuelvo, it is unknown if "Memoria" would be released as a single once again nor if a new video was going to be made.

Erreway performed "Memoria" during their 2004 world tour Gira 2004 as the second song in Israeli leg, after "Para Cosas Buenas". In Latin America leg, it was performed the last. It was also performed by Benjamín Rojas, Felipe Colombo and Camila Bordonaba during their 2007 tour in Spain.

== Chart positions ==
Chart	Peak position
Argentine Singles Chart	1
Ecuador Singles Chart	1
Israeli Singles Chart	1
Uruguay Singles Chart	1
