= Sweet Baby (Erreway song) =

Single by Erreway

from the album Señales
- Released: 2003 (Argentina)
- Recorded: 2002
- Genre: Pop
- Length: 3:21
- Label: Sony Music
- Songwriters: Cris Morena, Carlos Nilson
- Producer: Cris Morena

Erreway singles chronology
"Sweet Baby" (2003)	"Bonita de Más" (2002)

"Sweet Baby" is the debut single by Argentine pop band Erreway from their debut album Señales. It was released through Sony Music in 2002 (see 2002 in music). The single, which features all four members — Felipe Colombo, Benjamín Rojas, Camila Bordonaba and Luisana Lopilato — was written by recognized Argentine director, producer and composer Cris Morena.

== Song information ==
"Sweet Baby" was written by Cris Morena and Carlos Nilson, who wrote most of the songs for Erreway albums Señales (2002), Tiempo (2003) and Memoria (2004). The song contains lines mostly in Spanish, but also in English. Released as the first single from Señales, it was also the opening song from the album. "Sweet Baby" features all band members — Felipe Colombo, Benjamín Rojas, Camila Bordonaba and Luisana Lopilato — as leading vocals.

== Other appearances ==
"Sweet Baby" appears in television series Rebelde Way (2002–03). In the series, the song was written by Mía Colucci, the character of Luisana Lopilato. At the time, the band consisted of Marizza Pía Spirito (Camila Bordonaba), Pablo Bustamante (Benjamín Rojas), Manuel Aguirre (Felipe Colombo) and Felicitas "Feli" Mitre (Ángeles Balbiani), but they performed it with Mía after Feli had left. They would later perform the song for several times.

"Sweet Baby" is standard song on Erreway's compilation albums, as Erreway en Concierto (2006), El Disco de Rebelde Way (2006) and Erreway presenta su caja recopilatoria (2007). It was performed on every Erreway's live show, including Summer Happy Day festival in Spain in Summer 2007, where it was performed by Bordonaba, Colombo and Rojas only.

== See also ==
- Erreway discography
