= Tiempo (Erreway song) =

Single by Erreway

from the album Tiempo
- Released: 2003
- Recorded: 2003
- Genre: Rock
- Length: 4:06
- Label: Sony Music
- Songwriter: Cris Morena
- Producer: Cris Morena

Erreway singles chronology
"Será Porque Te Quiero" (2002)	"Tiempo" (2003)	"Será de Dios" (2003)

"Tiempo" (Time) is a rock song performed by Argentine band Erreway. It is the opening song and single from their second studio album Tiempo, and was written by eminent producer, director and composer Cris Morena. In January 2003, the song reached number one in Argentina and Israel, and was a massive hit throughout Latin America and Europe. "Tiempo" was the opening theme of the television series Rebelde Way during the second season, and was performed by Erreway in its final episode. is the opening single from Tiempo, the second album of Argentine band Erreway.

== Song information ==
"Tiempo" was written in 2003 by Rebelde Way and Erreway creator Cris Morena for the band's second album Tiempo (see 2003 in music). Although "Te Soñé" was released before "Tiempo", "Tiempo" served as the opening single for the album, while "Te Soñé" was re–released. It is considered to be the most successful single of Erreway and as one of their signature songs, along with "Para Cosas Buenas" and "Memoria", reaching number one throughout Latin America, Europe and Israel.

== Other appearances ==
"Tiempo" was used as the opening theme for the second season of Rebelde Way, and was later replaced with "Para Cosas Buenas". It was also performed by Erreway members Manuel Aguirre (Felipe Colombo), Pablo Bustamante (Benjamín Rojas), Marizza Andrade (Camila Bordonaba) and Mía Colucci (Luisana Lopilato) in the final Rebelde Way episode. The song was eventually included on Erreway en Concierto (2006), El Disco de Rebelde Way (2006) and Erreway presenta su caja recopilatoria (2007), three compilation albums released by the band.

== Music video ==
Erreway and Rebelde Way creator Cris Morena directed the music video for "Tiempo". It opens with Felipe Colombo playing the electric guitar. The band performs the song and is heard by corpses, played by Rebelde Way cast members, and they rise from their greaves, desiring a new start. Erreway and Rebelde Way actors are then dressed in white, and dance in the rain. At the end of the video, they lie down.

== Chart performance ==
Chart	Peak position
Argentine Singles Chart	1
Ecuador Singles Chart	1
Israeli Singles Chart	1
Uruguay Singles Chart	1
