= Vas a Salvarte =

Single by Erreway

from the album Tiempo
- Released: 2003
- Genre: Pop rock
- Length: 3:18
- Label: Sony Music
- Songwriter: Cris Morena
- Producer: Cris Morena

Erreway singles chronology
"Te Soñé" (2003)	"Vas a Salvarte" (2003)	"Memoria" (2004)

"Vas a Salvarte" (You Will Save Yourself) is a pop rock song performed by Argentine band Erreway. It was written and produced by Cris Morena, also the creator of Rebelde Way and Erreway, and recorded by Erreway for their second studio album Tiempo (see 2003 in music). "Vas a Salvarte" was the final single from Tiempo, being followed by "Memoria" from the band's 2004 album Memoria.

== Other appearances ==
The song was often used in the second season of Rebelde Way (2003), and was performed on band's tours Nuestro Tiempo (2003) and Gira 2004 (2004). It eventually appeared on Erreway en Concierto (2006), El Disco de Rebelde Way (2006) and Erreway presenta su caja recopilatoria (2007), three compilation albums released by the band.

== Music video ==
The music video for "Vas a Salvarte" was shot during Erreway's tour Nuestro Tiempo (2003), and shows scenes and details from the 2003 tour. It features four Erreway members — Felipe Colombo, Benjamín Rojas, Camila Bordonaba and Luisana Lopilato — and the rest of Rebelde Way cast, who were on the tour as backing vocals and dancers.
