= Será de Dios =

Single by Erreway

from the album Tiempo
- Released: 2003
- Recorded: 2003
- Genre: Pop
- Length: 3:55
- Label: Sony Music
- Songwriters: Cris Morena, Silvio Furmansky
- Producer: Cris Morena

Erreway singles chronology
"Tiempo" (2003)	"Será de Dios" (2003)	"Para Cosas Buenas" (2003)

"Será de Dios" (It Would Be Because of God) is a pop ballad performed by Argentine band Erreway. It was released through Sony Music as the second single from their second studio album Tiempo in 2003 (see 2003 in music). The song was written by famous producer, director and composer Cris Morena and Silvio Furmansky, and features vocals of all four Erreway members — Camila Bordonaba, Benjamín Rojas, Felipe Colombo and Luisana Lopilato.

== Other appearances ==
The song was often used during the second season of Rebelde Way, mostly for romantic scenes between Pablo Bustamante (Benjamín Rojas) and Marizza Andrade (Camila Bordonaba). Besides Tiempo, it also appeared on Erreway en Concierto (2006), El Disco de Rebelde Way (2006) and Erreway presenta su caja recopilatoria (2007), three compilation albums released by the band.

== Music video ==
The music video, directed by Cris Morena, shows four Erreway members — Camila Bordonaba, Benjamín Rojas, Felipe Colombo and Luisana Lopilato — suffering in private, having a bath, while they sing about their love pains.
