= Amor de Engaño =

Single by Erreway

from the album Señales
- Released: 2003
- Recorded: 2002
- Genre: Pop
- Length: 3:59
- Label: Sony Music
- Songwriter(s): Cris Morena
- Producer(s): Cris Morena

Erreway singles chronology
| "Inmortal" (2002) | "Amor de Engaño" (2003) | "Será Porque Te Quiero" (2002) |

"Amor de Engaño" (Love Cheats) is a pop ballad performed by Argentine band Erreway. It was written and produced by eminent producer, director and composer Cris Morena for the band's debut album Señales. The song features Felipe Colombo as its lead vocalist, and Camila Bordonaba, Benjamín Rojas and Luisana Lopilato as back vocalists. "Amor de Engaño" was often used in television series Rebelde Way season one, during the romantic scenes — mostly between Manuel Aguirre (Felipe Colombo) and Mía Colucci (Luisana Lopilato).

== Other appearances ==
"Amor de Engaño" enjoyed a radio success throughout Latin America, Europe and Israel. It was featured in television series Rebelde Way for several times. The song also appeared on every compilation album released by Erreway — Erreway en Concierto (2006), El Disco de Rebelde Way (2006) and Erreway presenta su caja recopilatoria (2007).

== Music video ==
The music video for "Amor de Engaño" was directed by Rebelde Way and Erreway creator Cris Morena. It features the band members Felipe Colombo and Luisana Lopilato as its protagonists. Lopilato plays a famous stage performer, while Colombo is her assistant to whom she does not pay attention.
