= Bonita de Más =

Single by Erreway

from the album Señales
- Released: 2003
- Recorded: 2002
- Genre: Dance-pop
- Length: 3:15
- Label: Sony Music
- Songwriter(s): Cris Morena, Carlos Nilson
- Producer(s): Cris Morena

Erreway singles chronology
"Sweet Baby" (2002)	"Bonita de Más" (2003)	"Resistiré" (2002)

"Bonita de Más" (Too Pretty) is a dance-pop song performed by Argentine band Erreway. It was written by famous Argentine producer, director and composer Cris Morena and Carlos Nilson in 2002 for the band's debut album Señales. Besides Erreway members Felipe Colombo, Benjamín Rojas, Camila Bordonaba and Luisana Lopilato, the song features other Rebelde Way cast as backing vocals and few solo lines sung by Victoria Maurette. "Bonita de Más" was the first Erreway song, after the opening theme "Rebelde Way" and the closing theme "Resistiré", to be featured in Rebelde Way.

== Song information ==
"Bonita de Más" was written by Cris Morena and Carlos Nilson, who wrote most of the songs for Erreway's albums Señales (2002), Tiempo (2003) and Memoria (2004). The lyrics is written in Spanish, except for one line in English — "Kiss me, baby!" — sung by Camila Bordonaba, Luisana Lopilato and Victoria Maurette. "Bonita de Más" features Rebelde Way cast members as backing vocals during the chorus, and several singles lines sung by Victoria Maurette.

== Other appearances ==
"Bonita de Más" became a massive radio hit throughout Latin America, Europe and Israel. It was featured in television series Rebelde Way for several times. It was the first Erreway song, after the opening theme "Rebelde Way" and the closing theme "Resistiré", to be featured in Rebelde Way. Besides Señales, the song appeared on every compilation album released by Erreway — Erreway en Concierto (2006), El Disco de Rebelde Way (2006) and Erreway presenta su caja recopilatoria (2007).

== Music video ==
The music video for "Bonita de Más" was directed by Rebelde Way and Erreway creator Cris Morena. It features the band members Felipe Colombo, Benjamín Rojas, Camila Bordonaba and Luisana Lopilato as its protagonists and other Rebelde Way actors as a supporting cast. The video follows teenage girls and boys — mainly Colombo and Lopilato, and Bordonaba and Rojas — on their way from the first meeting to the couple.
