= Será Porque Te Quiero =

Single by Erreway

from the album Señales
- Released: 2003 (Argentina)
- Recorded: 2002
- Genre: Pop, dance-pop, hip hop
- Length: 3:21
- Label: Sony Music
- Songwriters: Cris Morena, Carlos Nilson
- Producer: Cris Morena

Erreway singles chronology
"Amor de Engaño" (2003)	"Será Porque Te Quiero" (2003)	"Te Soñé" (2002)

"Será Porque Te Quiero" (It Must Be Because I Love You) is the sixth and the final single by Erreway from their debut album Señales. As one of their greatest hits, it later appeared on their compilation albums Erreway en Concierto, El Disco de Rebelde Way and Erreway presenta su caja recopilatoria. It was released in by Sony Music in November 2002 (see 2002 in music), following other Señales singles — "Sweet Baby", "Bonita de Más", "Resistiré", "Imortal" and "Amor de Engaño". The song featured prominently in their 2025 reunion tour.

== Media appearances ==
Erreway members performed the song several times in their television series Rebelde Way. They performed it few times when Erreway performed in a local club, and also at the birthday party of Camila Bordonaba and Luisana Lopilato's characters Marizza and Mía. Away from being one of the songs from Erreway's 2002 album Señales, "Será Porque Te Quiero" appeared on three greatest hits compilations of the group — Erreway en Concierto (2006), El Disco de Rebelde Way (2006) and Erreway presenta su caja recopilatoria (2007). The song was also covered by actors Agustín Sierra and Candela Vetrano in the Cris Morena Group series Casi Ángeles.
