= Resistiré (Erreway song) =

Single by Erreway

from the album Señales
- Released: 2003
- Genre: Pop rock
- Length: 3:24
- Label: Sony Music
- Songwriter(s): Carlos Nilson, Cris Morena
- Producer(s): Cris Morena

Erreway singles chronology
"Bonita de Más" (2002)	"Resistiré" (2003)	"Inmortal" (2002)

"Resistiré" (I Will Resist) is a pop rock song performed by Argentine band Erreway. The song was used as the closing theme for the Cris Morena Group series Rebelde Way. "Resistiré" is considered one of the band's biggest hits.

== Song information ==
In television series Rebelde Way, "Resistiré" was written by Pablo Bustamante (Benjamín Rojas) and was dedicated to Marizza Spirito (Camila Bordonaba), telling the story of friendship and rebellion. In reality, the song was written by Cris Morena and Carlos Nilson, who wrote most of the songs for Erreway's albums Señales (2002), Tiempo (2003) and Memoria (2004).

== Other appearances ==
"Resistiré" was often used in the television series Rebelde Way. It was its closing theme during almost whole series. As one of the biggest hits performed by Erreway, the song appeared on every compilation album released by Erreway — Erreway en Concierto (2006), El Disco de Rebelde Way (2006) and Erreway presenta su caja recopilatoria (2007).

== Music video ==
The music video for "Resistiré" was directed by Rebelde Way and Erreway creator Cris Morena. The video features the band members Felipe Colombo, Benjamín Rojas, Camila Bordonaba and Luisana Lopilato as its protagonists and other Rebelde Way actors as a supporting cast. It follows friends who stay together in both good times and bad times, while they also develop themselves as personalities.
