= Vuelvo (album) =

Studio album by Erreway
- Released: June 18, 2021
- Recorded: 2007
- Genre: Pop, Rock
- Label: Cris Morena Group

Erreway chronology
| Memoria (2004) | Vuelvo (2021) |

Vuelvo is the fourth studio album by the Argentine group Erreway. After their separation, Cris Morena decided to return with the group, but Luisana Lopilato decided not to return because she was filming the TV show Casados con hijos and could not due to the filming schedules. From that moment on, Erreway went from having four members to three.

== Background ==
The album was recorded between June and July 2007 in Buenos Aires. The album contains new songs and some songs from their previous studio album Memoria, with the difference that in these versions Luisana's voice is not present. It also included some songs that were part of the soundtrack of the series Atrapados, starring Felipe Colombo and Benjamin Rojas and also of other projects such as Casi ángeles, Alma Pirata and Jake and Blake, which also starred Benjamin Rojas, in the case of Casi ángeles appearing as a special guest.

Originally, the album was to be released only in Spain, a place they had already visited in their previous tour "Erreway: Gira en España", and where the telenovela Rebelde Way was starting to be broadcast at that time and became more popular as time went by. Although it was recorded, the production company did not release the album that year. And finally the project was cancelled. Although some of the songs were reused for Cris Morena's future projects. While other songs from the album, were leaked in their demo versions by the YouTube platform.

In 2020, after the anniversary of the release of the telenovela Rebelde Way and its release in streaming on Netflix, Cris Morena announced that the album would be released in 2021, fourteen years after it was recorded.

On May 28, 2021, the first promotional song called “Vuelvo” was released, and a week later on June 4 “Vamos al cielo” was released, a song that was part of the soundtrack of the Disney Channel series Jake & Blake. With the difference that this version of the album had the backing vocals of Camila Bordonaba and Felipe.

Finally and after 14 years of being recorded on June 18, 2021, the album was released to all digital platforms.

== Track listing ==
Credits from Tidal.

| No. | Title | Lyrics | Length |
|---|---|---|---|
| 1. | "Girar" | Gustavo Ariel Novello; María Cristina De Giácomi | 3:11 |
| 2. | "Vuelvo" | Novello; De Giácomi; Furmanski | 5:15 |
| 3. | "Vivo como vivo" (2007 version) | Novello; De Giácomi; Furmanski | 3:20 |
| 4. | "Vamos al cielo" | Novello; De Giácomi; Furmanski | 4:10 |
| 5. | "No tengo tiempo para esto" | Novello; De Giácomi; Furmanski; Román Jorge Martino | 2:46 |
| 6. | "Vuelo Solo" | Novello; De Giácomi; Furmanski; Martino | 3:49 |
| 7. | "Bandera Blanca" (2007 version) | Novello; De Giácomi; Furmanski | 3:49 |
| 8. | "Que se siente" (2007 version) | Novello; De Giácomi; Furmanski | 4:27 |
| 9. | "Nada me detiene" (2007 version) | Novello; De Giácomi; Furmanski | 4:53 |
| 10. | "Dejame volar" | Novello; De Giácomi; Corazzina; Furmanski | 2:58 |
| 11. | "Memoria" (2007 version) | Novello; De Giácomi; Furmanski | 5:17 |
| Total length: | | | 43:42 |
