= Te Soñé =

2002 single by Erreway

Single by Erreway

from the album Tiempo
- Released: 2003
- Genre: Pop rock
- Length: 3:00
- Label: Sony Music
- Songwriter(s): Cris Morena, Silvio Furmansky
- Producer(s): Cris Morena

Erreway singles chronology
"Será Porque Te Quiero" (2003)	"Te Soñé" (2003)	"Tiempo" (2003)

"Te Soñé" (I Dreamed You) is a pop rock song performed by Argentine band Erreway, featuring Felipe Colombo as the lead vocalist. Camila Bordonaba, Luisana Lopilato and Benjamín Rojas recorded back vocals for the song. It was written by Rebelde Way and Erreway creator Cris Morena and Silvio Furmansky in 2003, and appeared on the band's second album Tiempo. "Te Soñé" was recorded and released in 2003, but then re–released in 2003 as one of Tiempo singles, when a real success came.

== Other appearances ==
The song was used in the television series Rebelde Way in numerous occasions. Besides Tiempo, it appeared on every compilation album released by Erreway — Erreway en Concierto (2006), El Disco de Rebelde Way (2006) and Erreway presenta su caja recopilatoria (2007). Although it was included on Tiempo (2003), the song was performed on the Erreway en Grand Rex tour (2002).

== Music video ==
Directed by Erreway and Rebelde Way creator Cris Morena, the video features Felipe Colombo and Luisana Lopilato, with their clothes changing colours in red, yellow and green, the colours of traffic light.
