= El Disco de Rebelde Way =

Greatest hits album by Erreway
- Released: 2006
- Recorded: 2006
- Genre: Pop, rock
- Label: Warner Music Spain
- Producer: Cris Morena

Erreway chronology
Erreway en Concierto (2006)	El Disco de Rebelde Way (2006)	Erreway presenta su caja recopilatoria (2007)

El Disco de Rebelde Way is a compilation album of the greatest hits by Argentine band Erreway. It was released exclusively in Spain in 2006. It sold more 180,000 copies. The album consists of the greatest hits from the albums Señales and Tiempo and one DVD. Artists appearing on the album were Felipe Colombo, Camila Bordonaba, Benjamín Rojas and Luisana Lopilato.

The compilation was produced, created and directed by Cris Morena. Music and lyrics were made by Cris Morena, Silvio Furmansky, Gustavo Novello and Carlos Nilson, who worked with Erreway earlier. Once again, Warner Music was Erreway's label.

== Track listing ==
=== Album ===
1. "Tiempo"
2. "Rebelde Way"
3. "Será de Dios"
4. "Bonita de Más"
5. "Para Cosas Buenas"
6. "Invento"
7. "Sweet Baby"
8. "Te Soñé"
9. "Vas A Salvarte"
10. "Inmortal"
11. "Resistiré"
12. "Será Porque Te Quiero"
13. "Amor de Engaño"
14. "Perder Un Amigo"
15. "Dije Adiós"
16. "Aún, Ahora'
17. "Me Da Igual"
18. "Que Estés"
19. "Vamos Al Ruedo"

=== DVD ===
1. "Para Cosas Buenas"
2. "Será de Dios"
3. "Vas A Salvarte"
4. "Tiempo"
5. "Que Estés"
6. "Te Soñé"
7. "Resistiré"
8. "Será Porque Te Quiero"
9. "Inmortal"
10. "Sweet Baby"
11. "Bonita de Más"

== Charts ==
=== Weekly charts ===
Chart (2006)	Peak Position
Spanish Albums (PROMUSICAE)	1

=== Year-end charts ===
Chart (2006)	Peak position
Spanish Albums Chart	32
