= Marizza Pía Andrade =

Marizza Pía Spirito/Andrade
- Portrayed by: Camila Bordonaba
- First appearance: First episode
- Last appearance: 318th episode (last episode)
- Appears in: 318
- Created by: Cris Morena
In-universe information
- Occupation: Singer in band erreway, student
- Other relatives: Sonia Rey (mother); Octavio Andrade (father); Fabrizio Spirito (first step-father); Franco Colucci (second step-father); Mia Colucci (step-sister); Luján Linares (step-sister); Hilda Acosta (as grandmother); Pablo Bustamante (boyfriend)

Marizza Pía Spirito/Andrade is fictional character, played by actress and singer Camila Bordonaba, in Argentinian hit TV show Rebelde Way.

== Fictional character biography ==
Marizza Pía Andrade was born in Buenos Aires, November 22, 1987. Her parents are famous artist Sonia Rey and her Art teacher Octavio/Martín Andrade. But, her mother lied, and Marizza was told she is the daughter of Italian businessman Fabrizio Spirito.

Marizza's childhood was unhappy. People always saw her mother's beauty, and not Marizza's. So, she became rebel and impulsive. She is probably the greater rebel in "Rebel's Way" than other three lead characters, Pablo, Manuel and Mía.

== Season 1 ==
By order of Spirito, Marizza starts going to "Elite Way School". She doesn't like it at first view, but later, she loves it. Marizza's friends are Luján and Luna, later Laura. Luna is also friend of Mía, who is Marizza's enemy. Marizza's best male friend is Manuel. She had relationship with Marcos, but later they are just friends. She is in love with Pablo, but she is afraid to show it, because she thinks he hates her. So, she pretends she hates him too.

Pablo and Marizza have complicated relationship. In one moment, they are the best friends, in other the worst enemies. In first season, they become so close, that it seems they are becoming couple. But, then Spirito takes Marizza to Italy for a month. When she returns, Pablo already has new girlfriend, Paula (who is actually a prostitute, who is hired by Sergio Bustamante). Marizza reveals Pablo the truth, and Paula thinks that Marizza is in love with Pablo. In one moment, they become couple, but than Tomás reveals that Pablo and he made a bet. Hurt, Marizza brakes up.

== Season 2 ==
As Sonia and Franco Colucci get married, Marizza and Mía become step-sisters, but also the best friends. Not just Mía, Luján also becomes Marizza's step-sister, because Sonia adopts her.

In last episode, Marizza and Pablo become couple. Pablo, who has a fight with his dad, now is alone, and Marizza calls his mother, Mora, to come home from England and take care of Pablo. After she tells it to Pablo, he kisses her and they become couple. The rebels are the Best in the world. Firma Sonia Rey.
