= Cuatro Caminos =

Cuatro Caminos or 4 Caminos may refer to:

- Cuatro Caminos (Madrid), a Spanish ward
  - Cuatro Caminos (Madrid Metro), a subway station serving the ward
- Cuatro Caminos (Murcia), a staging point on the GR 92 long-distance footpath
- Cuatro Caminos (album), a 2003 album by Café Tacuba
- Cuatro Caminos metro station (Naucalpan), a Mexico City Metro station
- Toreo de Cuatro Caminos, a former bullring and landmark in Naucalpan, State of Mexico
- Erreway: 4 caminos, a 2004 Argentine film
