= Erreway presenta su caja recopilatoria =

Compilation album by Erreway
- Released: 2007 in Spain
- Recorded: 2007
- Genres: Pop, rock
- Length: 40:56 (Señales); 46:26 (Tiempo)
- Labels: Yair Dori International, Cris Morena Group
- Producer: Cris Morena

Erreway chronology
El Disco de Rebelde Way (2004)	Erreway presenta su caja recopilatoria (2007)

Erreway presenta su caja recopilatoria is compilation of hits of Argentine band Erreway. It was released in 2007, specially for Spain, but it was sold in other parts of the world. On compilation, there are songs from their albums Señales and Tiempo and live performed songs. There are also two DVDs, one with Erreway's videos, and one with videos from their tour.

== About compilation ==
Three members of Erreway - Camila Bordonaba, Felipe Colombo and Benjamin Rojas - used old materials from albums and DVDs to make compilation for their public in Spain. Erreway used songs from their albums Señales and Tiempo (but not from Memoria) and videos for singles from these two album. On album, there is one CD with live performed songs and one with videos from live concerts in Spain. Even she is not member of Erreway anymore, Luisana Lopilato was on CD cover.

== Songs ==
=== Señales ===
1. Sweet Baby

2. Bonita de Más

3. Pretty Boy

4. Aún Ahora

5. Resistiré

6. Inmortal

7. Amor de Engaño

8. Mi Vida

9. Vave La Pena

10. Será Porque Te Quiero

11. Perder Un Amigo

12. Rebelde Way

=== Tiempo ===
1. Tiempo

2. Será de Dios

3. Para Cosas Buenas

4. Dije Adiós

5. Me Da Igual

6. Que Estés

7. No Estés Seguro

8. No Se Puede Más

9. Te Soñé

10. Invento

11. Vas A Salvarte

12. Vamos Al Ruedo

=== Live ===
1. Rebelde Way

2. Bonita de Más

3. Te Soñé

4. Perder Un Amigo

5. Te Dejé

6. Vave La Pena

7. Sweet Baby

8. Aún Ahora

9. Pretty Boy

10. Inmortal

11. Mi Vida

12. Tiempo

13. No Soy Así

14. Será Porque Te Quiero

15. Sweet Baby (reprise)

16. Rebelde Way (reprise)

17. Resistiré

=== Videos ===
1. Para Cosas Buenas

2. Será de Dios

3. Vas A Salvarte

4. Tiempo

5. Que Estés

6. Te Soñé

7. Resistiré

8. Será Porque Te Quiero

9. Inmortal

10. Sweet Baby

11. Perder Un Amigo

=== Live ===
1. Rebelde Way

2. Bonita de Más

3. Te Soñé

4. Perder Un Amigo

5. Te Dejé

6. Vave La Pena

7. Sweet Baby

8. Aún Ahora

9. Pretty Boy

10. Inmortal

11. Mi Vida

12. Tiempo

13. No Soy Así

14. We Will Rock You

15. Será Porque Te Quiero

16. Sweet Baby (reprise)

17. Rebelde Way (reprise)

18. Resistiré
