= Para Cosas Buenas =

Single by Erreway

from the album Tiempo
- Released: 2003
- Recorded: 2003
- Genre: Pop rock, R&B
- Length: 3:10
- Label: Sony Music
- Songwriters: Cris Morena, Carlos Nilson
- Producer: Cris Morena

Erreway singles chronology
"Será de Dios" (2003)	"Para Cosas Buenas" (2003)	"Que Estés" (2003)

"Para Cosas Buenas" (For Good Things) is a pop rock/R&B song performed by Argentine band Erreway. It was written by Erreway and Rebelde Way creator Cris Morena and songwriter Carlos Nilson for the band's second studio album Tiempo in 2003 (see 2003 in music). The song became a huge radio hit throughout Latin America, Europe and Israel, becoming one of the most successful singles by Erreway. "Para Cosas Buenas" is considered to be one of the band's signature songs.

== Track listing ==
1. "Para Cosas Buenas" (Cris Morena, Carlos Nilson) — 03:10
2. "Para Cosas Buenas" (Reggae Version) (Cris Morena, Carlos Nilson) — 00:36

== Song information ==
"Para Cosas Buenas" was written by Erreway and Rebelde Way creator Cris Morena, a famous director, producer and composer, and songwriter Carlos Nilson for the band's second studio album Tiempo in 2003 (see 2003 in music). The song combines elements of pop rock with R&B and hip hop. It became one of the biggest hits ever released by Erreway, topping charts throughout Latin America, Europe and Israel. Band member Camila Bordonaba named "Para Cosas Buenas" her favourite song of the band. "Para Cosas Buenas" is considered to be one of the band's signature songs. The song also has its reggae version, which was performed during their tours Nuestro Tiempo and Gira 2004.

== Other appearances ==
The song was used as the opening theme for the second season of Rebelde Way, replacing "Tiempo". "Rebelde Way" eventually returned for the final episode, replacing "Para Cosas Buenas". As one of the biggest hits by Erreway, the song was included on Erreway en Concierto (2006), El Disco de Rebelde Way (2006) and Erreway presenta su caja recopilatoria (2007), three compilation albums released by the band.

== Music video ==
The music video, directed by Cris Morena, was shot in a futuristic style, in a mirror room. It does not have a specific storyline, and features Erreway members and Rebelde Way cast members as backing dancers. The video dominated on television stations in Argentina, Latin America, Israel, and Europe in 2003.
