= Erreway =

Argentine Latin pop-rock group

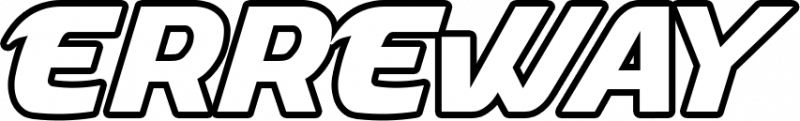

Background information
- Also known as: RWay
- Origin: Buenos Aires, Argentina
- Genres: Latin pop; teen pop; rock
- Years active: 2002–2004; 2006–2007; 2024–present
- Labels: Sony; Warner (Spain)
- Members: Camila Bordonaba; Felipe Colombo; Benjamín Rojas
- Past members: Luisana Lopilato

Erreway is an Argentine pop music group formed during the television series Rebelde Way, consisting of Camila Bordonaba, Felipe Colombo, Luisana Lopilato and Benjamín Rojas. Releasing three studio albums – Señales, Tiempo, Memoria and Vuelvo – Erreway sold one million records and achieved several Platinum and Gold album certifications in Argentina, Spain and Israel.

== Members ==
Birth name	Date of birth	Home town
Felipe Colombo	8 January 1983 (age 43)	Mexico City, Mexico
Camila Bordonaba	4 September 1984 (age 42)	El Palomar, Buenos Aires, Argentina
Benjamín Rojas	16 April 1985 (age 41)	La Plata, Argentina
Luisana Lopilato	18 May 1987 (age 39)	Vancouver, Canada

== Musicians of the band ==
- Silvio Furmanski – (guitar)
- Laura Corazzina – (bass)
- Luis Burgio – (drums)
- Gustavo Novello – (keyboard)
- Florencia Ciarlo – (choir)
- Willie Lorenzo – (choir, guitar and Erreway`s vocal coach)

== Group history ==
=== Chiquititas and beginnings; 1996–2001 ===
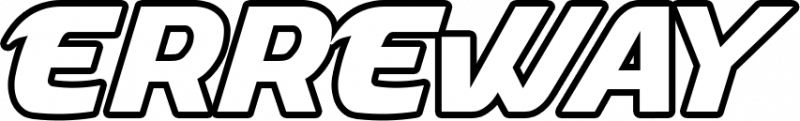
Official Erreway logo

Chiquititas was a popular Argentine television series for children and young adults in Argentina. It was created by eminent television producer Cris Morena, and also got its versions in Brazil and Mexico. Camila Bordonaba was the first to join Chiquititas, capturing the role of Pato in 1996. In 1999, her original character, "Pato", left the series, and Bordonaba returned as Camila Bustillo. Felipe Colombo at first starred in Mexican version of Chiquititas, joining original series in 1999 together with Luisana Lopilato. And Benjamín Rojas was cast in 1998. In 2001, they reprised their roles in Chiquititas 2001 film spin–off Chiquititas: Rincón de Luz. While acting in Chiquititas, they all discovered their musical talents.

=== Rebelde Way, Señales and Tiempo; 2002–03 ===
In 2002 Bordonaba, Colombo, Lopilato and Rojas were cast for the Cris Morena Group television series Rebelde Way as, respectively, Marizza Pía Spirito, Manuel Aguirre, Mía Colucci and Pablo Bustamante. Rebelde Way enjoyed an international success, filming in 2002–03. As the leading four, Bordonaba, Colombo, Lopilato and Rojas signed a recording contract with Sony Music. Their debut album Señales was released in 2002 (see 2002 in music), selling in 1 million records worldwide and achieving double Platinum certification in Argentina. Its songs were used in the first season of Rebelde Way. Señales singles "Sweet Baby", "Bonita de Más", "Resistiré", "Inmortal", "Amor de Engaño" and "Será Porque Te Quiero" also enjoyed a great success, topping charts throughout Latin America, Spain, Greece and Israel. Erreway held a sold out concert at the Grand Rex in Buenos Aires in December 2002.

Erreway's second album, Tiempo, was released in 2003 (see 2003 in music). It sold in 2 million records worldwide and was named their best album by critics. Singles "Tiempo", "Será de Dios", "Para Cosas Buenas", "Que Estés", "Te Soñé" and "Vas A Salvarte" achieved international success, followed by a promotional tour Nuestro Tiempo. At Nuestro Tiempo tour Erreway was supported by Rebelde Way cast members, with Victoria Maurette and Piru Sáez occasionally performing their solo songs. In December 2003 Rebelde Way ended.

=== 4 Caminos, Memoria and the departure of Lopilato; 2004–05 ===
In 2004, after Rebelde Way ended, Erreway signed contracts for one more album and a Rebelde Way spin–off film, in which they would star as their Rebelde Way characters Manuel, Marizza, Mía and Pablo. 4 Caminos was premiered on 1 June 2004 and, although it was received negatively by film critics, it was a box office success. Erreway's third album Memoria was released on 2 June 2004 (see 2004 in music) and included the songs from 4 Caminos. Memoria spawned one single, "Memoria", with its B-side "Que Se Siente". "Memoria" eventually became the most successful Erreway single, debuting at number 1 at the Argentine Billboard Chart. It also stands as one of the most successful songs written by Cris Morena. After a successful tour, Gira 2004, Erreway announced a short pause in their career together.

Erreway had their first tour without Luisana Lopilato in 2005, which resulted in Camila Bordonaba singing her song lines. Lopilato officially missed the tour due to the tour dates conflicting with the filming of her telenovela Casados con Hijos. Shortly after, it was announced Lopilato had left the band. "I had no time for tour because of the work. I told our producer I could go on the next tour, but he obviously did not report that to Camila, Benjamín and Felipe. Thus everyone thinks I left the band. But, now, I can say to you that I will not be going back to Erreway, though who knows what will be in the future", Lopilato stated for an interview for Bravo.

=== New tours and activities, and La Miss Tijuana; 2006–10 ===
In the summer of 2006 Bordonaba and Colombo went to Spain to promote the compilation album, Erreway en Concierto. The album included an album of Erreway's greatest hits and a DVD, with videos of tour footage. It was released by Warner Music Spain. In 2007, Erreway — consisting of Bordonaba, Colombo and Rojas — performed at the Spanish music festival Sunny Happy Day in front of 50 thousand people, and also released their greatest hits compilation Erreway presenta su caja recopilatoria.

Soon after, Erreway announced they would once again visit Spain. It was soon reported the fourth member, Luisana Lopilato, would begin recording her first solo album, instead of joining them. Erreway then cancelled their new Spanish tour and announced they would visit Spain after the recording of their new studio album, which would be released in Spain. Erreway confirmed that, unlike their previous albums, Vuelvo would feature songs written by the band themselves. They also announced the album would contain twelve songs, including five rerecorded songs from their 2004 album Memoria and seven new songs The album was set to be released in 2008, but was postponed. In October 2009, it was rumoured Erreway would reunite once again as a quartet on 8 October, which has been named the International Day of Erreway, for a European tour, but it did not occur.

In 2010, it was reported Camila Bordonaba and Felipe Colombo had formed a band, La Miss Tijuana, with their friend Willie Lorenzo, who had previously sung backing vocals for Erreway. The band has already published several songs on their Facebook and MySpace pages, marking the final split of Erreway.

=== New Band formed; 2012-Present ===
Felipe Colombo, Benjamín Rojas and Willie Lorenzo formed a new band named Roco. In 2021 the band released a new album Vuelvo. On November 25, 2024 Camila Bordonaba, Felipe Colombo y Benjamín Rojas announced a reunion tour of Erreway, launching in 2025.

== Personal and media lives ==
With the success of their albums and Rebelde Way, Erreway members have become household names in Argentina, as well as international stars. Luisana Lopilato and Camila Bordonaba, Lopilato especially, were named one of the sexiest women in many countries, Argentina, Spain and Greece mostly. All members also became a regular feature of the press.

Bordonaba and Benjamín Rojas were a couple on and off screen; they began dating while filming Chiquititas and broke up months later . Lopilato and Felipe Colombo were also dating for more than five years, although they were often hiding it, and broke up after a camera caught them kissing, it was a big scandal. Lopilato has also attracted a lot of media attention with her relationships with actor Mariano Martínez, tennis player Juan Mónaco and singer Michael Bublé.

After the success of Rebelde Way, Televisa produced a Mexican version of the series, entitled Rebelde. Rebelde and the band formed from the show, RBD, also joined worldwide success. Media spread rumours the band were feuding, but both bands denied any sort of feud. Bordonaba later stated, "I think the rivalry is between fans. The bands are certainly not feuding". It is an interesting fact Felipe Colombo and RBD star Anahí starred together in Mexican telenovela Ángeles sin paraíso in 1992.

== Discography ==
- Señales (2002)
- Tiempo (2003)
- Memoria (2004)
- Vuelvo (2021)

== Tours ==
- Tour Señales (2002 - 2003)
- Tour Nuestro Tiempo (2003 - 2004)
- Tour de despedida de Erreway (2004)
- Erreway: Gira de España (2006)
- Juntos Otra Vez (2025)
