= Ángeles sin paraíso =

- Genre: Children's telenovela
- Written by: Lorena Salazar; Eduardo Quiroga
- Directed by: Juan Carlos Muñoz; Manuel Ruiz Esparza
- Starring: Anahí; Felipe Colombo; Patricia Bernal; Evita Muñoz "Chachita"; Fernando Balzaretti; Eduardo Cassab; Luis de Icaza
- Opening theme: Ángeles sin paraíso by Luis Ignacio Guzmán Z.
- Country of origin: Mexico
- Original language: Spanish
- No. of episodes: 160

Production
- Executive producer: Pedro Damián
- Running time: 41-44 minutes
- Production company: Televisa

Original release
- Network: Canal de las Estrellas
- Release: June 29, 1992 – January 29, 1993

Related
- Carrusel de las Américas (17:30); La última esperanza

Ángeles sin paraíso (English title: Angels without paradise) is a Mexican Children's telenovela produced by Pedro Damián for Televisa in 1992. It is remembered by the public as one of the first children's Mexican telenovela.

Anahí and Felipe Colombo starred as child protagonists, while Patricia Bernal starred as the main antagonist.

== Cast ==
- Anahí as Claudia Cifuentes
- Felipe Colombo as Andrés Cifuentes
- Patricia Bernal as Aurora Sombría
- Evita Muñoz "Chachita" as Asunción "Mamá Chonita"
- Fernando Balzaretti as Morrongo
- Eduardo Cassab as Mustiales
- Luis de Icaza as Juan
- Josefina Echánove as Lucia
- Beatriz Moreno as Antonia "Toña" Ortíz
- Manuel Landeta as Abelardo Cifuentes
- Serrana as Martha Galicia de Cifuentes
- Carmelita González as Amalia
- Raquel Pankowsky as Brígida
- Jorge Poza as Chato
- Diego Luna as Móises
- Salvador Garcini as Zorro
- Mónika Sánchez as Andrea
- Gonzalo Sánchez as Matías
- Fabiola Falcón as Filomena
- Darío T. Pie as Urbano
- Amparo Arozamena as Martina
- Abraham Stavans as Dr. Gálvez
- Irving Montaño as Sófocles
- Juan Carlos Mendoza as Pedro
- Jesús Ochoa
- Michelle Renaud
- Angélica Vale
- Eugenio Polgovsky
