= Jake & Blake =

- Genre: Sitcom
- Created by: Cris Morena
- Starring: Benjamín Rojas
- Country of origin: Argentina
- Original language: English
- No. of seasons: 2
- No. of episodes: 51

Production
- Running time: 25 minutes and 40 seconds
- Production companies: Cris Morena Group; RGB Entertainment

Original release
- Network: Disney Channel (Latin America)
- Release: November 29, 2009 – May 17, 2010

Jake & Blake is an Argentine sitcom, starring Benjamín Rojas. It tells the story of identical twin brothers separated at birth, who after meeting change places. It was released on 29 November 2009 as a pilot episode, and officially released on 7 December on Disney Channel Latin America. It was created by Cris Morena and is produced by Cris Morena Group and RGB Entertainment. This production was filmed in Buenos Aires, Argentina entirely in English. Despite being recorded in that language, all the actors are from Argentina.

== Plot ==
Jake and Blake are identical twin brothers separated at birth who have never met. Jake is a devoted student and a great swimmer. Blake is a rich, self-centered popstar. The two boys meet after Jake runs away from his school after being suspended because he accused the principal's son of throwing paintballs, while Blake runs away to avoid going to a party. After they crash into one another, Jake saves Blake and the boys discuss their lives and great physical resemblance. They then decide to switch roles and pretend to be each other: Jake gets to live Blake's life and vice versa. The series bears a resemblance to "The Prince and the Pauper".

== Characters ==
- Blake Hill (portrayed by Benjamín Rojas) - A rich and famous singer and Jake's identical twin brother.
- Jake Valley (portrayed by Benjamín Rojas) - A bright teen living with his grandmother and Blake's identical twin brother.
- Max Hill (portrayed by Tomas Martinez Christensen) Blake's brother, whom he lives with.
- Hope (portrayed by Sofía Reca) - Jake's love interest.
- Annie (portrayed by Melanie Green) - Jake's best friend who Blake has a crush on.
- Nana (portrayed by Ana Justo) - Jake's loving grandmother and guardian.
- Buddy (portrayed by Paul Drutman) - Blake's butler.
- Paloma (portrayed by Mariela Irala) - Annie's friend.
- Alan King (portrayed by Matias Mayer) - Jake's enemy.
- Principal King (portrayed by Diego Leske) - The principal of Jake's school and Alan's father.
- Miranda (portrayed by Victoria Maurette) - Blake's manager.
- Bruce (portrayed by Diego Child) - Blake's friend and a guitarist.
- Fynk (portrayed by Fabio Aste) - Uncle of Jake and Blake, but also wants to ruin Blake's reputation.
- Slate (portrayed by Marcelo Andino) - Fynk's sidekick.

== Soundtrack ==
14 songs were written by Cris Morena and Benjamin Rojas for the show (and for previous series) and performed by Benjamin Rojas and his coworkers. All of those songs are included in the music CD.

1. This is the End
2. Eclipse of Absences
3. We'll Go to Heaven
4. To the Other End
5. Until the End
6. Stay Here With Me
7. Did it All Wrong
8. Seeking Only Love
9. It's Hard
10. All I Want Is to Be All Right
11. Without any Hope
12. In Pairs
13. Cause Today's a New Day
14. You Are So Close
15. On the map

== Episodes ==
Seasons	Episodes	First air date	Last air date
1	26	26 July 2010	December 13, 2010

The series was first shown on July 26, 2010, at 05:55pm, and was screened on Monday – Thursday at 6:55 pm on Disney Channel UK.

=== Season 1 ===
- Episode 1: Like looking in a Mirror

The story begins with a storm and Benjamin Rojas' narration: "This is the story of two guys who learn a lot about themselves, by pretending to be somebody else".

Jake Valley, a student at Kingdom High is an intelligent student and the math teacher's assistant, who was expelled for blaming the principal's son for throwing a balloon at the math teacher. Blake Hill is a famous pop star who had just finished a concert and tries to escape. Blake's helicopter breaks down and he goes by motorcycle to Agua Clara. He stumbles upon Jake without seeing and falls in a river. Jakes saves him and they are surprised to find out they look alike. Jake sneaks Blake into his house to clean up. Since Jake and Blake are going through tough moments, Blake comes up with the idea of switching lives since no one will tell the difference.

- Episode 3: Cinderella First shown: 28 July 2010 (UK)

Jake meets the car wash worker, water Hope, and falls in love. But Hope is in love with Blake. He takes her to dinner at Blake's favourite restaurant, Salt and Pepper, but he is allergic to pepper. When Blake helps at a dance at school, Alan wants revenge, taking him to the same restaurant as Jake, trying to put pepper in his fish. Slate spies on Blake (Jake), but has no idea what is going on when he starts seeing two of them. Blake's dog, Kurt, starts a fire at the restaurant, where Hope and Annie meet... Annie discovers and is involved in the rest of the series. When Slate reports to Fynk, Fynk does not believe him.

- Episode 4: Famous Unknowns First shown: 29 July 2010 (UK)

Blake has a poster in Agua Clera! Except not the best picture. When Blake becomes angry at everyone graffitiing the poster, Annie thinks it is because Jake used to watch her dance there. Jake tries to meet Hope at the mall, not realising that there are a lot of fans there. During a muddle (Jake dressing up as a woman), Slate goes to eat. Max finds out that Jake is not really Blake and so, finding out he has a date with her at home, ruins his date by bringing many fans to his room. Jake and Blake convince Max to join their "team", and so he convinces Hope to meet Jake again.

- Episode 5: Like a Fish in the Water First shown: 2 August 2010 (UK)

Jake accidentally goes to a public swimming pool to swim, causing the press to say Blake Hill can swim. And Slate said he could not. Jake stops calling Hope, mad at himself for lying to her. Kingdom College faces its rival school, Lake High, in a swimming competition. Jake is the best swimmer in the school. Blake is afraid of water. After wrecking the swimming pool with foam, the two schools start fighting. Blake makes an on-the-spot speech, which makes everyone stop. After finding out he cannot swim, Annie finds out Blake is not really Jake and storms into Blake's apartment with Jakethere and Blake right behind her.

- Episode 6: Free Kurt First shown: 3 August 2010 (UK)

Fynk puts a tracking device on Kur, to find Blake, and Blake meets him for the first time in Agua Clera, making him think Blake has a double life. Blake misses his lunch date with his grandmother. Kurt embarrasses Jake on live TV, and runs back home. Miranda is mad at him and throws him near Agua Clara, where a dog catcher catches him. Jake rescues him, along with Hope, which makes Miranda very mad.

- Episode 7: Brothers First shown: 4 August 2010 (UK)

Jake finds a picture of Blake, Max, and his mother and father. He wonders if they really are brothers, and wants to meet Blake's - possibly his - mother. Max borrows a cap from his brother. When he visits Blake, Blake does not want to look after him, and takes his cap back, causing Max to be mad at Jake, and not want Jake as his brother. Fynk pays him a visit.

Annie is going to audition for a famous dance school. So Blake offers to look after a boy called Jack Russell. After a hard day, he spots Annie and her dance partner together in her room. Thinking that they are kissing, he accidentally breaks the dancer's leg. He decides to be her dance partner, but he has a plan to fool Annie. He gets a famous dancer to be her dance partner. Slate actually thinks Blake is a ballet dancer and calls Fynk, but Blake has already left.

Realising his mistake, Blake gives the cap back, but when Max does not want it, he, Jake and Max have a food fight.

Fynk looks at old newspaper articles about the discontinued search. A couple also mention a discontinued search for twins.

Episode 8: Interscholastic Competition First shown: 5 August 2010 (UK)

Fynk wants to invest in Kingdom College, which is facing Lake High again, in a one-on-one challenge, consisting of a sack race, a rotten egg competition, a quiz and darts. Jake is usually only good at swimming and studies, so he usually loses. Blake's former coach is coaching the other school, and thinks that Jake is Blake. Alan wants Jake to lose, but when Blake gets a bullseye, he accidentally makes Lake High lose. When the coach accuses Kingdom High of winning, the two schools start fighting, again, and Blake makes an on-the-spot speech, again, and everyone stops, again. The coach thinks Blake could never make such a beautiful speech.

After Jake becomes moody, Miranda calls in Blake's personal trainer, who takes him bungee jumping to make him that admit he is afraid, which Hope is attracted to in him, too.

Fynk visits Jake's grandmother, pretending to be a teacher, who tells him that Jake was found floating in the ocean from a shipwreck. Slate thinks that someone must be blackmailing Blake because he has a double life. Fynk tells him that they are two people: twins.

- Episode 9: Girl stuff

Jake (is passed by Blake) receives a visit from a friend named Connie. Blake told him that they were very good friends but she acts as if they were engaged. Blake asks Jake to go, but he has an essay but Connie let it go. Hope is told by Miranda that Blake has a girlfriend. She does not believe it but decides to visit. Blake and Connie are hugging, so Hope leaves and in the meantime Blake receives letters from a secret admirer (believed to be Annie) but then she says she does not leave cards. Meanwhile, Jake leaves a message saying that Jake is not Blake Hill, but Jake Valley, and Max tells him to erase. In that invite Jake to sing with Connie in a program and they say there is nothing between them, Jake dedicates the song to Hope. Blake then finds out that it was Annie who left the cards and she admits, but for a mistake. In the end, Connie leaves Jake alone.

- Episode 10: Save Our Farm!!! First shown: 10 August 2010 (UK)

When Mr. King wants to sell the school farm Annie wants to save it but Jake (Blake) does not want it. Then Annie calls Blake (Jake) to come back to school. When Grandma comes to school again with Jake (Blake) they are almost caught together. The farm is saved in the end with Jake and Blake's help.

- Episode 11: Commitment First shown: 11 August 2010 (UK)
- Episode 12: Jealousy First shown: 12 August 2010 (UK)

Blake is jealous when an artist named Francesco comes into the school because he thinks Annie likes him. Blake later finds that Francesco is cheating on Annie and phones Francesco's other girlfriend to come into the school. Annie discovers Francesco's true personality and throws paint at him. This results in a paint fight, but Jake (Blake) grabs Annie's hand and they escape. Jake (Blake) says Annie must be grateful to him for showing her the truth but she simply accuses him of being the same kind of person as Francesco.

Hope starts to be jealous of all the attention Blake (Jake) is getting from his female fans.

- Episode 13: Panic

Blake (Jake) freaks out when Mr. Fink tells him that he has to perform on "The Noon Show" a live show. On the day, he loses his voice and Max was able to save him so he can perform again tonight once he recovers. Meanwhile, Annie takes Jake (Blake) to a hot spring to help him get over his fear of swimming in water.

- Episode 15: Be the Other

Jake goes to find his mother to ask her about his past but there were no plane tickets so he took a boat. It stopped working so he took a motor to get away. Blake tried to be Jake and Blake at the same time in a dance competition where he had to be the judge and a dancer. At the last moment Jake arrived at the dance competition and saved Blake from both parts.

- Episode 16: Sa lie
- Episode 18: On Mothers and Sons
- Episode 19: Happy Birthday To You

Blake finds out that he was adopted. Fynk hires an actress to pretend to be Jake and Blake's mother but she tells Slate that she does not want to lie to them and tells Jake the truth.

- Episode 20: The Perfect Family

Jake and Blake are looking for their real parents. Fynk finds some poor people to pretend to be the twins' parents in order to disgust them and stop their search.

- Episode 21: Am I.....Me?

While searching for his real parents by the marina, Blake gets pushed into the water by Slate and develops amnesia. Meanwhile, Jake is on the show "A Day in The Life Of".

- Episode 22: Call a spade a spade

Jake (Blake) does not want to run for student body president, but Annie insists that he should run with Jake's qualities - no lying, no cheating, no manipulating. Meanwhile, Blake (Jake) is shooting a commercial with shampoo that he cannot endorse because it keeps hurting him. Blake (Jake) then notices the people talking to Miranda and Bruce saying that they will not have their "piece of the action" and will be keeping a close eye on them.

- Episode 23: Confession Confused

Jake is trying to find a way to tell Hope that he is not Blake. Max suggests that he gives her a video. Mr Fynk thinks he might get him in trouble and Buddy tells Bruce to keep out of Blake's room and says the word "corruption" and thinks it will put him and Miranda in jail after admitting that they have been stealing from him and they all try hard to get it back. Meanwhile, Blake is trying to find a way into Annie's ballet performance to wish her luck. In the end, Hope finds Jake and Blake in his bedroom and she breaks up with Jake.

- Episode 24: Love of his Life

Katie is visited by a friend, so Blake and Annie try to get them closer. Buddy has a visit from her old friend, the famous singer Lori Dori, so he pretends to be rich, but Miranda tells Lori who Buddy really is. Blake and Annie almost kiss each other but Katie butts in.

- Episode 25: Best Friends

Jake, Max and Hope break into Miranda's house to find evidence that she and Bruce are stealing from Blake. Meanwhile, Blake, Anna and their old time friend, Ivan, try to win a dance competition but he keeps interrupting because he might be too close to her.

- Episode 26: Back to Being Me

Jake has to compete in a sports competition against Alan and Blake performs live and develops a tantrum against his fans. Hope resigns as his fan club president. Eventually, they have to face their problems and are able to overcome them. It soon ends in disaster after they each take a nasty fall. The episode ends with Jake and Blake in the hospital in full body casts and with Jake's saying, "From now on, you're Jake and I'm Blake".

=== Season 2 ===
- Episode 51: We're a team

With everybody on their backs, Jake and Blake must work together to give everyone their apologies. Jake goes to Mr. Fink for support, not knowing that he is also trying to put them down and Blake apologizes to Cathy who is happy to have two grandsons. Afterwards, Jake finds out that Mr. Fink is controlling the reporters and Mr. King. He soon approaches him face-to-face telling him everything he has done including his and Blake's hidden past. Mr. Fink left them to die in the shipwreck 18 years ago to take the company from their father. The police come to arrest Mr. Fink and Slate, but they escape. The next day, the government comes to the school and they arrest Mr. King and justice is served at last. Jake, Blake and friends celebrate their victory over Fink and the fans know they are sorry. As the episode concludes, the twins are considering becoming a duo.
