= Teatro Gran Rex =

Art Deco style theatre in Buenos Aires, Argentina

Coordinates: 34°36′12″S 58°22′44″W

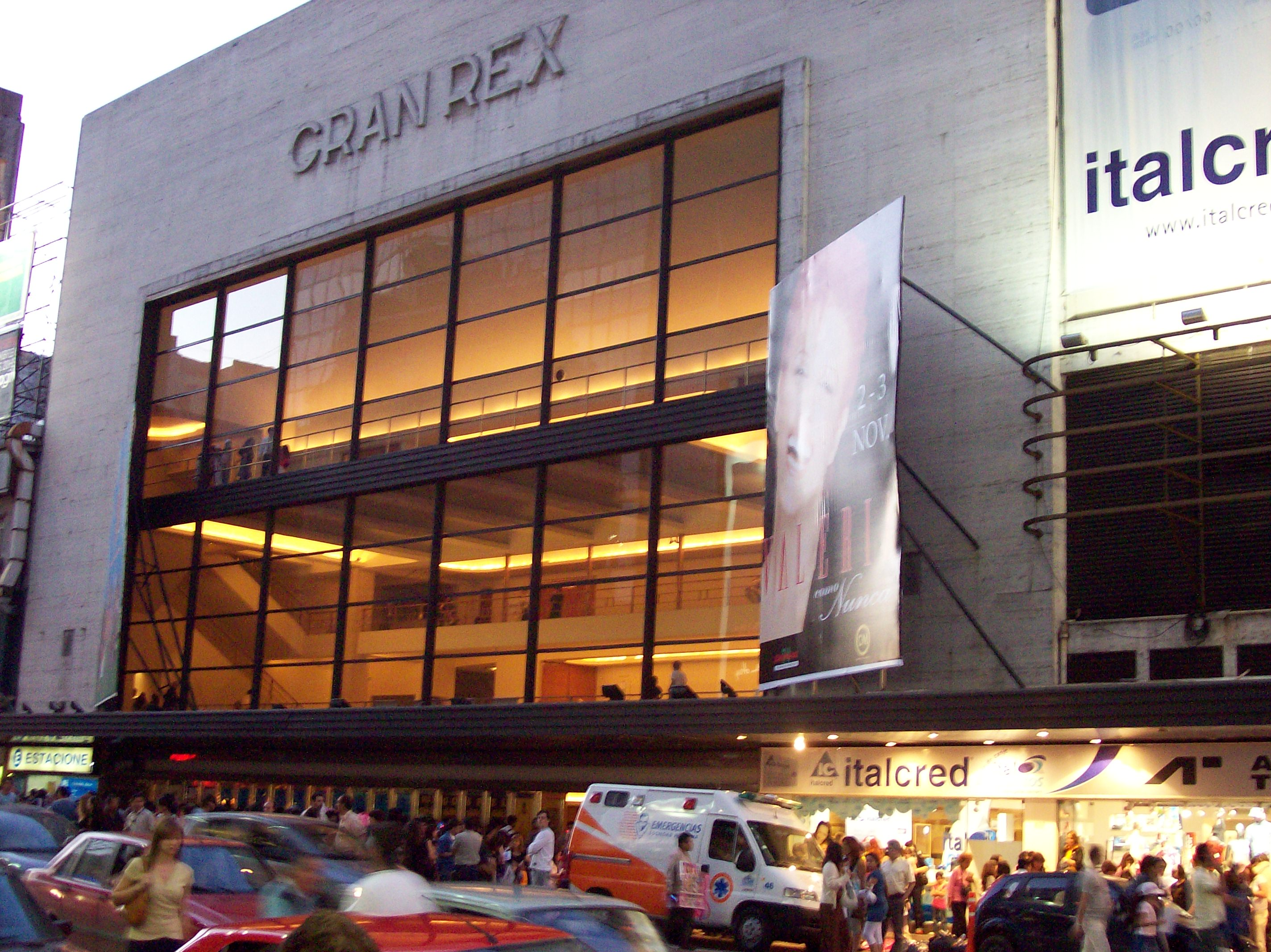
The Gran Rex

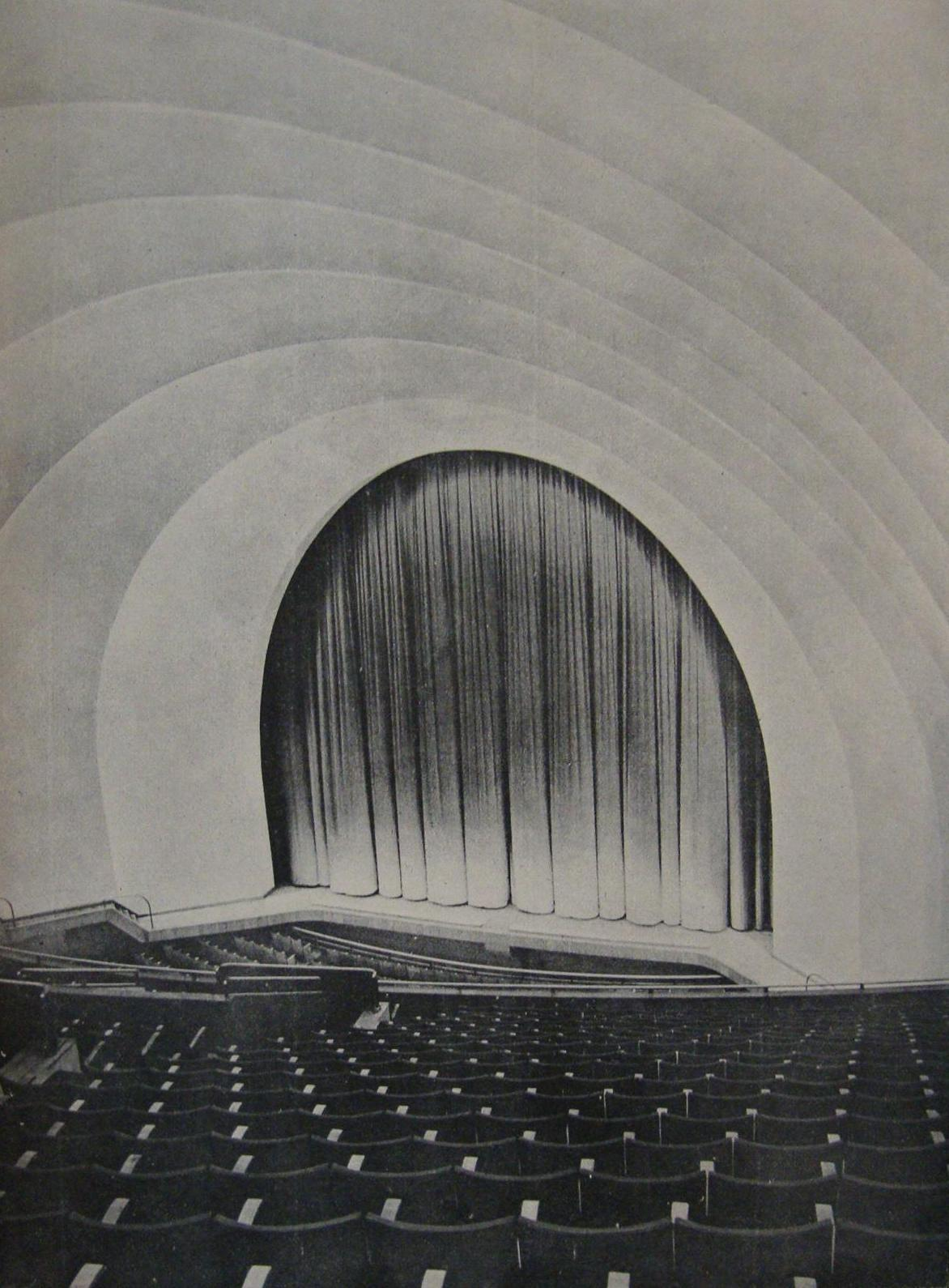
The stage in 1937.

The Teatro Gran Rex is an Art Deco style theatre in Buenos Aires, Argentina which opened on July 8, 1937, as the largest cinema in Argentina.

Located near the centre of the city at 857 Corrientes Avenue, it was designed by the architect Alberto Prebisch, who was also in charge of the construction of the Obelisk, one of the main icons of the city.

The design of the interior was influenced by that of Radio City Music Hall in New York City and construction of the theatre was completed in just seven months in association with the engineer Adolfo Moret. The opening caused a sensation and the Argentine intellectual Victoria Ocampo praised the theatre as an outstanding example of modern architecture from the pages of her influential literary journal, Sur.

Today, the theatre has 3,300 seats and, together with the Teatro Opera on the opposite side of the street, is one of the city's most important venues for the staging of international shows.

Chiquititas was the highest-grossing event in the history of the theater (Casi ángeles was the second). Based on the children-oriented soap of the same name and with the complete cast of the show, six seasons of live musicals were performed at the Gran Rex from 1996 to 2001 during the Winter Holidays. Over 1 million tickets were sold, with the 1998 season being the highest-selling season ever (and the highest attendance ever at the Gran Rex to this day): 240,000 tickets sold.

== International performers ==
- Soda Stereo
- Nubeluz
- Cocteau Twins
- Loreena McKennitt
- Paco de Lucía
- Jethro Tull
- Ron Carter
- Tony Bennett
- Lou Reed
- Eva Ayllón
- Living Colour
- Foreigner
- Bob Dylan
- Belinda Carlisle
- Matisyahu
- The Alan Parsons Project
- Herbie Hancock
- Kenny Rogers
- Def Leppard
- The Magic Numbers
- Peter Cetera
- Emerson, Lake & Palmer
- Devendra Banhart
- Charles Aznavour
- Lisa Stansfield
- Hugh Laurie
- Cat Power
- David Byrne
- Peter Frampton
- Jack Bruce
- Steve Winwood
- Maceo Parker
- Morten Harket
- Joe Satriani
- Jason Mraz
- Chris Cornell
- Steve Vai
- Regina Spektor
- Cyndi Lauper
- Dio
- Donna Summer
- Corinne Bailey Rae
- Air Supply
- Fish
- Jools Holland
- The Carl Palmer Band
- Ian Anderson
- The Raconteurs
- Roger Hodgson
- Ornette Coleman
- The Beach Boys
- KT Tunstall
- Peter Murphy
- Laura Pausini
- Nouvelle Vague
- Björk
- Rick Wakeman
- Dolores O’Riordan
- Medeski Martin and Wood
- Echo & The Bunnymen
- Alice Cooper
- Laurie Anderson
- Gloria Gaynor
- The Rapture
- Muse
- Coldplay
- Interpol
- Toto
- ASIA
- Liza Minnelli
- Caetano Veloso
- Rick Astley
- Kenny G
- Toquinho
- Marillion
- KC and the Sunshine Band
- Damon Albarn
- Pat Metheny Group
- Nat King Cole
- Olivia Newton-John
- Richard Ashcroft
- Travis
- Bryan Adams
- Europe
- Duke Ellington
- Halsey
- Dizzy Gillespie
- Sarah Vaughan
