= Erreway en Concierto =

Compilation album by Erreway
- Released: 2006 in Spain
- Recorded: 2006
- Genre: Pop, rock
- Length: 81:32 (just CD)
- Label: Warner Music Spain
- Producer: Cris Morena

Erreway chronology
| Memoria (2004) | Erreway en Concierto (2006) | Erreway presenta su caja recopilatoria (2007) |

Erreway en Concierto (Erreway in Concert) is the first compilation album by Argentine band Erreway. It was released in 2006 in Spain and had very large success there. Artists on this album included Benjamin Rojas, Felipe Colombo, Camila Bordonaba and Luisana Lopilato, but also some actors and actresses from Rebelde Way, such as Victoria Maurette and Piru Saez.

This album was produced, created and directed by Cris Morena. Music and lyrics were by Cris Morena, Silvio Furmansky, Gustavo Novello and Carlos Nilson. The compilation included tracks from Erreway's albums Señales (2002) and Tiempo (2003) and DVD.

== Track listing ==
=== Album ===
Album included songs from albums Señales and Tiempo.

1. "Rebelde Way"
2. "Bonita de Más"
3. "Te Soñé"
4. "Perder Un Amigo"
5. "Te Dejé"
6. "Vave La Pena"
7. "Sweet Baby"
8. "Aún, Ahora"
9. "Pretty Boy"
10. "Inmortal"
11. "Mi Vida"
12. "Tiempo"
13. "No Soy Así"
14. "Será Porque Te Quiero"
15. "Sweet Baby"
16. "Rebelde Way"
17. "Resistiré"

=== DVD ===
DVD included videos from Erreway's live shows.

1. "Rebelde Way"
2. "Bonita de Más"
3. "Te Soñé"
4. "Perder Un Amigo"
5. "Te Dejé"
6. "Vave La Pena"
7. "Sweet Baby"
8. "Aún, Ahora"
9. "Pretty Boy"
10. "Inmortal"
11. "Mi Vida"
12. "Tiempo"
13. "No Soy Así"
14. "We Will Rock You"
15. "Será Porque Te Quiero"
16. "Sweet Baby"
17. "Resistiré"
