= Erreway: 4 caminos =

- Directed by: Ezequiel Crupnicoff
- Written by: Cris Morena; Solange Keoleyan; Lily Ann Martin
- Produced by: Tomás Yankelevich; Natalia La Porta
- Starring: Camila Bordonaba; Felipe Colombo; Benjamín Rojas; Luisana Lopilato
- Cinematography: Miguel Abal
- Edited by: César Custodio
- Music by: Cris Morena; Diego Arancibia; Silvio Furmanski; Gustavo Novello; Diego Grimblat
- Distributed by: Buena Vista International; Cris Morena Group; RGB; Yair Dori International
- Release date: July 1, 2004 (Argentina)
- Running time: 100 minutes
- Country: Argentina
- Language: Spanish

Erreway: 4 caminos (English: Erreway: 4 Ways) it's a 2004 Argentine film and a sequel to the Argentine series Rebelde Way. The film was created to continue the story of Rebelde Way, existing as a parallel reality to the series. It was made to explore the characters' lives after finishing school and their journeys as adults striving to achieve their dreams.

== Plot ==
Set in the world of Rebelde Way; the film explores the paths the four young protagonists take as their teenage years come to an end. The group discovers that Mía is pregnant with Manuel’s child—a baby girl they name Candela, later discovering that Mía is suffering from an incurable illness. Ultimately, Erreway achieves fame and lives on through Candela; as an adult, she becomes a celebrated singer, performing Erreway’s songs in tribute to both the group and her mother.

== Cast ==
Character	Original Actor/Actress
Main Characters
Mía Colucci	Luisana Lopilato
Marizza Pía Andrade	Camila Bordonaba
Pablo Bustamante	Benjamín Rojas
Manuel Aguirre	Felipe Colombo
Benito	Roly Serrano
Candela Aguirre	Valentina Carlos (baby Candela)
Candela Aguirre	Camila Majtanksy (1 year)
Candela Aguirre	Micaela Majtanksy (1 year)
Candela Aguirre	Carla Pandolfi (21 years)
Minor Characters
Angioletti	Claudio Rissi
Vaqueano	Ricardo Lazzara
Pedro	Martin Borisenko
Receptionist	Gabriela Groppa
TV Presenter	Diego Topa
Presenter Portugues	Celio Pereira Cangosu
Seller	Darío Carrizzo
Prostitute 1	Pía Uribelarrea
Prostitute 2	Silvia Geijo
Prostitute 3	Leticia Gaspari
Transvestite	Flavio “Mosquito” Sancixeto
Man 1	Luis Alí
Man 2	León Dogorny
Man 3	Claudio Torres
Man 4	Mauricio Paulucci
Village Girl	María Figueras
Village Boy	Cristián Gutiérrez
Wife Of Ramón	Sandra Bell
Bully 1	Fernando Álvarez
Bully 2	Hernán Figueroa
Bully 3	Jorge Noya
Receptionist	Natalia Merino
Dr. Agüero	Francisco Nápoli
Hotel Concierge	Carlos Armata
Radio Announcer	Gabriel Galindez
TV Presenter	Carla Bonfante
Player 1	Eduardo Lidijover
Player 2	Juan Pascarelli
Reporter	Ana Karina
