= Memoria (album) =

Studio album by Erreway
- Released: 2004
- Recorded: 2004
- Genre: Pop; R&B; electropop; rock; pop rock
- Length: 40:27
- Label: Yair Dori International
- Producer: Cris Morena

Erreway chronology
| Tiempo (2003) | Memoria (2004) | El Disco de Rebelde Way (2006) |

Singles from Memoria
- 1. "Memoria" Released: June 1, 2004; 2. "Que Se Siente" Released: June 2004

Memoria is the third studio album by Argentine band Erreway. The songs were written by María Cristina de Giacomi and Carlos Nilson, who also wrote for the albums Señales (2002) and Tiempo (2003). The album was released in June 2004, and sold 500,000 copies just in South America. The songs "Asignatura Pendiente", "Vivo Como Vivo", "De Aquí, de Allá", "Solo Sé" and "Memoria" were used in the Erreway film Erreway: 4 caminos (2004).

== Track listing ==
1. "Memoria" (María Cristina de Giacomi, Carlos Nilson) – 4:34
2. "Solo Sé" (María Cristina de Giacomi, Carlos Nilson) – 4:22
3. "De Aquí, de Allá" (de Giacomi, Nilson) – 3:15
4. "Asignatura Pendiente" (de Giacomi, Nilson) – 4:00
5. "No Hay Que Llorar" (de Giacomi, Nilson) – 3:38
6. "Dame" (de Giacomi, Nilson) – 4:07
7. "Bandera Blanca" (de Giacomi, Nilson) – 3:31
8. "Mañana Habrá" (de Giacomi, Nilson) – 3:14
9. "Vivo Como Vivo" (de Giacomi, Nilson) – 3:19
10. "Perdiendo, Ganando" (de Giacomi, Nilson) – 3:22
11. "Que Se Siente" (de Giacomi, Nilson) – 4:25

== Personnel ==
- Benjamín Rojas – vocals
- Camila Bordonaba – vocals
- Felipe Colombo – vocals
- Luisana Lopilato – vocals
