= Tiempo (album) =

Studio album by Erreway
- Released: 15 April 2003
- Recorded: 2002–2003
- Genres: Pop rock, rock, pop
- Length: 43:33
- Label: Sony Music/Cris Morena Group
- Producer: Cris Morena

Erreway chronology
Señales (2002)	Tiempo (2003)	Memoria (2004)

Singles from Tiempo
- 1. "Te Soñé"; 2. "Tiempo"; 3. "Será de Dios"; 4. "Para Cosas Buenas"; 5. "Que Estés"; 6. "Vas a Salvarte"

Tiempo (Spanish: Time) is the second studio album by Argentine pop rock band Erreway. It was released through Sony Music and Cris Morena Group on 15 April 2003. The album was produced by a number of eminent Argentine musicians, including Cris Morena, Carlos Nilson and Andrés Calamaro. It reached number on the Argentine albums chart and was certified Platinum by CAPIF, the Argentine Phonographic Association.

Erreway members — Camila Bordonaba, Felipe Colombo, Luisana Lopilato and Benjamín Rojas — made a successful Nuestro Tiempo tour to promote the album. Although "Te Soñé" had been released as a single in 2002, before the release of the album, "Tiempo" was released as the lead single. "Será de Dios", "Para Cosas Buenas", "Que Estés" and "Vas A Salvarte" were also released as singles.

== Track list ==
1. "Tiempo" (Cris Morena, Carlos Nilson) — 4:06
2. "Será de Dios" (Cris Morena, Silvio Furmansky) — 3:55
3. "Para Cosas Buenas" (Cris Morena, Carlos Nilson) — 3:10
4. "Dije Adiós" (Cris Morena, Silvio Furmansky) — 4:09
5. "Me Da Igual" (Cris Morena, Carlos Nilson) — 3:28
6. "Que Estés" (Cris Morena, Carlos Nilson) —3:29
7. "No Estés Seguro" (Cris Morena, Carlos Nilson) — 3:13
8. "No Se Puede Más" (Cris Morena, Carlos Nilson) — 3:40
9. "Te Soñé" (Cris Morena, Carlos Nilson) — 3:00
10. "Invento" (Cris Morena, Carlos Nilson) — 3:41
11. "Vas a Salvarte" (Cris Morena, Carlos Nilson) — 3:18
12. "Vamos Al Ruedo" (Andrés Calamaro) — 3:43

== Personnel ==
- Erreway
  - Camila Bordonaba — vocals
  - Felipe Colombo — vocals, guitar
  - Luisana Lopilato — vocals
  - Benjamín Rojas — vocals
- Rebelde Way cast — backing vocals
- María Cristina de Giácomi, Carlos Nilson, Silvio Furmansky, Andrés Calamaro — producing, composing and songwriting
- Gustavo Novello, Cachorro López — producing

== Chart positions and certifications ==
Chart	Peak	Certification
Argentine Billboard Albums Chart	1	Platinum (CAPIF)
Greek Billboard Albums Chart	4	-
