= Benjamín Rojas =

Argentine actor and singer (born 1985)

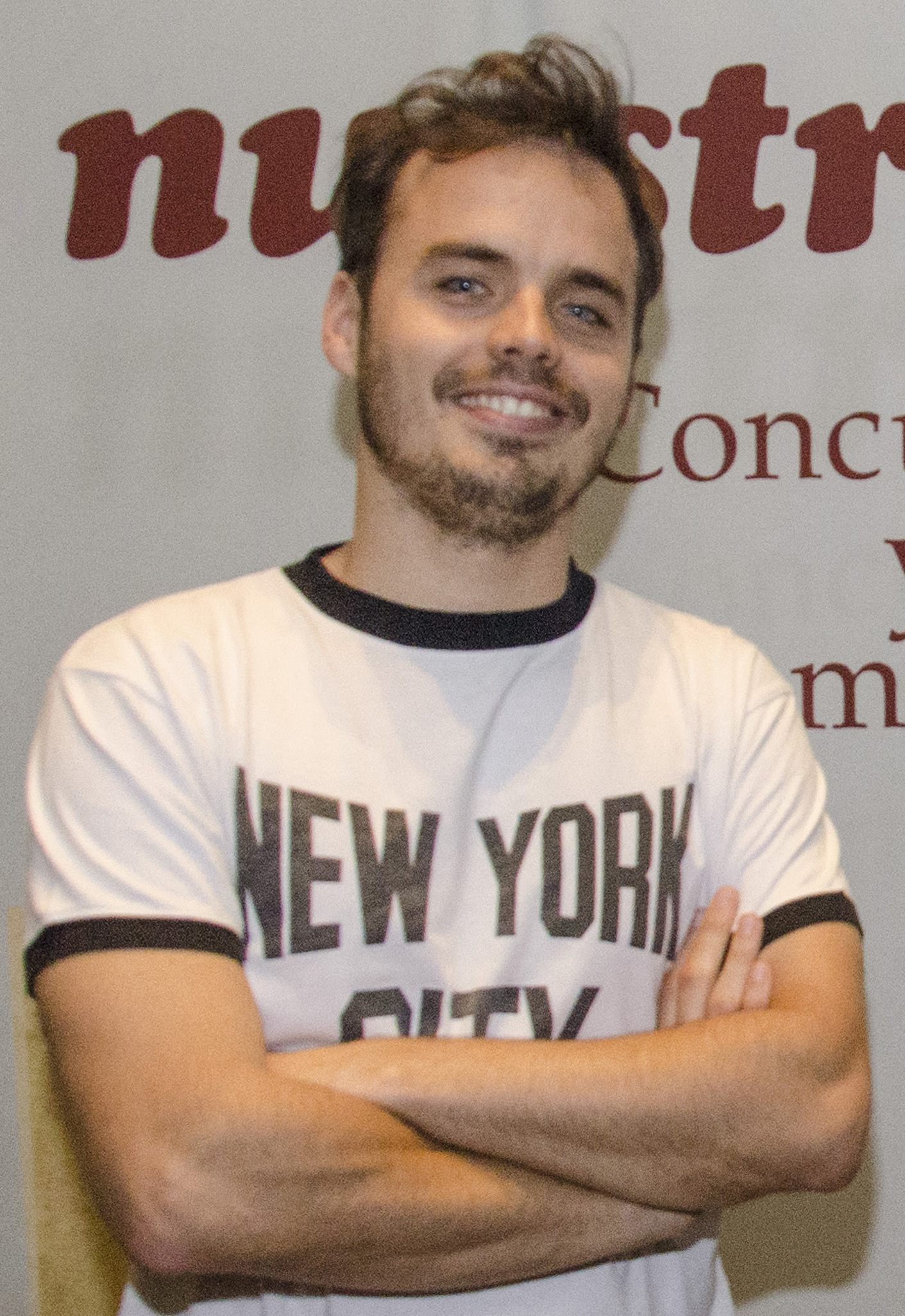
- Rojas in 2015
- Born: Benjamín Rojas Pessi; April 16, 1985 (age 41); La Plata, Argentina
- Occupations: Actor; singer; songwriter
- Years active: 1998–present
- Partner: Martina Sánchez Acosta (2011–present)
- Children: 1
- Website: benja-rojas.ya.st

Benjamín Rojas Pessi (Note: In this Spanish name, the first or paternal surname is Rojas and the second or maternal family name is Pessi.) (born April 16, 1985) is an Argentine actor and singer. He was part of the pop-rock band Erreway together with Camila Bordonaba, Felipe Colombo and Luisana Lopilato.

== Acting career ==
=== Breakthrough (1998–2003) ===
Rojas was born in La Plata, and began his professional acting career in 1998, when he was 12 years old: he was cast as Yago in Cris Morena's production, Chiquititas. His portrayed a Tarzan–like boy who helped Jimena, played by María Jimena Piccolo, to get out of a jungle. In turn Jimena took him to the Rincón de Luz orphanage. In 1999, for its fifth season, Chiquititas got a complete makeover and renewed its story completely. Rojas continued on the show but playing a new character, Bautista Arce. He reprised the role in Chiquititas feature film Chiquititas: Rincón de Luz.

In 2002, he renewed his contract with the Cris Morena Group and was cast for the role of Pablo Bustamante in the Martín Fierro Award—nominated hit television series Rebelde Way. Along with former Chiquititas fellows Camila Bordonaba, Felipe Colombo and Luisana Lopilato, he formed a music band, named Erreway, which sold more than 10 million compact disc units worldwide. In 2004, Rojas reprised his role of Pablo Bustamante in Erreway: 4 Caminos, a Rebelde Way spin–off film.

=== Stardom (2004–present) ===
In 2004, Rojas starred in the El Trece series Floricienta, his third consecutive project with the Cris Morena Group in the span of seven years. He starred the series as Franco Fritzenwalden for two seasons, alongside Florencia Bertotti and Juan Gil Navarro. Rojas also reprised his character in the theatre version of Floricienta. In 2006, he once again worked with Cris Morena on television series Alma Pirata, opposite Luisana Lopilato, Mariano Martínez and Elsa Pinilla. Rojas also recorded several songs for Alma Pirata soundtrack album.

Throughout 2007 and 2009, Rojas had several guest appearances in the television series Casi Ángeles. In 2008, he appeared in two films, Kluge alongside Alejandro Awada, and La leyenda alongside Pablo Rago. These were his first projects done independently from the Cris Morena Group. In 2008, Rojas signed a contract with the Cris Morena Group and the Disney Channel Latin America for a new television sitcom, Jake & Blake, his first project in English. The series, based on the story of The Prince and the Pauper, went on to reach a worldwide success. Rojas signed up for two television series in 2011, Venezuelan series Amigos y Rivales and Argentine series Cuando me sonreís, opposite Facundo Arana and Mariana Espósito.

== Musical career ==
During the development of Rebelde Way, Rojas and his co-stars: Luisana Lopilato, Felipe Colombo and Camila Bordonaba have become the members of the band Erreway. They immediately reached worldwide popularity, especially in Latin America, Spain, Europe and Israel. All their studio albums, Señales (2002), Tiempo (2003) and Memoria, reached Platinum certification. The band was partially inactive from 2005 to 2007, when they reunited as a trio, without Lopilato. They released Erreway presenta su caja recopilatoria, the greatest hits compilation, in 2007, and a new album Vuelvo was announced. However, Vuelvo has never been released. In 2010, Bordonaba and Colombo began their independent musical project, La Miss Tijuana, marking the final split of Erreway.

Rojas has recorded several soundtrack albums for his television series. This includes five Chiquititas soundtrack albums, released from 1998 to 2001. He also had songs in the Floricienta soundtrack album. Rojas also recorded a soundtrack album for Alma Pirata in 2006 and appeared in 2007 soundtrack album of Casi Ángeles. In 2010, Rojas released the soundtrack album for his television series Jake & Blake.

== Personal and media life ==
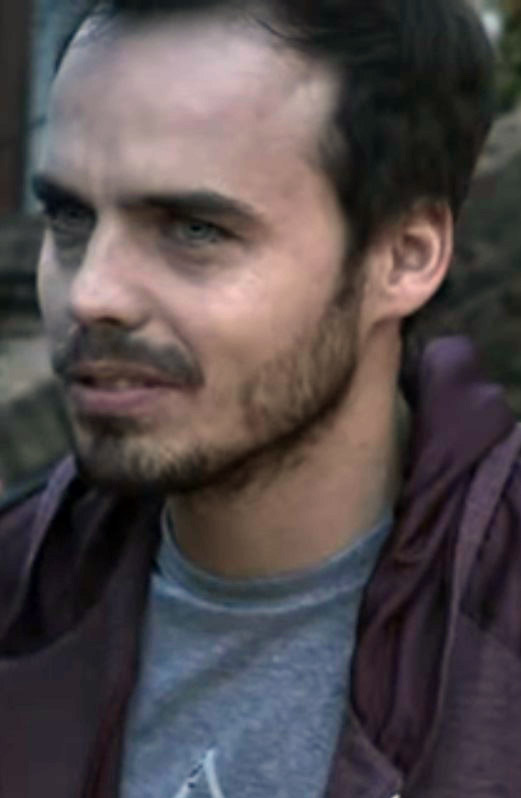
Rojas in 2017

Rojas was born in La Plata, as the youngest of four children of Juan Carlos Rojas and Rosalinda Pessi. He has two brothers, Carlos María and Juan Luis, and a sister, Milagros. Rojas attended the Gimnasia La Plata and played for its rugby team. However, he quit his sports career due to his role in Chiquititas. Rojas is a fan of football soccer and a passionate supporter of Club de Gimnasia y Esgrima La Plata. He is fluent in Spanish and English, which he studied for six months in New York City as the preparation for the television series Jake & Blake, which was shot in English.

In 1998, Benjamín Rojas was in a relationship with his co-star the actress, Camila Bordonaba at the time they were both cast for Chiquititas and Rebelde Way.

From 2005 to 2008, Benjamín Rojas was in a relationship with the actress and model, María Del Cerro with whom he was engaged.

Since 2011, Benjamín Rojas has been in a relationship with Martina Sánchez Acosta, a television producer. On December 21, 2018, the couple's first child was born; a girl they named Rita.

== Filmography ==
=== Television ===
Year	Title	Character	Channel
1998	Chiquititas	Yago	Telefe
1999–2001	Chiquititas	Bautista Arce	Telefe
2002–2003	Rebelde Way	Pablo Bustamante	Canal 9 / América TV
2003	Rincón de Luz	Himself with the Erreway group	Canal 9
2004–2005	Floricienta	Franco Fritzenwalden	Canal 13
2006	Alma Pirata	Cruz Navarro	Telefe
2007	Casi Ángeles	Himself	Telefe
2009	Casi Ángeles	Cacho de Buenos Aires	Telefe
2009–2010	Jake & Blake	Jake Valley / Blake Hill	Disney Channel
2011	Cuando me sonreís	Juan Segundo Murfy	Telefe
2011	Atrapados	Gonzalo	Yups Channel
2012–2013	Lynch	Hacker	Moviecity
2013	Solamente vos	Federico	Canal 13
2014	Mis amigos de siempre	Maximiliano "Maxi" Barraco	Canal 13
2018	Rizhoma Hotel	Lalo	Telefe
2018–2019	Mi hermano es un clon	Ignacio "Nacho" Carmona	Canal 13
2022	El fin del amor		Amazon Prime Video
2022	Dos 20	Pedro	TV Pública
2024–2026	Margarita	Franco Fritzenwalden	Max

=== Theater ===
Year	Title	Character	Director	Theater
1998	Chiquititas	Yago	Cris Morena	Teatro Gran Rex
1999–2001	Chiquititas	Bautista Arce	Cris Morena	Teatro Gran Rex
2002	Rebelde Way	Pablo Bustamante	Cris Morena	Teatro Gran Rex
2002–2007	Erreway	Himself	Cris Morena	
2004–2005	Floricienta	Franco Fritzenwalden	Cris Morena	Teatro Gran Rex
2006	Floricienta, el tour de los sueños	Franco Fritzenwalden	Cris Morena	
2007	Floricienta, el tour de los sueños en México	Franco Fritzenwalden	Cris Morena	
2012	Juicio justo	Judge		La Clac
2014	Al final del arco iris	Anthony	Ricky Pashkus	Teatro Apolo
2015–2017	El otro lado de la cama	Pedro	Emilio Martínez-Lázaro	Teatro Apolo
2018	Se alquila	Himself	Alfonso Burgos	Teatro Buenos Aires
2019–2022	Una semana nada más	Martín	Mariano Demaría	Teatro El Nacional Sancor Seguros

=== Movies ===
Year	Movie	Character	Director
2001	Chiquititas: Rincón de luz	Bautista Arce	José Luis Massa
2004	Erreway: 4 caminos	Pablo Bustamante	Ezequiel Crupnicoff
2007	Kluge	Lautaro	Luis Barone
2008	La leyenda	Lucas Vallejos	Sebastián Pivotto
2009	Horizontal vertical	Juan	Nicolás Tuozzo
2011	El abismo, todavía estamos	Mateo	Gustavo Adrián Garzón
2013	La noche del Chihuahua	Juan	Guillermo Grillo
2016	En busca del muñeco perdido		Facundo Baigorri and Hernán Biasotti
2017	Ojalá vivas tiempos interesantes		Santiago Van Dam
2018	Eso que nos enamora	Ariel	Federico Mordkowicz

== Discography ==
=== Soundtrack albums ===
- 1998 — Chiquititas Vol. 4
- 1999 — Chiquititas Vol. 5
- 2000 — Chiquititas Vol. 6
- 2001 — Chiquititas Vol. 7
- 2001 — Chiquititas: Rincón de Luz
- 2004 — Floricienta
- 2005 — Floricienta
- 2007 — Floricienta
- 2006 — Alma Pirata
- 2010 — Jake & Blake

=== Erreway ===
- 2002 — Señales
- 2002 — Erreway en Grand Rex
- 2003 — Tiempo
- 2003 — Nuestro Tiempo
- 2004 — Nuestro Tiempo
- 2004 — Memoria
- 2004 — Gira 2004
- 2006 — El Disco de Rebelde Way
- 2006 — Erreway en Concierto
- 2007 — Erreway presenta su caja recopilatoria
- 2007 — Erreway en España
- 2020 — Vuelvo

=== Roco ===
- 2013 — Pasarán años
- 2013 — Como baila la novia
- 2013 — Gira
- 2013 — Quien se ha tomado todo el vino
- 2013 — Tornado

=== Singles ===
- 2017 — Polarizado

== Awards and nominations ==
Year	Award	Category	Work	Result
2013	Kids Choice Awards Argentina	Favorite Supporting Actor	Solamente vos	Nominated
2017	Estrella de Mar Awards	Supporting Actor	El otro lado de la cama	Winner
2022	Estrella de Mar Awards	Supporting Actor	Una semana nada mas	Winner
