= Felipe Colombo =

Mexican singer-songwriter and actor

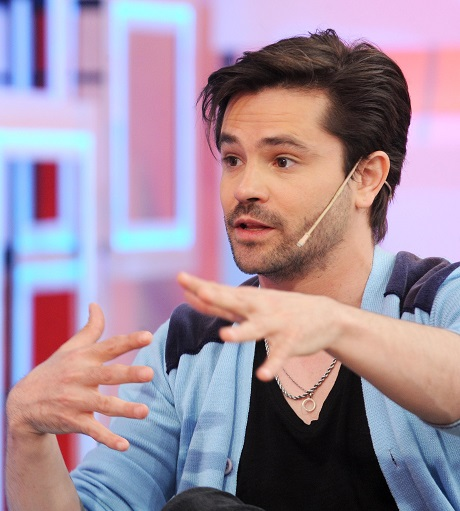
- Colombo in 2016.
- Born: Felipe Colombo Eguía; January 8, 1983 (age 43); Mexico City, Mexico
- Occupations: Actor; singer; songwriter
- Years active: 1989–present
- Height: 1.68 m (5 ft 6 in)
- Partners: Luisana Lopilato (2002–2004); Cecilia Bonelli (2005–2006); Cecilia Coronado (2007–present)
- Children: 1
- Parents: Juan Carlos Colombo; Patricia Eguía
- Relatives: Sol Colombo Eguía (sister)

Felipe Colombo Eguía (born January 8, 1983, in Mexico City, Mexico) is a Mexican and Argentine actor, singer and songwriter. He was part of the pop-rock band Erreway together with Camila Bordonaba, Benjamín Rojas and Luisana Lopilato.

== Biography ==
Felipe Colombo Eguía was born on January 8, 1983, in Hospital Angeles Mexico. He is the son of Argentine actor Juan Carlos Colombo and Mexican actress Patricia Eguía. He was raised in Mexico City, Mexico. He has an older sister called Sol. Felipe studied primary school at Escuela Hermino Almendro. Colombo started high school at CIE Sur in Mexico and finished his education in Argentina at José Martí and San Francisco schools.

== Career ==
=== Acting career ===
Colombo made his television debut in the 1992 Televisa soap opera El abuelo y yo, co-starring Ludwika Paleta and Gael García Bernal, and made his film debut the same year with a performance in Sonata de luna.

Colombo then co-starred with Angélica María in the 1994 soap opera Agujetas de color de rosa, which was successful across Latin America and especially among Hispanic audiences in the United States. He appeared as Carlitos in the 1995 film Cilantro y perejil (Cilantro & Parsley), and in 1996 had a role in an episode of Mujer, casos de la vida real, a show hosted by legendary Mexican actress Silvia Pinal. In 1999 he acted alongside Anahí in the 1999 tele-novela Ángeles sin paraíso.

=== Chiquititas México (1998) ===
In 1998 Colombo captured the role of Julio in the Mexican version of Chiquititas, originally an Argentine production.

=== Chiquititas (1999–2001) ===
After the Mexican version flopped, Chiquititas author Cris Morena decided to give him a role in the original version, where he soon became one of the most popular actors. While performing in Chiquititas, Colombo worked for the first time alongside Benjamín Rojas, Luisana Lopilato and Camila Bordonaba, which would later on become part of another one of Colombo's highlights of his career as an entertainer. In 2001, Colombo reprised his character inChiquititas' for the big screen version, Chiquititas: Rincón de luz.

=== Rebelde Way and Erreway (2002–2007) ===
Colombo secured the role of Manuel Aguirre in Rebelde Way in 2002. The show was nominated for the 2002 Martín Fierro Award for Best Telenovela. He starred alongside Benjamín Rojas, Luisana Lopilato and Camila Bordonaba. The four had previously worked together in Chiquititas and went on to form the band Erreway.

The band released three hit albums — Señales in 2002, Tiempo in 2003 and Memoria in 2004, had three successful tours Erreway en Grand Rex, Nuestro Tiempo and Gira 2004 and released a film in 2004, 4 Caminos. The film was based on their Rebelde Way characters: Manuel, Pablo, Mía and Marizza. The band split up soon after the release of their film and final album.

However, Camila Bordonaba, Benjamín Rojas and Felipe Colombo reunited in 2006 and released the compilation of the greatest hits, El Disco de Rebelde Way. Colombo and Bordonaba visited Spain during the promotional tour of the compilation. In 2007 Lopilato left Erreway, and the remaining three released a live hits collection Erreway presenta su caja recopilatoria, held a short tour in Spain, and confirmed the release of the band's fourth album, Vuelvo.

=== 2004–present ===
After his acclaimed role in Rebelde Way, Colombo appeared as Miki in another production of Cris Morena, the 2004—2005 telenovela Floricienta. He also got a lot of attention playing the lead in the theatrical version of The Graduate, alongside Nacha Guevara. In 2006, Colombo portrayed deceased Nirvana frontman Kurt Cobain in the stage play No te preocupes ojos azules. He also portrayed Pastor in 2006 hit television drama Doble Vida and appeared in one episode of Amor Mío.

In 2007 Colombo captured the role of Lucho Fierro on Martín Fierro Awards—nominated television comedy Son de Fierro. He worked alongside Camila Bordonaba for the sixth time in his career. He was seen in two films in 2008 Fantasma de Buenos Aires and Solos en la ciudad, alongside his Rebelde Way co-star Sabrina Garciarena.

In 2011–2012, his role is Bernardo Berlanga in Herederos de una venganza and 2012 he made Host TV debut in La vuelta al mundo together with the actress Isabel Macedo.

In 2013, he was part of the miniseries Inconsistente colectivo.

In 2014, he returned to television to play Fidel in Mis amigos de siempre.

In 2016, he starred in the play Cardenio.

=== Musical career ===
During the development of Rebelde Way, Felipe Colombo and his co-stars: Luisana Lopilato, Benjamín Rojas and Camila Bordonaba have become the members of the band Erreway. They immediately reached worldwide popularity, especially in Latin America, Spain, Europe and Israel. All their studio albums, Señales (2002), Tiempo (2003) and Memoria, reached Platinum certification. The band broke up at the end of 2004 and reunited again in 2006 except Luisana Lopilato to tour Spain. In 2007, they did a concert in Valencia for Sunny Happy Day and received the Platinum Record for the 80,000 copies sold of his album Erreway, el disco de Rebelde way. In 2010, he formed a new band, La Miss Tijuana with his friend Camila Bordonaba and Erreway's vocal coach, Willie Lorenzo. In 2013, he formed a new band, Roco with his friend Benjamín Rojas and Erreway's vocal coach, Willie Lorenzo.

== Personal life ==
From 2000 to 2004, Felipe Colombo was in a relationship with his co–star, the actress Luisana Lopilato.

From 2005 to 2006, Felipe Colombo was in a relationship with the model Cecilia Bonelli.

Since 2007, Felipe Colombo has been in a relationship with Cecilia Coronado, a costume designer whom he met in the recordings of Son de Fierro. On November 3, 2009, the couple's first child, a girl, was born, named Aurora Colombo. Felipe has a very close relationship with his former colleagues from Erreway, Camila Bordonaba and Benjamín Rojas who are also his daughter's godparents.

== Filmography ==
=== Theater ===
Year	Title	Character	Director	Theater
1989	Entre todos si se puede			
	El abuelo y yo	Felipín		
	Momo			
	Eduardo II			
	Los ladrones del tiempo			
1992	Ángeles sin paraíso	Andrés Cifuentes		
1999–2001	Chiquititas	Felipe Mejía	Cris Morena	Teatro Gran Rex
2002	Rebelde Way	Manuel Aguirre	Cris Morena	Teatro Gran Rex
2002–2007	Erreway	Himself	Cris Morena	
2005	El graduado	Benjamín Braddock	Felipe Fernández del Paso	Teatro Metropolitan Sura
2006	No te preocupes ojos azules	Kurt Cobain	Manuel Ibáñez	Ciudad Cultural Konex
2008	Yepeto			
2009	El alivio			
2010	No confíes en mí	Marcos		
2011–2012	Noches de reyes	Sebastián	Jorge Azurmendi	Teatro El Cubo
2012	La mujer del domingo	Brain	Daniel Suárez Marzal	Teatro Apolo
2014	La nota mágica			
2018	Desesperados			
2019-2021	Sex, viví tu experiencia		José María Muscari and Matías Napp	Gorriti Art Center

=== Television ===
Year	Title	Character	Channel	Notes
1991–1992	El abuelo y yo	Felipín	Las Estrellas	
1992–1993	Ángeles sin paraíso	Andrés Cifuentes	Las Estrellas	
1994–1995	Agujetas de color de rosa	Luisito Dávila	Televisa	
1996	Mujer, casos de la vida real	Boy	Televisa	
1998	Chiquititas	Julián Álvarez Pacheco	Azteca 7	
1999–2001	Chiquititas	Felipe Mejía	Telefe	
2002–2003	Rebelde Way	Manuel Aguirre	Canal 9/América TV	
2003	Rincón de Luz	Himself with the Erreway group	Canal 9	
2004	Floricienta	Miguel "Micky" Rojas Guerra	Canal 13	
2005	Doble vida	Pastor Saravia	América TV	
2005	Amor mío	Ignacio "Nachito" Fuentes	Televisa	
2006	Mujeres asesinas	Daniel	Canal 13	"Episode 13: Isabel, enfermera"
2006	Mujeres asesinas	Leo	Canal 13	"Episode 13: Carmen, honrada"
2007–2008	Son de Fierro	Luis "Lucho" Fierro	Canal 13	
2008–2009	Por amor a vos	Facundo Agüero	Canal 13	
2009	Enseñame a vivir	Cristóbal Amadeo Linares	Canal 13	
2011–2012	Herederos de una venganza	Bernardo Berlanga	Canal 13	
2012–2013	Sos mi hombre	Máximo Duarte	Canal 13	
2013	Inconsciente colectivo	Álvaro Goldstein	TV Pública	
2013–2014	Mis amigos de siempre	Fidel Ríos	Canal 13	
2017	En viaje	Fito	360TV	"Episode 3: Amigos con derechos"
2018	Encerrados	Juan Manuel	TV Pública	"Episode 13: Bonsái"
2018	Rizhoma Hotel	Peter	Telefe	"Episode 21: Pasión de hombres"
2018–2019	Mi hermano es un clon	Luciano	Canal 13	
2019	Millennials	Leonardo Heredia	Net TV	
2021	Días de gallos	Timo	HBO Max	"Episode 8: Bronca"
2021-2022	La 1-5/18	Ricardo "Ricky" Pelloni	Canal 13	

=== Movies ===
Year	Movie	Character	Director
1995	Cilantro y perejil	Carlitos	Rafael Montero
1998	El paje	Nicolás	Eduardo Soto-Falcón
2001	Chiquititas: Rincón de luz	Felipe Mejía	José Luis Massa
2004	Erreway: 4 caminos	Manuel Aguirre	Ezequiel Crupnicoff
2006	Cara de queso	Gustavo	Ariel Winograd
2007	Cañitas	Emmanuel	Julio César Estrada
2008	Fantasma de Buenos Aires		Guillermo Grillo
2009	Carmilla		
2010	Matar a Videla	Dante	Nicolás Capelli
2011	Solos en la ciudad	Santiago	Diego Corsini

=== Television programs ===
Year	Program	Channel	Notes
1999–2000	Sábado Bus	Telefe	Guest
1999–2001	Videomatch	Telefe	Guest
1999–2001	Susana Gimenéz	Telefe	Guest
2000–2001	Almorzando con Mirtha Legrand	Canal 13	Guest
2001	Maru a la tarde	Telefe	Guest
2002	Videomatch	Telefe	Guest
2003	Intrusos	América TV	Guest
2003	Almorzando con Mirtha Legrand	América TV	Guest
2003	Media Mañana	Canal 9	Guest
2004	Videomatch	Telefe	Guest
2012	La vuelta al mundo	Canal 13	Host
2012	Antes que sea Tarde	América TV	Guest
2013	Pura Química	ESPN+	Guest
2013	AM, antes del mediodía	Telefe	Guest
2013	Fans en Vivo	FWTV	Guest
2014	Gracias por venir, gracias por estar	Telefe	Guest
2015	Tu cara me suena (Season 3)	Telefe	Participant
2016	Cómo anillo al dedo	Canal 13	Participant
2017	Fans en Vivo	FWTV	Guest
2017	Pampita Online	KZO	Guest
2019	Cortá por Lozano	Telefe	Guest
2019	Bailando 2019	Canal 13	Participant
2019	Pasapalabra	Canal 13	Guest
2019	Almorzando con Mirtha Legrand	Canal 13	Guest
2020	El muro infernal	Telefe	Participant
2020	Pasapalabra	Canal 13	Guest
2020	Pampita Online	Net TV	Guest

== Discography ==
=== Soundtrack albums ===
- 1999 — Chiquititas Vol. 5
- 2000 — Chiquititas Vol. 6
- 2001 — Chiquititas Vol. 7
- 2001 — Chiquititas: Rincón de Luz

=== Erreway ===
- 2002 — Señales
- 2002 — Erreway en Grand Rex
- 2003 — Tiempo
- 2003 — Nuestro Tiempo
- 2004 — Nuestro Tiempo
- 2004 — Memoria
- 2004 — Gira 2004
- 2006 — El Disco de Rebelde Way
- 2006 — Erreway en Concierto
- 2007 — Erreway presenta su caja recopilatoria
- 2007 — Erreway en España
- 2020 — Vuelvo

=== La Miss Tijuana ===
- 2010 — Sólo Me Salva Amar
- 2010 — Vuelvo
- 2011 — Deja que llueva
- 2011 — 3 iguanas

=== Roco ===
- 2013 — Pasarán años
- 2013 — Como baila la novia
- 2013 — Gira
- 2013 — Quien se ha tomado todo el vino
- 2013 — Tornado
