= Camila Bordonaba =

Argentine former actress and singer-songwriter

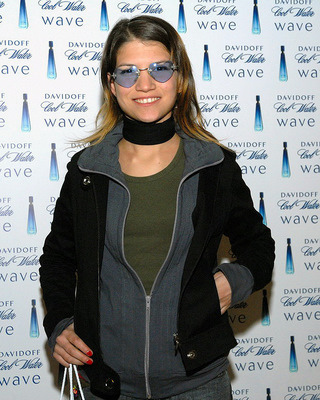
- Bordonaba in 2007
- Born: Camila Bordonaba Roldán; September 4, 1984 (age 42); El Palomar, Buenos Aires, Argentina
- Occupations: Actress; singer; songwriter; model; theatre director; spokesperson
- Years active: 1987–2012; 2025–present
- Height: 1.63 m (5 ft 4 in)
- Parents: Juan Carlos Bordonaba; Nora Roldán
- Relatives: Rodrigo (brother); Melina (sister)

Camila Bordonaba Roldán (born September 4, 1984) is an Argentine actress, singer and theater director. She is known for her performances in the series Chiquititas, Rebelde Way, Floricienta, El Patrón de la Vereda, Atracción x4 and for having been part of the pop-rock band Erreway along with Felipe Colombo, Benjamín Rojas and Luisana Lopilato.

== Biography ==
Camila was born on September 4, 1984, in El Palomar, Buenos Aires province. Her father Juan Carlos Bordonaba is a grocer and her mother Nora Roldán is a podiatrist. She has two older siblings, Melina and Rodrigo.

== Career ==
In 1987 she made her television debut when she was only three years old in the musical program Canta Niño, joining the cast with her older sister, Melina.

She sang in "La banda de Canta Niño" and also sang some songs as a soloist, such as "Señora Vaca" with which she did the casting, "Será como la mamá guevo y papá", "Somos el mundo" (Spanish version of "We Are the World" by Michael Jackson), the original in English, «Estrelinha» in Portuguese and «Pubbli-pubbli-pubblicità» and «La Ciribiricoccola», both in Italian with her sister. At age eight she began studying acting. She previously practiced rhythmic gymnastics and participated in competitions. At twelve she began her career as an actress in the children's telenovela Chiquititas, created and produced by Cris Morena, with Nadia Di Cello being the actresses who lasted the longest in the cast. She participated from 1996 to 2001 in the theatrical seasons of it. In 2001 she filmed her first film called Chiquititas: Rincón de luz starring Romina Yan and Facundo Arana. In 2002 and 2003, she starred alongside Benjamín Rojas, Luisana Lopilato and Felipe Colombo in the Rebelde Way series, a fiction for adolescents created and produced by Cris Morena. At the same time, she joined the musical band named Erreway, along with her co-stars, and published the first album Señales. With the success of the series and the band begins the "Señales Tour" presenting the songs of the album throughout Argentina, along with the more than fifteen musical performances of Rebelde Way, el show, which includes the final concert, carried out at the Gran Rex theater in Buenos Aires. In 2003 Erreway released his second album entitled Tiempo and started the "Nuestro Tiempo" tour. She traveled to Israel, giving eighteen concerts at the Nokia Sport Center Stadium in Tel Aviv, along with the cast of the series.

In 2004, she shot her second movie called Erreway: 4 caminos. This is accompanied by the publication of Erreway's latest album entitled Memoria, which includes all the themes of the film. Presenting the album, Erreway gives his last tour and the group splits to embark on new projects of their own. That same year she participates as a villain in the series Floricienta where she appears in the role of Paloma/Julieta Mónaco. In 2005, she obtained the first adult leading role of her, as Sisí Ponte, along with the actor Gustavo Bermúdez in the telenovela El Patrón de la Vereda. She performed the theme song for it. She also makes a guest appearance on the series ¿Quién es el jefe? as a judge. In 2006, she was part of the cast of Gladiadores de Pompeya broadcast by Canal 9. That year, after the success of the Rebelde Way series in Spain, broadcast since 2004 on several channels, the "Erreway Fever" returns. Two new albums are released, a compilation called The Rebelde Way album and a live one, Erreway In Concert. After the success in sales, the albums "Señales" and "Tiempo" were published in Spain. In July Felipe Colombo and Camila travel to Spain to represent Erreway with various record companies and press conferences. In December they met again, this time without Luisana Lopilato, for the "European Tour", with concerts in several Spanish cities and all tickets sold out. In 2007, in Spain, Luisana Lopilato, was chosen "The beautiful young international actress" (she won among actresses such as Jessica Alba, Scarlett Johansson, Jessica Biel and others). That same year the telecomedy Son de Fierro was released on Channel 13, where she plays the partner of Felipe Colombo in the role of Karina. The series becomes the most successful fiction of the year. With the return of Erreway behind her back, the group begins to record without Luisana, a new album called Vuelvo, which would only be published in Spain and which included songs from the album Memoria recorded again by the trio. That same year the complete Erreway anthology was published in Spain. The new Spanish tour was finally canceled, as was the publication of the album Vuelvo that was already recorded. At the end of 2008, the series Atracción x4 was premiered in Dream Beach where, after a long time, she returned to share the script with Luisana Lopilato, playing Malena Lacalle, one of the members of the group "Latinas". This TV show replaced the Patito feo series, ending in 2009.

In 2010, she starred in the horror film Penumbra, shot in the city of La Plata and directed by the García Bogliano brothers, where she played Victoria, one of the clients interested in the Marga's department.

In 2012, she published a new song called "Solo me salva amar" with her new band formed with Felipe Colombo and Guillermo Lorenzo, "La Miss Tijuana". After the success of the first song, another song called "Vuelvo" is published in July. Since 2010 she walked away from fame. In 2011, Camila totally devotes herself to her Arcoyrá project, getting on a caravan to tour the country with her art space. This lifestyle, which included sleeping in the fields and cooking on a stove, attracted media attention. She also directed the play Una noche en el castillo.

In 2025, Bordonaba returned to music alongside Felipe Colombo and Benjamín Rojas on the Erreway tour "Juntos otra vez," with which they have toured Chile, Uruguay, Ecuador, Peru, Italy, Spain, Cyprus, Greece, Mexico, Paraguay, the Dominican Republic, and their native Argentina.

== Personal life ==
Bordonaba is the godmother of Erreway bandmate and close friend Felipe Colombo's daughter alongside Benjamín Rojas, whom she dated from 1998 to 2000.

Since 2012, Bordonaba quit being a public figure, living a quiet life in the south of Argentina, but still remains active in the arts, working as a director.

== Filmography ==
=== Television programs ===
Year	Program	Channel	Notes
1987–1992	Canta Niños	Telefe	Music TV show
1997-1998	Almorzando con Mirtha Legrand	Canal 13	Guest
1997	Hola Susana, te estamos llamando	Telefe	Guest
1997-2001	Videomatch	Telefe	Guest
1998	Nico R	Telefe	Guest
1998-2001	Susana Gimenéz	Telefe	Guest
1999-2000	Sábado Bus	Telefe	Guest
2000-2001	Almorzando con Mirtha Legrand	Canal 13	Guest
2001	Maru a la tarde	Telefe	Guest
2002	Georgina de noche	Canal 9	Guest
2002	Implacables	Canal 9	Guest
2002	Videomatch	Telefe	Guest
2003	Intrusos	América TV	Guest
2003	Almorzando con Mirtha Legrand	Canal 13	Guest
2003	Media Mañana	Canal 9	Guest
2004	Videomatch	Telefe	Guest
2005	Enfrentados	América TV	Guest
2005	TVO	América TV	Guest
2006	Soy el que más sabe de televisión del mundo	Cuatro	Guest
2007	Mañanas informales	Canal 13	Guest
2008	El muro infernal	Telefe	Participant
2009	Hoy puede ser	Canal 13	Guest
2013	AM, antes del mediodía	Telefe	Guest

=== Television ===
Year	Title	Character	Channel
1996-1998	Chiquititas	Patricia "Pato" Basualdo	Telefe
1999-2001	Chiquititas	Camila Bustillo	Telefe
2002-2003	Rebelde Way	Marizza Pía Spirito/Marizza Pía Andrade	Canal 9/América TV
2003	Rincón de Luz	Herself with the Erreway group	Canal 9
2004	Floricienta	Paloma Mónaco/Julieta Mónaco	Canal 13
2005	El Patrón de la Vereda	Sisí Ponte	América TV
2005	¿Quién es el Jefe?	Judge	Telefe
2006	Gladiadores de Pompeya	Violeta Baratto	Canal 9
2007-2008	Son de Fierro	Karina Andurregui	Canal 13
2008-2009	Atracción x4	Malena Lacalle	Canal 13

=== Theater ===
Year	Title	Character	Director	Theater
1996-1998	Chiquititas	Patricia	Cris Morena	Teatro Gran Rex
1999-2001	Chiquititas	Camila Bustillo	Cris Morena	Teatro Gran Rex
2002	Rebelde Way	Marizza Pía Spirito	Cris Morena	Teatro Gran Rex
2002-2007	Erreway	Herself	Cris Morena	
2011	Una noche en el castillo		Camila Bordonaba	

=== Movies ===
Year	Movie	Character	Director
2001	Chiquititas: Rincón de luz	Camila Bustillo	José Luis Massa
2004	Erreway: 4 caminos	Marizza Pía Spirito/Marizza Pía Andrade	Ezequiel Crupnicoff
2011	Penumbra	Victoria	Adrián García Bogliano

== Discography ==
=== Soundtrack albums ===
- 1996 — Chiquititas Vol. 2
- 1997 — Chiquititas Vol. 3
- 1998 — Chiquititas Vol. 4
- 1999 — Chiquititas Vol. 5
- 2000 — Chiquititas Vol. 6
- 2001 — Chiquititas Vol. 7
- 2001 — Chiquititas: Rincón de Luz
- 2005 — El Patrón de la Vereda
- 2007 — Son de Fierro
- 2008 — Atracción x4
- 2009 — Atracción x4

=== Erreway ===
- 2002 — Señales
- 2002 — Erreway en Grand Rex
- 2003 — Tiempo
- 2003 — Nuestro Tiempo
- 2004 — Nuestro Tiempo
- 2004 — Memoria
- 2004 — Gira 2004
- 2006 — El Disco de Rebelde Way
- 2006 — Erreway en Concierto
- 2007 — Erreway presenta su caja recopilatoria
- 2007 — Erreway en España
- 2021 — Vuelvo

=== La Miss Tijuana ===
- 2010 — Sólo Me Salva Amar
- 2010 — Vuelvo
- 2011 — Deja que llueva
- 2011 — 3 iguanas
