= Luisana Lopilato =

Argentine-Canadian actress, singer, and model (born 1987)

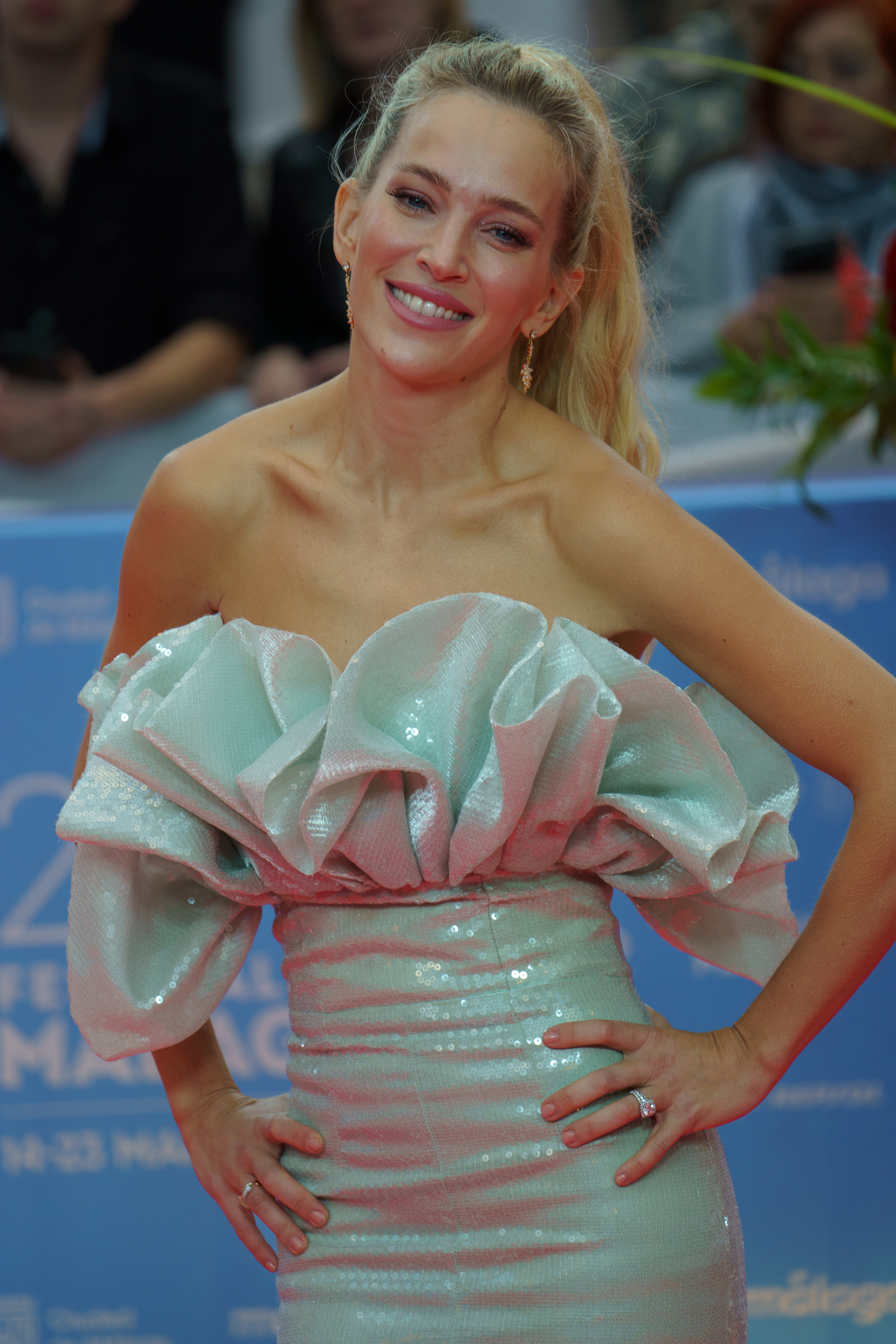
- Lopilato in 2025
- Born: Luisana Loreley Lopilato de la Torre; 18 May 1987 (age 39); Buenos Aires, Argentina
- Citizenship: Argentina; Canada (since 2023)
- Occupations: Actress; singer; model
- Years active: 1995–present
- Spouse: Michael Bublé (m. 2011)
- Children: 4
- Relatives: Darío Lopilato (brother)
- Website: luisanalopilato.com

Luisana Loreley Lopilato de la Torre Bublé (born 18 May 1987) is an Argentine actress, model and former singer. She was a member of the pop-rock band Erreway from 2002 to 2004.

== Early life ==
Lopilato was born to Eduardo Lopilato and Beatriz de la Torre. Her older siblings are actress and nutritionist Daniela Lopilato and actor Darío. She is of Spanish and Italian heritage; her great-grandfather was an immigrant from Muro Lucano, province of Potenza. She grew up in an evangelical Christian family and has stated that she is a devout Christian.

== Television career ==
=== Chiquititas (1999–2001) ===
Lopilato made her first guest appearance in the television series Chiquititas in 1997 at the age of 10 and then she made her debut in the television series Mi familia es un dibujo in 1998 at the age of 11, and continued working as a child model and starring in TV commercials, which is something she started at the age of 5. In 1999, she was chosen to play her first big role, Luisana Maza in Chiquititas at the age of 12, a popular television series created by Cris Morena. That role made Lopilato famous in her country.

Lopilato signed a contract with the Cris Morena Group, and released four Chiquititas soundtrack albums — Chiqutitias Vol. 5 (1999), Chiqutitias Vol. 6 (2000), Chiquititas Vol. 7 (2001) and Chiquititas: Rincón de Luz (2001). She reprised her role of Luisana Maza in Chiquititas, la historia, a mini–series broadcast in 2001, and Chiquititas: Rincón de Luz, a 2001 Chiquititas spin–off film. In 2000, she appeared in the film Un Amor en Moises Ville.

=== Rebelde Way and Erreway (2002–2006) ===
In 2002, Lopilato was given the role of Mía Colucci in the 2002—03 television series Rebelde Way, created by Cris Morena. She starred with Benjamín Rojas, Felipe Colombo and Camila Bordonaba, with whom she formed a pop rock band, Erreway. Erreway released three studio albums — Señales (2002), Tiempo (2003) and Memoria (2004) — which sold over 5 million copies. Señales and Tiempo earned Platinum certification in Argentina (Señales earned double Platinum) while Memoria earned Gold. Their 2004 film, Erreway: 4 Caminos, was a box–office success.

In 2007, Lopilato left Erreway and Rojas, Colombo and Bordonaba toured Spain as a trio.

It was confirmed that Lopilato would record a solo album and that she had signed with Universal Music Group.

=== Casados con Hijos and other work (2006–2009) ===
After Rebelde Way, she received several acting offers and signed with Pol-Ka Productions, with which she made two telenovelas, Los Secretos de Papá and Los Pensionados. In 2005, Lopilato appeared in Casados con Hijos, an Argentine version of Married... with Children.

She portrayed Paola Argento, a character originally portrayed by Christina Applegate. She was nominated for a Martín Fierro Award for Best Supporting Actress. She once again worked with Cris Morena on Alma Pirata.

In 2007, Lopilato was host of Los Premios MTV Latinoamérica, Latin MTV Awards, with the former Miss Colombia Valerie Domínguez. She was nominated for an ACE Award for Best Supporting Actress for her role onstage in Arlequín, and appeared in the Martín Fierro Award-nominated television comedy El Capo. Gente magazine named Lopilato "The Face of the Year". She starred with Rodrigo González and Sabrina Garciarena in the 2008 telenovela Encandilados, made especially for cell-phones, and also starred in the theatre play La Cenicienta with Rodrigo Guirao Díaz.

From 2008 to 2009, she starred in the series Atracción x4. In 2009, Lopilato starred opposite Nicolás Cabré and Gimena Accardi in the film Papá por un Día. Her animated film, Plumíferos, which was completed in 2008, was released in February 2010.

In June 2009, FHM magazine in Spain, ranked her 86 in its annual Las 100 mujeres más sexys del mundo.

=== International exposure (2010–2011) ===
In 2010, Lopilato completed the Channel 13 TV series Alguien que me quiera, in which she played Bianca Rivera, a sweet and sensitive young woman who struggled and suffered much for love. In November 2010, FHM in Spain ranked her 17th on its annual list Las 100 mujeres más sexys del mundo.

In late 2010, Lopilato announced that she was planning to marry the Canadian singer Michael Bublé in April 2011. Having completed the recordings of Alguien Que Me Quiera, Lopilato accompanied Bublé on his Crazy Love tour.

In 2011, Lopilato made her first film outside Argentina, the Spanish thriller Predeterminados (directed by Jordi Arencón), as "Vera". In June 2011, FHM in Spain ranked her 11th on the "Las 100 mujeres más sexys del mundo" list.

=== Lobo, Una buona stagione, En Terapia, and return to film (2012–2014) ===
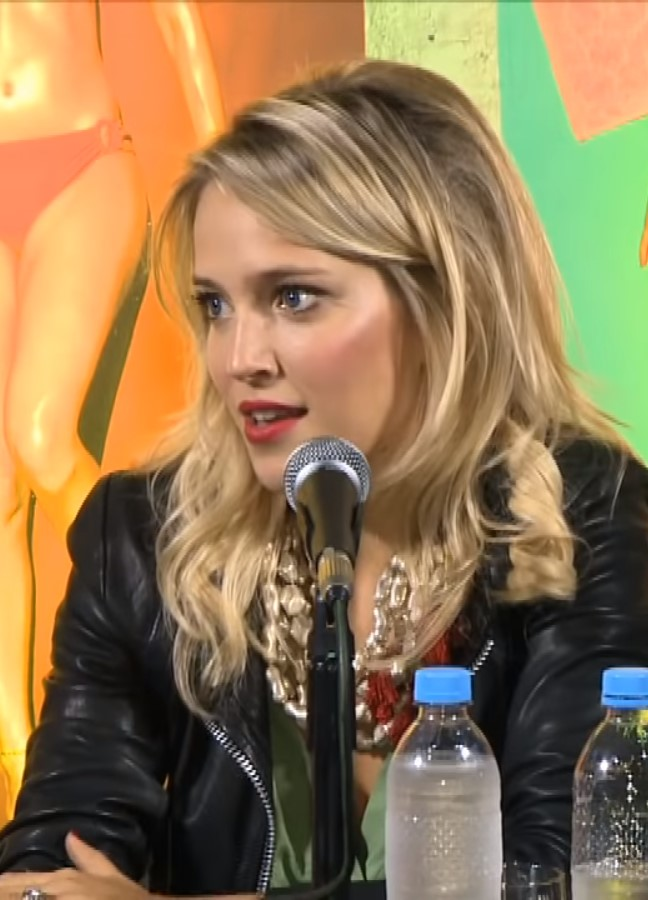
Luisana Lopilato at the press conference for the film Las Insoladas in 2014

Lopilato joined the cast of the El Trece series Lobo as a villainess, opposite Ana Linares's character (Vanesa González). In 2012, she portrayed Silvia, one of the lead roles in the Italian miniseries A Good Season transmitted by RAI, which premiered during 2014. In 2013, she played a young cancer victim in the second season of the Argentine remake of In Treatment, En terapia, starring Diego Peretti and broadcast by TV Publica. She was nominated for a Martin Fierro Award as Best Supporting Actress in a drama.

In 2014, Lopilato starred in the comedy film Las Insoladas, directed by Gustavo Taretto (known for his previous film Medianeras). After the premiere in September, she announced her next film project, Los que aman, odian, based on the book by Adolfo Bioy Casares and Silvina Ocampo.

=== Variaciones Walsh, Fair Market Value (2015) ===
In 2015, Lopilato returned to Argentinian TV in an episode of the mini-series Variaciones Walsh broadcast on public TV. She went to Hollywood acting in her first North American film entitled Fair Market Value; the cast included Tina Benko and Wendy Makkena. In the same year, she was invited to join Tu Cara Me Suena, a talent show, as part of the jury.

== Singing career ==
=== Chiquititas–Erreway ===
Lopilato began her career as a singer in the TV series that launched her to fame, Chiquititas. In 2000, she participated in the album with other actors from the series. The final part of the series was premiered in 2001. After Chiquitita, the creator of the series, Cris Morena, rehired Lopilato for a new series called Rebelde Way, from which emerged Erreway, a pop group consisting of the four main actors of the series. Benjamín Rojas, Lopilato, Felipe Colombo and Camila Bordonaba were the actors chosen for the series and the group. They released three studio albums: Señales (2002), Tiempo (2003) and Memoria (2004).

Two years later, as the group dissolved, the series was sold to Spain and the success of its music lead to a fourth and fifth album, this time a compilation entitled, El Disco de Rebelde Way (2006) and Erreway en Concierto (2006), and a show in Israel in 2004.

=== Atracción x4 ===
In 2008 and 2009, Lopilato was in the series Atracción x4, with her brother Darío Lopilato. The series generated another band which released two albums that received gold certification in Argentina.

== Modeling career ==
Lopilato was the face of the underwear brand Promesse from 2006 to 2010. In 2014, she finished her work as the face of Ultimo. She appeared in several commercials in Argentina and Israel. She started modeling as a child model at the age of 7 and even before, she had done some TV commercials. She has worked for such brands as 47 Street, Nazaria Zapatos, Prosegur, Keff, John Foos, Ultimo, Axe, Motor Oil, BlackBerry, Kukuloco, Rebelde Way underwear, Sugus Combinados, Pent Ten, Swatch, Marcela Koury, Ona Saez Jeans, Ripley S.A., Promesse, Bubbaloo, Ultimo, Despegar, Coca-Cola, McDonald's, Gottex, Vitamina, L'Oréal Elvive, Gillette, Alberto VO5 and Lady Stork.

== Personal life ==
From 2000 to 2004, she dated her co-worker from Chiquititas and Rebelde Way, Felipe Colombo. She also dated actor Mariano Martínez from 2004 to 2007, and tennis player Juan Mónaco from 2007 to 2008.

Lopilato started dating and then became engaged to Canadian singer Michael Bublé in 2009, having appeared in his music video for "Haven't Met You Yet" which was written for her. She married Bublé on March 31, 2011, in her native country Argentina, with a full ceremony in April. They have four children: a son born August 27, 2013, Noah, a son born January 21, 2016, Elias, a daughter born July 26, 2018, Vida, and another daughter born August 19, 2022, Cielo. Their oldest son was diagnosed with liver cancer hepatoblastoma in 2016, but has since recovered. The family lives in Burnaby, British Columbia, Canada. In 2023, Lopilato became a Canadian citizen.

== Filmography ==
=== Television ===
Year	Title	Character	Channel
1997	Chiquititas	Girl (guest)	Telefe
1998	Mi familia es un dibujo	Lorena	Telefe
1999–2001	Chiquititas	Luisana Maza	Telefe
2002–2003	Rebelde Way	Mía Colucci	Canal 9 / América TV
2003	Rincón de Luz	Herself with the Erreway group	Canal 9
2004	Los Pensionados	Kathy	Canal 13
2004–2005	Los secretos de papá	Camila Jilguero	Canal 13
2005	Numeral 15	Lola Gómez	Telefe
2005–2006	Casados con Hijos	Paola Argento	Telefe
2006	Alma Pirata	Allegra Riganti	Telefe
2007	El Capo	Ornella Mastrogiuseppe	Telefe
2008–2009	Atracción x4	Nina Lacalle	Canal 13
2010	Alguien que me quiera	Bianca Rivera	Canal 13
2011	Maltratadas	Susana "Susi" Álvarez de Matheu	América TV
2012	Lobo	Victoria Robledo	Canal 13
2013	En terapia	Valentina Rubio Guevara	TV Pública
2014	A Good Season	Silvia Ferrari Vda. de Masci	Rai 1
2015	Variaciones Walsh	Alicia Reynal	TV Pública
2016	Nafta Súper	Dr. Reyes / Harley Quinn	Space / I.Sat

=== Theater ===
Year	Title	Character	Director
1999–2001	Chiquititas	Luisana Maza	Cris Morena
2002	Rebelde Way	Mía Colucci	Cris Morena
2002–2004	Erreway	Herself	Cris Morena
2007	Arlequín, servidor de dos patrones	Clarisa	Alicia Zanca
2008	Princesa Cenicienta, el musical	Cinderella	Alicia Zanca
2020	Hermanos	Lisa	Matias del Federico
2023	Casados con Hijos	Paola Argento	Guillermo Francella

=== Movies ===
Year	Movie	Character	Director
2001	Un Amor en Moises Ville	Hanna	Daniel Barone and Antonio Ottone
2001	Chiquititas: Rincón de luz	Luisana Maza	José Luis Massa
2004	Erreway: 4 caminos	Mía Colucci	Ezequiel Crupnicoff
2009	Dad for a Day	Julieta Miriotti	Raúl Rodríguez Peila
2010	Plumíferos	Feifi	Daniel De Felippo and Gustavo A. Giannini
2014	Las Insoladas	Lala	Gustavo Taretto
2016	Fair Market Value	Kendall	Ken Kushner
2017	Los que aman, odian	Mary Fraga	Alejandro Maci
2018	Perdida	Manuela "Pipa" Pelari	Alejandro Montiel
2020	Intuition	Manuela "Pipa" Pelari	Alejandro Montiel
2022	Pipa	Manuela "Pipa" Pelari	Alejandro Montiel
2022	Matrimillas	Belén	Sebastián De Caro
2023	Predeterminados		Jordi Arencón
2023	Il cacio con le pere	Gabriella	Luca Calvani
2025	Mensaje en una Botella	Denise Conti	Gabriel Nesci
2026	Pepita, La Pistolera	Margarita Di Tullio, "Pepita la pistolera"	

=== Videoclips ===
Year	Song	Artist
2009	Haven't Met You Yet	Michael Bublé
2013	Close Your Eyes	Michael Bublé
2022	I'll Never Not Love You	Michael Bublé

== Awards and nominations ==
Year	Award	Category	Work	Result
2006	Martín Fierro Awards	Best Supporting Actress in a Comedy	Casados con Hijos	Nominated
2007	ACE Awards	Best Supporting Actress	Arlequín, servidor de dos patrones	Nominated
2009	Cilsa Awards	Protection of Animals	Herself	Winner
2011	Kids Choice Awards Argentina	Celebrity on Twitter	Herself	Nominated
2011	E! Awards	Celebrity of the Year	Herself	Nominated
2013	Tato Awards	Best Leading Actress in a Drama	En terapia	Nominated
2014	Nuevas miradas en la TV	Best Actress	En terapia	Nominated
2014	Martín Fierro Awards	Best Supporting Actress	En terapia	Nominated
2014	MTV Millennial Awards	Argentine Sniper of the Year	Herself	Nominated
2015	Silver Condor Awards	Best New Actress	Las insoladas	Nominated

== Discography ==
=== Soundtrack albums ===
- 1999 — Chiquititas Vol. 5
- 2000 — Chiquititas Vol. 6
- 2001 — Chiquititas Vol. 7
- 2001 — Chiquititas: Rincón de Luz
- 2006 — Alma Pirata
- 2008 — Atracción x4
- 2009 — Atracción x4

=== Erreway ===
- 2002 — Señales
- 2002 — Erreway en Grand Rex
- 2003 — Tiempo
- 2003 — Nuestro Tiempo
- 2004 — Nuestro Tiempo
- 2004 — Memoria
- 2004 — Gira 2004
- 2006 — El Disco de Rebelde Way
- 2006 — Erreway en Concierto
- 2007 — Erreway presenta su caja recopilatoria
