= Rebelde Way =

Argentine soap opera

- Genre: Drama, telenovela, comedy
- Created by: Cris Morena
- Written by: Patricia Maldonado
- Directed by: Cris Morena, Martín Mariani
- Starring: Camila Bordonaba, Benjamin Rojas, Luisana Lopilato, Felipe Colombo, Fernán Mirás, Catherine Fulop. Martin Seefeld, Miguel Ángel Cherutti, Arturo Bonín, Boy Olmi, Pablo Heredia, Hilda Brenard
- Theme music composer: Lina Samedin Maldonado, Cris Morena
- Opening theme: Rebelde Way, Resistire (season 1); Tiempo, Para Cosas Buenas, Vas a Salvarte (season 2)
- Ending theme: Rebelde Way
- Composer: Erreway
- Country of origin: Argentina
- Original language: Spanish
- No. of seasons: 2
- No. of episodes: 318

Production
- Executive producer: Augusto di Benedetto
- Producer: Cris Morena
- Production location: Argentina
- Cinematography: Various
- Running time: 45 minutes
- Production companies: Cris Morena Group, Yair Dori Media Group

Original release
- Network: Azul Televisión/Canal 9
- Release: 27 May 2002 – 10 November 2003

Related
- Rebelde (2004–06); Remix (2004-06); Rebelde; Rebelde Way (2008); Corazón rebelde Rebelde (2011); Rebelde (2022)

Rebelde Way is an Argentine telenovela created and produced by Cris Morena. It was originally broadcast on Azul Televisión from 27 May 2002 to 10 November 2003. The soap opera has been broadcast in many countries, including Greece, Israel and even eastern European countries, thus achieving international success.

Rebelde Way is set in the Elite Way School, a prestigious private boarding high school near Buenos Aires. The students are members of Argentina's wealthiest families, as well as gifted students with scholarships. The series follows the lives of the students, their parents and their professors, and it also features the regular use of English language and phrases by the upper class. Its central characters are Marizza Pía Spirito, Mía Colucci, Pablo Bustamante and Manuel Aguirre, portrayed by, respectively, Camila Bordonaba, Luisana Lopilato, Benjamín Rojas and Felipe Colombo. The four form a band named Erreway, in order to pursue their dreams. The band enjoyed great success in Argentina, Spain, Greece, Cyprus and especially in Israel, selling close 2 million records and achieving several platinum records. As well as a series of merchandising, Cris Morena Group also released a spin-off movie, Erreway: 4 Caminos (Erreway: 4 Roads), in 2004. The adult protagonists are Catherine Fulop, Martin Seefeld, Susana Ortíz y Fernán Mirás. The antagonists are Boy Olmi, Pablo Heredia, Inés Palombo, Gimena Accardi, Mariano Bertolini and Adriana Salonia.

== Plot summary ==
=== Season 1 (2002) ===
The Elite Way School is an internationally prestigious private secondary boarding school. For this reason, the regulation is very demanding. In the morning, the students take classes, and in the afternoons they dedicate themselves to improvement workshops, sports and the hectic social life of teenagers. The students are mostly children of the richest families in the country, and others who have won scholarships by virtue of their academic excellence. The latter are discriminated against by the former, and a secret organization, which the teachers believe fictitious, wants them out of the school. Despite the differences and fights that exist between Marizza Pía Spirito (Camila Bordonaba), Mía Colucci (Luisana Lopilato), Manuel Aguirre (Felipe Colombo) and Pablo Bustamante (Benjamín Rojas), they manage to form a band in secret from their parents and school, given that the only thing they have in common is the love of music.

=== Season 2 (2003) ===
The third year students are now in fourth year. New students are joining the Elite Way School. They are: Laura (Muni Seligmann), Dolores (Lis Moreno), Sol (Inés Palombo), Francisco (Francisco Bass) and Rocco (Piru Sáez). Among the teachers, Carmen Menéndez, a literature teacher and former student of the Elite Way School, where she always felt discriminated against because of her lack of beauty. Marizza, for her part, manages to channel her rebellion into a solidarity task, thanks to the appearance of Martín Andrade (Miguel Cherutti), a new teacher who makes her believe in herself. The band, still together, are not content with singing in hiding. The feeling for the group to exist and prosper is so strong that they fight for it with utmost motivation. They soon realize that the "outside" is not the strongest enemy, what threatens the union of the group are themselves. In the midst of this reality, these young people must face and survive the most difficult battle: that of forging their destiny and achieving their dreams without ceasing to be themselves.

== Cast and characters ==
=== Main ===
- Mia Colucci (played by Luisana Lopilato)
  - Mia is the epitome of beauty, fashion, and popularity at Elite Way School. She was raised in extreme wealth and privilege by her father, Franco Colucci, a famous fashion mogul. Despite seeming like a spoiled and superficial girl living a glamorous life, Mia is a lonely girl who grieves the loss and absence of her mother and longs for genuine affection. She is stylish, stubborn, sensitive, and loyal to those she cares for, such as Felicitas and Vico. Over time, she becomes more grounded, compassionate, and self-aware of the world outside her bubble.
- Pablo Bustamante (played by Benjamin Rojas)
  - Pablo is the charming and wealthy son of Sergio Bustamante, a powerful and corrupt politician. He faces the pressure to live up to his father's standards and often struggles between being the obedient son his father desires and his own authentic self (who has a great love singing and song-writing). At first glance, Pablo seems shallow and cocky, often going along with popularity schemes and bullying, but deep down, he is caring and loyal to his friends, Tomas and Guido. He is often conflicted with his relationship with Marizza, who begins as an enemy and becomes a friend and more. Pablo's story is marked by personal growth, the pursuit of freedom, and a commitment to his artistic dreams.
- Marizza Pia Spirito (played by Camila Bordonaba)
  - Marizza is a rebellious, quick-witted girl raised by her eccentric single mother, Sonia Rey, a famous and charismatic Argentinian celebrity. She is known for her punk-inspired fashion, sarcasm, and anti-authoritarian attitude. Despite her chaotic personality, Marizza is fiercely loyal to her friends, Lujan and Luna, and often fights for the injustices they and others face. She has a complex relationship with Pablo that toes the line from rivalry to love and rivalry to love again. Through and through, Marizza is outspoken and courageous.
- Manuel Aguirre (played by Felipe Colombo)
  - Originally from Mexico, Manuel arrives at Elite Way with a mission: revenge. He blames Franco Colucci for the financial ruin and subsequent suicide of his father. Initially cold, Manuel begins to let his guard down as he forms friendships with those around him, such as Nicolas, Luna, and Marizza. His natural charisma, intelligence, and sense of justice are what makes him who he is. He faces a challenge when an anti-scholarship secret group, La Logia, targets him and other students who don't live up to the wealthy standards of the school. An even bigger challenge presents itself when he finds unexpected attraction and love for Mia. Through music, Manuel finds healing, purpose, family, and peace.

== Erreway ==
Erreway was an Argentine band formed during the television series Rebelde Way, consisting of Camila Bordonaba, Felipe Colombo and Benjamín Rojas. Originally, it consisted of Bordonaba, Colombo, Rojas and Luisana Lopilato, who left the group in 2005. They released three studio albums – Señales, Tiempo and Memoria.

== Streaming on Netflix ==
On November 21, 2019 Netflix announced that Rebelde Way would enter its platform's catalog. The series premiered on December 8, 2019 and had more than 60 million views and entered the “Top 10” as one of the most watched series in several countries in Latin America and Europe.

== International broadcast ==
- Albania Shijak Tv as Rebelët.
- Argentina America TV y Azul TV-Canal 9 and Telefe (2013)
- Armenia Narek TV, Hay TV.
- Dominican Republic Tele Antillas
- North Macedonia A1 Television
- Lithuania LNK and TV1 as Maištingas amžius
- Chile La Red, Telecanal.
- Colombia Tele Antillas, Citytv, ZAZ and Telepacifico
- Costa Rica Repretel Canal 6
- Croatia Extra TV
- Spain Fox Kids, Jetix, Localia and Cuatro
- France Disney Channel, Game One and Canal+
- Kazakhstan НТК as Мятежный Дух
- Russia REN TV, Teen TV, Ю and Суббота! as Мятежный дух
- Serbia B92 as Butovnici
- Romania TVR2 as Rebelii
- Bolivia Red PAT
- Germany TeenNick.
- Israel broadcast by Viva, Fox Kids, HOT VOD and Channel 10 as המורדים
- Peru Frecuencia Latina, Yups
- Panama TVO and Tele 7
- Paraguay SNT, Red Guaraní, Magna TV
- Uruguay Teledoce.
- Venezuela La Tele
- Honduras
- Greece ET1 as Ανυπότακτες Καρδιές
- Kosovo KTV as Rebelët
- Georgia broadcast by Rustavi 2 as მეამბოხე სულები/meambokhe sulebi.
- Cyprus ANT1 as Ανυπότακτες Καρδιές.
- Italy Rai Due and Rai Gulp
- Mexico ZAZ TV.
- Ukraine Новим Каналом as Буремний шлях.
- Bosnia OBN
- Philippines broadcast by TV5 as Rebelde
- India broadcast by Know Channel India as Rebelde Way (2020)
- Indonesia broadcast by Indosiar.
- United Kingdom BBC One
- Australia 7two
- Canada YTV and Télétoon

== Awards and nominations ==
- 2003 — Martín Fierro Award for Best Telenovela — nomination

== International remakes ==
The format has been sold in various countries internationally, and numerous remakes of Rebelde Way had been made. In 2003, the Spanish public broadcaster TVE bought the rights to adapt the show. It did not go into production because of disagreements between the executives and Cris Morena Group. Also in 2003, Destiny, an independent company in Brazil, bought the rights and produced a pilot but it was not picked up by any network.

According to Cris Morena, the first country to buy the format was India, there they produced the history under the name Remix. Produced by Rose Audio Visuals, it was broadcast on the Star One channel. A hit among teenagers, it has returned on the same channel. In 2004, Morena sold the rights of Rebelde Way to Televisa, and they produced the Mexican version, titled Rebelde, from 2004 to 2006. The show was a major success in the country, as well as the rest of Latin America and even in Hispanic channels in the United States. In 2008, a Portuguese version of the same name was made by the SIC channel. Its first season started in September, but the second season was cancelled due to poor ratings. Corazón Rebelde is the Chilean remake of the show that was broadcast from August 2009 on Canal 13 with the name of S.O.S. and "Corazón Rebelde" as the slogan. Two weeks after the start of the show the name was changed to its previous title. It has had a good reception since it was released.In 2008, a Greek version was made by the Alpha TV channel.The unique season of the series ended in the summer of 2009.The title was called Γ4

- Mexico – Rebelde (2004–2006)
- India – Remix (2004–2006)
- Portugal – Rebelde Way (2008–2009)
- Chile – Corazón rebelde (2009)
- Brazil – Rebelde (2011–2012)
- Greece – Γ4 (2008–2009)
- Mexico – Rebelde (2022)

Original characters	Argentina	Mexico	India	Portugal	Chile	Brazil	Greece
Mía Colucci	Luisana Lopilato	Anahí	Shweta Gulati	Joana Anes	Luciana Echeverría	Sophia Abrahão	Myriella Kourenti
Marizza Pía Spirito	Camila Bordonaba	Dulce María	Priya Wal	Joana Alvarenga	Denise Rosenthal	Lua Blanco	Katerina Misihroni
Manuel Aguirre	Felipe Colombo	Alfonso Herrera	Karan Wahi	Nelson Antunes	Ignacio Garmendia	Micael Borges	Giorgos Spanias
Pablo Bustamante	Benjamín Rojas	Christopher Uckermann	Raj Singh Arora	Tiago Barroso	Augusto Schuster	Arthur Aguiar	Panagiotis Exarheas
