= Rebeldes – Ao vivo =

Live album by Rebeldes
- Released: 11 June 2012
- Recorded: 5 December 2012; São Paulo, Brazil
- Genre: Pop; dance-pop
- Length: 64:12
- Label: EMI; Record Entretenimento
- Producer: Rick Bonadio

Rebeldes chronology
Rebeldes (2011)	Rebeldes – Ao vivo (2012)	Meu Jeito, Seu Jeito (2012)

Rebeldes – Ao vivo is the first live album by Brazilian pop group Rebeldes, officially launched on April 11, 2012, throughout the country. The album also accompanies the release of the band's first DVD, with the same title.

Recorded in the Espaço das Américas, in São Paulo, the DVD is part of the band's first tour. The show brings the main successes of the group, such as "Rebelde para Sempre", "Do Jeito Que Eu Sou", "Quando Estou do Seu Lado", "O Amor Está em Jogo" and "Como um Rockstar". In all, the CD and DVD Rebeldes - Ao vivo sold around 140,000 copies in Brazil. The CD sold approximately 60,000 copies and was awarded with a gold disc, and the DVD sold approximately 80,000 copies and was awarded with a platinum disc. The album Rebeldes - Ao vivo was the 32nd best selling album in Brazil in 2012. This was a modest number for the band, but the DVD became EMI Music Brasil's best seller and was one of the best sellers of the year of 2012.

"Nada Pode Nos Parar" was released as an exclusive song and is featured as a bonus and exclusively on the album. The promotional single obtained a great commercial success, reaching the 1st position in Brazil Hot Pop and the 2nd position in Brazil Hot 100 Airplay.

== Background ==
The DVD was recorded from the tour Rebeldes Teen Festival. The show was recorded in two days; the first was the recording of the album and the second of the DVD. In the show each one of the six components of the band makes a cover for the section "DJ Party": Sophia Abrahão sings "Born This Way" by Lady Gaga; Chay Suede sings "Last Nite" by the band The Strokes; Lua Blanco sings "Firework" by Katy Perry; Arthur Aguiar sings "Toda Forma de Amor" by Lulu Santos; and Mel Fronckowiak sings "Loca" by Shakira. The only member of the band who does not sing a cover song is Micael Borges. He does an original rap called "Rap Rebeldes".

== Track listing ==
=== CD ===
#	Title	Artist	Additional artists
1	"Rebelde para Sempre"	Chay Suede and Micael Borges	Lua Blanco
2	"Do Jeito Que Eu Sou"	Lua Blanco	Chay Suede
3	"Tchau pra Você!"	Chay Suede	
4	"Ponto Fraco"	Sophia Abrahão and Micael Borges	
5	"Quando Estou do Seu Lado"	Melanie Fronckowiak and Chay Suede	
6	"Você É o Melhor Pra Mim"	Lua Blanco and Arthur Aguiar	
7	"Depois da Chuva"	Arthur Aguiar	Melanie Fronckowiak, Chay Suede, Sophia Abrahão, Micael Borges and Lua Blanco
8	"O Amor Está em Jogo"	Lua Blanco, Chay Suede and Micael Borges	Melanie Fronckowiak
9	"Como um Rockstar"	Lua Blanco and Chay Suede	Melanie Fronckowiak
10	"Juntos Até o Fim"	Melanie Fronckowiak, Arthur Aguiar, Sophia Abrahão and Lua Blanco	Chay Suede and Micael Borges
11	"Livre pra Viver"	Micael Borges	
12	"Um Dia de Cada Vez"	Sophia Abrahão, Chay Suede, Arthur Aguiar and Melanie Fronckowiak	
13	"Outra Frequência"	Melanie Fronckowiak and Sophia Abrahão	Lua Blanco
14	"Born This Way"	Sophia Abrahão	
15	"Last Nite"	Chay Suede	
16	"Rap Rebeldes"	Micael Borges	
17	"Firework"	Lua Blanco	
18	"Toda Forma de Amor"	Arthur Aguiar	
19	"Loca"	Melanie Fronckowiak	
20	"Rebelde para Sempre (Remix)"	Rebeldes	
21	"Nada Pode Nos Parar"	Lua Blanco and Chay Suede	Melanie Fronckowiak

=== DVD ===
#	Title	Artist	Additional artists
1	"Rebelde para Sempre"	Chay Suede and Micael Borges	Lua Blanco
2	"Do Jeito Que Eu Sou"	Lua Blanco	Chay Suede
3	"Tchau pra Você!"	Chay Suede	
4	"Ponto Fraco"	Sophia Abrahão and Micael Borges	
5	"Quando Estou do Seu Lado"	Melanie Fronckowiak and Chay Suede	
6	"Você É o Melhor Pra Mim"	Lua Blanco and Arthur Aguiar	
7	"Depois da Chuva"	Arthur Aguiar	Melanie Fronckowiak, Chay Suede, Sophia Abrahão, Micael Borges and Lua Blanco
8	"O Amor Está em Jogo"	Lua Blanco, Chay Suede and Micael Borges	Melanie Fronckowiak
9	"Como um Rockstar"	Lua Blanco and Chay Suede	Melanie Fronckowiak
10	"Juntos Até o Fim"	Melanie Fronckowiak, Arthur Aguiar, Sophia Abrahão and Lua Blanco	Chay Suede and Micael Borges
11	"Livre pra Viver"	Micael Borges	
12	"Um Dia de Cada Vez"	Sophia Abrahão, Chay Suede, Arthur Aguiar and Melanie Fronckowiak	
13	"Outra Frequência"	Melanie Fronckowiak and Sophia Abrahão	Lua Blanco
14	"Born This Way"	Sophia Abrahão	
15	"Last Nite"	Chay Suede	
16	"Rap Rebeldes"	Micael Borges	
17	"Firework"	Lua Blanco	
18	"Toda Forma de Amor"	Arthur Aguiar	
19	"Loca"	Melanie Fronckowiak	
20	"Rebelde para Sempre (Remix)"	Rebeldes	
