= Sophia Abrahão discography =

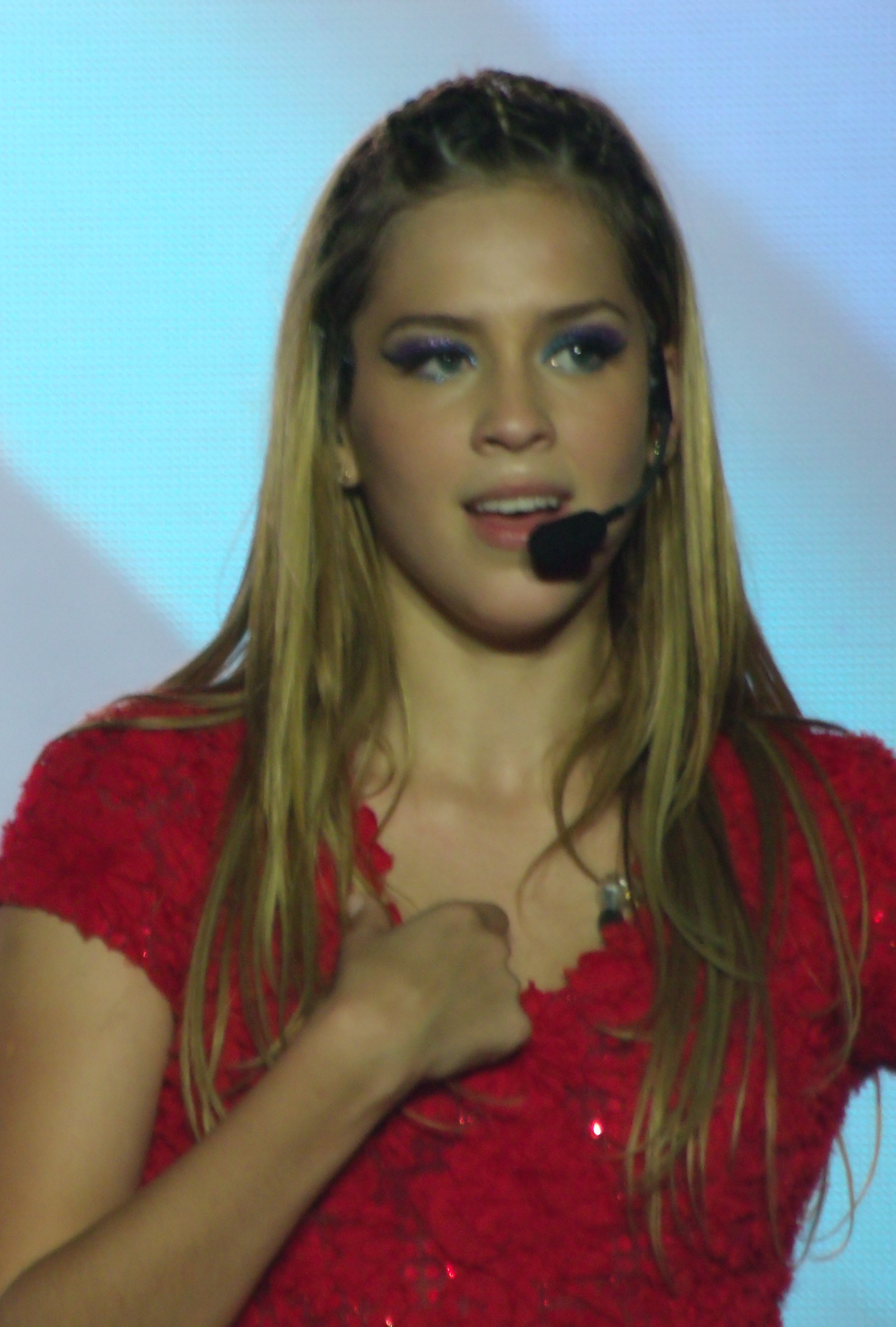
- Sophia Abrahão performing at a concert with Rebeldes in 2012.
- Studio albums: 1
- EPs: 1
- Singles: 10
- Music videos: 11

Below is the discography by Brazilian singer Sophia Abrahão.

== Albums ==
=== Studio albums ===
Title	Details
Sophia Abrahão	Released: October 16, 2015; Format: CD, digital download; Label: FS Music

=== EPs ===
Title	Details
Sophia	Released: July 14, 2014; Format: Digital download; Label: Independent
Dance!	Released: November 17, 2017; Format: Digital download; Label: Independent

== Singles ==
List of singles
Title	Year	Peak chart positions	Album
Title	Year	BRA	Album
"Sem Você" (with Brian Cohen)	2012	—	Non-album single
"Não Quero Mais" (with Brian Cohen)	2013	—	Non-album single
"É Você"	2013	7	Non-album single
"Flores"	2013	2	Non-album single
"Deixa Estar"	2014	—	Sophia
"No Final"	2015	—	Sophia
"Tudo Que Eu Sempre Quis"	2015	—	Sophia
"Náufrago"	2015	1	Sophia Abrahão
"Sou Fatal"	2016	5	Non-album single
"O Bom É Que Passa"	2017	13	Non-album single
"Rebola" (featuring Boss In Drama)	2017	1	Dance!
"—" denotes releases that did not chart or were not released in that territory.

== Other appearances ==
Title	Year	Peak chart positions	Other artist(s)	Album
Title	Year	BRA	Other artist(s)	Album
"Mágica do Amor / Por Enquanto"	2014	—	Oba Oba Samba House	Ao Vivo no Rio
"Carrossel"	2016	46	Fernando Zor	Fs Loop 360º, Vol 2. (Ao Vivo)
"Deixa Estar (Another Home)"	2017	—	Pagan John	Ao Vivo no Auditório Ibirapuera
"—" denotes releases that did not chart or were not released in that territory.

== Music videos ==
List of music videos, showing year released and director
Title	Year	Director
"Sem Você" (with Brian Cohen)	2012	Gabriel Pignataro
"Não Quero Mais" (with Brian Cohen)	2013	Gabriel Pignataro
"É Você"	2013	Bruno Fioravanti
"Flores"	2014	Bruno Fioravanti
"Deixe Estar (Another Home)" (featuring Pagan John)	2014	Gustavo Pagan
"No Final"	2015	Bruno Fioravanti
"Tudo Que Eu Sempre Quis"	2015	Bruno Fioravanti
"Náufrago"	2015	Alex Batista
"Sou Fatal"	2016	Thiago Calviño
"Deixa Eu Gostar de Você"	2016	Jacques Dequeker
"O Bom É Que Passa"	2017	Sergio Malheiros
