= Corazón rebelde =

Chilean television series

- Also known as: S.O.S Corazón rebelde
- Genre: Telenovela
- Created by: Cris Morena
- Based on: Rebelde Way
- Written by: Julio Rojas; Luisa Hurtado; Daniela Lillo; León Murillo; Catalina Calcagni; Melisa Aedo
- Directed by: Herval Abreu; Valeria Salas
- Starring: Denise Rosenthal; Augusto Schuster; Luciana Echeverría; Ignacio Garmendia
- Opening theme: "Corazón rebelde" by CRZ
- Country of origin: Chile
- Original language: Spanish
- No. of episodes: 80

Production
- Executive producers: Alex Bowen; Juan Ignacio Vicente
- Producers: Mitzy Saldivia; Claudia Romero
- Production location: Santiago
- Running time: 60 minutes
- Production companies: Canal 13; Alce Producciones

Original release
- Network: Canal 13
- Release: August 18 – December 16, 2009

Related
- Rebelde Way (2002); Remix; Rebelde Way (2008); Rebelde (2011); Rebelde (2022)

Corazón rebelde (English: Rebel Heart) is a Chilean telenovela produced and broadcast by Canal 13 from August 18 to December 16, 2009. Directed by Herval Abreu and Valeria Salas and starring Denise Rosenthal, Augusto Schuster, Luciana Echeverría and Ignacio Garmendia, it is based on the Argentine telenovela Rebelde Way. It is the first Canal 13 television series recorded in high definition format (720p) that was transmitted in the ISDB-T test signal in Santiago.

== Cast ==
=== Main ===
- Luciana Echeverría as María José "Cote" Colucci
- Ignacio Garmendia as Manuel Santander
- Denise Rosenthal as Martina Valdivieso
- Augusto Schuster as Pablo Bustamante

=== Supporting ===
- Magdalena Müller as Luna Fernández
- José Manuel Palacios as Tomás Echenique
- María Gracia Omegna as Pilar Ortuzar
- Felipe Álvarez as Guido Lassen
- Carolina Vargas as Maite Medina
- Constanza Pozo as Francisca Valdés
- Constanza Varela as Victoria "Vico" López
- Samir Ubilla as Nicolás Hurtado
- Francisco González as Marco Délano
- Katty Kowaleczko as Sonia Rey
- Fernando Kliche as Franco Colucci
- Tomás Vidiella as Sergio Bustamante
- Alex Zisis as Marcelo Ortuzar
- Elvira Cristi as Gloria Soto
- Nicolás Saavedra as Diego Mancilla
- Aranzazú Yankovic as Josefina "Pepa" Hormazabal
- Ignacia Baeza as Daniela Leyton
- Erto Pantoja as Peter O´Ryan
- Teresita Reyes as Sandra Murua
- Javiera Ramos as Estela Bustamante
- Teresa Munchmeyer as Hilda Correa
- Alejandro Trejo as Raúl Santander
- Mabel Farías as Carla Durán de Santander
- Carolina Arregui as Marina Cáceres
- Marcela Osorio as Mercedes Donoso
- Luis Gnecco as director Rubén Iturra
- Loreto Araya-Ayala as Claudia Jara
- Guido Vecchiola as Mauro del Solar
- Nicolás Brown as Rolo González
- Verónica González as Guido's mother
- Jaime Omeñaca as Nicolás Hurtado (father)
- Loreto Moya as Anita, Nicolás' mother
- Agustín Moya as Federico Valdivieso
- Jaime Artus as David Campbell, Alto Santiago alumni
- Gabriela Ernst as Carmen Iturra
- Julio César Serrano as Darío
- Emilio García as Guido's father
- Francisco Celhay as Ricardo Valenzuela
- Catalina González as Julieta Donoso
- Guillermo Helo as Andrés
- José Luis Cáceres as Joaquín del Real
- Juan Carlos Cáceres as Carlós Velásquez
- Shelton as Ernesto Villarte
- Luis Eduardo Campos as Nachito
- Kevin Vásquez as Key-B
- Julio Jung Duvauchelle as the police officer
