= Rebeldes discography =

- Studio albums: 2
- Live albums: 1
- Singles: 4
- Video albums: 1
- Music videos: 3

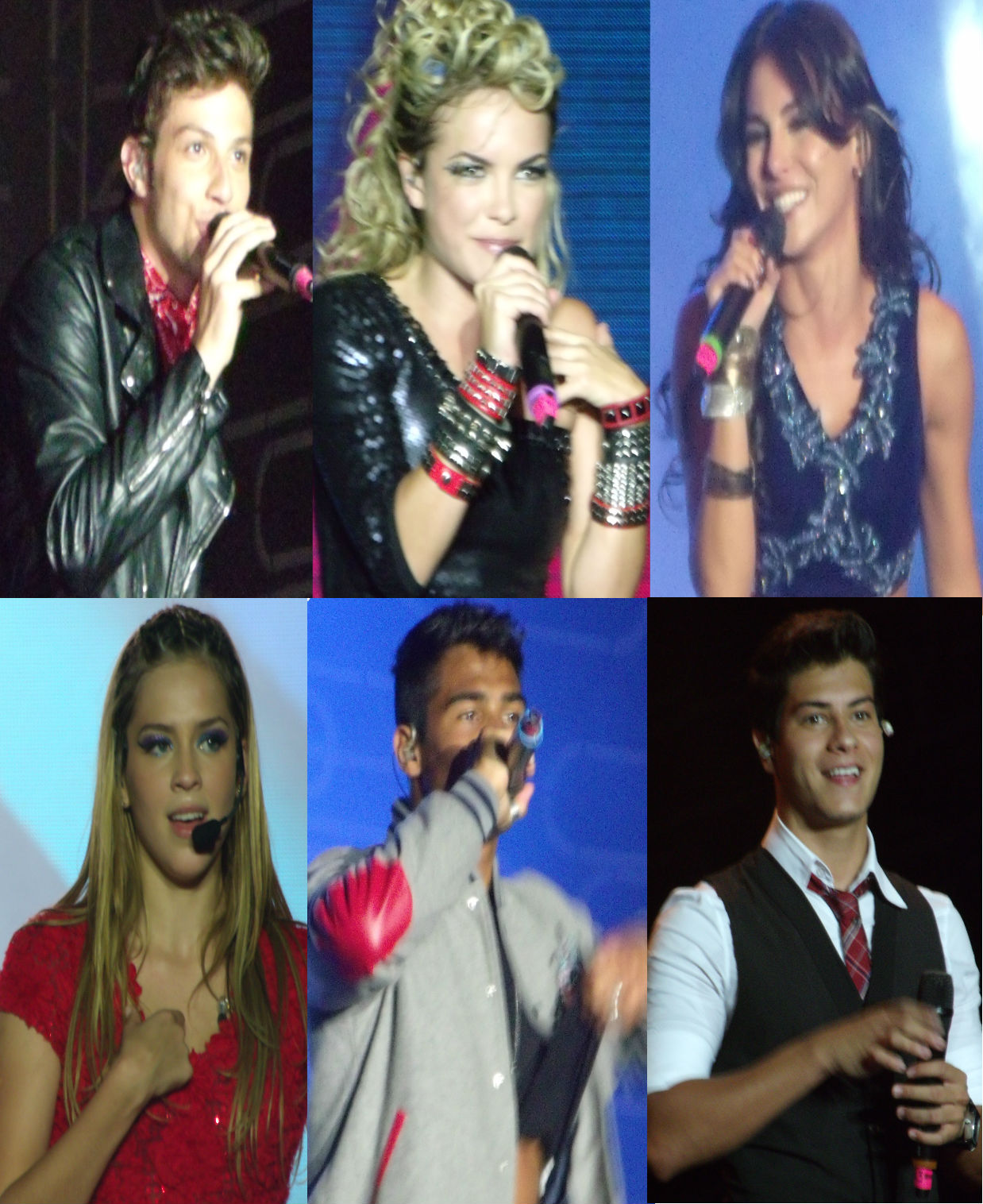

The discography of the Brazilian band Rebeldes, a namesake of the Mexican band RBD, consists of two studio albums, one live album, one DVD, and eight singles, including 4 officers and 4 promotional.

== Albums ==
=== Studio albums ===
Title	Album details	Peak chart positions			Sales	Certifications
Title	Album details	BRA ABPD	BRA Top 40	Mexican Albums Chart	Sales	Certifications
Rebeldes	Released: September 30, 2011; Label: EMI, Record Entretenimento; Format: CD, digital download	3	10	28	BRA: 240.000+	ABPD: Platinum; ABPD: 2× Platinum; ABPD: Platinum
Meu Jeito, Seu Jeito	Released: December 9, 2012; Label: EMI, Record Entretenimento; Format: CD, digital download	10	19	-	BRA: 80.000+	ABPD: Platinum
"—" denotes releases that did not chart or were not released in that region.

=== Live albums ===
Title	Album details	Peak chart positions		Sales	Certifications
Title	Album details	BRA ABPD	BRA Top 40	Sales	Certifications
Rebeldes – Ao vivo	Released: April 11, 2012; Label: EMI, Record Entretenimento; Format: CD, digital download	4	10	BRA: 150.000+	ABPD: Platinum
"—" denotes releases that did not chart or were not released in that region.

== Singles ==
Year	Title	Peak chart positions				Album
Year	Title	BRA Hot 100	BRA Bill.	BRA Bill. Pop	BRA Bill. Regional SP	Album
2011	"Do Jeito Que Eu Sou"	13	18	14	5	Rebeldes
2011	"Quando Estou do Seu Lado"	32	41	10	1	Rebeldes
2012	"Depois da Chuva"	10	24	1	7	Rebeldes
2012	"Liberdade Consciente"	50	-	-	-	Meu Jeito, Seu Jeito
"—" denotes releases that did not chart or were not released in that region.

=== Promotional singles ===
Year	Title	Peak chart positions		Album
Year	Title	BRA Hot 100	Billboard Brasil Hot Pop	Album
2011	"Como um Rockstar"	12	1	Rebeldes
2011	"O Amor Está em Jogo"	7	12	Rebeldes
2012	"Nada Pode Nos Parar"	16	1	Rebeldes - Ao vivo
2012	"Meu Jeito, Seu Jeito"	-	-	Meu Jeito, Seu Jeito
"—" denotes releases that did not chart or were not released in that region.

== Videography ==
=== Video albums ===
Title	Album details	Peak chart positions		Sales	Certifications
Title	Album details	BRA ABPD	BRA Top 40	Sales	Certifications
Rebeldes - Ao vivo	Released: April 11, 2012; Labels: EMI, Record Entretenimento; Formats: DVD	15	3	BRA: 160.000+	ABPD: 2× Platinum
"—" denotes releases that did not chart or were not released in that region.

=== Music videos ===
Year	Video	Director
2011	"Do Jeito Que Eu Sou"	Maurício Eça
2012	"Nada Pode Nos Parar"	Ivan Zettel
2012	"Depois da Chuva"	Ivan Zettel
