= Lua Blanco =

Brazilian actress (1987–2026)

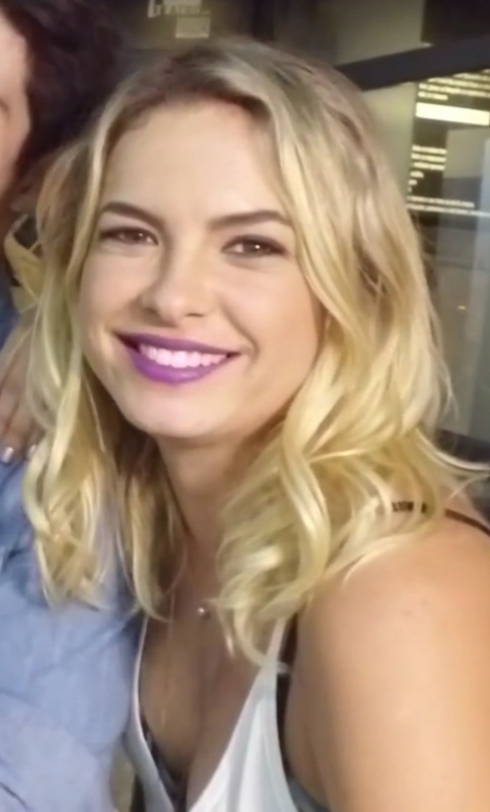
- Blanco in 2017
- Born: Lua Maria Blanco; March 5, 1987; São Paulo, Brazil
- Died: October 18, 2026 (aged 39); Rio de Janeiro, Brazil
- Occupations: Singer; songwriter; actress; writer; translator
- Years active: 2004–2026
- Style: Pop; folk-pop

Signature
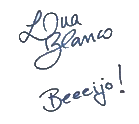

Lua Maria Blanco (Portuguese: [ˈluɐ ˈblɐ̃ku]; March 5, 1987 – October 18, 2026) was a Brazilian actress, singer, songwriter, translator and writer.

Blanco was praised for her talent, charisma and her ability to play different roles.

She achieved success on the telenovela Rebelde and as lead singer of the band, Rebeldes, which received one gold, two platinum, and one double-platinum album awards. Band members included Arthur Aguiar, Chay Suede, Micael Borges, Mel Fronckowiak and Sophia Abrahão. Lua performed about 90 shows over a span of three years, for a total of over 1.2 million spectators in Brazil.

During her career, she received nine nominations for the Shorty Awards, winning once as 'Vox Populi', for having the most nominations in the "Actress" category. Blanco was also voted the most suitable artist for all editions of Capricho Awards and was the only person to win all the categories in which she was nominated.

== Early life ==
Lua was born in São Paulo, Brazil, on March 5, 1987, the daughter of musician Billy Blanco Junior and Maria Claudia Blanco. She was the granddaughter of Billy Blanco, who was a successful bossa nova artist. Blanco was born in São Paulo and, at the time of her death, resided in Rio de Janeiro. She was raised in a large family of musicians; she has an older brother Pedro Sol and four younger siblings. They were raised in an U.S. christian cult and were home-schooled in English and later learned Portuguese. The family moved often, including living in Peru for two years. The children were active in musical and social projects since early on.

She performed from a very young age in a musical group with her parents and siblings. Lua and her siblings recorded an album called O Trem do Arco-Íris (The Rainbow Train), in Portuguese and English, that was never released by Sony Music. Later, in 2004, Sony released a self-distributed Christmas album with the whole family, called Família Blanco – É Natal (It's Christmas) (2004).

== Career ==
=== Early career (2005–2006) ===
At the time of the release of the Christmas album, Lua, and her family spent weekends and holidays performing in restaurants, shopping malls and in other small venues in Rio de Janeiro. Their set-list consisted mostly of bossa nova and Beatles songs.

In 2006, at age 19, Lua got accepted into the Catholic University PUC-Rio, to study English and Portuguese translation. While in college, she met André Sigaud, Rique Meirelles and Carol Cabral, and together they founded a pop-rock band initially named Collecting Dreams, that was later renamed Lágrima Flor, a tribute to her grandfather's renowned bossa nova hit. As lead singer and co-songwriter, Lua's experience in the band helped her define her musical identity and voice, and the five years in which she performed and created with André and the rest of the band were the most artistically defining of her early career.

=== Theatre, television and film (2008–2010) ===
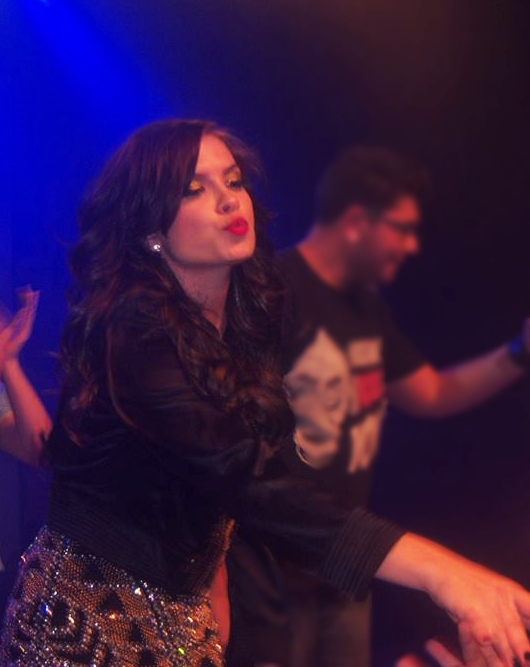
Lua Blanco at a musical

Blanco took courses to improve her talents: singing lessons with Professor Carol Savoy; Theatrical Interpretation at Casa de Cultura with Laura Alvim, with Daniel Herz (2008–2009); Diving Theatre, the CAL course with Isaac Bernat, Claudia Melle and Renata Frisina (2009); Interpretation Workshop with Walter Lima to Cinema (2009); training workshop for Rebelde on TV Record, with Roberto Bomtempo (2010); and workshopping with the casting director Sergio Penna (2013).

Blanco began acting in 2008; her first stage role was Isolde in Romeu e Isolda. That same year, she appeared in the Rede Globo telenovela Três Irmãs (Three Sisters), playing surfer Bia.

In 2009, Blanco returned to theater, cast as the character Mariana in the musical O Despertar da Primavera (Spring Awakening) by Duncan Sheik based on the play by Frank Wedekind; the musical was produced, translated and directed by Charles Moeller and Cláudio Botelho. Among the three thousand who auditioned, Blanco and her siblings Pedro Sol and Estrela were among the 19 finalists. In 2010, they released a soundtrack album for the musical. Blanco also played rock-musician Joe in the Globo telenovela Malhação and joined the cast of young presenters for TV Globinho.

In 2010, Blanco played Grace in the Globo telenovela As Aventuras do Didi (The Adventures of Didi). She re-recorded the hits "A Thousand Miles" by Vanessa Carlton and "Umbrella" by Rihanna, released on Relaxing Bossa – Volume 4. Blanco also came to rehearse for Natália in the play Confessions of a Teenager based on the book series of author Maria Mariana, but because of other commitments she could not continue in the show.

In the beginning of 2011, she debuted as Talia in the feature film Teus Olhos Meus (Soulbound ), which was directed and written by Caio Sóh.

=== Success in Rebelde (2011–2013) ===
Blanco became known for playing Roberta Messi, one of the protagonists on the Brazilian version of the telenovela Rebelde (Rebel ). Written by Margareth Boury and directed by Ivan Zettel, it was inspired by the eponymous Mexican telenovela by Pedro Damián. Auditions lasted four months and in late 2010, Blanco was chosen as one of the finalists. She completed a series of tests including acting, dancing, and singing to play the rebellious character Roberta. Rebelde portrayed the everyday life of young people living at a prestigious boarding school, facing typical teenage drama beyond the main storyline, such as alcoholism, bullying, eating disorders, and family problems. The telenovela premiered on March 21, 2011, and completed its final episode on October 12, 2012; the series was divided into two seasons and was broadcast in 410 episodes.

Blanco and the other five lead Rebelde actors – Arthur Aguiar, Chay Suede, Mel Fronckowiak, Micael Borges and Sophia Abrahão – were also the vocalists for the Rebeldes band. They were signed to Rede Record to tour and record along with acting on tbe.TV series, and performed about 90 shows in Brazil over three years. The first Rebel Tour (October 30, 2011 – January 30, 2012) had shows conclude with Blanco singing "Firework" by Katy Perry for up to 90 thousand spectators. Following the telenovela's conclusion, the Farewell Tour Nada Pode Nos Parar (Nothing Can Stop Us) (January 30, 2012 – August 18, 2012) showed an audience demand that allowed for multiple tour extensions. They chose to perform ten days of concerts in the northeast, then launched the Turne Asepxia (Tour Asepxia) (August 25 – September 23, 2012). Lastly, the Rebels Forever Tour began in September 2012 and revisited cities for additional farewell concerts.

On September 23, 2011, the band's album Rebeldes was released, selling about 120,000 copies and earning platinum certification. The music video for the single "The Way I Am" was released in December of the same year.

==== Achievements with Rebeldes ====
On April 11, the band launched its first live album and DVD, Rebels Live, taken from show recordings in São Paulo. It sold 40,000 copies for gold certification, and a DVD equivalent of 50,000 copies for platinum. Together they yielded 140,000 copies. With the DVD they released a music video for the song "Nada Pode Nos Parar". In June, "After the Rain" became another hit single. On December 9, 2012, the band released a studio album, Meu Jeito, Seu Jeito (My Way, Your Way).

In 2012, Blanco appeared in the video "It was the Chosen" by her former band, Lágrima Flor, as an actress.

Rebeldes' final show was in Belo Horizonte on May 4, 2013.

=== 2013 onwards ===
At the beginning of 2013, Blanco recorded a duet with singer João Teles of Pietros for "Todo Dia" (Every Day), released in April, and appeared in the music video. She made another duet with Rodrigo Fragoso, "Tudo Vai Mudar" (Everything Will Change).

In 2013, Blanco returned to the theater in the role of Anne, a protagonist of the comedy Stand Up with Matheus Souza, who directed and wrote the play. The show was successful and extended. In the same year, she participated in the musical As Coisas Que Fizemos e Não Fizemos (The Things We Did and Did not Do) as Paula, where she worked with actress Giselle Batista and Matheus Souza (who wrote and directed the show).

In July–August 2013, she made a cameo in the last two performances of Tudo por um Popstar (Everything for a Popstar) in Rio de Janeiro and three performances in São Paulo. The play portrayed the adventures of three friends who travel to the capital to watch the show of their biggest pop idols. Blanco took the stage with the cast to sing "I'm Yours" by Jason Mraz, a song and video she recorded with the Pietros band (who also attended), plus "Meu Jeito Seu Jeito" (My Way, Your Way) from the Rebeldes catalog.

Blanco recorded the song "Turnaround" for the film A Brasileira (The Brazilian). The film's producers were Uri Singer and Fabio Golombek, and starring actors included Fernanda Machado, Greg Tuculescu, Dean Cain, Mariel Hemingway, and Scott Rodgers.

Blanco returned to telenovelas in Pecado Mortal (Mortal Sin), which debuted on September 25, 2013. Blanco radically changed her look for the role due to the nature of the plot, the 1970s setting, and to better resemble the actor who played her character's mother.

Blanco directed a series pilot for a show called UO, featuring actors Miguel Romulo, Mariana Molina, Rael Barja, and Diego Montez.

In early 2014, Blanco was cast in Se Eu Fosse Você – O Musical (If I Were You – The Musical), a stage adaptation of the popular Brazilian film of the same name. Lua played Bia, the daughter of protagonists Helena (Claudia Netto) and Claudio (Nelson Freitas). It opened on March 21, in Rio de Janeiro, under the supervision of Daniel Filho, Flavio Marinho, with direction and choreography by Alonso Barros, and musical direction by Guto Graça Mello.

In late 2014, Blanca began filming and recording for the feature Turbulência (Turbulence), a romantic comedy directed by Tiago Venâncio. She played Paula, one of the four protagonists, and recorded the song "Fall My Way" with singer Kevin White. The film was released on September 15, 2016.

On December 2, 2015, Blanco released the promotional single "Eu e o Tempo" ("Me and Time") and an autobiographical e-book to promote the release of her first solo album. She also sold collectibles in a campaign to promote and fund her tour. A second promotional single, "O Mundo Todo" (The Whole World), was released on December 25, and on February 27 the first official single "Perde Tudo" (Lose Everything). On March 5 (her 29th birthday), Blanco ended the campaign with 102% of her funding goal.

On March 21, Blanco sent fans who had supported her a digital version of her first studio album, Mão No Sonho (Hand In The Dream). The album includes the participation of her brothers in the song "Gosto do Amanhã", by fellow Rebeldes-member Micael Borges in "Vem Não Vem", and singer Gugu Peixoto, in the song "Tanto". Following the promotional tour, Blanco officially released Mão No Sonho on September 2, with a music video released on September 9.

== Death ==
Blanco died from intestinal cancer on October 18, 2026 in Rio de Janeiro at the age of 39.

== Filmography ==
=== Television ===
Television
| Year | Title | Role | Ref. |
|---|---|---|---|
| 2008 | Três Irmãs | Bia | |
| 2009 | Malhação | Joe | |
| 2010 | TV Globinho | Herself, TV host | |
| 2010 | Aventuras do Didi | Grace | |
| 2011–12 | Rebelde | Roberta Messi | |
| 2012 | Rebeldes para Sempre | Herself, TV documentary | |
| 2013–14 | Pecado Mortal | Silvinha | |
| 2017 | A Força do Querer | Anita | |
| 2018 | Popstar | Herself, singer | |
| 2019 | Homens? | Maria | |

=== Film ===
Film
| Year | Title | Role | Ref. |
|---|---|---|---|
| 2011 | Soulbound | Taila | |
| 2016 | Turbulência | Paula | |
| 2019 | Socorro, Virei Uma Garota! | Renata | |

=== Theater ===
Theater
| Year | Title | Role | Ref. |
|---|---|---|---|
| 2008 | Romeu & Isolda | Isolda | |
| 2009–10 | O Despertar da Primavera | Mariana | |
| 2013 | Stand Up | Anne | |
| 2013 | As Coisas Que Fizemos e Não Fizemos | Paula | |
| 2013 | Tudo Por um Popstar | Herself | |
| 2014 | Se Eu Fosse Você – O Musical | Bia | |
| 2014 | Deu Branco | Herself | |
| 2015 | 5 Contra 1 | Herself | |
| 2015–16 | Primeiro Sinal | Nina | |

== Discography ==
=== Albums ===
Studio albums
| Year | Album details | Ref. |
|---|---|---|
| 2004 | É Natal (Família Blanco): Gravadora: Sony Music | |
| 2011 | Rebeldes | |
| 2011 | Rebelde (ao vivo) | |
| 2012 | Meu Jeito, Seu Jeito (Rebeldes) | |
| 2016 | Mão no Sonho: Lançamento: September 2, 2016; Gravadora: Coqueiro Verde Records | |
| 2020 | Pretérito Imperfeito (Lágrima Flor) | |
| 2023 | Lua Blanco e a Órbita | |

=== Singles ===
Singles
| Year | Title | Music video | Album | Ref. |
|---|---|---|---|---|
| 2011 | Do Jeito Que Eu Sou | Yes | Rebeldes | |
| 2016 | Perde Tudo | Yes | Mão no Sonho | |
| 2016 | Eu e o Tempo | Yes | Mão no Sonho | |
| 2021 | Voltei | lyric video | single Lágrima Flor | |
| 2022 | Lunática | Yes | Lua Blanco e a Órbita | |
| 2022 | Ready-Set-Go | lyrics video | Lua Blanco e a Órbita | |
| 2023 | A Virada | Yes | Lua Blanco e a Órbita | |
| 2023 | Melt Your Heart | lyric video | Lua Blanco e a Órbita | |

Promotional singles
| Year | Title | Music video | Album | Ref. |
|---|---|---|---|---|
| 2015 | Eu e o Tempo | Yes | Mão no Sonho | |
| 2015 | O Mundo Todo | No | Mão no Sonho | |

== Awards and nominations ==
| Year | Award | Category | Nominated work | Result | Ref. |
|---|---|---|---|---|---|
| 2011 | Brazil Capricho Awards | National Singer (Cantora Nacional) | Rebeldes | Winner | |
| 2011 | Brazil Capricho Awards | Best National Actress (Melhor Atriz Nacional) | Roberta Messi in Rebelde | Winner | |
| 2011 | Brazil Capricho Awards | Best Kiss From Fiction (Melhor Beijo De Ficção) | Roberta Messi in Rebelde | Winner | |
| 2011 | Brazil Capricho Awards | Real Couple (Casal Real) | Roberta Messi in Rebelde | Winner | |
| 2011 | Brazil UOL PopTevê | Newcomer actress (Atriz Revelação) | Roberta Messi in Rebelde | Winner | |
| 2011 | Brazil Prêmio Extra de Televisão | Female Newcomer (Revelação Feminina) | Roberta Messi in Rebelde | Nominee | |
| 2012 | Brazil Prêmio Contigo! de TV | Newcomer TV (Revelação da TV) | Roberta Messi in Rebelde | Nominee | |
| 2012 | Brazil Meus Prêmios Record | Best Teen Actress (Melhor Atriz Adolescente) | Roberta Messi in Rebelde | Winner | |
| 2012 | Brazil Prêmio Arte Qualidade Brasil | Newcomer Actress (Atriz Revelação) | Roberta Messi in Rebelde | Nominee | |
| 2012 | Brazil Meus Prêmios Nick | Favorite Actress (Atriz Favorita) | Roberta Messi in Rebelde | Nominee | |
| 2012 | Brazil Melhores Do Ano NT | Best Teen Actress (Melhor Atriz Adolescente) | Roberta Messi in Rebelde | Winner | |
| 2012 | Brazil Prêmio Extra de Televisão | Teen Idol (Ídolo Teen) | Roberta Messi in Rebelde | Nominee | |
| 2012 | Brazil Capricho Awards | Best Kiss from Fiction (Melhor Beijo da Ficção) | Roberta Messi in Rebelde | Winner | |
| 2012 | Brazil Capricho Awards | National Singer (Cantora Nacional) | Rebeldes | Winner | |
| 2013 | US Shorty Awards | Brazil | Herself | Nominee | |
| 2013 | US Shorty Awards | Future Celebrity | Herself | Nominee | |
| 2013 | Brazil Troféu Imprensa | Best Telenovela Actress (Melhor Atriz de Novela) | Roberta Messi in Rebelde | Nominee | |
| 2013 | Brazil Trans Brasil TV | Best Singer, Best Actress | Herself | Winner | |
| 2013 | Brazil Premio Jovem | Best Clipe (Melhor Clipe) | Herself | Winner | |
| 2013 | Brazil Login Teen Awards | Favorite Instagram (Instagram Favorito) | Herself | Winner | |
| 2014 | USA Shorty Awards | Brazil | Herself | Nominee | |
| 2014 | USA Shorty Awards | Actress | Herself | Nominee | |
| 2014 | USA Shorty Awards | Celebrity | Herself | Nominee | |
| 2014 | USA Shorty Awards | Singer | Herself | Nominee | |
| 2014 | USA Shorty Awards | Music | Herself | Nominee | |
| 2014 | USA Shorty Awards | Instagrammer | Herself | Nominee | |
| 2014 | USA Shorty Awards | Vox Populi | Herself | Winner | |
| 2014 | Brazil Prêmio Jovem Brasileiro | Youth of the Year (Jovem do Ano) | Herself | Winner | |
| 2015 | US Shorty Awards | Brazil | Herself | Nominee | |
| 2015 | Brazil Prêmio Jovem Brasileiro | Best Theatrical Show (Melhor Espetáculo Teatral) | Primeiro Sinal | Winner | |
| 2015 | Brazil Prêmio Jovem Brasileiro | Best Twitter (Melhor Twitter) | @lua_blanco | Nominee | |
| 2015 | Brazil Prêmio Jovem Brasileiro | Youth of the Year (Jovem do ano) | Herself | Nominee | |
| 2015 | Brazil Prêmio Jovem Brasileiro | Best Actress (Melhor Atriz) | Herself | Nominee | |
| 2015 | Brazil Prêmio Jovem Brasileiro | Best Singer (Melhor Cantora) | Herself | Nominee | |
