= Flores (disambiguation) =

Flores (from Portuguese 'flowers') is an Indonesian island in the Lesser Sunda archipelago.

Flores may also refer to:

== People ==
- Flores (surname)

== Places ==
- Flores, Buenos Aires, Argentina, a neighborhood
- Flores, Pernambuco, Brazil
- Flores Island (British Columbia), Canada
- Flores Canton, Costa Rica
- Flores, El Petén, Guatemala, a departmental capital
- Flores Costa Cuca, Guatemala
- Flores Sea, Indonesia
- Flores, Los Santos, Panama
- Flores Island (Azores), Portugal
- Flores Department, Uruguay
- Isla de Flores, Uruguayan island

== Other uses ==
- Flores (company), a company in Serbia
- Flores (TransMilenio), a bus station in Bogotá, Colombia
- Flores (Mexibús, Line 4), a bus station in Tecámac, Mexico
- "Flores" (song), a song by Brazilian band Titãs
- "Flores" (Sophia song), a song by Brazilian artist Sophia
- Reno v. Flores, a 1993 Supreme Court of the US case also known as the Flores Settlement
- Flores, Dutch gunboat.

== See also ==
- Las Flores (disambiguation)
