= Las Flores =

Las Flores can refer to:

== Places ==
- Las Flores, Buenos Aires, Argentina
- Las Flores Partido, Buenos Aires Province, Argentina
- Las Flores, Rosario, Argentina
- Las Flores, Belize, Belize
- Las Flores, Lempira, Honduras
- Las Flores (archaeological site), archaeological site in Tampico, Mexico
- Las Flores, California, United States of America
- Las Flores, Tehama County, California, United States of America
- Las Flores, Maldonado, a village in Uruguay
- Las Flores, Rivera, a village in Uruguay
- Las Flores (Mexibús, Line 3), a BRT station in Chimalhuacán, Mexico
- Las Flores (Mexibús, Line 4), a BRT station in Tecámac, Mexico
- Las Flores Zacuautitla (Mexibús), a BRT station in Coacalco de Berriozábal, Mexico

== Other ==
- Las Flores Handicap, American horse race

== See also ==
- Flores (disambiguation)
