= Rebelde Way (Portuguese TV series) =

Portuguese telenovela

- Genre: Teen telenovela
- Country of origin: Portugal
- Original language: Portuguese

Production
- Running time: 45 minutes

Original release
- Network: SIC
- Release: August 25, 2008 – July 16, 2009

Related
- Rebelde Way (2002); Remix; Corazón rebelde Rebelde (2011); Rebelde (2022)

Rebelde Way (lit. Rebel Way) is a Portuguese youth telenovela broadcast on SIC based on an Argentine soap opera of the same name.

== Cast ==
- Joana Anes as Mia Rossi
- Joana Alvarenga as Elisabete "Lisa" Marie Valentino Scott
- Nelson Antunes as Manuel Guerreiro
- Tiago Barroso as Pedro Silva Lobo
- Ana Rita Tristão as Íris Fernandes
- Hélder Agapito as Guilherme "Gui" Carlos Silva
- Maria Albergaria as Frederica "Kika" Vasconcelos
- Marco Medeiros as Gabriel Pereira
- Joana Santos as Vitória "Vicky" Paz
- Tiago Aldeia as Marco Aguiar
- Joana Cotrim as Elsa Lima
- Tomás Alves as Tomás Moreira
- Inês Aires Pereira as Paula Castelão
- João Godinho as Rodrigo Salavisa
- Raquel Strada as Sofia Bragança
- Francisco Froes as Álvaro Manso
- Diogo Martins as António "Toni/Alergias" Marques
- Jani Zhao as Hoshi Kyoko
- Diogo Ferreira as Luís Miguel "Gordo" Ferreira
- Ana Marta Ferreira as Milagros "Mili" Perez
