= Surelee Joseph =

Indian television actress and model (born 1986)

- Born: 21 April 1986 (age 40); India
- Occupation: Model
- Spouse: Sujal Shah

Surelee Joseph is an Indian television actress and model.

Joseph grew up in Bombay, India and studied English literature in college. She began acting when she was 19 years old, playing the role of Maria Priya, a tomboyish catholic orphan on the television series Remix. The show launched the Star One channel on 1 November 2004, and ran for two years.

After her stint with the show, Joseph began modeling.
