= Fiesta (Denise Rosenthal album) =

Studio album by Denise Rosenthal
- Released: November 6, 2013; November 13, 2013 (Digital edition)
- Recorded: 2011−2013 in Santiago, Chile
- Genre: Pop, dance-pop, Latin pop
- Label: Independent
- Producer: Bastián Herrera, Marcelo Mora, Felipe Elgueta

Denise Rosenthal chronology
Fiesta (2013)	Cambio de Piel (2017)

Singles from Fiesta
- 1. "I Wanna Give My Heart" Released: November 21, 2011; 2. "Just Better Alone" Released: May 18, 2012; 3. "Dance" Released: September 12, 2012; 4. "Fiesta" Released: September 8, 2013; 5. "Revolution" Released: August 18, 2014; 6. "Turn it up" Released: December 18, 2014

Fiesta is the debut solo album by Chilean singer-songwriter Denise Rosenthal. It was available for physical release in Chile on November 6, 2013 via FeriaMix Santiago. On November 8, 2013, the album was available to purchase digitally in iTunes in the United States, Chile, and the rest of Latin America. Rosenthal released the album under the stage name, "D-Niss".

== Production ==
D-Niss began recording songs for the album as early as 2011. The album is D-Niss's first release as a solo artist. Her previous discography included albums from telenovelas where she portrayed a character. The album includes 11 Spanglish songs all written or co-written by D-Niss. It is a fusion of pop, urban and R & B influences. D-Niss worked on the album in Santiago for eight months with help from producer Bastián Herrera. D-Niss rerecorded her vocals from the single, Just Better Alone for the album.

== Promotion ==
The album's first official single, "I Wanna Give My Heart" was released to Chilean radio stations in November 2011.It was released on iTunes in Chile on November 21, 2012. A music video was shot in Santiago and Pirque, Chile and released on YouTube on November 30, 2011. The lyrics were written by D-Niss and composed by Neven Ilic.

On May 18, 2012, D-Niss's second official single, "Just Better Alone", was premiered online in Chile by La Tercera.cl. In September 2012, D-Niss released her third official single, "Dance" featuring the Chilean hip-hop group Crossfire. The single was written by Rosenthal.

The album's fourth single and title track, "Fiesta", was released on September 8, 2013 on iTunes for the U.S. and Chile. The song was written by D-Niss and Bastián Herrera. A music video was filmed in Santiago, Chile and subsequently released on D-Niss's official YouTube channel on October 23, 2013.

On 2014, D-Niss released two new official singles "Revolution", a controversy music video filmed in Santiago; and "Turn it up" featuring the Chilean hip-hop group La Pozze Latina.

The album debuted at number 2 on FeriaMix's album chart.

== Track listing ==
No.	Title	Writer(s)	{{{extra_column}}}	Length
1.	"Revolution"	D-Niss, Herrera		4:08
2.	"Love Me"	D-Niss, Herrera		3:54
3.	"Just Better Alone"	D-Niss, Neven Ilic		3:18
4.	"Turn It Up (featuring La Pozze Latina)"	D-Niss, Hernán Del Canto, Darwin Bustos, Víctor Vildósola		3:33
5.	"It's Over"	D-Niss, Herrera		3:39
6.	"Star"	D-Niss, Herrera		3:32
7.	"Can't Stop Me"	D-Niss, Herrera		3:25
8.	"I Wanna Give My Heart"	D-Niss, Neven Ilic		3:20
9.	"Dance (featuring Crossfire)"	D-Niss, Herrera, Rodrigo Pencheff, Cristian Pencheff, Rob		3:25
10.	"Uno En Un Millón (El Babysitter)"	D-Niss	3:30	3:43
11.	"Fiesta"	D-Niss, Herrera		4:06

== Charts ==
Chart (2013)	Peak position
Chilean Albums Chart	2
