= Rebelde (2022 TV series) =

2022 Mexican comedy-drama streaming television series

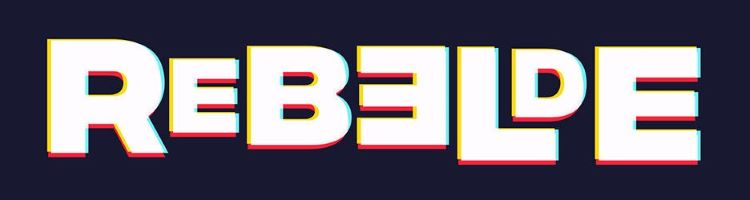
- Genre: Teen drama
- Based on: Rebelde Way by Cris Morena
- Written by: Ilse Apellaniz; José Miguel Núñez; Talia Rothenberg; Pericles Sánchez
- Directed by: Santiago Limón
- Starring: Azul Guaita; Giovanna Grigio; Sergio Mayer Mori; Andrea Chaparro; Jeronimo Cantillo; Franco Masini; Lizeth Selene; Alejandro Puente
- Country of origin: Mexico
- Original language: Spanish
- No. of seasons: 2
- No. of episodes: 16

Production
- Production companies: Woo Films; Propagate; TDO

Original release
- Network: Netflix
- Release: 5 January – 27 July 2022

Related
- Rebelde Way (2002); Rebelde (2004–06); Remix (2006); Rebelde Way (2008); Corazón rebelde (2009); Rebelde (2011)

Rebelde (English: Rebel) (stylized as REBƎLDE) is a Mexican teen drama television series directed by Santiago Limón. It is a sequel to the 2004 Mexican telenovela Rebelde, which is in turn a remake of the Argentine telenovela Rebelde Way, by Cris Morena, and is the fifth version produced worldwide. The series premiered on Netflix on 5 January 2022.

On 9 January 2022, Netflix announced the renewal of Rebelde for its second season. The second season was released on 27 July 2022. On 6 May 2023, it was announced that the series had been cancelled.

== Cast ==
=== Main ===
- Azul Guaita as Jana Gandía Cohen, a famous teen pop star who is Sebas' girlfriend and Pilar's daughter.
- Franco Masini as Luka Colucci, a snobby teen from Argentina who is the cousin of Mia Colucci.
- Sergio Mayer Mori as Estebán Torres/Estebán Colucci, a poor talented pianist from Puebla that keeps a secret.
- Andrea Chaparro as María José "MJ" Sevilla, a teen from California who’s previously only gone to all-girl schools and whose religious upbringing is tested at EWS.
- Jerónimo Cantillo as Guillermo "Dixon" Álvarez, a street-smart teen from Colombia that wants to become a successful hip-hop artist.
- Lizeth Selene as Andrea "Andi" Agosti, a recluse but nice teen with a strong personality, who plays the drums and is in love with Emilia.
- Alejandro Puente as Sebastián "Sebas" Langarica, a snob and calculating student at EWS, who is Jana's boyfriend.
- Giovanna Grigio as Emília Alo, a Brazilian student and influencer that secretly feels interested in Andi.
- Estefanía Villarreal as Directora Celina Ferrer, a former student of the EWS and close friend of Mia Colucci.
- Leonardo de Lozanne as Marcelo Colucci, the father of Luka and Estebán, and uncle of Mia.
- Karla Sofia Gazcón as Lourdes
- Pamela Almanza as Anita (season 1)
- Flavio Medina as Gustavo "Gus" Bauman (season 2), a famous music producer with a secret plan for EWS.
- Saak as Okane (season 2), a singer who lost his fame after his drug addiction.

=== Recurring ===
- Alaíde as Laura Vega
- Fernando Sujo as Alejandro
- Karla Cossío as Pilar Gandía (recurring season 1; guest season 2), mother of Jana and former student of the EWS.
- Enrique Chi as Salvador Torres (recurring season 1; guest season 2)
- Dominika Paleta as Marina de Langarica (recurring season 1; guest season 2)
- Carmen Madrid as Agustina Sevilla (season 1)
- Alex Lago as Kuri (season 1)
- Mariané Cartas as Ilse (season 2)

== Episodes ==
Season	Episodes	Originally released
1	8	January 5, 2022
2	8	July 27, 2022

=== Season 1（2022） ===
No. overall	No. in season	Title	Directed by	Written by	Original release date
1	1	"Bienvenides todes Welcome All"	Santiago Limón	Natasha Ybarra-Klor	5 January 2022
2	2	"Audiciones; Auditions"	Santiago Limón	José Miguel Núñez	5 January 2022
3	3	"Va a caer He's Going Down"	Santiago Limón	Natasha Ybarra-Klor	5 January 2022
4	4	"Simulacro; Earthquake Drill"	Santiago Limón	Pericles Sánchez	5 January 2022
5	5	"La primera vez The First Time"	Santiago Limón	José Miguel Núñez & Ilse Apellaniz	5 January 2022
6	6	"Sálvame; Save Me"	Yibrán Asuad	José Miguel Núñez, Pericles Sánchez & Ilse Apellaniz	5 January 2022
7	7	"Hasta que amanezca 'Til Dawn"	Yibrán Asuad	Natasha Ybarra-Klor	5 January 2022
8	8	"La gran final The Grand Finale"	Yibrán Asuad	Natasha Ybarra-Klor	5 January 2022

=== Season 2（2022） ===
No. overall	No. in season	Title	Directed by	Written by	Original release date
9	1	"Back to school Regreso a clases"	Yibrán Asuad	José Miguel Núñez & Santiago Limón	27 July 2022
10	2	"Ser o parecer Be or to seem"	Carlos Armella	Silvia Jiménez & Ilse Apellaniz	27 July 2022
11	3	"Let's duet! !Hagamos un dueto!"	Carlos Armella	Pericles Sánchez	27 July 2022
12	4	"Viral"	Carlos Armella	Ilse Apellaniz	27 July 2022
13	5	"El show debe continuar The Show Must Go On"	Lucero S. Novaro	Pericles Sánchez	27 July 2022
14	6	"Vuelta al sol A Trip Around The Sun"	Lucero S. Novaro	Ilse Apellaniz	27 July 2022
15	7	"Y.O.L.O."	Yibrán Asuad	Pericles Sánchez	27 July 2022
16	8	"Otro día que va Another day that goes"	Yibrán Asuad	José Miguel Núñez	27 July 2022

== Production ==
=== Development ===
In March 2021, production began in Mexico City. In May 2021, actor Sergio Mayer apologized to his cast mates and followers after his controversial statements in which he admitted to hating the band RBD, which came from Rebelde, the telenovela to which they are making a sequel.

== Marketing ==
On 22 September 2021, Netflix revealed the first official poster. On 25 September 2021, Netflix revealed the first musical video teaser. On 9 November, the first teaser trailer was released. On 7 December, the official trailer was released.

== Soundtrack ==
Rebelde la Serie (Official Soundtrack)

Soundtrack album by Rebelde la Serie
- Released: January 5, 2022
- Genre: Pop
- Length: 50:40
- Label: Sony Music

Rebelde la Serie (Official Soundtrack) is the first soundtrack of the television series, released on 5 January 2022 by Sony Music. It contains original music, as well as covers of RBD's first three singles, and of songs from Britney Spears, Selena, Jesse & Joy and Danny Ocean. The song "Rebelde" served as the lead single and promotional release of the show, and is the only track to feature the entire group. Not included on the album is the single "Salva-me (Balada Portuguesa)", which was released after the show's premiere.

No.	Title	Artist(s)	Length
1.	"Rebelde"	Azul Guaita, Sergio Mayer Mori, Andrea Chaparro, Jeronimo Cantillo, Franco Masini, Alejandro Puente, Giovanna Grigio	3:07
2.	"Pensando en Ti"	Rebelde la Serie, Andrea Chaparro, Jeronimo Cantillo	3:09
3.	"Me Rehúso"	Rebelde la Serie, Andrea Chaparro	2:54
4.	"Baby One More Time"	Rebelde la Serie, Giovanna Grigio, Alejandro Puente	3:28
5.	"Este Sentimiento"	Rebelde la Serie, Azul Guaita	4:02
6.	"Lo Que No Fue No Será"	Rebelde la Serie, Franco Masini	3:22
7.	"¡Corre!"	Rebelde la Serie, Azul Guaita, Alejandro Puente	4:30
8.	"Si Una Vez"	Rebelde la Serie, Andrea Chaparro, Jeronimo Cantillo	2:33
9.	"Sálvame"	Azul Guaita, Andrea Chaparro, Selene, Sergio Mayer Mori, Franco Masini, Jeronimo Cantillo	3:18
10.	"Volver a Mí"	Rebelde la Serie, Sergio Mayer Mori	3:30
11.	"Love"	Rebelde la Serie, Alaíde, Fernando Sujo	2:45
12.	"No Soy"	Rebelde la Serie, Azul Guaita	3:17
13.	"Solo Quédate En Silencio"	Rebelde la Serie, Giovanna Grigio, Alejandro Puente	3:22
14.	"Lo Siento"	Rebelde la Serie, Andrea Chaparro, Alejandro Puente	2:50
15.	"Sálvame [Balada]"	Azul Guaita, Andrea Chaparro, Selene, Sergio Mayer Mori, Franco Masini, Jeronimo Cantillo	3:37
Total length:			50:40
