= No Quiero Escuchar Tu Voz =

Single by Denise Rosenthal

from the album El Blog de la Feña
- Released: 26 June 2008 (Chile)
- Recorded: 2008
- Genre: Pop, teen pop, dance-pop
- Length: 2:46 (Album Version); 2:44 (Radio Version)
- Label: Feria Music
- Songwriter(s): Gonzalo Yañez
- Producer(s): Gonzalo Yañez

Denise Rosenthal singles chronology
"No Quiero Escuchar Tu Voz" (2008)	"Espérame" (2008)

"No Quiero Escuchar Tu Voz" is the debut single by Chilean singer and actress Denise Rosenthal from her first solo studio album, El Blog de la Feña, released in Chile on 9 August 2008. The song was written during 2008 by Gonzalo Yañez; this song was one of the songs most played in the radio stations on Chile in 2008.

== Music video ==
The music video for this song was directed by Juan Pablo Sanchez in Santiago, Chile. The video shows to denise filming one commercial in where she is harassed by a guy, but she not been interested one in he, here it shows to denise as the whole star but at the same time enjoying the things that she likes to do and to be with her friends. The music video was premiered in Canal 13 and later was premiered in exclusive for MTV on 28 July 2008. The video debuted at number 8 on Los 10+ Pedidos and later peaked at number 1.

== Track listing ==
Promo Single

1. "No Quiero Escuchar Tu Voz" (Radio version) – 2:44
2. "No Quiero Esccuhar Tu Voz" (Album version) – 2:46
3. "Porque Tú" (Non-album track) – 2:46
