= Sophia (Sophia Abrahão EP) =

EP by Sophia
- Released: July 14, 2014
- Recorded: 2014
- Genre: Pop
- Length: 11:57
- Label: Independent
- Producer: Rique Azevedo

Sophia chronology
Sophia (2014)	Sophia Abrahão (2015)

Singles from Sophia
- 1. "Deixa Estar" Released: June 9, 2014; 2. "No Final" Released: January 9, 2015; 3. "Tudo Que Eu Sempre Quis" Released: April 22, 2015

Sophia is the first EP namesake of the Brazilian pop singer-songwriter Sophia. Was launched in July 2014 with four tracks. Despite the artist having done contract with Sony, the work was released independently. The EP is the genre Pop.

== Track list ==
1. No Final (Sophia, Rique Azevedo, Samille Joker) – 3:28
2. Deixa Eu Gostar de Você (Lucas Silveira, Karen Jonz) – 3:54
3. Tudo Que Eu Sempre Quis (Sophia, Rique Azevedo) – 2:37
4. Deixa Estar (Sophia, Gustavo Pagan, Rique Azevedo, João Milliet) – 2:38

== Release history ==
Region	Date	Format	Label
Brazil	July 14, 2014	Digital download	Independent
