= Remix (TV series) =

- Remix stars during their album release, December 2005
- Genre: Teen drama
- Created by: Rose Audio Visuals
- Based on: Rebelde Way
- Written by: Barnali Shukla; Bhavna Kapoor; Radhika Anand; shikha aleya; Suyash Khabya; Smita Nair Jain
- Directed by: Bhooshan Patel; Iqbaal Rizzvi; Jaggi; Tamara P. Nedungadi; Rohit Malhotra
- Creative directors: Ritu Bhatia (episodes 1–123); Sandhya Ramachandran (episode 124–348)
- Starring: Priya Wal; Raj Singh Arora; Shweta Gulati; Karan Wahi; Kunal Karan Kapoor
- Music by: Pritam, Vikesh Mehta
- Country of origin: India
- Original language: Hindi
- No. of episodes: 348

Production
- Producers: Shrishti Arya; Goldie Behl
- Camera setup: Multi-camera
- Running time: 45 minutes (season 1); 25 minutes (season 2)

Original release
- Network: STAR One
- Release: 1 November 2004 – 20 July 2006

Related
- Rebelde Way (2002); Rebelde (2004); Rebelde Way (2008); Corazón rebelde Rebelde (2011); Rebelde (2022)

Remix is an Indian teen drama television series produced by Rose Audio Visuals, which aired on STAR One. The series is a remake of the Argentine soap opera Rebelde Way. (Note: Rebelde Way#International remakes) It appeared from 1 November 2004 to 20 July 2006.

== Synopsis ==
The story is based on the lives of 12th-grade students in an elite school called Maurya High. The school servesthe rich and famous, and scholarship students from poorer families.

The four main characters are Tia Ahuja (the only daughter of fashion entrepreneur Sumit Ahuja), Anvesha Ray Banerjee (the only daughter of Bollywood filmstar Sonia Ray), Yuvraaj Dev (the brat son of Indian politician Yashwant Dev), and Ranveer Sisodia (from a middle-class Rajasthani family who comes to Maurya to avenge the death of his father with Sumit Ahuja). They form the music group "Remix" and become the singing sensation of the decade.

As the show progresses, two main relationships develop. Tia and Ranveer become attracted to each other and begin dating. Ashi and Yuvi also begin a love/hate relationship. Throughout the series, they go through various fights and misunderstandings.

The show ends with Tia and Anvesha becoming step-sisters as their parents Sumit Ahuja and Sonia Ray plan to get married. Ashi and Yuvi reconcile and resolve their differences. Tia and Ranveer also recognize their love for each other and end up happily together.

== Cast ==
=== Main ===
- Priya Wal as Anvesha "Ashi" Ray Banerjee
- Raj Singh Arora as Yuvraaj "Yuvi" Dev
- Shweta Gulati as Tia Ahuja
- Karan Wahi as Ranveer Sisodia

=== Recurring ===
Character	Actor
Meher Dastoor	Anu Sinha / Bijal Batavia
Priyanka (Pri)	Archana Malkani
Nakul Agarwal	Habib Mithiborwala
Shayam Ram	Sachin Khurana
Siddharth (Sid)	Gaurav Gupta
Amandeep Chadha (Aman)	Saurabh Raj Jain
Varun	Kunal Karan Kapoor
Maria Priya (M.P)	Surelee Joseph
Vrinda Bhatt	Sakshi Talwar
Latika Jambhwal	Mansee Deshmukh
Arjun Khanna	Siddhanth Karnick
Aditya	Karan Veer Mehra
Yamini	Benaf Dadachandji
Ira	Arunima Sharma
Saahil Shah	Bharat Arora
Reva	Malavika Rane
Asim Dastoor	Ashish Sharma
Karan	Jay Soni
Vikram	Arjun Bijlani
Shyla Seth	Rujutha Shah
Raghu Deshpande	Soham Master
Soniya Ray	Sonia Kapoor
Kuki	Smita Singh
Sumeet Ahuja	Vinay Jain
Yashwant Dev	Pankaj Berry
Raghav Dutt	Anoop Soni
Ashish Jambhwal	Lalit Parimoo
Shanti Sharma	Usha Bachani
Pallavi Mehta	Kavita Kaushik
Puneet Ahuja	Vishal Puri
Vipul Khanna	Ayub Khan
Debashish Mitra	Manav Gohil
Leo	Harsh Somaiya
Ayesha	Dimple Inamdar
Shashank	Manoj Bidwai
Chi Chi	Manini De
Sonal (Massi)	Gulfam Khan

=== Guest appearances ===
- Bappi Lahiri
- Malaika Arora
- Aasma
- Arshad Warsi
- Dino Morea

== Soundtrack ==
The soundtrack of the show was sung by the Channel V band, Aasma. Music was provided by Jeet Ganguly, Vikesh Mehta and Pritam with lyrics by Peyush Dixit and Aamir Ali. The album was released on 8 December 2005. However, most of the tunes were released on the show before the album launch, excepting Boom.

Starone Remix

Soundtrack album by Aasma
- Released: 8 December 2005
- Genre: TV Series Music Album
- Length: 34:28
- Label: Times Music
- Producer: Shrishti Arya; Goldie Behl

Track listing
No.	Title	Music	Artist(s)	Length
1.	"Dil Ki Yeh Dhadkan"	Gaurav Issar, Peyush Dixit	Aasma	3:57
2.	"Remix"	Peyush Dixit	Aasma (Rap by BlaaZe)	4:12
3.	"Mast Mast"	Vikesh Mehta, Peyush Dixit	Aasma (Rap by Mc Sensor)	3:48
4.	"Love Station"	Naresh-Paresh, Peyush Dixit	Aasma (Rap by Bob)	4:35
5.	"Boom"	Deep	Aasma	3:46
6.	"Baad Mein Jahan"	Vikesh Mehta, Peyush Dixit	Aasma	4:04
7.	"Dance Dance"	Bappi Lahiri	Aasma, Bappi Lahiri	5:54
8.	"Dance Dance" (The Bappa mix)	Bappi Lahiri	Aasma, Bappi Lahiri	4:12
