= El Blog de la Feña =

Studio album by Denise Rosenthal
- Released: August 9, 2008
- Recorded: 2007–2008
- Genre: Pop, teen pop, dance-pop
- Length: 30:07
- Label: Feria Music
- Producer: Mariano Pavéz, Cristian Heyne, Gonzalo Yañez, Juan Ignacio Vicente, Marilú Paolini, Carmen Gloria, Kara DioGuardi

Denise Rosenthal chronology
El Blog de la Feña (2008)	El Blog de la Feña 2 (2009)

Singles from El Blog de la Feña
- 1. "No Quiero Escuchar Tu Voz" Released: June 26, 2008; 2. "Espérame" Released: August 1, 2008; 3. "Amiga" Released: November 4, 2008; 4. "La Vida Sin Tí" Released: February 18, 2009

El Blog de la Feña is the debut album by the Chilean actress and singer Denise Rosenthal. The album was released on August 14, 2008, in Chile via Feria Music, the first and lead single of the album was "No Quiero Escuchar Tu Voz" .

== Track listing ==
1. "Si tu me Quieres" (Gonzalo Yañez) – 3:04
2. "No Quiero Escuchar Tu Voz" (Gonzalo Yañez) – 2:46
3. "Hasta Las 6" (Gonzalo Yañez, Monk&Trot) – 3:19
4. "Amiga" (Denise Rosenthal, Liselotte Schalchili) – 3:51
5. "Espérame" (Arturo Fontaine, Hector Fontaine) – 2:53
6. "La Vida Sin Tí" (Gonzalo Yañez) – 3:10
7. "Esta Vez" (Arturo Fontaine, Hector Fontaine) – 2:55
8. "Te He Vuelto a Encontrar" (Arturo Fontaine, Hector Fontaine) – 2:32
9. "Creo" (Arturo Fontaine, Hector Fontaine) – 3:22
10. "Bye Bye" (Monk&Trot) – 3:18 saires nado sguel
11. "Déjate Llevar" (Gonzalo Yañez) – 2:48
