= Cambio de Piel (Denise Rosenthal album) =

Studio album by Denise Rosenthal
- Released: December 6, 2017
- Genre: Pop
- Length: 33:39
- Label: Universal Music Chile
- Producer: Marcelo Aldunate (exec.); Denise Rosenthal; Lorena Gormez; Guillermo Scherping; Danilo Donoso; Lego Moustache; Andrés Landon; Bruno Borlone

Denise Rosenthal chronology
Fiesta (2013)	Cambio de Piel (2017)

Singles from Cambio de Piel
- 1. "Cambio de Piel" Released: November 25, 2016; 2. "Isidora" Released: September 1, 2017; 3. "Cabello de Ángel" Released: January 25, 2018; 4. "Lucha en Equilibrio" Released: August 16, 2018; 5. "Encadená" Released: November 22, 2018

Cambio de Piel is the second studio album and major label debut by Chilean singer-songwriter Denise Rosenthal. It was released on December 6, 2017 by Universal Music Chile. It was preceded by two singles, the lead-single of the same name and the ballad "Isidora".

== Release ==
The album was released on December 6, 2017.

== Singles ==
"Cambio de Piel" was released as the album's lead-single on November 25, 2016. Its music video, was released on December 6, 2016.

"Isidora" was released as the second single from the album on September 1, 2017. Its music video, was released on August 31, 2017. It was directed by Claudia Huaiquimilla.

"Cabello de Ángel" was released as the third single from the album on January 25, 2018. A music video was released on the same day and shows the singer dancing in different places and singing in front of a blue background wearing a flower crown.

"Lucha en Equilibrio" was announced as a single on early June by the singer during a live performance in tv.

== Track listing ==
Credits adapted from qobuz.com

No.	Title	Lyrics	Music	Length
1.	"Rododendro"	Denise Rosenthal	Rosenthal; Lorena Gormez	1:30
2.	"Cambio de Piel"	Rosenthal; Martina Lecaros	Marcelo Aldunate	3:37
3.	"Lucha en Equilibrio"	Rosenthal; Guillermo Scherping	Scherping	3:41
4.	"Luna"	Rosenthal; Bastián Herrera	Danilo Donoso; Lego Moustache	3:26
5.	"Isidora"	Rosenthal; Herrera	Aldunate	3:49
6.	"Niñita de Mar" (feat. Jonas Sanche)	Rosenthal	Donoso; Moustache	4:13
7.	"Cabello de Ángel"	Rosenthal; Andrés Landon	Landon	3:26
8.	"Encadená"	Rosenthal; Herrera	Donoso; Moustache	3:17
9.	"Amor con Amor Se Paga" (feat. Nicole ZC)	Rosenthal; Bruno Borlone	Rosenthal; Borlone	3:28
10.	"El Reflejo de Mi Amor"	Rosenthal	Donoso; Moustache	3:17
Total length:				33:39

== Certifications ==
Region	Certification
Chile	4× Platinum
