= Soulbound =

2011 film directed by Caio Sóh

- Directed by: Caio Sóh
- Screenplay by: Caio Sóh
- Produced by: Luana Lobo and Bia Basilio
- Starring: Emilio Dantas; Remo Rocha; Paloma Duarte
- Cinematography: Othon Castro
- Music by: Maycon Ananias; Maria Gadú; Aureo Gandur
- Production company: Lobo Filmes
- Release dates: April 27, 2011 (Los Angeles Brazilian Film Festival); August 9, 2011 (Brazil)
- Running time: 105 minutes
- Country: Brazil
- Language: Portuguese

Soulbound (Portuguese: Teus Olhos Meus) is a 2011 Brazilian drama film directed and written by Caio Sóh.

The film follows the story of Gil, a 20-year-old orphan, raised by his uncles. His lifestyle generates a family war, causing Gil to go away from home. With the guitar on his back, without money and without the help of friends, Gil meets Otávio, a music producer who changes his destiny forever.

== Cast ==
- Emilio Dantas as Gil
- Remo Rocha as Otávio
- Paloma Duarte as Tia Leila
- Roberto Bomtempo as Tio César
- Jayme Matarazzo as Otávio (aged 19)
- Graziella Schmitt as Lígia (aged 19)
- Cláudio Lins as Carlos
- Juliana Lohmann as Carla
- Gustavo Novaes as Marcelo
- Gugu Peixoto as Gugu

Also

- Lua Blanco as Taila
- Marcelo Mello as Caju
