= Alejandro Puente =

Mexican actor, writer and director

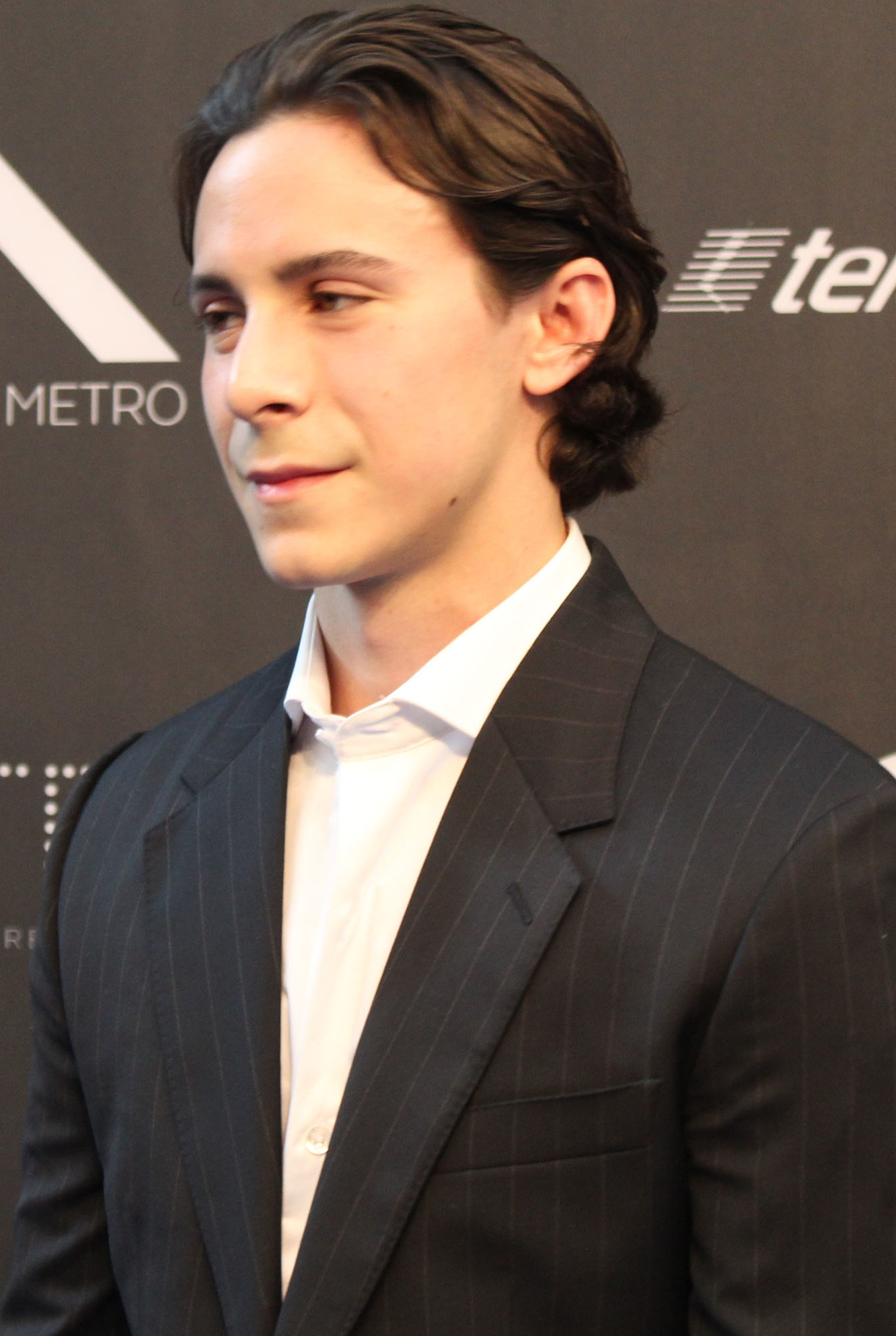
- Puente in 2019
- Occupations: Actor; writer; director
- Years active: 2015–present

Alejandro Puente is a Mexican actor, writer and director. He is best known in his native country on stage for his role of Todd Anderson in the Mexican play adaptation Dead Poets Society, a play starring Alfonso Herrera. Although previously he debuted on television in the series El Dandy.

== Career ==
Puente in his short career as a director and writer has produced two films; Adiós, Hamburgo (2018), and Verónica (2017). He also starred in the play Yo soy Dios (2015). He studied acting at the National School of Theater Art in Mexico. In New York, United States he was a disciple of Darren Aronofsky, famous director and screenwriter. He played Santiago, a gay teenager, in the Netflix series The Club released in November 2019. He starred as Sebastián "Sebas" Langarica in the 2022 series Rebelde, the Netflix reboot and sequel to the 2004 Mexican telenovela of the same name.
