= Denise Rosenthal =

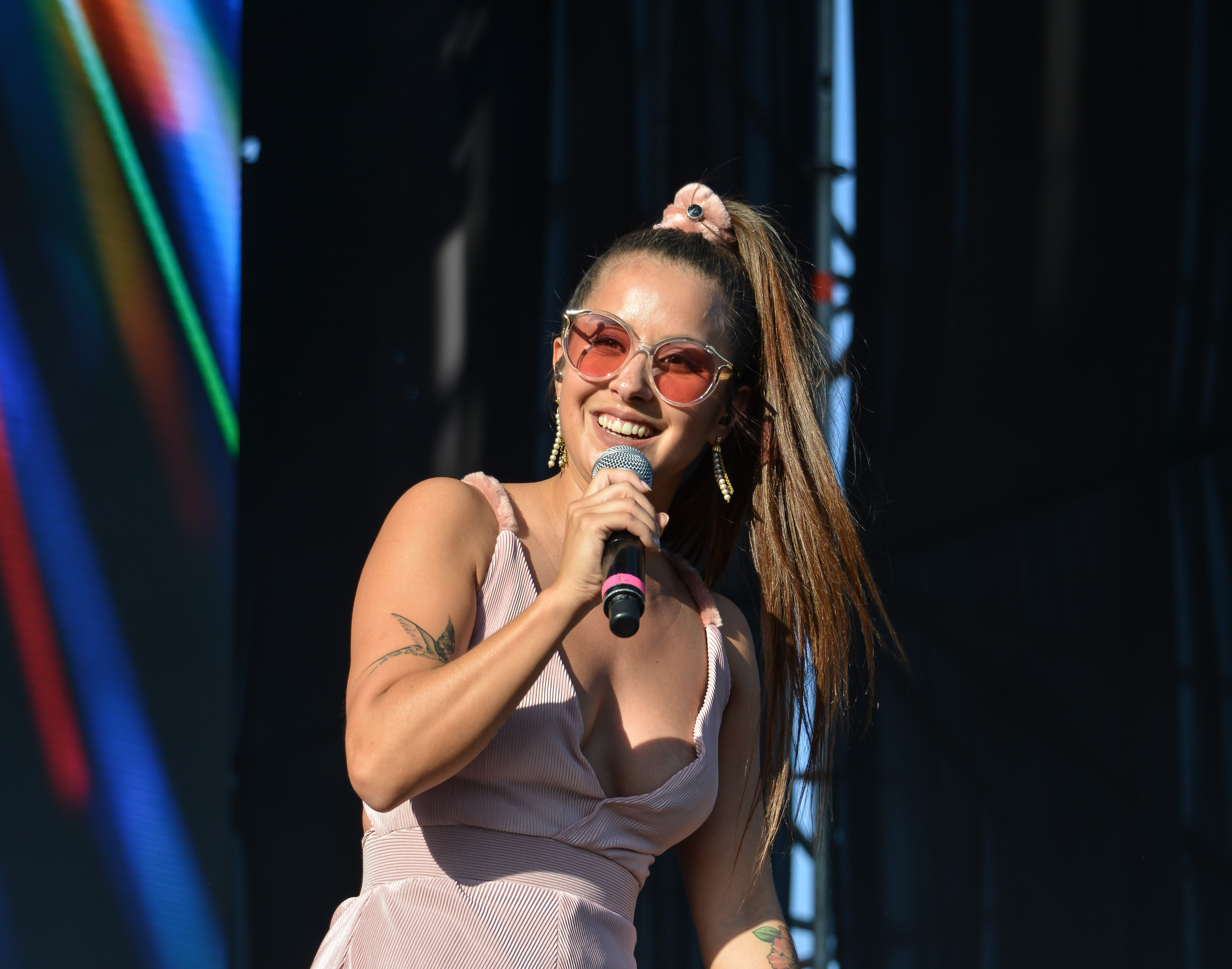

Background information
- Also known as: D-Niss
- Born: Denise Sofía Rosenthal Schalchli; 8 November 1990 (age 35); Santiago, Chile
- Genres: Pop
- Occupations: Singer; songwriter
- Years active: 2007–present
- Labels: Feria Music (2007-2010), Independent (2010-2015), Universal Music (2016 - present)
- Website: https://deniserosenthal.com

Denise Sofía Rosenthal Schalchli (born 8 November 1990), known professionally as Denise Rosenthal is a Chilean singer and songwriter.

== Early life ==
Rosenthal was born in Santiago, Chile. She has two brothers, one sister, and is the youngest of four children. Her mother, Liselotte, is an industrial designer, and her father, Christian, works in ceramics. When Rosenthal was eight years old, her parents separated. She studied at Santiago College, a bi-lingual private school in Providencia, Santiago, Chile. While attending school, Rosenthal stated she was bullied because her family was not wealthy. Rosenthal currently lives in Santiago.

== Acting career ==
In 2006, Rosenthal began her television career as a member of the successful Canal 13 Chilean tween musical series, Amango, playing "Maria Fernanda Mc Gellar" better known as "Feña". The series premiered on 16 June 2007, and ended on September 1, 2007. In Amango, Rosenthal participated also as one of the members of the telenovela's pop group of the same name. The band successfully released three albums with the music used in the show.

The second season of Amango began filming at the end of 2007. It premiered on 28 March 2008, and ended in June 2008. Rosenthal also filmed Amango: The Tour in 2008. This documentary featured the cast members of "Amango" as they prepared and promoted the series while on a national tour throughout Chile. Following the success of her participation in Amango, Canal 13 commissioned a spin-off series called El Blog de la Feña. Rosenthal reprised her role as "Feña"; the program allowed viewers to vote for the next storyline using text message voting. It was released in June 2008 and received high ratings on Canal 13 in 2 timeslots.

In 2009, Rosenthal portrayed Martina Valdivieso Rey in Corazón Rebelde, the Chilean remake of the popular 2002 Argentine telenovela, Rebelde Way. Rosenthal also took part in the telenovela's spin-off band, CRZ: Corazón Rebelde. In 2010, she travelled to Buenos Aires, Argentina to study acting, dance and voice for six months. She returned to Santiago following the conclusion of her classes. Rosenthal made her film debut in the comedy-drama, El Limpiapiscinas in July 2011.

At the end of 2011, she began filming for two acting projects. The film, El Babysitter, was released in cinemas in Chile on 24 January 2013. In April 2012, Rosenthal made her theatre debut as Paz in the Chilean Broadway-style musical, Que Cante La Vida. Performances began on 7 June 2012, at Teatro Municipal de Las Condes in Santiago, Chile.

In April 2013, after taking a four-year break from television projects as a protagonist, Rosenthal announced that she had been cast as "Jessica Lorca", a character in the web page of Chilean television network MEGA's and Etc TV newest program, Chico reality. Filming for the television series began in Chile on April 22, 2013. The series is expected to air sometime in 2014.

At the end of 2011 and for part of the 2012, Rosenthal also participated in the teen television series, El Nuevo, for TVN in Chile. Although filmed in 2011, the television series, El Nuevo aired special preview on July 4, 2013, for TVN in Chile. The program began airing Monday through Friday on 8 July 2013, and finish on 26 July 2013, for TVN in Chile. Two ages after, Rosenthal acting in the telenovela of TVN, Matriarcas in the role of Sandra Bravo Peñaloza. In January 2016, Rosenthal made her theatre as Princesa Jazz in the Mall Plaza's Chilean musical Aladino, el musical, based on the Disney's movie Aladdín.

== Music career ==
=== Early career and telenovela soundtracks (2008-2010) ===
Rosenthal showed an interest in music at a young age. She recorded her first CD consisting of four songs called Renacer in 2006, but it was never released to the public. Rosenthal participated in the Amango and Amango 2 soundtracks in 2007 and 2008, as well as a Christmas album called Amango: Villancicos. In June 2008, Rosenthal released her first solo single, "No Quiero Escuchar Tu Voz", as part of the promotion for her TV series El Blog de la Feña; the song reached number 8 in Top 100 Chile.

At the end of 2010, following the completion of her role in the Chilean telenovela Corazón Rebelde and the band CRZ: Corazón Rebelde, Rosenthal began working on her first solo album, featuring music of her own composition.

=== Solo career and debut album (2011-2015) ===
In May 2011, Rosenthal released her solo promotional single, "Men", a controversial cover version of Gladys Knight's 1991 single. In November of the same year, Rosenthal released her first single, "I Wanna Give My Heart". The lyrics were written by Rosenthal and composed by Neven Ilic. On May 18, 2012, Rosenthal's second official single, "Just Better Alone", was premiered online in Chile by La Tercera.cl.

In September 2012, Rosenthal released her third official single, "Dance" featuring the Chilean hip-hop group Crossfire. The single was written by Rosenthal. In March 2013, Rosenthal announced that her first album as a solo artist was expected to be released in Chile sometime in April. She revealed that the album is a mixture of urban, pop and R&B influences.

Rosenthal released her debut album, Fiesta, on November 6, 2013. Rosenthal released her album under the stage name "D-Niss". The album contains 11 "Spanglish" songs written or co-written by Rosenthal. Physical copies were available exclusively for FeriaMix Santagio in Chile. The album was released digitally on iTunes on November 8, 2013, for the United States and Chile. The album is available to stream for free on Rosenthal's official SoundCloud account. Rosenthal worked on the album for eight months in Santiago, Chile.

In May 2014, Rosenthal announced that the fifth single from her solo album would be "Revolution". She partially filmed a music video for the single in Santiago later that month. After she suffered a neck injury in minor car accident, production was delayed. After spending a few weeks to recover, Rosenthal completed production on the music video in July 2014. To promote the single, Rosenthal surprised fans by performing at a metro station in Santiago with a flash mob of 30 dancers. The controversial music video for "Revolution" was released following an exclusive live acoustic concert, which streamed online for Movistar Chile, on August 18, 2014.

=== Second album Cambio de Piel (2015-present) ===
The album Cambio de Piel was released on December 6, 2017. "Cambio de Piel" was released as the album's lead-single on November 25, 2016. Its music video, was released on December 6, 2016. The second single, "Isidora" was released on September 1, 2017. Its music video, was released on August 31, 2017. It was directed by Claudia Huaiquimilla. The other songs released were "Cabello de Ángel" on January 25, 2018. A music video was released on the same day and shows the singer dancing in different places and singing in front of a blue background wearing a flower crown, "Lucha en Equilibrio" and "Encadená".

On February 14, 2019, Rosenthal performed "Soñar de a Dos", alongside Camilo Zicavo. Five months later, on July 13, 2019, she released a song called "Agua Segura", with Spanish Mala Rodríguez. She followed this with the singles "El Amor no Duele" on August 22, "Ni un fruto" on November 28, and "Tiene Sabor" on February 20, 2020. In February 2020, Denise won the Silver and Golden Seagull after their presentation in Viña del Mar International Song Festival.

== Filmography ==
=== Television ===
Year	Project	Role	Notes
2007-2009	Amango	Maria Fernanda Mc Gellar (Feña)	Television series (Lead role/Acting debut)
2008-2009	El Blog de la Feña	Maria Fernanda Mc Gellar (Feña)	Television series (Lead role)
2009	Corazón Rebelde	Martina Valdivieso Rey	Telenovela (Series regular)
2011	Teatro de Chilevision	Kathy	Episode: "Viejo Idolo"
2013	El Nuevo	María José Ormazábal (Coté)	Television series (Recurring role)
2015	Matriarcas	Sandra Bravo Peñaloza/Sandra Santis Peñaloza	Telenovela (Recurring role)
2016	Chico Reality	Jessica Lorca (J-Lor)	Internet series (Lead role)
2016	El camionero	Marcela Flores	Telenovela (Recurring role)
2020	Viña del Mar Festival	Denise Rosenthal	Jury memberach
2020	Got Talent Chile	Denise Rosenthal	Coach
2020	La torre de Mabel	Denise Rosenthal	Telenovela (Recurring role)

=== Film ===
Year	Film	Role	Notes
2011	El Limpiapiscinas	Nicole Ivanov	Lead role (Film debut)
2013	El Babysitter	Bernardita Castro (Berna)	Lead role
2016	La Reina de las Nieves 2: El espejo encantado	Gerda	Lead role (voice)
2016	Prueba de actitud	Constanza "Cony" Belén Torres Alvarado	Lead role
2017	La Reina de las Nieves 3: Fuego y Hielo	Gerda	Lead role (voice)

=== Theatre ===
Year	Performance	Role	Notes
2012	Que cante la vida	Paz	Lead role (Theatre debut)
2016	Aladdin, The Music	Princesa Jazz	Lead role
2018	La Carta: Un Homenaje a Violeta Parra	Denise Rosenthal	Voice

== Discography ==
=== Solo artist ===
List of albums and certifications
Title	Album details	Certifications
Fiesta	Released: November 6, 2013; Formats: CD, digital download	
Cambio de Piel	Released: December 7, 2017; Formats: CD, digital download; Label: Universal Music Chile	CHL: 4× Platinum
Todas Seremos Reinas	Released: May 27, 2021; Formats: CD, digital download; Label: Universal Music Chile	
Supernova	Released: October 11, 2023; Formats: CD, digital download; Label: Universal Music Chile	

=== Singles ===
As lead artist

Year	Title	Chart	Album
Year	Title	CHI	Album
Main singles
2008	"No Quiero Escuchar Tu Voz"	8	El Blog de la Feña
2008	"Espérame"	52	El Blog de la Feña
2008	"Amiga"	—	El Blog de la Feña
2009	"La Vida Sin Ti"	84	El Blog de la Feña
2009	"Eres La Luz"	24	El Blog de la Feña 2
2010	"Las Horas"	97	El Blog de la Feña 2
2011	"Men"	30	Non-album single
2011	"I Wanna Give My Heart"	17	Fiesta
2012	"Just Better Alone"	98	Fiesta
2012	"Dance" (featuring Crossfire)	95	Fiesta
2013	"Fiesta"	50	Fiesta
2014	"Revolution"	77	Fiesta
2014	"Turn it up" (featuring La Pozze Latina)	33	Fiesta
2016	"Cambio de Piel"	27	Cambio de piel
2017	"Isidora"	19	Cambio de piel
2018	"Cabello de Angel"	64	Cambio de piel
2018	"Lucha en Equilibrio"	19	Cambio de piel
2018	"Encadená"	14	Cambio de piel
2019	"Soñarse De a Dos" (featuring Camilo Zicavo)	20	Non-album single
2019	"Agua Segura" (featuring Mala Rodriguez)	9	Todas Seremos Reinas
2019	"El Amor No Duele"	31	Todas Seremos Reinas
2019	"Ni un Fruto"	59	Todas Seremos Reinas
2020	"Tiene Sabor"	35	Todas Seremos Reinas
2020	"Amor de Madre"	25	Todas Seremos Reinas
2020	"Solo Hay Una Vida"	—	Todas Seremos Reinas
2020	"No Olvidar"	95	Todas Seremos Reinas
2020	"No Rompo Tus Fotos" (featuring Juan Solo)	—	Non-album single
2020	"Rico Rico" (featuring Los Vásquez and Moral Distraída)	30	Non-album single
2020	"Gira (El Mundo Gira)"	64	Todas Seremos Reinas
2020	"Santería" (with Lola Índigo and Danna Paola)	12	Akelarre (Edición Especial)
2020	"Dormir"	64	Todas Seremos Reinas
2021	"Báilalo mujer" (with Flor de Rap)	39	Mariposa
2021	"Demente" (featuring Lola Índigo)	23	Todas Seremos Reinas
2022	"Este Corazón" (with Moderatto)	–	Rockea bien duro

As featured artist

Year	Title	Chart	Album
2011	"Say Hey, Say Ohh" (featuring Neven)	100	MTV's Popland / Because You Lied
2014	"No Hace Daño» (featuring Bastian Herrera)	—	Al sur
2014	"Hayano Para Tu Muerte» (featuring JoseMaria Moure)	—	JoseMaria Moure
2014	"Tócate" (featuring Los Tetas)	93	Fundación Keep A Breast
2014	"Tanz» (featuring Los Tetas)	—	Non-album singles
2015	"Contigo» (featuring Juan Magan & Zaturno)	38	Non-album singles
2015	"Una Matriarca» (featuring Consuelo Schuster)	—	Matriarcas
2015	"Pon el Alma en el Juego» (featuring Luciano Pereyra, Cali & el Dandee, Sam Alvez & Dulce María)	—	Non-album singles
2016	"Aquí Estoy Yo» (featuring Nicolas Poblete)	66	Aladino, el musical
2018	"Secretario Intimidad» (featuring Cecilia Echeñique)	—	A dúo
2020	"El Bosque» (featuring Fuel Fandango)	—	Origen

Other charted songs

Year	Title	Chart	Album
2008	"Si Tú Me Quieres"	83	El Blog de la Feña
2008	"Déjate Llevar"	84	El Blog de la Feña

== Soundtracks ==
=== With El Blog de la Feña ===
List of albums and certifications
Title	Album details	Peak	Certifications
Title	Album details	CHL	Certifications
El Blog de la Feña	Released: August 14, 2008; Formats: CD, digital download; Label: Feria Music	4	CHL: Gold
El Blog de la Feña 2	Released: April 18, 2009; Formats: CD, digital download; Label: Feria Music	9	

=== With Amango ===
List of albums and certifications
Title	Album details	Peak	Certifications
Title	Album details	CHL	Certifications
Amango: El sueño se Hizo Realidad	Released: July 27, 2007; Label: Feria Music; Formats: CD, digital download	1	CHL: Platinum
Amango Villancicos	Released: November 23, 2007; Label: Feria Music; Formats: CD, digital download	10	
Esto No Es Un Juego	Released: Abril 18, 2008; Label: Feria Music; Formats: CD, digital download	1	CHL: Gold

=== With CRZ ===
List of albums and certifications
Title	Album details	Peak	Certifications
Title	Album details	CHL	Certifications
Corazón rebelde	Released: December 1, 2009; Formats: Feria Music; Label: CD, digital download	3	CHL: Gold
