= Rebeldes (album) =

Studio album by Rebeldes
- Released: September 30, 2011
- Recorded: 2011
- Genre: Pop; dance-pop; teen pop
- Length: 50:04
- Label: EMI; Record Entretenimento
- Producer: Rick Bonadio

Rebeldes chronology
Rebeldes (2011)	Rebeldes – Ao vivo (2012)

Singles from Rebeldes
- 1. "Do Jeito Que Eu Sou" Released: August 16, 2011; 2. "Depois da Chuva" Released: June 15, 2012

Rebeldes is the debut studio album by Brazilian pop group Rebeldes, originating from the Brazilian telenovela Rebel Rio. Released on September 23, 2011, by EMI and Record Entretenimento with recording and production of Rick Bonadio and composition of the own Bonadio, Di Ferrero, Cris Morena, Gee Rocha and Eric Silva, the work has fifteen tracks. The album reached 3rd place on the ABPD, receiving a gold record certification for over 40,000 copies sold and soon after the certification of the platinum record certification for reaching the mark of 80,000 copies. The Record Entretenimento confirmed in total, 120,000 copies sold of the disc. The album was number 12 in the best selling albums in Brazil in 2011.

Do Jeito Que Eu Sou was the first single to be officially released from the album, coming in 21st in the Billboard Brasil Hot 100 and 17th in Billboard Brasil Hot Pop, the song was released on August 16, 2011, and your music video was released in December of the same year. In June 2012, the band announced the release of the second and final single from the album Rebeldes called Depois da Chuva, the music video contains scenes from the first DVD of the band Rebeldes – Ao vivo.

== Track listing ==
No.	Title	Writer(s)	Length
1.	"Do Jeito Que Eu Sou"	Di Ferrero, Gee Rocha, Rick Bonadio	03:17
2.	"O Amor Está em Jogo"	Di Ferrero, Gee Rocha, Rick Bonadio	03:32
3.	"Quando Estou do Seu Lado"	Di Ferrero, Gee Rocha, Rick Bonadio	04:03
4.	"Livre pra Viver"	Di Ferrero, Gee Rocha, Rick Bonadio	03:23
5.	"Outra Frequência"	Di Ferrero, Gee Rocha, Rick Bonadio	03:21
6.	"Como um Rockstar"	Di Ferrero, Gee Rocha, Rick Bonadio	03:28
7.	"Rebelde para Sempre"	Di Ferrero, Gee Rocha, Rick Bonadio	03:10
8.	"Juntos Até o Fim"	Di Ferrero, Gee Rocha, Rick Bonadio	03:56
9.	"Tchau pra Você"	Di Ferrero, Gee Rocha, Rick Bonadio	03:16
10.	"Um Dia de Cada Vez"	Di Ferrero, Gee Rocha, Rick Bonadio	03:06
11.	"Depois da Chuva"	Di Ferrero, Gee Rocha, Rick Bonadio	03:48
12.	"Só Pro Meu Prazer"	Leoni, Fabiana Kherlakian	03:43
13.	"Ponto Fraco"	Di Ferrero, Gee Rocha, Rick Bonadio	03:41
14.	"Você É o Melhor Pra Mim"	Rick Bonadio, Eric Silver, Cris Morena	03:03

Bonus track
No.	Title	Writer(s)	Length
15.	"Do Jeito Que Eu Sou (acoustic version)"	Di Ferrero, Gee Rocha, Rick Bonadio	03:17
Total length:			50:04
