= Sophia Abrahão (album) =

Studio album by Sophia Abrahão
- Released: 16 October 2015
- Recorded: 2014–2015
- Genre: Pop
- Length: 33:35
- Label: FS Music
- Producer: Fernando Zor

Sophia Abrahão chronology
Sophia (2014)	Sophia Abrahão (2015)

Singles from Sophia Abrahão
- 1. "Náufrago" Released: 29 September 2015

Sophia Abrahão is the debut studio album by Brazilian singer Sophia Abrahão. It was released on 16 October 2015 by FS Music. "Náufrago" was released as the lead single from the album on September 29, 2015. The album contains 11 songs including a re-recording of "Resposta", song authored by rock band Skank. The album was produced by Fernando Zor.

== Promotion ==
=== Singles ===
- "Náufrago": Released on September 29, 2015 was the first song to be single from the album "Sophia Abrahão". In the music video, Sophia made romantic couple with the actor Murilo Armacollo.

=== Promotional singles ===
- "Nós Três": Released on November 13, 2015.
- "Bom Dia": Was released on November 17, 2015.

== Track listing ==
1. Se Vira (Bruno Caliman) – 3:26
2. Besteira (Lucas Santos, Rafael Torres) – 3:36
3. Náufrago (Lucas Santos, Rafael Torres, Bruno Villas) – 3:14
4. Pelúcia (Bruno Caliman, Maloka, Fernando Zor) – 2:31
5. Bom Dia (Bruno Caliman) – 3:17
6. Tipo Assim (Bruno Caliman) – 3:18
7. Resposta (Samuel Rosa, Nando Reis) – 2:55
8. Valeu Demais (Bruno Caliman) – 3:44
9. Ligar pra Quê? (Fernando Zor, Maloka) – 3:28
10. Nós Três (Bruno Caliman) – 3:08
11. Sinal Vermelho (Theo Fabbri, Fernando Zor) – 2:58

== Release history ==
Region	Date	Format	Label
Brazil	October 16, 2015	CD, digital download	FS Music
