= Rebelde (Brazilian TV series) =

Brazilian soap opera

- Genre: Soap opera
- Created by: Margareth Boury
- Based on: Rebelde Way by Cris Morena; Rebelde by Pedro Damián
- Written by: Margareth Boury; Rene Belmonte; Valéria Motta; Ana Clara Santiago; Gibran Dipp
- Story by: Cris Morena
- Directed by: Ivan Zettel; Léo Miranda; Rudi Lagemann; Patrícia Fallopa
- Starring: Sophia Abrahão; Micael Borges; Lua Blanco; Arthur Aguiar; Mel Fronckowiak; Chay Suede
- Opening theme: "Rebelde para Sempre" by RebeldeS
- Country of origin: Brazil
- Original language: Brazilian Portuguese
- No. of seasons: 2
- No. of episodes: 410

Production
- Production company: Televisa

Original release
- Network: Rede Record
- Release: March 21, 2011 – October 12, 2012

Related
- Rebelde Way (2002); Remix; Rebelde (2004-06); Rebelde Way (2008); Corazón rebelde Rebelde (2022)

Rebelde (English title: Rebel Rio!) is a Brazilian soap opera produced by Rede Record. Written by Margareth Boury, the show is inspired by the original work created by Cris Morena. It is a remake of the Mexican soap opera Rebelde.

The main cast is composed of Lua Blanco, Arthur Aguiar, Melanie Fronckowiak, Chay Suede, Sophia Abrahão and Micael Borges - six students in a school called "Elite Way" that form not only a close friendship, but a band.

== Synopsis ==
The Elite Way is one of the most renowned educational institutions in the country, where students have access to high-level education, practice elite sports and live in semi-boarding school. They live at the school from Monday to Friday and on weekends they return home. Despite the rather rigid scheme, the richer families of Rio de Janeiro make sure their children study at the Elite Way. This is the case of Alice, Roberta, Diego, Carla and Tomás, rebellious and impulsive teenagers, who will discover a common goal in music.

The idealist Pedro will join them, a fellow student like many others in the college, who will snatch hearts and change much in the daily life of the school. The coexistence of privileged children and scholarship recipients is precisely the trigger for much of the conflict between students.

Pedro just does not realize that when he gets to the Elite Way, he's going to fall madly in love with Alice, and she will be totally engrossed by him in turn. Their romance will have to overcome many obstacles, such as the secrets that surround their families and the envy of the pampered daughter of the director of the school, Pilar, who also falls in love with Pedro. In his early days in the new school, Pedro meets Roberta, Diego, Carla and Tomás. They do not immediately accept him, but in time they will become his best friends. The romances, conflicts, confusions, joys and adventures are not limited to what happens behind the walls of the college. When they go home on weekends, a lot happens.

Alice wants her father, Franco, to fall in love again. Roberta does not get along with her mother, Eva, a famous singer who has always treated her as a younger sister. Diego would like his father, the powerful businessman Leonardo Maldonado, to pay more attention to him and so he will prepare the biggest confusions to attract attention. Heir to an immense fortune, Tomás finds himself with his relatives, his grandmother and two cousins, who only think about toasting all their money. And Carla, who dreams of being a dancer, is always around with her model sister, Becky, and out of anxiety, ends up eating more than she should.

Pedro returns to his new home in Rio de Janeiro, a modest house in the suburb, where he lives with his mother Beth and his brother Raul. It is in this same district, the Vila Lene. There lives other characters: the maternal Teresa, owner of the school canteen; And the fun Genaro, a widower who runs with his daughter Cilene a lively restaurant that will be the band's first stage. There also lives the family of the teacher Lupi, a computer genius who has enriched the Internet; and the teacher Vicente, who transformed an old factory into a modern youth republic.

Since losing his father when he was 13, Pedro lives for his mother and his brother. But now that he has moved to Rio, he is eager for change and news, wanting to live the fullness of his youth and rebellion, falling in love, singing, having fun and also unraveling a mystery: the motives of his father's death, which involve just the father of the girl he loves – Alice.

Despite the adversities and everything that separates them, Alice, Pedro, Roberta, Diego, Carla and Tomás will be united by the passion for music and the dream of living now as if there were no tomorrow. With much rebelliousness, they will revolutionize their lives and that of many people in their path.

== Soundtrack ==
Rebelde

Soundtrack album by Various Artists
- Released: 2012
- Genre: Soundtrack; Pop; dance-pop; teen pop; pop rock
- Language: Portuguese
- Label: EMI Music
- Producer: Rick Binadio

Rebelde is the soundtrack of the Brazilian the same name, released in 2012 by EMI. It was inspired by the Mexican telenovela of the same name Rebelde (2004-2006), produced by Pedro Damián. In addition to the composer track for the actors of the novel, a parallel soundtrack was shown until the band Rebeldes was formed, with important names like Adriana Calcanhotto singing the theme of Roberta and Diego (Lua Blanco and Arthur Aguiar), Diego Moraes singing the theme of Vila Leme, and Luiza Possi, singing the theme of Eva Messi. Also participating are singers of the casting of Rede Record, such as Hellen Lyu singing the theme of Pilar, and Octávio Cardozzo singing the theme of Jonas. The band Rebeldes already had its own portal. In the plot, the creator of the site is the character Téo, and the logo of the band was designed by Alice, interpreted by Bernardo Falcone and Sophia Abrahão, respectively.

== Cast ==
=== Main cast ===
Main cast of Rebelde
Actor	Character	Season	
Actor	Character	1	2
Sophia Abrahão	Alice Albuquerque	Main	Main
Lua Blanco	Roberta Messi	Main	Main
Micael Borges	Pedro Costa	Main	Main
Arthur Aguiar	Diego Maldonado	Main	Main
Mel Fronckowiak	Carla Ferrer	Main	Main
Chay Suede	Tomás Campos Sales Penedo	Main	Main
Adriana Garambone	Eva Messi	Main	Main
Luciano Szafir	Franco Albuquerque	Main	Main
Eliana Guttman	Ofélia Campos Sales	Main	Main
Floriano Peixoto	Jonas Araripe	Main	Main
Juan Alba	Leonardo Maldonado	Main	Main
Eduardo Pires	Vicente Campos	Main	Main
Zezé Motta	Divina "Dadá" Alves	Main	Guest
Cássia Linhares	Silvia Torres	Main	Main
Lana Rhodes	Bernarda "Becky" Pires	Main	Main
Cláudia Lira	Elizabeth "Beth" Costa	Main	Main
Daniel Erthal	Artur Paz	Main	Main
Rayana Carvalho	Pilar Araripe	Main	Main
Carla Diaz	Márcia Luz	Main	Main
Juliana Xavier	Beatriz "Bia" Alves	Main	Main
Michel Gomes	João Alves	Main	Main
Antônio Pompêo	Alceu Alves	Main	Guest
Adriana Londoño	Leila Campos Sales	Main	Main
Bernardo Falcone	Téo Marques	Main	Main
Sylvio Meanda	"Pingo"	Main	Main
Pérola Faria	Vitória Paz	Main	Main
Augusto Garcia	Marcelo	Main	Main
Karen Marinho	Cilene Zanetti	Main	Main
Lucas Cotrim	Raul Costa	Main	Main
Veronica Debom	Cristina "Cris" Carvalho	Main	Main
Marina Rigueira	Tatiana Torres		Main
Rafaela Ferreira	Penélope		Main
Ully Lages	Lucy Zimer		Main
Thiago Amaral	Miguel Zimer		Main
Pedro Cassiano	Fábio "Binho" Soares de Castro	Main	Main
Lisandra Parede	Débora Torres	Main	Guest
Antonio Jorge	Vinícius		Main
Diego Montez	Murilo		Main
Jhulie Campello	Maria	Recurring	Main
Juliana Rolim	Juliana "Juju"	Recurring	Main
Rodrigo Dorado	Bernardo "Bê"		Main

=== Recurring cast ===
Actor	Character	Season	
Actor	Character	1	2
João Victor Granja	"Arturzinho"		Recurring
Alessandra Loyola	Daniela "Dani"	Recurring	Recurring
Anita Amizo	Bruna	Recurring	
Marcos Ferian	Guto	Recurring	Recurring
Mariana Cysne	Maria Eduarda "Duda"	Recurring	Recurring
Rodolpho Bellos	Marco	Recurring	

== The music group Rebeldes ==
Parallel to the fictional band created the rebels with the protagonists of the series: Lua Blanco (Roberta), Sophia Abrahão (Alice), Mel Fronckowiak (Carla), Arthur Aguiar (Diego), Chay Suede (Tomás) and Micael Borges (Pedro). They interpreted the main themes of fiction that were heard during the episodes.

The band had great success thanks to the good ratings of the series in Brazil, where it was displayed.

== Awards and nominations ==
Year	Award	Category	Nomination	Result
2011	Prêmio Jovem Brasileiro	Melhor Série Jovem	Margareth Boury	Won
2011	Meus Prêmios Nick	Programa de TV Favorito	Margareth Boury	Won
2011	Meus Prêmios Nick	Atriz Favorita	Sophia Abrahão	Won
2011	Troféu Raça Negra	Melhor Ator	Micael Borges	Won
2011	Troféu Raça Negra	Melhor Ator	Antônio Pompêo	Nominated
2011	Troféu Raça Negra	Melhor Ator	Rocco Pitanga	Nominated
2011	Troféu Raça Negra	Melhor Ator	Michel Gomes	Nominated
2011	Troféu Raça Negra	Melhor Atriz	Juliana Xavier	Nominated
2011	Troféu Raça Negra	Melhor Atriz	Zezé Motta	Nominated
2011	Capricho Awards	Melhor Beijo da Ficção	Diego and Roberta	Won
2011	Capricho Awards	Melhor Ator Nacional	Arthur Aguiar	Won
2011	Capricho Awards	Melhor Ator Nacional	Chay Suede	Nominated
2011	Capricho Awards	Melhor Atriz Nacional	Sophia Abrahão	Nominated
2011	Capricho Awards	Melhor Atriz Nacional	Lua Blanco	Won
2011	Capricho Awards	Melhor Programa de TV	Margareth Boury	Won
2011	Prêmio Extra de Televisão	Ator Revelação	Chay Suede	Won
2011	Prêmio Extra de Televisão	Atriz Revelação	Lua Blanco	Nominated
2011	Prêmio Extra de Televisão	Melhor Novela	Margareth Boury	Nominated
2011	Prêmio Extra de Televisão	Melhor Tema Musical	Rebelde Para Sempre, by Rebeldes	Nominated
2011	Prêmio Extra de Televisão	Melhor Figurino	Margareth Boury	Nominated
2011	UOL PopTevê	Melhor Telenovela	Margareth Boury	Won
2011	UOL PopTevê	Ator Revelação	Arthur Aguiar	Won
2011	UOL PopTevê	Ator Revelação	Chay Suede	Nominated
2011	UOL PopTevê	Atriz Revelação	Lua Blanco	Won
2011	UOL PopTevê	Atriz Revelação	Mel Fronckowiak	Won
2012	Prêmio Arte Qualidade Brasil	Melhor Telenovela	Margareth Boury	Nominated
2012	Prêmio Arte Qualidade Brasil	Melhor Ator Revelação	Chay Suede	Won
2012	Prêmio Arte Qualidade Brasil	Melhor Atriz Revelação	Lua Blanco	Nominated
2012	Prêmio Arte Qualidade Brasil	Melhor Direção	Ivan Zettel	Nominated
2012	Troféu Imprensa	Melhor Novela	Margareth Boury	Nominated
2012	Troféu Imprensa	Melhor Ator	Chay Suede	Nominated
2012	Troféu Imprensa	Revelação do Ano	Mel Fronckowiak	Nominated
2012	Troféu Internet	Melhor Novela	Margareth Boury	Won
2012	Troféu Internet	Revelação do Ano	Mel Fronckowiak	Won
2012	Troféu Internet	Melhor Atriz	Mel Fronckowiak	Won
2012	Troféu Internet	Melhor Ator	Chay Suede	Won
2012	Prêmio Contigo! de TV	Melhor Novela	Margareth Boury	Nominated
2012	Prêmio Contigo! de TV	Melhor Atriz de Novela	Sophia Abrahão	Nominated
2012	Prêmio Contigo! de TV	Melhor Ator de Novela	Micael Borges	Nominated
2012	Prêmio Contigo! de TV	Melhor Ator Coadjuvante	Floriano Peixoto	Nominated
2012	Prêmio Contigo! de TV	Melhor Atriz Coadjuvante	Adriana Garambone	Nominated
2012	Prêmio Contigo! de TV	Revelação da TV	Chay Suede	Nominated
2012	Prêmio Contigo! de TV	Revelação da TV	Lua Blanco	Nominated
2012	Prêmio Contigo! de TV	Melhor Autor de Novela	Margareth Boury	Nominated
2012	Prêmio Contigo! de TV	Melhor Diretor de Novela	Ivan Zettel	Nominated
2012	Prêmio Jovem Brasileiro	Melhor Série da TV	Margareth Boury	Won
2012	Meus Prêmios Nick	Programa de TV Favorito	Margareth Boury	Nominated
2012	Meus Prêmios Nick	Atriz Favorita	Lua Blanco	Nominated
2012	Meus Prêmios Nick	Personagem de TV Favorito	Alice Albuquerque	Nominated
2012	Prêmio Extra de Televisão	Ídolo Teen	Lua Blanco	Nominated
2012	Prêmio Extra de Televisão	Ídolo Teen	Arthur Aguiar	Nominated
2012	Capricho Awards	Melhor Ator Nacional	Micael Borges	Won
2012	Capricho Awards	Melhor Beijo da Ficção	Diego and Roberta	Won
2012	Capricho Awards	Melhor Atriz Nacional	Sophia Abrahão	Won

== International release ==
Country	Network(s)	Local title
Brazil	RecordTV	Rebelde
Mozambique	TV Miramar; Zap Novelas	Rebelde
Cape Verde	RecordTV Cabo Verde	Rebelde
Angola	Zap Novelas; TPA 2	Rebelde
Japan	RecordTV Japão	Rebelde
Europe	RecordTV Europa	Rebelde
Italy	La5	Rebelde
