= Rebeldes =

Brazilian pop-rock group

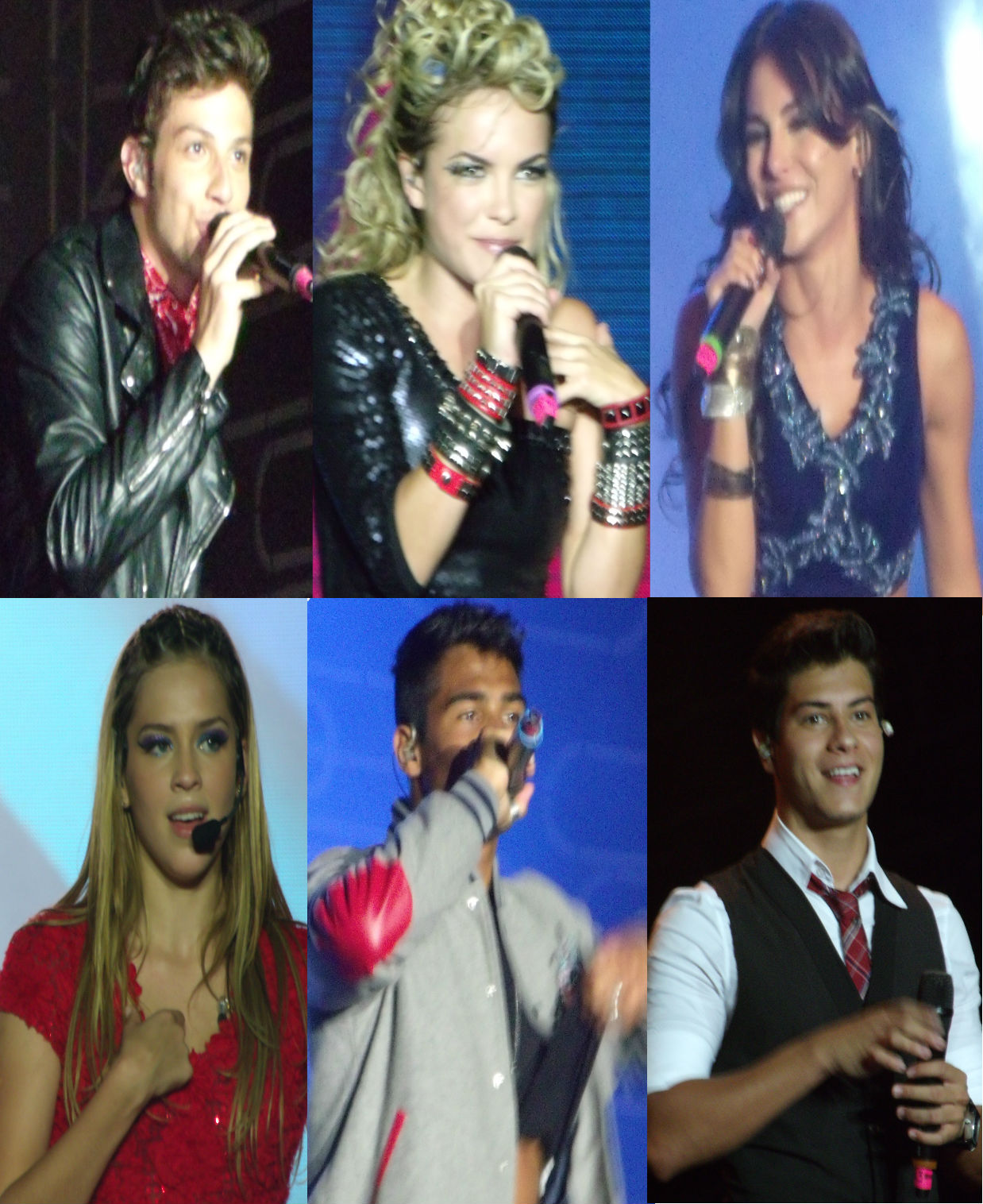
- Top, from left: Chay Suede, Lua Blanco, Melanie Fronckowiak; Bottom, from left: Sophia Abrahão, Micael Borges, Arthur Aguiar

Background information
- Also known as: RebeldeS; RBR
- Origin: Rio de Janeiro, Brazil
- Genres: Pop; dance-pop; teen pop
- Years active: 2011–2013
- Labels: EMI Music; Record Entretenimento
- Past members: Arthur Aguiar; Chay Suede; Lua Blanco; Melanie Fronckowiak; Micael Borges; Sophia Abrahão

Rebeldes (also stylized as RebeldeS) was a Brazilian musical group that emerged from the Brazilian soap opera Rebel Rio, produced by Rede Record in partnership with Mexican Televisa. In the plot, the six main characters—Alice, Carla, Diego, Pedro, Roberta, and Tomás—form a fictitious band, and the six actors who play these characters—Sophia Abrahão, Melanie Fronckowiak, Arthur Aguiar, Micael Borges, Lua Blanco, and Chay Suede, respectively—started to act like a real band.

Rebeldes released their self-titled debut album on 30 September 2011 on EMI Music in partnership with Record Entertainment, and it reached third place in Brazil's official music chart, the CD – TOP 20 Weekly ABPD, for two consecutive weeks, with the initial single disc, Do Jeito Que Eu Sou, reaching seventeenth and twenty-first chart positions on the Hot 100 and Hot Pop, the Billboard Brazil, respectively. On 11 April 2012, the sextet released their first live album and DVD, entitled Rebeldes - Ao vivo, recorded during shows in São Paulo to 7,000 people. In the same month as the telenovela, which last aired in October 2012, the band announced their breakup, closing with a last tour, Rebeldes Para Sempre.

== Career ==
=== 2010–2011: Formation and debut album ===
Singer Chay Suede participated in the fifth season of the Brazilian reality show Ídolos and, shortly after being eliminated in September 2010, was already being considered as a new cast member of Rebel Rio, due to its popularity with the public. At the end of October, the actors who would comprise the band were announced.

The Brazilian band NX Zero took part in producing the debut Rebeldes album. The opening song, recorded by the six protagonists on 14 March 2011, was composed by Di Ferrero, lead singer of the band, guitarist Gee Rocha, and producer Rick Bonadio. The team participated in writing the rest of the album, which we released on 23 September 2011. "Do Jeito Que Eu Sou" came out as the first single, and was accompanied by an acoustic version, originally included on Rebeldes as a bonus track. On 6 November 2011, on the stage of Programa do Gugu, Rebeldes won their first gold record, for selling 50,000 copies of the record. This was certified by the Brazilian Association of Record Producers (ABPD). The band members said they dreamed of playing to national audiences. The tour, titled Rebeldes Teen Festival, began in Porto Alegre in October 2011, with a show that included the participation of pop singer Manu Gavassi. The album went on to be certified Platinum.

=== 2012: Live record and second album ===
On 11 March 2012, Rebeldes released their first live CD and DVD, titled Rebeldes – Ao vivo. The album reached 5th position in the Top 10, thus garnering the group their second Gold record for 60,000 copies sold, while the DVD was certified Platinum 80,000 copies sold. On 7 April, the band released the promo single "Nada Pode Nos Parar" to publicize the album and DVD. In June, the song "Depois da Chuva" was released as the third official single from the album Rebeldes, with a live clip taken from the band's first DVD.

In September 2012, Rebeldes issued the first single from their second album, "Liberdade Consciente", a reggaeton tune. This was followed in the same month by another single, "Meu Jeito, Seu Jeito", sung by Lua Blanco. The name of the band's second album was also Meu Jeito, Seu Jeito.

=== 2013: The end ===
In March 2013, after much controversy and rumors, Arthur Aguiar used his Instagram account to confirm the group's breakup. He promised they would still perform the shows which had already been scheduled.

Lua Blanco died on 18 October 2026, aged 39, following a battle with colorectal cancer.

== Past members ==
- Chay Suede
- Lua Blanco
- Melanie Fronckowiak
- Sophia Abrahão
- Micael Borges
- Arthur Aguiar

== Discography ==
Studio albums

- Rebeldes (2011)
- Meu Jeito, Seu Jeito (2012)

Live albums

- Rebeldes – Ao vivo (2012)

== Tours ==
Year	Tour
2011–2012	Tour Rebeldes (Rebeldes Teen Festival)
2012	Tour Nada Pode Nos Parar (NPNP)
2012	Tour Asepxia Rebeldes
2012–2013	Tour Rebeldes Para Sempre

== Awards and nominations ==
Year	Award	Category	Notes	Result
2011	Prêmio Extra de TV	Best Theme Song	"Rebelde Para Sempre"	Nominated
2011	Capricho Awards	National Band	Rebeldes	Won
2012	Troféu Imprensa	Best Musical Set	Rebeldes	Nominated
2012	Troféu Internet	Best Musical Set	Rebeldes	Won
2012	Prêmio Jovem Brasileiro	Best Band	Rebeldes	Won
2012	Prêmio Jovem Brasileiro	Best Young Singer	Mel Fronckowiak	Won
2012	Prêmio Jovem Brasileiro	Best Young Singer	Chay Suede	Won
2012	Meus Prêmios Nick	Musical Revelation	Rebeldes	Nominated
2012	Capricho Awards	National Band	Rebeldes	Won
