= Catalina González =

Chilean artist

Catalina González is a Chilean artist.

== Education ==
González has a Bachelors of Fine Arts from University ARCIS, as well as a Diploma Aesthetic Contemporary Thought from Universidad Diego Portales and a Diploma Developing, Territory Poorness from Alberto Hurtado University.

== Exhibitions ==
=== Desarraigos (Solo) ===
The exhibition Desarraigos came to life on June 3, 2017. This exhibition consists of components such as algae, photography and video. It exposes distinct elements that intertwine with the Tarapaca region.

== Postrauma (Group) ==
In this exhibition, each part shows trauma and the multiple expressions that come with it. Gonzalez does this exhibition alongside Jorge Brantmayer, Victor Castillo, Angie Saiz and Mexican artist Joaquin Segura. This exhibition was made to reflect that, aside from all the hidden fear and other social symptoms, a way of being able to maintain a livable life is developed.

== Artworks ==
- El Paisaje Que Nos Une – This piece was on a desert and had a map of the country of Bolivia and its popular cities, which encompass the "paisaje," which is the journey that connects everyone as a whole.
- Duna – This piece represents Earth, with its most prominent component being soil. It consists of images and a visual art of soil piled up with a bucket of rocks, which water flows into to represent the growth that is needed. This piece is also a collective and has been exhibited in the Patricia Ready Gallery.
- AIAV, exhibition residence program – This piece was made in Japan, and it encompasses the forest of Japan, containing images of the trees as well as video representations.

== Collections ==
- Sala Gaco 2018, Santiago de Chile
- Patricia Ready Gallery, 2017
- Atacama Desert, Alto Hospicio, 2016-2018
- Centro Cultural Estación Mapocho 2017
- Akiyoshidai International Art Village, Akiyoshidai – Japan

== Honors and awards ==
2017 – Cultural Grant 2017 (Arts Council, CL) Regional Circulation, Tarapacá, Chile.

2017 – Second prize CCU grant, Santiago. Chile.

2016 – Cultural Grant 2017(Arts Council, CL) FONDART National, Santiago de Chile

2016 – Cultural Grant 2017 (Arts Council, CL) FONDART Regional, Tarapacá, Chile.

2015 – First Prize Cha.co & Finland. Santiago, Chile.

2010/11 – Grant, Corporación Cultural Arte +, Santiago de Chile

2008/10 – Nominate for application to CIFO grant, Miami USA.

2010 – Prize 100 Lideres, El Mercurio Newspaper. Santiago de Chile

2007 – Bicentenary Prize MAVI, Museum of Visual Arts. Santiago de Chile.

– First Prize in Digital Art, Centro Cultural Matucana 100, Santiago de Chile.

– Honorable mention "From naturals to artificially" Chile University. Santiago de Chile.

2006 – Honorable mention, Nanometrajes Urbanos by Plagio magazine, Santiago de Chile.

== Publications ==
- Catalog CONTINUUM
- Catalago Del Otro Lado
- Book – Imagen Criolla
- Book – Paisajes Tarapequeños
- Catálago Intervenciones
- Catálago Umbra
- Book – Mes de Fotografia
- Catálago Venecia Italia

== Bibliography ==
- Arteinformado. "Catalina González. Artista." ARTEINFORMADO, ARTEINFORMADO, 26 Aug. 2015, www.arteinformado.com/guia/f/catalina-gonzalez-46784.
- Atlas. "Desarraigos De Catalina González En El CCEM." Revista ATLAS, 7 Apr. 2018, atlasiv.com/2017/06/03/desarraigos-catalina-gonzalez-ccem/.
- González, Catalina. CV. Catalina González, 1979.
- Coltura, El Mostrador. "Exposición Colectiva 'Postrauma' En Sala Gasco." El Mostrador, 10 Dec. 2018, www.elmostrador.cl/cultura/2018/12/10/exposicion-colectiva-postrauma-en-sala-gasco
- "Cata González." Cata González | Galería Patricia Ready, galeriapready.cl/artistas/cata-gonzalez/?lang=en.
