= Mel Fronckowiak =

Brazilian actress (born 1988)

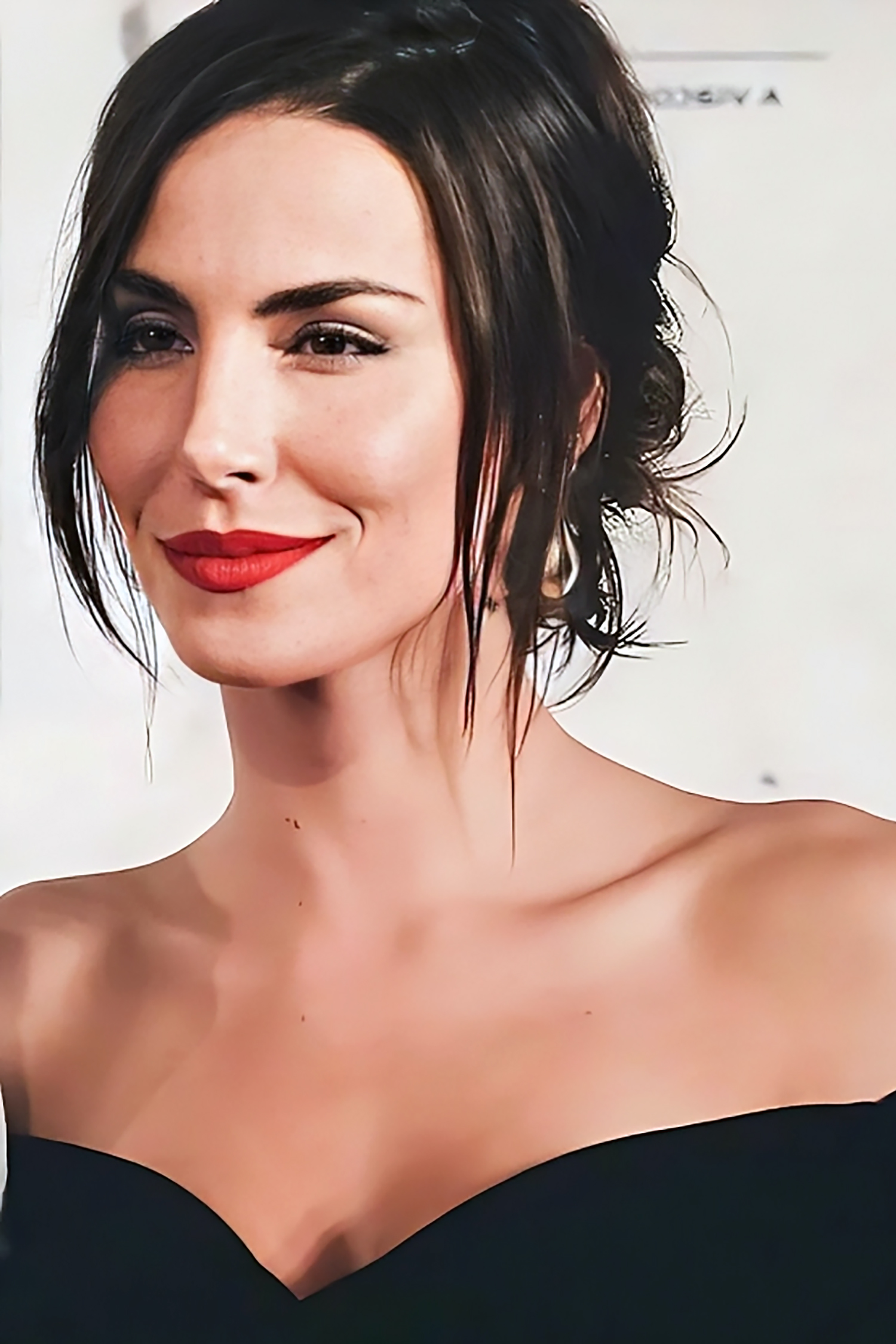
- Fronckowiak in 2019
- Born: Melanie Nunes Fronckowiak; 16 January 1988 (age 38); Araranguá, Santa Catarina, Brazil
- Occupations: Actress; writer; television host
- Spouse: Rodrigo Santoro (m. 2016)
- Children: 1

Melanie Nunes Fronckowiak (Brazilian Portuguese: [ˈmɛw fɾõkoviaˈki]; Polish: [frɔnt͡sˈkɔvjak]; born 16 January 1988) is a Brazilian actress, writer, and TV host. Fronckowiak became known after starring in several advertising and TV commercials while working as a model in São Paulo, at the Ford Models agency, which led her to participate in the Brazilian teen telenovela Rebelde, playing the character of Carla. In 2013, Fronckowiak launched herself as a writer. In her first book, Inclassificável: Memórias da Estrada, she tells the experiences she lived traveling around forty Brazilian cities with the band Rebeldes.

== Early life ==
The daughter of psychologist Berenice Nunes and André Fronckowiak, Melanie was born in Araranguá, in the state of Santa Catarina and raised in Pelotas, Rio Grande do Sul. In school, she acted in the play Grêmio estudantil and was several times representative of her class. In high school, she won a scholarship to a university in Santa Cruz do Sul, where her paternal uncle lived.

At the age of nineteen, Fronckowiak became a model after winning the title of Miss World Rio Grande do Sul, also winning Miss Personality and Miss Sul World.

== Career ==
After working as a model, Fronckowiak did amateur theater and began her television career by appearing in commercials. In 2010, she made a cameo appearance in a scene in the Brazilian soap opera Viver a Vida. In 2010, she signed with Rede Record, and the following year she joined the cast of Rebelde, where she played the character of Carla. On the show, Carla is a member of the pop band Rebeldes. The group went on to hold performances outside the program, with Fronckowiak as one of its six members.

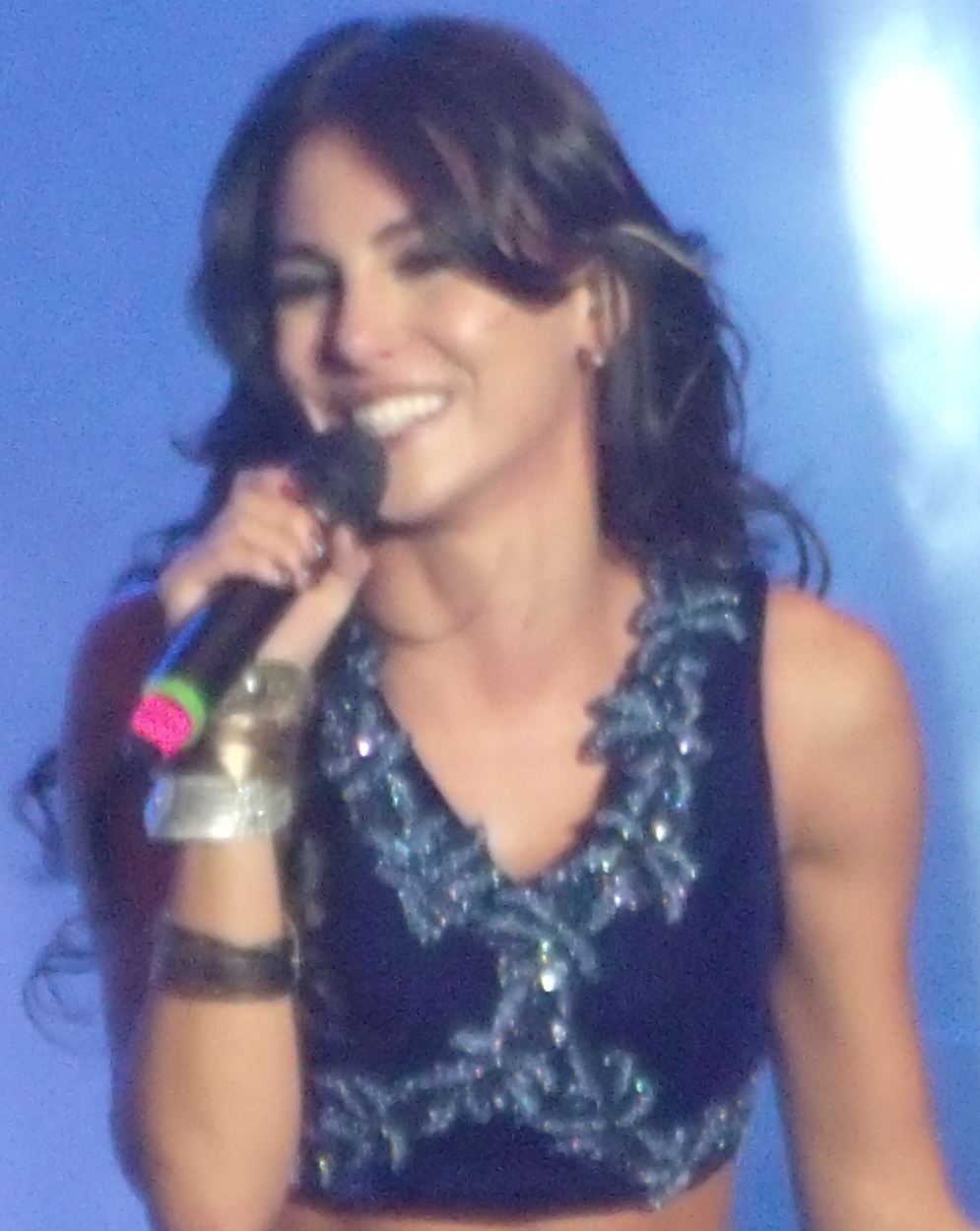
Fronckowiak in 2012

In October 2011, the former model was voted Girl of the Year in Meus Prêmios Nick, a teen event sponsored by Nickelodeon Brazil. In 2012, she won two categories in the Troféu Internet, and was nominated to Troféu Imprensa, one of the biggest annual awards on Brazilian television.

In May 2013, Fronckowiak published the book Inclassíficavel: Memórias da Estrada (Unclassifiable: Memories of the Road). According to her, a major publisher turned down the manuscript for "being difficult to classify". This experience influenced the naming of the book. The book includes poetic reflections and a collection of short stories that recorded during the Rebeldes tour of forty cities throughout Brazil.

Since 2014, Fronckowiak has worked as a television presenter. She signed with Rede Bandeirantes to work on the show A Liga. In February 2015, she was hired by Globosat to present Destino Certo, which premiered on 3 September 2015. This was her first solo program, and it was renewed for a second year.

In 2015, Fronckowiak was invited to join the cast of El Hipnotizador, the first bilingual HBO television series in Brazil. It was broadcast simultaneously in all Latin American countries by HBO Brasil and HBO Latin America Group, and also on Hispanic channels in the United States. That same year, Fronckowiak launched a fashion blog called Sweet Ray of Style and received the support of major brands, such as Chanel.

In 2016, Netflix announced Fronckowiak as part of the main cast of 3%, the first Brazilian original series on the streaming service.

== Selected filmography ==
List of appearances, with year, title, and role shown
Year	Program	Type	Role	Note	Ref
2010	Viver a Vida	Soap opera	Duda	Special appearance	
2011–2012	Rebelde	Soap opera	Carla Ferrer	Main character	
2012	Rebeldes Para Sempre	TV documentary	Herself		
2014–2016	A Liga	Documentary series	Herself	Presenter / reporter	
2015	El Hipnotizador	TV series	Daria	2 episodes	
2015–2019	Destino Certo	TV series	Herself	Presenter	
2016–2018	3%	Streaming series	Julia	3 episodes	
2018–2019	Troca de Estilo	TV series	Herself	Presenter	
2019	Show dos Famosos	Reality show	Herself	Participant	
2023	Mel Na Estrada	Web series	Herself	Presenter	

== Awards and nominations ==
Year	Award	Category	Work	Result
2012	Troféu Internet	Best Actress	Carla Ferrer in Rebelde	Won
2012	Troféu Internet	Revelation of the Year	Carla Ferrer in Rebelde	Won
2012	Troféu Imprensa	Revelation of the Year	Carla Ferrer in Rebelde	Nominated
2012	Prêmio Jovem Brasileiro	Best TV Actress	Carla Ferrer in Rebelde	Won
2012	Prêmio Jovem Brasileiro	Best Female Singer	Rebeldes	Won
2014	Prêmio Jovem Brasileiro	Best TV Presenter	A Liga	Won
2014	Prêmio Jovem Brasileiro	Best Writer	Inclassificável: Memórias da Estrada	Won
2015	Prêmio Jovem Brasileiro	Best TV Reporter	A Liga	Won
2015	Troféu Internet	Best TV Presenter	Destino Certo	Nominated
