= Sophia Abrahão =

Brazilian actress and singer (born 1991)

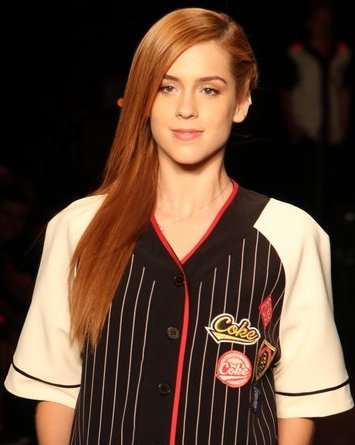
- Abrahão in 2014

Background information
- Born: Sophia Sampaio Abrahão; May 22, 1991 (age 35); São Paulo, Brazil
- Genre: Pop
- Occupations: Singer, actress, songwriter, model, blogger, dancer, writer
- Instruments: Vocals, Acoustic guitar
- Years active: 2007–present (actress); 2011–present (singer)
- Labels: Sony Music (2013–2015); FS Music (2015–present)
- Formerly of: Rebeldes
- Website: sophiaabrahao.com.br

Sophia Sampaio Abrahão (born May 22, 1991) is a Brazilian actress and singer.

Abrahão starred in her first telenovela in 2007, when she played the preppy Felipa on the 15th season of Malhação. In 2011, she played the preppy Alice Albuquerque on the telenovela Rebelde, which led to the band Rebeldes, which participated along with the other five protagonists of the telenovela.

In 2013, Abrahão was invited to play Tina in the film Confissões de Adolescente, repeating the role she had done in the play in 2010. She then played Natasha on the telenovela Amor à Vida, where she dyed her hair to play a redhead for the characterization of the character of the sister of Nicole (Marina Ruy Barbosa). In 2014, Sophia played Gaby in the telenovela Alto Astral.

In February 2015, Abrahão became one of four digital spokespeople for L'Oreal Paris Brazil. In October of the same year, she released her self-titled album Sophia Abrahão.

== Career ==
Sophia Abrahão began modeling at 14 years-of-age. When she was 15 years old, she lived alone in China for four months. Later, she traveled to countries like Japan, Singapore and Hong Kong, where she worked making catalogs and fashion shows. She converted to Buddhism. When she returned to Brazil, she continued her modeling career and in parallel, joined a theater course, when the test for the telenovela Malhação emerged. Sophia was approved for the 2007 season, in which she played the preppy Felipa.

In 2010, the actress participated in the television series Bicicleta e Melancia via Multishow. In the theater, she participated in Confissões de Adolescente, also during that year. A few months later, she signed a contract with Rede Record to be one of the protagonists of the teen telenovela Rebelde, playing the preppy Alice Albuquerque. Alice is one of the six vocalists of the band Rebeldes, which has performed in cities throughout Brazil.

In 2012, after the end of Rebelde, Abrahão launched her personal blog, which features fashion productions, beauty tips, and updates. Already preparing to follow up with her solo career in music, Abrahão did some songs with her cousin Brian Cohen and released two video clips between 2012 and 2013 which are entitled "Sem Você" and "Não Quero Mais". She also continued doing shows for the farewell tour of Rebeldes which had its last show on May 4, 2013, in the capital of Minas Gerais, Belo Horizonte. Afterward, Abrahão was selected to be one of the protagonists of the film Confissões de Adolescente, reprising the character "Tina".

In 2013 she dyed her hair red to play the role of Natasha, the sister of Nicole (Marina Ruy Barbosa) in the telenovela Amor à Vida. She did part of the plan of Lídia (Angela Rebello) and Rogério (Daniel Rocha), which began to be put in place after the girl back to the doctor in the United States, to get back at Leila (Fernanda Machado) and Thales (Ricardo Tozzi) for what they did to her sister.

In 2014 she played the righteous Gaby in the telenovela Alto Astral. After the end of the telenovela, Sophia Abrahão was cast in the feature-length film Se a Vida Começasse Agora, directed by Alexandre Klemperer.

=== 2015-present: First studio album ===
In October 2015 she released her first studio album, self-titled "Sophia Abrahão". The album contains compositions of Fernando Zor (who also produced the album) and even a cover of the song "Resposta" (by rock band Skank). Abrahão launched in September 2015 the song "Náufrago," the lead single from the album "Sophia Abrahão". They were already plans to shoot the music video for "Pelúcia," due to be released in April 2016.

== Filmography ==
=== Soap operas ===
Year	Title	Role
2007–2009	Malhação	Felipa Gentil
2011-2012	Rebelde	Alice Albuquerque
2013-2014	Amor à Vida	Natasha Veiga de Assis Brito
2014-2015	Alto Astral	Gabriela "Gaby" Santana Peixoto
2016	A Lei do Amor	Young Vitória Costa Leitão
2019	Malhação: Toda Forma de Amar	Herself
2020–21	Salve-se Quem Puder	Herself / Júlia Santamarina

=== TV Series ===
Year	Title	Role
2010	Bicicleta e Melancia	Gabriela "Gabi"
2021	As Five	Dani Junqueira
2022	Amores que engañan	Amanda Rocha
2024	Benefits with Friends	Giselle Lopes

=== Films ===
Year	Title	Role
2014	Confissões de Adolescente	Cristina "Tina"
2015	Anjo de Cabelos Longos	Luiza
2019	Cine Holliúdy 2: A Chibata Sideral	The Alien
2020	Amarillas	
2021	Ron's Gone Wrong	Miss Thomas (brazilian voice)
2023	Letícia	Letícia
TBA	Todo Mundo Ainda Tem Problemas Sexuais	Daniela

=== TV Shows ===
Year	Title	Function
2016	Dança dos Famosos	Participant (2nd place)
2017–19	Vídeo Show	Presenter / Reporter
2017	The Voice Extras	Presenter
2021	Super Dança dos Famosos	Participant (6th place)

=== Internet ===
Year	Title	Role
2013–15	Fica a Dica	Presenter
2014	Um Sonho em Veneza	Presenter
2015	O Reino das Vozes que Não se Calam	Presenter
2020	PodChegar: Em Casa	Presenter

== Stage ==
Year	Title	Role
2010	Confissões de Adolescente	—
2013	Tudo por um Popstar	Herself

== Discography ==
- Sophia Abrahão (2015)

== Literature ==
Year	Book	Function	Publishing Company
2014	O Reino das Vozes que Não se Calam	Co-author (With Carolina Munhóz)	Fantástica Rocco
2015	O Mundo das Vozes Silenciadas	Co-author (With Carolina Munhóz)	Fantástica Rocco
2015	O Reino Secreto: Livro de Colorir	Co-author (With Carolina Munhóz)	Fantástica Rocco

== Concert tours ==
- Tudo que Eu Sempre Quis Tour (2016)

== Awards and nominations ==
=== Actress ===
- 2011: Melhor Atriz at the Meus Prêmios Nick, for Rebelde (won)
- 2011: Melhor Atriz Nacional at the Capricho Awards, for Rebelde (nominated)
- 2012: Melhor Atriz de Novela at the Prêmio Contigo! de TV, for Rebelde (nominated)
- 2012: Personagem de TV Favorito at the Meus Prêmios Nick, for Rebelde (nominated)
- 2012: Melhor Atriz Nacional at the Capricho Awards, for Rebelde (won)
- 2014: Actress at the Shorty Awards, for Amor à Vida (nominated)
- 2014: Atriz Favorita at the Revista Atrevida, for Alto Astral (nominated)
- 2015: Melhor Atriz de 2014 at the Troféu Internet, for Alto Astral (nominated)
- 2015: Melhor Atriz Jovem at the Prêmio Jovem Brasileiro, for Alto Astral (nominated)

=== Singer ===
- 2014: Experimente at the Prêmio Multishow de Música Brasileira (nominated)
- 2014: Cantora Favorita at the Meus Prêmios Nick (nominated)
- 2014: Melhor Cantora Jovem at the Prêmio Jovem Brasileiro (won)
- 2015: Melhor Cantora Jovem at the Prêmio Jovem Brasileiro (nominated)
- 2015: Cantora Nacional at the Capricho Awards (nominated)
- 2015: Cantora Nacional do Ano at the Prêmio Top TodaTeen (nominated)
- 2015: Cantora Nacional at the Geração Z Awards (won)
- 2016: Melhor Cantora at the Prêmio Multishow de Música Brasileira (nominated)
- 2016: Best New Artist at the Latin Grammy Award (nominated)
- 2016: Cantora Nacional at the Capricho Awards (nominated)

=== Others ===
- 2012: Melhor Instagram (@sophiaabrahao) at the Capricho Awards (won)
- 2012: Mais Estilosa at the Capricho Awards (won)
- 2013: Celebrity Fashion at the Shorty Awards (won)
- 2013: Casal Real at the Capricho Awards (with Fiuk) (nominated)
- 2013: Melhor Capa da Capricho at the Capricho Awards (won)
- 2013: Melhor Blog at the Capricho Awards (won)
- 2013: Fã-Clube do Ano at the Capricho Awards (nominated)
- 2013: Melhor Blog Jovem at the Prêmio Jovem Brasileiro (won)
- 2013: Tuiteira Favorita (@sophiaabrahao) at the Meus Prêmios Nick (won)
- 2014: Celebridade de 2013 at the Celebridade E! Online (won)
- 2014: Brazil, Instagrammer, Fashion, Blogger at the Shorty Awards (nominated)
- 2014: Capa da Atrê do ano at the Revista Atrevida (nominated)
- 2014: Término do ano at the Revista Atrevida (with Fiuk) (nominated)
- 2014: Fandom do ano at the Revista Atrevida (nominated)
- 2014: Melhor Look de 2014 at the website EGO Globo (won)
- 2014: Atriz mais bem-vestida do ano de 2014 at the Revista Glamour (won)
- 2015: Melhor Look no Baile da Vogue 2015 at the website EGO Globo (won)
- 2015: PopQUEM at the Revista QUEM (won)
- 2015: Brazil at the Shorty Awards (won)
- 2015: Melhor Look no Prêmio Contigo! de TV at the website EGO Globo (won)
- 2015: Site ou blog preferido at the Prêmio Jovem Brasileiro (won)
- 2015: Personalidade jovem do twitter (@sophiaabrahao) at the Prêmio Jovem Brasileiro (won)
- 2015: Melhor instagram de todos os tempos (@sophiaabrahao) at the Prêmio Jovem Brasileiro (won)
- 2015: Jovem do ano at the Prêmio Jovem Brasileiro (nominated)
- 2015: Melhor Casal Real de 2015 at the Capricho Awards (with Sergio Malheiros) (nominated)
- 2015: Mais Estilosa at the Capricho Awards (nominated)
- 2015: It girl do ano at the Prêmio Top TodaTeen (nominated)
- 2016: Jovem do Ano at the Prêmio Jovem Brasileiro (won)
- 2016: Melhor Instagram at the Prêmio Jovem Brasileiro (won)
- 2016: Mais Estilosa at the Capricho Awards (pending)
