= Inés Palombo =

Argentine actress and model

- Born: July 15, 1985 (age 40); Rosario, Santa Fe, Argentina
- Occupations: Actress; Model
- Years active: 2003–present
- Height: 1.63 m (5 ft 4 in)
- Partner: Nicolás Ugarte (2019–present)
- Children: 1

Inés Sofia Palombo (born July 15, 1985) is an Argentine actress and model, she is best known for portraying Sol Rivarola on the hit young television series of Cris Morena, Rebelde Way.

== Career ==
Inés Palombo debuted in 2003 as on Rebelde Way, the hit teenage telenovela of Cris Morena. She portrayed Sol Rivarola, the enemy of Mía Colucci (Luisana Lopilato). After Rebelde Way, she appeared on 2004 teenage telenovela of Morena, Floricienta.

In 2005, Palombo appeared in soap opera 1/2 falta, alongside Gabriela Toscano, Federico D'Elia and Gaston Grande. D'Elia and Grande also both co-starred in Rebelde Way, Grande as Joaquín Arias Parondo, and D'Elia as Professor Miranda. In 2006, she co-starred on telenovela Sos mi vida, starring Natalia Oreiro and Facundo Arana.

In 2007, Palombo portrayed Carolina on hit soap opera Romeo y Julieta, and also was included on Romeo y Julieta soundtrack. She is currently portraying Lily on Atracción x4, starring Luisana Lopilato, Camila Bordonaba and Rodrigo Guirao Díaz.

== Personal life ==
Since 2019, she is in a relationship with Argentine lawyer, Nicolás Ugarte. On January 10, 2022, she gave birth to the couple's first child, a boy, whom they called Felipe Ugarte.

Palombo is very good friends with the Romeo y Julieta star Brenda Gandini.

== Filmography ==
- Rebelde Way (2003) as Sol Rivarola
- Floricienta (2004) as Elena
- 1/2 falta (2005) as Mayi
- Sos mi vida (2006) as Victoria "Vicky" Insúa
- Romeo y Julieta (2007) as Carolina Hernández
- Atracción x4 (2008) as Lily

== Discography ==
=== Soundtrack albums ===
- 2007: Romeo y Julieta
