= Tomás Yankelevich =

Argentine television director and television producer

- Born: December 12, 1977 (age 47); Buenos Aires, Argentina
- Occupations: Television Director; Television Producer
- Years active: 2003–present
- Spouse: Sofía Reca (m. 2008)
- Children: 2
- Parent(s): Gustavo Yankelevich and Cris Morena
- Relatives: Romina Yan (Sister)

Tomás Yankelevich (born December 12, 1977) is an Argentine television director and television producer. The son of Argentine producer and composer Cris Morena and prolific former Telefe director Gustavo Yankelevich and the brother of actress Romina Yan.

== Biography ==
Yankelevich was born in Buenos Aires, Argentina, on December 12, 1977. He is the son of actor Gustavo Yankelevich and actress, producer, director and musician Cris Morena. His father is Jewish. His parents divorced in 1995 when he was eighteen years old. His older sister, actress Romina Yan, died on September 28, 2010, at the Hospital Central de San Isidro, due to a non-traumatic heart attack caused by a aneurysm.

== Personal life ==
On December 20, 2008, Yankelevich married television actress Sofía Reca. On July 24, 2010, the couple's first child was born, a boy who they named Inti Yankelevich. On February 12, 2018, the couple's second child was born, a girl who they named Mila Yankelevich. On July 28, 2025, Mila died after a boating accident in Biscayne Bay, off the coast of Miami Beach. A barge collided with the sailboat she was on around 11:30 AM local time. The impact caused the sailboat, which was carrying six people — including at least one adult — to sink rapidly.

== Career ==
Yankelevich debuted as the producer of talents and reality show Popstars: Argentina, which created girl group Bandana. In 2003, Yankelevich directed film Vivir Intentando, his directing debut, which starred Bandana. The film was a box office hit, as well as its following film Erreway: 4 Caminos, which starred popular pop rock band Erreway. 4 Caminos was directed as the spin–off film of the series Rebelde Way, directed by Yankelevich's mother Cris Morena. In 2005, he directed and wrote the Cris Morena Group series Amor Mio, which starred his sister Romina Yan.

In 2011, Yankelevich produced two series, children-oriented show Super Torpe (aired in Disney Channel) with Pablo Martínez and Candela Vetrano, and Cuando me sonreis, a TELEFE primetime show, with Facundo Arana, Mariana Espósito and Benjamín Rojas. Both shows were produced by his production company Utopia and co-produced by his father's company, RGB Entertainment.

In February 2011, Yankelevich was named the new Telefe director, following the footsteps of his father, who led Telefe from 1989 to 1999.

== Filmography ==
Year	Title	Credited as	Notes
2001	Popstars: Argentina	Producer	(Talents Reality Show)
2003	Vivir Intentando	Director, writer	
2004	Erreway: 4 Caminos	Producer	With Cris Morena Group
2005	Amor Mio	Director, producer	(TV Series) With Cris Morena Group
2011	Super Torpe	Producer	(TV Series)
2011	Cuando me sonreis	Producer	(TV Series)
