= Señales =

Studio album by Erreway
- Released: 29 July 2002
- Recorded: 2002
- Genre: Pop, teen pop, Latin pop, pop rock
- Length: 42:52
- Label: Sony Music/Cris Morena Group
- Producer: Cris Morena

Erreway chronology
Señales (2002)	Tiempo (2003)

Singles from Señales
- 1. "Sweet Baby"; 2. "Bonita de Más"; 3. "Resistiré"; 4. "Inmortal"; 5. "Amor de Engaño"; 6. "Será Porque Te Quiero"

Señales (Spanish: Signs) is the first studio album by Argentine pop rock group Erreway. The album was released through Sony Music and Cris Morena Group on 29 July 2002 (see 2002 in music). It was produced by Cris Morena and Carlos Nilson, who wrote all songs for the album. It was certified Double Platinum by CAPIF.

The song "Rebelde Way" was used as the opening theme for the Cris Morena Group TV soap opera, Rebelde Way (2002–03), which starred Erreway members Camila Bordonaba, Felipe Colombo, Luisana Lopilato and Benjamín Rojas. The album singles — "Sweet Baby", "Bonita de Más", "Resistiré", "Inmortal", "Amor de Engaño" and "Será Porque Te Quiero" — all enjoyed success in the charts in Argentina, Israel and España.

== Track listing ==
1. "Sweet Baby" (Cris Morena, Carlos Nilson) — 03:22
2. "Bonita de Más" (Cris Morena, Carlos Nilson) — 03:15
3. "Pretty Boy" (Cris Morena, Carlos Nilson) — 03:47
4. "Aún Ahora" (Cris Morena, Carlos Nilson) — 03:11
5. "Resistiré" (Cris Morena, Carlos Nilson) — 03:23
6. "Inmortal" (Cris Morena, Carlos Nilson) — 03:47
7. "Amor de Engaño" (Cris Morena, Carlos Nilson) — 04:03
8. "Mi Vida" (Cris Morena, Carlos Nilson) — 04:16
9. "Vale La Pena" (Cris Morena, Carlos Nilson) — 03:04
10. "Será Porque Te Quiero" (Cris Morena, Carlos Nilson) — 03:15
11. "Perder Un Amigo" (Cris Morena, Carlos Nilson) — 03:49
12. "Rebelde Way" (Cris Morena, Carlos Nilson) — 03:38

== Personnel ==
- Erreway
  - Camila Bordonaba — vocals
  - Felipe Colombo — vocals, guitar
  - Luisana Lopilato — vocals
  - Benjamín Rojas — vocals
- Rebelde Way cast — backing vocals
- María Cristina de Giácomi, Carlos Nilson — producing, composing and songwriting

== Chart positions and certifications ==
Chart	Peak	Certification
Argentine Billboard Albums Chart	1	Double Platinum (CAPIF)
Israeli Albums Chart	1	
