= Camino al amor =

2014 Argentine TV series

- Genre: Drama
- Written by: Enrique Estevanez; Marta Betoldi; Gastón Cerana; Leonardo Azamor; Teresa Donato; Guillermo Aliaga; Vicky Crespo
- Starring: Sebastián Estevanez; Mariano Martínez; Juan Darthés; Carina Zampini; María Eugenia Suárez; Betiana Blum; Silvia Kutika; Sofía Reca; Rodolfo Bebán; Sol Estevanez
- Theme music composer: Camila
- Opening theme: Decidiste dejarme
- Country of origin: Argentina
- Original language: Spanish
- No. of seasons: 1
- No. of episodes: 120

Production
- Producer: Enrique Estevanez
- Running time: 60 minutes

Original release
- Network: Telefe
- Release: May 26 – December 22, 2014

Related
- Sres. Papis; Entre caníbales

Camino al Amor is an Argentine telenovela co-produced by L.C. Action Productions and Telefe Contenidos. It premiered on Monday May 26, 2014, at 10:00 pm on the Telefe screen.

Starring Sebastián Estevanez, Carina Zampini, Juan Darthés and Sol Estevanez, with the antagonistic participations of Sofía Reca, Mariano Argento, Josefina Scaglione, Leticia Bredice, Roberto Vallejos and Matías Desiderio. It features the star performances of the first actors Betiana Blum, Rodolfo Bebán, Silvia Kutika and Tina Serrano and the special participations of Mariano Martínez and María Eugenia Suárez.

== Plot ==
Rocco Colucci (Sebastián Estevanez), based in Mexico, has a business of tourist activities, "Rocco Turismo", at the Paradisus Cancun hotel. He celebrates his wedding with Guadalupe (Sofía Reca), who works in the position of Head of Reception, and who has a daughter, Wendy, but in reality she is not her mother, since she stole it when she was barely few days. During the wedding, held in the hotel's gazebo, he receives the call from his sister Gina (Sol Estevanez), communicating the heart attack suffered by his father, Armando (Rodolfo Bebán), with whom Rocco maintains a distancing since discovering the double life he had with Lili (Silvia Kutika), the sister of her mother's best friend, who committed suicide after learning of her husband's betrayal.

Rocco travels to Buenos Aires, full of contradictions, especially regarding who was the great love of his life, Malena Menéndez (Carina Zampini), Lili's niece, whom he abandoned because he considered her wrong, accomplice of the infidelity that unleashed his mother's suicide. Malena, at this time, has married Fernando (Matías Desiderio), with whom she had a son, Tomás. But Fernando fled eight months ago from their lives, due to gambling debts he contracted and led him to suffer threats. The reunion between Rocco and Malena will soon take place, so that they both rediscover the passion that is still alive between them.

Vitto (Mariano Martínez), is the youngest son of an extramarital relationship that Armando Colucci lived with Lili. He is a womanizer type of person, who works in the moving company. He will fall in love with Pía (María Eugenia Suárez), a young woman rebelled to the upper class in which she cradled, who will appear accidentally in her life.

On the other hand, Ángel (Juan Darthés) is Amanda's son (Betiana Blum), is a type of good feeling that is a taxi driver by trade, a vocation singer and a "almost doctor" by profession. Ángel will meet Gina, with whom he will live a passionate love.

== Production and airing ==
The lead actors of Camino al amor are Sebastián Estevanez and Carina Zampini, the same lead actors of the 2012 telenovela Dulce amor. With their work, the telenovela tries to keep the fans of their previous work. Rodolfo Bebán and Betiana Blum are another couple, both are senior actors with prolific careers. Mariano Martínez and María Eugenia Suárez are usually associated with telenovelas from Pol-ka rather than Telefe, and were selected to get a portion of their regular audience.

The premiere of the telenovela had 22.1 rating points. However, as Telefe airs four telenovelas in the prime time (Somos familia, Camino al Amor, the Brazilian Avenida Brasil, and Sres. Papis), it is aired in episodes of half an hour. Sebastián Estevanez commented that short episodes may be inadvisable for the early stages of a telenovela, when it is trying to establish the story and attract an audience, whereas Avenida Brasil may suffer less from it because it was airing their last ones. Carina Zampini commented that the production was asking for episodes of a complete hour. Avenida Brasil ended the Argentine airing on July 7, and Camino al Amor was expanded to a full hour after that.

== International location ==
The scenes in Mexico were recorded in Cancún, where the support of the Office of Visitors and Conventions of Cancún and the Hotel Paradisus Cancún Resort, of the hotel chain Meliã Hotels International. The management driver, Antonio Torres Avila, was responsible for interpreting the priest who married them at the hotel.

== Cast ==
- Sebastián Estevanez as Rocco Colucci
- Mariano Martínez as Vitto Colucci
- Juan Darthés as Ángel Rossi/Ángel Colucci
- Carina Zampini as Malena Menéndez
- María Eugenia Suárez as Pía Arriaga
- Sofía Reca as Guadalupe "Lupe" Alcorta
- Sol Estevanez as Gina Colucci/Gina Levin
- Betiana Blum as Amanda Rossi
- Silvia Kutika as Liliana "Lili" Suárez
- Rodolfo Bebán as Armando Colucci
- Eva De Dominici as Valentina Rossi/Valentina Colucci
- Pablo Martínez as Polo Gaetán
- Josefina Scaglione as Florencia Ríos
- Mariano Argento as Alfonso Arriaga
- Martina Gusmán as Vanesa De La Guarda
- Raúl Taibo as Agustín De La Guarda
- Leticia Brédice as Guillermina Dubois
- Tina Serrano as Nelly Menéndez
- Héctor Calori as Benjamín Levin
- Roberto Vallejos as Camilo Guevara
- Matías Desiderio as Fernando Aguirre
- Alejandro Porro as Tomás Aguirre
- Narella Clausen as Wendy Nieves
- Esteban Prol as Pedro Oberti
- Lucas Velasco as Gabriel "Gabo" Sánchez
- Chachi Telescto as Juliana "Chuni" Mendoza
- Adrián Navarro as Manuel
- Hernán Estevanez as El Mencho
- Fernanda Metilli as Marilina
- Fabio Di Tomaso as Bautista
- Naím Sibara as Delirio
- Pepe Novoa as Montesino
- Valentina Godfrid as Cinthia
- Cristian Sabaz as Monsalvo
