= Brenda Gandini =

Argentine actress and model

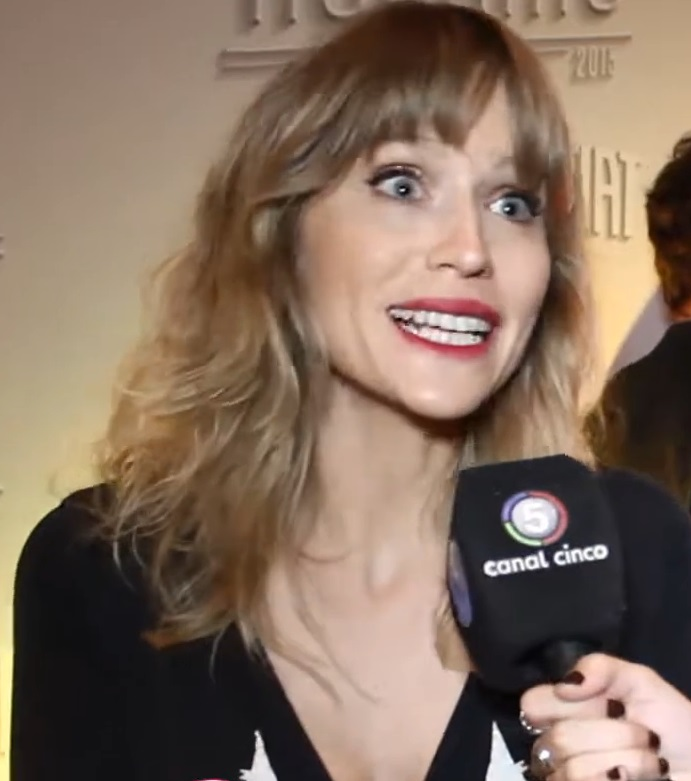
- Born: Brenda Daniela Gandini; Cipolletti, Argentina
- Occupation(s): Model and actress
- Years active: 2003-present
- Height: 1.70 m (5 ft 7 in)
- Partner: Gonzalo Heredia (2010-present)
- Children: 2
- Parent(s): Carlos Gandini and Daniela Cardone
- Relatives: Rolando Pisanú (Maternal half brother)

Brenda Daniela Gandini is an Argentine actress and model.

== Career ==
Gandini was born in Cipolletti, Argentina.

=== Modeling career ===
Brenda Daniela Gandini began her career in modeling in the year 2003 in advertising campaigns. In 2004, she appeared on the cover of the men's magazine Hombre.

=== Television career ===
Gandini began her career in television when she was cast by Cris Morena to be part of the cast of the youth television series Floricienta in 2005. In 2006, makes a small participation in the television series Sos mi vida. In 2006, she makes a small participation in the youth television series Chiquititas. In 2006, she made her film debut, with the movie The Hands. In 2007, she was the protagonist of the television series Romeo y Julieta with Elías Viñoles. In 2007, she was part of the play La jaula de las locas. In 2008, she was part of the cast of the television series Vidas robadas. In 2009, makes a small participation in the television series Ciega a citas. In 2009, she was part of the play El hombre Araña. From 2009 to 2010, she was part of the cast of the youth television series Niní. In 2010, she was part of the cast of the television series Los exitosos Pérez. From 2010 to 2011, she was part of the cast of the television series Malparida. In 2012, she was part of the cast of the television series La Dueña. From 2012 to 2013, she was the protagonist of the television series Mi amor, mi amor with Juan Gil Navarro and Jazmín Stuart. From 2014 to 2015, she was part of the cast of the television series Noche y día. In 2017, she was part of the cast of the television series Amar después de amar. From 2017 to 2019, she was part of the cast of the television series Samuraí. In 2018, she was part of the cast of the television series Morir de amor.

== Personal life ==
Since 2010, Gandini has been in a relationship with the actor Gonzalo Heredia.

Gandini is close friends with her Romeo y Julieta co-star Inés Palombo.

== Filmography ==
=== Television ===
Year	Title	Character	Channel
2005	Floricienta	Olivia Fritzenwalden	Canal 13
2006	Sos mi vida	María Azucena	Canal 13
2006	Chiquititas Sin Fin	Constanza	Telefe
2007	Romeo y Julieta	Julieta Caporale	Canal 9
2008	Vidas robadas	Agustina Amaya	Telefe
2008	Todos contra Juan		América TV
2009	Ciega a citas	Ingrid	TV Pública
2009-2010	Niní	Jazmín	Telefe
2010	Los exitosos Pérez	Adriana	Televisa
2010-2011	Malparida	Bárbara Castro	Canal 13
2011	Historias de la primera vez	Secretary	América TV
2012	La Dueña	Delfina Lacroix Rivero	Telefe
2012-2013	Mi amor, mi amor	Alejandra "Laly" Bonicatto	Telefe
2014-2015	Noche y día	Lucila Villa	Canal 13
2017	Amar después de amar	Alina Cifuentes	Telefe
2017-2019	Samuraí	Link Hiroka	Kids TV
2018	Rizhoma Hotel	Tania	Telefe
2018	Morir de amor	Mora Zubieta	Telefe
2019	Otros pecados		Canal 13

=== Theater ===
Year	Title	Character	Director	Theater
2005	Floricienta, Princesa de la Terraza	Olivia Fritzenwalden	Cris Morena	Teatro Gran Rex
2006	Floricienta, el tour de los sueños	Olivia Fritzenwalden	Cris Morena	
2007	Floricienta, el tour de los sueños en México	Olivia Fritzenwalden	Cris Morena	
2008	La jaula de las locas	Muriel		
2009	Hombre Araña	Mary Jane Watson		
2010	Abrázame	Karen/Cristina		
2014	El secreto de la vida	Sofía	José María Muscari	Teatro Metropolitan Sura
2016	Pieza plástica		Marius von Mayenburg	
2019	Desnudos	Ana	Esther Feldman and Alejandro Maci	Teatro Neptuno

=== Movies ===
Year	Movie	Character	Director
2006	The Hands	Rugged girl	Alejandro Doria
2010	La vieja de atrás	Girl passed out	Pablo José Meza
2013	Mala	Rosario	Israel Adrián Caetano
2016	Las ineses	Carmen	Pablo José Meza
2016	Resentimental		Leonardo Damario

=== Television programs ===
Year	Program	Channel	Notes
2007	Cantando por un Sueño	Canal 13	Participant

=== Videoclips ===
Year	Artist	Song
2006	Luciano Pereyra	Porque aún te amo

== Discography ==
=== Soundtrack albums ===
- 2007: Romeo y Julieta
