= Sofía Reca =

Argentine actress, singer, and television presenter

- Born: 31 March 1984 (age 42); Luján, Buenos Aires Province, Argentina
- Occupations: Actress; Singer; Television presenter
- Years active: 2001–present
- Spouse: Tomás Yankelevich (m. 2008)
- Children: 2
- Relatives: Paula Reca (sister); Cris Morena (mother-in-law); Romina Yan (sister-in-law); Gustavo Yankelevich (father-in-law)

Sofía Reca (born 31 March 1984) is an Argentine actress, singer and television presenter.

== Biography ==
Sofía Reca was born on 31 March 1984, in Luján, Buenos Aires Province, Argentina. She is the oldest of six siblings, her father is one of the main owners of the electricity company Edesur and several gas companies, and former head for Latin America of the US investment bank Merrill Lynch and her mother is a housewife.

== Personal life ==
Reca married director, film producer and screenwriter Tomás Yankelevich on 20 December 2008. On 24 July 2010, she gave birth to the couple's first child, a boy, whom they called Inti Yankelevich. On 12 February 2018, she gave birth to the couple's second child, a girl, whom they called Mila Yankelevich. She is the daughter-in-law of the television producers, Cris Morena and Gustavo Yankelevich, and the sister-in-law of the late actress, Romina Yan. On 29 July 2025, their daughter Mila was killed when the sailboat she was on was struck by a barge in Florida's Biscayne Bay near Miami.

== Filmography ==
=== Television programs ===
Year	Program	Channel	Notes
2001	Disney Magical Moments	Disney Channel	Host
2007–2008	Playhouse Disney Channel Latinoamérica	Disney Channel	Host
2014	Tu cara me suena (Season 2)	Telefe	Imitating Joss Stone

=== Theater ===
Year	Title	Character
2002	El show de Disneymania	Sofía
2006	100 años de magia	Berta

=== Television ===
Year	Title	Character	Channel
2004–2005	Los Roldán	Sofía	Telefe/Canal 9
2005	Paraíso Rock	Alma	Canal 9
2006	El Refugio	Rocío "Rochi" Díaz	Canal 13
2006–2007	Sos mi vida	Clara	Canal 13
2008	The Young and the Restless		CBS
2009–2010	Jake & Blake	Luz Fuentes	Disney Channel
2011	Cuando me sonreís	Lucía Fernández	Telefe
2011	Atrapados	Vicky	Yups Channel
2011–2012	Supertorpe	Michi	Disney Channel/Telefe
2013	Qitapenas	Dolores "Lola" Qitapenas	Telefe
2014	Camino al Amor	Guadalupe "Lupe" Alcorta	Telefe
2015	¿Quién es quién?	Renata Sandoval	Telemundo
2019	Betty en NY	Romina	Telemundo

== Discography ==
=== Albums ===
- 2010 — Upcoming debut album

=== Singles ===
Year	Single	Album	Notes
2005	"Adonde Quiera Que Voy"	Paraíso Rock OST	Soundtrack single
2005	"Tema De Pototo"	Paraíso Rock OST	Soundtrack single
