= Carola Reyna =

Argentine actress and director

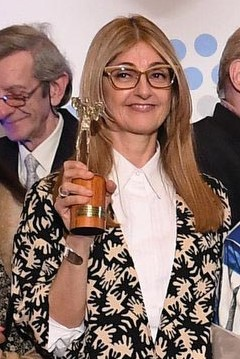
- Reyna in 2017
- Born: Carola Reyna; April 15, 1962 (age 64); Buenos Aires, Argentina
- Years active: 1984–present
- Spouse: Boy Olmi (1994–present)

Carola Reyna (born 15 April 1962) is an Argentine actress and director from Buenos Aires. She has won the ACE Award and the Martin Fierro Awards five times.

== Biography ==
Daughter of TV Producer Eduardo Reyna, she grew up in Argentina, Spain and Venezuela. She studied theatre with Carlos Moreno, Augusto Fernandes, Juan Carlos Gené and Carlos Gandolfo during 1983 to 1986.

Made her debut in the 1980s with Noël Coward's Hay Fever directed by China Zorrilla and Anton Chekhov's The Seagull at the Teatro San Martín.

She is married to actor Boy Olmi since 1994.

== Filmography ==
=== Television ===
- Tal como somos (1984)
- Extraños y Amantes (1985) as Ana María
- Pasión (1990)
- El Oro y el Barro (1992)
- Algunas Mujeres (1992)
- Apasionada (1993) as Claudia
- Nueve Lunas (1995)
- Señoras y Señores (1997) as Lucía
- Ricos y Famosos (1997)
- Gasoleros (1998)
- Casa Natal (1998)
- Tiempofinal (2000) as Clara
- El Solero de Mi Vida (2001) as Leonor Muzzopappa
- Máximo Corazón (2002) as Teresa Quinteros
- ¿Quién es Alejandro Chomski? (2002) as herself
- Sol Negro (2003) as Sabrina de Bustos
- Los Simuladores (2003–2004)
- La Niñera (2004) as Tete
- Amas de Casa Desesperadas (2006) as Vera Sherer (Bree Van de Kamp)
- 4x4 (2008)
- Esperanza mía (2015)

=== Film ===
- El Hombre de la Deuda Externa (1987)
- El Color Escondido (1988) as Helena
- Cuatro caras para Victoria (1992) as Victoria
- Copyright (1993)
- Beautiful (1993)
- El Amante de las Películas Mudas (1994) as Clara
- Casas de Fuego (1995) as Jeanette
- Carlos Monzón, el Segundo Juicio (1996) as Alicia Muñiz
- Vidas Privadas (2001) as Roxana Rodó
- Las Caras de la Luna (2002) as Shosh Balsher
- India Pravile (2003) as Lucila
- La Puta y la Ballena (2004) as Meme
- El Fuego y el Soñador (2005) as Women of Rose

=== Director ===
- ¿Quién es el Jefe? (2005)
