= Jugate conmigo =

- Logo
- Created by: Geoffrey Darby; Michael Klinghoffer; Dee LaDuke; Robert Mittenthal
- Presented by: Cris Morena
- Country of origin: Argentina
- No. of episodes: 700

Production
- Executive producers: Cris Morena, Miguel Angel Rodriguez
- Running time: 42 minutes

Original release
- Network: Telefe
- Release: June 3, 1991 – October 1994

Related
- Chiquititas; Jugate con Todo; (Telefe, 1995)

Jugate Conmigo is an hour-long variety show targeted to teenagers, which was aired on Telefe on weekdays at 6 P.M from 1991 to 1993, and at weekdays at 5 P.M. in 1994. It lasted four seasons and was hosted by Cris Morena. The program was based on the American show Double Dare.

It aired during four seasons, being the leader on its time-slot and spawning sold-out concerts, platinum-selling albums and licensed products. Morena presented the show with a group of ten teenagers which changed twice: one group during 1991 and 1992 and another one from 1993 to 1994.

After four seasons, Morena decided to move on to other projects and to do a weekly variety show Jugate con Todo, which lasted four months and was not as successful.

In 1994, Morena, alongside teenagers of the first two seasons, starred in soap opera Quereme.

Michel Brown, Luciano Castro, Romina Yan among others debuted on television in Jugate Conmigo.

== Format ==
Jugate Conmigo was based on the 1988 show Double Dare from Nickelodeon. It was hosted by Cris Morena alongside a group of ten attractive teenagers, five of each sex. The program was presented in front of an audience of about 700 preteens and teens and the audience and the hosts would participate in different games with big prizes. Those games were the center of the show (Jugate Conmigo is literally an expression that translate as Come Play with Me but it also means Give me your best).

The show also relied heavily on music. Besides musical guests (including Duran Duran, Bon Jovi, Attaque 77, Alejandro Sanz among others), the cast itself sung songs about teen issues like gossip, sex, romantic relationship, kisses, jealously, etc. Those songs were compiled in albums that were released annually and were huge hits. All songs were written by Cris herself alongside her songwriting partner Carlos Nilson.

The show also had sketches and, in 1993, telenovelas were added to the show. Those telenovelas lasted for about one week, had 15 minutes and starred the group of teenagers that hosted the show alongside Cris. In 1994, instead of weekly telenovelas of 15 minutes, Life College, a 30-minute telenovela about life in an elite boarding school, was aired inside the show during the entire year.

The members from the staff were: 1991/1992: Romina Yan, Octavio Borro, Gaspar Teverovsky, Andy, Eric, Hernán Caire, Pamela Rodriguez, Carla, Carolina, Agustina, Mariana, Giselle, María Susini, Moira Gough, Coraje Avalos and Sebastian. In 1993/1994: Luciano Castro, Michel Brown, Nano, Chino Fernandez, Mariano, Trinidad Alcorta, Felicitas, Manuela, Ana Korn and Micaela.

== Success ==
The show was a gigantic hit, becoming a phenomenon among the young public. It was the leader in its time-slot during all four seasons and caused hysteria in live concerts and signings across the country. The cast did one nationwide tour, a series of concerts in Estadio Obras in Buenos Aires in 1992 and over 50 live presentations in Teatro Gran Rex in 1994.

The albums sung by the cast of the show were released annually and were very successful achieving multiple platinum certifications. In 1993 and in 1994, Jugate Conmigo vol. 2 and Jugate Conmigo vol. 3 were the best-selling albums of the year in Argentina.

Although the show was panned by critics, it won two Martin Fierro Awards for Best Entertainment Programs.
