= Carlos Nilson =

Carlos "Rocky" Nilson (Nilson Carlos Zulisber) was born in Montevideo, Uruguay. During his teenage years, he was a hippie addicted to rock music. When he was 15 years old, he moved to Buenos Aires, Argentina. He had success as one of the members of the beat and rock band Los Náufragos but his subsequent works as a solo artist didn't achieve success.

In the late 1970s he moved to Europe and he returned to Argentina in the late 80's, where he worked singing commercial jingles. He met Cris Morena and both became songwriter partners. Later, they became the most profitable songwriters in the country.

Alongside Cris, he composed the songs of all her programs from 1991 to 2006. He did the melodies for Jugate Conmigo, Chiquititas, Verano del 98, Rebelde Way, Rincón de Luz, Floricienta and Alma Pirata. Also with Cris, he composed songs for commercials and many different Telefe TV shows such as Videomatch, Ritmo de la Noche, Cebollitas, Mi Familia es un Dibujo. In the late 80's, they were responsible for all songs in Flavia Palmiero's CDs. He wrote over 1000 songs for different Latin and Italian acts and artists.

In 2007, he ended his association with Cris and signed with production company Ideas de Sur. He was responsible for music in Patito Feo (the first album, released in 2007, was the best-selling album in Argentina during that year), Atracción x 4 and Consentidos.
