= Elías Viñoles =

Argentine actor, singer, and musician

- Born: Raúl Elías Viñoles; October 21, 1988 (age 37); Neuquén, Argentina
- Occupations: Actor, singer and musician
- Years active: 2003–present
- Height: 1.73 m (5 ft 8 in)

Raúl Elías Viñoles (born October 21, 1988, in Neuquén, Argentina) is an Argentine-American actor, singer and musician.

== Personal life ==
Elías Viñoles was in a relationship for several years with Argentine entrepreneur, actress and model, Olivia Molina.

== Career ==
Viñoles attended his first acting class in 1998. His first role was in 2004 awarded film Familia Rodante, and his first TV role was "Bruno Sampardi" in the 2005 TV series 1/2 Falta.

In 2006, he portrayed "José Fernández" in TV series Sos mi vida, with Natalia Oreiro and Facundo Arana. He was awarded by Clarin Award for Best New Actor.

Viñoles attained his first lead role in 2007, as Romeo in Romeo y Julieta, a teenage television version of William Shakespeare's Romeo and Juliet; performing alongside Brenda Gandini. The same year ended with a leading role in the pshyco-sexual comedy Las Hermanas L, with Soledad Silveyra.

In 2008, he achieved one of the lead roles in the nominated drama film Toda la gente sola, alongside Alejandro Urdapilleta and Érica Rivas. The second part of the year started with the leading role in the TV series Atracción x4 with Luisana Lopilato, Camila Bordonaba and Rodrigo Guirao Diaz. And finished the year, working alongside Martina Stella in the drama series for Italy, Donne assassine

In 2012 he returns to TV with the production company Pol-ka, for the second season of Los Únicos, playing one of the villains of the series. In the same year he plays Bernardo de Monteagudo in the historical drama with multiple nominations, Historia Clínica, and begins with the rehearsals of Vivir Desconectados, a play that began in 2013 with Jorge Sassi.

Year 2013 with Vivir Desconectados still in play, Viñoles stars the dramatic telefilm Historias de corazón next to Florencia Raggi.

Viñoles starts the 2014 starring the miniseries nominated to the International Emmy, La Celebración, and the political drama television series nominated to Martín Fierro, Televisión por la justicia: Santos y pecadores, and is summoned again by Telefe to be a special guest in the telefilm Señores Papis.

In the year 2015, Viñoles is called by the same producers of Santos y pecadores to star in the comedy miniseries Conflictos modernos, while at the same time he launches what would be the first single of his musical material, Dejar de Pensar, on different digital platforms. While at the beginning of 2016, he releases his second single, Tanto Tiempo.

In addition to the release of the second cut, in 2016 he is dedicated to the theatrical show directed by Ricky Pashkus, Hombre Viajando en Taxi, in the prestigious Centro Cultural General San Martín.

== Filmography ==
=== Television ===
Year	Title	Character	Channel
2003	Rebelde Way	Dante	Canal 9
2005	1/2 Falta	Bruno Zampardi	Canal 13
2006	Sos mi vida	José Fernández	Canal 13
2007	Romeo y Julieta	Romeo Montero	Canal 9
2008–2009	Atracción x4	Keto Milhojas	Canal 13
2012	Los únicos	Borja	Canal 13
2012	Historia clínica	Bernardo de Monteagudo	Telefe
2013	Historias de corazón	Julián	Telefe
2014	La celebración	Francisco	Telefe
2014	Sres. Papis	Román	Telefe
2014	Televisión por la justicia	Ariel Arbizu	Canal 9
2015	Conflictos modernos		Canal 9

=== Movies ===
Year	Movie	Character	Director
2004	Familia rodante	Gustavo	Pablo Trapero
2005	El Mensaje	Esteban	Steve Akerman
2009	Toda la gente sola	Damián	Alejandro Montiel, Santiago Giralt and Diego Schipani
2010	Las hermanas L	Bruno	Santiago Giralt

=== Theater ===
Year	Title	Character	Director	Theater
2013	Vivir desconectados	Lucas	Jorge Sassi	
2016	Hombre viajando en taxi	The Man	Ricky Pashkus	

== Awards and nominations ==
Year	Award	Category	Work	Result
2006	Clarín Awards	Male Revelation	Sos mi vida	Winner
