= Rodolfo Bebán =

Argentine actor (1938–2022)

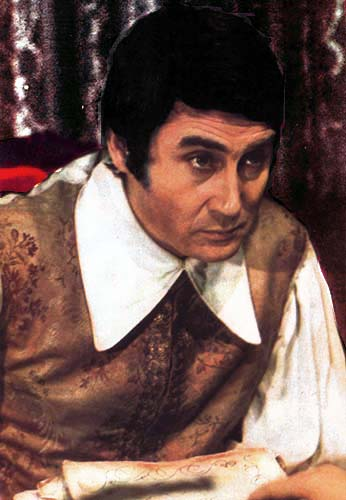
- Born: 25 May 1938; Ciudadela, Buenos Aires, Argentina
- Died: 14 August 2022 (aged 84)
- Occupation: Actor
- Years active: 1962–2022

Rodolfo Bebán (25 May 1938 – 14 August 2022) was an Argentine actor. He appeared in more than forty films between 1962 and 2022.

Bebán died on 14 August 2022, at the age of 84.

== Selected filmography ==
Film
Year	Title	Role	Notes
1966	Arm in Arm Down the Street		
1966	Hotel alojamiento		
1973	Juan Moreira	Juan Moreira	
1978	El Fantástico mundo de María Montiel		

TV
Year	Title	Role	Notes
2014	Camino al amor	Armando Colucci	
