= Niní =

- Genre: Comedy; Romance
- Created by: Florencia Bertotti Kuido Kaczka
- Written by: Gabriela Fiore; Jorge Chernov
- Directed by: Daniel De Felippo; Jesús Braceras; Emilio Medina
- Starring: Florencia Bertotti; Federico Amador; Paula Morales; Juan Manuel Guilera; Melanie Chong; Sheyner Cristian Gomez; Iara Munoz; Vanesa Butera; Esteban Meloni; Gigi Bonaffino; Esteban Masturini; Paula Sartor; Hector Diaz; Adriana Ferrer; Andrea Resava; Juan Pablo Urrego; Maida Andreacci; Pablo Napoli; Sebastian Monogrody
- Theme music composer: Florencia Bertotti
- Opening theme: Arriba Las Ilusiones
- Country of origin: Argentina
- Original languages: Spanish; Romanian; Italian
- No. of seasons: 1
- No. of episodes: 137

Production
- Producers: Florencia Bertotti; Guido Kaczka; Martin Kweller; Federico Posternak
- Production location: Buenos Aires
- Editor: Cris Morena
- Running time: 45 minutes
- Production companies: Endemol; Kaberplay; Telefe Contenidos

Original release
- Network: Disney Channel; Telefe
- Release: September 7, 2009 – April 16, 2010

Niní is an Argentine children's telenovela. Produced by Florencia Bertotti and her ex-husband Guido Kaczka together with Endemol and Telefe Contenidos. It is written by Gabriela Fiore and Jorge Chernov. It was aired from September 7, 2009, Monday through Thursday by Telefe at 6 pm. It stars Florencia Bertotti and Federico Amador. Co-starring the actress Maida Andrenacci. With the antagonistic participation of Paula Morales and Esteban Meloni.

== Plot ==
Niní tells the story of Nina Gómez, an innocent girl, somewhat distracted, spontaneous and with a big heart, who has been left alone with her grandfather, the gardener of the embassy in which they live. The life of Nina it is altered with the arrival of the new ambassador, Tomás Parker (Federico Amador), an orderly and distant man. Tomás Parker arrives at the mansion accompanied by his ambitious secretary Celina Martínez Paz (Paula Morales) and his four adopted children, who, having been born in different countries, form a heterogeneous and very particular family. Niní, who quickly becomes fond of the kids, she must overcome several obstacles to be able to remain in the embassy next to them. To the point that she ends up disguising herself as a man and becoming Nicolás, the new ambassador's driver. Niní will fall madly in love with Tomás just like he does with her. From now on a delicious plot begins to develop where Niní, with its simplicity and brightness, will reach the heart of the Parkers, transmitting values that neither power nor money can get, freedom, love and a sense of humor outside of the usual. But things will get complicated when Nicolás appears, who is actually Niní disguised as a man.

== Cast ==
- Florencia Bertotti as Nina "Niní" Gómez/Nicolás Zampanó
- Paula Chaves as Violeta Barranco
- Brenda Gandini as Jazmín
- Sofía Zámolo as Tamara
- Juan Pablo Urrego as Tony
- Federico Amador as Tomás Parker
- Juan Manuel Guilera as Martín Parker
- Melanie Chong as Chow Parker
- Sheyner Cristian Díaz Gómez as Chama Chan Parker
- Iara Muñoz as Sicilia Parker
- Néstor Zacco as Máximo Parker
- Paula Morales as Celina Martínez Paz
- Esteban Meloni as Víctor Martínez Paz
- Maida Andrenacci as Victoria Acuña
- Mario Moscoso as George Mc Gruster
- Héctor Díaz as Horacio Raymundi
- Vanesa Butera as Carmen Juárez
- Giselle Bonaffino as Lola Benítez
- Sebastián Mogordoy as Ángel Espósito
- Esteban Masturini as Juan Espósito
- Diego Gentile as Sebastián Gallardo
- Pablo Napoli as Hector Gómez
- Paula Sartor as Sofía Anzoátegui
- Antonia Bengoechea as Zoe Anzoátegui
- Valentín Villafañe as Abel López
- Fernando Sureda as Diego de la Fuente
- Ernesto Claudio as Dt. Bartoli
- Emilio Bardinas Juan Alberto
- Marta Paccamicci as Lupe
- Natalia Jascalevich as Thais
- Adriana Ferrer as Adelfa
- César Bordón as Abdel
- Victoria Tortora as Carla
- Leonardo Saggese as Alejandro
- Irene Goldszer as Lorena

== Soundtrack ==
The soundtrack for the series was released On November 9, 2009. The CD is called Arriba las ilusiones. The CD contained video clips for two of the songs and included a gift poster. Within a few weeks of its release it had received its first gold record for sales. All the songs are performed by Florencia Bertotti.

== International Broadcasters ==
=== Américas ===
- Argentina: Telefe Internacional
- Colombia: Caracol
- Costa Rica: Canal 4
- Dominican Republic: Telesistema
- Ecuador: Ecuavisa
- Guatemala: Canal 3
- Mexico: Tiin
- Nicaragua: Televicentro
- Panama: Televisora Nacional
- Paraguay: Paravisión
- Peru: La Tele, Red Global and ATV Sur
- Uruguay: Canal 4

=== Europe ===
- Bulgaria: Disney Channel Bulgaria
- Italy: Disney Channel Italy, Boing Italy
- Spain: Disney Channel
- Romania: Boomerang, TCM and Disney Channel Romania
- Ukraine: Disney Channel Ukraine

== Awards and nominations ==
Award	Category	Result
Martín Fierro Award 2010	Best children's show	Nominated
Carlos Gardel Award 2010	Best movie or television soundtrack	Nominated

== Theater ==
Niní was adapted to theater in a play called Nini, The Search. All the characters were featured on stage singing and dancing the songs from the original show. The play made its debut on January 24, 2010, in Mar del Plata. The second showing took place on February 27, 2010 in the Orfeo Superdome in Córdoba. More than 5,500 people attended the show. The run ended its season at the Gran Rex theater in Buenos Aires, with over 35,000 people in attendance.

The show was also presented for the first time in Florence, Italy in November 2010.

== Legal dispute ==
In 2010, producer Gustavo Yankelevich filed a plagiarism lawsuit on behalf of RGB Entertainment and Cris Morena Group, alleging that Niní was a copy of the telenovela Floricienta, which Bertotti starred in during the 2004-2005 TV season. The Argentinian courts ruled in favor of the complainants, and Niní was pulled off the air on April 16, 2010, despite earlier reports of an agreement between the two parties. The double-episode ending drew record ratings.
