= Florencia Bertotti =

Argentine actress, singer, songwriter and businesswoman

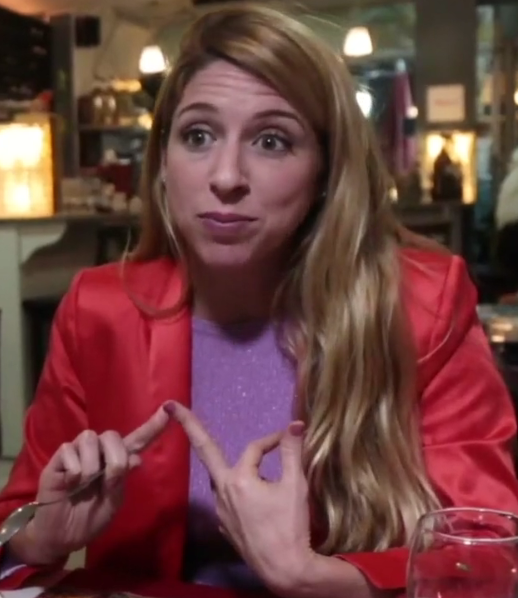
- Bertotti in 2018
- Born: María Florencia Bertotti; 15 March 1983 (age 42); Buenos Aires, Argentina
- Occupations: Actress; singer; songwriter; businesswoman
- Years active: 1995–present
- Spouse: Guido Kaczka (m. 2006; div. 2010)
- Partner: Federico Amador (2010–present)
- Children: 1

María Florencia Bertotti (born 15 March 1983), better known as Florencia Bertotti is an Argentine actress, singer, songwriter and businesswoman.

== Biography ==
Florencia Bertotti parents are Gustavo Bertotti, a jeweler and María Candelaria Pérez Colman, a psychologist and a teacher of children with disabilities. Her parents divorced when Florencia was seven years old. She has an older sister called Clara Bertotti. Her father died in 1999 when she was filming the series Verano del '98. Florencia studied at the Colegio Nuestra Señora de la Misericordia in Recoleta, Buenos Aires, Argentina.

== Personal life ==
On 2 December 2006 she got married in a religious ceremony with Guido Kaczka, whom she met in the recordings of Verano del '98 and who was her boyfriend since then. On 10 July 2008, she gave birth to the couple's first child, a boy, whom they called Romeo Kaczka Bertotti. The couple divorced in March 2010. They both share custody of their son.

Since 2010, Florencia Bertotti is in a relationship with the actor, Federico Amador.

== Career ==
María Florencia Bertotti began her career in television with an advertising of jams Arcor in 1995. After several television advertisements, in 1995, she makes a small participation in the television series Dulce Ana.

In 1996, she makes a small participation in the television series 90 60 90 modelos.

From 1996 to 1998, she was part of the cast of the television series De corazón.

In 1998, she made her film debut, with a film of the students of the University of Cinema, Mala época. In 1998, she play the leading role of little Aneta in the movie El Faro.

From 1999 to 2000, she was part of the cast of the youth television series Verano del '98.

From 2000 to 2001, she was part of the cast of the television series Luna salvaje.

In 2001, she was part of the cast of the television series Culpables. In 2001, she acted in the movie Déjala correr.

From 2002 to 2003, she was part of the cast of the television series Son amores.

In 2004, she was part of the cast of the television series Los pensionados.

From 2004 to 2005, she was the protagonist of the youth television series Floricienta with Juan Gil Navarro and Fabio Di Tomaso.

In late 2008, it was announced that Florencia Bertotti would return to television with a new telenovela targeted to children, which would be produced by her and her husband Guido Kaczka. From 2009 to 2010, she was the protagonist of the youth television series Niní with Federico Amador, this television series was produced and directed by her and her husband Guido Kaczka.

In 2010 she returned to the cinema with Igualita a mí produced by Patagonik which she stars alongside Adrián Suar.

In 2012, Florencia Bertotti played the co-starring role of Amparo Lacroix in the television series La Dueña.

In 2014, she was the protagonist of the television series Guapas with Mercedes Morán, Araceli González, Carla Peterson and Isabel Macedo. She composed the musical curtain for the series Guapas with Willie Lorenzo, which was interpreted by Fabiana Cantilo.

In 2016 Florencia Bertotti returns to television starring in the series Silencios de familia with Adrián Suar and Julieta Díaz.

In 2017, she acted in the movie Casi leyendas. In 2017, she composed the musical curtain for the series Las Estrellas with Willie Lorenzo, which was interpreted by Daniela Herrero. In 2017, she composed the musical curtain for the series Simona with Willie Lorenzo, which was interpreted by Ángela Torres.

In 2018, she directed the choreography for the opening of Bailando 2018 with the cast of the series Simona.

In 2019, she was part of the play 100 metros cuadrados with María Valenzuela and Stéfano de Gregorio directed by Manuel González Gil.

== Other work ==
On 6 May 2013, Florencia Bertotti opened her own clothing store for children, babies and mothers, which she called Pancha Buenos Aires by Florencia Bertotti. On 15 March 2021, Florencia Bertotti launched a new space, which she called Pancha Recreo, this section contains reclaimed wood games, without batteries, without rules and without instructions to accompany the little ones in their different stages of development and growth. In this new section there is also a great variety of books for children of different ages, which were specially chosen and previously read by Florencia Bertotti.

== Filmography ==
=== Television ===
Year	Title	Character	Channel
1995	Dulce Ana		Canal 9
1996	90 60 90 modelos	Verónica Argüello	Canal 9
1997–1998	De corazón	Vicky	Canal 13
1999–2000	Verano del '98	Dolores "Lola" Guzmán de Levin	Telefe
2000–2001	Luna salvaje	Sol Guelar	Telefe
2001	Culpables	Sofía	Canal 13
2002–2003	Son amores	Valeria Marquesi	Canal 13
2004	Los pensionados	Florencia	Canal 13
2004–2005	Floricienta	Florencia Fazzarino Valente/Florencia Santillán Valente	Canal 13
2009–2010	Niní	Nina "Niní" Gómez/Nicolás Zampano	Telefe
2012	La Dueña	Amparo Lacroix	Telefe
2014	Guapas	Lorena Patricia Giménez	Canal 13
2016	Silencios de familia	Fabiana Aniello	Canal 13

=== Movies ===
Year	Movie	Character	Director
1998	Mala época	Connie	Nicolás Saad, Mariano De Rosa, Salvador Roselli and Rodrigo Moreno
1998	El Faro	Aneta	Eduardo Mignogna
2001	Déjala correr	Belén	Alberto Lecchi
2010	Igualita a mí	Aylin	Diego Kaplan
2017	Casi leyendas	Sol	Gabriel Nesci

=== Theater ===
Year	Title	Character	Director	Theater
2002	Son amores	Valeria Marquesi		
2004	Floricienta en el Teatro	Florencia Fazzarino Valente/Florencia Santillán Valente	Cris Morena	Teatro Gran Rex
2005	Floricienta, Princesa de la Terraza	Florencia Fazzarino Valente/Florencia Santillán Valente	Cris Morena	Teatro Gran Rex
2006	Floricienta, el tour de los sueños	Florencia Fazzarino Valente/Florencia Santillán Valente	Cris Morena	
2007	Floricienta, el tour de los sueños en México	Florencia Fazzarino Valente/Florencia Santillán Valente	Cris Morena	
2010	Niní: La búsqueda	Nina "Niní" Gómez/Nicolás Zampano		
2019	100 metros cuadrados	Sara	Manuel González Gil	Teatro Multitabaris

== Discography ==
=== Soundtrack albums ===
- 2004 — Floricienta
- 2005 — Floricienta
- 2007 — Floricienta
- 2009 — Niní

== Awards and nominations ==
Year	Award	Category	Work	Result
1999	Silver Condor Awards	Female Revelation	El Faro	Nominated
2002	Martín Fierro Awards	Best Leading Actress in Comedy	Son amores	Winner
2003	Martín Fierro Awards	Best Leading Actress in Comedy	Son amores	Winner
2003	INTE Awards	Youth Talent of the Year	Son amores	Nominated
2003	Clarín Awards	Best Television Actress	Son amores	Winner
2005	Martín Fierro Awards	Best Leading Actress in Telecomedia	Floricienta	Nominated
2006	Martín Fierro Awards	Best Leading Actress in Telecomedia	Floricienta	Nominated
2016	Tato Awards	Actress Protagonist of Comedy	Silencios de familia	Nominated
2017	Martín Fierro Awards	Best Actress of Miniseries	Silencios de familia	Nominated
2019	ACE Awards	Best Leading Actress in a Comedy	100 metros cuadrados	Nominated

== Tours ==
=== With Floricienta ===
- «Floricienta: en el Gran Rex» (2004)
- «Floricienta: Princesa de la Terraza Tour» (2005)
- «Tour de los Sueños» (2006)
- «Floricienta: Tour de los Sueños en México» (2007)

=== With Niní ===
- «Niní: la búsqueda»(2010)

=== Solo career ===
- «Locura» (2022)
- «Flor Bertotti en concierto» (2023-2024)
- «Otra vuelta tour» (2025)
