= Sres. Papis (Argentine TV series) =

- Genre: Telenovela
- Created by: Marcela Guerty; Pamela Rementería
- Written by: Cecilia Guerty; Pablo Junovich
- Directed by: Pablo Vásquez; Gustavo Luppi; Omar Aiello
- Starring: Luciano Castro; Joaquín Furriel; Luciano Cáceres; Peto Menahem
- Theme music composer: Bersuit Vergarabat
- Opening theme: Cuatro vientos
- Country of origin: Argentina
- Original language: Spanish
- No. of seasons: 1
- No. of episodes: 184

Production
- Executive producer: Chacho Cordone
- Producer: Telefe Contenidos
- Running time: 30–45 minutes

Original release
- Network: Telefe
- Release: January 6 – November 27, 2014

Related
- Mi amor, mi amor; Camino al amor

Sres. Papis is an Argentine telenovela produced and broadcast by the Telefe network. It premiered on January 6, 2014 and ended on November 27 of the same year. It aired Monday through Friday, except Wednesdays, at 11:30 p.m. The series was written by Cecilia Guerty and Pablo Junovich, and directed by Gustavo Luppi, Omar Aiello and Pablo Vásquez. It starred Luciano Castro, Joaquín Furriel, Luciano Cáceres and Peto Menahem.

== Plot ==
The story follows the experiences of four modern parents Favio Carbonetti (Luciano Castro), Ignacio Moreno (Joaquín Furriel), Franco Bertossi (Luciano Cáceres) and Mauro de Leone (Peto Menahem), who become friends by sharing daily talks at the door of their children's kindergarten. In addition to accompanying each other in conflicts, vicissitudes, juggling, surprises and abysses of paternity, the plot follows the personal stories of each parent. By meeting the door of the kindergarten daily, these four men bond over similar parenting struggles and form a lasting friendship.

== Premise ==
The main topic of the telenovela is male paternity, as the main characters have different back stories but all raise children with little or no female help. This topic was addressed very few times before in Argentine telenovelas, such as in the old telenovelas Papá corazón and Grande, pa!. Somos familia (2014) and Solamente Vos (2013) are other Argentine telenovelas that also explored male paternity. Actor Luciano Cáceres described the main characters as antiheroes, with several emotional weaknesses.

== Production ==
Actress Julieta Díaz rejected a proposal to work in the telenovela, as she had plans to work in films during 2014. She declined to work in other Argentine fictions, such as Guapas and Viudas e hijos del Rock and Roll, for a similar reason. The production staff proposed that she could appear as a guest star for 25 episodes. She accepted this proposal, and her role in the story will be that of a cumbia singer, with cumbia songs composed especially for the program.

Production will move to neighbouring Brazil to film scenes for the program during the 2014 FIFA World Cup. It is not confirmed if Cáceres will take part in the project, as he also performs in theater plays.

== Reception ==
The program premiered on January 6, 2014. It received 13.9 rating points, prevailing over the telenovelas aired by El Trece.

== Cast ==
- Luciano Castro as Favio “Chori” Carbonetti
- Joaquín Furriel as Ignacio “Nacho” Moreno
- Luciano Cáceres as Franco Bertossi
- Peto Menahem as Mauro de Leone
- Gloria Carrá as Carla de Leone
- Marcela Kloosterboer as Helena Villaverde
- Laura Novoa as Rocío Soler
- Vanesa González as Luján Cisneros
- Luis Luque as Roberto “Roby” Carbonetti
- Patricia Palmer as Nelly Moreno
- Luis Brandoni as Rafael Rodríguez Merlo
- Julieta Díaz as Daiana Crespo
- Martina Gusmán as Karina Crespo
- Juan Pedro Lanzani as Martín Frenkel
- Elías Viñoles as Román Villaverde
- Silvina Luna as Sabrina Menéndez
- María Abadi as Emma Valente
- Tupac Larriera as Luca Carbonetti
- Martina Campos as Nina de Leone
- Eugenia Alonso as María Inés García Sastre
- Ignacio Toselli as Luis Miguel “Carucha” Fornari
- Agustín Bello as Pedro Carbonetti
- Uma Salduende as Vera Carbonetti
- Naomi Kogan as Julia Bertossi
- Justina Ceballos as Julia Teen
- Manuel Cumelen Marcer as Thiago de Leone
- Marco Bertelli as Yónatan “Yoni” Crespo
- Olivia Gutiérrez as Morena Bertossi
- Georgina Frescó as Morena Teen
- Marcela Guerty as Giselle Pastor
- Mario Alarcón as Hilario de Leone
- Benjamín Amadeo as José Pablo Arregui
- Diego Alonso Gómez as Ezequiel Torres
- Mercedes Oviedo as Sofía Rodríguez Merlo
- Emilio Bardi as Elías Ibáñez
- Guillermo Marcos as Herrero Sánchez
- Sandra Criolani as Trinidad “Trini Bertossi
- Edgardo Moreira as Dardo Páez Vila
- Giselle Motta as Abril Páez Vila
- Sheila González as Susana Carson
- Belén Persello as Jessica Venturini
- Diego Márquez as Javier Griesa
- Gabriel Villalba as Lenny Castro
- Rodrigo Gosende as Luis Venturini
- Nicolás Fiore as Danilo Rodríguez Merlo
- Mónica Scapparone as Anyelina Yoli
- Mónica Antonópulos as Mariana Negri
- Marco Antonio Caponi as Julián
- Lito Cruz as Dios
- Julieta Cardinali as Magdalena
- Noelia Marzol as Daniela
- Luis Gianneo as Edgar
- Gustavo Conti as Bernardo
- Leonardo Astrada as Himself
- Diego Gentile as Benicio
- Fabián Arenillas as Mosca
- Sabrina Carballo as Zoé
- Magela Zanotta as Andrea
- Lucrecia Oviedo as Gala
- Rocío Domínguez as Nani
- Fernanda Metilli as Paula
- Agustina Vícoli as Pato
- Diego Leske as Manfrini»
- Lorena Vega as Juana
- Belén Chavanne as Pía
- Jorge Varas as García
- Florencia Tesouro Naty
- Facundo Parolari as Pato
- Selva Lione as Sandra
- Daniel Gallardo as César
- Mario Moscoso as Benavídez
- Valentina Lanuza as Lucía
- Analía Couceyro as Jimena
- Agustín Sullivan as Alejo
- Florencia González as Mecha
- Javier Pedersoli as Osvaldo
- Anita Gutiérrez as Anahí
- Emme as Celeste
- Marcelo Melingo as Ulises
- Federico Barga as Chaki
- Richard Wagener as Catriel
- Sandra Villami as Curinaria
- Natalia Santiago as Flor
- Sol Gaschetto as Fernanda
- Ana Laura Moscatto as Marisa
- Ayelen Dotti as Laura
- Marcelo Xicarts as Dante
- Agostina Fabrizio as Magali
- Hernán Márquez as Father of Magali
