= Romeo y Julieta (TV series) =

2007 Argentine soap opera

- Genre: Telenovela
- Created by: Raúl Lecouna
- Written by: Raúl Lecouna
- Directed by: Raúl Lecouna
- Starring: Elías Viñoles, Brenda Gandini
- Opening theme: "Romeo y julieta" (Óscar Quijano)
- Country of origin: Argentina
- Original language: Spanish
- No. of seasons: 1
- No. of episodes: 150

Production
- Producer: Central Park Productions
- Cinematography: Various

Original release
- Network: Azul TV
- Release: 2007

Romeo y Julieta is an Argentine soap opera based on the play of the same name by William Shakespeare. It stars Brenda Gandini and Elias Viñoles and is set in the present day. It premiered on March 14, 2007 on Channel 9.

== Plot ==
Julieta Caporale and Romeo Montero are students, who meet in the streets of the picturesque Verona. Both believe deeply in true love and wish to explore the magical setting in which took place the tragic story of the couple of Shakespeare. Julieta is a lovely young lady aged 16. Beautiful, lively, romantic and passionate about photography. Hates the superficial world of her parents and she dreams to meet the man of her life. After encouragement of her father, Vittorio, she enters a superficial relationship with the Polo. Her father, taking advantage of the situation, seeks a marriage between them to serve his own interests. Romeo is about 17 years old. He's cute and clever. He loves music and literature and has many spiritual concerns. Extremely romantic, he knows how to speak beautifully. He goes out with Barbara and believes he is in love with her, but realizes that Julieta is the great love of his life. A number of coincidences bring insurmountable obstacles in the relationship of two young kids: Their families have been for decades in vendetta and hatred passed from generation to generation. Their descendants, however, Romeo and Julieta, will mingle in school and eventually live a love that will divide their classmates and friends to supporters and opponents.

== Cast and characters ==
- Elías Viñoles – Romeo Montero
- Brenda Gandini – Julieta Caporale
- Magalí Moro – Isabel Campos de Caporale
- César Vianco – Vittorio Caporale
- Benjamín Amadeo – Leo Caporale
- Graciela Tenenbaum – Rosa Medina
- Diana Lamas – Elena Pereyra de Montero
- Álex Benn – Bruno Montero
- Jessica Schultz – Amalia Verbena
- Tony Lestingi – Arturo Verbena
- Elsa Pinilla – Barbara Verbena
- Edward Nutkiewicz – Donato Caporale
- Jorge García Marino – Natalio Caporale
- Anahí Martella – Perla
- César Bordón – Padre Antonio
- Bernarda Pagés – Catherine Sullivan
- Norberto Gonzalo – Pedro Edmundo Panetti
- Sofía Elliot – Luz Ansaldi
- Sebastián Pajoni – Gaspar Ferro

== Soundtrack ==
- 01 – Juntando Estrellas (Dolores Sarmiento, Elías Viñoles, Brenda Gandini y Benjamín Amadeo) Autores: (Ezequiel Suárez – P. Ramírez)
- 02 – Amor Prohibido (Brenda Gandini y Elías Viñoles) Autores: (Ezequiel Suárez – P. Ramírez)
- 03 – Hey (Brenda Gandini) Autores: (Ezequiel Suárez – P. Ramirez)
- 04 – Muriendo de Amor (Jazmín Beccar-Varela, Ariadna Asturzzi, Dolores Sarmiento y Liz Moreno) Autores: (Claudio Leda – Pablo Ramírez)
- 05 – Amigas (Brenda Gandini e Inés Palombo) Autores: (Ezequiel Suárez – P. Ramírez)
- 06 – Rompiendo Barreras (Benjamín Amadeo) Autores: (Ezequiel Suárez – P. Ramírez)
- 07 – Flechazo (Brenda Gandini) Autores: (Ezequiel Suárez- P. Ramírez)
- 08 – Gotas de Amor (Elsa Pinilla) Autores: (Ezequiel Suárez – P. Ramírez)
- 09 – Ni Medio Segundo (Elías Viñoles) Autores: (Ezequiel Suárez – P. Ramírez)
- 10 – Amor Letal (Brenda Gandini y Elsa Pinilla) Autores: (Ezequiel Suárez – P. Ramírez)
- 11 – Dentro de Mí (Elías Viñoles) Autores: (Ezequiel Suárez – P. Ramírez)
- 12 – Flechazo (remix) (Brenda Gandini) Autores: (Ezequiel Suárez – P. Ramírez)
- 13 – Mi Dulce Bombón (Elías Viñoles) Autores: (Ezequiel Suárez – P. Ramírez)

In the Greek version of Romeo y Julieta most of the songs been translated in a Greek version, some of them are

- Anikiti Agapi
- Otan mas apagorevoun thn agapi afti-(Amor Prohibido)

== Worldwide syndication ==
- Panama: TVN
- Greece: ET1, ET3
- Spain: Sony Entertainment Television and Jetix
- Colombia: Telepacífico
- Uruguay: Monte Carlo TV
- Cyprus: ANT1 Cyprus
- Israel: Jetix
- Georgia: Rustavi 2
