= Pablo Martínez (actor) =

Argentine actor, singer and model (born 1987)

- Born: Pablo Martínez; 7 November 1987 (age 38); La Plata, Buenos Aires Province, Argentina
- Occupations: Actor, singer and musician
- Years active: 2008–2017

Pablo Martínez (Spanish pronunciation: [ˈpaβlo maɾˈtines]; La Plata, Buenos Aires Province, Argentina; 7 November 1987) is an Argentine actor, singer and model. He is known for his starring roles in the television series Casi Ángeles, Supertorpe and Aliados. From 2016 to 2017, he starred in the telenovela, El Regreso de Lucas, playing Lucas Díaz Ayala/Pablo.

== Biography ==
=== First years and family ===
Pbs ablo Martínez was born on 7 November 1987 in La Plata. He completed his first years of studies at Lincoln College and then at the Rafael Hernández National College. Martinez was a tennis teacher, until he appeared at a casting of the production company Cris Morena Group.

=== Career ===
In 2008, he made his television debut playing the role of Simón Arrechavaleta in the juvenile series of Cris Morena, Casi Ángeles; that was issued in its four seasons by Telefe.

In the years 2011 and 2012, he played Felix Tarner – male protagonist – in the original Disney Channel series, Supertorpe, which was broadcast in its two seasons by the Disney Channel and Telefe, along with Candela Vetrano.

In 2013, Martínez was one of the protagonists of the series Aliados, which began broadcasting on the Telefe network on 26 June 2013 and on the 27th on the Fox network.

For the year 2014 was summoned to be part of the cast of Enrique Estevanez telenovela for Telefe, Camino al amor, where he played the third discord between the characters of Mariano Martínez and Eugenia "China" Suárez. In theater he plays in the musical work The Parka at the Teatro del Picadero.

In 2015 he participated in the program Tu cara me suena 3 where he hospital and fografas anstaret pugo snational and international singers. He left the program at Gala 9 because he was called to record a series in Peru, as his replacement was the actor and singer Matías Mayer.

Between 2016 and 2017, she starred in the Peruvian – Argentine production, El regreso de Lucas, along with the Colombian Ana Maria Orozco, where he played Lucas.

== Filmography ==
Year	Title	Format	Role	Notes
2008–2010	Casi Ángeles	TV series	Simón Rodríguez Arrechavaleta	
2008	Casi Ángeles	Stage	Simón Rodríguez Arrechavaleta	Adaptation of Casi Ángeles
2009	Casi Ángeles	Stage	Simón Rodríguez Arrechavaleta	Adaptation of Casi Ángeles
2011	Super Torpe	TV series	Felix Tarner	
2013	Aliados	TV & Virtual Series	Ian	
2014	Camino al Amor	TV	Polo	Antagonist
2016	El Regreso de Lucas	TV	Pablo	

== Discography ==
El Velo de Neptuno (2018)

A los Magos (2020)
