= Supertorpe =

- Genre: Comedy; Soap opera
- Created by: Tomás Yankelevich
- Directed by: Tomás Yankelevich
- Starring: Candela Vetrano; Pablo Martínez; Olivia Viggiano; Facundo Parolari; Chen Min; Lourdes Mansilla
- Country of origin: Argentina
- Original language: Spanish
- No. of seasons: 2
- No. of episodes: 52

Production
- Executive producer: Tomás Yankelevich
- Camera setup: Multi-camera

Original release
- Network: Telefe; Disney Channel Latin America
- Release: 23 August – 13 December 2011

Supertorpe (Spanish for"Superclumsy") is an Argentine series targeted at children and teenagers. The show is distributed worldwide by Disney Channel and Telefe Internacional, and locally by Telefe. Candela Vetrano and Pablo Martínez took starring roles.

== Plot ==
Poli Truper (Candela Vetrano) is a 16-year-old girl. She is a seemingly ordinary teenager but with a special gift: she is super powerful and equally clumsy. Poli has the misfortune of losing control of her powers whenever she gets nervous or gives vent to her feelings, which gets her in trouble constantly, especially at school.

She is actually "Super T", (Super Truper), but, being too clumsy, people call her "Super Clumsy" and it annoys her that people call her like that. Poli knows the possibilities that her powers could give her, but fails to dominate them. Thus, her clumsiness will unleash several disasters, as freezing all her school classmates wanting to stop time in a happy moment, getting caught on the wall with half body inside and half body outside when she tries to teleport from one room to another, or leave the school principal deaf for a few minutes when she sings a song with her super squeaky voice. Fortunately, her brother Filo – whose only super power is to be unbearably clever – is always responsible for covering the destructions that Poli produces with her bungling and avoid that her secret gift is discovered.

The only place where Poli feels in control of her powers is in her dreams, where not only she manages to master them to perfection but also makes it while wearing her glamorous superhero costume. In addition, in her dream world she sings as the gods and manages to conquer Felix (Pablo Martínez), her class companion whom which she's madly in love with. With the help of her brother, her best friend Mia and her Chinese nanny Chin Chan – who is, in fact, a professional trainer of superheroes – Poli will attempt to learn how to master her powers to become the superheroine that she is intended to be and fight against evil, as she muddles through the ups and downs of adolescence and the challenge of growing up.

== Characters ==
=== Main characters ===
==== Main ====
- Candela Vetrano as Poli Truper / Super T.
- Pablo Martinez as Felix Tarner
- Olivia Viggiano as Mia Nichols
- Facundo Parolari as Filo Truper
- Chen Min as Chin Chan

==== Side ====
- Lourdes Mansilla as Anita.
- Pía Uribelarrea as Miss Thorn.
- Fabian Pizzorno as Rafael Tarner.
- Adriana Salonia as Gloria Truper.
- Nicole Luis as Mora (starting from the second season).

==== Guest stars ====
- Sofía Reca as Michi (first season, episode: "The substitute").
- Rocío Igarzábal as Lucia (second season, episode: "mission impossible: singing").

== Episodes ==
| Season | Episodes | Originally aired (Latin America) | | Originally aired (Argentina Telefe) | | Originally aired (España) | |
| Season | Episodes | Season premiere | Season finale | Season premiere | Season finale | Season premiere | Season finale |
|---|---|---|---|---|---|---|---|
| 1 | 26 | 18 July 2011 | 23 August 2011 | 23 August 2011 | 5 October 2011 | 16 January 2012 | 28 February 2012 |

=== Season 1 ===
| No. overall | No. in season | Title | Latin air date | Telefe ais date | Spain |
|---|---|---|---|---|---|
| 1 | 1 | "Súper Secreto" | 18 July 2011 | 23 August 2011 | 16 January 2012 |
Poli is 16 years old and her powers are starting to appear, but there is a problem; she doesn't know how to control them. In addition, it all started when she falls for her new neighbor, Felix. Luckily her brother Filo knows that their father recorded a video with instructions, but Poli mistakenly recorded a few vocalization classes and ruined them. The only thing they were able to find out is that soon someone will be sent to help her.

== Súper Bonus ==
Segment dedicated to the backstage of the recordings and notes with the actors of the Strip. It intended that viewers could meet the players beyond their characters. This segment was the actor Stéfano de Gregorio as a driver.

== Videoclips ==
The 4 July 2011 during the segment of the "Zapping Zone" by Disney Channel, premiered the first videoclip for the song "for you", sung by Candela Vetrano.

19 August 2011 before the episode of "Supertorpe" by Disney Channel, was released the second video for the song "Look at me", sung by Candela Vetrano.

12 September 2011 after the episode of "Supertorpe" by Disney Channel, premiered the third music video of the song "Perfect day", sung by Pablo Martínez.

The 8 November 2011 after the episode of Supertorpe by Disney Channel, premiered the fourth music video of the song "Thank you", sung by Candela Vetrano.

== Awards and nominations ==
| Year | Award | Category | Nominated | Result |
|---|---|---|---|---|
| 2011 | Premios Martín Fierro | Mejor Serie Infantil/Juvenil | Supertorpe | Won |
| 2012 | Kids Choice Awards Argentina | Actriz Favorita | Candela Vetrano | ominada |

== International premieres ==
| Country / Region | Channel | Premiere | End of series | Title according to country |
|---|---|---|---|---|
| Argentina | Disney Channel Latin America | 23 August 2011 | 13 December 2011 | Supertorpe |
| Argentina | Telefe | 18 July 2011 | 28 September 2011 | Supertorpe |
| Bolivia | Disney Channel Latin America | 18 July 2011 | 28 September 2011 | Supertorpe |
| Chile | Disney Channel Latin America | 18 July 2011 | 28 September 2011 | Supertorpe |
| Colombia | Disney Channel Latin America | 18 July 2011 | 28 September 2011 | Supertorpe |
| Costa Rica | Disney Channel Latin America | 18 July 2011 | 28 September 2011 | Supertorpe |
| Dominican Republic | Disney Channel Latin America | 18 July 2011 | 28 September 2011 | Supertorpe |
| Ecuador | Disney Channel Latin America | 18 July 2011 | 28 September 2011 | Supertorpe |
| Panama | Disney Channel Latin America | 18 July 2011 | 28 September 2011 | Supertorpe |
| Guatemala | Disney Channel Latin America | 18 July 2011 | 28 September 2011 | Supertorpe |
| El Salvador | Disney Channel Latin America | 18 July 2011 | 28 September 2011 | Supertorpe |
| Honduras | Disney Channel Latin America | 18 July 2011 | 28 September 2011 | Supertorpe |
| Mexico | Disney Channel Latin America | 18 July 2011 | 28 September 2011 | Supertorpe |
| Nicaragua | Disney Channel Latin America | 18 July 2011 | 28 September 2011 | Supertorpe |
| Paraguay | Disney Channel Latin America | 18 July 2011 | 28 September 2011 | Supertorpe |
| Peru | Disney Channel Latin America | 18 July 2011 | 28 September 2011 | Supertorpe |
| Uruguay | Disney Channel Latin America | 18 July 2011 | 28 September 2011 | Supertorpe |
| Venezuela | Disney Channel Latin America | 18 July 2011 | 28 September 2011 | Supertorpe |
| Spain | Disney Channel Spain | 16 January 2012 | 13 March 2013 | Supertorpe |
| Italy | Disney Channel Italy | 15 April 2013 | 2013 | Supertorpe |
| Brazil | Disney Channel Brazil | 7 November 2011 | 10 January 2012 | Supet T |
