= Atracción x4 =

- Also known as: En Dream Beach
- Created by: Marcelo Tinelli
- Starring: Gabriel Goity; Carola Reyna; Luisana Lopilato; Camila Bordonaba; Juana Dubarry; Rodrigo Guirao Diaz; Darío Lopilato; Elías Viñoles
- Opening theme: Todo puede Cambiar; Atracción x4
- Country of origin: Argentina
- Original language: Spanish
- No. of seasons: 1
- No. of episodes: 110

Production
- Producers: Marcelo Tinelli and Ideas del Sur
- Running time: 60 minutes

Original release
- Network: Canal 13
- Release: November 3, 2008 – May 5, 2009

Atracción x4 is a 2008-2009 Argentine telenovela. It was broadcast on Canal 13. It replaced Patito Feo on Canal 13, at 7 pm. It was directed by Marcelo Tinelli, and produced by Ideas del Sur

Due to low ratings after the premiere, producers introduced new characters, sets and a new title. After the "makeover", the number of viewers who watched the show increased greatly, though it did not reach the success of its predecessor Patito Feo.

In March it began airing on the cable channel Boomerang.

== Plot ==
Hamlet Lacalle (Gabriel Goity) is the father of three girls: Nina Lacalle (Luisana Lopilato), Malena Lacalle (Camila Bordonaba) and Paula Lacalle (Juana Dubarry). The girls are in love with music. Leticia Gómez Valvuena (Carola Reyna) has married with Gonzalo Milhojas (Jorge Suárez) who has three sons: Francisco Milhojas (Rodrigo Guirao Díaz), Pablo Milhojas (Darío Lopilato) and Keto Milhojas (Elías Viñoles), and the three guys are in love with reggae. The girls and the guys meet each other because Nina works in the restaurant of Milhojas´family, and the boss in that place is Francisco. Paula and Pablo were in love when Pablo see the girls arriving the neighbourhood. Also, Malena mets Keto because Malena's cousin is the fan president of Atracción x4 (the band that boys form). Then they formed three couples. But, there are problems: the guys are very rich, and the girls are not. The father of three brothers doesn't want them to be friends with the girls. Also Gonzalo stole, a few years ago, a famous song, that it wrote for Hamlet, but Hamlet doesn't remember that. Leticia was Hamlet's teacher in school and now she is in love with him. The first season of "Atracción x4" is about the love of Francisco and Nina and how everyone moves about that. But the lower rating promoved that January 5, 2009 "Atracción x4" changes the history (Hamlet and Leticia lived together, Paula became in a bad person, Francisco and Nina are not in love, Leticia is the biologic mother of Francisco, Paula and Pablo are not in love, and Keto dates other girls but he is still Malena's boyfriend; and all live in a beach house-hotel).

== Cast ==
- Gabriel Goity as Hamlet Lacalle
- Jorge Suárez as Gonzalo Milhojas
- Carola Reyna as Leticia Gómez Valvuena
- Luisana Lopilato as Nina Lacalle †
- Camila Bordonaba as Malena Lacalle
- Juana Dubarry as Paula Lacalle †
- Rodrigo Guirao Díaz as Francisco Milhojas †
- Elías Viñoles as Keto Milhojas
- Darío Lopilato as Pablo Milhojas

== Band ==
Atracción x4 is the band formed by the three brothers Milhojas. "Patota Tropical" is the band of Hamlet; and "Las Latinas" is the band formed by the three sisters Lacalle. Also Camila Bordonaba won't be able to sing in the band till the end of 2008, because of her contract with Cris Morena.

=== Soundtrack album ===
The soundtrack album of Atracción x4 was released on December 3, 2008. It includes 13 songs.

1. "Todo Puede Cambiar"
2. "La mujer De Mi Padre"
3. "¿Por Qué Será?"
4. "Desde Que Te Vi"
5. "Súper Chica Súper"
6. "Este Dolor No Es Mío"
7. "Arriba Latinas"
8. "Ella"
9. "Este Dolor No Es Mío (Balada)"
10. "Sólo Sueños"
11. "Te Extraño"
12. "¿Por Qué Será?" (Versión Remix)
13. "Este Dolor No Es Mío" (Versión TV)

== Trivia ==
- Camila Bordonaba and Luisana Lopilato acted together in tres telenovelas - Chiquititas (1998-2001 (Bordonaba acted since 1996)), Rebelde Way (2002–2003), and "Atraccion x4" (2008-2009), and in two films - Chiquititas: Rincón de Luz (2001) and Erreway: 4 Caminos (2004), and they were both the members of the teenage sensation band Erreway.
- Luisana Lopilato and Darío Lopilato also played sister and brother in Casados con Hijos.
- Juana Dubarry was the last cast.
