= Candela Vetrano =

Argentine actress, model and fashion designer

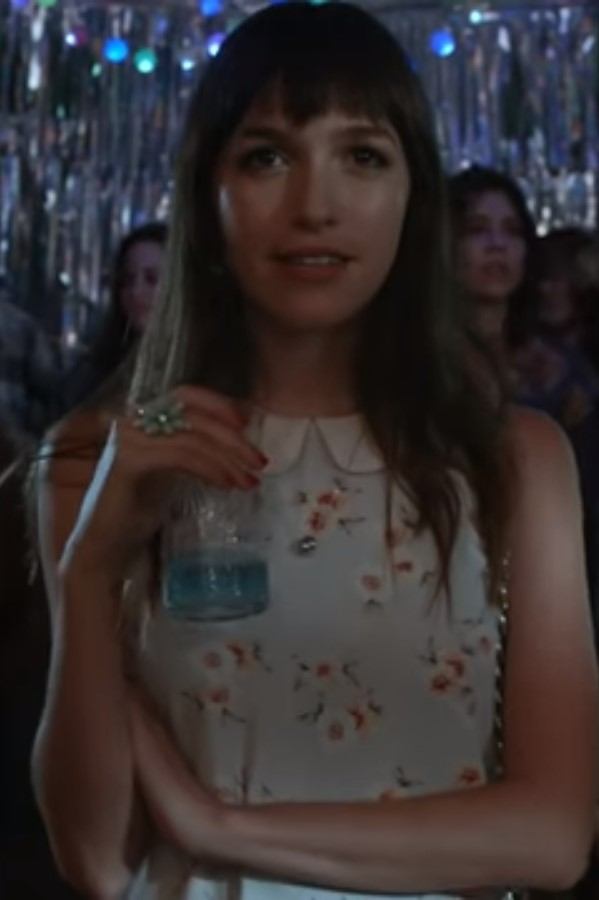
- Candela Vetrano on the shortfilm Claramente in 2017.
- Born: María Candela Vetrano Vega; August 9, 1991 (age 34); Lomas de Zamora, Buenos Aires, Argentina
- Other name: Candela Vetrano
- Occupations: Actress; Model; Fashion Designer
- Years active: 1998-present
- Partner: Andrés Gil (2015-present)
- Children: 1
- Parent(s): Héctor Vetrano and María Victoria Vega
- Modeling information
- Height: 1.60 m (5 ft 3 in)
- Hair color: Brown
- Eye color: Brown
- Website: candelavetrano.com/es

María Candela Vetrano Vega (born August 9, 1991, in Lomas de Zamora, Buenos Aires, Argentina) better known as Candela Vetrano is an Argentine actress, model and fashion designer.

== Biography ==
María Candela Vetrano was born on August 9, 1991, in Lomas de Zamora, Buenos Aires, Argentina. She is the daughter of Héctor Vetrano and María Victoria Vega. She has one brother and two twin sisters.

== Career ==
Candela Vetrano began her artistic career from a young age, performing studies of singing, theater, musical comedy and dance, being Agrandadytos her first participation in television. In 2003, she made her acting debut playing Estrella in the series Rincón de luz. In 2006, she was part of the cast of the youth television series Chiquititas Sin Fin, playing the character of Valeria San Simón. From 2007 to 2010, she was part of the cast of the youth television series Casi Ángeles, Candela Vetrano played the co-starring role of Estefanía Elordi Rinaldi. Candela Vetrano was the protagonist of the co-production between Disney Channel Latin America and Utopia, who work in collaboration with Telefe for the series Supertorpe which it was recorded since the beginning of 2011 and it was premiered on July 18, 2011. Candela Vetrano played the role of "Poly Truper". The series ended after 2 seasons in May 2012. In January 2013, Candela Vetrano is summoned by the producer Sebastián Ortega to be the youth protagonist of a new television fiction called Los Vecinos en Guerra. In 2014 to 2015, Candela Vetrano played the role of Milagros "Mili" Villa in the Pol-ka series Noche y día by Canal 13. In 2017 she is part of the cast of Cuéntame cómo pasó by TV Pública. In 2019, she was part of the cast of the television series Argentina, tierra de amor y venganza.

== Other work ==
In 2002 Candela Vetrano began her career as a model for Mimo & Co. In January 2013, Candela Vetrano launched her own clothing line, which she called Hey! Mona and that is directed towards teenage girls. Its main sales mechanism is online, through its website.

== Personal life ==
From 2008 to 2010, Vetrano was in a relationship with the actor Agustín Sierra. She then dated Lucas Minuto from 2011 to 2012, and actor Gastón Soffritti from 2013 to 2014.

Since 2015, she has been in a relationship with actor Andrés Gil. In June 2024, Vetrano announced that she was pregnant with the couple's first chid. On November 14, 2024, she gave birth to the couple's first child, a boy, whom they called Pino Gil Vetrano.

== Filmography ==
=== Television ===
Year	Title	Character	Channel	Notes
2003	Rincón de luz	Estrella Decervantes	Canal 9 / América TV	
2004	Floricienta	Guillermina Ponce	Canal 13	
2005	Amor mío	Milagros "Milli" Ortiz	Telefe	
2006	Chiquititas Sin Fin	Valeria San Simón	Telefe	
2007-2010	Casi Ángeles	Estefanía "Tefi" Elordi Rinaldi	Telefe	
2011-2012	Supertorpe	Poli "Super Torpe" Truper	Disney Channel / Telefe	
2012	Cuando toca la campana	Super Torpe	Disney Channel	
2013-2014	Los Vecinos en Guerra	Paloma Crespo Maidana	Telefe	
2014-2015	Noche y día	Milagros "Mili" Villa	Canal 13	
2015	Conflictos modernos	Luciana	Canal 9	"Episode 13: Una Novia Para Papá"
2016	Soy Ander	Kiki Vega	Boing TV	
2017	Cuéntame cómo pasó	Inés Martínez Pérez	TV Pública	
2019	Chueco en linea	Herself	Cablevisión Flow	
2019	Argentina, tierra de amor y venganza	Anna Moretti	Canal 13	
2020	Adentro	Laura	YouTube	
2020	Cartas a mi ex	Julieta	UNTREF	"Episode 7: Prefiero salir lastimado"
2020	Candente Online		Mona Multimedia	
2022	El fin del amor	Debi Tenenbaum	Amazon Prime Video	
2025	Menem	Victoria	Amazon Prime Video	
2026	Verdades sumergidas	Florencia	Telefe	

=== Theater ===
Year	Title	Character	Director	Theater
2003	Rincón de luz	Estrella Decervantes	Cris Morena	Teatro Gran Rex
2006	Chiquititas Sin Fin	Valeria San Simón	Cris Morena	Teatro Gran Rex
2007-2010	Casi Ángeles	Estefanía Elordi Rinaldi	Cris Morena	Teatro Gran Rex
2011-2012	Supertorpe	Super T		Teatro Ópera
2014	Criatura emocional		Fernando Dente	Teatro Multitabaris
2016	Separados			Teatro Multiescena
2016	Hiel		Mónica Bruni and Carla Petrillo	Theater cafe La Casona
2017	Mujeres perfectas		Manuel González Gil	Teatro Apolo
2018	Los martes orquídeas	Elenita	Francisco Mugica	Centro Cultural 25 de Mayo
2022	La verdad	Ana	Ciro Zorzoli	Teatro Politeama

=== Television Programs ===
Year	Program	Channel	Notes
2015	Tu cara me suena (Season 3)	Telefe	Participant
2016	Bailando 2016	Canal 13	Guest at the Salsa de a Tres de María Del Cerro
2019	Almorzando con Mirtha Legrand	Canal 13	Guest
2021	MasterChef Celebrity Argentina	Telefe	Participant
2024	Almorzando con Juana	Canal 13	Guest
2024	Noche al Dente	América TV	Guest

=== Movies ===
Year	Movie	Character	Director	Notes
2016	Claramente		Bárbara Borello Castillo	Short Film
2017	Hipersomnia	Malu	Gabriel Grieco	
2021	Esencial	Julia	"Who"	
2022	Impregnated	Belén	Gianfranco Quattrini	

== Discography ==
=== Soundtrack albums ===
- 2003 — Rincon de Luz
- 2006 — Chiquititas Vol. 8
- 2008 — Casi Ángeles
- 2009 — Casi Ángeles
- 2010 — Casi Ángeles
- 2011 — Supertorpe

== Awards and nominations ==
Year	Award	Category	Work	Result
2012	Kids' Choice Awards Argentina	Favorite Actress	Supertorpe	Nominated
2014	Kids' Choice Awards Argentina	Goddess	Herself	Nominated
