= Cris Morena =

Argentine musical artist and producer

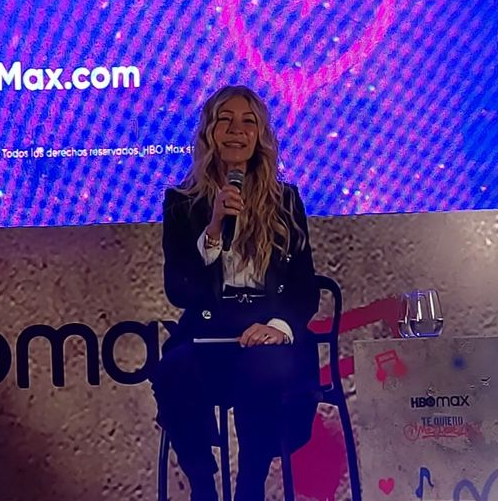
- Cris Morena in 2023.
- Born: María Cristina De Giacomi; 23 August 1956 (age 70); Buenos Aires, Argentina
- Occupations: Television producer, former actress, former television presenter, composer, musician, songwriter, writer, former fashion model
- Spouse: Gustavo Yankelevich (m. 1972; div. 1995)
- Children: Romina Yankelevich; Tomás Yankelevich
- Musical career

María Cristina De Giacomi (born 23 August 1956), professionally known as Cris Morena, is an Argentine Award-winning television producer, actress, television presenter, composer, musician, songwriter, writer, former fashion model and CEO of Cris Morena Group.

She is one of the most successful producers in the country and is the creator of Argentina's most successful youth-oriented shows such as Jugate Conmigo, Chiquititas, Rebelde Way, Floricienta, Alma Pirata, and Casi Ángeles. She was a producer at Telefe from 1991 to 2001, then created the Cris Morena Group as an independent production company, with Rebelde Way (2002) as its first production. Morena is the mother of actress Romina Yan and of producer and director Tomás Yankelevich.

After a long break from the industry, Cris Morena announced two new projects for streaming service Max: Te quiero y me duele (2023), inspired by a song for her deceased daughter, Romina and Margarita, a spin-off of Floricienta.

== Early life and career ==
Morena was born María Cristina De Giacomi in Buenos Aires, Argentina. She is the youngest of four siblings and grew up in Palermo, Buenos Aires neighborhood with her upper-class family. Her father was an engineer and her mother was a sociologist. She studied at a traditional private religious school. When she was 17, she started working as a fashion model and became the popular face for Lee Jeans in the country. While she was modeling, she also studied social assistance in university and militated alongside Padre Carlos Mugica during the dictatorship in Argentina.

When she was 17 years old, she was selected to host the youth-oriented show Voltop. While working on the program, she met Gustavo Yankelevich, which was part of the staff, and they fell in love. In 1974, Morena and Gustavo married and, after giving birth to Romina and Tomás, Morena decided to retire so she could fully dedicate herself to her family. After a few years, however, she returned to work when her husband was unable to find a job due to discriminating policies against Jews implemented by the Argentine dictatorship. She soon got a job at a telenovela called Dulce Fugitiva in 1979 playing Laura Moreno. Afterwards, she decided to adopt Laura's last name as her artistic name and became Cris Morena.

In 1980 Morena, who was already a pianist and wrote poems as a hobby, decided to start writing music. To this day she is one of the most successful songwriters in Argentina and the one who has made most money in copyrights and albums sales in SADAIC's history (Argentina's songwriters association) alongside her former songwriting partner Carlos Nilson (the two parted ways in 2007). In 1984, she was one of the stars of iconic comedy show Mesa de Noticias. From 1990 to 1991, she also had a starring role in Amigos son los Amigos. Morena retired as an actress after starring in the telenovela Quereme in 1994. In 1995, she also retired as a host and as a TV personality and became a full-time producer and songwriter. In a talk for TEA Imagen students, she revealed she believed her successful past in acting was due to her charisma, not her acting skills since, in her opinion, she was never a particularly good actress.

Until 1991, she was mostly known as an actress due to her role in iconic comedy shows such as Mesa de Noticias and Amigos son los Amigos and as a songwriter, thanks to the hits she wrote for children show host Flavia Palmiero alongside Carlos Nilson. In 1991, she made her debut as a powerful name in TV production when she created, presented and produced Jugate Conmigo. She went on to create the biggest youth-oriented franchises in Argentina history and her shows, such as Chiquititas, Rebelde Way and Floricienta, attracted huge ratings all over the world and spawned hundreds of products, albums and live concerts. Even though most of her shows were heavily panned by critics, most of them were huge commercial successes and had huge repercussion not only in Argentina but also in several other countries such as Brazil, Greece, Israel, Spain, Uruguay, Mexico and Chile.

In 1995, she retired as a TV personality when she ended her Jugate Conmigo series. Since then, she has worked behind-the-scenes, both as a TV producer and as songwriter. She is a well-known brand in Argentina, where she is considered one of the most powerful names in television. She is also a songwriter and music is an element in all of her shows. Her productions have accumulated over 30 platinum certifications and, alongside Carlos Nilson (her songwriting partner until 2006), she is the most profitable songwriter in SADAIC's (Argentine songwriters association) history.

A huge fan of Broadway musicals, Morena is also known for musicals with million dollar budgets based on her television production which are usually presented in Teatro Gran Rex in Buenos Aires. With the complete cast of the TV shows, those musicals break attendance records every Winter vacation (July in Argentina). Chiquititas alone has sold 1.5 million tickets. She was also responsible for the Argentine version of Spring Awakening in 2010 for which she was awarded several Premios ACE, the most prestigious theater award the country.

In 2010, after the sudden death of her daughter, Romina Yan, Morena went on a hiatus and closed her production company. She gave her last interview at the end of the year for Clarín and has made no public appearances. In November 2012, she made her comeback at the Grammy Latino red carpet and announced her return to television after two years, with Aliados. Aliados made its debut at the last week of June in Telefe.

=== Family ===
Morena married Gustavo Yankelevich in December 1974. Her husband became the producer of some of the biggest hits in the country, including Mesa de Noticias, and, in 1989, he became director of Telefe and, under his leadership, the channel became Argentina's most-watched TV channel. He was directly or indirectly responsible for some of Argentina's biggest television shows including Susana Giménez, Showmatch, among many others. He left the channel in 1999 and, in the following year, founded his own production company, RGB Entertainment. In 2002, so she could produce Rebelde Way, Morena also founded her own company, Cris Morena Group. From Floricienta in 2004 until Casi Angeles in 2010, RGB was a co-producer of all CMG ventures. Despite being associates and business partners, Morena and Gustavo have been divorced since 1996. Their two children, Romina Yan, who died in 2010, and Tomás Yankelevich, were both involved in show business.

Romina was an actress. She started her career as one of the co-hosts in Jugate Conmigo and became extremely popular playing Belén, the central figure in her mother's hugely successful children-oriented telenovela Chiquititas, in which she starred from '95 to '98. She also starred as Belén in the movie Chiquititas: Rincón de luz in 2001. With her mother, she did Jugate Conmigo (1991–1993), Chiquititas (1995–1998), Amor Mío (2005) and B&B: Bella y Bestia (2008). Both Amor Mio and B&B were also co-produced by her father which also chose her as host in Playhouse Disney (2001–2003) and as the lead in Abra tus Ojos (2003). She co-created Amor Mío, her biggest hit since Chiquititas, with her mother and the show was co-produced by her father and directed by Tomás, her brother.

Romina died from a sudden heart attack on 28 September 2010 when she was 36. She had three kids. As an honor to Gustavo Yanklevich's contribution to the channel, Telefe suspended all of its primetime shows on the day of her death to air a tribute to Romina. Marcelo Tinelli, host of Argentina's highest-rated show, also canceled his Showmatch show for the day in respect (Gustavo is Tinelli's mentor). Later, named his TV studio after Romina and also opened a pediatric hospital in her name. The day of her death, all four TV channels in Argentina suspended their primetime shows to air tributes and the news shows attracted the biggest audience of the year, with Telefe and Canal 13 reaching a combined 40 points of ratings during their primetime newscasts. After the shock of Romina's death, Morena announced a hiatus from TV production, closing down her production company for two years.

Tomás attended University of Southern California film school. He worked at both RGB and Cris Morena Group and, in 2011, opened his own production company, Utopia. He was the director of Bandana's feature film Vivir Intentando and directed several episodes of Amor Mío and B&B: Bella y Bestia. In 2011, he opened his own production company, Utopia, and filled the void left by his mother's hiatus with the kids-oriented fiction show, Supertorpe, which aired in Disney Channel Latin America and Telefe. Although Morena's involvement was kept to a minimum, the show starred Candela Vetrano and Pablo Martinez — both discovered by Morena — and she contributed songs to its soundtrack. Even though the show achieved some success — spawning a live musical and winning a Martin Fierro award — it could not reach the level of success achieved by his mother's shows and only lasted one season. Tomás also co-produced, alongside RGB, the Telefe primetime soap Cuando Me Sonreis starring Facundo Arana, Julieta Diaz and Morena's discoveries Benjamín Rojas and Lali Esposito. In February 2011, it was announced that Tomás would become the new Telefe director, a position held by his father from 1989 to 1999. As of 2013, Tomás is still in charge of the channel, helping Telefe to become once again the ratings' leader after losing the top spot for two years, in 2010 and 2011, to Canal 13.

Morena has five grandchildren: Valentín, Franco and Azul, from Romina's marriage with Darío Giordano; Inti and Mila, from Tomás marriage to Sofia Recca. Four characters in her new song, Aliados, are named after them.

== Composer ==
Although Morena is an extremely successful TV producer and businesswoman, she claims she is first and foremost a songwriter. Since the 1970s, she has composed for several of Argentina's and Latin America's biggest artists. She is the lyricist of almost every single song in her productions, totaling over 600 songs. Music is a huge part of her shows and soundtrack CDs being released yearly. Her productions garnered over 30 platinum records from Chiquititas, Verano del '98, Jugate Conmigo, Rebelde Way, Floricienta, Casi Ángeles, among others.

During the 1990s, Morena, alongside Nilson, was responsible for the music in most Telefe's shows, including Brigada Cola, Ritmo de la Noche, Videomatch, Cebollitas (97–98) and Dibu: Mi Família es un Dibujo and also for all Telefe's advertising campaigns and jingles. Before she started writing music for her own youth-oriented shows, she was, alongside Carlos "Rocky" Nilson, responsible for the music in Flavia Palmiero's children show. Morena and Nilson are the composers who made the most money in SADAIC's (Argentina's songwriters association) history. She and Carlos Nilson parted ways in 2007 when he went to work at Ideas del Sur.

During her hiatus as a TV producer, Morena continued writing songs. She contributed a few songs to Telefe's children show Supertorpe in 2011, for Teen Angels' fourth studio album and for Rebelde Way's Brazilian remake. Like she did in the 90s, Cris' has collaborated songs to Telefe's shows and campaigns since Tomás, her son, being named the channel's director. She composed the channel's official theme, Todos Juntos, and also contributed songs to Qitapenas, a musical comedy produced by the channel.

== Producer ==
=== Jugate Conmigo ===
After two important and memorable roles on television, Morena decided to give production a try. The result was Jugate Conmigo, which debuted in 1991 and was aired at weekdays during the 6 p.m. slot at Telefe. The show concept was a mix of game show and variety show targeted to teenagers. Morena was the main host and the rest of the cast consisted of a group of ten very know teenagers, five of each sex.

The show was taped in front of a live audience formed by tweens and teens. The main part of the show was the games with huge prizes that were played by the audience and the young cast members themselves. It also had sketches, musical segments and celebrity guests. The show also featured original music. Every year, a new CD was released with about 10 new songs sung by the cast. They sang about teen issues such as gossip, jealously, love, first sexual experiences, kisses and friends. All the songs were composed by Morena herself alongside her songwriting partner Carlos Nilson.

Soon after its debut, the show became a huge sensation and the teenagers who formed the cast became overnight teen idols. They held concerts at Estadio Obras in 1992 and at Teatro Gran Rex in 1994. The show also spawned four album, all of them certified Platinum. In 1992, Juntos, the second season album, was the 8th best-seller of the year. In both 1993 and 1994, Jugate Conmigo soundtracks were the best-selling albums in the country according to CAPIF, with Abrazadissimos and Rejugadisimos respectively.

Alongside the teens from the first two seasons of Jugate, Morena starred in the prime-time series Quereme. The show did not perform as well as the channel had hoped and was canceled. It was Morena's last venture as an actress. During the third season of Jugate, a segment of the show was dedicated to weekly telenovelas starring members of the cast. It was Cris' first steps towards producing fiction. Life College was a telenovela that aired inside the fourth season of Jugate Conmigo following teenagers living in an elite boarding school. The plot of the show was similar to Cris' future hit Rebelde Way (2002).

Given the program's impact and huge audience, both Cris and the network decided to revamp the format, transforming it into a family program from the fifth season onwards.Thus, it was renamed "Jugate con Todo", no longer being shown during the week, becoming weekly and moving to prime time on Sundays.The show would become the centerpiece of Telefe's Sunday schedule, replacing the extremely successful Marcelo Tinelli's Ritmo de la Noche. The show was co-hosted by Morena and Manuel Wirtz and was not well received, which prompted the show to change its time slot, co-host and its format which became increasingly similar to the original Jugate format. Jugate con Todo lasted only five months due a very low ratings.The last program aired on the eve of the premiere of Chiquititas, so part of the soap opera's cast was present during the recordings.

It was the first of many Cris-produced shows to be commercial successes but, at the same time, heavily panned by critics. At the time, she was criticized for acting like a teenager when she was over 30 years old. Even though the first version of the show was huge hit with the audience and sell millions of albums and merchandising, many critics declared the show was only aired because Morena was the wife of Telefe's CEO. Even though it was not praised by critics at the time, Jugate Conmigo is one of the most remembered shows of the early 1990s and the songs marked a generation. Jugate was also the TV debut for, among others, her daughter Romina Yan, Michel Brown and Luciano Castro.

=== Chiquititas ===
Chiquititas was a kids-oriented soap opera, aired weekdays at 6 p.m. from 1995 to 2000, and weekly in 2001. It is one of the most popular franchises ever in Argentina's television and was what consolidated Morena as a renowned and powerful producer. It was the first television franchise in the country and changed the way local shows were produced, sold and exported.

The show debuted in August 1995 at the same time slot as Jugate Conmigo was originally aired, Weekdays at 6 p.m. on Telefe. It started as a competitor to Canal 13's successful kids-oriented soap Amigovios and, in a few weeks, it was already a huge phenomenon and easily winning its timeslot. The novela focused on a girls' orphanage, Rincón de Luz (Corner of Light), localized in Buenos Aires and the girls' dramas, first loves, frustration of not having families among other issues. It borrowed elements from many children oriented movies and musicals, as Annie to The Sound of Music. The leading character and the children mentor was Belén, played by Cris' daughter Romina Yan. The illain for the first three seasons was Carmen Morán, a very cruel woman who was one of the owners of the orphanage. Belén's romantic partner changed each season as the storylines was more adult and tense: Gabriel Corrado played the part in the first season; Fernan Miras between 1996 and 1997 and, finally, in 1998, Facundo Arana, which went on to become Argentina's most popular TV actor.

The title of the show, Chiquititas (Tiny Girls; the official English title is Tiny Angels), referred to the fact the orphanage was originally made up of 10 girls. To increase the public, during the end of the second season, boys were introduced and, by the third season, the orphanage was changed to a unisex unity and boys and girls now teenagers shared the spotlight, with romance among the cast being one of the shows' biggest themes.

The third-season finale was shot on Walt Disney World and the main teenage character, Mili (Agustina Cherri), the central orphan, said goodbye to the show and the actress who portrayed her, Agustina Cherri, went on to star in Verano del '98, a teen soap also developed by Cris. Usually for each new season, a soundtrack album with about ten new songs was released. Exactly like Jugate a few years earlier, those albums were huge-sellers.The series used the MTV format, and which song had your own musical video and was aired inside the show, when the situation demanded. Many of the songs, such as "Pimpollo", "Rinconcito de Luz" and "Corazon con Agujeritos", became extremely popular and are still remembered all over Argentina, Uruguay and Brazil.

After a series of complaints and heavy criticism, lighter and more romantic stories were introduced, during the third season (1997). In a new plot, the Rincón de Luz original orphanage was closed and reopened on a new, even more picturesque house.At the fourth season (1998), the show got a new visual identity. Starring alongside Romina Yan was Facundo Arana who played her romantic partner. The fourth season was the highest rated season of Chiquititas during its seven-year run, and Arana went on to become Argentina's most popular leading actor and one of the biggest names in the country. The fourth season album was one of the best-selling albums in Sony Music Argentina's history. As Yan decided not to renew her contract at the end of 1998, this season was the last in which she starred. She, Arana and a large part of the young and old cast said goodbye to the cast and the first cycle of the plot was ended and during the fourth-season finale was the end of a cycle, with Bélen (Yan) and Alejo (Arana) adopting all kids. The final scene had the complete cast waving goodbye in the middle of the sea, boarding the iconic Fragata Libertad and singing the song En el Comienzo. Romina Yan and Facundo Arana reunited in 2001 to star in the movie version of the show.

In 1999, the show had a reebot and started with a new setting (now Rincón de Luz is closed and during the first season reborn in a farm, many years after the first cycle ended. Now, the action alternates between the 'farm' and a rich and big mansion placed at the side of the mannor) and a partial renovated cast.Some actors from previous seasons, as the main protagonists Camila Bordonaba, Benjamín Rojas, Santiago Stieben, Guillermo Santa Cruz and Nadia Di Cello continued in the show playing new characters. Grecia Colmenares played Ana, which replaced Bélen as the adult protagonist. Darío Grandinetti played her romantic interest Juan and Marcela Kloosterboer played Candela, one of the main character in the young cast. The link between the fifth season and the original Rincón de Luz orphanage was El Libro de la Vida (The Book of Life), a scrapbook made by Belen and the kids in the fourth season where they shared their story. This book was found by the new orphans at the beginning of the season and that's why, when Joaquin decides to give them a home, they decide to call the farm/orphanage Rincón de Luz, as an homage to the orphans that had their dreams come true.

At the season 5 finale, the farm big house is burned down by the villain and most kids manage to escape and, following a shooting star, end up at the now abandoned original Rincón de Luz orphanage (the one used in the third and fourth seasons but completely reformed inside). The return to the original setting was a response to dwindling ratings during the previous season. The sixth season stars Romina Gaetani as Luz. Gaetani, who was very unknown actress until the series started, feel the similarly to what happened to Facundo Arana, went on to become a very popular actress following her stint as the main actress in the sixth season of Chiquititas, as her first TV role.

The year of 2001 was a bittersweet end for Chiquititas fans. At one side, Argentina was going through the worst period of the economic crisis that hit the country in 1999 and the TV channels were also affected. Because of that, Telefé (which was not directed by Yankelevich anymore) decided to cut the budget for the show, a decision that was not well received by Morena. Since season 6 ended with a cliffhanger and the first few episodes were already shot, production resumed and the show became weekly. As a consequence, the number of episodes was severely shortened and the planned storylines, which were supposed to spawn for over 100 chapters, had to be rewritten in a very short period of time. In addition, because of disagreements between Morena and Claudio Vilarruel (Telefe's new director) the new season only saw the light in June, while it usually started in March (the beginning of fall in the Southern Hemisphere).

On the other hand, fans had more Chiquititas than ever before: besides the new episodes on Sundays, a retrospective of previous seasons was aired on the show traditional time slot (weekdays, 6 p.m.), a movie version starring Romina Yan and Facundo Arana (Romina was the main protagonist of the first three seasions) was released in July (winter vacations in Argentina), to end the show Agustina Cherri was back as Mili on the show and the usual musical was staged at Teatro Gran Rex from June to September, including a series of special sessions with Romina Yan reprising her role as Belén (as a tie-in for the movie, which starred her).

Since it was one of the most profitable shows on the channel, Telefe planned on continuing Chiquititas without Morena. A new season, which would be called Corazones en Banda, was announced. Even though castings were done and a few names were attached to the project, the channel ended up not greenlighting it.

Since music was such a huge part of the show and Morena is a huge admirer of Broadway musicals, it was decided Chiquititas would be transformed into a live musical in 1996. The musical broke attendance records in its first year and became a yearly event. Each season held during the July school holidays, a huge production with the entire cast was staged at Teatro Gran Rex in Buenos Aires. The theatral seasons were held between June and September and the scale of shows varied between 1 and 3 per day. Between 1996 and 2001, the show had a new script every season and was personally produced by Morena and they had budgets that normally exceeded US$1 million. Something that has never before been seen in Argentine showbiz industry. Usually during June a one show was presented, during the month of July, two shows were presented daily and they sold out so fast in 1998 a third daily concert, held at the mornings or a noon, had to be added to satisfy the demand. In fact, the 1998 series of concerts are until today the biggest public recorded at the venue. That year, the musical sold 280.000 tickets during 94 concerts. While the storylines for the live version of Chiquititas were extremely more simple than the television series and almost non-existent, the show was hugely impressive with its Broadway-like sets, wardrobes, high budgets and special effects. Most concerts were sold out and it was the top grossing live event in Argentina every year, from 96 to 2001.

Chiquititas was also heavily critically panned by media vehicles during all produced sessions. The content of the show was criticized for being questionable, hypocritical, overly sexual and for showing an orphanage full of beautiful blond kids in expensive and fashionist clothes. The songs were also criticized for being heavily commercial. Despite the lack of critical support, Chiquititas had seven seasons, one feature film, over 400 licensed products, five international remakes, two spin-offs and over 1 million tickets sold during its six seasons at Teatro Gran Rex in Buenos Aires. It was the first international franchise in Argentina's television history and is seen as a point of non-return in a local television. To this day, it still on air in Latin America on cable channel Boomerang.

=== Chiquititas around the world ===
In 1997, Brazil's number-2 net, SBT, made a deal with Telefe to produce its own version of Chiquititas. The show had an all-Brazilian cast but was shot in Buenos Aires, at the same studios where the original version was produced. Flavia Monteiro was cast as Carolina (Brazil's equivalent to Belen) and Fernanda Souza was Mili.

Unlike Argentina, where the plot took a while to settle in. In Brazil, from the first chapter the telenovela became an instant success. Since the beginning, the show became a huge sensation among kids and teenagers, becoming one of SBT's most popular shows. When the cast returned to Brazil to promote the soap, the cast caused a lot of confusion, leading the children to outbreaks of collective hysteria. As the plot progressed, there was a need to cast more child actors and the casting tests attracted amazing and gigantic numbers of subscribers and the albums sold in huge quantity (the first album sold over one million copies while the second album was less successful, selling over 850.000 copies). Like in Argentina, the show spawned a huge quantity of licensed products and was the debut of some of Brazil's most popular young actors including the siblings Kayky and Sthefany Brito and Bruno Gagliasso.

As it is an adaptation, several differences occurred mainly motivated by the available budget and also for cultural reasons. In the first phase, the number of characters in several centers was reduced and several story lines were cut. The number of girls at the young cast was reduced from 10 to 8 and the early entry of the male cast into the orphanage, which in Argentina took place in the middle of the second season. In 1998, the visual identity of the two versions was standardized and unified. While in Argentina the telenovela was in its fourth season, in Brazil the telenovela was passing through the transition between the first and second seasons. The length of the seasons was also different. The first season was aired in Brazil in 1997, the second was broken between 1997 and 1998 and the third and fourth were shortened, being merged and aired between the second half of 1998 and all year of 1999. In the Brazilian adaptation, several plots were cut or reallocated to other characters. Or new and exclusive plots were chosen that would serve as basis to the last two Argentine seasons. But the biggest difference was about the start of the fifth season, which aired in 1999 in Argentina and in 2000 in Brazil. As at the end of 1998, Romina Yan decided not to renew her contract with Telefé to dedicate herself to other more adult projects, the original version had to undergo a reboot and end the first cycle at the end of that season. And so, the so-called first cycle ended. However, this did not happen in Brazil, as Flávia Monteiro renewed her contract for another two years at the end of 1998.Due this, the producers of the plot decided that the Bélen/Carol would not end there and Raio de Luz could move for the third time and some and some characters would continue in the fifth season and the base of the structure of the history would be maintained. However, fully adapted and changed at the majority of the plots and for their maintenance, with Carolina and the young cast moving to a farm. Plus, the fifth season was the last one in Brazil, as the partnership between SBT and Telefé was not renewed, since the cost of the telenovela was practically all paid in US dollars, due the outsourcing of story production. Another thing was that Argentinian economy already showed signs that it would collapse in a short time. Meanwhile, to SBT save money chose to produce Brazilian versions of know Televisa productions, as the Mexican network made high investments on these adaptations to compete with Globo's primetime and also because the texts had already been adapted for some years and archived due the successive financial crises of the channel. But the main factor for the non-renewal of the contract is that the soap opera that was a profitable product for the channel began to lose audience and revenue during the previous season when most of the original characters had ended their plots. The idea of taking the production to Brazil was taken into account, because the story needed to be finished. January 2001. Thus, the sixth and seventh seasons were not adapted in Brazil. The original sixth season was aired in SBT in 2007, seven years after the series had ended and three years since the reruns (which aired for only a few months because of legal problems) and again attracted huge ratings.

The Mexican adaptation of Chiquititas was the center of a bidding war among Mexico's world know television, Televisa, and the recently created TV Azteca. The latter ended up winning the rights to produce the show and, like the Brazilian version, sent the Mexican cast to Buenos Aires to shoot the first season. But while in Brazil the show became a huge hit, it flopped in Mexico, partially because Televisa was, by far, the marketing leader and dominated children television in the country. Another change on the Mexican story was that the "Rincón de Luz" was a co-ed orphanage and the few child abuse plots were toned down or cut. Deals were also made with Antena 3 in Spain and with US producers, but the versions never materialized.

In 2000, Chiquititas became a massive hit in Israel. Again, a big merchandising was released, a musical with local actors was made with tickets selling out fast and several members of the cast (Nadia DiCello, Sebastian Francini, Camila Bordonaba, Felipe Colombo) visited the country to promote the show. The show was so huge in Israel, it motivated producer Yair Dori to approach Morena to co-produce a new Chiquititas season with her (due the legal troubles with Telefé, her createdRebelde Waywith the same cast, but in another television).

=== Verano del '98 ===
While Chiquititas was a massive hit among children and preteens, Telefe decided to create a show targeting teenagers to air alongside it. Gustavo Yankelevich was responsible for the initial plot and asked Morena to develop the show about a group of teens living in a small city called Puerto Esperanza. Cherri, who starred as Mili in Chiquititas, was chosen as the main actress and Patricia Maldonado, the screenwriter of Chiquititas, was in charge of the scripts. The show was intended to be aired exclusively during the summer (hence the title, translated as Summer of 98) but it was so successful it went on for three years (gaining the tagline Verano Eterno, Eternal Summer, later on). Morena and her staff were only in charge of the show during its first four months. However, Cris, alongside Carlos Nilson, was in charge of the music of the show for most of its run. The show spawned three albums of original music.

While Verano scored big numbers, being the leader among youth audience in the country, it provoked much controversy. First, it was accused of plagiarizing the American TV show Dawson's Creek although Verano premiered on Telefe a few days before Dawson made his debut on The WB in the U.S. Both shows had huge similarities and some storylines were identical in the first few months. The plagiarizing scandal was explained by Gustavo Yanklevich for La Nación newspaper. He confirmed Verano was hugely influenced by the American show and this happened because he went to a screening of the Dawson's Creek pilot months before the original airing, fell in love with it and because the show took so long to premier, he thought the drama was not picked up by the TV network. He thought the premise had much potential so he asked Morena and the production team to develop a teenage show with a similar story-line. Telefe and Sony (Dawson's Creek producer company) reached an amicable agreement when Sony was given the right to distribute Verano around the world.

The show also caused controversy because of its huge focus on sex with taboo themes like masturbation and plenty of sex scenes and sex talk involving the young teenagers. This issue was resolved by changing the time slot of the show: it was moved from its 7 p.m. slot (following kids soap Chiquititas) to 10 p.m., where it was still a big hit. It was the first teenage-oriented show to air in that time slot. For its third season, the show came back to its original time slot with no controversy. Verano spawned three multi-platinum albums and was the breakthrough of many respected and established actors including Florencia Bertotti, Nancy Duplaá, Marcela Kloosterboer, Nicolás Vázquez, Carla Peterson, Guido Kaczka, Juan Gil Navarro, Fernán Mirás, Mariano Torre, Florencia Peña, Dolores Fonzi, Tomás Fonzi and other. Plans for a Brazilian version of Verano were made but never materialized.

Morena and Chiquititas production team only worked in Verano until the middle of the first season. Then, Morena and her staff decided to focus solely on Chiquititas, which was in the midst of its most successful season, so her ex-husband and Telefe's director, Gustava Yanklevich, took charge. In an interview with Mario Pergolini (for his radio show Cual Es?), Morena revealed she did not like the direction Verano took after she left the production team. However, she owns the rights to the program and is listed as an executive producer for all its seasons.

In 2009, Pedro Damián, which was responsible for the Mexican versions of Rebelde Way and Floricienta, announced his next project for Televisa was a version of Verano which would be titled Verano de Amor and would star Dulce Maria and a big cast of new faces. The show finally debuted in February 2010 on the 7 p.m. time slot being co-produced by Cris Morena Group and RGB.

=== Rebelde Way ===
After disagreements between Morena and Vilarruel, Telefe's chairman, she started developing a new show about a group of rich teenagers living in an elite boarding school. The project became Rebelde Way. Felipe Colombo, Camila Bordonaba, Luisana Lopilato and Benjamin Rojas, who were highly popular during Chiquititas' last three seasons, were chosen as the four leads (Rebelde means literally rebel but it also means stubborn, different, daring, revolted, problematic).

Until the late 1990s, producing companies—now very common in the country—uncommon and most shows were property of the channel. Morena had no plans to open her own production company but, after parting ways with Telefe and with a huge team following her, it was the only legal way to do it. Cris Morena Group was born. However, the company was formed by creative staff and was not able to cope with the business and legal aspects by itself so she needed a partner to finance it. Initially, the show was to be co-produced alongside RGB Entertainment, Morena's ex-husband's company with whom she has a very amicable relationship. However, the association did not work out since she was looking for someone who could dedicate themselves entirely and RGB was busy managing girl group Bandana and Mambrú, which were directed at the same target group.

After offers from Canal 13 and Canal 9, the show almost was not produced since the channels, still suffering from the Argentina's economic crisis, could not finance it and she needed an associate who could finance the project. The production resumed when Argentine-Israeli producer Yair Dori decided to invest heavily on the show after Chiquititas became popular among children in Israel. The production began before the show had a confirmed channel to be aired on. It was decided the show would premiere on Canal 9, which had success with teen-oriented show Popstars the year before, and it would be aired every weekday at 8 p.m. Soon after its debut, the show became the channel's highest-rated show. It spawned a band, Erreway, formed by the four protagonists, several licensed products (such as stationery items, a clothing line, a monthly magazine, cosmetics and sunglasses) and a triple platinum album.

After the reception of the show's first series, Morena decided to produce a second season and the group started touring Argentina and selling out arenas around the country and in other South American countries such as Uruguay, Bolivia, Paraguay and Peru. In 2003, Argentina still had not recovered from the crisis and Canal 9 was having some big financial troubles and could not finance the show anymore. Because of that, the show changed from Canal 9 to America 2 in the middle of the second season alongside another CMG production, Rincón de Luz. The transition meant the show sets had to be rebuilt in a new studio and that the show would be off-air for one month. It was the first time in Argentine television history a show changed channel in the middle of the season.

Although Rebelde Way and Erreway were popular, they were initially outshone by girl group Bandana and boy band Mambrú, winners of the first and second season of reality show Popstars. Both bands were managed by Cris's ex-husband and his company, RGB Entertainment. For the first time in seven years, Morena did not have the opportunity to use Teatro Gran Rex during winter vacations since the venue was occupied by Bandana. In the year-end best-selling ranking, Erreway's Señales ranked as the third-best-seller of the year, following Bandana and Mambrú. However, Morena and Gustavo had an extremely amicable relationship: Morena directed Bandana's first series of Gran Rex concerts and Gustavo helped organize Erreway's first live show which would happen for free at Abasto shopping mall, repeating the successful Bandana's Abasto live debut in 2001. Besides, Mambrú and Bandana songs were owned by Mardi Grass Publishing, which is the music publishing company owned by Morena and Gustavo in association. Rebelde Way's first-season finale also featured a highly promoted cameo by Bandana.

Following the tradition, critics from Argentina's main newspapers were not exactly supportive of the program. Clarin criticized the four main characters. According to the paper, "they look and act like they're 12 years old. They're not in Chiquititas anymore. They have biceps and new "older" looks. And yet they still act like they're in elementary school". In another review, it noted "the show sometimes look like soft porn and sometimes like a parody due to its absurd setting and the painful over-acting", although it admitted the show was undoubtedly successful, concluding that "four months after its debut, the show already spawned a double platinum album, a music video that airs nonstop on music cable channels, a monthly magazine, cosmetics, a sunglasses and clothing line, stationery items and very good sales for the international market". In a review of the live concert at Teatro Gran Rex, Clarin described the cast wardrobe as "mini-skirts, leather, knee-high socks, rhinestones. What Cris Morena would love to still be able to pull off".

The newspaper La Nación was less critical and even gave the show a positive nod. They rated the show as "Good" and, although it criticized the characters for being excessively stereotyped, it concludes the stereotypes are made acceptable because the telenovela distances itself from any realistic tone. It also commented that "you could find everything in the show. From very good young actors, such as Camila Bordonaba to terrible ones, such as Coco Maggio. There are some extremely well-done sequences while others look cheap". It concluded that the biggest attractions for teenagers were the glamorous setting and the fun music and that the dialogues were fun and reflected the way teenager really talked.

However, it was not only critics that were not too fond of the show. Church organization and even the Argentine Camara de Anunciantes (Chamber of Advertisers), a self-regulated group formed by huge ad executives in the country, protested the show. In 2002, Morena was interviewed for the TV show Horizontal/Vertical to promote Rebelde Way. Carlos Polimenni, a journalist and panelist on the program, attacked her, arguing her TV shows were "crap" and "too commercial". Morena, visibly upset, replied: "You're such an idiot. You pretend to be a serious journalist while being a panelist in a gossip show". In 2003, Morena fired back at critics, saying: "Critics are increasingly distant of the general public opinion. They are so out of touch with reality they remind me of politics. And politics are not exactly doing well at their jobs right now, are they?". She continued: "Some people say my programs are too commercial. What's wrong with that? The ideal recipe in television is to do a show that's well done and successful. It does not makes any sense to do a show or a musical or an art exhibition for a minimal audience. What I want to do is to get to biggest number of people I can in the best way possible".

While Rebelde Way and the spawned band Erreway were popular in Argentina, they achieved even more in Israel, where the show benefited from the hype surrounding Chiquititas. Rebelde Way soon became the most-watched show among children and teenagers in the country, the group was contracted by several companies, from McDonald's to Swatch, to promote their products and their concerts in Tel Aviv were attended by over 100,000 people. Hysteria was so big that they were headlines of the country's biggest and most important newspaper on the day of their arrival in the country. A phenomenon so big was never before seen in Israel and even though several kids and teenage-oriented shows of the same vein were aired later in the country, most of them coming from Argentina, never a show came close to the mass hysteria Rebelde Way caused among Israeli youth. Argentina is still instantaneously connected with this show by Israeli natives and both the Mexican and the Brazilian versions were also aired.

Yair Dori wanted to extend Rebelde Way for a third season but, due to Cris' refusal, was unable to. Yair tried to recreate the success with El Refugio de los Sueños, which had most of Rebelde's cast, but the show was a failure in Argentina and Israel. After Rebelde Way, Morena's partnership with Yair Dori did not go for too long. From Floricienta on, RGB Entertainment became her business associate.

In 2004, Erreway, the band, did their last projects together: the movie Erreway: Cuatro Caminos, which was released in theaters, the album Memoria and their goodbye tour. Three years after the end of the band and four years after the TV show, Rebelde Way started airing in Spain and soon became a success. With the defunct band appearing in several magazine covers and moving thousands of merchandising and albums, they decided to reunite for a Spanish arena tour. The tour caused mass polemic when it was announced Luisana would not be touring with them and had left the band. This announcement was made when tickets were already on sale and her image and name appeared on the promotional material. Even with the Luisana controversy, the tour was successful, with all shows selling out, and the three remaining members reunited to do a new album especially for the Spanish market where a new tour was also planned. While the album, titled Vuelvo, was recorded, legal problems with Pol-ka, which produced Son de Fierro (with Felipe and Camila on the cast), caused the new studio album and the tour to be canceled. The new material recorded by the band was used in Atr@pados, a soap made for cellphones and the Internet which starred Benjamin Rojas and Felipe Colombo, the male half of Erreway. Atrap@dos was shot in 2009 but the project was never officially released, airing as shorts on Yups.TV in 2012.

A number of copycat shows with the same format and with a big chunk of the original secondary cast were aired on Argentinian television, many of them co-produced by Yair Dori, who was still trying to recreate Rebelde Way's momentum (especially in the Israeli market). Those shows included El Refugio de los Sueños (aired in Canal 13 against Chiquititas in 2006), Frecuencia '04 (aired on Telefe in 2004 against Floricienta), Paraiso Rock (aired in Canal 9 in 2005) and Romeo y Julieta (aired in Canal 9 in 2007). Those were all commercial failures in both Argentina and Israel and were canceled. Morena had no relation to those productions.

=== Rebelde Way foreign versions ===
In 2004, Star One bought the rights to adapt the show for India and REMIX was a huge success and caused a big impact among the local youth.

In 2004, Mexico's Televisa debuted their own version of the show, Rebelde. The soap was, once again, a huge phenomenon among Latin-American crowd and the group that spawned from the show, RBD sold out Latin America's biggest stadiums and were the first group to receive a Diamond Record for sales in Mexico since OV7 in 2000. They achieved record sales in Colombia (were they outsold Shakira and Juanes), Brazil, Spain and Chile and in almost every Latin-American country.

In Brazil, where Hispanic pop is unpopular, RBD sold over 2.5 million records. Their first concert in the country, which was free, was marked by tragedy when a much bigger crowd than expected turned out and a stampede killed two young fans. Later, they were the first Spanish language acts to do a concert at the world's biggest stadium, Maracanã, in Rio de Janeiro.

Ironically, one of the few markets in which Rebelde did not perform well was Argentina, where it only debuted in 2008, two years after their peak (because of contractual obligations with Cris Morena Group and Dori Media). They still managed to achieve a Golden record for sales with their album, Empezar Desde Cero according to CAPIF and their first concert in Buenos Aires (part of their goodbye tour) sold-out. Morena was in attendance at the concert.

At the end of August, a Portuguese adaptation of the show premiered on SIC. It also had remakes in Brazil, by Record and Chile, by Mega. In both countries, Brazil and Chile, the Mexican version aired with huge success. In Chile, the Argentinean version was also broadcast.

In 2009, it was revealed Fox and Jennifer Lopez's production company had the rights for the American remake.

=== Floricienta ===
When many doubted Morena could exceed her previous hits, she surprised again with Floricienta. A modern retelling of Cinderella (the title was a mix of Flor, the main character nickname, and Cenicienta, Spanish for Cinderella), the story was developed by Morena as a starring-vehicle for Florencia Bertotti.

After being panned by critics since 1991 with Jugate, Morena finally received praise. Clarin, in their first positive nod of one of her productions, rated the show as "very good" and noted that "[w]hat Cris Morena declared is true: Floricienta is not much better than all her other children and teen-oriented sagas that were previously on (Chiquititas, Verano del '98, Rebelde Way, Rincón de Luz). However, being only a tiny bit better, it conquered not only the public but also the very mischievous public opinion (and while both may look the same, they're definitely not)". The critic praised the actors, especially Florencia Bertotti, the editing, the story, the scripts and the pace of the show. However, Clarin and Canal 13, which originally aired Floricienta, are owned by the same parent company. La Nación, which has always been more positive when it comes to Cris' shows, also rated the show as "very good" praising the production, the cast and Florencia Bertotti's charisma and comedy timing.

Floricienta started with 14 points in its first episode and, by its season finale, achieved ratings of over 30 points with the death of Federico, being the biggest Morena produced hit in history, even topping Chiquititas 98 ratings. The first season was the highest-rated afternoon-slot show in Canal 13 history. Although the ending of the first season, with the death of the prince Federico, was highly criticized, the second season continued to be hugely popular. The TV show ended with Floricienta getting married in front of a big live audience and the finale was also a hit, with 25 points.

Floricienta, as with most Cris Morena Group productions, had a huge Broadway-style live musical in Teatro Gran Rex during the Winter Vacations. Demand for tickets were extremely high with some concerts selling out in minutes. To satisfy the demand, the cast played two end of the year concerts at Estádio Velez Sarsifield with over 40.000 tickets sold for each of the two performances. In 2005, a new musical debuted on Gran Rex and it was also a major success with a total of 170,000 tickets sold. Because of this, eight extra shows were played in Luna Park stadium in Buenos Aires with 80,000 tickets sold. After the show ended, the complete cast waved goodbye in front of 40.000 people at another sold-out concert at Vélez Sársfield stadium. With over 290.000 tickets sold, it broke attendance records for a Morena musical in Buenos Aires (however, it did not break the Teatro Gran Rex attendance record, still held by the 280.000 tickets sold by Chiquititas in the '98 season).

Floricienta spawned over 300 licensed merchandising, from toys to Floricienta-branded apples. Merchandising stands selling the show products were set up at Shopping Abasto and Unicenter. The albums were also hugely successful, with the first album being the third best-selling album in 2004 and the 10th best-selling album in 2005 (and, after achieving four times platinum, becoming the best-selling Cris' album since Chiquititas 1998). The second season soundtrack was the top-seller in 2005.

Floricienta was also a huge phenomenon in most of Latin America where it was aired by broadcast television and also at the Disney Channel, where it was as popular as the American shows such as Hannah Montana. While Rebelde was arguably Cris' biggest hit in Latin America, Floricienta was the first original CMG production to achieve such widespread success in its original format (since Rebelde was a remake by Televisa, co-produced with CMG). The cast sold out huge stadiums all over Latin America, including Mexico, where no Argentine TV show had ever achieved such a huge success (even though the show had only aired on cable). Over 1 million people attended Floricienta tour in Argentina, Mexico, Venezuela, Dominican Republic, Israel, Guatemala, Peru, Bolivia, Uruguay among many other territories.Floricienta, alongside Rebelde, was the biggest youth-oriented show in Latin America in 2004–2005 being aired in every single country and selling out stadiums in Central America, South America and North America. During those years, Morena dominated youth-oriented TV not only in her home country but in the entire continent.

In 2004, a Brazilian version was produced, named Floribella. It doubled the ratings of Bandeirante at its time slot, over 40 products were released and the two CDs achieved platinum certifications. In 2005, a Portuguese version was also aired at SIC and was a massive hit. The first CD released is the best-selling CD ever in Portugal and over 150 products were released at the country. Because of the massive success of the show, SIC bought the rights to other three Cris Morena Group shows: Alma Pirata, Rebelde Way and Chiquititas. A version from Chile (also called Floribella) was also produced with great acceptance and the Mexican version (Lola...Érase una vez) also did well. There was also a Colombian version and the rights were bought for Greece, Russia, among other countries. In an interview with Radio 10 in February 2009, Morena revealed Disney had bought the rights for an American remake.

Floricienta was the subject of a legal battle between Morena and Florencia Bertotti when Morena accused Niní—the grand return of Bertotti to television after four years—of plagiarism. The judge ruled in favor of Cris Morena Group but the two parts reached an amicable agreement which permitted the show to continue being aired in Telefe and the musical to tour across the country. Nini was starred and produced by Florencia and it had much of the same production team as Floricienta, including its scriptwriter Gabriela Fiore.

In March 2012, Floricienta—originally aired at Canal 13—started being rerun during Telefe's afternoon, increasing the slot's average and, despite being a rerun, beating Canal 13's Los Unicos second season, which targeted a similar young audience. Due to high ratings, the running time was extended from 60 minutes to two hours, airing from 6 p.m. to 8 p.m. It was the second time the show was repeated: it also re-aired in its original channel, Canal 13, in 2008 also achieving very satisfactory numbers.

=== Chiquititas' spin-offs ===
After exiting Telefe in 2001 due to disagreements with then content director Claudio Vilarruel, Morena had to leave the Chiquititas brand behind since the name was property of the channel. Decided to make a new season, Morena created a spin-off, Rincón de Luz (the name of the orphanage throughout all its seven seasons), to be aired in Canal 9 alongside the second season of Rebelde Way. Similarly to Rebelde, the show was co-produced by Israeli production compani Dori Media.

Guido Kaczka, which played Belen's brother from 95 to 98 in Chiquititas and Argentina's best-selling singer, Soledad Pastorutti were chosen as the leads. Many of the young actors from previous Chiquititas season, such as Agustín Sierra, Natalia Melcon and Nadia Di Cello were also part of the cast. And new young actors and actresses like Lali Espósito, Candela Vetrano, Eugenia Suárez, Stéfano de Gregorio, Camila Salazar and Gastón Soffritti were also introduced.

The show debuted in April 2003. Although it rated better than Canal 9's average numbers, it could not top the success of the previous Chiquititas seasons and ratings were also lower than Rebelde Way. In the middle of the year, due to a crisis in Canal 9, the show changed to America 2 alongside Rebelde Way and the one-month hiatus and frequent time slot changes in the new channel affected the show greatly. Even so, it still rated better than the channel's average. Even though ratings were not as big as hoped, commercially the show was still a success, being sold to over 30 countries. The soundtrack album achieved Gold certification (a modest result compared to other Chiquititas' albums). Although it underperformed in Argentina, in Israel the show was a huge success, helped by hype surrounding Rebelde Way and the original Chiquititas, which had exploded there only a few years prior. The complete cast of the program visited Tel Aviv for a series of concerts at the Nokia Arena, with over 50.000 tickets sold.

In 2005, Morena started to patch things up with Telefe when her sitcom Amor Mío was picked up by the channel and aired on primetime with great success. Finally, after four years working for all its competitors, Morena returned to Telefe in an exclusivity deal in 2006. She would produce a prime-time show and a children-oriented show for her traditional 6 p.m. slot.

For the comeback, Morena decided to produce a new season of Chiquititas. Jorgelina Aruzzi was chosen as the central figure, Lili. Jorgelina was revealed at Amor Mío. Her romantic interest was Kili, played by Gaston Ricaud. The children cast was formed by new faces fresh out of a casting and Lali Espósito (which had starring roles in Rincón de Luz and Floricienta), Stéfano de Gregorio (who had starring roles in Rincón de Luz and Floricienta) and Candela Vetrano (who had a starring role in Rincón de Luz). However, even though the album achieved double platinum, spawned over 100 licensed product and was the ratings leader on its time slot, beating Canal 13 rival show El Refugio (de los Sueños) (which was eventually canceled), it did not matched the phenomenal level of popularity of the previous seasons, Floricienta or even Rebelde Way.

The licensed products did not sell as much and while Floricienta second album was the best-selling album of 2005, Chiquitita's album was only the 6th best-selling CD in the following year. The high-budget Gran Rex musical did not sold out as fast and it lost out to Disney On Ice as the top-selling even of that year It sold 75.000 tickets, a huge number and the second biggest event of 2006, but it could not come close to the 250.000 tickets moved by Floricienta the previous year.

Following the tradition of previous seasons, the new Chiquititas was panned by critics. Clarín commented the acting was solid but the story-line was weak and La Nación, which gave good reviews for Rebelde Way, Floricienta and even some of Chiquititas original seasons, only gave the show a "regular" rating and criticized the weak scripts and dialogues.

Even though the show did not surpass Floricienta, it was still profitable enough for a second season to go under production. It was, after all, Telefe best-selling exportation product of 2006, and a commercial success. Adaptations were made in Portugal and Rumania. For the second season, the show would still be under the Chiquititas brand but with a whole new cast and storyline. Emilia Attias and Nicolas Vasquez were chosen as the leads while Alejo Garcia Pinto and Julia Calvo, both highly respected theater actors, would also be part of the cast. Finally, plans for the show to be a new season of Chiquititas were scrapped and the project was renamed and redeveloped as Casi Ángeles.

The 2007 season of Chiquititas revealed actors like Pedro Lanzani, Guadalupe Anton, Eva Quatrocci and Gastón Soffritti. It also marked the last time Morena worked with her songwriting partner, Carlos "Rocky" Nilson. "Rocky" Nilson went on to work at Ideas del Sur, doing the soundtrack for Patito Feo, Atraccion x 4 and Malcriados. The soundtrack album for Chiquititas was mostly reworked versions of popular songs from previous seasons of Chiquititas, all of them from the 1995–1998 years. The exception were the theme song, which was a reworked version of the original Jugate Conmigo theme from 1991, and Dondes Estas?, the sole brand new track.

In 2008, SIC aired a Portuguese remake following Floribella's huge success. After struggling on prime-time, the show changed time slot and the audience increased drastically. Many licensed products were released and the CD also did well in sales. A video game for the Wii console was also released. Romania also bought the rights and produced their own local version.

Brazilian-net SBT perceived there was still appetite for Chiquititas franchise after the huge ratings the reruns of the original soap achieved in 2004 and bought the rights for the 6th season, being the first Argentina's soap aired (in its original format, not remake) in the country since Manchete's aired Mas Alla del Horizonte in 1995. In 2007, the 6th season started airing and it increased rating at its time slot. Stamp albums, dolls, a CD and other products were released. In 2008, Chiquititas '06 also aired.

=== Casi Ángeles ===
Initially, Morena planned to do the eighth season of Chiquititas with an all-new cast but, at the last minute, she decided to rename and restructured the whole project. Morena revealed for the first time the title of the show, Casi Ángeles, in a November 2006 interview to Produ.com. Production started in December and, in March, the show made its debut at Telefe, in her traditional 6 p.m. timeslot. Targeted to kids and teens, the show starred Emilia Attias and Nicolás Vázquez and, as the Teen Angels, the band spawned from the show, Lali Espósito, Peter Lanzani, Eugenia Suárez, Nicolás Riera and Gastón Dalmau. Gimena Accardi, Alejo García Pintos and Julia Calvo completed the main ensemble.

Casi Ángeles made a good impression in the specialized press. La Nación rated the show as good and praised the production and the chemistry between the main couple. Fans were not so positive: in boards like Los Ángeles de Cris and Telenovelas.com.ar, fans praised the production but complained the show lacked originality, with Cielo (played by Emilia Attias) resembling Floricienta and with many plots being reused and resembling those from the eight previous Chiquititas seasons, Alma Pirata, Rebelde Way and mostly Floricienta, with scenes that were exactly the same as the previous Morena show.

The show debuted with 13.7 points, on par with previous Morena shows and leading its timeslot. However, it began struggling when Patito Feo made its debut on Canal 13. The Ideas del Sur production was a huge smash and, for the first time, Morena did not have the leading children project for children in the country. Patito Feo products were also outselling Casi Ángeles and, in April, Patito was winning with a vantage of over 2 points in rating, forcing the show to change its timeslot to 5:30 p.m. After the change, Casi Ángeles started to considerably increase its ratings and returned to its original slot, facing Patito once again. This time, ratings were more stable and the show achieved its biggest numbers with the season finale which achieved 16 points, easily beating the competitor. At the end of the year, both shows had similar numbers: Patito Feo averaged 12.6 points while Casi Ángeles averaged 12 points. Commercially, the show was still a success with over 50 licensed products and a Platinum-selling album. The musical at Teatro Gran Rex attracted over 140,000 people. Even so, commercially, managed to overshadow the "Patito Feo" tour across the country, either by the volume of tickets sold, or by the sexual harassment scandal that would come to light some time later.

In January, Casi Ángeles second season went into production and the show made its debut in April. To present the new season, a free, special an exclusive concert was held at Luna Park stadium for 8.000 ticket holders. The new songs were presented for the first time and a 10-minutes trailer was shown. The second season had an innovative format – including monologues, episodes titles and other production recourses not usually used in daily fiction shows – and a bigger focus on the teenager cast. It had a 13.6 average, a 2-point increase from its previous season. It also easily beat all its competitors: after winning the battle in the previous years, Patito ratings plunged on its second season and Morena's show ended with a vantage of over 4 points in average ratings (Patito averaged 9.4 points in its second season). In November, after Patito Feo finale, Ideas del Sur debuted its new teen oriented show, Atracción x 4 (with the highly promoted reunion of Rebelde Way's Luisana Lopilato and Camila Bordonaba) at the 7 p.m. slot as to avoid a clash with Casi Ángeles. However, Telefe changed the show's slot to 7 p.m. and Casi Ángeles beat the new Ideas del Sur show. To extend Casi Ángeles second season—which already had wrapped its production—Telefe decided to turn the final 6 chapters into 12 (cutting each chapter in half and extending the Teen Angels segment at the end of each episode) so the show would air for an extra two weeks. The season finale was aired in the original 60-minute format and reached 18.4 points, a series' high and the highest-number achieved on an afternoon slot during the year. The second season musical, held, as usual, in Teatro Gran Rex from June to September, became the second biggest Gran Rex ticket-seller ever (behind only Chiquititas '98) selling 220.000 tickets. In October, the cast went on a national tour and, in December, to satisfy the demand, they played six additional concerts at Gran Rex in Buenos Aires.

After a three-week vacation, the cast resumed their tour with two sold-out concerts in Mar del Plata. The Teen Angels were also chosen as the spokespeople for Coca-Cola in Argentina, singing Coke's 2009 summer anthem "Hoy Quiero" and opening a Coca-Cola stand in Pinamar in front of 5,000 fans. At the start of March, the first preview of the third season started airing in Yups TV, CMG new on-line television channel which debuted on 12 March. Also in March 2009, Casi Ángeles debuted on Disney Channel in Central American Feed, and in local feeds for Mexico, Colombia, Venezuela, Dominican Republic and Panama. The show was aired in 2007 in sister-channel Jetix in Argentina, Chile, Peru, Ecuador, Bolivia and Uruguay. The cast visited Mexico City to promote the debut. However, Disney broadcast an edited version of the series, since for those markets scenes alluding to sex, violence were cut.

The third season started with 18.4 points, matching the second-season finale. With no competitor – Patito Feo had been canceled the previous year – the third season became the highest-rated yet, with a 13.9 average (0.5 higher than the previous season). However, it could not reach the momentum and hysteria of the previous year and the finale averaged 16.6 points, not matching the debut or the previous year finale. The show was renewed for a fourth and final season, which averaged 11.6 points. Its final episode averaged 13 points. In both years, the cast did three-month stints at Teatro Gran Rex and toured nationwide. All four albums achieved Platinum certification. Casi Ángeles became the first Cris Morena Group production to reach four seasons since Chiquititas. The series the most watched teen-oriented show for most of its run and had four successful seasons at Teatro Gran Rex, with over 600.000 tickets.

In Israel, the first season of the show aired with lukewarm reception in the local Nickelodeon feed. As it happened before in Argentina and Uruguay, the show finally exploded in popularity when the second season started airing. Following the footsteps of Chiquititas and Rebelde Way in the early 2000s, Casi Ángeles became a huge phenomenon among tweens and teens. In May 2008, Mariana Esposito and Peter Lanzani visited Tel Aviv for a four-day promotional visit. They caused again a collective hysteria when arrived at the Ben Gurion International Airport and at the hotel, taped a television special, gave interviews and shot commercials for a popular hair product brand. In September 2008, Eugenia Suarez and Pablo Martínez also visited the country for extra promotion. They also gave interviews, had a signing session and played a showcase for over 20,000 fans at Kiryat Motzkin. In October, the cast did a series of concerts at Nokia Stadium for over 70,000 fans. They returned to the country for additional concerts in 2009. They also held concerts in Madrid in Spain and Mexico City in Mexico and visited Rede Bandeirantes studios in São Paulo, Brazil and Peru.

Casi Ángeles fourth season marked the last Morena production before she went on a hiatus following her daughter's sudden death in October. The final episode ended with a voice-over by Morena herself, which said: "Así como el día sigue a la noche, todo final anuncia un nuevo comienzo. ¡Que nos volvamos a ver!" (As the day follows the night, every ending announces a new beginning. We will meet again!).

Following the end of the show, the Teen Angels continued as a band and recorded a new album. Even though Morena contributed with a few songd, she did not have involvement with the project and the group was managed solely by RGB Entertainment and her son Gustavo Yankelevich. Eugenia "China" Suarez left the band after the finale and was replaced by Rocio Igarzabal, who played Vale in Casi Ángeles. They toured extensively across the country throughout 2011 and 2012 and made appearances at Dulce Amor, another successful Telefé telenovela which had two of its members (Rocio and Nico Riera) as part of its main cast. The Teen Angels held their final concert in June 2012 at Teatro Gran Rex. Teen Angels: El Adios, their final concert, was released as a 3D feature film in June 2013.

=== Other projects ===
In 2005, besides the second season of Floricienta, Morena debuted Amor Mío, a romantic sitcom she started developing with her daughter, Romina Yan, in 2002. The show starred Yan alongside Damian DiSanto and was the first Morena show not targeted to a young audience. Aired in prime time, during a time the country was undergoing a sitcom boom due to the success of Casados con Hijos and La Niñera, the show averaged 20.3 points and ended prematurely, despite high ratings, due to Romina Yan's pregnancy.

Amor Mío was adapted for Mexico's Televisa and for Russia. The Mexican version was shot in Argentina (similar to Chiquititas Brasil in the late 1990s) and was a hit in the country. The Mexican version had many more episodes than the Argentine version and the scripts which were not utilized due to the show's premature ending were finally used. Even after those scripts ran out, Televisa renewed the show and brand new episodes were written by the Argentine staff especially for Mexico. After Rebelde, Amor Mío and Lola Erase Una Vez, Televisa signed an exclusivity contract with CMG and RGB. Under the contract, the Mexican-net would help finance CMG productions, promote the shows overseas and handle international sales and distribution, besides having exclusive remake rights in Mexico. However, Televisa cannot interfere on the creative process.

In 2009, Romina and Damian reunited for a musical sitcom, B&B (Bella y Bestia), also produced by Morena and RGB. She played an uptight ballerina while he played a liberal rocker which lived across from each other with their kids. The show, aired at prime time, achieved decent ratings but was not a big success.

In 2006, Morena was also in charge for a primetime show at Telefe and produced Alma Pirata, an adventure-style production never before seen in Argentina. For the show, she reunited Argentina's hottest young actors (three of them discovered by her): Luisana Lopilato, Mariano Martínez (who real life romance was causing huge media attention at the time), Benjamin Rojas, Isabel Macedo and Elsa Pinilla among others. It had the difficult mission of beating Canal 13's big hit Sos Mi Vida on the 8 p.m. time slot. It could not do it and after a few months of struggling ratings, it was moved to 7 p.m. Because of that, Mariano Martínez decided to leave the show since his contract was exclusively for a prime time show. He was killed off and Nicolas Vasquez replaced him as Luisana's character love interest. Even though the show did not fulfill expectations as a primetime show, it did particularly well in the 7 p.m. slot. Its finale had a 22.1 points rating, almost matching its highest-rated episode (22.4 for its debut). The show averaged 16 points for its entire run and reached its lowest point during the third month of its run when it did 12.6 points and was almost doubled by Canal 13's competitor show. Even though Alma Pirata would not have music, it did end up having an original soundtrack album with songs composed by Morena and Carlos Nilson and sung, mostly, by Benjamin Rojas.

In 2010, Morena was responsible for the Argentine version of Spring Awakening. After years of being ignored by theatrical critics, she received acclaim and was awarded six Premios ACE, the most prestigious award in Argentine theater. Even though she was responsible for the biggest live musical box office draws in the country since 1996, she was never nominated for an ACE before. Despertar de Primavera was staged from March to June at Teatro Astral in Buenos Aires.

In 2012, YUPS TV, a television channel from RGB Entertainment and Cris Morena Group, made its debut on cable TV across Latin America and on the internet. The channel airs Floricienta, Casi Angeles and B&B.

=== Aliados ===
After a two-year hiatus, Morena announced her highly awaited return in November 2012 at the Grammy Latino red carpet. The project, titled Aliados, started being promoted in December with spots inviting young people to participate in a virtual casting. After a long pre-production period, production officially begun in March 2013. Headlining the project are former Casi Angeles actors Peter Lanzani and Pablo Martinez and newcomer Oriana Sabatini. The project was officially unveiled at the Telefe Upfront, Todos Juntos 2013, at the end of May. During the presentation, a tribute to Morena was presented and the producer made her first official appearance in over two years. Its cast—formed by Peter, Pablo and 12 newcomers—was officially unveiled. Oriana Sabatini, Mariel Percossi, Lola Moran, Joaquin Ochoa, Carolina Domenech, Nico Francella, Julian Serrano, Agustin Bernasconi, Maxi Espindola, Eliseo Renteria, Manuela "China" Viale and Jenny Martinez made their TV debut in the show. Boy Olmni, Mercedes Funes, Paula Recca and Dolores Fonzi are also part of the cast.

Aliados is Cris' first weekly show. There will be 40 episodes for TV and 240 webisodes. The webisodes will be unveiled daily while the show will be aired every Wednesday at 9 p.m. on Telefe and Thursday at 7 p.m. at FOX for the Latin America continent. Leandro Calderone, Casi Ángeles head-writer, is responsible for the scripts. Instead of RGB, Telefe will co-produce the show themselves, marking the first time Morena has worked directly with the channel since the 90s. As most Cris' projects, the show will heavily feature music with lyrics by Morena and production by Pablo Durand, which has worked with Morena since 2007, and 11 times Grammy award-winning producer Rafa Arcaute. The show was slated to debut on 11 June but it had its premiere date postponed to 26 June.

Originally, the show was supposed to be produced in Mexico alongside Televisa. However, Cris' had no desire to move out of Argentina and, in the end, Telefe agreed to finance the project. To promote it, Morena gave her first interviews since 2010 to La Nación, Clarín and Diario Perfil and made her first TV interview since 2005 at the Susana Gimenez show on the 24th. A press conference was also made before its debut and the show was heavily promoted across the web, on Twitter and Facebook. Morena herself joined Twitter to help promote the show.

On 26 June, Aliados made its debut on Telefe at 9 p.m. Instead of an early evening afternoon slot, the show will be aired at primetime weekly. During its debut, it had five worldwide trending topics on Twitter and it marked 16 points in ratings, being the most-watched show on Telefe during the day and the second most-watched show on the network of the week. However, after the initial buzz, ratings fell and stabilized at around 9 points.

In September, the first issue of Aliados official magazine was released. The following month, the stamps album was also released by Panini and the soundtrack album reached Platinum certification. The cast did an acoustic session in conjunction with Radio Disney and also sang live at the Mis Premios Nick award show. In November, the official live musical will make its debut at Teatro Gran Rex.

== Awards ==
- Martín Fierro Award
- CAPIF Award
- Gardel Award
- Nominated for Latin Grammy
