= List of Argentine telenovelas =

A telenovela is a type of a television serial drama or soap opera produced primarily in Latin America. Due to being a part of Latin America, Argentina has many telanovelas.

Argentine telenovelas
Title	Translation	Debut	End	Channel
90-60-90 Modelos	"90-60-90 Models"			
Alma Pirata	"Pirate Soul"			
Amor Mío	"My Love"			
Amor Prohibido	"Forbidden Love"	1987		
Antonella		1992		El Trece
Argentina, tierra de amor y venganza	Argentina, land of love and revenge	2019	2022	El Trece
Atraccionx4	"Attraction to the 4th Power"			
Bia		2019	2021	Disney Channel Latin America
Botineras	WAGs: Love for the Game	2009	2010	
Campeones de la Vida	"Champions of Life"			
Casi Ángeles	"Almost Angels"/Teen Angels	2007	2010	Telefe
Chiquititas	"Little Ones"/Tiny Angels	1995	2003	Telefe
Collar De Esmeraldas	"Emerald Necklace"			
Patito Feo	"Ugly duck"	2007	2008	Disney Channel Latin America & El Trece
Con alma de tango	"With Tango Soul"			El Nueve
Culpable de este Amor	"Guilty of This Love"			
Culpables	"Sinners"			
Doble Vida	"Double Life"			América TV
El Refugio (de los Sueños)	"The Refuge (of Dreams)"			
Floricienta	"Flinderella"	2004	2005	El Trece, Disney Channel Latin America & Telefe
Gasoleros				
Guapas	Beautiful	2014	2015	El Trece
Kachorra				
La Lola				
Los Exitosos Pells	The Successful Mr. and Mrs. Pells	2008	2009	
Los Roldán	"The Roldans"			
Mi hermano es un clon	My brother is a clone	2018	2019	El Trece
Mujeres de nadie	"Nobody's Women"			
Muñeca brava	"Feisty Doll"			
Niní	"Nini"			
Padre Coraje	"Father Courage"	2004		
Provócame	"Provoke Me"			
Quiero vivir a tu lado	I want to live with you	2017	2017	El Trece
Rebelde Way	"Rebel's Way"	2002	2003	El Nueve
Resistiré	"I Will Resist"	2003		
Ricos y Famosos	"Rich and Famous"			El Nueve
Rincón de Luz	"Corner of Light"			
Separadas	Separated	2020	2020	El Trece
Simona		2018	2019	El Trece
Socias	"Partners"			
Son amores	"Sweethearts"			
Son de Fierro	"They Are Made of Iron"			El Trece
Sos mi vida	"You Are My Life"			
Soy gitano	"I Am Gypsy"			El Trece
Soy Luna	"I'm Luna"	2016	2018	Disney Channel Latin America
Verano del '98	"Endless Summer"			
Violetta		2012	2015	Disney Channel Latin America
