= Mariano Martínez (actor) =

Argentine actor (born 1978)

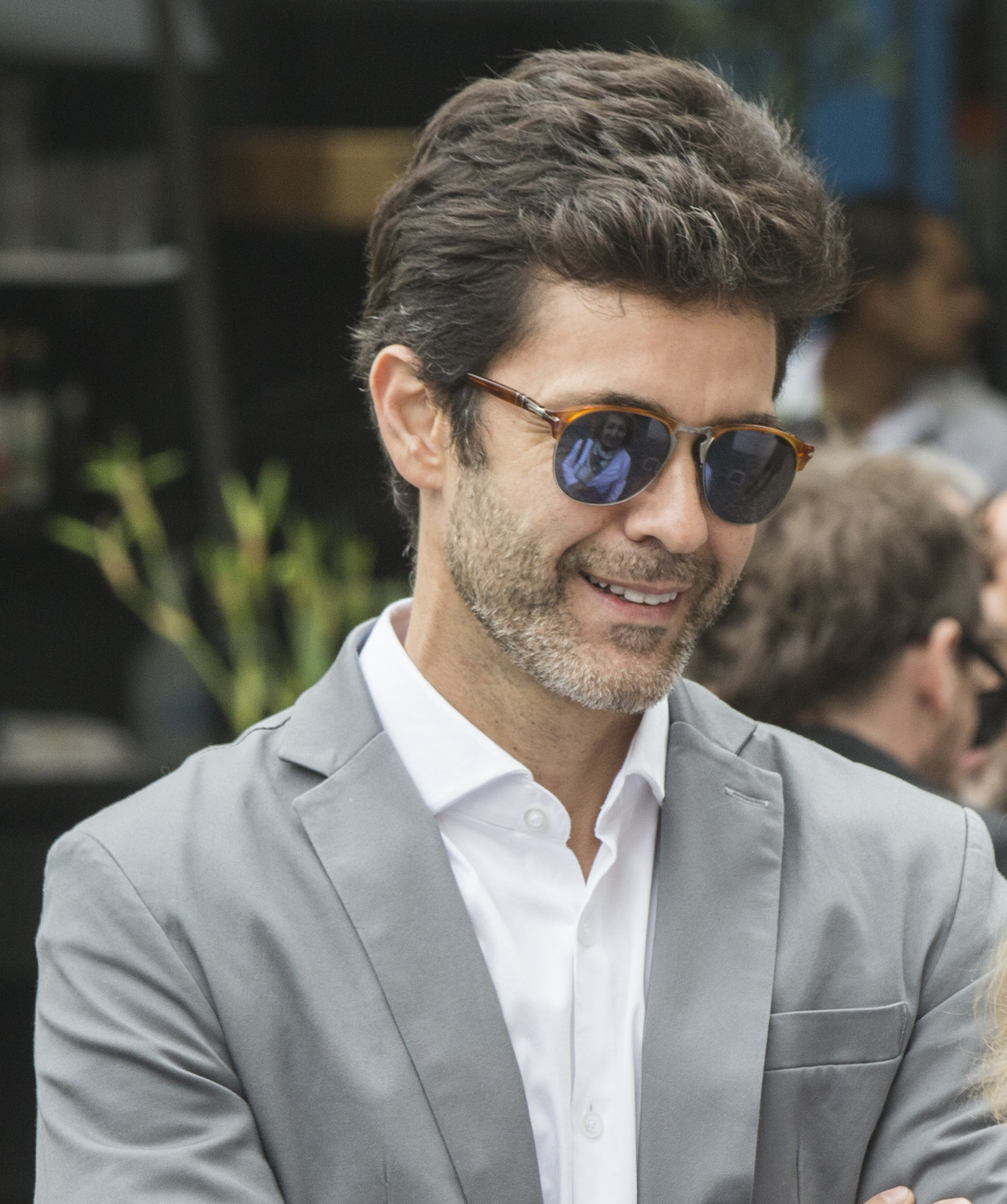
- Born: Mariano Gastón Martínez; 5 December 1978 (age 46); La Boca, Buenos Aires, Argentina
- Occupations: Model; actor; television producer
- Years active: 1995–present
- Spouse: Juliana Giambroni (m. 2012; div. 2015)
- Partner: Camila Cavallo (2016-2020)
- Children: 3

Mariano Gastón Martínez (born 5 December 1978) is an Argentine model, actor and television producer.

== Biography ==
Mariano Gastón Martínez was born on 5 December 1978 in La Boca, Argentina. After the separation of his parents, Mariano Martínez moved to Avellaneda, Buenos Aires with his mother and his five brothers.

== Career ==
Mariano Martínez began his career in television at age 16, in 1995, in television series Por siempre mujercitas. In his early years, he also participated in La nena, Mi familia es un dibujo, De la Nuca and with Carlos Carlín Calvo in R.R.D.T.. He debuted in cinema in 1998, with the film El Faro with Florencia Bertotti, a film directed by Eduardo Mignogna. Later starred NS/NC and Solo por hoy along with Facundo Espinosa. He later participated in Gasoleros and had a prominent role in the Pol-ka telecomedy Campeones de la vida with Soledad Silveyra and Osvaldo Laport. It had two seasons issued between 1999 and 2000. In June 2001 he acted in the television series 22, el loco. He later starred alongside Nicolás Cabré, Millie Stegman and Miguel Ángel Rodríguez in the telecomedy Son amores, broadcast by Canal 13, where he played the role of Martín Domingo Marquesi, a singer and footballer of Club Atlético All Boys. He acted in his two television seasons broadcast between 2002 and 2003, and in his theatrical version released in September 2002. In 2004 he starred with Dolores Fonzi the miniseries Sangre fría broadcast by Telefe. In 2004 he starred alongside Pablo Echarri, Peligrosa Obsesión. The following year he returned to Pol-ka starring in telecomedy Una familia especial. In 2006 he was one of the protagonists of the television series Alma Pirata starred alongside Luisana Lopilato, Nicolás Vázquez, Benjamín Rojas, Isabel Macedo, Elsa Pinilla Osuna and Fabián Mazzei, produced by Cris Morena broadcast by Telefe, later moved away from the series because of the channel's decision to change its schedule because it could not compete with Sos mi vida broadcast by Canal 13. Then he acted in the second season of the unit Mujeres asesinas co-starring with Manuela Pal, the episode, Soledad, cautiva. In 2007 he worked in Son de Fierro along with María Valenzuela and Osvaldo Laport, where he played the role of Juan Martín Fierro, a young man who became blind after an illness at age ten and was murdered weeks before the end of the series. The following year he starred with Araceli González, Marcela Kloosterboer and Nacho Gadano the theatrical adaptation of Closer. He returned to television in 2009, along with Luciano Castro and Gonzalo Heredia, he was one of the three protagonists of the television series Valientes. He also performed in the theatrical version of this television series in Mar del Plata and other cities in Argentina. In 2010 he put the voice to the main character of the animated film Plumíferos. He starred in 2011, the first season of Los únicos starred alongside Nicolás Cabré, Griselda Siciliani, Nicolás Vázquez, Brenda Asnicar, María Eugenia Suárez, Jimena Barón, Arnaldo André, Eugenia Tobal, Marcelo Mazzarello and Pepe Monje. Years later, in 2011, he returned to the cinema starring the romantic comedy Güelcom alongside Eugenia Tobal. A year later, he starred and produced the Argentine version of Mi problema con las mujeres with Colombian actress Ana María Orozco. In 2012 he starred in the movie La pelea de mi vida with Mariana Espósito And Federico Amador. In 2014 he was one of the co-protagonists of Camino al amor, starred alongside Sebastián Estevanez, Carina Zampini, María Eugenia Suárez, Juan Darthés and Sol Estevanez broadcast by Telefe. In 2015 he starred in telecomedy Esperanza mía broadcast by Canal 13, playing the priest Tomás Ortiz, who falls in love with a novice, Julia Albarracín. For his performance in it, he received the award Nickelodeon Kids' Choice Awards to the Favorite Actor. In 2016 he filmed the miniseries Amar después de amar starred alongside Isabel Macedo, Eleonora Wexler and Federico Amador, which was issued in early 2017. In August 2018, he premiered Mentiras inteligentes with Arnaldo André, Betiana Blum and Florencia Torrente. This one had a second season at the beginning of 2019.

== Personal life ==
From 2004 to 2006, Mariano Martínez was in a relationship with his co–star the actress, Luisana Lopilato. From 2012 to 2015, he was married to model Juliana Giambroni, with whom he has a daughter named Olivia Martínez Giambroni who was born on 9 October 2009 and a son named Milo Martínez Giambroni who was born on 28 March 2013. From August 2016 to 2020, he was in a relationship with the model Camila Cavallo, with whom he has a daughter, named Alma Martínez Cavallo who was born on 25 June 2017.

== Filmography ==
=== Television ===
| Year | Title | Character | Channel |
|---|---|---|---|
| 1995 | La nena | Axel Robles | |
| 1995-1996 | Por siempre mujercitas | Toni | Canal 9 |
| 1997 | De la nuca | Gabriel | |
| 1997 | Mi familia es un dibujo | Mariano | Telefe |
| 1997-1998 | R.R.D.T. | Miguel Rojas | Canal 13 |
| 1998 | Gasoleros | Diego Lázaro | Canal 13 |
| 1999-2001 | Campeones de la vida | Valentín D'Alessandro | Canal 13 |
| 2001 | 22, el loco | Alejandro Pereira | Canal 13 |
| 2002-2003 | Son amores | Martín Domingo Marquesi | Canal 13 |
| 2004 | Sangre fría | Matías Velasco | Telefe |
| 2004 | Los Roldán | Himself | Telefe |
| 2005 | Una familia especial | Santiago Molina | Canal 13 |
| 2005 | Mujeres asesinas | Maxi | Canal 13 |
| 2006 | Mujeres asesinas | Miguel | Canal 13 |
| 2006 | Alma Pirata | Benicio de Marco | Telefe |
| 2007-2008 | Son de Fierro | Juan Martín Fierro | Canal 13 |
| 2008 | Todos contra Juan | Himself | América TV |
| 2009-2010 | Valientes | Segundo Sosa Morales | Canal 13 |
| 2011 | Los únicos | Diego Rouvier | Canal 13 |
| 2012 | Mi problema con las mujeres | José Salinas | Telefe |
| 2013 | Una vida posible | Pablo | Canal 13 |
| 2014 | Camino al amor | Victorio "Vitto" Colucci | Telefe |
| 2015-2016 | Esperanza mía | Padre Tomás Ortiz | Canal 13 |
| 2017 | Amar después de amar | Santiago José Alvarado | Telefe |
| 2020 | Separadas | Joaquín Osorio/Diego Pereyra | Canal 13 |

=== Movies ===
| Year | Movie | Character | Director |
|---|---|---|---|
| 1998 | El Faro | Javier | Eduardo Mignogna |
| 2000 | Sólo por hoy | Equis | Ariel Rotter |
| 2002 | NS/NC | Joaquín | Fernando Musa |
| 2004 | Peligrosa obsesión | Tony Corsinni | Raúl Rodríguez Peila |
| 2010 | Plumíferos | Juan | Daniel De Felippo |
| 2011 | Güelcom | Leo | Yago Blanco |
| 2011 | Clipiado | Dante Delugio | Gustavo Garzón |
| 2011 | El destino de Luckong | Himself | Gonzalo Roldán |
| 2011 | Stealing Summers | Boyfriend | David Martin Porras |
| 2012 | La pelea de mi vida | Alejandro "Álex" Ferraro | Jorge Nisco |
| 2019 | Sola | Feliciano | José Cicala |

=== Theater ===
| Year | Title | Character |
|---|---|---|
| 2002 | Son amores | Martín Domingo Marquesi |
| 2008 | Closer | |
| 2010 | Valientes | Segundo Sosa Morales |
| 2011 | Los únicos | Diego Rouvier |
| 2015 | Esperanza mía | Padre Tomás Ortiz |
| 2018 | Mentiras inteligentes | |

=== Television programs ===
| Year | Program | Channel | Notes |
|---|---|---|---|
| 2018 | Primera cita | Telefe | Host |

== Awards and nominations ==
| Year | Award | Category | Work | Result |
|---|---|---|---|---|
| 2003 | Martín Fierro Awards | Best Comedy Actor | Son amores | Nominated |
| 2015 | Nickelodeon Kids' Choice Awards Argentina | Favorite Actor | Esperanza mía | Winner |
| 2016 | Martín Fierro Awards | Best Leading Actor | Esperanza mía | Nominated |
| 2017 | Notirey Awards | Best Male Protagonist in Daily Fiction | Amar después de amar | Nominated |
