= Luciano Castro =

Argentine actor

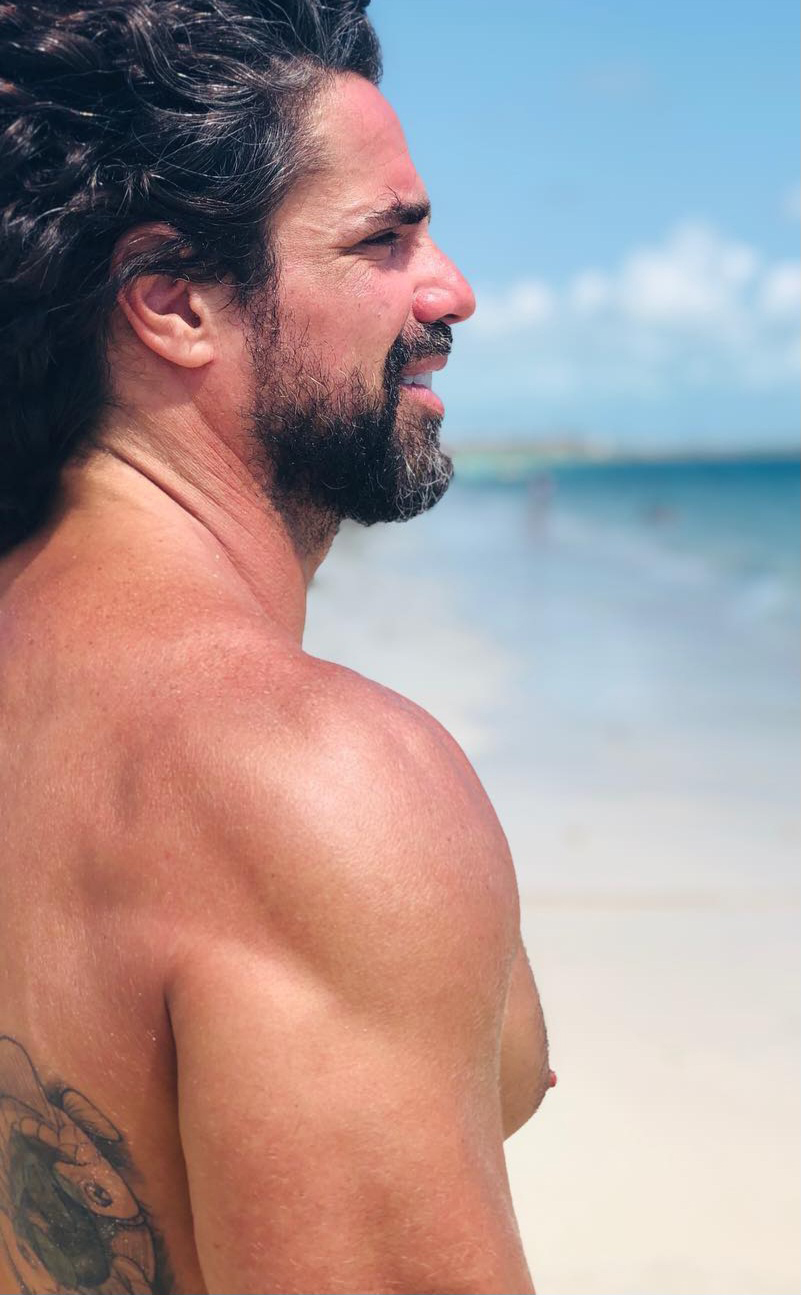
- Castro in 2019
- Born: Luciano Daniel Castro; 16 March 1975 (age 51); Buenos Aires, Argentina
- Occupation: Actor
- Partner(s): Elizabeth Vernaci (2005–2009); Sabrina Rojas (2010–2021); Flor Vigna (2021-2024); Griselda Siciliani (2024-2026)
- Children: Mateo Castro (b. 2002); Esperanza Castro (b. 2013); Fausto Castro (b. 2015)

Luciano Daniel Castro (born 16 March 1975) is an Argentine actor. He has worked as the lead actor in several successful telenovelas, such as Valientes, Herederos de una venganza and Sos mi hombre.

== Biography ==
He was born in the Buenos Aires, Argentina neighborhood of Villa del Parque. His father was goalkeeper of Club Atlético Chacarita Juniors. He also as a goalkeeper made the inferiors in Club Parque and in Asociación Atlético Argentinos Juniors until the Seventh Division and became pre-selected of the Argentine U20 Team.

== Career ==
Luciano Castro first worked in television in the game show Jugate Conmigo when he was aged 18, in the sketches and games, and singing songs like "Bella" and "Mía". He was initially known simply as "Luciano". He won the golden "Jugate Conmigo" award in the program. He was the lead actor of the 2007 telenovela Lalola, along with Carla Peterson. He received the Martín Fierro Award to the best actor, and the telenovela got the majority of awards, including the golden one. The next year he was the lead actor of Amanda O, along with Natalia Oreiro. This telenovela was made for internet, and summaries of it were aired weekly on television. Luciano Castro, Mariano Martínez and Gonzalo Heredia were the lead actors of the 2009 telenovela Valientes, that became the most successful telenovela of Pol-ka with an average of 27.3 rating points. Initially, Castro did not like the idea, but producer Adrián Suar convinced him to work in the telenovela. The format of three lead actors and three lead actresses was similar to the one used in the Colombian Pasión De Gavilanes. He worked in the 2011 telenovela Herederos de una venganza, with the actress Romina Gaetani. This telenovela was shot in a filming set in Pilar. Lobo, a 2012 telenovela starred by Gonzalo Heredia, was cancelled after a short time because of its low ratings. Luciano Castro was called to make a new telenovela to replace it, Sos mi hombre. He was reluctant to do that, as he is a friend of Heredia and had other projects, but his contract gave priority to the works with Pol-Ka.

Since September 2022, Castro began to star in the series El buen retiro, where he also appeared in full frontal nude scenes.

Between 2023 and 2024, he starred in the comedy play, El Beso (The Kiss), which gained much media attention for his kiss with co-star, Luciano Cáceres.

== Personal life ==
In 2002, his first son, Mateo was born. He was in a relationship with the radio host Elizabeth Vernaci for 4 years. Since 2010 he was in a relationship with Sabrina Rojas, with whom he had his daughter, Esperanza Castro, born on June 15, 2013, and his son, Fausto Castro, born on January 7, 2015.

== Filmography ==
=== Television ===
Year	Title	Character	Channel	Notes
1993	Jugate Conmigo		Telefe	
1995	Chiquititas	Luciano "Tano" Ponce	Telefe	
1996	Montaña rusa, otra vuelta	Tuqui	Canal 13	
1996	Como pan caliente	Lucas	Canal 13	
1997-1998	Rodolfo Rojas DT	Rubén Cilandro	Canal 13	
1999-2000	Campeones de la vida	Danilo D'Alessandro	Canal 13	
2001	Propiedad Horizontal	Sandro		
2002	Son Amores	Omar	Canal 13	Special participation
2003	Durmiendo con mi jefe	Abel Robles	Canal 13	
2004-2005	Los Roldán	Omar Estévez	Canal 9	
2006	El tiempo no para	Gonzalo Luna	Canal 9	
2007-2008	Lalola	Facundo Canavaro	América TV	
2008-2009	Amanda O	Dante Ruiz		
2009-2010	Valientes	Leonardo Sosa/Leonardo Morales	Canal 13	
2010	Lo que el tiempo nos dejó	Lorenzo	Telefe	"Ep: La ley primera"
2010	Ciega a citas	Tobi	TV Pública	Special participation
2010-2011	Malparida	Lucas Carballo	Canal 13	
2011-2012	Herederos de una venganza	Antonio Puentes	Canal 13	
2012-2013	Sos mi hombre	Juan José "Ringo" Di Genaro	Canal 13	
2014	Sres. Papis	Fabio "El chori" Carbonetti	Telefe	
2015	Conflictos modernos	Damian	Canal 9	
2016	Los ricos no piden permiso	Rafael Medina/Rafael Echegoyen	Canal 13	
2017-2018	Las Estrellas (telenovela)	Mariano Montenegro	Canal 13	
2018	100 días para enamorarse	Diego Castelnuovo	Telefe	
2019	Pequeña Victoria	Nazario Balboa	Telefe	
2022	El primero de nosotros	Nicolas Torres	Telefe	

=== Theater ===
Year	Title	Character	Theater
1994	Jugate Conmigo		Teatro Gran Rex
2002	Lo de la Susy		
2004	Lo que habló el pescado		
2005	Rita, la salvaje		Teatro Maipo
2005	Hipólito y Fedra		Teatro Lorange
2008	Jack se fue a remar		Teatro Metropolitan
2009-2010	Valientes		Teatro América
2011-2012	Camino negro		Teatro Roxy
2015	Pequeño circo casero de los hermanos Suárez		Centro Cultural San Martín
2017	Juegos de amor y de guerra		Centro Cultural de la Cooperación
2019	Desnudos		

=== Movies ===
Year	Movie	Character	Director
2009	Toda la gente sola	Julián	Santiago Giralt
2012	Amor a mares	Javier	Ezequiel Crupnicoff
2015	El encuentro de Guayaquil	Prisciliano Maldonado	
2019	Perla		

== Awards and nominations ==
Year	Award	Category	Work	Result
2002	Florencio Sánchez Awards	Theater Actor	Lo de la Susy	Won
2005	Premios María Guerrero a la actividad escénica	Stimulus	Lo que habló el pescado	Won
2007	Martín Fierro Awards	Comedy protagonist actor	Lalola	Won
2009	Martín Fierro Awards	Actor protagonist of the novel	Valientes	Nominated
2011	Martín Fierro Awards	Actor protagonist of the novel	Herederos de una venganza	Nominated
2012	Tato Awards	Best actor in daily fiction	Sos mi hombre	Nominated
2012	Martín Fierro Awards	Daily fiction protagonist actor	Sos mi hombre	Nominated
