= Montaña Rusa =

Montaña Rusa is Spanish for "roller coaster". It may refer to:

- Montaña Rusa (La Feria Chapultepec Mágico), in Mexico City, Mexico
- Montaña Rusa (Parque del Café), in Quindio, Colombia
- Montaña Rusa (Tibidabo Amusement Park), in Barcelona, Spain
- Montaña Rusa, an Argentine telenovela
- La Montaña Rusa, an album by Dani Martín

== See also ==
- Russian Mountains
