= Las Estrellas (TV series) =

2017 Argentine television series

- Genre: Telenovela
- Created by: Adrián Suar
- Written by: Marta Betoldi; Santiago Guerty; Mara Pescio
- Directed by: Sebastián Pivotto; Lucas Gil
- Creative director: Mariela Pita
- Starring: Celeste Cid; Marcela Kloosterboer; Natalie Pérez; Violeta Urtizberea; Justina Bustos; Esteban Lamothe; Gonzalo Valenzuela; Rafael Ferro; Luciano Castro; Nicolás Riera; Nicolás Francella
- Theme music composer: Willie Lorenzo; Florencia Bertotti
- Opening theme: "Las Estrellas" by Daniela Herrero
- Country of origin: Argentina
- Original language: Spanish
- No. of seasons: 1
- No. of episodes: 171

Production
- Executive producer: Adrián González
- Producer: Adrián Suar
- Cinematography: Sergio Dotta; Pablo Rocco
- Camera setup: Multi-camera
- Production company: Pol-Ka Producciones

Original release
- Network: El Trece
- Release: 29 May 2017 – 23 January 2018

Related
- Quiero vivir a tu lado; Simona

Las Estrellas is an Argentine soap opera produced by Pol-Ka Producciones for El Trece. Starring Celeste Cid, Marcela Kloosterboer, Natalie Pérez, Violeta Urtizberea, Justina Bustos, and Co-Starring, Esteban Lamothe, Gonzalo Valenzuela, Luciano Castro, Nicolás Riera, Nicolás Francella and Julieta Nair Calvo, it also had the antagonistic participation of Rafael Ferro. From 29 May 2017 to 23 January 2018.

== Premise ==
Five sisters from different mothers meet on their father (Mario Estrella)’s funeral, after his death. When reading his will, they discover that their father imposes an inescapable condition to inherit a big amount of money: they must successfully manage a "boutique hotel" for a year. Thus, Virginia (Celeste Cid), Lucía (Marcela Kloosterboer), Carla (Natalie Pérez), Florencia (Violeta Urtizberea) and Miranda (Justina Bustos) will have no choice but to learn to deal with their big differences. Their father's final wish was to reunite them.

== Cast ==
=== Main ===
- Celeste Cid as Virginia Estrella. She is the oldest sister, 32 years old. She is a lawyer. She is insecure and easily manageable, mainly by her ex-husband, Ignacio. She will discover a secret about her father that will change everything. She is very much in love with Javo but is not encouraged to embrace it. At the end of the story, she marries Javo and they have a daughter named Elena Valdés Estrella.
- Marcela Kloosterboer as Lucía Estrella. Carla's younger sister and Virginia, Florencia and Miranda's half-sister. She is 27 years old. She is cold and calculating but only because her first marriage didn't go well and she discovered her husband being unfaithful to her with the dive instructor on their honeymoon, that is why she does not want any man or any serious relationships in her life. She has a hard time expressing her true feelings. Everyone sees her as the "bad" sister, but deep down she is a very good person. She is afraid to be sensitive and betrayed, so she has a hard time showing her feelings towards Mariano. At the end of the story, she lives in a concubinage with Mariano and their twin daughters Mariana Lucía and Lucía Mariana.
- Natalie Pérez as Carla Estrella. Lucía's older sister and Virginia, Florencia and Miranda's half sister. She is 30 years old. She and Florencia were born on the same day of the same year. She is funny and a good person. Looking for more than friendship with some hotel employees, but it didn't succeed. She was only in love with Sebastián, who married her childhood friend after she stood him up at the altar. She falls in love with Lucho and they start dating. At the end of the show, she leaves to work at an important hotel in New York.
- Violeta Urtizberea as Florencia Estrella. Virginia‘s younger sister, Lucía, Carla and Miranda‘s half sister. She is 30 years old. She and Carla were born on the same day of the same year. She has Tourette syndrome and says inappropriate words when she gets nervous and at the least appropriate moments. She always felt like the "weird one" of the family, having trouble getting work and friends due to her syndrome. She was bullied during her childhood. She is the funniest and dreamiest of the sisters. She falls in love with Jazmín and marries her. At the end of the story, she is the driver of a school transport and together with Jazmín they adopt Violeta and Melisa.
- Justina Bustos as Miranda Estrella. She is the youngest sister, 24 years old. Daughter of a relationship that Mario Estrella had with his secretary, Coky. At the beginning of the novel, she worked as an escort, and went by "Mía" with her clients. She hides great secrets that will gradually be revealed. She fell in love with Manuel, but after his departure to Chile she became Federico's girlfriend. After Manuel's return, she temporarily got back together with him, and they were meant to elope. Then, he is murdered in cold blood and dies in her arms. Miranda falls back in love with Federico and begins a relationship with him. At the end of the novel, she fulfills her dream of succeeding as a singer.

=== Co-Starting ===
- Esteban Lamothe as Javier "Javo" Valdés. He is a chef at the hotel. He accepted this position as a favor to his friend, Carla, and brought his assistant and friend Jazmín with him. He was married to Amanda, with whom he has a son, Santiago. He is rebellious and adventurous. He falls in love with Virginia since the first day he sees her at his father's wake. He had a brief affair with Lolita. At the end of the story he marries Virginia, they have a daughter named Elena Valdés Estrella and he set up a catering company with Jazmín and Federico.
- Gonzalo Valenzuela as Manuel Eizaguirre. He is a Chilean lawyer who arrives in Buenos Aires while escaping from economic problems he had in his country because of gambling. Meets Miranda when she was still an escort and falls in love with her. He ends up working as a lawyer at the hotel and uncovers Ignacio's irregularities and secrets. He goes to Chile to settle pending accounts leaving Miranda shattered. He ends up at jail but his sentence is reduced thanks to his testimony against important people, the same people who will later put an end to his life by shooting him in the chest when he was about to escape with Miranda.
- Rafael Ferro as Ignacio Basile Córdoba. He is not married to Virginia but claims to be her husband. He is a lawyer and has his own studio. He is a liar and manipulator. He is always trying to dominate Virginia's life. He was who initiated Miranda in the exercise of prostitution.
- Luciano Castro as Mariano Montenegro. He arrives at the hotel asking to work as a car driver. He falls in love with Lucía, with whom he forms the most stable couple in the novel. He is funny and has self-centered personality. At the end of the story he lives in a concubinage with Lucía and their twin daughters Mariana Lucía and Lucía Mariana.
- Nicolás Riera as Leonardo "Leo" Loma. He is the hotel's receptionist. He falls in love with Miranda but after Federico began a relationship with her he decides to forget about her. Then he falls in love with Trini and begins a relationship with her.
- Nicolás Francella as Federico Alcántara. He is the hotel's bartender. At first, he falls in love with Lucía, but after Mariano's appearance, moves on from her. He becomes Carla's friend. He falls in love with Miranda with whom he begins a relationship. At the end of the story he puts a catering company with Jazmín and Javo.
- Nazareno Casero as Daniel "Dani" Caccavella. He meets Flor in a car accident and falls in love with her since day one. His family owns an abattoir, he is funny and very romantic with Florencia. After she stood him up at the altar, he accepted her love with Jazmín, and he spent his time trying to seduce any many women he met.
- Julieta Nair Calvo as Jazmín del Río. She is Javo's kitchen assistant and best friend. She fell in love with Florencia since day one, but she can't be with her. After Flor stood Dani up at the altar, Florencia begins to doubt her sexuality and feelings towards Jazmín. After Flor accepted her love for her, they start a relationship and get married. At the end of the story, together with Flor, they adopt Violeta and Melisa and set up a catering company with Javo and Federico.

=== Recurring ===
- Silvia Kutika as Teresa de Estrella. Mario's first wife and mother to Virginia and Florencia.
- Patricia Etchegoyen as María Elisa Casal. Mario Estrella's second wife and mother to Lucía and Carla.
- Patricia Viggiano as Constanza "Coky" Calmet. Being Mario's secretary, she fell in love with him. She is Miranda's mother.
- Ezequiel Rodríguez as Sebastián Le Brun. Psychologist. He is Carla's ex. He is married to Nadia, but wishes to get back together with Carla Estrella.
- Inés Palombo as Nadia Gutiérrez. Carla's high school classmate and Sebastián's wife.
- Maia Francia as Amanda. Javo's wife. She is a part of Ignacio's plan to break up Javo and Virginia.
- Andrés Gil as Damián. Miranda's University classmate.
- Jazmín Falak as Delfina López Mayo. Carla's former schoolmate and Fernán's daughter.
- Miriam Odorico as Muñeca. Hotel maid, suffers from short-term amnesia. She is in love with Ignacio.
- Vanesa González as Milagros "Lolita" Guzmán. She is attracted to Javo and had a brief affair with him. Her real name is Milagros and 10 years before, she escaped her family house in San Martín de los Andes due to her grandmother's constant abuse towards her. Subsequently, she became a hotel patchwork and reunited with his brother, with whom he re-established his bond thanks to Javo. At the end of the story, after not being able to force the relationship with Javo anymore since he continues to be in love with Virginia, she decides to break up with him and return to San Martín de los Andes.
- Pedro Alfonso as Luis Ángel "Lucho" Solar. He is Mariano's cousin and becomes the hotel's manager. He falls in love with Carla and they start a relationship. He had a brief affair with Camila. At the end of the story he left the hotel management after its closure and became commissioner on board to be closer to Carla who left to work in New York.
- Martín Seefeld as Fernán Kowacksinsky. Lucía's Gynecologist and Delfina's father. He falls in love with Carla and they start a relationship.
- Osvaldo Laport as Mario Estrella. Father to the sisters. He lied to all of his daughters and ex-wives about his death.
- Macarena Paz as María Trinidad "Trini". New hotel employee. She falls in love with Leo and begins a relationship with him.
- Agustín Pardella as Ciro.

=== Special participations ===
- Silvina Luna as Julia Ríos. Mariano's ex-girlfriend. She is Anita's mother and is imprisoned. She got a job at the hotel, but left after finding out about his ex's relationship with Lucía.
- Silvina Bosco as Diana. Lucía's psychologist.
- Gustavo Conti as Felipe. Lucho's friend.
- Martina Stoessel as Herself
- Sebastián Yatra as Sebastián Ordoñez. He is a young man with a great physical resemblance to singer Sebastián Yatra who is dedicated to imitate him.
- Benjamín Alfonso as Juan Segundo “Juanse” Faulkner. Eduardo Estrella's son of the heart.
- Luciano Pereyra as Himself
- Florencia Otero as Elena. Jazmín's ex-girlfriend. She is an assistant scientist to Dr. Escolano, works in the Marti group.
