= Carlos Calvo =

Carlos Calvo may refer to:

- Carlos Calvo (historian) (1824–1906), Argentine publicist and historian
- Carlos Calvo (footballer, born 1985), Spanish footballer
- Carlos Calvo (footballer, born 1992), Mexican footballer
- Carlos Calvo (gymnast) (born 1994), Colombian artistic gymnast
- Carlos Avendaño Calvo (born 1955), Costa Rican politician
- Carlos Calvo Calbimontes, Bolivian politician; President of the Chamber of Deputies of Bolivia 1919–1920
- Carlos Calvo (actor) (1953–2020), Argentine actor and comedian; star of the 1997–1998 telenovela R.R.D.T.
