= Son de Fierro =

Argentine TV series

- Genre: Telenovela; Comedy
- Created by: Adrián Suar
- Written by: Adrián Suar
- Directed by: Jorge Nisco, Rodolfo Antúnez
- Starring: Osvaldo Laport; María Valenzuela; Mariano Martínez; Soledad Fandiño; Felipe Colombo; Vanesa Gonzáles; Eleonora Wexler; Camila Bordonaba
- Opening theme: "Son de Fierro" (Alejandro Lerner)
- Country of origin: Argentina
- Original language: Spanish
- No. of episodes: 251

Production
- Producer: Pol-Ka
- Cinematography: various

Original release
- Network: Canal 13
- Release: January 8, 2007 – February 6, 2008

Related
- Sos Mi Vida; Por Amor a Vos

Son de Fierro (English: Made of Iron) is an Argentine television comedy, produced by Pol-Ka in 2007 and 2008. It was broadcast on Canal 13, becoming the most popular television series in Argentina in 2007 and 2008. The first episode was broadcast on January 8, 2007, and the last episode on February 6, 2008.

Main roles in Son de Fierro were portrayed by Osvaldo Laport, María Valenzuela, Mariano Martínez, Soledad Fandiño, Vanesa Gonzáles, Eleonora Wexler and Camila Bordonaba. Son de Fierro had 251 episodes. Son de Fierro follows the life of the Fierro family, of their members and their friends. The character played by Laport was called "Martín Fierro", but neither the program or the character were an adaptation or a free reference to the famed poem Martín Fierro by José Hernández.

During this show, Felipe Colombo, Camila Bordonaba and Vanesa Gonzáles formed the band, but it didn't "survive" the show. Bordonaba and Colombo had musical contract with Cris Morena (the band Erreway).

This comedy was nominated for the Martín Fierro Awards for the best comedy.

== Cast ==
=== The Fierro family ===
- Osvaldo Laport as Martín Fierro
- María Valenzuela as Lucía Fierro
- Mariano Martínez as Juan Martín Fierro
- Soledad Fandiño as Sandra Fierro
- Felipe Colombo as Lucho Fierro
- Fabio Posca as Ezequiel
- Freddy Villarreal as Ángel Fierro
- Dora Baret as Mimicha
- Juan Carlos Dual as Don Martín
- Isabel Macedo as Sissi

=== Others ===
- Camila Bordonaba as Karina Andurregui
- Eleonora Wexler as Rita
- Mario Pasik as José María Fontana
- Vanesa Gonzáles as Morena Fontana
- Facundo Espinosa as Amadeo Andurregui
- José Luis Mazza as Remo Ortelli
- Manuela Pal as Luli

== Awards and nominations ==
- Son de Fierro was nominated for Clarín Award for the best drama script.
- Martín Fierro Award nomination for the best comedy in 2008.
