= Facundo Espinosa =

Argentine actor and musician

- Born: Facundo Espinosa; 28 April 1980 (age 46); Buenos Aires, Argentina
- Occupations: Actor, musician, songwriter, composer
- Years active: 1990–present
- Children: 1

Facundo Espinosa (born 28 April 1980) is an Argentine actor and musician. He is probably best known for his performances in television series Campeones de la vida, Son amores, Los Roldán and Son de Fierro.

== Filmography ==
Film
Year	Title	Role	Director
1998	Dibu: la película	Víctor	Carlos Olivieri & Alejandro Stoessel
2002	NS/NC	Marcos	Fernando Musa
2004	Diarios de motocicleta	Tomás Granado	Walter Salles
2009	Esperando la carroza 2	Rulo	Gabriel Condrón
2010	Sudor frío	Román	Adrián García Bogliano
2013	Condenados		Carlos Martínez
2013	8 Tiros		Bruno Hernandez

Television
Year	Title	Role	Notes
1990	Clave de Sol		Recurring
1991	El árbol azul	Federico	Series regular
1992	Flavia, corazón de tiza		
1992	Los Libonatti		
1992	Zona de riesgo		
1993	Grande pa!		Recurring
1993	El club de los baby sitters		
1993	Amigos son los amigos		
1993	Diosas y reinas		
1994	Peor es nada	Various	Recurring
1994	Marco, el candidato		
1994	Son de Diez		
1995	Amigovios	Diego	Recurring
1996–97	Mi familia es un dibujo	Víctor	Series regular
1998	Verano del '98	Luciano	One episode
1999–00	Campeones de la vida	Federico	Series regular
2001	El sodero de mi vida	Mono	Recurring
2002–03	Son amores	Coco	Series regular Clarín Award for Best New Actor (2002)
2004–05	Los Roldán	Leo Roldán	Series regular
2006	Gladiadores de Pompeya	Dante Villegas	Series regular
2006	Mujeres Asesinas	Daniel / Lucas	Episode: "Mercedes, virgen" Episode: "Andrea, bailantera"
2006	Al límite	Adrián	Episode: "El calvario"
2007	Son de Fierro	Amadeo Andurregui	Series regular
2007	Los cuentos de Fontanarrosa	Julito	Segment: "Julito"
2009	Valientes	Nicolás Ortega / Lisandro Sosa	Recurring
2009	Dromo	Various	Episode: "La pajarera" Episode: "Latidos"; Episode: "El manto chino" Episode: "La caja"
2009	Ciega a citas	Juan	4 episodes
2011	Vindica	Soldier	Episode: "El último"
2011	Decisiones de vida	Juan / Fabián	Episode: "Espinas en el corazón" Episode: "Aprender a dar"
2011	Maltratadas	Jorge	Episode: "Cuestión de poder"
2013	Bienvenido Brian	Juan Manuel	TV movie

Theatre
Year	Title	Director	Venue
2000	"La excelsa"	Oscar Barney Finn	Sarmiento Theatre
2002	"Desaforados"	Esteban Student	Del Nudo Theatre
2003	"Taxi 2"	Luis Agustoni	Liceo Theatre

== Composer ==
=== Film scores ===
- Sudor frío (2010)
- Familia para armar (2011)
- Chacú (2011)

=== Television scores ===
- Femenino Masculino (2003) – Main Title Theme
- Sangre fria (2004) – Main Title Theme
- Showmatch (2008) – Main Title Theme
- Dromo (2009)
- Botineras (2009) – Main Title Theme
- Bienvenido Brian (2013)

== Discography ==
- 2008 – Loco suelto

== Awards ==
Award	Year	Category	Work	Result
Clarín Awards	2002	Best New Actor in Television	Son Amores	Won
