= Son amores =

- Genre: Comedy
- Created by: Adrián Suar
- Written by: Jorge Maestro; Ernesto Korovsky
- Directed by: Víctor Stella; Daniel De Felippo; Lucas Ruiz Barrea; Rodolfo Antúnez
- Starring: Mariano Martínez; Nicolás Cabré; Florencia Bertotti; Mario Pasik; Miguel Ángel Rodríguez; Millie Stegman
- Opening theme: Son Amores by La Mosca
- Country of origin: Argentina
- Original language: Spanish
- No. of seasons: 2
- No. of episodes: 463

Production
- Executive producer: Paula Granica
- Producer: Pol-ka
- Running time: 60 minutes

Original release
- Network: Canal 13
- Release: January 28, 2002 – January 2, 2004

Related
- Buen partido; Dos chicos de cuidado en la ciudad

Son amores is an Argentine telenovela produced by Pol-ka and issued by Canal 13 in the year 2002 and in the year 2004. It stars Mariano Martínez, Nicolás Cabré, Florencia Bertotti, Miguel Ángel Rodríguez and Millie Stegman. It is the telenovela of Pol-ka most awarded with 6 Martín Fierro Awards, 5 Clarín Awards and an INTE award.

== Plot ==
It is the story of Roberto Sánchez (Miguel Ángel Rodríguez) a lonely man, who thinks he was born to live with anyone. He is a soccer referee, he is obsessed by the rules in life, as by the rules of the game. His partner leaves him and when he believes again only the presence of his nephews and his niece invades him. This is also the story of Pablo Marquesi (Nicolás Cabré) and Martín Domingo Marquesi (Mariano Martínez) the two children of the sister of Roberto Sánchez who come from a small town in the interior and get to settle in his uncle's house with the goal of trying his luck and triumphing in football, playing in the first of Club Atlético All Boys. A short time later their younger sister Valeria Marquesi (Florencia Bertotti) joins the presence of her two brothers that can no longer support the village life. Getting used to a style of coexistence bullanguero, chaotic for a rigid man is a problem. This is what life proposes with the arrival of his nephews and his niece and will gradually learn to manage it. This is also the story of Dolores "Lola" Montero (Millie Stegman) a woman who turns out to be hidden in two ways of being. On the one hand it is an efficient professional. She works as a midwife with an obstetrician star, and knows how to favor the good arrival of a new life in this world. On the other hand she turns out to be her husband's most precious jewel. Guillermo Carmona (Mario Pasik) a man who, still loving her, maintains a certain selfishness that she does not initially perceive. Flattered, taken care of and believing in love, she starts the story by turning thirty in the midst of a crisis she doesn't understand. Her biological clock is marking her to meet some needs that she will gradually discover. A different world will open before her eyes when she is face to face and fall in love with that hermit who, like her and his nephews and niece is learning a new way of life.

== Cast ==
=== Sánchez Marquesi Family ===
- Martín Domingo Marquesi (Mariano Martínez) Martín is a lover of Cumbia and soccer. He arrives with his brother, Pablo, in the Capital of Argentina to play in Club Atlético All Boys. There he meets María, the love of his life and fulfills his dream of being a star of dancing music.
- Pablo Marquesi (Nicolás Cabré) Pablo arrives with his brother, Martín, to the Capital of Argentina to play in Club Atlético All Boys, but at the beginning he does not succeed, since only his brother remains in the team, but thanks to his sister, Pablo is in the team. He is the terrible brother of the Marquesi.
- Anita (Agustina Cherri) season 2; Anita is mute, product of a shock and she lives in the street, where she expresses herself as she can. When she meets Graciela and Graciela decides to adopt her and she stays to live with her. She and Pablo fall in love and live a romance.
- Valeria Marquesi (Florencia Bertotti) Valeria is the youngest, clumsy and sweet sister of the Marquesi, who later arrives in the city, tired of village life. She did not finish high school, so she has her own language. She works in a kiosk, always screws up and falls in love with Rafael. But over time she discovers that Coco is her true love.
- Roberto Sánchez (Miguel Ángel Rodríguez) He is a football referee, he is a fair and lonely man. Abandoned by his partner and without children, his life changes when he meets his nephews and niece and forms a new family and also when he meets Dolores.
- Liliana Sánchez (Cunny Vera) She is Roberto's sister and Martín, Pablo and Valeria's mother. She lives in the town of Capital Gómez with her partner and her other son, a baby named Brian.
- Laura Sánchez (Jazmín Stuart) She is the goddaughter of Roberto Sánchez, she arrives in the city to study and live in the house of the Sánchez Marquesi, which makes Valeria jealous.

=== Carmona Family ===
- Guillermo Carmona (Mario Pasik) He is a retired referee, and the head of the referee commission. He is Roberto Sánchez's rival. He is a manipulator and corrupt, he is a two-faced man. He is married to Dolores and is Mercedes ex-husband, with whom he has a daughter.
- Mercedes (Reina Reech) Mercedes is Guillermo Carmona's ex-wife, with whom she has a bad relationship. She is Candela's mother. She is a voluptuous and liberal woman. She has a very good relationship with Roberto Sánchez and his nephew Pablo. She suffers problems with alcohol and works as a public relations.
- Rita (Lola Berthet) She is the maid in the house of Guillermo and Dolores. She has a strong character, always confronts Guillermo. She is always aware of what is happening around her, to the point of being complicit in Dolores and Sánchez's relationship.
- Dolores "Lola" Montero (Millie Stegman) Dolores works as midwife. She believes she is happily married to her husband, Guillermo Carmona and in love with him until she meets Roberto Sánchez, and thus, true love. With the help of her friend Carmen, she manages to lead a double life by not having the courage to make a decision with her sentimental life.
- Candela Carmona (Laura Azcurra) Candela is the daughter of Guillermo Carmona and Mercedes. She has a correct profile and is addicted to study. She maintains a relationship with Pablo, but when he leaves her she radically changes her lifestyle by becoming more liberal.
- Nené (Beatriz Dellacasa) Nené is the mother of Dolores. She is unconditional with her son-in-law Guillermo Carmona and if she had to choose she would betray her daughter so as not to fail him.

=== Club Atlético All Boys ===
- Héctor Monti (Manuel Vicente) He is the vice-president of the club and Brigitte's father. He is corrupt and takes full advantage of the football business.
- Brigitte Monti (Carla Peterson) Brigitte is the daughter of Héctor Monti. She will establish a relationship with Martín, to the point of becoming obsessed with him, and spread discord among the brothers when she feels she loses power over them. Consented by her father, she loves money but hates working.
- María Sizone (Marcela Kloosterboer) María lives with her grandfather in the club. She is a humble girl, the only love of Martín Marquesi, but the relationship suffers too many conflicts, because of Martín's jealousy and selfishness, plus Brigitte's repeated attempts to separate them. Pablo is also attracted to her.
- Osvaldo Rigolé (Norberto Díaz) Osvaldo arrived at the club to replace Rafael as technical director. He is the brother of Graciela, and ally of Héctor Monti and Guillermo Carmona.
- Graciela "Chela" Rigolé (Gabriela Toscano) Graciela is a neighborhood woman and single mother. She manages to take care of the Club Atlético All Boys bar thanks to his brother Osvaldo, who places her in the club with the help of Guillermo Carmona. But he has to return the favor by making him his sister's boyfriend, but she is actually in love with Roberto Sánchez.
- Coco (Facundo Espinosa) Coco is an Club Atlético All Boys player and friend of the Marquesi brothers. He lives in a pension, and falls in love with Valeria from the first time he sees her, but he suffers constant rejections from her.
- Rafael Sáenz (Nacho Gadano) Rafael is the technical director of Club Atlético All Boys. Married with a son. He has a good relationship with Roberto since the time he started in arbitration, where Rafael was a soccer player. Rafael's quiet life is altered when he falls in love with Valeria, and they begin to have a relationship despite not having the approval of the Marquesi brothers.
- Aldo (Atilio Pozzobon) Aldo is a former referee and team prop. He lives with his granddaughter María in the club.
- Dardo (Martín Orecchio) Dardo is an Club Atlético All Boys player and enemy of the Marquesi brothers. He is the main accomplice of the evils of Brigitte.

== Recurring cast ==
- Carmen Fontana (Claudia Fontán) Carmen is a teacher of Spanish dances and is the owner of the house where Dolores gives her pre-delivery courses and Roberto gives his courses of arbitration. She is Dolores's best friend.
- Patricio Guillán (Nicolás Vázquez) Patricio is a football representative and friend of Martín, Pablo and Coco. He also becomes an artistic representative of the musical career of "Rey Sol Marquesi".
- Lila (Jimena Barón) Lila meets the Marquesi family when she moves with her mother to the apartment next door. She falls in love with Pablo, but he doesn't want to know anything with her. She is a friend of Valeria, but also allies with Brigitte in her evils.
- Wilson (Berugo Carámbula) He is the Uruguayan-Argentine of the building where Roberto Sánchez lives with his nephews and niece, where he is always willing to help. He is extremely liar and restrained.
- Beluchi (Luis Machín) He is a line judge, best friend and ally of Guillermo Carmona. He is a womanizer, but is always rejected by women. He envies Roberto Sánchez, so along with Guillermo Carmona they make his life impossible.
- Garabito (Marcelo de Bellis) He is line judge and friend of Sánchez. He is somewhat clumsy and sloppy. He suffers a lot for love, until he meets Rita, Guillermo and Dolores employee and they live a passionate romance.

== International Broadcasters ==
=== Américas ===
- Argentina: Canal 13 Internacional and Volver
- Costa Rica: Teletica
- Chile: Canal 13
- El Salvador: TCS Canal 6
- Guatemala: Canal 3
- Honduras: Sotel
- Mexico: TV Azteca
- Paraguay: Unicanal
- Uruguay: Canal 10 and Canal 7 Punta del Este

=== Europe ===
- Israel: Viva
- Spain: Telecinco

== Awards and nominations ==
Year	Award	Category	Nominees	Result
2002	Martín Fierro Awards	Best Telecomedy	Son amores	Winner
2002	Martín Fierro Awards	Best Director	Rodolfo Antúnez and Daniel De Felippo	Nominated
2002	Martín Fierro Awards	Best Author	Jorge Maestro and Ernesto Korovsky	Nominated
2002	Martín Fierro Awards	Best Leading Actor in Comedy	Miguel Ángel Rodríguez	Winner
2002	Martín Fierro Awards	Best Leading Actor in Comedy	Mariano Martínez	Nominated
2002	Martín Fierro Awards	Best Leading Actor in Comedy	Nicolás Cabré	Nominated
2002	Martín Fierro Awards	Best Leading Actress in Comedy	Florencia Bertotti	Winner
2002	Martín Fierro Awards	Best Leading Actress in Comedy	Millie Stegman	Nominated
2002	Martín Fierro Awards	Supporting Actor	Berugo Carámbula	Nominated
2002	Martín Fierro Awards	Supporting Actress	Carla Peterson	Nominated
2002	Martín Fierro Awards	Supporting Actress	Claudia Fontán	Nominated
2002	Martín Fierro Awards	Revelation	Lola Berthet	Winner
2002	Martín Fierro Awards	Revelation	Atilio Pozzobón	Nominated
2002	Martín Fierro Awards	Best Original Song	Son Amores by Los Auténticos Decadentes	Nominated
2003	Martín Fierro Awards	Best Telecomedy	Son amores	Nominated
2003	Martín Fierro Awards	Best Comedy Actor	Nicolás Cabré	Nominated
2003	Martín Fierro Awards	Best Comedy Actress	Florencia Bertotti	Winner
2003	Martín Fierro Awards	Best Comedy Actress	Gabriela Toscano	Nominated
2003	Martín Fierro Awards	Special Participation in Female Fiction	China Zorrilla	Winner
2002	Clarín Awards	Best Daily Fiction in Comedy	Son amores	Winner
2002	Clarín Awards	Female Revelation	Carla Peterson	Winner
2002	Clarín Awards	Female Revelation	Lola Berthet	Winner
2002	Clarín Awards	Male Revelation	Facundo Espinosa	Winner
2002	Clarín Awards	Male Revelation	Nicolás Vázquez	Nominated
2003	Clarín Awards	Best Television Actress	Florencia Bertotti	Winner
