= Marcela Kloosterboer =

Argentine actress (born 1983)

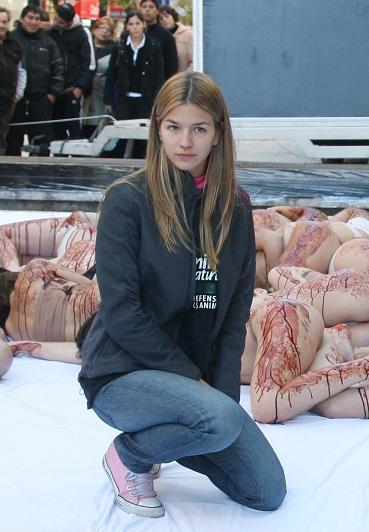
- Marcela Kloosterboer in 2008
- Born: Marcela Kloosterboer; July 5, 1983 (age 42); Vicente López, Argentina
- Occupation(s): Actress, occasional singer and businesswoman
- Years active: 1995–present
- Height: 1.70 m (5 ft 7 in)
- Spouse: Fernando Sieling (2014-present)
- Children: 2

Marcela Kloosterboer (born July 5, 1983 in Vicente López, Argentina) is an Argentine actress and occasional singer and businesswoman. She won Martín Fierro Award for Best New Actress in 1998 for Verano del '98 and was nominated for Argentine Film Critics Association Award for Best New Actress in 2004 for Roma. Kloosterboer is also known for her roles in television series Chiquititas, Son Amores and Lalola.

Kloosterboer parents' have Dutch heritage.

== Career ==
Marcela Kloosterboer began her career in 1995, in the children's novel Amigovios issued by Canal 13. In 1996, she begins to appear in the children's novel Mi familia es un dibujo issued by Telefe. She also participated in the series movie Dibu: la película. In 1998, as Josefina Vidal, she was part of the successful television series Verano del '98 issued by Telefe. The following year, in 1999, Cris Morena summons her to be the youth protagonist of the fifth season of the successful television series Chiquititas. In 2000, she returned to Verano del '98 and was part of Ilusiones issued by Canal 13. In 2002 and 2003 she was part of the cast of Son amores. In 2003 she participated in the episode El debilitador social from Los simuladores issued by Telefe. In 2004, she was one of the protagonists of Los pensionados. In cinema she participated in the film Roma. In 2005, she performed in the television series Sin código. During 2006 she was part of the cast of El tiempo no para. In 2007, she made a special participation in telecomedy Lalola. During 2008 she starred in the play Closer. In 2009, she was one of the protagonists of the successful television series Valientes issued by Canal 13. In 2011, together with Marco Antonio Caponi, she co-starred Herederos de una venganza issued by Canal 13. In 2012 she made a special participation in the last chapter of Graduados issued by Telefe. In 2013 she made a special participation, with an antagonistic role in the successful television series Los Vecinos en Guerra issued by Telefe. In 2014, she was summoned to be part of the cast of Sres. Papis issued by Telefe. In 2017 she was one of the protagonists of the successful television series Las Estrellas (telenovela) issued by Canal 13.

== Other work ==
In 2015, Marcela Kloosterboer launched its brand of ecological shoes called Klooster´s.

== Filmography ==
=== Television ===
Year	Title	Character	Channel	Notes
1995	Amigovios	Peggy	Canal 13	
1996-1997	Mi familia es un dibujo	Carolina Marzoa	Telefe	
1998	Verano del '98	Josefina Vidal	Telefe	
1999	Chiquititas	Candela Maza	Telefe	
2000	Verano del '98	Josefina Vidal	Telefe	
2000-2001	Ilusiones	Giuliana Parise	Canal 13	
2002-2003	Son amores	María Sizone	Canal 13	
2003	Los simuladores	Mariana	Telefe	
2004	Los pensionados	Floppy Valientes	Canal 13	
2005	Sin código	Virginia Alberti	Canal 13	
2005	Conflictos en red	Verónica	Telefe	"Episode 11: Amigos"
2006	El tiempo no para	Carolina	Canal 9	
2006	Doble venganza	Vera Pedraza	Canal 9	
2007-2008	Lalola	Romina	América TV	
2009-2010	Valientes	Isabel Gómez Acuña	Canal 13	
2010	Todos contra Juan 2		América TV	
2011	Los únicos	Virginia Alberti	Canal 13	
2011-2012	Herederos de una venganza	Emilia San Marco Piave	Canal 13	
2012	Graduados	Romina Novillo	Telefe	
2013	Los Vecinos en Guerra	Carolina del Río	Telefe	
2014	Sres. Papis	Helena Villamayor	Telefe	
2015	Conflictos modernos	Sandra	Canal 9	"Episode 4: Bien Común"
2017-2018	Las Estrellas (telenovela)	Lucía Estrella	Canal 13	
2019	Otros pecados	Cecilia	Canal 13	"Episode 7: El control"
2020	Separadas	Luján Alcorta	Canal 13	

=== Movies ===
Year	Movie	Character	Director
1997	Dibu: la película	Carolina	Carlos Olivieri
2004	Roma	Renée	Adolfo Aristarain
2010	Un lugar lejano	María	José Ramón Novoa
2011	Cerro Bayo	Romina	Victoria Galardi

=== Theater ===
Year	Title	Character	Director	Theater
1999	Chiquititas	Candela Maza	Cris Morena	Teatro Gran Rex
2002	Son amores	María Sizone		
2008	Closer	Alice Ayres		

== Discography ==
- 1999 — Chiquititas Vol. 5

== Awards and nominations ==
Year	Award	Category	Work	Result
1998	Martín Fierro Awards	Best New Actress	Verano del '98	Winner
2004	Argentine Film Critics Association Awards	Best New Actress	Roma	Nominated
2007	Martín Fierro Awards	Best Actress Novel Protagonist	Doble venganza	Nominated
2017	Notirey Awards	Daily Fiction Female Protagonist	Las Estrellas (telenovela)	Nominated

== Personal life ==
She is a good friend of actress Agustina Cherri. Kloosterboer is vegetarian and collaborated in an AnimaNaturalis campaign against the use of fur in 2008. She maintains a friendly relationship with other actors also advocates of animals such as Agustina Cherri, Mariano Martínez, Gastón Pauls, Nicolás Pauls, Nicole Neumann and Cecilia Oviedo. In late 2014, she married former rugby Fernando Sieling. In July 2015, it was announced that the couple was expecting their first child. On March 22, 2016, the actress gave birth to their daughter, Juana Sieling at La Trinidad Sanatorium, in Palermo. On May 29, 2019, she gave birth to their son, Otto.
