= Andrés Gil =

Argentinian actor

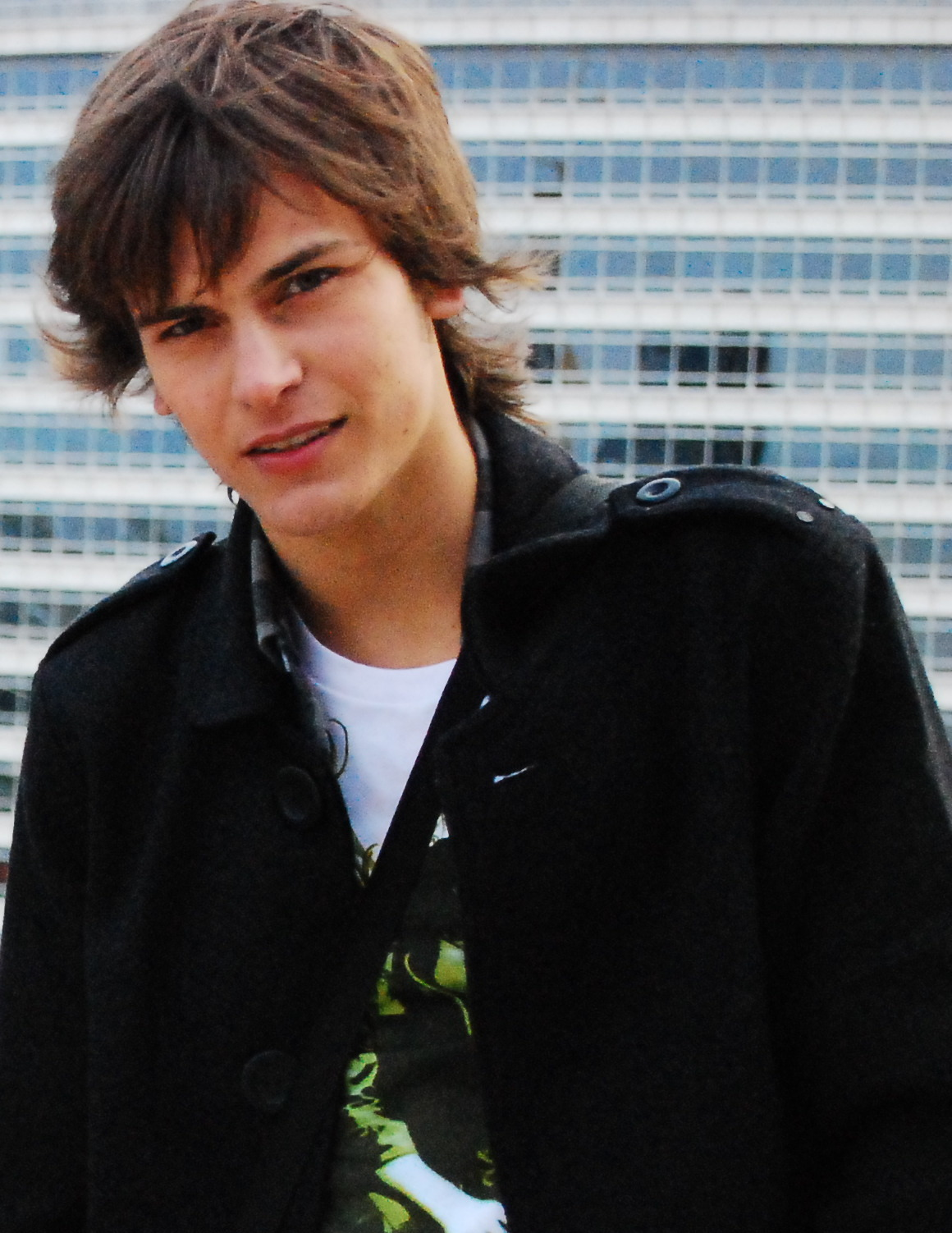
- Born: 27 January 1990 (age 36); San Isidro, Argentina
- Occupations: Actor; model; dancer; television personality
- Years active: 2007–present
- Partner: Candela Vetrano (2015–present)
- Children: 1

Andrés Gil (born 27 January 1990 in San Isidro) is an Argentine actor, model, dancer and media personality.

== Biography ==
In January 2012 Gil took part - with Bobo Vieri, Alex Belli, Anna Tatangelo, Ria Antoniou, Ariadna Romero and other contestants - in the eighth season of the reality show Ballando con le Stelle hosted on Rai 1 by Milly Carlucci with Paolo Belli and his Big Band. In that game, Gil, with the professional dancer Anastasia Kuzmina, obtained the 1st place: in April 2012 the couple obtained the 3rd place in the race of champions named Ballando con te against some past champions of the past editions of Ballando con le Stelle.

In September 2012 Gil took part, with Kuzmina, in the first season of Pechino Express, the Italian version (aired on Rai 2 and hosted by Emanuele Filiberto di Savoia) of the international reality show Peking Express, and in that game this couple obtained the 2nd place. Since 2014, Gil took part as an actor in Don Matteo and Che Dio ci aiuti, two of the most famous Italian fictions aired by Rai 1.

== Personal life ==
Since 2015, he has been in a relationship with actress Candela Vetrano. In June 2024, Vetrano announced that she was pregnant with the couple's first child. On November 14, 2024, the couple's first child was born.

== Filmography ==
=== Films ===
Year	Title	Role	Notes
2013	You Will Find Me Within You	Pablo	Short film
2015	Chiamatemi Francesco	Father Pedro	
2017	Pendeja, payasa y gorda	Conejo	
2018	El amor menos pensado	Luciano	
2018	The Title	Actor	Short film
2019	Persecución		Short film
2020	El amor es más facil	Diego Franco	

=== Television ===
Year	Title	Role	Notes
2007–2008	Patito Feo	Bruno Molina	110 episodes
2009–2010	Consentidos	Ivo López Beltrán	150 episodes
2012	Ballando con le Stelle	Himself - Contestant	Winner (season 8)
2014–2016	Don Matteo	Tomás Martinez	52 episodes
2014–2017	Che Dio ci aiuti	Carlo Romero	20 episodes
2017–2018	Las Estrellas	Damián	12 episodes
2018	Simona	Leonardo "Leo" Quiroga	60 episodes
2018	Mi hermano es un clon	Diego Durán	Episode: "Episode 1.1"
2019	Millennials	Mario	2 episodes
2019	Monzón: A Knockout Blow	Nino Benvenuti	13 episodes
2020	Separadas	Andrés Saavedra	36 episodes
2021	Punto de Quiebre 360	Agustín	Episode: "La oscuridad"
2022	Limbo... Hasta que lo decida	Marcos	
2022	El fin del amor	Federico Villanueva	10 episodes
2023	Frágiles	Román Macías	Web series
