= Agustina Cherri =

Argentine actress and model

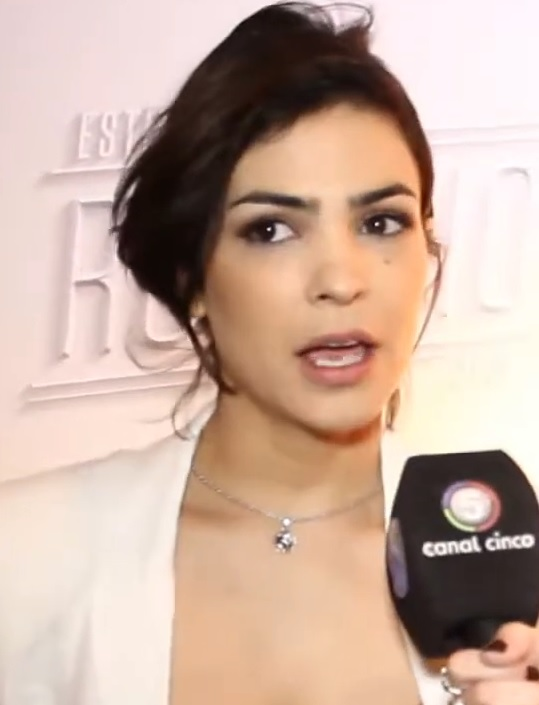
- Cherri in 2016
- Born: February 15, 1983 (age 42); Vicente López, Argentina
- Occupation(s): Actress, singer, model
- Years active: 1989–present
- Height: 1.50 m (4 ft 11 in)
- Partner(s): Gastón Pauls (2007-2014); Tomás Vera (2014-present)
- Children: 4

Agustina Cherri (born February 15, 1983, Argentina) is one of the leading actresses in Argentina, with more than 30 years of career.

== Biography ==
Agustina Cherri grew up as a fan of Flavia Palmiero, a famous children's show host during Cherri's childhood. She had been taking dancing classes and felt someday she would become a great dancer. In 1990, Agustina heard that there was an audition for children dancers at Palmiero's Telefe television show, La Ola Esta de Fiesta. Cherri asked her mother to take her to the audition, and she was chosen for the show, making it her first show business experience.

== Career ==
Agustina Cherri's first taste of fame came after she played Camila in 1991's Grande Pa!, a show that made her popular among Argentine pre-teens. At the same time, she participated in a variation of La Ola Esta de Fiesta, Flavia Esta de Fiesta. In 1993, she played Paola in Regalo del Cielo, which was not a major hit and has been a rather forgotten program by the general public. Her fame continued growing after her first stint at Chiquititas as Milagros Urién and, in 1998, she participated in Verano del '98, she played the role of Violeta Herrera, which was replayed by the Argentine television network in 2005. In 1999, Cherri was given her first opportunity to star in a show, playing Lucia Escobar, the leading female character in Cabecita. Two important events happened in Cherri's career during 2001: She was recalled to play Milagros Urién once again in Chiquititas, and she made her feature film debut, in a movie named Rodrigo, la Pelicula. Cherri participated as Gisela Vargas in Canal 13 Mil Millones, made in 2002, and as Anita in 2003 Son amores. That same year, she modeled for a calendar published by Caras magazine. During 2004, Cherri played Shamira in another major Canal 13 hit, Los Pensionados, and as Angela Capello in Hombres de Honor. In 2006 she starred in one of the chapters of Mujeres asesinas. At the beginning of 2007 she returned to the theater starring in the play ¿Quién le teme a Virginia Woolf?. In 2007 she's starring in the soap Mujeres de Nadie. The role was originally for Marcela Klobooster, who also starred in Chiquititas, but she couldn't accept it. Mujeres de Nadie is doing well on its afternoon slot at Canal 13. That same year she appeared in Todos contra Juan where she depicted herself. In 2009 she starred alongside Carmen Vallejos and Leonor Benedetto the prestigious unitary Rosa, Violeta y Celeste in Canal 7. In 2010 she returns to participate in the telenovela Todos contra Juan. After moving away from acting for almost a year and a half due to motherhood, Agustina returns to television as the protagonist of the new unit of Canal 7, El paraíso alongside Alejandro Awada and Mariano Torre. The unit and the performance of Agustina received extremely favorable reviews. In 2014, she was one of the protagonists of Pol-ka's sitcom Mis amigos de siempre alongside Nicolás Cabre, Nicolás Vázquez, Emilia Attías, Gonzalo Heredia and Calu Rivero. On the screen of Telefe she starred an episode of the unit La celebración, which was recorded a year before its broadcast. In the channel encuentro she produced and narrated the cycle Historias de género. In 2016 she is co-star of the telenovela Los ricos no piden permiso, where she plays Elena. In 2017 she star in the telenovela of Telefe Fanny, la fan where she plays Fanny. She is currently working on a theatrical work directed by Guillermo Francella based on the film of Paolo Genovese "Perfectos Desconocidos" alongside Carlos Portaluppi Magela Zannota, Gonzalo Heredia, Alejandro Awada, Mercedes Funes and Peto Menahem.

.

== Humanitarian activities ==
Since 2004 Agustina along with the support of the Municipality Pilar founded ADA since then chaired the non-profit association. With her charity work and the galas which celebrities came, she managed to open the ADA Home, with space to 20 people. The institution had psychologists and social workers who worked with each person who entered the shelter to facilitate their conditions when entering. The home was a transit institution which aimed to devoted the victims of gender violence the desire to have a decent life and the possibility of reintegrating into society. Currently the foundation is still valid.

== Personal life ==
From 2007 to 2014, Agustina Cherri was in a relationship with fellow Argentine actor Gastón Pauls with whom she has two children, daughter Muna, born on March 14, 2009, and Nilo, born on December 29, 2011.

Since 2014, Agustina Cherri is in a relationship with the musician Tomás Vera. On October 1, 2019, she gave birth to Alba, first daughter with her partner.

== Filmography ==
=== Television ===
Year	Title	Character	Channel	Notes
1989-1990	La ola esta de fiesta	Herself	Canal 9	
1991-1992	Flavia esta de fiesta	Herself	Canal 9	
1993	Regalo del cielo	Paola	Canal 13	
1992-1993	Grande, pa!!!	Camila	Telefe	
1994	Más allá del horizonte	Victoria Olazába	Telefe	
1995-1997	Chiquititas	Milagros Urién	Telefe	
1998-1999	Verano del '98	Violeta Herrera	Telefe	
1999-2000	Cabecita	Lucía Escobar	Telefe	
2001	Chiquititas	Milagros Urién	Telefe	
2001	Braceface	Sharon Spitz	Disney Channel	
2002	Mil millones	Gisela Vargas	Canal 13	
2003	Son amores	Ana "Anita" Lapromatta	Canal 13	
2004	Los pensionados	Shamira	Canal 13	
2005	Hombres de honor	Ángela Capello/Patter Nostra	Canal 13	
2006	Mujeres asesinas	Sofía	Canal 13	"Episode 28: Sofía, nena de papá"
2007	Mujeres de nadie	Laura "Lali" Garreto	Canal 13	
2008	Toilette	Carla	Cosmopolitan Televisión	
2008	Todos contra Juan	Herself	América TV	
2009	Rosa, Violeta y Celeste	Celeste	TV Pública	
2010	Todos contra Juan 2	Herself	Telefe	
2011	El paraíso	Laura Denegri	TV Pública	
2011	Historias Sencillas documental	Herself	TV Pública	Producer
2013	Historias de corazón	Anna	Telefe	"Episode 3: El gran ilusionista"
2013	Historias de corazón	Luz	Telefe	"Episode 23: Una nueva Luz"
2013-2014	Mis amigos de siempre	Rocío Monti	Canal 13	
2014	La celebración	María Viviani	Telefe	"Episode 6: Boda"
2015	Conflictos modernos	Solana	Canal 9	"Episode 3: Algo Habrán Hecho"
2016	Los ricos no piden permiso	Elena Rodríguez/Elena Villalba	Canal 13	
2017	Fanny, la fan	Fanny Rizzo	Telefe	
2020	Separadas	Romina Baldi	Canal 13	
2021	La 1-518, somos uno	Lola Vidal	Canal 13	

=== Theater ===
Year	Title	Character	Director	Theater
1990-1991	La Ola está de fiesta	Dancer		
1994	Grande brigada			
1996-1997	Chiquititas	Milagros Urién	Cris Morena	Teatro Gran Rex
2001	Chiquititas	Milagros Urién	Cris Morena	Teatro Gran Rex
2006	¿Quién le teme a Virginia Woolf?	Honey		Teatro Regina
2018	Perfectos desconocidos	Bianca	Guillermo Francella	Teatro Metropolitan Sura

=== Movies ===
Year	Movie	Character	Director
2001	Rodrigo, la película	Romina	Juan Pablo Laplace

== Discography ==
Solo	Year	Album
«Rechufas»	1995	Chiquititas vol 1
«Habia una vez»	1995	Chiquititas vol 1
«Mentiritas»	1995	Chiquititas vol 1
«Chufacha»	1996	Chiquititas vol 2
«Me pasan cosas»	1996	Chiquititas vol 2
«Chufachon»	1997	Chiquititas vol 3
«Por una sola vez»	1997	Chiquititas vol 3
«Cabecita»	2000	Cabecita
«Chiquititas baila así»	2001	Chiquititas vol 7
«Ventanita de Los Sueños»	2001	Chiquititas vol 7
«Vuela»	2001	Chiquititas vol 7
«Esperanza»	2001	Chiquititas vol 7

== Awards and nominations ==
Year	Award	Category	Program	Result
1996	Premios Martín Fierro	Best Young Actress	Chiquititas	Winner
2022	Premios Martín Fierro	Best Leading Actress	la 1-5/18	Winner

== See also ==
- List of Argentines
