= Mi familia es un dibujo =

Television series

- Genre: Telenovela
- Starring: Germán Kraus; Stella Maris Closas; Alberto Anchart; Facundo Espinosa; Marcela Kloosterboer; Andrés Ispani; Cecilia Gispert
- Country of origin: Argentina
- Original language: Spanish
- No. of episodes: 94

Production
- Executive producer: Claudia Rauch
- Production locations: Buenos Aires, Argentina
- Running time: 60 mins (including commercials)
- Production companies: Patagonik Film Group; Telefe

Original release
- Network: Telefe
- Release: April 2, 1996 – September 19, 1998

Related
- Dibu; Dibu film series

Mi familia es un dibujo (My family is a cartoon) is an Argentine live-action/animated telenovela broadcast by Telefe from 1996 to 1998. It led to a spin-off in 1998, changing its name simply to Dibu (Draw), the name of the cartoon protagonist.

Germán Kraus plays José "Pepe" Medina, the protagonist's father. Stella Maris Closas plays Marcela, Pepe's wife and Alberto Anchart played the grandfather, Atilio. Its youthful cast were Facundo Espinosa (Victor), Marcela Kloosterboer (Caro) and Andrés Ispan (Leo), with Cecilia Gispert providing the voice of Dibu. It also featured the antagonistic participations of Juan Vitali, Graciela Araujo and Adela Gleijer. Luisana Lopilato made her debut in the television series.

It was the first Argentine live action animated soap opera to have a cartoon as the protagonist in interaction with real actors. Due to the enormous success of the series, it had a musical album, with songs composed by Cris Morena. This was a best seller. There were also three motion pictures released in 1997, 1998 and 2002.

The series inspired the nickname of Argentine goalkeeper Emiliano Martínez.

== Plot ==
The main plot centres on the Marzoa-Medina, a multigenerational blended family whose life changes with a rare event: Marcela, the mother of the family, who is pregnant with her current partner, José "Pepe" Medina, gives birth to a cartoon boy named "Dibu".

Family members react to the birth of the child in different ways. Over time, the family learns to live with the animated child, but they must hide it from certain people for safety. Dibu experiences the same situations and feels the same emotions as a real child. The subplot thematizes adolescence and the relationship between parents and children.

The story ended abruptly when the third season began in which the plot changed, with new characters.

== Adaptions ==
The Dibu series featured three films aimed at family audiences. Dibu, the film, was released in 1997 to great success, and featured the same cast from the first and second seasons and included Nicolás D'Agostino.

In 1998, the second film was released, Dibu 2: Nasty's Revenge, which included a cast of actors and an original story different from that of the television series. The film was directed by Carlos Galettini, assisted by Emiliano Torres, and actors included Roberto Carnaghi, Hugo Arana and Beatriz Thibaudin.

In 2002, the third and last film in the saga was released, Dibu 3: The Great Adventure, with the leading role of Germán Kraus, Stella Maris Closas and the inclusion of a large part of the original cast of the television series.

The franchise was adapted for the Portuguese market as A Minha Família É uma Animação with the animated protagonist named "Neco".

== See also ==
- Roy - An Irish franchise about a live-action family with an animated child.
- The Stanley Dynamic - A Canadian live-action/animated sitcom about a live-action family with an animated child.
