= Collar De Esmeraldas =

2006 Argentine telenovela

- Created by: Raúl Lecouna
- Developed by: Dori Media International; Central Park Production; Ideas del Sur; Artear S.A.
- Directed by: Mariano Ardanaz; Claudio García
- Starring: Osvaldo Laport; Carina Zampini; Silvia Montanari; Arturo Bonin; Lydia Lamaison; Sergio Suracco; Norberto Diaz; Jose Maria Monje; Jean Pierre Noher; Ximena Fassi; Luciana Gonzalez Costa
- Theme music composer: Osvaldo Laport; Marcelo Wengrovsky
- Opening theme: "Te Tengo Que Encontrar" by Osvaldo Laport
- Country of origin: Argentina
- Original language: Spanish
- No. of episodes: 150

Production
- Executive producer: Leonardo Blanco
- Producers: Marcelo Tinelli; Raúl Lecouna
- Running time: 45 minutes

Original release
- Network: El Trece
- Release: March 14 – September 15, 2006

Related
- Mujeres de nadie

Collar De Esmeraldas (The Emerald Necklace) is an Argentine telenovela that aired in 2006. It starred Osvaldo Laport and Carina Zampini as protagonists.

== Cast ==
=== Seasons 1–3 ===
- Osvaldo Laport - Martin Rivera
- Carina Zampini - Romina
- Silvia Montanari - Lidia
- Arturo Bonin - Victor Rivera
- Lydia Lamaison - Celia
- Ximena Fassi - Eva Ferrari
- Sergio Suracco - Roby
- Luciana Gonzalez Costa - Roxana
- Jose Maria Monje - Tony Rivera
- Gisela Van Lacke - Carmen
- Alberto Anchart - Atilio
- Aldo Pastur - Horacio

=== Seasons 1 & 2 only ===
- Norberto Diaz - Dardo Ferrari

=== Season 1 only ===
- Jean Pierre Noher - Tobias
- Paula Siero - Lorena
- Laura Miller - Patricia
- Magela Zanotta - Martita
- Fernando Lúpiz - Avesani
- Tota Santillan - Tota
- Gustavo Guillen - Julio

=== Seasons 2 & 3 ===
- Patricia Viggiano - Marina Flores
- Melina Petriella - Abril Dorman

=== Season 2 only ===
- Cristian Sancho - Lucas Dorman
- Edward Nutkiewicz - Javier Dorman

=== Season 3 ===
- Germán Barceló - Daniel
- Susana Ortiz - Valeria
- Arturo Bonin - Alfredo Rivera
- Marcelo Cosentino
- Gimena Accardi
- Hilda Bernard

== Characters ==
- Rivera Family
  - First Generation
    - Alfredo
    - Victor
    - Lidia
  - Second Generation
    - Martin
    - Antonio (Tony)
- Franchini Family
  - First Generation
    - Luis
  - Second Generation
    - Romina (Romy)
    - Roberto (Roby)
    - Roxana (Roxy)
- Ferrari Family
  - First Generation
    - Celia Agüero de Ferrari
  - Second Generation
    - Dardo
  - Third Generation
    - Eva (adopted)
  - First Generation
    - Atilio
  - Second generation
    - Tobias

== Theme Song ==
The theme song for the novela, "Te tengo Que Encontrar" was written by Osvaldo Laport and Marcelo Wengrovsky. It was performed by Osvaldo Laport.

Lyrics:
Yo quiero volar
te tengo que encontrar
y envuelta entre mis alas
buscar la libertad.

Si sólo supieras, alma mía,
que yo soy quien te busca,
quien te sueña,
quien te espera en cada despertar.

Te tengo que encontrar
¡ para poderte amar!

Te tengo que encontrar...

== Syndication ==
The series is broadcast on TV2, a Malaysian television station. It is aired at 11.00 a.m. on Mondays to Thursdays in the "Pearl" slot from November 16, 2009. It was initially scheduled to be aired in January 2009 but due to some circumstances, it was postponed. In 2010, the programme was moved to the 9:30 a.m. slot.

On January 13, 2010, TV2 selected this series to be aired on the slot "Morning Delight" at 4:30 a.m. The series is now rescheduled to air at 1:00 a.m. from the previously odd-hour slot. This slot will re-run the series from its originating pilot.

== International Broadcast ==
Country	Network(s)	Series premiere	Series finale	Title	Time
Ghana	Viasat 1	October 1, 2013 -	"Collar De Esmeraldas"	Monday to Thursday	18:30 to 19:30
