= Verano del '98 =

- Also known as: Verano eterno
- Genre: Telenovela juvenil
- Created by: Cris Morena
- Written by: Patricia Maldonado; Leticia Castro; Fidel Chiatto; Claudio Lacelli; Marili Pugno; Amparo Iribas; José Ierfino; Betina Sancha
- Directed by: Carlos Luna; Gustavo Luppi; Federico Palazzo; Daniel Aguirre
- Theme music composer: Cris Morena and Carlos Nilson
- Opening theme: «Verano del 98» (Season 1) «Sálvame» (Season 2) «Déjate ser» (Season 3)
- Country of origin: Argentina
- Original language: Spanish
- No. of seasons: 3
- No. of episodes: 679

Production
- Executive producer: Gustavo Marra
- Producer: Cris Morena
- Running time: 45 minutes
- Production company: Cris Morena Group

Original release
- Network: Telefe
- Release: January 26, 1998 – November 24, 2000

Related
- EnAmorArte

Verano del '98 is an Argentine telenovela intended for teenagers, broadcast by Telefe from January 26, 1998 until November 24, 2000. Allegedly planned as way to cover a programming gap for the summer of 1998, it became such a hit that it ended lasting three consecutive seasons. After the series aired Telefe came under fire as it became apparent that Verano del '98 was a thinly veiled copy of the popular American teen drama Dawson's Creek, which also started airing around the same time. Gustavo Yankelevich, Telefe's chief artistic director, admitted having attended an early screening of Dawson's Creek in 1997 but thought Sony had lost interest in the project and decided to use it as inspiration when developing Verano del '98. Sony and Telefe settled out of court.

== Series overview ==
This series takes place in the fictional town of Costa Esperanza.

== Cast ==
=== Herrera Family ===
- Violeta Herrera (Agustina Cherri) Violeta is 16 years old. She is the daughter of Raúl and Elvira, she is the sister of Juan, Lucio and Jazmín, she is the mother of Teresa and she is the aunt of Juana. She dresses in bright colors and is always in a good mood. She works for Franco in the Morena. She will be in a constant "fight-reconciliation" with Mauro. She gets pregnant, until Germán makes her lose her pregnancy. She goes through a strong depression that separates her from Mauro. She meets Octavio. She marries Octavio forced by her mother to forget Mauro. But despite this she has an encounter with Mauro, becoming pregnant again. Sara, Octavio's mother, makes everyone believe that the baby she is expecting is from Octavio, but the truth comes to light and Violeta divorces from Octavio, to return with Mauro. She marries Mauro, they have their daughter Teresa and they are going to live in Chile.
- Juan Herrera (Juan Ponce de León) He is the oldest son of Raúl and Elvira, he is the older brother of Violeta, Lucio and Jazmín, he is the father of Juana and he is the uncle of Teresa. Juan is the man of the house. He is a womanizer. He works at a record shop that Sofía buys, who he will fall in love with. At the beginning he begins a secret relationship with her because of the age difference. Sofía leaves him when her children discover her relationship with him. He meet Paula who he falls in love and marries her. But then Paula is sick with leukemia and her family takes her to Cuba to combat her illness, but despite the attempts she ends up dying. After the death of his wife, Juan restarts his relationship with Sofía which again does not prosper, and he decides to leave Costa Esperanza to the South. He meets Amanda, a girl who is physically equal to Paula. This relationship is quite complicated from the beginning due to the problems of the past that surround it. Juan in the middle has an affair with Yoko, but finally ends with his true love, Amanda, with whom he marries, they adopt a baby, called Juana and go on tour after he got a musical contract.
- Lucio Herrera (Ezequiel Castaño) He is the son of Raúl, he is the brother of Juan and Violeta and he is the uncle of Teresa and Juana. Lucio is the son of Violeta and Juan's father but not of the same mother. He will arrive in Costa Esperanza with his father on a visit and will decide to stay there with his brother, sister and Elvira. He is adopted by Elvira. He will become Nicolás best friend. He has a brief relationship with Yoko. He has a short relationship with Clara. He has a relationship with Lola and asks her to marry him. He separates from Lola and has a brief relationship with Renata. He goes to live in Miami, Florida.
- Raúl Herrera (Mario Alarcón) He is the husband of Elvira, he is the father of Juan, Lucio and Violeta and he is the grandfather of Juana and Teresa. He abandoned Elvira and his children for many years and returns years later when his children are grown up. He ends up dying from an illness.
- Elvira de Herrera (Susana Ortiz) She is the wife of Raúl, she is the mother of Juan, Violeta and Jazmín, she is the adoptive mother of Lucio and she is the grandmother of Juana and Teresa. Her husband and father of her children, Raúl, abandoned them a long time ago and since then she fell into a deep depression. She adopts Lucio. When Octavio sets her house on fire, she is in the street with Lucio, so she ends up working as a maid in the house of the López Echagüe. She becomes the mayor of Costa Esperanza.
- Jazmín Herrera (Carolina Santangelo) She is the younger sister of the family. She is adopted. She is in love with Benjamín.

=== Vázquez Family ===
- Emilio Vázquez (Tincho Zabala) He is the founder of Costa Esperanza. He is the husband of Victoria, he is the father of Marlene, he is the grandfather of Clara, Benjamín, Connie and Yoko and he is the great-grandfather of Luquitas. He is a fair, sensible, honest and a very respected man in the town. He does not get along with his daughter Marlene, then they reconcile. He leaves the city to go to Buenos Aires to meet his beloved Victoria.
- Clara Vázquez (Dolores Fonzi) She is the granddaughter of Don Emilio and Victoria, she is the sister of Benjamín, she is the niece of Marlene and she is the cousin of Connie, Yoko and Luquitas. She is manipulator and calculator, but above all she cares about her family. She was Tomás first girlfriend and then Mauro. To retain Mauro she becomes Germán's ally, pretending a pregnancy to marry Mauro. She killed Teresa by mistake. The murder of Teresa led her to claim herself. She helped Darío by saving the life of one of his children. She has a short relationship with Lucio. She ends up marrying Darío and goes to live with Darío and the twins to Buenos Aires.
- Benjamín Vázquez (Tomás Fonzi) He is the grandson of Don Emilio and Victoria, he is Clara's brother, he is the nephew of Marlene and the cousin of Yoko, Connie and Luquitas. He is funny, immature, above all noble. He falls in love with Renata. He is Nicolás, Lucio and Tadeo best friend. He was shy, but then he is a heartbreaker. He became a womanizer reason in which his relationship with Renata ends, disappointed to have no future with the woman of his life. He returns to Buenos Aires with his grandparents.
- Catalina Yoko Valdés Vázquez (Celeste Cid) She daughter of Marlene and Manuel, she is the granddaughter of Don Emilio and Victoria, she is the mother of Luquitas, she is the sister of Connie and the cousin of Clara and Benjamín. She is shy, intelligent, but then she becomes outgoing. She has a brief relationship with Lucio. She becomes Nicolás girlfriend, she ends with him when she falls in love with Juan and has a brief romance and her first time with him, separating him from Amanda, but the relationship ends badly because of the age difference. She returns with Nicolás with whom she falls madly in love with but she cheats on him with Lucas, with whom she has a baby. She ends up marrying Nicolás.
- Victoria de Vázquez (Chany Mallo) She is the wife of Emilio, she is the mother of Marlene, she is the grandmother of Clara, Benjamín, Connie and Yoko and she is the great-grandmother of Luquitas. She goes to Buenos Aires to take care of her sick sister. She returns and has a relationship with Anselmo.
- Catalina Marlene Vázquez (Graciela Tenenbaum) She is the daughter of Don Emilio and Victoria, she is the mother of Connie and Yoko, she is the aunt of Clara and Benjamín and she is the grandmother of Luquitas. She does not get along with her father but they end up reconciling. She is outgoing, and who always goes straight ahead, a little crazy, always nice that ends up making the family happy. She falls in love with Federico. She starts a relationship with a Chef.
- Marilyn "Connie" Vázquez (Romina Ricci) Her name is Marilyn, but she calls herself Connie. She is the daughter of Marlene, she is the granddaughter of Don Emilio and Victoria, she is the sister of Yoko, she is the cousin of Clara and Benjamín and she is the aunt of Luquitas. She is a photographer and worked for a newspaper in Costa Esperanza. She is strong in character, always going straight. She fell in love with Tomás. She had a brief relationship with Damián and Pedro. She ends up marrying Ricky and they stay in the custody of Brisa.

=== Ibarra Family ===
- Federico Ibarra (Horacio Peña) He is the husband of Isabel and he is the father of Tomás. He is the doctor and director of the clinic of Costa Esperanza. After his separation, he meets Marlene with whom he begins a relationship. After being a discord between Daniela and Tomás, he goes on a trip to Canada and at the time of his return he goes to Buenos Aires and returns with Isabel. He goes to live in Canada.
- Isabel de Ibarra (Alicia Zanca) She is the mother of Tomás and the wife of Federico. She is a television producer. She separates from her husband after being unfaithful to her husband and moves to Buenos Aires. She returns to look for Tomás when he is paralyzed, takes him to live with her but finally she lives alone there and asks Federico for half of the house having to sell it to give her the money.
- Tomás Ibarra (Nahuel Mutti) Tomás is 17 years old. He is the son of Federico and Isabel, he is the cousin of Paula and Agustín. He lives in Costa Esperanza since he was born. He is a bit childish, but he is also very noble and brave. He will fall in love at first sight with Clara, but little by little he will realize that he is truly in love with Josefina. He falls in love with Connie. When he becomes paralyzed he falls in love with Daniela and marries her and she becomes pregnant but loses the baby. With the return of Josefina in Africa they are back together and he asks her to marry him. After Josefina's death he stayed in charge of Brisa and meets Ada who he ends up in love with, but their relationship thrives since she has psychological disorders and becomes addicted to the pills and Tomás ends up admitting her in a rehabilitation clinic. He goes to live in Canada.
- Paula Ibarra (Jazmín Stuart) She is the sister of Agustín, she is the niece of Federico and she is the cousin of Tomás. She arrives in Costa Esperanza with her brother to live at her uncle's house. She falls in love with Juan and marries him. She gets leukemia and dies.
- Agustín Ibarra (Pablo Palacios) He is the brother of Paula, he is the nephew of Federico and he is the cousin of Tomás. He arrives in Costa Esperanza with his sister to live at his uncle's house. He start dating Teresa.

=== Villanueva Family ===
- Germán Villanueva (Mario Pasik) He is the husband of Sofía, he is the father of Mauro, Teresa and Brisa, he is the uncle of Celina, he is the great-uncle of Álex and he is the grandfather of Malena, Agustín and Teresa. Germán is a wealthy businessman. He is a liar man, scammer, gangster and becomes a murderer, for a long time he cheated on Sofía, his wife with Dolores. He had a secret relationship with her for years, but always under the name of Sergio and got her pregnant. His family decides to settle in Costa Esperanza, as a result he discovers the deception of Sofía and the fatherhood of Brisa. He feigns his death to continue tormenting Franco and Dolores, posing as him to kill Sabrina because she has a video that shows him shooting Dolores in the middle of her marriage. When they escape, he returns home. Before returning, he makes an alliance with Clara in which she kept it a secret that it was he who impersonated Franco and he steals one of Teresa's children to give it to her and that she has Mauro by her side. When everything is discovered, Alicia leaves him in ruin making bad investments. Then he meets Amparo, while recovering his fortune and he marries her, he begins to mistreat and beat her. He is killed by Don Leandro.
- Celina Villanueva (Julieta Cardinali) She is the niece of Germán and she is the mother of Álex. Celina arrives in Costa Esperanza, in search of a son she had and abandoned due to pressure from her mother and uncle, who is already 7 years old. She will be reunited with Bruno, an old boyfriend of her, and will have a relationship with him again. When she believes that Bruno dies, he starts dating Damián, until Diego Linares pretends to be Bruno and begins a relationship with her. After the return of the true Bruno she separates from this and meets Tavo, another with whom she has a long relationship. She ends with Bruno and Álex living in London.
- Sofía de Villanueva (Patricia Viggiano) She is the wife of Germán, she is the mother of Mauro and Teresa and she is the grandmother of Malena, Agustín and Teresa. Upon reaching the town, she will become friends with Dolores, not knowing that she is really her husband's lover. Upon learning they will fight and she will leave town. She also hides a great secret and is that she maintains a relationship with Juan, who besides being much younger than she is who her daughter is in love with. She returns to be with Teresa and her twins and leaves again after Teresa's death.
- Mauro Villanueva (Alejo Ortiz) Mauro is 17 years old. He is the oldest son of Germán and Sofía, he is the brother of Teresa and Brisa, he is the father of Teresa, he is the cousin of Celina and he is the uncle of Malena and Agustín. He is a spoiled, womanizing and unbearable boy. But knowing Violeta he will begin to change, to become a noble, brave, sweet and protective boy. Although at first, he uses it to have fun but little by little he will fall in love and, despite the opposition of his father, she will end up being the great love of his life. That relationship will cause him a great fight with his dad, who will do the impossible to separate them, he succeeds and so Mauro begins a relationship with Clara and marries her. When he discovers Clara's deceptions and lies he separates, but does not return with Violeta since she is with Octavio. He becomes a priest, until he discovers that the baby that Violeta expects is his. He abandons the habits to return with Violeta. He marries Violeta, they have their daughter Teresa and they are going to live in Chile.
- Teresa Villanueva (Agustina Lecouna) She is the youngest daughter of Germán and Sofía, she is the sister of Mauro and Brisa, she is the cousin of Celina, she is the wife of Darío, she is the mother of Malena and Agustín and she is the aunt of Teresa. Although she has its hysterical side she will always fight because for her family to be united. She is very much in love with Juan, and it will break her heart to learn that he is truly in love with her mother. At the beginning she is friends with Josefina and Violeta, but after learning about Dolores and her father she will hold Josefina responsible, she will get very angry and leave with Clara and Felicitas. She meets Darío and becomes her great love, but her father will oppose seeing them together. She marries Darío and they have twins, but soon Clara will murdered her by accident.
- Brisa Villanueva Vidal She is the daughter of Germán and Dolores. She is the granddaughter of Susana, she is the sister of Mauro and Teresa, she is the niece of Josefina and she is the aunt of Malena, Agustín and Teresa. She is raised by her mom and Franco. Since her father uses her only as a mechanism to extort Dolores. She is under Rafael's care when her father murders Franco and Dolores. After Rafael escapes from being accused of Germán's murder, Brisa is left in the care of her grandmother and aunt. When her grandmother leaves, Brisa is under the care of her aunt. When the abandoned factory collapses and Josefina has the accident and dies, before dying, Josefina leaves the guardianship of Brisa to Tomás. Tomás becomes ill and travels with his dad to Canada to undergo surgery. Connie and Ricky remain in the custody of Brisa.

=== Vidal Family ===
- Susana de Vidal (Cira Ciggiano) She is the mother of Dolores and Josefina and she is the grandmother of Brisa. She goes to meet her other son, which is why she had abandoned them years before.
- Dolores "Loli" Vidal (Nancy Dupláa) Dolores is 27 years old. She is the daughter of Susana, she is the sister of Josefina and she is the mother of Brisa. She is a little stiff girl, since at 18 years old her mother left her and had to take care of her sister, who was only 7 years old. Since then, she lives alone with her sister Josefina, whom she raised as a daughter. She has an antique shop on the main street of Costa Esperanza. She has a secret relationship with a man named Sergio, the fruit of which she became pregnant with Brisa. As the chapters progress, it turns out that Sergio is really Germán Villanueva. She falls in love with Franco despite Germán's attempts to separate them. Germán tries to assassinate her and Franco, both escaping with Brisa to Bolivia. There they remake their life and are expecting a child. It is discovered that Germán murdered Franco and Dolores in Bolivia months before the birth of their second child.
- Josefina Vidal (Marcela Kloosterboer) Josefina is 16 years old. She is the daughter of Susana, she is the sister of Dolores and she is the aunt of Brisa. Josefina hardly remembers her mother. From the age of 7, she lives alone with her sister Dolores. She lives in Costa Esperanza since he was born and knows almost everyone in the town. She is Violeta and Tomás best friend, whom she has known since she was a child. Little by little she will realize that what she feels for Tomás is more than friendship. When her relationship with Tomás fails she takes habits and becomes a nun. She goes as a missionary to Africa where she meets Bruno, who falls in love with her, but is not reciprocated. She is still in love with Tomás for what she leaves habits. When they find Brisa who had been left by her father in New York City, she decides to take the habits again and return to Africa. She returns to Costa Esperanza to take care of her niece, Brisa, after the death of Dolores and Franco. She continues her work as a nun but still remains in love with Tomás, and with priest Pablo. She leaves habits. She begins a relationship with Tomás and gets engaged to him. But she realizes that she is no longer in love with him and that her only love is Pablo. When he leaves the habits they start a relationship, but Josefina dies because of a collapse in the abandoned factory. Before dying, she leaves Brisa's guardianship to Tomás and marries Pablo in the hospital.

=== Baldassari Family ===
- Franco Baldassari (Fernán Mirás) He is the older brother of Darío and he is the cousin of Rafael. Franco is a very distressed man who arrives very mysteriously in Costa Esperanza. Upon arrival he will buy the Morena, the village bar, and live from it. He arrives very alone and quickly has a good relationship with Violeta, Jose, Juan and Tomás, falls in love with Dolores. Although at first they get along badly, they will gradually fall in love and he will end up raising Brisa as if she was his own daughter. However, he hides a dark secret that torments him, Darío his younger brother is admitted to a psychiatric clinic that he thinks has caused the death of his girlfriend and to help him Franco blamed himself even though the latter had nothing to do with it. Since his arrival, his relationship with Germán is too tense mainly because of the love he has for Dolores when they were both about to marry. Germán makes him disappear by burning the barge even though he survives he loses his memory, so he knows Sabrina, who makes him pass for her husband, a psychiatrist killed on the barge, and takes him to live in New York, where he is found by Tomás, and with the intention of visiting him he returns with his new wife to Costa Esperanza and his reunion with Dolores will remind him again. He finally marries Dolores and will raise Brisa as his own daughter. He is thrown into jail unfairly because Germán made himself go through him to incriminate him in this way when he unmasks him escapes with Dolores to Bolivia, since Germán tries to kill them. In that country they settle, meet again with Brisa. In the third season it is discovered that Germán killed them in Dolores last month of pregnancy.
- Darío Baldassari (Alejandro Botto) Darío is the younger brother of Franco and he is the cousin of Rafael. Darío was a young man who was too rebellious where he joined a gang of criminals who later took him to be admitted to a psychiatric clinic due to the madness that caused him to accidentally kill a girlfriend he had during an outburst he had with that band, he which led him to distance himself from Franco, since the latter was posing as the culprit. With the help of Violeta, Dolores, Franco and Teresa, he will improve and leave the clinic. He will finally be able to start a family. He marries Teresa and has two twin children. When Teresa is killed, he loses possession of his children because of Germán, and goes into a deep depression, until Clara vindicates herself and helps him recover his children. He ends up marrying Clara and goes to live with her and his children to Buenos Aires.
- Rafael Baldassari (Rafael Ferro) Rafael is the cousin of Franco and Darío. When Dolores and Franco escaped to Bolivia, he managed to reconcile with his cousin, but after the death of both, he arrived at Costa Esperanza with Brisa. Upon arrival he meets Amparo and although they distrust each other they end up falling in love. When it is discovered that he is the one who killed Germán, he runs away from Costa Esperanza. He returns, once his innocence is proven in the murder. He starts a relationship with Amparo, with whom he has a daughter. He ends up in charge of the Morena with Norita.

=== Guzmán Family ===
- Amparo Guzmán (Gloria Carrá) After the death of her parents, she comes to live in Costa Esperanza with her younger siblings, Pedro, Damián, Trinidad and the twins Dolores and Tadeo. She is lawyer. She falls in love with Alejandro, but their love is impossible since he is married to her best friend, Vera. To forget him, she marries Germán, where she begins to be mistreated and beaten. When she is already Germán's widow, she meets Rafael, Eduardo and Joaquín, with whom she has a love triangle. She starts a relationship with Rafael and they have a daughter.
- Damián Guzmán (Ezequiel Rodríguez) He is the brother of Amparo, Pedro, Tadeo, Dolores and Trinidad. He arrives in Costa Esperanza before his brothers and sisters. He has a brief relationship with Connie. He falls in love with Celina, when Bruno supposedly dies. He meets Lupe, but that relationship will lead him to face his brother Pedro. He marries Lupe and goes to live with Lupe and his brother Tadeo to Buenos Aires.
- Dolores "Lola" Guzmán de Levin (Florencia Bertotti) Lola is 22 years old. She is the sister of Amparo, Pedro, Damián, Trinidad and the twin sister of Tadeo and she is the mother of Esperanza. She falls in love with Octavio when he dates Violeta, he ends up falling in love with her and they start a relationship. This relationship his mother will try to destroy at all costs. When Germán was married to her sister Amparo he tried to rape Lola. She and Octavio get married. She separates from Octavio but she does not divorce him. She begins a relationship with Lucio and gets engaged to him. She ends with her true love, Octavio with whom she has a daughter whom they call Esperanza.
- Trinidad "Titi" Guzmán (Catalina Artusi) Trinidad is 9 years old. She is the adoptive younger sister of Amparo, Tadeo, Dolores, Damián and Pedro. She is the biological sister of padre Pablo.
- Pedro Guzmán (Damián Canduci) He is the brother of Amparo, Tadeo, Dolores, Damián and Trinidad. He has a brief relationship with Connie. He falls in love with Lupe, which will lead him to face his brother Damián, who is also in love with Lupe. He starts a relationship with Perla and they have twins.
- Tadeo Guzmán (Santiago Pedrero) Tadeo is 22 years old. He is the brother of Amparo, Pedro, Damián, Trinidad and the twin brother of Dolores. When he arrives in Costa Esperanza he confesses to his brothers and sisters his homosexuality which will bring him many problems, especially with Pedro. He falls in love with Nicolás, but it's an unrequited love. He meets Ricky, his great love with whom he has his first time. He separates from Ricky. He meets Rocío and marries Rocío to forget Ricky, but fails. He goes to live in Buenos Aires with his brother Damián and Lupe.

=== Levin Family ===
- Octavio Levin (Guido Kaczka) Octavio is 21 years old. He is the blind son of Father Enrique and Sara, he is the adoptive son of Mauricio, he is the older brother of Nicolás, he is the father of Esperanza, he is the nephew of Conrado and he is the cousin of Norita. He is Jewish. He writes poems and eventually becomes a professional writer. He has a very bad character and is very lonely due to his blindness and the bubble in which his mother raised him. He hires Violeta as his assistant and falls madly in love with her. He eventually marries her, even though his mother tries to separate them. He divorces Violeta when she becomes pregnant with Mauro. Octavio will slowly forget Violeta until he falls in love with Lola, his best friend. Octavio and Lola begin a relationship. He regains his sight. He marries Lola and then separates from Lola but does not divorce her. He marries Perla, forced by his mother, but their relationship fails and they divorce. He ends up with his true love, Lola with whom he has a daughter whom they call Esperanza.
- Sara Katz Vda. de Levin (Rita Cortese) She is Mauricio's widow, she is the mother of Octavio and Nicolás, she is the aunt of Norita and she is the grandmother of Esperanza. She is cold and calculator. She hates Violeta and will try to keep her away from Octavio due to her social status, later he also hates Lola and will try to keep her away from Octavio. She becomes the unscrupulous Mayor of Costa Esperanza. It is she who dissolves the marriage between Octavio and Lola so that Octavio marries Perla and forces Octavio to marry Perla, but she does not realize until Octavio fakes his death that Lola is the woman that Octavio really loves and what is important what is she to him. She ends up in prison for all the crimes she committed during her tenure as Mayor of Costa Esperanza.
- Nicolás Levin (Nicolás Mateo) He is the youngest son of Mauricio and Sara, he is the younger brother of Octavio, he is the cousin of Norita and he is the uncle of Esperanza. He is Jewish. He appears in the first season as third in discord of Benjamín and Renata relationship, but then becomes friends with both. He falls in love with Yoko, but at first he is not reciprocated. When Tadeo confesses that he is in love with him he begins to doubt his sexuality. He returns with Yoko but she cheats on him with Lucas. He ends up marrying Yoko and converting to the Catholic religion.
- Nora Katz Levin (Mariana Prommel) She is the niece of Mauricio and Sara and she is the cousin of Octavio, Nicolás and Esperanza. She has a mental retardation, for which the evil Sara takes advantage. She always tells the truth. She ends up in charge of the Morena with Rafael.
- Esperanza Levin Guzmán She is the newborn baby of Octavio and Lola. She is the granddaughter of Father Enrique and Sara, she is the adoptive granddaughter of Mauricio, she is the great-niece of Conrado, she is the niece of Nicolás, Amparo, Pedro, Damián, Tadeo and Trinidad and she is the cousin of Norita. In an unexpected moment, at the end of Costa Esperanza's 100th birthday party, Lola broke down and went into labor. She is brought into the world by Tomás with the help of Octavio and in the presence of all the people of Costa Esperanza.

=== Beláustegui Family ===
- Leandro Beláustegui (Villanueva Cosse) He is the grandfather of Bruno and the great-grandfather of Álex. Leandro first appears as a bitter old man, when Josefina is sent from the convent to clean his house and help him. He seems to be a dark man and crushed by life. Little by little he will soften and become fond of her. He is always willing to play for his grandson Bruno and his great-grandson Álex. He is locked in psychiatric by Diego Linares when he pretends to be Bruno, he manages to escape with the help of Sol, until he recovers his family. He was the one who murdered Germán because of the damage he caused to his family, his friends and everyone who lives in Costa Esperanza. He dies after bringing the family together due to illness.
- Bruno Beláustegui (Diego Ramos) He is the grandson of Don Leandro and he is the father of Álex. He appears for the first time when Josefina goes to Africa, he is there as Dr. Camau. He falls in love with Josefina, but it is an unrequited love. Upon returning, he will meet Celina and find out a secret that she hides a long time ago, a son they had that he never knew and she had to give up for adoption. After recovering his son, he marries Celina, but Germán tries to kill him, he manages to survive by escaping, while Diego Linares takes his place. Upon his return, thanks to Diego's deceptions he begins to hate Celina, until by his grandfather he discovers that she was also deceived by him, then he will try to recover his wife and son. He meet Sol with whom he has a long relationship, initially loyal but then based on a pregnancy that is not his. He ends with Celina and Álex living in London.
- Alejandro "Álex" Beláustegui Villanueva (Matías del Pozo) Álex is 7 years old. Álex is the son that Bruno and Celina had, he is the great-grandson of Don Leandro and he is the great-nephew of Germán. After being abandoned by his mother Álex was given up for adoption. Celina came to him but his parents did their best to keep him from knowing the truth. To be close to him, Celina became the kindergarten teacher of the vacation colony to which Álex goes to. Upon discovering this, they take him away from her, on the trip they suffer an accident and die. Finally, little Álex will recover his biological parents. He ends living in London with his parents.

=== Arias Family ===
- Daniela Arias (Magela Zanotta) She is the sister of Lucas and she is the aunt of Luquitas. She arrives in Costa Esperanza to help Tomás in his rehabilitation, when he is paralyzed. She falls in love with Tomás. She marries Tomás, becomes pregnant and for natural reasons loses the baby. Having lost the pregnancy and the arrival of Josefina, lead her to commit several crazy things in order to retain Tomás. She goes to live in Uruguay.
- Lucas Arias (Lucas Crespi) He is Daniela's brother and he is the father of Luquitas. He had a relationship with Yoko and the result of that relationship they have a baby. He starts art school where he meets Zoe. He goes to Paris with Zoe.
- Lucas Arias Vázquez He is the son of Lucas and Yoko. He is the great-grandson of Don Emilio and Victoria, the grandson of Manuel and Marlene, he is the nephew of Connie and Daniela and the cousin of Clara and Benjamín. When he is born, the nurse who assists Yoko in childbirth tells her that her baby was born dead. The nurse agrees with Sara to get rid of the baby since she needed money and gives it to Daniela making her believe that the baby's mother abandoned him. The nurse writes a letter to Daniela telling her that the baby she has is stolen and that the baby's parents are her brother Lucas and Yoko. Lucas returned to his parents thanks to Nicolás. Nicolás manages to find Lucas and talks to him so that he does not take his son. Finally, Lucas leaves Luquitas and goes to Paris.

=== Recurring cast ===
- Pablo Valentini (Walter Quiroz) He is a priest and arrives at the convent where Josefina is and falls deeply in love with her and he abandons the habits to marry her in the hospital then when she dies. He is looking for his sister that was given up for adoption, thanks to Josefina, he later discovers, that is Trinidad Guzmán. He meets Elena. He marries Elena, they adopt all the children in the home he took care of and they are going to live in La Pampa Province, Argentina with all the children and they are expecting their first baby.
- Perla Gómez (Carla Peterson) Circus member "todos contentos". Together with El Turco, Lupe, Alí and Paco. She arrives at Costa Esperanza. She has a relationship with Ricky, her childhood boyfriend, she doesn't know that he is bisexual. She marries Octavio, but their relationship does not prosper and she separates from him and goes to Mexico City to start her acting career and then returns at the request of Sara but ends up divorcing Octavio. She starts a relationship with Pedro and they have twins.
- Guadalupe Arriaga (Florencia Peña) Circus member "todos contentos". Together with El Turco, Perla, Alí and Paco. She arrives in Costa Esperanza. She falls in love first with the Guzmán brothers, Pedro and Damián. Then she discovers that the Guzmán's father was her lover before he died. Finally she marries Damián and goes to live with Damián and Tadeo in Buenos Aires.
- Alejandro Molina (Federico D'Elía) He is a journalist and arrives in Costa Esperanza to carry out and a journalistic investigation on Germán, and with the intention of initiating a relationship with Amparo, the love of his adolescence. He is married to Vera, but he does not love her, and because of a disease she is going through he does not decide to leave her, finally Vera dies since she was really sick without knowing it. And when he returns to Amparo. He is killed by Germán.
- Alí (Diego Mesaglio) Circus member "todos contentos". Together with El Turco, Perla, Lupe and Paco. He arrives in Costa Esperanza. He has a brief relationship with Renata.
- Felicitas (Isabel Macedo) She is Clara's best friend. She tries to make Bruno fall in love with her without luck, they have a short relationship and he ends up leaving her for Celina.
- Dolinda (Lola Berthet) She is hired by Tomás and Daniela to help them with the house. She is a fan of Sandro. Lucas makes her believe that she will meet Sandro, and presents her with an imitator with whom she leaves. She has a relationship with Pedro.
- Renata Montili (Sabrina Carballo) Appears when boys start classes. At first he gets along badly with the girls from Costa Esperanza, because She is the director's favorite. She starts bothering Benjamín until they end up falling in love. She continues with many round trips. She has a relationship with Alí. She separates from Benjamín, when he leaves town. She begins working as a maid at the López Echagüe house and has a brief relationship with Lucio. She meets Tacio and they start dating.
- Amanda Corbalan (Jazmín Stuart) She lives in the south where she meets Juan with whom she has a summer romance. She likes the sea very much. She is physically the same as Paula. She has the ability to read minds and predict the future. She moves to Costa Esperanza. At the beginning, the relationship with Juan becomes difficult since her resemblance to Paula makes Juan doubt that he loves her for what she is, or for who she looks like. She has a short relationship with her ex-boyfriend Dante and then with Tavo. Finally, after many comings, turns and confusion ends with her great love Juan, they get married, they adopt a baby, called Juana and they go on tour after Juan gets a musical contract.
- Ricardo Serdá (Mariano Torre) He was born in Ushuaia and is bisexual. He leaves the reformatory and arrives in Costa Esperanza helped by his friend Lucio. He falls in love with Tadeo and begins a relationship with him. Then he has a short relationship with Perla, his childhood girlfriend. He falls in love with Connie and ends up marrying her and they stay in the custody of Brisa.
- Gustavo Torres (Paulo Brunetti) He is a journalist who arrives in Costa Esperanza to investigate and photograph Amanda in her musical success. He falls in love with her and has a short relationship. He is addicted to cocaine. Then he meets Celina, who he falls in love with, and teams up with Sol to separate Celina and Bruno and cheat them with money. He is the father of the baby who expects Sol. He escapes from Costa Esperanza with his newborn baby.
- Elena Moreno (Leonora Balcarce) She arrives in Costa Esperanza to take over the home where Pablo works. She falls in love with him and although her father wants to separate them. She marries Pablo, they adopt all the children in the home he took care of and they are going to live in La Pampa Province, Argentina with all the children and they are expecting their first baby.
- Rocío Echeverría (Valeria Britos) She is the woman with whom Tadeo marries to hide his homosexuality. When she was 15 years old she was sexually abused. Tadeo leaves her standing on the altar the same day of the wedding. She goes to live in Buenos Aires with her mother.
- Diego Linares (Fernando Tobi) He is the Doctor who knows Bruno when he is dead. He comes to the life of Celina and Álex posing as the real Bruno, with the intention of staying with Leandro's family and fortune. After kidnapping Celina goes to jail thinking that he ran over her and when he finds out she is alive, he escapes, kidnaps Sol to get to Bruno, and dies in the escape.
- Zoe Caplan (Celina Zambón) She is a plastic artist who knows Lucas at the art institute, begins to go to her atelier to paint before marrying Yoko, they begin to date in secret being the cause of the separation of them shortly after getting married. She goes to paint in Paris and they meet again when Lucas decides to go after a job opportunity.
- Sol Vega (Laura Liste) She is a humble and lonely girl who rescues Leandro when she escapes from the psychiatric hospital where Linares locked her. Through Leandro she meets Bruno who she falls in love with. She pretends to be pregnant with Bruno's baby to separate him from Celina, but the baby she expects is actually from Tavo. She ends up in prison for having kidnapped Álex.
- Sabrina (Sandra Ballesteros) Sabrina is the woman who pretends to be Franco's wife when he loses his memory. When Franco recovers his memories, she will try to separate him from Dolores. She becomes an accomplice and lover of Germán with whom she marries. She will try again to separate Franco and Dolores. She is killed by Germán.
- Alicia (Helena Jios) First she was the curator of the school where Josefina interned for a while. Then she was a prison guard when Dolores was imprisoned. Then she left that job to work as a maid at Don Emilio. She becomes an accomplice and ally of Germán and Clara. She causes Germán to lose his fortune, which is why he murders her.
- Ada (Soledad Silva Fernández) She is a Spanish hippie that Tomás knows, after the death of Josefina. She becomes the babysitter of Brisa, and falls in love with Tomás. She has psychological disorders, which leads her to be addicted to certain pills. Because of this, her relationship with Tomás does not prosper, and she is interned in a rehabilitation clinic.
- Luz (Malena Figo) She is a friend of Violeta and Josefina. She works at Morena and goes out with Juan. She leaves Costa Esperanza when her mother sends her to live with her aunt.
- Nano (Marcos Marotta) He is part of the group of friends of Juan, Tomás, Violeta and Josefina.

== Production ==
Most of the scenes were shot in Buenos Aires.

== Soundtrack ==
The telenovela was the first musical youth series made in Argentina. It had two albums, corresponding to the first and second seasons. The third season featured new songs that were never released on an album. All the songs were composed by Cris Morena and Carlos Nilson, some originals for the television series, and others that were reversals of other previous series such as Jugate conmigo and Mi familia es un dibujo. They were performed by the youth cast and by professional musicians.

=== First album ===
- Verano del '98 by Cynthia Nilson
- El cristal
- 15 de marzo
- Señora
- Sin querer
- Brisa
- Más a fondo
- Bellísima
- Nada nos puede pasar

=== Second album ===
- Sálvame
- Tanto te amo
- Vale la pena
- Cuando el corazón me mate
- Poder ser uno mismo
- ¿Quién es?
- Quereme
- Dos segundos
- Libres de corazón
- No se vivir
- Querido amor

=== Third album Unpublished ===
- Déjate ser
- Loco
- Perdí el camino
- Destiempo
- Tan lejos
- Nuestro amor
- Hay amores

== International Broadcasters ==
=== Américas ===
- Argentina: Telefe Internacional
- Colombia: RCN
- Chile: TV+
- Ecuador: TC Televisión and Ecuador TV
- El Salvador: Megavisión
- Mexico: Azteca 7
- Nicaragua: Televicentro Canal 2
- Panama: Televisora Nacional
- Paraguay: SNT
- Puerto Rico: Telemundo PR
- Uruguay: Monte Carlo TV
- Venezuela: RCTV

=== Europe ===
- Cyprus: Sigma TV
- Greece: Star Channel, Alter Channel
- Israel: Yes (Israel)
