= Mario Pasik =

Argentine actor

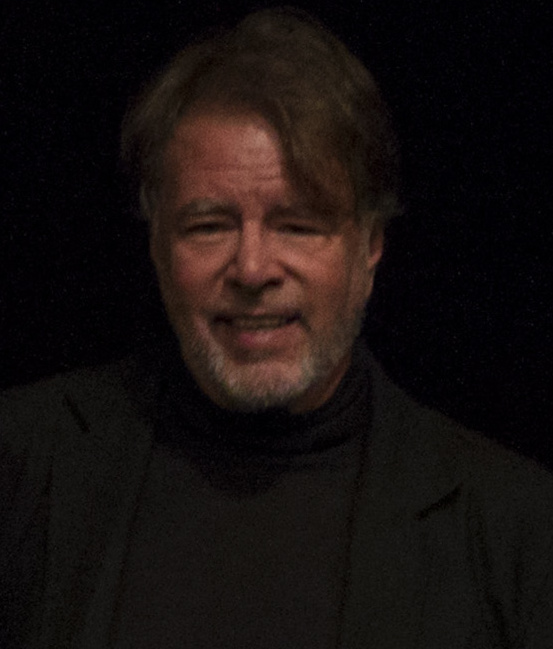
- Born: March 3, 1951 (age 75); Versalles, Buenos Aires, Argentina
- Occupations: actor (films, TV and theatre)
- Years active: 1964 – present
- Spouse: Marta Betoldi (until 2013)

Mario Pasik (born 3 March 1951) is an Argentine actor. He is most known for TV series Son de Fierro (2007), Endless Summer (1998) and Champs 12 (2009).

== Biography ==
He was born on 3 March 1951 in Versalles, Buenos Aires, and is the son of a merchant father and a housewife mother. His family later moved to Villa Crespo. He is younger brother of the actor Salo Pasik (1945-2017).

== Career ==
He made his acting debut when he was 13 years old, performing in Historias para recounted, a work by the Argentinean Osvaldo Dragún and then in Petition by Antón Chéjov.

He studied theater with actor Raúl Serrano. He performed in the 'Cristal Sun' with Inda Ledesma, Jorge Marrale, Alicia Bruzzo and Rodolfo Bebán.

He has performed in films such as Contraluz (2001), The Face of the Angel (1998), The Salt in the Wound (1996), Of my neighborhood with love (1995) and Where are you my love? life that I can not find you? (1992), among many others.

In 2007, he performed in 5 episodes of the television-novel 'Tango del Ultimo Amor', a co-production of Telefé and the Russian channel 'TV Channel Russia', made exclusively for that country, he co-starred with Adriana Salonia.

== Theatrical productions ==
- Autumn Garden (actor)
- Contractions (actor)
- For a yes or a no (actor)
- The puzzle bag (actor)
- Segovia (or De la poesía) (actor, directed by Villanueva Cosse)

== Selected filmography ==
- 1986 Another love story (or Orta historia de amor) as Jorge Castro
- 1991 The Last Harvest as Patrick
- 1992 ¿Dónde estás amor de mi vida que no te puedo encontrar? (or Where are you love of my life that I can not find you?) as Federico
- 1995 Más allá del límite (or Beyond the limit) as Inspector Bechara
- 1995 From my neighborhood with love as Julián
- 1996 The Salt in the Wound (or El Dedo en la llaga) as Irazábal
- 2001 Backlighted as Alejandro
- 2015 Pasaje de Vida (Passage of life) as Antonio

== Selected television ==
- 1978 Un mundo de veinte asientos (or 'A world of twenty seats') as Marcelo
- 1980 Trampa para un soñador (or 'Trap for a dreamer') as Jorge Luis
- 1985 Extraños y amantes (or 'Strangers and lovers') as Manuel Spil (TV series)
- 1989 El duende azul (or 'The Blue Goblin') as Marcelo
- 1992 Desde adentro as César Bermúdez
- 1994 Nano (or 'Elder brother') as Silvio Canelo
- 1996 Como pan caliente (or 'Like hot bread') as Horacio
- 1998-1999 Verano del '98 (or 'Endless Summer') as Germán Villanueva
- 2000 Vulnerable as Osvaldo
- 2001 Young Lovers as Arturo Miguens (telenovela)
- 2002 Sweethearts as Guillermo Carmona (telenovela)
- 2005 Una familia especial (or 'A special family') as Hermes Schneider
- 2006 Tango of the last love as George
- 2006 Monte Cristo as Horacio Díaz Herrera
- 2007 Son de Fierro as José María Fontana
- 2007 El hombre que volvió de la muerte (or 'The man who returned from death') as Blanco Morel (14 episodes)
- 2009 Champs 12 as Renzo Carresi (127 episodes)
- 2010 Ciega a citas as Augusto (TV Series)
- 2011 When you smile as Juan Primero Murfi (78 episodes)
- 2012 Graduates as Richi (3 episodes)
- 2013 Historias de corazón (or 'Heart stories') as Manuel (2 episodes)
- 2013 Los vecinos en guerra (or 'The neighbors in war') as Miguel Del Río (62 episodes)
- 2013 Farsantes as Miguel Ángel Mendoza (5 episodes)
- 2013 Qitapenas as Douglas Morris (4 episodes)
- 2016 Círculos (or 'Circles') as Don Federico
- 2017 Quiero vivir a tu lado (or'I want to live next to you') as Eugenio Justo (74 episodes)
- 2017 El Jardín de Bronce (or'The bronze garden') as Careers (8 episodes)
- 2018 100 días para enamorarse (or 'One hundred days to fall in love') as Miguel Contempomi

== Personnel life ==
He had been married to actress Marta Betoldi since 1992, they have two children (Manuel and Nicolás), they then separated in 2013. He likes macrobiotic food.

== Award nominations ==
- 2013 Martín Fierro Awards
  - Best secondary actor
