= Separadas =

Argentine telenovela

- Genre: Telenovela
- Created by: Marta Batoldi; Esteban del Campo
- Directed by: Martín Saban; Sebastián Pivotto
- Creative director: Mariana Sourrouille
- Starring: Agustina Cherri; Mariano Martinez; Celeste Cid; Marcela Kloosterboer; Mónica Antonópulos; Julieta Zylberberg; Gimena Accardi; Julieta Nair Calvo; Sebastián Estevanez; Maxi Iglesias; Ludovico Di Santo; Victorio D'Alessandro; Andrés Gil; Iair Said; Paula Grinszpan; Viviana Saccone
- Opening theme: "Separadas" by María Campos
- Country of origin: Argentina
- Original language: Spanish
- No. of seasons: 1
- No. of episodes: 35

Production
- Executive producer: Paula Granica
- Producer: Adrián Suar
- Production company: Pol-ka Producciones

Original release
- Network: El Trece
- Release: 20 January – 19 March 2020

Separadas is an Argentine telenovela produced by Pol-ka Producciones that premiered on 20 January 2020 on El Trece, and was ended abruptly on 19 March 2020. The series revolves around seven women who are affected, to different degrees, by a real estate fraud that plunges them into a deep crisis and leaves them on the brink of the abyss, and it stars an ensemble cast headed by Agustina Cherri, Celeste Cid, Marcela Kloosterboer, Mónica Antonópulos, Julieta Zylberberg, Gimena Accardi, Julieta Nair Calvo, along to Sebastián Estevanez, Maxi Iglesias, Ludovico Di Santo, Victorio D'Alessandro, Andrés Gil, Iair Said, Paula Grinszpan, and Viviana Saccone.

On 16 March 2020, El Trece confirmed that the telenovela would go off the air indefinitely, this following an order issued by the Argentine Association of Actors, due to the COVID-19 pandemic in Argentina, since the telenovela was still in the production process. On 12 May 2020, it was confirmed that the show was canceled and would not resume production.

== Cast ==
=== Main ===
- Agustina Cherri as Romina Baldi
- Mariano Martinez as Diego
- Marcela Kloosterboer as Luján Alcorta
- Celeste Cid as Martina Rivero
- Mónica Antonópulos as Clara Rivero
- Julieta Zylberberg as Paula Kaplan
- Gimena Accardi as Carolina Fernández
- Julieta Nair Calvo as Inés Fernández
- Sebastián Estevanez as Miguel Cardozo
- Maxi Iglesias as Felipe Iriarte / Francisco Azcurra
- Ludovico Di Santo as Pedro Moret
- Victorio D'Alessandro as Nicolás Alonso
- Andrés Gil as Andrés Saavedra
- Iair Said as Gabriel Morales
- Paula Grinszpan as Natalia
- Viviana Saccone as Renata Soria

=== Recurring ===
- Fabio Di Tomaso as Matias Santamaría
- Marco Antonio Caponi as Fausto Valdéz
- Laura Azcurra as Victoria Lorca
- Laura Laprida as Lena
- Tomás Benítez as Benicio Valdéz Rivero
- Nicolás Lorenzón as Sebastián Valdéz Rivero
- Connie Ballarini as Magui
- Mariano Saborido as Facundo
- Azul Araya as Roma Santamaría Kaplan
- Bruno Pedicone as Maxi
- Rodrigo Raffetto as Julian
- Clara Corrado as Camila Paloma Cardozo
- Gustavo Conti as Antonio
- Olivia Martínez as Micaela Osorio Lorca
- Romina Giardina as Vanesa
- Stephanie Petresky as Juana Vázquez
- Sofía Elliot as Lola
- Nicolás Pauls as David Cruciani
- Edgardo Moreira as Vega
- Pablo Seijo as Riccardi
- Reina Reech as Eva Alcorta
- Darío Barassi as Fabio
- Agustín Sierra as Franco
- Carla Quevedo as Emilia
