= Campeones de la vida =

- Genre: drama
- Created by: Adrián Suar
- Country of origin: Argentina
- Original language: Spanish
- No. of seasons: 2
- No. of episodes: 500

Campeones de la vida (Spanish: Champions of life) is an Argentine telenovela, produced by Pol-Ka, which was aired from 1999 to 2001 by El Trece. The main actors were Osvaldo Laport, María Valenzuela, Soledad Silveyra, Juan Carlos Calabró, Mariano Martínez, Jorgelina Aruzzi and Laura Azcurra. It received eight Martín Fierro awards.

== Description ==
The plot is focused around the relationship between two families through boxing. The D'Alessandros are two brothers with different jobs—while Ciro (Juan Carlos Calabró) works for a meat-packing company—his brother Tito (Osvaldo Santoro) intends to convince his nephew, Valentín (Mariano Martínez) to dedicate himself to boxing, which Tito is an instigator of. Valentín has a romantic relationship with Camila (Laura Azcurra), the daughter of his father's boss.

Other boxers that play a role in the story include Guido Gueverra (Osvaldo Laport), who wants to take back his prestige in the boxing world and maintain a loving relationship firstly with Betty (María Valenzuela), and then with Clara (Soledad Silveyra), a primary school teacher, whose son Federico (Facundo Espinosa) has problems with addiction.
