= Los Roldán =

Argentine Spanish language telenovela

Los Roldán is a Spanish language telenovela produced by Argentina's Telefe from 2004 to 2005. The drama, which is also described by many as a comedy, actually ended up winning an award in 2004 as Argentina's Comedy of the Year. RCN Colombian network bought the soap opera, making a Colombian version called Los Reyes, while the Mexican version of Los Roldán is Los Sánchez, produced by TV Azteca. In 2008, ANT1 Cyprus, produced the series in a Cypriot version called Η ζωή είναι ωραία (I zoi ine orea - Life is wonderful). In 2012, Mega Channel, produced the series in a Greek version called Οι Βασιλιάδες (I Vasiliades - The Kings).

== Synopsis ==
Tito Roldán was a humble local supermarket driver in Argentina's countryside, when, one day, an elderly woman showed up where he was fishing, apparently trying to commit suicide. She had been diagnosed with a deadly disease; although the word cancer was never mentioned in the soap opera, there were many indications that this is what she had. Tito saves the woman, Mercedes Lozada, and she in turn gifts him with a mansion she owned and with the presidency of her company.

When Roldán, his former girlfriend Yoli, and his close family (except his mother and one of his sisters) moved to the mansion, located in one of Buenos Aires' richest areas, they garnered the hate of many of their neighbors, particularly the Uriarte family, composed of Emilio Uriarte, his wife Chichita Banegas, and their son Facundo Uriarte. Part of the hate was generated because Emilio worked for the company headed by Mercedes Lozada and he wanted to be the company's president; when Tito Roldán basically appeared out of nowhere and became president, this infuriated Emilio. Added to this was that both Laisa Roldán (Tito"s transsexual sister) and Chichita Banegas were both television stars who considered themselves divas and were made to compete at the same time slot by their respective television channels.

To complicate things further, each member of the Uriarte family fell in love with a different member of the Roldán family, and their love was returned by their romantic interests. Emilio Uriarte, ignoring that Laiza Roldán used to be a man, fell in love with her; Laiza called him "mi hombre malo" ("my bad guy"). Chichita Banegas fell in love with Tito's son. Both Emilio and Chichita began adulterous relationships, which led them to talk about divorce, and about the possibility of a legal battle over their daughter's, a dog, custody. Since Facundo was over-age, there would be no battles over his custody. But, Facundo fell in love with a Roldán too, Tito's daughter Hilda, eventually marrying her.

At about the same time, Tito's mother returned from the countryside with her daughter. Since Laiza, who used to be Raúl Roldán, had her sex change operation after arriving at Buenos Aires, both she and Tito feared an emotional shock by their mother, so Laiza refused to tell her mother that she was, in fact, her daughter, posing instead as a friend of the Roldáns. Her mother knew Laiza was Raúl all along; she just pretended not to know, leading everyone else in her family to many situations where they thought that she had Alzheimer's disease. Laiza Roldán was played by a real life transsexual actor, Florencia De La V.

Meanwhile, Yoli and Tito reconciled and restarted their romantic relationship. Yoli. However, did not want to marry Tito because she knew that Cecilia was waiting to have Tito's child. Mercedes, who used to fly constantly between Paris and Buenos Aires, was told by her doctors that it was best for her to stay in Buenos Aires if she wanted to live longer, so she stayed in Argentina. Worried about the damage she was about to cause her beloved Tito, Cecilia decided to have the baby and let the Roldáns have the custody of the baby. She moved to Uruguay after having the baby, but every weekend flew to Buenos Aires to see her child. Tito and Yoli then married, with Yoli making her dream of becoming a mother a reality by caring for Cecilia's baby during the weekdays. Mercedes moved back to the Roldán mansion, and, as a result, both of Tito's mothers, his natural one and his adoptive one, lived under the same roof for the first time. They enjoyed a good friendship for the rest of Mercedes' life.

Chichita, who, by the way, was French, stayed with Tito's son. On the other hand, Emilio and his lawyer, Jean Paul, were jailed after being found guilty of fraud, but, since they were rich, they enjoyed privileges that most inmates cannot, such as their own private lavatories, private television sets and catering, clean, designer clothes, and other things. Even after Emilio found that Laiza used to be a man, he realized Laiza was his real love, and the two ended up together.

== Cast and characters ==
- Miguel Ángel Rodríguez-Tito Roldán
- Claribel Medina-Yoli Roldán
- Florencia De La V -Raúl/Laisa Roldán
- Lola Berthet-Hilda Roldán
- Facundo Espinosa-Leo Roldán
- Jimena Baron-Maria Roldán
- Facundo Aguilar-Maxi Roldán
- Gabriel Goity-Emilio Uriarte
- Andrea Bonelli-Chichita Banegas
- Tomas Fonzi-Facundo Uriarte
- Araceli Gonzalez-Florencia
- Bárbara Lombardo-Pilar Mancini
- China Zorrilla-Mercedes Lozada
- Andrea Frigerio-Cecilia
- Sofía Gala-Sofía Estévez
- Luciano Castro-Omar
- Jean Pierre Noher-Juan Pablo (Jean-Paul) Mancini
- Mariana Prommel-Dulciena
- Gastón Ricaud-Guido
- Ingrid Grudke-Andrea Raponi
- Coco Silly-Cacho Peletti
- Martin Campilongo-Jorge
- Luciana Salazar-Flavia
- Iván Gonzalez-Paco
- Juan Palomino-Alfredo
- Carolina Papaleo-Gabriela Cribeli
- Julieta Ortega-Luciana
- Silvina Luna-Sol
- Maria Eugenia Rito-Yanina
- Maria Rosa Fugazot-Rosa
- Arturo Bonin-Patricio Arizmendi
- Sandra Smith-Carmen
- Emanuel Ortega-Diego
- Horacio Cabak-Mike
- Dalma Maradona-Laurita
- Enrique Liporace-Varela
- Leandro Castello-Santiago
- Cecilia Rossetto-María Esther
- Mariano Torre-Guido

== Appearing as themselves ==
Because "Laiza Roldán" was a famous television personality, she had the opportunity to meet many celebrities in person, and, sometimes, take them home to meet her family.

This is a list of real life famous personalities that appeared in "Los Roldán", acting as themselves:

- Julio Iglesias
- Paulina Rubio
- Gastón Pauls
- Raúl Taibo
- Mariano Martínez
- Marcelo Tinelli
- Charly García
- Martin Pavlovsky
- Cacho Castaña
- Claudia Fontán
- Juanita Viale del Carril
- Maximiliano Ghione
- Ana María Picchio
- Mónica Gonzaga
- Claudia Albertario
- Michel Brown
- Palito Ortega
