= Lola Berthet =

Argentine actress (born 1977)

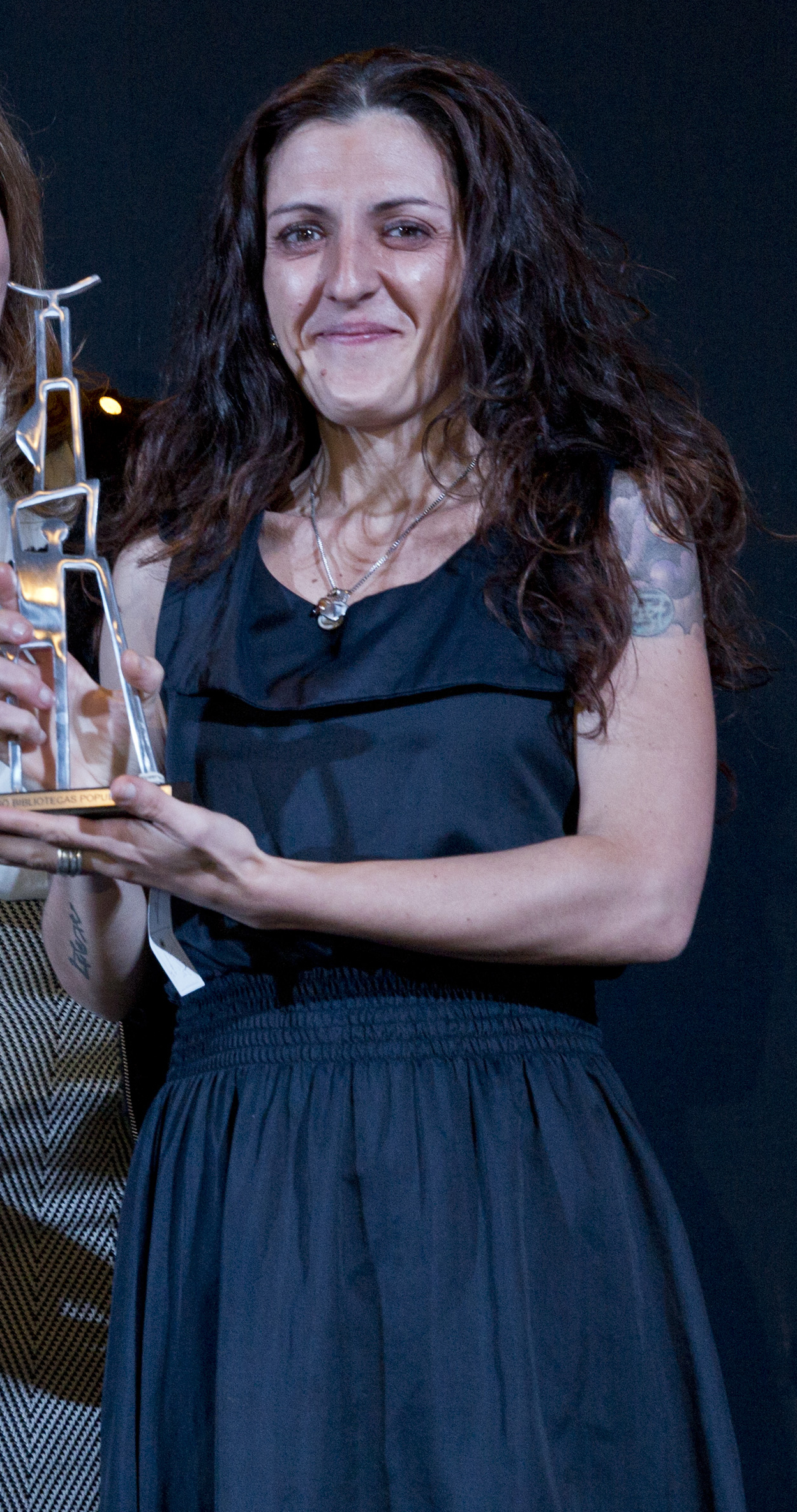
- Born: January 3, 1977 (age 49); Buenos Aires, Argentina
- Occupation: Actress
- Years active: 2000–present

Lola Berthet (born January 3, 1977) is an Argentine actress.

Berthet began acting at a young age, in her hometown of Buenos Aires, eventually becoming a well known telenovela actress in her home country as an adult. She made her first feature film, Nueces para el amor, in 2000. As of 2005, she has participated in five movies and produced one, Perro amarillo (2003).

Berthet became internationally famous in 2004, when she was chosen to participate in the major hit soap opera Los Roldán, alongside Miguel Ángel Rodríguez and Claribel Medina, among others. Her youthful looks (she played Rodríguez's teenage daughter), along with her experience as an actress helped her get chosen. Los Roldán became a hit in such places as Chile, Russia, and Hungary, making Berthet a well known actress in those countries as well as in the rest of Latin America.

Berthet is contractually attached to one of Argentina's main television networks, Telefé. In the 2007 telenovela, Lalola, she played the role of Soledad.

In 2013, Berthet is hired by Sebastián Ortega, to form part of Vecinos en Guerra, the new TV series to be aired by the channel Telefe.

== Filmography ==
- 2000: Endless Summer (TV Series, 1 episode)
- 2000: Illusions (TV Series)
- 2000: Nuts for Love
- 2000: The Road
- 2001: Déjala correr
- 2001: Las devotas (Kurzfilm)
- 2002: Un día de suerte
- 2002: ¿Y dónde está el bebé?
- 2003: Family Affairs (TV Series, 262 episodes)
- 2002-2003: Sweethearts (TV Series, 245 episodes)
- 2003: Puerto de Partida (Kurzfilm)
- 2004: Susana Giménez (TV Series, 2 episodes)
- 2004-2005: The Roldans (TV Series 2004–2005, 373 episodes)
- 2005: Perro amarillo
- 2007: Mujeres elefante (TV Movie)
- 2007-2008: Lalola (TV Series, 77 episodes)
- 2009: The Call
- 2009: All the Lonely People
- 2009: France
- 2010: The Hooker and the Transvestite Ep. 2 (Kurzfilm)
- 2009-2010: Botineras (TV Series, 63 episodes)
- 2010: Pájaros volando
- 2011: Sr. y Sra. Camas (TV Series, 108 episodes)
- 2011: Memory of the Dead
- 2013: Los vecinos en guerra (TV Series, 137 episodes)
- 2013: Historias de diván (TV Mini Series, 1 episode)
- 2013: Dos por una mentira (TV Mini Series 2013, 1 episode)
- 2014: 100 años de cine argentino (Kurzfilm)
- 2015: The Rotten Link
- 2020: El secretario (TV Series, 2 episodes)
- 2021: The Attachment Diaries
