= Osvaldo Laport =

Uruguayan actor

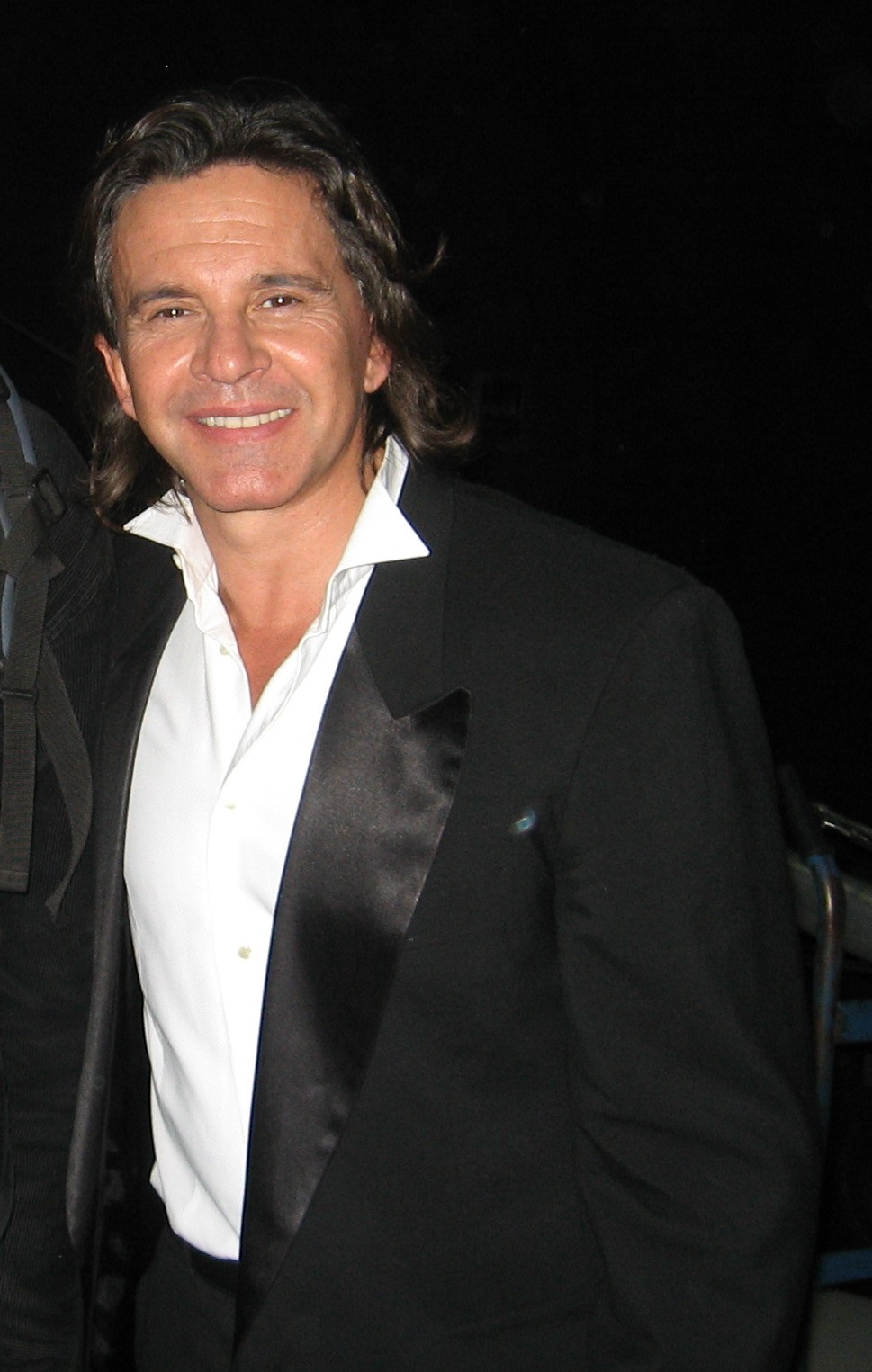
- Born: Rubens Osvaldo Jesús Udaquiola Laport; August 12, 1956 (age 69); Juan Lacaze, Uruguay
- Years active: 1983–present
- Spouse: Viviana Sáez (1980-present)
- Children: Jazmín
- Awards: Martin Fierro in 1999. Martin Fierro in 2005.
- Website: Osvaldo Laport

Rubens Osvaldo Jesús Udaquiola Laport (born August 12, 1956, in Juan Lacaze, Uruguay) is a Uruguayan-Argentine actor and UNHCR Goodwill Ambassador. In 2000, he earned Martín Fierro Award for his portrayal in television comedy Campeones de la Vida.

== Career ==
Osvaldo Laport was born in Juan Lacaze, Uruguay, from Rubens Sixto and Teresa Natividad. He worked at several casual jobs during his youth. His brother Luis Udaquiola was detained and tortured, suspected of being linked to the guerrilla group Tupamaros. He moved to Buenos Aires in 1976 and started to study drama at Luis Tasca's Drama School. In order to support his acting classes and pay his room in a hotel downtown he had to work in some jobs as clown, warehouse employee and bricklayer. In 1979, he met Viviana Sáez in the same school, whom he married the following year (they have one daughter, Jazmín, born in 1995).

Then, Osvaldo's drama teacher, Luis Tasca, called him for to work in the play Adiós Juventud. His acting performance got the attention of Santiago Doria, who offered him the leading role in Oscar Wilde's The Importance of Being Earnest, another important play in Argentina. In 1983, Luis Tasca supported Osvaldo again for him get a bit part in the soap opera Cara a Cara, starring Verónica Castro. His works in TV during the 1980s brought him success and in 1990 he was cast in a leading role opposite Jeanette Rodríguez in the remake of Pobre diabla.

The following year, he had his first work as a lead actor in Cosecharás Tu Siembra, with Luisa Kuliok. The role was initially meant for Víctor Laplace, who resigned. His major achievement was a Martin Fierro Award (1999/2000) as Best Actor in a Comedy for his performance as Guido Guevara in Campeones de la Vida.

In 2006, Laport became UNHCR Goodwill Ambassador.

He played Martín Fierro in the television sitcom Son de Fierro (2007–2008). Other than the name, the character has no relation with the famous Martín Fierro poem.

In 2009, Laport was the first Goodwill Ambassador to visit internally displaced camps and urban refugees in the Democratic Republic of Congo. The trip had an extensive coverage in the media and a prime-time TV documentary shown in Argentina and Uruguay.

== Filmography ==
=== Television ===
- Cara a Cara (1983) as Bruno
- Lucía Bonelli (1984) as Eduardo
- Duro Como la Roca... Frágil Como el Cristal (1985)
- Amor Prohibido (1986)
- Tu Mundo y el Mío (1987)
- Estrellita Mía (1987) as Miguel Ángel
- Ella Contra Mí (1988) as Roberto
- Pasiones (1988) as Juan
- Pobre diabla (1990) as Ariel Mejía Guzmán
- Cosecharás Tu Siembra (1991) as Luca Vanzini
- Más Allá del Horizonte (1994) as Catriel
- El día que me quieras (1994) as Lucho
- El Último Verano (1996) as Diego Morán
- 90-60-90 modelos (1996) as Martín Lescano
- Milady, la Historia Continúa (1997) as Federico De Valladares
- Susana Giménez (1998)
- Campeones de la Vida (1999) as Guido Guevara
- Franco Buenaventura, el Profe (2002) as Franco Buenaventura
- Soy Gitano (2003) as Amador Heredia
- Amor en Custodia (2005) as Juan Manuel Aguirre
- Brujas (2005) as Vicente Soler
- Collar De Esmeraldas (2006) as Martín Rivera
- Son de Fierro (2007–2008) as Martín Fierro

=== Film ===
- Maldita Cocaína - Cacería en Punta del Este (2001) as Danny Fusco
- Sólo un Ángel (2005) as Gonzalo Ruben

== Awards ==
- Martín Fierro Awards
  - 2000: Best Actor in Comedy (Campeones de la Vida) - Won
  - 2005: Best Actor in Comedy (Amor en custodia) - Won
  - 2006: Best Actor in telenovela (Collar de Esmeraldas) - Nominated
  - 2007: Best Actor in Comedy (Son de Fierro) - Nominated
  - 2013: Best actor of daily comedy (Mis amigos de siempre) - Nominated
