= R.R.D.T. =

Argentine television series

Rodolfo Rojas D.T. is a 1997-1998 Argentine telenovela, starring Carlos Calvo, China Zorrilla, Pepe Soriano and Patricia Sosa. It lasted for two seasons. Carlos Calvo plays the main character, Rodolfo Rojas, a football manager (D.T. is an acronym in Spanish for "Director técnico", a football manager). It got five nominations to the Martín Fierro award, all of them unsuccessful.
