= María Valenzuela =

Argentine actress (born 1956)

María del Carmen Valenzuela
- Born: June 16, 1956 (age 69); Buenos Aires, Argentina
- Spouse: Juan Carlos Mendizábal (1977-2002; div)
- Children: 3

María del Carmen Valenzuela (born June 16, 1956) is an Argentine actress. She has worked in several Argentine TV programs, mainly soap operas.

== Biography ==
Valenzuela played in many soap operas such as La cuñada, Vos y yo toda la vida, Barracas al sur, El infiel, El tema es el amor, Costumbres argentinas and Dulce Amor. She also appeared in some episodes of the TV program Alta comedia. She was married to the Argentine journalist Juan Carlos Mendizábal. She has three children with him. Mendizábal died of liver cancer in late 2011.
