= Facundo Arana =

Argentine actor and musician

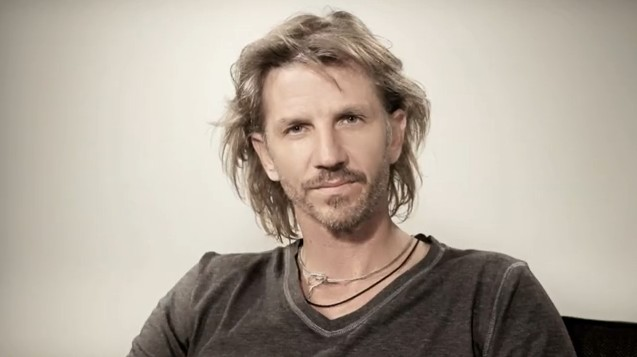
- Facundo Arana in 2015.
- Born: Jorge Facundo Arana Tagle; March 31, 1972 (age 53); Buenos Aires, Argentina
- Occupation(s): Actor and Musician
- Years active: 1993–present
- Height: 1.85 m (6 ft 1 in)
- Spouse: María Susini (m. 2012)
- Partner: Isabel Macedo (1996–2006)
- Children: 3
- Parent(s): Jorge Arana Tagle and Mathilde von Bernard

Jorge Facundo Arana Tagle (born March 31, 1972) is an Argentine actor and musician. He is the winner of various awards for television and theater in Argentina. Arana is also noted for his charity work.

== Biography ==
Facundo Arana was born in Buenos Aires, Argentina. He is the son of Dr. Jorge Arana Tagle, lawyer specializing in Maritime Law, and Mathilde von Bernard, athlete and former hockey player. He studied at the St Catherine´s Moorlands de Pilar school. At 17 he was diagnosed with cancer called Hodgkin's disease, a malignancy of the lymphoid tissue that is located in the lymph nodes, spleen, liver and bone marrow. He spent 11 months of chemotherapy and radiotherapy and five years of controls when he was finally declared cancer-free. In November 2010, Facundo Arana summited at Aconcagua intending to raise awareness about blood donation and placed a flag on top of the “coloso de América” in commemoration of the 96th anniversary of the first blood transfusion in the country. In 2012 Facundo Arana came to try to climb Everest: 8,848 meters above sea level, in the middle of the Himalayas, to raise public awareness about the importance of solidarity and donating blood. During his journey, he was evacuated urgently for a respiratory problem and had to abandon the ascent to Everest. On May 23, 2016, at 11.50 local time of Nepal, he summited on Mount Everest.

== Personal life ==
He had a relationship with the actress Isabel Macedo for ten years. Since 2007, he has a relationship with the model, María Susini with whom he has three children, India Arana Tagle, Yaco Arana Tagle and León Moro Arana Tagle. They got married on December 20, 2012.

== Career ==
=== 1990s ===
Facundo Arana started on Canal 9 in Alta comedia, Marco, el candidato, La hermana mayor and El Rafa. In 1997 his first important work would arrive, playing Alejo Méndez Ayala in the hit children's series of Cris Morena Chiquititas, in his first year of participation, he played the villain of the series and, the following year, in 1998, he became the heartthrob of the series, falling in love with the protagonist, played by Romina Yan. At the end of 1998 and during 1999 he participated in Muñeca Brava. Some of these series were successes not only in Argentina but also in countries like Russia, Israel, Romania, Poland and much of Latin America so that Facundo Arana gained international fame. In Israel he received the Viva! Award for Best Actor.

=== Decade of 2000 ===
In 2000 he was the co-star of the comedy Buenos vecinos, where he acted alongside Hugo Arana, Moria Casán and Malena Solda. In 2001 he made his film debut starring alongside Romina Yan, Chiquititas: Rincón de luz, a film of the successful children's saga that had them as protagonists. He also participates in the film La fuga. His next protagonist was in the soap opera Yago, pasión morena with Gianella Neyra in the afternoon of Telefe, for which he obtained his first Martín Fierro Award for Best Leading Telenovela Actor. Under the production of Pol-ka, he stars in 2002 soap opera 099 Central, next to Nancy Dupláa on the screen of Canal 13. He was awarded a second time with the Martín Fierro Award for Best Telenovela Actor. In 2004 he starred again with Nancy Dupláa, marking the return of one of the most successful television duo. The soap opera Padre Coraje, with production of Pol-ka, on the screen of Canal 13. He receives his third Martín Fierro Award for Best Actor. He also received the award for Best Actor in the Festival y Mercado de la Telenovela Iberoamericana. In 2005 he starred in theater, along with Pepe Soriano, the play Visitando al Sr. Green. For his work, he obtained the ACE Award and Florencio Sánchez Award as Theater Revelation. In 2006 he starred a new soap opera by Pol-Ka, Sos mi vidaThe fiction became the most-watched of the year 2006 in Argentina and was transmitted internationally by different chains, having great success in Eastern Europe and the Middle East. Together with Betiana Blum and China Zorrilla, he stars in the film Tocar el cielo. Between 2007 and 2008 he starred in the play Codicia. In 2008 he signed a contract with Telefe to star in the soap opera Vidas robadas. Fiction was highly praised for dealing with topics such as the white.

=== 2010s ===
In 2010 he returns to the cinema starring in the independent film El agua del fin del mundo. In 2011 he returns to the small screen, starring alongside Julieta Díaz the soap opera Cuando me sonreís, a production of RGB producer of Gustavo Yankelevich. In it he interprets the character of Gastón Armando Murfi. That year he made a documentary titled Donar sangre salva vidas, issued by Canal Encuentro. Go back to the theater in the summer of 2012 and 2013, starring in Mar Del Plata the work En el aire. From 2013 to 2014 he was one of the protagonists of the series Farsantes, alongside Julio Chávez, Benjamín Vicuña and Alfredo Casero. At the end of 2014, and until mid-2015 he starred alongside Romina Gaetani the soap opera Noche y día, by Canal 13. In 2016 he returns to the theater with the play En el aire, filled the room of Tabarís and it was months in billboard. In September he gave a recital in La Trastienda Club with his band Facundo Arana & The Blue Light Orquestra, presented his second album "EN EL AIRE". In 2017 he made presentations in several provinces with En el aire, in the middle of the year he premiered in theater Los Puentes de Madison at Paseo La Plaza with Araceli González, which in 2018 led to Mar del Plata. During that year he debuted as a singer with his solo album Salir a tocar with jazz and blues rhythms. The first single from the album was the cover of Ben E. King's "Stand by Me".

== Solidarity work ==
The last years Facundo Arana has devoted his life and most of his work to solidarity causes. Being appointed as Ambassador of the Fundaleu foundation he participates in all of its campaigns, while he has been the face or participated in several other foundation's campaigns such as UNICEF. He is the founder of "Donar Sangre Salva Vidas" campaign for which he has filmed two documentaries and supports it consecutively. He also has moved his acting career towards this target, with Vidas robadas and Poder se puede with which he traveled in the most isolated parts of Argentina. In 2012 he became the "Godfather" of the first university for indigenous students of Abra Pampa in Jujuy Province.

== Filmography ==
=== Television ===
| Year | Title | Character | Channel |
|---|---|---|---|
| 1993 | Canto rodado | Ramiro Ríos | Canal 13 |
| 1993 | La flaca escopeta | Facundo | Canal 9 |
| 1994-1995 | Alta comedia | | Canal 9 |
| 1994 | Marco, el candidato | Willy Cassirone | Canal 9 |
| 1995 | Perla negra | Leonardo Bastides | Telefe |
| 1996 | Montaña rusa, otra vuelta | Willy | Canal 13 |
| 1996 | Zíngara | Rodolfo "Ruddy" Moretti | Telefe |
| 1997 | El Rafa | | Telefe |
| 1997-1998 | Chiquititas | Alejo Méndez Ayala/Manuel Méndez Ayala | Telefe |
| 1998-1999 | Muñeca Brava | Ivo Di Carlo/Ivo Miranda | Telefe |
| 1999-2001 | Buenos vecinos | Diego Pinillos | Telefe |
| 2000 | Tiempo final | Pablo | Telefe |
| 2001 | Yago, pasión morena | Yago Valdéz/Fabio Sirenio | Telefe |
| 2002 | 099 Central | Tomás Rodolfo Ledesma | Canal 13 |
| 2003 | Durmiendo con mi jefe | Swede | Canal 13 |
| 2004 | Padre Coraje | Coraje/Padre Juan/Gabriel Jaúregui/Peregrino Esposito | Canal 13 |
| 2005 | Una familia especial | Exterminator | Canal 13 |
| 2006-2007 | Sos mi vida | Martín Quesada | Canal 13 |
| 2008 | Vidas robadas | Bautista Amaya | Telefe |
| 2011 | Cuando me sonreís | Gastón Armando Murfi | Telefe |
| 2013-2014 | Farsantes | Alberto "Beto" Marini | Canal 13 |
| 2014-2015 | Noche y día | Victorio "Vico" Villa | Canal 13 |
| 2017 | Quiero vivir a tu lado | Víctor Lorenzeti | Canal 13 |
| 2019 | Pequeña Victoria | Antonio Tiscornia | Telefe |
| 2023 | Buenos Chicos | Rocco Guzmán | Canal 13 |

=== Theater ===
| Year | Title | Character |
|---|---|---|
| 1998 | Chiquititas | Alejo Méndez Ayala |
| 2005 | Visitando al Sr. Green | Ross Gardiner |
| 2007-2008 | Codicia | Richard Roma |
| 2009-2010 | Poder se puede | Damián |
| 2012-2013 | En el aire | |
| 2017-2018 | Los puentes de Madison | Robert Kincaid |
| 2019 | Cartas de amor | Andrew Mekepeace |
| 2022-2023 | Los 39 Escalones | Richard Hannay |

=== Movies ===
| Year | Movie | Character | Director |
|---|---|---|---|
| 2001 | Chiquititas: Rincón de luz | Alejo Méndez Ayala | José Luis Massa |
| 2001 | La Fuga | Víctor Gans | Eduardo Mignogna |
| 2007 | Tocar el cielo | Santiago | Marcos Carnevale |
| 2010 | El agua del fin del mundo | Martín | |
| 2015 | Adiós, querido Pep | Mauro | |
| 2017 | YOn My Space | YOn | |

=== Television Programs ===
| Year | Program | Channel | Notes |
|---|---|---|---|
| 2012 | Expedición Everest | Telefe | Host |
| 2018 | #Vive Ro: noche de sueños | Telefe | Himself |
| 2023 | ¿Quién es la máscara? | Teledoce | Participant |

== Discography ==
Discography
| Year | Title | Notes and Awards |
|---|---|---|
| 1998 | Chiquititas vol 4 | |
| 2014 | Salir a tocar | |
| 2016 | En el aire | |

== Awards and nominations ==
| Year | Award | Category | Work | Result |
|---|---|---|---|---|
| 2002 | Martín Fierro Awards | Best Actor Protagonist of the Novel | Yago, pasión morena | Winner |
| 2003 | Martín Fierro Awards | Best Actor Protagonist of the Novel | 099 Central | Winner |
| 2005 | Martín Fierro Awards | Best Actor Protagonist of the Novel | Padre Coraje | Winner |
| 2007 | Martín Fierro Awards | Best Actor in Comedy | Sos mi vida | Winner |
| 2008 | Martín Fierro Awards | Best Actor in Comedy | Sos mi vida | Nominated |
| 2009 | Martín Fierro Awards | Best Actor Protagonist of the Novel | Vidas robadas | Nominated |
| 2011 | Martín Fierro Awards | Best Service Program | Poder se puede | Winner |
| 2012 | Martín Fierro Awards | Best Actor in Comedy | Cuando me sonreís | Nominated |
| 2012 | Martín Fierro Awards | Best Documentary | Donar Sangre Salva Vidas | Winner |
| 2014 | Martín Fierro Awards | Best Actor Protagonist of the Novel | Farsantes | Nominated |

== See also ==
- List of Argentines
