= Valientes =

- Clockwise from top left: Segundo (Mariano Martínez), Leonardo (Luciano Castro), Enzo (Gonzalo Heredia), Juana (Eleonora Wexler), Alma (Julieta Díaz) and Isabel (Marcela Kloosterboer)
- Genre: Telenovela
- Created by: Adrián Suar
- Developed by: Pol-Ka
- Written by: Marcos Carnevale; Lily Ann Martin
- Opening theme: Volver
- Ending theme: Volver
- Composer: Ricardo Montaner
- Country of origin: Argentina
- Original language: Spanish
- No. of seasons: 1
- No. of episodes: 218

Original release
- Network: Canal 13
- Release: February 9, 2009 – February 24, 2010

Related
- Por amor a vos; Alguien que me quiera

Valientes (in Spanish, "The braves") is a Argentine telenovela, which was aired by Canal 13 at prime time, and produced by Pol-Ka. It starred Luciano Castro, Julieta Díaz and Arnaldo André, and was one of the most successful Argentine television programs of 2009. With a daily rating of nearly 27,4 points, it is the most successful production of Pol-Ka. It run from February 2009 to 2010. From April 16, 2010, the show was airing in Slovakia on JOJ Plus, but due to poor ratings, it was cancelled after forty-eight episodes. The rest of the episodes then started broadcasting on JOJ Plus from March 6, 2012 at 4 AM.

== Premise ==
The main idea of the telenovela is a plot of revenge by three brothers who used to live in the countryside, whose father was ruined by a businessman who took his farms. For this purpose they move to Buenos Aires and work near him, in order to become his friends and confidants, and avenge his father by sabotaging his political career. The love stories of the show torn the characters between their sentiments and their loyalty to the plan.

The series replaced Por amor a vos on Channel 13 and was aired in the same time segment than the soap-opera Los exitosos Pells of Telefe. The idea was to confront the humoristic style of the later with a melodramatic telenovela. The dramatic tone of the series allowed a strong success among the male audiences, a rare event among Argentine telenovelas, which led to the high success of the program in audiences.

The success of the series led to a spin-off theater play by the main actors, reprising the characters from the TV but inside a humoristic story.

The ending of the series was followed by a "behind the scenes" production and a rerun of the last episodes. It was replaced by the soap opera Alguien que me quiera, of a less dramatic nature, but it didn't have much success. As a result, and attempting to keep the audience of Valientes, Alguien que me quiera was scheduled to another hour, and another series was created, Malparida. Heredia also works in this one, and it is also a story of revenge. Luciano Castro would also join Malparida some time afterwards.

== Plot ==
The story started by events set in the past, when the landlord Laureano Gomez Acuña tricks Roque Sosa, his employee in his farm, into giving him the lands he intended to inherit to his sons. His wife Elisa Sosa is blackmailed to leave the country, and the 3 sons of Roque are sent to different locations. Roque Sosa dies shortly after. The main character of the story is Leonardo Sosa, one of the lost sons of Roque Sosa, who discovers the truth in his adulthood and intends to get revenge on Laureano. For this he locates his two brothers, Segundo and Enzo. Segundo was living at another farm and held under harsh conditions by his tutor, while Enzo was a criminal held in prison. Both of them are freed from those places by Leo, who designs new identities for themselves as Leonardo, Segundo and Enzo Morales. Then they install a car repair shop next to Laureano's home, with the intention of becoming known and gaining confident with him, and then be capable to disrupt his business and political career.

Leonardo soon discovers that Alma is his childhood girlfriend, but he can't tell her his identity because she has confidence in Laureano. He later found out that Laureano's daughter Juana had fallen in love with him and stayed with her to increase his trust in Laureano. However, Juana is very jealous of Alma and keeps attacking her and complaining to Leo. To avoid the risk of him leaving her, she falsely claimed that she was pregnant, and quickly after Juana and Leo get married.

The Sosa took advantage of the new filial relation of Leo and Laureano to keep disrupting his activities, while Laureano ignored who was opposing him. Married to Juana, but still loving Alma, Leo contacts her by internet as Leonardo Sosa and chats with her, while pretending to be in another country. When Alma requested to see him with a webcam, he requested Nicolás Ortega, an old friend from the Police, to chat with her posing as Leonardo Sosa, but it turned out against him when Ortega actually falls in love with Alma. However, when Laureano learns that Alma was dating Leonardo Sosa (ignoring as her the deception being done), he kidnaps and tortures him to death. When the kidnapping took place Nicolas's wallet was left behind, and with it Alma learns that he wasn't really Leonardo Sosa.

Incapable of maintaining the lie of being pregnant, Juana sets up a situation to blame Alma of making her lost her pregnancy, but when Leo discovers the whole lie he lefts Juana, regardless of the plan. Alma was with Patricio by then, a new character added to the story, but reunites with Leo. By the time Alma learns about Leonardo and Ortega being friends, Leo tells her the whole truth, including his real identity and the plan to harm Laureano. In the meantime, Juana was hospitalized and later gets amnesia during an accident. She recovers her memory a while afterwards, but did not say so because of being better treated by others when they thought she did not remember past crimes.

Two new characters are added to the story. Andy, a step-sister of Leo, joins the car repair shop, and Leo makes her a part of the plan immediately. Elisa Sosa, mother of Sosa brothers, is revealed to have faked her death, and while staying hidden from Laureano she was searching for her sons. She took part in a painting contest with her son, Enzo, but neither of them realized their relation because of using pseudonyms.

== Cast ==
- Luciano Castro as Leonardo Morales-Leonardo Sosa
- Julieta Díaz as Alma Varela
- Mariano Martínez as Segundo Sosa/Morales
- Marcela Kloosterboer as Isabel Gomez Acuña
- Gonzalo Heredia as Enzo Sosa/Morales
- Eleonora Wexler as Juana Gomez Acuña †
- Arnaldo Andre as Laureano Gomez Acuña
- Betiana Blum as Argentina Varela
- Marita Ballesteros as Mona Gomez Acuña
- Guillermo Piefning as Benjamin Gomez Acuña
- Graciela Tenembaum as Maxima
- Alejandro Muller as José "Huevo" Vélez
- Roberto Vallejos as Omar
- Jorge Sassi as Heriberto Marcelino Montefusco †

== Awards ==
The series won the Martín Fierro Awards to best telenovela, new actor (Alejandro Muller), secondary drama actor (Antonio Grimau), telenovela main actor (Arnaldo André) and telenovela main actress (Eleonora Wexler).

== Spanish version ==
There is a Spanish version that was broadcast by Cuatro from January 25, 2010 to February 25, 2010 and cancelled due to low ratings. It starred Julián Gil, Marco de Paula, Michel Gurfi and Marta Belmonte. The soundtrack was composed and sung by Ruth Lorenzo.
