= Solamente vos =

- Juan Cousteau (Adrián Suar) and Aurora Andrés (Natalia Oreiro)
- Genre: Telenovela; Romantic comedy
- Created by: Adrián Suar
- Written by: Lily Ann Martin; Marta Betoldi; Daniel Cúparo
- Directed by: Claudio Ferrari; Rodolfo Antúnez
- Starring: Adrián Suar; Natalia Oreiro; Muriel Santa Ana; Claudia Fontán; Juan Minujín; Mariana Espósito; María Eugenia Suárez; Ana María Picchio; Arturo Puig; Alberto Martín
- Theme music composer: Coti Sorokin
- Opening theme: Solamente vos
- Country of origin: Argentina
- Original language: Spanish
- No. of seasons: 1
- No. of episodes: 223

Production
- Executive producer: Adrián González
- Producer: Pol-ka
- Production location: Buenos Aires
- Running time: 75 minutes

Original release
- Network: Canal 13
- Release: 21 January 2013 – 20 January 2014

Related
- Sos mi hombre; Farsantes

Solamente vos (Spanish for: Only you) is a 2013 Argentine Romantic comedy starring Adrián Suar and Natalia Oreiro, produced by Pol-ka that began to be aired on 21 January 2013, and ended 20 January 2014 from Monday to Thursday at 9:30 pm on the screen of Canal 13 as of 28 June, it also began airing on Fridays at 9:30 pm.

== Plot ==
The main characters are Juan Cousteau and Aurora Andrés. Juan is a music director of a chamber orchestra, and works at a records label with his best friend Félix Month (both of them members of a glam metal band in their youth). Félix is married to Michelle, owner of the records label, but he cheats her with the hairdresser Aurora Andrés. Juan is married with Ingrid, "la polaca", who asked a temporary separation; Juan left the house and moved to the apartment next to Aurora. The separation of Juan and Ingrid generated several crisis with their 5 children.

Aurora did not trust Félix very much, as he did not initially mention that he was married, delayed in separating from Michelle, and discovered him lying and cheating her at several times. She also had a growing love for Juan. Félix finally separated from Michelle and asked Aurora for marriage. She accepted, but still had doubts about him, and escaped from the wedding. Félix got amnesia in an accident, which was exploited by Michelle to keep him as her husband.

Juan and Aurora began a romance, which was resisted by Juan's family. He tried to rebuild the relation with Ingrid at the request of their daughter Mora, who was about to die at the time; the whole family moved to his apartment. Both Aurora and Ingrid got pregnant of Juan at the same time; Aurora did not mention it when she heard Ingrid say it first. Ingrid was informed afterwards that she was not pregnant, that the laboratory made a mistake, but carried on with the pretense of being pregnant anyway. Still, Aurora dropped her lover Segundo and revealed Juan his fatherhood, who openly cheated Ingrid with her. Ingrid finally left the apartment and returned to the original house, and announced that she lost the pregnancy. The kids moved with her, Juan moved to Aurora's house, and his sister Denise moved to his apartment. Both of them finally moved to a new house in Pilar.

== Premise ==
Solamente vos is a romantic comedy with elements of sitcoms. It features the returns to television of Natalia Oreiro and Adrián Suar. The 2012 telenovelas of Pol-ka had low rating points against the productions of the rival channel Telefe, such as Graduados, La Dueña and Dulce amor. However, Suar pointed that the program was not written with the premise of reverting that tendency, and that he had already begun drafting it with the writers a year before.

Adrián Suar began his career as an actor, but soon changed to producer, and his group Pol-ka produced several telenovelas. He resumed his work as an actor in recent years, in films such as Un novio para mi mujer, Igualita a mí and Dos más dos, and theater plays such as El año que viene en el mismo lugar and La guerra de los Roses. Suar considers that those works have improved his acting performance. Natalia Oreiro modified her visual appearance for the telenovela, as she usually does for each new work: she dyed her hair with black color and sported a long fringe.

Another actor that returned to television was Arturo Puig, who starred the success Grande, pá! in the 1990s. He was initially reluctant to do so, and intended to work just in guest appearances. Adrián Suar convinced him to be a steady part of the cast by pointing that he would play a gay character who had just came out of the closet.

== Production ==
The filming of the telenovela began on 3 December 2012, at the Villa Devoto and Villa Pueyrredón neighbourhoods. The scripts were written by Mario Segade, Lily Ann Martin, Marta Betoldi and Daniel Cúparo, and the directors were Claudio Ferrari and Rodolfo Antúnez. The program includes several guest appearances of musicians or music bands, who make a short clip with one of their songs singing along with the characters. Those clips are used to lower the tone when the plot becomes too dramatic. The first musician who worked in the telenovela with this format was David Bisbal, other musicians that appeared later were Carlos Vives, Alejandro Lerner, Patricia Sosa, Cristian Castro Carlos Alfredo Elías, Los Pimpinela and Agapornis. The final episode included a clip by Coti Soroin who made the open theme of the program. Pablo Codevilla, a former actor who works now as a content manager of El Trece, made a brief cameo as a dentist. His appearance included metafictional references, and a deliberate similarity with a contemporary advertisement. He appeared again at the final episode. Juana Viale, the lead actress of Malparida, stayed for a time as the villain of the telenovela. Diego Ramos, who had worked with Natalia Oreiro in 90-60-90 Modelos and Ricos y Famosos, joined the cast in July. The program included as well an in-universe participation of the characters in the A todo o nada game show, which was also aired by El Trece in 2013. The show host Guido Kaczka appeared in the program, playing himself in the fiction.

== Reception ==
The 2013 prime time of Argentine television was highly disputed by the channels El Trece and Telefe. El Trece aired Solamente Vos and Farsantes, and Telefe aired Los Vecinos en Guerra and Celebrity Splash!, both channels with similar ratings. The weekly series Aliados, first aired on 26 June, did not break the tie between the channels. Although it is one of the most watched Argentine productions of 2013, the rating is very low in comparison with productions of previous years. This is caused by a general decline in the rating of public TV channels, as people migrate to private cable channels, or to watch TV in internet. Solamente Vos eventually became the 2013 fiction with the highest rating in Argentina, and had 13 rating points at the ending episode. The character "la polaca", played by the actress Muriel Santa Ana, is highly controversial among the fans of the telenovela. She is a manipulative ex-wife trying to seduce her former husband and rebuild the family. She is not a classic telenovela villain, and many fans that faced a similar situation in real life praise the realism of the character. Other fans follow the regular tradition of supporting the heroes, in this case the couple Juan-Aurora. Santa Ana also provides the character with redeemable aspects.

=== Awards ===
- Tato Awards
  - Best secondary actress (Muriel Santa Ana)
  - Best secondary actor (Juan Minujín)
  - Best lead actress in comedy (Natalia Oreiro)
  - Best lead actor in comedy (Adrián Suar)
  - Best daily comedy
- 2013 Martín Fierro Awards
  - Best daily telecomedy
  - Best daily actor in comedy (Adrián Suar)
  - Best actress of daily comedy (Natalia Oreiro)

=== Nominations ===
- 2013 Martín Fierro Awards
  - Best secondary actor (Arturo Puig, Juan Minujín and Lito Cruz)
  - Best new actor or actress (Lola Poggio)
  - Best scripts
  - Best director
  - Best opening theme

== Cast ==
- Adrián Suar as Juan Cousteau
- Natalia Oreiro as Aurora Andrés
- Muriel Santa Ana as Ingrid "La Polaca" Albarracín de Cousteau
- María Eugenia Suárez as Julieta Cousteau Albarracín
- Mariana Espósito as Daniela Cousteau Albarracín
- Ángela Torres as Mora Cousteau Albarracín
- Arturo Puig as Lautaro Cousteau
- Juan Minujín as Félix Month
- Coraje Ábalos as Nacho Molina Montes
- Nicolás Vázquez as Facundo Irazábal
- Diego Ramos as Segundo Benson
- Claudia Fontán as Michelle
- Ana María Picchio as Rosita
- Fabiana García Lago as Dalia
- Benjamín Rojas as Federico
- Gustavo Guillén as Gastón
- Zulma Faiad as Miriam
- Victoria Onetto as Susana
- Luisa Kuliok as Rosario
- Josefina Scaglione as Leila
- Henny Trayles as Sara
- Ricardo Morán as Aníbal
- Ramiro Fumazoni as Iván
- Gimena Accardi as Candela
- Karina Jelinek as Carola
- Gustavo Conti as Gustavo
- Marcelo Tinelli as himself
- Joaquín Flamini as Eugenio Cousteau Albarracín
- Lola Poggio as Lucía "Luli" Cousteau Albarracín
- Alberto Martín as Orlando Andrés
- Marina Bellati as Denise Cousteau
- Peto Menahem as Rogelio Belvedere
- Sebastián Wainraich as Leopoldo Fishman
- Juana Viale as Victoria O'Connor
- Rafael Ferro as Rodrigo Perazzo
- Dan Breitman as Sam Noriega
- Luisa Albinoni as Nelida "Frenchi" Garrido
- Laura Cymer as Sharon
- Marcelo de Bellis as Miguel
- Graciela Tenenbaum as Mirna
- Federico Ottone as Rubio
- Paula Baldini as Nani
- Thiago Batistuta as Sebastián
- Laura Laprida as Florencia
- Angel Bonanni as Boris
- María Fernanda Callejón as Graciela
- Álvaro Teruel as Lucas
- Macarena Paz as Mauge
- Omar Calicchio as Hugo
- Julieta Cajg as Carolina
- Lucila Viggiano as Delfina
- Andrea Rincón as Dalila
- Paula Kohan as Paula
- Manuel Ramos as Lucas
- Mariana Richaudeau as Diana
- Germán Tripel as Rolo
- Emiliano Lobo as Julián
- Selva Alemán as Beba
- Miguel Ángel Rodríguez as Coco
- Matías Santoianni as Pato
- Julieta Fazzari as Diana
- Agustina Posse as Pamela
- Matías Apostolo as Sergio
- Gadiel Sztryk as Hans
- Renato Quattordio as Franco
- René Bertrand as Marcelo
