= Malparida =

- Also known as: Entre El Odio y El Amor
- Genre: Telenovela
- Created by: Adrián Suar
- Written by: Lily Ann Martin; Pablo Junovich; Cecilia Guerty
- Directed by: Jorge Nisco; Jorge Bechara
- Starring: Gonzalo Heredia; Juana Viale; Carina Zampini; Selva Alemán; Raúl Taibo
- Opening theme: Malparida by Carlos Matari (Argentina) "Sana" by Vina Morales (Philippines)
- Composer: Carlos Matari
- Country of origin: Argentina
- Original language: Spanish
- No. of seasons: 1
- No. of episodes: 175

Production
- Production company: Pol-ka Producciones

Original release
- Network: Canal 13
- Release: April 20, 2010 – February 8, 2011

Related
- Alguien que me quiera; Herederos de una venganza; La Traicionera

Malparida (The Wicked Girl) is a 2010 Argentine telenovela aired by Channel 13 in the prime time. It ran from April 2010 to February 2011. It is protagonized antagonistically by Renata (played by Juana Viale), a cold and scheming woman seeking revenge against a man that had caused the death of her mother. The term "Malparida" (Misbegotten) denotes in Spanish a woman of questionable reputation.

== Creation ==
Channel 13 had great success in 2009 with Valientes, a Primetime Soap Opera with a vengeance plot and a dramatic genre. After it ended, Alguien que me quiera, a comedy, took over the prime time but didn't achieve the same success. Shortly after, it was rescheduled and the prime time was given to a new dramatic soap opera called Malparida. Gonzalo Heredia, one of the main actors of Valientes, was chosen in one of the leading roles along with Juana Viale and Raúl Taibo.

The character Gracia, played by Selva Alemman, makes constant references to the pagan cult of San La Muerte.

The autistic character, Manu, played by Joaquín Wang took part in the script design because the scripts were still at a developing stage when he was hired.

== Plot ==
Twenty years ago, Lorenzo Uribe discovered true love with Maria Herrera and began a romance. Lorenzo was rich, married, and had a young son: Lautaro. Maria was poor and unknown to Lorenzo, had a daughter called Renata. Maria's mother, Gracia, wanted her daughter to catch this rich man at all costs and convinced her that pregnancy would assure this. But before she could tell him, Uribe was pressured by his father to respect his obligations and regretfully ended the romance. He never knew that Maria gave birth to a child of his, an autistic son called Manu. Gracia drove her already depressed and heartbroken daughter Maria to commit suicide, and ended up raising Renata, teaching her to hate Lorenzo and blame him for Maria's death. The story begins when Renata decides to take revenge on Lorenzo. Her mission was to seduce him, get him madly in love with her, leave him and watch him die of love. However, she didn't count on falling in love with Lautaro nor did she know of Lorenzo's dangerous brother, the Admiral.

== Cast ==
- Juana Viale as Renata Medina
- Gonzalo Heredia as Lautaro Uribe
- Raúl Taibo as Lorenzo Uribe
- Carina Zampini as Martina Figueroa
- Selva Alemán as Gracia Herrera
- Gabriel Corrado as Eduardo Uribe
- Luciano Castro as Lucas Carballo
- Alejandro Muller as Lino
- Patricia Viggiano as Nina Uribe
- Fabiana García Lago as Esmeralda Espesa
- Esteban Pérez Villano as Hernán Ímola
- Mónica Villa as Olga Domisi
- Mónica Galán as Marcia Ímola
- Brenda Gandini as Bárbara Castro
- Gastón Grande as Moro
- Gabriela Sari as Vanesa Ramírez
- Gerardo Chendo as Marcelo
- Roberto Monzo as Abel Giménez
- Lucio Rogatti as Germán
- Luciana Lifschitz as Esther Lipman
- Mariano Argento as Hugo Troncaro
- Mónica Cabrera as Mabel Díaz
- Joaquin Wang as Manuel "Manu" Herrera / Manuel "Manu" Herrera Uribe
- Marina Belatti as Noelia Albarracín
- Umbra Colombo as Maria Herrera
- Florencia Raggi as Lara Balpadossi
- Daniel Lemes Daniel Carballo
- Fernando Alvarez as Molina
- Pablo Cedrón as Felipe Medina
- Pablo Quaglia as Armando Manzano
- Jorge Nolasco as Emiliano Brasenas
- Ivo Cutzarida as Andrés Soriano
- Mary Esquivel as Cristina Granata
- Graciela Pal as Cachita
- Carlos Mastrángelo as Dino Mascardi
- Boris Bakst as Sebastián Castro
- Héctor Calori as Gutierrez
- Fabián Rendo as Forense Lapuente

== Deaths ==
- Nina Uribe (episode 21) - killed by Renata.
- Daniel Carballo (episode 22) - killed by Renata.
- Lucas Carballo (episode 43) - killed by Renata.
- Manuel Herrera (episode 65) - dies in a traffic accident.
- Lara Balpadossi (episode 67) - killed by Renata.
- Felipe Medina (episode 76) - killed by Renata.
- Dino Mascardi (episode 96) - killed by Brazenas.
- Emiliano Brazenas (episode 109) - killed by Eduardo.
- Sebastian Castro (episode 112) - killed by Soriano.
- Marcelo (episode 126) - killed by Gracia.
- Cachita (episode 129) - dies in a traffic accident.
- Molina (episode 129) - killed by Lorenzo.
- Martina Figueroa (episode 132) - killed by Renata.
- Cristina Agranato (episode 135) - killed by Soriano.
- Lino (episode 140) - killed by Armando
- Forense Lapuente (episode 157) - killed by Soriano
- Lorenzo Uribe (episode 157) - killed by Gracia
- Gracia Herrera (episode 162) - killed by Eduardo.
- Andres Soriano (episode 164) - killed by Renata.
- Gutierrez (episode 168) - killed by Renata.
- Eduardo Uribe (episode 169) - killed by Lautaro.
- Renata Medina (episode 175) - commits suicide.

== International broadcast ==
Country	Original channel	Daily	Timeslot	Premiere date	Finale date	Language	Local Title	Reference/s
Philippines	ABS-CBN	Mondays to Fridays	2:45 PM	3 January 2011	11 March 2011	Filipino-dubbed	Malparida	
