= Coraje =

Coraje (Spanish for "courage") may refer to:

- Coraje Ábalos (b. 1972), an Argentine actor
- "Coraje", a song by Arca from Arca
- "Coraje", a song by la Beriso
- "Coraje", a song by Memphis la Blusera
- "Coraje", a song by Yandel
- "Coraje", a song by WarCry from Revolución

== See also ==
- "Corashe", a song by Nathy Peluso
