= Signos (TV series) =

Argentinian TV series

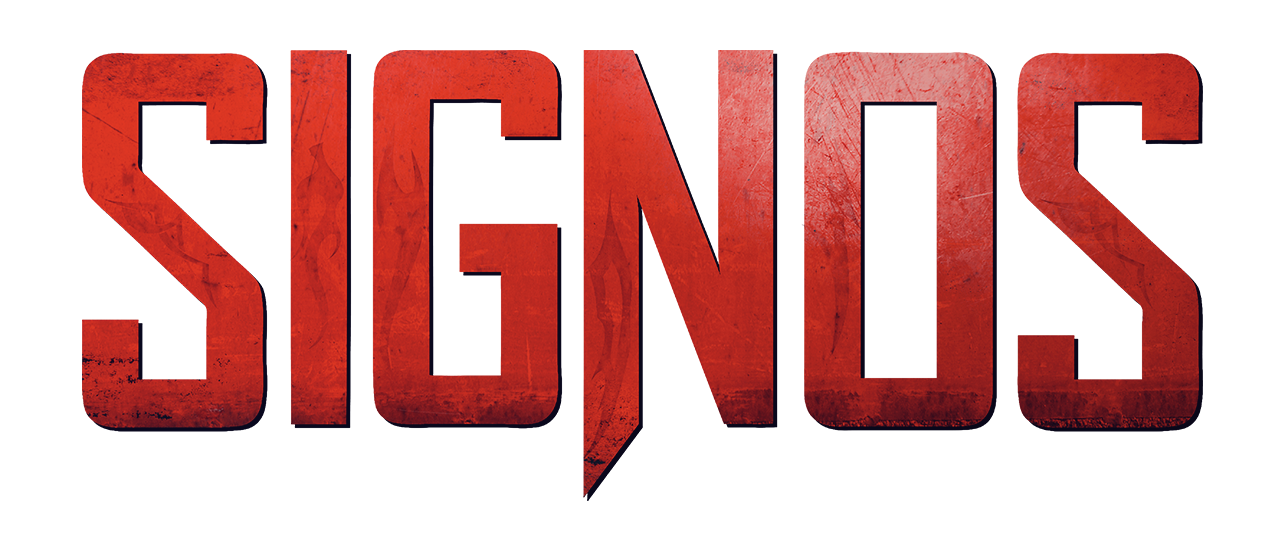
- Genre: Telenovela
- Created by: Adrián Suar
- Written by: Leandro Calderone; Carolina Aguirre
- Directed by: Alejandro Barone
- Starring: Julio Chávez; Alberto Ajaka; Claudia Fontán
- Opening theme: "Todo hombre es una isla" by Daniel Flores and The Rumba Box
- Country of origin: Argentina
- Original language: Spanish
- No. of seasons: 1
- No. of episodes: 16

Production
- Executive producer: Adrián Suar
- Production companies: Pol-ka Producciones and Turner Broadcasting System

Original release
- Network: eltrece
- Release: 2 September – 16 December 2015

Related
- Tiempos compartidos; Silencio en familia

Signos is an Argentine 2015 television series, co-produced by Pol-ka Producciones and Turner Broadcasting System, aired by eltrece and by the American network TNT. The show first aired on 2 September 2015. The main actors are Julio Chávez, Claudia Fontán and Alberto Ajaka. Originally, Signos aired at 11pm, but starting from the third episode, it airs at 10:30pm. The series concluded on 16 December 2015, with an 11.1 audience rating average.

== Premise ==
Antonio Cruz (Chávez) is an ordinary doctor who lives with his sister, Laura (Fontán), and her family in San Rafael de los Penitentes, a quiet town where nothing of interest ever happens. He is a clever and worshipful person, who is unhappy because of something which occurred in his childhood to his mother. He wants to revenge this situation, killing one or more people in each episode according to their astrological sign.

== Cast ==
=== Main ===
- Julio Chávez as Antonio Cruz
- Claudia Fontán as Laura Cruz
- Alberto Ajaka as Pablo Agüero

=== Recurring ===
- Leonor Manso as Beatríz Félix
- Pilar Gamboa as Florencia Barón
- Héctor Bidonde as Óscar Siri
- Cristina Alberó as María del Carmen
- Roxana Berco as Mónica
- Miriam Odorico as Cecilia
- Luciano Cáceres as Ricardo
- Roberto Carnaghi as Miguel Abdala
- Luis Luque as Darío Castelani
- María Merlino as Silvina
- Adriana Aizemberg as Nelly
- Naiara Awada as Manuela
- Guadalupe Manent as Sofía Agüero
- Tomás Wicz as Martín Agüero
- Noemí Frenkel as Graciela Fuentes
- Luz Palazon as María José
- Marcos Montes as Carpaneto
- Carlos Rivkin as Rubén
- María lujan lamas como candelaria

=== Guest start ===
- Franco Pucci as Young Antonio Cruz
- Alexia Moyano as Antonio's mother
- Adriana Balbo as Young María del Carmen

== Awards ==
Awards	Ceremony	Category	Nominee(s)	Result
2015 Tato Awards	2 December 2015	Best miniserie	Signos	Nominated
2015 Tato Awards	2 December 2015	Best Lead Actress	Claudia Fontán	Nominated
2015 Tato Awards	2 December 2015	Best Lead Actor	Julio Chávez	Nominated
2015 Tato Awards	2 December 2015	Best Supporting Actor	Roberto Carnaghi	Nominated
2015 Tato Awards	2 December 2015	Best Supporting Actor	Alberto Ajaka	Nominated
2015 Tato Awards	2 December 2015	Best Directing (on Fiction)	Daniel Barone	Nominated
2015 Tato Awards	2 December 2015	Best Original Screenplay (on Fiction)	Carolina Aguirre; Leandro Calderone	Nominated
2015 Tato Awards	2 December 2015	Best Art (on Fiction)	Mariela Pita	Nominated
2015 Tato Awards	2 December 2015	Best Editing (on Fiction)	Alejandro Alem	Nominated
2015 Tato Awards	2 December 2015	Best Cinematography (on Fiction)	Guillermo Zappino	Nominated

- 2015 Martín Fierro Awards
  - Best lead actress (Claudia Fontán)

== Reception and audience ==
Signos first aired before Binbir Gece, and had a 17.1 average rating, being the third most-viewed TV programme of the day (for Sifema, made 11.8 and was the seventh most-viewed). The following table shows Signos' audience average in each episode, in Argentina, at El Trece, according to both firms that measures media audiences, Ibope and PASCAL Sifema.

=== Ratings ===
#	Episode (Note: Original title in Spanish and English translation.)	Argentine ratings (Note: In Argentina, PASCAL Sifema and IBOPE provided ratings and audience information. The information is based on the day the TV programme is aired.)						
#	Episode	Original air date at El Trece	IBOPE		PASCAL Sifema			Won? (Note: If Signos was more viewed than their direct TV programme comepetence (Historia de un Clan, from Telefe). After 13th, the direct competence change.)
#	Episode	Original air date at El Trece	Rating	Rank	Rating	Share	Rank	Won?
1	Mes de Géminis (Gemini month)	2 September 2015	17.1	#3	11.8	29,9%	#7	Yes
2	Cáncer con ascendente en Piscis (Cancer with Piscis descents)	9 September 2015	11.0	#7	11.3	30,1%	#7	No
3	Sol en Leo (Sun on Leo)	16 September 2015	10.5	#7	9.4	26,1%	#7	No
4	Una sorpresa para Virgo (A surprise for Virgo)	23 September 2015	9.3	#6	9.3	20,4%	#9	No
5	Virgo interceptado (Virgo intercepted)	30 September 2015	9.8	#7	10.6	27,0%	#6	No
6	Luna de Libra (Libra's Moon)	7 October 2015	10.3	#7	11.2	28,2%	#6	No
7	La muerte lenta de Escorpio (Scorpio's slowly death)	14 October 2015	9.1	#9	9.8	28,8%	#6	No
8	Sagitario, en evidencia ante todos (Sagittarius, in evidence to all)	21 October 2015	10.7	#6	10.1	32,8%	#5	No
9	Capricornio en casa I (Capricorn at home, part I)	28 October 2015	10.6	#6	8.4	26,1%	#11	No
10	La naturaleza de los signos, la muerte arruina la familia (Sign's nature, death arruined the family)	4 November 2015	10.9	#5	8.0	20,5%	#9	Yes
11	La frontera entre Acuario y Piscis (The boundary between Aquarius and Pisces)	11 November 2015	11.7	#3	11.1	33,5%	#3	Yes
12	Aries, la rueda zodiacal está a punto de completarse (Aries, Zodiac wheel is nearing to complete)	18 November 2015	11.4	#5	12.7	33,8%	#3	No
13	Dos hermanos enfrentados a muerte (Two brothers facing death)	25 November 2015	12.5	#3	10.5	28,9%	#3	Yes
14	El asesino no se detendrá hasta completar su venganza (The killer won't stop until finish his revenge)	2 December 2015	10.9	#3	11.5	32,7%	#2	No
15	Rueda completa (The round is complete)	9 December 2015	10.3	#2	— (Note: By unknown reasons, PASACAL Sifema doesn't show rating and share information since 8 December 2015.)	—	—	Yes
16	El final: Castor y Polux (The Final: Castor and Polux )	16 December 2015	11.7	#3	—	—	—	No

== Episodes ==
Signos has 16 episodes, and the main character, Antonio, kills someone each episode, according to his astrological sign. Originally, it aired on 2 September at El Trece, exclusively for Argentina, and one day later, it aired at TNT (at 10 pm.), for Latin America. It is also available at TNT GO, on "catch up" system, when the original airing ends.

It was filmed at different places from Buenos Aires Province and Autonomous City of Buenos Aires.
