= Padre Coraje =

- Genre: Telenovela; Historical fiction Romance
- Created by: Adrián Suar
- Written by: Marcos Carnevale; Marcela Guerty
- Directed by: Martín Saban; Sebastián Pivotto
- Starring: Facundo Arana; Carina Zampini; Nancy Dupláa; Leonor Benedetto; Nora Cárpena; Raúl Rizzo
- Opening theme: Y qué by Paz Martínez
- Ending theme: Ay Amor by Ricardo Montaner
- Country of origin: Argentina
- Original language: Spanish
- No. of episodes: 189

Production
- Executive producers: Adrián González; Adrián Suar
- Producer: Pol-ka
- Production locations: Argentina, Buenos Aires
- Cinematography: Ezequiel Spinelli
- Running time: 60 minutes

Original release
- Network: Canal 13
- Release: March 8 – December 23, 2004

Related
- Soy gitano; Sin Codigo

Padre Coraje (English: Father Courage) is a Spanish language television drama. Its theme song is performed by Paz Martinez.

== Plot ==
When Coraje, a young idealist, sets out on a journey to La Cruz, his life is forever changed. Coraje and his friends come across Father John, a priest who has been assaulted by thieves while on his way to take over the parish at a church in La Cruz. Unable to save Father John's life, Coraje decides to pose as the priest. Coraje soon meets Ana and Clara Guericco, whose highly respected father was recently assassinated. Coraje soon finds himself entangled in a web of passion and secret desires. He is caught in a love triangle with the Guericco sisters. Coraje loves the Clara, and the wheelchair-using Ana cannot hide her desire for the priest. Deceit and treachery also drive the plot as the mystery of Guericco's death waits to be solved.

== Cast ==
=== Main cast ===
Actor	Character	Description
Facundo Arana	Coraje / Father Juan / Gabriél Jáuregui	Childhood friend of Santo and Mecha, framed for the murder of Alejandro Guerrico, arrived to La Cruz as Father Juan to find the real killer and clear his name, Amanda's seemingly dead son, in love with Clara
Nancy Dupláa	Clara Guerrico	Elisa and Alejandro's daughter, Ana's big sister, Horacio's ex-fiancee, in love with Coraje
Leonor Benedetto	Amanda Jáuregui †	Mother of Pipo and Coraje, Manuel's lover
Nora Cárpena	Elisa Guerrico	Mother of Clara and Ana, widow of Alejandro
Raúl Rizzo	Manuel Costa †	Main villain, the towns's Mayor, Father of Horacio and Lautaro, Amanda's lover, in love with Elisa
Carina Zampini	Ana Guerrico †	Villain, Elisa and Alejandro's ex-disabled daughter, Clara's little sister, in love with Father Juan

=== Supporting cast ===
Actor	Character	Description
Federico Olivera	Horacio Costa	Son of Manuel, big brother of Lautaro, ex-fiance of Clara, Amanda's lover
Eugenia Tobal	Mercedes "Mecha"	Childhood friend of Santo and Coraje, in love with Coraje, then with Horacio
Javier Lombardo	Santo Tomini	Childhood friend of Mecha and Coraje, in love with Mecha, then with Messina
Matías Santoianni	Pipo Jáuregui	Amanda's adopted son, in love with Messina
Luis Machín	Froilán Ponce	Villain later good, father of Nora and Lourdes, the town's doctor, gay
Erika Wallner	Marcia Krauss	Ana's nanny, was secretly in love with Alejandro, hates Elisa villain
Julia Calvo	Messina Cortese	Prostitute, in love with Santo
Eugenia Guerty	María Teresa "Teté" Andrade	The town's Operator, in love with Manuel
Mercedes Funes	Nora Ponce †	Villain, Froilán's crazy daughter, half sister of Lourdes, Lautaro's ex-wife, in love with him
Fabio Di Tomaso	Lautaro Costa †	Manuel's son, Horacio's little brother, Nora's ex-husband, in love with Lourdes
Melina Petriella	Lourdes Miranda "La Nena"	Froilán's bastard daughter, half sister of Nora, in love with Lautaro
