= Mis amigos de siempre =

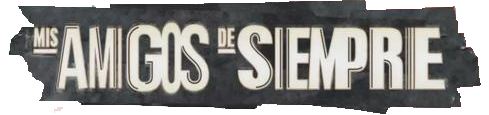
- Logo
- Genre: Telenovela; Police procedural
- Created by: Adrián Suar
- Written by: Jorge Maestro; Claudio Lacelli
- Directed by: Rodolfo Antúnez; Sebastián Pivotto
- Starring: Agustina Cherri; Nicolás Cabré; Gonzalo Heredia; Nicolás Vázquez; Calu Rivero; Emilia Attias
- Theme music composer: Tan Biónica
- Opening theme: "Los mismos de siempre"
- Ending theme: "Afinidad"
- Composer: Axel
- Country of origin: Argentina
- Original language: Spanish
- No. of seasons: 1
- No. of episodes: 160

Production
- Producers: Pol-ka; Paula Granica
- Production location: Buenos Aires
- Running time: 60 minutes

Original release
- Network: Canal 13
- Release: 3 December 2013 – 8 August 2014

Related
- Farsantes; Guapas

Mis amigos de siempre (English: My lifelong friends) is an Argentine telenovela that it was issued from 3 December 2013 to 8 August 2014 during the schedule of Monday through Friday at 9:00 p.m. by Canal 13. It is produced by Pol-ka, owned by Adrián Suar, Artear and Fernando Blanco.

== Plot ==
The series tells the story of three friends called, Simón, Julián and Manuel. A friendship that was born when they were 8 years old while playing in a successful children's soccer team that represented a neighborhood club. When they were around 30 and around a decade without seeing each other, they met again in the same club, which is overwhelmed by debts. Julián (Gonzalo Heredia) son of Inés (Soledad Silveyra), is a professional player who plays in a football team abroad. He is very womanizing, and when he returns to Buenos Aires, Argentina he will fall in love with Bárbara (Emilia Attias), an accountant who also integrates the club's women's soccer team, where Julián will officiate as technical director. Until that time she thought to marry Luciano (Federico Amador), who along with his brother Maxi (Benjamín Rojas), are the owners of a logistics transport company, but Julián's arrival will change everything. Manuel (Nicolás Vázquez) He is a lonely bar owner of nostalgic personality, he longs for the old times of his youth. He will have an affair with Leo (Manuela Pal), also a female soccer team player. Simón (Nicolás Cabré) He works doing deals in the company of Luciano and Maxi. He is in crisis with his wife Rocío (Agustina Cherri) and in addition, he will begin to be attracted to Tania (Calu Rivero), who is DJ and cousin of Bárbara. Simón is distanced from his father, Cholo Alarcón (Osvaldo Laport), who returns to Buenos Aires, Argentina and begins to work as Colectivero of Buenos Aires, but also returns with his other son Guido (Victorio D´Alessandro), whom Simón sees with some suspicion. The treasurer of the indebted club, Andrea (Claribel Medina), cannot face the creditors, who demand that if the debt is not paid off, they will strip the entity of its facilities. There is a possibility to avoid it, winning a tournament that gives the champion team club an important economic prize, thanks to the auspices of a leading company. Meanwhile, the trio of friends will try to rebuild their friendship.

== Production ==
Pol-ka had a difficult year in 2012, as most of its productions had poor ratings against Graduados, the telenovela from the rival channel Telefe. Their 2013 productions had a better reception, and Solamente Vos and Farsantes got the highest ratings. Mis amigos de siempre, the production for the 2014 season, includes several actors who had not worked in Argentine television for some time, such as the senior actors Soledad Silveyra and Osvaldo Laport.

The production includes similarities with Campeones de la vida, an older telenovela by Pol-Ka. The plot is focused on a sports club and many characters are sportspeople. Silveyra and Laport play a couple once more. The plots try to avoid the usual cliches in the romantic couples of telenovelas. The plots are also focused on nostalgia, but not as pronounced as in Graduados. The opening theme was performed by the band Tan Biónica, who had also made the opening theme of Graduados.

== Reception ==
The first episode was aired on 3 December 2013. It got 18.1 rating points.

== Cast ==
- Agustina Cherri as Rocío Monti
- Nicolás Cabré as Simón Alarcón
- Gonzalo Heredia as Julián Ruiz
- Nicolás Vázquez as Manuel Pellegrini
- Emilia Attias as Bárbara Delgado
- Calu Rivero as Tania Delgado
- Osvaldo Laport as Domingo "Cholo" Alarcón
- Soledad Silveyra as Inés de Ruiz
- Benjamín Rojas as Máximo Barraco
- Martin Seefeld as Oscar Pires
- Claribel Medina as Andrea
- Felipe Colombo as Fidel
- Leticia Brédice as Carolina
- Gustavo Conti as Fabián
- Michel Noher as José María
- Nicolás Pauls as León
- Esteban Pérez as Mariano
- Manuela Pal as Leonora "Leo" Barceló
- Federico Amador as Luciano Barraco
- Ana María Colombo as Alicia Barraco
- Victorio D'Alessandro as Guido Alarcón
- Juana Viale as Delfina Correa
- Florencia Raggi as Natalia/Clara Aguirre
- Joaquín Flamini as Aquiles Suárez
- Natalia Carabetta as Zoe Alarcón
- Leonora Balcarce as Josefina
- Leticia Siciliani as Sol
- Agustina Attias as Agustina
- Belén Persello as Ruth
- Francisco Fernández de Rosa as Patricio
- Nicolás Mele as Germán
- Maia Dosoretz as Maia
- Miguel Jordan as Higilio
- Ana Moreno as Ana
- Jimena Riestra as Ilondra
- María Ibarreta as Thelma
- Sol Madrigal as Mara
- Nicolás Goldschmidt as Ezequiel
- Gastón Ricaud as Nico
- Martín Orecchio as Tomás
- Alejandro Paker as Álvaro
- Mariana Richaudeau as Marisa
- Paolo Ragone as Bruno
- Sofía Elliot as Cecilia
- Diego Treu as Charly
- Malena Narvay as Sofía
- Juano Tabares as Ale
- Diego Pérez as Fernando "Yayo"
- Sebastián Almada as Ricardo "Queco"
- Anderson Ballesteros as Montoya
- Juan Palomino as Suárez
- Carlos Nieto as García
- Noemí Morelli as Professor Martinelli
- Germán Tripel as Bomba
- Daniela Lopilato as Bebu
- Javier de la Torre as Cato
- Germán Rodríguez as Natalia's ex boyfriend

== Awards ==
=== Nominations ===
- 2014 Martín Fierro Awards
  - Best comedy
  - Best actor of daily comedy (Nicolás Cabré)
  - Best actor of daily comedy (Osvaldo Laport)
  - Best actress of daily comedy (Agustina Cherri)
  - Best actress of daily comedy (Calu Rivero)
  - Best actress of daily comedy (Soledad Silveyra)
- 2014 Kids Choice Awards Argentina
  - Favorite local program
  - Favorite actor (Nicolás Vázquez)
  - Favorite actress (Emilia Attías)
  - Favorite supporting actress (Manuela Pal)
