= Manuela Pal =

Argentine actress (born 1984)

- Born: María Manuela Pérez Bosch Palos; 9 October 1984 (age 40); Buenos Aires, Argentina
- Occupation: Actress
- Spouse: Gonzalo Díaz Servidio
- Children: 1
- Mother: Graciela Pal
- Relatives: Pablo Palitos (grandfather)

María Manuela Pérez Bosch Palos (born 9 October 1984), better known as Manuela Pal, is an Argentine film, theater, and television actress.

== Early life ==
Manuela Pal was born on 9 October 1984 at the Medical Institute of Obstetrics in Buenos Aires. She is the daughter of actress and singer Graciela Pal, and granddaughter of actor Pablo Palitos.

== Career ==
Pal debuted as an actress at the age of eight months, in Coraje mamá, the telenovela her mother was acting in. This came about when the show's writer, Delia González Márquez, heard that Graciela Pal was missing her daughter, and added a storyline where her character becomes pregnant so they could be together. As a child, Manuela Pal later appeared in Vivan los novios, an episode of Alta comedia, and a pilot for El Nueve with Mariana Fabbiani and Pablo Echarri. In 1996, she acted in the successful children's series Chiquititas, starring Romina Yan.

After she finished her studies, she appeared in some chapters of Malandras, Costumbres argentinas, and Son amores. She also made her film debut in Palermo Hollywood, produced by Patagonik, in 2004. Also in that year she joined the cast of Culpable de este Amor, playing Luciana. After this, she got a role in the Mexican soap opera Frijolito, and made appearances in Casados con hijos and Alma Pirata. She played the granddaughter of Héctor Alterio in Vientos de agua, a Spanish-Argentine co-production, and Fabiana in You Are the One.

Her first leading role came with the film Wrap Up, which was shot in Spain in 2006, released in Argentina in 2007, and in Spain in 2012. Returning to Argentina in late 2006, she starred in a chapter of Mujeres asesinas, where she played Soledad. In early 2007, Pal played Clara in three episodes of Amas de casa desesperadas for the Colombian channel RCN Televisión. She gained popularity as an actress with her work in Son de Fierro, where she played the comedic character Luli, during 2007. That year, she appeared in the pilot episode of La congeladora, a TV series produced by Gabriel García and Eduardo Lopilato.

In 2008, she played the evil Franka Mayerhold in Casi Ángeles, which generated many positive reviews and established her as a favorite among adolescent audiences. She played the main villain of the telenovela Herencia de amor in 2009. A year later, she was in the cast of Secretos de amor. In 2011, she played the repentant villain Paula Lezcano in Herederos de una venganza, and in 2012 she played Maggy in La dueña. In January 2013, she starred in a chapter of a fictional series on the program Historias de corazón. She also co-starred in the Televisión Pública miniseries Las huellas del secretario.

From late 2013 to mid-2014, she acted in Pol-ka's comedy-drama Mis amigos de siempre, which aired on El Trece. In 2014–2015, she was part of the cast of the telenovela Noche y día. In 2017, she co-starred in Amar después de amar on Telefe, playing Laura Godoy. The same year, she played Érika Martin, one of the main antagonists in the telenovela Golpe al corazón, also on Telefe.

In 2022, she joined the Civil Association of Art Workers (ACTA), together with actors Peter Lanzani and Gastón Soffritti.

== Filmography ==
=== Films ===
Year	Title	Role	Director
2004	Palermo Hollywood	Julieta	Eduardo Pinto
2006	Wrap Up	Valeria	Ramón Costafreda
2010	De roma con amor	Gloria	Roberto Malenotti
2012	El faro rojo (short)	Paula	Paula Silva
2019	La sombra en la ventana	María	Gustavo Provitina

=== TV series ===
Year	Title	Role	Channel
1985	Coraje mamá	Baby	El Nueve
1991	Alta comedia	Manuela	El Nueve
1995	La hermana mayor	Luciana "Nina" Sosa Ferreyra	El Nueve
1996	Chiquititas	Florencia Gómez	Telefe
2003	Costumbres argentinas	Florencia	Telefe
2003	Malandras	Victoria	El Nueve
2004	Culpable de este Amor	Luciana	Telefe
2005	Casados con hijos	Pepe's customer, Ep. "Moni radioactiva"	Telefe
2006	You Are the One	Fabiana	El Trece
2006	Vientos de agua	Alicia	El Trece
2006	Mujeres asesinas 2	Soledad, Ep. "Soledad, cautiva"	El Trece
2006	Alma Pirata	Paloma Cortés	Telefe
2007	Amas de casa desesperadas	Clara Rivas	El Trece
2007	Son de Fierro	Luciana "Luli" Manchini	El Trece
2008	Casi Ángeles	Franka Mayerhold	Telefe
2008	Don Juan y Su Bella Dama	Carolina Molina	Telefe
2009	Herencia de amor	Susi Reyes	Telefe
2010	Secretos de amor	Antonella Rossi	Telefe
2010	Contra las cuerdas	Lili	Televisión Pública
2010	Alguien que me quiera	Carolina	El Trece
2011	Herederos de una venganza	Paula Lezcano	El Trece
2012	La dueña	Magdalena "Maggy" Rodríguez Costa	Telefe
2012	Las huellas del secretario	Rita Olivares	Televisión Pública
2013	Historias de corazón	Mariana, Ep. "Un juego para Roxy"	Telefe
2013	Historias de corazón	Pilar, Ep. "Apenas sesenta"	Telefe
2013–2014	Mis amigos de siempre	Leonora "Leo" Barceló	El Trece
2014–2015	Noche y día	Gisela Villa	El Trece
2017	Amar después de amar	Laura Eyzaguirre de Godoy	Telefe
2017	La Búsqueda de Laura	Laura Eyzaguirre de Godoy	Telefe
2017–2018	Golpe al corazón	Erika Martín	Telefe
2018	100 días para enamorarse	Florencia Fernández	Telefe
2019	Junior Express	Luz Flash	Disney Junior
2022	Diary of a Gigolo	Leticia	Netflix
2023	Argentina, tierra de amor y venganza	Lorena	El Trece

== Theater ==
Year	Title	Director
1996	Chiquititas	Cris Morena
2003	Eliot Ness	Graciela Pal
2010	No confíes en mí	Gabriel Rosas and Daniel Suárez Marzal
2011	Don Arturo Illia	Héctor Gióvine
2011	La celebración	Luis Romero
2012	La marca en el orillo	Becky Garello and Eugenia Levin
2013–2014	Los elegidos	Daniel Veronese
2015	Bajo terapia	Daniel Veronese
2017	Un rato con él	
2019	Perfectos desconocidos	Guillermo Francella
2021	Transferencia	Peto Menahem
2021	Los Bonobos	
2023	La verdad	Ciro Zorzoli

== Awards and nominations ==
Year	Award	Category	Work	Result	Ref.
2009	Clarín Awards	Actress Revelation	Herencia de amor	Nominated	
2014	Kids' Choice Awards	Favorite Supporting Actress	Mis amigos de siempre	Nominated	
2015	ACE Awards	Leading Actress in Comedy	Bajo terapia	Nominated	
