= Noche y día =

- Also known as: Noche & Día, junto a vos
- Genre: Telenovela; Police procedural Drama
- Directed by: Rodolfo Antúnez; Jorge Nisco
- Starring: Facundo Arana; Romina Gaetani; Eleonora Wexler; Gabriel Goity; Favio Posca; Eugenia Tobal; Marina Bellati; Gabriel Corrado; Oscar Martinez
- Opening theme: Ni tú ni nadie by David Bolzoni
- Country of origin: Argentina
- Original language: Spanish
- No. of episodes: 122

Production
- Executive producer: Adrián Gonzáles
- Production location: Argentina
- Running time: 60 minutes
- Production company: Pol-ka

Original release
- Network: El Trece
- Release: 17 November 2014 – 19 August 2015

Related
- Mis amigos de siempre; Esperanza mía

Noche y día (English: Night and Day) is a 2014-2015 Argentine telenovela produced by Pol-ka and broadcast by El Trece. It premiered on 17 November 2014 and ended on 19 August 2015, and also stars Facundo Arana and Romina Gaetani with the participations of Oscar Martínez, Eleonora Wexler, Eugenia Tobal and Gabriel Corrado.

== Cast ==
- Facundo Arana as Victorio "Vico" Villa
- Romina Gaetani as Paula Pico/ Paula Inchausti
- Eleonora Wexler as Martina Mendoza
- Oscar Martínez as Guillermo Inchausti
- Gastón Soffritti as Benjamín "Benja" Liberman
- Coraje Ábalos as Gastón Santucho
- Brenda Gandini as Lucila Villa
- Candela Vetrano as Milagros "Mili" Villa
- Pablo Rago as Fabián Aguilera
- Gabriel Goity as Francisco "Paco" Longo
- Favio Posca as Roberto "Robert" Belardi
- Eugenia Tobal as Bárbara Díaz
- Gabriel Corrado as Federico Castro
- Marina Bellati as Evangelina "Eva" Cisneros
- Victorio D´Alessandro as Joaquín "Joaco" Agüero
- Martín Slipak as Sebastián Inchausti
- Pablo Brichta as Humberto Peralta
- Manuela Pal as Gisella Villa
- Maximiliano Ghione as Amadeo Lucero
- Florencia Raggi as Sofía Santa María
- Graciela Stéfani as Patricia Pico
- Claudio Rissi as Ismael Bisoni
- Alejo Ortiz as Adrián Guedes
- Valeria Lois as Amanda Cejas
- Lautaro Perotti as Esteban Garrido
- Joaquín Rapalini Olivella as Valentino Garrido Mendoza
- María Pía Galiano as Jana Vergara
- Diego Hodara as Estanislao "Pipi" Belardi
- Rodrigo Noya as Nicolás
- Johanna Francella as Jazmín
- Duilio Orso as Palacios
- Miguel Habud as Jalil
- Coral Gabaglio as Betty
- Maia Dosoretz as Catalina
