= Valentino, el argentino =

Spanish-language telenovela produced by Pol-ka Producciones and Vista Producciones

- Genre: Telenovela
- Created by: Juana Uribe; Adrián Suar
- Screenplay by: Ana María Parra; Andrés Gelos
- Directed by: Magdalena la Rotta
- Creative director: Pablo Rouco
- Starring: Julián Román; Liliana González; Segundo Cernadas
- Countries of origin: Argentina; Colombia
- Original language: Spanish
- No. of seasons: 1
- No. of episodes: 120 (for international sales)

Production
- Executive producer: Gerardo Sánchez Cristo
- Production companies: Pol-ka Producciones; Vista Producciones

Original release
- Network: El Trece
- Release: 7 October 2008 – 11 March 2009

Valentino, el argentino is a Spanish-language telenovela produced by Pol-ka Producciones and Vista Producciones filmed between Argentina and Colombia. It premiered on El Trece in Argentina on 7 October 2008, followed by its debut on RCN Televisión in Colombia on 27 October 2008. The series was created by Juana Uribe and Adrián Suar for the respective television channels in Argentina and Colombia, and it stars Julián Román, and Segundo Cernadas as the title character's.

It is considered one of the five Colombian productions most hated by the public. On the other hand, the telenovela was only on the air for three days on RCN Televisión, and was subsequently taken off the air due to its low reception by the public.

== Cast ==
- Julián Román as Valentino
- Liliana González as Margarita
- Segundo Cernadas as Alter ego
- Ana Lucía Domínguez as Claudia
- Luly Bossa as Teresa
- Pablo Alarcón as Marcos
- Alejo Correa as Felipe Contreras
- Héctor Calori as Modestio
- Matías Santoianni as Omar
- Víctor Mallarino as Dr. Correa
- Alejandro Fiore as Chanfarella
- Adriana Salgueiro as Tete
- Diego Díaz as Cristian
- Gisela Van Lacke as Fernanda
- Carolina Eugenia Márquez as Paty
- Luz Cipriota as Anahí
- Santiago de Jesús Díaz as Robinson
- Cristina Alberó as Lidia
- Irene Goldszer as Dulce
- Salvatore Cassandro as Marmol
- Santiago Ramundo as Marcelo
