= Segundo Cernadas =

Argentine actor

- Born: Pedro Cernadas; March 20, 1972 (age 54); Viedma, Río Negro, Argentina
- Occupation: Actor
- Spouse: Sofía Bravo (m. 2018)
- Children: 3

Pedro Cernadas (born March 20, 1972, in Viedma, Río Negro, Argentina), better known as Segundo Cernadas, is an Argentine actor and politician.

He was influenced by a show business insider to change his screen name to "Segundo", the name of his favorite fictional character, the protagonist and an actor in Don Segundo Sombra.

Pablo Ponce, a well known Argentine acting instructor, was Cernadas' first professional acting teacher. Soon after, Cernadas was accepted by one of Argentina's top show business academies.

Although Cernadas' main acting interests were in the theatrical area, soon after being accepted by the academy, he made his television debut, acting in Montana Rusa, Otra Vuelta ("Rollercoaster, (let's go) One More Time"). He followed that by participating, as a married medical doctor in 90-60-90 Modelos. In 1997, Cernadas made his third appearance in a telenovela, in Ricos y Famosos ("Rich and Famous"), which became a major international hit. 1998 was an important year in Cernadas' life: after participating in Milady: La Historia Continua ("Milady: The Story Continues)", which was the sequel to Argentine soap opera classic Milady, while considering moving to Mexico to work there, he was convinced to stay in his home country by producer Raúl Lecouna, who offered Cernadas his first starring role as a telenovela actor, in another soap that would become a major hit: Muñeca Brava ("Wild Angel"). This soap opera was successful and that Cernadas travelled across Argentina, and many other countries, to relive his character at various acting venues for the next two years.

In 2000, he played the role of "Bebo" in Los Buscas de Siempre ("The (same) Bullies of Always)". Later on that year, he would once again play a doctor, in Los Medicos de Hoy ("Today's Doctors").Cernadas would not become a major international super-star until 2002, when he flew to Peru to act in Bésame Tonto ("Kiss me, Fool"), alongside Gianella Neyra. The soap opera, which featured romantic, family and mafia twists, became the number one show in many countries, such as the Dominican Republic, Chile, and Panama. In 2003, he participated in Dr. Amor ("Dr. Love") . By 2004, Univision began to show Bésame Tonto in the United States; and Cernadas became the first Argentine actor to star in a Philippine telenovela, when he went to Manila to participate and team-up with Iza Calzado in Te Amo, Maging Sino Ka Man ("I Love You, Whoever You Are").

In 2005 he returned to Argentina and worked at Amor en custodia (2005) and Se dice amor (2006).

== Political career ==
In 2015 he ventured into politics, and was elected councilor for the city of Tigre.

In 2015, while serving as councilor, he was appointed as head of the ANSES for Tigre, generating strong controversy due to his lack of experience. There were allegations of nepotism involved with the appointment. He later resigned from the city council to head the agency.

In 2017, he led the list for councilors for Cambiemos in the city of Tigre. In 2019, he ran for mayor. In 2021, while also regaining his council seat, he was elected president of the Honorable Deliberative Council of Tigre. .

== Filmography ==
=== Telenovelas ===
Year	Telenovela	Role
1996	90-60-90 Modelos	Dr. Fabrizio
1996	Montaña rusa, otra vuelta	Diego
1997	Ricos y Famosos	Agustín Garcia Méndez
1998	Milady, la historia continua	Leonardo López Quintana
1998	Muñeca Brava	Pablo Rapallo
2000	Los buscas de siempre	Baby
2000	Los medicos de hoy	Dr. Federico Ezcurra
2002	Todo sobre Camila	Alejandro Novoa
2003	Bésame Tonto	Romulo Martinez
2004	Te Amo, Maging Sino Ka Man	Principé Aragon de Montenegro
2005	El Patrón de la Vereda	Javier
2006	Se dice amor	Rodrigo García Pueyrredon
2008	Valentino, el argentino	Valentinov alter ego
2009	Pasión Morena	Oscar Salomón
2009	Bella Calamidades	Marcelo Machado Cardona
2010	El Fantasma de Elena	Eduardo Girón
2011	Todo te amo for you	Martin
2011	Ana Cristina	Gonzalo de Ribera Martinelli/Oscar de Ribera
2012	Dulce amor	Lorenzo Amador
2014	Demonio del cielo	Rolando Ferrer

=== Television series ===
- (2003) Dr. Amor ... Dr. Fernando Diaz Amor
- (2005) Quien es el jefe?

== Personal life ==
Segundo Cernadas married the Peruvian actress Gianella Neyra in 2004. They had a son named Salvador who was born in 2008. Cernadas and Neyra divorced in 2011.

In 2012, he started a relationship with the lawyer Sofía Bravo who he married in 2018 after 6 years. The couple have two daughters, Isabel who was born on December 27, 2019, and Jacinta, born on April 19, 2021.
