= Touch the Sky (film) =

- Theatrical release poster
- Spanish: Tocar el cielo
- Directed by: Marcos Carnevale
- Written by: Marcos Carnevale; José A. Félez; Lily Ann Martin; Andrés Gelós
- Produced by: José Antonio Félez
- Starring: Chete Lera; Montse Germán; Betiana Blum; Raúl Arévalo; Facundo Arana; Lidia Catalano; Verónica Echegui; China Zorrilla
- Cinematography: Juan Carlos Gómez
- Edited by: Nacho Ruiz Capillas
- Music by: Lito Vitale
- Production companies: Tesela PC; Alta Producción; Shazam Producciones
- Distributed by: Alta Classics (Spain); Columbia TriStar Films de Argentina (Argentina)
- Release dates: 2 August 2007 (Argentina); 7 September 2007 (Spain)
- Running time: 109 minutes
- Countries: Spain; Argentina
- Languages: Spanish; English

Touch the Sky (Spanish: Tocar el cielo) is a 2007 drama film directed by Marcos Carnevale and starring Facundo Arana, Betiana Blum, and China Zorrilla. It is a co-production between Argentina and Spain. It tells two stories that take place between Buenos Aires and Madrid.

== Plot ==
The story begins on New Year's Eve. A group of friends have a tradition that they carry out every year at the same time in Argentina and in Spain. At midnight in Buenos Aires and at five o'clock in the morning in Madrid, one of them sends up a balloon with a sheet of paper hanging from the string below it, on which they have written their wishes for the new year.

== Cast ==
- Facundo Arana as Santiago
- Betiana Blum as Gloria
- China Zorrilla as Imperio
- Chete Lera as Pedro
- Raúl Arévalo as Fidel
- Jose Casasús as Padre de Santiago
- Lidia Catalano as Teresa
- Montse Germán as Amparo
- Verónica Echegui as Elena

== See also ==
- List of Spanish films of 2007
- List of Argentine films of 2007
