= The Damned Rib =

- Spanish: Esa maldita costilla
- Directed by: Juan José Jusid
- Written by: Marcos Carnevale and Antonio Barrio
- Produced by: Susana Giménez
- Starring: Rossy de Palma; Loles León; Susana Giménez; Luis Brandoni; Betiana Blum
- Cinematography: Alfredo F. Mayo
- Edited by: Geoffrey Rowland
- Music by: Leo Sujatovich and Claudio M. Waisgluss
- Distributed by: ALMA ATA International Pictures, S.L., Argentina SONO-FILM SACI, Galiardo P.C., S.A.
- Release date: 12 August 1999
- Running time: 92 minutes
- Country: Argentina
- Language: Spanish

The Damned Rib (Spanish: Esa maldita costilla) is a 1999 comedy film starring some of the most famous actresses of Argentina and Spain: Susana Giménez, Betiana Blum, Rossy de Palma and Loles León.

== Plot ==
Astrologer Lila (León), literature teacher Margarita (de Palma), erotic-line telephonist Rosa (Blum), and recently divorced faithful wife Azucena (Giménez) all live in the same apartment building. One night, they decide to go together to have fun by attending a show of male striptease. Juan (Luis Brandoni), the taxi driver who brings them to the club, pays attention to a conversation in which each of the women describe their own ideal of a man. From that moment on, Juan dedicates himself to woo each of them one by one by assuming the different personalities of each of the women's ideal man. The plot is soon discovered and the four ladies come to an agreement: to share their ideal man and spend one week each with him.

== Cast ==
- Rossy de Palma...Margarita
- Loles León...Lila
- Susana Giménez...Azucena
- Luis Brandoni...Juan / Arnold / Salvatore / David / Guillermo
- Betiana Blum...Rosa
- Rodolfo Ranni...Carlos
- Fabián Gianola...Tito
- Guillermo Nimo...Himself
- Débora Astrosky...Flora
- Gonzalo Urtizberea...Efraim
- Roly Serrano...Julio
- Nicole Neumann

== Trivia ==
- Each of the female characters is named after a different type of flower (lilac, daisy, rose and asucena)
- Guillermo Nimo, a famous and controversial football referee, appears as himself.
- Guillermo Francella makes a cameo in the final scene of the movie.
- The film was made after the scandalous divorce of Argentine diva Susana Giménez. Rumours say that she made the film to describe in the script what really happened.
