= Cohen vs. Rosi =

- Film poster
- Directed by: Daniel Barone
- Written by: Jacobo Langsner; Aldo Romero
- Produced by: Lujan Pflaum; Fernando Blanco
- Starring: Adrián Suar; Laura Novoa; Alfredo Alcón; Diego Peretti; Roberto Carnaghi; Gabriela Acher; Flor de la V
- Cinematography: Esteban Sapir
- Edited by: Alejandro Alem; Alejandro Parysow
- Production company: Patagonik Film Group
- Distributed by: Buena Vista International
- Release date: 28 May 1998
- Running time: 90 minutes
- Country: Argentina
- Language: Spanish

Cohen vs. Rosi is a 1998 Argentine romantic comedy film directed by Daniel Barone and written by Jacobo Langsner. It stars Alfredo Alcón, Adrián Suar and Laura Novoa. The film premiered on 28 May 1998 in Buenos Aires.

== Cast ==
- Adrián Suar as Ariel Cohen
- Laura Novoa as Carla Rosi
- Alfredo Alcón as Américo Rosi/Mirta 'La Nona' Rosi
- Norman Erlich as David Cohen
- José Soriano as Elías Cohen (as Pepe Soriano)
- Roberto Carnaghi as Giancarlo Rosi
- Gabriela Acher as Dr. Miriam Cohen
- Rita Cortese as Angélica Rosi
- Virginia Innocenti as Sofía Rosi
- Favio Posca as Salvador Rosi
- Rolly Serrano as bodyguard
- Claudio Giúdice as bodyguard
- Diego Peretti as Cameraman
- Víctor Anakarato as Transvestite Prostitute
- Florencia De la Vega as Transvestite Prostitute
- Cecilia Cambiaso as the Cohens' house maid
- Pía Uribelarrea as nurse
- Edda Díaz as BDSM neighbour
- Julio López as BDSM neighbour
- Tito Haas as driver
- Jorge Noya as passerby
