= Alguien que me quiera =

- Genre: Serie Tv; Comedy; Drama
- Created by: Adrián Suar
- Directed by: Martín Saban; Sebastián Pivotto
- Starring: Osvaldo Laport; Andrea Del Boca; Miguel Ángel Rodríguez; Susú Pecoraro; Viviana Saccone; Luisana Lopilato; Alejandro Awada; Nacho Gadano; Juan Palomino; María Leal
- Opening theme: Alguien que me quiera by Palito Ortega and Hilda Lizarazu
- Country of origin: Argentina
- Original language: Spanish
- No. of episodes: 185

Production
- Production location: Argentina
- Running time: 60 minutes
- Production company: Pol-ka

Original release
- Network: El Trece
- Release: 1 February – 15 November 2010

Alguien que me quiera (English: Someone to love me) is an Argentine serie tv produced by Pol-ka and broadcast by El Trece from February 1 to November 15, 2010.

== Cast ==
- Osvaldo Laport as Rodolfo Rivera
- Andrea Del Boca as Rocío Mosconi / Ana Insúa
- Miguel Ángel Rodríguez as Armando Cutuli
- Viviana Saccone as Katia Pérez Alfonso
- Susú Pecoraro as Paloma
- Luisana Lopilato as Bianca Rivera
- Marco Antonio Caponi as Renzo Peralta
- Calu Rivero as Lola Rivera
- Ludovico Di Santo as Teo Carrasco
- Gerardo Romano as Roberto
- María Leal as Malvina Andrade
- Nacho Gadano as Mauro
- Jorgelina Aruzzi as Josefina "Pepa" Andrade
- Julia Calvo as Rita "Pina" Ayala
- Francisco Donovan as Guillermo "Willy"
- Sofía Elliot as Olivia.
- Alejandro Awada as Sandro
- Juan Palomino as Gastón Pineda
- Vivian El Jaber as Brenda "Coca" Reinoso
- Michel Gurfi as Nicolás Vega
- Paula Morales as Lisa
- Florencia Torrente as Mandy
- Gastón Ricaud as Máximo
- Chino Darín as Stuka
- Diego Bugallo as Leonel
- Andrea Campbell as Alicia Cutuli
- Salo Pasik as Carmelo Vega
- Natalia Lobo as Carola
- María Fernanda Neil as Tasha Nuñez
- Nicolas Pauls as Gonzalo
- Diego Olivera as Bautista/Lucas
- Pepe Monje as Nito "Super Nito"
- Florencia Otero as Lucía
- Tomás de las Heras as Tomás
- Andrea Estévez as Analía
- Sabrina Carballo as Jade
- Nicolás Pauls as Pablo
- Gustavo Conti as Pucho
- Manuela Pal as Carolina
- Luis Sabatini as Aguirre
- Alejandra Darín as Clara
- Luis Machín as Gustavo "Bambi" Melgarejo
- Daniel Casablanca as Chito

== International broadcasts ==
- Uruguay: Teledoce
- Paraguay: Unicanal

== Awards and nominations ==
Premio Martín Fierro 2010

- Nominated - Best Original Musical Theme - Palito Ortega and Hilda Lizarazu
- Nominated - Revelation - Calu Rivero

Kids' Choice Awards Argentina 2011

- Nominated - Best Actress - Luisana Lopilato
- Nominated - Favorite Villain - Calu Rivero
- Nominated - Revelation - Calu Rivero
