= Claudia Fontán =

Argentine actress

- Born: Claudia Gabriela Fontán; October 4, 1966 (age 58); Hurlingham, Buenos Aires, Argentina
- Occupation(s): Actress, Radio and Television Host
- Years active: 1988–present
- Spouse: Matias Aubi (2002–present)
- Partner(s): Horacio Fontova (1986–1998); Matias Aubi (1999–2002)
- Children: Antonia Aubi Fontán (b. December 9, 2004)

Claudia Gabriela Fontán (born October 4, 1966 in Hurlingham, Buenos Aires, Argentina) is an Argentine actress, host to radio and television. She has worked in several Argentine telenovelas, such as Sos mi vida, Son amores, Amor en Custodia, Los exitosos Pells and Los únicos. She also worked in Solamente Vos.

== Filmography ==
=== Television Programs ===
Year	Program	Channel	Notes
1988	Sábados de la bondad	Canal 9	
1989	Peor es nada	Canal 13	Various characters
1997-1998	Infómanas	Telefe	Co-Host
2010-2012	Trocca alla Fontán	El Gourmet	Co-Host
2018-2019	Pampita Online	Telefe / Net TV	Replacement Host

=== Television ===
Year	Title	Character	Channel	Notes
1996	Como pan caliente		Canal 13	
1998	Gasoleros	Marina	Canal 13	
1999	Buenos vecinos	Maite	Telefe	
2001	22, el loco	Karina	Canal 13	
2002-2003	Son amores	Carmen	Canal 13	
2004	Los Roldán	Herself	Telefe	
2005	Amor en custodia	Gabriela Almanzi/Achaval Urien	Telefe	
2005	Mujeres asesinas	Blanca and Yolanda	Canal 13	Episode 1: Marta, monja Episode 14: Brujas incautas
2006	Sos mi vida	Mercedes	Canal 13	
2006	Vientos de agua	Cecilia	Canal 13	
2008	Mujeres asesinas	Ana	Canal 13	Episode 4: Marcela, lastimada
2008-2009	Los exitosos Pells	Daniela	Telefe	
2009	Ciega a citas	Dévore	TV Pública	
2010	Lo que el tiempo nos dejó	Lidia Satragno	Telefe	Episode: "Los niños que escriben en el cielo"
2011-2012	Los únicos	Soraya Bismarck	Canal 13	
2013-2014	Solamente vos	Michelle	Canal 13	
2015	Signos	Laura	Canal 13	
2024	El encargado	Clarita	Disney+	

=== Movies ===
Year	Movie	Character	Director
1996	Sol de otoño		Eduardo Mignogna
2001	El hijo de la novia	Sandra	Juan José Campanella
2003	Un día en el paraíso	Pelusa	Juan Bautista Stagnaro
2008	El Ratón Pérez 2	Muriel Labecque	Andrés G. Schaer
2009	Pájaros muertos	Mónica	Guillermo Sempere and Jorge Sempere
2010	Igualita a mí	Elena	Diego Kaplan
2013	La reconstrucción	Andrea	Juan Taratuto
2013	Corazón de León	Sabrina	Marcos Carnevale
2017	Casi leyendas	Abril	Gabriel Nesci

=== Radio ===
Year	Program	Transmitter
2000	Tarde negra	Rock & Pop
2014–Present	No está todo dicho	La 100

== Awards and nominations ==
Year	Award	Category	Work	Result
2002	Silver Condor Awards	Female Revelation	El hijo de la novia	Winner
2003	Martín Fierro Awards	Best Supporting Actress	Son amores	Nominated
2006	Martín Fierro Awards	Best Supporting Actress in Drama	Amor en custodia and Mujeres asesinas	Nominated
2007	Martín Fierro Awards	Best Supporting Actress in a Comedy	Sos mi vida	Nominated
2009	Clarín Awards	Best Comedy Actress	Los exitosos Pells	Nominated
2010	Sur Awards	Best Supporting Actress	Igualita a mí	Nominated
2010	Martín Fierro Awards	Best Supporting Actress in a Comedy	Los exitosos Pells	Nominated
2013	Sur Awards	Best Actress	La Reconstrucción	Nominated
2013	Tato Awards	Best Supporting Actress	Solamente vos	Nominated
2014	Silver Condor Awards	Best Actress	La Reconstrucción	Nominated
2015	Tato Awards	Best Leading Actress	Signos	Nominated
2016	Martín Fierro Awards	Best Actress in Miniseries	Signos	Winner
