= Passionate People =

2002 Argentine romantic comedy film by Juan José Jusid

- Directed by: Juan José Jusid
- Written by: Raúl Becerra; Alex Ferrara; Marcela Guerty; Andrés G. Schaer; Juan José Jusid
- Produced by: Carlos Mentasti; Francisco Ramos
- Starring: Pablo Echarri; Nancy Dupláa; Natalia Verbeke; Silvina Bosco
- Cinematography: Porfirio Enríquez
- Edited by: Juan Carlos Macías
- Music by: Federico Jusid
- Production companies: Patagonik Film Group; Argentina Sono Film; Alquimia Cinema; Antena 3 Telefe; Vía Digital
- Distributed by: Buena Vista International
- Release dates: 6 June 2002 (Argentina); 30 August 2002 (Spain)
- Running time: 100 minutes
- Countries: Argentina; Spain
- Language: Spanish

Passionate People (Spanish: Apasionados) is a 2002 Argentine romantic comedy film directed by Juan José Jusid, starring Pablo Echarri, Nancy Dupláa and Natalia Verbeke.

== Plot summary ==
Uma (Natalia Verbeke) lives in the city of Buenos Aires with her friend Roberto, who happens to be homosexual. She works as a flight attendant, and her job lets her travel all around the world and live an independent life without commitments. But she has a dream to fulfill: to be a mother. Since she can't find the perfect man, thanks to her job, she decides to look for a sperm donor in different parts of the world, but what she is looking for her child's father can't be found anywhere in the sperm banks. After being desperate and tired of not being able to complete her goal, she decides to look for the perfect man that has all the requirements she wants in a father, to leave her pregnant.

Lucía (Nancy Dupláa) is Uma's best friend, divorced with a daughter called Violeta, and is always willing to give Uma a hand in whatever she needs. She manages a travel agency, in which a guide called Nico (Pablo Echarri) works, and is Lucía's future husband. Nico is what every woman wants; handsome, intelligent, a good person and loves kids. All this characteristics make Uma choose him as the donor. But there is a complication, asking Lucía if she can borrow her boyfriend, to accomplish her dream.

When Uma convinces Lucía, she agrees and then tells Nico, which after thinking about it agrees as well. Considering it as "simple donation" in which each person would later follow their own lives. But this simple transaction will bring problems after Uma gets pregnant, and the feelings that no one was waiting for appear, transforming the lives of each of the characters.
