= Pol-ka =

Argentine television and film production company

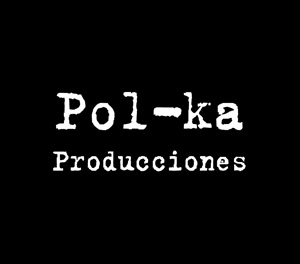
Logo of Pol-ka Producciones

Pol-ka Producciones was a television and film production company in Buenos Aires, Argentina, commonly referred to as Pol-ka.

The company was launched in 1994 and is owned by Adrián Suar, Fernando Blanco and Artear (Clarín Group). The first television show produced by the firm was Poliladron (1994).

After producing a series of hits for Canal 13, Adrián Suar became the programming director of the channel. The production company is responsible for the fictions the channel airs in prime time.

== Filmography ==
- Comodines (1997)
- Cohen vs. Rosi (1998)
- Alma mía (1999)
- Los Pintin al rescate (2000)
- Apariencias (2000)
- Déjala correr (2001)
- El hijo de la novia (2001)
- El Bonaerense (2002)
- El Día que me amen (2003)
- Familia rodante (2004)
- Luna de Avellaneda (2004)
- 18-J (2004) (co-production)
- La Educación de las hadas (2006)
- Abrígate (2006)
- El Niño de barro (2007)
- Maradona, la mano di Dio (2007)

== Television ==
- Poliladron (1995-1997)
- Verdad consecuencia (1996-1998)
- Carola Casini (1997)
- R.R.D.T. (1997)
- Gasoleros (1998-1999)
- Campeones de la vida (1999-2001)
- El Hombre (1999) (mini)
- Por el nombre de Dios (1999)
- Vulnerables (1999-2000)
- Primicias (2000)
- Ilusiones (compartidas) (2000-2001)
- El Sodero de mi vida (2001)
- 22, el loco (2001)
- Culpables (2001)
- 099 Central (2002)
- Son amores (2002-2004)
- Final de juego (2002) (mini)
- Durmiendo con mi jefe (2003)
- Soy gitano (2003-2004)
- Locas de amor (2004)
- Padre Coraje (2004)
- Los Pensionados (2004)
- Sin código (2004-2006)
- Epitafios (2004, 2009) (mini)
- Los Secretos de papá (2004-2005)
- ½ falta (2005-2006)
- Botines (2005) (mini)
- Hombres de honor (2005)
- Una Familia especial (2005)
- Mujeres asesinas (2005-2008)
- Amas de Casa Desesperadas (2006)
- Juanita, la soltera (2006)
- Vientos de agua (2006)
- Sos mi vida (2006-2007)
- Son de Fierro (2007-2008)
- El Hombre que volvió de la muerte (2007)
- Mujeres de Nadie (2007-2008)
- Por Amor a vos (2008-2009)
- Valentino el argentino (2008)
- Socias (2008)
- Valientes (2009-2010)
- Tratame bien (2009)
- Enseñame a vivir. (2009)
- Alguien que me quiera (2010)
- Malparida (2010-2011)
- Para vestir santos (2010)
- Los únicos (2011-2012)
- Hererderos de una Venganza (2011-2012)
- El puntero (2011)
- Lobo (2012)
- Condicionados (2012)
- Violetta (2012-2015)
- Sos mi hombre (2012-2013)
- Tiempos compulsivos (2012-2013)
- Solamente vos (2013-2014)
- Farsantes (2013-2014)
- Mis amigos de siempre (2013-2014)
- Guapas (2014-2015)
- Noche y día (2014-2015)
- Esperanza mía (2015-2016)
- Signos (2015)
- Los ricos no piden permiso (2016)
- Silencios de familia (2016)
- O11CE (2017-2019)
- Quiero vivir a tu lado (2017)
- Divina, está en tu corazón (2017)
- Las Estrellas (2017-2018)
- La fragilidad de los cuerpos (2017)
- El maestro (2017)
- Simona (2018)
- El Lobista (2018)
- Mi hermano es un clon (2018-2019)
- Argentina, tierra de amor y venganza (2019, 2023)
- Otros pecados (2019)
- El Tigre Verón (2019, 2021)
- Tu parte del trato (2019)
- Separadas (2020)
- La 1-5/18 (2021-2022)
- Buenos chicos (2023-2024)
