= 90-60-90 Modelos =

1996–1997 Argentine telenovela

- Directed by: Osvaldo Cappra, Marcelo Cepeda, Mario Marenco
- Starring: Silvia Kutika; Raúl Taibo; Osvaldo Laport; Coraje Abalos; Natalia Oreiro; Sabrina Sabrok Florencia Bertotti; Andrea Campbell; Augusto Di Paolo; Nicolás Pauls; Diego Olivera
- Country of origin: Argentina

Production
- Producers: Mónica Lavalle, Laura Lisorgoski
- Running time: 60 min (including commercials)

Original release
- Network: Canal 9 Libertad
- Release: 8 January 1996

90-60-90 modelos (90-60-90 Models) is an Argentine 1996 telenovela, produced by Telearte. It was aired on January 8, 1996, on Canal 9 in Argentina. It had two seasons, in 1996 and 1997.

This is the story about beautiful women, who had to choose their own destiny. The main roles are portrayed by, Silvia Kutika, Raúl Taibo, Osvaldo Laport, Coraje Abalos and Natalia Oreiro The last episode included a parade, filmed in the Sheraton Hotel. The last episode was aired on July 4, and the telenovela was replaced by Los herederos del poder.

== Cast ==
- Andrea Campbell
- Augusto Di Paolo
- Florencia Ortiz
- Raúl Taibo
- Silvia Kutika
- Natalia Oreiro
- Osvaldo Laport
- Coraje Ábalos
- Florencia Bertotti
- Daniel Alhadeff
- Daniel Álvarez
- Mariano Argento
- Patricio Borghetti
- Manuel Callau
- Antonio Caride
- Pablo Cedrón
- Segundo Cernadas
- María Cersosimo
- Francisco Civit
- Hugo Cosiansi
- Paola Della Torre
- Diego Díaz
- María Figueras
- Judith Gabbani
- Jorge García Marino
- Celeste García Satur
- Claudio Giúdice
- Iván González
- Pablo Ini
- Diana Lamas
- Regina Lamm
- Karolina Adams
- Ernesto Larrese
- Héctor Malamud
- María Maristani
- Mausi Martínez
- Marcelo Melingo
- Cecilia Milone
- José María Monje
- Magalí Moro
- Nicole Neumann
- Diego Olivera
- Marcelo Olivero
- Jorge Baldini
- Julian Zucchi
- Aldo Pastur
- Pablo Patlis
- Nicolás Pauls
- Fabián Pizzorno
- Fernando Ranuschio
- Ginette Reynal
- Jazmín Rodríguez
- Sabrina Rojas
- Boris Rubaja
- Jorge Sabate
- Osvaldo Sabatini
- Sabrina Sabrok
- Viviana Sáez
- Adriana Salonia
- Jorge Schubert
- Tina Serrano
- Paula Siero
- Germán Silvestrini
- Fernando Tobi
- César Vianco
- Elvira Vicario
- Deborah Warren
- Vicky Farina
- Roberto Ibánez
- Coni Marino
- Mónica Santibánez
