= Te Amo, Maging Sino Ka Man =

2004 Philippine television drama series

- Title card
- Also known as: Te Amo, Speaking the Language of Love
- Genre: Romantic drama
- Created by: R.J. Nuevas
- Written by: Suzette Doctolero; Joseph Balboa
- Directed by: Khryss Adalia; Lore Reyes
- Creative director: Jun Lana
- Starring: Iza Calzado; Segundo Cernadas
- Theme music composer: Tata Betita; Rey Valera
- Opening theme: "Maging Sino Ka Man" by Nyoy Volante and Arnee Hidalgo
- Country of origin: Philippines
- Original languages: Tagalog; Spanish
- No. of episodes: 162

Production
- Executive producer: Redgynn Alba
- Production locations: Quezon City, Philippines; Ternate, Cavite, Philippines
- Cinematography: Rhino Vidanes
- Camera setup: Multiple-camera setup
- Running time: 30–45 minutes
- Production company: GMA Entertainment TV

Original release
- Network: GMA Network
- Release: February 2 – September 17, 2004

Te Amo, Maging Sino Ka Man (transl. I love you, whoever you are / international title: Te Amo, Speaking the Language of Love) is a 2004 Philippine television drama romance series broadcast by GMA Network. Directed by Khryss Adalia and Lore Reyes, it stars Iza Calzado and Segundo Cernadas. It premiered on February 2, 2004 on the network's Telebabad line up. The series concluded on September 17, 2004, with a total of 162 episodes.

The series is streaming online on YouTube.

== Cast and characters ==
Cast

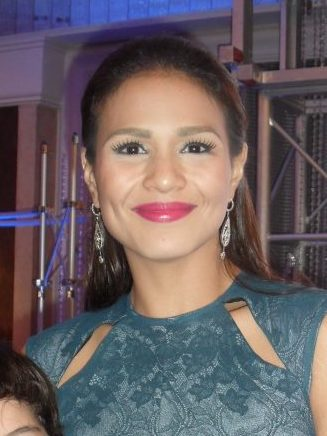
Iza Calzado

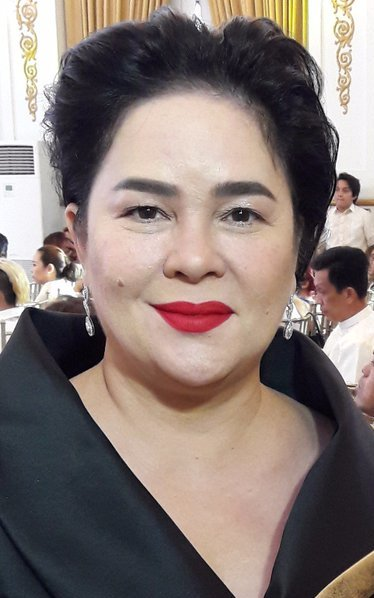
Jaclyn Jose

Lead cast

- Iza Calzado as Rosela Atilado
- Segundo Cernadas as Principe Aragon de Montenegro / Fernando

Supporting cast

- Jomari Yllana as Rodelio Gamban
- Angelu de Leon as Colette Camacho
- Tonton Gutierrez as Minong Gamban
- Elizabeth Oropesa as Belinda Manalo
- Jennifer Sevilla as Gemma Manalo
- Jaclyn Jose as Carol Canonigo
- Johnny Delgado as Arnaldo Camacho
- Princess Punzalan as Amanda Camacho
- Ryan Eigenmann as Edwin Camacho
- Wilma Doesnt as Undang Banal

Guest cast

- Ara Mina as Destiny
- Ian Veneracion as Amiel
- Kier Legaspi as Flip
- Jan Marini Alano as Letty
- Perla Bautista as Catalina
- Raquel Montesa as Mercy
- Mike "Pekto" Nacua as Nomi
- Shermaine Santiago as Marie
- Irma Adlawan as Olivia
- Lexi Schulze as Margarita
- Basti Samson as Billy
- Jaime Fabregas as Antonio
- Orestes Ojeda as Crispin
