= Bésame tonto =

Bésame tonto ("Kiss Me, Fool") is a 2003 Spanish language telenovela co-produced by Iguana Producciones and Venevisión. It premiered first in Ecuador on February 10, 2003, and stars Peruvian actress Gianella Neyra and Argentinian actor Segundo Cernadas who were dating in real life at the time.

== Synopsis ==
Besame Tonto is the story of a young woman who does not know that she grew up in a Mafia family and that she is adopted. Her adoptive father is an Italian mafioso who lives and operates a criminal syndicate in Peru. He is an older man who wants to make his businesses legitimate, and he eventually acquires a newspaper, which he in turn will use to attack his most powerful enemy.

"Julieta Rossini", the young woman, is married to a man against her own wishes. But her real love is "Romulo", who takes her away from Lima and across northern Peru.

Romulo has characteristics that are somewhat atypical of the love heroes of these types of television shows: he wears glasses, greases his hair and chooses to use overalls or plaid shirts. Rossini, however, becomes attracted to his personality and his intelligence, and she does not want to return to a husband she never loved in the first place. But her father sees her leaving as a kidnapping by Romulo, and soon, the police are after Romulo and Julieta.

Julieta's father, despite knowing that she is not his real daughter, loves her dearly and felt he would hurt her by revealing information to her about his businesses and about her being adopted. For this reason, he keeps those two facts as a secret from her. Her adoptive mother, however, is a woman who is only interested in her husband's money, and she tries to instill that desire for money in Juliana's personality.

Upon learning, by his own daughter's admission to him, that Julieta had fallen in love with Romulo, Mr. Rossini forgives Romulo and actually begins to like him. He eventually gives him non-criminal jobs, such as finding out what his mafia enemies are up to, keeping his finances up to date, etc., etc. When Mr. Rossini becomes injured in an attack, he decides to hide and leaves Lima to live in Peru's interior, from where he contacts Romulo to find out how things are going back at home.

Complicating Romulo's family life are a sick father who is in his 60s, a stepmother who becomes pregnant, then loses her baby during another attack by Rossini's rival gang, and a brother who is more interested in money than anything else.

== Cast ==
- Gianella Neyra, "Julieta Rossini"
- Segundo Cernadas, "Romulo"
- Renato Rossini, "Ricardo Escalante"
- Giovanna Azaldegui, "Milady"
- Katia Salazar
- Sonia Oquendo, "Tosca"
- Paul Vega, "Gonzalo"
- Pamela Cortés, "Cori"
- Xavier Pimentel, "Miguel"
- Erika Vélez, "Diana"
- Maggie Vega, "Estefania"
- Hernán Romero, "Donatello Rossini"
- Gabriel Anselmi, "Juanjo"
- Gonzalo Revoredo
- Anita Saravia, "Blanca"
- Liliana Mass
- Jean Carlo Porcile, "Gregorio Escalante"
- Cuty Wais, "Nena Escalante"
- Maria Angelica Vega, "Estefania"
- Jose Luis Terán, "David"
- Paul Martin
