= Expedición Everest =

- Genre: Docu-reality
- Created by: Facundo Arana
- Presented by: Facundo Arana
- Country of origin: Argentina
- No. of seasons: 1

Production
- Producer: Telefe
- Running time: 60 minutes (approx.)
- Production company: Telefe

Original release
- Release: 26 December 2012 – 2013

Expedición Everest is an Argentine docu-reality (consisting of a single season) produced and broadcast by Telefe. The program was hosted by Facundo Arana.

== Background ==
In the program, Facundo Arana and his team of climbers and professional mountaineers climb Mount Everest, the highest mountain in the world, with a height of 8,848 meters. It is located in the Himalayas and marks the border between China and Nepal, on the Asian continent. The objective of the documentary is to seek to make people aware of the importance of donating blood, under the slogan "donating blood saves lives", it is engraved on the flag that was raised on the Mount.

With the help and momentum that Facundo knew how to transmit, and thanks to the effort of the team that continued with the mission, the expeditionaries managed to reach the goal they had set themselves before leaving. The actor had embodied the expedition within the framework of his collaboration with the campaign "Donating blood saves lives", but had to get off the journey due to pulmonary edema.

“Our country is huge, it has many landscapes, a lot of everything, but few voluntary blood donors. Argentines are supportive, science today can do many things but it cannot replicate blood. Don't forget, donate blood, save lives”

— Facundo Arana

== Sound track ==
- Utsav - Kutumba
- Sorcerer's Apprentice - Trevor Rabin (of the movie "The Sorcerer's Apprentice")
- Perseus - Ramin Djawadi (of the movie "Clash of the Titans")
- Sufism - Elzeb
- Lost Message - AIR
- Toshiko & Tommy - Ben Foster & Murray Gold (of the series "Torchwood")
- Jack Joins Torchwood - Ben Foster & Murray Gold (of the series "Torchwood")
- Night Sight - AIR
- Opening Bridge - Asche & Spencer (of the movie "Stay")
- Exterminator Beat - Danny Elfman (of the movie "Wanted")
- Change of Fortune - Thomas Newman (of the movie "Cinderella Man")
- The Urn - Trevor Rabin (of the movie "The Sorcerer's Apprentice)
- Fortified - MX47 (Guillermo Guareschi)
- League of Justice - Immediate Music
- Birth of a Nation - Immediate Music
