= Sin código =

- From left to right: Axel (Nicolás Cabré), Gabriel Nielsen (Adrián Suar), Antonia López (Nancy Dupláa)
- Genre: Police procedural
- Created by: Adrián Suar
- Starring: Adrián Suar; Nicolás Cabré; Nancy Dupláa
- Country of origin: Argentina
- Original language: Spanish
- No. of seasons: 2
- No. of episodes: 104

Production
- Producer: Pol-Ka

Original release
- Network: El Trece
- Release: October 27, 2004 – January 5, 2006

Related
- Una familia especial; Sos mi vida; Los únicos

Sin código (Spanish: Without rules) is an Argentine telenovela that aired from 2004 to 2006 on the El Trece television network. It was produced by Pol-Ka, and the main actors were Adrián Suar, Nancy Dupláa, and Nicolás Cabré. It was nominated in several categories for the Martín Fierro Awards in 2004, 2005, and 2006, and won three times in 2005.

== Plot ==
Gabriel Nielsen (Suar) and Oso (Antonio Grimau) have a private security company known as Nielsen Security. Axel (Cabré), the son of Oso, wants to join it but he is rejected. When Oso is murdered, Gabriel and Axel join forces to capture the criminal. In the second season, most employees resign, and policewoman Antonia López (Dupláa) joins the agency.

== Awards ==
Sin código received two nominations for the 2004 Martín Fierro Awards, as best miniseries and best actor in a miniseries (Cabré). It did not win the award in either category. At the 2005 ceremony for the same awards, the program received several nominations. Rita Cortese, nominated alongside Griselda Siciliani, won the Martín Fierro for secondary actress in comedy; Siciliani won the Martín Fierro for new actress. Favio Posca, Nicolás Scarpino and Alfredo Casero were nominated as best secondary actors in a comedy series; Scarpino won the award. Other unsuccessful nominations were best comedy, lead actor in a comedy series (Suar) and lead actress in a comedy series (Dupláa). It received two nominations in 2006, for lead actress in a comedy series (Dupláa) and supporting actor in a comedy series (Scarpino), but did not win either award.

== In other media ==
Sin código had a spin-off, the 2011 superhero live action television series Los únicos, in which Cabré reprised his role as Axel. In the first episodes Cabré had telephone discussions with Gabriel Nielsen; Suar (who is also the head of Pol-Ka, the producers of the program) reprised his character in April. Siciliani worked on Los únicos as well, but with a new character. She made a cameo with her former character, while still working with her current one.

Suar had plans to make a film out of the series. The first testings would be made in January 2006, and the filming would begin on February. However, when he returned from his vacation in January, he cancelled the project. This angered Cabré and Dupláa, who had rejected other plans for that year to take part in the film. Dupláa stayed for some months in Spain with her husband, and Cabré moved to rival channel Telefe. Suar temporarily gave up acting and focused on his work as producer.

== Cast ==
- Adrián Suar as Gabriel Nielsen
- Nicolás Cabré as Axel
- Antonio Grimau as Oso
- Karina Mazzocco as Noelia
- Jessica Bacher as Ana
- Walter Quiroz as Santiago Nielsen
- Marcelo Mazzarello as Zeta
- Nancy Dupláa as Antonia López
- Rita Cortese as Mirna
- Alfredo Casero as Rolo Wasserman
- Marcela Kloosterboer as Virginia
- Nicolás Scarpino as Ernesto
- Griselda Siciliani as Flor
- Favio Posca as Juan
- Matías Santoiani as Prócer
- Mónica Antonopulos as Carla
- Guadalupe Belén Sosa as Anita
- Gisela Van Lacke as Sofía
- Virginia Da Cunha as Luz
- Pablo Cedrón as Carlos Toledo
