= Todo sobre Camila =

- Genre: Telenovela
- Created by: Annie Van Der Dys
- Written by: Annie Van Der Dys; Valentina Parra; Carolina Colina
- Directed by: Toño Vega Espejo; Luis Barrios De La Puente
- Starring: Scarlet Ortiz; Segundo Cernadas; Bernie Paz; Katia Condos; Yvonne Frayssinet; Carla Barzotti; Denice Baleto; Marisol Romero
- Opening theme: "Y Tú Te Vas" by Chayanne
- Ending theme: "Y Tú Te Vas" by Chayanne
- Countries of origin: Venezuela; Peru
- Original language: Spanish
- No. of episodes: 110

Production
- Executive producer: Margarita Morales Macedo
- Production locations: Lima, Peru; Quito, Ecuador; Miami, Florida
- Editor: Fiorella Suito Chang
- Running time: 41-44 minutes
- Production company: Venevisión

Original release
- Network: Venevisión; Univision
- Release: July 14, 2002 – January 7, 2003

Todo sobre Camila (All About Camila) is a 2002 telenovela produced by Venezuelan production company Venevisión in conjunction with Peruvian production company Iguana Producciones. The telenovela was shot in two countries (Peru and Ecuador). Scarlet Ortiz and Segundo Cernadas starred as the main protagonists while Bernie Paz and Carla Barzotti starred as the main antagonists.

== Plot ==
Camila Montes de Alba (Scarlet Ortiz) is a beautiful, hard-working Economics student who hails from one of the aristocratic families in Lima. But since the death of her father, she is now forced to work in an exclusive club as a waitress after her family has been left bankrupt, with the luxurious Montes de Alba mansion, the Montes de Alba Foundation and the prestige of their last name being the only evidence they can show of their aristocratic lineage. Her mother, Florencia Montes de Alba (Yvonne Frayssinet), refuses to accept the fact that they are penniless and cannot afford the previous comforts that high class people of their status are expected to have. Together with the help of her nanny Juanita (Mariela Trejos), she tries to make ends meet, just like any other ordinary person.

During a fundraiser to collect funds for her family's foundation, Camila meets Alejandro Novoa (Segundo Cernadas), the heir to a hotel empire from (Ecuador). A lawyer by profession, Alejandro is passionate about the environment, but his family's expectations prevent him from pursuing that which he loves most. The two spend time together, and a mutual attraction develops between the two.

However, their future happiness is threatened by the appearance of Eduardo Bonfil (Bernie Paz), a mean and calculating business who has accumulated his fortune through unscrupulous means after rising up from poverty in the city slums. He makes a bet to be the first man in Camila's life, with the aim of marrying her in order to improve his position in society due to the benefits he will obtain from Camila's privileged last name. To achieve his goal, Eduardo goes as far as to seduce Florencia, and knowing that her family is in debt, he loans her money for a potential business where he tricks her into signing up her mansion as surety. Furthermore, Eduardo purchases a very expensive ring that belonged to European nobility to present to Camila as an engagement ring. Meanwhile, Alicia (Carla Barzotti), Eduardo's assistant and lover, is furious over the attention that Eduardo is giving Camila. Out of jealousy, she hires a jeweler to create a fake replica of the queen's ring in order to implicate Camila in theft. After some time, Camila tells Eduardo that she is not in love with him and wants to break off their engagement. However, she agrees to move forward with the engagement party which is to be held at sea in a luxurious yacht near the Galápagos Islands. However, during the party, Camila overhears a conversation between Felipe and Eduardo over the bet they made to win her over. Furious, she leaves the ring to Alicia and jumps off the boat. coincidentally, she ends up at the shore where Alejandro has a lake house. The two make love on that night. The next morning, Alejandro wakes up only to find that Camila is gone. While walking about in the streets of Quito, she meets German and Flavio, two journalist students who met her and her mother while they were studying in Lima. The two agree to help her and take her to their home. In order to hide her identity, Camila cuts off her long, beautiful hair and pretends to be man for a while before she reveals her true identity to German's family.

After a sea search is conducted and with no trace of Camila's body, she is presumed to be dead. In order to achieve her goal of framing Camila, Alicia takes her laptop where Camila typed her journal entries and edits specific parts so that it could appear that Camila had planned stealing the Queen's ring all along. Eduardo becomes furious when he learns of Camila's supposed betrayal, and he vows to ensure to put Camila in jail. After Alicia collaborates with Elena (Alejandro's mother) and Claudia, Alejandro's former girlfriend, Camila is arrested and transferred to Peru for her trial. She is sentenced to life in prison with an impending pregnancy after Eduardo bribes the Prosecutor and the judge conducting her case. Using money in order to achieve his means, Eduardo bribes the prison guards at the women's penitentiary so that he can be left alone in Camila and rape her. However, Camila defends herself by piercing one of Eduardo's eyes with a knitting needle she was using to knit clothes for her baby. After being illegally locked in a dark cellar within the prison, Camila is released through the intervention of Flavio and German who use their journalism skills to lobby against the corruption within the prison. Camila gives birth to a baby girl. Later when she returns to the prison with her baby, there is a fire breakout at the prison after Eduardo bribes two female guards to orchestrate a prison riot where Camila will then be murdered in the scuffle. During the commotion caused by the fire, Camila escapes with her child and fellow cell mate Heidi. they go to her nanny's house where they hide for several days. Now a rich woman after Felipe Bayon left her all his fortune as atonement for making the bet with Eduardo, Camila and Heidi buy fake passports and escape to the United States where she establishes herself as a media mogul and uses her radio and newspaper to destroy Eduardo by detailing all the crimes they have committed.

== Cast ==
- Scarlet Ortiz- Camila Montes de Alba, Main heroine, daughter of Florencia, engaged to Eduardo, mother of Virginia in love with Alejandro.
- Segundo Cernadas_ Alejandro Novoa, Main hero, Irene's brother, in love with Camila, married to Claudia, Virginia's father. Finally married to Camila.
- Bernie Paz- Eduardo Bonfil, Alejandro's rival, Alicia's, Florencia's and Claudia's lover, criminal businessman. Hired thugs to kill Edmundo. Main Villain. Ends up in jail with one gorged out eye.
- Carla Barzotti -Alicia, Eduardo's assistant and lover, hates the Montes de Alba's, frames Camila for stealing the queens ring, kidnaps Virginia but is caught by the police. Main Villain. Ends up in jail. Turns good.
- Katia Condos- Irene Novoa, Alejandro's brother, in love with Patrick. Married to German.
- Yvonne Fraysinett- Florencia Montes de Alba, Camila's mother, Virginia's grandmother. Married to John Perry.
- Mariela Trejos- Juanita, Camila's nanny, long serving housekeeper of the Montes de Alba's
- Fernando De Soria - Andrés Novoa†, Elena's husband, Alejandro's and Irene's father
- Ana María Jordan - Merojita de las Casas, high society member, family friend of the Montes de Alba's
- Javier Delgiudice - Executive Manager of Novoa chain of hotels, Claudia's lover, hates Alejandro. Villain. Commits suicide.
- Marisol Romero - Lucy, daughter of Kike and Patty, German's sister, secretary at the Novoa hotels
- Denice Baleto - Claudia Cantana, Alejandro's former lover, later wife, executive at the Novoa Hotels, has an affair with Patrick, Eduardo's lover. Villain. Ends up in jail for embezzlement of funds.
- Diego Spotorno - German, Lucy's sister, Flavio's best friend, in love with Irene.
- Ramsay Ross - John Perry, an Englishman, investor in Novoa Hotels, family friend of the Novoa's, in love with Florencia.
- Marcelo Oxenford - Felipe Bayon, member of Lima's high-class society, makes a bet with Eduardo that he will win over Camila, but does everything to prevent him from winning. Leaves all his fortune to Camila.
- Mabel Duclos (as Mabel Duelos)
- Enrique Urrutia (II)
- Patricia Frayssinet (as Patricia Fraysinett)
- Tony Vazquez
- Pilar Astete
- Luis Alberto Urrutia
- Carlos Falcone as Rodriguez, a detective hired by Eduardo to find out whether Camila is truly dead.
- Silvia Caballero
