= Mariano Argento =

Argentine television actor

- Born: December 5, 1962 (age 63); Argentina
- Occupation: Television actor

Mariano Argento (born December 5, 1962) is an Argentine television actor who has primarily appeared on Argentine television. He has appeared in over 15 Argentine television series and films since 1994.

== Career ==
Argento began as a salesman and in his twenties was a branch manager of Banco del Buen Ayre. He entered the acting profession late and made his first television appearance in Poliladron in 1994. Then in 1995 he starred in the successful children's telenovela Chiquititas (known in English as Tiny Angels), created and produced by Cris Morena. In 1996 he starred in the telenovela 90-60-90 Modelos which first aired on January 8, 1996, on Canal 9 in Argentina. The series, which relates the story about beauty women, who had to choose their own destiny saw Argento feature alongside actors such as Natalia Oreiro, Silvia Kutika, Osvaldo Laport, Coraje Abalos and Florencia Bertotti.

On October 6, 2004 he appeared in an episode of the series Los secretos de papá.

Argento directed Amigos de la infancia in 2003 and in 2009 he featured in the thriller The Secret in Their Eyes. Directed by Juan José Campanella and based on Eduardo Sacheri's novel La pregunta de sus ojos (English: The Question in Their Eyes), Argento appeared alongside Ricardo Darín, Soledad Villamil, Rafael Godino, Guillermo Francella and Pablo Rago.

== Filmography ==
- Poliladron (TV series, 1994)
- Por siempre mujercitas (TV series, 1995)
- Sheik (TV series, 1995)
- La hermana mayor (TV series, 1995)
- Chiquititas (TV series, 1995)
- 90-60-90 modelos (TV series, 1996)
- Verano del '98 (TV series, 1998)
- Buenos vecinos (TV series, 1999)
- Provócame (TV series, 2001)
- Amigos de la infancia (2003)
- Soy gitano (TV episode, 2003)
- Rincón de luz (TV episode, 2003)
- Los secretos de papá (TV episode, 2004)
- Vientos de agua (TV episode, 2006)
- The Golden Door (2006)
- The Secret in Their Eyes (2009) .... Romano
