= Gonzalo Heredia =

Argentine actor

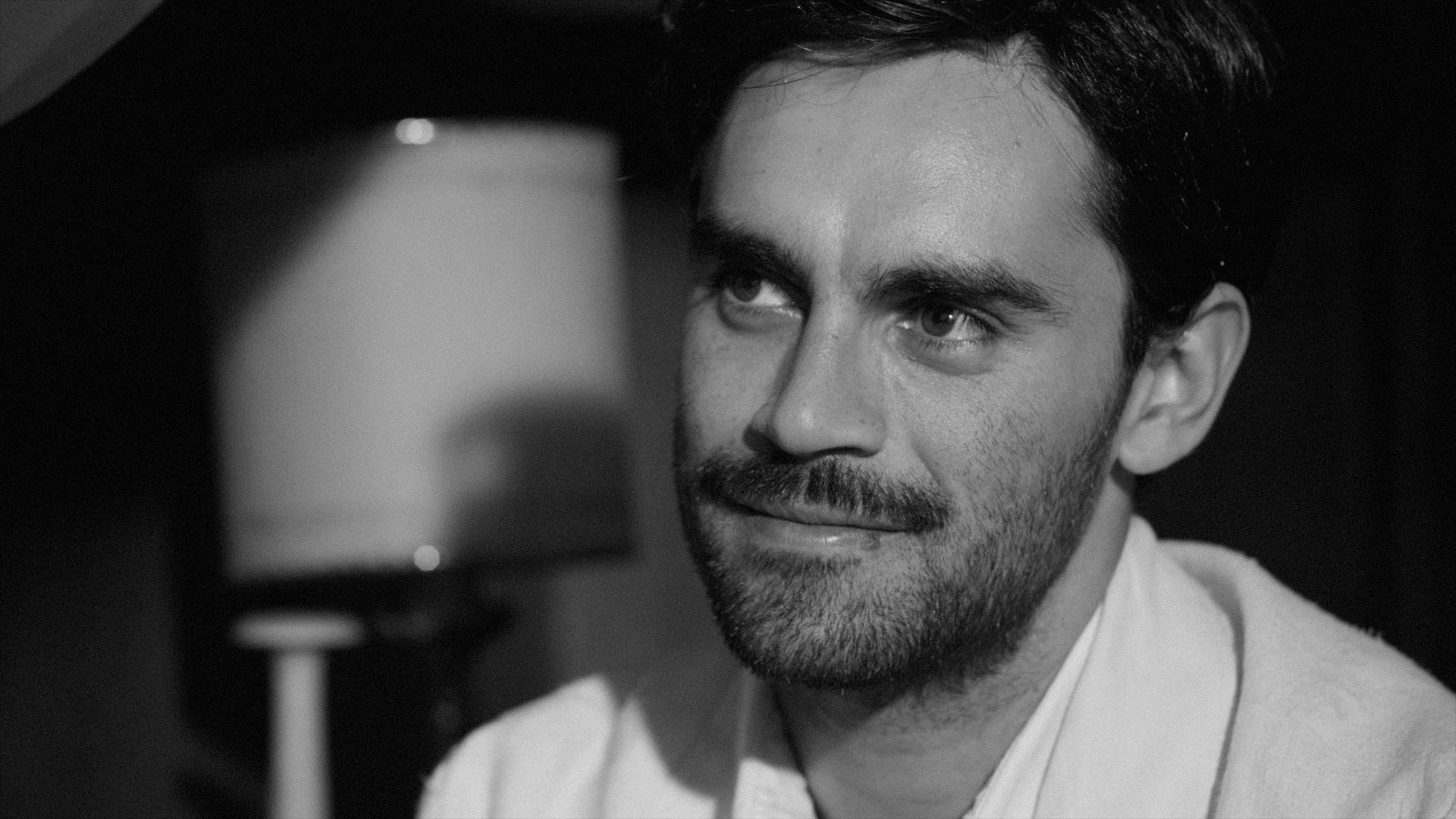
- Gonzalo Heredia on the television series La casa in 2015.
- Born: Gonzalo Ezequiel Heredia; March 12, 1982 (age 44); Munro, Buenos Aires, Argentina
- Occupation: Actor
- Years active: 2001-present
- Height: 1.75 m (5 ft 9 in)
- Partner(s): Cecilia Roth (2009-2010); Brenda Gandini (2010-present)
- Children: 2

Gonzalo Ezequiel Heredia (born March 12, 1982, in Munro, Buenos Aires, Argentina) is an Argentine actor.

== Personal life ==
Since 2010, Gonzalo Heredia is in a relationship with the actress, Brenda Gandini whom he met while filming Malparida. On August 16, 2011, the couple's first child, a boy, was born whom they called Eloy Heredia. On August 22, 2017, the couple's second child was born, a girl who they called Alfonsina Heredia.

== Filmography ==
=== Television ===
Year	Title	Character	Channel	Notes
2001	EnAmorArte	Maximiliano Correa	Telefe	
2002	Maridos a domicilio	Chango	Canal 9	
2003	Tres padres solteros	Mauricio Galendo	Telefe	
2004	Frecuencia 04	Father Ríos	Telefe	
2004	Los secretos de papá	Tomás	Canal 13	
2005	Una familia especial	Diego Bolaños	Canal 13	
2006	Chiquititas Sin Fin	Mateo Von Bauer	Telefe	
2006	Mujeres asesinas	Sergio	Canal 13	"Episode 37: Leticia, codiciosa"
2007	Mujeres de nadie	Rolando "Rolo" Pérez	Canal 13	
2008-2009	Socias	Mariano Rivas	Canal 13	
2009-2010	Valientes	Enzo Sosa/Enzo Morales	Canal 13	
2010-2011	Malparida	Lautaro Uribe	Canal 13	
2011	Los únicos		Canal 13	
2011	El puntero	Mateo "Facha" Sonoria	Canal 13	
2012	Lobo	Lucas Moreno/Germán Díaz Pujol	Canal 13	
2012	Amores de historia	Leandro	Canal 9	"Episode 1: Marta y Leandro"
2012	Tiempos compulsivos	Fabián Milano	Canal 13	
2013-2014	Mis amigos de siempre	Julián Ruiz	Canal 13	
2015	La casa	Lucio Viterbo	TV Pública	"Episode 1: Criatura"
2015	Variaciones Walsh	Agustín Morel	TV Pública	"Episode 1: La aventura de las pruebas de imprenta"
2016	Los ricos no piden permiso	Agustín Villalba/Agustín Campos	Canal 13	
2019	Argentina, tierra de amor y venganza	Aldo Moretti	Canal 13	
2019	Otros pecados	Gonzalo Oroño	Canal 13	"Episode 6: Cuento de invierno"
2019	Tu parte del trato	Psychologist	Canal 13	
2021	Sky Rojo	Police Sergeant Montes	Netflix	
2021	La 1-518, somos uno	Bruno Medina	Canal 13	

=== Movies ===
Year	Movie	Character	Director
2002	El día del retiro	Alejandro	Diego Shaalo
2005	Ronda nocturna	Víctor	Edgardo Cozarinsky
2007	El otro y el mismo		Felipe Costa
2009	Felicitas	Enrique Ocampo	María Teresa Costantini
2013	Omisión	Santiago Murray	Marcelo Páez Cubells
2016	Me casé con boludo		Juan Taratuto
2018	No llores por mí, Inglaterra	Manuel "Manolete" Cajide	Néstor Montalbano

=== Theater ===
Year	Title	Character	Director	Theater
2005	Squash, Escenas de la vida de un actor		Edgardo Cozarinsky	
2007	La jaula de las locas		Ricardo Pashkus	
2009-2010	Valientes	Enzo Sosa/Enzo Morales		
2012	El montaplatos	Ben	Débora Astrosky	Teatro El Piccolino
2013	El don de la palabra		Alejandro Tantanian	
2015	Julio César			
2016	Poder absoluto	Gerhard Bauer	Oscar Barney Finn	Teatro Payro
2018	Perfectos desconocidos		Guillermo Francella	
2019	Desnudos	Martín	Esther Feldman and Alejandro Maci	Teatro Neptuno

== Awards and nominations ==
Year	Award	Category	Work	Result
2008	Clarín Awards	Revelation Actor	Socias	Nominated
2010	Martín Fierro Awards	Novel Leading Actor	Valientes	Nominated
2011	Martín Fierro Awards	Novel Leading Actor	Malparida	Nominated
