= Wrap Up =

Abrígate
- Poster
- Directed by: Ramón Costafreda
- Written by: Ramón Costafreda, Fernando Castets
- Release dates: March 25, 2007 (Lleida Latin-American Film Festival); May 23, 2008 (Spain)
- Running time: 98 minutes
- Countries: Spain; Argentina
- Language: Spanish

Wrap Up (Spanish: Abrígate) is a 2007 comedy film directed and written by Ramón Costafreda.

== Cast ==
- Manuela Pal ...Valeria
- Félix Gómez ...Marcelo
- María Bouzas ...Adela
- Celso Bugallo ...Coco
- Amalia Gómez ...Leonor
- Pablo Tamayo ...Telmo
- Cristina Ramallal ...Montse
- María Salgueiro ...Irene
- Álex Neira ...Gabriel
- Isabel Naveira ...María
