= Nancy Dupláa =

Argentine actress (born 1969)

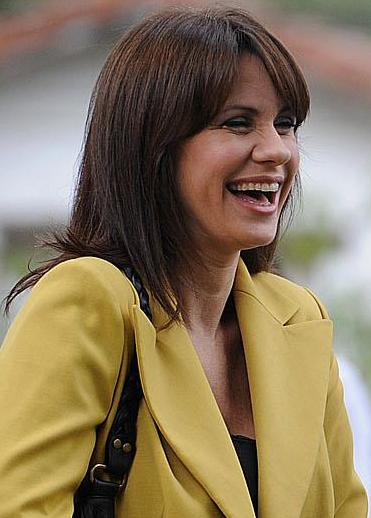
- Dupláa in 2012
- Born: Nancy Verónica Dupláa; 3 December 1969 (age 56); Olivos, Buenos Aires, Argentina
- Occupation: Actress
- Years active: 1991–present
- Spouse: Pablo Echarri (m. 2007)
- Partners: Gastón Pauls (1994–1998); Matías Martin (1998–2000)
- Children: 3

Nancy Verónica Dupláa (born 3 December 1969) is an Argentine actress.

== Biography ==
Nancy Verónica Dupláa was born on December 3, 1969, in Olivos, Buenos Aires Province, and was raised in San Martín, a suburb to the west. She is the sister of the radio host Enrique "Quique" Dupláa and the aunt of the actress María Dupláa. She enrolled in the University of Buenos Aires to pursue a degree in graphic design, but discontinued her studies after two years and then began the career of Maternal and Child Assistant.

== Career ==
An apprenticeship in the local theatre led to her first significant role, that of Mariana, the teen protagonist in a popular local teen drama series, Montaña Rusa, in 1994–1995.

She remained active in the theatre, working with veteran actor Federico Luppi in a local production of The Dresser, in 1997. She first appeared on the Argentine cinema in a thriller, Comodines, in 1997.

She was reunited with Gastón Pauls for the acclaimed Nueces para el amor, in 2000.

While at work in El desvío, she met her future husband, actor Pablo Echarri, with whom she co-starred in the hit romantic comedy, Apasionados, in 2002.

She has won a Martin Fierro Award for best actress, for her work in the television series 099 Central.

== Personal life ==
From 1994 to 1998, Nancy Dupláa was in a relationship with the actor Gastón Pauls, whom he met on the set of the TV show Montaña Rusa.

From 1998 to 2000, Nancy Dupláa was in a relationship with the journalist and radio and television host, Matías Martin. On May 20, 2000, she gave birth to the couple's first child, a boy, whom they called Luca Martin.

On August 23, 2003, she gave birth to her second child and first child with Pablo Echarri, whom they called Morena Echarri Dupláa. On February 7, 2007, she married Pablo Echarri. On April 8, 2010, she gave birth to her third child and second child with her husband, whom they called Julián Echarri Dupláa.

== Filmography ==
=== Television ===
Year	Title	Character	Channel
1994-1995	Montaña Rusa	Mariana	Canal 13
1995	Poliladron	Viviana	Canal 13
1996	El último verano	Chaveli	Canal 13
1996-1998	Verdad consecuencia	Fernanda	Canal 13
1997	R.R.D.T	Carolina Ferré	Canal 13
1998-1999	Verano del '98	Dolores "Loli" Vidal	Telefe
2000	Los buscas de siempre	Bárbara Giménez Álzaga	Canal 9
2001	22, el loco	Laura Copioli	Canal 13
2002	099 Central	Laura Copioli	Canal 13
2003	Durmiendo con mi jefe	Silvina	Canal 13
2004	Padre Coraje	María Clara Guerrico	Canal 13
2005	Sin código	Antonia "Toni" López	Canal 13
2005	Botines	Silvina Aguirre	Canal 13
2006	Mujeres asesinas	Laura	Canal 13
2006	Hermanos y detectives	Verónica	Telefe
2007	El hombre que volvió de la muerte	Erika Ortiz	Canal 13
2008-2009	Socias	Dolores Mollet	Canal 13
2009	Dromo	Gabriela	América TV
2010	Todos contra Juan 2	Herself	Telefe
2011	El hombre de tu vida	Sofía	Telefe
2012	Graduados	María Laura "Loli" Falsini	Telefe
2014	Viudas e hijos del Rock & Roll	María Laura "Loli" Falsini	Telefe
2016	La Leona	María "Leona" Leone	Telefe
2018	100 días para enamorarse	Antonia Salinas	Telefe
2020	Los internacionales	Claudia	Telefe
2021	El reino	Roberta Candia	Netflix

=== Movies ===
Year	Movie	Character	Director
1997	Comodines	Carla	Jorge Nisco
1998	El desvío	Gabriela	Horacio Maldonado
1998	Buenos Aires me mata	Arteche	Beda Docampo Feijóo
1998	Diario para un cuento	Paola	Jana Bokova
2000	Nueces para el amor	Claudia	Alberto Lecchi
2002	Apasionados	Lucía	Juan José Jusid
2009	Boogie, el aceitoso	Marcia	Gustavo Cova
2014	Wild Tales	Victoria	Damián Szifron
2019	El retiro	Laura	Ricador Díaz Lacoponi
2023	Women on the Edge	Mónica	Azul Lombardía
2024	Goyo		

=== Television Programs ===
Year	Program	Channel	Notes
1991-1993	El agujerito sin fin	Canal 13	Cheerleader

== Awards and nominations ==
Year	Award	Category	Work	Result
2001	Martín Fierro Awards	Actress Novel Protagonist	Los buscas de siempre	Nominated
2002	Martín Fierro Awards	Novel Actress	22, el loco	Nominated
2003	Martín Fierro Awards	Actress Novel Protagonist	099 Central	Winner
2005	Martín Fierro Awards	Actress Novel Protagonist	Padre Coraje	Nominated
2005	Martín Fierro Awards	Comedy Star Actress	Sin código	Nominated
2006	Martín Fierro Awards	Comedy Star Actress	Sin código	Nominated
2008	Martín Fierro Awards	Actress protagonist of miniseries	El hombre que volvió de la muerte Los cuentos de Fontanarrosa	Nominated
2009	Martín Fierro Awards	Actress protagonist of miniseries	Socias	Nominated
2013	Tato Awards	Actress protagonist in daily fiction	Graduados	Winner
2013	Martín Fierro Awards	Actress protagonist in daily fiction	Graduados	Nominated
2016	Tato Awards	Actress protagonist in daily fiction	La leona	Nominated
2016	Martín Fierro Awards	Actress protagonist in daily fiction	La leona	Winner
2017	Martín Fierro Awards	Actress protagonist in daily fiction	La leona	Nominated
2018	Notirey Awards	100 días para enamorarse	Best Actress in Daily Fiction	Nominated
