= Gianella Neyra =

Peruvian actress

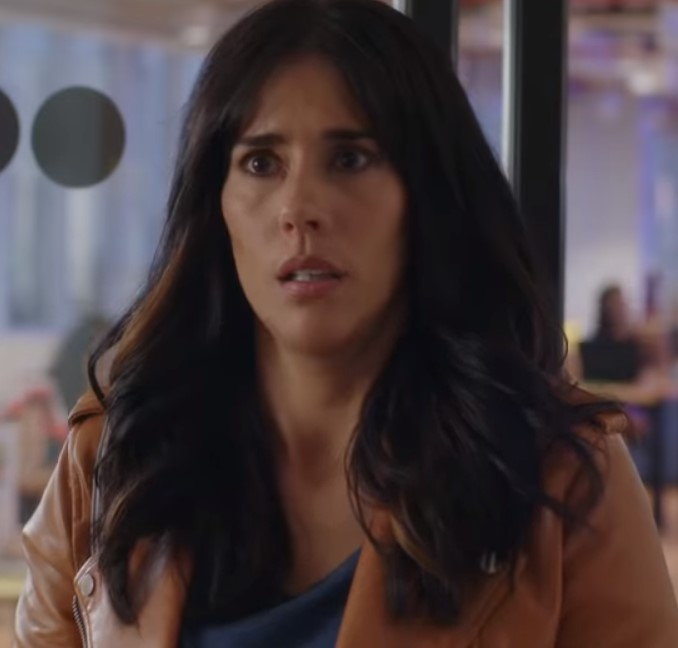
- Gianella Neyra in 2019
- Born: Gianella Neyra Magagna; 3 May 1977 (age 49); Arequipa, Peru
- Occupation: Actress
- Spouse: Cristian Rivero
- Children: 2

Gianella Neyra Magagna (born 3 May 1977 in Arequipa, Peru), is a Peruvian actress and model.

== Career ==
Neyra began acting at the age of seven and, as a child, attended the Actors Studio in New York City. In Peru, she pursued a modeling career.

In 2002, she was hired by Peru's Iguana Productions to star in the soap opera Bésame Tonto ("Kiss me, Fool") where she played the daughter of a mafia boss.

In 2004, Neyra went to Argentina to perform in Luna salvaje ("Savage Moon"), starring with Juan Darthés and Catalina Artusi. Neyra continued to star in other Argentinian productions including Culpable de Este Amor ("Guilty of This Love") and ¿Quién es el Jefe? ("Who is the Boss?").

== Personal life ==
In 2004, Neyra married her "Besame Tonto" co-star, Argentine actor Segundo Cernadas from whom she separated in 2011 and later divorced. The couple has a son, Salvador, born in 2008. Gianella Neyra later met Cristian Rivero, a Peruvian TV personality, with whom she's had a long relationship and now have a son, Gaetano, born in 2015.

== Telenovelas ==
- 1995: Malicia
- 1996: Obsesión (Rita Reynoso/Rita Martin/Mariana)
- 1997: Escándalo (Natalia)
- 1997: Torbellino (Eliana)
- 1998: Coraje (Reportera TV 1)
- 1999: Girasoles para Lucía (Lucía Trevi)
- 2000: María Rosa, búscame una esposa (María Rosa Garcia)
- 2000: Imposible amor
- 2000: Ciudad de M (Sandra)
- 2000: Amantes de Luna Llena (Isabel Rigores)
- 2001: Yago, pasión morena (Morena Gallardo-Sirenio Chávez de Salaverri-Sirenio Rivas)
- 2003: Bésame tonto (Julieta Rossini)
- 2003: Polvo enamorado (Natalia)
- 2004: Con Game (Note: "Doble juego" (Peru))
- 2004: Culpable de este amor (Laura Cazenave de Salazar)
- 2005: ¿Quién es el jefe? (Soledad Carreras)
- 2006: Dragones: destino de fuego (voice)
- 2007: El capo
- 2007: Mi problema con las mujeres (Sol)
- 2009: Los exitosos Gome$ (Sol Gomes)
- 2010: Pobre Millonaria (Isabella del Castillo)
- 2011: LaLola (Dolores "Lola" Padilla Gassols)
