= Igualita a mí (2010 film) =

2010 Argentine comedy film

- Film poster
- Directed by: Diego Kaplan
- Written by: Adrián Suar; Juan Vera; Daniel Cúparo; Mariano Vera
- Produced by: Alejandro Cacetta; Juan Pablo Galli; Juan Lovece; Juan Vera
- Starring: Florencia Bertotti; Adrián Suar; Claudia Fontán; Juan Carlos Galván; Gabriel Chame Buendía; Ana María Castel; Andrea Goldberg; Marco Gianoli; Florencia Miller; Noelia Marzol; Laura Ines Fernández
- Cinematography: Félix Monti
- Edited by: Alejandro Carrillo Penovi
- Music by: Iván Wyszogrod
- Production company: Patagonik Film Group
- Distributed by: Buena Vista International
- Release date: August 12, 2010
- Running time: 110 minutes
- Country: Argentina
- Language: Spanish

Igualita a mí (lit. 'Equal to me') is a 2010 Argentine comedy film directed by Diego Kaplan and starring Florencia Bertotti and Adrián Suar. The film was the highest-grossing Argentine film of 2010.

== Plot ==
Fredy, an unmarried 41-year-old man has no children and lives at night. He is the archetypal playboy, without a steady job and eternal seducer. One night, Fredy meets Aylin. Believing he will have a new affair, Aylin surprises him with the news that she is his daughter and he is going to be a grandfather. This changes his life when he least expected it.

== Cast ==
- Florencia Bertotti as Aylin
- Adrián Suar as Fredy
- Claudia Fontán as Elena
- Juan Carlos Galvan as Tony
- Gabriel Chame Buendia as Roque
- Ana Maria Castel as Dora
- Andrea Goldberg as Deborah
- Marco Gianoli as Young Fredy
- Florencia Miller as Marlana
- Noelia Marzol as Uma
- Laura Fernandez as Girl at the party

== Box office ==
It was the highest grossing film of 2010, surpassing 835 thousand viewers.

== Awards and nominations ==
Award	Category	Recipient	Result
Argentine Academy of Cinematography Arts and Sciences Awards	Best Supporting Actress	Claudia Fontán	Won
Argentine Academy of Cinematography Arts and Sciences Awards	Best Sound	José Luis Díaz	Won

== Adaptation ==
An official Indian adaptation titled Jawaani Jaaneman was released in 2020 starring Saif Ali Khan, Tabu and Alaya F.
