= Betiana Blum =

Argentine actress (born 1939)

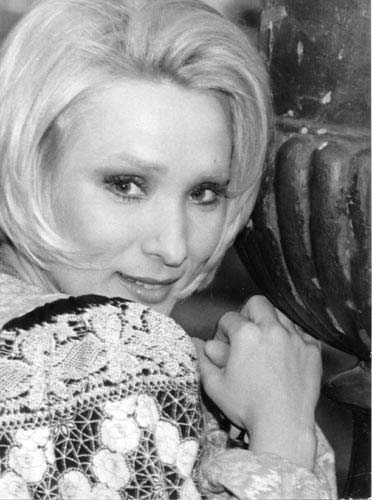
- Born: Betty Ana Blum; 23 July 1939 (age 87); Charata, Chaco, Argentina
- Other name: Betiana Blum
- Occupation: Actress
- Years active: 1964–present
- Spouses: Ricardo Parrotta; Oscar Viale; Edgardo Nieva

Betiana Blum (born 23 July 1939) is an Argentine actress.

== Filmography ==
- So Much Love to Give (2020)
- Esperando la carroza 2: se acabó la fiesta (2009)...Nora
- Touch the Sky (2007)...Gloria
- Ciudad en celo (2006)...Marta
- Queens (2005)...Ofelia
- El vestido de terciopelo (telefilm - 2001)...Cornelia
- El mar de Lucas (1999)...Ana
- Esa maldita costilla (1999)...Rosa
- Secret of the Andes (1998)
- Momentos robados (1997)
- Noche de ronda (1997)
- Bajo bandera (1997)...Bonavena
- Convivencia (1994)
- I Don't Want to Talk About It (1993)
- Te amo (1986)...Coca
- Sin querer, queriendo (1985)
- Waiting for the Hearse (1985)...Nora
- Los insomnes (1984)
- Atrapadas (1984)...Martina
- Juego perverso (inconclusa - 1984)
- Rosa de lejos (1980)
- Un toque differente (1977)
- Las turistas quieren guerra (1977)
- La noche del hurto (1976)
- The Unbreakables (1975)
- A World of Love (1975)
- Bodas de cristal (1975)
- Las procesadas (1975)...Martina
- Carmiña (Su historia de amor) (1975)...Elvira
- Muñequitas de medianoche (inédita - 1974)
- La Sartén por el mango (1972)
- Sombras en el cielo (1964)
- Soy gitano...Alba
