= Coraje Ábalos =

Argentine film and television actor (born 1972)

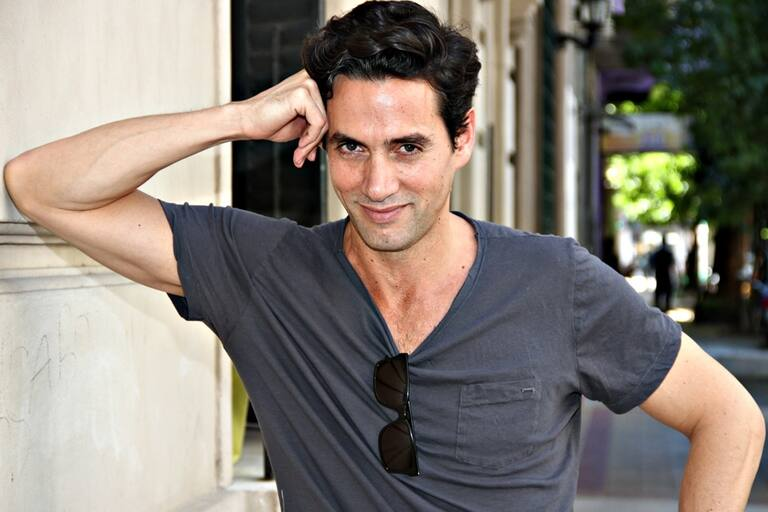
- Born: Roberto Coraje Ábalos; 16 August 1972 (age 54); Santiago del Estero, Argentina
- Occupation: Actor
- Years active: 1992–present
- Spouse: Mónica Antonópulos (m. 2007; div. 2013)
- Children: 1

Roberto Coraje Ábalos (born 16 August 1972) is an Argentine film and television actor. He has appeared in more than fifteen TV shows.

== Biography ==
He worked at the consulate of New York, in an area of “promoción de la Argentina como destino turístico y otras bondades” until 2001.

== Personal life ==
In 2007 he begins a relationship with the actress Mónica Antonópulos, with whom he had a son in 2012 named Camilo and from which he separated in 2013.

== Career ==
He debuted in 1992 on the show Jugate conmigo presented and produced by Cris Morena. In cinema he acted in the movies Bacanal, In the year 1999. Then he acted in the telenovelas Quereme, La hermana mayor and 90 60 90 modelos, the latter was one of his greatest television hits playing the Natalia Oreiro gallant. He continued acting in fictions like RRDT, Son o se hacen and Drácula and resumed his acting career in 2003 in Son amores. Later other characters arrived in Mosca & Smith, Soy tu fan and Champs 12. In 2007 he debuted in theater at work La extraña pareja, starring Carlin Calvo and Pablo Rago. He made special participations in Ciega a citas, Herencia de amor, Un año para recordar, El hombre de tu vida, Historia clínica and Vecinos en guerra. In cinema he acted in the movies Noche de silencio insomne in 2011. In 2012 he acts in the series Babylon and the following year he integrates the cast of the Pol-ka telecomedy Solamente vos like heartthrob of María Eugenia Suárez.

== Filmography ==
=== Television Programs ===
Year	Program	Channel	Notes
1992	Jugate conmigo	Telefe	Cheerleader

=== Television ===
Year	Title	Character	Channel
1993	Déjate querer	Miguel Hernández	Telefe
1993	Mi cuñado	Postman	Telefe
1994	Quereme	Federico	Telefe
1994	Montaña Rusa	Ignacio "Nacho" Ruiz	Canal 13
1995	La hermana mayor	Víctor	Canal 9
1996-1997	90 60 90 Modelos	Federico Ramos	Canal 9
1997	R.R.D.T.	Mauro	Canal 13
1998	Son o se hacen?	Pavlovsky	Canal 9
1999	Drácula	Benicio	América TV
2000-2002	Tiempo final		Telefe
2003	Son amores	Edu	Canal 13
2004-2005	Mosca & Smith	Castelanos	Telefe
2006	Soy tu fan	Rocco	Canal 9
2008	Mujeres de nadie	Dr. Rodrigo Morales	Canal 13
2009	Champs 12	Santiago	América TV
2009-2010	Ciega a citas	Jerónimo	TV pública
2010	Herencia de amor	Alberto	Telefe
2011	Un año para recordar	Pablo	Telefe
2011	El hombre de tu vida	Ludovico	Telefe
2012	Babylon		Canal 9
2013	Historia clínica	José de San Martín	Telefe
2013	Los vecinos en guerra	Sergio Bernal	Telefe
2013-2014	Solamente vos	Nacho Molina Montes	Canal 13
2015	Historia de un clan	Lucas	Telefe
2015-2016	Noche y día	Gastón Santucho	Canal 13
2019	Pequeña Victoria	Gustavo	Telefe

=== Movies ===
Year	Movie	Character	Director
1999	Bacanal	Florencio	Agustín Alberdi, Martín Alomar, Mariana Barassi, Fernanda Chali, Bárbara Keen, Fernando Portabales and Eloísa Solaas
2011	Noche de silencio insomne	Barman	Anna Elias

=== Theater ===
Year	Title	Character	Director
2007-2008	La extraña pareja	Félix Unger	Luis Cicero and Pablo Rago
