= Fernando Blanco =

Mexican footballer (born 1951)

Personal information
- Date of birth: 4 June 1951 (age 75)
- Position: Forward

International career
Years	Team	Apps	(Gls)
- Mexico

Fernando Blanco (born 4 June 1951) is a Mexican former footballer. He competed in the men's tournament at the 1972 Summer Olympics.
