= Adrián Suar =

Argentine actor (born 1968)

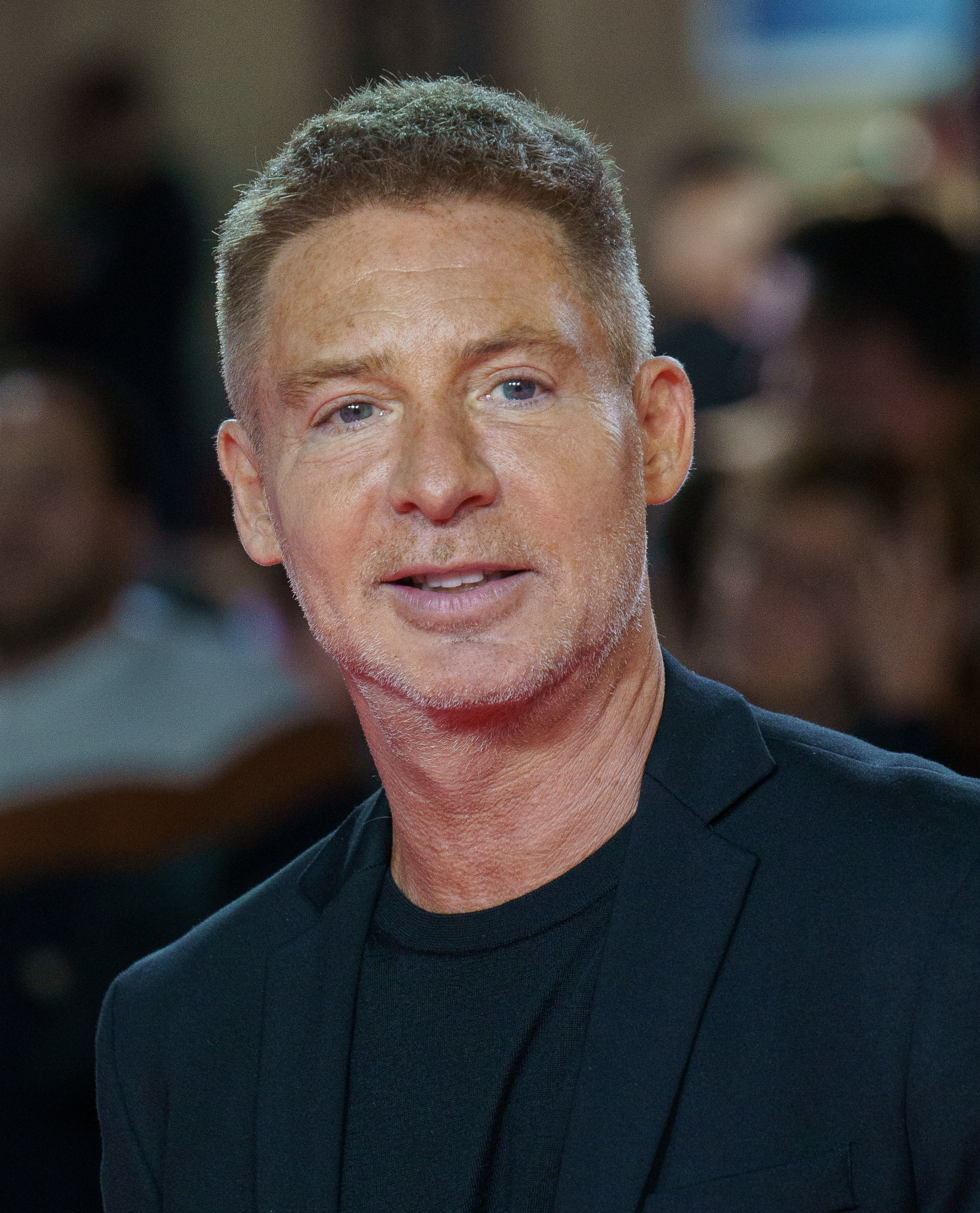
- Suar at the Malaga Film Festival 2025
- Born: Adrián Kirzner Schwartz; March 25, 1968 (age 58); New York City, U.S.
- Citizenship: United States; Argentina
- Occupations: Actor; television producer; businessman
- Years active: 1981–present
- Spouse: Araceli González (m. 1996; div. 2002)
- Partner: Griselda Siciliani (2008–2016)
- Children: 2

Adrián Kirzner Schwartz (born March 25, 1968), better known as Adrián Suar, is an American-Argentine actor, media producer and businessman who is the program director of Canal 13.

== Early life ==
Adrián Suar born in Queens, New York City, on March 25, 1968. His father was Leibele Schwartz. When he was two, Suar moved to Argentina with his family.

When he was 13, Suar auditioned for a casting for Channel 9 and obtained his first role in an episode of a television series called El Ciclo de Guillermo Bredeston y Nora Cárpena. He landed his first major role in 1982 as Adrián in a television series called Pelito, a popular series on Channel 13.

== Career ==
Suar started working in the TV series Pelito at the early age of 13. He then worked in other TV shows such as La Banda del Golden Rocket, Poliladron, Por el Nombre de Dios, 22, El Loco, and Sin código, and films such as Comodines, Cohen vs Rossi, Apariencias, El hijo de la novia, El día que me amen and 18-J.

Together with Fernando Blanco, Suar created in 1994 Pol-Ka, one of the three most important TV producing companies in Argentina, with shows that have been exported to other countries.

Among the series and films produced by Pol-Ka are Por el Nombre de Dios, Comodines, El Hijo de la Novia and Luna de Avellaneda.

== Personal life ==
Suar married in 1996, and divorced in 2002, Argentine actress Araceli González, with whom he has a son Tomás Kirzner. Suar was in a relationship with Argentine actress Griselda Siciliani for eight years, and on June 15, 2012, they had a daughter named Margarita. Their relationship lasted from 2008 to 2016.

== Acting credits ==
=== Film ===
Year	Title	Role	Notes
1990	Charly, días de sangre	Pablo	Film debut
1997	Comodines	Guillermo Parodi	
1998	Cohen vs. Rosi	Ariel Cohen	
2000	Apariencias	Carmelo Posse	
2001	El hijo de la novia	Dobi	
2003	El día que me amen	Joaquín	
2008	Un novio para mi mujer	Diego "Tenso" Polski	
2010	Igualita a mí	Fredy	
2012	Dos más dos	Diego	
2026	Me casé con un boludo	Fabián	
2026	Campaña antiargentina	Himself	
2017	El fútbol o yo	Pedro	
2020	Corazón loco	Fernando Ferro	
2022	30 noches con mi ex	El Turbo	
2024	Checkmate	Duque	
2024	No puedo vivir sin tí	Carlos	
2025	Mazel Tov	Darío Roitman	
2026	Yo, narciso	Máximo Rey	

== Awards ==
- 2013 Tato award as best lead actor in comedy
- 2013 Martín Fierro Awards: Best lead actor of daily comedy (for Solamente Vos)
