= List of Casi Ángeles characters =

The following are characters in the Argentine television series Casi Ángeles, which aired from 2007 to 2010 by Telefe. Casi Angeles, which means almost angels, is the story of a teenage rock bank, Teen Angels.

== Characters ==
=== Majors ===
- Ángeles Inchausti/ Cielo Mágico (Emilia Attias) is twenty years old, and the daughter of Alba and Carlos María. Bartolomé and Justina abandoned her in the forest and from there was raised in a circus, with the name Cielo Mágico (Magic Sky) that her adoptive parents gave her. Soon, in the Season 1, Cielo found out that Bartolomé y Justina were the people that ruined her life. She was threatened by Bartolomé to say nothing that he mistreats the kids in the home. Cielo was the condition of possibility for the children to live. She formed a band with Mar, Jazmín, Tacho, Rama y Thiago — Teen Angels. At the end of the season, Cielo is absorbed by the clock in the mansion and goes to another level.
- Nicolás "Nico" Bauer (Nicolás Vázquez) is thirty years old, and the son of Berta and Luis. He is a young doctor of archeology that goes to the mansion for his commitment to Malvina Bedoya Agüero, Bartó's sister. However, Nico fell in love with Cielo. They became lovers, but he soon found out that Malvina, who is not as wicked as his brother Bartolomé, was pregnant. She gave a birth to their daughter Ezperanza (hope). At the season, he and Cielo adopted Monito.
- Bartoloméo Abdón "Bart" Bedoya Agüero (Alejo García Pintos) is the principal of the orphanage, the BB foundation. He exploited the children, beat them, made them work, thus made money, and was a murderer and a criminal, buying judges, police and all sorts of important people as long as they do not snitch. After Cielo found out he was a criminal, Bartó threatened that something might happen to the kids if she told something. However, Cielo said everything to Nico. Finally, Bartó was imprisoned, but he soon escaped. While attempting to kill Cielo, the clock throws a ray of light, leaving him in coma.
- Marianella "Mar" Rinaldi (Lali Espósito) is 17 years old, and the daughter of Julia and Mauro. She is an orphan who went through many reformatories before reaching the mansion at the beginning of history. She was the most hated by Justina and Bartolomé, who would make life impossible. At first Mar was "butch", sullen, suspicious and resentful tomboyish teenager. But then that aspect gave way to a nice girl, happy and full of life. Mar fell in love with Thiago, the son of Barto. Both of them believed they were meant for each other but they always had "shocks." After years of searching, Mar met her biological mother Julia, but soon left her, after Julia found a job in Spain. Then her half–sister Tefi came to live at the mansion with her.
- Jazmín Romero (María Eugenia Suárez) is fifteen years old. She is born into a Gypsy family, lived to age of six with her parents, and then was banished with them for a confrontation with Joselo, a gypsy enemy. Soon they died, and the murderer seemed to be Joselo, but Jaz soon discovered that the culprit was another. Then Jaz came in the orphanage of Bartolomé. She liked to flirt, however not to "mary" none of the boys. Jaz seduced few boys and hurt the others. At first she had to choose between two passions; one was Nacho, a domineering millionaire who can offer luxury and wealth, and the other is Tacho, poor as she was, but capable of making thousands of romantic things for her. After a while, it was Tacho who made it to the heart of the Gypsy girl.
- Thiago Bedoya Agüero Blaquier (Juan Pedro Lanzani) is sixteen years old, and is the son of Juan Cruz and Ornella, but was brought up by Bartolomé. Bartó had never shown the reality of his orphanage and Thiago would gradually aware of the reality. He was studying in London, but grew tired and returned to Argentina. When Thiago met Mar, he immediately fell in love with her. However, he was always going to have confusion about their feelings. Eventually, he began a relationship with Melody Paz, which made end his relationship with Mar. Thiago then misses Mar and they get back together.
- Juan "Tacho" Morales (Nicolás Riera) is sixteen years old. He came from a very poor family with many children and was raised in the street, at the door of a theater. Tacho then arrived at the orphanage of Bartolomé. He fell in love with Jazmín and tried to win her love perseveringly. Tacho struggled to win her over, but also had a problem as his enemy was Nacho, who came from a rich family. However, Tacho manages to win Jazmín's heart.
- Ramiro "Rama" Ordóñez (Gastón Dalmau) is fifteen years old, and is the son of Rosalí. He is smart, educated and talented. Rama adores music, so integrates the Teen Angels. He is the older brother of Alelí and always tries to take care of her like a father, since their mother abandoned them. Rama reunited with his mother, but she rejected him cruelly.
- León "Lleca" Benítez (Stéfano de Gregorio) is twelve years old, and is the son of Mercedes and Macelo. After his birth, he was separated from his parents and lived in the street. They eventually found him and nicknamed him Lleca.
- Justina "Tina" Merarda García (Julia Calvo) was the principal partner and had a child hidden under the house. Tina named this girl Luz. Like Bartolomé, she mistreats the orphans like Bartolome, but she also has a sensitive side, all that because Luz would not pass anything. When Bartolomé was arrested, Tina would also prey. She is in love with him and will do whatever he wants her to do.
- Malvina Bernardeth Bedoya Agüero (Gimena Accardi) is the sister of Bartolomé, who called her "Bólida". Malvina is innocent, although she sometimes did bad things. She loved Nico with all her heart, but did not like Cielo crossing her way. In the end she ended up nice, with the help of Nico y Cielo. She had an airplane accident together with Nicos son Cristóbal when she wanted to leave to another country with Marcos.

=== Supporting Season 1 ===
- Ignacho "Nacho" Perez Alzamendi (Agustín Sierra) Thiago son is a friend of the court Alzamendi Perez, woo girls several times above Jazmin and Caridad.
- Estefania "Tefi" Rinaldi (Candela Vetrano) is the sister of Mar, Thiago, and Nacho missing friend always compared to her sister and Jazmin, with Caridad and Valeria. Do not know who are her real parents as her mother Sandra Mar was adopted.
- Cristobal "Cris" Bauer (Tomas Ross) is the eight-year-old son Nico, but her real father is Ibarlucia Marcos, is a living encyclopedia, it becomes the boyfriend of Luz and the best friend a warning.
- Mateo "Monito" Bauer (Nazareno Antòn) has eight years and is the best friend Cristobal always eat bananas when the time is not the end of the first series Nico and take the Cielo.
- Luz Inchausti (Florencia Cagnasso) is the younger sister of Cielo, the children of Maria Alba and Carlos. Justina the contained within a secret room and does not reveal its existence to anyone. Becomes the girlfriend of Cristobal.
- Aleli Ordonez (Guadalupe Antòn) is the younger sister of Rama, and is in love with Lleca. is the younger sister of Rama, and is in love with Lleca. His favorite tale is Aladdin.
- Marcos "Marco" Bauer (Lucas Ferraro) Cristobal is the biological father, the brother of Nico. Nico hates, Berta and her father. He died at the end of the first series, has had a relationship with Cielo and another with Malvina.
- Mogli (Gerardo Chendo) Nico is the quirky friends, shown only in the first series and is grateful to Nico because he saved him.

=== Supporting Season 2 ===
- Simon Arrechavaleta (Pablo Martinez) Thiago's other friend that appears in the second season and is in love with Mar.
- Melody "Mel" Paz (Maria Del Cerro) is the best friend of Tefi and is very bad and with Tefi combines Zinzan between Mar, Thiago, Simon. Not shown in the first season.
- Valeria "Vale" Gutierrez (Rocio Igarzabal) is a girl who Luz meets when she wanted to escape from a reformatory, Rama became madly in love with Valeria and Nico persuades the court in order Valeria to stay for a month in the foundation.
- Caridad Martina Cuesta\Masquerade (Daniela Aita) is a shy and naive girl who comes from the countryside and is teased by Tefi and Melody.
- Luca Francini (Victorio D'Alessandro) is a guy who is part of the CC Corporation and is the foundation to see Nico and teen angels.
- Franka Mayerhold (Manuela Pal) is in command of the CC Corporation was murdered by Juan Cruz.
- Tic Tac (Peto Menanhem) is the keeper of the clock, where heaven ends is very stern and give a lot of valuable aid to Heaven, son of Mar and Thiago
- Salvador Quiroga Harms (Nicolàs Pauls) is a friend of Nico. Helps Nico find Cristobal and Malvina to leave the forest.
- Camilo estrella (Mariano Torres), en la 3ª temporada, (y juancruz, en la anterior)

=== Supporting Season 3 ===
- Martina Perez Alsamendi (Camila Martani) She is daughter of Nacho and Caridad.
- Luna Vörg (Paula Reca) she is a student at Mandalay College. Shy and innocent, she inspires feelings of protection in others. She and her twin brother, Pedro, were found in Hong Kong by a couple, who adopted them and took them to Venezuela.

=== Guest stars ===
- Cacho of Buenos Aires (Benjamin Rojas) appears only in the final episode of the first series and has good advice for teen angel
- Esperanza "Hope" Bauer (Jimena Baron) She is sister of Paz, Cristobal, Torito and Monito.
