= Peter Lanzani =

Argentine actor and singer (born 1990)

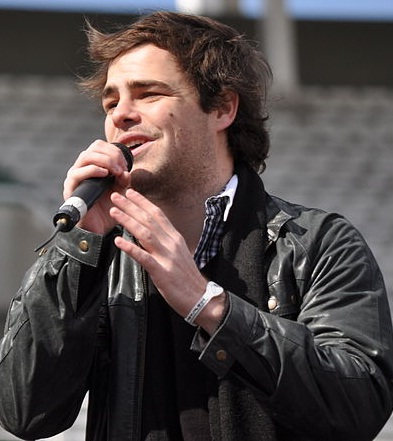
- Lanzani in 2011
- Born: 24 August 1990 (age 35); Buenos Aires, Argentina
- Other names: Juan Pedro Lanzani
- Occupations: Actor, singer, model
- Years active: 2006–present

Juan Pedro "Peter" Lanzani (born 24 August 1990) is an Argentine actor and singer and former child model. He is best known for his role on the Cris Morena television series Casi Ángeles playing Thiago Bedoya Agüero, and as a member of the music group Teen Angels. He is also known for his roles in Argentina 1985 by Santiago Mitre and El Clan by Pablo Trapero.

== Early life ==
Juan Pedro Lanzani was born on August 24, 1990, in the Belgrano neighborhood of Buenos Aires. He studied at the Belgrano Day School and at the Annunciation of María Institute. He has three brothers. Lanzani used to play rugby in the Rugby team 'Alumni' during childhood, like his father and brothers, but although he dropped it due to his pursuit of an actor career, he still plays occasionally in his free time.

== Career ==
In 2004, began his career as a model for Mimo & Co. In 2006, made his television debut playing Tábano on the Argentine series Chiquititas produced by Cris Morena, starring Jorgelina Aruzzi and Gaston Ricaud, which aired on Telefe.

In 2007 to 2010, Lanzani played the title role of Thiago Bedoya Agüero in Casi Angeles. The series, which became one of the most popular programs on television, was also adapted for theater. Performances were held at the Gran Rex Theater, where it broke box office records and became "the second most seen play in the history of Argentine theater." In a survey conducted in the electronic version of the Argentine newspaper La Nación, Peter Lanzani was chosen as the "best of the small screen heartthrob 2010".

In 2011, he played opposite Facundo Arana in the comedy Cuando Me Sonreís.

In 2012, Lanzani played Eliseo Lacroix, grandson of the protagonist (Mirtha Legrand), in the miniseries La Dueña. The series began in April and ended in November of that year. In June 2012, he made a special appearance on the telenovela Dulce Amor, starring Carina Zampini and Sebastian Estevanez, in where he played Fede. The series began its run in April and ended in November of the same year.

The following year, Lanzani received a proposal from Cris Morena, who gave him his first job in television to star in the series Aliados which started airing on Telefe in June 2013.

In 2015 he filmed his first movie with Guillermo Francella; The Clan. It is inspired by a notorious true-life crime syndicate, the Puccio family.

=== Musical career ===
Acting in Casi Angeles led to Lanzani becoming a member of the pop band Teen Angels, formed by the main cast of the series: Lali Espósito, Eugenia Suárez (later replaced by Rocío Igarzábal), Nicolas Riera and Gastón Dalmau.

== Filmography ==
Year	Title	Role	Director
2013	Teen Angels: El Adiós	Thiago bedoya/himself	Juan Manuel Jiménez
2015	The Clan	Alejandro Puccio	Pablo Trapero
2017	Los últimos	Pedro	Nicolás Puenzo
2017	Hipersomnia	Rino	Gabriel Grieco
2017	You Only Live Once	Leonardo Andrade	Federico Cueva
2018	El ángel	Miguel Prieto	Luis Ortega
2019	4x4	Ciro	Mariano Cohn
2022	Argentina, 1985	Luis Moreno Ocampo	Santiago Mitre
2025	Heads or Tails?		Alessio Rigo de Righi, Matteo Zoppis

== Theater ==
Year	Title	Role	Theater
2006	Chiquititas	Nicolás "Tábano" Ramírez	Teatro Gran Rex
2007–2010	Casi ángeles	Thiago Bedoya Agüero	Teatro Gran Rex
2011–2012	Teen Angels	Él mismo	Teatro Gran Rex
2013	Camila, nuestra historia de amor	Ladislao Gutiérrez	Teatro Lola Membrives
2014	El club del hit	Él mismo	Teatro Tabarís
2014	Fuerzabruta	"El corredor"	Centro Cultural Recoleta
2014	Casi Normales	Henry	Teatro Tabarís
2014	Señores y señores del musical	Él mismo	Teatro Gran Rex
2014	Aliados	Noah García Iturbe	Teatro Gran Rex
2015–2016	Equus	Alan Strang	El Galpón De Guevara / Teatro Auditorium
2017	El emperador Gynt	Pedro Gynt	El Cultural San Martín

== Discography ==
Year	Title
2007	Teen Angels 1
2008	Teen Angels 2
2008	Casi Ángeles en vivo teatro Gran Rex 2008
2009	Teen Angels 3
2009	Casi Ángeles en vivo teatro Gran Rex 2009
2010	Teen Angels 4
2010	TeenAngels La Historia
2011	Teen Angels 5
2012	Teen Angels La Despedida
2013	Camila: El Musical
2013	Aliados
2014	Aliados 2

== Awards and nominations ==
Year	Award	Category	Nominee/work	Result	Ref.
2013	Kids' Choice Awards Argentina	Actor favorito	Aliados	Ganador	
2013	Premios Martín Fierro	Intérprete de cortina musical	Aliados	Nominado	
2014	Kids' Choice Awards Argentina	Actor favorito	Aliados	Ganador	
2015	Kids' Choice Awards Argentina	Bombón	El mismo	Nominado	
2015	Premios Sur	Mejor actor	El clan	Nominado	
2015	Premios Sur	Mejor actor revelación	El clan	Ganador	
2016	Premios Cóndor de Plata	Revelación Masculina	El clan	Ganador	
2016	Premios María Guerrero	Mejor actor revelación	Equus	Ganador	
2016	Premios Florencio Sánchez	Mejor actor revelación	Equus	Ganador	
2016	Premios Trinidad Guevara	Revelación Masculina	Equus	Ganador	
2016	Premios Ace	Revelación Masculina	Equus	Ganador	
