= Mujeres de nadie =

- Genre: Telenovela; Drama
- Created by: Adrián Suar
- Directed by: Victor Stella; Alejandro Ibáñez
- Starring: First season: Agustina Cherri; Susú Pecoraro; Luis Luque; Claribel Medina; Federico Olivera; Alejandro Awada; María Leal; Second season: Luisa Kuliok; Carlos Calvo; Laura Novoa; Eugenia Tobal; Juan Palomino; Lucía Galán; Antonio Grimau; Virginia Lago; Ana María Picchio
- Opening theme: Mujer de nadie by Paz Martínez
- Country of origin: Argentina
- Original language: Spanish
- No. of episodes: 316

Production
- Executive producer: César Markus González
- Production location: Argentina
- Running time: 60 minutes
- Production company: Pol-ka

Original release
- Network: El Trece
- Release: 10 May 2007 – 17 November 2008

Related
- Collar De Esmeraldas

Mujeres de nadie (Women of Nobody) is an Argentine telenovela produced by Pol-ka and broadcast by El Trece from May 10, 2007, to November 17, 2008. The show tells the story of a group of nurses and medical doctors.

== Cast ==
=== First season ===
- Agustina Cherri as Laura "Lali" Garreto
- Susú Pecoraro as Ana Ortega
- María Leal as Margarita "Marga" Vega (Amalia Campos)
- Claribel Medina as Lucrecia "Mimí" Montesi
- Luis Luque as Dr. Guillermo Gutiérrez
- Alejandro Awada as Juan Carlos Rossi
- Federico Olivera as Dr. Pablo Medina
- Dalma Milebo as María Teresa "Marita" Linares
- Fabiana García Lago as Giselle
- Campi as José "Pepe" Gatica
- Gonzalo Heredia as Rolando "Rolo" Peréz
- Florencia Otero as Eugenia Gutiérrez
- Lucía Pecrul as Malena Oltegui
- Laura Miller as Julia Almada
- Víctor Hugo Vieyra as Gregorio Almada
- Juan Manuel Tenuta as Atilio "Don Atilio" Montesi
- María Ibarreta as Elsa Oltegui
- Ana María Picchio as Zulema Nilda Garreto
- Daniel Miglioranza as Dr. Pedro Arizmendi
- Florencia Raggi as Dra. Lucía Estrada
- Antonio Ugo as Leopoldo
- Paola Papini as Cecilia
- Alicia Aller as Teresa
- Ezequiel Rodríguez as Octavio
- Mónica Gazpio as Estella
- Fernando Sayago as Marcelo
- Verónica Vieyra as Mercedes Jáuregui
- Norman Briski as Manuel Linares
- Santiago Ramundo as Claudio Mendizábal
- Jean Pierre Noher as Dr. Franco Mendizábal
- Roxana Canne as Lidia
- Julieta Novarro as Brenda
- Fabián Abecasis as Ramón
- Javier Heit as Pedro

=== Second season ===
- Luisa Kuliok as Raquel Vidal
- Laura Novoa as Virginia Longoni
- Lucía Galán as Carmen "Gallega" Muleiro
- Eugenia Tobal as Cecilia Santillán
- Carlos Calvo as Diego Porta
- Juan Palomino as Santiago Gancedo and Nacho Gancedo (Villain)
- Antonio Grimau as Eduardo "Tato" Canedo (Villain)
- Virginia Lago as Nené Fiore Vda. de Longoni (Main villain)
- Ana María Picchio as Zulema Garreto
- María Socas as Dolores de Porta (Villain)
- Federico Amador as Andrés Iglesias
- Campi as José "Pepe" Gatica
- María Dupláa as María Guzmán
- Azul Lombardía as Bárbara
- Silvana Sosto as Nilda Gallo
- Miguel Habud as Javier Barón (Villain)
- Luciano Cazaux as Inspector Randazzo
- Norberto Díaz as Emilio Kessler (Villain)
- Susana Lanteri as Pocha
- Adrián Yospe as Cristian (Villain)
- Ornella Fazio as Martita
- Jorge Sassi as Felipe Malfati
- Christian Sancho as Miguel Salerno
- Carina Zampini as Fernanda Almirón
- Valeria Lorca as Irene
- Sergio Surraco as Rafael
- Paula Siero as Mónica
- Victoria Vanucci as Isabel
- Lydia Lamaison as Elisa
- Patricia Viggiano as Nora Furkat (Villain)
- Federico Barón as Diego Porta (child)
- Javier Gómez as Juan Pablo
- Mónica Galán as Rosario
- Norberto Gonzalo as Escalada
- Florencia Ortiz as Belén
- Coraje Abalos as Rodrigo Morales
- Lorena Meritano as Julia
- Luis Sabatini as Bordón

== Awards and nominations ==
=== Awards ===
- Premios Clarín Espectáculos 2007
  - Best telenovela
  - Susú Pecoraro - Best drama actress
  - Luis Luque - Best drama actor
  - Gonzalo Heredia - Revelation
- Premios Martín Fierro 2007
  - Best telenovela
  - Best telenovela actor: Luis Luque
  - Best telenovela actress: Susú Pecoraro
  - Best telenovela theme: Mujer de nadie by Paz Martínez
- Premios Clarín Espectáculos 2008
  - Best drama fiction
- Premios Martín Fierro 2008
  - Virginia Lago: Best supporting actress in drama

=== Nominations ===
- Premios Martín Fierro 2007
  - Best telenovela actor: Alejandro Awada
  - Best telenovela actress: María Leal and Claribel Medina
  - Best actor: Juan Manuel Tenuta
  - Best actress: Ana María Picchio
  - Special participation: Norman Briski
- Premios Clarín 2007
  - Best screenplays - Ernesto Korovsky, Marcos Carnevale and Sebastian Parrota
  - Best actress in drama - María Leal
- Premios Martín Fierro 2008
  - Best telenovela
  - Juan Palomino: Best telenovela actor
  - Laura Novoa: Best telenovela actress
  - Ana María Picchio: Best actress in drama
