= Hombres de honor =

2005 Argentine telenovela

Hombres de honor (Spanish: Men of honor) is a 2005 Argentine telenovela, produced by Pol-Ka and aired by El Trece. It starred Laura Novoa and Gabriel Corrado.

== Premise ==
Hombres de Honor was produced by Pol-Ka in an attempt to emulate the success of Padre Coraje, a telenovela they had produced the previous year. It had a low ratings, but El Trece aired it anyway, refusing to cancel it. The last episode, with 14,7 rating points, had the highest rating of the program's history.

== Plot ==
The action is set in Argentina in the 1940s. There are two mafia families, the Patter Nostra and the Onoratto, who control the traffic of alcoholic beverages and gambling, and wage territorial disputes in other areas, such as prostitution. Luca Onoratto (Gabriel Corrado), jailed for the murder of Carlo Andrea Patter Nostra's twin brother (Gerardo Romano), served his time in prison. The Patter Nostra killed Lorenzo Onoratto (Arturo Puig), Luca's parent, during his wedding. Luca tried to be accepted as the head of the family, and secretly loved María Grazzia Patter Nostra (Laura Novoa), the daughter of the rival don.

== Cast ==
- Gabriel Corrado as Luca Onoratto
- Laura Novoa as María Grazia Patter Nostra
- Leonor Benedetto as Alberta Natale de Onoratto
- Arturo Puig as Don Lorenzo Onoratto
- Gerardo Romano as Carlo Andrea Patter Nostra
- Juan Gil Navarro as Rocco Onoratto/Patter Nostra
- Virginia Innocenti as Mónica Catalano
- Agustina Cherri as Ángela Capello/Patter Nostra
- Antonio Grimau as Comissair Mario Brusca
- Selva Alemán as Carmela Catalano
- Carina Zampini as Eva Hoffman
- Carlos Portaluppi as Pío Molinaro
- Alejandro Awada as Renato De Luca
- Roberto Vallejos as Silvio Urzi
- Carlos Kaspar as Dino Onoratto
- David Masajnik as Bruno Anselmo
- Fabiana García Lago as Amelia Bongiorno
- Andrea Galante as Bella Brusca/La Loba
- Lucas Ferraro as Danilo Onoratto
- Marina Glezer as Beatrice Rossinni
- Valeria Lorca as Andrea
- Sergio Surraco as Ciro Patter Nostra
- Elena Roger as Gabriela Onoratto
- Jorge Nolasco as Nelo Calvi
- Elvira Vicario as Stella Capello
- Beatriz Thibaudin as Anunciata Patter Nostra "La Nona"
- Magela Zanotta as Franca
- Sandra Guida as La Madama
