= Dulce amor =

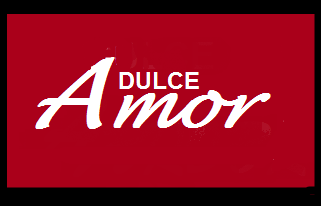
- Genre: Romance; Comedy drama
- Created by: Enrique Estevanez
- Written by: Enrique Estevanez; Marcelo Nacci; Laura Barneix; Julián Rimondino; Claudia Fagaburu; Pablo Finamore; Natalia Torres
- Directed by: Mauro Scandolari; Hugo Alejandro Moser
- Starring: Sebastián Estevanez; Juan Darthés; Carina Zampini; Rocío Igarzábal; Nicolás Riera
- Opening theme: Dulce amor by Puentes
- Country of origin: Argentina
- Original language: Spanish
- No. of seasons: 1
- No. of episodes: 301

Production
- Executive producer: Pablo Ferreiro
- Producer: Ángel de Bonis
- Production location: Martínez, Buenos Aires
- Running time: 60 minutes
- Production company: L.C. Acción Producciones

Original release
- Network: Telefe
- Release: January 23, 2012 – April 29, 2013

Related
- El elegido; Mi amor, mi amor

Dulce amor (International title: Candy Love) is an Argentine telenovela co-produced by L.C. Acción Producciones and Telefe. It began broadcasting January 23, 2012 from Monday to Friday at 10:30 p.m. until April 29, 2013. Then, due to the incorporation of new programs, their schedule was delayed, broadcasting at 11:15 p.m. In January 2013, it changed to 10:15 p.m. Finally, in March 2013, the series returned to his original schedule of 10:45 p.m. The date of the final chapter was April 29, 2013, after 301 chapters and 15 months on screen. The final chapter was broadcast live from the Teatro Gran Rex hosted by Alejandro Wiebe. Starring Sebastián Estevanez, Juan Darthés and Carina Zampini. Co-starring Rocío Igarzábal and Nicolás Riera. The antagonistic participations of Segundo Cernadas, Laura Novoa, Sol Estevanez and the first actor Gerardo Romano. The star performances by the first actors María Valenzuela, Jorge Sassi, Georgina Barbarossa, Arturo Bonín and Graciela Pal. And it has the special participation of Calu Rivero.

== Plot ==
The Bandi sisters, owners of a very famous candy factory, face one of their worst moments. Victoria (Carina Zampini) is in charge of the company and is Lorenzo's girlfriend (Segundo Cernadas), the man who, without Victoria knowing, does nothing but work to make him fall empire. However, the turns of life make Marcos (Sebastián Estevanez), a former car racer, become the driver of this woman without joy. The arrival of this man in the family will change the fate of the Bandi, at all possible levels. Julián (Juan Darthés) is a friend of Marcos, together they spend every free hour preparing the race car that Marcos runs. When the unexpected closure of the workshop where they work leaves him in the street, Julian follows in the footsteps of Marcos and becomes driver of Victoria's sister, Natacha (Calu Rivero), a beautiful woman fifteen years younger, which will drive him crazy and generate several problems in his marriage to Gabriela (Laura Novoa).

== Cast ==
=== Protagonists ===
- Marcos Guerrero (Sebastián Estevanez) He is seductive, sincere, impulsive and lover of adventure and extreme adrenaline. Funny and optimistic, accustomed to paddling as a boy. He is happy with little. He doesn't care what they will say and is true to what he likes. It is the heartthrob of the neighborhood and all the girls sigh when they see it happen. He is very sweet with women and if he did not sit down, it is because he did not know the right woman yet. He marries Victoria and has two children with her.
- Julián Giménez (Juan Darthés) He is Marcos's best friend, he is the typical neighborhood man, but modern. Disbelieved of the marriage, he went to live with his pregnant girlfriend, Gabriela. He has an 8-year-old son, Mariano. He is handsome, seductive without trying, owner of a presence and a bearing that stand out in any field. Very masculine, handsome man, with a strong and seductive voice. He falls in love with Natacha, but finally he stays with Gisela, with whom he has a son.
- Victoria Bandi Ferri / Victoria Fernández Ferri (Carina Zampini) She is the heiress of the Bandi candy emporium, the largest in the country. When her father Octavio died he was in charge of the company. She is very beautiful, but somewhat rigid, elegant and sensual. Very cultured, lover of music and the arts in general. Honest and noble heart is very respected. She is tremendously demanding with men and with people in general. Her father is actually Pepe. Victoria ends up being the boss of Golosinas Bandi, marrying Marcos and has two children with him.

=== Co-protagonists ===
- Brenda Bandi Ferri (Rocío Igarzábal) She is the youngest of the Bandi sisters. Sweet, good and rebellious. She is 17, and is in her last year of high school. Brenda meets Lucas casually, who she will fall in love with.
- Lucas Pedroso González (Nicolás Riera) He is Rosa's grandson, the cook of the Bandi family. In order to help his grandmother financially, he works to steal or carry out some scams. Lucas meet Brenda, without knowing that she is part of the Bandi family, and while she is hiding it they begin a romance.

=== Antagonists ===
- Pedro Lorenzo Amador (Segundo Cernadas) He is the great villain in the story and Victoria's boyfriend. Elegant, handsome, athletic, touching the metrosexual, owner of an excessive and obsessive wardrobe. Fine and distinguished by force of effort, of seeking to belong. Terribly ambitious. He is the general manager of the company where he started from below and quickly raised to the highest he could reach, but he still has bigger ambitions. Lorenzo is a two-faced guy with a fake smile, cunning as few. He ends up in prison.
- Gabriela Ahumada (Laura Novoa) She is the great villain of the story, Julián's wife and Pepe's niece. A beautiful woman, very sexual, but somewhat careless. It has a very neighborhood look, special days are arranged and lately nothing seems special or worthy of celebration. She used to be cheerful, but it went off. Her path is to accept defeat, and stop thinking about it a little to think about his son and see the damage he is doing to use it against Julian. At the same time, find at thirty-something what she wants to do in her life as well as being a wife and mother. Gabriela ends up being the Victoria's right hand in Golosinas Bandi.
- Ángeles "Angie" Green (Sol Estevanez) Bandi factory employee and "friend" of Victoria. She is a pretty serious woman with a bad character. She is in love with Lorenzo and for that reason, she joins him in his plans to sink the factory and the Bandi family.
- Francisco José Montalbán (Gerardo Romano) He is the great villain of the story. He is the man behind a real estate business and who used Lorenzo to break the Golosinas Bandi Company. His main objective is to take revenge on the Bandi family after a betrayal he suffered in the past from Octavio. He falls in love with Victoria and does his best to separate her from Marcos. He tries to kill Ángeles for revenge, and he is murdered in cold blood by Lorenzo, but still appears in the body of a ghost for Lorenzo.

=== Recurring cast ===
- Elena Ferri de Bandi (María Valenzuela) She is the mother of Victoria, Natacha and Brenda. A woman with superb and overprotective character with her daughters despite the fact that they are already older. She hides from Victoria the truth about her biological father so as not to lose the company and, with Lorenzo's help, she lies telling her that her father is Ramón Urrutia, a neighbor of the neighborhood that already deceased. But when Victoria is in love with Marcos while he waits for a son with Noelia, she is forced to confess the truth, and reveals to her daughter that her father is Pepe.
- Emilio Mejía (Jorge Sassi) Bandi family butler. Sick, gossiping, friendly and very buddy with Elena and her daughters. He is always faithful to the Bandi. He is a man who is guided by passion and advises Elena's daughters to do what their hearts tell them. In the last chapter he meets again with the love of his life.
- Natacha Bandi Ferri (Calu Rivero) Beautiful, attractive, sexy, fresh, funny, and at the same time very liar. She built her personality and her ego being the "Bandi girl" for 10 years. She also made an image of herself with which she has always sought to be consistent.
- Florencia Guerrero (Micaela Vázquez) Isabel's daughter and Marcos's sister. She was the third in discord in the couple of Brenda and Lucas. Upon being fired by Victoria, she begins working as a presidential secretary. Unwittingly she falls in love with her boss, Lorenzo. Then there was a discord between the two, since Ángeles had also maintained an intimate relationship with Lorenzo, and they ended up separating, leaving Florencia pregnant.
- Ciro Montalbán Montero (Santiago Ramundo) He is the teacher who will give school support to Brenda and from there he will try to conquer her, having many questions with Lucas. Ciro is also the son of Montalbán and joins his plans for taking over the company, but without knowing everything that was hidden behind.
- Lola Rodríguez (Eva De Dominici) She is Terco's cousin and helps to attend the bar. She falls in love with Lucas with whom she has a brief relationship. She finally returns to her city because she missed her family.
- Luciana Rivero (Vanesa González) She is the nurse and kinesiologist who takes care of Victoria since her accident, there she meets Marcos and falls in love with him.
- Diego Vázquez (Nicolás Furtado) He is employed at the Terco bar, is a musician and very outgoing. Take every opportunity to try your luck with every girl that appears.
- Leonardo Espósito (Fabio Di Tomaso) ex-boyfriend of Noelia. Surprise Noelia, upon arriving in Buenos Aires, Argentina asking for financial help and lodging. Work and live in the Terco bar momentarily. Finally they turn to the south together after knowing that he is the father of Noelia's baby.
- Isabel Fontana de Guerrero (Georgina Barbarossa) She is the mother of Marcos and Florencia. She is a neighborhood woman who makes a living by giving dance classes to older women. She is very nice, funny and a proud mother of her children.
- José "Pepe" Fernández (Arturo Bonin) Victoria's biological father. He is also Noelia's father and Gabriela's uncle. He owns a kiosk in front of the Bandi company, but then his daughter Victoria makes him the new Chocolate Master of the Bandi company. He is a slightly grumpy man who cares about the people he loves and who still loves Elena even though they have been together for 35 years.
- Noelia Fernández (Mercedes Oviedo) Pepe's daughter. A beautiful woman, lawyer and independent. She is Marcos's ex-girlfriend, who comes back to his life after a long time to help him. Some time after she returned to Buenos Aires, Argentina from the south, Leonardo, a boyfriend she had in the south, reappears in her life. Soon he returns with Marcos and "gets pregnant with him", although in reality the son she expects is from Leonardo. After confessing the whole truth, she returns to the South with Leonardo.
- Rosa Pedroso (Graciela Pal) It's Lucas's paternal grandmother. A humble woman who comes from Rosario, Santa Fe Province, Argentina with her grandson and tries to make a living as a cook. She has health problems that complicate her work but she does the impossible to maintain herself. 15 years ago she had an affair with Isabel's husband and with him she went to live in Rosario, Santa Fe Province, Argentina, where she began working as a cook for the Montalban. She leaves when she meets an entrepreneur and he offers her an important job as a pastry teacher in a very important restaurant in Capilla del Monte.
- Alcides "Máquina" Castro (Esteban Prol) Bandi factory employee. Friend of Marcos and Julián. He is a nice, very curious, friendly man who loves women but has no luck with them. At first he was in love with Ángeles and thought he was Lorenzo's faithful friend. But he finally fell in love with Connie, Natacha's friend, and they end up getting married.
- Mariano "Nano" Giménez (Franco Pucci) Son of Ernesto and Gabriela. He thinks Julián is his biological father, but he is not. He is 8 years old and loves Taekwondo. He is suffering for all the crazy things his mother is doing.
- Alejandra González (María Fernanda Callejón) She is Lucas's mother, who makes her appearance in the neighborhood looking for her son after almost 20 years. She is in love with Terco, she is the new chef of the bar and she helps him attend.
- Gisela Martínez (Florencia Ortiz) Montalbán's right hand, takes her position very seriously and imposes herself with dominant attitudes. But a surprise awaits Gisela, in the factory she meets Julián, her old boyfriend. She will debate between her love and keep her job. She ends up with Julián, with whom she has a son.
- Santiago Barrios (Christian Sancho) He is the head of security of Montalbán. He is the businessman's trusted man, even more so than his own son. Hides a great love for his co-worker Gisela.
- Maite Rivero (Malena Sánchez) She is Luciana's sister, friend of Brenda and Lucas. Maite will fall in love with Bruno, Marcos and Florencia's half brother.
- Bruno Guerrero (Nicolás Zuviría) is the half brother of Marcos and Florencia, who arrives in the neighborhood in search of Vicente, his father. He is a musician and singer and lived in Santa Fe Province, Argentina.
- Rodolfo Somoza (Claudio Santorelli) He is the police commissioner, and it is he who helps Marcos to investigate the events that occurred in the neighborhood and the factory. He falls in love with Isabel with whom he begins a relationship.
- Daniel "Terco" Rodríguez (Hernán Estevanez) Friend of all and owner of the bar in the neighborhood of Marcos and Julián. He is in love with Alejandra, Lucas's mother.
- Rosendo Álvarez (Diego Armel) He is the head of security of the company of the Bandi family.
- Connie / Carola (Gabriela Sari) She is Natacha's best friend, with whom she is part of the company's Marketing department. It is fun and funny. He marries Machine. Carola is the twin sister and they have a totally different personality, she is fine and seductive, and she presents herself as Julian's blind date. She enes up falling in love with Alcides, and they end up getting married.

=== Participations ===
- Paula Paredes (Mónica Ayos) She is Nano's nanny and is in love with Julián.
- Facundo Green (Francisco Andrade) He is the brother of Ángeles, who rehabilitated the drugs enters the mansion of the Bandi as maintenance personnel under the name of Pablo Espinoza to be able to realize his revenge against Elena. He falls in love with Brenda to the point of kidnapping her.
- Vicente Guerrero (Cacho Castaña) He is the father of Marcos and Florencia, and Isabel's husband. He left home when his children were young and returned claiming money. He is a very womanizing guy, and the ladies of the neighborhood are in love with him. He suffered a disease and then dies.
- Ofelia Molina (Mimí Ardú) She is Bruno's mother, Marcos and Florencia's half brother.
- Ernesto (Diego Rafecas) He is Nano's biological father and is a prisoner. He asks Gabriela to meet his son before he dies.
- Dr. Freire (Horacio Peña) He is Victoria's lawyer and he is in charge of the legal issues that she asks for both factory and personal.
- Delfina (Jimena Sabaris) She is Brenda's best friend and classmate. She always covers it when Brenda has to see Lucas behind Elena.
- Agustín Renzi (Fabián Talín) He is Lorenzo's cousin and partner of Montalbán. He has a real estate agency in which Gabriela worked and wants to buy the properties of the neighbors of the neighborhood.
- Freddy Di Marco (Gastón Ricaud) He is the representative and boyfriend for Natacha's convenience. He blackmails her all the time to get money.
- Gonzalo "Gonzalito" Ferrero (Alfredo Castellani) He is a neighbor of the neighborhood, and it is he who drives Lucas to steal and participate in fights for bets. He is hired by Lorenzo to sabotage the company.
- Teresa "Teresita" Montero (Silvia Pérez) She is the mother of Ciro and ex-wife of Montalbán. She has been friends with Elena for a long time and for reasons of distance they had stopped being treated. She is the one who recommends Ciro as Brenda's teacher. She is a person who drowns her sorrows in alcoholic drinks and they think she is crazy.
- Rocco "Maestro" Bonfatti (Humberto Serrano) He was the chocolate teacher since the factory was founded, after obtaining Pepe's recipes. He is the only one who knew Elena's secret.
- Julio Amador (Jorge Horacio Martínez) He is Lorenzo's father, but he always denied it due to personal problems.
- Maxi Vargas (Maximiliano Zago) He is one of the employees of the factory, and is the one who helps organize the rest of the employees to defend the bankruptcy of the factory and form the work cooperative. He actually works for Montalbán but nobody knows.
- Nicolás López (Guillermo Pfening) He is the doctor who attends Marcos at the clinic, he is Luciana's ex-boyfriend and still feels things for her.
- Carmen (Miriam Lanzoni) She is the maid of the Bandi family, she is a bit clumsy and doesn't know how to cook. She decides to resign from her position to continue with her Reiki courses.
- Tincho (Matías Scarvaci) He is Natacha's manager, and he is the one who gets her the roles in the movies. He also helps Lucas get contracts with record companies.
- Sofía (Manuela Viale) She is the new maid of the Bandi family, and she must do the tasks that Rosa and Carmen previously did.
- Alicia (Viviana Puerta) She is Ernesto's sister and Nano's biological aunt. She blackmails Gabriela with telling the truth if Gabriela doesn't give her money.
- Analía (María Zamarbide) She is the owner of the record label that hires Lucas, and becomes Lucas's lover.
- Tony (Juan Ignacio Machado) He is Paula's ex-boyfriend, he mistreats her since he wants to go back to her anyway.
- Araceli González as Tatiana González
- María Del Cerro as Melina
- Coki Ramírez as Cati
- Germán Paoloski as Juanjo
- Silvia Kalfaian as Bernardina
- Lola Bezerra as Paola
- Eunice Castro as Mariana
- Gabriela Cóceres as Sabrina
- Emiliano Estevanez as Adrián
- Nilda Raggi as Sofía
- Edgardo Moreira as Atilio
- Luciana Lifschitz as Griselda
- Mirta Wons as Irina
- Marcela Ferradás as Irma
- Gabo Correa as Camilo
- María José Gabín as Concepción
- Bruno Alcón as Dante
- Gabriela Groppa as Sandra
- Fernando Sayano as Román
- Julieta Bartolomé as Luci
- Álvaro Armand Ugón as Ramírez
- Diego Ferrari as Gutíerrez

=== Cameos ===
- Mariana Espósito as Ana
- Juan Pedro Lanzani as Fede
- Gastón Dalmau as Pablo
- Sergio Dalma
- Alejandro Wiebe
- Agustín Canapino
- Christian Ledesma
- Clara Kauff as Clara
- Gabriel Corrado
- Thian
- Laura Ubfal
- Jorge Cali
- Jorge Ibáñez

== Reception ==
According to IBOPE Group, in its debut averaging 13.3 rating points (peaking at 17), the third most watched program of the day. With the passing of the days his audience grew, maintaining an average of 19.8 (being almost always as the third most watched program of the day).

== Awards ==
=== Nominations ===
- 2013 Martín Fierro Awards
  - Best daily fiction
  - Best actor of daily drama (Juan Darthés)
  - Best actress of daily drama (Carina Zampini)

== Versions ==
- (Colombia) Dulce amor - a Colombian remake produced by Caracol TV in 2013 or 2014. Starring Andrés Sandoval and Marianela González.
- (Mexico) Hasta el fin del mundo - a Mexican remake produced by Televisa aired in 2014. Starring Pedro Fernández and Marjorie de Sousa
- (Chile) El amor lo manejo yo - a Chilean remake produced by TVN will be aired in March 2014. Starring Jorge Zabaleta and María Elena Swett
- Aşk ve İhtiras a Turkey remake by Show TV will be aired on October 19, 2015. However, it was cancelled after its 10th episode due to lack of ratings. The series started airing again on July 11, 2016 from its first episode and continued from Monday to Friday between 06:00-08:00 every day until Show TV acquired the broadcasting rights at the end of August, this time it was taken off air for good.
- La Vie Est Belle a French Remake by France 2 will be aired in 2018 With Cyril Féraud and Indila
- Cinta Koko Coklat a Malaysia Remake by NTV7 will be aired on July 23, 2018. Starring Aqasha and Zahirah Macwilson.

== Music ==
1. Dulce Amor - Puentes
2. Dulce Amor (Acoustic version) - Puentes
3. Spaghetti del Rock - Nicolás Riera
4. Juntos a la par - Rocío Igarzábal
5. Integridad perfecta - Nicolás Riera & Rocío Igarzábal
6. Todo en mi vida eres tú - Juanes
7. Si tú no existieras - Ricardo Arjona
8. Fuiste tú - Ricardo Arjona & Gaby Moreno
9. El Mundo - Sergio Dalma
10. Te amo - Sergio Dalma
11. La de la mala suerte - Jesse & Joy
12. Llorar - Jesse & Joy and Mario Domm
13. Ella vive en mí - Álex Ubago
14. Todo mi mundo - Axel
15. Sin tu amor - Nicolás Zuviría
