= Sueña conmigo =

Nickelodeon telenovela

- Genre: Teen drama Telenovela
- Written by: Claudio Lacelli; Mariana Palos; Gabriela Montijo; Carolina Parmo; Laura Farhi; Willy van Broock
- Starring: Eiza González; Santiago Ramundo; Vanesa Gabriela Leiro; Valentín Villafañe; Brenda Asnicar
- Opening theme: "Sueña conmigo" performed by Sueña Conmigo cast
- Country of origin: Argentina
- Original language: Spanish
- No. of episodes: 150

Production
- Executive producers: Sofía Ioannou; Tatiana Rodríguez
- Production locations: Buenos Aires, Argentina
- Running time: 45 min.
- Production companies: Nickelodeon Latin America; Illusion Studios; Televisa

Original release
- Network: Nickelodeon Latin America
- Release: July 20, 2010 – April 1, 2011

Sueña Conmigo (English: Dream with Me) is a telenovela produced by Nickelodeon Latin America, Illusion Studios and Televisa. It is the sixth Latin American production for Nickelodeon. It premiered on July 23, 2010.

In 2014 it was remade as “Dreams” in France for the NRJ 12 TV channel.

== Production ==
Executive Producers are Sofia Ioannou, CEO of MTV Networks Latin America and Tatiana Rodriguez, Senior Vice President of Programming and Creative Strategy at Nickelodeon Latin America. The Televisa production area with Roberto Gómez Fernández in the lead, will actively participate in the creative process, to provide expertise on gender children and adolescents.

== Synopsis ==
The story recounts the love between Clara Molina and Luca Rassi; they are two teenagers who are willing to do anything to fulfill their dreams. Clara loves to sing, so she decides to join Soy Tu Super Star, a reality show where the winner will become famous. But Clara's father won't let her join the show, so Clara created Roxy Pop. Luca's passion is music, so along with his friends Chediak, Enzo Di Carlo, Slashrr and João Donoso they start a band called Lost Boys. Luca Rassi's girlfriend, Marcia Lima was the lead singer, but she also wanted to participate in the reality show, so she left the band. Titan is a guy who is in love with Clara, but she doesn't like him. He's always trying to do the impossible (and mostly for Luca) and get her to be his girlfriend. Later, Clara learns that her father is dating a woman who has a daughter called Nuria Gomez; she too has fallen for Luca and is willing to do whatever it takes to get him. Will Clara and Luca succeed in their dreams and realize their love for each other? Will Clara reveal Roxy's identity?

== Cast ==
- Eiza González as Clara Molina / Roxy Pop
- Santiago Ramundo as Luca Grossi
- Vanesa Leiro as Marcia Lima
- Valentín Villafañe as Titán
- Brenda Asnicar as Nuria Gomez
- Gabriel Ramos as Gabo
- Micaela Castellotti as Herself
- Gastón Soffritti as Iván Quintero
- Agustina Quinci as Violeta / Mimi
- Brian Vainberg as Mauro
- Federico Baron as Rafael Molina
- Delfina Peña as Samanta

== Music ==
The soundtrack of the series was released only in Mexico & Argentina as of November 29, 2010. The album includes 12 songs. Later it was released in Brazil.

- 1."Sueña conmigo" - Elenco de Sueña Conmigo
- 2."Soy tu super star" - Eiza González
- 3."Cuando yo te vi" - Eiza González and Santiago Ramundo
- 4."Hablan de mí" - Brenda Asnicar
- 5."El circo de la vida" - Santiago Ramundo
- 6."Dime que sí, dime que no" - Eiza González
- 7."Como perro y gato" - Eiza González
- 8."Siempre te esperaré" - Brenda Asnicar
- 9."El tren" - Santiago Ramundo
- 10."Contigo todo" - Eiza González and Santiago Ramundo
- 11."Igual que yo" - Vanesa Gabriela Leiro
- 12."El ritmo de mi gente" - Eiza González and Santiago Ramundo

A volume two was released exclusively in Argentina on March 15, 2011, including a DVD with music videos. This volume wa named "Sigue Soñando" (Keep Dreaming). In Brazil only the DVD was released.

1. Hagas lo que hagas - 3.34 - Brenda Asnicar
2. Dejame entrar - 3.46 - Eiza González
3. Mundo imperfecto - 3.23 - Eiza González
4. Chicas buenas - 3.19 - Eiza González
5. Como decirte que te quiero - 3.27 - Eiza González
6. Razones - 3.48 - Eiza González
7. Si pudiera - 3.10 - Vanesa Gabriela Leiro
8. Y Ahora - 3.47 - Eiza González
9. Yo Lo Vi Primero - 2.57 - Vanesa Gabriela Leiro & Eiza González
10. Es El Click - 3.05 - Eiza González
11. Amor Mío - 2.53 - Eiza González
12. Nada Que No Sepas - 3.35 - Vanesa Gabriela Leiro
13. Que me amas - 3.28 - Eiza González
14. Tu color - 3.45 - Eiza González

== Awards ==
Year	Award	Category	Nominated	Result
2011	Kids' Choice Awards Mexico			
2011	Kids' Choice Awards Mexico	Favorite Female Character in a Series	Eiza González	Nominated
2011	Kids' Choice Awards Mexico	Favorite Male Character in a Series	Santiago Ramundo	Nominated
2011	Kids' Choice Awards Mexico	Favorite Villain	Brenda Asnicar	Nominated
2011	Kids' Choice Awards Mexico	Favorite TV Program	Distribution of Sueña Conmigo	Nominated
2011	Kids' Choice Awards Argentina			
2011	Kids' Choice Awards Argentina	Best Actress	Eiza González	Nominated
2011	Kids' Choice Awards Argentina	Best Actress	Brenda Asnicar	Nominated
2011	Kids' Choice Awards Argentina	Favorite Villain	Vanesa Gabriela Leiro	Nominated
2011	Kids' Choice Awards Argentina	Favorite Latin TV Program	Distribution of Sueña Conmigo	Won
2011	Kids' Choice Awards Argentina	Best Actor	Santiago Ramundo	Won
2011	Kids' Choice Awards Argentina	Breakout Artist	Eiza González	Won
2011	Meus Premios Nick			
2011	Meus Premios Nick	Best Actress	Eiza González	Nominated
2011	Meus Premios Nick	Year galan	Santiago Ramundo	Nominated
2011	Meus Premios Nick	Hair Maluco	Eiza González, Roxy Pop	Nominated

== See also ==
- Nickelodeon Latin America
