= Santiago Ramundo =

Argentine television actor, model and singer

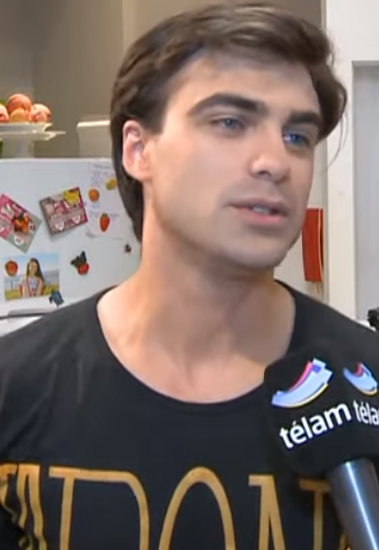
- Ramundo in 2013
- Born: Santiago Ramundo; 10 May 1984 (age 41); Villa del Parque, Buenos Aires, Argentina
- Occupations: television actor, model, singer and lawyer
- Years active: 2005–present
- Partner: Sofía Pachano
- Children: 1
- Website: www.santirdz.com

Santiago Ramundo (born 10 May 1984) is an Argentine television actor, model and singer, also he graduated as a lawyer. He is best known for starring in telenovelas such as Sueña conmigo, Dulce amor and Sangre de mi tierra.

== Early life and education ==
He was born to parents, Blanca y José Ramundo, and is the eldest of three children. From the age of 4-17, he attended Instituto Santa Rita, a Catholic school in Villa del Parque in Buenos Aires.

He was interested in music and art as a child and studied piano and musical comedy. He studied law at the University of Buenos Aires for 8 years to become a lawyer.

== Career ==
He began his acting career in theatre productions on Buenos Aires. In 2006, he was cast in the Russian-Argentine, telenovela Tango del último amor, produced by TV Channel Russia and Telefe International, in the role of Esteban. He relocated to Moscow in Russia to film the series.

In 2007 he played Ramiro Vázquez, a villain in the telenovela Son de Fierro. In the same year he had a role in the series Mujeres de nadie, playing Claudio Mendizabal, and also acted on stage in the play El caballero enduendado.

In 2017-2018, he starred as Roberto Quiroga in the Telemundo telenovela, Sangre de mi tierra, which was filmed in Miami.

== Personal life ==
Ramundo lives with his partner, Sofía Pachano, an actress and daughter of Aníbal Pachano. The couple have one son, born in 2026. They live in Buenos Aires.

In 2012, he revealed that he had converted from Catholicism to Buddhism. His process began in 2007, while filming a TV series.

== Filmography ==
Television
Year	Title	Role
2005	Floricienta	Cameo
2006	Tango del último amor	Esteban
2007	Son de Fierro	Ramiro Vázquez
2007	Mujeres de nadie	Claudio Mendizabal
2007	Valentino, el argentino	Marcelo
2008	La maga y el camino dorado	Martín
2008–2009	Atracción x4	Benicio
2009	Champs 12	Marcos Del Campo
2009	Enséñame a vivir	Diego
2010–2011	Sueña conmigo	Luca Grossi
2012–2013	Dulce amor	Ciro Montero / Ciro Montalbán
2013–2014	Señales	Damián
2015	Entre caníbales	Matías Lemos Arenal
2016	Sueño de amor	Luca de la Colina Conde
2017–2018	Sangre de mi tierra	Roberto Quiroga
2020	Decisiones: Unos ganan, otros pierden	Santiago Aguilar
2020	M.D.: Life on the Line	Diego
2020	Adentro	Augusto
2020-2021	40 y 20	David
2023-2024	Buenos Chicos	Juan Pablo Trevisan
