= Nicolás Riera =

Argentine actor

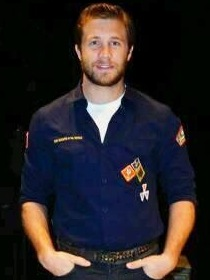
- Riera in 2014
- Born: Nicolás Adolfo Guggiana Riera; May 29, 1985 (age 40); San Fernando, Buenos Aires Province, Argentina
- Other names: Nicolás Riera; Tacho Riera; Nico Riera
- Occupation: Actor
- Years active: 2002-present
- Height: 1.74 m (5 ft 8 1/2 in)
- Partner(s): Thelma Fardín (2023–present); Giulia Gabetta (2012/13-2013/14); Rocío Igarzábal (2012); Silvina Escudero (2011–2012); María Eugenia Suárez (2007–2010)
- Parent(s): Osvaldo Guggiana (father); María Laura Riera (mother)
- Relatives: Mariano Riera (brother); Jazmín Riera (younger sister)
- Website: nicolasriera.com

Nicolás Adolfo Guggiana Riera (born May 29, 1985) is an Argentine actor.

== Biography ==
Nicolás Riera is the son of Osvaldo Guggiana and María Laura Riera and has two siblings, Mariano and Jazmín, who is a writer. He completed his primary and secondary studies at Colegio Marín, in San Isidro, Buenos Aires Province, Argentina. In his youth he played rugby in the San Fernando club team, he is also a lover of surfing and skiing. Nicolás Riera practices Jiu Jitsu, a sport that combines mixed martial arts. He practices amateur football frequently. He is a fan of the UFC.

== Personal life ==
Nicolás Riera is very close with his Casi Ángeles co–stars Mariana Espósito, Gastón Dalmau, Juan Pedro Lanzani, Rocío Igarzábal and María Eugenia Suárez. During the recordings of Casi Ángeles Nicolás Riera was in a relationship with his co–star María Eugenia Suárez.

From 2011 to 2012, Nicolás Riera was in a relationship with Silvina Escudero.

From 2012 to 2014, Nicolás Riera was in a relationship with his co–star Rocío Igarzábal.

From June 2019 to 2021, Nicolás Riera was in a relationship with the actress Giulia Gabetta.

== Career ==
Nicolás Riera participated in the 2002 series Kachorra. In 2006 Nicolás Riera participated in the children's and youth novel Alma Pirata. In 2006 Nicolás Riera participated in the sit-com Casados con Hijos. At the end of 2006 he was selected to play the character of Juan "Tacho" Morales in the television series Casi Ángeles. Nicolás Riera participated in the theatrical adaptations of the series and those of the band Teen Angels. In January 2012 to 2013 he played the character of Lucas Pedroso on the television series Dulce Amor. In 2013 and 2014 Nicolás Riera also starred in the docu-reality Viajar es mi destino in Panama and Ecuador. From the end of 2013 to 2014 Together with Catherine Fulop, Rocío Igarzábal and Gabriel Corrado he starred in the television series Taxxi, amores cruzados broadcast by Telefe. In cinema Nicolás Riera starred with Rocío Igarzábal and Gastón Soffritti the film El desafío. This film was shot during 2014, and premiered on January 29, 2015. In 2016 Nicolás Riera joined the cast of the Pol-ka television series, Los ricos no piden permiso. In 2017 he starred in the series Cartoneros, where he plays El Dandyr. In the series he is accompanied by Luis Luque, Jenny Williams, Micaela Vázquez and Silvia Kutica. In 2017 he joined the cast of the Pol-ka television series, Las Estrellas (telenovela) broadcast by Canal 13 with Marcela Kloosterboer, Violeta Urtizberea, Celeste Cid, Gonzalo Valenzuela, Luciano Castro, Nicolás Francella, Natalie Pérez and Justina Bustos. The series premiered on May 29, 2017, and ended on January 23, 2018. In 2018 he was part of the main cast of the series Millennials broadcast by Net TV with Noelia Marzol, Laura Laprida, Matías Mayer, Juan Manuel Guilera and Johanna Francella.

== Filmography ==
=== Television ===
Year	Title	Character	Channel
2002	Kachorra	Franco	Telefe
2003	Rincón de Luz	Friend of Lucas	América TV
2005	El Patrón de la Vereda	Student	América TV
2005-2006	Casados con Hijos	Delivery Boy	Telefe
2006	Alma Pirata	Gabriel	Telefe
2006	Chiquititas Sin Fin	Model	Telefe
2007-2010	Casi Ángeles	Juan "Tacho" Morales	Telefe
2012-2013	Dulce Amor	Lucas Pedroso González	Telefe
2013-2014	Taxxi, amores cruzados	Diego Montana	Telefe
2015	Pan y vino	Thief	América TV
2016	Los ricos no piden permiso	Juan Domingo Juárez	Canal 13
2017	Cartoneros	El Dandy	Canal 9
2017-2018	Las Estrellas	Leonardo Loma	Canal 13
2018-2019	Millennials	Benjamín Céspedes	Net TV
2021	Millennials	Benjamín Céspedes	Netflix
2022	The First of Us	Cristian García	Telefe

=== Theater ===
Year	Title	Character
2007-2010	Casi Ángeles	Juan "Tacho" Morales
2007-2012	Teen Angels	Himself
2016	Casa Valentina	Lucas/Miranda

=== Television Programs ===
Year	Program	Channel	Notes
2011	Bailando 2011	Canal 13	Participant
2013-2015	Viajar es mi destino	Canal 9	Host

=== Movies ===
Year	Movie	Character	Director
2013	Teen Angels: El Adiós	Himself	Juan Manuel Jiménez
2015	El desafío	Juan	Juan Manuel Rampoldi
2019	La Grieta	Nacho	Pedro Maccarone and Max Franco
2019	Te pido un taxi	Rodrigo Muñoz	Martin Armoya

== Awards and nominations ==
Year	Award	Category	Work	Result
2011	Nickelodeon Kids' Choice Awards Argentina	Favorite Actor	Casi Ángeles	Nominated
2017	Estrella de Mar Awards	Male Cast Performance	Casa Valentina	Nominated
2017	Notirey Awards	Supporting Actor	Las Estrellas (telenovela)	Nominated
