= Despedida de Solteros =

Argentine reality television series

- Genre: Reality competition
- Starring: Marley; Carina Zampini
- Opening theme: "Bombón" by Bandana feat. Wisin
- Country of origin: Argentina
- Original language: Spanish
- No. of seasons: 1
- No. of episodes: 65

Production
- Production locations: Palermo Hollywood, Buenos Aires
- Running time: 120 minutes (Galas); 60 minutes (Diarios)
- Production company: Endemol

Original release
- Network: Telefe
- Release: January 22 – April 23, 2017

Related
- Gran Hermano Argentina

Despedida de Solteros (English: Bachelor Party) is a reality show produced and broadcast by the Argentinian television network Telefe. The show was hosted by Marley and Carina Zampini. It was first aired on January 22, 2017.

== Format and rules ==
Twelve couples with a main goal of getting married are divided into two different houses: a "loft in the sky" and a "PH in the ground". In there, they are isolated from their partners and the outside world in order to live with strangers. Each week they nominate each other, and contestants with most points face the audience's eviction.

The winning couple win a big wedding party, a honeymoon trip and a house as prizes.

== Hosts and segments ==
- Despedida de Solteros: Main Show hosted by Carina Zampini and Marley every Sunday
- Despedida de Solteros: Daily hosted by Carina Zampini and Marley, featuring the "Specialists" (Ivana Nadal, Fabián Medina Flores, Connie Ansaldi, Bernardo Stamateas and Gabriel Cartañá) and eliminated contestants, Monday to Tuesday
- Despedida de Solteros: After Hours hosted by Miki Lusardi, Sunday to Tuesday. Broadcast by MTV.

== Contestants ==
Name	Age	Place of origin	Outcome	Previous outcome	Sent.	Stay
Facundo Rodríguez actor	30	Montevideo, Uruguay	Winners		3	92 days
Paula Silva actress	29	Montevideo, Uruguay	Winners		3	92 days
Alan Franzosi; Bodyguard	23	Lomas de Zamora, Buenos Aires	Runners-up		3	92 days
Karen Condriatiuk; Merchant	20	Banfield, Buenos Aires	Runners-up		3	92 days
Ángeles Escasany; Promoter	28	Pilar, Buenos Aires	3rd Place		5	92 days
Pablo Sánchez; Real estate agent	28	Ramos Mejía, Buenos Aires	3rd Place		5	92 days
Jennifer Reina; Merchant	23	Capital Federal, Buenos Aires	4th Place		3	92 days
Lucas Leonardi; Merchant	26	Capital Federal, Buenos Aires	4th Place		3	92 days
Antonella Nigro; Artistic gymnastics teacher	24	El Palomar, Buenos Aires	7th Evicted		3	88 days
Luciano Magista; Actor / Model / Ex soccer player	25	Lomas del Mirador, Buenos Aires	7th Evicted		3	88 days
Damián Bravo; Singer	27	La Tablada, Buenos Aires	6th Evicted	3rd Evicted	5	42 / 42 days
Karen Castelli; Dancer	28	Villa Tesei, Buenos Aires	6th Evicted	3rd Evicted	5	42 / 42 days
Agostina de la Fuente; Student	20	Capital Federal, Buenos Aires	5th Evicted		2	47 days
Gonzalo Lemos; Unemployed	26	Haedo, Buenos Aires	5th Evicted		2	47 days
Marcos Serris; Telephony seller	23	Olavarría, Buenos Aires	4th Evicted		2	56 days
Victoria Suárez; Student	21	Olavarría, Buenos Aires	4th Evicted		2	56 days
Agustín Vega actor	21	Capital Federal, Buenos Aires	2nd Ejected		2	56 days
Kiara Acosta; YouTuber	18	Capital Federal, Buenos Aires	2nd Ejected		2	56 days
Jonatan Sancho; Circus artist	28	Monte Grande, Buenos Aires	2nd Evicted		1	28 days
Verónica Latrónico; Circus artist	24	Monte Grande, Buenos Aires	2nd Evicted		1	28 days
Leonel Gabarell; Physician / DJ	28	San Carlos de Bariloche, Río Negro	Walked		1	22 days
Sofía Biga; Housewife	26	San Carlos de Bariloche, Río Negro	Walked		1	22 days
Matías Attem; Showbiz journalist	39	Tres Arroyos, Buenos Aires	1st Ejected		1	15 days (+2 days)
Yanina Pasarello; Administrative employee	28	Monte Grande, Buenos Aires	1st Ejected		1	15 days (+2 days)
David Kasner; Councilor	27	Villa María, Córdoba	1st Evicted		1	14 days
Romanela Pucci; Employee	27	Villa María, Córdoba	1st Evicted		1	14 days

Contestant lives in the Loft in the Sky.

Contestant lives in the PH in the Ground.

== General results ==
Couple	Week																			
Couple	1	2	3		4		5	6	7			8	9	10		11	12		13	14
Facundo; Paula	IN	SAFE			SENT		SAVE	SENT	SAVE			SAFE		SAFE			SE	SA		1st
Alan; Karen Co.	IN	SAFE			SENT		SAVE	SAFE				SENT	SAVE	SAFE			SENT		SAVE	2nd
Ángeles; Pablo	IN	SENT	SAVE		SENT		SAVE	SENT	SAVE			SENT	SAVE	SAFE			SE	SA		3rd
Jennifer; Lucas	IN	SAFE			SE	SA		SAFE				SAFE		SE	SA		SENT		SAVE	4th
Antonella; Luciano	IN	SAFE			SE	SA		SAFE				SAFE		SENT		SAVE	SENT		SAVE	EVIC
Damián; Karen Ca.	IN	SAFE			SE	SA		SENT	E	R	IN	SENT	SAVE	SENT		SAVE	SENT		EVIC	
Agostina; Gonzalo					IN			SAFE				SENT	SAVE	SENT		EVIC				
Marcos; Victoria	IN	SAFE			SE	SA		SAFE				SENT	EVIC							
Agustín; Kiara	IN	SAFE			SENT		SAVE	SAFE				SENT	EJEC							
Jonatan; Verónica	IN	SAFE			SENT		EVIC		R											
Leonel; Sofía	IN	SAFE			SE	WA														
Matías; Yanina	IN	SENT	SA	EJ					REP											
David; Romanela	IN	SENT	EVIC																	

- Couple enters or returns to the competition.
- Couple is safe because it didn't receive enough votes in "The Sentence".
- Couple is sentenced by participants voting.
- Couple is sentenced for breaking the rules.
- Couple is exempt from eviction that week.
- Couple is saved from eviction by Specialists' decision.
- Couple is saved from eviction by audience vote.
- Couple competes in a repechage by audience vote.
- Couple leaves the competition by voluntary decision.
- Couple is ejected for breaking the rules.
- Couple is evicted by audience vote.

== Wildcards ==
=== Crystal room ===
The crystal room is a room divided by glass where contestants can make an appointment with their partners, but they can only communicate by telephone and without physical contact. It can be used once by participants through the whole game.

Week	Requested by	Cited contestant
1	Matías	Yanina
1	Agustín	Kiara
1	Leonel	Sofía
2	David	Romanela
2	Karen Co.	Alan
4	Suspended by collective sanction	
5	Antonella	Luciano
8	Paula	Facundo
8	Alan	Karen Co.
10	Luciano	Antonella

=== Spy room ===
The spy room isf a room where each participant can see images or videos from their partners and the other house. It is used several times a week on the producer's decision and criterion.

=== Tree house ===
The tree house is a space between the PH and the Loft. Each couple can request it once in the whole game. It lasts a few hours in which they can communicate and have physical contact with each other, as long they don't talk about the Sentence and votes.

Week	Requested by	Cited contestant
1	Yanina	Matías
2	Agustín	Kiara
3	Marcos	Victoria
3	Pablo	Ángeles
4	Suspended by collective sanction	
6	Facundo	Paula
6	Both houses common agreement	Agustín & Kiara
8	Lucas	Jennifer
8	Alan	Karen Co.
10	Luciano	Antonella
10	Damián	Karen Ca.

=== Switch ===
The "Switch" is an instance which allows the couples to exchange houses for 24 hours. It can be used once per couple in the whole game.

Week	Requested by	Switched with
2	Karen Co.	Alan
3	Leonel	Sofía
3	Facundo	Paula
4	Suspended by collective sanction	
5	Lucas	Jennifer
6	Kiara	Agustín
7	Damián	Karen Ca.
10	Ángeles	Pablo
10	Agostina	Gonzalo

== Nominations table ==
Contestant	Weeks							Result
Contestant	Week 2	Week 4	Week 6	Week 8	Week 10	Semi-final	Final	Result
Facundo	David	Ángeles	Ángeles	Karen Ca.	Ángeles	Karen Ca.	No nominations	Winners (92 Days)
Paula	Yanina	Pablo	Damián	Damián	Agostina	Pablo	No nominations	Winners (92 Days)
Alan	Pablo	Agustín	Pablo	Pablo	Antonella	Pablo	No nominations	Runners-up (92 Days)
Karen Co.	Matías	Kiara	Ángeles	Ángeles	Karen Ca.	Karen Ca.	No nominations	Runners-up (92 Days)
Ángeles	Romanela	Facundo	Facundo	Marcos	Antonella	Lucas	No nominations	3rd Place (92 Days)
Pablo	David	Paula	Paula	Marcos	Jennifer	Jennifer	No nominations	3rd Place (92 Days)
Jennifer	Yanina	Pablo	Damián	Damián	Agostina	Damián	No nominations	4th place (92 Days)
Lucas	David	Ángeles	Gonzalo	Paula	Gonzalo	Ángeles	No nominations	4th place (92 Days)
Antonella	Matías	Kiara	Paula	Ángeles	Karen Ca.	Ángeles	No nominations	7th Evicted (88 Days)
Luciano	Pablo	Agustín	Pablo	Damián	Agostina	Damián	No nominations	7th Evicted (88 Days)
Damián	David	Kiara	Paula	Victoria	Jennifer	Jennifer	6th Evicted (80 Days)	
Karen Ca.	Yanina	Agustín	Facundo	Marcos	Agostina	Lucas	6th Evicted (80 Days)	
Agostina	Not in House		Paula	Jennifer	Jennifer	5th Evicted (47 Days)		
Gonzalo	Not in House		Facundo	Marcos	Lucas	5th Evicted (47 Days)		
Marcos	Matías	Ángeles	Ángeles	Ángeles	4th Evicted (56 Days)			
Victoria	Yanina	Pablo	Damián	Damián	4th Evicted (56 Days)			
Agustín	David	Ángeles	Gonzalo	Karen Ca.	2nd Ejected (56 Days)			
Kiara	Yanina	Pablo	Damián	Damián	2nd Ejected (56 Days)			
Jonatan	Pablo	Agustín	2nd Evicted (28 Days)					
Verónica	David	Kiara	2nd Evicted (28 Days)					
Leonel	Pablo	Agustín	1st Walked (22 Days)					
Sofía	Matías	Ángeles	1st Walked (22 Days)					
Matías	Verónica	1st Ejected (15 Days)						
Yanina	Jonatan	1st Ejected (15 Days)						
David	Pablo	1st Evicted (14 Days)						
Romanela	Jonatan	1st Evicted (14 Days)						
Sentenced	Matías & Yanina (9 votes); David & Romanela (7 votes); Ángeles & Pablo (5 votes)	Agustín & Kiara; Ángeles & Pablo (9 votes); Facundo & Paula (2 votes); Alan & Karen Co. Antonella & Luciano; Damián & Karen Ca. Facundo & Paula; Jennifer & Lucas; Jonatan & Verónica; Marcos & Victoria; Leonel & Sofía (0 votes)	Facundo & Paula (7 votes); Ángeles & Pablo (5 votes); Damián & Karen Ca. (4 votes)	Damián & Karen Ca. (7 votes); Marcos & Victoria (6 votes); Ángeles & Pablo (4 votes); Agostina & Gonzalo; Agustín & Kiara; Alan & Karen (Sanctioned)	Agostina & Gonzalo (5 votes); Jennifer & Lucas (4 votes); Antonella & Luciano; Damián & Karen Ca. (2 votes)	Ángeles & Pablo; Damián & Karen Ca. Jennifer & Lucas (4 votes); Paula & Facundo (0 votes); Antonella & Luciano; Alan & Karen Co. (Sanctioned)	Ángeles & Pablo; Alan & Karen Co. Jennifer & Lucas; Paula & Facundo; Antonella & Luciano	
Saved by the Specialists	Ángeles & Pablo	Damián & Karen Ca. Antonella & Luciano; Marcos & Victoria; Jennifer & Lucas; Alan & Karen Co. Facundo & Paula; Agustín & Kiara	Facundo & Paula	Ángeles & Pablo; Damián & Karen Ca. Agostina & Gonzalo	none			
Saved by the Audience	Matías & Yanina (55.05%)	Ángeles & Pablo (54.08%)	Ángeles & Pablo (59.18%)	Alan & Karen Co. (56.5%)	Jennifer & Lucas (35.52% amongst 4); Antonella & Luciano (47.99% amongst 3); Damián & Karen Ca. (63.19% amongst 2)	Facundo & Paula (25.02% amongst 6); Ángeles & Pablo ( 26.48% amongst 5); Alan & Karen Co. (33.08% amongst 4); Antonella & Luciano ( 41.54% amongst 3); Jennifer & Lucas ( 72.29% amongst 2)	Paula & Facundo (68.76%)	
Evicted	David & Romanela (44.95%)	Jonatan & Verónica (45.92%)	Damián & Karen Ca. (40.82%)	Marcos & Victoria (43.5%)	Agostina & Gonzalo (36.81%)	Damián & Karen Ca. (27.71%)	Alan & Karen Co. (31.24% amongst 2)	
Evicted	David & Romanela (44.95%)	Jonatan & Verónica (45.92%)	Damián & Karen Ca. (40.82%)	Marcos & Victoria (43.5%)	Agostina & Gonzalo (36.81%)	Damián & Karen Ca. (27.71%)	Ángeles & Pablo (19.44% amongst 3)	
Evicted	David & Romanela (44.95%)	Jonatan & Verónica (45.92%)	Damián & Karen Ca. (40.82%)	Marcos & Victoria (43.5%)	Agostina & Gonzalo (36.81%)	Damián & Karen Ca. (27.71%)	Jennifer & Lucas (11.51% amongst 4)	
Evicted	David & Romanela (44.95%)	Jonatan & Verónica (45.92%)	Damián & Karen Ca. (40.82%)	Marcos & Victoria (43.5%)	Agostina & Gonzalo (36.81%)	Damián & Karen Ca. (27.71%)	Antonella & Luciano (6.04% amongst 5)	
Dropouts	none	Matias & Yanina	none	Agustin & Kiara	none			
Driven out	none	Leonel & Sofia	none					

== Ratings ==
Departures & ratings
Week	Episode	Day	Date	Instance	Slot time	Rating	Ranking	Source
1	1	Sunday	January 22	1st Main Show: Presentation	22:00 – 00:00	11.7	#1	
1	2	Monday	January 23	1st Daily	23:00 – 00:00	10.6	#4	
1	3	Tuesday	January 24	2nd Daily	23:00 – 00:00	9.1	#6	
1	4	Wednesday	January 25	3rd Daily	23:00 – 00:00	10.3	#4	
1	5	Thursday	January 26	4th Daily	23:00 – 00:00	10.3	#4	
2	6	Sunday	January 29	2nd Main Show: 1st Sentence	22:00 – 00:00	8.7	#2	
2	7	Monday	January 30	5th Daily	23:00 – 00:00	8.7	#6	
2	8	Tuesday	January 31	6th Daily	23:00 – 00:00	9.5	#6	
2	9	Wednesday	February 1	7th Daily	23:00 – 00:00	8.5	#9	
2	10	Thursday	February 2	8th Daily	23:00 – 00:00	10.3	#5	
3	11	Sunday	February 5	3rd Main Show: David & Romanela Eviction	22:00 – 00:00	10.9	#2	
3	12	Monday	February 6	9th Daily: Matías & Yanina Ejection	23:00 – 00:00	12.1	#4	
3	13	Tuesday	February 7	10th Daily	23:00 – 00:00	11.2	#3	
3	14	Wednesday	February 8	11th Daily	23:00 – 00:00	10.6	#4	
3	15	Thursday	February 9	12th Daily	23:00 – 00:00	8.9	#5	
4	16	Sunday	February 12	4th Main Show: 2nd Sentence	22:00 – 00:00	9.0	#4	
4	17	Monday	February 13	13th Daily: Leonel & Sofía Walked	23:15 – 00:15	10.0	#6	
4	18	Tuesday	February 14	14th Daily: Agostina & Gonzalo Entrance	23:15 – 00:15	8.9	#6	
4	19	Wednesday	February 15	15th Daily	23:15 – 00:15	10.0	#3	
4	20	Thursday	February 16	16th Daily	23:15 – 00:15	8.0	#8	
5	21	Sunday	February 19	5th Main Show: Jonatan & Verónica Eviction	22:00 – 00:00	9.0	#1	
5	22	Monday	February 20	17th Daily	23:15 – 00:15	7.9	#8	
5	23	Tuesday	February 21	18th Daily	23:15 – 00:15	8.2	#8	
5	24	Wednesday	February 22	19th Daily	23:15 – 00:15	8.2	#8	
5	25	Thursday	February 23	20th Daily	23:15 – 00:15	7.9	#9	
6	26	Sunday	February 26	6th Main Show: 3rd Sentence	22:00 – 00:00	5.7	#2	
6	27	Monday	February 27	21st Daily	23:15 – 00:15	6.9	#8	
6	28	Tuesday	February 28	22nd Daily	23:15 – 00:15	7.5	#8	
6	29	Wednesday	March 1	23rd Daily	23:15 – 00:15	8.0	#8	
6	30	Thursday	March 2	24th Daily	23:15 – 00:15	7.8	#8	
7	31	Sunday	March 5	7th Main Show: Damián & Karen Eviction	22:00 – 00:00	7.8	#4	
7	32	Monday	March 6	25th Daily	23:30 – 00:30	7.9	#7	
7	33	Tuesday	March 7	26th Daily: Damián & Karen, Matías & Yanina Repechage	23:30 – 00:30	9.4	#7	
7	34	Wednesday	March 8	27th Daily	23:30 – 00:30	7.6	#10	
7	35	Thursday	March 9	28th Daily: Damián & Karen Returns	23:30 – 00:30	9.6	#6	
8	36	Sunday	March 12	8th Main Show: 4th Sentence	22:00 – 00:00	8.3	#4	
8	37	Monday	March 13	29th Daily	23:30 – 00:30	8.3	#8	
8	38	Tuesday	March 14	30th Daily	23:30 – 00:30	7.2	#12	
8	39	Wednesday	March 15	31st Daily	23:30 – 00:30	8.4	#10	
8	40	Thursday	March 16	32nd Daily	23:30 – 00:30	8.0	#9	
9	41	Sunday	March 19	9th Main Show: Agustín & Kiara Ejection; Marcos & Victoria Eviction	22:30 – 00:00	8.3	#5	
9	42	Monday	March 20	33rd Daily	23:30 – 00:30	8.0	#7	
9	43	Wednesday	March 22	34th Daily	23:30 – 00:30	7.4	#10	
9	44	Thursday	March 23	35th Daily	23:30 – 00:30	7.9	#5	
10	45	Sunday	March 26	10th Main Show: 5th Sentence	22:30 – 00:00	8.1	#5	
10	46	Monday	March 27	36th Daily	23:30 – 00:30	8.4	#8	
10	47	Tuesday	March 28	37th Daily	23:30 – 00:30	8.1	#10	
10	48	Wednesday	March 29	38th Daily	23:30 – 00:30	7.6	#11	
10	49	Thursday	March 30	39th Daily	23:30 – 00:30	8.5	#8	
11	50	Sunday	April 2	11th Main Show: Agostina & Gonzalo Eviction	22:30 – 00:00	8.8	#5	
11	51	Monday	April 3	40th Daily	23:30 – 00:30	8.6	#8	
11	52	Tuesday	April 4	41st Daily	23:30 – 00:30	7.7	#9	
11	53	Wednesday	April 5	42nd Daily	23:30 – 00:30	7.6	#8	
11	54	Thursday	April 6	43rd Daily	23:30 – 00:30	7.9	#9	
12	55	Sunday	April 9	12th Main Show: 6th Sentence	22:30 – 00:00	8.8	#7	
12	56	Monday	April 10	44th Daily	23:30 – 00:30	6.9	#12	
12	57	Tuesday	April 11	45th Daily	23:30 – 00:30	7.2	#10	
12	58	Wednesday	April 12	46th Daily	23:30 – 00:30	7.6	#8	
12	59	Thursday	April 13	47th Daily	23:30 – 00:30	7.6	#7	
13	60	Sunday	April 16	13th Main Show: Karen & Damian Re-Eviction	22:30 – 00:00	7.2	#7	
13	61	Monday	April 17	48th Daily	23:30 – 00:30	7.5	#8	
13	62	Tuesday	April 18	49th Daily	23:30 – 00:30	7.3	#8	
13	63	Wednesday	April 19	50th Daily	23:30 – 00:30	7.9	#9	
13	64	Thursday	April 20	51st Daily: Antonella & Luciano Eviction	23:30 – 00:30	7.9	#10	
14	65	Sunday	April 23	14th Main Show: Final	22:30 – 00:00	10.2	#5	

Most viewed departure.
Least viewed departure.

Rating average: 8.0
