= Millennials (TV series) =

Argentine telenovela

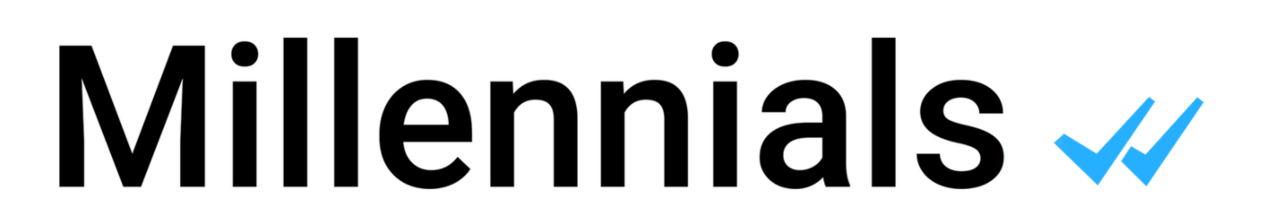
- Genre: Telenovela; Comedy drama Romance
- Created by: Martín Kweller
- Written by: Martín Kweller; Nicolás Marina; Rodo Servino; José Militano
- Directed by: Mauro Scandolari; Augusto Tejada; Pedro Levanti
- Starring: Nicolás Riera; Noelia Marzol; Gastón Soffritti; Laura Laprida; Juan Manuel Guilera; Johanna Francella; Matías Mayer
- Theme music composer: Claudio Ojeda; José A. Messia Rampoldi
- Country of origin: Argentina
- Original language: Spanish
- No. of seasons: 3
- No. of episodes: 63

Production
- Executive producers: Gastón Soffritti; Maru Mosca; Claudio Brusca; Mariano Hueter
- Producers: Guido Kaczka; Martín Kweller
- Production location: Buenos Aires, Argentina
- Cinematography: Nicolás Miranda
- Running time: 40 minutes
- Production companies: Editorial Perfil; Kuarzo Entertainment Argentina

Original release
- Network: Net TV; Netflix
- Release: November 26, 2018 – May 21, 2021

Millennials is an Argentine telenovela of comedy drama and romance. The series tells the story of six young millennials and their lives, their loves, their interests and their conflicts. It stars Nicolás Riera, Noelia Marzol, Gastón Soffritti, Laura Laprida, Juan Manuel Guilera, Johanna Francella and Matías Mayer.

In May 2019, it was announced that the series had been renewed for a second season which had 24 episodes and that they aired on June 24, 2019.

In October 2020, it was confirmed that it was renewed for a third season of 15 episodes, whose premiere was on Netflix on May 21, 2021.

== Plot ==
=== First season ===
The series tells the story of three young adults Benjamín, Rodrigo and JuanMa, who meet in an integrated office and decide to create a food ordering and delivery app specifically for homecooked meals. They are soon accompanied by their girlfriends Ariana, Alma and Florencia who will help them and also develop their own app for notekeeping at university. However, a rivalry develops as some of them begin to flirt with each other's partners.

=== Second season ===
After the unexpected departure of Ariana, who left no information about his whereabouts, Benjamín, three months after what happened redoes his life, establishing a new love relationship with another girl, who will not have the best intentions with him or his circle of friends, whom the new conquest of Benjamín does not end up pleasing. On the other hand, Florencia and Juan Manuel are engaged and are in full organization of their marriage, which will be frustrated by an unexpected revelation that will emotionally affect a member of the couple, while Rodrigo, away from Alma, is working as an employee of his sister, since after his bad administration he lost the company he inherited from his father. However, the group of friends will be surprised by the return of a person who will make their lives change again and will have to adjust to it.

=== Third season ===
A few months after the news of Ariana's pregnancy and Juanma's departure on a journey of self-knowledge around the world. On the one hand, Alma and Rodrigo, have the task of running a home in parallel with raising their baby Valentín, which will change Rodrigo's perception of his partner, since he discovers that he feels desires for another person of the same sex. Meanwhile, Ariana faces a complicated pregnancy, because she does not know who the real father of her child is and must take over her father's company that is on the way to bankruptcy. For his part, Benjamín will have to figure out what to do with his life when an unrecognized son appears to him and of whom he did not know its existence. Instead, Axel will lead coworking through the launch of the Shine Bag platform and his relationship with Florencia will lead him to experience other forms of pleasure beyond voyeurism. Back in Argentina, Juan Manuel decides to hide in Alma and Rodrigo's house, as he escapes from a sex crime that he has apparently committed.

== Cast ==
=== Protagonists ===
- Nicolás Riera as Benjamín Céspedes
- Noelia Marzol as Florencia Argañaraz
- Gastón Soffritti as Axel Forte (guest Season 1 and recurring Season 2; Season 3–present)
- Laura Laprida as Ariana Beltrán
- Juan Manuel Guilera as Juan Manuel "Juanma" Losada
- Johanna Francella as Alma Carrizo
- Matías Mayer as Rodrigo Ruiz

=== Co-protagonists ===
- Osmar Núñez as Mauricio Beltrán
- Chang Sung Kim as Alberto
- Fabio Aste as Octavio Céspedes
- Luisa Drozdek as Gabriela Calderone
- Agustina Mindlin as Julia Ruiz
- Santiago Talledo as Facundo Ventura

=== Participations ===
- Agustín Casanova as Ramiro Salazar
- Felipe Colombo as Leonardo "Leo" Heredia
- Facundo Gambandé as Mirko
- Emanuel García as Lautaro
- Andrés Gil as Mario
- Rodrigo Noya as Fisura
- Pasta Dioguardi as Facundo's father
- Diego Ramos
- Federico Barón as Martín Demarco
- Liliana Popovich as Raquel Gorostiza
- Lucas Velasco as Luca Banegas
- Stefanía Roitman as Natalia Álvarez
- Romina Giardina as Virginia Conte
- Camila Mateos as Ana Forte
- Florencia Ventura as Jimena Montes
- Eugenia Alonso como Mirta
- Nicolás Occhiato as Peter
- Ignacio Sureda as Brian
- Bárbara Vélez as Paula
- Cala Zavaleta as Belén
- Walter Donado as Álvarez
- Gabriel Gallichio as Juan Cruz
- Luli Torn as Lila
- Valentina Frione as Malena
- Sonia Zavaleta as Pilar
- Sabrina Fogolini as Lola
- Francisco Andrade as Pablo
- Adriana Salonia as Vilma
- Gastón Vietto as Gastón
- Jennifer Biancucci as María Paz
- Jey Mammon as Psic. Córdoba
- Miriam Lanzoni as Lic. Antunez
- Ezequiel Cwirkaluk as Pulpo
- Chule Von Wernich as Herself
- Germán Tripel

== Series overview ==
Season	Episodes	Originally released	
Season	Episodes	First released	Last released
1	24	November 26, 2018	June 20, 2019
2	24	June 24, 2019	August 1, 2019
3	15	May 21, 2020	
