= Sangre de mi tierra =

- Genre: Telenovela
- Created by: Valentina Párraga
- Written by: Felipe Espinet; Berenice Cárdenas; Valentina Párraga; María Helena Portas; Marco Tulio Socorro
- Story by: Valentina Párraga; María Helena Portas; Marcos Socorro
- Directed by: Tony Rodríguez; Otto Rodríguez; Ricardo Schwarz
- Creative director: Valerina Viñana
- Starring: Ana Belena; Lambda García; Santiago Ramundo; Antonio de la Vega; Carolina Gómez; Miguel de Miguel; Gloria Peralta; Daniel Elbittar
- Music by: Tulio Cremisini
- Country of origin: United States
- Original language: Spanish
- No. of seasons: 1
- No. of episodes: 59

Production
- Executive producers: Ricardo Coeto; José Gerardo Guillén; Jairo Arcila
- Production locations: Florida, United States; California, United States
- Editor: Hader Antivar
- Camera setup: Multi-camera
- Production company: Telemundo Studios

Original release
- Network: Telemundo
- Release: 29 November 2017 – 20 February 2018

Sangre de mi tierra is an American telenovela that premiered on Telemundo on 29 November 2017, and concluded on 20 February 2018. The telenovela is an original story by Valentina Párraga, and produced by José Gerardo Guillén for Telemundo.

It stars Ana Belena and Lambda García as main characters, along with Santiago Ramundo as main villain, with Miguel de Miguel, Antonio de la Vega, Carolina Gómez, Gloria Peralta, and the special appearance of Daniel Elbittar.

== Plot ==
From left to right, The Montiel Family composed by Juan José (Lambda García), Natalia Martínez de Montiel (Carolina Gómez), Paco Montiel (Miguel de Miguel), and Luis Montiel (Gabriel Rossi).

Crisanto Castañeda (Antonio de la Vega) and Natalia Martínez de Montiel (Carolina Gómez) are people from the land and the vineyards. For them, the grape, its cultivation, the elaboration of the musts and the quality of its wines is not a trade or a way of sustaining itself. It is a passion. A way of life. The only way to breathe and feel. This is the story that we are going to tell. Two intense and complicated families, Los Castañeda and Los Montiel, their encounters, their enmity, their loves, their hatreds and their intolerances, within the framework of the great passion they share: life.

Crisanto Castañeda came to Napa thirty years ago, from his native Michoacán, without a dime. After many years of hard work, he has a faithful wife, Mercedes (Gloria Peralta), four children: Emilio (Daniel Elbittar), Aurora (Ana Belena), Paloma (Josette Vidal) and Leonardo (Héctor Medina); It has its splendid vineyards, but above all, it has its bodega of strong and powerful wines.

Natalia Martínez de Montiel (Carolina Gómez) was born in the great vineyards of Napa, and grew picking grapes next to her parents, Joaquín (Rubén Morales) and Emilia Martínez, humble braceros who fought to give her a better future in this new land and, thanks to them, she was able to achieve a career university. She married Paco Montiel (Miguel de Miguel), an educated and good man, who supported her in her dreams of becoming a winemaker and today is still planted with expansion plans. He had only one son, Luis Montiel (Gabriel Rossi), married to Anita Carmona (Estefany Oliveira), and a winemaker, like his father. In addition, she had to raise the eldest son of her husband, the problematic Juan José Montiel (Lambda García).

Los Castañeda and Los Montiel have a friendship of years. Joaquín Martínez (Rubén Morales) helped Crisanto (Antonio de la Vega) buy his first land, and Crisanto, many years later, lent the money to Los Montiel to open their small cellar. The harmony of the relationship ends with the death of Emilio (Daniel Elbittar), the eldest son of Crisanto, in a car accident caused by the imprudence of his best friend, Juanjo Montiel (Lambda García), the son of Paco (Miguel de Miguel). From that family tragedy, a war between families and wineries is established. Because Crisanto, taken by the pain and the rage for his loss, puts a demand that aggravates the sentence of unintentional homicide of Juan José, Juanjo lasts a year and a half to jail, and terminates his relationship with Aurora (Ana Belena) the daughter of Crisanto. But in the midst of hatred, love underlies: Juanjo's love for Aurora, who is now married with Roberto (Santiago Ramundo). There is also a passionate love between Paco, Natalia's husband, for Paloma (Josette Vidal), the youngest daughter of the Castañeda. This relationship ends up aggravating the continuous fights and traps that are inflicted Natalia and Crisanto. And at the height of this enmity, there is a murder, which will put the two families in check, since many had reasons to commit it. Added to the suspense created by the murder, each of the members in both families will have to fight against their own and particular demons until they are defeated.

== Cast ==
=== Main ===
- Ana Belena as Aurora Castañeda
- Lambda García as Juan José "Juanjo" Montiel
- Santiago Ramundo as Roberto Quiroga
- Antonio de la Vega as Crisanto Castañeda
- Carolina Gómez as Natalia Martínez de Montiel
- Miguel de Miguel as Paco Montiel
- Gloria Peralta as Mercedes Paredes de Castañeda
- Daniel Elbittar as Emilio Castañeda

=== Also main ===
- Laura Chimaras as Serena Zambrano
- Josette Vidal as Paloma Castañeda
- Gabriel Rossi as Luis Montiel
- Dad Dáger as Susan Acosta
- Rubén Morales as Joaquín
- Alba Roversi as Sara
- Francisco Porras as Dimas
- Roberto Plantier as Ernesto Merchan
- Maky Soler as Doris Anderson
- Estefany Oliveira as Ana Barrios de Montiel
- Keller Wortham as Horacio
- Héctor Medina as Leornado
- Gabriel López as Rafael Zambrano
- Federico Díaz as Mike
- Ana Sobero as Dolores Pérez
- Liz Dieppa as Sofía

=== Special participation ===
- Johanna Cure as Kimberly Figueroa
- Carlos Santos as Iván
- Aneudy Lara as Jordan Giménez
- Fernando Pacanins as Dr. Portillo
- César Rodríguez as Wilmer
- Raw Leiba as Dario Guapos

=== Recurring ===
- Tangi Colombel as Smith
- Ezequiel Montalt as Daniel Fajardo

== Production ==
The telenovela is an original by Valentina Párraga, written by María Helena Portas and Marco Tulio Socorro and directed by Tony Rodríguez, Ricardo Schwarz, and Otto Rodríguez, and produced by José Gerardo Guillén.

=== Promotion ===
The first complete advance of the telenovela was launched on Telemundo on November 14, 2017, during the broadcast of the second season of Sin senos sí hay paraíso.

== Reception ==
During the premiere of the telenovela, this had good reception from the audience. According to People en Español, the quality of the image and direction were pleasing to attract the public.

== Ratings ==
Viewership and ratings per season of Sangre de mi tierra
Season	Timeslot (ET)	Episodes	First aired		Last aired		Avg. viewers (millions)	18–49 rank
Season	Timeslot (ET)	Episodes	Date	Viewers (millions)	Date	Viewers (millions)	Avg. viewers (millions)	18–49 rank
1	Mon–Fri 9pm/8c	55 (Note: Should reflect the number of episodes that contribute to the average given in the last column.)	29 November 2017	1.15	20 February 2018	1.46	1.10	TBD

== Episodes ==
No.	Title	Original release date	US viewers (millions)
1	"El accidente de la discordia"	29 November 2017	1.15
2	"La tierra perdida"	30 November 2017	1.10
3	"Chantajeado por amor"	1 December 2017	0.86
4	"La llave secreta"	4 December 2017	1.02
5	"Lección en la cárcel"	5 December 2017	0.99
6	"Despechada"	6 December 2017	1.02
7	"Embarazo inesperado"	7 December 2017	0.99
8	"Celos enfermizos"	8 December 2017	0.89
9	"Cara de ángel, mente de diablo"	11 December 2017	0.97
10	"Harta del marido"	12 December 2017	1.00
11	"El arte de la seducción"	13 December 2017	1.07
12	"La amante de mi enemigo"	14 December 2017	1.10
13	"Ahí viene la plaga"	15 December 2017	0.96
14	"Buscando al culpable"	18 December 2017	0.96
15	"No lo hice, pero lo pensé"	19 December 2017	1.07
16	"Sed de venganza"	20 December 2017	0.98
17	"En peligro de muerte"	21 December 2017	0.93
18	"Los límites de la intriga"	22 December 2017	0.93
19	"Traicionando a la amiga"	25 December 2017	0.68
20	"Fuera de la familia"	26 December 2017	0.91
21	"Inundado de rabia"	27 December 2017	0.97
22	"Cautiva en su propia casa"	28 December 2017	1.12
23	"Entre vinos y verdades"	29 December 2017	1.01
24	"En contra de los hombres"	1 January 2018	0.97
25	"Verades al descubierto"	2 January 2018	0.95
26	"No todo es lo que aparenta"	3 January 2018	1.11
27	"Desvíos de dinero"	4 January 2018	1.08
28	"En nombre de Emilio"	5 January 2018	1.24
29	"¿El héroe del pueblo?"	8 January 2018	1.14
30	"Tú lo mataste"	9 January 2018	1.18
31	"Cómplice de fraude"	10 January 2018	1.12
32	"La disculpa"	11 January 2018	1.22
33	"Ojo por ojo"	12 January 2018	1.04
34	"Tentaciones a flor de piel"	15 January 2018	N/A
35	"A punto de ser descubierto"	16 January 2018	N/A
36	"Guerra de vinos"	17 January 2018	1.18
37	"De amantes a socios"	18 January 2018	1.08
38	"El cadáver"	19 January 2018	1.13
39	"Violencia doméstica"	22 January 2018	1.22
40	"Amenazada"	23 January 2018	1.09
41	"El papel de víctima"	24 January 2018	1.31
42	"Esposos y rivales"	25 January 2018	1.21
43	"Un marido maniático"	26 January 2018	1.21
44	"Locura temporal"	29 January 2018	1.14
45	"Sorpresa con sabor amargo"	31 January 2018	1.19
46	"No más ataduras"	1 February 2018	1.14
47	"Vecina y Enemiga"	2 February 2018	1.13
48	"Yerno que saca las uñas"	5 February 2018	1.17
49	"Padre tramposo y manipulador"	6 February 2018	1.17
50	"El juego del destino"	7 February 2018	1.16
51	"Crisanto desata su furia"	8 February 2018	1.21
52	"Aurora se casará con Juanjo"	9 February 2018	1.02
53	"Roberto intoxica a su hijo"	12 February 2018	1.28
54	"El hijo de Aurora desaparece"	13 February 2018	1.32
55	"Arrestan a Juanjo"	14 February 2018	1.33
56	"A Juanjo le dan un tiro"	15 February 2018	N/A
57	"La maniobra de Roberto"	16 February 2018	N/A
58	"Sara delata a Roberto"	19 February 2018	1.38
59	"La guerra llega a su fin"	20 February 2018	1.46
