= Fabiana García Lago =

Argentine actress

- Born: Fabiana Soledad García Lago; November 23, 1974 (age 51); Buenos Aires, Argentina
- Education: Instituto Universitario Nacional del Arte
- Occupation: Actress
- Years active: 1994–present
- Notable work: Padre Coraje; Hombres de honor Sos mi vida Malparida
- Spouse: Alejandro Goldstein
- Children: 2
- Relatives: Virginia Lago (aunt)
- Awards: #Awards

Fabiana Soledad García Lago (November 23, 1974) is an Argentine actress. She has appeared in the television series Padre Coraje, Hombres de honor, Sos mi vida and Malparida.

== Biography ==
At the age of 19, Fabiana García Lago moved to Spain to begin her acting career; she wanted to avoid the influence of her acting family, as her father Juan Carlos Galván and her aunt Virginia Lago were both established stage and screen actors in Argentina. She studied with the Argentine actress Cristina Rota and returned to Argentina three years later. She also studied at the Instituto Universitario Nacional del Arte in Argentina.

Her first theatrical play was as part of the cast of "Violeta viene a nacer" (Violeta is Born), which also included her aunt Virginia. She worked in the San Martín and Cervantes theaters in Buenor Aires while also auditioning for TV roles, initially without success. She was nominated for the "Cóndor de plata" award and received the "Lauro sin cortes" ("Lauro uncut") award in 1997 for her work in the 1996 movie Flores amarillas en la ventana (Yellow Flowers in the Window). Her first notable television role as a supporting character was in the 2004 television drama Padre Coraje (Brave Father John) in which she played a mute girl. The movie was awarded the Golden Martín Fierro award in 2004. García Lago's performance in the drama program also garnered her the Clarín Award for Best New Actress as well as a nomination for the Martín Fierro "Revelación" Award, which is awarded to the year's best new actress or actor. The following year she was nominated for Best Supporting Drama Actress at the Martín Fierro Awards for her performance in Hombres de honor (Men of Honor).

In 2006 she played a Paraguayan immigrant in the comedy Sos mi vida (You Are the One). The original script did not detail the ethnic origin of her character, only that she would not be from Buenos Aires; the decision to make the character Paraguayan came after García Lago tried the Guarani language accent during the first day of filming. She later appeared in Mujeres de nadie (Women of Nobody) and Patito feo (Ugly Duckling). She was a lead actresses in the 2010 telenovela Malparida (The Wicked Girl), playing an orphan who loves her adoptive mother and sister in spite of their crimes. She currently works as an acting coach.

== Works ==
=== Television ===
- Con alma de tango - 1994
- La condena de Gabriel Doyle 1998
- Especiales de Alejandro Doria 1998
- Vulnerables 1999
- Luna Salvaje - 2000
- Laberinto - 2001
- Máximo Corazón - 2002
- Padre Coraje - 2004
- Hombres de Honor - 2005
- Algo habrán hecho por la historia argentina - 2005
- Sos mi vida - 2006
- Mujeres de nadie - 2007
- Patito feo - 2008

=== Cinema ===
- Flores amarillas en la ventana - 1996
- Buenos Aires plateada - 2000
- El buen destino - 2005
- Las manos - 2006

=== Theater ===
- Chicas católicas
- El libro de Ruth
- Los siete locos
- Brilla por ausencia
- Locos de verano
- Mariana Pineda
- Violeta viene a nacer

== Awards ==
- Flores amarillas en la ventana (Yellow Flowers in the Window) (1996)
  - 1997 - "Lauro sin cortes" (won)
  - 1997 - "Cóndor de plata" (nominated)
- Padre Coraje (Brave Father John) (2004)
  - 2004 - Clarín Award (won) for Best New Actress
  - 2004 - Martín Fierro award (nominated) for Best New Actress
- Hombres de honor (Men of Honor) (2005)
  - 2005 - Martín Fierro award (nominated) for Best Supporting Drama Actress
