= Cain and Abel (Argentine TV series) =

Argentine telenovela

Caín y Abel is an Argentine telenovela produced by Telefe. It starred Joaquín Furriel, Fabián Vena, Julieta Cardinali, Vanesa González, Federico D'Elía, Luis Machín, Virginia Lago and Luis Brandoni. The plot involves two brothers that hate each other, but it's unrelated to the Cain and Abel biblical story beyond that: they work together at a real estate firm, and fight for the love of a woman.

== Development ==
The telenovela was made to compete against the Showmatch of competitor channel 13. The theme tune was "Sin Fin", which was the first song written by Andrés Calamaro specifically for a television series. It was directed by Miguel Colom, who had worked at Vidas Robadas.

The first episode of the telenovela had a rating of 14,5.

== Cast ==
- Joaquín Furriel as Agustín Vedia
- Fabián Vena as Simón Vedia
- Julieta Cardinali as Leonora Mendóza
- Vanesa González as Valentina Paz
- Luis Brandoni as Eugenio Vedia
- Virginia Lago as Consuelo Vedia
- Federico D'Elía as Alfredo Rincón
