= Carina Zampini =

Argentine actress and television host (born 1975)

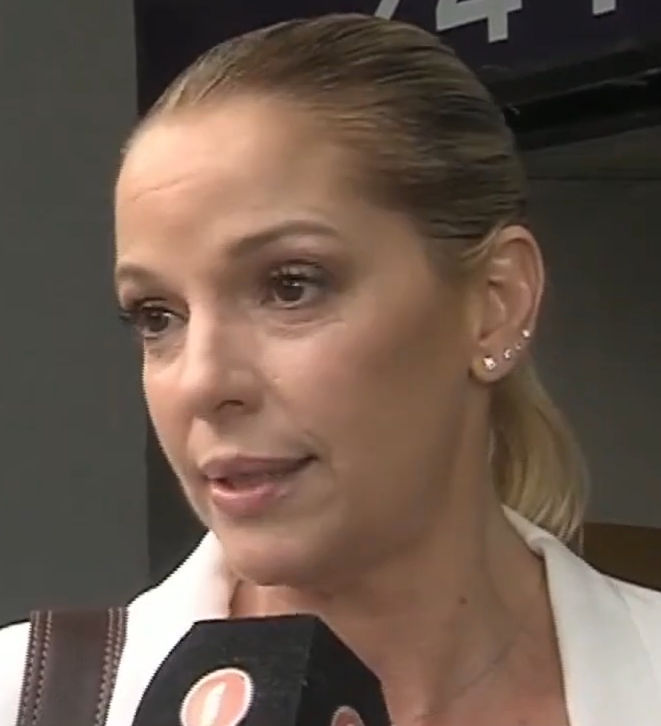
- Zampini in 2025
- Born: Carina Liliana Zampini; 12 September 1975 (age 50); Buenos Aires, Argentina
- Occupations: Actress; television host
- Years active: 1995–present
- Children: 1

Carina Liliana Zampini (born 12 September 1975) is an Argentine actress and television host.

== Biography ==
As a girl Carina began to participate in different plays. Carina, study acting since age 9.

== Career ==
As a teenager, Carina worked in a supermarket selling ceramic dishes when she went for a casting in Canal 13. Her profile did not suit a role in the soap opera Amigovios, since at 20 she was very big compared to the cast, but too small to be the teacher. However, Carina was offered a test, she improvised a monologue and this led to her career as a television actress.

Alejandro Romay, the "Zar de la televisión" wanted to sign a contract with her. The fiction chosen was a soap opera of Canal 9. In the year 1995, she was selected to play the beautiful and evil Carla Lucero. Her role was scheduled only for a couple of months, however it lasted a year and a half. Carla Lucero, the good one that became very bad, passed without identity change to Ricos y famosos, soap opera starring Natalia Oreiro and Diego Ramos. Her character was on the air for two consecutive years, consecrating it as one of the most remembered and recognized bad ones of the Argentine television. For her character she received the award Viva in 2000 to the best soap opera villain, in Israel. In the year 1998, she participated as a guest actress, playing Vera Vázquez, in Gasoleros, a soap opera of Canal 13. In the year 1999, she co-starred in the unit Por el nombre de Dios, with Alfredo Alcon and Adrián Suar. And in 2000 she was Mercedes, in Calientes, also from Canal 13 and Pol-ka, respectively. Between 2000 and 2001 she was selected to put herself in the shoes of María Méndez, protagonist of the soap opera Luna salvaje was broadcast by Telefe. That was her first protagonist as a fiction couple with the actor Gabriel Corrado. In the year 2002, the beautiful actress played Lucía Ledesma in Franco Buenaventura, el profe character who fell in love with her literature teacher, played by Osvaldo Laport. But because her co-leading role was overturned by the character of Celeste Cid, she left the cycle midway through the season. In the year 2004, she returns to play a villain in Padre Coraje. In mid 2005, Carina Zampini is integrated to the leading cast of the soap opera Hombres de honor, starring Gabriel Corrado and Laura Novoa. The following year she played Romina Franccini, protagonist of Collar de Esmeraldas, along with Osvaldo Laport, and produced by Ideas del Sur for the afternoons of Canal 13. In the year 2008 she returned to television, in the second season of Mujeres de nadie, in the character of Dr. Fernanda Almirón, another villain. A pediatrician who suffers from bipolarity and double personality. She participated in the theater play Flores de Acero, in Julia's character, along with Irma Roy, Nora Cárpena, Dorys Del Valle, María Rosa Fugazot and Mercedes Funes. With the direction in charge of Julio Baccaro. In the year 2010 she was in the comedy Rumores, with Nicolás Vázquez, Reina Reech, Andrea Frigerio, Diego Pérez, Eunice Castro, Carlos Calvo and Marcelo de Bellis. It tells the story of four couples attending a mansion on the outskirts of New York to celebrate the 30th anniversary of the marriage of one of them. In the year 2010 she returned to with Malparida, playing Martina Figueroa, counterfigure of the villain Juana Viale. Between 2012 and 2013 she starred with Sebastián Estevanez the soap opera Dulce Amor playing Victoria Bandi, a businesswoman who owns a candy empire. Due to the success of the soap opera Dulce Amor, producer Quique Estevanez summons her again to be the protagonist of Camino al Amor along with Sebastián Estevanez and again on the screen of Telefe. On June 29, 2015 she debuted as a television presenter in the morning, Morfi, todos a la mesa, next to Gerardo Rozín on Telefe. During 2017 she led the reality show Despedida de Solteros with Marley. She hosted the television show El gran premio de la cocina with Juan Marconi on the screen of Canal 13.

== Television ==
Year	Title	Character	Channel
1995-1996	Por siempre mujercitas	Carla Lucero	Canal 9
1997-1998	Ricos y Famosos	Carla Lucero	Canal 9
1998	Lo dijo papá	Verónica	Canal 9
1998	Gasoleros	Vera Vázquez	Canal 13
1999	Por el nombre de Dios	Ariana	Canal 13
2000	Calientes	Mercedes	Canal 13
2000-2001	Luna salvaje	María Méndez	Telefe
2002	Franco Buenaventura, el profe	Lucía Ledesma de Chamorro	Telefe
2003	Infieles	Leticia	Telefe
2004	Padre Coraje	Ana Guerrico	Canal 13
2005	Hombres de honor	Eva Hoffman	Canal 13
2005	Botines	Clara	Canal 13
2006	Collar de Esmeraldas	Romina Franccini	Canal 13
2008	Mujeres de nadie	Dr. Fernanda Almirón	Canal 13
2010-2011	Malparida	Martina Figueroa	Canal 13
2011	Decisiones de vida	Blanca	Canal 9
2012-2013	Dulce Amor	Victoria Bandi Ferri/Victoria Fernández Ferri	Telefe
2014	Camino al Amor	Malena Menéndez	Telefe

== Television Programs ==
Year	Program	Channel	Notes
2005	Laten corazones	Telefe	Judge
2015-2016	Morfi, todos a la mesa	Telefe	Host
2017	Despedida de Solteros	Telefe	Host
2018–Present	El gran premio de la cocina	Canal 13	Host
2019	Un sol para los chicos	Canal 13	Host

== Theater ==
Year	Title	Character
2007	Flores de acero	Julia
2008-2009	Conversaciones después del entierro	
2009-2010	Rumores	

== Awards and nominations ==
Year	Award	Category	Work	Result
1995	Martín Fierro Awards	Best Supporting Actress	Por siempre mujercitas	Winner
2000	Viva 2000 Award	Best Villain	Ricos y Famosos	Winner
2001	Martín Fierro Awards	Best Actress Novel Star	Luna salvaje	Nominated
2002	Martín Fierro Awards	Best Actress Novel Star	Luna salvaje	Nominated
2004	Martín Fierro Awards	Best Actress Novel Star	Padre Coraje	Winner
2005	Martín Fierro Awards	Best Actress Novel Star	Hombres de honor	Nominated
2012	Tato Awards	Best Leading Actress in Daily Fiction	Dulce Amor	Nominated
2013	Martín Fierro Awards	Best Leading Actress in Daily Fiction	Dulce Amor	Nominated
2014	Martín Fierro Awards	Best Leading Actress in Daily Fiction	Dulce Amor	Nominated
2016	Martín Fierro Awards	Best Female Television Presenter	Morfi, todos a la mesa	Nominated
2017	Martín Fierro Awards	Best Female Television Presenter	Morfi, todos a la mesa	Nominated
