= Virginia Lago =

Argentine actress

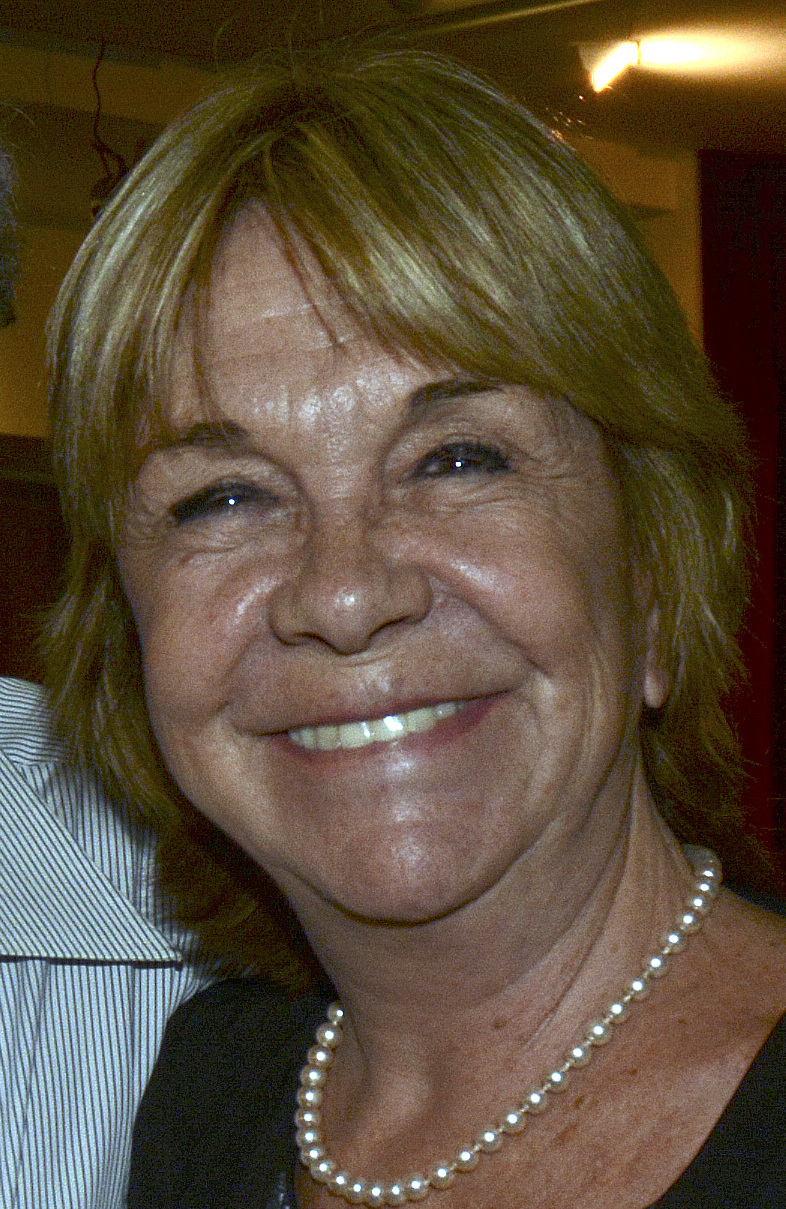
- Virginia Lago in 2016
- Born: 22 May 1946 (age 79); San Martín, Buenos Aires, Argentina
- Occupations: Actress, presenter
- Relatives: Fabiana García Lago (niece); Zully Moreno (cousin)
- Awards: Martín Fierro Awards (1990, 2008, 2013); Sea Star Award (1984, 2012)

Virginia Lago (born 22 May 1946) is an Argentine actress with an extensive career in theater, film, and television. She is best known for being the host of the popular film series Historias de corazón, broadcast by Telefe.

== Biography ==
Virginia Lago was born in San Martín in the north of Greater Buenos Aires on 22 May 1946. Until age 20 she resided in Villa Ballester. She attended primary school at Roberto Noble School No. 11, and Tomás Guido secondary school in San Martín. She is the cousin of actress Zully Moreno and the aunt of actress Fabiana García Lago.

In 1963 she had a prominent performance in the play Pygmalion. She studied Theater with Marcelo Lavalle and Roberto Durán at the Institute of Modern Art and learned from many other actors. In 1966 she appeared on the well-received program Galería Polyana, which was broadcast on weekdays from May to October on Channel 9 with scripts by the theatrical author Clara Giol Bressan and a cast that included Susana Campos, Fanny Navarro, Enzo Viena, Ricardo Passano, Patricia Shaw, Aída Luz, María José Demare, Nelly Darén, and Gloria Raines.

== Internet meme ==
As a result of the series that Virginia Lago hosted on Telefe, around March 2012, her image became the subject of an Internet meme in which her way of speaking and acting is parodied. Videos in which she is imitated have circulated on YouTube, Facebook, and Twitter. In the parodies, emphasis is placed on Lago's unhurried tone, the diminutives and temperance in her speech, and her recurring catchphrase ¡maravilloso! (wonderful) to describe a situation. Lago acknowledged that she initially cried about these jokes, but then took them with humor.

== Career ==
=== Television ===
- 1962: The Falcón Family
- 1974: Los bulbos
- 1976: El amor tiene cara de mujer
- 1984: Las 24 horas
- 1990: La bonita página
- 1991: Una mujer inolvidable
- 1991: Cosecharás tu siembra
- 1994: Alta comedia
- 1994: Más allá del horizonte
- 1995: Por siempre mujercitas
- 1997: Los herederos del poder
- 2001: Las amantes
- 2005: Mujeres Asesinas
- 2006: Montecristo
- 2008: Mujeres de nadie (villain)
- 2010: Cain and Abel
- 2011: Decisiones de vida
- 2012–2015: Historias de corazón (presenter and actress)
- 2017: Amar después de amar (Myriam Cohen – principal antagonist)

=== Film ===
- 1960: Héroes de hoy
- 1960: La patota
- 1961: Alias Gardelito
- 1962: The Terrorist
- 1963: Los inconstantes
- 1964: Un sueño y nada más
- 1964: La sentencia
- 1964: Tres historias fantásticas
- 1964: Voy a hablar de la esperanza
- 1965: By Killing (voice dubbing)
- 1966: La Gran felicidad
- 1967: ¡Al diablo con este cura!
- 1967: El loro de la soledad
- 1968: Maternidad sin hombres
- 1969: El cantor enamorado
- 1971: Juguemos en el mundo
- 1974: Muñequitas de medianoche
- 1974: El Buho
- 1975: La Raulito
- 1985: Prontuario de un argentino
- 1986: Secretos en el Monte Olvidado
- 1988: Bajo otro sol
- 1995: Fotos del alma
- 1996: El verso
- 2000: Los días de la vida

=== Theater ===
- Pygmalion by George Bernard Shaw, dir. Wilfredo Ferrán
- Two for the Seesaw by William Gibson
- Se armó la murga by Pedro Orgambide
- Sucede lo que pasa by Griselda Gambaro
- Lejana tierra prometida by Ricardo Halac, dir. Omar Grasso
- Canciones para mirar by María Elena Walsh
- La Piaf by Pam Gems, theatrical adaptation by Roberto "Tito" Cossa, dir. Rubens W. Correa.
- Vivir en vos by María Elena Walsh, theatrical adaptation by Javier Margulis, dir. Rubens W. Correa
- An Enemy of the People by Henrik Ibsen, dir. Omar Grasso
- Uncle Vanya by Anton Chekhov, dir. Roberto Durán
- Trío by Kado Kostzer, dir. Emilio Alfaro
- ¡Ay, Carmela! by José Sanchis Sinisterra, dir. Dervy Vilas
- Violeta viene a nacer by Rodolfo Braceli, adapted and directed by Rubens W. Correa and Javier Margulis
- Mariana Pineda by Federico García Lorca, dir. Jaime Kogan
- Borges Buenos Aires from texts by Jorge Luis Borges, dir. Roberto Mosca.
- Esa relación tan delicada by Loleh Bellon, dir. Manuel Iedvabni
- Frida Kahlo, la pasión by Ricardo Halac, dir. Daniel Suárez Marzal
- La Farolera by María Elena Walsh, dir. Virginia Lago
- Crimes of the Heart by Beth Henley, dir. Virginia Lago
- La Delfina, una pasión by Susana Poujol, dir. Daniel Marcove
- El ángel from texts by Federico García Lorca, dir. Virginia Lago and Daniel Marcove
- Cuentos de Hadas by Raquel Diana, dir. Virginia Lago
- Porteñas by Manuel González Gil and Daniel Botti, dir. Manuel González Gil
- Ciclo Teatro x la Identidad, Centro Cultural General San Martín
- Las mosqueteras... del rey, written and directed by Manuel González Gil
- Filumena Marturano by Eduardo De Filippo, dir. Manuel González Gil
- Robinson Crusoe...el mar by Daniel Defoe, dir. Virginia Lago
- Darse Cuenta – Teatro y Reflexión, dir. Daniel Marcove
- Por el placer de volver a verla by Michel Tremblay, adapted and directed by Manuel González Gil
- Las chicas del calendario by Tim Firth, dir. Manuel González Gil
- Calendar Girls by Ted Willis, dir. Daniel Suárez Marzal
- Milagros del corazón by Alexei Arbuzovz, dir. Manuel González Gil
- Romeo and Juliet by William Shakespeare, dir. Virginia Lago
- El ángel (2016)
- La panadera de los poetas (2017), dir. Mariana Gióvine

== Awards and nominations ==
=== Martín Fierro Awards ===
- 1990: Winner of Best Supporting Actress for La bonita página
- 1991: Nominated for Best Supporting Actress for Cosecharás tu siembra
- 2006: Nominated for Best Supporting Actress in Drama for Montecristo
- 2008: Winner of Best Supporting Actress in Drama for Mujeres de nadie
- 2011: Nominated for Best Leading Actress in Special or Miniseries for Decisiones de vida
- 2013: Winner of Best Female Host for Historias de corazón

=== Other awards ===
- 1984: Sea Star Award for Best Actress
- 1984: Prensario Award for Best Actress
- 1991: Diploma of Merit, Individual Category, from the Konex Foundation
- 1999: Podestá Award from the Argentine Actors Association
- 2009: José María Vilches Award for Por el placer de volver a verla
- 2012: Sea Star Award for Vivir en vos
- 2013: Clare of Assisi Career Award
