= Vanesa González =

Argentine actress

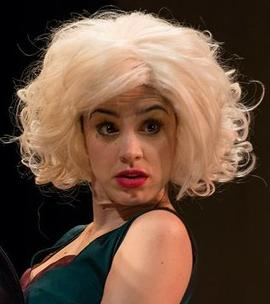
- Born: Vanesa Natalia González; February 3, 1987 (age 39); Banfield, Buenos Aires, Argentina
- Years active: 2005—present

Vanesa Natalia González (Spanish pronunciation: [baˈnesa ɣonˈsales]; born February 3, 1987, in Buenos Aires, Argentina) is an Argentine actress. She portrayed Morena Fontana in the television comedy Son de Fierro.

== Early life ==
At age 12, González begin to study theater as she continued her school education. Three years later she began theatrical lessons with the former Argentinian actor Lito Cruz. At the age of 16 she moved to Capital Federal, Buenos Aires.

== Career ==
González obtained her first role in a television program at the age of 18. She portrayed Eloisa on the teen drama 1/2 Falta.

In 2007, González received a role in the soap opera Son De Fierro playing the part of Morena Fontana.

In 2008, González played Victoria in the comedy Socias.

González also worked on several theater projects such as En el país de Perbrumón (2006) and Así de perras (2007).

González was the actress and co-writer for the musical El burdel de Paris (2008).

== Filmography ==
- Violeta (2011)
- Caín and Abel (2010)
- Lo que el tiempo nos dejó (2010)
- Socias (2008)
- Son de Fierro (2007)
- Mujeres Asesinas [2006)
- 1/2 Falta (2005)
- Las Estrellas (2017)
- Homo Argentum (2025) as Jimena
