= Jorge Sassi =

Argentine actor and humorist

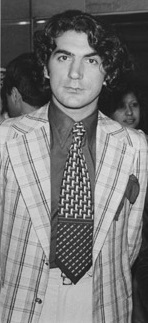
- Born: Jorge Alberto Sassi; November 17, 1947; Rafaela, Santa Fe, Argentina
- Died: February 9, 2015 (aged 67); Buenos Aires, Argentina
- Resting place: La Chacarita cemetery, Buenos Aires, Argentina
- Occupations: Actor and humorist
- Years active: 1968–2014
- Children: 1

Jorge Alberto Sassi (November 17, 1947 – February 9, 2015) was an Argentine actor and humorist.

== Biography ==
Jorge Alberto Sassi was born in the town of Rafaela 100 km west of the city of Santa Fe. He converted to Buddhism from Atheism.

== Career ==
Jorge Sassi started his career in Buenos Aires, Argentina in the late 1960s as an extra in the movie Humo de marihuana from Lucas Demare. In the 1970s he participated in several films playing minor characters in 1979 he made his first television intervention in Novia de vacaciones. In the 1980s he participated in police violence scenes. In the early 1990s he worked with Tato Bores on several programs. He participated in 30 films. He worked on many plays. He also participated in several television series, such as Amo y señor, Verano del '98, Sos mi vida and Dulce amor.

== Death ==
Jorge Sassi died on Monday February 9, 2015 at 5 a.m. at 67 years of age, after being hospitalized since November 2014 in the Sanatorio de la Providencia in Buenos Aires, Argentina due to kidney complications, specifically a chronic renal insufficiency. His remains rest in the pantheon of the Asociación Argentina de Actores of La Chacarita cemetery, Buenos Aires, Argentina.
