= Teen Angels =

Argentine pop band

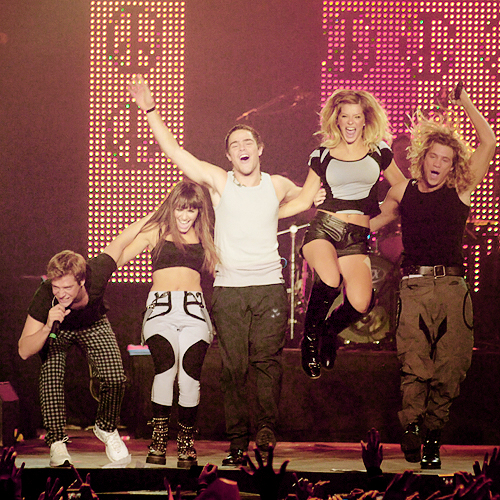
- Teen Angels

Background information
- Origin: Buenos Aires, Argentina
- Genres: Pop, dance-pop, pop rock, Latin pop
- Years active: 2007–2012
- Labels: Sony; EMI
- Past members: Gastón Dalmau; Lali Espósito; Peter Lanzani; Nico Riera; Rocío Igarzábal; China Suárez
- Website: Official Website

Teen Angels was an Argentine pop band formed from the TV series Casi Ángeles. Its original members were Lali Espósito (known professionally as Lali), Peter Lanzani, Nicolás Riera, Gastón Dalmau and China Suárez, who would be replaced in 2011 by Rochi Igarzábal.

Teen Angels recorded six studio albums and three live albums. Teen Angels 2 was certified double platinum, Teen Angels, Teen Angels 3 and Teen Angels 4 Platinum and gold Teen Angels 5 by CAPIF.

The band gave concerts and embarked on promotions in different cities in Argentina, and in countries such as Peru, Chile, Israel, Spain, Uruguay, Mexico, Venezuela, Panama, Costa Rica, Guatemala, Dominican Republic, Ecuador, Brazil and Italy.

In 2011, the band went independent from the TV series and Sony Music. During that year, they released a fifth record, TeenAngels 5, a new sound, showing a more mature profile of the Band. In addition, tour dates were announced for Argentina, Israel, Uruguay and Peru; this tour also featured the band opening for the Femme Fatale Tour of Britney Spears, when she performed at the Estadio Ciudad de La Plata, La Plata, Argentina.

In March 2012, it was confirmed that the band would separate and, after a series of farewell shows at the Teatro Gran Rex, they gave their last show on October 8 at the Orfeo Superdomo, Córdoba, Argentina.

On May 30, 2013, the Argentine cinema released a recording of their final show, which was called Teen Angels: El Adiós.

== Career ==
=== Beginnings with Casi Ángeles ===
The group emerged following the release of the album Teen Angels I, which contained the music of the 2007 TV series. Emilia Attías, Gastón Dalmau, Lali Espósito, Peter Lanzani, Nicolás Riera and China Suárez were the main performers with the participation of Nicolás Vázquez. The content of the songs was related to the facts narrated in the telenovela and one of them, Voy por más, became the first single.

The band gave support to Casi Ángeles a series of recitals at the Teatro Gran Rex in Buenos Aires, Argentina during that year.

=== 2008–2009: From fiction to reality ===
In 2008, the band transcended the fiction and edited Teen Angels II (already without the presence of Emilia Attias and Nicolas Vázquez). The disc contained 13 songs, three of them interpreted by Attias and Vázquez. The singles of this album were A ver si pueden and A decir que si, being crowned during that year, this first, like one of the ten most popular songs of America according to The Associated Press. Teen Angels 2 received the gold disc, only two days after its release, and then was awarded double platinum in Argentina.

This album toured several Argentine provinces such as Córdoba, Santa Fe, Mendoza and Salta. And they made their first show in Uruguay in front of 10 thousand spectators.

At the end of 2008 they signed a contract for Coca-Cola releasing the song and the video clip, Hoy Quiero.

The third season began on April 20, 2009 on Telefé, giving way to the release of the third studio album called homonymous, Teen Angels III (following the trend of the previous). His broadcasting court was Que Nos Volvamos A Ver. The album became platinum in Argentina. They also presented the second single, Vuelvo a casa, in the middle of the year.

In July they recorded the video clip Cada Vez Que Sale El Sol, a cover of the song performed by the Argentine singer Sergio Denis, for the new campaign of the brand Coca-Cola. The track was included as a bonus track on his second live album recorded at the Gran Rex Theater, which went on sale on August 25, also corresponding to the play of the third season of the series.

The 27 of September are presented for the first time in Madrid, Spain, in the Telefónica Flagship Store de la Gran Vía in a showcase for guests and press, like promotion of the cd.

On October 3, they gave their first concert in Israel for a series of performances at the Menora Mivtachim Arena in Tel Aviv, performing 13 functions with more than 78,000 spectators. Right there they recorded a song in Hebrew, El lugar real, and they released a special album and DVD TeenAngels En Vivo: From Israel. Due to its enormous success and popularity, the State of Israel issued stamps with the photos of the band. There were a total of eleven postage stamps: two of each member of the group and another of the five together. In the last quarter of the year, Teen Angels made their first promotional tour of Chile, Peru, Venezuela, Guatemala, Dominican Republic, Costa Rica and Italy.

With the arrival of the holidays, the quintet recorded a new song called Navidad and a new video for Coca-Cola and his campaign La magia está con vos. And they received in Spain the award 40 principales, to the best artist of Argentina.

=== 2010: Last year with Casi Ángeles ===
In March, Teen Angels returned to Israel to promote the release of the CD + DVD pack (exclusive for that country) Live from Israel recorded the previous year and gave a show in Spain on March 23 at the Palacio Vistalegre in Madrid. There was filmed the video clip of "Miedo A Perderte" produced by Carlos Jean, an advance of the fourth studio album, titled Teen Angels IV. On May 22 they performed in Madrid at a concert, which promoted taking care of the environment. For that, the group was presented in the framework of the celebrations of the Día Mundial de la Biodiversidad organized by the magazine Bravo. There they released their video clip Bravo por la Tierra in order to raise awareness in defense of the planet.

The song Vos Ya Sabés was the tuning head of the fourth season of the series, and first single of his fourth album. Followed by Miedo a perderte. This fourth album came to be crowned platinum. In May 2010 they visit Brazil, where they do a promotional tour and present their album Quase Anjos which contains the Portuguese versions of A ver si pueden (called: Vamos ver quem pode) and one of A decir que sí (called: Dizer que sim) respectively .

In July they began a series of presentations at the Teatro Gran Rex in Buenos Aires. in addition to an Argentine national tour as a reason for the farewell of the television series.

Later they toured with concerts in Chile and Peru, and for the second consecutive year they obtained the 40 main prize, to the best Argentine artist, in Spain.

On July 27, Teen Angels: La Historia was released, a CD + DVD containing an unpublished song: No Te Digo Adiós, created to end the series Casi Ángeles.

=== 2011: Post Casi Ángeles ===
In January 2011, China Suárez left the band, and was replaced by Rocío Igarzábal, who was part of the cast of the television strip and had participated in the albums Teen Angels II, Teen Angels III and Teen Angels IV.

During that year, the members presented a new tour started on January 22 in Punta del Este. This included four dates in Israel (three in March and one in October) and two free shows in La Plata and Tigre. Also, it toured the city of Montevideo, Uruguay and some argentine cities.

The tour touted the new album titled Teen Angels V, which won the Golden Disc Award in August 2011. Three singles were released from the tour: the first, entitled Que Llegue Tu Voz, was recorded at the Gran Rex Theater and reached high positions; the song Mírame, Mírate had a videoclip shot in Cataratas del Iguazú; and Loco, the most controversial, showed the band in a more sensual and mature context. In October 2011, they receive the Kids Choice Awards Argentina, for the favorite latin group.

Amid a controversy over the recruitment, on November 20, the band performed at the opening of the Femme Fatale Tour of Britney Spears in the city of La Plata. To close the year, on December 13 the quintet was presented in Lima, Peru for the launch of the Yups TV channel Cris Morena Group.

=== 2012: Separation ===
By 2012, several members had additional work to the band and rumors of a possible separation had begun.

On February 28 came the first issue of the sixth studio album La Despedida in the telenovela Dulce amor, which features in its cast with Nicolás Riera and Rocío Igarzábal. The unpublished song sung to duet by both was called Perfect Integrity.

On April 17, 2012, the new record material was released, which includes "Baja El Telón" (the first single), "Arriga en forma de amor" (second single) and "Integridad perfecta" (never an official single) as well as new versions of its previous themes. Also, they recorded a special participation for the telenovela of Telefe and they appeared in the talent show La Voz Argentina.

On October 8, the last show was held in the city of Cordoba before more than 20,000 people, after their performances at the Teatro Gran Rex. Lali Espósito explained that the reasons had to do with the incompatibility of the different careers of the members, "If we made the decision to continue it would be difficult to get together, go on tour, because Nico and Rochi are recording Dulce Amor, Peter is in La Dueña, Gas is going to New York City and i premiered with Las Brujas de Salem.

== Movie ==
During the month of September of 2012, the Yups channel made the official cinema presentation of Teen Angels: el adiós (Teen Angels: the goodbye) 3D. The film shows the last recital held at the Teatro Gran Rex in Buenos Aires and was presented in a single screening in Peru.

On May 30, 2013, it premiered in theaters throughout Argentina, and managed to break attendance records in its first weekend of release.

== Image and products ==
Teen Angels was the face of a large number of licensed products. Stationery, posters, postcards, furniture, clothing lines, perfumes, among other products launched during seasons 2 and 3. An official store, the Fans Store, is located in the Unicenter shopping center, Buenos Aires. 2009 was released a free online video game called Audition TeenAngels. The game features songs from the show, dress of the characters and other contents of the strip. The MMORPG was created by Axeso 5 being released in 2009. Also at the end of the same year was released a limited version of the Lenovo G450 notebook, it had a design related to the fiction, besides owning in its disc content of the program.

== Members ==
- Gastón Dalmau (2007–2012)
- Nicolás Riera (2007–2012)
- Peter Lanzani (2007–2012)
- Lali Espósito (2007–2012)
- China Suárez (2007–2010)
- Rocío Igarzábal (2011–2012)

== See also ==
- Erreway
