= Rocío Igarzábal =

Argentine actress and singer

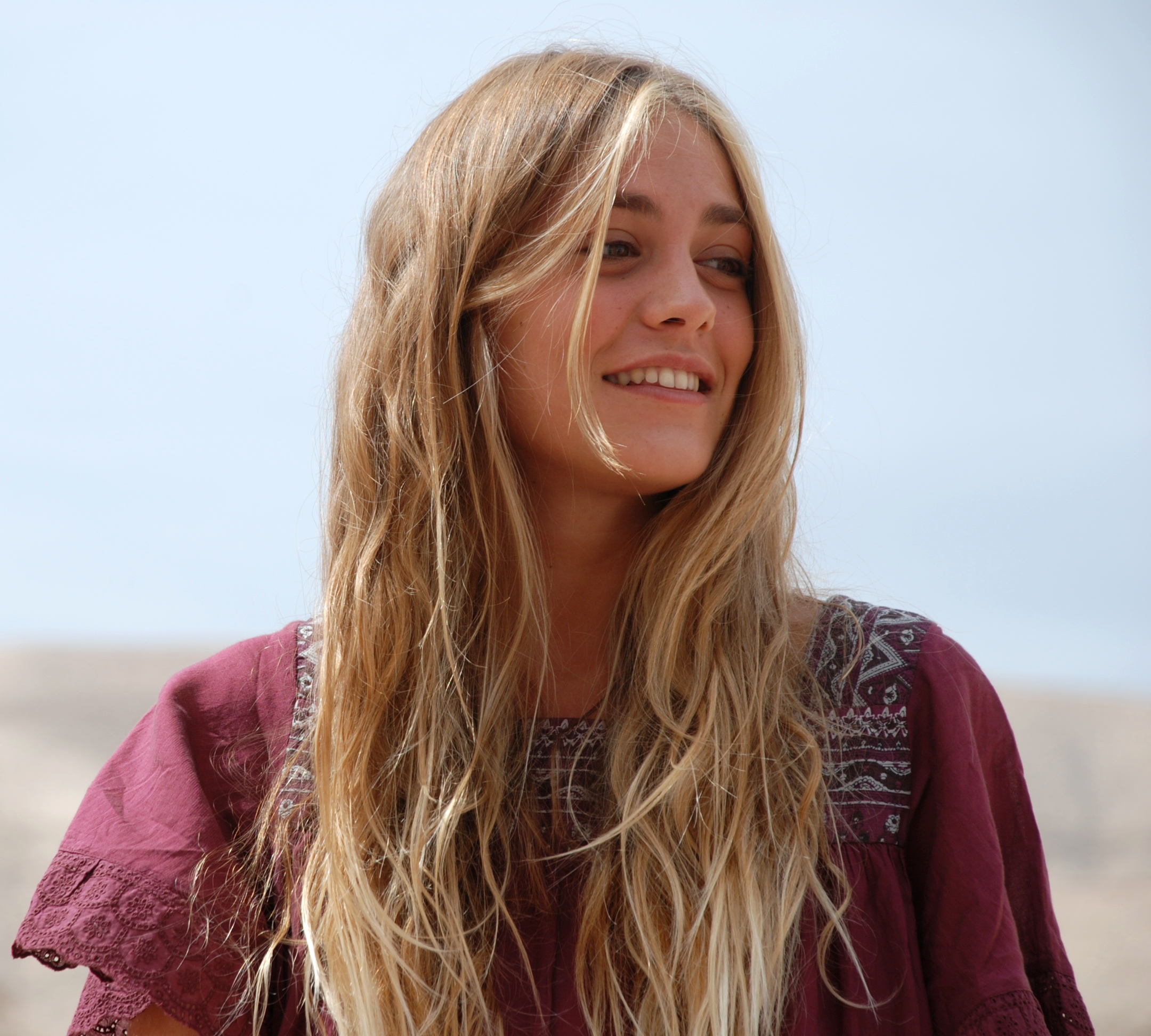
- Born: August 24, 1989 (age 37); San Isidro, Buenos Aires, Argentina
- Other name: Rochi Igarzábal
- Occupations: Actress; Singer
- Years active: 2008–present
- Partner: Milton Cámara (2015-present)
- Children: 1

Rocío Igarzábal (born August 24, 1989, in San Isidro, Buenos Aires, Argentina), also known as Rochi Igarzábal, is an Argentine actress and singer.

== Biography ==
Her parents are called Joaquín and Adriana, she has two sisters, Martina and Lucía. She is the second niece of the actress Soledad Silveyra.

== Career ==
In 2008 Rocío Igarzábal made her television debut when she was chosen for the role of Valeria "Vale" Gutiérrez in the television series Casi Ángeles. In 2011 she joined the pop group Teen Angels replacing María Eugenia Suárez. During 2012 and 2013 she played Brenda Bandi in the television series Dulce Amor issued by Telefe. In 2013 she debuted on the big screen with the documentary Teen Angels: El Adiós. In 2013 until the beginning of 2014 she starred alongside Gabriel Corrado the television series Taxxi, amores cruzados issued by Telefe. In 2015 she stars in cinema El desafío with Nicolás Riera and Gastón Soffritti, shot during 2014.

== Personal life ==
From 2008 to 2011 Rocío Igarzábal was in a relationship with her co–star Pablo Martínez. From 2012 to 2014 Rocío Igarzábal was in a relationship with her co–star Nicolás Riera. Since 2015 Rocío Igarzábal is in a relationship with the musician Milton Cámara. On June 7, 2016, she gave birth to their first daughter and they called her Lupe Cámara.

== Filmography ==
=== Television ===
| Year | Title | Character | Channel |
|---|---|---|---|
| 2008-2010 | Casi Ángeles | Valeria Gutiérrez | Telefe |
| 2011 | Supertorpe | Lucía | Disney Channel / Telefe |
| 2012-2013 | Dulce Amor | Brenda Bandi Ferri | Telefe |
| 2013-2014 | Taxxi, amores cruzados | Agustina Sorrento / Tania Shelley | Telefe |
| 2021 | Conflictos de blogs | Yasmin Torres | Disney+ |

=== Theater ===
| Year | Title | Character |
|---|---|---|
| 2008-2010 | Casi Ángeles | Valeria "Vale" Gutiérrez |
| 2011-2012 | Teen Angels | |
| 2018 | El violinista en el tejado | Hodel |
| 2022 | Una noche en el hotel | Luz |

=== Movies ===
| Year | Movie | Character | Director |
|---|---|---|---|
| 2013 | Teen Angels: El Adiós | Herself | Juan Manuel Jiménez |
| 2015 | El desafío | Julieta | Juan Manuel Rampoldi |
| 2020 | Encontrados | Malva | Diego Musiak |

=== Television Programs ===
| Year | Program | Channel | Notes |
|---|---|---|---|
| 2018 | Casting Móvil: Los elegidos | Quiero música en mi idioma | Judge |
| 2019 | Pasapalabra | eltrece | Paticipant |
| 2020 | Cantando por un Sueño 2020 | eltrece | Guest in the Ritmo en trio by Agustín Sierra and Inbal Comedi |
| 2021 | Showmatch | eltrece | Participant |
| 2022 | La Voz Argentina | Digital platform | Digital host |
| 2022 | La Voz - El regreso | Telefe | Host |

== Discography ==
=== Studio albums ===
List of studio albums, with selected details and chart positions
| Title | Studio album details | Peaks |
| Title | Studio album details | ARG |
|---|---|---|
| Entre los árboles | Released: March 21, 2014 (ARG); Label: Self-released; Formats: CD, digital download | 13 |

=== Singles ===
List of singles showing year released and album name
| Title | Year | Album |
|---|---|---|
| "Mira Garúa" | 2017 | Entre los árboles |
| "Iluminar" | 2017 | Entre los árboles |
| “Vuelve” | 2018 | |
| “Sin Tu Querer” | 2019 | |
| “Antes De Partir” | 2019 | |
| “Temor” | 2020 | |
| “No Quiero” | 2020 | |
