= Gastón Dalmau =

Argentinian actor and singer (born 1983)

Gastón Dalmau Arroquy
- Dalmau in 2020
- Born: Gastón Dalmau Arroquy; 23 November 1983 (age 42); Coronel Suárez, Buenos Aires, Argentina
- Occupations: Actor, singer, model, spokesperson
- Partner: José Navarro
- Musical career
- Genre: Pop
- Instruments: Vocals, guitar
- Years active: 2004—present
- Label: Sony BMG
- Formerly of: Teen Angels

Gastón Dalmau Arroquy (born 23 November 1983) is an Argentine actor and singer. He is best known for playing Ramiro "Rama" Ordóñez in the Cris Morena television series Casi Ángeles, and as a member of the music group Teen Angels. He currently resides in Los Angeles.

== Career ==
In 2017, Dalmau made an announcement on Twitter that he would join the crew and cast of Captain Marvel (2019).

== Personal life ==
Gastón Dalmau was born the youngest of three boys on 23 November 1983 in Coronel Suárez, Buenos Aires. He has two older brothers. Dalmau cites Charly García as his idol and favourite singer He also plays guitar . Dalmau admires sports such as swimming, tennis and football, and in football he supports Boca Juniors.

In 2012, after seeing the public success of his role in Casi Ángeles and the separation of the band, Dalmau moved to New York to start over. He then moved to Los Angeles after he got a job at Marvel Studios. On September 24, 2019, he announced on his Instagram that he had obtained his US citizenship. He is openly gay, and was in a relationship with Spanish community manager José Navarro but has since broken up in 2026.

== Filmography ==
| Year | Title | Role | Notes |
|---|---|---|---|
| 2004 | Frecuencia 04 | Gastón | 3 episodes |
| 2004 | La Niñera | Pity | Main cast |
| 2005 | Casados con Hijos | Nicanor | 2 episodes |
| 2005 | Floricienta | Lloako | Main cast |
| 2006 | Alma Pirata | Pity | Episode: "Piloto" |
| 2006 | You Are the One | Nicolas | 4 episodes |
| 2007–2010 | Casi Ángeles | Ramiro "Rama" Ordóñez | Main cast |
| 2012 | Dulce amor | Pablo | Main cast |
| 2013 | Yups TV | Conductor | 1 episode |
| 2014 | Quase Anjos: A Série | Ramiro-rama-Ordóñez | Episode: "Piloto" |

== Discography ==
| Year | Title |
|---|---|
| 2007 | Teen Angels 1 |
| 2008 | Teen Angels 2 |
| 2008 | Teen Angels en vivo en el Gran Rex |
| 2009 | Teen Angels 3 |
| 2009 | Teen Angels en vivo en el Gran Rex |
| 2010 | Teen Angels 4 |
| 2010 | Teen Angels: La Historia |
| 2011 | Teen Angels 5 |
| 2012 | Teen Angels: La Despedida |

== Theater ==
| Year | Title | Role | Notes |
|---|---|---|---|
| 2007–2010 | Casi Ángeles | Ramiro "rama" Ordoñez | Casi Ángeles concert series |
| 2011 | Teen Angels | Gastón Dalmau | |
| 2012 | Teen Angels: La despedida | Gastón Dalmau | |
