= Laura Novoa =

Argentine actress

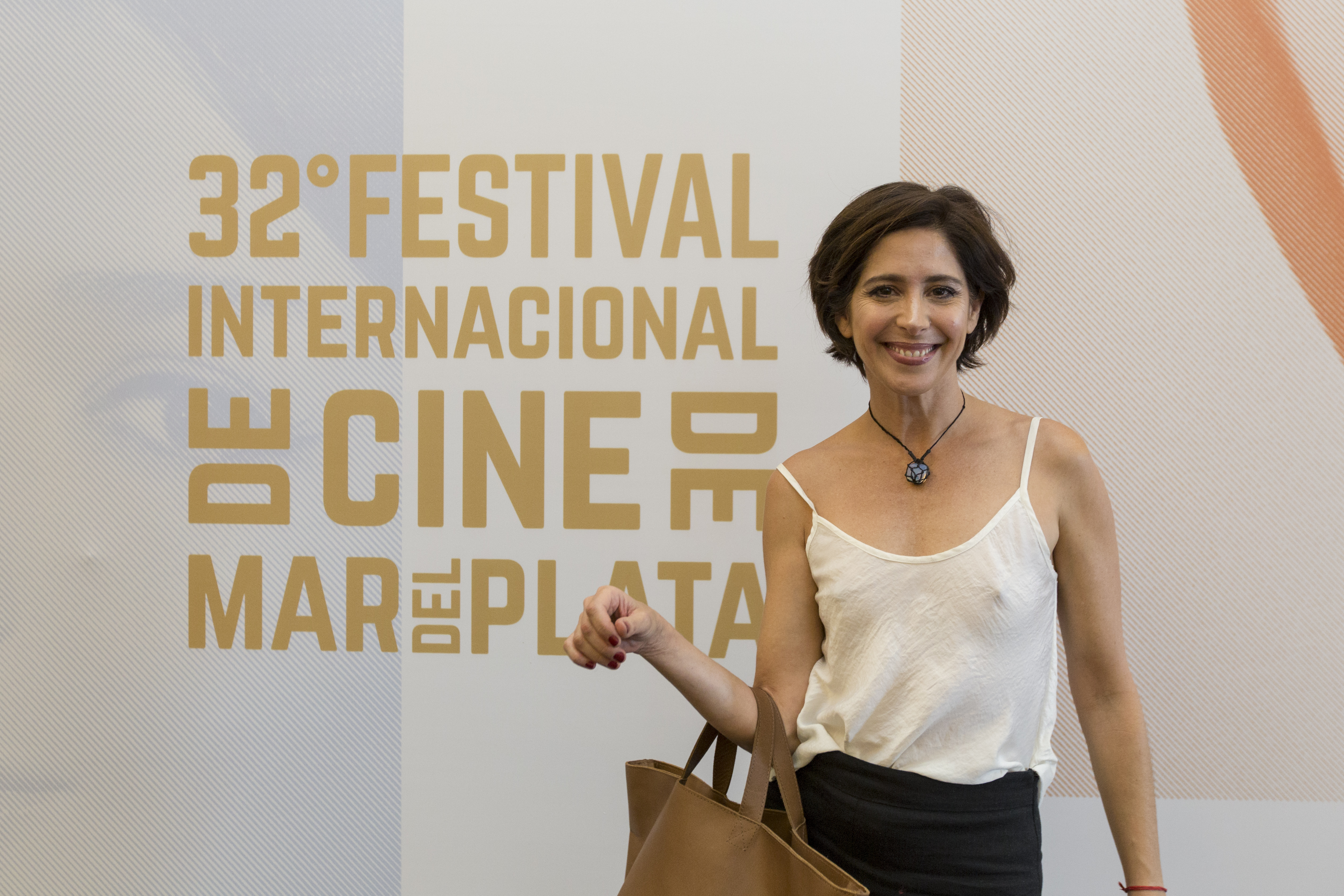
- Laura Novoa
- Born: 8 January 1969 (age 57); Buenos Aires, Argentina
- Occupation: Actress
- Years active: 1988-present

Laura Novoa (born 8 January 1969) is an Argentine actress. She appeared in more than thirty films since 1988.

== Awards ==
=== Nominations ===
- 2013 Martín Fierro Awards
  - Best actress of daily drama (for Dulce amor)
