= María Onetto =

Argentine actress (1966–2023)

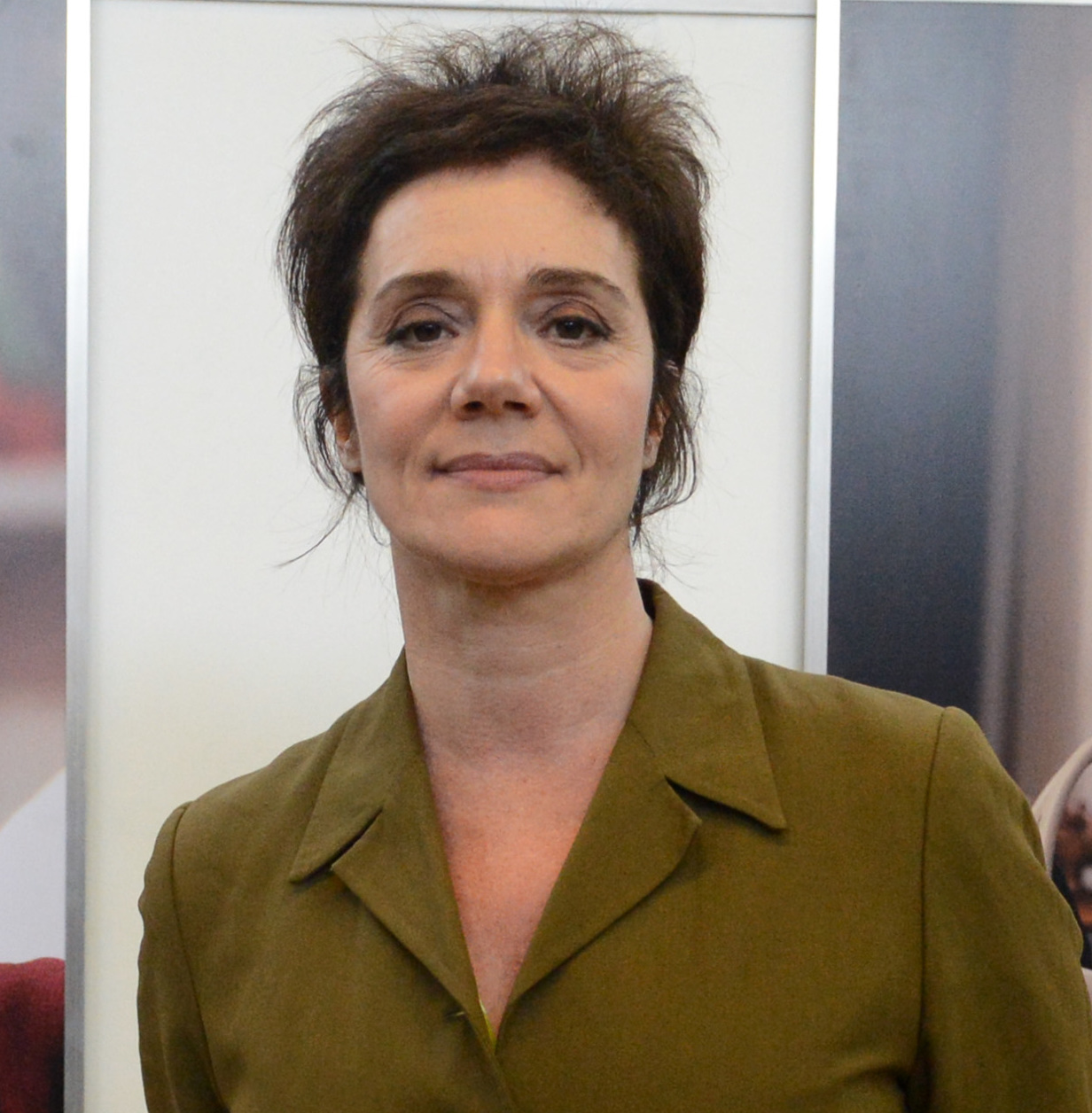
- María Onetto in 2014.
- Born: 18 August 1966; Buenos Aires
- Died: 2 March 2023 (aged 56); Buenos Aires
- Occupation: Actor

María Onetto (18 August 1966 – 2 March 2023) was an Argentine theatre, film, and television actress. She received the 2011 Konex Award in entertainment for her theatrical work, and is also well known for her role in the 2006 Argentine TV series Montecristo, for which she won the Clarín and Martín Fierro Awards as best actress in drama and rising star. She also directed a localized production of rock musical Passing Strange in 2011.

Onetto was born in Buenos Aires on 18 August 1966. She was the daughter of Estela Mary Pastore and Jorge Onetto, an employee of the energy company Segba (Servicios Eléctricos del Gran Buenos Aires) and restaurateur who died of a sudden myocardial infarction in 1967 when María was one year old. The family lived in the suburb of Martínez, Buenos Aires. She was enrolled in a Catholic school, and at age 17 she began studying psychology at the University of Buenos Aires, where she took up acting in the theater. She graduated in four years and for a time worked in the same school as her mother, preparing psycho-pedagogical reports. In 1991 she entered Sportivo Teatral, Ricardo Bartís's theater workshop, which she greatly enjoyed. After taking classes there, she taught other actors. She left in 1996, planning to study literature, and moved to Benavídez, Argentina, but found she did want to be an actress, which she began with Rafael Spregelburd's production Dragging the Cross, (Note: Arrastrando la cruz) after which she ceased other work to focus solely on acting.

Onetto starred in Lucrecia Martel's 2008 film The Headless Woman, playing Veroníca, a middle-aged woman who becomes haunted by guilt and disconnected from her normal life after a hit and run with an unidentified object.

Onetto featured in a 2021 production of Eduardo "Tato" Pavlovsky's 1987 play Potestad (lit. Power) directed by Norman Briski, which takes inspiration from Noh theater and in which Onetto plays a male girl's kidnapper during Argentina's last dictatorship.

Maria Onetto was found dead in her apartment in Buenos Aires on 2 March 2023, at the age of 56. Information released by the Buenos Aires City Police confirmed that she had died by suicide.

== Film ==
- 2000: Lejanía (short film)
- 2005: Cuatro mujeres descalzas
- 2006: La punta del diablo
- 2007: The Other, as the hotel receptionist
- 2007: Arizona sur, as the patron
- 2008: The Headless Woman, as Verónica
- 2008: Horizontal / Vertical, as Guadalupe
- 2009: Nunca estuviste tan adorable, as Blanca
- 2009: Rompecabezas, as María del Carmen
- 2013: El cerrajero
- 2014: The Seagull (adaptation)
- 2014: Wild tales
- 2015: La vida después
- 2016: 2001: Mientras Kubrick estaba en el espacio, as Felipe's mother
- 2017: The Heavy Hand of the Law

== Television ==
- 2004: El disfraz, as Dra. Lavalle
- 2005: Mujeres asesinas 1
  - Episode 3: Claudia, cuchillera
  - Episode 10: Stella, huérfana emocional
  - Episode 19: Patricia, vengadora
- 2006: Montecristo, as Leticia Lombardo
- 2008: Mujeres asesinas 4; Episode 11: "Noemí, desquiciada"
- 2009: Tratame bien, as Elsa
- 2010: Lo que el tiempo nos dejó
- 2011: Televisión x la inclusión; Chapter 11: "Daños y prejuicios"
- 2012: 23 pares
- 2014: Santos y pecadores: Televisión x la justicia; Chapter 6: "Lazos que duelen"
- 2014: La celebración; Chapter 4: "Bautismo"
- 2014: En terapia
- 2016: La pulsera
- 2017: Mis noches sin ti
- 2018–2019: Mi hermano es un clon, as Elena Mónaco
- 2023: Ringo, gloria y muerte

== Theater ==
- 2011: Los hijos se han dormido
- 2013: Sonata de Otoño
- 2016: Idénticos
- 2017: Sobre Mirjana y los que la rodean
- 2017: Pequeño estado de gracia
- 2019: La persona deprimida
- 2021: Hipólita Pondera la Conquista
- 2021: Potestad

== Awards and nominations ==
Year	Award	Category	Work	Result
2001	Clarín Awards	Actress, theater	La escala humana	Winner
2006	Martín Fierro Awards	Rising star (Artista revelación)	Montecristo	Winner
2006	Clarín Awards	Actress, TV Drama	Montecristo	Winner
2008	Silver Condor Award for Best Film	Actress, leading	The Headless Woman	Winner
2011	Konex Awards	Actress, theater	2001-2010	Winner
