= Tiempos compulsivos =

- Genre: Drama
- Created by: Adrián Suar
- Written by: Javier Daulte; Bruno Luciani
- Directed by: Daniel Barone
- Starring: Rodrigo de la Serna; Paola Krum; Fernán Mirás; Gloria Carrá; Juan Minujín; Marilú Marini; Carla Peterson; Marcelo D'Andrea; Maruja Bustamante; Pilar Gamboa; Guillermo Arengo; Julieta Vallina
- Theme music composer: Fito Páez
- Opening theme: En esta ciudad
- Country of origin: Argentina
- Original language: Spanish
- No. of seasons: 1
- No. of episodes: 27

Production
- Executive producer: Diego Andrasnik
- Producer: Pol-ka
- Running time: 60 minutes

Original release
- Network: Canal 13
- Release: August 29, 2012 – March 7, 2013

Related
- Condicionados; Signos

Tiempos compulsivos is an Argentine miniseries. Created by Adrián Suar, written by Javier Daulte, produced by Pol-ka and it was issued by Canal 13 from August 29, 2012 until March 7, 2013. It stars Rodrigo de la Serna, Paola Krum, Fernán Mirás, Gloria Carrá, Juan Minujín, Marilú Marini, Carla Peterson, Marcelo D'Andrea, Maruja Bustamante, Pilar Gamboa, Guillermo Arengo and Julieta Vallina.

== Plot ==
Tiempos compulsivos happens in a therapeutic space that houses outpatients with severe compulsions, some associated with pathologies in the psychiatric environment. The experienced Dr. Ricardo Buso (Fernán Mirás) will be in charge of a group of people with ailments of various kinds, Inés Alonso (Carla Peterson) compulsive to accumulation, obsessive of order and with eating disorders, Teresa Guglietti (Gloria Carrá) she has multiple personalities, always bidding to prevail over one another, Esteban Soldeyra (Rodrigo de la Serna) a mythomaniac psychopath but with an overwhelming lucidity, Gerardo Romero (Guillermo Arengo) workaholic and constant connectivity and Sofía Muntabski (Pilar Gamboa) she has her body plagued with wounds and scars that she inflicts herself to dull deeper pains. In daily group meetings, Ricardo will try to alleviate the discomfort that afflicts his patients, along with his faithful colleague and friend, Ezequiel Lambert (Juan Minujín) and a new doctor who joins this multidisciplinary work the psychologist Julieta Despeyroux (Paola Krum) This team of professionals will make them face their fears, their anguishes and desires, being the axis of their own dramas and, sometimes, the reflection or multiplication of the trauma of the other. In some moments, the therapists will observe them through the mirrored glass of the Chamber of Gesell, without this meaning that on one side there are the healthy and on the other the sick, doctors also suffer and will have to fight against their "own ghosts” similar to those that alter the well-being of their patients.

== Cast ==
=== Protagonists ===
- Fernán Mirás as Ricardo Buso
- Carla Peterson as Inés Alonso
- Gloria Carrá as Teresa Guglietti
- Rodrigo de la Serna as Esteban Soldeyra
- Juan Minujín as Ezequiel Lambert
- Paola Krum as Julieta Despeyroux
- Guillermo Arengo as Gerardo Romero
- Pilar Gamboa as Sofía Muntabski

=== Co-protagonists ===
- Marilú Marini as May Lapage
- Marcelo D'Andrea as Silvio
- Maruja Bustamante as Gaby
- Julieta Vallina as Clara Arismendi

=== Participations ===
- Arturo Goetz as Gregorio Soldeyra
- Gonzalo Heredia as Fabián Mineli
- Romina Gaetani as Tania
- Florencia Peña as Lara
- Rafael Spregelburd as Sebastián
- Carola Reyna as Anita
- María Abadi as Julieta
- Sofía Brito as Adriana
- Diego Rosental as Julito
