= Ekaterina Ojeda =

Argentine model and industrial design student (born 2004)

- Born: May 2004 (age 22); Buenos Aires, Argentina
- Occupations: Model; Industrial design student
- Years active: 2026–present
- Parent(s): Tatiana Satiukova; César Ojeda

Ekaterina Ojeda (born May 2004) is an Argentine model and industrial design student.

She gained public attention in 2026 following media coverage surrounding an encounter involving footballer Mauro Icardi at a nightclub in Buenos Aires. Following the media coverage, she began pursuing professional modeling opportunities and joined World Marketing Models.

== Early life and education ==
Ojeda was born in Buenos Aires, Argentina, in May 2004 to Tatiana Satiukova, who is of Russian origin, and César Ojeda. She attended Bede's Grammar School in Pilar, where she participated in extracurricular activities including acting, singing, violin and athletics, particularly the long jump.

During the COVID 19 pandemic, she continued strength training and exercising at home with her father.

After completing secondary school, Ojeda enrolled in the Common Basic Cycle (CBC) in Industrial Design.

She has stated that she intends to specialize in transportation design with a focus on the automotive industry. Ojeda has cited Pagani Automobili as her favourite automobile manufacturer and has expressed an interest in designing luxury automobiles and automotive components.

== Career ==
Before entering the public spotlight, Ojeda had participated in informal modeling opportunities and had submitted photographs to modeling agencies.

Following increased media attention in late June 2026, her social media following increased significantly, and she reported receiving inquiries from brands and modeling agencies.

She subsequently signed with World Marketing Models.

Ekaterina is currently working for several brands in Argentina and will be featured in the next season of MasterChef Argentina.

== Public attention ==
In June 2026, Ojeda became the subject of media coverage after publicly describing an encounter involving Mauro Icardi and actress China Suárez at the Buenos Aires nightclub Tequila.

Ojeda later stated that she had not intended to seek publicity from the incident and described the subsequent media attention as unexpected.

She also stated that she intended to focus on the professional opportunities resulting from her increased public profile.

== Personal life ==
Ojeda has stated that she divides her time between the homes of her separated parents in Benavídez, Buenos Aires Province.

Outside modeling, she has expressed an interest in industrial and automotive design, athletics, and assisting her mother in preparing Russian cuisine for cultural food fairs.
