= Abzurdah (book) =

2006 autobiographical book by Argentine author Cielo Latini

- Author: Cielo Latini
- Language: Spanish
- Subject: Anorexia, bulimia, self-injury, BPD
- Genre: Autobiography
- Published: 2006
- Publication place: Argentina
- Pages: 290

Abzurdah is a 2006 autobiographical book by Argentine author Cielo Latini. It was adapted to an eponymous film in 2015.

== Creation ==
The book was written as an autobiography of Cielo Latini, who was a teenager at the time. Born in La Plata, she started and dropped studies of Journalism. She fell in love with a man, and developed anorexia and bulimia in her attempts to improve her physical image. She was the webmaster of a page that encouraged girls to stop eating. She attempted to commit suicide when her boyfriend left her, but was stopped, and started a treatment to be cured of her bulimia and anorexia. She told her story at Conflictos en red, and got a new boyfriend. This gave her the idea to write a book about her eating disorders, her rocky relation with her old boyfriend, and her attempted suicide.

== Reception ==
The book was a big success, and Latini was interviewed at several TV and radio programs about it, including Almorzando con Mirtha Legrand. She then started tours to present the book in other Latin American countries. The film renewed the interest in the book.

The book received mixed reviews, as some reviewers considered it an intelligent treatment of eating disorders, while others thought that it made an apology of anorexia instead. Latini pointed that she is well aware that anorexia is an eating disorder.

== Adaptations ==
The book has been adapted by an eponymous film, starring María Eugenia Suárez. The film was made a decade after the release of the book, and Latini was not involved with the production. She praised the work of actresses Suárez and Gloria Carrá, and director Daniela Goggi. She pointed that the film is more focused on the love story, while the book has more detail about the eating disorders.
