= Argentina, tierra de amor y venganza =

Argentine telenovela

- Genre: Telenovela
- Created by: Leandro Calderone; Carolina Aguirre
- Directed by: Sebastián Pivotto; Martín Sabán
- Creative director: Bernardo Losada
- Starring: Benjamín Vicuña; Gonzalo Heredia; María Eugenia Suárez; Albert Baró; Delfina Chaves; Fernán Mirás; Andrea Frigerio; Virginia Innocenti
- Opening theme: "Cien Años" by Abel Pintos
- Country of origin: Argentina
- Original language: Spanish
- No. of seasons: 2
- No. of episodes: 330

Production
- Executive producer: Diego Carabelli
- Producer: Adrián Suar
- Cinematography: Pablo Rocco; Alejandro de Campo
- Camera setup: Multi-camera
- Production company: Pol-ka Producciones

Original release
- Network: El Trece
- Release: 11 March 2019 – 29 September 2023

Argentina, tierra de amor y venganza (Argentina, Land of Love and Revenge, sometimes shortened as "ATAV") is an Argentine telenovela produced by Pol-ka Producciones that premiered on 11 March 2019 on El Trece. It is written by Leandro Calderone and Carolina Aguirre and directed by Sebastián Pivotto and Martín Sabán. It stars María Eugenia Suárez, Benjamín Vicuña, Gonzalo Heredia, Albert Baró, Delfina Chaves, Fernán Mirás, Andrea Frigerio and Virginia Innocenti. The telenovela is set in Argentina in the 1930s, in times of prosperity and progress as well as the wave of mainly European immigration in Argentina and political and economic decline.

On 5 March 2020, Adrián Suar confirmed that the series had been renewed for a second season, which was originally scheduled to premiere in 2021, finally the filming was done in 2022 and emission was on 2023.

== Plot ==
Torcuato Ferreyra is a veteran of the Spanish Civil War who managed to amass a great fortune in Argentina after betraying his best friend, Bruno Salvat. At the end of the 30s, Bruno arrives in Argentina, in order to avenge Torcuato's treachery and rescue his sister Julia, who fell into the clutches of a pimp. Bruno gets asylum in a typical conventillo in Buenos Aires and from there he begins to plot his revenge plan.

However, while plotting his plan, Bruno falls madly in love with Lucía Morel, the young and beautiful fiancée of Torcuato Ferreyra. Lucía is an intelligent, feminist and sensitive young woman who only agrees to marry Torcuato at the insistence of her vile mother to get money for the operation of her father, who is sick with tuberculosis. Meanwhile, Aldo, a good-hearted hustler who is dedicated to convincing Spanish immigrants to embark towards Argentina under the pretext of being the land of opportunities, will do his best to rescue a young and beautiful Polish girl, Raquel, from the brothel where Julia is.

Other subplots of the telenovela include the romance between two young boys, Nino and Malek, the repressed homosexuality of Lucia's mother and the unrequited love of Alicia, Torcuato's sister, for Aldo.

== Cast ==
Actor	Character	Season		
Actor	Character	1 Part 1	1 Part 2	2
Benjamín Vicuña	Torcuato Ferreyra †	Main	Main	
Gonzalo Heredia	Aldo Lázaro Moretti †	Main	Main	Mencioned
María Eugenia Suárez	Raquel Novack Zimmerman	Main	Main	Stand-in
Albert Baró	Bruno Salvat	Main	Main	Photograph
Delfina Chaves	Lucía Morel Anchorena	Main	Main	Photograph
Fernán Mirás	Samuel Trauman †	Main	Main	Stand-in
Andrea Frigerio	"Madama Ivonne" / Olga Bertuzzi †	Main	Main	
Virginia Innocenti	Libertad Anchorena de Morel †	Main	Main	
Mercedes Funes	Alicia Ferreyra	Also Starring	Also Starring	
Julia Calvo	Serafina de Moretti †	Also Starring	Also Starring	
Candela Vetrano	Anna Moretti	Also Starring	Also Starring	
Malena Sánchez	Francesca Moretti	Also Starring	Also Starring	
Diego Domínguez	Manuel Córdoba	Also Starring	Also Starring	
Ruggero Pasquarelli	Víctor "Toro" de Leone †	Also Starring		
Matías Mayer	Edinson Gallo	Also Starring	Also Starring	
Federico Salles	Gabriel Celestino Morel Anchorena	Also Starring	Also Starring	
Gastón Cocchiarale	David Lowenstein	Also Starring	Also Starring	
Minerva Casero	Lidia Morel Anchorena	Also Starring	Also Starring	
Tomás Kirzner	Julián Salinas	Also Starring	Also Starring	
Fausto Bengoechea	Juan Carlos "Alambre" Galván †	Also Starring	Also Starring	
Joaquín Flamini	Nino †	Also Starring		
Franco Quercia	Malek Azadyan	Also Starring	Also Starring	
Ariel Pérez de María	Alí Azadyan †	Also Starring	Also Starring	
Juan M. Correa	Genaro †	Also Starring		
Luciano Cáceres	Julio Salaberry †	Also Starring	Also Starring	
Soledad Fandiño	Mercedes "Mecha" Podesta / Dora		Also Starring	
Maite Lanata	Carmen Trauman		Also Starring	

== Production ==
Production of the soap opera began on January 2, 2019, and ended on November 15, 2019. After "Padre Coraje", the telenovela is one of the most expensive productions of El Trece in recent years. A large part of the production takes place in the Baires Studios of Don Torcuato, for each episode filmed, 150 people were needed. The character of María Eugenia Suárez is based on the life of Rokhl Lea Liberman (better known as Raquel Liberman), a Polish woman born in the 20th century, who, like the character, suffered from abuse in Argentina. Unlike the soap opera, Ruchla Laja Liberman had 2 children and the character only has 4 siblings. Furthermore, the character of Fernán Mirás is based on Noé Trauman, the first president of the trafficking network Zwi Migdal.

=== Sequel ===
In 2021, the sequel to Argentina, tierra de amor y venganza was confirmed, which would be set in 1962. However, in 2022, due to the non-continuation of a large part of the original cast, it was announced that it will be set 50 years later in 1980. In March 2022, it was confirmed that the main cast would be made up of Gloria Carrá, Federico D'Elía, Juan Gil Navarro, Virginia Lago, Susana Giménez, Moria Casán, Justina Bustos, Ignacio Di Marco, Malena Solda, Santiago Talledo, Belén Chavanne, Toni Gelabert, Renato Quattordio, Federico Amador, Andrea Rincón, and the special participation of Darío Barassi. Filming is scheduled to start on May 9, 2022.

== Airing ==
The first season aired during 2019, from March 11 to December 30.

Separadas replaced it at the prime time in 2020, but it was cancelled amid the COVID-19 pandemic in Argentina. El Trece replaced it with reruns, and aired the first season of Argentina... again on June 22. It performed poorly against Telefe, that aired the Brazilian telenovela Jesus and a rerun of Educando a Nina.

=== Television rating ===
Viewership and ratings per season of Argentina, tierra de amor y venganza
Season	Episodes	First aired		Last aired		Avg. viewers (millions)	18–49 rank
Season	Episodes	Date	Viewers (millions)	Date	Viewers (millions)	Avg. viewers (millions)	18–49 rank
1	205	11 March 2019	13.7	30 December 2019	TBD	TBD	TBD
