= Mujeres asesinas (Argentine TV series) =

- Genre: Drama
- Based on: Mujeres asesinas by Marisa Grinstein
- Written by: Marisa Grinstein; Liliana Escliar; Walter Slavich; Marcelo Slavich; Marcos Carnevale; Daniel Romañach; Carlos Perrotti; Alejandro Alem
- Directed by: Daniel Barone; Jorge Nisco; Alberto Lecchi; Sebastián Pivotto; Marcos Carnevale; Martín Desalvo; Alejandro Ibáñez
- Country of origin: Argentina
- Original language: Spanish
- No. of seasons: 4
- No. of episodes: 78

Production
- Producer: Pol-Ka

Original release
- Network: El Trece
- Release: 19 July 2005 – 25 March 2008

Mujeres Asesinas (English: Killer Women) is a 2005 Argentine television series that blends elements of drama, psychological suspense, and crime thriller. It was inspired by a book by the same title by Marisa Grinstein describing the lives of 14 women who committed homicides in Argentina. The series was produced by Pol-ka Producciones and aired on the Argentine TV channel Canal 13 from July 19th, 2005, to March 25th, 2008.

Canal 13 rebroadcast those rated as "Best Episodes" at 23:00 from 4 January 2010.

== Plot ==
Mujeres Asesinas depicts the homicides committed by women in Argentina discussed in the trilogy of books of the same name by Marisa Grinstein. It has been the recipient of many awards, including the Golden Martin Fierro Award, the highest award granted by the Association of Journalists of Television and Radio Argentina, or APTRA. Each episode presents a dramatized account of real-life cases involving women who committed homicide, exploring the psychological, social, and emotional circumstances surrounding each crime. The series is notable for its anthology format, with each story featuring a different cast and narrative, allowing for a wide range of portrayals and interpretations of female violence.

Beyond its gripping storytelling, Mujeres Asesinas sparked public debate about gender, justice, and the representation of women in media. It also marked a turning poing in Argentine television by combining high production values with socially provocative themes, and by showcasting performances from many of the country's most acclaimed actresses.

== Episodes ==
=== First season ===
01	Eugenia Tobal	Marta Odera, monja (Marta Odera, nun).
02	Juana Viale	Ana D., mujer corrosiva (Ana D., corrosive woman).
03	Dolores Fonzi	Claudia Sobrero, cuchillera (Claudia Sobrero, cutler).
04	Julieta Díaz	Ana María Gómez Tejerina, asesina obstinada (Ana María Gómez Tejerina, obstinate killer).
05	Cristina Banegas	Emilia Basil, cocinera (Emilia Basil, cook).
06	Cecilia Roth	Clara, la fantasiosa (Clara, the fantasist).
07	Betiana Blum	Ana María Soba, heredera impaciente (Ana María Soba, impatient heiress).
08	Mercedes Morán	Graciela Hammer, incendiaria (Graciela Hammer, incendiary).
09	Araceli González	Margarita Herlein, probadora de hombres (Margarita Herlein, man tester).
10	Ana María Picchio	Stella O., huérfana emocional (Stella O., emotional orphan).
11	Valeria Bertuccelli	Marta Bogado, madre (Marta Bogado, mother).
12	Cristina Banegas	Margarita, la maldita (Margarita, the wicked).
13	Andrea Bonelli y María Abadi	Laura E., encubridora (Laura E., concealer).
14	Julia Calvo, Edda Bustamante, Claudia Fontán y Alejandro Urpadilleta	Brujas incautas y falsa mujer (Incautious witches and false woman).
15	Paola Krum	Lisa, la soñadora (Lisa, the dreamer).
16	Romina Gaetani	Norah, amiga (Norah, friend).
17	Carola Reyna	Sandra, la gestora (Sandra, the managing).
18	Cecilia Roth	Cándida, esposa improvisada (Cándida, improvised wife).
19	Bárbara Lombardo	Patricia, vengadora (Patricia, avenger).
20	Leonor Manso	Ofelia, enamorada (Ofelia, in love).
21	Romina Ricci	Carmen, hija (Carmen, daughter).
22	María Leal	Cristina, rebelde (Cristina, rebel).
=== Second season ===
01	Nacha Guevara	Yiya Murano, envenenadora (Yiya Murano, poisoner).
02	Celeste Cid	Lucía, memoriosa (Lucía, mindful).
03	María Leal, Emilia Mazer y Gloria Carrá	Hermanas de sangre (Blood sisters).
04	Araceli González	Irma, la de los peces (Irma, that of the fish).
05	Andrea Pietra	Javiera, ingenua (Javiera, naive).
06	Cristina Banegas	Leonor, madrastra (Leonor, stepmother).
07	Nancy Dupláa	Laura, abandonada (Laura, abandoned).
08	Leticia Brédice	Susana, dueña de casa (Susana, woman in charge).
09	Romina Gaetani	Laura, madre amante (Laura, loving mother).
10	Cristina Banegas	Elvira, madre abnegada (Elvira, selfless mother).
11	Vera Fogwill	Gloria, despiadada (Gloria, merciless).
12	Julieta Díaz	Felisa, desesperada (Felisa, desperate).
13	María Valenzuela	Isabel, enfermera (Isabel, nurse).
14	María Socas	Ana, sometida (Ana, submitted).
15	Leonor Manso	Ema, costurera (Ema, seamstress).
16	Romina Ricci	Cecilia, hermana (Cecilia, sister).
17	Emilia Mazer	María, creyente (María, believer).
18	Bárbara Lombardo	Mercedes, virgen (Mercedes, virgin).
19	Romina Ricci	Andrea, bailantera (Andrea, suburb dancer).
20	Andrea Pietra	Carmen, honrada (Carmen, honored).
21	María Valenzuela	Blanca, operaria (Blanca, operative).
22	Leonor Manso	Elena, protectora (Elena, protective).
23	Celeste Cid	Ramona, justiciera (Ramona, righteous).
24	Bárbara Lombardo	Sandra, confundida (Sandra, confused).
25	Leticia Brédice	Eliana, cuñada (Eliana, sister-in-law).
26	Manuela Pal	Soledad, cautiva (Soledad, captive).
27	Andrea Pietra	Olga, encargada (Olga, responsible).
28	Agustina Cherri	Sofía, nena de papá (Sofía, daddy's girl).
29	Malena Solda	Mónica, acorralada (Mónica, cornered)
30	Ana María Orozco	Mara, alucinada (Mara, hallucinatory).
31	Eleonora Wexler	Rosa, soltera (Rosa, single).
32	Laura Novoa	Nélida, tóxica (Nélida, toxic).
33	Emilia Mazer	Silvia, celosa (Silvia, jealous).
34	Virginia Innocenti	Próspera, arrepentida (Próspera, sorry).
35	Leonor Manso	Pilar, esposa (Pilar, wife).
36	Jazmín Stuart	Paula, bailarina (Paula, dancer).
37	Andrea Bonelli	Leticia, codiciosa (Leticia, greedy).
=== Third season ===
01	Gabriela Toscano	Rita, burlada (Rita, mocked).
02	Cristina Banegas	Milagros, pastora (Milagros, pastor).
03	Romina Gaetani	Nora, ultrajada (Nora, outraged).
04	Araceli González	Blanca, perdida (Blanca, lost).
05	Andrea del Boca	Sonia, desalmada (Sonia, heartless).
06	Laura Novoa	Claudia, herida (Claudia, wounded).
07	Leticia Brédice	Perla, anfitriona (Perla, hostess).
=== Fourth season ===
01	Romina Ricci	Dolores, poseída (Dolores, possessed).
02	Ana María Picchio	Thelma, impaciente (Thelma, impatient).
03	Juana Viale	Marta, manipuladora (Marta, manipulator).
04	Dolores Fonzi	Marcela, lastimada (Marcela, hurt).
05	Belén Blanco	Azucena, vengadora (Azucena, avenger).
06	Rita Cortese	Alicia, deudora (Alicia, debtor).
07	Mirta Busnelli	Juana, instigadora (Juana, instigator).
08	Julieta Ortega	Marga, víctima (Marga, victim).
09	Carola Reyna	Nina, desconfiada (Nina, distrustful).
10	María Abadi	Carolina, humillada (Carolina, humiliated).
11	María Onetto	Noemí, desquiciada (Noemí, deranged).
12	Valentina Bassi	Lorena, maternal (Lorena, motherly).

== Cast ==
The following is a list of actresses who have made the role of killer in the series:

- Eugenia Tobal
- Juana Viale
- Dolores Fonzi
- Julieta Díaz
- Cristina Banegas
- Cecilia Roth
- Betiana Blum
- Mercedes Morán
- Araceli González
- Ana María Picchio
- Valeria Bertuccelli
- Nahuel Pérez Biscayart
- Andrea Bonelli
- Claudia Fontán
- Julia Calvo
- Edda Bustamante
- Paola Krum
- Romina Gaetani
- Carola Reyna
- Bárbara Lombardo
- Leonor Manso
- Romina Ricci
- María Leal
- Nacha Guevara
- Celeste Cid
- Emilia Mazer
- Gloria Carrá
- Andrea Pietra
- Nancy Dupláa
- Leticia Brédice
- Vera Fogwill
- María Valenzuela
- María Socas
- Manuela Pal
- Agustina Cherri
- Malena Solda
- Ana María Orozco
- Eleonora Wexler
- Laura Novoa
- Virginia Innocenti
- Jazmín Stuart
- Gabriela Toscano
- Andrea del Boca
- Belén Blanco
- Rita Cortese
- Mirta Busnelli
- Julieta Ortega
- María Abadi
- María Onetto
- Valentina Bassi

== Martín Fierro Awards ==
- Martín Fierro Awards
- Best Unit/ Miniseries 2005 - Winner
- Best Unit / Miniseries 2006 - Nominated
- Best Unit / Miniseries 2007 - Nominated
- Best actress of Unit / Miniseries 2005 - (Inés Estévez) Winner
- Best actress of Unit / Miniseries 2006 - (Cristina Banegas) Winner
- Best actress of Unit / Miniseries 2007 - (Cristina Banegas) Winner

== See also ==
- Mujeres asesinas (2008 TV series)
- Mujeres asesinas (2022 TV series)
