= La casa del mar =

- Genre: Drama; Thriller
- Created by: Juan Pablo Laplace
- Directed by: Juan Pablo Laplace
- Starring: Gloria Carrá; Federico D'Elía; Darío Grandinetti; Juan Gil Navarro
- Country of origin: Argentina
- Original language: Spanish
- No. of seasons: 1
- No. of episodes: 4

Original release
- Network: OnDirecTV
- Release: 4 May – 27 June 2015

La casa del mar is a 2015 Argentine television series created and directed by Juan Pablo Laplace. Co-produced by Cisne Films, founded by Laplace and Rocío Scenna, the series was nominated for an International Emmy for Best Drama, and five Tato Awards including best fiction program, actress and cinematography.

== Cast ==
- Gloria Carrá ... (4 episodes, 2015)
- Federico D'Elía ... (4 episodes, 2015)
- Darío Grandinetti ... (4 episodes, 2015)
- Juan Gil Navarro ... (4 episodes, 2015)
- Antonio Birabent ... (3 episodes, 2015)
- Delfina Chaves ... (3 episodes, 2015)
- Tomás Fonzi ... (3 episodes, 2015)
- Agustín Pardella ... (3 episodes, 2015)
- Salo Pasik ... (3 episodes, 2015)
- Micaela Vázquez ... (3 episodes, 2015)

== Awards ==
Year	Award	Category	Result
2016	44th International Emmy Awards	Best Drama Series	Nominated
