= Delfina Chaves =

Argentine actress (born 1996)

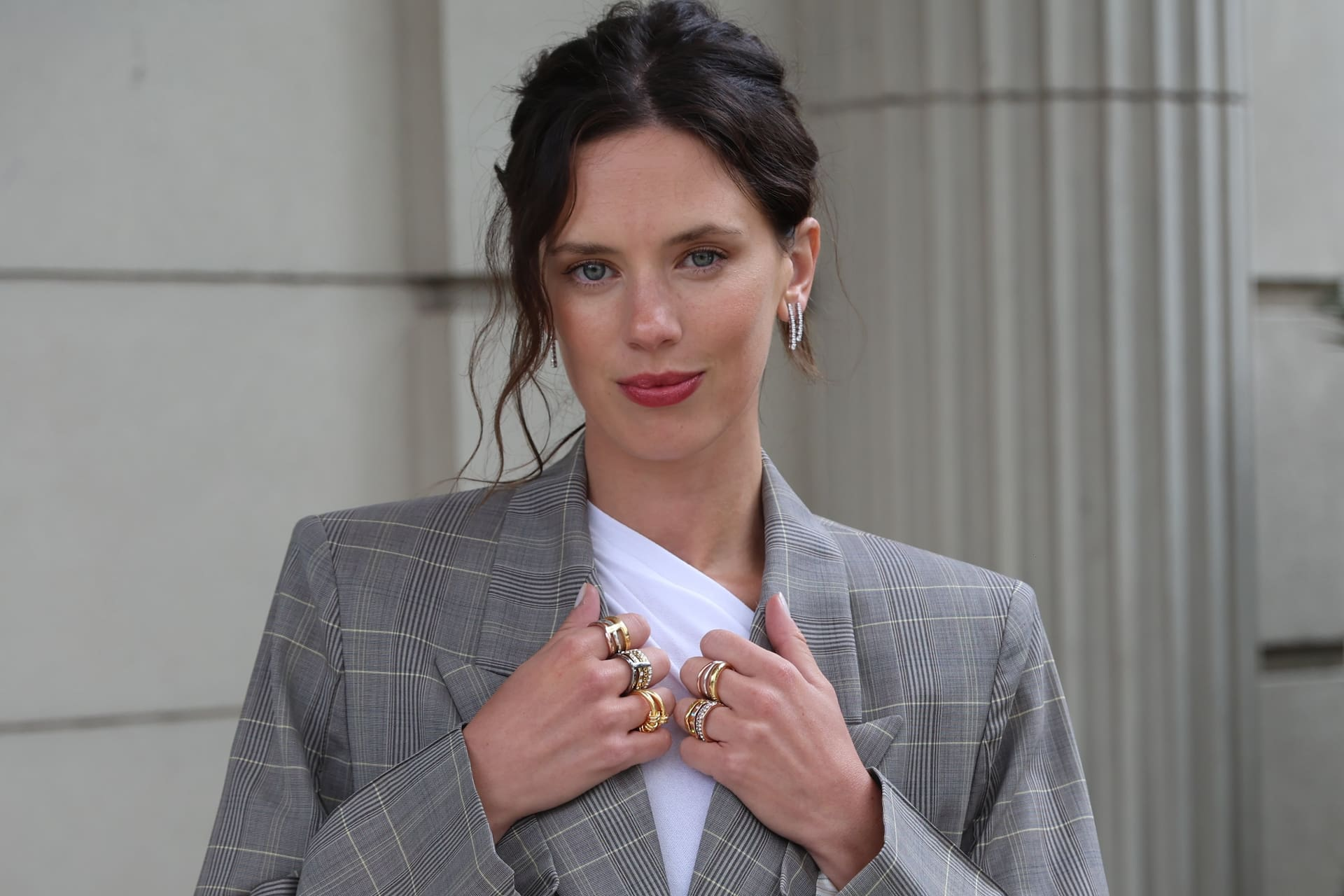
- Delfina Chaves in 2025
- Born: February 19, 1996 (age 30); Lobos, Argentina
- Occupation: Actress
- Years active: 2012 - present

Delfina Chaves (born 19 February 1996) is an Argentine actress and model. She is internationally best known for her role as Queen Máxima of the Netherlands in the TV series Máxima.

== Early life ==
Chaves was born in Lobos, Argentina on 19 February 1996 to architect Miguel Chaves and actress Alejandra Schulz. Her older sister Paula Chaves is also an actress. Chaves studied acting, dancing and singing while in high school.

== Career ==
Chaves started her acting career at age 16, in 2012, in the sitcom Concubinos (cohabitants) on Argentine television network El Trece. A year later she made her theater debut in the play Viaje de Locura (Crazy Trip).

In 2018 Chaves played the role of Elena Abadi in the Argentine Netflix-series Edha. She received accolades for her role as Lucia Morel in th Argentine historical drama Argentina, tierra de amor y venganza.

In 2022 Chaves played Manuela in the Mexican Netflix-series El secreto de la familia Greco. She had her international breakthrough role in 2024 as Máxima Zorreguieta in the TV series Máxima. The second season started production in 2025.

== Filmography ==
=== Television ===
| Year | Title | Role | Notes |
|---|---|---|---|
| 2012 | Concubinos | Delfina | |
| 2015-16 | La Casa del Mar | Laura Ramos | |
| 2016 | La Leona | Sarah and Ruth Liberman | |
| 2017 | Amar después de amar | Mia Kaplan | |
| 2018 | Edha | Elena Abadi | |
| 2019 | Argentina, tierra de amor y venganza | Lucia Morel Anchorena | |
| 2021 | Victoria, psicòloga vengadora | Nadia B. | |
| 2021 | Dìas de gallos | Lucrecia Simoni | |
| 2022 | El secreto de la familia Greco | Manuela | |
| 2023 | Ringo, gloria y muerte | Dora Raffa | |
| 2024 | Máxima | Máxima Zorreguieta | |
| 2024 | Felices los 6 | Carolina Becker | |

=== Film ===
| Year | Title | Role | Direction |
|---|---|---|---|
| 2020 | La corazonada | Gloriana Márquez | Alejandro Montiel |

== Acting credits and awards ==
| Year | Award | Work | Category | Result |
|---|---|---|---|---|
| 2016 | Nuevas Miradas en la Television | La casa del mar | Best actress | Winner |
| 2019 | Premios Notirey | Argentina, tierra de amor y venganza | Best actress in fiction | Winner |
| 2019 | Produ Awards | Argentina, tierra de amor y venganza | Best new actress | Nominee |
