= Abzurdah =

- Theatrical release poster
- Directed by: Daniela Goggi
- Screenplay by: Alejandro Montiel; Daniela Goggi; Alberto Rojas Apel
- Based on: Abzurdah by Cielo Latini
- Produced by: Franco Vilche
- Starring: Eugenia China Suárez; Esteban Lamothe; Gloria Carrá; Rafael Spregelburd; Paula Kohan; Fernando Dente; Zoe Hochbaum
- Cinematography: Sol Lopatín
- Edited by: Alberto Ponce
- Music by: Juan Blas Caballero
- Production companies: MyS Producción; HC Films; Telefe; Control Media; Stadium; Fénix Contenidos Audiovisuales
- Distributed by: Buena Vista International
- Release date: 4 June 2015 (Argentina)
- Running time: 90 minutes
- Country: Argentina
- Language: Spanish
- Box office: $5 million

Abzurdah is a 2015 Argentine biographical romantic drama film directed by Daniela Goggi, based on the autobiographical novel of the same name by Cielo Latini. The film stars Eugenia China Suárez and Esteban Lamothe.

== Premise ==
Cielo is a teenage student from the city of La Plata who meets Alejo, a man ten years older than her, a native of Avellaneda, with whom she begins a relationship and falls madly in love. Submerged in a superficial environment, without friends and in an adult world that understands little of the adolescent universe, the relationship becomes an obsession for Cielo, a loquacious, incisive and dizzying narrator, who leads us through a history of unrequited love where the option to stop eating becomes the illusion of a perfect life. But then, it shows how Cielo managed to heal and find happiness.

== Cast ==
- Eugenia China Suárez as Cielo Latini
- Esteban Lamothe as Alejo
- Gloria Carrá as Miriam
- Rafael Spregelburd as Eduardo
- Paula Kohan as Romina
- Tomás Ottaviano as Federico
- Malena Sánchez as Pilar
- Veggari as Camila
- Fernando Dente as Lucas
- Zoe Hochbaum as Hary

== Reception ==
=== Critical response ===
Abzurdah received mixed reviews from specialized critics. Javier Porta Fouz from the newspaper La Nación said in his review of the film: "We are dealing with a character that exists, which is clearly, that is imposed in situations that intensify but do not end up putting together a story with tension or with special fluency." In addition, Juan Pablo Cinelli of the newspaper Página 12 said, "A film that can be compared to a handful of sand: blunt, rough and abundant at the beginning, but as the story progresses it can not avoid slipping slowly between the fingers." On the other hand, Horacio Bilbao of the Clarín newspaper adds, "The promissory debut of China Suárez [...] and the rarefied love story that accentuates its crisis, allows Daniela Goggi (fundamental to direct a woman) to escape of the calculation of marketing."

More generally, Ezequiel Boetti from the Other Cinema site said: "It is true that cinema is not a question of intentions but of concrete results in the form of images and sounds captured on the screen, but it is impossible to approach Abzurdah without thinking that could have been a much better movie than it finally is."

=== Box office ===
The film in Argentina was an absolute success at the box office. The day of its premiere was seen by more than 30,000 spectators on 122 screens. Just a week after its premiere, it was seen by more than 240,000 spectators, being first in the national box office and becoming the best national opening of the first semester of 2015. At the moment, the film has been seen by more than 784,717 people.

== Home video ==
The film was released on home video on 28 October 2015 in Argentina. It was edited by SP Films and distributed by Blu Shine SRL. Its special features include Spanish 5.1 audio, wide-screen screen, subtitles in English and Spanish and region 1 and 4. The DVD includes as extras the teaser, the trailer, the film's video clip and making-of.

In February 2017, always in his native country, Transeuropa reissued and released the film with the same characteristics of the previous DVD, except that it does not include the teaser as an extra.
