= Máxima (TV series) =

- Genre: Biographical drama
- Based on: Máxima Zorreguieta: Motherland by Marcia Luyten
- Starring: Delfina Chaves; Martijn Lakemeier; Sebastian Koch; Elsie de Brauw; Daniel Freire
- Country of origin: Netherlands
- Original languages: Spanish; Dutch; English; German
- No. of seasons: 2
- No. of episodes: 12

Production
- Producer: Rachel van Bommel
- Cinematography: Daan Nieuwenhuijs
- Editor: Jurriaan Van Nimwegen
- Running time: 40–50 minutes
- Production companies: Videoland; Millstreet Films; FBO

Original release
- Network: Videoland
- Release: April 20, 2024 – present

Máxima is a Dutch biographical television series developed by Videoland and based on the 2022 novel Máxima Zorreguieta: Motherland by author Marcia Luyten. The series revolves around the early life of Queen Máxima of the Netherlands and the beginnings of her relationship with Willem-Alexander. It premiered in the Netherlands on 20 April 2024 with six episodes, and in Spain on Antena 3 on 19 June 2024. It premiered in Latin America on 15 August 2024 on Max. A second season was released in March and April 2026. A spin-off series focusing on Princesses Mabel and Margarita is currently in development.

== Premise ==
The series revolves around the life of Máxima Zorreguieta when she meets Willem-Alexander, the Prince of Orange during the Seville Fair in Spain in 1999. The plot is intersected with flashbacks that portray her childhood, adolescence and young adulthood, showing her life in Argentina during the National Reorganization Process, her university years and her work as an economist in New York.

== Cast ==
=== Main ===
- Delfina Chaves as Máxima Zorreguieta
  - Olivia Monaco as young girl Máxima
  - Candela Saitta as teenage Máxima
- Martijn Lakemeier as Willem-Alexander, The Prince of Orange
- Elsie de Brauw as Queen Beatrix
- Sebastian Koch as Prince Claus
- Daniel Freire as Jorge Zorreguieta, Máxima's father, who served in the government of Argentine dictator Jorge Rafael Videla.
- Valeria Alonso as María del Carmen Cerruti, Máxima's mother

=== Recurring ===
- Jacob Derwig as Thomas Wagenaar, Maxima's advisor
- Iván Lapadula como Tiziano Iachetti, Maxima's boyfriend in her youth
- Cecilia Cereijido-Bloche as Dolores Zorreguieta, Máxima's half-sister
- Gala Bichir as Inés Zorreguieta, Máxima's sister
- Santiago Botto as young adult Martín Zorreguieta, Máxima's brother
- Paula Gala as Cynthia Kaufmann, Máxima's friend from school whom she meets again in New York
- Agustina Palma as Valeria Delger, Máxima's friend from school
- Ivette Balaguer as Ana Laffont, Máxima's acquaintance who introduces her to Willem-Alexander
- Sébastien Corona as Philippe Laffont, Ana's husband
- Kees Hulst as Max van der Stoel, Dutch diplomat who criticizes Máxima
- Jaap Spijkers as Wim Kok, Dutch Prime Minister

== Production ==
=== Development ===
The series was announced in February 2022, after the Dutch platform Videoland acquired the rights to the book Moederland: De jonge jaren van Máxima Zorreguieta by Marcia Luyten (nl). Initially it had been announced that the script would be written by Dorien Goertzen and Karin van der Meer, and that Anne de Clercq would be the director. However, in March 2023 it was announced that the books would be written by Marnie Blok and Ilse Ott, while the direction would be under the responsibility of Saskia Diesing, Joosje Duk and Iván López Núñez. It was also confirmed that the series would be made up of 6 episodes of 40–50 minutes each.

The series was produced by the Dutch studio Millstreet Films, and in July 2023, it was reported that it partnered with Beta Film for the international distribution and sale of the series.

=== Casting ===
In December 2022, Argentine actress Delfina Chaves was cast to play the role of Máxima Zorreguieta, while Dutch actor Martijn Lakemeier was announced as in the role of Prince Willem-Alexander in March 2023.

=== Filming ===
Filming of the series began in July 2023. It took place on locations in the United States, Spain, Belgium and the Netherlands. The Buenos Aires sequences were filmed in Madrid, on Gran Vía and the Instituto Cervantes.
