= Gonzalo Otalora =

Argentine writer

Gonzalo Otalora is an Argentine television producer and bestselling author. He is particularly notable for his book ¡Feo! (Ugly!), which deals with public policy responses to inequities in personal appearance and attractiveness. In 2013, he produced the TV miniseries Santos y pecadores.

Motivated by his personal history, he wrote ¡Feo! in 2007, which is a bestseller in Argentina and in which he argued that, given recent research that physical attractiveness is an economic advantage, the tax system should be reformed to tax those who benefit and subsidise those who do not.
