= Albert Baró =

Spanish actor (born 1996)

- Born: 29 April 1996 (age 29) or 24 September 1996 (age 29); Sant Esteve de Palautordera, Catalonia, Spain
- Occupation: Actor
- Years active: 2008–present

Albert Baró (born 29 April or 24 September 1996) is a Spanish actor, best known for having starred in the film The Wild Ones, and the series Merlí and Argentina, tierra de amor y venganza.

== Career ==
Coming from a family with tradition in the theater, he trained in Horitzó Teatre de Sant Esteve de Palautordera, with which he has made several theatrical productions such as Los Pastorets, Abrazo-Sant Esteve Tsunami and Grease. With twelve years he obtained his first professional work performing in Johan during the ninth and part of the tenth season of the series, El Cor de la Ciutat. In 2009, he participated in the television version of Les veus del Pamano, a novel by Jaume Cabré. In 2012, he debuted on the big screen playing Gabi, one of the protagonists of The Wild Ones and in 2014 he appeared in Asmodexia, by director Marc Carreté. On the other hand, in the theater he has participated in the play Els nostres tigres beuen llet by Albert Espinosa, which was performed at the National Theatre of Catalonia.

In 2015, he joined the cast of the Merlí series. He appeared in the video clip of "The Less I Know the Better" by the Australian group Tame Impala. Between 2015 and 2016, he conducted an interpretation course at Laura Jou School and participated in the play, Citizenship, which premiered in March in Barcelona, Spain. During 2018, he participated in the Televisión Española series Servir y proteger. In 2019 he played Bruno, a Catalan fleeing the Civil War in El Trece telenovela Argentina, tierra de amor y venganza.

== Filmography ==
Film roles
| Year | Title | Roles | Notes |
|---|---|---|---|
| 2012 | The Wild Ones | Gabi | |
| 2014 | Asmodexia | Jan | |
| 2015 | El primer día | Albert | Short film |
| 2017 | Sol creixent | David | Short film |
| 2017 | Insidia | Silo | Short film |
| 2018 | The Laws of Thermodynamics | Alumno 2 | |

Television roles
| Year | Title | Roles | Notes |
|---|---|---|---|
| 2009 | Les veus del Pamano | Jaumet | 2 episodes |
| 2008–2009 | El Cor de la Ciutat | Johan | 12 episodes |
| 2015–2018 | Merlí | Joan Capdevila | Series regular (seasons 1–3); 40 episodes |
| 2018 | Servir y proteger | David Merino | Series regular; 58 episodes |
| 2019 | Argentina, tierra de amor y venganza | Bruno Salvat | Main role; 205 episodes |
| 2020 | Adentro | Iñaki | |
| 2021 | Yrreal | Raúl | |
| 2022–2023 | Welcome to Eden | Aldo | 4 episodes |
