= Cielo Latini =

Argentine writer (born 1984)

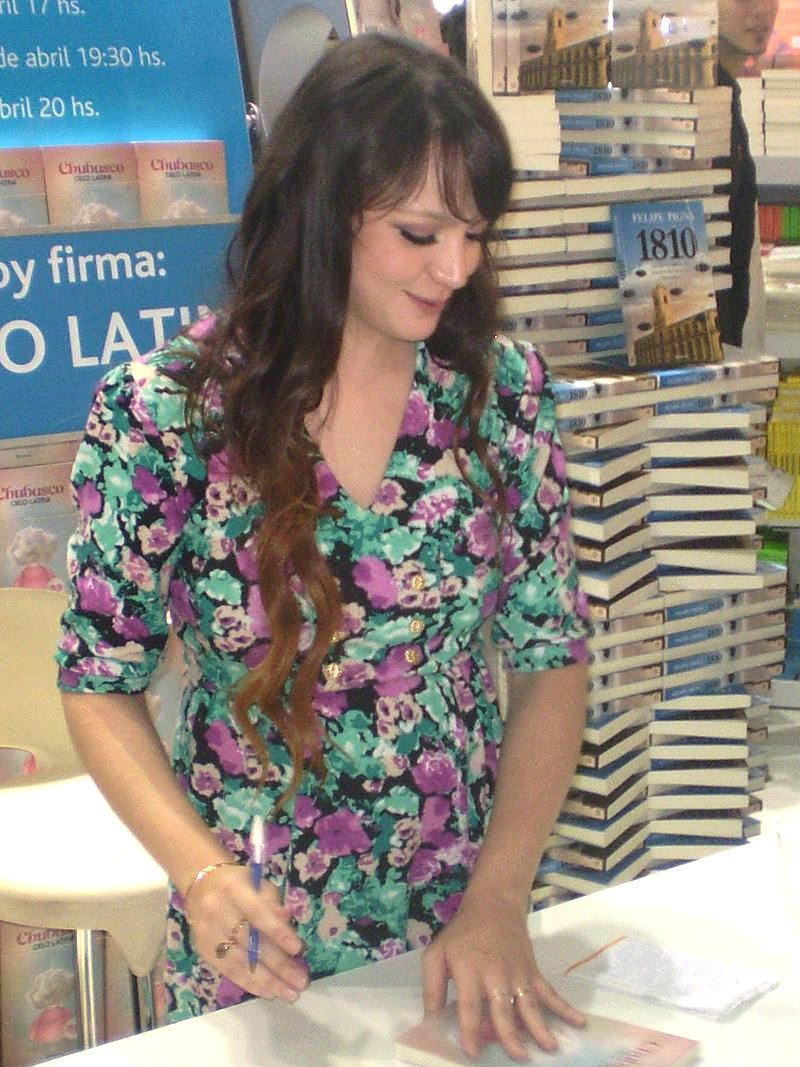
- Cielo Latini at the Buenos Aires International Book Fair
- Born: June 14, 1984 (age 42); La Plata, Argentina
- Occupation: Writer
- Spouse: Rolando Graña (m. 2010; div. 2013)
- Children: 2
- Writing career
- Language: Spanish
- Genre: Autobiography
- Notable work: Abzurdah

Cielo Latini (born 14 June 1984) is an Argentine writer. As a teenager, she wrote Abzurdah, an autobiography that detailed her problems with anorexia and bulimia. The book was a success and got a film adaptation in 2015 starring María Eugenia Suárez.

== Biography ==
Cielo Latini was born on 14 June 1984, in La Plata, Argentina. She started and dropped her study of journalism at the Pontifical Catholic University of Argentina. She fell in love with Alejandro, who was 10 years older than her. She developed anorexia and bulimia in her attempts to improve her physical image, and started a web page, "Me como a mí", encouraging other girls to embrace those disorders. She tried to commit suicide when Alejandro left her, but she was saved. She started rehabilitation, and eventually started dating again.

She came up with the idea of writing about her eating disorders and her relationship with Alejandro, writing her autobiography, Abzurdah, at the age of 20. The book was a huge success and she was interviewed on radio and TV, including Almorzando con Mirtha Legrand. During those interviews she met the journalist Rolando Graña and they fell in love, despite having a 25-year age gap. They had two daughters and later separated.

Latini wrote a second book, Chubasco, based on the story of a friend. This book was also a success, and she received proposals to make film adaptations of it.

She sold the rights for a film adaptation of Abzurdah in 2006, after the release and success of the book. The film was not made, and the rights returned to her five years later. She sold them again, and then the book was adapted into an eponymous film in 2015, starring María Eugenia Suárez, as Latini. The film was made a decade after the release of the book, and Latini was not involved with the production. She first saw it in a private show. She praised the work of the actors and directors and observed that the book had a greater focus on eating disorders than the film.

Latini's third book, Adiós, was released in 2019.

== Books ==
- Abzurdah (2006)
- Chubasco (2010)
- Adiós (2019)
