= The Heavy Hand of the Law =

2017 Argentine legal drama film

- Theatrical release poster
- Spanish: El peso de la ley
- Directed by: Fernán Mirás
- Screenplay by: Roberto Gispert; Fernán Mirás
- Produced by: Fernando Sokolowicz
- Starring: Paola Barrientos; Darío Grandinetti; María Onetto; Fernán Mirás; Jorgelina Aruzzi; Darío Barassi
- Cinematography: Mariana Russo, ADF
- Edited by: Anabela Latanzio, EDA
- Music by: Johann Sebastian Bach played by Cecilia Pugliese
- Production companies: Arco Libre; Mirás/Gispert; Aleph Media
- Distributed by: Primer Plano Film Group
- Release date: 23 March 2017
- Running time: 101 minutes
- Country: Argentina
- Language: Spanish
- Box office: $114,080

The Heavy Hand of the Law is a 2017 Argentine legal drama film directed by Fernán Mirás from a screenplay he co-wrote with Roberto Gispert. Produced by Fernando Sokolowicz, the film stars Paola Barrientos as Gloria Soriano, a public defender disillusioned with her work for never having defended an innocent when she gets involved in a legal case regarding a rape in El Escondido, a fictitious town located in the deep interior of Buenos Aires with a pleading written by her former teacher and aspiring to a seat in the Argentine Judiciary, Prosecutor Mercedes Rivas (María Onetto).

== Plot ==
Law student Gloria Soriano is taking a final oral exam to graduate as an attorney to her teacher, Attorney Rivas. Rivas asks Soriano three things, the definition of justice, if Soriano would defend someone she considers guilty and if she would defend someone with no money. Soriano approves and in the middle of the celebration she goes through a broken elevator door and falls to the void, getting crippled. Years later, in 1983 on a rural town; two public cleaners, "Gringo" Gómez and Manfredo Doméstico are taking litter out of a bridge. Then they go to the populated local bar, where the light is cut off, moment in which they leave to have sex. The next day, Néstor Fabián, Manfredo's brother, takes him to the local police station in order to fill a complaint against "Gringo" Gómez for rape of a mentally disable person, during the walk he reveals he plans to sue him in order to take his house, since both Néstor and Manfredo are homeless, living in an intermodal container. Néstor hits Manfredo for opposing the denouncement, leaving him with a black eye. The police officer queries about Manfredo's wound, Néstor replies that the Gringo did it. The police officers takes Manfredo to the crime scene and ask him to pose in the position he was supposedly raped and took pictures of him. Later, Betty, Gómez's wife, finds out about the accusation and Gomez is taken to the police station, where he is made to sign a confession despite the fact that he is illiterate. Meanwhile, the police takes pictures of the five witnesses at the bar in the night of the crime.

Since Rivas is making lobby to make it to judge in the amidst of the Argentine transition to democracy, the case file is written by Rivas' assistant and signed by her and later sent to Soriano's desk, where it is received by Secretary Santi. When Soriano reads the file, she founds no proof at all of Manfredo's supposedly mental disabilities or evidence of a rape and is angered by the fact that the pleading only has two pages. She then asks the psychologist of the nearest town to make a new examination of Manfredo. When the psychologist arrives, she makes an examination of Manfredo using kinetic family drawing, diagnosing him as mentally impaired, since he did not completed the test, he later cries about the situation. Soriano decides to visit Gómez and makes him read the confession he signed and confesses he cannot, since he does not know how to read and that he does not even knows why he is in jail. Later, Soriano goes to a clothes store and finds out Ferrera, the judge of the case, is gay. In El Escondido, Betty is talking with the commissary about how Gringo's house actually is on a usurious mortgage with him and that, if the Gringo can not pay, the commissary keeps the house. Soriano goes to the provincial courts to talk with Rivas, only to find out she lost every bit of empathy about her job. Soriano returns to her desk and talks with Santi about her disappointment with her work and, motivated by Rivas' dessidy, decides to go to El Escondido for a last try to clean Gómez's name. She meets a silent tramp who takes her to the chief deputy, mentions Néstor's criminal record and alcoholism and then he takes her to the town. She later confronts the local psychologist on her diagnosis. Meanwhile, the chief deputy calls Rivas about the arrival of Soriano to El Escondido. She asks him to prevent a key witness who is not revealed to the audience to talk with Soriano. The chief deputy ask her if there is a chance that Manfredo's brother was actually the one who caused Manfredo's black eye. Rivas asks him to not disclose this fact with anyone. Soriano goes to interrogate with four witness of the case and finds Betty, who now is in a relationship with the chief deputy and tells her she only married Gringo because his father had two horses and her father a plough. In her office, Rivas insults her assistant for the low effort he did on the pleading. After this talk with Betty, Soriano meets Mudo, who tells her that Manfredo it's who fixes the cars for him for the chief deputy.

In a meeting between Rivas and Ferrera, they discuss the news of the case and how she will dismiss Mudo as a witness because of his criminal record regarding stealing of motor vehicles parts and because he didn't said a word on his declaration. After Ferrera implies his support for Soriano, Rivas remembers him that he only made it to judge because of her contacts on the judicial family and pretending to be his girlfriend in order to fool the homophobic officials and that losing this minor case will truly affect her chances to become a judge. Then Santi tells her that el Mudo will be dismissed and that she lost the case. In the middle of her hopelessness, she sees Manfredo in the distance and pretends to have fallen. He helps her and tells him that the Gringo will be twelve years in jail thanks to his lack of action and gives him a business card. Santi visits Gringo in the prison unit, who tells him that he's being beaten by the other inmates and that even with solitary confinement, the guards left the door open in order to allow the beatings. Santi replies that he can't respond to any of the violence or he will be charged with more years of jail. Soriano, Ferrera and Rivas have a meeting where Soriano talks about Manfredo's mechanic skills, Gringo's house issue and Betty's adultery with the chief deputy. And finally says Rivas didn't made pleading and criticizes her decision to not fire the assistant. Back in El Escondido, Néstor is attacking Manfredo with a slingshot because of his reunion with Soriano as he insults him with homophobic epithets.

Soriano returns to her office, tired and expresses her discomfort with Santi about the uselessness of the four witnesses. Santi tells her that he won the lottery by betting 5-5-5, based on the amount of witnesses mentioned in the report of El Escondido's police, despite a missing page on it. After finding it, it turns out the missing witness it's the tramp that she met at the arrival to El Escondido. She goes to the town again and speaks with him, the tramp tells him that Manfredo was laughing and that he remembered it because it was the first time in his life that remembers Manfredo laughing. Manfredo takes the same bus that left Soriano in El Escondido and travels to the tribunals in Buenos Aires, where says his brother was the responsible of the wounds. Ferrera takes this as a sign of mental stability and declares Gómez innocent. Gomez returns to the town and finds out he has been kicked out of his house and that Betty now lives with the chief deputy. Néstor Fabián dies electrocuted thanks to a water leak after kicking Manfredo out of the house. The Gringo and Manfredo reunite again and hug each other. Santi congratulates Soriano and she decides to take a day off.

A written epilogue tells us that Rivas was named national judge twenty days after the absolution of The Gringo, that Manfredo Doméstico kept working in Escondido and died of pneumonia in 2007, The Gringo left Escondido and his whereabouts are unknown and Gloria Soriano worked for 30 years, became a teacher and that she is still single.

== Cast ==
- Paola Barrientos as Gloria Soriano, a public defender disillusioned with her work
- María Onetto as Mercedes "Mecha" Rivas, the prosecutor of the case
- Darío Grandinetti as Judge Ferrera, a member of the Argentine Judiciary
- Darío Barassi as Secretary Santi, the assistant of Gloria Soriano
- Fernán Mirás as Manfredo Doméstico, the victim in the case
- Daniel Lambertini as Carlos Maximiliano "Gringo" Gómez, the criminal of the case
- Pacha Rosso as Néstor Fabián Doméstico, the brother of the victim
- Jorgelina Aruzzi as Betty Gómez, the wife of "Gringo" Gómez
- Daniel La Rosa as the local chief deputy
- Andrés Zurita as Mudo, the mechanic

== Production ==
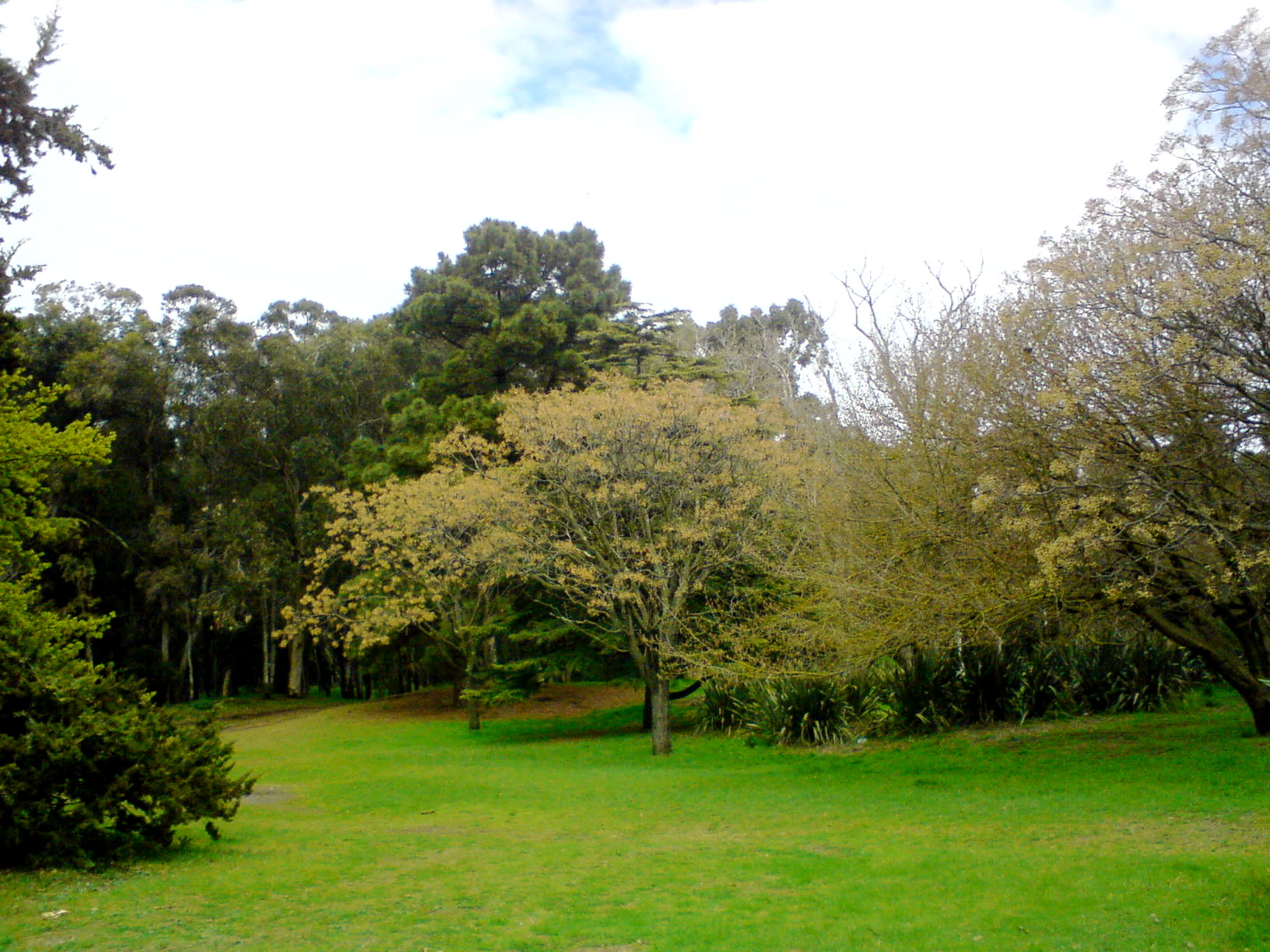
Miguel Lillo Park at Necochea, the forest in which the movie was filmed

The development of the film began when Roberto Gispert talk about the case in which this movie is inspired to Fernán Miras. When the crew began to interview people in the Judiciary, they found out that most people began to study law because "they were naive at the time". This led to focus the film on how the system not only destroys victims and criminals, but also the goodwill of its workers.

Once the screenplay writing was over, Gispert gave a copy of it to Fernando Sokolowicz from Aleph Media, who gave a greenlight six month later. Most of the pre-production took part in Mar del Plata, Gispert's hometown, where a casting with local actors was held in which Daniel Lambertini was cast as the Gringo. During an unrelated trip to Necochea, Mirás asked to the local Secretariat of Tourism about locations and they offered logistic support while shooting in the local forests. Mirás originally didn't planned to act in the movie, but Sokolowicz made him as a condition for the greenlight.

Principal photography began in October 2015 at Buenos Aires, Necochea and Mar del Plata, under the working title "La letra de la ley". While shooting in Necochea, the locals helped with the production via a WhatsApp group.

The post-production took place in Cinecolor Argentina with Mariana Russo, the film's cinematographer and Roberto Zambrino.

== Release ==
=== Theatrical ===
The movie premiered on March 23, 2017 on 24 screens under distribution of Primer Plano Film Group.

=== Home video ===
The movie was released in DVD on August 23, 2017 by Transeuropa under license of Primer Plano Film Group with English subtitles and extras.

== Reception ==
=== Box office ===
During its opening weekend, The Heavy Hand of the Law ranked 10th at the Argentine box office, selling 6,907 tickets, the best debut for an Argentine movie in less than 30 screens since Path to Peace. On its second weekend, ranked 13th, selling 4,931 tickets. On its third weekend of release, ranked 14th, selling 2,735 tickets. On its fourth weekend of release, ranked 16th, selling 2,340 tickets. On its fifth weekend of release, ranked 17th, selling 1,189 tickets. On its sixth weekend of release, ranked 18th, selling 1,150 tickets. And finally, on its seventh weekend, with the premiere in Rosario (Grandinetti's hometown), the film ranked 17th, with 1,634 tickets, an increase of a 42,09% compared to the previous weekend.

=== Critical response ===
The movie was well received by Argentine critics. Todas Las Críticas, an Argentine review aggregator website, reported a 79% approval rating with an average rating of 66/100 based on 29 reviews.

=== Accolades ===
Award	Date of ceremony	Category	Recipient(s) and nominee(s)	Result	Ref(s)
Premios Sur	26 September 2018	Best New Film	Fernán Mirás	Nominated	
Premios Sur	26 September 2018	Best Actress	Paola Barrientos	Nominated	
Premios Sur	26 September 2018	Best Actor	Fernán Mirás	Nominated	
Premios Sur	26 September 2018	Best Supporting Actress	María Onetto	Nominated	
Premios Sur	26 September 2018	Best New Actor	Darío Barassi	Nominated	
Premios Sur	26 September 2018	Best Sound	Javier Stravrópulos	Nominated	
