= Montecristo (Argentine TV series) =

2006 Argentine television series

- From left to right: Laura Sáenz (Paola Krum), Santiago Díaz Herrera (Pablo Echarri) and Marcos Lombardo (Joaquín Furriel)
- Also known as: Montecristo: Un Amor y Una Venganza
- Genre: Telenovela
- Directed by: Miguel Colom
- Starring: Pablo Echarri; Paola Krum
- Opening theme: "Yo soy aquél" by David Bolzoni
- Country of origin: Argentina
- Original language: Spanish
- No. of episodes: 145

Original release
- Network: Telefe
- Release: April 25 – December 27, 2006

Montecristo: Un Amor, Una Venganza (Monte Cristo: Love and Revenge) is an Argentine telenovela which premiered April 25, 2006 on Telefe. Loosely based on the 1844 Alexandre Dumas novel, The Count of Monte Cristo, Montecristo is Telefe's most popular novela and was called "the hottest telenovela in Argentina" by Variety in 2007.

Like Dumas' novel, the novela is a tale of revenge, with this version featuring "drug trafficking, kidnapping and military dictatorships." It was directed by Miguel Colom, and stars Pablo Echarri and Paola Krum.

== International sales and remakes ==
More than 40 international markets bought the Telefe-produced series in 2006, and later Telefe sold it to Albania, Bulgaria, Israel, North Macedonia, Serbia, the Philippines, and Ukraine. In addition, Chile, Mexico, Portugal, Russia, and Colombia's Caracol TV produced adaptations, and in February 2007 Telefe sold remake rights to Italy and Spain as well.

== Plot ==
The story begins in 1995 as Santiago Díaz Herrera is hurt while fencing with his best friend Marcos Lombardo. Marcos wants to bring Santiago back to Buenos Aires but his father, Alberto, commands him to leave Santiago in a Moroccan jail, and Santiago is declared dead. Eleven years pass, and in 2006 Santiago returns to Buenos Aires seeking revenge on the Lombardos for their crimes to himself, his father and other people who have stood in their way over the decades.

== Cast ==
- Pablo Echarri as Santiago Díaz Herrera
- Paola Krum as Laura Ledesma
- Joaquín Furriel as Marcos Lombardo
- Oscar Ferreiro as Alberto Lombardo
- Viviana Saccone as Victoria Sáenz
- Virginia Lago as Helena Luján
- Roberto Carnaghi as Lisandro Donosso
- Rita Cortese as Sarita Carusso
- María Onetto as Leticia Monserrat
- Luis Machín as León Rocamora
- Mónica Scapparone as Lola
- Celina Font as Milena Salcedo
- Esteban Pérez as Luciano Mazello
- Maximiliano Ghione as Ramón Ortega
- Horacio Roca as Padre Pedro
- Maria Abadi as Érica Donosso
- Milton de la Canal as Matías Lombardo
- Victoria Rauch as Valentina Lombardo
- Nora Cárpena as Mercedes Cortés

Other co-stars - Mario Pasik
