= Jeroen de Lange =

Dutch politician

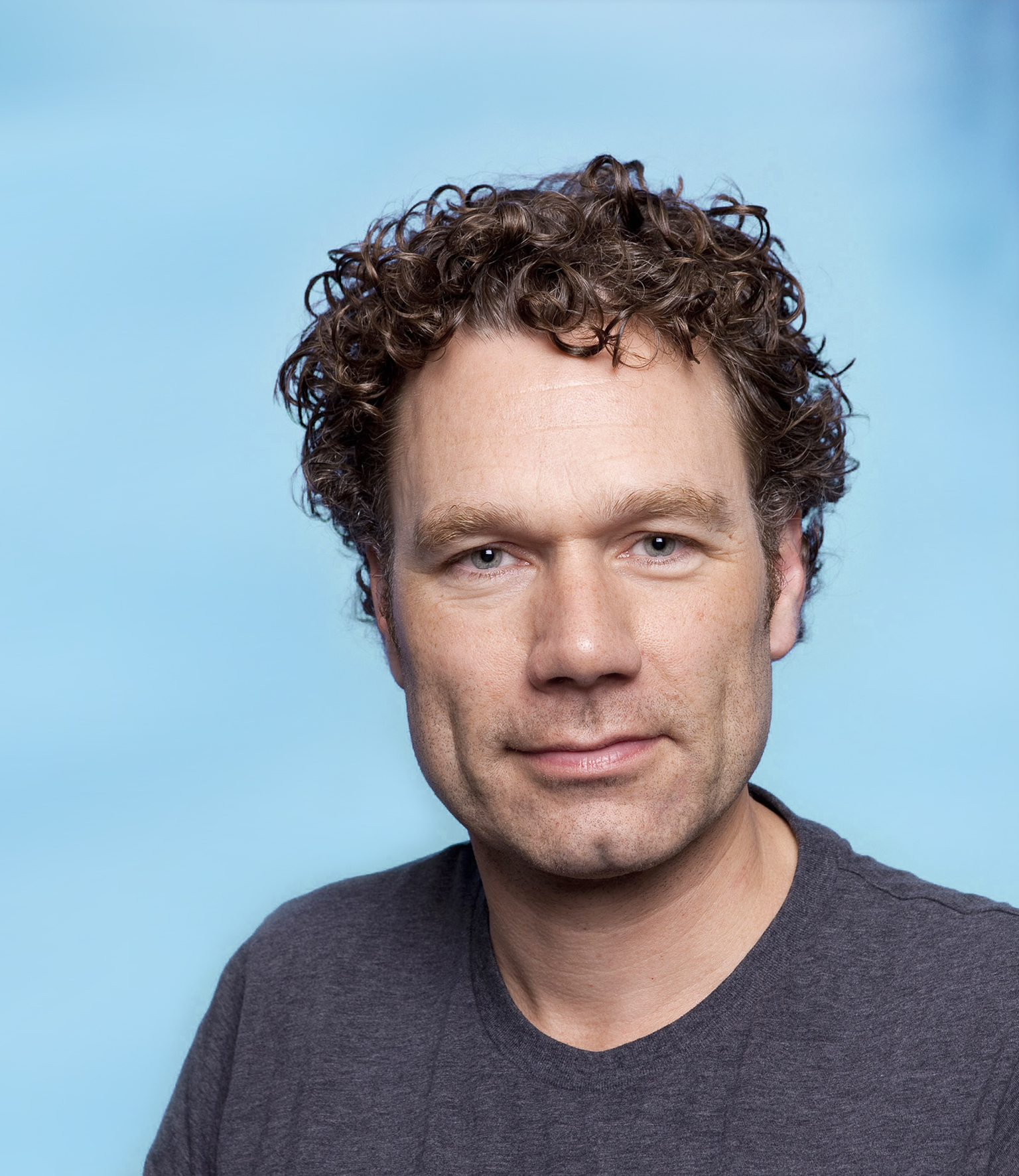
J. de Lange

Jeroen de Lange (born 7 November 1968, in Breda) is a former Dutch politician. Between 25 January 2012 and 19 September 2012, he served as a member of his country's House of Representatives, representing the Labour Party (Partij van de Arbeid). He focused on matters of development aid and trade policy.

Formerly he worked at the World Bank.

Jeroen de Lange is married to journalist and television presenter Marcia Luyten.
