= Marcia Luyten =

Dutch journalist (born 1971)

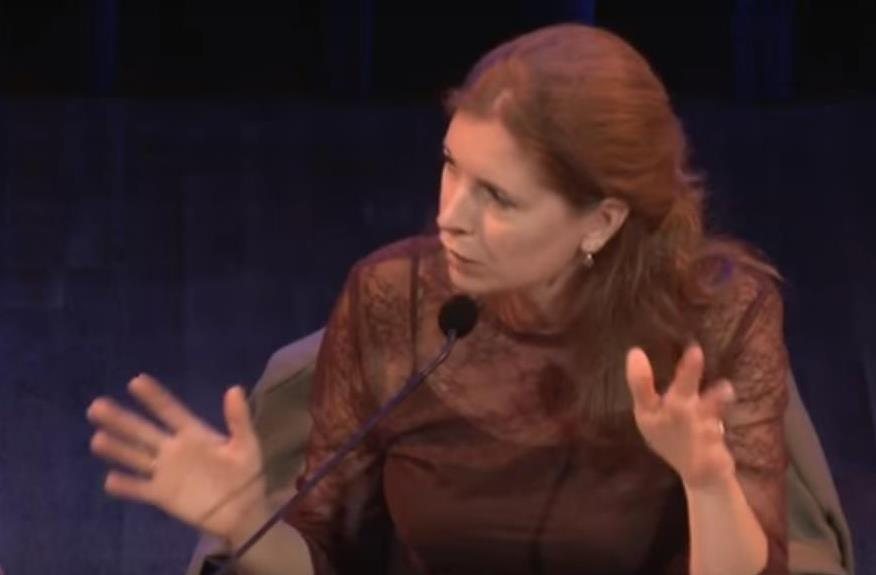
- Luyten in 2017
- Born: May 29, 1971 (age 54); Wijnandsrade, Limburg, the Netherlands
- Education: Business Administration, Cultural History, International Relations
- Alma mater: Maastricht University
- Occupation: Journalist

Marcia Luyten (29 May 1971) is a Dutch journalist and author. She was a presenter of Buitenhof, a television programme with political interviews. She published an unofficial biography of Queen Máxima of the Netherlands, that was used for the script of the Dutch TV-series Máxima.

== Early life and education ==
Luyten was born in Wijnandsrade and obtained degrees in Business Administration and Arts and Culture from the University of Maastricht. Next, she completed the diplomatic academy at the Netherlands Institute of International Relations Clingendael.

== Career ==
=== Journalist in Africa ===
Luyten started her career as correspondent for NRC Handelsblad and Volkskrant in Uganda and Rwanda between 1995 and 2001. After that, she had a two-year assignment as diplomat at the Ministry of Foreign Affairs in the Hague. From 2006 to 2010 she lived and worked as journalist in Kampala where her spouse, politician and diplomat Jeroen de Lange, was posted. In 2010 her husband´s contract was not renewed, according to Luyten because of her critical publications.

=== Television presenter and author ===
In 2012, Luyten became presenter for VPRO of Buitenhof, the television program for political interviews. In 2015 she published Het geluk van Limburg (Limburg´s Fortune or Limburg´s Happiness), a book about the history of coal mining in her native Limburg. For this book, Luyten was awarded the 2016 Busseprijs, the Dutch award for best journalism book of the year.

In 2021, Luyten published Máxima Zorreguieta: Moederland (Motherland), an unofficial biography about Queen Máxima of the Netherlands. The book was the basis for the television series Máxima, produced and distributed by Videoland. The book was translated in Spanish as Máxima Zorreguieta: Madre Patria and published by Emecé Argentina in 2022.

Luyten continues to publish in De Volkskrant. In 2023 she published a selection of her articles in the book Democratie is niet voor bange mensen (Democracy is not for the faint-hearted).

== Bibliography ==
Year	Title	Publisher
2013	Witte geef geld (Afrika) (Whitey give money (Africa))	Podium
2008	Ziende blind in de sauna (Wilfully blind in the sauna)	Lemniscaat
2013	Dag Afrika (Goodbye Africa)	De Bezige Bij
2015	Het Geluk van Limburg (Limburg´s Fortune)	De Bezige Bij
2018	Wit, niet blank. Mijn eerste jaren in Afrika (Pale, not white. My first years in Africa)	Podium
2021	Máxima Zorreguieta. Moederland (Máxima Zorreguieta. Motherland)	De Bezige Bij
2022	Máxima Zorreguieta: Madre Patria	Emecé
2023	Democratie is niet voor bange mensen (Democracy is not for the faint-hearted)	De Bezige Bij
