= Maruja Bustamante =

Argentinian actor, writer and director

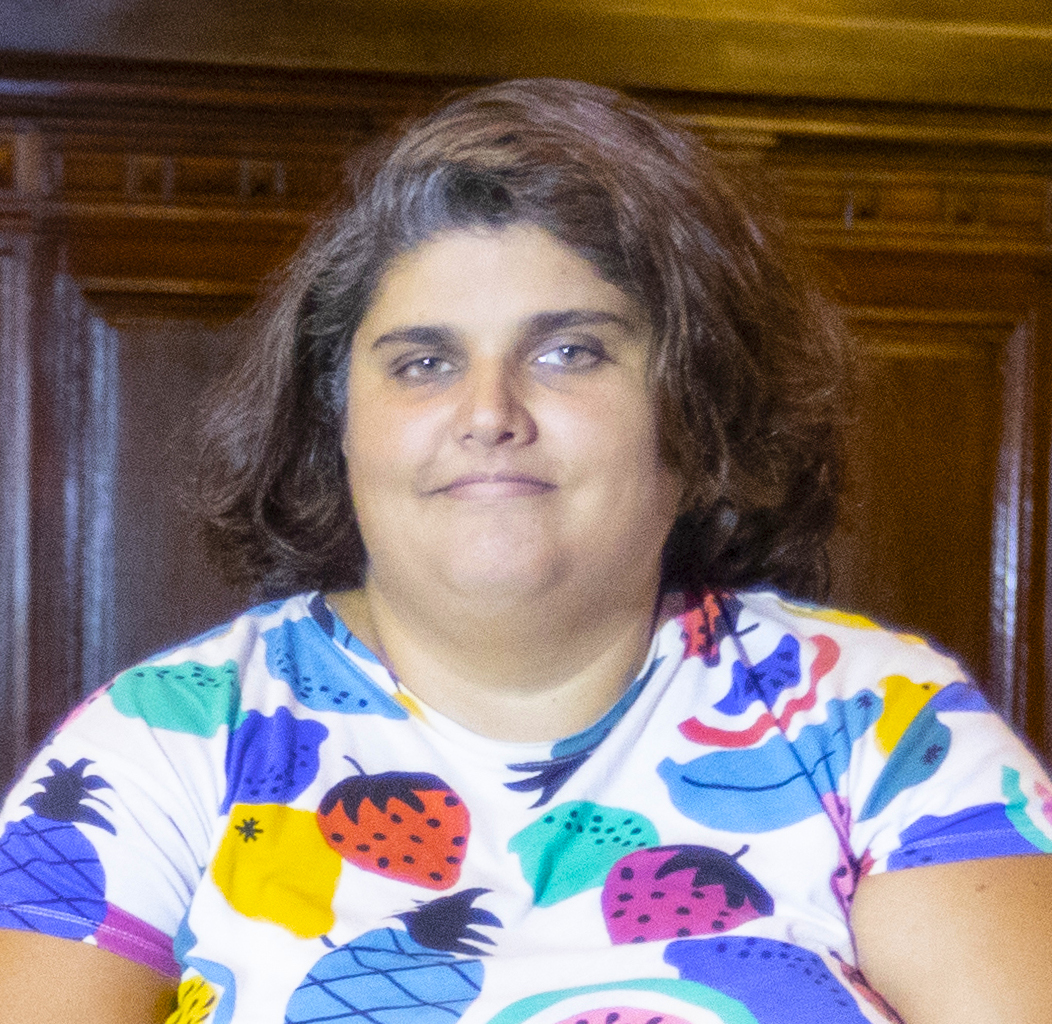
Bustamante in 2020

Maruja Bustamante, born in 1978 in Buenos Aires, is an actress of TV, cinema, theater, playwright, and lives in Buenos Aires.

== Biography ==
Maruja Bustamante trained as an actress with Helena Tritek and was her assistant at the first staging of Jorge Accame's Venecia in 1998. Since 2001 she premiered her first play as a director, with Esteban Meloni and Sebastián Mogordoy Fronterizos (2001) at Teatro Por la Identidad. She graduated from the playwriting career of the Metropolitan School of Dramatic Arts in Buenos Aires. She's part of the Royal Court program to Latin American authors.

In 2008 she's part of the program Panorama Work In Progress with her play Adela is hunting ducks (original title: Adela está cazando patos) gets her the award Trinidad Guevara Best Author (2009) and Best Costume Design (2009). Also is decorated with Award of Stimulus María Guerrero Award (2009), Best Photography and the yearly Municipal Playwriting Award of the City of Buenos Aires (2009–2016). In 2010 she debuts Paraná Porá, praised by critics and the academy, a piece written in Spanish and Guarani. The piece earned her awards as the Trinidad Guevara Award, and awards in national and international theater festivals in Argentina, Costa Rica and Spain.

She wrote and directed the episodic saga The Legend of Lis Chi (2013) in the theater 25 de Mayo (Villa Urquiza) part of the Complejo Cultural San Martin, and Roja Roja (2017) in the Teatro Regio, both co-written with Gael Policano Rossi. Her playwright work was reunited on the book Hija Boba (Blatt & Río, 2014).

== Filmography ==
Actress

- 2016: That's Not Cheating
- 2017: Mama se fue de casa

== Theater ==
Teatro
Year	Title	Role	Author
2007	No me iré sin Mirtha	Author / Director	Maruja Bustamante
2008	Adela está cazando patos	Author / Director	Maruja Bustamante
2008	Mayoría	Author / Director	Maruja Bustamante
2009	Nena no robarás	Director	Dani Umpi
2010	Paraná Porá	Author / Director	Maruja Bustamante
2011	La Reina del Maíz	Director	Damian Bojorque
2012	Trabajo para lobos	Author / Director	Maruja Bustamante
2013	Dios tenía algo guardado para nosotros	Author / Director	Maruja Bustamante
2014	Maruja enamorada	Actress	Vivi Tellas
