= Marcelo D'Andrea =

Argentine actor

Marcelo D'Andrea is an Argentine film actor.

== Filmography ==
- El Ciudadano Ilustre (2016)
- El Custodio (2006), The Minder
- Potestad (2002)
- Claim (2002)
- Yepeto (1999)
- La Peste (1992) aka The Plague
