= Santos y pecadores =

Santos y pecadores: Televisión x la justicia (Saints and sinners: Television for justice) is an Argentine miniseries, created by Bernarda Llorente and Claudio Villarruel, written by Guillermo Salmerón, directed by Rodolfo Cela and produced by Gonzalo Otálora. The plots focus on people damaged by bad judicial rulings. It was broadcast in 2013 by Canal 9 at a time when the regime of Cristina Fernández de Kirchner sent a bill to the Congress in order to control the judiciary. The series was nominated for "Best miniseries" at the 44th Martín Fierro Awards.
