= María Eugenia Suárez =

Former actress (born 1992)

- Born: María Eugenia Suárez Riveiro; March 9, 1992 (age 34); Buenos Aires, Argentina
- Occupations: Actress, singer, model
- Years active: 1997–present
- Partner(s): Nicolás Cabré (2013–2014); Benjamín Vicuña (2015–2021); Mauro Icardi (2024-Present)
- Children: 3

María Eugenia Suárez Riveiro (born 9 March 1992), better known as China Suárez or Tatiana according to Argentine Media

is a former Argentine child actress. She is better known for her multiple controversies and volatile private life.

== Early life ==
Born on March 9, 1992, in Buenos Aires to Guillermo Suárez and Marcela Riveiro Mitsumori giving her Japanese heritage through her maternal grandmother, María Eugenia Suárez Riveiro grew up with an older brother, Agustín, and attended several local secondary schools before leaving high school early to pursue an acting career.

== Career ==
Suárez made her acting debut at age eleven in Cris Morena's television series Rincón de Luz (2003), followed by supporting roles in Floricienta (2004), Amor mío (2005), and Amo de casa (2006). She gained prominence portraying Jazmín "Jaz" Romero in Cris Morena's youth series Casi Ángeles (2007–2010) and performing with its spin off pop group Teen Angels until leaving the band in early 2011; her performance earned her the Kids' Choice Awards Argentina for Favorite Actress. Between 2011 and 2014, she starred in several Argentine television productions, including Los Únicos, 30 días juntos, Solamente vos alongside Lali Espósito, and Camino al amor.

In 2015, Suárez made her feature film debut in the adaptation of Abzurdah, winning the Premio Sur for Best New Actress and recording a cover of Soda Stereo's "Trátame suavemente" for the soundtrack. That same year, she served as Argentine cinema's ambassador at the Premios Platino and launched her own clothing line. She followed this with leading film roles opposite Benjamín Vicuña in El hilo rojo (2016) and Los padecientes (2017), as well as voicing Meena in the Argentine Spanish dub of Sing (2016).

Suárez returned to television in 2019 in the period telenovela Argentina, tierra de amor y venganza, playing Raquel, a Polish immigrant lured to Argentina under false marriage pretenses and forced into prostitution, and later starred as a police officer in the thriller series Tu parte del trato.

== Personal life ==
In the early 2010s, Suárez was in a relationship with Argentine television and film producer Nacho Viale, the grandson of television host Mirtha Legrand. The relationship began around 2010 and received significant attention in Argentine entertainment media. The couple separated in 2012. From 2012 to 2013, Suárez was in a relationship with Argentine then married actor Nicolás Cabré During that period, Cabré was married to actress Eugenia Tobal. The separation between Cabré and Tobal in 2012 occurred amid widespread media speculation regarding the relationship between Cabré and Suárez while the actors were working together on the television series Los Únicos. Suárez and Cabré later confirmed their relationship publicly and had one daughter together, born in 2013. The couple subsequently separated. In that period, La China Suárez briefly dated Spanish singer David Bisbal From 2015 to 2021, Suárez was in a relationship with Chilean actor Benjamín Vicuña, with whom she has two children. Several Argentine entertainment media outlets have noted that Suárez's personal relationships and related controversies such as the "Wandagate" and the "Motorhome" have attracted significant media attention and contributed to her public profile.

In October 2021, Suárez became involved in the widely publicized controversy known as Wandagate, involving Wanda Nara and Mauro Icardi. Years later, commentators revisited the episode, noting that the situation attracted renewed public discussion in the Argentine press and on social media due to Wandagate. The affair involved Argentine media personality, TV presenter, model, singer and sports agent Wanda Nara, her second husband Mauro Icardi, model María Eugenia Suárez and Chilean actor Benjamín Vicuña.

According to French and international coverage, in 2021, Icardi was playing for Paris Saint Germain F.C. and living with his wife and manager Wanda Nara in Paris. During that period, Nara publicly accused him of having an extramarital relationship with María Eugenia Suárez after discovering explicit messages from Suárez on his phone. According to Argentine and European reports, the alleged encounter took place in Paris while Nara was traveling in Milan for work commitments. The scandal exploded after Nara posted a cryptic Instagram message implying betrayal. French and international sports media quickly connected the post to rumors circulating within PSG's locker room environment, transforming what might have been a private marital crisis into a global media spectacle.

While the incident occurred in Paris, the scandal erupted in Argentina, where the personal lives of celebrities often occupy a central role in television and digital media. Argentine outlets such as Infobae, La Nación, and entertainment programs dedicated extensive coverage to the unfolding drama. The narrative quickly expanded beyond the alleged affair itself to include leaked messages, private conversations, and speculation about the couple's marital negotiations and post nuptial agreements. Reports indicated that Icardi had admitted to exchanging intimate messages with Suárez and later sought reconciliation with Nara.

In 2023, La China Suárez dated singer Rusherking and collaborated in a song and music video with him. The song is called "Hipnotizados". From mid 2023 to 2024 Suárez dated singer, songwriter and musician Lauty Gram. According to Ciudad Magazine, Lauty Gram said that his relationship with Suárez ended on good terms. He stated that public commentary about their age difference had become a taboo during the relationship, but that his personal experience with her was different from the negative things said in the media. He also commented separately that the public controversy involving Suárez, Mauro Icardi, and Wanda Nara generated major exposure in Argentina obviously affecting them.

In a February 2026 interview with Moria Casán and published by La Nación, Suárez discussed her relationship with Mauro Icardi, and media criticism surrounding her personal life. She said that they fell in love in Paris, while he was married to Wanda Nara (2021).

As of August 2026, Mauro Icardi contract with Galatasaray Club has expired. It was officially announced by Galatasaray on July 15th 2026..

Mauro Icardi and María Eugenia "China" Suárez had been living in Argentina since June 2026 to fulfill his court mandated child custody visitation schedule, which effectively concludes his international restitution claim under the 1980 Hague Convention on the Civil Aspects of International Child Abduction. Because the Italian born minors have established their habitual and permanent residence in Buenos Aires with their mother, television presenter Wanda Nara, Argentine courts maintain jurisdiction, rendering any cross border return claims legally groundless. Concurrently, Suárez faces separate domestic legal complications; having left her own children under the care of third party nannies during recent trips to Japan and the Maldives, the biological fathers of her children are invoking Argentine family law principles regarding parental responsibility (responsabilidad parental). Under local statutes, this alleged delegation of care constitutes grounds for the fathers to legally withhold consent for any future international relocation or residence of those minors, complicating the familial dynamics of both public figures.

María Eugenia "China" Suárez no longer resides in Istanbul, following the official expiration of Mauro Icardi’s contract with Galatasaray S.K. on June 30, 2026, which left the footballer as a free agent. Parallel to Icardi's legal litigations, China Suárez faced intense legal and media scrutiny from her former partner, Benjamín Vicuña, regarding the care of their 2 Argentine born children. The dispute escalated after reports surfaced that Suárez had left her children in Istanbul in the care of nannies in order to embark on a multi destination vacation to Japan and the Maldives alongside her mother, Mauro Icardi, and a group of close friends. This arrangement drew sharp criticism from Vicuña's legal team, fueling an independent domestic custody battle over parental responsibility, international travel authorization, and the establishing of stable co parenting boundaries. In August 2026, Mauro Icardi posted aggressive posts against Benjamín Vicuña, who decided to legally request for his children to establish their center of life in Argentina as a consequence.

Mauro Icardi 's divorce is not legally finalized yet as of August 2026. Once sessions resume, evaluating the Wanda Nara and Mauro Icardi global real estate portfolio, joint corporate holdings, and image rights will mandate a multimillion dollar asset verification. Under Italian Civil Law, this will be handled via a Technical Office Consultation (Consulenza Tecnica d'Ufficio or CTU) audit. Due to the high net worth of both parties and a signed post nuptial agreement, family law experts estimate this complex CTU financial audit will take between 5 to 8 years before a final financial judgment is entered.

== The Transnational Family Dispute and Judicial Leverage ==
China Suárez and Mauro Icardi intensified public and legal scrutiny after being spotted on a luxury shopping excursion together at Crayon Posadas, an upscale children's boutique located inside the Posadas Plaza Shopping mall in Misiones. The high profile sighting occurred amidst escalating legal friction, directly following news that Icardi was fighting massive alimony and child support demands from Wanda Nara. By openly gathering luxury shopping bags at one of the region's premier high end retailers, the pair fueled intense media backlash, providing opposing legal counsel with highly visible, documented evidence of Icardi's financial solvency and immediate liquidity. In Argentine family courts, such public displays of luxury spending serve as critical circumstantial evidence that can directly undermine a debtor’s claims of financial hardship during ongoing support disputes.

Meanwhile, the legal reality of Mauro Icardi’s free agency combined with China Suárez’s employment fluctuations creates a distinct family law dynamic affecting her previous partner, Benjamín Vicuña. Vicuña’s primary legal leverage does not stem from Suárez's career status, but from the geographic stability of their shared minors. The official expiration of Mauro Icardi’s multi million euro contract with Galatasaray marked a massive turning point for Vicuña, effectively dismantling Suárez’s legal justification for anchoring the children in Istanbul.

Prior to Icardi becoming a free agent, Vicuña faced severe parental friction. Suárez repeatedly subverted their judicially mandated custody schedule arbitrarily extending the children's time in Turkey, missing legal return dates to Argentina, and going as far as to unilaterally enroll the minors in Turkish schools without Vicuña’s required parental consent. The logistical arrangement reached a boiling point when a major media scandal erupted revealing that Suárez had left the children in Turkey solely in the care of hired nannies while she traveled to Europe with Icardi, directly violating her parental duty of care.

With Icardi's contract officially over and no legitimate employment binding the family to Turkey, Vicuña successfully halted these cross border violations, legally securing his children's return to their habitual residence and schooling in Argentina. Ironically, Mauro Icardi's refusal to sign for his daughter's passports legally established Argentina as the Habitual residence for his biological daughters.

From a sports management and regulatory perspective, Argentina has solidified as the definitive residence for Mauro Icardi and China Suárez following the official closure of the primary international transfer windows. With major global leagues finalizing their rosters and Icardi remaining unsigned, the veteran forward’s status as a free agent effectively grounds his personal and professional logistics within the domestic territory for the upcoming competitive cycle.

== Forced Retirement and commercial boycott ==
Following the expiration of his contract with Turkey's Galatasaray S.K. on June 30, 2026, the professional career of Mauro Icardi entered a period of profound uncertainty, leaving him formally as a free agent. Despite his goalscoring record, the Argentine forward has experienced severe difficulties signing with a new club due to the heavily negative impact of his off field profile. Various European analysts and specialized media outlets have publicly discouraged his signing; a report published by the sports portal Viola Nation on August 21, 2026, labeled the player a "one man walking soap opera," strictly advising against his transfer to Italy's Serie A.

The article emphasized that constant off pitch distractions, including a complex international legal battle over divorce, child support, and custody of his daughters, travel restrictions, litigation over unpaid rent in Istanbul, and intense media exposure alongside his current partner, actress Eugenia "China" Suárez have buried his professional prospects, turning him into a high risk institutional asset for any top tier club.

Meanwhile, several commercial brands in Argentina have distanced themselves from actress and influencer María Eugenia "China" Suárez. While the situation is often described as an informal "commercial boycott" or the "end of her era as an influencer," the retreat is heavily driven by overwhelming social media backlash and corporate risk management rather than an official, coordinated ban.

Following the massive 2021 celebrity scandal involving TV host, actress and singer Wanda Nara and footballer Mauro Icardi, a few major brands immediately rescinded or chose not to renew their contracts with China Suárez to avoid public controversy. Suárez subsequently launched legal lawsuits against these companies, claiming that their termination of her contracts caused massive financial and reputational damage.Entertainment journalists on Argentine networks like El Diario de Mariana (DDM) reported that Suárez had virtually lost all of her national brand sponsorships. Marketing and commercial teams reportedly stopped booking her to avoid permanent drama.

== Controversy and Road Safety Violation (2026) ==
In September 2026, Suárez was involved in a highly publicized road safety controversy that resulted in government sanctions. The incident arose after she posted footage on social media from inside Mauro Icardi's private gated community, which depicted her unbuckling her seatbelt, climbing onto the car door, and leaning half of her upper body out of the window of a moving vehicle while singing a song by Dua Lipa.

The vehicle was being operated by her partner, footballer Mauro Icardi. The video prompted an official intervention by the Ministry of Transportation of the Buenos Aires Province, with the Undersecretariat of Road Policy and Safety publicly condemning the behavior as reckless and negligent.

While the subsequent investigation led to the suspension of Icardi's driver's license due to an expired permit and his refusal to comply with safety regulations, the incident drew widespread media scrutiny and public criticism focused on Suárez for showcasing and promoting hazardous driving practices to her large social media following.

Response to her road Safety Violation

In contemporary Latin American media, María Eugenia "China" Suárez is frequently characterized by a public persona heavily defined by tabloid controversy and instances of public defiance, which media commentators note have largely eclipsed her artistic career. This pattern of behavior is exemplified by her response to a September 2026 traffic incident, where she and soccer player Mauro Icardi faced legal sanctions from the Ministry of Transportation of the Province of Buenos Aires for filming a reckless driving stunt inside a gated community in Nordelta. Rather than issuing a standard public relations apology, Suárez utilized her digital platform to mock the government intervention, publishing a satirical parody using a child's toy car driven by her youngest child with actor Benjamín Vicuña alongside the caption "¿Así mejor?" ("Is this better?").

Critics point out that this incident reflects a long documented cycle in Suárez's career, wherein high profile personal scandals, such as the highly publicized 2021 "Wandagate" affair that disrupted Icardi's tenure at Paris Saint Germain are met with an institutional disdain that reinforces her reputation for prioritizing media engagement over civic accountability.

== Search warrant and evidence seizure ==
During the November 6, 2026 confrontation at Mauro Icardi's residence in Nordelta, former actress Eugenia "La China" Suárez, who is in a relationship with Icardi, became embroiled in a heated verbal altercation with famous Tv personality Wanda Nara after defending Icardi against the physical abuse allegations made by his 11 year old daughter, Francesca Icardi. According to Argentine media reports, Nara arrived at the property accompanied by her partner, Martín Migueles, following distressed messages from Francesca who was locked inside a room at Mauro Icardi's home, leading to an argument with Icardi outside the home. When Suárez attempted to intervene and publicly backed Icardi offering a version of events that contradicted Francesca's account of being struck she and Nara engaged in an intense exchange of insults in front of neighbors and responding officers. Police personnel at the scene intervened to de escalate the confrontation and instructed Suárez not to interfere while authorities conducted emergency and child welfare procedures. Rather than posting cash bail, Mauro Icardi avoided detention because the alleged offense carries a relatively short statutory sentence and he was granted an exemption from prison (eximición de prisión) under sworn bail (caución juratoria). Under the Argentine Penal Code, the charge of aggravated minor injuries (lesiones leves agravadas) carries a prison term of six months to two years, meaning any potential conviction would qualify for a suspended sentence rather than immediate incarceration. Following a preventive motion filed by his defense attorney, Francisco Oneto, Guarantees Judge Orlando Abel Díaz allowed Icardi to remain free based on a formal written oath to submit to the judicial process without requiring a financial deposit. To maintain this status and avoid arrest, her partner, former footballer Mauro Icardi must appear in person before the court within five days to formalize the agreement and strictly comply with the 45 day restraining order prohibiting him from approaching or contacting his daughter.On November 12th, 2026 Mauro Icardi testified further incriminating himself and María Eugenia Suárez by admitting that the couple filmed Icardi's oldest daughter while crying, sat on the living room to coach her phone call with a court appointed official (licenciada Fernanda Matera) and filmed the child while triangulating the younger child to contradict her sister's physical abuse allegations.

=== November 2026 Nordelta investigation and social media dispute ===
On November 14th and amid scrutiny over her alleged role in pressuring 11 year old Francesca Icardi during a court supervised phone call in Nordelta, Suárez launched a social media offensive that commentators described as an attempt to deflect public attention from the Tigre judicial investigation toward familiar celebrity spectacle. Her effort to claim the moral high ground declaring herself "millonaria en la vida" ("a millionaire in life") while boasting of past career milestones prompted pushback over contradictions in her public record. Critics noted that her Gran Rex theater sellouts occurred as part of Teen Angels, the ensemble pop group created by producer Cris Morena that launched former bandmate Lali Espósito to solo stadium success, whereas Suárez's solo music career has drawn more coverage for personal controversy than commercial draw. Observers also contrasted her assertions of personal integrity against past relationships involving married men, including Nicolás Cabré during his marriage to actress Eugenia Tobal, Mauro Icardi during his marriage to Wanda Nara, and Benjamín Vicuña. During the 2015 "motorhome" controversy, Suárez swore on television that no affair had occurred with Vicuña, dismissing Carolina "Pampita" Ardohain's account before later confirming the relationship and having two children with him. Combined with subsequent media coverage linking her to Formula 1 driver Franco Colapinto and denied rumors involving footballer Rodrigo De Paul, commentators characterized her November 2026 vulgar and explicit posts against TV celebrity Wanda Nara as a distraction from the ongoing legal proceedings.

China Suárez faces widespread criticism in Argentine media and on social media after publicly defending Icardi amid a criminal investigation and restraining order stemming from physical abuse allegations involving his 11 year old daughter.

== Filmography ==
=== Film ===
Year	Title	Character
2015	Abzurdah	Cielo Latini
2016	El hilo rojo	Abril
2016	Sing	Meena (voice dub)
2017	Los padecientes	Paula Vanussi
2017	Sólo Se Vive Una Vez	Flavia
2019	Así habló el cambista	Graciela
2019	Pacto de fuga	Lucía
2020	Hasta el cielo ida y vuelta	
2021	Sing 2	Meena (voice dub)
2022	Objetos	Sara
2023	El Duelo	Rita
2024	Linda	Linda

=== Television ===
Year	Title	Channel	Character
2003	Rincón de luz	Canal 9	Pía
2004–2005	Floricienta	El Trece	Paz
2005	Amor mio	Telefe	Violeta
2006	Amo de casa	Canal 9	Catalina
2007–2010	Casi Ángeles	Telefe	Jazmín Romero
2011–2012	Los Unicos	Canal 13	Sofía Reyes
2012	30 días juntos	Cosmopolitan	Leni
2013	Solamente vos	El Trece	Julieta Cousteau
2014	Camino al amor	Telefe	Pía Arriaga
2018	Sandro de América	Telefe	Susana Giménez
2018	Sitiados	Telefe	Margaret of Austria, Queen of Spain
2019	Argentina, tierra de amor y venganza	El Trece	Raquel Liberman
2019	Otros pecados	El Trece	Narrator
2019	El jardín de bronce	HBO/El Trece	Attorney
2019	Berko: el arte de callar	FOX/TVN	Journalist
2019	Tu parte del trato	El Trece/TNT	Police woman
2019	Héroes invisibles		
2020	62: Historia de un mundial		Nélida Lobato
2020	Solitarios anónimos		
2021	Terapia Alternativa	Star+	
2025	Hija del Fuego : la venganza de la bastarda	Disney+	Clara Cortéz

== Discography ==
=== Singles ===
List of singles as lead artist with chart positions
Title	Year	Peaks		Album
Title	Year	ARG	URU	Album
"El Juego del Amor" (with Celli)	2022	67	—	Non-album singles
"Lo Que Dicen de Mí"	2022	—	—	Non-album singles
"Ya No Quiero Verte" (with El Polaco)	2022	16	9	Non-album singles
"Hipnotizados" (with Rusherking)	2023	72	—	Non-album singles
"Desaniversario"	2023	—	—	Non-album singles
"Pasatiempo" (with Ecko)	2023	64	—	Non-album singles
"Ay Ay Ay"	2023	—	—	Non-album singles
"El Amor Que Tú Me Das" (with Rodrigo Tapari)	2023	—	—	Non-album singles
"La Culpa" (with The La Planta)	2023	—	—	Non-album singles
"Corazón de Cartón"	2023	—	—	Non-album singles
"Me Gusta" (with Ecko)	2024	—	—	Non-album singles
"Llora Como Un Arrepentido" (with L-Gante and Jairo Vera featuring Gino Mella)	2024	—	—	Non-album singles
"—" denotes a recording that did not chart or was not released in that territory.

=== Promotional singles ===
List of promotional singles
Title	Year	Project
"Nada Es Igual"	2012	30 Días Juntos
"Trátame Suavemente"	2015	Abzurdah
"You Know I'm No Good"	2016	El Hilo Rojo

=== Other appearances ===
List of guest appearances showing year released and album name
Title	Year	Other artist(s)	Album
"Reina Gitana"	2007	None	Teenangels
"Te Perdí"	2008	None	Teen Angels 2
"Puedo Ser"	2008	Lali	Teen Angels 2
"Quiero Salir del Paraíso"	2010	Lali	Teenangels 4
"Cambiar de Aire"	2010	Benjamín Amadeo	Teenangels 4

== Awards and nominations ==
Year	Award	Category	Nominated	Notes	Result
2008	CAPIF Award	Best Album by a Film/Television Band	Teen Angels 2	With Teen Angels	Nominated
2009–10	Los 40 Principales Award	Best Argentine Artist	Teen Angels	With Teen Angels	Won
2011	Nickelodeon Argentina Kids' Choice Awards	Best Actress	Casi Ángeles	with Casi Ángeles	Won
2011	Nickelodeon Argentina Kids' Choice Awards	Best New Actress	Casi Ángeles	with Casi Ángeles	Nominated
2013	Nickelodeon Argentina Kids' Choice Awards	Twitter Star of the Year	Herself		Nominated
2015	Argentine Academy of Cinematography Arts and Sciences Awards	Best Actress	Abzurdah		Nominated
2015	Academy of Motion Picture Arts and Sciences of Argentina Awards	Best New Actress	Abzurdah		Won
2016	Argentinean Film Critics Association Awards	Best New Actress	Abzurdah		Nominated
