= Paola Krum =

Argentine actress

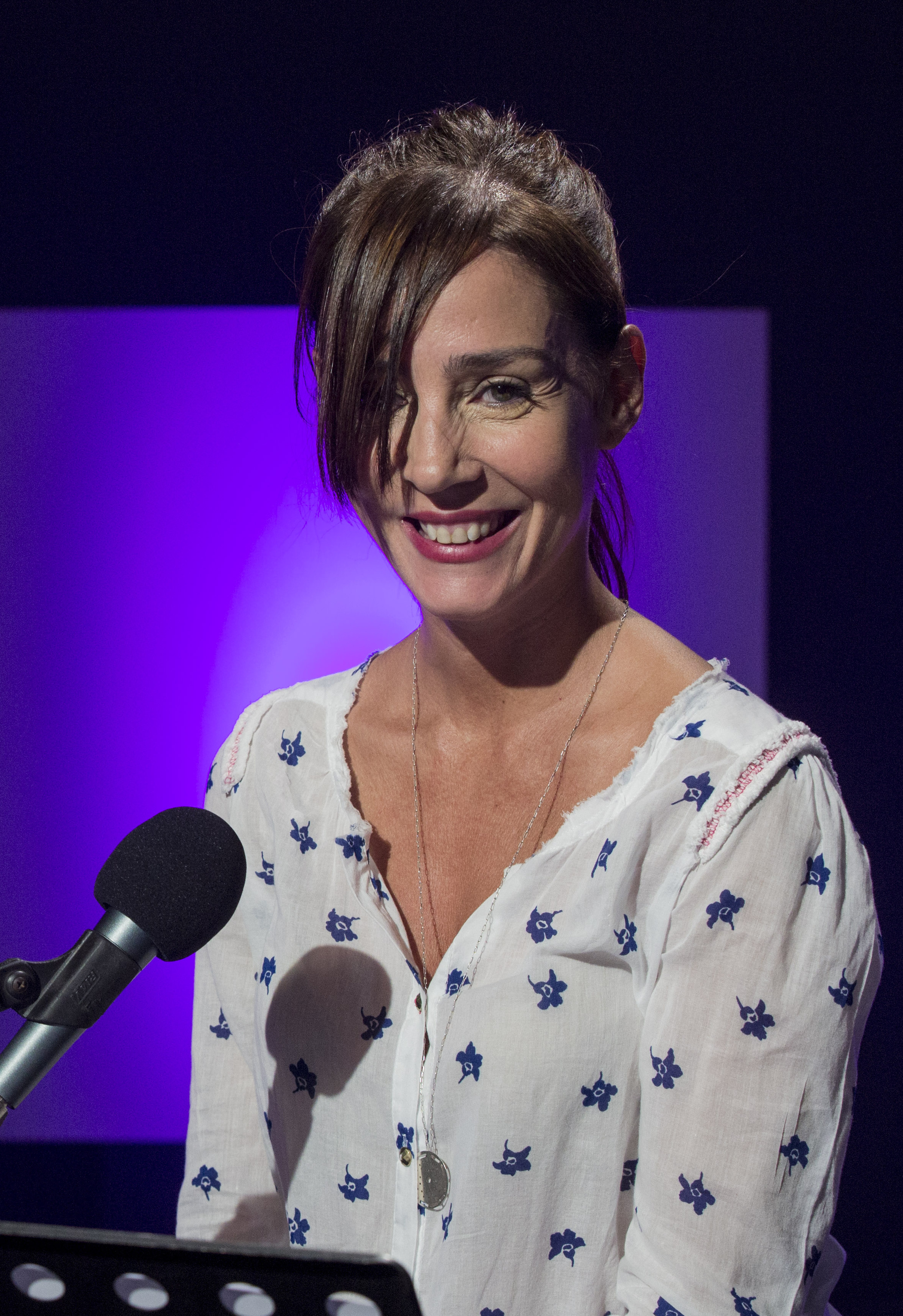
- Paola Krum on February 27, 2015 at the event "Somos Todas Mujeres" of TV Pública at the Ministry of Culture in Buenos Aires.
- Born: Andrea Paola Krum; June 21, 1970 (age 56); Palermo, Ciudad de Buenos Aires, Argentina
- Other name: Paola Krum
- Occupations: Actress; Singer; Dancer
- Years active: 1990–present
- Spouse: Joaquín Furriel (m. 2005; div. 2011)
- Partner(s): Pablo Rago (1994–1997); Luciano Greco (2014–2018)
- Children: 1

Andrea Paola Krum (born June 21, 1970) better known as Paola Krum is an actress, singer, and dancer.

== Biography ==
Andrea Paola Krum was born on June 21, 1970, in Palermo, Buenos Aires. She is the only daughter of Raúl Krum and Teresita O’Donnell. She has three younger brothers.

She began studying classical dance as a child with Wasil Tupin and Merces Serrano, but an injury in her leg at age 15 changed all her ambitions.

== Career ==
Her breakthrough came in the field of musical comedy. Work in television – in shows such as Sólo Para Pareja, Inconquistable Corazón, Por siempre mujercitas, and El Arcángel. In 1996, she starred in the theatrical production of Flores de Acero. Later, she played the protagonist in the weekly TV show, El Rafa, and in the telenovela, Alas, Poder Y Pasión. Her film debut came in 1999 in Río Escondido, directed by Mercedes García Guevara. That same year she had a major role in Muñeca Brava, an Argentine telenovela and starring in the film La venganza. She was part of the cast of the play, Puck, Sueño de Una Noche de Veran. In 2000, she returned to musical comedy, playing Eliza Doolittle in Mi Bella Dama (My Fair Lady). She last appeared on-stage in Monólogos de La Vagina (The Vagina Monologues). Back on TV in 2001, she starred in the series Cuatro Amigas. In 2003, Paola traveled to Spain to film the made for TV movie, La Vida Aquí. Her played psychologist Dr. Laura Santini in the 2004 HBO mini-series Epitafios (shown in the United States in 2005). In 2006 she appeared in Montecristo, which aired on Telefe.

== Filmography ==
=== Television ===
Year	Title	Character	Channel	Notes
1990	Pacto de amistad	Laura	Canal 9	
1991	Regalo del cielo	Luciana Estrada	Canal 9	
1991	Amigos son los amigos	Carolina	Canal 9	
1993	Solo para parejas	Paola	Canal 9	
1994–1995	Inconquistable corazón	Mónica Sandoval	Canal 9	
1995	Alta comedia	Paola	Canal 9	Episode: "El minuto final"
1995–1996	Por siempre mujercitas	Alejandra Morales	Canal 9	
1996	Los especiales de Alejandro Doria	Águeda	Telefe	Episode: "Cavar un foso"
1997	El arcángel	Andrea "Andy" Blum	Telefe	
1997	El Rafa	Camila Bermúdez	Telefe	
1998	Alas, poder y pasión	Cecilia Freyre	Canal 13	
1999	Muñeca brava	Florencia Rizzo de Di Carlo-Miranda	Telefe	
2001	Cuentos de película	María	TV Pública	Episode: "La cautiva"
2001	Cuatro amigas	Sofía Quevedo	Telefe	
2002	099 Central	Patricia Ledesma	Canal 13	
2002	Infieles	Carola	Telefe	Episode: "El caso M"
2003	La vida aquí	Ana		Telefilme
2004	Epitafios	Laura Santini	HBO	
2005	Botines	Sofía	Canal 13	Episode 10: "Feliz año nuevo, mi amor"
2005	Mujeres asesinas	Lisa	Canal 13	Episode 15: "Lisa, la soñadora"
2006	Montecristo	Laura Ledesma Saénz	Telefe	
2011	El elegido	Mariana Estévez	Telefe	
2012–2013	Tiempos compulsivos	Julieta Despeyroux	Canal 13	
2013	Malvinas 30 miradas	Angélica	TV Pública	Short film: "Teoría sobre las colonias"
2017	Quiero vivir a tu lado	Verónica Petrucci de Romano	Canal 13	
2019	Otros pecados	Verónica Fletcher	Canal 13	Episode 2: "Las manos"
2022	The First of Us	Jimena Rauch	Telefe	

=== Theater ===
Year	Title	Character	Theater
1991–1992	Drácula, el musical	Lucy	Luna Park
1993	El Jorobado de París	Esmeralda	Luna Park
1996	Steel Magnolias	Shelby	Lasalle
1999	Puck, sueño de una noche de verano	Titania	La Trastienda
2000	Mi bella dama	Eliza	Teatro El Nacional
2001	Los monólogos de la vagina		Paseo La Plaza
2004	Aplausos	Eva	Teatro El Nacional
2005	Sueño de una noche de verano	Titania	Teatro Municipal General San Martín
2007	Tres versiones de la vida	Sonia	Multiteatro
2013	Traición	Emma	El Picadero
2014	A Electra le sienta bien el luto	Electra	Teatro Municipal General San Martín
2015–2016	La chica del adiós	Paula	Teatro Metropolitan
2019	Después de casa de muñecas	Nora	Paseo La Plaza
2022	Las Irresponsables	Nuria	Teatro Astros

=== Movies ===
Year	Movie	Character	Director
1998	El faro	Sonia	Eduardo Mignogna
1999	La venganza	Yoli	Juan Carlos Desanzo
1999	Río escondido	Ana	Mercedes García Guevara
2001	Nada por perder	Agustina Romero	Enrique Aguilar
2001	La cautiva	María	Israel Adrián Caetano
2003	El séptimo arcángel	Paula	
2003	La vida aquí	Ana	
2005	La suerte está echada	Maribel	

== Awards and nominations ==
Year	Award	Category	Program	Result
1994	Martín Fierro Awards	Revelation Actress for Protagonist in Television	Inconquistable corazón	Nominated
1997	Martín Fierro Awards	Actress Protagonist of Telenovela	El Rafa	Nominated
1999	Silver Condor Awards	Revelation Actress for Protagonist in Movie	Río escondido	Nominated
2000	ACE Awards	Actress Protagonist in Musical Comedy	Mi Bella Dama	Winner
2001	Konex Foundation	Musical Actress	Trajectory of the last decade	Winner
2006	Martín Fierro Awards	Actress Protagonist of Telenovela	Montecristo	Nominated
2009	Premios Martín Fierro	Actress Protagonist of Miniseries	Epitafios	Nominated
2011	Martín Fierro Awards	Actress Protagonist of Telenovela	El elegido	Nominated
2012	Tato Awards	Actress Protagonist of Miniseries	Tiempos compulsivos	Nominated
2014	ACE Awards	Actress Protagonist in Drama	A Electra le sienta bien el luto	Nominated
2015	ACE Awards	Actress of Daily Comedy	La chica del adiós	Winner
