= Gloria Carrá =

Argentine actress

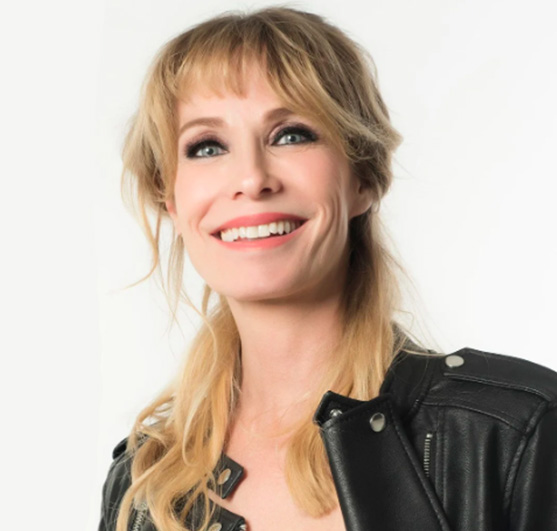
- Born: Gloria Andrea Curra; June 15, 1971 (age 54); Banfield, Buenos Aires, Argentina
- Other names: Gloria Carrá
- Occupations: Actress; Singer; Composer
- Years active: 1982–present
- Height: 1.60 m (5 ft 3 in)
- Spouse: Luciano Cáceres (2008–2015)
- Children: Ángela Torres (b. 1998); Amelia Cáceres Curra (b. 2009)

Gloria Andrea Curra (born June 15, 1971 in Banfield, Buenos Aires, Argentina) better known as Gloria Carrá is an Argentine actress, singer and composer. She changed her real last name on the advice of the actor Darío Vittori.

== Music ==
She is the founder, lead singer, guitarist and composer of the band Coronados de Gloria. In 2018, she and several other female artists recorded a version of the song "Bella Ciao" in support of the right to legal abortion in Argentina.

== Filmography ==
=== Television ===
Year	Title	Character	Channel
1982	Nosotros y los miedos		Canal 9
1983-1985	Señorita Maestra	Mercedes "Meche" Ferreiro	TV Pública
1987	Tu mundo y el mío	Tati	Canal 11
1987	Estrellita mía	Lili	Canal 11
1988	Pasiones	Ondina	Canal 9
1989-1990	Los otros y nosotros	Carolina	Canal 13/Canal 9
1991-1992	La banda del Golden Rocket	Evelyn	Canal 13
1991	Manuela	Jenny	Canal 13
1992	Inolvidable	Teresa	Canal 13
1994	Aprender a volar	Eugenia	Canal 13
1995	Alta comedia		Canal 9
1995	Sin condena		Canal 9
1995	Nueve lunas		Canal 13
1996	Sueltos	Andrea	Canal 13
1996	Alta comedia		Canal 9
1996	Poliladron		Canal 13
1997	Hombre de mar	Mariana	Canal 13
1998	La nocturna	Malena	Canal 13
1999-2000	Verano del '98	Amparo Guzmán	Telefe
2001	Culpables	Romina	Canal 13
2002	1000 millones	Gladys	Canal 13
2003	Infieles		Telefe
2004	Culpable de este amor	Virginia Marvin	Telefe
2005	Numeral 15		Telefe
2005	Ambiciones	Grace	Telefe
2005	Conflictos en red	Carina	Telefe
2006	Chiquititas Sin Fin	Betiana Dalecio/Beatriz Pérez	Telefe
2006	Mujeres asesinas	Delia	Canal 13
2007-2008	Patito feo	Blanca Bernardi	Canal 13
2010	Para vestir santos	María Eugenia	Canal 13
2011	Los únicos	Petra	Canal 13
2011	Televisión x la inclusión	Florencia	Canal 9
2011	Maltratadas	Juliana	América TV/Teledoce
2012	Perfidia	Cecilia Salguero	TV Pública
2012-2013	Tiempos compulsivos	Teresa Guglietti	Canal 13
2013	Historias de corazón	Rocío	Telefe
2014	Sres. Papis	Carla De Leone	Telefe
2015	La casa del mar	Ana Heller	DirecTV
2016	Silencios de familia	Daniela Arévalo	Canal 13
2017	Reencuentros	Angie	Canal 13
2019	Pequeña Victoria	Anette Aguilar	Telefe

=== Theater ===
Year	Title	Theater
1983-1985	Señorita maestra	Teatro Nacional
1993	La Banda del Golden Rocket	Teatro Gran Rex
1994	Las mariposas son libres	Teatro Nacional
1994	Blanco sobre blanco	Teatro Nacional de Mar del Plata
2002	Bésame mucho	Teatro Paseo la Plaza
2003-2004 and 2014	¿Estás ahí?	Teatro Maipo
2006	Frida y yo	Teatro Paseo la Plaza
2007	La felicidad	Teatro San Martín
2007-2008	Patito feo	Teatro Gran Rex
2010	Qué será de ti	Teatro Maipo
2011	4D óptico	Teatro San Martín
2012	En el cuarto de al lado	Teatro Paseo la Plaza
2014	Red Carpet	Teatro San Martín
2017-2019	Cuando llueve	Teatro San Martín and Teatro Multiescena
2018-2019	La Ratonera	Teatro Multitabaris, National Tour and Regional Countries
2019–2020	Sex, viví tu experiencia	Gorriti Art Center
2022–present	Las Irresponsables	Teatro Astros

=== Movies ===
Year	Movie	Character	Director
1994	Una sombra ya pronto serás	Rita	Héctor Olivera
1997	El mundo contra mí		Beda Docampo Feijóo
2006	Agua	María	Verónica Chen
2006	Chile 672	Reyna	
2007	UPA! Una película argentina	Herself	
2009	The Widows of Thursdays	Lala	Marcelo Piñeyro
2010	Tenemos que hablar		Verónica Chen
2015	Abzurdah		Daniela Coggi
2018	Animal	Josefina Hertz	Armando Bó
2019	High Tide	Laura	Verónica Chen

=== Television Programs ===
Year	Program	Channel	Notes
2021	Bailando 2021	Canal 13	Participant

== Awards and nominations ==
Year	Award	Category	Work	Result
2001	ACE Awards	Best Actress	Bésame mucho	Nominated
2004	ACE Awards	Best Comedy Actress	¿Estás ahí?	Nominated
2008	ACE Awards	Best Actress	La felicidad	Nominated
2012	Tato Awards	Best Supporting Actress in Unitary Fiction	Tiempos compulsivos	Winner
2012	Tato Awards	Best Supporting Actress in Unitary Fiction	Perfidia	Nominated
2013	Tato Awards	Best Leading Actress in Drama	Tiempos compulsivos	Nominated
2013	Martín Fierro Awards	Best Actress in Miniseries	Tiempos compulsivos	Nominated
2015	Martín Fierro Awards	Best Supporting Actress	Sres. Papis	Nominated
2015	Sur Awards	Best Supporting Actress	Abzurdah	Nominated
2016	Tato Awards	Best Supporting Actress	La casa del mar	Nominated
2017	Martín Fierro Awards	Best Supporting Actress	Silencios de familia	Nominated
