= Cultural depictions of Eva Perón =

Eva Perón (May 7, 1919 – July 26, 1952), former First Lady of Argentina, has been a consistent presence in popular culture in her homeland and internationally ever since her debut as an actress. The following lists cover various media to include items of historic interest, enduring works of art, and recent representations in popular culture.

== Literature and theater ==
Date	Title	Author	Actress playing Evita	Notes
1952	The Woman with the Whip	Mary Main	Inapplicable	The book is strongly anti-Peronist. It depicts Evita as not only manipulative but also as a promiscuous woman who made use of men to get her own power, a claim that has never been substantiated. Furthermore, Main discusses Eva's 'shameless flaunting of jewels' in great depth but deliberately undermines all that Eva did for the people of Argentina.
1970	Evita, vida y obra de Eva Perón	Héctor Germán Oesterheld and Alberto Breccia	Inapplicable	Comic book biography of Eva Perón, narrated from a strong Peronist point of view. It is not a conventional comic book, as it lacks speech balloons or sequential action from one panel to the other. It is instead a written biography by Oesterheld with related interpretations by Breccia. It was not published at the time of creation due to political censorship, but the originals were found and it was edited at 2002 and 2007.
1973	Mi hermana Evita (Evita, My Sister)	Erminda Duarte	Inapplicable	The older sister of Eva Perón relates the political and human facts of her life in a personal way.
1976 (concept album); 1978 (West End); 1979 (Broadway)	Evita	Andrew Lloyd Webber and Tim Rice	Julie Covington (concept album); Elaine Paige (West End); Patti LuPone (Broadway)	Internationally, perhaps the most famous depiction of Eva Perón. The musical was preceded by a concept album in 1976 with Julie Covington singing the title role, then two years later debuted in London's West End with Elaine Paige, who won an Olivier Award for her performance. Its subsequent Broadway debut in 1979 was with Patti LuPone in the title role, for which she won a Tony Award.
1986	Eva	Pedro Orgambide	Nacha Guevara	Argentine musical made in response to the one by Lloyd Webber and Rice. With Nacha Guevara in the leading role. The play was performed a second time during 2008.
1995	Santa Evita	Tomas Eloy Martinez	Inapplicable	Fictionalized account of Eva Perón's life and the transcontinental travel of her corpse. Translated into 32 languages and published in 50 countries.
2007	Evita, Evita en Fotos	Felipe Pigna	Inapplicable	Appear here multiple public and private aspects of life, intense, brief, the "champion of the poor" are portrayed in an extensive and comprehensive photo tour and a text written by Felipe Pigna particular, to account for the truth, legends, myths, love and hate surrounding the image of Argentina's most famous. "
2007	Farklı Rüyalar Sokağı (Street of Assorted Dreams)	Nazlı Eray	Inapplicable	Turkish novel following multiple stories, including the events following the death of Evita as well as an anonymous narrator visited nightly by an angel describing her life.
2009	The Big Wake-Up	Mark Coggins	Inapplicable	Altered conclusion of the bizarre history of Eva Perón's peripatetic remains. Rather than resting in the Duarte family tomb in La Recoleta Cemetery in Buenos Aires, Coggins posits that the body in La Recoleta is a duplicate and that Eva's specially embalmed corpse has been secretly buried in the San Francisco Bay Area under a false name.
2012	EVITA, Jirones de su vida	Felipe Pigna	Inapplicable	With extensive documentation and testimony, Felipe Pigna traces the life of "the most loved and most hated of Argentina", the truths, legends, myths, loves and hatreds that were woven around its controversial figure in the public and private multifaceted .

== Television and motion pictures ==
Date	Title	Director	Actress playing Evita	Notes
1973	Little Mother	Radley Metzger	Christiane Krüger	Christiane Krüger portrayed the character of "Marina Pinares" in a thinly veiled exploitation film biopic about Eva .
1981	Evita Peron	Marvin J. Chomsky	Faye Dunaway	Faye Dunaway stars in this TV movie .
1984	Evita, quien quiera oír que oiga	Eduardo Mignona	Flavia Palmiero	With Flavia Palmiero as Evita, the movie represents her early times, leaving her born city and moving to Buenos Aires. The movie uses as well archive material from the '40 and '50 decades, and interviews with people who meet her.
1996	Evita	Alan Parker	Madonna	Major motion picture adaptation of the stage musical starring Madonna in the title role.
1996	Eva Perón: The True Story	Juan Carlos Desanzo	Esther Goris	Argentine submission for Academy Award for Best Foreign Film. Starring Esther Goris in title role .
2003	The President Wore Pearls	Mike B. Anderson	Inapplicable	Episode of The Simpsons where Lisa Simpson becomes politically active in her school. Lisa Simpson dresses as Eva Perón and sings songs inspired by the musical Evita. Episode ends with a note from the directors that says, "On the advice of our lawyers, we swear we have never heard of a musical based on the life of Eva Perón".
2004	Ay Juancito	Héctor Olivera	Laura Novoa	About the life of Juancito Duarte, Eva Perón's brother and a political officer during Juan Domingo Perón's first presidency.
2004	Padre Coraje	Martín Saban and Sebastián Pivotto	Ximena Fassi	Guest appearance for 3 episodes.
2007	La Señal	Ricardo Darín and Martín Hodara	None	Movie set in Argentina in the respective time period. Although Evita is not represented directly, there are references to the social impact of Evita's declining health and death, setting parallelisms between it and the story of the characters.
2008	Evita	Eduardo Montes-Bradley	Documentary footage of Eva Perón	Documentary on the life of Eva Perón produced by Heritage Film Project.
2010	Lo que el tiempo nos dejó	Israel Adrián Caetano	Laura Novoa	Miniseries of unrelated television films focused at different key events of the history of Argentina, made during the Argentina Bicentennial. The first one represents the last year of Evita, from the point of view of her nurse (played by Vanesa González).
2011	Juan y Eva	Paula de Luque	Julieta Díaz	
2011	Eva de la Argentina	María Seoane	Inapplicable	Animated film about Eva Perón, with images made by the comic book artist Francisco Solano López
2012	Carta a Eva	Agustí Villaronga	Julieta Cardinali	The story tells of Doña Juana, Carmen Polo and Eva Perón. Three women intertwine their lives during the official visit to Spain Eva isolated from the world in June 1947.
2015	Eva Doesn't Sleep	Pablo Agüero	Sabrina Macchi	Details the fate of Perón's corpse.
2022	Santa Evita	Rodrigo García Barcha, Alejandro Maci	Natalia Oreiro	Details the fate of Perón's corpse.

== Stage persona homage ==
Date	Character name	Actor	Notes
? – present	"Evita Bezuidenhout" and "Tannie Evita"	Pieter-Dirk Uys	In tribute to Eva Perón, South African comedian Pieter-Dirk Uys developed this character that is alternately known as "Evita Bezuidenhout" and "Tannie Evita".

== Songs ==
This list does not include songs from the Lloyd Webber and Rice musical, its concept album, its film adaptation, or the film's soundtrack.

Date	Title	Artist	Notes
1948	Evita Capitana ("Captain Evita")	Unknown	Argentine Peronist anthem. This is the female version of "The Peronist March", the same melody but with lyrics focused on Eva Perón
2006	Maria Eva	Ignacio Copani	A popular Argentine singer from a Peronist background records a defense of Eva Perón. Song is in response to the 2006 London revival of the Lloyd Webber and Rice musical.
2006	Olvidarte No Podran ("They Can't Forget You")	Patricia Sosa	Tribute to Eva Perón. The singer claims that people can love or hate Eva Perón, but they can't forget her.

== See also ==
- Che Guevara in popular culture
