= Mi Mensaje =

Last book written by Evita, first lady of Argentina, between 1945 and 1952

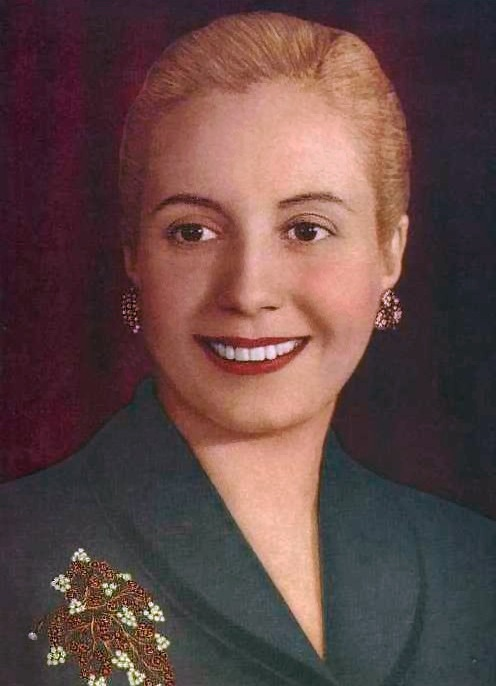
Evita, the author

Mi mensaje is the last book written by the first lady of Argentina during 1945 and 1952, María Eva Duarte de Perón, also known as Evita. As she had advanced cancer, Evita had to dictate her last book. The book was finished some days before she died and a fragment read in an act in Plaza de Mayo some days after her death.

== Description ==
The book is a continuation of La Razón de mi Vida, and has 79 pages divided in 30 chapters.
