= Lo que el tiempo nos dejó =

2010 TV miniseries

- Laura Novoa as Eva Perón, in Mi mensaje, the first telefilm of the series
- Genre: Historical fiction
- Created by: Sebastián Ortega
- Directed by: Adrián Caetano; Luis Ortega
- Creative director: Felipe Pigna
- Country of origin: Argentina
- Original language: Spanish
- No. of seasons: 1
- No. of episodes: 6

Production
- Producer: Felipe Pigna

Original release
- Network: Telefe
- Release: September 1 – October 6, 2010

Related
- Algo habrán hecho por la historia argentina

Lo que el tiempo nos dejó (English: What time left us) is a 2010 Argentine TV miniseries of six telefilms about key events of the History of Argentina during the 20th century. They were produced by historian Felipe Pigna. The viewpoint of the stories is not on the events themselves, but on regular people related to them.

== Episodes ==
No. in series	Title	Directed by	Written by	Original release date
1	"Mi mensaje (My Message)"	Adrián Caetano	Marcela Guerty	1 September 2010
2	"La ley primera (The First Law)"	Luis Ortega	Patricio Vega	8 September 2010
3	"La caza del ángel (The Hunt of the Angel)"	Adrián Caetano	Mario Segade	14 September 2010
4	"Te quiero (I Love You)"	Adrián Caetano	Silvina Frejdkes	22 September 2010
5	"Los niños que escriben en el cielo (The Kids that Write from Heaven)"	Adrián Caetano	Patricio Vega	29 September 2010
6	"Un mundo mejor (A Better World)"	Adrián Caetano	Patricio Vega	6 October 2010

== See also ==
- Cultural depictions of Eva Perón
