= Ingeniero Luiggi =

Coordinates: 35°25′S 64°29′W

- Town
- Interactive map of Ingeniero Luiggi
- Country: Argentina
- Province: La Pampa Province
- Time zone: UTC−3 (ART)

Ingeniero Luiggi is a town in La Pampa Province in Argentina.

== Notable natives ==
- Delia Parodi, Argentine politician and the first Argentine woman to hold a prominent elected post
