= Female Peronist Party =

Political party in Argentina

Peronist Women's Party Partido Peronista Femenino
- Abbreviation: PPF
- President: Eva Perón (1949–1952); Delia Parodi (1952–1955)
- Founder: Eva Perón
- Founded: 29 July 1949
- Dissolved: 23 September 1955
- Headquarters: Buenos Aires
- Membership (1951): 1,000,000
- Ideology: Peronism; Social democracy Progressivism; Feminism
- Political position: Left-wing
- National affiliation: Peronist Party
- Colours: Light blue White
- Anthem: "Evita Capitana"

The Female Peronist Party (Spanish: Partido Peronista Femenino, PPF) was an Argentine political party created in 1949 and dissolved in 1955. The party only accepted women and was founded by Eva Perón, who was also the first president of the party.

The PPF was organized and acted as an independent party, autonomous from the male-dominated Peronist Party. It counted with its own political structures and institutions. Under Eva Perón's leadership, the PPF sought to engage women in politics following the expansion of suffrage for women in 1947.

In 1955, following the military coup that ousted Juan Perón from power, the Female Peronist Party was disbanded alongside all other Peronist parties and organisations.

== History ==
After obtaining women's suffrage in 1947, First Lady Eva Duarte de Perón realized that the mere existence of the law did not guarantee the presence of women among candidates with the possibility of being elected. For that reason, in 1949, along with other women who had been politically active since 1945, they decided to found the Female Peronist Party. By 1951, the party had half million members.

Eva had total control over the Female Peronist Party, and its ideology reflect hers. The party serves as the launchpad for her political ambition to become her husband's vice president. The Female Peronist Party organized a campaign together with Argentine trade unions, including the General Confederation of Labour, to have Eva nominated as Juan's running mate in the 1951 presidential election. Her nomination was opposed by conservative section of society, including the military, which regarded a husband-and-wife presidential ticket as concentrating too much power in the hands of the Peróns. Ultimately, Eva increasingly backed away from this ambition because of her declining health.

=== Origins ===
The party, also known as the women's branch or women's party, was created at a meeting held at the Cervantes Theater on 26 July 1949. While run similarly to the men's branch, Eva ran the party completely separated from it. Yet, the party functioned more as a branch and the women in the PPF were placed on Peronist Party lists. Similarly to the Peronist Party, many of its members were working-class emerging leaders.

=== Work ===
The PPF was organized from unidades básicas femeninas ("female basic units") that were formed in neighborhoods and towns, channeling the direct political participation of women in the Peronist movement. During the economic crisis that hit Argentina during the early 1950s, these basic units offered classes in cooking, specifically meatless cuisine and the domestic economy, and also facilitated discussions on the Second Quinquennial Plan, all of which were done by volunteers and free for the general public. Similarly, to help in women to save on clothing, these units (along with the Peronist Association of Housewives) later provided free sewing, kitting and embroidery classes. Already in the 1940s, the PPF had established 3,000 base units and recruited half a million members.

The unidades básicas were based on military units and function to attract new followers, shape a unique Peronist identity, and mobilize party support. By 1951 there were 3,600 unidades básicas femeninas across the entire country. Over time the unidades básicas evolved beyond political purposes and became seen as “second family homes”, as they allowed women to combine their domestic responsibilities with political ones. Mothers could bring their children to the PPF's units for communal upbringing, and the units also organized lessons for literacy, cooking, first aid, sewing, and housekeeping. This became an element of Peronist populism through the inclusion of teaching women economía doméstica ("home economics"), promoting cooperation within marketplace and anti-speculation efforts.

This led to PPF organizing a "crusade against speculators" and reducing wastefulness. Housewives were promoted as "tutelary angels of home economics" that would also be taught how to manage family budgets and develop forms of self-sufficient production through gardens and fashioning clothes. This was displayed as being vital to the national economy as a whole, and though "housewives were depicted as analogous to state planners, employing rational techniques to ensure maximum efficiency in the use of national resources." This coincided with Peronist economic policies, which through boosting working-class incomes allowed an increasingly larger number of families to withdraw women from the workforce and tend to house duties. In 1947, only 1 in 5 women worked a paid job.

Peronism used its power of political mobilization to apply economic planning at the level of home and families, promoting "prioritizing daily expenditures, designing written budgets, and controlling every peso". In line with the Catholic family values of Peronism, the PPF considered the husband to the head of family and allotted him the largest share of disposable income. According to economist Eduardo Elena, Peronist efforts paid off as even while controlling for inflation, the value of deposits and other savings accounts in increased in the Peronist era, and savings occurred even in times of negative real interest rates.

Under PPF, Eva also ran the Ministries of Labour and Health, and successfully championed suffrage for women, with a law allowing all women to vote being passed in 1947. In 1949, women were given the right to equal wages with men, and the new Peronist constitution gave women constitutional guarantees of equality in marriage, granting women equal authority over children. In 1954, a year before Perón was overthrown by the military, the Peronist government also legalized divorce, with the Peronist divorce code strongly favoring female plaintiffs.

Through the PPF's efforts, a large number of women were elected in 1951 to occupy legislative positions: 23 national deputies, the largest number in the western hemisphere, 6 national senators, and 80 in provincial legislators. In the same year the PPF had 500 thousand members and over 3000 basic units. The Female Peronist Party proved effective in organizing grassroots support for Perón, and it organised a "national census of women Peronists", where Eva designated census delegates across Argentina, which would in turn designate their own sub-delegates. These delegates and sub-delegates assisted women in processing their voting papers and detect Peronist sympathies. Eva's mobilization of women for Perón within the PPF was vital for Perón's re-election, and he called the party "so perfect and so complete that in the Argentine political arena, in all our civic tradition, there has never been a more disciplined, virtuous, moral and patriotic force than this group".

=== Eva Peron's Death and Disbanding ===
Following Eva's death in 1952, the party began losing strength and her husband Juan Perón followed her as president of the women's branch. Soon after, Perón gave up the presidency and gave it to congresswoman Delia Parodi. Like every other Perónist organization, it was disbanded by the military junta in 1955, after they overthrew Juan Perón on September 19, 1955 during the Revolución Libertadora.

In 1973, the Montoneros, main representatives of Revolutionary Peronism, created their own female branch based on the Female Peronist Party, Agrupación Evita. However, Agrupación Evita did not advance any kind of feminist cause, as Montoneros instead "insisted on heterosexuality and motherhood even in situations with the looming threat of imprisonment and an overall air of an uncertain future" and advanced explicit social conservatism, decrying abortion and birth control. Political scientist Susanne Meachem argues that the Montoneros' views on women "were as reactionary as those of the ultra-right – a discourse of monogamy, orthodox politics and customs".

== Ideology ==
The Female Peronist Party focused on promoting the rights of women and the poor, and improving the social conditions of the marginalized parts of the Argentine population. It was credited with ensuring the inclusion of the universal suffrage for women in the Peronist constitution, and was a core part of the Peronist movement - it was very independent within the movement, included more than half a million members, and is considered to have significantly raised the electoral dominance of Peronism. It was a part of the tripartite structure of the Peronist Party, with other two branches being the Male Peronist Party and the Labor Union Branch. The Female Peronist Party was Eva's "personal fief, with no party bigwigs allowed to interfere", and her own political views were also the party's.

Evita and her movement was considered to represented left-wing politics within Peronism, and "advanced the combination of nationalism and social democracy that marked the Peronist movement." Although Peronism in itself is considered left-of-centre, the Female Peronist Party was seen as "particularly progressive". The biographer of Juan and Eva Perón, Jill Hedges, notes that Che Guevara and Fidel Castro considered Juan "the leader of an Argentine brand of revolutionary socialism", although she argues that "if there was a leader of an Argentine brand of revolutionary socialism, it was Evita and not her cautious husband". Economically, the Female Peronist Party advocated nationalization and state control programs and further advances to worker rights.

After Evita's death in 1952, the new leader of the party, Delia Parodi, successfully pushed the divorce project by promoting it as part of Evita's feminist plan (although Evita had never mentioned such a law). The divorce law passed, and was hailed as ensuring "the right to happiness in lasting love and a respectable marriage" by Parodi. The law favored women, and a result Argentine divorce rulings between 1952 and 1955 tended to favor female plaintiffs.

Moira Fradinger argued that the Female Peronist Party represented 'modern feminism'. Despite its feminist orientation however, the rhetoric of Eva and her party was described as conservative and traditional regarding its stance on gender roles. In her speeches, Eva often "positioned women as inferior to men and relegated them to their supposed “natural” place in the domestic realm." When commenting on the limited representation of women in the 1951 Argentine election, she remarked: "We are used to sacrifice [on men's behalf], which for us women is the most natural thing in the world." Peronist schoolbooks provided celebrated women's suffrage, but also declared that the political rights and duties of women "should be carried out for the happiness of others", and that "women's concerns were confined mainly to the home, which was their great and irrevocable destiny." Hedges argues that Eva and her movement was "was in no way feminist", and wrote:

Despite Evita’s public career, Perón’s unusual willingness to allow his wife to play such a role and the fact that his government enfranchised women nationally for the first time, it is more than fair to say that neither Perón nor Eva had any real feminist belief as it would normally be understood, nor is it realistic to imagine that they would have in light of their culture, background and experience. (In La razón de mi vida, Eva – or her ghostwriter – refers to feminists as ‘resentful women’ and says, ‘I wasn’t an old spinster, or ugly enough to occupy that kind of role.) However, Evita’s understanding was that women had to have better options in order to avoid being condemned to the type of life her mother had experienced.

Those options were not especially to be found in a career outside the home: both the Peróns, like other Argentine analysts before them, believed that women should be able to remain at home rather than going out to work (where, if anything, they put downward pressure on wages by receiving less pay than men, and tended to ‘masculinise’ themselves, according to Evita). Thus, the solution was to increase men’s wages so that they would be able to provide adequately for their families without a second income.

While Peronism itself is considered to be a combination of "progressive currents from socialism with strong nationalism", Eva and the Female Peronist Party were especially considered to represent the left-wing current of Peronism. In one of her speeches, Eva stated: "I am sectarian, yes, I do not deny it ... Could anyone deny me that right? Could anyone deny to the workers the humble privilege that I am more with them than with their bosses? ... My sectarianism is besides a compensation, a reparation. During a century the privileged were the exploiters of the working class. It is necessary that that be balanced with another century in which the privileged are the workers!" After her death, she was glorified by Peronists as "the strong willed individual woman whose militant anti-oligarchic attitudes endeared her to the masses", and embraced by Revolutionary Peronism and the Montoneros, who became known for slogans such as "If Evita were alive today, she would be a Montonera", arguing that the ultimate goal of Peronism is to bring socialism to Argentina.

== See also ==
- Feminism in Argentina
