= Delia Parodi =

Argentine politician (1913–1991)

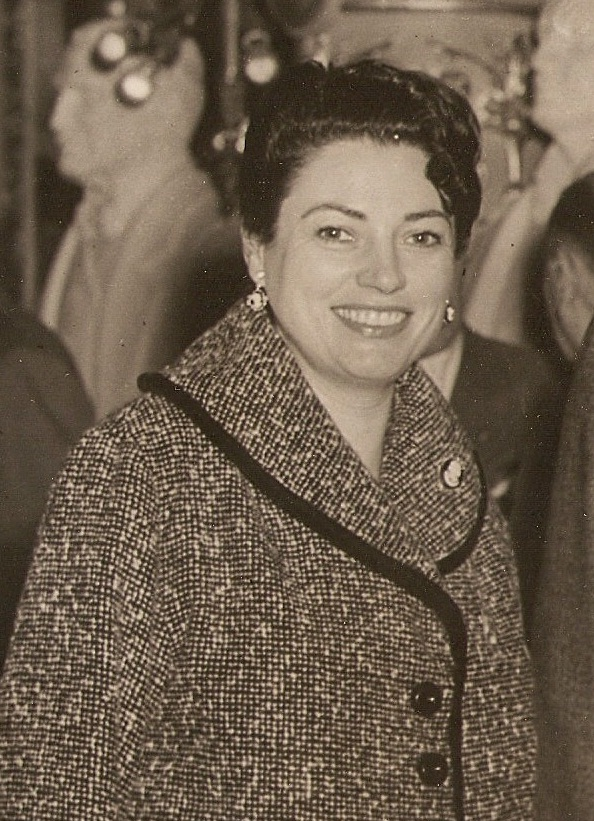

President of the Eva Perón Foundation
- In office 26 July 1952 – 23 September 1955
- Preceded by: Eva Perón
- Succeeded by: Foundation disestablished

President of the Female Peronist Party
- In office 26 July 1952 – 23 September 1955
- Preceded by: Eva Perón
- Succeeded by: Party disestablished

First Vice President of the Chamber of Deputies
- In office 25 April 1953 – 23 September 1955
- Preceded by: Pablo López
- Succeeded by: Enrique Mario Zanni

National Deputy
- In office 4 June 1952 – 23 September 1955
- Constituency: 1st Circunscription of Buenos Aires

Personal details
- Born: 1913 Ingeniero Luiggi, Argentina
- Died: 13 May 1991 (aged 77–78) Buenos Aires, Argentina
- Party: Female Peronist Party; Justicialist Party

Delia Delfina Degliuomini de Parodi (1913 – 1991) was an Argentine politician and the first Argentine woman to hold a prominent elected post.

== Early life ==
Parodi was born to Italian Argentine parents in Ingeniero Luiggi, a small La Pampa Province town, in 1913. Her family relocated to Buenos Aires in 1917 and lived in modest circumstances. She was able to attain secondary education, however, and shortly afterwards met Juan Carlos Parodi.

The couple operated a small business and in 1944, Delia Parodi was hired as a stenographer in the Department of Labor by its new appointee, Colonel Juan Perón. Parodi assisted Perón in his fundraising efforts dealing with the devastating 1944 San Juan earthquake, and became close to Eva Duarte (who would soon be Perón's fiancée and most influential adviser). Following Perón's election to the Presidency in 1946, Parodi was transferred to the Province of San Luis, where she participated as an enumerator during the 1947 Census. The experience earned her a promotion as a local ombudsman in the Las Cañitas section of Palermo (today an upscale ward in Buenos Aires).

== Political career ==
The enactment of female suffrage in Argentina in 1949 and Parodi's neighborhood work earned her a seat in the Argentine Chamber of Deputies in 1951 as one of the first 22 women in Congress. The first woman to make a formal speech in the Argentine Congress, she was active in intellectual property and consumer rights. Following the First Lady's death in 1952, she was elected titular head of the Peronist Women's Party, and represented her country in the Inter-Parliamentary Union. On 25 April 1953, she was unanimously elected First Vice President of the Chamber, becoming the first Argentine Woman to hold an elected leadership position in any branch (she would remain the highest-ranking woman in Argentine Congressional history until the election of Mirian Curletti as First Vice President of the Senate in 2003).

Parodi was imprisoned on Perón's 19 September 1955, overthrow, and she remained in custody until March 1958, shortly after a new election. Pardoned by the newly elected President Arturo Frondizi (who had won with Perón's endorsement), Parodi remained in exile in neighboring Uruguay and separated from her husband; she returned to Argentina in secret to attend her husband's funeral (from which she was forced to flee after police recognized her).

== Later life and death ==
Parodi relocated to Madrid, where Perón had lived since 1961. Undeterred, she helped organize the aging leader's planned return to Argentina in December 1964. Posing as "Delia and Juan Sosa" and sporting Paraguayan passports, she and Perón were intercepted in Rio de Janeiro by Brazilian Intelligence.

The fiasco resulted in an Interpol arrest order against her and her detention in Paris. She remained in contact with Perón, however, and joined his entourage on the leader's June 20, 1973, return to Argentina. Perón died in office a year later, and Parodi's own, worsening health (as well as a violent dictatorship) kept her in a low profile in subsequent years. Following a return to democracy in 1983, she took part in numerous interviews and seminars, and published an autobiography.

Parodi died in Buenos Aires on 13 May 1991, at age 78. Her casket was displayed in Congress' Hall of Lost Steps, and the main press conference room of the Chamber of Deputies was named in her honor in 2003.
