= Evita Museum =

- Museo Evita
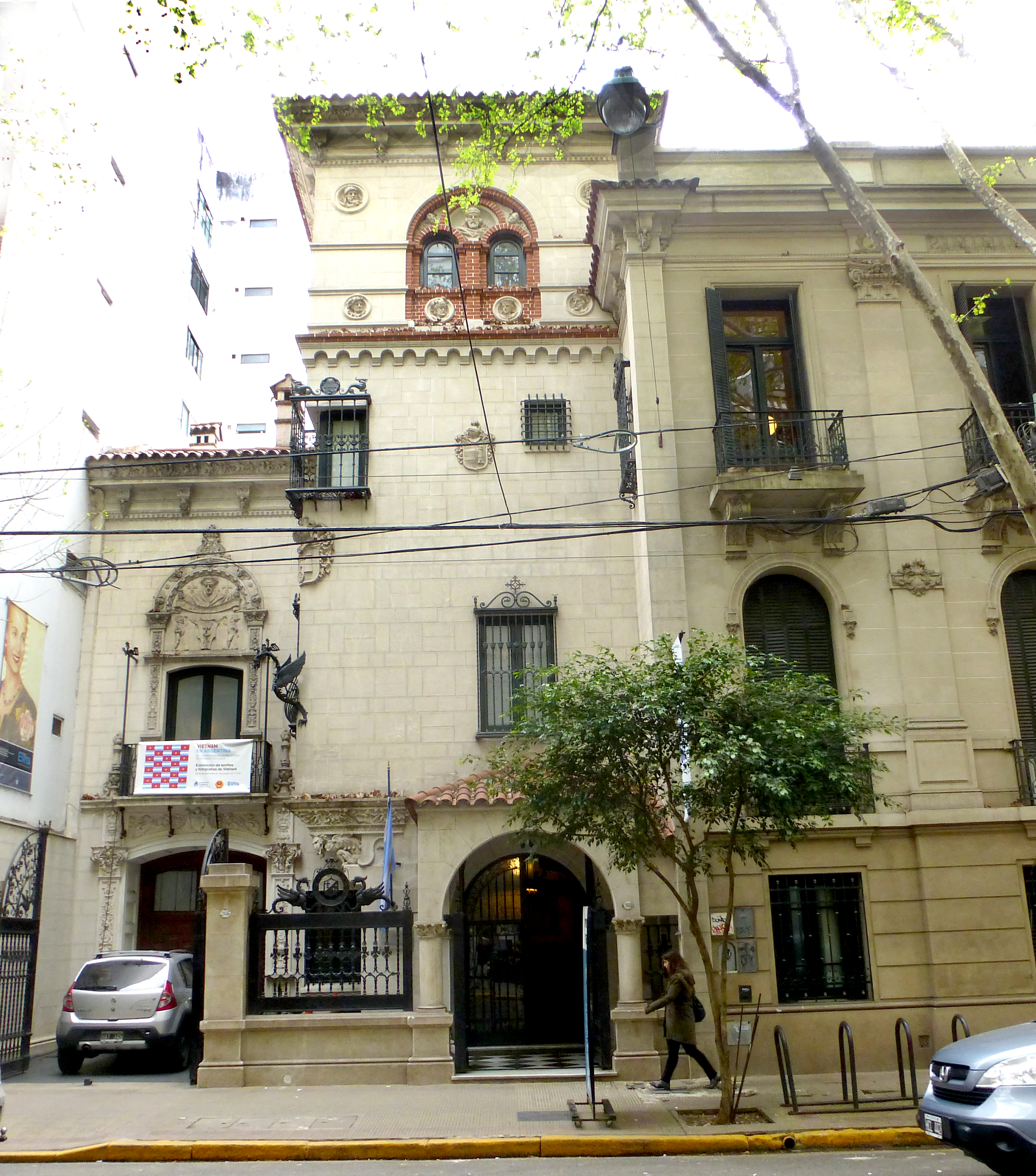
- Main facade of the museum
- Established: 2002; 24 years ago
- Location: Palermo, Buenos Aires
- Coordinates: 34.5806°S 58.4148°W
- Type: History museum
- Website: museoevita.org.ar

The Evita Museum (in Spanish: Museo Evita) is located in the neighborhood of Palermo, Buenos Aires, at 2988 Lafinur Street. It is dedicated to the life and legacy of Eva Duarte de Perón and her work through the Eva Perón Foundation. The museum building also hosts the Eva Perón National Institute of Research, which focuses on academic studies and research about her life and impact.

The building, known as the Carabassa Building, features Spanish Colonial architecture. It was constructed in 1923 and designed by the architect Estanislao Pirovano, who originally intended it as a residence for the Carabassa family, a family of bankers. After 1941, the building began to serve as the headquarters for various charitable organizations. In 1948, the Eva Perón Foundation acquired the property to use it as a shelter for impoverished families temporarily staying in Buenos Aires, replicating similar facilities established throughout Argentina. The institution was closed in 1955 following the Revolución Libertadora, and since then, the Argentine state has used the building for various purposes.

In the 1990s, a movement began to create a museum dedicated to Eva Perón in the building. In 1998, renovation works were initiated as part of an initiative by President Carlos Menem, who also declared the site a Historical Landmark of Argentina. In 1999, he signed the decree establishing the Eva Perón National Institute. On 26 July 2002, coinciding with the 50th anniversary of Eva Perón's death, the museum was formally inaugurated.

== Collection ==
The museum is designed to recreate how the house appeared when it was used by the Eva Perón Foundation as a shelter for people in transit through Buenos Aires, especially pregnant women who needed medical care in the city. The collection also includes garments worn by Eva Perón during her time as First Lady of Argentina, featuring designs by Christian Dior and Paco Jamandreu.

The first room is dedicated to her childhood in Los Toldos, followed by exhibits on her early career as an actress and her first encounter with Juan Domingo Perón, including their private correspondence. The subsequent rooms focus on her political role as First Lady and the social programs led by her foundation for children and the underprivileged. Visitors can also see Peronist propaganda and, above all, displays highlighting her advocacy for women's suffrage in Argentina. The most iconic item on display is her national ID card — the first ever issued to a woman in Argentina — which she used to cast her vote under the newly established female suffrage law while she was ill in hospital.

The facilities of the museum include a gift shop, a conference room, and a restaurant.
