= Eva Perón: The True Story =

1996 film

- Still of the film: Juan Perón (Víctor Laplace) holds a weakened Eva Perón (Esther Goris), resembling the real Evita's last speech.
- Directed by: Juan Carlos Desanzo
- Written by: José Pablo Feinmann
- Produced by: Hugo E. Lauría; María de la Paz Marino
- Starring: Esther Goris; Víctor Laplace
- Cinematography: Juan Carlos Lenardi
- Edited by: Sergio Zottola
- Music by: José Luis Castiñeira de Dios
- Distributed by: Líder Films; David Lamping
- Release date: 24 October 1996
- Running time: 114 minutes
- Country: Argentina
- Language: Spanish
- Budget: US$3 million

Eva Perón: The True Story, also known simply as Eva Perón, is a 1996 Argentine historical-biographical drama film directed by Juan Carlos Desanzo and starring Esther Goris and Víctor Laplace. It was written by José Pablo Feinmann, based on the life of Eva Perón. It was released on 24 October 1996, and won 3 "Cóndor" awards by the Argentine Film Critics Association in 1997, including Best Original Screenplay and Best Actress for Goris.

The film was selected as the Argentine entry for the Best Foreign Language Film at the 69th Academy Awards, but was not accepted as a nominee.

== Plot ==
The narration does not follow a chronologically linear interpretation of the full life of Eva Perón. Instead, it focuses on the political disputes during the last year of Eva's life. These disputes involved women's suffrage in Argentina, failed coup attempts against the Peronist government, and Eva's failed bid for the vice presidency. The story concludes with Eva's death in 1952.

== Cast ==
- Esther Goris as Eva Perón
- Víctor Laplace as Juan Domingo Perón
- Cristina Banegas (Juana Ibarguren, Evita's mother)
- Pepe Novoa as Gral. Franklin Lucero
- Irma Córdoba as Mercedes Ortiz de Achával Junco
- Lorenzo Quinteros as Gral. Eduardo Lonardi
- Tony Vilas as Gral. Edelmiro Farrell
- Jorge Petraglia (Bishop)
- Enrique Liporace as Raúl Apold
- Tony Lestingi as Alejandro Achával Junco
- Leandro Regúnaga as José Espejo
- Fernando Sureda as Armando Cabo
- Danilo Devizia as Enrique Santos Discépolo
- Carlos Roffé (Gral. Ángel Solari)
- Jean Pierre Reguerraz (Gral. Benjamín Menéndez)
- Miguel Tarditti as Américo Ghioldi
- Francisco Nápoli as Arturo Frondizi
- Horacio Roca as Paco Jamandreu
- Regina Lamm as Guillermina Bunge de Moreno
- Ariel Bonomi as Julio Álvarez
- Luis Herrera as John William Cooke
- Joselo Bella as Hernán Benítez
- Eduardo Ruderman as Héctor Cámpora
- Ramón Acuña as Presidential chauffeur
- Fernando Álvarez as Senior worker
- Mario Barreiro as Peronist worker
- Hugo Álvarez as Socialist worker
- Lindor Bressan as Casa Rosada military man
- Raúl Florido as Casa Rosada military man
- Inés Flomenbaum as Nurse
- Pedro Mansilla as Radio drama actor
- Ernesto Catalán as Radio drama sound engineer
- Manuel Rosón as Wake ceremony man
- Florencia Sztajn as Evita as a child
- Darío Contartesi as Juan Duarte as a child
- Carla Damico as Blanca Duarte
- Gabriela López as Elisa Duarte
- Jorge García Marino as Minister
- Luis Mazzeo as Military officer in a jeep
- Jovita Dieguez as Woman Foundation
- Inés Rey as Old woman at health institution
- Martín Coria as Printing house worker
- Nora Mercado as Woman on radio
- Pablo Carnaghi as Florencio Soto
- Julio Pozueta as Isaías Santín
- Enrique Flynn as Wake ceremony young man
- Javier Faur
- Valeria Lorca
- Rosa Albina Ibáñez
- Adriana Pérez Gianny
- Roberto Fratantoni

== Reception ==
Lisa Alspector of the Chicago Reader favoured Goris' "riveting" portrayal of Evita over that of Madonna in the American film, Evita (1996), based on the musical. Alspectot described the Argentine film as "an effective character study with plenty of subtext." She also stated that "it's fascinating to watch Goris and Victor Laplace (as Juan Peron) demystify sensationalized figures." She praised the greater emphasis on politics rather than Eva's brief acting career and felt the title character engaged viewers so that "you're compelled to ponder her complex motivations throughout."

== Awards and nominations ==
Argentine Film Critics Association Awards

- Best Actress (Mejor Actriz) – Esther Goris (WON)
- Best Art Direction (Mejor Dirección Artística) – Miguel Ángel Lumaldo (WON)
- Best Screenplay, Original (Mejor Guión Original – José Pablo Feinmann (WON)
- Best Cinematography (Mejor Fotografía) – Juan Carlos Lenardi (nomination)
- Best Director (Mejor Director) – Juan Carlos Desanzo (nomination)
- Best Film (Mejor Película) – (nomination)
- Best Music (Mejor Música) – José Luis Castiñeira de Dios (nomination)

Biarritz International Festival of Latin American Cinema

- Audience Award – Juan Carlos Desanzo (nomination)

== See also ==
- List of submissions to the 69th Academy Awards for Best Foreign Language Film
- List of Argentine submissions for the Academy Award for Best Foreign Language Film
