= The Woman with the Whip =

1952 Biography of Eva Duarte de Peron

- Cover of The Woman with the Whip as it appeared upon publication in 1952
- Author: Mary Main
- Language: English
- Subject: Biography; History; Politics; Journalism
- Genre: Biography
- Publisher: Corgi Publishing
- Publication date: 1952
- Publication place: United States
- Media type: Print
- ISBN: 0552106453

The Woman with the Whip is a 1952 biography of political leader and cultural icon Eva Perón, written by Argentinian author Mary Main. First published in England and the United States shortly after Eva Perón's death, it presents her in a highly critical light, and is often dismissed by Perón supporters as lacking in historical value. However, the book was extremely popular, and remains highly regarded by academics as a valuable work of journalism. The Woman with the Whip served as source for Andrew Lloyd Webber's musical Evita.

This book was at first not published in Argentina, because Juan Perón, Eva Perón's husband, was head of state at the time. During his regime, freedom of speech was suppressed and critics were often jailed. The author, Mary Main, used the pseudonym "María Flores" in the initial publication. The book was published with Mary Main's true name only after Perón's overthrow in 1955.

Mary Main was born in a suburb of Buenos Aires in 1903. Her parents were British and she was educated at English boarding schools. Her early married life was spent living in construction camps in the more primitive parts of Argentina. At the beginning of the Second World War she went to live in the United States, eventually moving to Connecticut. She returned to Buenos Aires to write The Woman with the Whip. She conducted her research and interviews covertly, citing strong government repression and fear for her life.

Marysa Navarro, another of Eva's biographers and author of Evita, is critical of Mary Main's book, claiming that she ignored the political, social, and economic background of the period.
