= Esther Goris =

Argentine actress

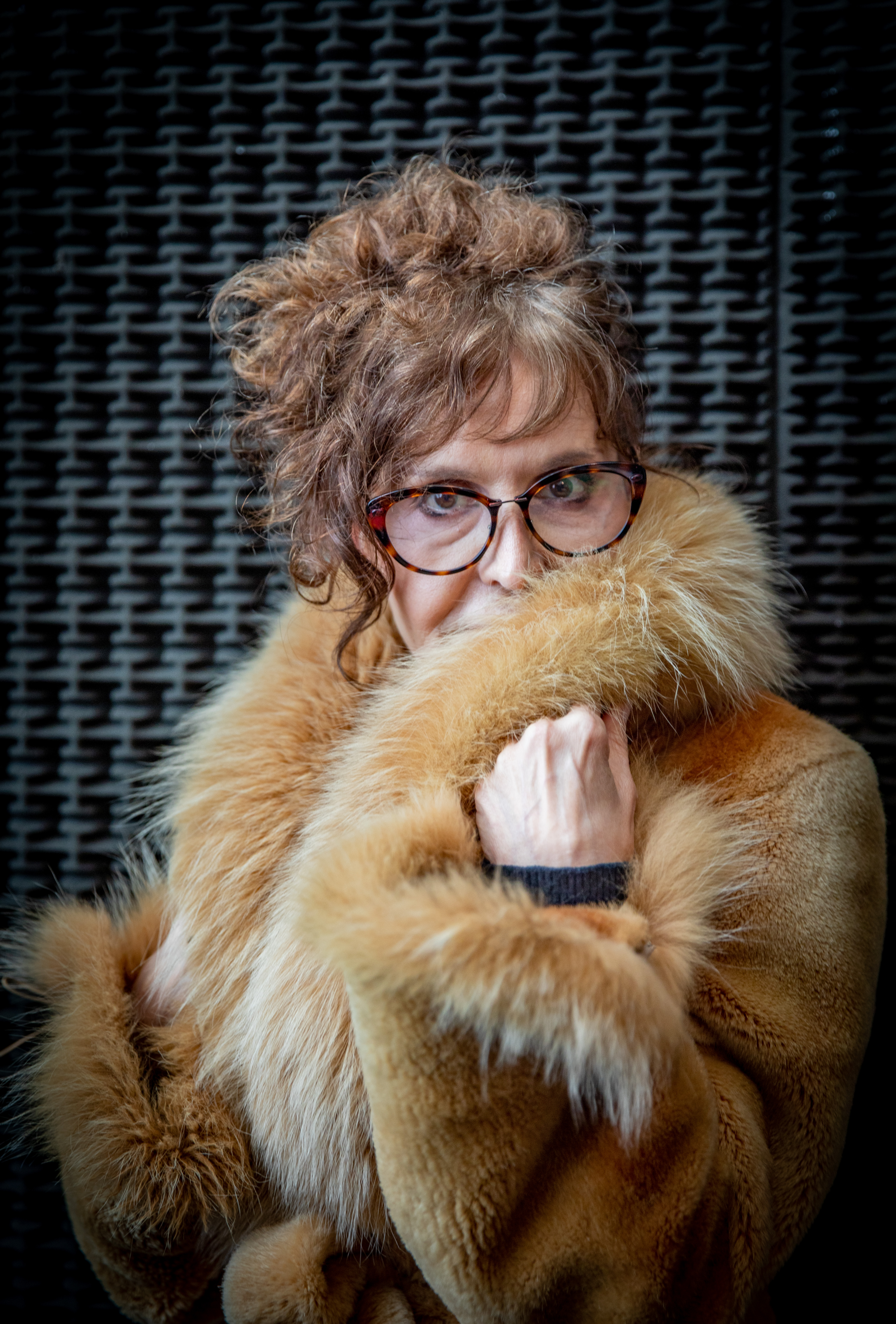
- Goris in 2022.
- Born: María Esther Goris; 5 March 1960 (age 66); Buenos Aires, Argentina
- Education: University of Buenos Aires
- Occupation: Actress
- Years active: 1982–present

María Esther Goris (born 5 March 1960) is an Argentine actress. Her film career started in 1983 with Los enemigos and Gracias por el fuego (Thanks for the Fire, based on Mario Benedetti's homonymous novel). In 1996, she starred in Eva Perón: The True Story as Evita during the last year of her life, with Víctor Laplace as Juan Perón.

== Early life ==
Goris was born in Buenos Aires to Galician parents from Vila de Cruces and A Estrada, Pontevedra. They met in Galicia and emigrated to Argentina in 1950 and 1951, respectively. While working in the fields, her father contracted tuberculosis and was hospitalized for 14 months at Hospital Muñiz. Her parents got married on, 19 November 1954, the same day he was discharged from the hospital. They lived in Monte Grande, but when Goris was three, they moved to Banfield, where she spent the rest of her childhood. She graduated from the Faculty of Philosophy and Letters at the University of Buenos Aires.

== Career ==
Goris has appeared in several TV series and mini-series, the last ones in 2004: Epitafios and El Deseo (The Desire).
