= La razón de mi vida =

Autobiography of Eva Perón

- Book cover, first edition
- Author: Eva Perón
- Language: Castilian Spanish
- Publisher: Peuser
- Publication date: 1951

La Razón de mi vida (literal translation: "The Reason for My Life") is the autobiography of Eva Perón, First Lady of Argentina from 1946 until her death in 1952. The book was published in 1951 shortly before Eva's death, and is considered a propagandistic piece for Peronism, the political movement her husband, Juan Perón, started. The book explains how things such as class differences, labor rights, gender roles, and unions work in a Peronist world. In 1952, after her death, the book became required reading for government employees.

It has been published in English under the titles My Mission in Life, and Evita by Evita.

== Authorship ==
Despite being credited to Eva Perón, much of the writing of the book was not done by her. In 1950, Spanish journalist Manuel Penella da Silva was hired to work on a memoir for Eva. At the end of that year, a completed manuscript of what would eventually become La Razón de Mi Vida was presented to Juan Perón and other members of his administration for review. It was disliked by those who read it, for reasons including the fact the language used was more consistent with the Spanish dialect in Spain than in Argentina. Juan Perón gave the manuscript to Raúl Menda, one of his speechwriters. The manuscript was heavily reworked, removing things such as a chapter of feminist analysis of Eva and her political contributions. The final version produced by these revisions is the version of the book seen today. Due to the high involvement of the Peron regime in its creation, many historians consider the book a work of propaganda more than an accurate account of Eva Perón's life.

== Content and themes ==
Despite being an autobiography, the book's focus often strays from Eva Perón herself. For example, the book contains little information about Eva's life before she met her husband, Juan Perón. Once Juan Perón is introduced into the narrative, the book simultaneously aggrandizes Eva and minimizes her to being Juan's shadow.

The book describes how Evita became aware of class differences and struggles as a child. It repeated ideas and messages Eva often spoke of in her speeches and expanded on Peronism. Throughout the book, Juan Perón is characterized as the ideal Argentinian man, leader, and father, and Eva as the ideal woman, follower, and mother.

The style of the book is casual and personal. It is set in present tense, a deviation from the expected norms of autobiographies. It mimics the way Eva would speak while delivering speeches, and is arguably an extension of her public persona.

== Literary context ==
Before the publication of La Razón in 1951, autobiography as a genre in Argentina was almost entirely dominated by upper-class men. Eva Perón, as a lower-class woman born of an extra-marital affair and an ex-actress, represented a deviation from the genre's established norms.

== Publication history ==
In English, the book has been published under a couple different names. In 1953, it was translated by Ethel Cherry and published under the title My Mission in Life, and in 1980 it was published under the title Evita by Evita.

The book has also been translated into German, French, and many other languages.
