= Eva Perón =

First Lady of Argentina from 1946 to 1952

Spiritual Leader of the Nation Eva Perón
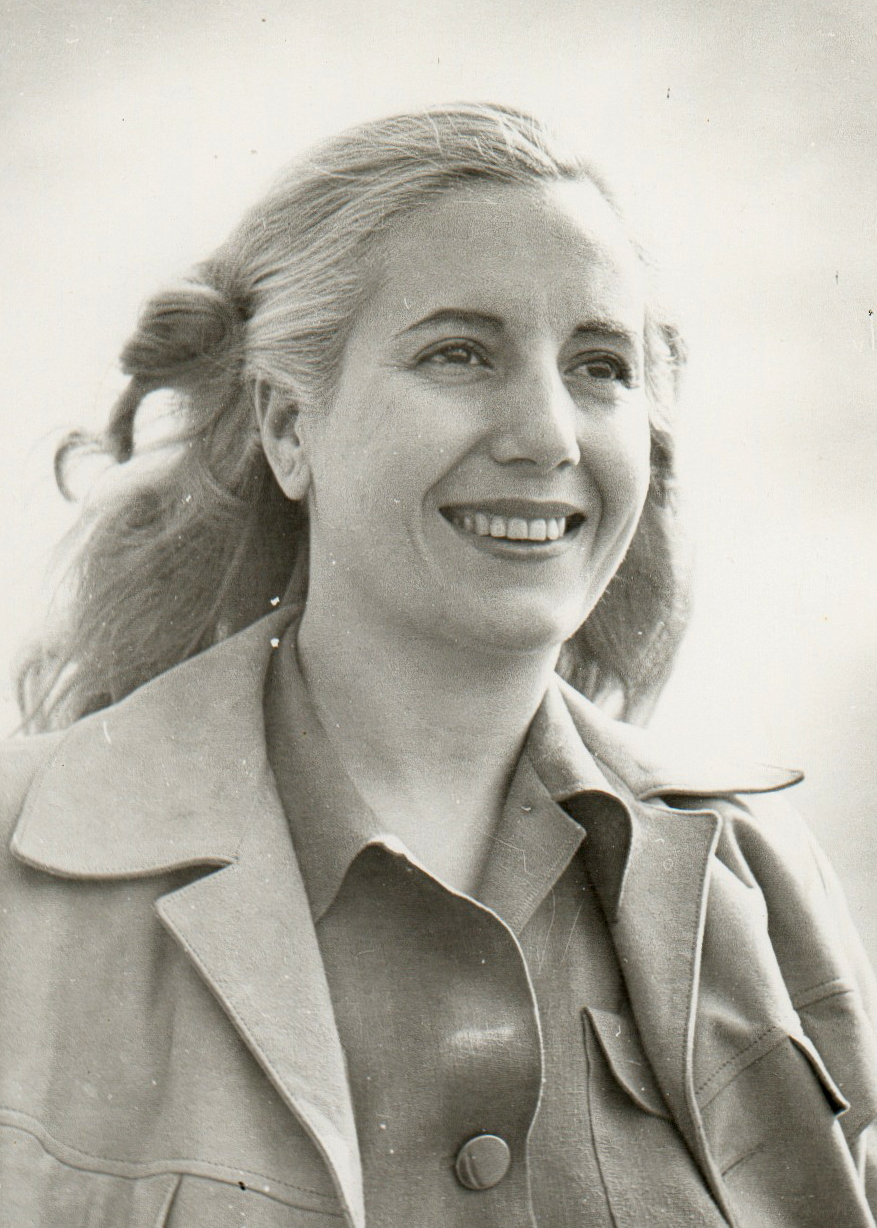
- Perón in 1948

First Lady of Argentina
- In role 4 June 1946 – 26 July 1952
- President: Juan Perón
- Preceded by: Conrada Victoria Farrell
- Succeeded by: Mercedes Lonardi (1955)

President of the Eva Perón Foundation
- In office 8 July 1948 – 26 July 1952
- Preceded by: Position established
- Succeeded by: Delia Parodi

President of the Female Peronist Party
- In office 29 July 1949 – 26 July 1952
- Preceded by: Position established
- Succeeded by: Delia Parodi

Personal details
- Born: María Eva Duarte; 7 May 1919 Junín or rural area of the General Viamonte municipality, Buenos Aires province, Argentina
- Died: 26 July 1952 (aged 33) Unzué Palace, Buenos Aires, Argentina
- Resting place: La Recoleta Cemetery
- Party: Justicialist Party; Female Peronist Party
- Spouse: Juan Perón (m. 1945)
- Eva Perón's voice Eva Perón's voice Eva Perón's "Resignation speech" Recorded 1951

María Eva Duarte de Perón (Spanish pronunciation: [maˈɾia ˈeβa ˈðwarte ðe peˈɾon]; née Duarte; 7 May 1919 – 26 July 1952), better known as Eva "Evita" Perón, was an Argentine politician, activist, and actress who served as First Lady of Argentina from June 1946 until her death in July 1952, as the wife of Argentine President Juan Perón. She was born into poverty in the rural village of Los Toldos, in the Pampas, as the youngest of five children. In 1934, at age 15, she moved to Buenos Aires to pursue a career as a stage, radio, and film actress. She married Perón in 1945, when he was still an army colonel, and was propelled onto the political stage when he became President of Argentina. She became a central figure of Peronism and Argentine culture because of the Eva Perón Foundation, a charitable organization perceived by many Argentinians as highly impactful.

She met Colonel Juan Perón on 22 January 1944 during a charity event at the Luna Park Stadium to benefit the victims of an earthquake in San Juan, Argentina. The two were married the following year. When Perón became president, Eva Perón became powerful within the pro-Peronist trade unions, primarily for speaking on behalf of labor rights. She ran the Ministries of Labor and Health, founded and ran the Eva Perón Foundation, championed women's suffrage in Argentina, and founded and ran the nation's first large-scale female political party, the Female Peronist Party.

In 1951, Eva Perón announced her candidacy for the Peronist nomination for the office of Vice President of Argentina, receiving great support from the Peronist political base, low-income and working-class Argentines who were referred to as descamisados or "shirtless ones" (similar to the term sans-culottes during the French Revolution). Opposition from the military and bourgeoisie, coupled with her declining health, ultimately forced her to withdraw her candidacy. In 1952, shortly before her death from cancer at 33, she was given the title of "Spiritual Leader of the Nation of Argentina" by the Argentine Congress. She was given a state funeral upon her death, a prerogative generally reserved for heads of state.

Perón has become a part of international popular culture, most famously as the subject of the musical Evita (1976). Cristina Álvarez Rodríguez has said that Perón has never left the collective consciousness of Argentines. Cristina Fernández de Kirchner, the second female president of Argentina, claims that women of her generation owe a debt to Perón for "her example of passion and combativeness". Immediately after her death, mourners flocked to Buenos Aires on self-styled pilgrimages, and the city and sites associated with her have continued to attract pilgrims ever since.

== Early life ==
=== Early childhood ===
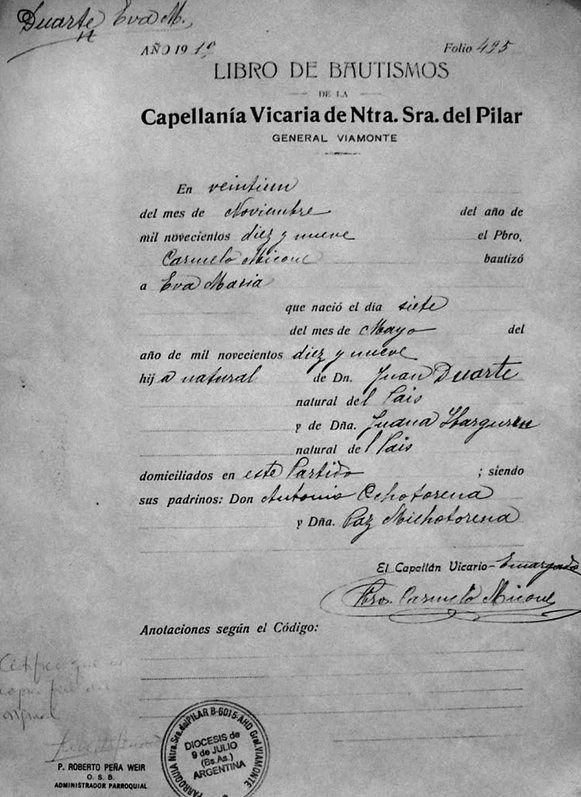
Eva Perón's baptismal act, dated 21 November 1919

Perón's 1951 biography, La Razón de mi Vida, contains no dates or references to childhood occurrences and does not list the location of her birth or her name at birth. According to Junín's civil registry, a birth certificate shows that one María Eva Duarte was born on May 7, 1922. Her baptismal certificate lists her date of birth as May 7, 1919, under the name Eva María Ibarguren. It is thought that in 1945 Perón created a forgery of her birth certificate for her marriage.

Perón spent her childhood in Junín. Her father, Juan Duarte Manechena Etchegoyen (1872–1926), was descended from French Basque immigrants. Her mother, Juana Ibarguren Nuñez (1894–1971), was descended from Spanish Basque immigrants. Juan Duarte, a wealthy rancher from nearby Chivilcoy, already had a wife Adela D'Uhart Hiriboronde and eleven children there. At that time in rural Argentina, it was not uncommon for a wealthy man to have several families.

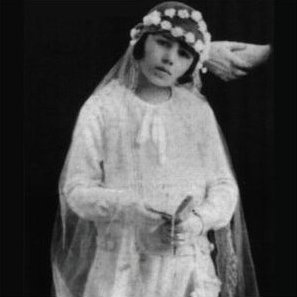
Eva Duarte at her First Holy Communion, 1926

When Perón was one year old, Duarte returned permanently to his legal family, leaving Juana Ibarguren and her children in abject poverty. They were forced to move to the poorest area of Junín. Los Toldos was a village in the dusty region of Las Pampas, with a reputation as a desolate place of poverty. To support herself and her children, Ibarguren sewed clothes for neighbours. The family was stigmatized by the abandonment by the father and by the illegitimate status of the children under Argentine law, and was consequently somewhat isolated. A desire to expunge this part of her life might have been a motivation for Perón to arrange the destruction of her original birth certificate in 1945.

When Duarte suddenly died and Ibarguren and their children sought to attend his funeral, there was conflict. Although Ibarguren and the children were permitted to enter and pay their respects, they were promptly directed out of the church. Duarte's widow did not want her late husband's mistress and children at the funeral. As she was the legitimate wife, her orders were respected.

=== Junín ===
Before he abandoned Juana Ibarguren, Duarte had been her sole means of support. Biographer John Barnes writes that, after this abandonment, all Duarte left to the family was a document declaring that the children were his, thus enabling them to use the Duarte surname. Soon after, Juana moved her children to a one-room apartment in Junín. To pay the rent on their single-roomed home, mother and daughters took up jobs as cooks in the houses of the local estancias.

Eventually, owing to Eva's older brother's financial help, the family moved into a bigger house, which they later transformed into a boarding house. During this time, young Eva often participated in school plays and concerts. One of her favourite pastimes was the cinema. Though Eva's mother wanted to marry her off to one of the local bachelors, Eva dreamed of becoming a famous actress. Eva's love for acting was reinforced in October 1933, when she played a small role in a school play called Arriba Estudiantes (Students Arise), which Barnes describes as "an emotional, patriotic, flag-waving melodrama". After the play, Eva was determined to become an actress.

=== Move to Buenos Aires ===
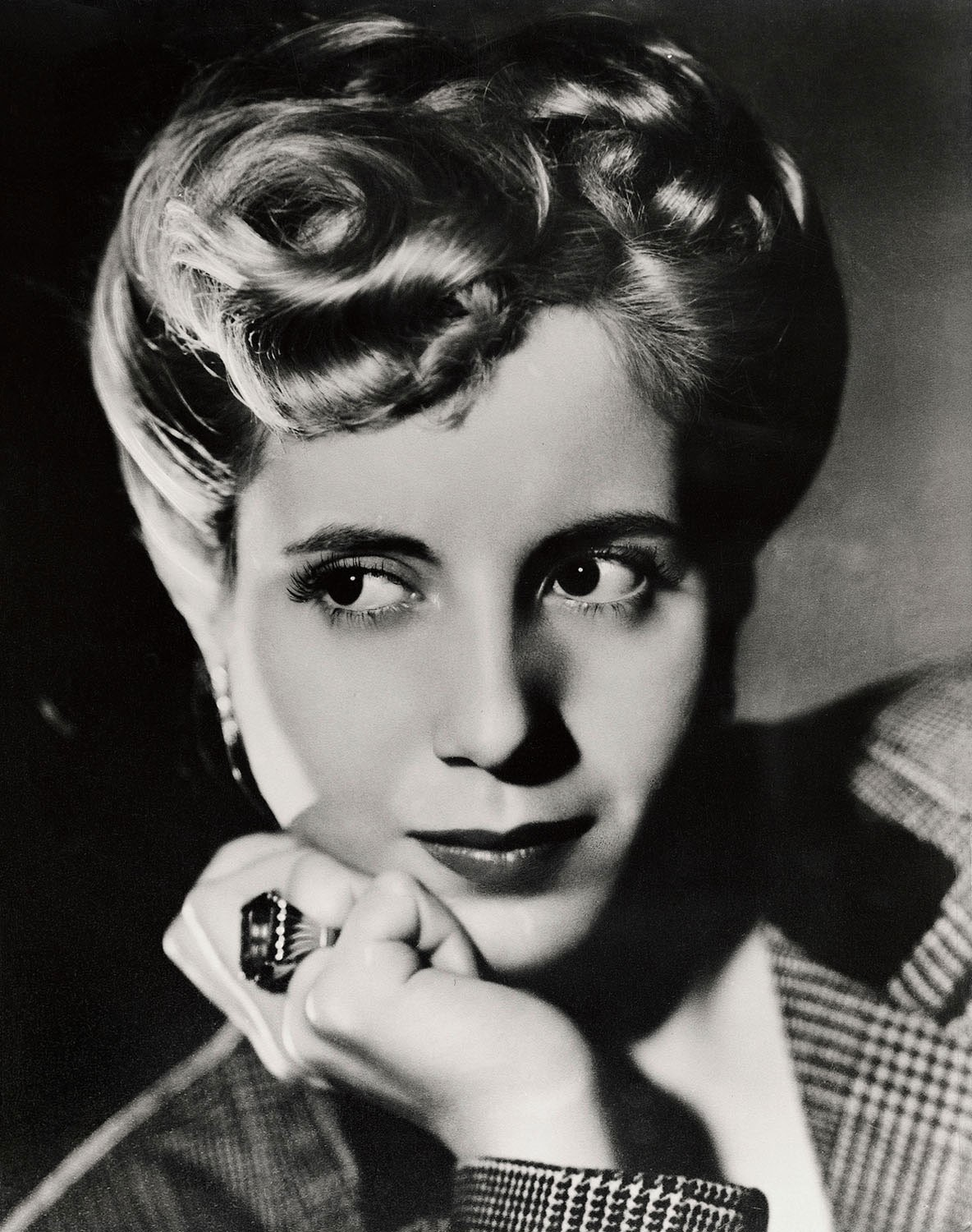
Eva Duarte in 1944 at age 25, photographed by Annemarie Heinrich

In her autobiography, Perón explains that all the people from her town who had been to the big cities described them as "marvellous places, where nothing was given but wealth". In 1934, at 15, Perón escaped her poverty-stricken village when she ran off with a young musician to Buenos Aires. The couple's relationship ended quickly, but Perón remained in Buenos Aires. She began to pursue jobs on the stage and the radio, and she eventually became a film actress. She bleached her naturally black hair blonde, a look she maintained for the rest of her life.

It is often reported that Perón travelled to Buenos Aires by train with tango singer Agustín Magaldi. However, there is no record of the married Magaldi performing in Junín in 1934 (and even if he had done so, he usually travelled with his wife). Perón's sisters maintain that Perón travelled to Buenos Aires with their mother. The sisters also claim that Doña Juana accompanied her daughter to an audition at a radio station and arranged for Perón to live with the Bustamante family, who were friends of the Duarte family. While the method of her escape from her bleak provincial surroundings is debated, she did begin a new life in Buenos Aires.

Buenos Aires in the 1930s was known as the "Paris of South America". The centre of the city had many cafés, restaurants, theatres, movie houses, shops, and bustling crowds. In direct contrast, the 1930s were also years of great unemployment, poverty, and hunger in the capital, and many new arrivals from the interior were forced to live in tenements, boardinghouses and in outlying shanties that became known as villas miserias.

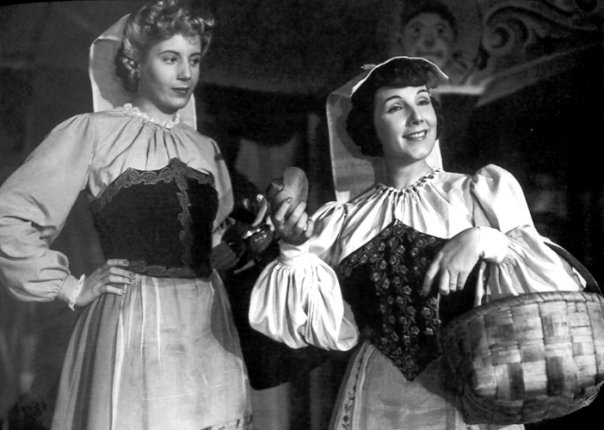
Eva Duarte and Libertad Lamarque in La Cabalgata del Circo, 1945

Upon arrival in Buenos Aires, Eva Duarte was faced with the difficulties of surviving without formal education or connections. The city was especially overcrowded during this period because of the migrations caused by the Great Depression. On 28 March 1935, she made her professional debut in the play Mrs. Perez (la Señora de Pérez), at the Comedias Theater.

In 1936, Duarte toured nationally with a theatre company, worked as a model, and was cast in a few B-grade movie melodramas. In 1942, she experienced some economic stability when a company called Candilejas (sponsored by a soap manufacturer) hired her for a daily role in radio drama Muy Bien, which aired on Radio El Mundo (World Radio), the most important radio station in the country at that time. Later that year, she signed a five-year contract with Radio Belgrano, which assured her a role in the popular historical-drama program Great Women of History, in which she plays Elizabeth I of England, Sarah Bernhardt, and Alexandra Feodorovna, the last Tsarina of Russia. Eventually, Duarte came to co-own the radio company. By 1943, she was earning five or six thousand pesos per month, making her one of the highest-paid radio actresses in the nation. Pablo Raccioppi, who jointly ran Radio El Mundo, is said to have not liked her but to have noted that she was "thoroughly dependable". Duarte also had a short-lived film career during the Golden Age of Argentine cinema, but none of the films in which she appears were hugely successful. In one of her last films, La cabalgata del circo (The Circus Cavalcade), she plays a young country girl who rivals an older woman, the movie's star, Libertad Lamarque.

As a result of her success with radio dramas and films, Duarte achieved some financial stability. In 1942, she was able to move into an apartment in the exclusive neighbourhood of Recoleta, on 1557 Calle Posadas (currently the site of the Hotel Melia Recoleta Plaza). The next year, she began her career in politics as one of the founders of the Argentine Radio Syndicate.

== Early relationship with Juan Perón ==
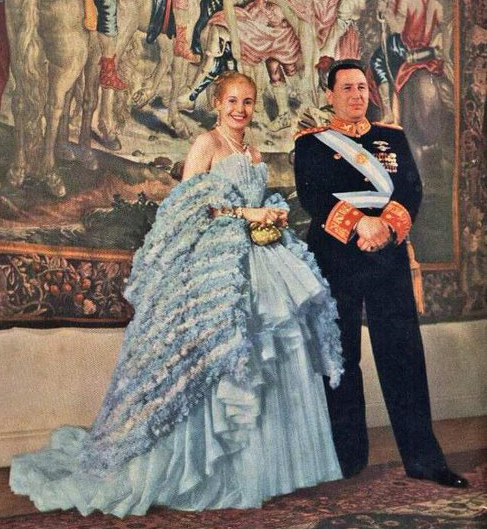
Eva and Juan Perón in 1947

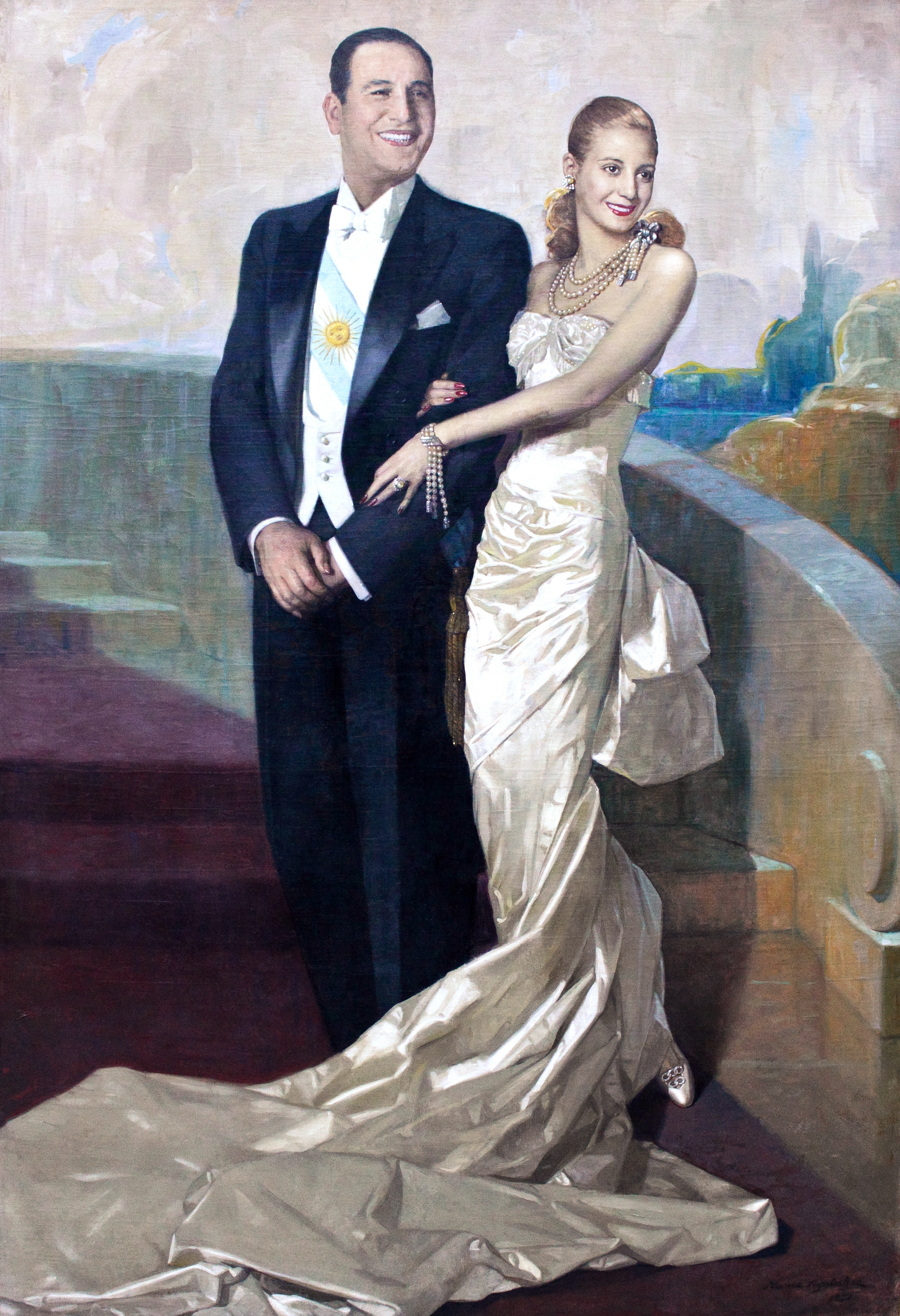
Official portrait of Juan Domingo Perón and Eva Perón, by Numa Ayrinhac in 1948. He is the only Argentine President to be accompanied by the First Lady in an official portrait.

On 15 January 1944, an earthquake occurred in San Juan, Argentina, killing ten thousand people. In response, Secretary of Labor Juan Perón established a fund to raise money to aid the victims. He devised a plan to have an "artistic festival" as a fundraiser and invited radio and film actors to participate. After a week of fundraising, all participants met at a gala held at Luna Park Stadium in Buenos Aires on 22 January 1944, to benefit earthquake victims.

At this gala, Duarte first met Perón and promptly became Perón's girlfriend. She referred to the day she met him as her "marvellous day". They left the gala together at around two in the morning.

Duarte had no knowledge of or interest in politics prior to meeting Perón; therefore, she never argued with Perón or any of his inner circle but merely absorbed what she heard. Perón later claims in his memoir that he purposefully selected Eva as his pupil, and set out to create in her a "second I". Perón may have allowed her such intimate exposure and knowledge of his inner circle because of his age: he was 48 and she was 24 when they met. He had come to politics late in life and was therefore free of preconceived ideas of how his political career should be conducted, and he was willing to accept whatever aid she offered him.

In May 1944, it was announced that broadcast performers must organize themselves into a union and that this union would be the only one permitted to operate in Argentina. Shortly after the formation of the union, Duarte was elected its president. Perón had made the suggestion that performers create a union, and the other performers likely felt it was good politics to elect his mistress. Shortly after her election as president of the union, Duarte began a daily program called Toward a Better Future, which dramatized, in soap opera form, the accomplishments of Perón. Often, Perón's own speeches were played during the program. When she spoke, Duarte spoke in ordinary language as a regular woman, perhaps because she wanted listeners to believe what she herself believed about Perón.

== Rise to power ==
=== Juan Perón's arrest ===
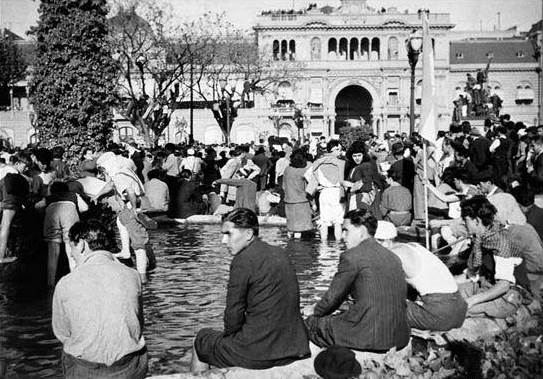
Demonstration for Perón's release, on 17 October 1945. The Casa Rosada is seen in the background.

By the early 1940s, a group of Army officers called the GOU for "Grupo de Oficiales Unidos" (United Officers' Group), nicknamed "The Colonels", had gained considerable influence within the Argentine government. President Pedro Pablo Ramírez became wary of Perón's growing power within the government and was unable to curb that power. On 24 February 1944, Ramírez signed his own resignation paper, which was drafted by Perón; Edelmiro Julián Farrell, a friend of Perón, became president, and Perón returned to his job as labor minister, at which point he was the most powerful man in the Argentine government. On 9 October 1945, Perón was arrested by his opponents within the government who feared that, with the strong support of his base, largely unskilled unionized workers that had recently moved from rural areas to industrialized urban centres and several allied trade unions, Perón would attempt a power grab.

Six days later, between 250,000 and 350,000 people gathered in front of the Casa Rosada, Argentina's government house, to demand Perón's release. At 11 pm, Perón stepped onto the balcony of the Casa Rosada and addressed the crowd. Biographer Robert D. Crassweller claims that this moment was particularly powerful because it dramatically recalled important aspects of Argentine history. Crassweller writes that Perón enacted the role of a caudillo addressing his people in the tradition of Argentine leaders Juan Manuel de Rosas and Hipólito Yrigoyen. Crassweller also claims that the evening contained "mystic overtones" of a "quasi-religious" nature.

On 18 October, one day after he was released, Perón married Eva discreetly in a civil ceremony in Junín. A church wedding was held on 9 December 1945 in La Plata. In the modern day, 17 October is still celebrated as a holiday by the Justicialist Party (celebrated as Día de la Lealtad, or "Loyalty Day").

=== 1946 presidential election ===
After his release from prison, Perón decided to campaign for the presidency of the nation, which he won with 54%. Eva Perón campaigned heavily for her husband during his 1946 presidential bid. Using her weekly radio show, she delivered speeches with populist rhetoric urging the poor to align themselves with Juan Perón's movement.

After Perón won the election, his administration started circulating a highly fictionalized version of the 17 October demonstration where Eva was portrayed as knocking on every door in Buenos Aires in order to bring out people to the street. This version of events was popularized in the movie version of the Lloyd Webber musical; historians agree that this version of events is false. At the time of Perón's imprisonment, Eva was solely an actress; she had no political influence with any of the various labor unions, and she was not well liked within Perón's inner circle, nor was she particularly popular within the film and radio business. The rally that freed Perón from prison was organized by various unions, particularly the CGT, which was Perón's main base.

== European tour ==
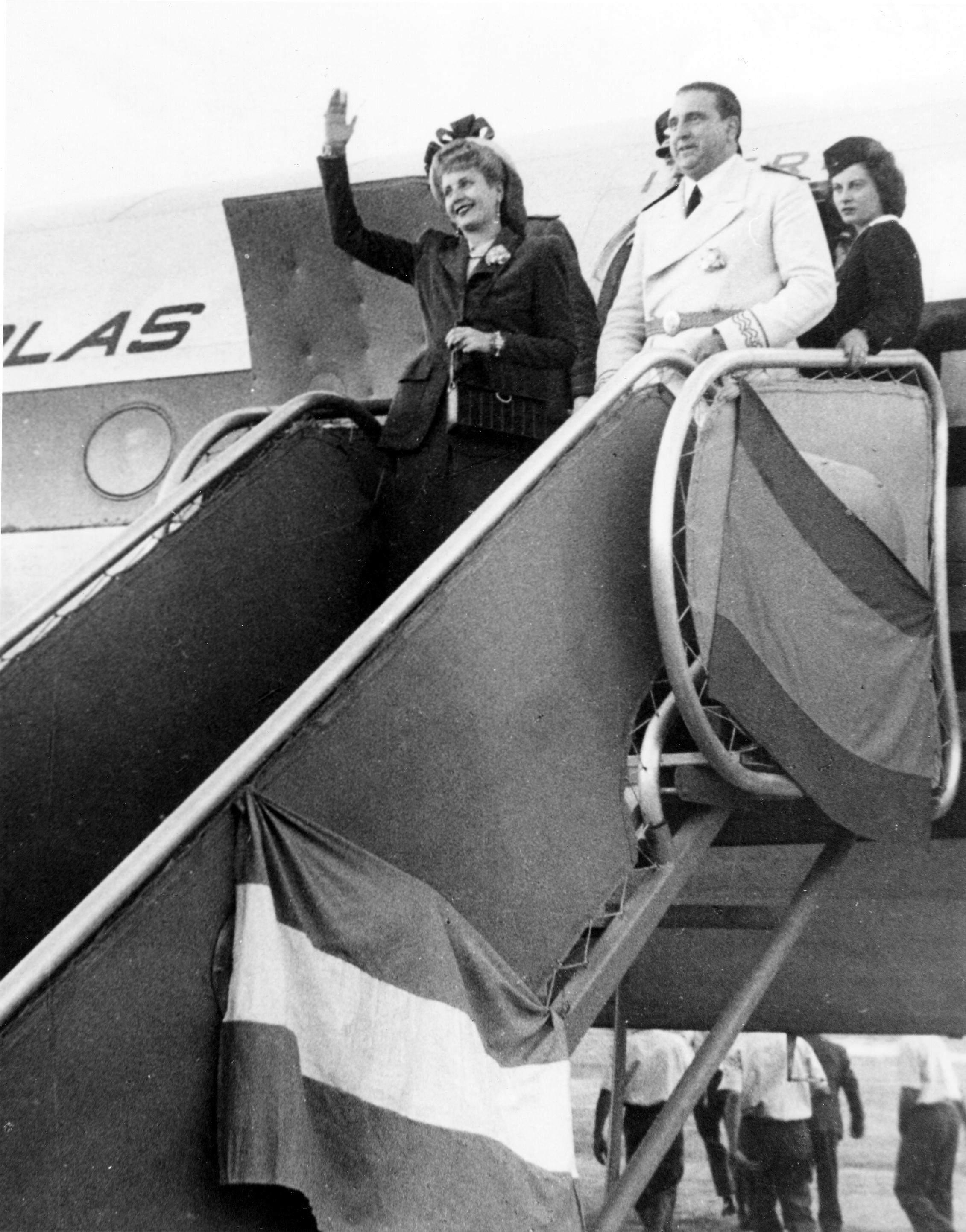
Perón arrives in Madrid.

In 1947, Eva embarked on a much-publicized "Rainbow Tour" of Europe, meeting with numerous dignitaries and heads of state, such as Francisco Franco and Pope Pius XII. The tour had its genesis in an invitation that the Spanish leader had extended to Perón; Eva decided that if Perón would not accept Franco's invitation for a state visit to Spain, then she would. Argentina had only recently emerged from its "wartime quarantine", thus taking its place in the United Nations and improving relations with the United States. Therefore, a visit to Franco, with António Salazar of Portugal, the last remaining Western European authoritarian leader in power, was diplomatically frowned upon internationally. Advisers then decided that Eva should also visit other European countries in addition to Spain. This would make it seem that Eva's sympathies were not specifically with Francoist Spain. The tour was billed not as a political tour but as a non-political "goodwill" tour.

Eva was well received in Spain, where she visited the tombs of Spanish monarchs Ferdinand and Isabella in the Capilla Real de Granada. Francoist Spain had not recovered from the Spanish Civil War (the autarkic economy and the UN embargo meant that the country could not feed its people). During her visit to Spain, Eva handed out 100-peseta notes to many poor children she met on her journey. She also received from Franco the highest award given by the Spanish government, the Order of Isabella the Catholic.

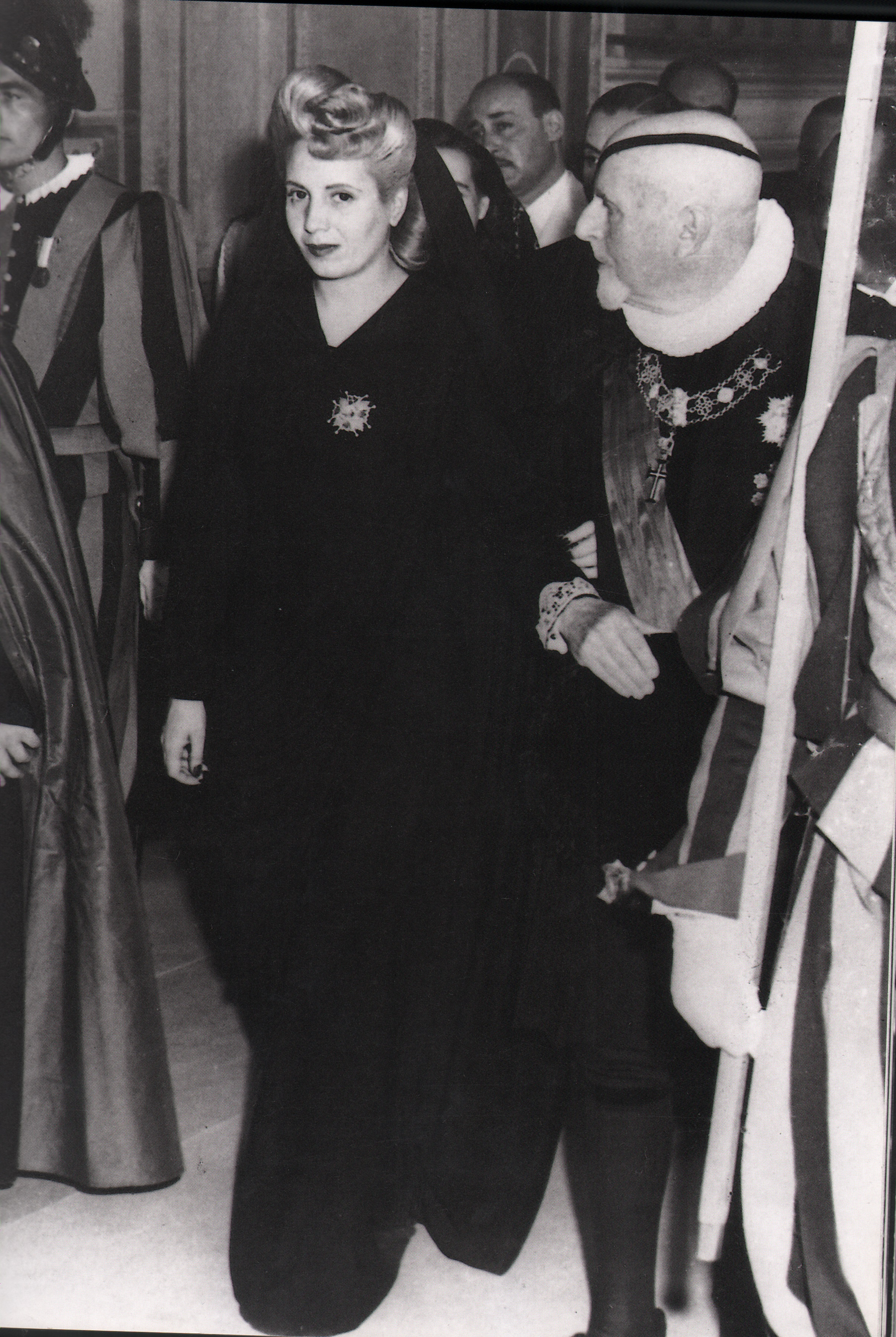
Perón escorted by Alessandro Ruspoli for her meeting with Pope Pius XII

Eva then visited Rome, where the reception was not as warm as it had been in Spain. Though Pope Pius XII did not give her a papal decoration, she was allowed the time usually allotted to queens and was given a rosary.

Her next stop was France, where she met with Charles de Gaulle. She promised France two shipments of wheat. While in France, she received word that George VI would not receive her when she planned to visit Britain, regardless of what his foreign office might advise, and that her visit would not be viewed as a state visit. She regarded the royal family's refusal to meet her as a snub and canceled the trip to the UK; she gave "exhaustion" as the official reason for not going to Britain.

She also visited Switzerland during her European tour, a visit that has been viewed as the worst part of the trip. According to the book Evita: A Biography by John Barnes, while she travelled down a street with many people crowding her car, someone threw two stones and smashed the windshield. She threw her hands up in shock, but was not injured. Later, as she sat with the foreign minister, protesters threw tomatoes at her. The tomatoes hit the foreign minister and splattered on Eva's dress. After these two events, she decided to conclude the two-month tour and return to Argentina.

Members of the Peronist opposition speculated that the true purpose of the European tour was to deposit funds in a Swiss bank account, although the tour was not an unusual practice and "there are many more convenient and less conspicuous ways of depositing money in Swiss accounts than meeting the Swiss Foreign Minister and being shown around a watch factory". It was unlikely that a Swiss bank account existed.

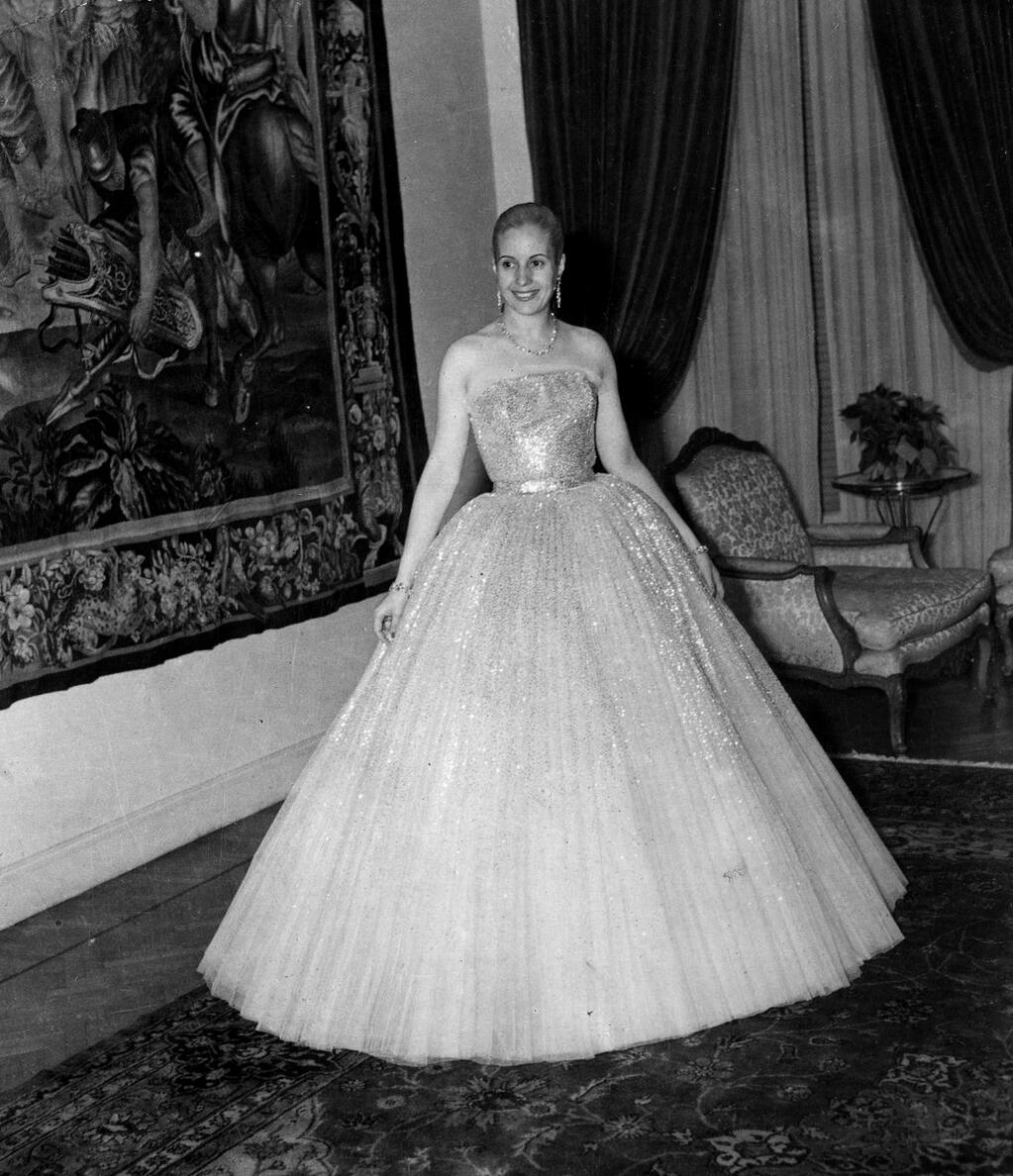
Perón wearing a dress designed by Christian Dior

During her tour to Europe, Eva was featured in a cover story for Time magazine. The cover's caption – "Eva Perón: Between two worlds, an Argentine rainbow" – is a reference to the name given to her tour, The Rainbow Tour. This was the only time in the periodical's history that a South American first lady appeared alone on its cover. (In 1951, she appeared again but with Perón.) The 1947 cover story was also the first publication to mention that Eva had been born out of wedlock. In retaliation, the periodical was banned from Argentina for several months.

After returning to Argentina from Europe, she never again appeared in public with the complicated hairdos of her movie-star days. The bright blonde colour she dyed her hair became more subdued in tone, and she began to style her hair pulled back into a heavy braided chignon. Her extravagant clothing became more refined after the tour; she no longer wore the elaborate hats and form-fitting dresses of Argentine designers. Instead, she adopted simpler and more fashionable Parisian couture and became particularly attached to the fashions of Christian Dior and the jewellery of Cartier. In an attempt to cultivate a more serious political persona, she began to appear in public wearing conservative though stylish tailleurs (a business-like combination of skirts and jackets), which were also made by Dior and other Paris couture houses.

== Charitable and feminist activities ==
=== Eva Perón Foundation ===
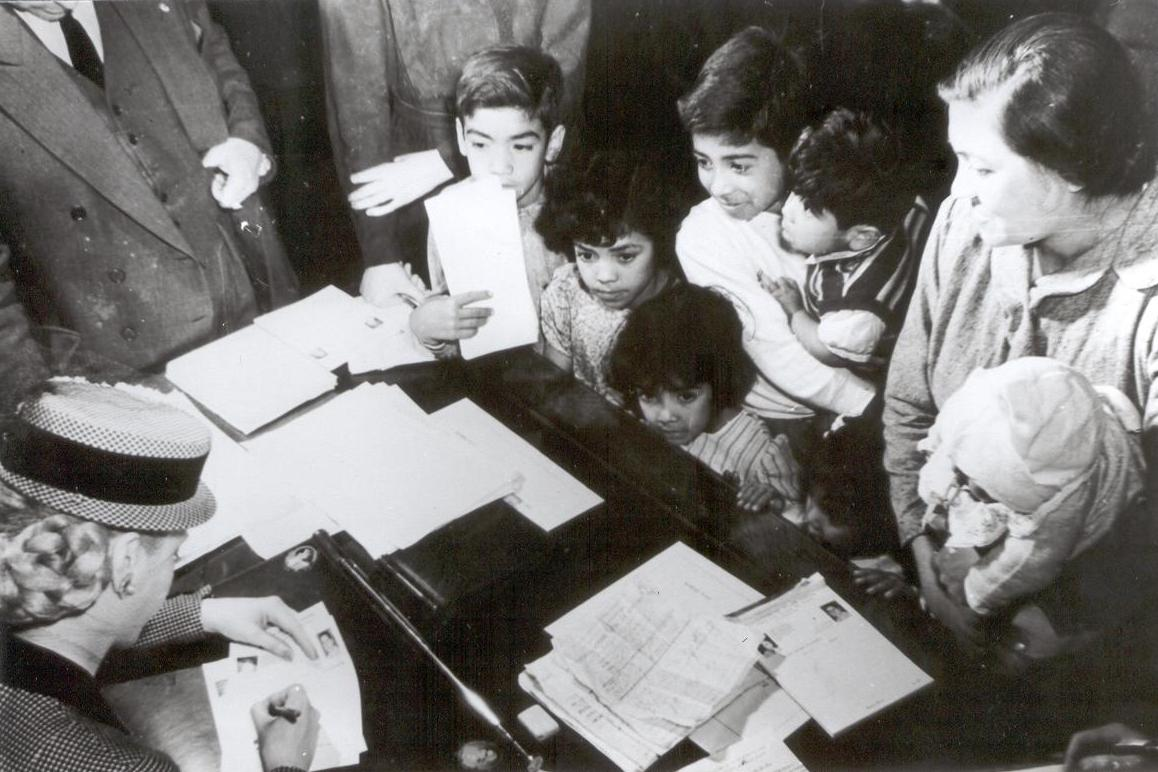
Perón meets with the public in her foundation's office.

The Sociedad de Beneficencia de Buenos Aires (Society of Beneficence), a charitable organization made up of 87 society ladies, was responsible for most works of charity in Buenos Aires prior to Perón's presidency. At one point, the Sociedad had cared heavily for orphans and homeless women but had slowed these activities by the time of Perón's first term. In the 19th century, the Sociedad had been supported by private contributions, largely those of the husbands of the society ladies, but by the 1940s, the Sociedad was supported by the government.

It had been the tradition of the Sociedad to elect the First Lady of Argentina as its president. However, the ladies of the Sociedad did not approve of Eva Perón's impoverished background, lack of formal education, and former career as an actress. Afraid that Perón would set a bad example for the orphans, the society ladies did not extend to Perón the position of president of their organization. It has often been said that Perón had the government funding for the Sociedad cut off in retaliation. This version of events has been called into question, however, the government funding that had previously supported the Sociedad then went to support Perón's own foundation. The Eva Perón Foundation began with 10,000 pesos provided by Perón herself.

In The Woman with the Whip, the first English-language biography of Perón, author Mary Main writes that no account records were kept for the foundation, because it was merely a means of funneling government money into private Swiss bank accounts controlled by the Peróns. Fraser and Navarro counter these claims, writing that Minister of Finance Ramón Cereijo did keep records and that the foundation "began as the simplest response to the poverty [Perón] encountered each day in her office" and to "the appalling backwardness of social services—or charity, as it was still called—in Argentina". Crassweller writes that the foundation was supported by donations of cash and goods from the Peronist unions and private businesses, and that the General Confederation of Labour donated three man-days (later reduced to two) of salary for every worker per year. Tax on lottery and movie tickets also helped to support the foundation, as did a levy on casinos and revenue from horse races. Crassweller also notes that there were some cases of businesses being pressured to donate to the foundation, with negative repercussions resulting if requests for donations were not met.

Within a few years, the foundation's assets in cash and goods exceeded three billion pesos, or over $200 million at the exchange rate of the late 1940s. It employed 14,000 workers, of whom 6,000 were construction workers and 26 were priests. It purchased and distributed 400,000 pairs of shoes, 500,000 sewing machines, and 200,000 cooking pots annually. The foundation also gave scholarships, built homes, hospitals, and other charitable institutions. Every aspect of the foundation was under Eva Perón's supervision. The foundation also built entire communities, such as Evita City, which still exists today. Due to the works and health services of the foundation, Argentine health care became significantly more equal.

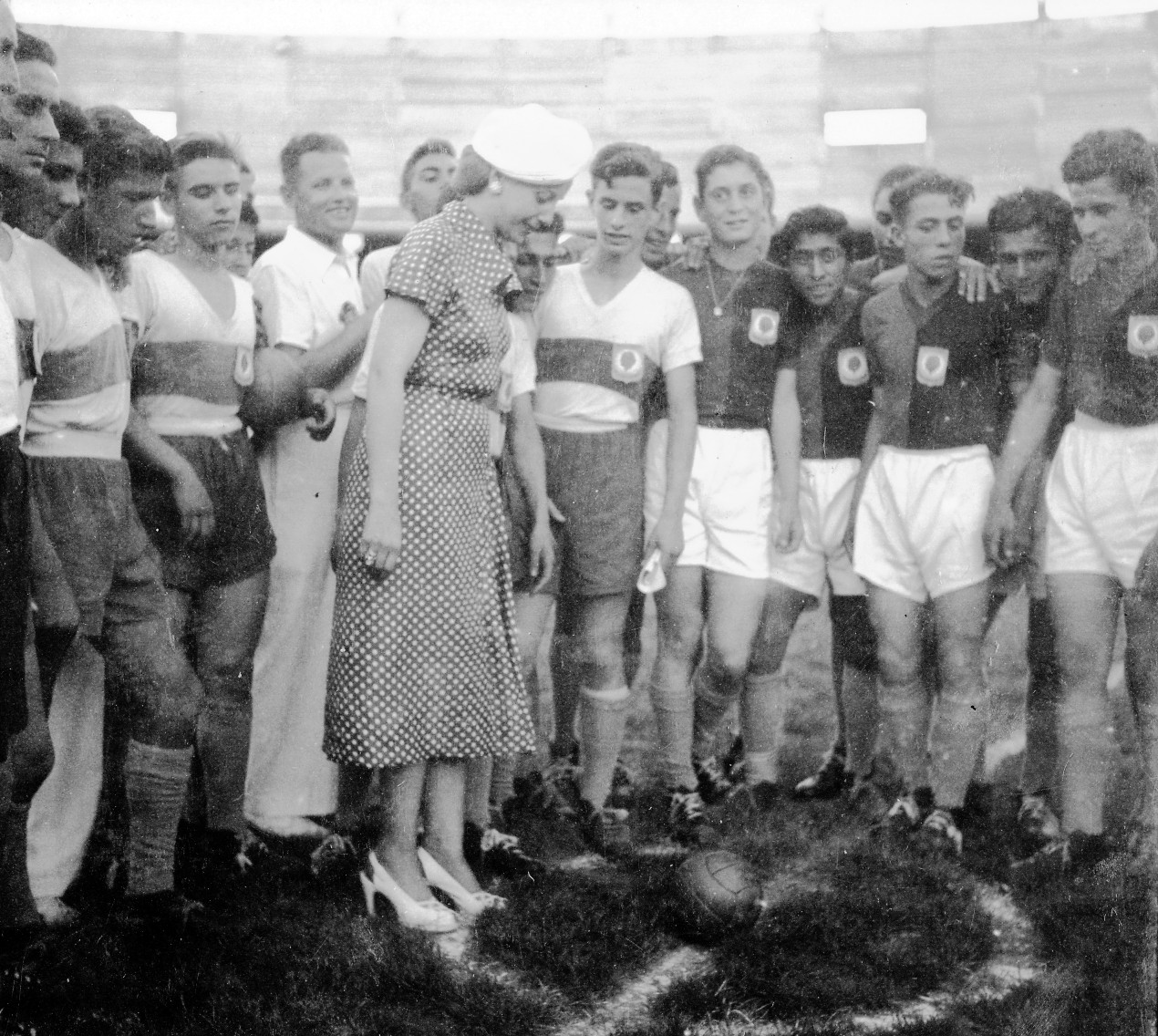
Perón kicks off the Youth Football Championship, 1948

Toward the end of her life, Perón was working as many as 20 to 22 hours per day in her foundation, often ignoring her husband's request that she cut back on her workload and take the weekends off. As she worked with the poor, she developed a more outraged attitude toward the existence of poverty, saying, "Sometimes I have wished my insults were slaps or lashes. I've wanted to hit people in the face to make them see, if only for a day, what I see each day I help the people." Crassweller writes that Perón became fanatical about her work in the foundation and felt as though she were on a crusade against the very concept and existence of poverty and social ills. "It is not surprising", writes Crassweller, "that as her public crusades and her private adorations took on a narrowing intensity after 1946, they simultaneously veered toward the transcendental." Crassweller compares Perón to Ignatius of Loyola, saying she came to be akin to a one-woman Jesuit Order.

=== Female Peronist Party and women's suffrage ===
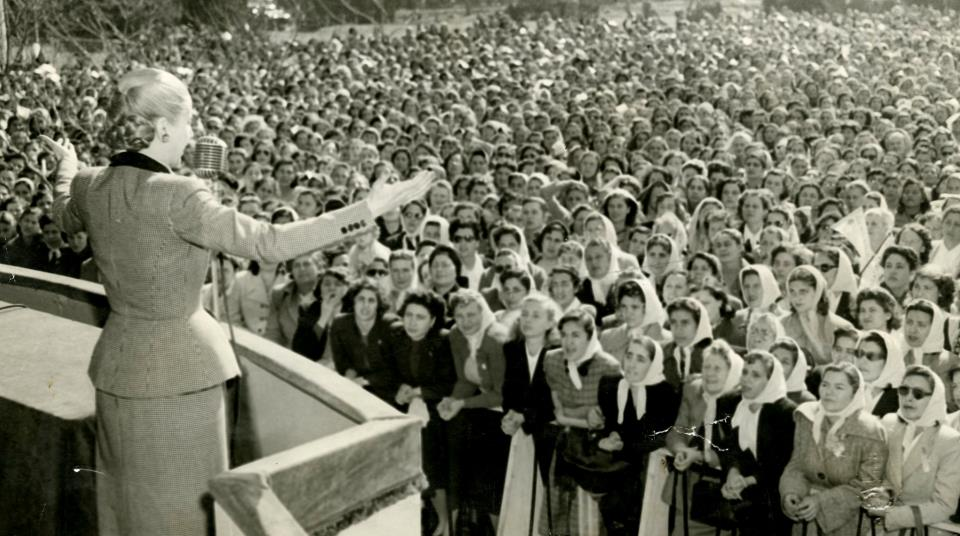
Perón speaking to a crowd of women.

Perón has often been credited with gaining the right to vote for Argentine women. While she made radio addresses in support of women's suffrage and also published articles in her Democracia newspaper asking male Peronists to support women's right to vote, ultimately, the ability to grant women the right to vote was beyond her powers. Her actions were limited to supporting a bill introduced by one of her supporters, Eduardo Colom, a bill that was eventually dropped.

A new women's suffrage bill was introduced, which the Senate of Argentina sanctioned on 21 August 1946. It was necessary to wait more than a year before the House of Representatives sanctioned it on 9 September 1947. Law 13,010 established the equality of political rights between men and women and universal suffrage in Argentina. The law was approved unanimously. In a public celebration and ceremony, Juan Perón signed the law granting women the right to vote, and then he handed the bill to Eva, symbolically making it hers.

She then created the Female Peronist Party, the first large female political party in the nation. By 1951, the party had 500,000 members and 3,600 headquarters across the country. While Perón did not consider herself a feminist, her impact on the political life of women was decisive. Thousands of previously apolitical women entered politics because of her. They were the first women active in Argentine politics. The combination of female suffrage and the organization of the Female Peronist Party granted Juan Perón a large majority (63 per cent) of the vote in the 1951 general election.

== 1952 presidential election ==
=== Vice-presidential nomination ===
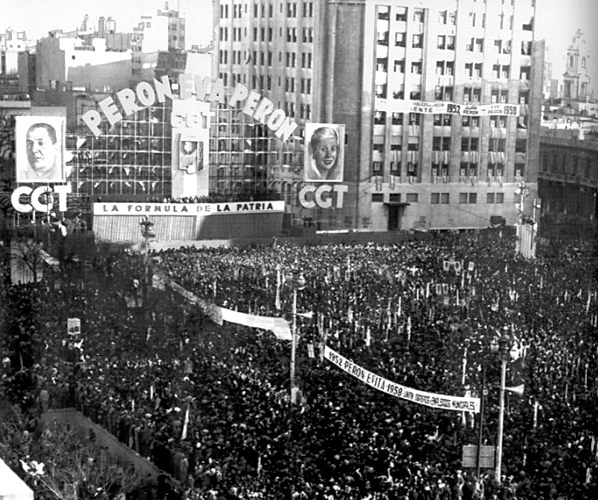
A crowd of an estimated two million gathers in 1951 to show support for the Juan Perón–Eva Perón ticket.

In 1951, Eva was chosen by Juan as a candidate for vice-president. This move was not welcomed by some of Juan Perón's more conservative allies, to whom the possibility of Eva becoming president in the event of Juan's death was not acceptable.

Eva was immensely popular, particularly among working-class women. The intensity of the support she drew from the people is said to have surprised her husband. The wide support her proposed candidacy generated indicated to him that she had become as important a figure of the Peronist party as he was.

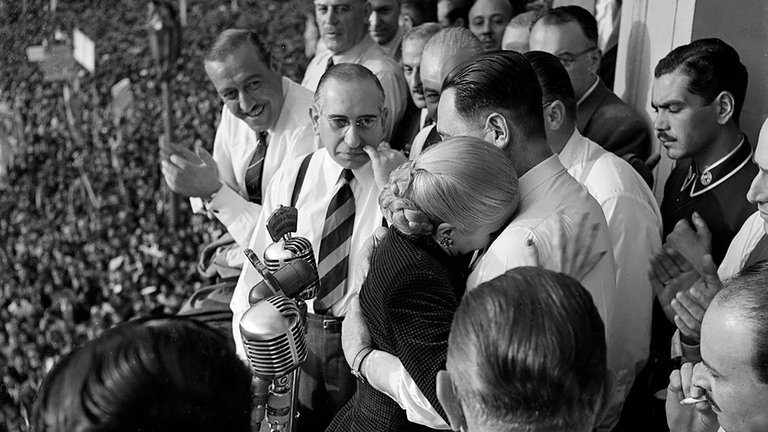
Perón embraces her husband during the 1951 joint ticket rally, unable to accept popular calls that she run for vice-president.

On 22 August 1951, the aligned labor unions held a massive rally that they called the "Cabildo Abierto", a reference to the first local government of the May Revolution of 1810. The Peróns addressed the crowd from the balcony of a large scaffolding set up on the Avenida 9 de Julio, several blocks away from the Casa Rosada, the official government house of Argentina. Overhead were two large portraits of Eva and Juan Perón. It has been claimed that "Cabildo Abierto" was the largest public display of support in history for a female political figure.

Perón's renunciation speech (in Spanish). Source: Radio Nacional. RTA. Argentina

She declined the invitation to run for vice-president. She said that her only ambition was that in the large chapter of history to be written about her husband, the footnotes would mention a woman who brought the "hopes and dreams of the people to the president", a woman who eventually turned those hopes and dreams into "glorious reality". In Peronist rhetoric, this event has come to be referred to as "The Renunciation", portraying her as having been a selfless woman in line with the Hispanic myth of marianismo.

=== Re-election and Spiritual Leader of the Nation ===
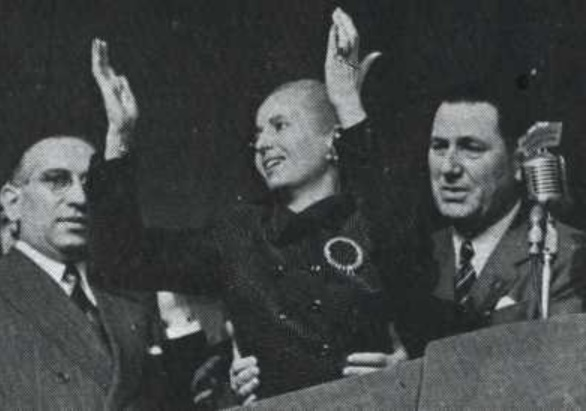
Eva Perón addresses the Peronists on 1 May 1952. By this point, she had become too weak to stand without Juan Perón's aid.

In 1952, Shortly before her death from cancer at 33, she was given the title of "Spiritual Leader of the Nation" by the Argentine Congress.

On 4 June 1952, she rode with her husband in a parade through Buenos Aires in celebration of his re-election. She was by this point so ill that she was unable to stand without support. Underneath her oversized fur coat was a frame made of plaster and wire that allowed her to stand. She took a triple dose of pain medication before the parade and took another two doses when she returned home.

== Death and aftermath ==
=== Declining health ===
On 9 January 1950, Perón fainted in public and underwent surgery three days later. Although it was reported that she had undergone an appendectomy, she was actually found to have advanced cervical cancer. Fainting episodes continued through 1951 (including the evening after the "Cabildo abierto"), with extreme weakness and severe vaginal bleeding. By 1951, it had become evident that her health was rapidly deteriorating. A few months after "the Renunciation", Perón secretly underwent a radical hysterectomy, performed by American surgeon George T. Pack at the Memorial Sloan-Kettering Cancer Center, in an attempt to remove the cervical tumor. In 2011, a Yale neurosurgeon, Daniel E. Nijensohn, studied Perón's skull X-rays and photographic evidence and said that she may have been given a prefrontal lobotomy in the last months of her life "to relieve the pain, agitation and anxiety she suffered in the final months of her illness". Péron's cervical cancer had metastasized and returned rapidly, despite the hysterectomy. She was the first Argentine to undergo chemotherapy – a novel treatment at that time. She became emaciated, weighing only 36 kg (79 lb; 5 st 9 lb) by June 1952.

=== Death ===
Perón died at 8:25 p.m. on Saturday, 26 July 1952, at the Unzue Palace. Radio broadcasts throughout the country were interrupted with the announcement that "the Press Secretary's Office of the Presidency of the Nation fulfils its very sad duty to inform the people of the Republic that at 20:25 hours, Mrs. Eva Perón, Spiritual Leader of the Nation, died."

=== Mourning ===
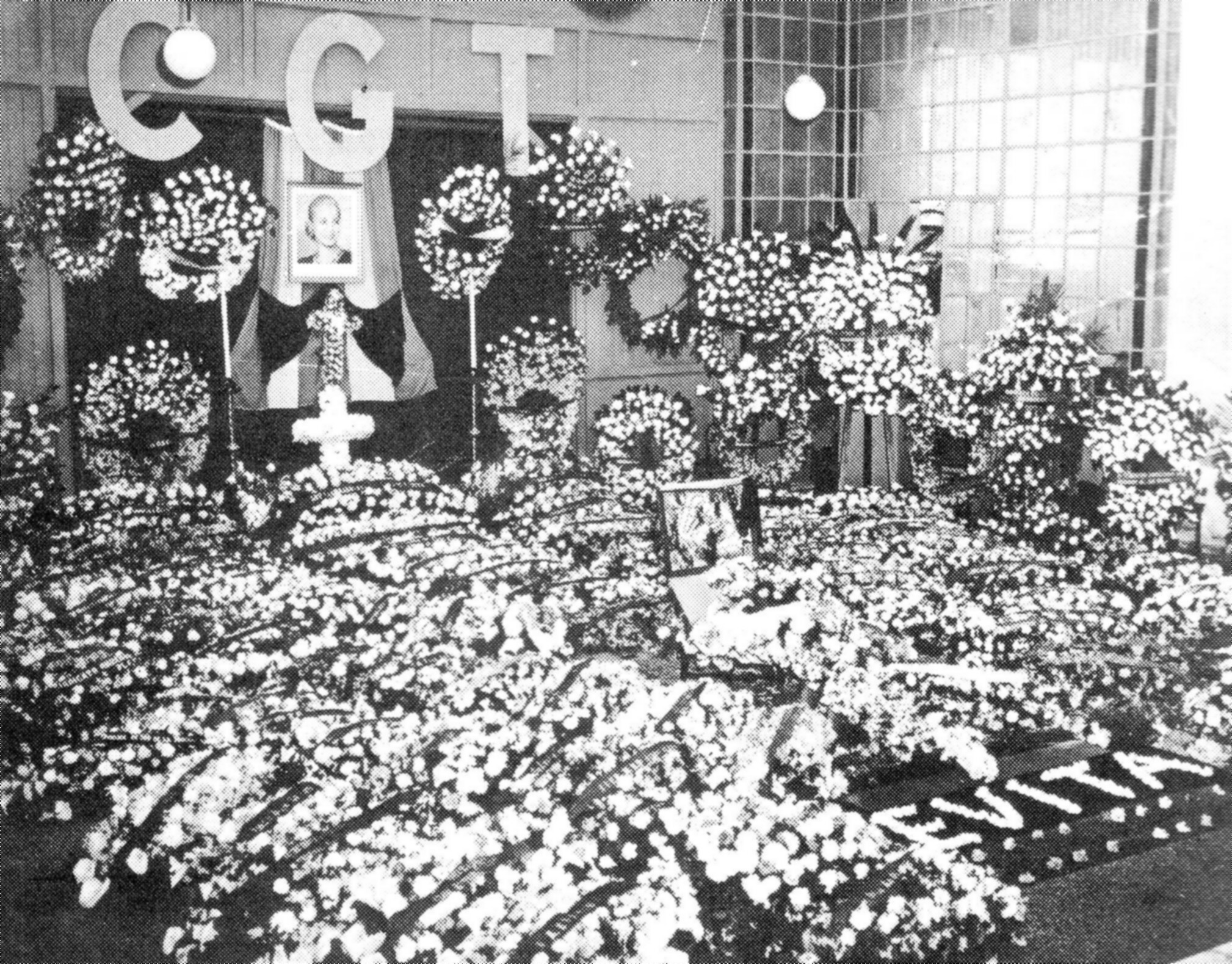
Perón's elaborately adorned funeral

Immediately after Perón's death, the government suspended all official activities for several days and ordered that all flags be flown at half-staff for 10 days. Business across the country was put to a halt, as movies were stopped and patrons were asked to leave restaurants. Popular grief was overwhelming. The crowd outside of the presidential residence, where Perón died, grew dense, congesting the streets for ten blocks in each direction.

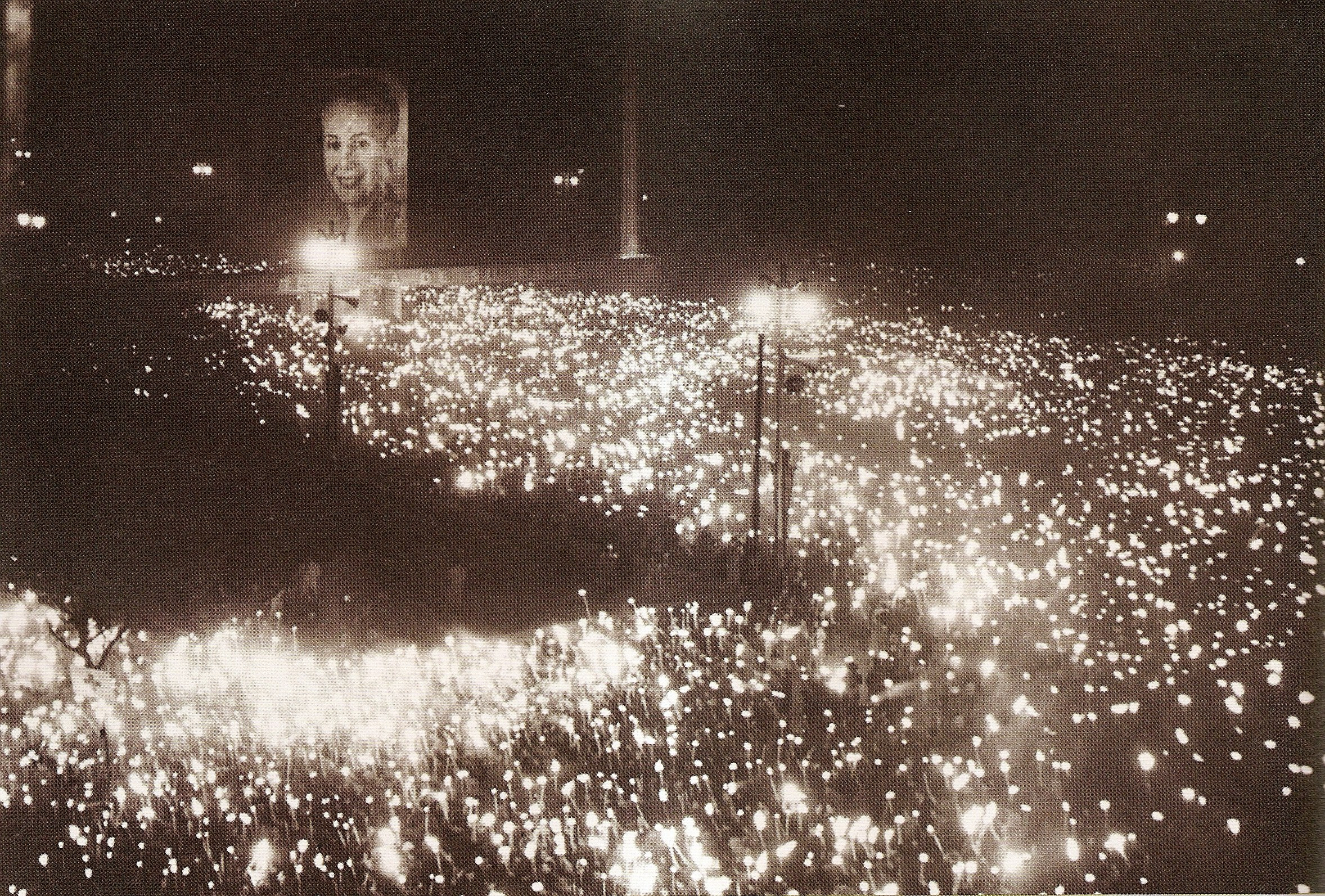
Nearly 3 million people attended Evita's funeral in the streets of Buenos Aires.

The morning after her death, while Perón's body was being moved to the Ministry of Labor Building, eight people were crushed to death in the throngs. In the following 24 hours, over 2,000 people were treated in city hospitals for injuries sustained in the rush to be near Perón as her body was being transported, and thousands more were treated on the spot. For the following two weeks, lines of people stretched for several city blocks, with mourners waiting hours to see Perón's body at the Ministry of Labor.

The streets of Buenos Aires were filled with flowers. Within a day of Perón's death, all flower shops in Buenos Aires had run out of stock. Flowers were flown in from all over the country and Chile. Despite the fact that Perón never held a political office, she was eventually given a state funeral, usually reserved for a head of state, along with a full Catholic Requiem Mass. A memorial was held in Helsinki for the Argentine team to attend during the 1952 Summer Olympics since her death occurred during the games.

On 9 August the body was transferred to the Congress Building for an additional day of public viewing, and a memorial service was attended by the entire Argentine legislative body. The next day, after a final Mass, the coffin was laid on a gun carriage pulled by CGT officials. It was followed by Juan Perón, his cabinet, Eva's family and friends, and the delegates and representatives of the Female Peronist Party—then workers, nurses and students of the Eva Peron Foundation. Flowers were thrown from balconies and windows.

There were different interpretations of the popular mourning of Perón's death. Some reporters viewed the mourning as authentic, while others saw a public succumbing to another of the "passion plays" of the Peronist regime. Time reported that the Peronist government enforced the observance of a daily period of five minutes of mourning following a daily radio announcement.

Upon her death, the Argentine public was told that Perón was 30 years old. The discrepancy was meant to dovetail with Perón's earlier tampering with her birth certificate. During Perón's time, children born to unmarried parents did not have the same legal rights as those born to married parents. Biographer Julie M. Taylor, professor of anthropology at Rice University, states that Perón was aware of the pain of being born "illegitimate". Taylor speculates that Perón's awareness of this may have influenced her decision to have the law changed so that "illegitimate" children would henceforth be referred to as "natural" children.

=== Memorial ===
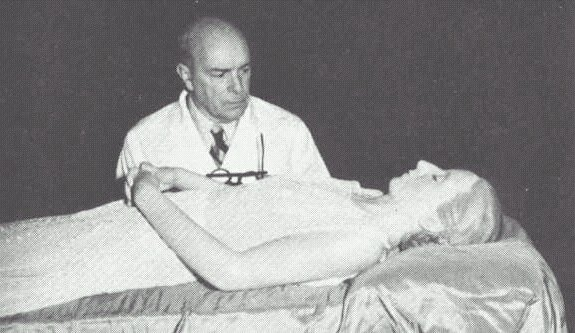
Pedro Ara inspecting Eva Perón's embalmed corpse

Shortly after Perón's death, Pedro Ara, who was well known for his embalming skill, was approached to embalm the body. It is doubtful that Perón ever expressed a wish to be embalmed, which suggests that it was most likely Juan Perón's decision. Ara replaced the subject's blood with glycerine in order to preserve the organs and lend an appearance of "artistically rendered sleep".

=== Disappearance and return of body ===
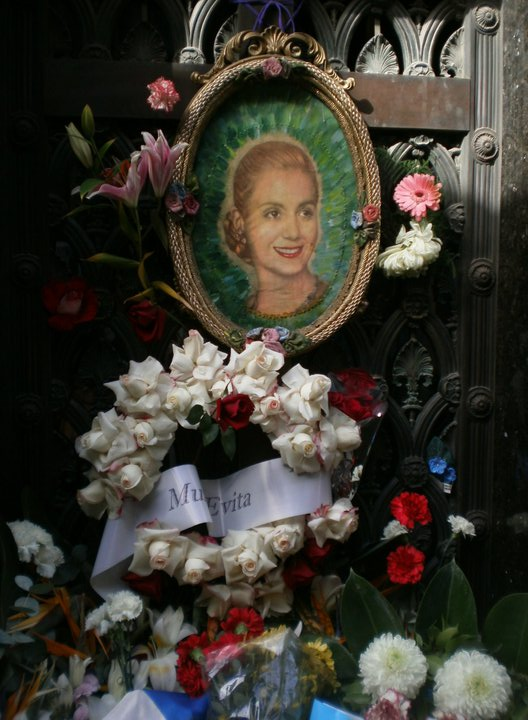
Perón rests in La Recoleta Cemetery

Shortly after Perón's death, plans were made to construct a memorial in her honour. The monument, which was to be a statue of a man representing the descamisados, was projected to be larger than the Statue of Liberty. Perón's body was to be stored in the base of the monument and, in the tradition of Lenin's corpse, to be displayed for the public. While the monument was being constructed, Perón's embalmed body was displayed in her former office at the CGT building for almost two years. Before the monument was completed, Juan Perón was overthrown in a military coup, the Revolución Libertadora, in 1955. He fled the country and was unable to make arrangements to secure Eva's body.

Following his flight, a military dictatorship took power. The new authorities removed Perón's body from display, and its whereabouts were unknown for 16 years. From 1955 until 1971, the military dictatorship of Argentina maintained a ban on Peronism. In 1971, the military found that Perón's body was buried in a crypt in Milan, Italy, under the name "María Maggi de Magistris". It appeared that her body had been damaged during its transport and storage, including compressions to her face and disfigurement of one of her feet because the body had been left in an upright position.

In 1995, Tomás Eloy Martínez published Santa Evita, a fictionalised work propounding many new stories about the escapades of the corpse. Allegations that her body was the object of sexual abuse are derived from his description of an 'emotional necrophilia' by embalmers Colonel Koenig and his assistant Arancibia. Many primary and secondary references to his novel have inaccurately stated that her body was sexually abused, resulting in the widespread belief in this myth. Also included are allegations that many wax copies had been made, that the corpse had been damaged with a hammer, and that one of the wax copies was the object of an officer's sexual attentions.

=== Final resting place ===
In 1971, Perón's body was exhumed and flown to Spain, where Juan Perón maintained the corpse in his home. Perón and his third wife, Isabel, decided to keep the corpse in their dining room on a platform near the table. In 1973, Perón came out of exile and returned to Argentina, where he became president for the third time. Perón died in office in 1974. That year, the group Montoneros stole the corpse of Pedro Eugenio Aramburu, whom they had also previously kidnapped and assassinated. Montoneros then used the body of Aramburu to bargain for the repatriation of Eva's body. Isabel, who had been elected vice-president, succeeded him and had Eva's body returned to Argentina to be displayed beside Juan's body. Once Eva's body had arrived in Argentina, Montoneros left Aramburu's corpse on a street in Buenos Aires.

Eva's body was later buried in the Duarte family tomb in La Recoleta Cemetery. Later Argentine governments took elaborate measures to make her tomb secure. The tomb's marble floor has a trap door that leads to a compartment containing two coffins. Under that compartment is a second trap door and a second compartment, where her coffin rests.

== Legacy ==
=== Argentina and Latin America ===
In all of Latin America, only one other woman has aroused an emotion, devotion, and faith comparable to those awakened by the Virgin of Guadalupe. In many homes, the image of Evita is on the wall next to the Virgin.

— Fabienne Rousso-Lenoir

In his essay titled "Latin America" published in The Oxford Illustrated History of Christianity, John McManners claims that the appeal and success of Perón are related to Latin American mythology and concepts of divinity. McManners claims that Perón consciously incorporated aspects of the theology of the Virgin and of Mary Magdalene into her public persona. Historian Hubert Herring describes Perón as "perhaps the shrewdest woman yet to appear in public life in Latin America".

In a 1996 interview, Tomás Eloy Martínez refers to Perón as "the Cinderella of the tango and the Sleeping Beauty of Latin America". Martínez suggests she has remained an important cultural icon for the same reasons as fellow Argentine Che Guevara:

Latin American myths are more resistant than they seem to be. Not even the mass exodus of the Cuban raft people or the rapid decomposition and isolation of Fidel Castro's regime have eroded the triumphal myth of Che Guevara, which remains alive in the dreams of thousands of young people in Latin America, Africa and Europe. Che as well as Evita symbolize certain naive, but effective, beliefs: the hope for a better world; a life sacrificed on the altar of the disinherited, the humiliated, the poor of the earth. They are myths which somehow reproduce the image of Christ.

Although not a government holiday, the anniversary of Perón's death is marked by many Argentines each year. Additionally, she has been featured on Argentine coins, and a form of Argentine currency called "Evitas" was named in her honour. Ciudad Evita (Evita City), which was established by the Eva Perón Foundation in 1947, is located just outside Buenos Aires.

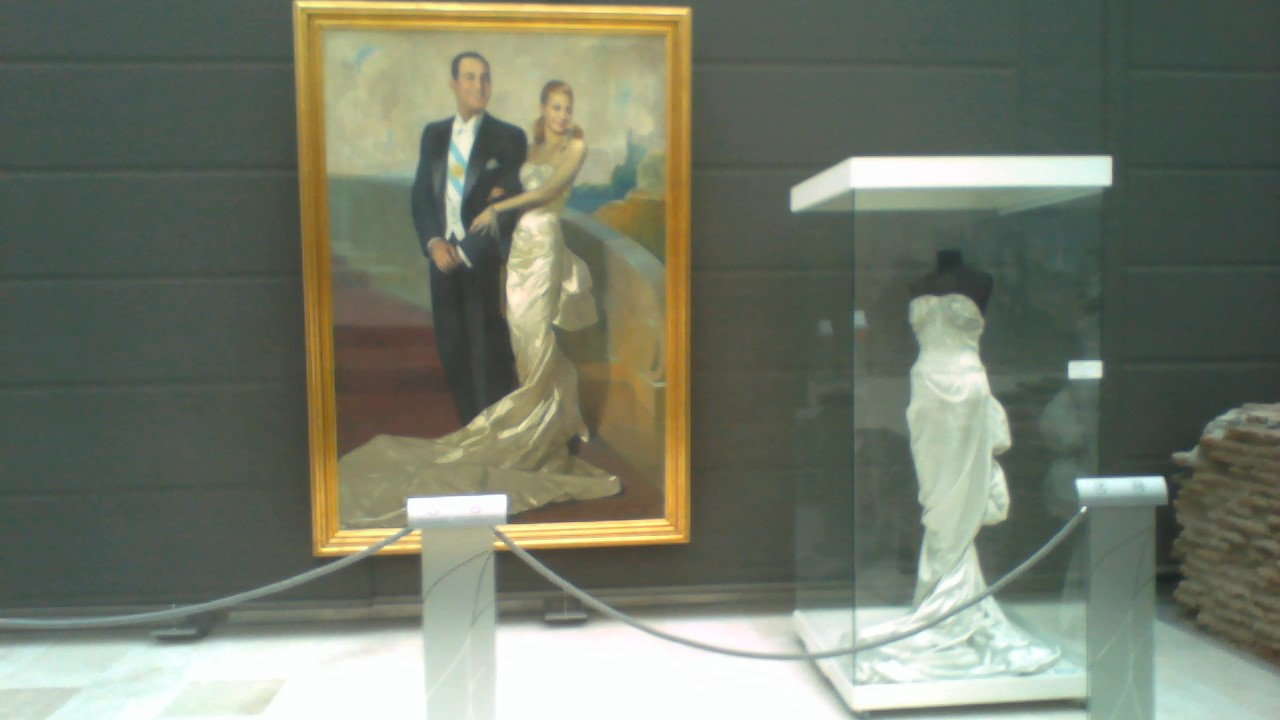
Dress of Eva Perón in the Museo del Bicentenario, Buenos Aires

Cristina Fernández de Kirchner, the first elected female president in Argentine history, is a Peronist who has occasionally been referred to as "The New Evita". Kirchner says she does not want to compare herself to Perón, claiming she was a unique phenomenon in Argentine history. Kirchner also says that women of her generation, who came of age in the 1970s during the military dictatorships in Argentina, owe a debt to Perón for offering an example of passion and combativeness. On 26 July 2002, the 50th anniversary of Perón's death, a museum opened in her honour, the Museo Evita. The museum, created by her great-niece Cristina Alvarez Rodriguez, houses many of Perón's clothes, portraits, and artistic renderings of her life, and has become a popular tourist attraction. The museum was opened in a building that was once used by the Eva Perón Foundation.

Taylor claims that Perón has remained important in Argentina as a result of three unique factors:

In the images examined, the three elements consistently linked—femininity, mystical or spirituality power, and revolutionary leadership—display an underlying common theme. Identification with any one of these elements puts a person or a group at the margins of established society and at the limits of institutional authority. Anyone who can identify with all three images lays an overwhelming and echoing claim to dominance through forces that recognize no control in society or its rules. Only a woman can embody all three elements of this power.

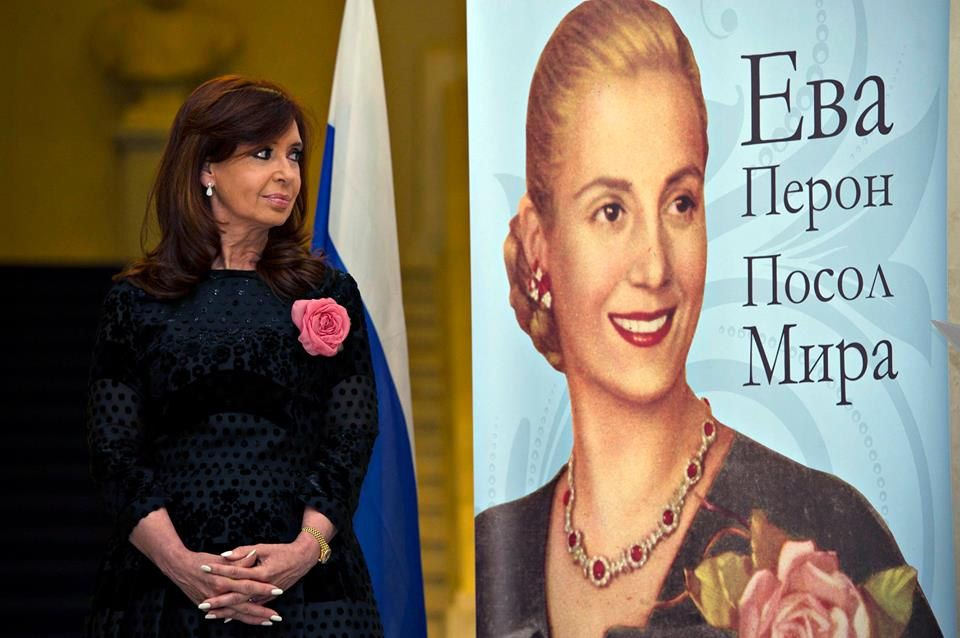
President Cristina Fernández de Kirchner in the exhibition of "Evita: Ambassador of Peace", in the State Historical Museum of Moscow

Taylor argues that the fourth factor in Perón's continued importance in Argentina relates to her status as a dead woman and the power that death holds over the public imagination. Taylor suggests that Perón's embalmed corpse is analogous to the incorruptibility of various Catholic saints, such as Bernadette Soubirous, and has powerful symbolism within the largely Catholic cultures of Latin America:

To some extent her continuing importance and popularity may be attributed not only to her power as a woman but also to the power of the dead. However a society's vision of the afterlife may be structured, death by its nature remains a mystery, and, until society formally allays the commotion it causes, a source of disturbance and disorder. Women and the dead—death and womanhood—stand in similar relation to structured social forms: outside public institutions, unlimited by official rules, and beyond formal categories. As a female corpse reiterating the symbolic themes of both woman and martyr, Eva Perón perhaps lays double claim to spiritual leadership.

John Balfour was the British ambassador in Argentina during the Perón regime and describes her popularity:

She was by any standard a very extraordinary woman; when you think of Argentina and indeed Latin America as a men-dominated part of the world, there was this woman who was playing a very great role. And of course she aroused very different feelings in the people with whom she lived. The oligarchs, as she called the well-to-do and privileged people, hated her. They looked upon her as a ruthless woman. The masses of the people on the other hand worshipped her. They looked upon her as a lady bountiful who was dispensing Manna from heaven.

In 2011, two giant murals of Perón were unveiled on the building facades of the current Ministry of Social Development, located on 9 de Julio Avenue. The works were painted by Argentine artist Alejandro Marmo. On 26 July 2012, to commemorate the sixtieth anniversary of her death, notes were issued in a value of 100 pesos. The controversial effigy of Julio Argentino Roca was replaced by that of Perón, making her the first woman to be featured on the currency of Argentina. The image in the notes is based on a 1952 design, whose sketch was found in the mint, made by the engraver Sergio Pilosio with artist Roger Pfund. The printing totals 20 million notes; it is not clear whether the government will replace the notes that feature Roca and the Conquest of the Desert.

=== Allegations of fascism and antisemitism ===
Fewer antisemitic incidents took place in Argentina during Perón's rule than during any other period in the 20th century. ... Upon reading the numerous speeches that [Juan] Perón pronounced against antisemitism during his first two presidencies, it immediately becomes clear that no other president before Perón had rejected discrimination against Jews so clearly and unambiguously. The same goes for Eva Duarte de Perón. In many of her speeches, Evita argued that it was the country's oligarchy that upheld antisemitic attitudes, but that Peronism did not.

— Raanan Rein

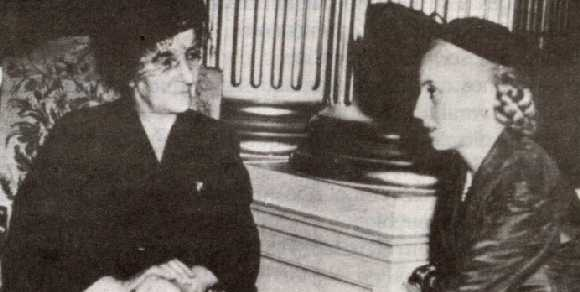
On 9 April 1951, Golda Meir, then Labor Minister of Israel, met with Perón to thank her for the aid that the Eva Perón Foundation had given Israel.

From the start, Juan Perón's opponents accused him of being a fascist. Spruille Braden, a diplomat from the United States who was greatly supported by Perón's opponents, campaigned against Perón's first candidacy on the platform that he was a fascist and a Nazi. The perception that the Peróns were fascists may have been enhanced during Evita's 1947 European tour, during which she was a guest of honour of Francisco Franco. By 1947, Franco had become politically isolated because he was one of the few remaining right-wing authoritarian leaders who had retained his power. Franco, therefore, was in desperate need of a political ally. With nearly a third of Argentina's population of Spanish descent, it seemed natural for Argentina to have diplomatic relations with Spain. Commenting on the international perception of Evita during her 1947 European tour, Fraser and Navarro write, "It was inevitable that Evita be viewed in a fascist context. Therefore, both Evita and Perón were seen to represent an ideology which had run its course in Europe, only to re-emerge in an exotic, theatrical, even farcical form in a faraway country."

Laurence Levine, the former president of the U.S.-Argentine Chamber of Commerce, writes that in contrast to Nazi ideology, the Peróns were not antisemitic. In the book Inside Argentina from Perón to Menem: 1950–2000 from an American Point of View, Levine writes:

The American government demonstrated no knowledge of Perón's deep admiration for Italy (and his distaste for Germany, whose culture he found too rigid). Nor did they appreciate that although anti-Semitism existed in Argentina, Perón's own views and his political associations were not anti-Semitic. They paid no attention to the fact that Perón sought out the Jewish community in Argentina to assist in developing his policies and that one of his most important allies in organizing the industrial sector was José Ber Gelbard, a Jewish immigrant from Poland.

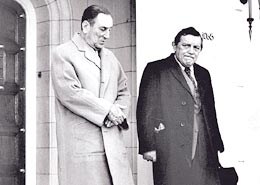
Juan Perón and future Economy Minister José Ber Gelbard

Crassweller writes, "Peronism was not fascism", and "Peronism was not Nazism." Crassweller also refers to the comments of U.S. Ambassador George S. Messersmith. While visiting Argentina in 1947, Messersmith made the following statement: "There is not as much social discrimination against Jews here as there is right in New York or in most places at home."

Time magazine published an article by Tomás Eloy Martínez—Argentine writer, journalist, and former director of the Latin American program at Rutgers University—titled "The Woman Behind the Fantasy: Prostitute, Fascist, Profligate—Eva Peron Was Much Maligned, Mostly Unfairly". In this article, Martínez writes that the accusations that Perón was a fascist, a Nazi, and a thief had been made against her for decades. He wrote that the allegations were untrue:

She was not a fascist—ignorant, perhaps, of what that ideology meant. And she was not greedy. Though she liked jewellery, furs and Dior dresses, she could own as many as she desired without the need to rob others. ... In 1964 Jorge Luis Borges stated that "the mother of that woman [Evita]" was "the madam of a whorehouse in Junín." He repeated the calumny so often that some still believe it or, more commonly, think Evita herself, whose lack of sex appeal is mentioned by all who knew her, apprenticed in that imaginary brothel. Around 1955, the pamphleteer Silvano Santander employed the same strategy to concoct letters in which Evita figures as an accomplice of the Nazis. It is true that (Juan) Perón facilitated the entrance of Nazi criminals to Argentina in 1947 and 1948, thereby hoping to acquire advanced technology developed by the Germans during the war. But Evita played no part.

The governments that preceded Juan Perón's government were antisemitic, but his was not. Juan Perón "eagerly and enthusiastically" attempted to recruit the Jewish community into his government and set up a branch of the Peronist party for Jewish members, known as the Organización Israelita Argentina. Perón's government was the first to court the Argentine Jewish community and the first to appoint Jewish citizens to public office. The Peronist regime has been accused of being fascist, but it has been argued that what passed for fascism under Perón never took hold in Latin America; additionally, because the Peronist regime allowed rival political parties to exist, it cannot be described as totalitarian.

=== International popular culture ===
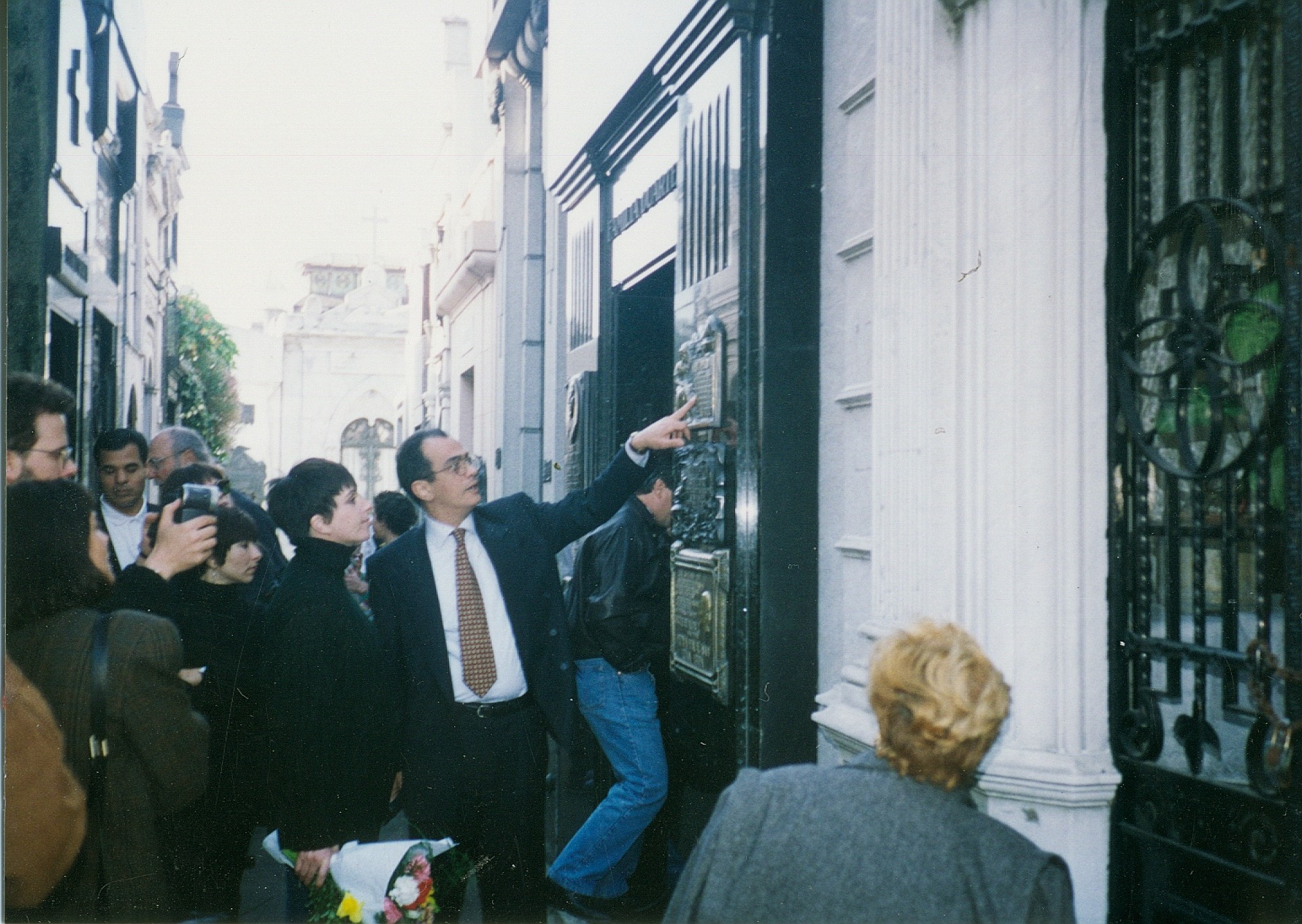
Liza Minnelli reading the plaque on Eva Perón's tomb, 1993. In the early 1980s, Minnelli was considered for the lead role in the movie version of the musical Evita.

By the late 20th century, Perón had become the subject of numerous articles, books, stage plays, and musicals, ranging from the 1952 biography The Woman with the Whip to a 1981 TV movie titled Evita Perón starring Faye Dunaway in the title role. The most successful rendering of her life has been the musical production Evita. The musical began as a concept album which was co-produced by Andrew Lloyd Webber and Tim Rice in 1976, with Julie Covington in the title role. Elaine Paige was later cast in the title role when the concept album was adapted into a musical stage production in London's West End, and it won the 1978 Olivier Award for Best Performance in a Musical. In 1980, Patti LuPone won the Tony Award for Best Leading Actress in a Musical for her performance as the title character in the Broadway production. The Broadway production also won the Tony Award for Best Musical. Nicholas Fraser claims that to date, "the musical stage production has been performed on every continent except Antarctica and it has generated over $2 billion in revenue." The musical had also been brought to the West End in 2025 at the London Palladium for a limited run, directed by Jamie Lloyd and starring Rachel Zegler.

As early as 1978, the musical was considered as the basis for a movie. After a nearly 20-year production delay, Madonna was cast in the title role for the 1996 film version, and she won the Golden Globe Award for "Best Actress in a Musical or Comedy". The film was also nominated for 5 Academy Awards, having won the Oscar for Best Original Song with "You Must Love Me".

In response to the American film, and in an alleged attempt to offer a more politically accurate depiction of Perón's life, an Argentine film company released Eva Perón: The True Story. The production stars Esther Goris in the title role. This movie was the 1996 Argentine submission for the Oscar in the category of "Best Foreign Language Film," but was not accepted as a nominee.

Nicholas Fraser writes that Perón is the perfect popular culture icon for our times, because her career foreshadowed what, by the late 20th century, had become common. During Perón's time, it was considered scandalous for a former entertainer to take part in public political life. Her detractors in Argentina had frequently accused her of turning public political life into show business. But by the late 20th century, Fraser claims, the public had become engrossed in the cult of celebrity, and public political life had become insignificant. In this regard, Perón was perhaps ahead of her time. Fraser also writes that Perón's story is appealing to our celebrity-obsessed age because her story confirms one of Hollywood's oldest clichés, the rags to riches story. Reflecting on Perón's popularity more than half a century after her death, Alma Guillermoprieto writes "Evita's life has evidently just begun."

Perón appears on the 100 peso note, first issued in 2012, commemorating the anniversary of her death. She is also featured the 100 peso note issued in 2022.

== Honours ==
=== National ===
- Argentina: Grand Cross with Collar of the Order of the Liberator General San Martín
- Argentina: Grand Cross of Honour of the Argentine Red Cross

=== Foreign ===
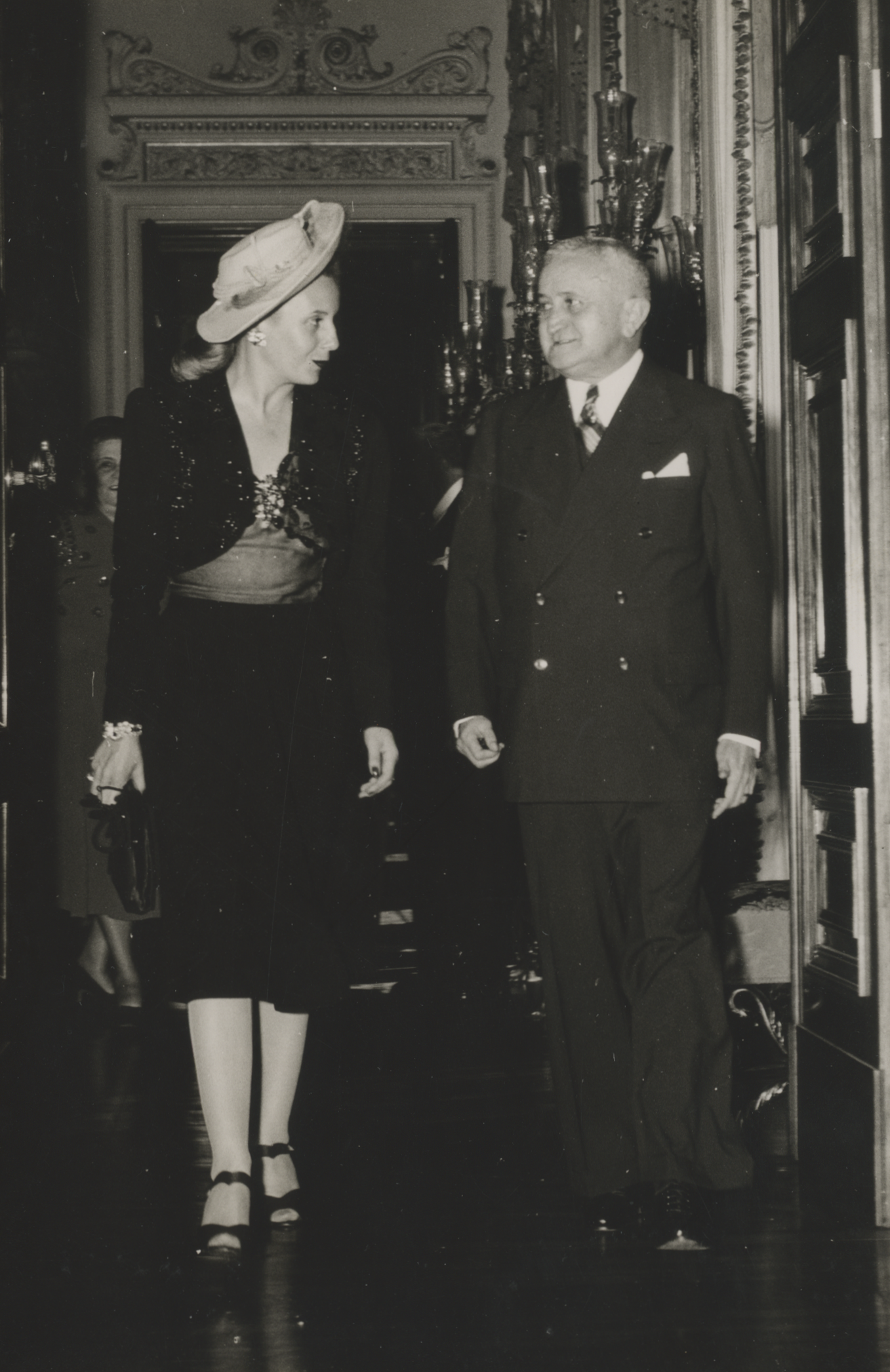
Eva Perón and Brazilian President Eurico Gaspar Dutra at the Catete Palace in Rio de Janeiro, 1947.

- Bolivia: Grand Cross of the Order of the Condor of the Andes
- Brazil: Grand Cross of the Order of the Southern Cross
- Colombia: Grand Cross of the Order of Boyaca, Special Class
- Netherlands: Dame Grand Cross of the Order of Orange-Nassau
- Spain: Dame Grand Cross of the Order of Isabella the Catholic
- Sovereign Military Order of Malta: Dame Grand Cross of Sovereign Military Order of Malta
- Mexico: Grand Cross of the Order of the Aztec Eagle
- Syria: Grand Cross of the Order of Omeyades
- Ecuador: Grand Cross of the Order of Merit and the Ecuadorian Red Cross
- Haiti: Grand Cross of the Order of Honour and Merit
- Peru: Grand Cross of the Order of the Sun of Peru
- Paraguay: Grand Cross of the National Order of Merit of Paraguay

In 2019, Time created 89 new covers to celebrate women of the year starting from 1920; it chose Perón for 1946.

== See also ==
- List of suffragists and suffragettes
- Timeline of women's suffrage
- Copa Eva Duarte

== Bibliography ==
- Adams, Jerome R (1993). Latin American Heroes: Liberators and Patriots from 1500 to the Present. Ballantine Books. ISBN 978-0-345-38384-6.
- Ara, Pedro (1974). El Caso Eva Perón.
- Barnes, John (1978). Evita, First Lady: A Biography of Eva Perón. New York, New York: Grove Press.
- Borroni, Otelo; Vacca, Roberto (1970). Eva Perón. CEAL.
- Crassweller, Robert D (1987). Peron and the Enigmas of Argentina. W.W. Norton & Company. ISBN 978-0-393-02381-7.
- Fraser, Nicholas; Navarro, Marysa (1996). Evita: The Real Life of Eva Perón. W.W. Norton & Company.
- Guillermoprieto, Alma (2002). Looking for History: Dispatches from Latin America. Vintage. ISBN 978-0-375-72582-1.
- Guy, Donna. "Life and the Commodification of Death in Argentina: Juan and Eva Perón" in Death, Dismemberment, and Memory: Body Politics in Latin America, Lyman L. Johnson, ed. Albuquerque: University of New Mexico Press 2004, pp. 245–272.
- Hurlock, Kathryn. Holy Places: How Pilgrimage Changed the World (London: Profile, 2025)
- Lerner, Barron H. (2000). "The illness and death of Eva Perón: cancer, politics, and secrecy". Lancet. 355 (9219): 1988–1991. doi:10.1016/s0140-6736(00)02337-0. PMID 10859055. S2CID 35607629.
- Levine, Lawrence (2001). Inside Argentina from Perón to Menem: 1950–2000 From an American Point of View. Edwin House Pub. ISBN 978-0-9649247-7-2.
- Main, Mary (1980). Evita: The Woman with the Whip. Dodd, Mead. ISBN 978-0-396-07834-0.
- McManners, John (2001). The Oxford Illustrated History of Christianity. Oxford University Press. ISBN 978-0-19-285439-1.
- Naipaul, V.S. (1980). The Return of Eva Perón. Alfred A. Knopf.
- Dujovne Ortiz, Alicia (1996). Eva Perón. St. Martin's Press. ISBN 978-0-312-14599-6.
- Perón, Eva (1952). La Razón de mi vida. Buro Editors.
- Quieroz, Juan Pablo; de Elia, Tomas (eds.). Evita: An Intimate Portrait of Eva Peron.
- Rousso-Lenoir, Fabienne (2002). America Latina. Assouline. ISBN 978-2-84323-335-7.
- Taylor, Julie M. (November 1979). Eva Perón: The Myths of a Woman. University of Chicago Press. ISBN 978-0-226-79143-2.
- Nasi, Kristina (2010). "Eva Peron in the Twenty-First Century: The Power of the Image in Argentina". The International Journal of the Image. pp. 99–106.

== See also ==
- Evita (musical), the 1978 musical based on her life

Honorary titles
Preceded by Conrada Victoria Torni	First Lady of Argentina; 1946–1952	Vacant Title next held by Mercedes Lonardi
New office	Spiritual Leader of the Nation of Argentina; 1952	Position abolished
Party political offices
New office	President of the Female Peronist Party; 1949–1952	Succeeded by Delia Parodi
Preceded by Hortensio Quijano	Peronist nominee for Vice President of Argentina; Withdrew; 1951	Succeeded by Hortensio Quijano
Non-profit organization positions
New office	President of the Eva Perón Foundation; 1948–1952	Succeeded by Juan Perón
