= List of Argentine films of 2013 =

This is a list of Argentine films of 2013

Argentine films of 2013
Title	Director	Release	Genre
A - C
7 Salamancas	Marcos Pastor	noviembre	
Abril en Nueva York	Martín Piroyansky	10 de octubre	
Aire de chacarera	Nicolás Tacconi	15 de agosto	
A la deriva	Fernando Pacheco	12 de diciembre	
Alumbrando en la oscuridad	Mónica Gazpio	18 de octubre	
Amor a mares	Ezequiel Crupnicoff	15 de noviembre	
Ante la ley	Emiliano Jelicié	21 de noviembre	
Antes	Daniel Gimelberg	7 de marzo	
El árbol de la muralla	Tomás Lipgot	14 de febrero	
Beirut - Buenos Aires - Beirut	Hernán Belón	28 de marzo	
Blackie: una vida en blanco y negro	Alberto Ponce	6 de diciembre	Documental
La boleta	Andrés Paternostro	5 de diciembre	
Boxing Club	Víctor Cruz	12 de diciembre	
Buscadores de identidades robadas	Miguel Rodríguez Arias	19 de septiembre	
Buscando la esfera del poder	Tetsuo Lumière	5 de octubre	
Caídos del mapa	Nicolás Silbert and Leandro Mark	19 de septiembre	
Caíto	Guillermo Pfening	17 de octubre	
Calles de la memoria	Carmen Guarini	4 de julio	
Carne de neón	Paco Cabezas	21 de febrero	
La carpa invisible. Familia de circo	Juan Imassi	28 de noviembre	
El chantaje de un hombre solo	Leonel Compagnet	5 de diciembre	
La chica del sur	José Luis García	7 de febrero	
Cirquera	Andrés Habegger and Diana Rutkus	11 de julio	
Copa Hombre Nuevo	Esteban Giachero	30 de mayo	
Corazón de León	Marcos Carnevale	15 de agosto	
Cracks de nácar	Daniel Casabé	7 de febrero	
Cuando yo te vuelva a ver	Rodolfo Durán	23 de mayo	
La culpa del cordero	Gabriel Drak	7 de febrero	
D - F
De martes a martes	Gustavo "Chus" Triviño	3 de octubre	
Desierto verde	Ulises de la Orden	7 de noviembre	
Diagnóstico esperanza	César González	18 de julio	
Diario de Ana y Mía	Alejandra Martín	19 de diciembre	
Los días	Ezequiel Yanco	9 de marzo	
En busca de la ciudad perdida	Fernando Martínez	21 de noviembre	
Esclavo de Dios	Joel Novoa Schneider	12 de diciembre	
Esos colores que llevás	Federico Peretti	18 de julio	
Forajidos de la Patagonia	Damián Adalberto Leibovich	31 de enero	
El fruto	Patricio Pomares	31 de enero	
G - L
Germania	Maximiliano Schonfeld	21 de febrero	
Graba	Sergio Mazza	24 de enero	
El gran simulador	Néstor Frenkel	2 de mayo	
La Guayaba	Maximiliano González	31 de octubre	
La guerra del fracking	Pino Solanas	17 de octubre	Documental
Habi, la extranjera	María Florencia Álvarez	7 de julio	
Hermanos de sangre	Daniel de la Vega	6 de junio	Drama
Huellas	Miguel Colombo	12 de diciembre	
Imágenes del Tío Sam	Daniel Stefanello	4 de abril	
Imágenes paganas	Sergio Costantino	3 de octubre	
Incayal, la negación de nuestra identidad	Myriam Angueira	26 de septiembre	
Kartun, el año de Salomé	Monica Salerno y Hugo Crexell	4 de julio	Documental
Leones	Jazmín López	9 de mayo	
La llamada	David Nieto Wenzel	24 de enero	
El loro y el cisne	Alejo Moguillansky	31 de octubre	
Los quiero a todos	Luciano Quilici	10 de octubre	
Lunas cautivas	Marcia Paradiso	25 de julio	
M - O
Mala	Adrián Caetano	14 de febrero	
Mal del viento	Ximena González	25 de julio	
Malditos sean!	Fabián Forte	3 de enero	
Mar del Plata	Ionathan Klajman	7 de noviembre	
Martin Blaszko III	Ignacio Masllorens	4 de mayo	
Matrimonio	Carlos Jaureguialzo	21 de marzo	
La memoria del muerto	Javier Diment	28 de marzo	
Memorias cruzadas	Lucía Murat	28 de noviembre	
Mercedes Sosa, la voz de Latinoamérica	Rodrigo Vila	6 de junio	Documental
Metegol	Juan José Campanella	18 de julio	
La muerte conoce tu nombre	Daniel de la Vega	28 de febrero	
Mujer conejo	Verónica Chen	28 de noviembre	
La multitud	Martín Oesterheld	14 de febrero	
Natal	Sergio Mazza	7 de febrero	
La noche del chihuahua	Guillermo Grillo	8 de mayo	
Nos habíamos ratoneado tanto	Marcelo Raimon	19 de septiembre	
Omisión	Marcelo Páez-Cubells	28 de noviembre	
P - Z
Paisajes devorados	Eliseo Subiela	4 de julio	
Palmera	Leo Damario	8 de enero	
Para los pobres piedras	Mathieu Orcel	6 de junio	Documental
La pasión de Michelangelo	Esteban Larrain	20 de junio	
Pies en la tierra	Mario Pedernera	17 de octubre	
P3ND3JO5	Raúl Perrone	12 de septiembre	
Por un tiempo	Gustavo Garzón	25 de abril	
Príncipe azul	Jorge Polaco	26 de septiembre	
El Provincial	Daniel Guzmán	7 de noviembre	Documental
Puerta de Hierro, el exilio de Perón	Víctor Laplace y Dieguillo Fernández	11 de abril	Documental
Quiero morir en tus brazos	Víctor Jorge Ruiz	29 de agosto	
¿Quién mató a Mariano Ferreyra?	Alejandro Rath y Julián Morcillo	4 de abril	Documental
La reconstrucción	Juan Taratuto	28 de marzo	
Roa	Andrés Baiz	18 de abril	
Road July	Gaspar Gómez	22 de agosto	
Rosalinda	Matías Piñeiro	1 de agosto	
Rouge amargo	Gustavo Cova	23 de mayo	
Samurái	Gaspar Scheuer	6 de junio	
Séptimo	Patxi Amexcua	5 de septiembre	
Simón, el hijo del pueblo	Rolando Goldman y Julián Troksberg	2 de mayo	
Sola contigo	Alberto Lecchi	14 de noviembre	
Sólo para dos	Roberto Santiago	12 de septiembre	
Sólo para payasos	Lucas Martelli	25 de julio	
Teen Angels: El adiós	Juan Manuel Jiménez	30 de mayo	
Tesis sobre un homicidio	Hernán Goldfrid	17 de enero	
Tlatelolco, verano del 68	Carlos Bolado	10 de octubre	
La toma	Sandra Gugliotta	24 de octubre	
TV Utopía	Sebastián Deus	30 de mayo	
Últimas vacaciones en familia	Nicolás Teté	1 de agosto	
Una familia gay	Maximiliano Pelosi	5 de diciembre	
Un paraíso para los malditos	Alejandro Montiel	7 de noviembre	
Vacaciones con Fidel	Tristán Noblia	24 de octubre	
La vida anterior	Ariel Broitman	18 de abril	
Vidrios	Ignacio Bollini	7 de noviembre	
Villa	Ezio Massa	14 de febrero	
Villegas	Gonzalo Tobal	28 de febrero	
Vino para robar	Ariel Winograd	1 de agosto	
Viola	Matías Piñeiro	1 de agosto	
Visiones	Juan De Francesco	12 de septiembre	
Yo aborto. Tu abortas. Todxs callamos	Carolina Reynoso	7 de noviembre	
