= List of Argentine films of 2009 =

This is a list of films produced in Argentina in 2009.

Argentine films of 2009
Title	Director	Release	Genre
A - C
Algún lugar en ninguna parte	Víctor Dínenzon	6 of August	
Alicia y John, el peronismo olvidado	Carlos Castro	12 of November	Documentary
El Amarillo	Sergio Mazza	3 of December	
Amorosa soledad	Victoria Galardi y Martín Carranza	5 of March	
Anita	Marcos Carnevale	27 of August	Comedia
Aparecidos	Paco Cabezas	3 of December	
El artista	Gastón Duprat y Mariano Cohn	28 of May	
La asamblea	Galel Maidana	6 of August	
Boogie, el aceitoso	Gustavo Cova		
Caja cerrada	Martín Solá	5 of February	
Campo Cerezo	Patricia Martín García	12 of September	
Cartas a Malvinas	Rodrigo Fernández	19 of March	
Cartas para Jenny	Diego Musiak	10 of December	
Los chicos desaparecen	Marcos Rodríguez	3 of September	Drama
100% lucha, el amo de los clones	Paulo Soria y Pablo Parés	16 of July	
Los 100 días que no conmovieron al mundo	Vanessa Ragone y Víctor Ramos	28 of May	
El corredor nocturno	Gerardo Herrero	29 of October	
Cuestión de principios	Rodrigo Grande	24 of September	Comedia
D - H
Días of May	Gustavo Postiglione	21 of May	History
Esperando la carroza 2	Gabriel Condron	2 of April	Comedia
La extranjera	Fernando Díaz	5 of November	Drama
Fantasma de Buenos Aires	Guillermo Grillo	26 of November	
Felicitas	Teresa Costantini	11 of June	Drama
Gallero	Sergio Mazza		Drama
Haroldo Conti, homo viator	Miguel Mato	4 of June	
Hielos míticos	Daniel O. Bazán		Documentary
Historias breves 5	Gastón Rothschild, Adriana Yurcovich, Laura Durán, Lía Dansker, Laura Citarella, Magalí Bayon, Martín Ladd, Fernando Saviamarina, Benjamín Naishtat y Sebastián Caulier	16 of April	Cortometrajes
El hombre que corría tras el viento	Juan Pablo Martínez	3 of September	Drama
Homero Manzi, un poeta en la tormenta	Eduardo Spagnuolo	24 of September	Documentary
Horizontal/Vertical	Nicolás Tuozzo	22 of October	
I - M
Imagen final	Andrés Habegger		Documentary
La invención de la carne	Santiago Loza	19 of November	
Laberintos de hielo	Miguel Angel Rossi	diciembre	
Legión, tribus urbanas motorizadas	José Campusano	3 of September	
Los ángeles	Juan Baldana		Drama
Luisa	Gonzalo Calzada	7 of May	Drama
Manuel de Falla, músico de dos mundos	José Luis Castiñeira de Dios	30 of April	Documentary
Marea de arena	Gustavo Montiel Pagés	1 of October	
Los marinos del pueblo	Carlos Alberto Pico y Miguel Ángel Curci		Documentary
Mentiras piadosas	Diego Sabanés	20 of August	
¡Me robaron el papel picado!	Aníbal Di Salvo	25 of June	
Mundo alas	León Gieco, Fernando Molnar y Sebastián Schindel	26 of March	
Música en espera	Hernán A. Goldfrid	19 of March	Comedia
N - R
Naranjo en flor	Antonio González Vigil	1 of October	
El niño pez	Lucía Puenzo	9 of April	
Nunca estuviste tan adorable	Mausi Martínez	8 of October	Comedia
Los ojos cerrados de América Latina	Miguel Mirra		Documentary
Papá por un día	Raúl Rodríguez Peila	6 of August	Comedia
Parador Retiro	Jorge Leandro Colás		Documentary
Porotos de soja	David Blaustein y Osvaldo Daicich	21 of May	
Puentes o Bridges	Julián Giulianelli		
El ratón Pérez 2	Andrés G. Schaer	1 of January	
Regreso a Fortín Olmos	Patricio Coll y Jorge Goldemberg	5 of March	
Return to Bolivia	Mariano Raffo	2 of July	
Rodney	Diego Rafecas	5 of March	
S - Z
La sangre brota	Pablo Fendrik	14 of May	
Sangre del Pacífico	Boy Olmi	12 of November	Drama
El secreto de sus ojos	Juan José Campanella	13 of August	Drama
Silencios	Mercedes García Guevara	17 of December	
El sueño del perro	Paulo Pécora	En septiembre	
Test	Javier Mollo		
Tierra sublevada: oro impuro	Pino Solanas	10 of September	Documentary
Toda la gente sola	Santiago Giralt	18 of June	
El torcán	Gabriel Arregui	5 of November	
Tres deseos	Vivian Imar y Marcelo Trotta	5 of November	
El último aplauso	German Kral	3 of December	Musical
El último mandado	Fabio Junco y Julio Midú	8 of October	
El último verano de la Boyita	Julia Solomonoff	5 of November	Drama
Una semana solos	Celina Murga	11 of June	Drama
Un lugar lejano	José Ramón Novoa		
Unidad 25	Alejo Hoijman		Documentary
La ventana	Carlos Sorín	12 of March	
El vestido	Paula de Luque	17 of September	Comedia
Los viajes del viento	Ciro Guerra	11 of February	
Las viudas de los jueves	Marcelo Piñeyro	10 of September	Drama

== See also ==
- 2009 in Argentina
