= Luciano Cáceres =

Argentine actor

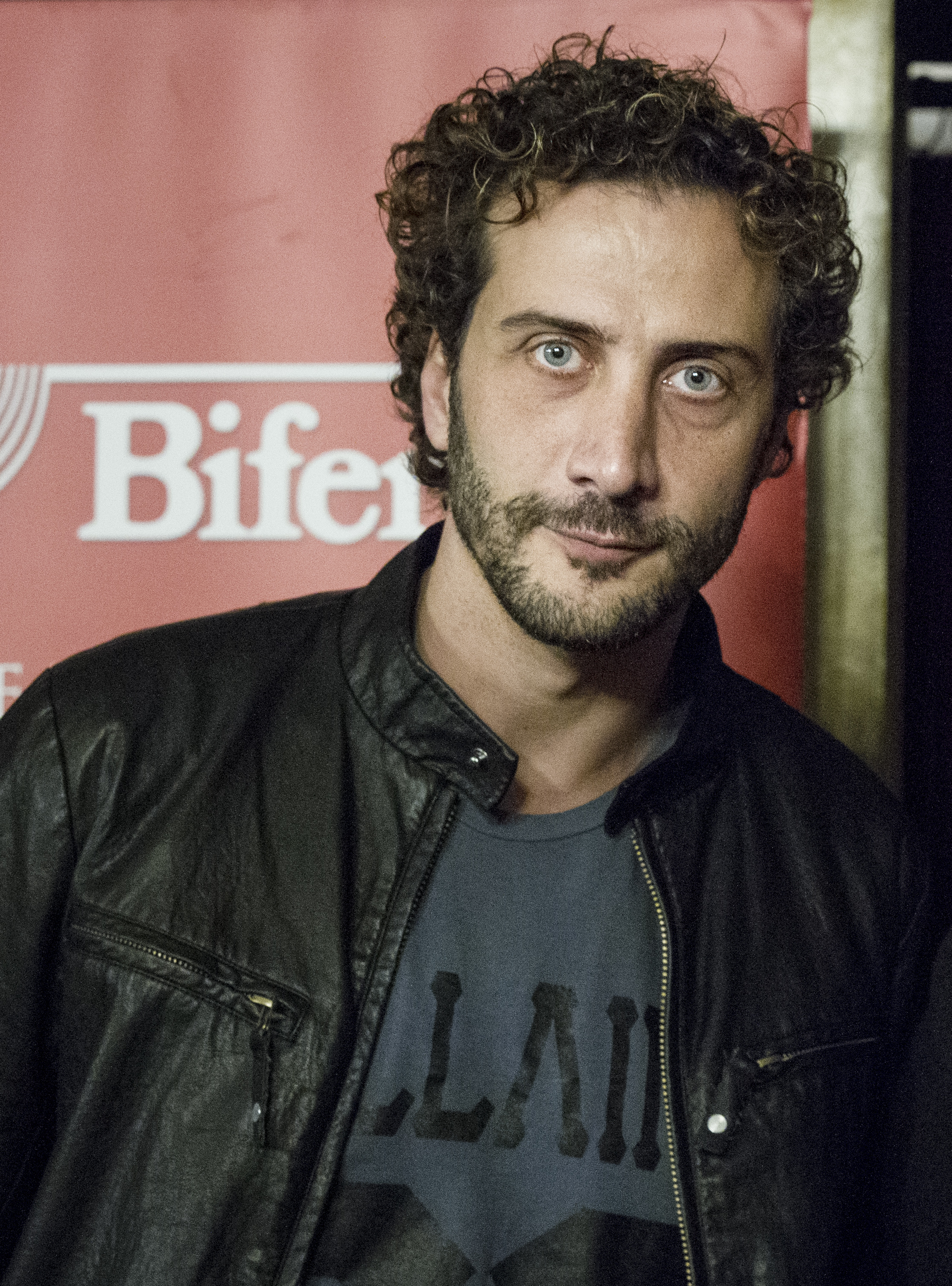
- Luciano Cáceres in 2017
- Born: January 24, 1977 (age 49); Flores, Buenos Aires, Argentina
- Occupation: Actor
- Years active: 1998–present
- Height: 1.89 m (6 ft 2 1/2 in)
- Spouse: Gloria Carrá (2008–2015)
- Children: Amelia Cáceres Curra (b. 2009)

Luciano Cáceres (born January 24, 1977, in Flores, Buenos Aires, Argentina) is an Argentine actor. He is primarily known for exclusively playing villain roles in most of the telenovelas he appears on.

== Early life ==
His father had an independent theater, Teatro de la calle Rincón. He worked in the municipality and lived in the province. He stayed there and had a mattress under the stage. His mother was a co-worker in the municipality and had been married for nine years to an engineer. When Cáceres was a child, he watched his father work. He performed in a play called El hombre y sus muñecos and had already learned the librettos. Cáceres completed his secondary studies at the Instituto Medalla Milagrosa. At eleven he began to work in theater.

== Career ==
When he was nine years old, the Pharmaceutical Union opened a free course and Cáceres attended. He studied with Alejandra Boero and at age ten, when he met her, Boero asked him why he wanted to be an actor. Some time later his son Alejandro Samek premiered the play Heredarás el viento, which was the first play in which he performed.

In 2012, he starred in Graduados, a popular telenovela on Telefe, where he starred alongside Daniel Hendler and Nancy Dupláa.

In 2016, he starred in the Argentine crime thriller series, Estocolmo, alongside Juana Viale and Esteban Lamothe. It was the first Argentine series made for Netflix.

=== Stage ===
In 2023, he starred in Elsa Tiro in Buenos Aires retelling the story of Eugene O'Neill's time in the city in 1910.

Between 2023 and 2024, he starred in the comedy play, El Beso (The Kiss), which gained much media attention for his kiss with co-star, Luciano Castro.

== Personal life ==
He was previously married to Gloria Carrá, with whom he has a daughter, Amelia. The pair separated in 2015, before divorcing a year later.

He met his current partner, Belén Riva in 2020. They met amid the COVID-19 pandemic as Cáceres took online yoga classes and Riva was his teacher.

His father spent his final years in Venezuela and fathered a child, Cáceres' half-sister, whom Cáceres has never met.

== Television ==
Year	Title	Character	Channel
1998	Gasoleros	Nicolás	Canal 13
1999	Por el nombre de Dios		Canal 13
1999	El hombre	Horacio Calderón	Canal 13
2000	Primicias	Sicario	Canal 13
2001-2002	El sodero de mi vida	Diego/Franco	Canal 13
2003	Son amores	Laura's boyfriend	Canal 13
2004	Locas de amor	Emanuel	Canal 13
2004	El deseo	Álvaro	Telefe
2005	¿Quien es el jefe?	Diego Dolan	Telefe
2005	Amor en custodia	Julián Valle	Telefe
2005	Algo habrán hecho por la historia argentina	Juan Manuel de Rosas	Canal 13
2005	Criminal	Rapist	Canal 9
2006	El tiempo no para	Marcos	Canal 9
2006	Doble venganza	Ismael Hassan	Canal 9
2006	Se dice amor	Juan	Telefe
2006	Hermanos y detectives	Claudio Torales	Telefe
2006	Mujeres asesinas	Padre Ignacio	Canal 13
2007-2008	Patito feo	Germán	Canal 13
2007	9 mm	Sicario	Ciudad Abierta
2008-2009	Atracción x4 en Dream Beach	Torino	Canal 13
2009	La Mandrágora	General Alta Gracia	TVE
2009-2010	Botineras	"El Mono"	Telefe
2010	Lo que el tiempo nos dejó	Emmanuel Soria	Telefe
2010	Colpo di fulmine		RAI
2010	Sin tetas no hay paraíso	Centoni	RAI
2011	El elegido	David Nevares Sosa	Telefe
2011	Volver al ruedo	Martín	Canal 13
2012	Graduados	Pablo Catáneo	Telefe
2013	Historias de corazón	Gastón	Telefe
2014	Sres. Papis	Franco Bertossi	Telefe
2015	Signos	Ricardo Félix	Canal 13
2016	Los ricos no piden permiso	Marcial Campos	Canal 13
2017	Estocolmo	Franco Bernal	Netflix
2017	Fanny la fan	Emiliano Morante	Telefe
2018	100 días para enamorarse	Nicolás “Nicky” Pianiza	Telefe
2019	Argentina, tierra de amor y venganza	Julio Salaberry	Canal 13
2019	Impuros		FOX
2020	Inconvivencia		Telefe
2021	1-518		Canal 13
2023-2024	Buenos chicos	Juan Paz	Canal 13

== Movies ==
Year	Movie	Character	Director	Notes	Ref.
2001	Rodrigo, la película	Ramiro	Juan Pablo Laplace		
2001	La ciudad del Sol	Diego	Carlos Galettini		
2004	Leviatán: el juego	Unknown	Analía Mateos		
2005	El amor - primera parte	Pedro	Alejandro Fadel		
2007	Garúa	Garúa	Gustavo Corrado		
2007	La señal	Dino Capuano	Ricardo Darín		
2007	Encarnación	Roberto	Anahí Berneri		
2009	El corredor nocturno	Mario Polansky	Gerardo Herrero		
2009	Aparecidos	Manuel	Paco Cabezas		
2009	Lucky Luke	Secuaz	James Huth		
2010	La mosca en la ceniza	Oscar	Gabriela David		
2012	Uno	Sebastián Oviedo	Dieguillo Fernández		
2013	Carne de neón	The kid	Paco Cabezas		
2013	Rouge amargo	Julián	Gustavo Cova		
2013	Mujer conejo	Alonso	Verónica Chen		
2014	Gato negro	Tito	Gastón Gallo		
2014	Fermín	Fermín Turdera (Young)	Hernán Findling and Oliver Kolker		
2014	Amapola	Tincho	Eugenio Zanetti		
2016	To Steal from a Thief		Daniel Calparsoro		
2016	Las Ineses		Pablo José Meza		
2016	Operación México, un pacto de amor	Tulio "Tucho" Valenzuela			
2017	Punto muerto		Daniel de la Vega		
2017	El jardín de la clase media				
2018	El azote del diablo				
2019	Lobos		Rodolfo Durán		
2019	Blindado	Vitali	Eduardo Meneghelli		
2019	Happy Hour	Ricardo	Eduardo Albergaria		
2024	La noche que luché contra Dios	Jacob	Rodrigo Fernández Engler		
2024	Adiós Madrid	Ramiro		Also producer	
2025	The Whisper	Victor	Gustavo Hernández Ibañez		

== Awards and nominations ==
Year	Award	Category	Work	Result
2011	Silver Condor Awards	Best Supporting Actor	La mosca en la ceniza	Winner
2011	Martín Fierro Awards	Best Supporting Actor	El elegido	Nominated
2012	Tato Awards	Actor in Daily Fiction	Graduados	Nominated
2013	Martín Fierro Awards	Best Leading Actor in Daily Fiction	Graduados	Nominated
2017	Martín Fierro Awards	Best Leading Actor in Daily Fiction	Los ricos no piden permiso	Nominated
