= Palmero (surname) =

Palmero is a surname. Notable people with the surname include:

- Anita Palmero (1902 – 1987) was a Spanish cabaret and tango singer, actress
- Emilio Palmero (1895 - 1970), Cuban Major League Baseball pitcher
- Diego Palmero, (born 1951), Mexican politician affiliated with the National Action Party
- Jean Palméro (1912 – 1999), French politician
- María José Guerra Palmero (born 1962), Spanish philosopher, writer and feminist theorist
- Rafael Palmero Ramos (1936 – 2021), Spanish Roman Catholic prelate
- Víctor Palmero (born 1989), Spanish actor

== See also ==
- Palmero (disambiguation)
- Palmieri
