= Sixteen Tons (disambiguation) =

"Sixteen Tons" is a 1947 song by Merle Travis which was also recorded by Tennessee Ernie Ford.

Sixteen Tons or 16 Tons may also refer to:

== Music ==
- Sixteen Tons, a 1960 album by Tennessee Ernie Ford
- Sixteen Tons of Bluegrass, a 1966 album by Pete Stanley and Wizz Jones
- Sixteen Tons, a 2003 album by Weedeater
- Sixteen Tons (Ten Songs), a 2005 album by Eels

== Other ==
- Caseros Prison Demolition Project – 16 Tons, an artwork by Seth Wulsin
- Sixteen Tons Entertainment, a German computer game development company
- Sixteen Tons (club), rock music club, Moscow
