= List of awards and nominations received by Héctor Babenco =

This is a list of awards and nominations received by Héctor Babenco, an award-winning Brazilian film director.

== Awards and nominations ==
=== Academy Awards ===
Year	Film	Category	Result
1986	Kiss of the Spider Woman	Best Director	Nominated

=== Argentine Academy of Cinematography Arts and Sciences Awards ===
Year	Film	Category	Result
2008	El pasado	Best Screenplay	Nominated

=== Bangkok International Film Festival ===
Year	Film	Category	Result
2004	Carandiru	Best Film	Nominated

=== Cannes Film Festival ===
Year	Film	Category	Result
2003	Carandiru	Palme d'Or	Nominated
1998	Corazón iluminado	Palme d'Or	Nominated
1985	Kiss of the Spider Woman	Palme d'Or	Nominated

=== Cartagena Film Festival ===
Year	Film	Category	Result
2004	Carandiru	Best Film	Won

=== Chicago International Film Festival ===
Year	Film	Category	Result
2014	Words with Gods	Audience Choice Award	Nominated

=== Cinema Brazil Grand Prize ===
Year	Film	Category	Result
2004	Carandiru	Best Director	Won
2000	Corazón iluminado	Best Director	Nominated

=== Gramado Film Festival ===
Year	Film	Category	Result
1978	Lúcio Flávio, o Passageiro da Agonia	Best Film	Nominated

=== Havana Film Festival ===
Year	Film	Category	Result
2003	Carandiru	Special Jury Prize	Won

=== Locarno Festival ===
Year	Film	Category	Result
1981	Pixote	Silver Leopard	Won

=== Los Angeles Film Critics Association Awards ===
Year	Film	Category	Result
1981	Pixote	Best Foreign Film	Won

=== Moscow International Film Festival ===
Year	Film	Category	Result
1989	Ironweed	Golden St. George	Nominated

=== National Society of Film Critics Awards ===
Year	Film	Category	Result
1982	Pixote	Best Director	3rd place

=== Rome Film Festival ===
Year	Film	Category	Result
2007	El pasado	Golden Marc'Aurelio Award	Nominated

=== San Sebastián International Film Festival ===
Year	Film	Category	Result
1981	Pixote	OCIC Award - Honorable Mention	Won

=== São Paulo International Film Festival ===
Year	Film	Category	Result
1977	Lúcio Flávio, o Passageiro da Agonia	Best Feature	Won

=== Taormina Film Fest ===
Year	Film	Category	Result
1978	Lúcio Flávio, o Passageiro da Agonia	Golden Charybdis	Nominated

=== Tokyo International Film Festival ===
Year	Film	Category	Result
1985	Kiss of the Spider Woman	Special Jury Distinguished Award	Won
