= Palmera (disambiguation) =

Palmera may refer to:

- Palmera, municipality in the comarca of Safor in the Valencian Community, Spain
- Palmera (film), 2013 Argentine independent film
- Palmera cattle, endangered breed of cattle from the island of San Miguel de La Palma, Canary Islands
- Palmera City, a fictional city in the DC Universe, home of Jaime Reyes / Blue Beetle

== See also ==
- Palmero (disambiguation)
