= The Appeared =

2007 film by Paco Cabezas

- Film poster
- Spanish: Aparecidos
- Directed by: Paco Cabezas
- Written by: Paco Cabezas
- Starring: Ruth Díaz; Javier Pereira
- Cinematography: Andreu Rebés
- Edited by: Fernando Franco
- Music by: Óscar Araujo
- Production companies: Jaleo Films; Oberón Cinematográfica; Pensa & Rocca Producciones
- Release dates: October 5, 2007 (Sitges Film Festival); December 12, 2008 (Spain); December 3, 2009 (Argentina)
- Running time: 120 minutes
- Countries: Spain; Argentina
- Language: Spanish

The Appeared (Spanish: Aparecidos) is a 2007 Spanish-language horror film with thriller and road movie elements directed and written by Paco Cabezas. The movie had its world premiere on October 5, 2007, at the Sitges Film Festival and stars Ruth Díaz and Javier Pereira as two siblings in a journey across the Argentine Patagonia caught up in a horrific series of events.

== Synopsis ==
Siblings Malena and Pablo have decided to set out on a road trip to allow Pablo to discover more about their father, who is on life support. Their destination is the old family home in Argentina and initially the trip is fairly mundane. This all changes when Pablo discovers an old journal hidden within their car. The journal details a series of gruesome crimes and Pablo pushes for the two of them to travel to the various landmarks and places described in the journal while they are on their road trip. They end up stopping for the night at a hotel detailed in the journal, where the Leonardi family was brutally slaughtered. Pablo and Malena take the room adjacent to the room the Leonardis met their deaths and are horrified to overhear a spiritual reenactment of the murders. The siblings decide to flee but Pablo forgets the book and must return to retrieve it. This nearly ends with Pablo's death and when he has reached safety Pablo notices that some of the details in the book have changed, making him wonder if it is possible for him to change the past. However, as they travel Pablo finds that his quest to discover more about his father is bringing both siblings revelations that they are ill-prepared to deal with.

== Cast ==
- Ruth Díaz as Malena
- Javier Pereira as Pablo
- Pablo Cedrón as Gabriel De Luca
- Leonora Balcarce as Amalia Leonardi
- Héctor Bidonde as Daniel Lerhmann
- Paco Cabezas as TV Chainsaw Psycho Killer
- Dámaso Conde as Jimmy "Pinche" McLaine
- Luciano Cáceres as Manuel Leonardi
- Daniel Galanz as Cirujano joven
- Silvia Geijo as Camarera
- Carolina Hernández as Enfermera Centro Médico
- Darío Levy as Policía Principal
- Federico Marrale as Policía Joven
- Elisa Martín as Chica bosque
- Sergio Podeley as Hombre Depósito

== Release ==
The film was presented at the 40th Sitges Film Festival in October 2007. The theatrical release in Spain was set, after several delays, to December 12, 2008, whereas the theatrical release in Argentina was scheduled for December 3, 2009.

== Reception ==
Las Horas Perdidas gave a positive review for The Appeared and cited Ruth Díaz's acting as one of the film's highlights. HorrorNews.net also gave a favorable review and wrote that "Various plot twists keep the storyline alive, as the movie’s length of 120 minutes seems long but fitting for the story to develop in a shocking fashion." Den of Geek was more mixed in their review and commented that "Overall, it is a good effort, but with the obvious downfalls, and is hurt by one of the cheesiest endings I have ever witnessed. Still, it's definitely worth a watch, and while it's not a groundbreaking movie in any sense, it certainly has its moments." Nuria Vidal of Fotogramas scored 3 out of 5 stars, highlighting the setting where the film takes place as the best thing about it, likewise pointing out at the overly predictable plot outcome as the worst thing about it.

== See also ==
- List of Spanish films of 2008
- List of Argentine films of 2009
