= Estocolmo =

Argentine web television series

- Genre: Police procedural
- Created by: Nacho Viale; Diego Palacio
- Written by: Marcelo Camaño & Lucas Molteni
- Story by: Nacho Viale & Diego Palacio
- Directed by: Jesus Braceras
- Starring: Juana Viale; Luciano Cáceres; Esteban Lamothe
- Country of origin: Argentina
- Original language: Spanish
- No. of seasons: 1
- No. of episodes: 13

Production
- Production locations: Buenos Aires, Villa La Angostura, Argentina
- Production company: STORYLAB / KAPOW

Original release
- Network: Netflix
- Release: 11 November 2016

Estocolmo is an Argentine police procedural television series created by Diego Palacio and Nacho Viale, starring Juana Viale, Esteban Lamothe and Luciano Cáceres. First aired in November 2016, it is the first Argentine series made for Netflix although it has since been removed.

== Plot ==
The series take place in two time periods, one set three years after the events of the other, and each episode advances the plots set in each period. In the first time period, Rosario Santa Cruz (Juana Viale) is a famous television reporter, covering stories about victims of forced prostitution. Franco Vernal (Luciano Cáceres) is a prosecutor, working on those cases and trying to take down the human trafficking networks. His half-brother, known as "agent H" (Esteban Lamothe), works as a mole, infiltrating those networks. After members of the human trafficking network kidnap Rosario, agent H rescues her and kills all the members of the network during the escape. He turns into a vigilante, killing the staffs of entire cabarets to liberate the prostitutes held captive there. Franco is ordered to find and stop agent H, but refuses to kill him, and allows him to escape as long as he stays undercover while Franco reports him dead. In the second time period, Franco and Rosario are about to get married, and Franco runs for vice president for the conservative party, but their plans are complicated by the return of the agent H.

== Production ==
The series was created by Nacho Viale (brother of lead actress Juana Viale) and Diego Palacio, and it was shot in 2015 in the Buenos Aires Province and Villa La Angostura. The scenes in Villa La Angostura were filmed first. Juana Viale was still working at Bailando por un Sueño at the time, so her dancing partner and coach were taken to the production site as well, so that she could practice dancing at night.

The series was filmed aiming for the international market, but not specifically for Netflix. Netflix contacted the production during the post-production stage. Nacho Viale said that it was an honor to produce the first Argentine TV series to premier on Netflix, but that he is also aware that it will have to compete with very important series.

Nacho Viale revealed that the scripts for a second season are already written, but it would only be produced if the series has a positive reception.

== Reception ==
The first season received mixed reviews from viewers. On Imdb an average rating of 6.1/10 while in filmaffinity has a user score of 4,8. The general consensus is that the series has interesting ideas but that they are poorly executed and the acting is mediocre.
