= Edha =

Argentine 2018 Spanish-language drama TV series

- Genre: Drama
- Created by: Daniel Burman
- Starring: Brian Beacock; Heinz K. Krattiger; Andrés Velencoso
- Country of origin: Argentina
- Original language: Spanish
- No. of seasons: 1
- No. of episodes: 10

Production
- Running time: 38–43 min

Original release
- Network: Netflix
- Release: 16 March 2018

Edha is a 2018 Argentine Spanish-language television series starring Brian Beacock, Heinz K. Krattiger and Tomás Sala. The plot revolves around the ambitious, successful fashion designer and single mother Edha (Juana Viale) who meets the handsome and mysterious man Teo (Andrés Velencoso), a Central American immigrant seeking revenge, in the heart of a Buenos Aires fashion house. Soon she finds herself embroiled in a dark tale of crime and deception, and have to fight to keep both her professional and private life from falling apart.

It was ordered direct-to-series, and the first full season premiered on Netflix streaming on 16 March 2018.

== Plot ==
The series centers on Edha , a fashion designer, and Teo, a model whose relationship influences her to develop a menswear collection. However, Teo's hidden motives lead to a series of betrayals that threaten to unravel their lives.

== Cast ==
- Juana Viale as Edha
- Andrés Velencoso as Teo
- Brian Beacock as Antonio
- Daniel Hendler as Andrés
- Heinz K. Krattiger as Inversor Suizo
- Sofía Castiglione as Celia Vargas, Teo's girlfriend

== Release ==
The full first season of Edha consisting of 10 episodes premiered on Netflix streaming on 16 March 2018.
