= The Whisper (film) =

- Theatrical release poster
- Spanish: El susurro
- Directed by: Gustavo Hernández Ibañez
- Written by: Juma Fodde
- Produced by: Ignacio García Cucucovich
- Starring: Luciano Cáceres; Ana Clara Guanco; Marcelo Michinaux
- Cinematography: Santiago Guzmán
- Edited by: Gustavo Hernández; Santiago Paiz
- Music by: Hernán González Villamil
- Production companies: Aramos Cine; Estudios NonStop; Machaco Films; Mother Superior
- Release dates: October 15, 2025 (Sitges); January 22, 2026 (Uruguay and Argentina)
- Running time: 100 minutes
- Countries: Uruguay; Argentina
- Languages: Spanish; Uruguayan Sign Language

The Whisper (Spanish: El susurro) is a 2025 horror film directed by Gustavo Hernández Ibañez and written by Juma Fodde. A co-production between Uruguay and Argentina, the film stars Luciano Cáceres, Ana Clara Guanco and Marcelo Michinaux.

The Whisper had its world premiere at the 58th Sitges Film Festival on 15 October 2025, where it competed for the Best Feature Film Award in the Secció Oficial Fantàstic a Competició.

== Synopsis ==
Siblings Lucía and Adrián seek refuge in a forest mansion, but a macabre discovery reveals that their neighbors are part of a criminal network that kidnaps teenagers to make snuff films.

== Cast ==
The actors participating in this film are:

- Ana Clara Guanco as Lucía
- Luciano Cáceres as Victor
- Marcelo Michinaux as Adrian
- Darío Lima
- Horacio Camandulle
- Rasjid César
- Joro Gorfain
- Machu Gutiérrez

== Release ==
The film premiered worldwide on October 15, 2025, at the 58th Sitges Film Festival, then screened on November 2 at the 18th Mórbido Fest, and on November 22 at Buenos Aires Rojo Sangre.

The film was commercially released on January 22, 2026, in Uruguayan and Argentinian theaters.

== Accolades ==
Award / Festival	Date of ceremony	Category	Recipient(s)	Result	Ref.
Sitges Film Festival	18 October 2025	Best Feature Film	The Whisper	Nominated	
Mórbido Fest	17 November 2025	Gold Skull	The Whisper	Won	
Buenos Aires Rojo Sangre	30 November 2025	Best Feature Film	The Whisper	Won	
Buenos Aires Rojo Sangre	30 November 2025	Best Director	Gustavo Hernández Ibañez	Won	
