= Parque Patricios =

Coordinates: 34°38′S 58°24′W

- Neighborhood of Buenos Aires
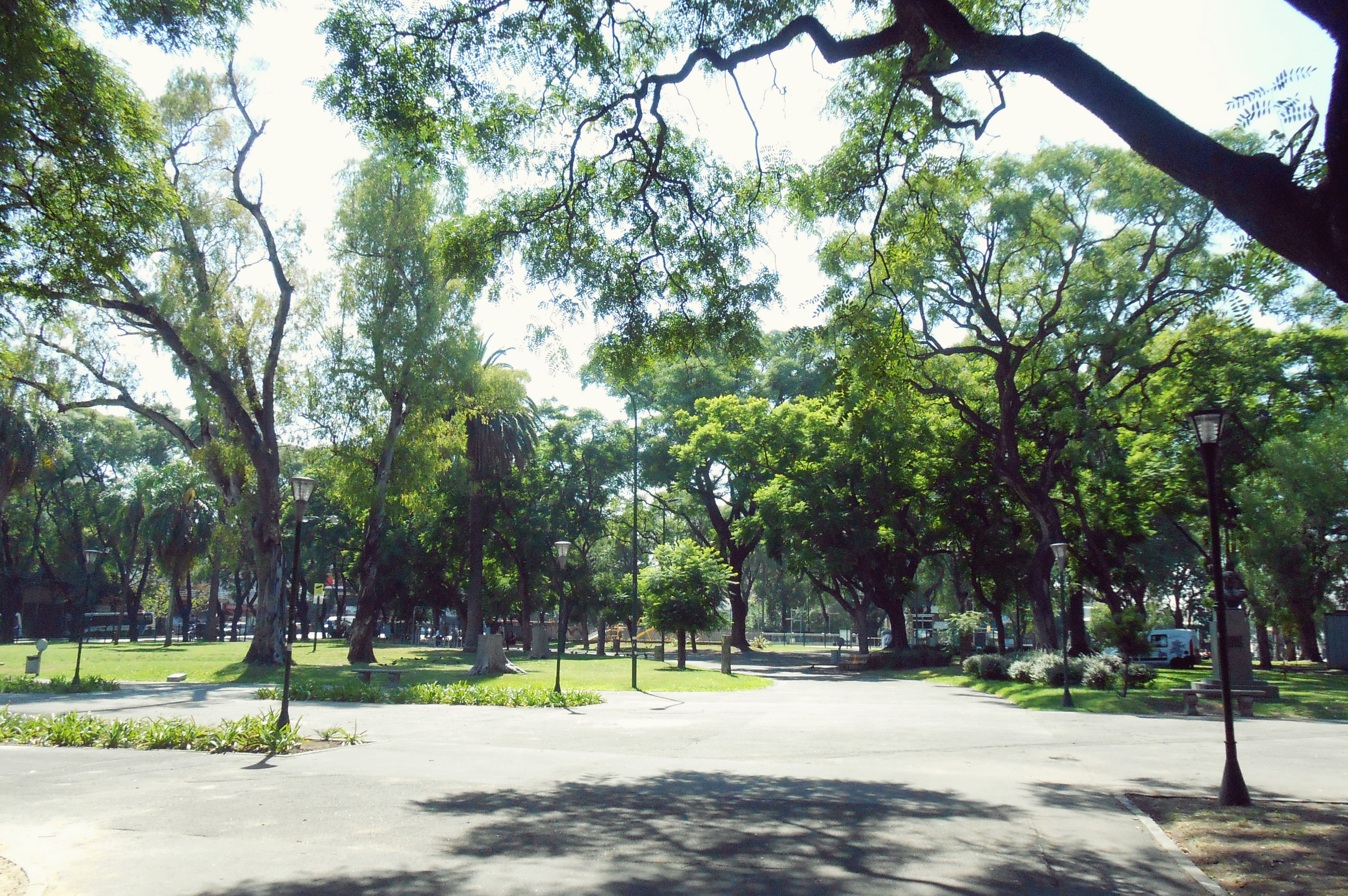
- Parque de los Patricios park

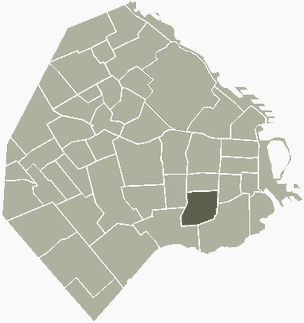
- Location of Parque Patricios within Buenos Aires
- Country: Argentina
- Autonomous City: Buenos Aires
- Comuna: C4
- Important sites: Caseros Prison, Caseros Prison Demolition Project, Estadio Tomás Adolfo Ducó

Area
  - Total: 3.8 km^{2} (1.5 sq mi)

Population (2001)
  - Total: 40,885
  - Density: 11,000/km^{2} (28,000/sq mi)
- Time zone: UTC-3 (ART)

Parque Patricios is a barrio located on the southern side of Buenos Aires, Argentina belonging to the fourth comuna.

Parque Patricios underwent a transformation during the beginning of the 1900s. The government moved the main slaughterhouse to Mataderos, removed refuse piles and the notorious trash incinerators ("la quema") and the cemetery used during the 1871 yellow fever epidemic, now Parque Ameghino. Parks, a zoo and hospitals were put in their place. Parque Patricios received its name from the park of the same name, designed by Carlos Thays, the French architect who designed many of the most distinctive parks in the north of the city including the Botanical Garden and Bosques de Palermo.

This barrio features many hospitals which treat patients from all parts of Argentina, as well as the notorious former Caseros Prison. It is also the home of Club Atlético Huracán, a First Division football team, and their stadium Estadio Tomás Adolfo Ducó. Parque Patricios is bordered by the barrios of Barracas and Nueva Pompeya to the south; Constitución to the east; San Cristóbal to the north; and Boedo to the west.

In more recent years, the area has received connections to Line H of the Buenos Aires Underground, in particular at Parque Patricios station, connecting it to the network for the first time.

The headquarters of the Government of Buenos Aires were moved to Parque Patricios in 2015, as part of a strategy to drive economic growth in the south and lessen the economic divide with the north of the city. The building was designed by British architect Norman Foster.

== Gallery ==
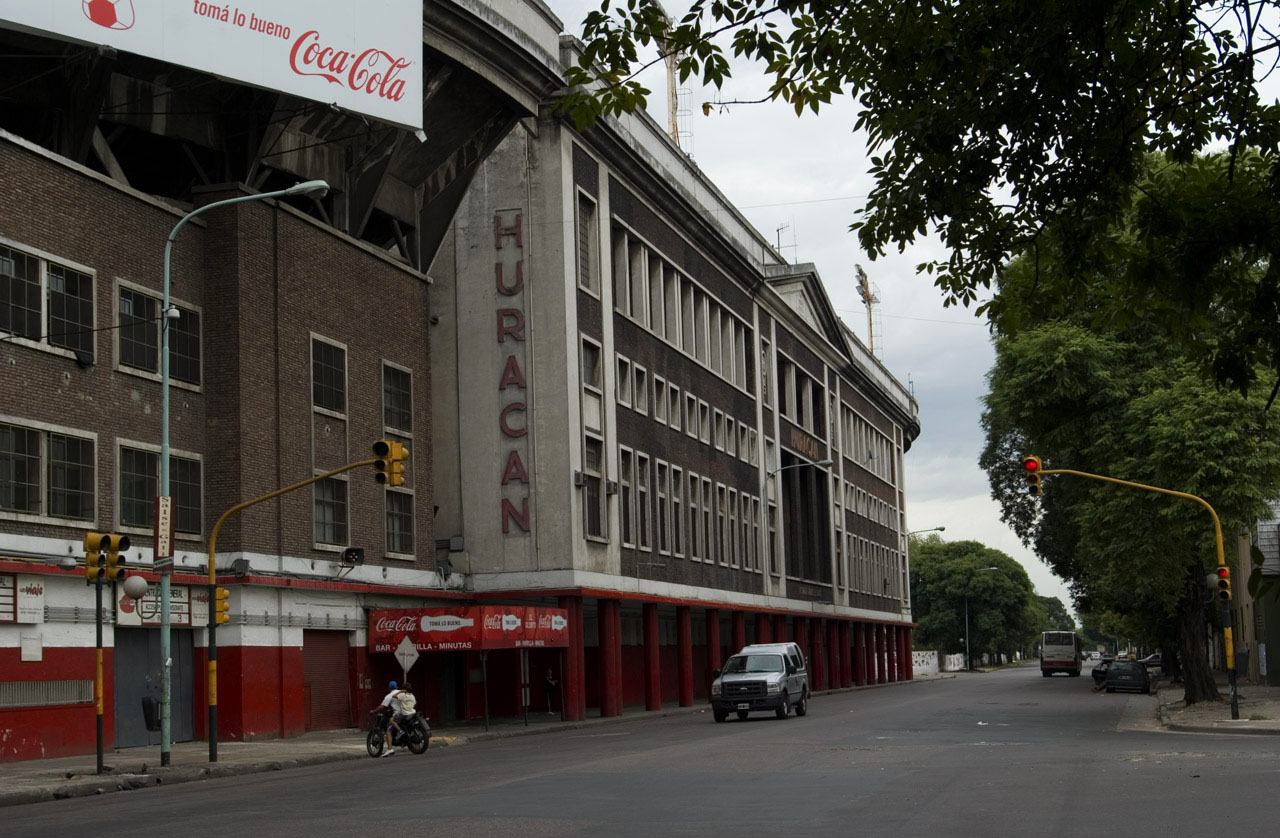
Estadio Tomás Adolfo Ducó, home of Club Atlético Huracán

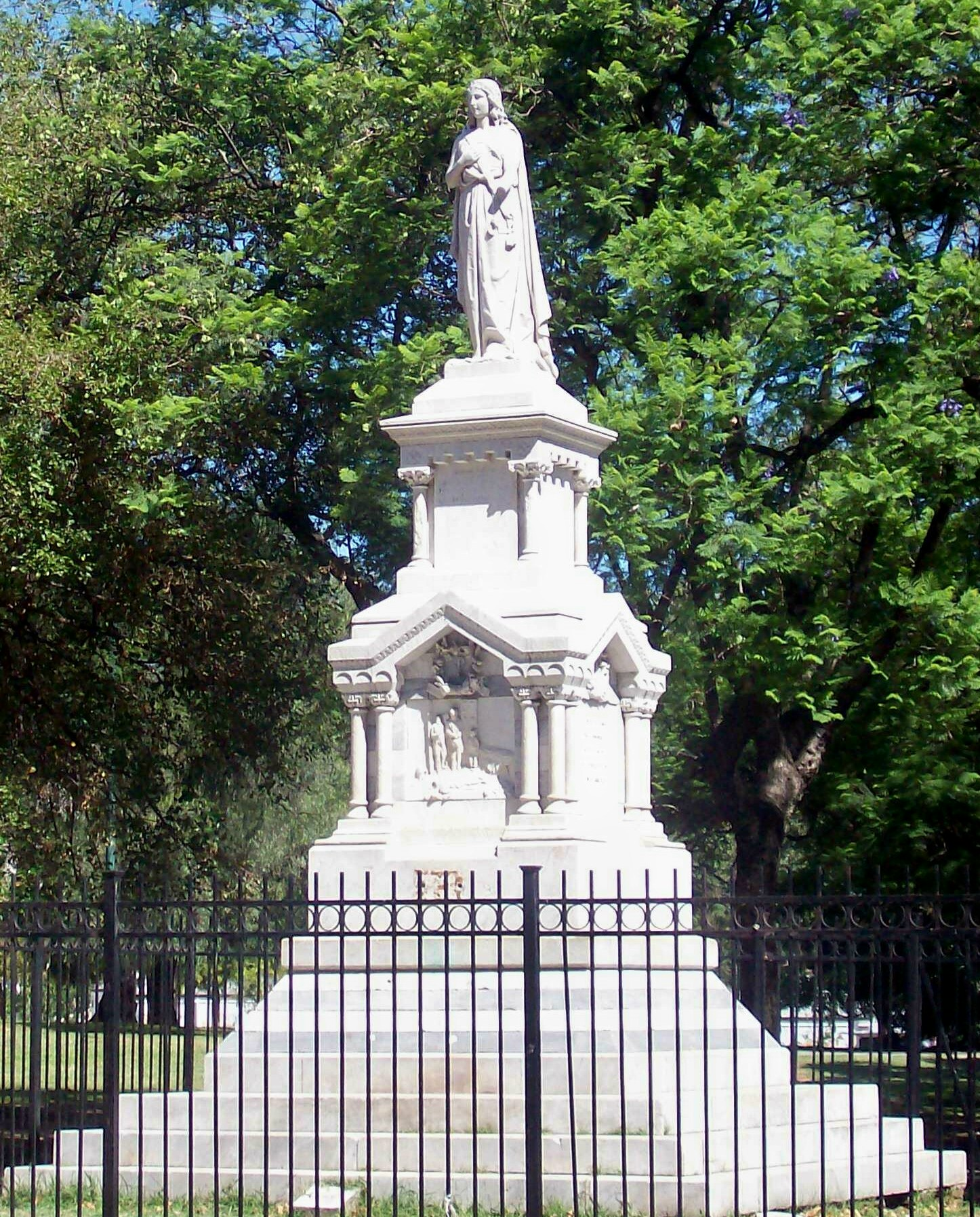
Monument to the Victims of the 1871 Yellow Fever Epidemic

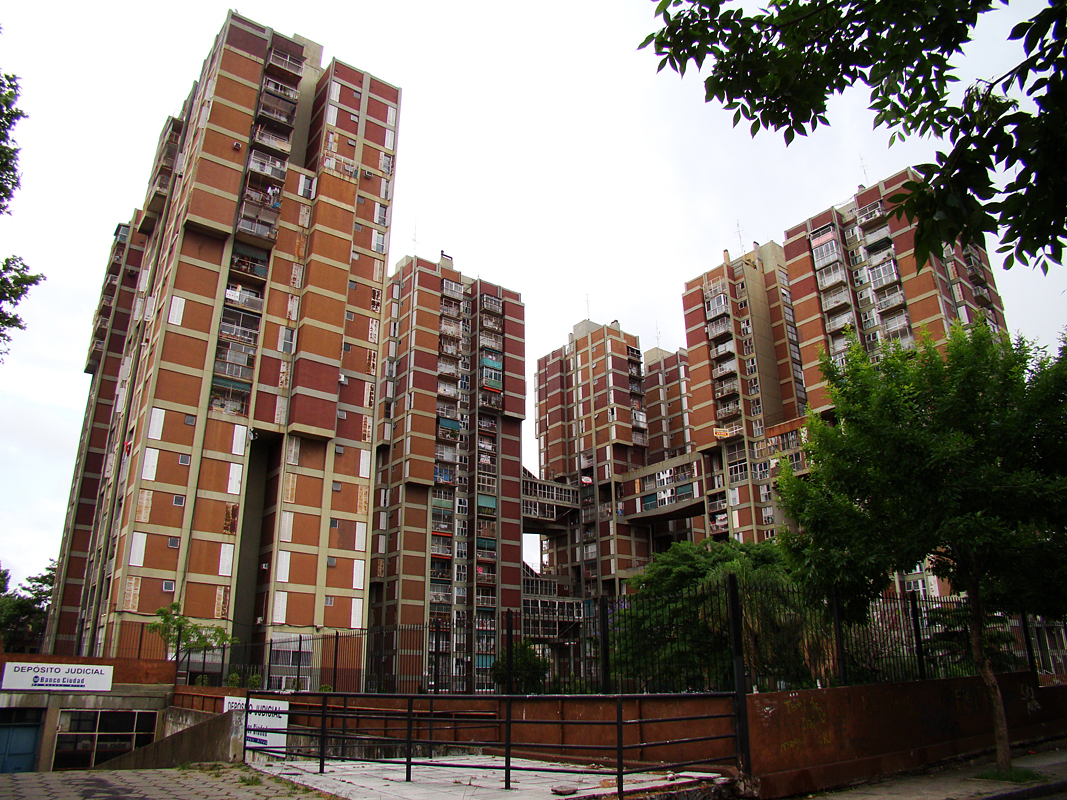
Social Housing

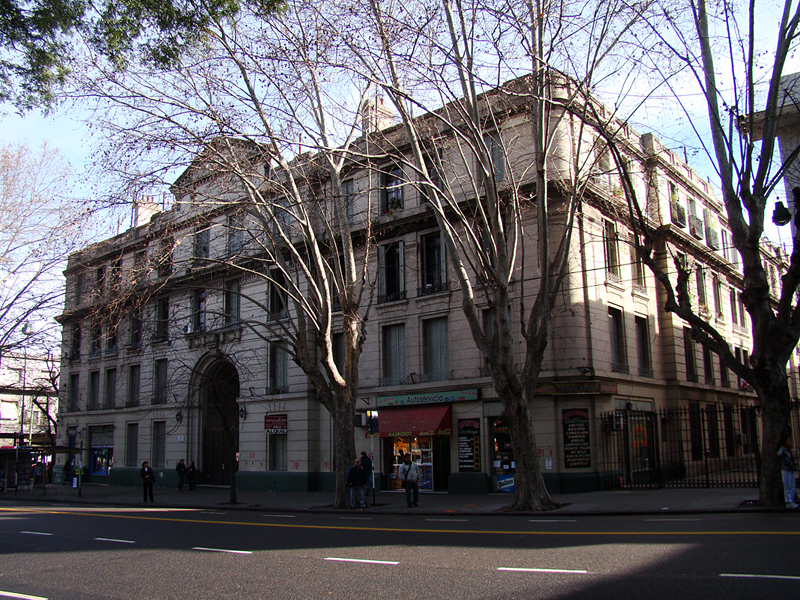
Casa Colectiva Valentín Alsina

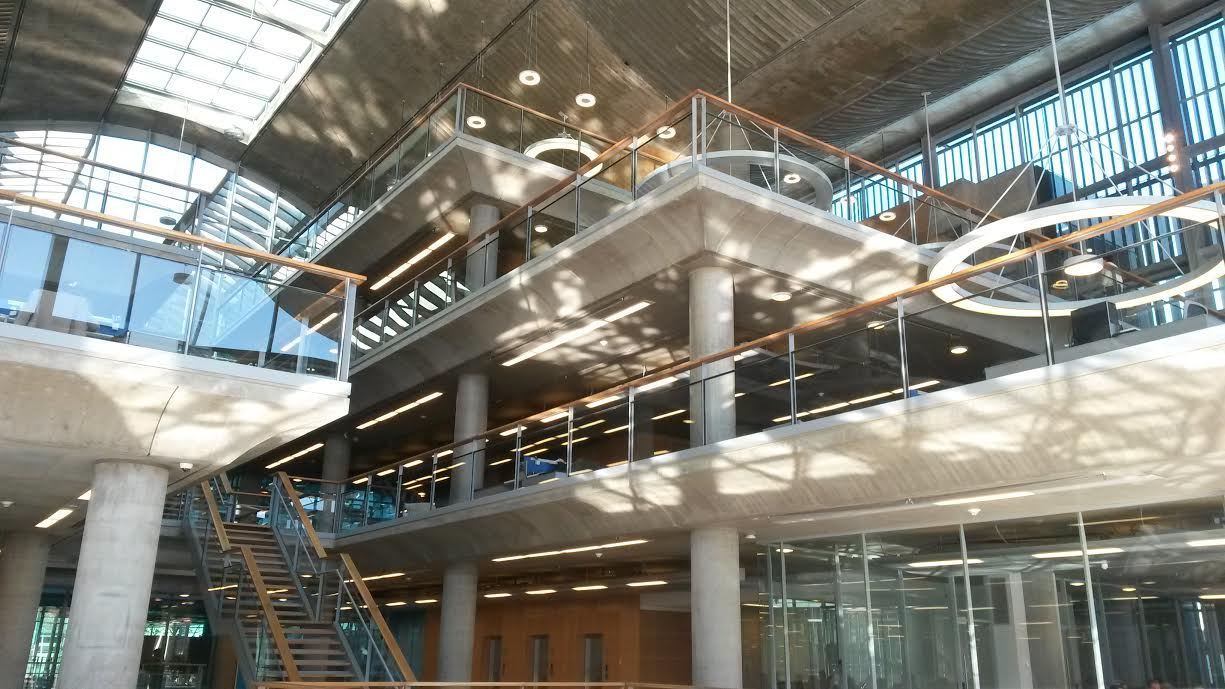
Interior of the Buenos Aires central government buildings

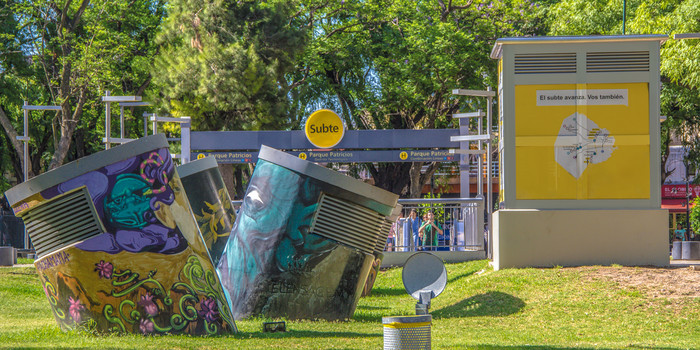
Air vents for Line H of the Buenos Aires Underground
