= Mr. Right (2015 film) =

2015 film by Paco Cabezas

- Theatrical release poster
- Directed by: Paco Cabezas
- Written by: Max Landis
- Produced by: Bradley Gallo; Michael A. Helfant; Rick Jacobs; Lawrence Mattis
- Starring: Sam Rockwell; Anna Kendrick; Tim Roth; James Ransone; Anson Mount; Michael Eklund; RZA
- Cinematography: Daniel Aranyó
- Edited by: Tom Wilson
- Music by: Aaron Zigman
- Production companies: Amasia Entertainment; Circle of Confusion
- Distributed by: Focus World
- Release dates: September 19, 2015 (TIFF); April 8, 2016 (United States)
- Running time: 95 minutes
- Country: United States
- Language: English
- Budget: $7.5 million
- Box office: $830,374

Mr. Right is a 2015 American romantic action comedy film directed by Paco Cabezas, written by Max Landis, and starring an ensemble cast featuring Sam Rockwell, Anna Kendrick, Tim Roth, James Ransone, Anson Mount, Michael Eklund, and RZA.

The film, which follows an overly optimistic young woman (Kendrick) who discovers that her new boyfriend (Rockwell) is a former professional hitman, was released in the United States on April 8, 2016, by Focus World.

== Plot ==
Ex-CIA agent and ex-mercenary Francis Munch kills those who try to hire him. On his way from such a kill, a team including Espinoza tries to kill him; his ex-partner and trainer Ed Hopper, reconsiders his involvement immediately beforehand, and remains only to listen and confirm his assessment of the situation.

Martha McKay is asked out by Munch and they are smitten. Munch dodges an assassination attempt by Espinoza, and they spend the night chastely. The next evening, they meet for dinner, where Munch reluctantly kills Espinoza when attacked. Over hot chocolate, he shows Martha his belief that underlying all physical objects lies a current that can be precognitively anticipated, and both of them have it. Munch throws a kitchen knife high in the air and catches it safely as it falls between them. Martha freaks out until he throws a knife at her, which she catches by the blade without being cut. They then have an intimate night.

"Von" Cartigan is the sole survivor of a prior spree in which Munch killed the Pirrello heroin syndicate, and, as Munch shoots those who hire him, with his partner Johnny Moon tries to set up his brother Richard to be killed. Instead, a middleman is sent who Munch kills in front of Martha, frightening her enough to ask him to give her some space. Richard sends Moon, Von, and 10 other hitmen to Martha's, including a gunman named Steve.

Hopper meets Martha at her apartment, but is subdued by Munch, his former partner. Steve gets Munch with birdshot. From cover, Munch shoots one of Von's hired men dead, talks another into leaving, and kneecaps the remainder. Having previously shown Von mercy at the Pirrello job, and, getting ready to kill Von, he's again hit by Steve (whom he respects for his skills) with a bat while Moon grabs Martha. Hopper arrives and shoots the kneecapped men dead, but while his back is turned, Munch escapes.

Richard enlists Von and Johnny to stay and defend their house, defeating their plans to rule the family as sole survivors; in frustration, they abuse Martha in response to her mockery. After being kicked against a wall, she says she will kill them if Munch doesn't, as she now feels "motivated."

Outside, Munch takes Steve by surprise; chatting, Steve tells him how many are inside, and they share gummy bears. Munch distracts Von and Richard's bodyguards and shoots them when threatened, but declines to shoot either Von or Richard themselves. In frustration, Von begins monologuing about his desire to kill his brother. When Munch leaves, both leap for the gun, but Von successfully kills Richard. In another room, Richard's consigliere Bruce confronts Munch but is disarmed. Bruce mistakenly arms a grenade, and Munch helps him disarm it.

Munch rescues and begins to escape with Martha, but is shot with beanbag ammunition by Hopper. Moon grabs Martha and tells her he puts more dangerous people off their game by killing their weaker loved ones. Her precognitive combat abilities awaken, and she dodges Moon's attacks, then strikes him with his own knife and kills him with a statue. While escaping, she disarms and shoots Von with his own gun.

Hopper and Munch confront each other, Hopper handcuffs himself to Munch, intending to "re-program" Munch into a killer. Munch shoots the handcuffs off. Before Hopper can shoot him in the back, Steve shoots him dead, and is ecstatic to learn of Hopper's $5 million bounty. Munch meets Martha at the entrance, notes her dilated pupils, and asks Steve to help him get them to the hospital.

Two months later, two military-style teams are pursuing Munch and Martha as they plan to visit different countries for Martha's paleontological interests; Munch shows a sign to a sniper asking "where's the girl?" as the scene cuts to Martha, who has snuck up to shoot the sniper.

== Cast ==
- Sam Rockwell as Francis Munch
- Anna Kendrick as Martha McKay
  - Gigi Johnson as Young Martha McKay
- Tim Roth as Hopper / Knox
- James Ransone as Von Cartigan
- Anson Mount as Richard Cartigan
- Michael Eklund as Johnny Moon
- Katie Nehra as Sophie
- RZA as Steve
- Jaiden Kaine as Bruce
- Douglas M. Griffin as Gus Patrick
- Luis Da Silva Jr. as Espinoza
- Elena Sanchez as Dison
- Garrett Kruithof as Gage
- Christopher Matthew Cook as Garrety
- Jonathan Billions as Little Boy Kyle
- Cooper Dodson as Little Boy Gordon
- Alec Rayme as Sniper

== Production ==
On October 8, 2011, it was announced in Variety that Paco Cabezas would direct the action-comedy film Mr. Right scripted by Max Landis and produced by Circle of Confusion's David Alpert and Lawrence Mattis. On May 5, 2014, Sam Rockwell and Anna Kendrick were announced for the lead roles. Michael Helfant and Bradley Gallo would finance the film for Amasia Entertainment and co-produce along with Circle of Confusion's Mattis and Rick Jacobs. On October 6, rapper RZA joined the cast. On October 7, Tim Roth joined the film. On October 8, James Ransone joined the film. On October 10, Anson Mount, Michael Eklund and Katie Nehra joined the cast.

=== Filming ===
Filming began on October 13, 2014, in New Orleans, Louisiana, and ran for seven weeks.

== Release ==
In October 2014, Lakeshore Entertainment announced its acquiring international distribution rights to the film, while Sierra/Affinity would handle international sales of the film at American Film Market. The film had its world premiere at the 2015 Toronto International Film Festival on September 19, as the closing night film. Before that, Focus World had acquired U.S. distribution rights to the film. The film was released in the U.S. on April 8, 2016.

== Reception ==
=== Critical response ===
On Rotten Tomatoes, the film has a rating of 44%, based on 52 reviews, with an average rating of 4.94/10 and the site's consensus: "Sam Rockwell and Anna Kendrick work well together, but Mr. Right is too much of a tonal jumble to take advantage of their chemistry". On Metacritic the film has a score of 52 out of 100, based on reviews from 17 critics, indicating "mixed or average reviews".

Richard Roeper of the Chicago Sun-Times described the film as "hard-R violent comedy in the tradition of "Grosse Pointe Blank". He also praised the lead performances, and the strong supporting performances. Kendrick's performance was praised by Alan Scherstuhl of The Village Voice, saying it was "a role that Anna Kendrick kills with such flamboyant style it makes all the movie's shootings look even more rote." Andy Webster in his New York Times review comments that "Anna Kendrick's star shows no sign of dimming".

Peter Debruge of Variety gave the film a negative review, writing, "Not an especially sustainable work model, professionally speaking (it’s murder on word-of-mouth, for starters), but then, this fixer is ready to make some changes in his own life, maybe even find romance with an on-the-rebound Anna Kendrick—which is where Max Landis’ ultra-cutesy script picks up, asking whether a character like that can find and sustain love ... or else die trying. For about a decade after Pulp Fiction, such quirky hit-man comedies were all the rage, though in the post-Gigli era, (the eerily similar) Mr. Right just feels wrong." Katie Walsh of the Los Angeles Times wrote: "It feels at once overwritten and thematically thin, coasting on a cutesy concept before descending into relentless, and therefore meaningless, violence."

=== Accolades ===
| Award | Category | Recipients | Result |
|---|---|---|---|
| Teen Choice Awards | Choice Movie: Comedy | | Nominated |
| Teen Choice Awards | Choice Movie Actress: Comedy | Anna Kendrick | Nominated |
