= The Widows of Thursdays =

- Spanish: Las viudas de los jueves
- Directed by: Marcelo Piñeyro
- Screenplay by: Marcelo Piñeyro; Marcelo Figueras
- Based on: Las viudas de los Jueves by Claudia Piñeiro
- Produced by: Gerardo Herrero
- Starring: Ernesto Alterio; Pablo Echarri; Leonardo Sbaraglia; Juan Diego Botto; Juana Viale; Gloria Carra; Ana Celentano; Gabriela Toscano
- Cinematography: Alfredo Mayo
- Edited by: Juan Carlos Macías
- Music by: Roque Baños
- Production companies: Tornasol Films; Castafiore Films; Haddock Films
- Release dates: 10 September 2009 (Argentina); 26 March 2010 (Spain)
- Running time: 122 min
- Countries: Argentina; Spain
- Language: Spanish

The Widows of Thursdays (Spanish: Las viudas de los jueves) is a 2009 Argentine-Spanish crime drama film directed by Marcelo Piñeyro and based on the novel of the same name by Claudia Piñeiro (published in English as Thursday Night Widows). It stars an ensemble cast consisting of Pablo Echarri, Leonardo Sbaraglia, Juan Diego Botto, Ernesto Alterio, Ana Celentano, Juana Viale, Gabriela Toscano and Gloria Carrá.

== Plot ==
Set in 2001 Argentina, the story focuses on a crime committed in a gated community and the secrets surrounding wealthy families who reside there.

== Cast ==
- Pablo Echarri as Tano
- Leonardo Sbaraglia as Ronnie
- Ernesto Alterio as Martín
- Juan Diego Botto as Gustavo
- Ana Celentano as Teresa
- Juana Viale as Carla
- Gabriela Toscano as Mavy
- Gloria Carrá as Lala
- Vera Spinetta as Trina
- Camilo Cuello Vitale as Juan
- Adrián Navarro as Security guard
- Roberto Antier as Apoderado

== Production ==
The film is a Tornasol Films, Castafiore Films, and Haddock Films coproduction. Shooting locations included the Ciudad de la Luz film studio in Alicante.

== Release ==
The film was released theatrically in Argentina on 10 September 2009 and in Spain on 26 March 2010.

== See also ==
- List of Argentine films of 2009
- List of Spanish films of 2010
