= Rage (2014 film) =

2014 film by Paco Cabezas

- Directed by: Paco Cabezas
- Written by: Jim Agnew; Sean Keller
- Produced by: Michael Mendelsohn; Richard Rionda Del Castro
- Starring: Nicolas Cage Rachel Nichols Max Ryan Michael McGrady Peter Stormare Pasha D. Lychnikoff Patrice Cols Weston Cage Max Fowler Aubrey Peeples Jack Falahee Danny Glover
- Cinematography: Andrzej Sekuła
- Edited by: Robert A. Ferretti
- Music by: Laurent Eyquem
- Production companies: Patriot Pictures; Hannibal Classics; Saturn Films
- Distributed by: Image Entertainment
- Release date: May 9, 2014
- Running time: 94 minutes
- Countries: United States; France
- Language: English
- Budget: $25 million

Rage, titled Tokarev in most of Europe and Australia, is a 2014 American action crime thriller film directed by Paco Cabezas and written by Jim Agnew and Sean Keller. The film stars Nicolas Cage, Rachel Nichols, Peter Stormare, Danny Glover, Max Ryan, Judd Lormand and Pasha D. Lychnikoff.

== Plot ==
Paul Maguire and his buddies Kane and Danny live a life of crime as members of a branch of the Irish mob. One night, they ambush a Russian mobster, intercepting him when he's on his way to drop off money to his boss. The cash is enough for Paul to leave the life of crime and go legit, but their crime sets off a bloody protracted war between their Irish crime family and the Russian mob. Paul instructs his friends to hide the money until things calm down between their outfit and the Russians. In spite of several casualties on both sides, their plan works well; five years after stealing the money, Paul, Kane and Danny meet to split up their earnings.

Over the next twenty years, Paul uses his share to slowly build a legitimate construction empire in Mobile, Alabama. He marries a beautiful, ambitious young woman named Vanessa and is a doting father to his teenage daughter Caitlin. His former mob boss, O’Connell, has allowed him to go legit and stays on speaking terms, but he remains friends with his buddies Kane and Danny, who haven't had his luck when it comes to reforming. One night Paul and Vanessa are heading to a charity dinner, leaving Caitlin at home to hang out with her friends Evan and Mike. At the dinner, Mobile P.D. Detective St. John approaches Paul, who told him that Caitlin is missing.

Evan and Mike tell the police and Paul that they were watching TV with Caitlin, when several masked men barged in and took her. They fought – but the men overtook Mike and Evan. Convinced the kidnapping is long-overdue retaliation for the crimes of his youth, Paul ignores the police and enlists Kane and Danny to help his own investigation.

Paul's patience with the police ends completely when Caitlin's body is found in a storm drain. After her funeral, O'Connell strongly suggests that Paul allow the police to handle the investigation, saying that Paul was allowed to walk out of the mob, and therefore he should stay away from mob methods. Paul and his buddies shake down and rough up anyone they can find who might be connected to Chernov, the legendary mob boss whose money they stole seventeen years earlier, believing that they're involved in Caitlin's murder. O'Connell pleads with Paul to stop his rampage, but he refuses. Vanessa, who initially backed her husband's search, now fears he's becoming the killer he once was.

After executing some of Chernov's men and wrecking their businesses, Paul and his buddies are targeted by Chernov. When Kane is captured and tortured, he tries to get Chernov to admit to killing Caitlin as revenge for the heist decades ago. Chernov is perplexed, but also angry that Paul did the crime, as the Russian mobster they killed turns out to be Chernov's brother. Meanwhile, Paul thinks Danny ratted them out because he is directly working for O'Connell, and his use of drugs and parties. The two fight, resulting in Paul accidentally killing Danny with a knife in a moment of wrath.

Chernov arranges a meet with O'Connell, explains Paul's part in starting the long-ago gang war, and demands O'Connell exact discipline. O'Connell refuses to listen to Chernov on general principles, and engages in a shootout, leaving Chernov as the only survivor.

Paul finds a Tokarev pistol in his closet, a relic from the robbery that started the war years ago. He finally gets the real story from Mike; while drinking and horsing around with his guns that night, Mike accidentally shot his daughter, then created the kidnapping story in a panic. After an inner struggle, Paul allows Mike to live and walks away. Returning home, Paul phones his wife, apologizing and saying things will be over soon, as Chernov and some of his surviving men enter his house. He then tells her the story about the first time he killed, when someone gave him a knife in a barfight. He stabs himself as he watches men entering the room with guns pointed at him. Paul is shot and killed. Vanessa reaches home only to witness policemen taking out Paul's body with teary eyes.

== Cast ==
- Nicolas Cage as Paul Maguire
  - Weston Cage as Young Paul Maguire
- Rachel Nichols as Vanessa
- Peter Stormare as Frances "Frank" O'Connell
- Danny Glover as Detective Peter St. John
- Max Ryan as Kane
  - Jon Dannelley as Young Kane
- Michael McGrady as Danny Doherty
- Judd Lormand as Mr. White
- Max Fowler as Mike
- Pasha D. Lychnikoff as Chernov
- Ron Goleman as Detective Hanson
- Aubrey Peeples as Caitlin Maguire
- Elena Sanchez as Lisa
- Garrison Tyler as Ivan
- Dawn Hamil as Amber
- Jack Falahee as Evan
- Kelly Tippens as Eleanor
- Kevin Lavell Young as Oliver
- Patrice Cols as Anton
- Steven Vickers Jr. as Jack
- Sarah Ann Schultz as Miss Russell
- Paul Sampson as Sasha Barad
- Sam Velasquez as Tony Blanco
- Elisa García as Águeda Blanco

== Production ==
In February 2013, it was announced that Nicolas Cage had agreed to star in Tokarev for Hannibal Classics from a script by Jim Agnew and Sean Keller with Paco Cabezas set to direct.

Filming was initially schedule to take place in Spokane, Washington in May 2013, but instead began in June 2013 in Mobile, Alabama.

== Reception ==
Rage received negative reviews from critics. On Rotten Tomatoes, the film holds a rating of 13%, based on 40 reviews, with an average rating of 3/10. The site's consensus reads, "Depressingly dull and all-around poorly made, Rage is the rare Nicolas Cage action thriller lacking enough energy to reach 'so bad it's good' territory." On Metacritic, the film has a score of 28 out of 100, based on 17 critics, indicating "generally unfavorable reviews".
