= Neon Flesh =

- Theatrical release poster
- Spanish: Carne de neón
- Directed by: Paco Cabezas
- Screenplay by: Paco Cabezas
- Based on: Carne de neón (short film) by Paco Cabezas
- Produced by: Juan Gordon
- Starring: Mario Casas; Vicente Romero; Luciano Cáceres; Macarena Gómez; Dámaso Conde; Vanessa Oliveira; Darío Grandinetti; Blanca Suárez; Antonio de la Torre; Ángela Molina
- Cinematography: Daniel Aranyó
- Edited by: Antonio Frutos
- Music by: Julio de la Rosa; Óscar Araujo
- Production companies: Morena Films; Jaleo Films; Oberon Cinematográfica; Mandarin Films; Hepp Films; Pensa&Rocca
- Distributed by: Vértice Cine (es)
- Release dates: 9 October 2010 (Sitges); 21 January 2011 (Spain); 21 February 2013 (Argentina)
- Countries: Spain; Argentina; Sweden; France
- Language: Spanish

Neon Flesh (Spanish: Carne de neón) is a 2010 neo-noir thriller with comedy elements film directed by Paco Cabezas which stars Mario Casas alongside Vicente Romero, Macarena Gómez, Blanca Suárez, and Ángela Molina. It is a Spanish-Argentine-Swedish-French co-production.

== Plot ==
Upon his release, Ricky reunites with his mother, Pura, who has been working as a prostitute to make ends meet. Pura has been saving up money to fulfill Ricky's dream of opening a brothel, but when she is killed in a car accident, Ricky decides to honor her memory by fulfilling his own dream and opening a high-end brothel.

Ricky enlists the help of his former cellmate, Angelito, and his friend, Carlos, to make his dream a reality. Together, they set out to acquire the necessary funds and equipment to open the brothel, but soon find themselves in over their heads when they become the targets of a powerful and violent criminal gang led by the ruthless El Chino.

As they struggle to keep their business afloat and stay alive in the face of danger, Ricky and his friends must confront their own past mistakes and personal demons. In the end, they must make difficult choices and take drastic action to protect themselves and the ones they love.

Overall, Neon Flesh is a gritty and suspenseful film that explores themes of family, loyalty, and the consequences of our actions.

== Cast ==
- Mario Casas as Ricky
- Vicente Romero as Angelito
- Macarena Gómez as La Canija
- Ángela Molina as Pura
- Blanca Suárez as Verónica
- Darío Grandinetti as El Chino
- Dámaso Conde
- Luciano Cáceres as El Niño
- Antonio de la Torre as Santos
- Vanessa Oliveira
- Juan Carlos Vellido
- Andrea Carballo
- María Zamarbide
- Ágatha Fresco

== Production ==
The film is based on a short film of the same name directed by Paco Cabezas. Some cast members from the short film reprised their roles in the full-length film (notable exceptions were Óscar Jaenada and Victoria Abril, respectively replaced by Mario Casas and Ángela Molina).

A co-production among companies from Spain, Argentina, Sweden and France, the film was produced by Juan Gordon's Morena Films alongside Jaleo Films, Oberon Cinematográfica, Mandarin Films, Hepp Films and Pensa&Rocca, with the participation of Canal Sur, TVC, TVV, TVG, and ETB. Shooting locations in Spain included Seville whereas shooting locations in Argentina included Belgrano (Buenos Aires). Crew during the Argentine part of the filming used masks due to the 2009 swine flu pandemic alert.

== Release ==
The film was presented at the Sitges Film Festival on 9 October 2010.

Distributed by Vértice Cine, it was theatrically released in Spain on 21 January 2011. It opened in Argentine theatres on 21 February 2013.

== Reception ==
Jonathan Holland of Variety assessed that the "hugely entertaining" film "reps crude, violent, flashy and sentimental fare, but with a sharp, intelligent edge that gets it out of jail".

Jesús Palacios of Fotogramas rated the film 3 out of 5 stars highlighting the honesty of the proposal whilst pointing out its "cinephagic naivety", assessing that "however irregular it sometimes appears, [it is] one of the most refreshing Spanish films of the year".

== See also ==
- List of Spanish films of 2011
- List of Argentine films of 2013
