= Seth Wulsin =

American sculptor

Seth Wulsin (born April 15, 1981, in Spring Valley, NY) is an independent journalist and contemporary artist working primarily with space, time and light through large-scale, site-specific, ephemeral sculpture, drawing and architectural performance.

Wulsin is best known for his work, 16 Tons, Prison Demolition, a massive public piece in Buenos Aires, Argentina, that worked with the demolition of the infamous Caseros Prison between 2005 and 2009.

In 2010, Wulsin's work was thrown into the spotlight when a sculpture from his counter-surveillance oriented Time Drops in Decay series, consisting of higher-dimensional internally reflecting mirror objects, was broken by then-Mayor of Buenos Aires Mauricio Macri (who later became president of Argentina) on a televised tour of the art fair ArteBA. Artist and filmmaker, Joshua Sandler, used the ensuing scandal as raw material for a documentary film called Who gives A Shit About Art? critiquing the intersection of art, politics and capital. Wulsin's work Wishing Well, an expansion on the Time Drops series, was exhibited at Boulder Museum of Contemporary Art in 2011.
