= Palmero =

Palmero may refer to:

- Palmero (surname), surname
- Palmero cheese, Spanish plain or lightly smoked cheese
- Palmero Conspiracy, failed plot to overthrow the Spanish colonial government in the Philippines

== See also ==
- Palmera (disambiguation)
