= Juana Viale =

Argentine actress and television host

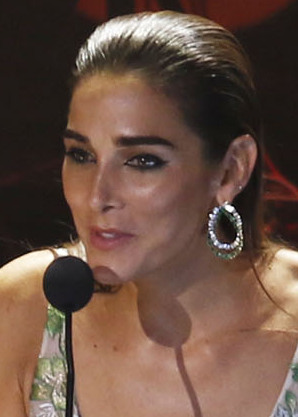
- At the 2017 Fénix Awards
- Born: Juana Viale del Carril Tinayre; 15 April 1982 (age 44); Buenos Aires, Argentina
- Occupations: Actress, presenter
- Partner: Gonzalo Valenzuela (2005–2014)
- Children: 3
- Parents: Ignacio Viale del Carril (father); Marcela Tinayre (mother)
- Relatives: Ignacio 'Nacho' Viale del Carril Tinayre (brother); Manuela Viale (paternal half-sister); Rocco Gastaldi Tinayre (maternal half-brother); Mirtha Legrand (maternal grandmother); Daniel Tinayre (maternal grandfather); Marcos Gastaldi (former stepfather); Silvia Legrand (great-aunt); José A. Martínez Suárez (great-uncle)

Juana Viale del Carril (born 15 April 1982) is an Argentine actress and television host. She is the granddaughter of Mirtha Legrand and Daniel Tinayre, the great-niece of Silvia Legrand and José A. Martínez Suárez, and the daughter of Marcela Tinayre.

== Biography ==
Juana Viale was born in Buenos Aires on 15 April 1982, the daughter of businesswoman and presenter Marcela Tinayre and Ignacio Viale Del Carril. (Note: Some sources give her birthdate as 8 April.) She is the granddaughter of Mirtha Legrand and Daniel Tinayre, and the great-niece of Silvia Legrand and José A. Martínez Suárez. She has four siblings, including actress Manuela Viale.

She began her acting career in 2003, when telenovela producer Marcelo Tinelli convinced her to play a villain in the second phase of Costumbres argentinas.

In 2004, Viale acted in the Telefe series Sangre fría, starring Mariano Martínez and Dolores Fonzi. In 2005, she appeared in the telenovela Doble vida, broadcast by the Argentine channel América. She starred in two chapters of Mujeres asesinas in 2005 and 2008. In cinema, she made her film debut in the film Radio Corazón together with the leading Chilean actress, Claudia di Girolamo. She next acted in El cine de Maite, and was one of the protagonists of The Widows of Thursdays in 2009.

In 2010, she obtained her first leading role, Renata Medina, in Malparida, one of the first Argentine telenovelas in which a protagonist is a villain and murderer.

In 2011, she made her theater debut in the play La celebración, and in cinema she starred in the film La patria equivocada. The following year she appeared in two episodes of La dueña, starring her grandmother, Mirtha Legrand.

In 2013, Viale made a special appearance as a villain in the El Trece sitcom Solamente vos, together with Adrián Suar and Natalia Oreiro. The following year she returned as a guest villain in Mis amigos de siempre. In cinema, she costarred with Florencia Raggi in the movie Mala.

In 2014, she replaced her grandmother on a broadcast of the interview show Almorzando con Mirtha Legrand, making her debut as a host. She also appeared in the Chilean series Sudamerican Rockers, and in Argentina, Las 13 esposas de Wilson Fernández.

In 2015, she acted in the film Tuya, and in the miniseries Malicia, together with Gabriel Goity, Ana Celentano, and Mario Alarcón.

Viale competed in the dance reality show Bailando por un sueño, where she took fourteenth place after five months of competition. On Netflix, she starred in the series Estocolmo.

In 2018, she starred in Edha, a Netflix series with Andrés Velencoso and Antonio Birabent, among others.

In Chile, she starred in the play La sangre de los árboles, together with the Uruguayan actress Victoria Césperes.

In 2020, her grandmother Mirtha Legrand had to stop working on her programs Almorzando con Mirtha Legrand and La noche de Mirtha because she was a person at risk during the COVID-19 pandemic. Juana Viale replaced her at the helm of both programs that year and the following.

In December 2021, the actress premiered a new series on Amazon Prime Video, titled Causalidad.

== Personal life ==
In 2002, a year before entering show business, Viale dated musician Juan de Benedictis, son of the Argentine singer Piero. Their daughter, Ámbar de Benedictis, was born on 2003. In 2005, she started a dating relationship with Doble vida co-star, Chilean actor Gonzalo Valenzuela, they became a steady cohabiting couple, that went on to have two sons, Silvestre, born in January 2008, and Alí, born in March 2012. Their son, Ringo, was born a stillborn in May 2011. Viale and Valenzuela separated in 2014. From 2019 to 2022, Viale was in a relationship with architect Agustín Goldenhorn. In 2024, Viale confirmed her relationship with sailor Yago Lange. Viale and Lange amicably separated in June 2026. She briefly dated his father, Santiago Lange.

== Filmography ==
=== Films ===
Year	Title	Role	Director
2007	Radio Corazón	Manuela Fernández	Roberto Artiagoitia
2008	El cine de Maite	Juana	Federico Palazzo
2009	The Widows of Thursdays	Carla	Marcelo Piñeyro
2010	La patria equivocada	Niña Clarita	Carlos Galettini
2013	Mala	Angélica	Adrián Caetano
2013	No somos animales	Conchita	Alejandro Agresti
2015	Tuya	Charo	Edgardo González Amer
2015	Baires	Andrea "Andy"	Marcelo Páez Cubells
2016	Beyond Brotherhood	Mrs. Bedi	Arianne Benedetti
2016	Resentimental	Sofía	Leonardo Damario
2017	Mariel espera	Mariel	Maximiliano Pelosi
2017	Los perros	Antonia	Marcela Said
2018	Camino sinuoso	Mía Siero	Juan Pablo Kolodziej
2020	Trópico	Lena	Sabrina Farji
2021	Lo inevitable		Fercks Castellani
2021	Causalidad	Claudia Mariño	Ignacio Luppi
2022	El paraíso	Madame Safó	Fernando Sirianni, Federico Breser
2023	Recursos humanos	Verónica	Jesús Magaña Vázquez
2023	Virgen rosa		Dennis Smith

=== TV series ===
Year	Title	Role	Channel
2003–2004	Costumbres argentinas	Carolina Martínez	Telefe
2004	Sangre fría	Irina Bustamante	Telefe
2005	Doble vida	Paula Olmos	América TV
2005	Mujeres asesinas 1	Ana Drollfi, "Ep2: Ana D., mujer corrosiva"	El Trece
2006	Se dice amor	Dolores Ocampo	Telefe
2008	Mujeres asesinas 4	Marta, "Ep3: Marta, manipuladora"	El Trece
2008–2009	Por amor a vos	Bárbara Cortés	El Trece
2010–2011	Malparida	Renata Medina	El Trece
2011	Los únicos	Herself (cameo)	El Trece
2012	La dueña	Cecilia Peralta Ramos	Telefe
2013	Solamente vos	Victoria O'Connor	El Trece
2013–2014	Mis amigos de siempre	Delfina Correa	El Trece
2014	Sudamerican Rockers	Celeste	Chilevisión
2014	Las 13 esposas de Wilson Fernández	Mónica	Televisión Pública
2015	Malicia	Malena Sanz	Televisión Pública
2016	Los ricos no piden permiso	Luciana Acevedo Márquez	El Trece
2016	Estocolmo	Rosario Santa Cruz	Netflix
2018	Edha	Edha Abadi	Netflix
2022	Último primer día	Zoe Wagner	Flow

=== TV programs ===
Year	Title	Role	Channel
2014, 2020–2021	Almorzando con Mirtha Legrand	Replacement host	El Trece
2015	Showmatch	Competitor, 11th eliminated	El Trece
2018	Me gusta tu canción	Host	El Trece
2019	Por el mundo	Guest host	Telefe
2020	Estelita en casa	Guest	América TV
2020	Historias de cuarentena	Host	IGTV
2020–2021	La noche de Mirtha	Replacement host	El Trece
2022–present	Almorzando con Juana	Host	El Trece

=== Music videos ===
Year	Title	Artist
2003	"Sin tu amor"	Sandra Mihanovich
2013	"El jardín"	Silvestre feat. Javiera Parra

== Theater ==
- 2011 – La celebración
- 2015–2018 – La sangre de los árboles
- 2016–2017 – Noche corta
- 2019 – El ardor
- 2019 – Cuarenta días, cuarenta noches
- 2023 – Trafico (Madrid)

== Awards and nominations ==
Year	Award	Category	Work	Result	Ref.
2003	Martín Fierro Awards	Artistic Revelation	Costumbres argentinas	Nominee	
2009	Argentine Academy of Cinematography Arts and Sciences Awards	Best Actress Revelation	The Widows of Thursdays	Nominee	
2009	Clarín Awards	Women's Revelation in Film	The Widows of Thursdays	Nominee	
2011	Martín Fierro Awards	Best Telenovela Actress	Malparida	Nominee	
2019	Sea Star Awards	Revelation	Cuarenta días, cuarenta noches / El ardor	Nominee	
2020	Most Clicked Awards	Celebrity with Best Internet Rating	Herself	Winner	
2020	Montreal World Film Festival	Best Actress	Trópico	Winner	
2021	Produ Awards	Best Woman TV Presenter	La noche de Mirtha / Almorzando con Mirtha Legrand	Nominee	
2022	Martín Fierro Awards	Best Woman Host	La noche de Mirtha / Almorzando con Mirtha Legrand	Winner	
