= Caseros Prison Demolition Project – 16 Tons =

Work by artist Seth Wulsin

Coordinates: 34.6333°S 58.3949°W

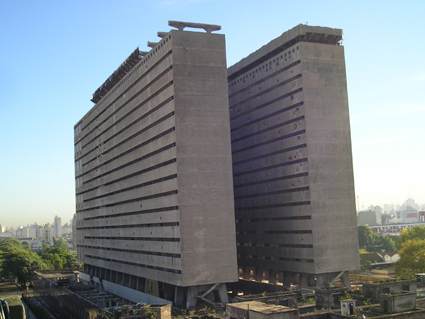
Southwestern view of Caseros prison, April 2006

The Caseros Prison Demolition Project — 80,000 Tons, which contains 16 Tons and Aparecidos, is the work of artist Seth Wulsin. It uses the defunct Caseros Prison of Buenos Aires, Argentina and its demolition as raw materials.

Aparecido is the past participle for the Spanish verb aparecer - to appear. Its second meaning is apparition or ghost. It may also refer in an oblique way to Argentina's Dirty War, in which an estimated 30,000 people, "Desaparecidos" disappeared between 1976 and 1981 by the military junta, many of them thrown from airplanes into the Rio Plate.

Sixteen Tons, the name of a popular song written in the late 1940s, referred to the amount of coal a miner was expected to load in a day, but in this context may refer to the amount of glass broken out through the installation, or de-installation, process.

80,000 tons is the approximate weight of the entire building, and the debris that the demolition produced.

== The demolition ==
On a basic level, the demolition of the prison, contracted out by the city government of Buenos Aires to the Argentine military, was the seed for the artwork. The building was slated for demolition in 2001, but the process was subject to various legal, environmental and bureaucratic roadblocks. The original plan was to implode the building in three steps. But the implosion was stopped at the last minute by a group of neighbors concerned about the possibility of damaging environmental effects, including asbestos poisoning and the possibility of driving millions of rats out of the tunnels underneath the prison. Caseros was demolished by mechanical means floor by floor from the top down between 2003 and 2008. The cost of demolishing the prison, and thus the budget for the artwork, was estimated at somewhere between one and three million dollars.

== The grids ==
The window grids on the north end of the former prison provided the locus and point of entry for the work. Each grid was approximately 17 feet (5.2 m) tall and 9 feet (2.7 m) wide. Breaking out certain windows, Wulsin created faces in each of the 48 outer grids on the building. Each grid consisted of 11 x 19 (209) circular semi-opaque windows, eight inches (200 mm) in diameter. The windows that remained reflected the light of the sky, the sun and the moon, producing images from certain angles that were completely a function of space and light—the dark interior space of the prison, and the light shining through the optically reflective space of the remaining windows.

The pictorial space of each image was directed at different points on the ground where the sun reflecting in the windows was visible. The viewing angles changed throughout the year as the sun's elevation in the sky changed.

In addition to the 48 outer window grids, there were also 48 grids facing inward, directly opposite the outer grids. They didn't reflect the light of the sun from any possible viewing angles on the street, but the artist worked with them as well, using Morse code to embed messages in the window grids.

The window grids were already in various stages of decomposition when Wulsin found the building, with almost a third of the total number of windows already broken out by inmates during various prison riot when the jail was still in use.

The cycle of appearance and disappearance that took place according to the daily, monthly and yearly lunar and solar cycles, and the position of the potential viewer was underscored at a larger magnitude by the demolition process, which consisted in the removal of the building from the top down, floor by floor. The demolition lasted until March 2008, with the majority of the rubble taken to a fill in the River Plate at Costanera Norte near Jorge Newbury Airport.

After discovering the prison in January 2006, while exploring the neighborhood of Parque Patricios, where he'd recently moved from New York City, Wulsin spent four months navigating the bureaucracies of the national and city governments of Argentina and Buenos Aires, respectively, to gain authorization to enter the building and carry out the onsite work. The resolution authorizing the project was finally signed on Friday, June 16 (Bloomsday), 2006 by Minister of Public Works of the city of Buenos Aires, Juan Schiavi. The security tarp made by Wulsin to direct broken glass back inside the building was blue and white, and painted with the hot air balloon logo of the local Parque Patricios soccer team Huracan. The five weeks of onsite work were completed on Marcel Duchamp's birthday, July 28. But the project itself was ongoing through the entire demolition process of the building.

== Gallery ==
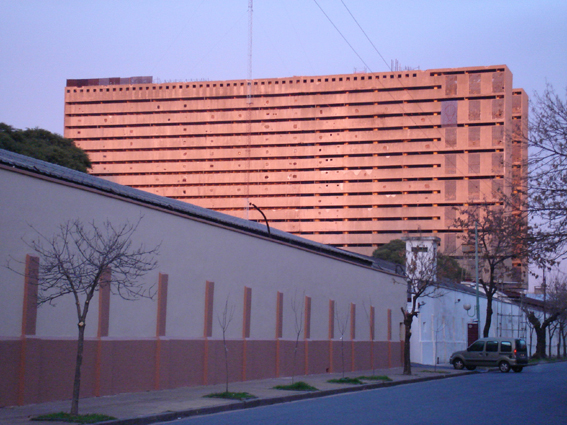
Caseros at sunrise. June 2006

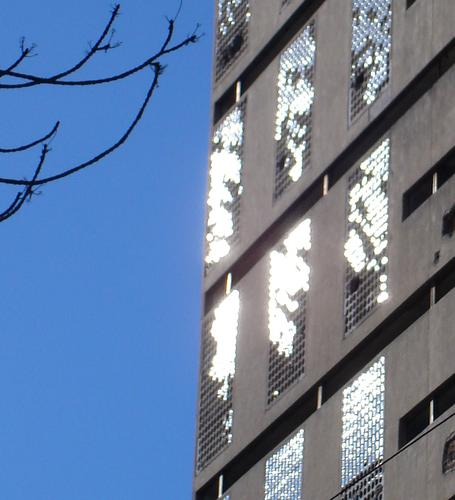
West wall faces of Caseros prison. July 2006

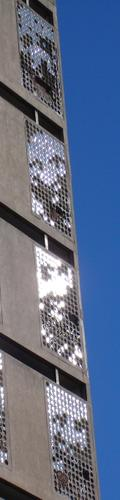
Some east wall faces of Caseros prison, lit by the sun. July 2006

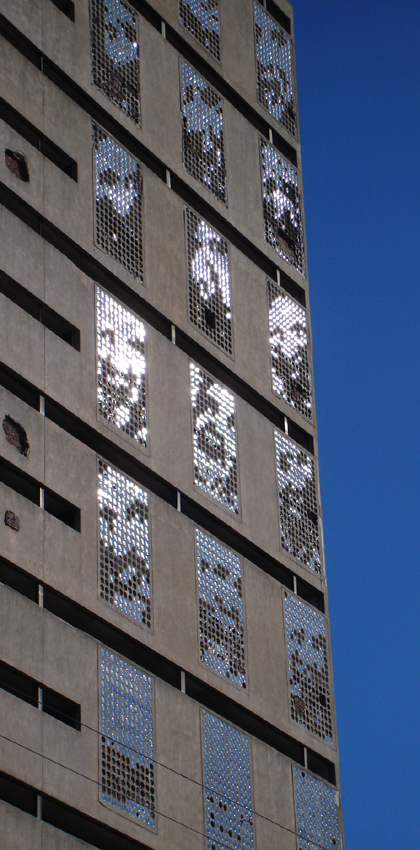
More east wall faces of Caseros prison. July 2006

== See also ==
- Caseros Prison
