= The Past (2007 film) =

2010 Argentine drama film

- Spanish: El pasado
- Directed by: Héctor Babenco
- Starring: Gael García Bernal; Analía Couceyro
- Distributed by: 20th Century Fox (Argentina); Warner Bros. Pictures (Brazil)
- Release date: 10 September 2007 (TIFF)
- Running time: 114 minutes
- Countries: Argentina; Brazil
- Language: Spanish

The Past (Spanish: El pasado) is a 2007 Argentine drama film directed by Héctor Babenco based on the homonymous novel by Alan Pauls.

== Synopsis ==
After 12 years, Sofia and Rimini decide to separate. While Rimini tries to distance himself from her and start a new life, Sofia clings to the past and constantly harasses him. She reappears time and time again on Rimini's horizon to either win him back, torture him, or redeem him.

== Cast ==
- Gael García Bernal as Rímini
- Analía Couceyro as Sofía
- Ana Celentano as Carmen
- Moro Anghileri as Vera
- Paulo Autran as Poussiere
- Marta Lubos as Frida
