= Mala (2013 film) =

- Directed by: Adrián Caetano
- Written by: Adrián Caetano; Bruno Hernández; Luciana Piantanida
- Produced by: Juan Pablo Gugliotta; Natalia Videla Peña; Gustavo Funes; Silvia Lamas
- Starring: Florencia Raggi; Juana Viale
- Cinematography: Diego Poleri
- Edited by: Mario Sandoval
- Music by: Sebastián Escofet
- Distributed by: Buena Vista International
- Release date: 14 February 2013
- Running time: 93 minutes
- Country: Argentina
- Language: Spanish

Mala (Bad or Evil) is a 2013 Argentine crime film directed by Adrián Caetano and starring Ana Celentano, Brenda Gandini, Florencia Raggi, Juana Viale, Julián Krakov, Liz Solari, María Duplaá and Rafael Ferro. The plot revolves around Rosario, an assassin who only kills men who mistreat or abuse women.

== Cast ==
- Florencia Raggi as Rosario (II)
- Juana Viale as Angélica
- Liz Solari as Rosario (I)
- María Duplaa as Rosario (III)
- Brenda Gandini as Rosario (IV)
- Rafael Ferro as Rodrigo
- Ana Celentano as María
- Julián Krakov as Carlos Javier
- Arturo Goetz
- Daniel Valenzuela
- Susana Pampín
- Laura Espínola
- Rubén Noceda
- Rogelio Gracia
- Erasmo Olivera
- Alejandro Ciancio
