= Caseros Prison =

Building in Buenos Aires, Argentina

Coordinates: 34.6333°S 58.3949°W

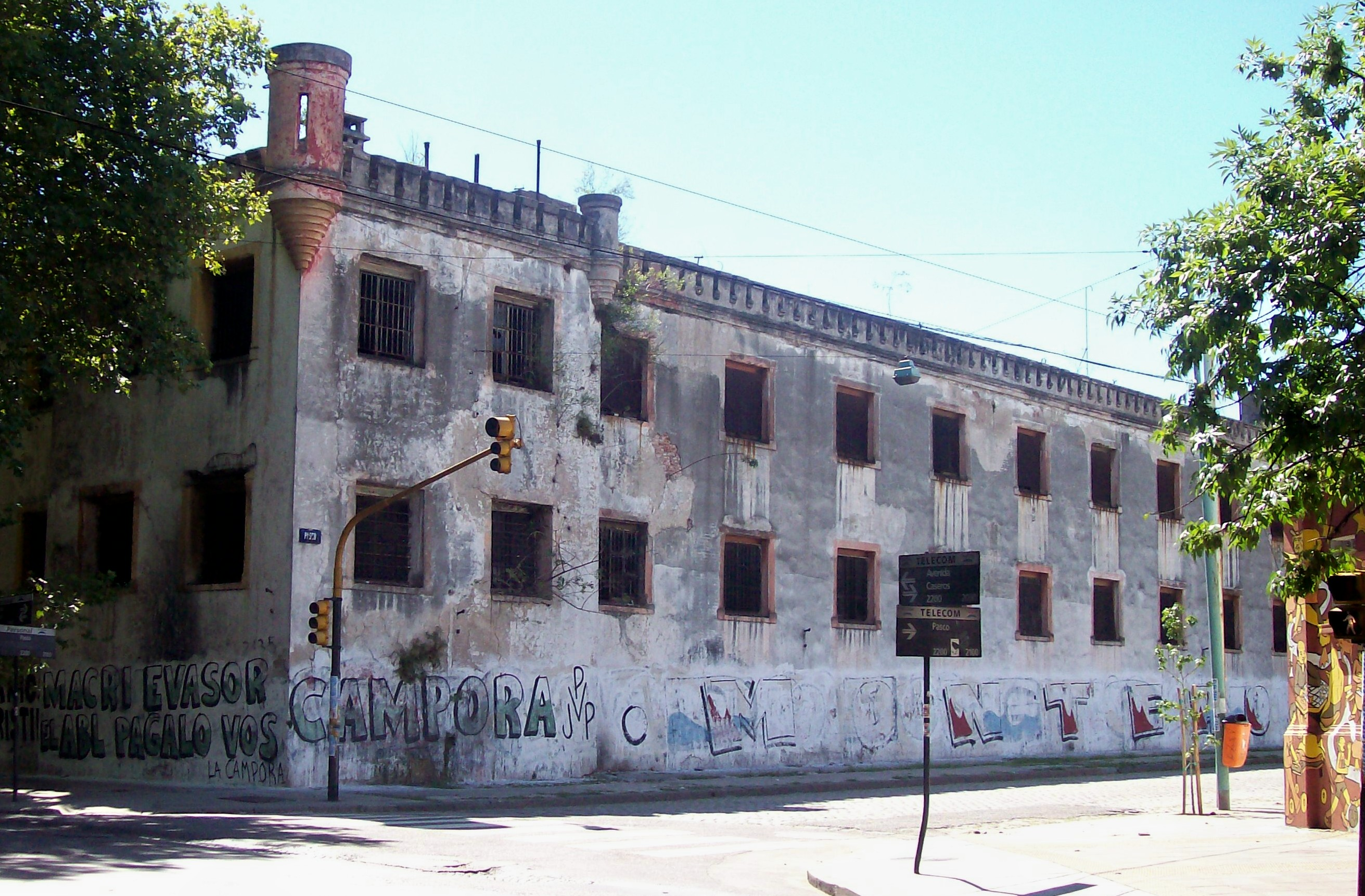
Old Caseros prison wall, 2008

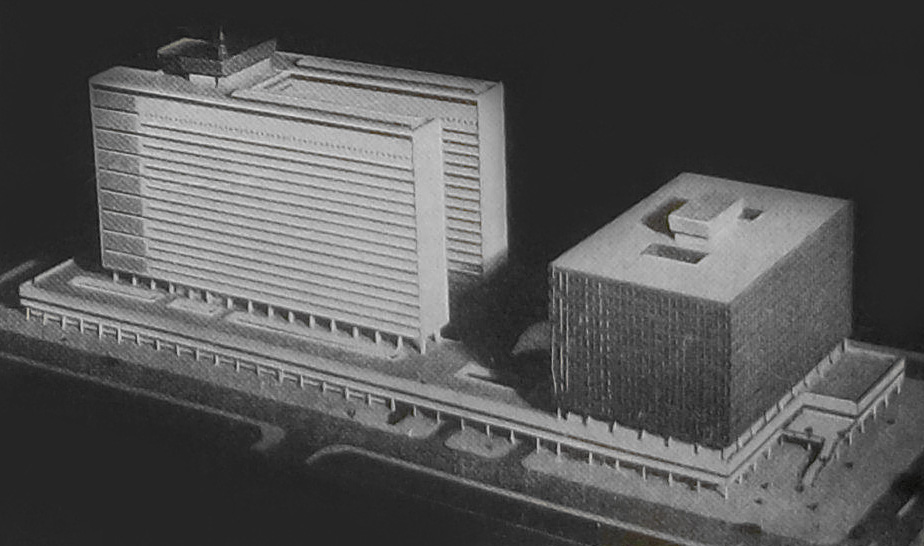
Scale model of the planned judicial complex; the courthouse (right) was never built.

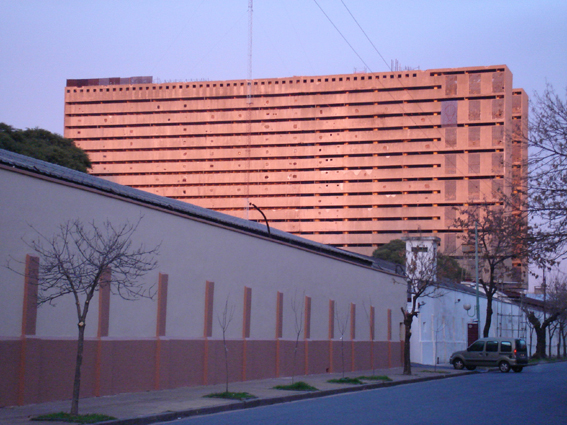
View of the old prison and the 1970s addition, June 2006

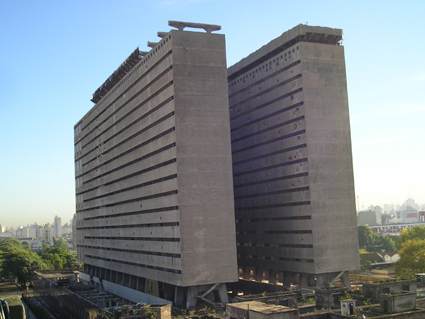
Southwestern view, April 2006

The Caseros Prison (Spanish: Cárcel de Caseros) was a panopticon prison in Parque Patricios, a neighborhood in the southern part of Buenos Aires, Argentina.

Caseros Prison was conceived by the military dictatorships of the 1960s, originally intended as a short term holding station for prisoners awaiting trial. It was built over the course of almost twenty years, from 1960 until 1979. Finished under the administration of the military junta presided over by dictator Jorge Rafael Videla, Caseros was opened in 1979 to house political prisoners. It was built next to an old prison of the same name, which was originally constructed as an orphanage in the 1880s. In the early 1950s, Juan Perón, cracking down on communists, used the old part to house political prisoners. The prison was closed down in 2001.

== Basic layout ==
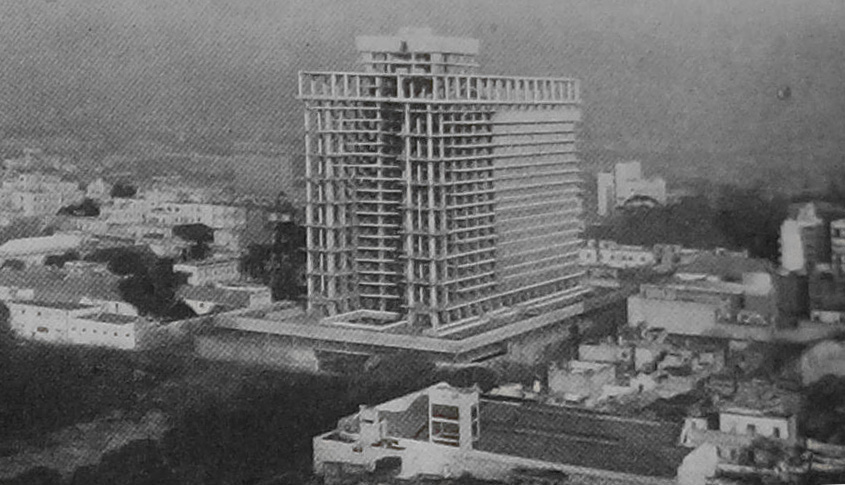
New prison building under construction, 1969

Standing 22 stories high, with a footprint shaped like the letter H, new Caseros had over 1,500 cells, and was designed to hold approximately 2,000 prisoners. Cells measured 1.2m × 2.3 m, and each had a bed, a toilet, and a small table and chair, attached to the floor. The building was designed so that no direct sunlight could ever reach the prisoners. The design of the place was criticized by human rights groups before the prison was ever opened for not meeting basic standards of humane treatment.

== Political prisoners ==
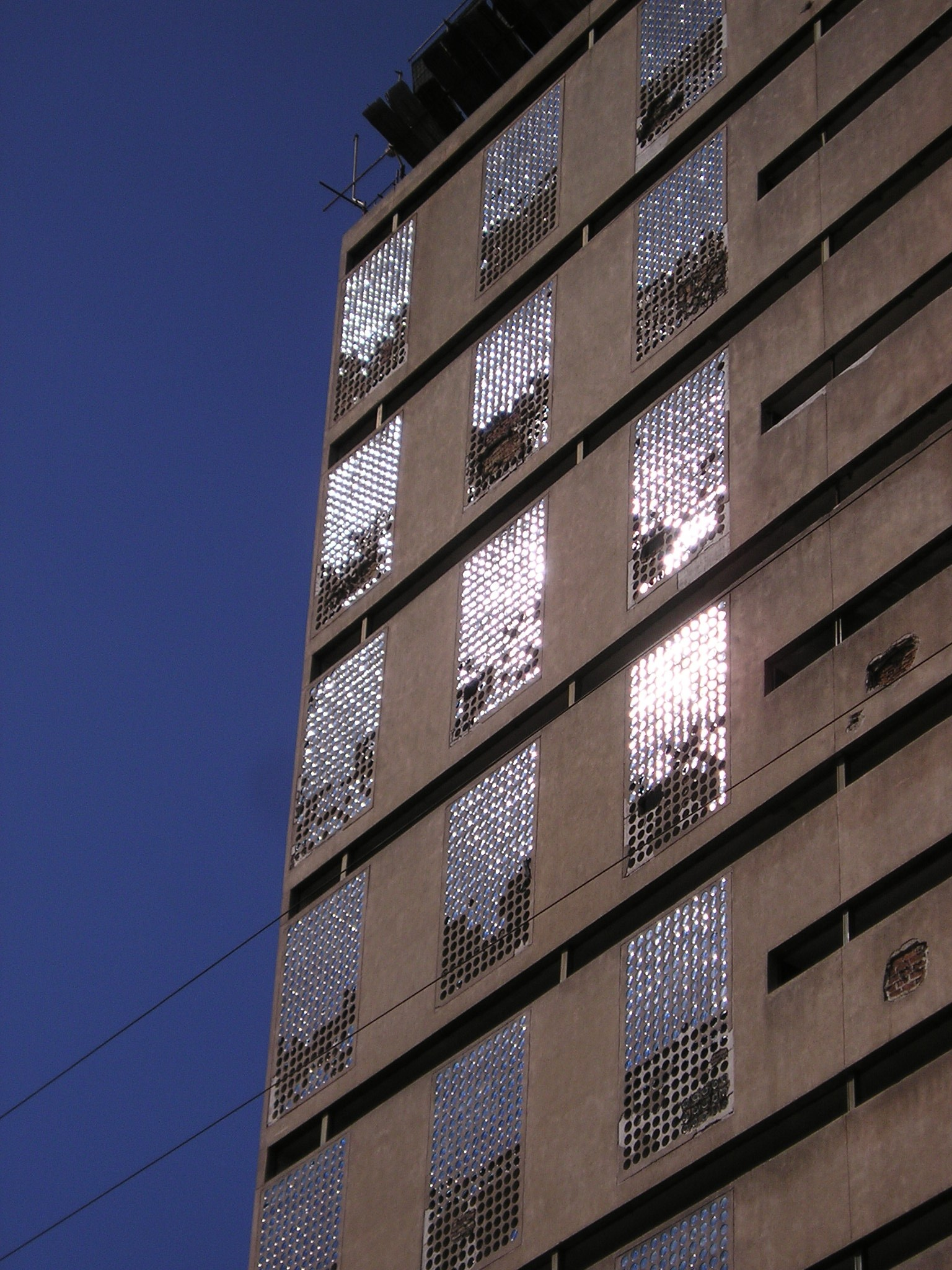
Western semi-opaque window grids of Caseros, reflecting the sun, March 2006

Approximately 1,500 political prisoners were held at some point in Caseros, most of them left-wing militants (from groups such as the Peronist Montoneros, or the Marxist PRT and ERP), or student organization leaders, who were arrested by the governments of Juan Perón in 1974 and his wife Isabel Perón in 1975. Thus, they were already "on the books" when Jorge Rafael Videla came into power in 1976 (incidentally, Videla was held for 38 days in the old prison during one of his brief incarcerations after the fall of the dictatorship). Because the political prisoners were registered with international human rights groups, it was more difficult to simply kill them or "disappear" them, as the military regime was doing with thousands of other people outside the prison (see Dirty War).

The political prisoners were kept in various jails around the country. When an international human rights commission came to Argentina in 1979 to assess the conditions of the prisoners, the Videla regime decided to move a group of high-profile prisoners to Caseros, inaugurating the new cárcel de Caseros with great pomp, as a way of showing the international community the respect and care they were giving to their political prisoners.

On April 23, 1979, Alberto Rodríguez Varela, then Minister of Justice, gave a speech at the inauguration ceremony in which he compared the prison to a five-star hotel, and lauded the features of its design as embodying the latest scientific evidence for how to best provide a context for the rehabilitation of delinquents and subversives, with the greatest respect for human dignity given to each individual who passed through the prison's doors.

== After the dictatorship ==
After the political prisoners were released, following the fall of the dictatorship in 1983, the prison was used to house common criminals. Its population commonly exceeded its intended capacity, sometimes with as many as five inmates living in one cell.

Again a human rights commission condemned the cramped conditions, so the government had the bars taken off the individual cells, and let the inmates move freely within each cell block. A prison riot in 1984 largely refigured the internal structure of the prison, and left the inmates with a greater measure of freedom to move around within the confines of the jail. The riot took place on the lower security lower floors; the maximum security cell blocks remained intact. The inmates ripped out the toilets in their cells to assure they would not be limited to individual cells again; they ripped out the glass in the visitors booths to assure direct contact with visitors. And they began knocking holes out of the outer walls to communicate between floors and gain access to sunlight. This also gave them a direct way of communicating with the outside world. According to neighbors who lived in apartments across the street from the prison during the 1980s and 1990s, girlfriends, mothers, brothers, friends, would fill the streets below the prison every day to chat with their loved ones living inside its walls.

Prisoners developed hand signals to communicate things they did not want the guards or other prisoners to hear. When a prisoner wanted to pass a note down to a girlfriend, he would attach a little bundle to the end of a long rope woven from mattress fibers and throw the bundle down into the street. The girlfriend down below would run to catch the bundle and take out the note. This would also give her an opportunity to stuff a note, cigarettes, drugs, a photograph of their child, a weapon, into the bundle, which the inmate could then hoist back up through the hole in the wall, before the guards came running to intercept the line. They called these rope and bundle setups palomas ("pigeons") and apparently, at any given time, seven or eight palomas could be flying down into the street, or back up to the prison, attached to their makeshift ropes.

=== The MTP ===
After the 1989 attack on La Tablada Regiment, sixteen members of the MTP (Movimiento Todos por la Patria) were sentenced to life in prison, and a few others were given shorter sentences, ranging from ten to twenty years in 1989. Many of them, including Antonio Puigjané, a Franciscan friar wrongfully accused of participating in the attacks, were placed in maximum security cells on the 18th floor of Caseros. Despite six years of effort on the part of Amnesty International, and other human rights groups, Puigjané was held for ten years in Caseros, before being put under house arrest when he turned seventy (an Argentine law allows for prisoners over the age of 70 to carry out the rest of their sentences under house arrest). In 2003, his sentence was finally commuted, after having served 14 years.

== The 1990s and afterwards ==
A complex social and political structure developed in the prison, amongst the inmates themselves, and between the inmates and the guards.

Caseros was used as a place to dismantle stolen cars during the 1990s. At the time there was also a mysterious episode in which two inmates were allowed out into the street for a night to go on a robbing spree. They shot and killed someone in the course of the night, and their faces were caught on camera. The next morning they were safely back in their cells, but the police identified them through the videotapes and began to investigate. Within the next three weeks, one of the inmates was found dead in his cell, apparently as a result of suicide. But his fellow inmates doubted the possibility of suicide, since he hadn't shown any signs of being suicidal. The guards who had let them out for a night in exchange for a cut of the booty were obvious suspects. Eventually all the guards were arrested as a part of the investigation, and held in custody for nearly a year. One guard was tried and found guilty of murder, receiving a sentence of twenty years in prison.

=== Closure and demolition ===
In 2001, Caseros Prison was officially shut down and slated for demolition. The 5-million peso no-bid contract was awarded to the military. The implosion of the building, originally planned for 2003, was delayed for years due to legal issues. The prison stood in the middle of a residential neighborhood, within blocks of two separate hospitals. The neighbors worried about the impact an implosion of such a building would have on the air. After a drawn out court battle, and environmental impact studies, it was agreed to demolish the prison by hand, floor by floor from the top down. As of 2008, the center buildings have been demolished. All that remains is the perimeter wall of the base, and the older original Caseros prison next door.

== Images ==
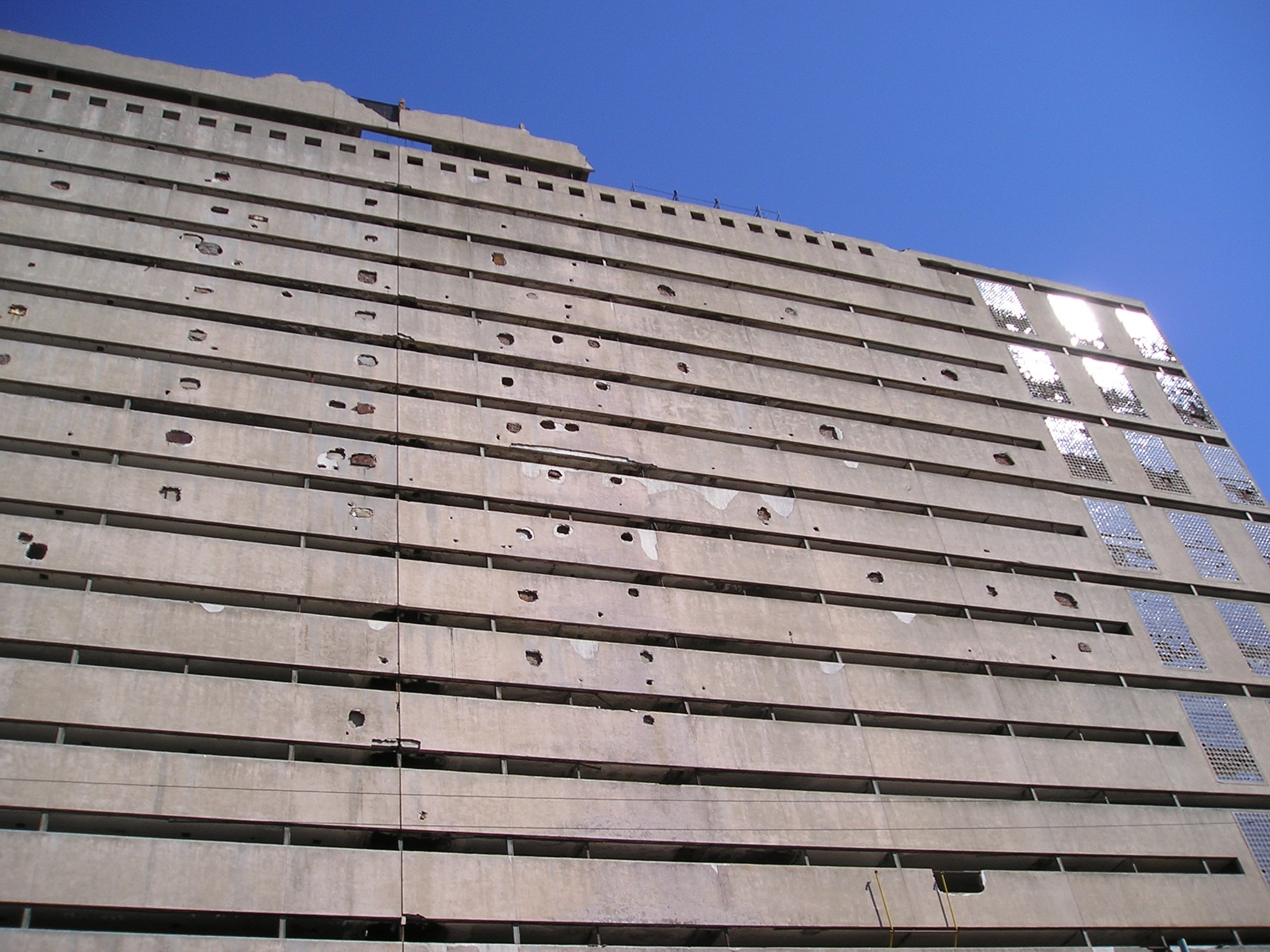
Eastern view of Caseros, April 2006

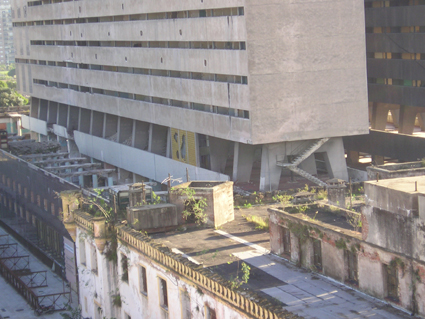
Structural foot of Caseros, west tower, April 2006

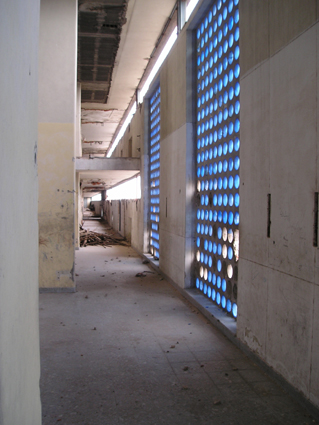
View into two levels of partially demolished cellblocks from the recreational hall, 3rd floor, April 2006

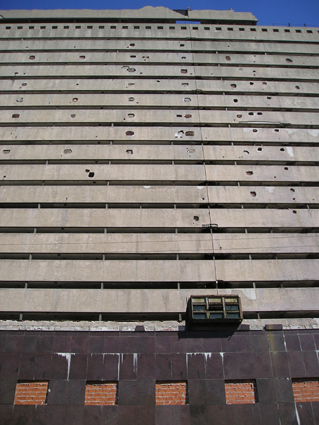
East wall of Caseros, with holes knocked out by prisoners during the 1984 riots. May 2006

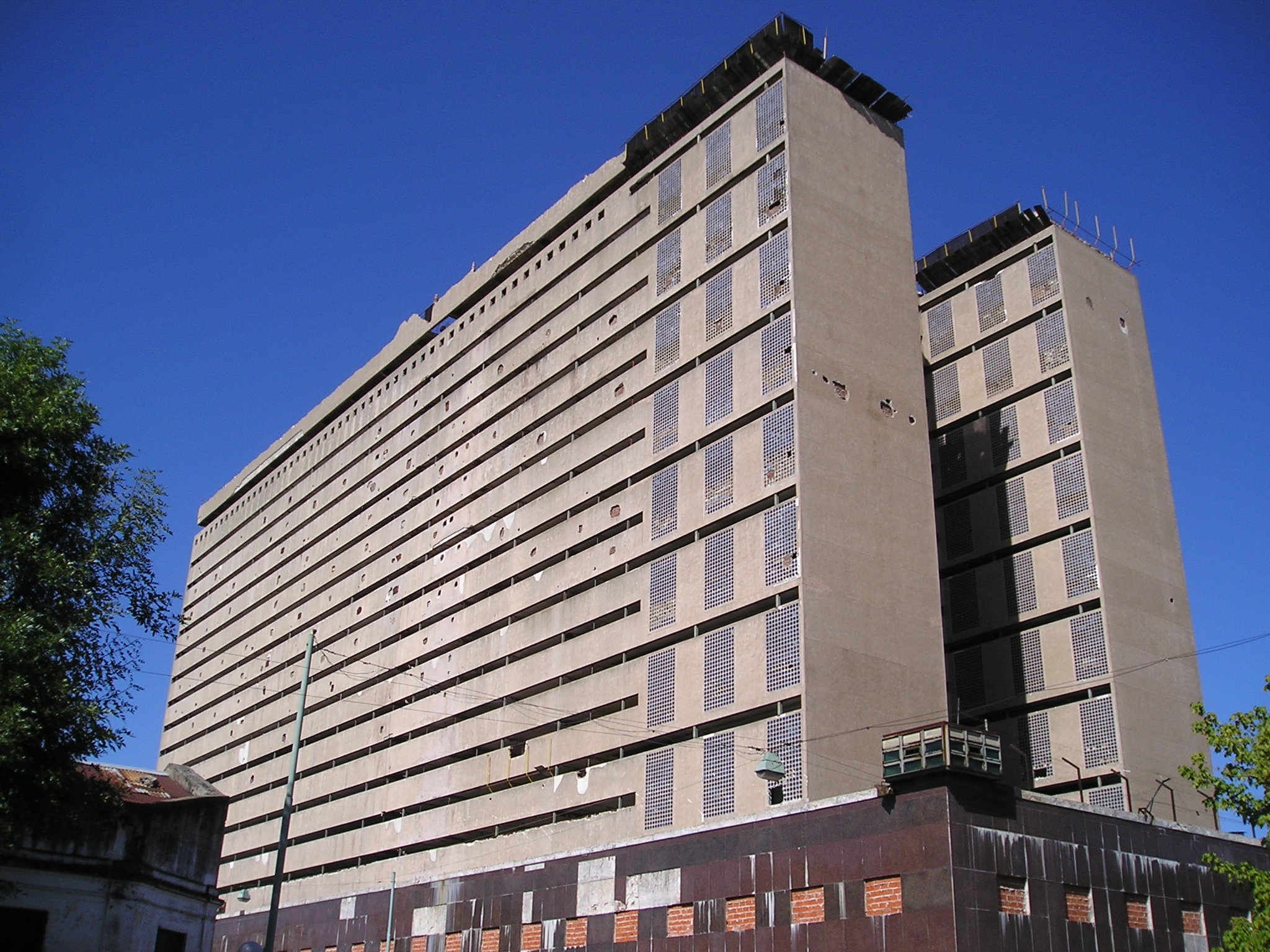
Northeastern view. March 2006

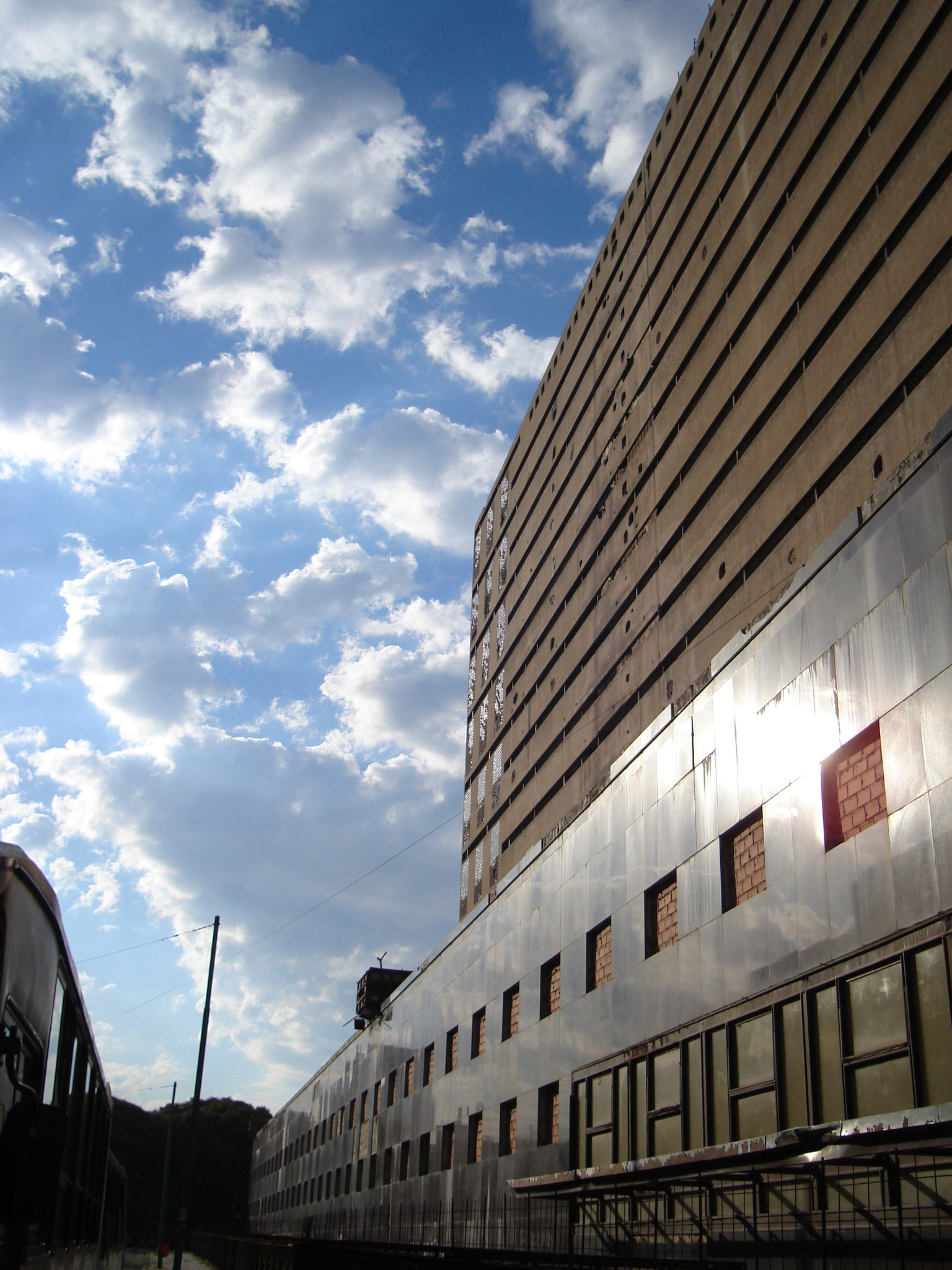
The marble of Caseros prison. July 2006
