= Ana Celentano =

Argentine actress (born 1969)

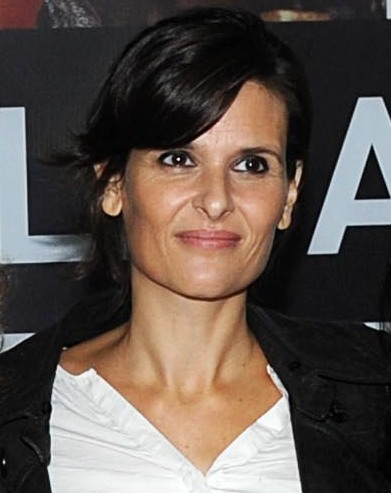
- Born: Ana Celentano; 1 August 1969 (age 57); La Plata, Argentina
- Occupation: Actress
- Years active: 1986–present
- Partner: Sergio Suárez
- Children: 1

Ana Celentano (born 1 August 1969) is an Argentine TV, theatre and film actress. She works mainly in the cinema of Argentina.

== Biography ==
Ana Celentano was born and raised in La Plata, Argentina.

== Partial filmography ==
- Night of the Pencils (1986) - Assembly delegate
- Un argentino en New York (1998) - Paola
- Okupas (2000 TV Miniseries) - Clara Alvarado
- The Escape (2001) - Wife of Opitti
- Resistiré (2003- Telenovela) - Mabel
- Whisky Romeo Zulu (2004) - Wife of Fiscal
- The Past (2007) - Carmen
- The Widows of Thursdays (2009) - Teresa
- Felicitas (2009) - Felisa Guerrero
- Lo que el tiempo nos dejó (2010- TV Miniseries) - Rosa
- Aliados (2013- Telenovela) - Elena García Iturbe
- La casa del mar (2015) - Clara Fonseca
- Mala (2013) - María
- The Lighthouse of the Orcas (2016) - Marcela
- Back to Buenos Aires (2026)
