= Return to Bolivia =

- Theatrical poster
- Directed by: Mariano Raffo
- Written by: Mariano Raffo
- Produced by: Marina Boolls; Felicitas Raffo
- Starring: Janeth Cuiza; Brian Quispe Cuiza; Camila Quispe Cuiza; Jhoselyn Quispe Cuiza; David Quispe
- Cinematography: Mariano Raffo
- Edited by: Marina Boolls
- Music by: Zelmar Garín
- Distributed by: Pelela cine-CEPA
- Release date: October 2008 (Tucumán Cine)
- Running time: 96 minutes
- Country: Argentina
- Languages: Spanish; Aymara

Return to Bolivia is a 2008 Argentine film directed by Mariano Raffo, who also wrote the script in collaboration with Marina Boolls.

The film was nominated for 22 awards and won four of them.

== Plot ==
Recounts the journey to their country of origin of a Bolivian family who lives in the neighborhood of Liniers, Buenos Aires, with a greengrocer. Related as a road-movie, the camera follows a pair of Bolivians with their three children, traveling to the edge of the boundary between Jujuy Province in Argentina and Tarija, Bolivia, and then go to a village in the highlands between Oruro and La Paz.

Return to Bolivia is an auteur documentary film that tells the story of a Bolivian family in Buenos Aires that decides to return to Bolivia. The documentary is filmed in a verite style and it gives a personal account of the subject of immigration, allowing the characters to lead the story. The narrative is based on universal values using a clear style that brings the story very close to fiction.

== Production ==
Shot with limited resources and a minimal film crew that included the director and the film's producer and soundman, Mariana Boolls. This production won several international awards, including the award for Best Foreign Film Festival Icaro XI of Guatemala and the Best Documentary Festival Gualeguaychú. It received positive reviews, like the Buenos Aires Herald's critic:

(...)the intelligent narrative and the skilful editing make Return to Bolivia a remarkable documentary, not just from a technical point of view. Indeed, Return to Bolivia, more than just a camera following the travails of a group of people, is about life and death, death and life, the exploration of which is never easy.

== Cast ==
- Janeth Cuiza as Janeth
- Brian Quispe Cuiza as Brian
- Camila Quispe Cuiza as Camila
- Jhoselyn Quispe Cuiza as Jhoselyn
- David Quispe as David

== Awards ==
Country	Year	Festival
Argentina	2009	Best Documentary del Festival de Gualeguaychú
Guatemala	2008	Best Documentary Extranjero del XI Festival Icaro de Guatemala
Argentina	2008	Prize Best Image Festival de Tucuman Cine.
Argentina	2009	First Prize Zona Centro of Festival ARAN de Neuquen.
Argentina	2009	Grand Prize Federal Amonite (compartido) del Festival ARAN de Neuquen
