= Mariano Raffo =

Argentine film director (born 1973)

- Born: July 26, 1973 (age 53); Buenos Aires, Argentina
- Occupations: Film director, producer, screenwriter.
- Partner: Marina Bools
- Website: https://returntobolivia.blogspot.com/

Mariano Raffo is an Argentine film director. He has made short films, music videos and documentaries.

== Biography ==
=== Home ===
Mariano Raffo was born in Buenos Aires on August 24, 1973. He lived their formative years in Quilmes, where he studied and worked. He taught Video Classes at the Municipal School of Fine Arts in Quilmes, as it relates to other artists of his generation, as Marcelo Vecelich, Juan Manuel Cellini, with whom he wrote the screenplay for a movie ever made, "El Retorno2" and Carlos Spagarino, Cucamonga fri Cultura member in the city of La Plata, with whom the documentary Carrojero were made. He also meet Agustín Ronconi, Arbolito's leader.

=== Studies ===
After the University of Buenos Aires he is entitled Designer in Image and Sound. His collaboration with musician Zelmar Guerin comes from those years, with musical experimentation, video clips, as well as collaboration in design tops Music discs.

=== Cinema ===
His first documentary was Carrojero, about a manufacturer of car wheels in Formosa, Argentina. The screenplay of the work was done in collaboration with Carlos Spagarino. Subsequently, made several shorts that were broadcast on television on Channel 7 television and Channel Encuentro in Argentina. These may include documentaries where people used to working, they like what they do, and tell stories about these jobs, as the production of wine in a house in Quilmes, or a dish of Polish cuisine.

His first film was Return to Bolivia, with the script in collaboration with Marina Bools. Recounts the journey to their country of origin of a Bolivian family who lives in Liniers, Buenos Aires, with a greengrocer. Related as a road-movie, the camera follows a pair of Bolivians with their three children, traveling to the edge of the boundary between Jujuy Province and Tarija, and then go to a village in the highlands between Oruro and La Paz. Shot with limited resources and a minimal film crew that included the director and the film's producer and soundman, Mariana Boolls. This production won several international awards, including the award for Best Foreign Film Festival Icaro XI of Guatemala and the Best Documentary Festival Gualeguaychú. In its premiere on July 2, 2009, received positive reviews.

== Filmography ==
=== Film ===
- Return to Bolivia (2008)

=== Short ===
- Carrojero (2004)
- De Cómo y Donde sacó Don Carlos Aquel Vino
- Barszcz
- Caras (2002)
