= FilmAffinity =

Spanish movie review website launched 2002

- Website type: Film, television film, series database
- Available in: English, Spanish
- Headquarters: Madrid, Spain
- Creators: Pablo Kurt Verdú Schumann; Daniel Nicolás
- Website: filmaffinity.com
- Registration: Optional
- Launched: 2002; 24 years ago
- Current status: Active

FilmAffinity is a movie recommendations website and App created in 2002 in Madrid, Spain, by the film critic Pablo Kurt Verdú Schumann and the programmer Daniel Nicolás. In 2016, the site listed 125,000 movies and series and had 556,000 reviews written by its users.

Registered users can rate movies, find recommended films based on their personal ratings, create any kind of movie lists and – in the Spanish version – write reviews. The site also includes information about contents of the main streaming services, such as Netflix, HBO, Movistar+, Filmin and Rakuten TV. This feature is limited to Netflix in the English version.

It has been noted that FilmAffinity users tend to rate films more severely than IMDb users, resulting in consistently lower average scores.

The site has 3 million unique users in Spain, which accounts for 70% of its total traffic, and serves more than 47 million pages per month worldwide. Advertisements are the site's only income, totaling roughly €500,000 annually.

== International expansion ==
In 2016, the site launched adapted versions for the US, Mexico, Argentina and Chile, offering specific information about release dates for movies, local critics, box office and cinemas. A UK version was later added.

The English version is more limited than the Spanish, not offering the chance for users to write reviews.
