= Jean Palméro =

French politician (1912–1999)

Jean Palméro (17 December 1912, Marseille – 15 January 1999) was a French politician. He represented the French Section of the Workers' International (SFIO) in the National Assembly from 1956 to 1958.
