= Palmera (film) =

- Film poster
- Directed by: Leo Damario
- Written by: Karina Noriega; Leo Damario
- Starring: Micaela Breque; Cecilia Barros; Maca Del Corro; Geraldine Guillermo; Alina Jaume
- Narrated by: Érica García
- Cinematography: Mariano Suarez
- Music by: Carca
- Release date: 8 January 2013
- Running time: 100 minutes
- Country: Argentina
- Language: Spanish

Palmera (English: Palm tree) is a 2013 Argentine independent film directed by Leo Damario and starring Micaela Breque, Ceci Barros, Macarena Del Corro, Alina Jaume, Geraldine Guillermo and Érica García. The plot revolves around a group of six girlfriends who go to a large house in Tigre experimenting with psychoactive drugs, until one of them has a stroke.

The film premiered as the opening film of Proyecciones fuera de la común: Cine + música al aire libre (English: Projections out of the ordinary: cinema + outdoor music), an event held in Ciudad Cultural Konex, Buenos Aires, Argentina. It is also available in Muvi, a social movie platform.

The film features Micaela Breque nude, which drew comparisons between her and the iconic Isabel Sarli.
