= Paco Cabezas =

Spanish film director and screenwriter

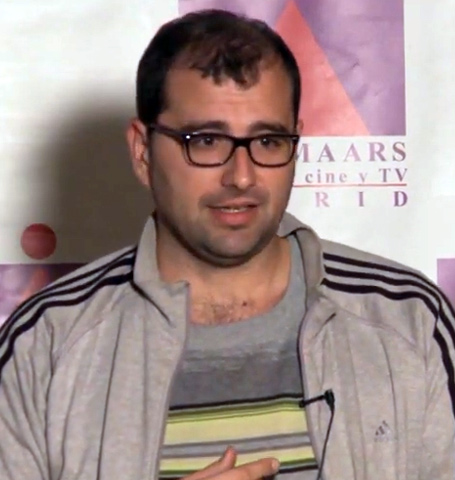
- Cabezas in 2014
- Born: January 11, 1978 (age 48); Seville, Spain
- Occupations: Film director, television director and screenwriter
- Years active: 2000–present

Paco Cabezas (born January 11, 1978) is a Spanish film director and screenwriter, best known for directing The Appeared, Rage and Mr. Right.

== Career ==
In 2007, Cabezas wrote and directed Spanish language horror film The Appeared, following that, in 2008, he wrote the screenplay for the Spanish horror comedy film Sexykiller. In 2009, he wrote the script for the comedy film Spanish Movie. In 2010, he wrote the script for the romantic drama Bon Appétit and also wrote and directed action comedy film Neon Flesh.

In 2014, Cabezas directed and wrote the first ceremony of the Feroz Awards. He also directed action-crime film Rage starring Nicolas Cage, Rachel Nichols, Peter Stormare, and Danny Glover. Scripted by Jim Agnew and Sean Keller, the film was released on May 9, 2014 by Image Entertainment, and it was Cabezas' American debut film.

In 2015, Cabezas directed an action-comedy romance film Mr. Right based on the script by Max Landis. The film starred Sam Rockwell, Anna Kendrick, Tim Roth, James Ransone, Anson Mount, Michael Eklund and RZA. The film got the closing night premiere at the 2015 Toronto International Film Festival.

== Filmography ==
=== Film ===
Year	Title	Director	Writer	Notes
2000	Invasión Travesti	Yes	Yes	
2007	The Appeared	Yes	Yes	
2008	Sexykiller	No	Yes	
2009	Spanish Movie	No	Yes	
2010	Bon Appétit	No	Yes	
2010	Neon Flesh	Yes	Yes	
2014	Rage	Yes	No	
2015	Mr. Right	Yes	No	
2019	Bye	Yes	No	

=== Television ===
Year	Title	Director	Writer	Producer	Notes
2005	Neon Flesh	No	Yes	Supervising	Writer, supervising producer (36 episodes)
2005–2006	Bones	No	Yes	Yes	Writer (3 episodes), producer (21 episodes)
2014	I Premios Feroz	Yes	Yes	No	TV special
2016–2019	Penny Dreadful	Yes	No	No	TV special
2016	Dirk Gently's Holistic Detective Agency	Yes	No	No	
2017–2018	Into the Badlands	Yes	No	No	
2017	The Strain	Yes	No	No	
2017	Fear the Walking Dead	Yes	No	No	
2018	The Alienist	Yes	No	No	
2019	Deadly Class	Yes	No	No	
2019	American Gods	Yes	No	No	
2020	Penny Dreadful: City of Angels	Yes	No	No	
2022	In From the Cold	Yes	No	No	
2022–2024	The Umbrella Academy	Yes	No	No	
2022	The Gypsy Bride	Yes	No	No	
2023	The Purple Network	Yes	No	Executive	Also creator
2025	Wednesday	Yes	No	No	Season 2, Episodes 2 and 3
2025	The Walking Dead: Daryl Dixon	Yes	No	No	Season 3, Episodes 4 and 5
