= Sabrina Garciarena =

Argentine actress and model (born 1983)

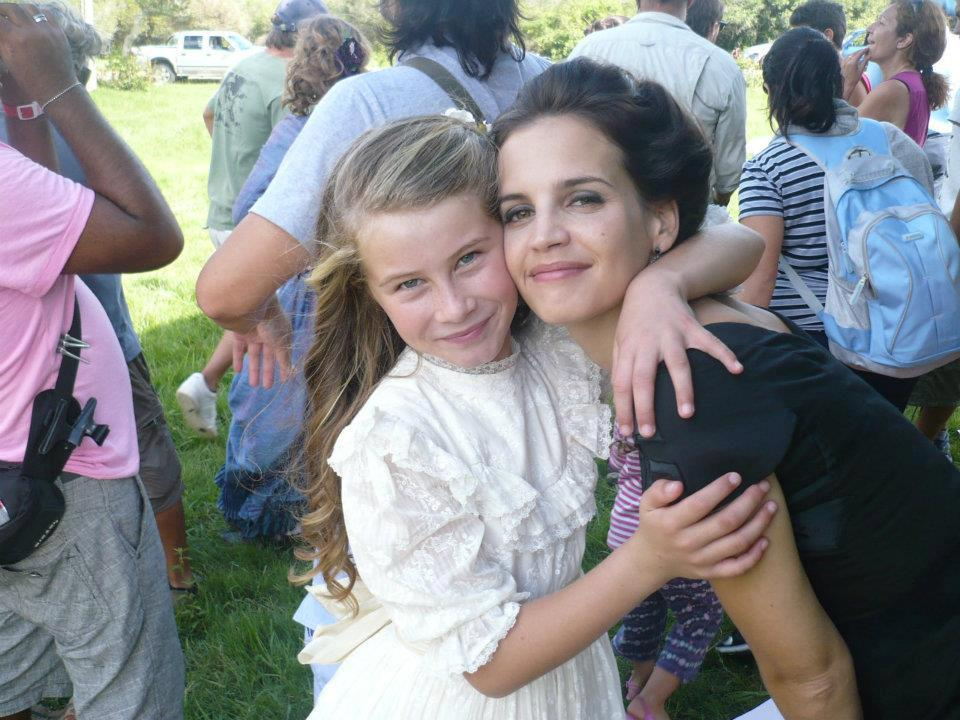
- Sabrina Garciarena (on the right)
- Born: Sabrina Paola Garciarena; July 19, 1983 (age 43); Ramos Mejía, Buenos Aires, Argentina
- Occupations: Actor and model
- Years active: 1998–present
- Height: 1.60 m (5 ft 3 in)
- Partner: Germán Paoloski (2009–present)
- Children: 3

Sabrina Paola Garciarena (born July 19, 1983) is an Argentine actress and model.

== Biography ==
Sabrina Paola Garciarena was born on Julissa 19, 1983 in Ramos Mejía, Buenos Aires, Argentina. She is the daughter of Susana and Osvaldo. She has one brother and three sisters. Sabrina Garciarena studied at Colegio Don Bosco. Sabrina is Roman Catholic.

== Personal life ==
Sabrina Garciarena does not like to speak publicly about her private life.

Since 2009, Sabrina Garciarena is in a relationship with the journalist Germán Paoloski. On April 1, 2014, she gave birth to the couple's first child, a boy, whom they called León Paoloski, who was born in the Clínica Maternidad Suizo Argentina. On May 22, 2017, Beltrán Paoloski was born by Caesarean section, who was born in the Clínica Maternidad Suizo Argentina. On May 5, 2020, she gave birth to the couple's third child, a girl, whom they called Mía Paoloski. Sabrina Garciarena lives in Buenos Aires, Argentina with Germán Paoloski and her children.

== Career ==
Sabrina Garciarena first steps were in Verano del '98 in 1998.

After a few years in her native Argentina, Sabrina traveled to Spain to succeed as an actress. She changed managers and made several castings.

In 2007, she starred in the movie Tocar el cielo.

In 2008, in Spain, she shot the series Cuestión de sexo with Diego Peretti and in the cinema, shared prominence with the Spanish actor and comedian Gorka Otxoa in Pagafantas.

In 2009, she returned to Argentina to star in the movie Felicitas from Teresa Costantini. For this work she has won the Silver Condor Award as a Female Revelation. In 2009 she participated in a charity album for Sahara schools with the song Chas! y aparezco a tu lado next to the group Supersubmarina for Sony Music.

From 2010 to 2012, she starred in the miniseries Terra ribelle issued by Rai 1 set in 19th century, together with Anna Favella and Rodrigo Guirao Díaz. In 2012, she finished filming the miniseries Terra ribelle and the same producer proposed to travel to Tunisia to film L`ombra del destino.

In 2011, she worked in Spain in Física o Química issued by Antena 3. In 2011, she debuted in the first episode of television series Maltratadas.

Sabrina, is the protagonist of the video clip Sin ti, sin mí from Ricardo Arjona and Sabrina participated in the video clip Hasta cuando from Diego Torres.

In 2015, she starred with Benjamín Vicuña the movie Baires.

In 2016, she starred in the television series Los ricos no piden permiso with Araceli González, Luciano Castro, Agustina Cherri, Gonzalo Heredia, Juan Darthes, Eva De Dominici, Nicolás Riera and Laura Laprida.

In 2017, she made a participation in the television series Golpe al corazón.

In 2018, she made her musical comedy debut in the classic El violinista en el tejado starring opposite Raúl Lavié.

== Filmography ==
=== Television ===
| Year | Title | Character | Channel |
|---|---|---|---|
| 1998 | Verano del '98 | Morita | Telefe |
| 2001 | EnAmorArte | Tatiana Ruiz | Telefe |
| 2001 | Propiedad Horizontal | Romina | Canal 9 |
| 2002 | Rebelde Way | Luz Viviana Leguizamon | Canal 9 |
| 2003 | Costumbres argentinas | Laura Saldaña | Telefe |
| 2004 | Culpable de este amor | Verónica Iglesias | Telefe |
| 2005 | Amor en Custodia | Milagros Bazterrica Achaval Urien | Telefe |
| 2005 | Una Familia Especial | Selena Schneider | Canal 13 |
| 2005–2006 | Se dice amor | Magdalena "Maggie" Benegas | Telefe |
| 2006–2007 | La ley del amor | Carolina Conforte | Telefe |
| 2008 | Cuestión de sexso | Alicia Rojas | Cuatro |
| 2010 | L'ombra del destino | Teresa Coppola | Canale 5/Rete 4 |
| 2010–2012 | Terra ribelle | Luisa Giardini | Rai 1 |
| 2011 | Física o Química | Sara Pires | Antena 3 |
| 2011 | Maltratadas | Victoria | América TV |
| 2013 | Historias de corazón | Roxy | Telefe |
| 2014 | Milagros en campaña | Malena | Canal 9 |
| 2016 | Los ricos no piden permiso | Ana Villalba | Canal 13 |
| 2017 | Siete vuelos | Clara Montes | TV Pública |
| 2017 | Golpe al corazón | Paula Solano de Farias | Telefe |

=== Movies ===
| Year | Movie | Character | Director |
|---|---|---|---|
| 2006 | La leyenda del gauchito Gil: La Sangre Inocente | Julieta | Ricardo Becher |
| 2007 | Condón Express | Tatiana | Luis Pietro |
| 2007 | Tocar el cielo | Lucía | Marcos Carnevale |
| 2009 | Felicitas | Felicitas Guerrero | María Teresa Costantini |
| 2009 | Friend Zone | Claudia | Borja Cobeaga |
| 2010 | Amor en tránsito | Mercedes | Lucas Blanco |
| 2011 | Solos en la ciudad | Florencia | Diego Corsini |
| 2012 | Sola contigo | María | Alberto Lecchi |
| 2015 | Baires | Trini | Marcelo Paez Cubell |
| 2015 | Los inocentes | Bianca | Mauricio Brunettil |
| 2020 | Esencial | Nadia | |

=== Theater ===
| Year | Title | Character | Director |
|---|---|---|---|
| 2012 | Revelados en Blanco & Negro | Helena | Federico Palazzo |
| 2015 | Hembras | Salvadora Medina Onrubia | Teresa Constantini |
| 2018 | El violinista en el tejado | Tzeitel | Gustavo Zajac |
| 2021 | Madres, el musical | Dani | Josefina Pieres |

=== Videoclips ===
| Year | Artist | Song |
|---|---|---|
| 2006 | Diego Torres | Hasta Cuándo |
| 2008 | Ricardo Arjona | Sin Ti... Sin Mi |

== Awards and nominations ==
| Year | Award | Category | Work | Result |
|---|---|---|---|---|
| 2010 | Silver Condor Awards | Female Revelation | Felicitas | Winner |
