= Los ricos no piden permiso =

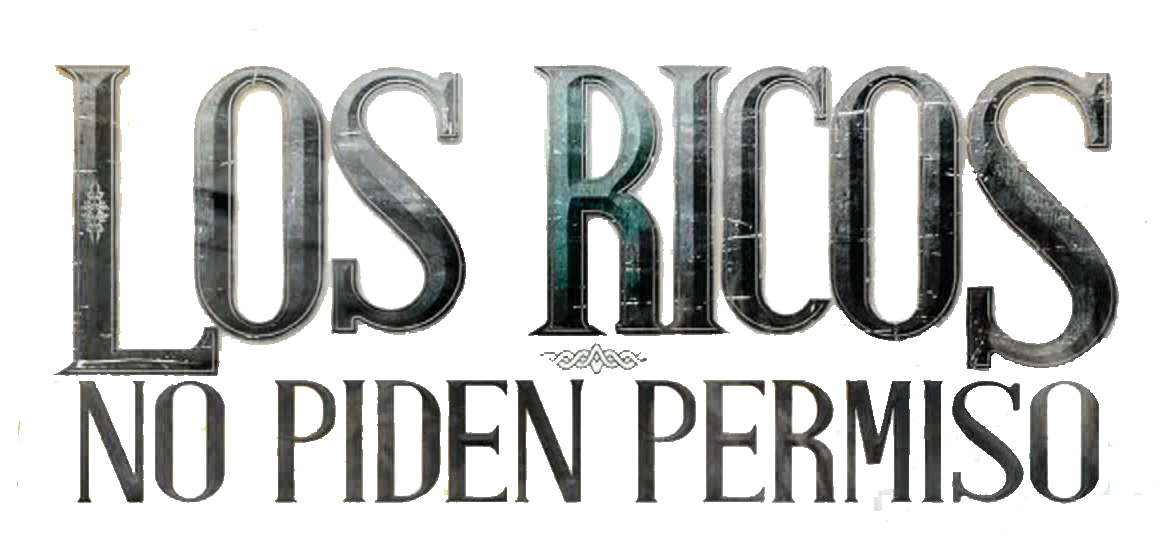
- Genre: Telenovela
- Created by: Adrián Suar
- Written by: Marcos Carnevale; Willy Van Broock; Jessica Valls; Christian Basilis
- Directed by: Gustavo Luppi; Rodolfo Antúnez
- Starring: Agustina Cherri; Luciano Castro; Araceli González; Juan Darthés; Gonzalo Heredia; Sabrina Garciarena; Raúl Taibo; Luciano Cáceres; Julieta Cardinali; Alberto Ajaka; Leonor Benedetto
- Opening theme: Voy a amarte by Carlos Rivera
- Country of origin: Argentina
- Original language: Spanish
- No. of seasons: 1
- No. of episodes: 225

Production
- Executive producer: Leonardo Blanco
- Producer: Adrián Suar
- Production location: Buenos Aires, Argentina
- Editors: Juan Pablo Lloret; Juan Martín
- Running time: 45-50 minutes
- Production company: Pol-ka

Original release
- Network: Canal 13
- Release: 11 January – 26 December 2016

Related
- Esperanza mía; Quiero vivir a tu lado

Los ricos no piden permiso is a 2016 Argentine telenovela produced by Pol-ka and broadcast by Canal 13, which premiered on 11 January 2016 and ended on 26 December 2016. Starring Agustina Cherri, Gonzalo Heredia, Luciano Cáceres, Luciano Castro, Araceli González and Juan Darthés. Co-starring Sabrina Garciarena and Alberto Ajaka. With the antagonistic participations of Julieta Cardinali, Eva De Dominici, Viviana Saccone. With the participation of the first actors Raúl Taibo and Leonor Benedetto. With the performances of Leonor Manso, Nicolás Riera, Alberto Martín, Malena Solda, Guillermo Arengo and Miriam Odorico. With the participation of the first actress Norma Aleandro. With the special participation of the actors Adrián Navarro, Bárbara Lombardo, Esteban Pérez, Mariano Torre and Gigí Ruá. It was transmitted from Monday to Thursday at 11 p.m., then at 10 p.m. and then transmitted from Monday to Friday at 9:30 p.m., on the screen of Canal 13. Finally, it was broadcast at the same time but from Monday to Thursday.

== Plot ==
The series focuses on the employers and employees of Santa Elena, a great stay that is under the matriarchal command of Angélica Cerviño (Norma Aleandro). The Villalba have to go through situations of pain, love, conflict, power and sadness throughout history. The joy takes place when the wedding of the youngest son of the family, Agustín (Gonzalo Heredia, takes place, who marries his girlfriend Josefina (Eva De Dominici) in the stay.

The next day, the entire stay will be affected in a horrific tragedy: Angélica's death, which after arguing for a will of her late husband, is mysteriously found dead. Her death was thought to be suicide, but the real mystery begins when the town commissioner reveals that it was a murder.

Initially the series also shows Rafael's love triangle, the foreman, (Luciano Castro), Julia, the teacher, (Araceli González), who was mistreated by her ex-husband Esteban (Rafael Ferro) who is killed by the police after taking Julia, holding her in a house and then kidnapped by Ulysses (Adrián Navarro), Antonio's old friend (Juan Darthés), the third in discord between Rafa and Julia, has a daughter, Clara (Guadalupe Manent), and allegedly lost his wife Laura (Viviana Saccone) in an accident, to reappear later saying she was kidnapped for six years of her disappearance, but in reality she was in Colombia waiting for Lisandro (Raúl Taibo), the brother of Angélica's late husband. One foreman, the other employer; both will cross their paths and face each other for the love of the new teacher. The problem is that Rafael, later finds out that he is the son of Inés Echegoyen (Gigí Ruá), who is then killed in an operation by Luciana (Juana Viale) who wanted staying with the inheritance, Rafael began a relationship with her after being in an accident on the street; but he will also feel a strong attraction for Victoria (Julieta Cardinali), a biochemist who interned her sister Teresa (María Abadi), whom she accused of her mother's death, and Ana (Sabrina Garciarena), her employer, who is taken as crazy, since she was ill medicated for 15 years. Ana was in love with Rafael all her life, but he never looked at her until she arrived with a new boyfriend who allegedly returned her sanity after being hospitalized after an attack. Her boyfriend Gabriel (Esteban Pérez) is with her for her money even if she tries to deny it, when her sister Sol (Jazmín Falak) appears, saying after learning that Ana loves Rafa, that he loves her for her money. It also meant that they were relatives of Luciana and Ines. Then Gabriel threatens her not to say it and invents that she has mental problems. Love is also addressed between Elena (Agustina Cherri), a maid who is Lisandro's unrecognized daughter and Agustín, the youngest son of the Villalba family, who is an inveterate drunk, this relationship will be constantly threatened Josefina, Agustín's wife, and Pedro (Mariano Torre), Elena's husband, who besides being a policeman, even sleeps with Josefina and has a son with her to separate Agustín from Elena.

There are also the stories of the other employees: Esther (Leonor Manso), Rafael's adoptive mother who had an affair with the current priest of the town, Evaristo (Alberto Martín); Marisol (Malena Solda) who only tries to look for her lost son, "El Negro" (Alberto Ajaka), who will do everything possible to hide Julian (Federico Barga), the lost son of his cousin Marisol; Juan Domingo (Nicolás Riera), a pawn who first falls in love with Elena and then with Emilia (Laura Laprida), a stagnant; Cuca (Miriam Odorico), an employee who does not look for anything out of the ordinary but will be very flushed by Osvaldo (Guillermo Arengo), who is in love with her and Jackie (Bárbara Lombardo), a Maid who comes to the stay fleeing justice.

Bernarda (Leonor Benedetto), in addition to killing Angélica along with Marcial and being the lover of "El Negro", knows with Esther and Marisol that Lisandro and Laura are lovers and that they will do everything to stay together and stop the Julia and Antonio's relationship, from pretending that Laura is invalid, to free Julia's kidnapper and kill Bernarda.

Finally, a deep story. It is a lagoon of the room that according to Marcial (Luciano Cáceres), the current mayor of La Cruz, has healing properties. Thanks to this, Marcial, along with Victoria and Lisandro, will carry out many experiments to "contribute to science". What Marcial really wanted is to use this water to heal his father Humberto (Carlos Weber), who has been in a coma for a long time. When his father wakes up, he tells Marcial that he had a son with Angélica. Marcial knowing this, he starts looking for his lost brother to make his life impossible. In that conversation he kills his father. And then he finds out that his brother is Agustín. Marcial joins with Josefina to destroy Agustín since he sleeps with the maid Elena and Josefina wants revenge. Therefore, one day after many conflicts, Marcial shoots Agustín and is helped by Pedro to make everything look like it was suicide. Agustín is resurrected thanks to Victoria, who injected the formula of the lagoon. But when you revive you have memory loss.

Although all these stories take their course, they all intertwine with several aspects: the death of Angelica, the end of finding her murderer, the healing lagoon and the greed to possess her, in addition to the different love relationships of the inhabitants of Santa Elena. The problem is that after Angélica's death, nothing will be as before. For none of the inhabitants of the room will be seen with the same eyes and all will suspect everyone because of ambition.

=== The End ===
After Antonio lets Laura and Lisandro escape, the Santa Elena stay prepares for Esther's birthday and retirement. Agustín and Elena are happy after Pedro was arrested and they adopted a baby named Benito Villalba, the youngest of the Villalba has become a writer while Ana and Rafael wait for their first child, after Sol betrayed his brother Gabriel is arrested . The Negro who is now rich for "winning the lottery" returns in search of Jackie and reconciles with Marisol. Antonio and Julia live their happiest moment with Clarita. Commissioner Peralta arrives at the room to tell Antonio that Laura and Lisandro had had an accident after the brakes failed causing the death of Lisandro and the disappearance of Laura, who after all was kidnapped by the maniac of Ulisses in search of revenge. On the other hand, Marcial who is isolated from everyone and with a personality problem believing that he is his mother is visited by Victoria, who is going to Sweden to continue the investigation of the formula. When she said goodbye to Marcial she told him that she never hated someone with as much love as she had done with him. Already at the party Juan Domingo and Emilia return from their trip and talk with Cuca and Osvaldo, who were in charge of the bar.

== Production ==
The first episode had a cameo by the actress Norma Aleandro, whose character is killed at the end of the episode. She returned to the telenovela when Bernarda was killed, as a ghost who takes her to the afterlife.

Initially, the characters of Castro and González were meant to become a couple, but according to González, the writers kept her with Darthes because of the positive reception to the couple. Castro was upset because of those comments, because he had initially suggested the producer Adrián Suar to take González for the role. He requested the writers to make some other romance for him, and for this purpose Juana Viale joined the cast in July.

Benedetto and Ajaka were removed from the telenovela when their contracts expired. The characters of Benedetto were killed, and Ajaka escaped from the police.

== Cast ==
- Agustina Cherri as Elena Rodríguez/Elena Villalba
- Gonzalo Heredia as Agustín Villalba/Agustín Campos
- Luciano Castro as Rafael Medina/Rafael Echegoyen
- Araceli González as Julia Monterrey
- Juan Darthés as Antonio Villalba
- Luciano Cáceres as Marcial Campos
- Julieta Cardinali as Victoria Levingston
- Sabrina Garciarena as Ana Villalba
- Eva De Dominici as Josefina Mansilla de Villalba
- Nicolás Riera as Juan Domingo Juárez
- Adrián Navarro as Ulises Mendizábal
- Norma Aleandro as Angélica Cerviño Vda. de Villalba
- Raúl Taibo as Lisandro Villalba
- Leonor Manso as Esther Barrientos
- Alberto Martín as Evaristo Rossi
- Carlos Weber as Humberto Campos
- Facundo Espinosa as Ignacio del Puerto/Ignacio Villalba
- Ezequiel Rodríguez as Sebastián Yañez
- José Quiroga as García
- Gabriel López as López
- Manuel Carrasco as himself
- Leonor Benedetto as Bernarda Cerviño
- Gigí Ruá as Inés Echegoyen
- Alberto Ajaka as Hugo "El Negro" Funes
- Malena Solda as Marisol Falcón de Villalba
- Guillermo Arengo as Osvaldo Rolón
- Miriam Odorico as Luisa "Cuca" Domínguez
- Rafael Ferro as Esteban Moroni
- Viviana Saccone as Laura Faraón de Villalba
- Bárbara Lombardo as Jaquelín "Jackie" Ayala
- Esteban Pérez as Gabriel Márquez
- Juana Viale as Luciana Márquez
- Mariano Torre as Pedro Santibáñez
- María Abadi as Teresa Levingston
- Juan Manuel Guilera as Iván González
- Ernesto López as Lucio Giménez
- David Páez as Tobías Pedraza
- Javier Drolas as Felipe Cardozo
- Roxana Berco as Margarita González
- Laura Laprida as Emilia Méndez
- Martín Gervasoni as Aníbal Zamudio
- Guadalupe Manent as Clara Villalba Faraón
- Ana Doval as María Elena Rodríguez
- Carla Pandolfi as María Eugenia Rodríguez
- Javier de Nevares as Javier Monterrey
- Ignacio Sureda as Cándido López
- Pablo Cerri as Pablo Ramírez
- Gonzalo Urtizberea as Wilson Undécimo Valderrama
- Claudio Sirna as José Pedernera
- Lili Popovich as María Estela Arriaga
- Marcos Kolmaier as Juan Cruz Méndez
- Edgardo Marchiori as Carlos Beltrán
- Antonella Lagamba as Estela Fabricio
- Isabella Dellepiane as Hermenegilda Paulena
- Juan Ignacio Di Marco as Gerónimo Uribe
- Ana María de Mateo as Edelmira Carranza/Santa Elena
- Rodrigo Rocco as Rolando Saladina
- Hernán Pablo Martínez as Alfonso García
- Federico Barga as Julián Falcón/Ramiro Falcón
- Matías Salvatierra as Lito Ibáñez
- Flavio León Díaz as Diego Fernando Villalobos
- Jazmín Falak as Sol Márquez Olivera
- María Cecilia Rapacini as Mabel Villalba
- Marcelo Abbate as Francisco Cisnero
- Héctor Calori as Commissioner Diego Peralta
- Rubén Stella as Commissioner Gutiérrez
- Alejandro Polledo as Prosecutor Villanueva
- Alejandro Martínez as Benito Villalba
- José Aramburu as Benito Villalba

(first year)

- Roberto Vallejos as Dardo
- Martín Tecchi as Genaro
- Darío Levy as Rogelio
- Andrés Gioeni as Alfredo
- Juan Smiljan como Mario
- Franco Bruzzone as "Josecito"
- Pablo Pinto as Linceto
- Fabricio Villagra as "Turco"
- Mariano Longo as Vega
- Diego Doello as Farías
- Hernán Statuto as Zurdo
- Osvaldo Aldama as Martínez
- Roberto Caute as Stepfather of Marisol

== Reception ==
The telenovela was first aired nearing the end of the successful Esperanza mía. That telenovela had a rating of 12.6 and Los ricos... grew it to 13.7, against 12.4 for ¿Qué culpa tiene Fatmagul? in Telefe. Telefe opposed it with their own telenovela, La Leona, and both ones got similar ratings. Telefe then tried with another production, Educando a Nina, which got higher ratings.

== Awards ==
=== Nominations ===
- 47th Martín Fierro Awards
  - Best daily fiction
