= Kim Dong-yeon =

Kim Dong-yeon may refer to:

- Kim Dong-yeon (director)
- Kim Dong-yeon (politician)
