= Do What You Want (film) =

- Directed by: Orestes Trucco
- Written by: Salvador Valverde Calvo
- Produced by: Orestes Trucco
- Starring: Raúl Taibo; Amalia Scaliter; Gilda Lousek; Ricardo Bauleo
- Cinematography: Humberto Peruzzi
- Edited by: Atilio Rinaldi
- Music by: Ohari and J. Rodríguez Pilado
- Release date: August 30, 1973
- Running time: 90 minutes
- Country: Argentina
- Language: Spanish
- Budget: $ 700.000

Do What You Want, also known as When love comes (original title: Hipólito y Evita), is a 1973 Argentine romantic comedy film directed by Orestes A. Trucco and starring Raúl Taibo, Amalia Scaliter, Gilda Lousek y Ricardo Bauleo. It was written by Salvador Valverde Calvo and shot in General Rodríguez.

== Synopsis ==
A retelling on the Romeo and Juliet story, with the lovers' families at odds with each other over their different socio-political backgrounds. Hipolito's family is aristocratic and pro-Hipólito Yrigoyen, who was twice president of Argentina and co-founded the Radical Civic Union, a social liberal political party; while Evita comes from a working-class background and a family that supports Eva Perón and her husband Juan Perón, who was three times president and gave his name to the political movement known as Peronism, which in present-day Argentina is represented mainly by the Justicialist Party.

== Cast ==
- Raúl Taibo - Hipólito Montero
- Amalia Scaliter - Evita Capobianco
- Gilda Lousek
- Ricardo Bauleo - Padre Lorenzo
- Ubaldo Martínez
- Guillermo Battaglia
- Julio De Grazia - Beto
- Víctor Bó - Ángel
- Ricardo Passano
- Francisco de Paula
- José Luis Mazza - Marco
- Tony Vilas
- Delfy de Ortega
- Nelly Panizza
- César Bertrand
- Sabina Olmos
- Eduardo Trucco
