= Kim Dong-yeon (director) =

South Korean director and playwright (born 1975)

- 김동연
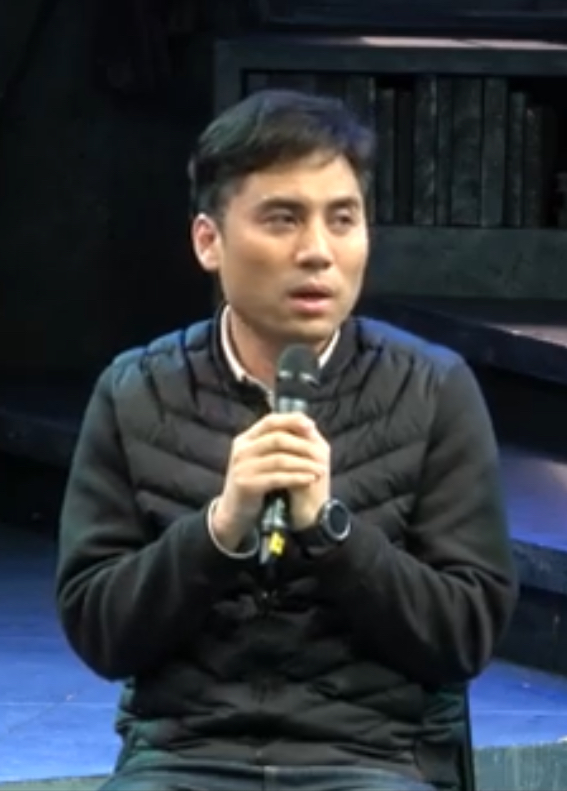
- Kim Dong-yeon 2018
- Born: June 28, 1975 (age 51); South Korea
- Other name: Kim Dong-yun
- Education: Department of Theater of Chung-Ang University
- Occupations: Playwright; Musical and Stage Director
- Years active: 2003 - present
- Agent(s): Poet and Samurai Theater Company
- Spouse: Unknown
- Children: 1 Child, Unknown

Korean name
- Hangul: 김동연
- RR: Gim Dongyeon
- MR: Kim Tongyŏn

Kim Dong-yeon (Korean: 김동연; born June 28, 1975), a South Korean playwright and theater director, is also known as the Blue Chip Director of Daehak-ro. He made his directorial debut in 2003 with the play "Fantasy Fairy Tale." One of his most famous works as a director is the South Korean musical Maybe Happy Ending, which premiered in 2017. Kim is also recognized for his military musicals The Shinheung Military Academy (2018) and Return (2019). Additionally, he has directed the South Korean adaptations of stage plays such as Human (2010), The Pride (2014), M. Butterfly (2017), Shakespeare R&J (2018), and Touching the Void (2022).

== Early life and education ==
Kim Dong-yeon joined a theater club in high school to pursue his dream of becoming an actor. He dedicated himself to practicing vocalization in the backyard near his high school and later enrolled in the theater department at Chung-Ang University. While performing on stage as an actor during his college days, he discovered that he was better suited to be a theatre director.

In 2001, Kim reconstructed Shakespeare's Hamlet into a play titled "Hamlet - The Story of a Sad Clown." He directed a university performance of the play, and his fellow student at the university, Kim Kang-woo, was cast as Hamlet.

== Career ==
=== Early career as assistant director and debut as Director ===
In his 20s, Kim was uncertain about pursuing a career as a director and questioned his talent. After graduating, he worked as staff for Persona Productions (페르소나 프로덕션), the company behind Nanta (난타) and Jump (난타), for two years. Then, He served as the artistic director of magic performances for Lee Eun-gyeol's Magic Concert.

In 2003, Kim made his playwriting and directorial debut with the play "Fantasy Fairy Tale" as part of the 6th Seoul Frontier Theater Festival (Note: Seoul Marginal Theater Festival or Seoul Edge Theater Festival or Seoul Frontier Theater Festival which started in 1999 as a 'show of the secrets of young directors', is a contemporary performing arts festival that seeks to capture the aesthetic originality and social context of the work from the perspective of 'the border'.) at the Hakjeon Blue Small Theater in November. The play received positive feedback for its fairytale-like stage, beautiful dialogue, and solid dramatic structure. However, Kim was disappointed by the short performance duration of one week and the high production costs. This experience made him realize the challenges of staff composition in theater production.

Fantasy Fairy Tale showcases Kim fascination with clowns as ironic beings that bring laughter while expressing sadness. The play features three clowns: the war clown, the art clown, and the love clown, who narrate the love story between Hans, a piano player who lost his hearing during the war, and Marie, a dancer who lost her sight, in a warm and lyrical manner. Although categorized as a play, the performance incorporated elements of music, songs, and dance akin to a musical, thanks to the clowns' play-within-a-play concept.

"I thought, why not put dance, music, and theater together and give the three attributes of love, art, and war to a clown? It's a story about dreaming and loving even though the world seems like war. Even though I know that it's difficult, I don't want to give up theater. “It was like my story."

Kim established one-man troupe "The Poet and the Warrior" (극단 시인과 무사). A poet using a pen, a Warrior using a sword. he named the theater company by combining occupations with conflicting personalities implied Director Kim's attitude toward theater. "Play itself is as romantic as the work of a poet. However, there were many people around me who only loved theater and gave up. I thought, Why is that so? and also thought that I should also draw a sword to face the world. I’m thinking about doing a romantic yet intense play for a long time.

To further develop "Fantasy Fairy Tale," Kim actively pursued funding opportunities for the production. In December 2004, the Seoul Foundation for Arts and Culture fund application was disqualified. In April 2005, he faced another rejection. In September 2005, the project was disqualified from the Young Director Contest Showcase Performance. In October 2005, there was no communication regarding the success of the performance at the Seoul Art Market. Kim continued to seek funding, applying for the Korea Culture and Arts Council Fund, but was unsuccessful.

In 2006, Kim collaborated with Performance Planning Eda as the director of Patrick Süskind's play Der Kontrabaß. Myeong Gye-nam performed an extended monologue as a double bass player, speaking to the audience from his small sound-proofed apartment while enjoying a beer. Myung Gye-nam returned to this role after a 10-year, marking his theater comeback following Neulgeun Thief 3 years ago. Actress Seong Hyun-ah makes a special appearance in the play. The performance ran from February 7 to March 5 at Woori Theater in Daehakro.

After undergoing extensive revision and supplementation, the play was successfully staged in Daehakro in 2006, three years after its initial premiere. The production received funding from the Seoul Foundation for Arts and Culture. The 'Seoul Performing Artists' Group', consisting mainly of theater artists who participated in the Seoul Frontier Theater Festival, presented the play at Sangmyung Art Hall 1 in Daehakro, Seoul from September 14 to October 1, 2006. The cast included Choi Dae-hoon as War Clown, Oh Yong as Art Clown, Choi Yo-han as Love Clown, Song Hee-jin in the role of Marie, and Seong Jong-wan as Hans.

The Fantasy Fairy Tale production achieved commercial success when it was co-produced with Performance Planning Eda in March 2007. Eda Entertainment's CEO Sang-won acquired Daehak-ro Shinsi Musical Theater and transformed it into "Cultural Space Eda" in Daehak-ro. The inaugural production chosen for the 'Eda's Stage Discovery Series' was "Fantasy Fairy Tale," which ran from April 5, 2007, to July 1, 2007. This collaboration led to the development of a dedicated fan base.

The performances continued until 2013, featuring characters like the love clown (Lee Hyun-cheol and Lee Won), the art clown (Song Jae-ryong and Seong Jong-wan), the war clown (Kim Tae-geun, Hwang Ji-no), Hans (Kim Ho-jin and Shin Seong-min), and the standout character Marie (played by Kim Bo-geum).

Fantasy Fairy Tale" was performed on stage at Cotton Hall, Dongduk Women's University Performing Arts Center from December 21 to March 1, 2020. The play created a buzz in Daehakro when star actor Kang Ha-neul, known for his role as 'Yong-sik' in the popular KBS 2TV drama "When the Camellia Blooms," appeared in the production.

=== Early career as director and popularity due to Infinity Challenge ===
In 2006, Kim started directing a joint production between Performance Planning Eda and 2B Company. The production was Cha Geun-ho's play "70 Minutes of Romance." Originally performed in 2000 and 2003 at small theaters in Hyehwa-dong 1 and Batangol under the title "The Origin of Love," the play had sold-out shows. The title was later changed to "Love for 70 Minutes," and the script was extensively revised for a 2005 performance in Daehangno. The 70-minute romance "He & She" premiered from December 20, 2006, to March 4, 2007, at the Happy Theater, featuring Ha Seong-gwang, Seo Jeong-yeon, and Jang Seong-ik.

In October 2007, Kim took over as the director of the musical "Finding Kim Jong-wook," which was a successful production by playwright-turned-director Jang Yoo-jeong in 2006. He joined during season 3 and transformed the format into an open run starting from season 4, which began on April 14, 2009. Kim continued to lead the musical until 2013.

In 2008, Kim wrote and directed the play "Doctor Irabu," a Korean adaptation of the popular Japanese writer Hideo Okuda's compilation of short stories Psychiatrist Irabu series (精神科医・伊良部シリーズ). The play featured fictionalpsychiatrist Dr. Ichirō Irabu (伊良部 一郎, Irabu Ichirō) and his three patient stories. Two stories were adapted from the book "In the Pool" (イン・ザ・プール). The first story, "Companion" (コンパニオン), focused on Hiromi Yasukawa, an aspiring actress with a phobia of stalkers. The second story, "Leave it alone" (勃ちっ放し), centered on Tetsuya Taguchi, a 35-year-old timid office worker with Priapism. The third story was adapted from the book "Flying Trapeze" (空中ブランコ) and titled "Hedgehog" (ハリネズミ), which followed Seiji Ino, a young yakuza leader with a phobia of spiky objects or aichmophobia. The play premiered on October 18, 2008.

In 2009, Kim directed the South Korean adaptation of the play My First Time, by Ken Davenport, a two-time Tony Award-winning theatre producer and playwright. The play features four actors portraying 18 stories collected from 40,000 cases worldwide, with audience participation to complete the narrative. Contrasting with The Vagina Monologues, which explores sex through candid monologues about the female genitalia, My First Time can be seen as a "Vagina Dialogue." Known for its bold and explicit content, the play addresses topics like rape, incest, and first experiences of homosexuality. The play was showing at Daehakro Arts Center until March 31.

In the same year, Kim directed 'Hamlet - The Story of a Sad Clown'. The play intertwines the stories of young Hamlet (Choi Seol-hwa) and adult Hamlet (Oh Yong) through the character of the young clown Yorick (Choi Yo-han). In this adaptation, Hamlet stages a play called 'The Murder of Gonzago' to uncover the truth about his father's death. The play mirrors Hamlet's own family tragedy, leading him to seek revenge. Kim imagines that Hamlet learned acting from Yorick in his childhood, making the lines from the play a poignant reflection of his life. The final scene, where young Hamlet expresses a desire to only perform cheerful comedies, adds a touching layer to the story. This version was a revision of the play with the same name that was performed in his school performance in 2001. The production ran at Culture Space EDA from January 29 to 31, 2009.

In 2010, Kim collaborated with 2B Company and Chungmu Art Center on a Korean production of "Human," adapted from the play "Nos Amis Les Humains" by French writer Bernard Werber. "Human" is a two-hander play that explores the relationship between scientist Raul and animal trainer Samanta. The play delves into the theme of human nature through the unique perspective of characters who wake up one day to find themselves separated by a glass wall, highlighting the artist's imaginative approach to storytelling.

In November 2011, Kim joined the 2nd Kim Soo-ro Project to produce a musical adaptation of Coffee Prince, based on the novel by Lee Seon-mi. The novel had already been adapted into a television series by MBC. The musical script was adapted by Kim and Jung Min-ah, who also wrote the lyrics. Lee Jin-wook composed the music, with Yang Joo-in as the music director and Kyung-yeop as the choreographer. The musical focused on the romance between Choi Han-gyeol and Go Eun-chan. Kim Jae-beom and Kim Tae-han were double-cast as Choi Han-gyeol, while Yu Joo-hye and Hong Ji-hee played Go Eun-chan.

Kim gained widespread recognition through his appearance on popular MBC TV show Infinite Challenge. He participated in the 'I'm a Singer In My Own Right' segment of the show, which aired for three episodes: Episode 281 (December 24, 2011), Episode 282 (December 31, 2011), and Episode 283 (January 7, 2012). In this segment, Jung Hyung-don was assigned to cover the song "Spring Chicken Soup" (영계백숙) by Yoon Jong-shin, originally sung by Jung Jun-ha and After School. Jung Hyung-don decided to present the song in a musical performance format due to its storytelling lyrics.

The show's director, Kim Tae-ho held a meeting with Kim Dong-yeon to ask him to direct the performance. Won Mi-sol joined as the music director and Kim Kyung-yeop as the choreographer. They also collaborated with the Nam Musical Academy. The concept for the performance was a heroic story in a musical-style stage with costumes inspired by the Roman era. The stage featured a female vocalist appearing as a goddess, surrounded by nine musical actresses who danced and sang alongside her. Jung Hyung-don later appeared as a Roman general, accompanied by four musical actors.

In 2012, Kim worked with Argentine director Gustavo Zajac in stage musical adaptation of popular drama series Lovers in Paris. It was premiered at the D-Cube Arts Center in April 2012, starring Lee Ji-hoon and Jung Sang-yeon as Han Ki-joo, Bang Jin-wi and Oh So-yeon as Kang Tae-young, and Lee Hyun, Jung Woo-soo and Run as Yoon Soo-hyuk.

Kim also worked on a musical adaptation of the Japanese manga series Shin'ya Shokudō (深夜食堂; lit. "Midnight Diner") by Yarō Abe. The manga is about a late-night diner that is open from midnight to dawn and its quirky patrons. The series was already adapted into a Japanese drama in 2009. The musical adaptation of Midnight Diner was initially a canceled project, but Kim, along with lyricist-writer Jeong Young and composer Kim Hye-seong, decided to continue working on it. Park Yong-ho, the CEO of Musical Heaven, helped acquire the rights to perform the musical from Japan. With support from Doosan Art Center, a reading performance was held in February 2012.

Hong Ki-yu, CEO of Eukdo Co., Ltd, showed interest in producing the musical. Midnight Diner was performed at Dongsung Hall in Daehak-ro, Seoul starting February 17, 2013. The production was by Eukdo Co., Ltd, with investments from M Venture Investment and Interpark INT. Japanese manga publisher Shogakukan and stage designer Masako Ito collaborated on the production. The musical won the Innovation Award at the 3rd Yegreen Awards held at Chungmu Art Hall in Jung-gu, Seoul.

In the end of 2012, Kim became mentor of Chungmu Art Hall 'The 1st Musical House Black and Blue' (제1회 뮤지컬하우스 블랙 앤 블루).

=== Director of licensed musical and 10th debut anniversary ===
Kim first attempt in directing a license musical was in 2013 South Korean adaptation of Gutenberg! The Musical! written by Scott Brown and Anthony King. In this two-man musical spoof, a pair of aspiring playwrights Bud and Doug, perform a backers' audition for their new, hilariously ill-advised project – a big, splashy musical about printing press inventor Johannes Gutenberg. South Korean version of musical Gutenberg was premiered in Medium Theater Black of Chungmu Art Center in August 2013.

It was followed by another license musical Carmen. Written by Norman Allen, lyrics by Jack Murphy, and music by Frank Wildhorn, it is based on the novella of the same name. Carmen premiered in October 2008 at the Karlín Musical Theater in Prague Czech. The musical Carmen is a work that combines splendid performances such as magic, acrobatics and circus. Hue Park was lyricist for South Korean adaptation and Kim's experience in magic show was one of the reason he was chosen for this work.

On March 5, 2013, the play Fantasy Fairy Tale was back on stage to celebrate the 10th anniversary of the performance. It performed until May 2013 Art One Theater Hall 3. Kim also applied to Korea Center for Performing Arts 2013 3rd Exhibition Hall Competition. His proposal won, as result Fantasy Fairy Tale was selected part of 2013 Korea Performing Arts Center Excellent Repertoire Series and can perform in Grand Theater of Daehangno Arts Theater with 504 seats. Choreographer Song Hee-jin, who took on the role of Marie at the time of the premiere was in charge of the choreography. Actors who appeared in the premiere in 2003, Oh Yong, Choi Yo-han, Choi Dae-hoon, Lee Gap-sun, Lee Hyeon-bae, also joined.

=== Collaboration with The Best Play ===
==== The Pride ====
Kim's first collaboration with The Best Play (Note: Yeongeukjeon Co., Ltd. is a specialized corporation established in November 2007 for the systematic operation of Theatrical Jeoljeon based on the performance of Theatrical Yoljeon in 2004 to revitalize Korean theater. Every two years since 2008, The Theater of the Stars 2, new plays are performed with an annual lineup, and repertoire performances are performed in years other than this season. Theatrical Enthusiasm Co., Ltd. provides high-quality works to the audience through 'discovery of the repertoire of Korean plays', 'support for domestic creative works', 'development of verified overseas works', and 'active exchange with overseas productions' to provide the audience with the fun and charm of plays. I want to share with more people.) was at their 5th festival, where he directed the Korean premiere of "The Pride" by Greek-British author Alexi Kaye Campbell. The Pride originally debuted in November 2008 at the Royal Court Theatre Upstairs, earning Campbell the Critics' Circle Prize for Most Promising Playwright, the John Whiting Award for Best New Play, and the Laurence Olivier Award for Outstanding Achievement in an affiliate theatre.

The play contrasts scenes from the restrictive 1950s with those from the more liberated, yet still imperfect, present day. In the past, there is a complex emotional triangle involving Philip, a real estate agent married to Sylvia, who finds himself drawn to Oliver, a writer whose books Sylvia is illustrating. In the present setting, the same character names are used, but the individuals are different: the modern Oliver is a freelance journalist jeopardizing his relationship with Philip due to his addiction to anonymous sexual encounters, seeking comfort from his friend Sylvia.

The South Korean adaptation of the play was written by Ji Yi-seon and translated by Kim Soo-bin. It premiered at the Art One Theater in 2014 with Lee Myeong-haeng and Jung Sang-yoon double-cast as Philip, and Oh Jong-hyuk and Park Eun-seok playing the role of Oliver. Kim So-jin and Kim Ji-hyun portrayed Sylvia, while Choi Dae-hoon and Kim Jong-goo were double-cast as Peter.

Kim also directed the encore performances of The Pride. In 2015, It was performed at Suhyeon Theater in Daehak-ro. Bae Soo-bin and Kang Pil-seok were cast as Philip, Jeong Dong-hwa and Park Sung-hoon as Oliver, and Lim Kang-hee and Lee Jin-hee as Sylvia. Lee Won and Yang Seung-ri alternated in the role of Doctor/Man/Peter.

In the third season of The Pride in 2017, Lee Myeong-haeng and Jung Sang-yoon reprised their roles as Philip, joined by Bae Soo-bin and Seong Doo-seop. Oh Jong-hyuk, Jeong Dong-hwa, and Park Seong-hoon returned as Oliver, with Jang-yul joining the cast. Sylvia was portrayed by Kim Ji-hyun (season 1), Lee Jin-hee and Lim Kang-hee (Season 2).

The fourth performance of The Pride in 2019 featured Kim Joo-hun and Kim Kyung-soo as Philip, Lee Jung-hyuk and Lee Hyun-wook as Oliver, and Son Ji-yoon and Shin Jeong-won as Sylvia. The production took place at Art One Theater 2, Daehak-ro.

==== Hamlet the Play ====
In 2016, Kim joined the 6th Best Play Festival and directed the third work, "Hamlet - The Play," to honor the 400th anniversary of Shakespeare's death. This adaptation was based on Kim's previous directorial and written work, "Hamlet - The Story of a Sad Clown." The play debuted in 2001 as a university production, with Kim Kang-woo in the lead role of Hamlet. In this performance, Kim Kang-woo returned to play Hamlet in a professional stage production, sharing the role with Kim Dong-won. The play delves into the loneliness and inner struggles of Hamlet. It stays true to Shakespeare's original work but adds new characters like young Hamlet and the clown Yorick to delve deeper into Hamlet's isolation and the importance of embracing life. Playwright Ji Yi-seon worked with Kim to craft this fresh adaptation, which ran from August 2 to October 16, 2016, at the Chungmu Arts Center's Black Theater.

==== M Butterfly ====
In 2017, Kim directed the third encore of The Best Play's repertoire, David Henry Hwang's play, "M. Butterfly." He took over from Kim Kwang-bo, who helmed the premiere in the 3rd Best Play Festival in 2012 and the encore in 2014.

"M. Butterfly" is a play that combines Puccini's opera, "Madame Butterfly," with the true story of a 1986 French diplomatic leak incident. Playwright Henry Hwang was inspired by a chance conversation in 1985 about a French diplomat, Bernard Briscott, who fell in love with a Chinese actress who turned out to be a man. The play follows French diplomat René Gallimard as he reflects on his life in a Paris prison in 1986. Through flashbacks, the story alternates between his time in Beijing and Paris, with Gallimard identifying himself as Pinkerton and Song Li-ling as the female protagonist, Chu Cho-sang, from opera "Madame Butterfly."

It opens on September 9 at Art One Theater 1 in Daehakro, Seoul, and runs until December 3. Kim Joo-heon and Kim Do-bin play René Gallimard, Jang Yul and Oh Seung-hoon play Song Liling, Seo Min-seong and Kwon Jae-won play Toulon, Song Young-sook plays Chin-Suzuki, Hwang Man-ik and Kim Dong-hyun play Marc, Kim Yu-jin plays Helga, and Kang Da-yoon plays Renée.

==== King Speech ====
In 2021, Kim joined the 8th Best Play Festival and directed the fifth lineup. He helmed the Korean premiere of the play "The King's Speech" by David Seidler, adapted from the 2010 film of the same name. The play won Best Picture, Best Director, Best Screenplay, and Best Actor at the 83rd Academy Awards and was premiered as a play in the UK in 2012. The story revolves around King Bertie (King George VI), who struggled with a stuttering speech impediment and his relationship with Lionel, a speech therapist. The play explores the friendship between two individuals from different social classes and delves into themes of overcoming personal limitations and true leadership.

The Korean version of the play was adapted by playwright Ji Yi-seon and translated by Park Young-rok. It was performed at Art One Theater Hall 2 from November 28 to February 7, 2021. The stage design was done by Lee Eun-kyung, lighting design by Kim Gwang-seop, music design by Chae Han-ul, costume design by Hong Moon-ki, prop design by Noh Ju-yeon, makeup design by Han Sae-rom, stage direction by Park Gi-ppeum, and graphic design by Lee Jong-gyu. Seo Hyun-cheol and Park Yoon-hee played the role of Lionel, while Park Jeong-bu and Cho Sung-yoon were double cast as King George VI. Other cast members included Lee Seon-joo as Myrtle, Yang Seo-min as Elisabeth, Won-jo Won-jo as David and Cosmo Lang, and Myeong-kyung Choi as Winston Churchill and King George V.

==== Inside William ====
In 2020, Kim served as the dramaturg for the original musical "Inside William," the first original musical of The Best Play. This musical was Second collaboration between Kim Han-sol and composer Kim Chi-young, known for their work on the musical "Letters for You." "Inside William" was selected in the creative musical category of the Korea Arts Council's '2020 Performing Arts Creation Center's New Work of the Year'. It premiered in 2021 on March 2 at Daehakro Art One Theater. Originally scheduled to run until April 11, the show's popularity led to an extension until April 25. The production was directed by Park Ji-hye, with the script and lyrics by Kim Han-sol and composition and music direction by Kim Chi-young. The cast included Choi Ho-joong, Kim A-young, Yuria, Han Jae-ah, Kim Bada, Lim Jun-hyuk, Joo Min-jin, and Choi Seok-jin.

The musical "Inside William" had a showcase in London, England in 2022. It was selected for the 'K-Musical Roadshow in London', which was a part of the 2022 K-Musical Overseas Platform Showcase Project hosted by the Arts Management Support Center. On November 21, 2022, a highlight showcase was held at the Gatsby Mansion in London's West End, featuring local British actors and staff.

"Inside William" also had a replica performance in Shanghai, China from 2022 to 2023. This production was produced by 'Shanghai Culture Square', a reputable production company that has consistently produced Chinese versions of excellent Korean original musicals. The performance took place at the Shanghai Commercial Theater from December 24, 2022, to January 1, 2023, under the Chinese title <莎翁乐园>. Director Kim Dong-yeon and choreographer Song Hee-jin directly led the local Chinese actors and staff in Shanghai, China, and the production received favorable reviews from local media as the best gift at the beginning of the year.

During this process, the script was revised, and the actors' ideas were incorporated during reenactment practice in 2023. The core idea of the script revolves around the question "What if Hamlet, Romeo, and Juliet meet each other after coming out of the play?" This concept originated from the author's visit to Shakespeare's birthplace. The performance reflects the author's consistent warmth in observing the characters.

It is returning for a second performance two years after encore, directed by Kim Dong-yeon, with the script and lyrics by Kim Han-sol, composition and music direction by Kim Chi-young, at Art One Theater Hall 1 from September 12 to December 3, 2023.

==== Touching the Void ====
In 2022, Kim helmed the third work of 9th Best Play Festival. He directed the South Korean premiere of the David Greig play Touching the Void, based on the 1988 book of the same name by Joe Simpson. The book was previously adapted into a docudrama survival film in 2003. It was adapted for the stage by David Greig,

Touching the Void is a play featuring four characters: Joe Simpson, Simon Yates, Sara Simpson, and Richard. The story is based on the real-life events of the 1985 Siula Grande expedition by mountaineers Joe Simpson and Simon Yates. The play depicts their challenging journey after Simpson breaks his leg during their descent and Yates makes the difficult decision to cut the rope, assuming Simpson had perished. Against all odds, Simpson manages to survive and find his way back to base camp. Shin Sung-min, Kim Seon-ho, and Lee Hwi-jong shared the role of Joe Simpson. Oh Jeong-taek and Jeong-hwan were double cast as Simon Yates. Lee Jin-hee and Son Ji-yoon played Jo's older sister, Sara Simpson. Jo Hoon and Jeong Ji-woo appeared as Richard, the manager of the Siula Grande expedition base camp.

After reading the script, I had no idea how to express it. But the written lines and stories came. It is a work that gives me a strong will to say, ‘I really want to tell this story to the audience living in this era. I think I was most worried about how much I could give the audience to imagine. There were limits to concretely implementing this (mountain). Making this feel synesthetic! It could be sound, it could be the feeling of light, and there are many ways to imagine on this stage... Rather than expressing it specifically, I express this story in a way that stimulates the imagination, and “I tried to make the stage simple so that I could focus more on the psychology of the characters, the situations they were in, and the emotions they wanted to express there.

The play premiered on July 8, 2022, at the Art One Theater 2 in Daehangno, and ran until September 29, 2022. The production was presented by The Best Play and sponsored by the Seoul Foundation for Arts and Culture and Porsche Korea. The play was based on the original work by Joe Simpson, adapted for the stage by David Greig and translated by Kim Seung-wan. The creative team included Park Sang-bong (set), Choi Bo-yun (lighting), Kwon Ji-hwi (sound), Kim Kyeong-yuk (music), Hong Moon-gi (costume), Rho Joo-yeon (props), and Kang Hyeon-ho as the stage manager.

=== Maybe Happy Ending ===
In September 2015, Kim worked with Hue Park and Will Aronson on a try-out production of their new musical, “Maybe Happy Ending,” in Seeya Studio at Wooran Foundation. The musical was premiered by DaeMyoung Culture Factory in December 2016. In its premiere show, 70 out of 97 performances sold out. The show won 6 Korean Musical Awards, including Best Director. The English-language version of "Maybe Happy Ending" was awarded the 2017 Richard Rodgers Award by the American Academy of Arts and Letters. A new Korean production opened in 2018.

== As playwright ==
=== Original work ===
- Hamlet - the story of a sad clown (햄릿 - 슬픈 광대 이야기) —2001
- Fantasy Fairy Tale (환상동화) — 2003

=== Play adaptation ===
- 2019 — Musical Cyrano (시라노) with Kim Soo-bin
- 2010 — Play Human (인간)
- 2012 — Musical First Store of Coffee Prince with Jung Min-ah
- 2009 — Musical My First Time (마이 퍼스트 타임)
- 2007 — Play Doctor Irabu (닥터 이라부)

== Stage ==
=== As assistant director ===
Assistant director in musical production
Year	Title		Director	Theater	Date	Ref.
Year	English	Korean	Director	Theater	Date	Ref.
2009	Notre-Dame de Paris	노트르담 드 파리	Gilles Maheu and Wayne Fox	National Theater of Korea Haneulnuri Theater	August 1–27, 2009	
2009	Notre-Dame de Paris	노트르담 드 파리	Gilles Maheu and Wayne Fox	Seongnam Arts Center Opera House	September 1–12, 2009	
2012	Lovers in Paris	파리의 연인	Gustavo Zajac	D-Cube Link Art Center	April 5, 2012 - May 28, 2012	
2014-2015	Kinky Boots	킹키부츠	Jerry Mitchell	Chungmu Art Center Main Theater	December 2, 2014 - February 22, 2015	

=== As director ===
Director in musical production
Year	Title		Role	Theater	Date	Ref.
Year	English	Korean	Role	Theater	Date	Ref.
2007-2013	Finding Kim Jongwook	김종욱 찾기	Director	JTN Art Hall 1	October 23, 2007 - February 17, 2013	
2008	White Proposal	화이트 프로포즈	Director	Family Theater Vision Hall	March 27, 2008 - April 26, 2008	
2008	White Proposal	화이트 프로포즈	Director	Family Theater Vision Hall	April 5–Aug 31	
2009	My First Time	마이 퍼스트 타임	Director	JTN Art Hall 3	January 3, 2009 - May 10, 2009	
2009	Finding Kim Jongwook	김종욱 찾기	Director	Daegu Bongsan Culture Center Main Hall (Gaon Hall)	January 14, 2009 - February 15, 2009	
2009	Mother Promise	엄마의 약속		Place Daehak-ro Star City Tiny Alice (Art Hall Marika Building 2)	October 1 – December 31	
2012	Coffee Prince 1st Shop	커피프린스 1호점	Director	TOM Theater 1	February 24, 2012 - April 29, 2012	
2012-2013	Midnight Diner	심야식당	Director	Dongseon Arts Center Dongseon Hall	December 11, 2012 - February 17, 2013	
2013	Finding Kim Jongwook - Gunpo	김종욱 찾기 - 군포	Director	Gunpo Cultural Arts Center Chireugkhol (Small Theater)	February 14, 2013 - February 16, 2013	
2013-2014	Carmen	카르멘	Director	LG Art Center	December 3, 2013 - February 23, 2014	
2014	Gutenberg	구텐베르크	Director	Yes 24 Stage 3	Sep 17–Dec 7	
2014-2015	Midnight Diner	심야식당	Director	Daehak-ro Musical Center Middle Theater	November 16, 2014 - January 18, 2015	
2015	School Oz	스쿨오즈	Director, Playwright	SMTOWN THEATRE	January 14, 2015 - December 31, 2016	
2015	Dwarfs	난쟁이들	Director	Chungmu Art Center Black Box	February 27, 2015 - April 26, 2015	
2015	Pungwolju	풍월주	Director	Venue Petitzel Theater	Sep 8–Nov 22	
2016	Dwarfs	난쟁이들	Director	TOM Theater 1	January 26, 2016 - June 26, 2016	
2016–2017	Gutenberg	구텐베르크	Director	Chungmu Art Center Medium Theater Black	Nov 13–Jan 22	
2016-2017	Maybe Happy Ending	어쩌면 해피엔딩	Director	Yes24 Stage 2	December 20, 2016 - March 5, 2017	
2017	Maybe Happy Ending	어쩌면 해피엔딩	Director	Yes24 Stage 2	October 23, 2017 - November 12, 2017	
2017-2018	Dwarfs	난쟁이들	Director	TOM Theater 1	November 26, 2017 - February 11, 2018	
2018	Along with the Gods: The Last 49 Days	신과 함께_저승편	Director	Seoul Arts Center CJ Towol Theater	March 27, 2018 - April 15, 2018	
2018	Along with the Gods: The Last 49 Days - Ansan	신과 함께_저승편 - 안산	Director	Ansan Culture & Arts Center Haedoji Theater	April 27, 2018 - April 29, 2018	
2018	Infinite Power	무한동력	Director	Chungmu Art Center Middle Theater Black	April 24, 2018 - July 1, 2018	
2018	Shinheung Military Academy	신흥무관학교	Director	National Museum of Korea Theater Yong	September 9, 2018 - September 22, 2018	
2018	Shinheung Military Academy	신흥무관학교	Director	Seongnam Arts Center Opera House	October 6, 2018 - October 7, 2018	
2018	Shinheung Military Academy	신흥무관학교	Director	Andong Culture & Arts Center Ungbu Hall	October 12, 2018 - October 14, 2018	
2018	Shinheung Military Academy	신흥무관학교	Director	Mokpo Citizen Culture & Sports Center Grand Theater	October 26, 2018 - October 28, 2018	
2018	Shinheung Military Academy - Jeonju	신흥무관학교	Director	Jeonbuk National University Samsung Cultural Hall	November 9, 2018 - November 11, 2018	
2018	Shinheung Military Academy - Ulsan	신흥무관학교 - 울산	Director	Ulsan Hyundai Art Center Grand Theater	November 16, 2018 - November 18, 2018	
2018	Shinheung Military Academy - Daejeon	신흥무관학교 - 대전	Director	Daejeon Arts Center Art Hall	November 30, 2018 - December 2, 2018	
2018	Shinheung Military Academy - Busan	신흥무관학교 - 부산	Director	Busan Cultural Center Grand Theater	December 14, 2018 - December 16, 2018	
2018	A Gentleman's Guide to Love and Murder	젠틀맨스 가이드	Director	Hongik University Daehakro Art Center Main Theater	November 9, 2018 - January 27, 2019	
2018	Maybe Happy Ending	어쩌면 해피엔딩	Director	Yes24 Stage 1	November 13, 2018 - February 10, 2019	
2018	Vampire Arthur	뱀파이어 아더	Director	Chungmu Art Center Middle Theater Black	November 30, 2018 - February 10, 2019	
2018	Shinheung Military Academy - Ansan	신흥무관학교 - 안산	Director	Ansan Culture & Arts Center Haedoji Theater	December 21, 2018 - December 23, 2018	
2018	Shinheung Military Academy - Suwon	신흥무관학교 - 수원	Director	Gyeonggi Arts Center Grand Theater	December 29, 2018 - December 30, 2018	
2018–2019	Vampire Arthur	뱀파이어 아더	Director	Chungmu Art Center Medium Theater Black	Nov 30–Feb 10	
2019	Shinheung Military Academy - Daegu	신흥무관학교 - 대구	Director	Keimyung Art Center	January 4 - January 6	
2019	A Gentleman's Guide to Love and Murder	젠틀맨스 가이드 - 부산	Director	Sogang Theater Shinhan Card Hall, Busan	February 15 - February 17	
2019	Shinheung Military Academy	신흥무관학교	Director	Kwanglim Art Center BBCH Hall	February 27 - April 21	
2019	A Gentleman's Guide to Love and Murder	젠틀맨스 가이드 - 수원	Director	SK Artrium Main Theater, Suwon	March 1 - March 3	
2019	Shinheung Military Academy - Gwangju	신흥무관학교 - 광주	Director	Gwangju Arts Center Main Theater	May 4 - May 5	
2019	Shinheung Military Academy - Chuncheon	신흥무관학교 - 춘천	Director	Baengnyeong Art Center, Kangwon National University (formerly Baengnyeong Culture Center)	May 31 - June 1	
2019	Cyrano	시라노	Director	BBCH Hall of Gwanglim Art Center	Aug 10–Oct 13	
2019	Return	귀환	Director	Olympic Park, Woori Finance Art Hall	October 22 - December 1	
2019-2020	Fantasy Fairy Tale	환상동화	Director	Cottonhall, Dongduk Women's University Performing Arts Center	December 21 - March 1	
2020	Via Air Mail	비아 에어 메일	Director	Daehakro Arts Theater Small Theater	March 7, 2020 - March 15, 2020	
2020	Maybe Happy Ending	어쩌면 해피엔딩	Director	Yes24 Stage 1	June 30, 2020 - September 13, 2020	
2020	Sideureus	시데레우스	Director	Art One Theater Hall 1	Aug 12–Oct 25	
2020	Sideureus	시데레우스	Director	Yes 24 Stage 1	Oct 31–Nov 29	
2020–2021	A Gentleman's Guide to Love and Murder	젠틀맨스 가이드: 사랑과 살인편	Director	Concert Hall Hongik University Daehangno Art Center Grand Theater	Nov 20–March 1	
2021	Inside William	인사이드 윌리엄	Dramaturg	Art One Theater 1	March 2, 2021 - April 25, 2021	
2021	Who's Living in the Kuroi Mansion?	쿠로이 저택엔 누가 살고 있을까	Director	Plus Theater (formerly Culture Space N)	February 18, 2021 - March 21, 2021	
2021	The Great Comet	그레이트 코멧	Director	Universal Art Center	March 20, 2021 - May 30, 2021	
2021	Maybe Happy Ending	어쩌면 해피엔딩	Director	Yes 24 Stage 1	June 22, 2021 - September 5, 2021	
2021–2022	A Gentleman's Guide to Love and Murder	젠틀맨스 가이드: 사랑과 살인편	Director	BBCH Hall at the Gwanglim Art Center	Nov 13–Feb 20	
2021-2022	Who's Living in the Kuroi Mansion?	쿠로이 저택엔 누가 살고 있을까	Director	Plus Theater (formerly Culture Space N)	November 18, 2021 - January 9, 2022	
2022	Dwarfs	난쟁이들	Director	Plus Theater (formerly Culture Space N)	January 25, 2022 - April 10, 2022	
2022	Death Note	데스노트	Director	Chungmu Art Center Main Theater	April 1, 2022 - June 19, 2022	
2022	Hourglass	모래시계	Director	D Cube Art Center	May 26–Aug 14	
2022	Death Note	데스노트	Director	Opera House, Seoul Arts Center	July 1, 2022 - August 14, 2022	
2022	Mrs. Doubtfire	미세스 다웃파이어	Director	Seongnam Arts Center, Shallotte Theater	August 30, 2022 - November 8, 2022	
2023	Death Note	데스노트	Director	Charlotte Theater	March 28, 2023 - June 18, 2023	
2023	Along with the Gods: The Two Worlds	신과 함께_저승편	Director	CJ Towol Theatre, Seoul Arts Center	April 15, 2023 - April 30, 2023	
2023	Death Note	데스노트	Director	Keimyung Art Center, Daegu	June 30, 2023 - July 16, 2023	
2023	Death Note	데스노트	Director	Busan Citizens' Hall Main Theater	July 26, 2023 - August 6, 2023	

=== Theatre ===
Theater directing credits
Year	Title		Theater	Date	Ref.
Year	English	Korean	Theater	Date	Ref.
2006	Der Kontrabaß	콘트라베이스	Woori Theater in Daehakro	February 7 to March 5	
2006	70 Minutes of Romance “He & She” 1st Performance	70분간의 연애 － He＆She	Happy Theater	Dec 20, 2006 - Mar 4, 2007	
2007	70 Minutes of Romance “He & She” Busan Performance	70분간의 연애 － He＆She	Busan Gamagol Small Theater	March 8 - April 1	
2007	Fantasy Fairy Tale	환상동화	TOM Theater 2	April 5, 2007 - July 1, 2007	
2007	70 Minutes of Love “He & She” Encore Second Performance	70분간의 연애 － He＆She	Daehangno Sangsang Art Hall White (Sangsang White Small Theater)	April 19 - July 22, 2007	
2007	70 Minutes of Romance “He & She” 2nd Busan Performance	70분간의 연애 － He＆She	Busan Gamagol Small Theater	Dec 8-31	
2007-2008	Dr. Irabu	닥터 이라부	Daehangno Sangsang Art Hall White (Sangsang White Theater)	October 18, 2007 - January 13, 2008	
2008	70 Minutes of Love “He & She” Encore 3rd Performance	70분간의 연애 － He＆She	Daehangno Sangsang Art Hall White (Sangsang White Theater)	Jan 18 - March	
2008	70 Minutes of Love “He & She” Encore 4th Performance	70분간의 연애 － He＆She	Daehangno Sangsang Art Hall White (Sangsang White Theater)	March 12 - June 8	
2008	Dr. Irabu	닥터 이라부	Hoam Stage	March 14, 2008 - March 1, 2009	
2008	White Proposal	화이트 프로포즈	Family Theater Vision Hall	March 27, 2008 - April 26, 2008	
2008	70 Minutes of Romance “He & She” Daegu performance	70분간의 연애 － He＆She	Daegu Culture and Arts Theater CT	June 11 - July 6	
2008	Dr. Irabu	닥터 이라부	Cultural Art Theater CT	July 10, 2008 - August 3, 2008	
2008	70 Minutes of Love - Busan	70분간의 연애 - 부산	Old BNK Busan Bank Joheun Theater 2	July 11, 2008 - July 27, 2008	
2008	70 Minutes of Love - Busan	70분간의 연애 - 부산	Busan Gamagol Small Theater	July 9–27	
2008-2009	Fantasy Fairy Tale	환상동화	TOM Theater Company Daehangno	April 5, 2008 - August 31, 2008	
2009	My First Time	마이 퍼스트 타임	JTN Art Hall 3	January 3, 2009 - May 10, 2009	
2009	Hamlet - Sad Clown Story	햄릿 - 슬픈 광대 이야기	TOM Theater 2	January 27, 2009 - January 31, 2009	
2009	Finding Kim Jongwook	김종욱 찾기	Daegu Bongsan Culture Center Main Hall (Gaon Hall)	January 14, 2009 - February 15, 2009	
2009	Dr. Irabu	닥터 이라부	Cultural Art Theater CT	March 19, 2009 - April 12, 2009	
2009	Fantasy Fairy Tale - Busan	환상동화 - 부산	Old BNK Busan Bank Joheun Theater 2	September 25, 2009 - October 25, 2009	
2009-2010	70 Minutes of Love - He & She	70분간의 연애－He＆She	Daehangno Sangsang Art Hall White (Sangsang White Theater)	October 6, 2009 - March 14, 2010	
2009-2010	70 Minutes of Love	70분간의 연애	Culture and Art Exclusive Theater CT	December 4, 2009 - January 3, 2010	
2010	70 Minutes of Love - He & She	70분간의 연애－He＆She	Chungmu Art Center Small Theater Blue	July 3, 2010 - August 29, 2010	
2010	Human	인간	Chungmu Art Center Small Theater Blue	July 3, 2010 - August 29, 2010	
2012	Lovers in Paris	파리의 연인	D-Cube Link Art Center	April 5, 2012 - May 28, 2012	
2013	Finding Kim Jongwook - Gunpo	김종욱 찾기 - 군포	Gunpo Cultural Arts Center Chireugkhol (Small Theater)	February 14, 2013 - February 16, 2013	
2013	Fantasy Fairy Tale	환상동화	Art One Theater 3	March 1, 2013 - May 26, 2013	
2013–2014	Fantasy Fairy Tale	환상동화	Art Theater Main Theater	December 6, 2013 - December 15, 2013	
2014	Drama Series 5 - Pride	연극열전5 - 프라이드	Art One Theater 2	August 16, 2014 - November 9, 2014	
2015	Speaking in Tongues	스피킹 인 텅스	Yes24 Stage 3	May 1, 2015 - July 19, 2015	
2017	M.Butterfly	M.Butterfly	Art One Theater 1	September 9, 2017 - December 3, 2017	
2018	R & J	알 앤 제이	Lee Hae-rang Theater	July 10, 2018 - September 30, 2018	
2019	Pride	프라이드	Art One Theater 2	May 25 - August 25	
2019	R & J	알 앤 제이	Lee Hae-rang Theater	June 28 - September 29	
2019	Return	귀환	Olympic Park, Woori Finance Art Hall	October 22 - December 1	
2019-2020	Fantasy Fairy Tale	환상동화	Cottonhall, Dongduk Women's University Performing Arts Center	December 21 - March 1	
2020–2021	Theater Series 8 - The King's Speech	연극열전8 - 킹스 스피치	Art One Theater 2	November 28, 2020 - February 7, 2021	
2020–2021	Fantasy Fairy Tale	환상동화	Dongduk Women's University Performing Arts Center, Cotton Hall	December 29, 2020 - March 1, 2021	
2021	Inside William	인사이드 윌리엄	Art One Theater 1	March 2, 2021 - April 25, 2021	
2021	R&J	알 앤 제이	Lee Hae-rang Theater	February 5, 2021 - May 2, 2021	
2021–2022	Fantasy Fairy Tale	환상동화	National Theater of Korea, Dalloreumi Theater	December 12, 2021 - February 12, 2022	
2022	Touching the Void	터칭 더 보이드	Art One Theater 2	July 8, 2022 - September 18, 2022	

== Awards and nominations ==
Name of the award ceremony, year presented, category, nominee of the award, work, and the result of the nomination
Award ceremony	Year	Work	Category	Result	Ref.
7th Korea Musical Awards	2023	Death Note	Best Director	Won	
7th Korea Musical Awards	2023	Death Note	Best Musical Over 400 Seats	Won	
6th Korea Musical Awards	2022	Great Comet	Daesang	Nominated	
6th Korea Musical Awards	2022	Great Comet	Best Musical Over 400 Seats	Nominated	
6th Korea Musical Awards	2022	Great Comet	Best Director	Nominated	
6th Korea Musical Awards	2022	Who Lives in Kuroi's Mansion?	Daesang	Nominated	
6th Korea Musical Awards	2022	Who Lives in Kuroi's Mansion?	Best Musical Under 400 Seats	Won	
6th Korea Musical Awards	2022	Who Lives in Kuroi's Mansion?	Best Director	Nominated	
8th E-Daily Culture Awards	2021	Maybe a Happy Ending	Grand Prize	Won	
5th Korea Musical Awards	2021	Sideureus	Best Musical Under 400 Seats	Nominated	
5th Korea Musical Awards	2021	Who Lives in Kuroi's Mansion?	Best Director	Nominated	
4th Korea Musical Awards	2020	Cyrano	Best Musical over 400 Seats	Nominated	
4th Korea Musical Awards	2020	Cyrano	Best Director	Nominated	
4th Korea Musical Awards	2020	Sideureus	Best Musical Under 400 Seats	Nominated	
3rd Korea Musical Awards	2019	Shinheung Military Academy	Daesang	Nominated	
3rd Korea Musical Awards	2019	Gentleman's Guide: Love and Murder	Best Musical Big Theatre	Nominated	
3rd Korea Musical Awards	2019	Gentleman's Guide: Love and Murder	Best Director	Nominated	
2nd Korea Musical Awards	2018	Maybe a Happy Ending	Musical of The Year	Won	
2nd Korea Musical Awards	2018	Maybe a Happy Ending	Best Director	Won	
6th Yegreen Musical Award	2018	Maybe a Happy Ending	Best Director	Won	
2018 Asia Culture Awards	2018	Shakespeare R&J	Best Drama	Won	
3rd Yegreen Musical Award	2013	Dwarf	Innovation Award	Won	
2nd Yegreen Musical Award	2013	Midnight Diner	Innovation Award	Won	
The 7th Miryang Summer Performing Arts Festival	2007	Fantasy Fairy Tale	Young Director's Home Directing Award	Won	
