= San Martín, Buenos Aires =

San Martín
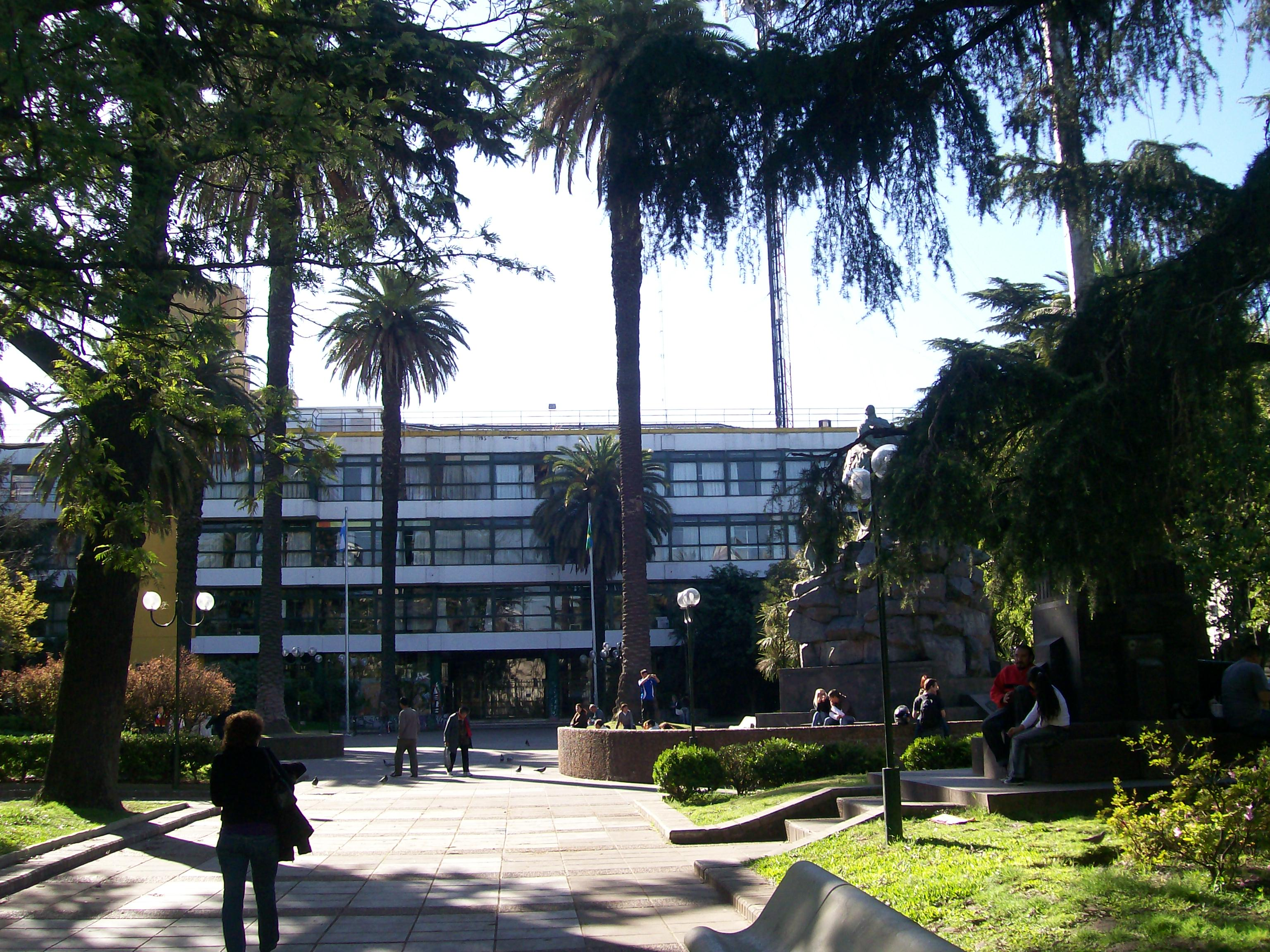
- San Martín Town Square

- Location in Greater Buenos Aires
- Coordinates: 34°34′S 58°32′W
- Country: Argentina
- Province: Buenos Aires
- Partido: General San Martín
- Elevation: 28 m (92 ft)

Population (2001 census [INDEC])
  - Total: 28,339
- CPA Base: B 1650
- Area code: +54 11

Ciudad del Libertador General Don José de San Martín, more commonly known as San Martín, is the administrative seat of General San Martín Partido in the urban agglomeration of Greater Buenos Aires.

== Geography ==
The area is heavily urbanised and is home to numerous food processing industries, as well as to a large Peugeot-Citroën auto factory. The city is bordered to the north-east by the autonomous city of Buenos Aires.

== Sport ==
The town is home to the Chacarita Juniors football club, champions of Argentina in Metropolitano 1969.

== Famous residents ==
- Enzo Fernández, footballer and 2022 FIFA World Cup champion
- Oscar Alfredo Gálvez, racing driver
- José Hernández, writer
- Alberto Martín, actor
- Marianela Núñez, ballet dancer
- Roberto De Vicenzo, golfer

== Images ==
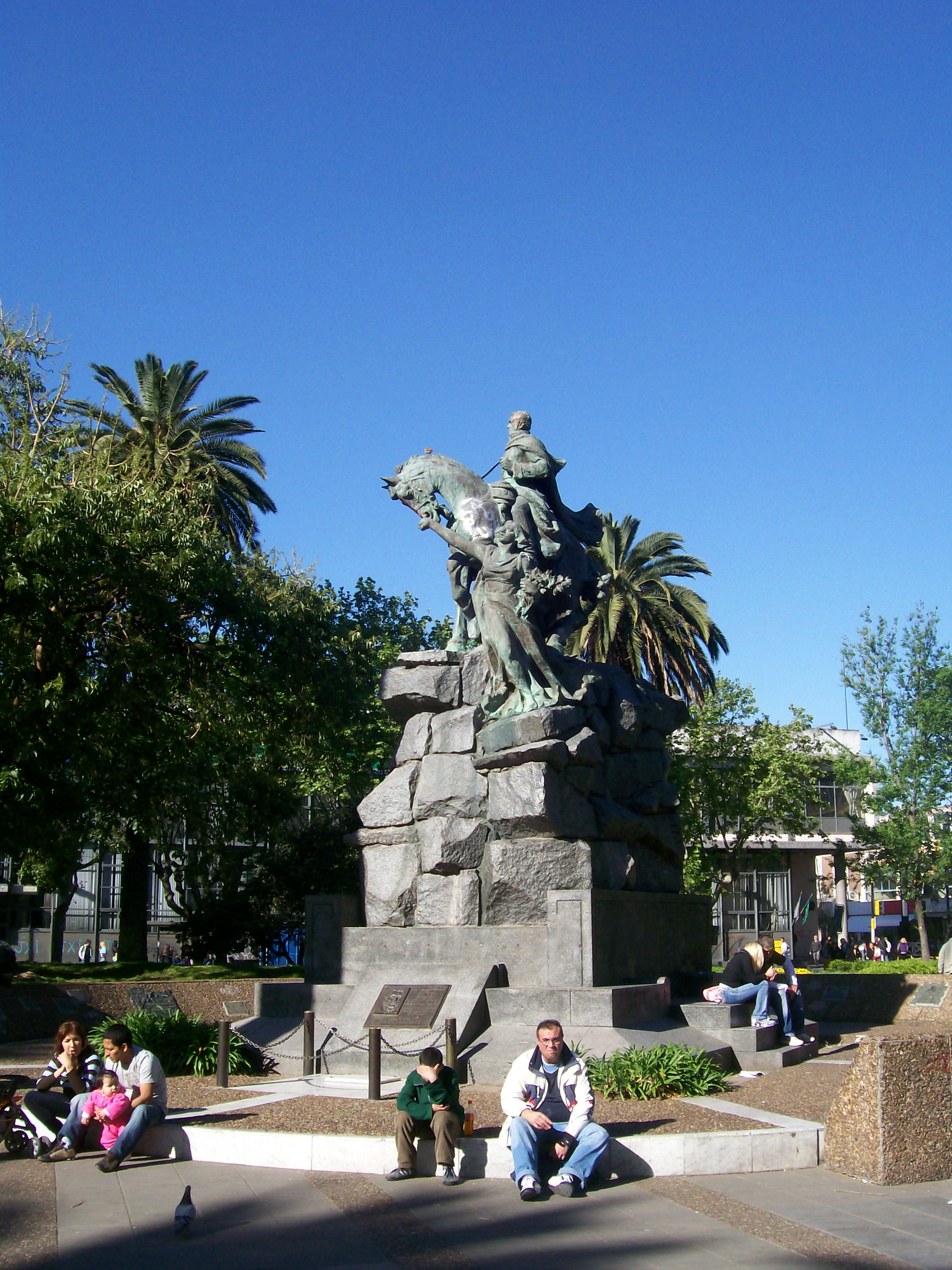
Monument to General José de San Martín

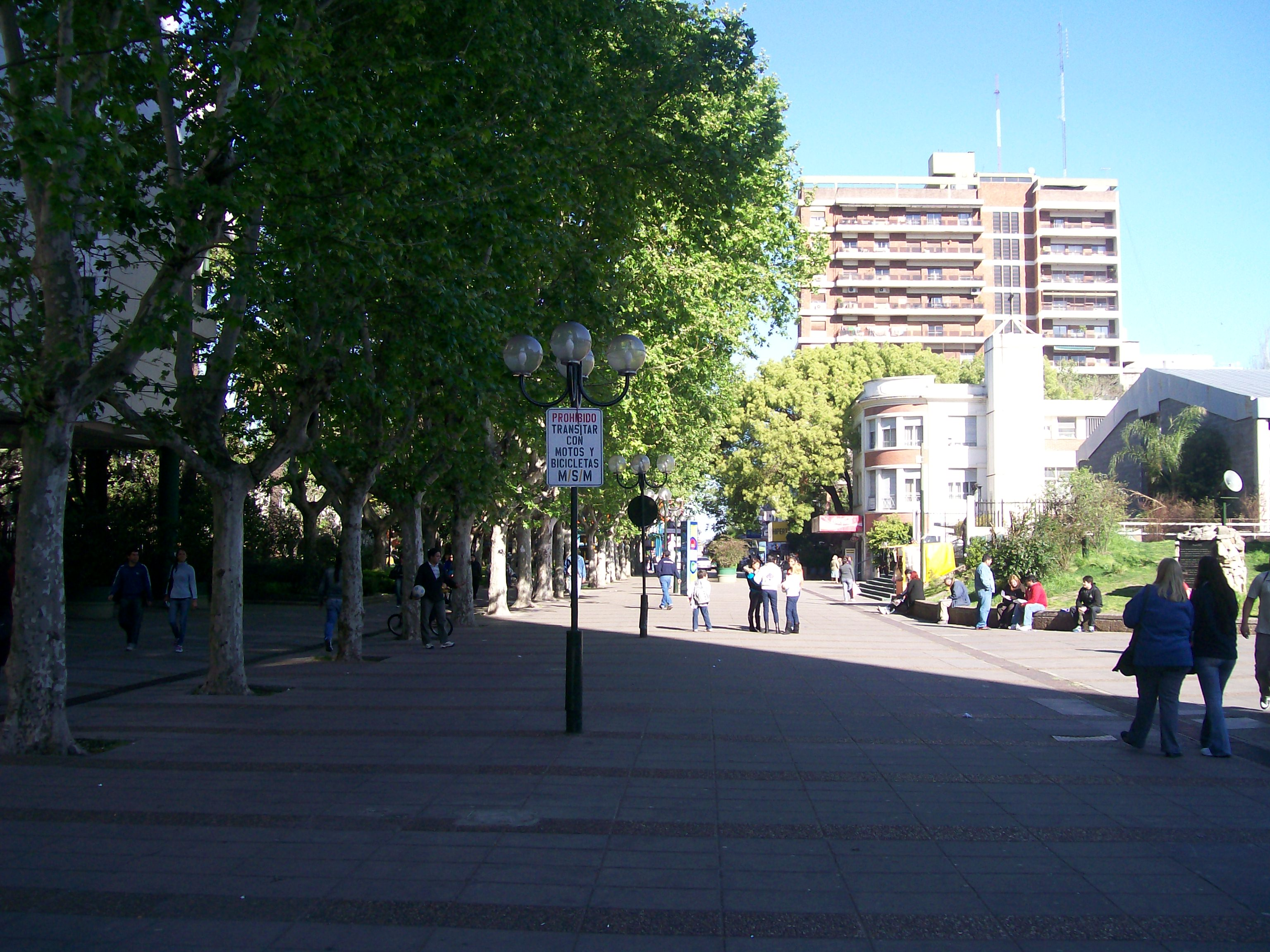
Belgrano Street

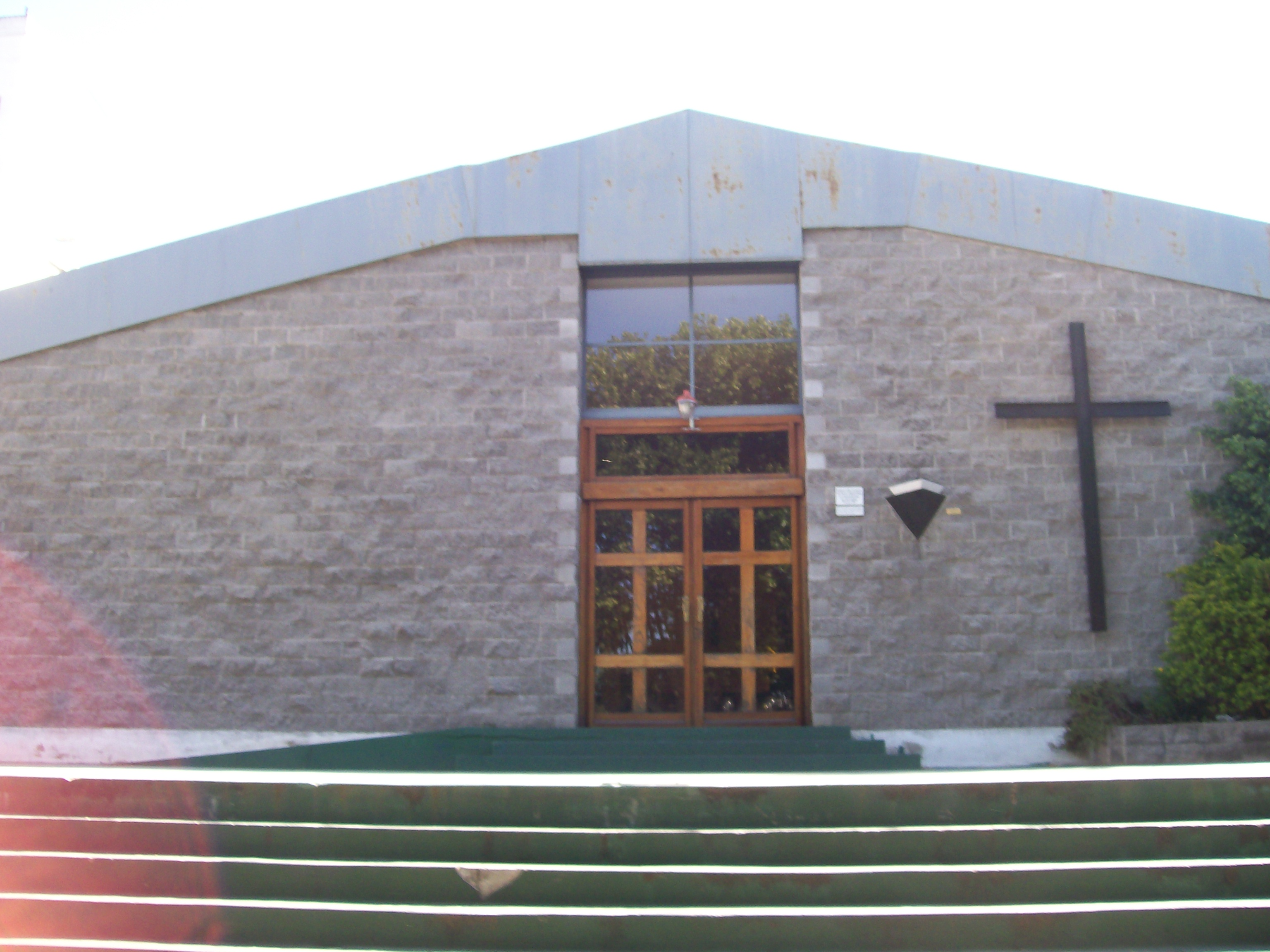
Cathedral

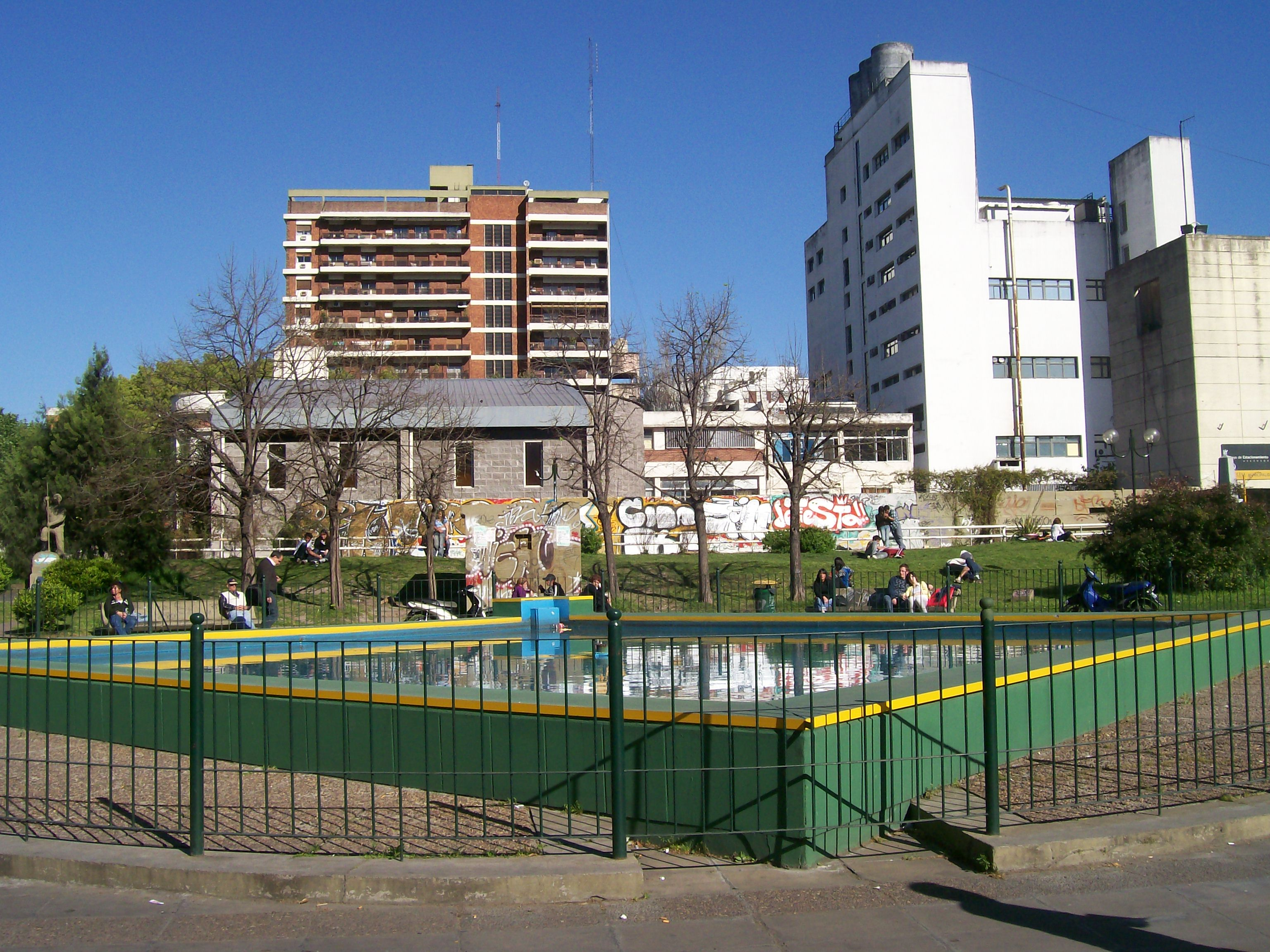
San Martín Plaza

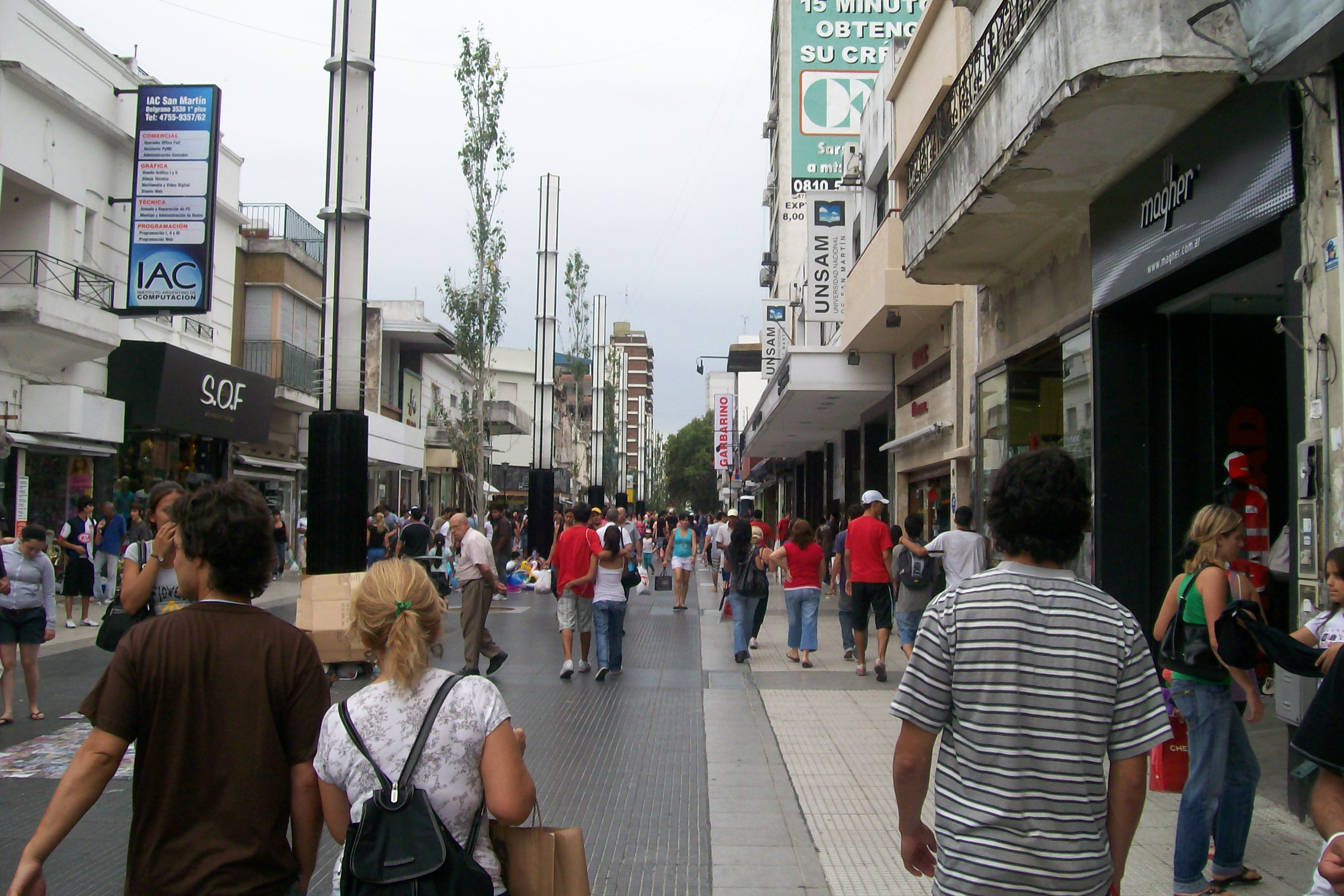
Belgrano Street - commercial area

== See also ==
- List of twin towns and sister cities in Argentina
