= Felicitas (film) =

- Directed by: María Teresa Costantini
- Screenplay by: Graciela Maglie; Sabrina Farji; Felix Augusto; Quadros Teresa Correa Avila
- Produced by: Margarita Gómez
- Starring: Sabrina Garciarena
- Cinematography: Lula Carvalho
- Edited by: Laura Bua
- Music by: Nico Muhly
- Production company: Buenos Aires Producciones S.A.
- Release date: 11 June 2009
- Running time: 128 minutes
- Country: Argentina
- Language: Spanish

Felicitas is a 2009 Argentine romantic drama film directed by María Teresa Costantini.

== Plot ==
The story is set in Buenos Aires in 1862. Felicitas Guerrero, a young and beautiful girl, is deeply in love with Enrique Ocampo. Despite her family's objections, they maintain a joyful relationship. Despite her father's knowledge of Felicitas' love for Enrique, he compels her to marry Don Martín De Álzaga, a man much older and wealthier than her. In response, Enrique decides to enlist in the army and leave for the war against Paraguay, uncertain of the duration. Felicitas' attempts to convince her parents against the forced marriage prove fruitless, and she reluctantly complies.

A year after her marriage, Felicitas gives birth to their only child, Félix de Álzaga. Tragedy strikes in 1869 as Félix succumbs to the yellow fever epidemic. Devastated by her son's death and further compounded by the passing of Don Martín a year later, Felicitas, now 26 and affluent, finds herself courted by various suitors. Among them is Samuel Sáenz Valiente, her estate's neighboring young man, whom she met during a stormy night when he offered help with her stalled cart.

However, the situation becomes complicated with Enrique's return from the war. He seeks out Felicitas, unaware of her budding relationship with Samuel. Upon discovering her engagement plans to Samuel, jealousy fuels his actions. He intercepts Felicitas and takes her to her late husband's study. There, he proposes that they escape to a distant place together, an offer Felicitas declines. She leaves the study, and Enrique later finds her again and forcibly takes her away.

A short while later, Felicitas' cousin Manuela and her mother Felisa inquire about her whereabouts at the gathering. It is revealed that Felicitas and Enrique are at the lagoon. The guests rush there, armed with revolvers. In a tense moment, Enrique points his gun at Felicitas' neck without intending to harm her, commanding others to lower their weapons. Tragically, Enrique's gun discharges accidentally, causing Felicitas to fall.

Enrique, witnessing Felicitas' demise, takes his own life by shooting himself in the head. Felicitas clings to life for a brief moment after the fatal shot. In those fleeting seconds, she presses herself against Enrique, departing from the world together. In death, they hope to find eternal love in the heavens.

== Cast ==
- Sabrina Garciarena as Felicitas
- Gonzalo Heredia as Enrique Ocampo
- Alejandro Awada as Carlos Guerrero
- Ana Celentano as Felisa Guerrero
- Nicolas Mateo as Cristian De Maria
- Antonella Costa as Manuela
- Luis Brandoni as Martín de Alzaga
- Carlos Rivkin as George
