= María Carámbula =

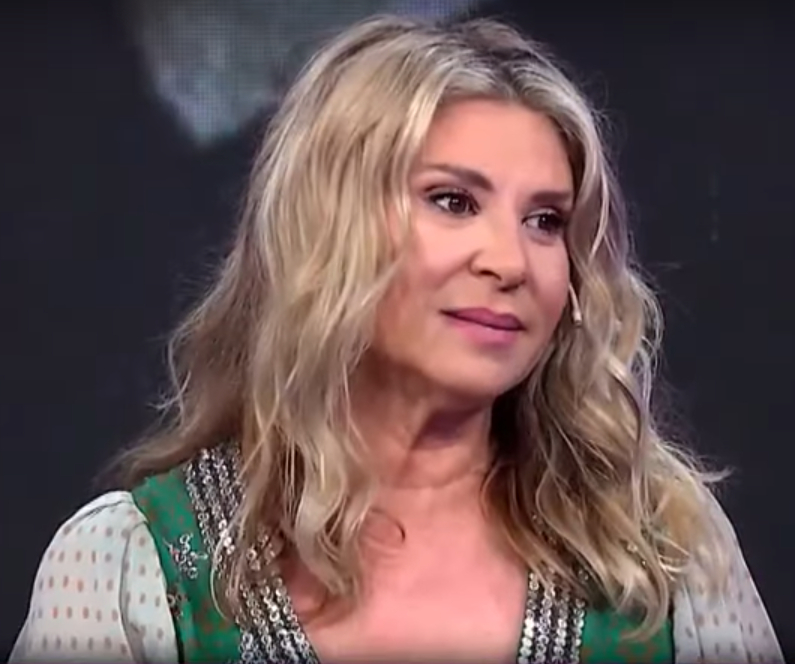
- María Carambula (2023)
- Born: 31 October 1968 (age 57); Montevideo, Uruguay
- Occupation: Actress
- Years active: 1989-present

María Carámbula (born 31 October 1968) is a Uruguayan actress. She appeared in more than twenty films since 1989.

== Selected filmography ==
TV
Year	Title	Role	Notes
2011	El elegido	Lucía Giuliani	
2006	Chiquititas sin fin	Julia Anzorena de Demont	
2004	Culpable de este Amor	Lorena Villaalba	
