= Terra ribelle =

- Starring: Anna Favella; Rodrigo Guirao Diaz; Sabrina Garciarena
- Countries of origin: Italy; Argentina
- Original language: Italian
- No. of seasons: 2
- No. of episodes: 15

Terra ribelle is a TV series in 2010 and 2012 on Rai 1. The series follows the evolution of the intricate relationship between the two childhood friends Andrea and Iacopo, and two noble sisters decayed, Elena and Luisa, against the backdrop of intrigue and stories of common life of the Tuscan Maremma in the nineteenth century (although the fiction was filmed in Argentina).

== Production ==
The drama, produced by Rai Fiction and Albatross Entertainment, is composed of a total of 15 episodes of 100 minutes each, the first of which debuted on Sunday 17 October 2010 in prime time on Rai 1.

On 21 October 2012, the fiction back in prime time on Rai 1, with the second season, set in the early '900, tell through the evolution of the love story of Andrea and Elena, the emigration of many Italians, especially Maremma, to South America.

The project combines the director Cinzia TH Torrini and screenwriter Peter Exacoustos after the success of the series Elisa di Rivombrosa.

== Cast and characters ==
=== Main cast ===
- Anna Favella as Elena
- Rodrigo Guirao Diaz as Andrea
- Sabrina Garciarena as Luisa
- Fabrizio Bucci as Iacopo (season 1)
- Ivan Gonzalez as Iacopo (season 2)
- Humberto Zurita as Lupo
- Luz Cipriota as Isabella (season 2)
- Belen Leiva as Giulia (season 2)
- Giulia Elettra Gorietti as Zifolo (season 2)
- Lando Buzzanca as Alfredo Malagridas (season 2)

== Criticism ==
Aldo Grasso pointed out that the series seems to "repeat Elisa di Rivombrosa", and called it "an exemplary feuilleton ', as with the four characteristics that have made the literature of the nineteenth century appendix:

- the oleography, that is a setting that the viewer feels to belong to the past;
- clichés, such as good versus evil, which is personified in the various characters;
- the redemption, or the final victory of good over evil, despite all the difficulties;
- the agnition, that the revelations and twists on the identity of the characters.

== See also ==
- List of Italian television series
