= Los hijos de López =

- Directed by: Enrique Dawi
- Release date: 1980
- Running time: 90 minute
- Country: Argentina
- Language: Spanish

Los hijos de López is an Argentine film shot in Eastmancolor, directed by Enrique Dawi based on his own screenplay, written in collaboration with Hugo Moser's script. It was released on June 5, 1980, and starred Alberto Martín, Cristina del Valle, Dorys del Valle, Emilio Disi, Carlos Calvo, and Tincho Zabala.

== Synopsis ==
The film explores the relationships between a businessman and a Japanese company, as well as his eldest son's interactions with women.

== Cast ==
- Alberto Martín...Martín López Lawrence
- Cristina del Valle...Cristina Figueroa Harding
- Dorys del Valle...Srta Berutti
- Emilio Disi...Emilio López
- Carlos Calvo...Gerardo López
- Tincho Zabala...Martín López
- Santiago Bal...Repetto
- Jorge Barreiro...Jorge
- Alejandra da Passano...Alejandra Estigarribia
- Silvia Pérez...Silvia
- Miguel Jordan...Miguel
- Elena Sedova...Perla
- Moria Casán...Cameo
- Carlos Monzón...Cameo
- Guillermo Brizuela Méndez...Negro
- Augusto Larreta...El Tata Figueroa Harding
- Carlos Moreno...Bazterrica
- Sakemoto...Sakemoto
- Naanim Timoyko...Marcela
- Arturo Bonín...Arturo
- Horacio Taicher...Barman del Tata Figueroa Harding.
- Haydeé Suárez
- Enzo Bai

== Reception ==
Raúl Álvarez Pontiroli in Convicción wrote: "For a healthy and idiotic family."

GM in La Prensa expressed: "The narrative... if in some passages its rhythm declines, it is due to momentary lacks of imaginative irrigation in the original book."

Roberto Gil in Clarín said: "The impact of the gags diminishes... due to some interior scenes... but Moser's cleverness... and the director's professionalism... manage to overcome these weaknesses."

Manrupe and Portela write: "Another successful television program turned into a film below what is considered correct."
