= Mr. America (film) =

- Directed by: Leonardo Ferrari Carissimi
- Written by: Leonardo Ferrari Carissimi; Fabio Morgan
- Produced by: Velvet Movie; Azteca Produzioni; Redigital
- Starring: Anna Favella; Marco Cocci
- Cinematography: Antonio Scappatura
- Music by: The Niro
- Distributed by: Stemo Production
- Release date: November 7, 2013
- Running time: 93 minutes
- Countries: Italy; Canada
- Languages: English; Italian

Mr. America is a 2013 Italian thriller directed by Leonardo Ferrari Carissimi, and screenplay by the director himself and Fabio Morgan. It stars Anna Favella and Marco Cocci.

== Plot ==
Penny Morningstar is a young and successful art gallery director, while Adrian is a failed artist, obsessed with Andy Warhol. According to Adrian, Warhol was a serial killer, without piety, who stole people's soul, letting them die slowly. He thinks that Valerie Solanas, Edie Sedgwick or Jean-Michel Basquiat would probably share this theory, but they cannot do it, because they are all dead. These are not the only suicides connected to the controversial figure of Andy Warhol, or as David Solanas called him, "Mr. America". As for Penny, every artist of the gallery is in love with her but she wishes that she could destroy them. But then comes a real killer, who thinks he is Andy Warhol and kills all the artists who are part of Penny Morningstar's "Factory".

== Cast ==
- Anna Favella as Penelope (Penny) Morningstar
- Marco Cocci as Adrian
- Eliud Luciani as Nathan Briac
- Luca Mannocci as Seven
- Michael Schermi as Roy

== Premiere ==
The film premiered on October 17, 2013, in Trento and the press conference and other official premiere was in Rome, on November 5, 2013. The movie has been released in all the cinemas on November 7, 2013.

=== Accolades ===
Year	Ceremony	Award	Result
2013	Terra di Siena International Film Festival	Best Actor - Marco Cocci	Won

== Reception ==
A review on MYmovies. praised the sound effects and disturbing atmosphere "The film seduces the spectator with a visually evocative style, but it suffers from a certain coldness", wrote A. Rodio for Movieplayer.it. Another review stated that the film was "partially penalized by the not always convincing acting and by the risk that the theatrical background of its author risks being felt a little too much on more than one occasion, but [that], thanks to the careful photography by Antonio Scappatura, [it] boast[ed] decidedly elegant images and demonstrate[d] the not inconsiderable merit of leading to a far from banal epilogue... albeit not the easiest to understand."
