= Culpable de este Amor =

- Created by: Daniel Delbene; Oscar Ibarra
- Directed by: Federico Palazzo; Gabriel De Ciancio; Omar Aiello
- Starring: Juan Darthés; Gianella Neyra; Raúl Taibo
- Opening theme: Culpable by Guadalupe Álvarez Luchia
- Country of origin: Argentina
- Original language: Spanish
- No. of episodes: 205

Production
- Producer: Rodolfo Stoessel
- Production location: Argentina
- Running time: 60 minutes

Original release
- Network: Telefe
- Release: 12 January – 2 November 2004

Related
- Kachorra; Amor en custodia

Culpable de este Amor (Guilty of this Love) is an Argentine telenovela produced and broadcast by Telefe in 2004.

== Cast ==
- Agustín Rivero – Juan Darthés
- Laura Cazenave – Gianella Neyra
- Marcos Soler – Raúl Taibo
- Fernando Salazar – Mauricio Dayub
- Virginia Marvin – Gloria Carrá
- Román Machado – Rafael Ferro
- Julia Rodríguez de Soler – Silvia Kutika
- Pablo Casenave – Mariano Bertolini
- Víctor Musad – Ramiro Blas
- Lorena Villaalba – María Carámbula
- Soledad – Catalina Artusi
- Alejo (Nicolás García) – Darío Lopilato
- Vilma Zapata – Noemí Frenkel
- Diana Segovia – Magela Zanotta
- Gabriela Sánchez – Leonora Balcarce
- Gastón Rivero – José María Monje
- Clara Salcedo – Julieta Novarro
- Verónica Iglesias – Sabrina Garciarena
- Luciana – Manuela Pal
- Gustavo Ludueña – Marcelo Melingo
- Roberta Soldati – Lucrecia Capello
- Jimena – Bettina O'Connell
- Sandra Quiñones – Silvina Acosta
- Sarita – Loren Acuña
- Doctor Robledo – Eduardo Lemos
- Labarde – Sergio Bermejo
- Amalia Bruzzi – Malena Figo
- Miguel Bruzzi – Daniel Orlando García
- Néstor Gómez – Manuel Novoa
- Lucio Andrade – Patricio Pepe
- Celso Azor – Guido d'Albo
- Guillermo 'Willy' López – Maxi Zago
- Lic. Chávez – Jorge Alberto Gómez
- Doctor Polack – Carlos Rivkin
- Policial Morales – Daniel Campomenosi
- Pamela Díaz (Marcela Aguirre de Machado) – Verónica Ponieman
- Doctor Jiménez – Marcelo Breit
- Teodoro – Guillermo Marcos
- Greta – Beatriz Thiabaudin
- Herminia – Cristina Fridman
- Gladys – Paola Messina
- Martín Rizzo – Martín Borisenko
- Adrián Salazar – Pompeyo Audivert
- Lic. Aberasturi – Daniel Lemes
- Lic. Héctor Eduardo – Fernando Sureda
- Silvia Lagos – Rita Terranova
- Macedo – Daniel de Vita
- Bazán – Claudio Torres
- Esteban – Fabio Aste
- Andrés Ligero – Fabián Pizzorno
- Olga Zamudio – Mónica Villa
- Galloso – Pia Uribelarrea
- Sasha – Julieta Zylberberg
- Padre Arnaldo – Juan Carlos Puppo
- Padre Javier – Jorge Gómez
- Franco Galván – Adrián Navarro
