= Necrofobia =

- Directed by: Daniel de la Vega
- Screenplay by: Nicanor Loreti; Germán Val Daniel de la Vega
- Produced by: Daniel de la Vega; Néstor Sánchez Sotelo
- Starring: Luis Machín; Raúl Taibo; Viviana Saccone; Gerardo Romano; Julieta Cardinali; Hugo Astar
- Cinematography: Mariano Suárez
- Edited by: Martín Blousson; Daniel de la Vega; Guille Gatti
- Music by: Claudio Simonetti
- Production companies: Del Toro Films; Furia Films; Getterson; Instituto Nacional de Cine y Artes Audiovisuales (INCAA); Piromania FX; Primer Plano Film Group
- Distributed by: Primer Plano Film Group; Del Toro Films
- Release date: 8 April 2014 (Argentina)
- Running time: 75 minutes
- Country: Argentina
- Language: Spanish
- Box office: $82,995

Necrofobia is a 2014 Argentine horror thriller film directed by Daniel de la Vega. It stars Luis Machín, Raúl Taibo, Viviana Saccone, Gerardo Romano and Julieta Cardinali.

== Plot ==
Dante is a tailor whose innate fear to death becomes phobia when his twin brother dies. From that point on Dante's mental stability starts to crumble, while a series of mysterious deaths in his family for what he is accused of will lead him to fight for proving his innocence.
