= Anna Favella =

Italian stage, television and movie actress

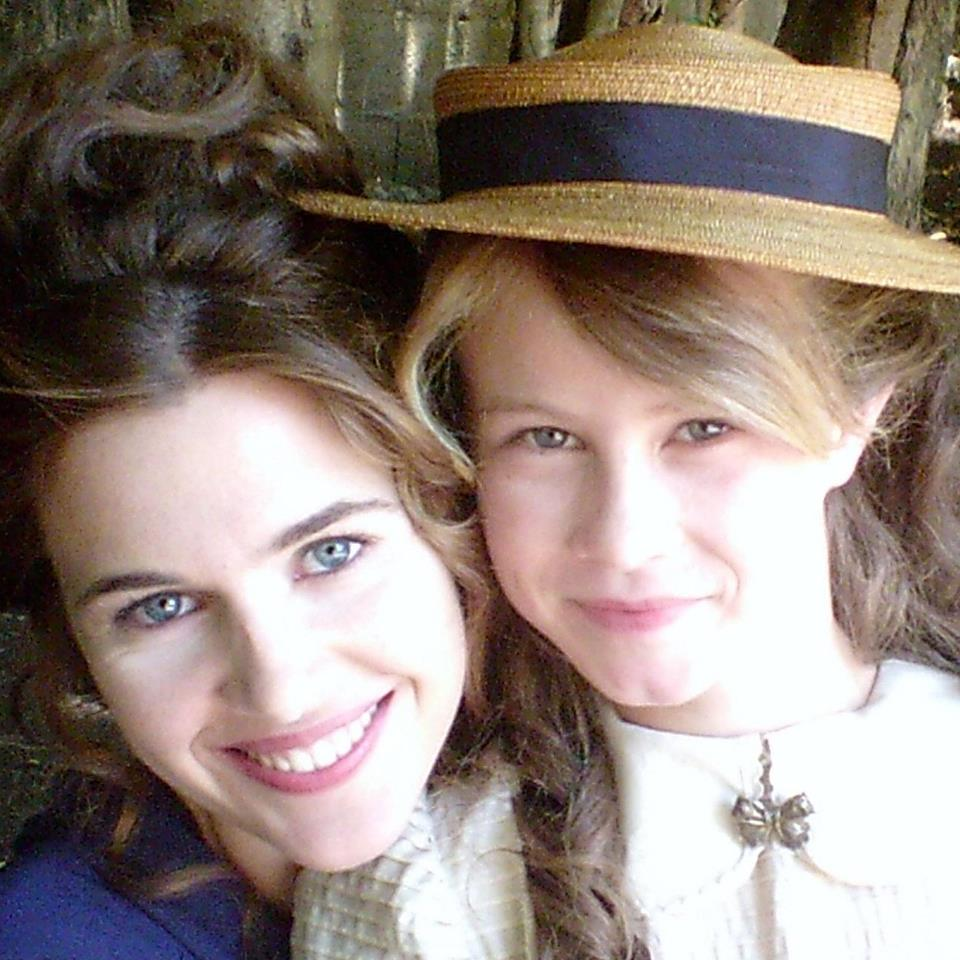
- Belen Leiva and Anna Favella, 2013
- Born: 21 September 1983 (age 42); Rome, Lazio, Italy
- Occupation: Actress
- Known for: Terra ribelle Mr. America (film); Luis Miguel: The Series

Anna Favella (born September 21, 1983) is an Italian stage, television and movie actress. She is best known for her role as Elena Marsili in the TV series Terra Ribelle, directed by Cinzia TH Torrini, and Terra Ribelle – Il nuovo mondo, directed by Ambrogio Lo Giudice.

== TV ==
=== TV series ===
- Framed! A Sicilian Murder Mystery, Netflix (2022-)
- Luis Miguel: The Series, Netflix, Telemundo (2018–2021)
- Le tre rose di Eva 4, directed by Raffaele Mertes - Canale 5 (2017)
- Il bello delle donne... alcuni anni dopo, directed by Eros Puglielli - Canale 5 (2016)
- Un medico in famiglia 10, directed by Elisabetta Marchetti - Rai Uno (2016)
- Non è stato mio figlio, directed by Alessio Inturri and Luigi Parisi - Canale 5 (2015)
- Centovetrine - Canale 5 (2014–2015)
- Terra ribelle - Il Nuovo Mondo, directed by Ambrogio Lo Giudice - Rai Uno (2012)
- Terra ribelle, directed by Cinzia TH Torrini - Rai Uno (2010)
- Don Matteo 7, directed by Giulio Base - Rai Uno (2009)
- Enrico Mattei - L'uomo che guardava al futuro, directed by Giorgio Capitani - Rai Uno (2008)

== Theatre ==
- Walking on the Moon by Leonardo Ferrari Carissimi
- Hitchcock - A love story by Leonardo Ferrari Carissimi
- Tutti i padri vogliono far morire i loro figli by Leonardo Ferrari Carissimi
- Love - L'amore ai tempi della ragione permanente by Leonardo Ferrari Carissimi
- Cashmere WA by L. Staglianò, directed by M. Panici
- Delitto Pasolini - Una considerazione inattuale by Leonardo Ferrari Carissimi
- Being Hamlet - La Genesi by Leonardo Ferrari Carissimi
- La terra desolata by Thomas Eliot
- Due dozzine di rose scarlatte by Aldo De Benedetti
- Il gobbo by S. Mrozek
- Ti amo... da morire by F. Draghetti e R. Stocchi
- Amianto - Paura di avere paura by Leonardo Ferrari Carissimi
- Tutti i colori della notte by A. Lauritano
- Il medico dei pazzi by Eduardo Scarpetta
- Blu Note Bar by Stefano Benni
- Sarto per signora by Georges Feydeau

== Filmography ==
| Year | Title | Role | Notes |
|---|---|---|---|
| 2008 | Enrico Mattei - L'uomo che guardava al futuro | Priscilla Leoni | Miniseries |
| 2009 | Don Matteo | Lisa | Episode: "L'Anniversario" |
| 2010–2012 | Terra ribelle | Princess Elena Giardini | Main role; 15 episodes |
| 2013 | Mr. America | Penelope | Feature film debut |
| 2014–2016 | CentoVetrine | Alba Boneschi | Main role (season 15); 192 episodes |
| 2016 | Non è stato mio figlio | Rebecca Mari | Main role; 8 episodes |
| 2016 | Un medico in famiglia | Celeste Di Maio | Main role (season 10); 25 episodes |
| 2017 | Il bello delle donne... alcuni anni dopo | Donata Carnevale | Episode: "Delia Di Cioccio" |
| 2017–2018 | Le tre rose di Eva | Cristina Rontal | Recurring role (season 4); 10 episodes |
| 2018–2021 | Luis Miguel: The Series | Marcela Basteri | Main role; 14 episodes (seasons 1, 3) |
