= Alberto Martín (actor) =

Argentine actor (1944–2025)

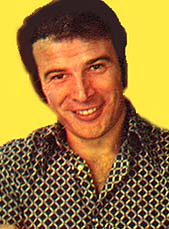
- Martín in 1979
- Born: Luis Alberto Di Feo; 8 May 1944; San Martín, Argentina
- Died: 16 August 2025 (aged 81)
- Occupation: Actor
- Years active: 1969–2020

Luis Alberto Di Feo (8 May 1944 – 16 August 2025), better known as Alberto Martín, was an Argentine actor.

== Life and career ==
Di Feo was born in San Martín, Argentina on 8 May 1944.

Throughout his career, he acted in a number of feature films, including Brigada en acción (1977), Los hijos de López (1980), My Family's Beautiful! (1980), as well as television shows including Amas de casa desesperadas.

Martín died on 16 August 2025, at the age of 81.
