= Juan Darthés =

Brazilian actor

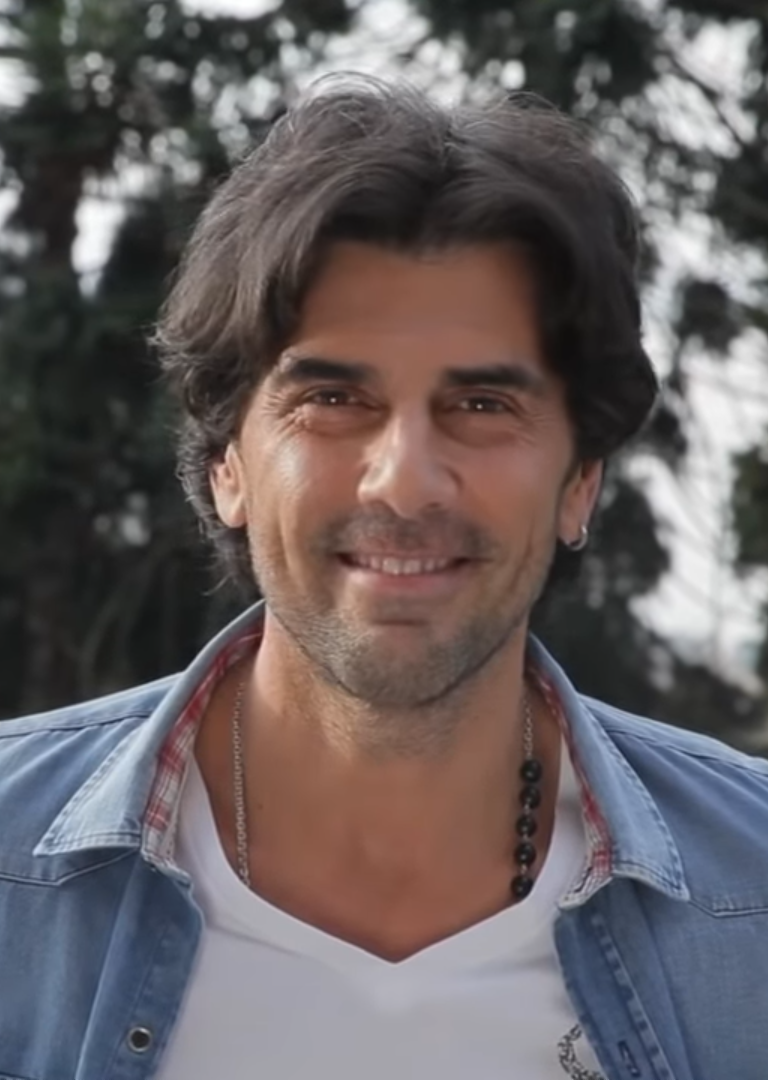
- Darthés in 2014
- Born: Juan Rafael Pacífico Dabul; October 28, 1964 (age 61); São Paulo, Brazil
- Occupations: Actor, singer
- Years active: 1984–2018

Juan Rafael Pacífico Dabul (born 28 October 1964), known as Juan Darthés, is a Argentinean-Brazilian former actor and singer who spent most of his life and professional career in Argentina.

== Biography ==
Juan Darthés was born as Juan Rafael Pacífico Dabul in São Paulo, Brazil, on October 28, 1964. He is the son of the actress Leyla Dartel (pseudonym of Leyla Dabul) and the tango singer Oscar Fuentes (pseudonym of Juan Pacífico) (1930–2014). He started his acting career in the eighties. His initial telenovelas were produced by Channel 9. He moved to Channel 13 in 1998, to work in Gasoleros, which made him famous. He has also worked in the teen drama Patito Feo. As Dulce Amor proved to be a huge success Telefe hired most of the cast for a new telenovela, Camino al amor, whose designated couples were composed by the same actors, such as Darthés and Sol Estevanéz. Los ricos no piden permiso featured a love triangle between the characters of Darthés, Araceli González and Luciano Castro.

He also started a career as a Tango music singer in later years.

=== Sexual misconduct conviction ===
Several women that have worked close with the actor have publicly accused Juan Darthés of sexual misconduct. The first one of them was Calu Rivero, who accused him of sexual harassment during the filming of Dulce amor. Darthés in turn filed a suit against Rivero, accusing her of defamation, although Darthés then failed show up to the first court hearing in December 2018. Rivero's accusations were followed by the actresses Natalia Juncos and Ana Coacci, who denounced similar actions during the filming of Gasoleros back in 1999. Darthés also accused them of defamation.

In December 2018, the actress Thelma Fardin, who was also part of the cast of Patito Feo, accused that Darthés raped her when he was 45 and she was 16. The event would have taken place in a hotel in Nicaragua, when the cast was making an international tour for the Patito Feo CD. She announced it during a press conference, joined by a statement signed by several Argentine actresses. Darthés denies all of these sexual misconduct accusations.

On June 11 of 2024, the Brazilian judiciary found actor Juan Darthés guilty and sentenced him to six years in prison for raping actress Thelma Fardin when she was a minor. Amnesty International announced that the Brazilian court made this determination in a second-instance ruling, following an appeal of the initial court's decision, which had acquitted the actor.

== Works ==
=== Television ===
- la Viuda Blanca (1984)
- Sólo un hombre (1985–1986)
- Pasiones (1988)
- Una voz en el teléfono (1990–1991)
- La elegida (1992)
- El Precio del Poder (1992)
- Marco, el Candidato (1994)
- Por siempre mujercitas (1995–1996)
- Los Hermanos Pérez Conde (1997)
- Los herederos del poder (1997)
- Te quiero, te quiero (1998)
- Gasoleros (1998–1999)
- Primicias (2000)
- Ilusiones Compartidas (2000–2001)
- 099 Central (2002)
- Soy Gitano (2003)
- Culpable de este amor (2004)
- Se dice amor (2005–2006)
- Patito Feo (2007–2008)
- Dulce Amor (2012–2013)
- Camino al amor (2014)
- Los ricos no piden permiso (2016)
- Simona (2018)

=== Discography ===
- 1998: Soledades (Epsa Music)
- 2000: A unos ojos
- 2004: Así (Sony Music Entertainment)
- 2007: Patito Feo
- 2008: Patito Feo: la vida es una fiesta
- 2009: Promesas de amor (Epsa Music)
- 2010: Arráncame la vida
- 2012: Canciones de amor y novelas
- 2014: Ahora (Warner Music)

== Awards ==
- 2011 Martín Fierro Awards: Best tango music program (for La esquina del Abasto)
- 2015 Martín Fierro Awards: Best tango music program (for La esquina del Abasto)
- 2016 Martín Fierro Awards: Best lead actor of daily fiction (for Los ricos no piden permiso)

=== Nominations ===
- 2002 Martín Fierro Awards: Best secondary actor (for 099 Central)
- 2003 Martín Fierro Awards: Best lead actor of telenovela (for Soy Gitano)
- 2004 Martín Fierro Awards: Best lead actor of telenovela (for Culpable de este amor)
- 2013 Martín Fierro Awards
  - Best actor of daily drama (for Dulce Amor)
  - Best tango music program (for Lo mejor de la esquina)
