= Raúl Taibo =

Argentine actor

- Born: Raúl Jorge Tignanelli Mascaró; January 17, 1954 (age 71); Buenos Aires, Argentina
- Other names: Raúl Taibo
- Occupation: Actor
- Years active: 1971-Present
- Spouse: Marcela Ortiz (m. 1992; div. 1992)
- Partner(s): María Elena Coppola González; Pía Meritello; Mercedes
- Children: Antonella Tignanelli (b. 1987); Francesca Tignanelli (b. 2016)
- Parent: Beatriz Taibo
- Relatives: Marcelo Taibo (Brother)

Raúl Jorge Tignanelli Mascaró (born 17 January 1954 in Buenos Aires, Argentina), known as Raúl Taibo is an Argentine actor, whose work has been mainly in television. In 1973 he played a title role in Hipólito y Evita and in 2014 starred in Necrofobia. He is best known for his role as Lautaro Lamas in the 1990-1 telenovela Una voz en el teléfono.

== Filmography ==
=== Television ===
- 1971 "La Familia Duerme en Casa", Canal 9.
- 1972 "Que Vida de Locos", Canal 9.
- 1974 "Dos a quererse", Canal 13.
- 1975 "Piel naranja", Canal 13. Terna Revelación del Año Martín Fierro.
- 1975 "Lo Mejor de Nuestra Vida Nuestros Hijos...", Canal 9.
- 1975 "Teatro Como en el Teatro", Canal 11.
- 1975 "Teatro de Humor", Canal 9.
- 1975 "Viernes de Pacheco", Canal 9.
- 1976 "Alta comedia", Canal 9.
- 1977 "Tiempo de Vivir", Canal 13.
- 1979 "Andrea Celeste", ATC.
- 1980 "Señorita Andrea", ATC.
- 1982 "Laura mía", ATC.
- 1983 "Rebelde y Solitario", ATC.
- 1984 "Situación Límite", ATC.
- 1986 "El Cisne Blanco", Puerto Rico.
- 1986 "Venganza de mujer", Canal 9.
- 1988 "Pasiones", Canal 9.
- 1990 - 1991 "Una voz en el teléfono", Canal 9. Martín Fierro Mejor Teleteatro.
- 1995 "Por siempre mujercitas", Canal 9.
- 1995 - 1996 "90 60 90 Modelos", Canal 9.
- 1997 "Te quiero, te quiero", Canal 9.
- 1999 "Margaritas", América.
- 2000 "Campeones", Canal 13.
- 2001 "El sodero de mi vida", Canal 13.
- 2002 "099 Central", Canal 13
- 2004 "Culpable de este amor", Telefe
- 2004 "Los Roldán", Telefe
- 2004 "Yendo de la cama al living", Canal 7
- 2005 "Amor en custodia", Telefe
- 2006 "Los Ex", Telefe
- 2006 "Amas de casa desesperadas", Canal 13
- 2006 - 2007 "La ley del amor", Telefe
- 2008 - 2009 "Por amor a vos", Canal 13
- 2009 - 2010 "Herencia de amor", Telefe
- 2010 - 2011 "Malparida", Canal 13
- 2012 "La dueña", Telefe
- 2014 "Camino al amor", Telefe
- 2015 Fronteras, Telefe

=== Film ===
- Hipólito y Evita (1973)
- Los días que me diste (1975)
- Sin querer, queriendo (1985)
- Más loco que un crucero (1990)
- El entretenedor (1991)
- Hunabku (2007)
- El túnel de los huesos (2011)
- Necrofobia (2014)

=== Theatre ===
- 1972 "El Día que Secuestraron al Papa", de J. Bethancour. Teatro Astral.
- 1973 "Estos Chicos de Ahora", de Alfonso Paso. Gira.
- 1977 "Pijama de Seda", España.
- 1981/82 "La Vida Fácil" o Los Galancitos,
- 1982/83 "Hasta Mañana si Dios Quiere", U.O.M.
- 1983/84 "De Madrugada es más Lindo", de Abel Santa Cruz.
- 1985 "Hotel Internacional", Mar del Plata. Teatro Provincial.
- 1987 "Día de Fiesta", Mar del Plata. Teatro Hermitage.
- 1989/90 "Golpe de Sol", Teatros Hermitage y Ateneo.
- 1991/92 "Y Mis Pantalones donde están", Teatro del Globo y Gira.
- 1994/95 "Las Mariposas Son Libres", Gira.
- 1999 "Las alegres mujeres de Shakespeare".
- 2005 "Bombones y champagne", Villa Carlos Paz, Córdoba.
- 2010/11 "Cuando Harry conoció a Sally", Multiteatro.
