= Gustavo Zajac =

Choreographer

Gustavo Zajac is a theater director, choreographer and professor of musical comedy and jazz dance. He currently resides in New York.

== Career ==
=== Theater and television ===
As an actor and dancer he played Tulsa in Gypsy with Mabel Manzotti, Ambar La Fox, Sandra Guida and Eleonora Wexler. He shared the stage with the first Argentine dancer Eleonora Cassano on the show Cassano Dancing, while on television he worked with the Argentine star Susana Giménez.

In 2002 he founded his own dance company called TEN, made up of ten dancers whom he formed and with whom he made public shows of Theater Dance and Lyrical Jazz participating in various festivals. He has also been a guest professor since 2002 in the international summer program of the Point Park University in Pittsburgh.

Zajac was summoned in Argentina as translator of David Leveaux and Jonathan Butterell, director and choreographer of Nine respectively. He served as Resident Director of the same musical starred by Juan Darthes, at the Metropolitan Theater of Buenos Aires. He also co-directed the plays "La lista completa" and "Paulatina aproximación" by Javier Daulte at Teatro Payró.

From the year 2000, Zajac began working in the city of Buenos Aires as assistant director and choreographer for various musicals such as "La Tiendita del Horror" directed by Robert Jess Roth and Matt West and played by Sandra Ballesteros and Diego Ramos. He also worked as a choreographer in "Aplausos" in 2004, with the actresses Claudia Lapaco and Paola Krum.

He also directed and choreographed the plays "Nativo", for which he received the Trinidad Guevara City of Buenos Aires Award for the best choreography; "Man of La Mancha" in 2005, starred by the singer Raúl Lavié and "Víctor Victoria" with Valeria Lynch in 2006, for which he won the ACE Award for Best Director in Musical Theater.

In addition, he was choreographic director of the tango shows "Tangorama" in 2006, "Bien Argentino" in 2008 and "Puerto Buenos Aires" in 2009, where he worked with the artists Mora Godoy, Patricia Sosa, Laura Fidalgo and Maximiliano Guerra.

In 2013 he returned to national television as the director of choreography for the program "Your Face Sounds Familiar", hosted by Alejandro Marley Wiebe for Telefé. Artists from the cycle included Carmen Barbieri, Lucía and Joaquín Galán from the Pimpinela duo, Laura Esquivel, Pablo Granados, Martín Campi Campilongo, Rocío Girao Diaz, Jey Mammon and Benjamín Amadeo.

In 2017 he directed Humberto Tortonese in the Argentine version of the box office comedy "An Act of God".

=== International work ===
By mid-1999 he started working on Broadway. His first performance as a choreographer was in association with Wise Guys, along with British film and theater director Sam Mendes at the New York Theater Project. Also, he participated with the choreographer Jonathan Butterell in the assembly of the commercial E-Bay on Broadway, broadcast on American television and also directed by Mendes.

In 2003 he traveled to New York, convened by the creative team of "Nine" on Broadway to work on a version of that musical played by Antonio Banderas and Chita Rivera. A year later, the same producer called him as associate choreographer of "Fiddler on the Roof" with the actor Alfred Molina and directed by David Leveaux.

In 2005 he entered the Asian market as a choreographer of "Nine" at the Art Sphere theater in Tokyo, Japan. He was the conductor and choreographer of the musicals "Blood weddings" and "Yerma" based on the plays of the Spanish writer Federico García Lorca. He also directed and choreographed "Argentango" in Tokyo and Osaka in 2014 and was choreographer of "The Lost Glory", musical that marked the 100th anniversary of the internationally known Takarazuka Revue Company, in 2015.

He was director and choreographer of "Fiddler on the Roof" at the National Theater of Korea in Seoul, Korea, in 2008. In that country, he also directed and created the choreography of "Lovers in Paris" and "Sweet come to me Stealthily" in 2010 and 2012, respectively.

He landed in Mexico City in 2010, as director and choreographer of "Timbiriche the musical", based on the themes of the legendary group Timbiriche.

In 2016 he was associate director and choreographer of the musical "Pirates of Penzance" at the mythical City Center of New York City. Also, he choreographed one of the productions of the "24 Hour Musical", starred by the Broadway star Bebe Neuwirth.

He was in charge of "Cyrano", the musical by Frank Wildhorn at the LG Arts Center in Seoul, in 2017. In 2018 he served as director and choreographer of "Barnum" at the Chung Mu Art Hall in Seoul, Korea.

During the same year he was the choreographer of "Evita" at the St Louis Repertory Theater, in St. Louis, Missouri, USA. He also was director and choreographer of "Bernarda Alba" Musical at Wooran Foundation, Seoul, Korea.

== Awards and nominations ==
Year	Award	Category	Play	Country	Result
2010	Argentine Council of Dance	Recognition of the Teaching Trajectory		Argentina	Winner
2006	Association of Critics of Shows, ACE	Best Director in Musical Work	Víctor Victoria	Argentina	Winner
2006-2009	Association of Critics of Shows, ACE	Best Choreography	Port of Buenos Aires, Tangorama and Bien Argentino	Argentina	Nominated
2006	Association of Critics of Shows, ACE	Best Choreography	Víctor Victoria	Argentina	Nominated
2005-2006	Association of Critics of Shows, ACE	Best Director in Musical Work	Man of La Mancha	Argentina	Nominated
2005	Government of the City of Buenos Aires	Best Choreography	Native	Argentina	Winner
2004	Association of Critics of Shows, ACE	Best Choreography	Aplausse	Argentina	Nominated
