= Araceli González =

Argentine actress

Araceli Gonzalez
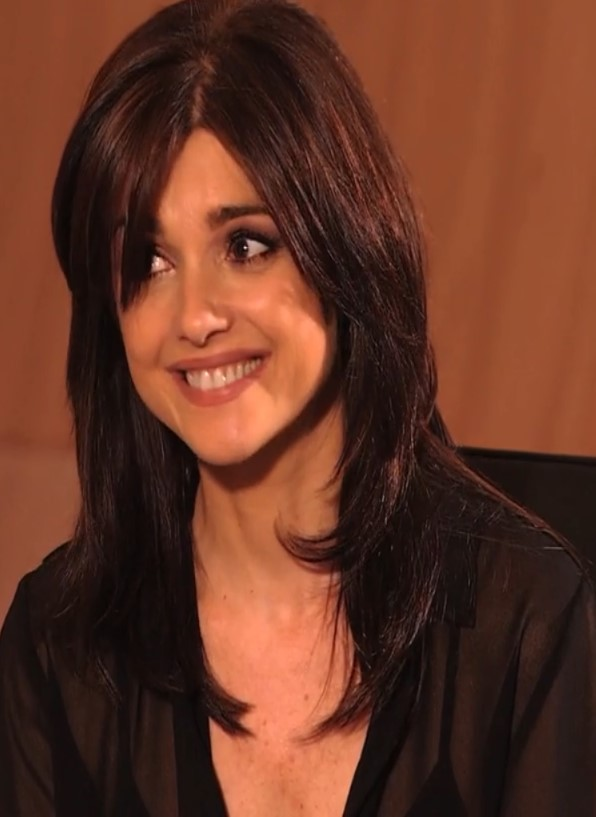
- Araceli González in 2014
- Born: June 19, 1967 (age 59); Buenos Aires, Argentina
- Occupations: actress, model, TV show hostess
- Years active: 1982–present
- Spouse(s): Rubén Torrente (m. 1988; div. 1991) Adrián Suar (m. 1996; div. 2002) Fabián Mazzei (m. 2008)
- Children: 2
- Awards: (1995) Martín Fierro award- Best actress

Araceli Edith González (Spanish pronunciation: [aɾaˈseli ɣonˈsales]; born June 19, 1967) is an Argentine actress, fashion model and TV host.

== Biography ==
González was born in Buenos Aires, Argentina.

She began performing arts at a young age after winning a dance tournament at the theater "el Globo Rojo" in Buenos Aires. At only nine years of age, she was invited by the Cohen Agency to participate in commercial productions. By the time she became a teenager, her career was starting to take course into the fashion industry, becoming the face of many fashion products and walking at many fashion shows in Argentina and Europe. Initially, her face became known in Buenos Aires during a massive hair campaign by Llongueras, an Argentine beauty salon chain, displaying the image of her straight dark hair in contrast to the curly reddish hair of the male model Vito. Thereafter, Araceli's modelling stardom was captivated by her full-body editorials for the campaign "Caro Coure". González's figure was linked to various trademarks around the world during the late 1980s and 1990s.

After working as actress in Europe, she returned to Argentina. In 2006-2007 she played Gabriela Solís in Amas de Casa Desesperadas. She also took part in numerous films and theater productions.

== Private life ==
González, who married at age 20 to actor Rubén Torrente in 1988, had already given birth to their first child, a daughter, Florencia Torrente, early that year; her marriage lasted until 1991. She also has a son Tomás Kirzner, from her marriage to Adrián Suar whom she married in 1996. They divorced in 2002. She has been married to her present husband Fabián Mazzei, since 2008.
