= Herederos de una venganza =

- Top: Emilia Piave (Marcela Kloosterboer), Antonio Puentes (Luciano Castro), Mercedes Leiva (Romina Gaetani), Rafael Ferrero (Federico Amador). Down: Lucas Leiva (Marco Antonio Caponi), Delicia Leiva (Betiana Blum), Octavio Capogreco (Rodolfo Ranni), Regina Piave (Leonor Benedetto), Vicente Roca (Antonio Grimau), Martín Sartre (Daniel Kuzniecka)
- Genre: Telenovela
- Created by: Adrián Suar
- Developed by: Pol-Ka
- Written by: Ricardo Rodríguez; Susana Cardozo
- Directed by: Jorge Montero; Jorge Bechara
- Starring: Luciano Castro; Romina Gaetani; Marcela Kloosterboer; Federico Amador; Benjamín Vicuña; Leonor Benedetto; Rodolfo Ranni; Antonio Grimau; Marco Antonio Caponi; Betiana Blum
- Opening theme: Herederos; David Bisbal
- Country of origin: Argentina
- Original language: Spanish
- No. of episodes: (list of episodes)

Production
- Executive producer: Paula Granica

Original release
- Network: Canal 13
- Release: January 17, 2011 – February 10, 2012

Related
- Malparida; Lobo

Herederos de una venganza (International Title: Legacy of Revenge) is a 2011 Argentine telenovela aired by Channel 13 in the prime time. The characters inhabit a small fictional village named Vidisterra. The cast includes Luciano Castro, Romina Gaetani, Marcela Kloosterboer, Federico Amador, Leonor Benedetto, Rodolfo Ranni, Antonio Grimau, Daniel Kuzniecka, Marco Antonio Caponi, and Betiana Blum.

== Creation ==
Channel 13 had great success in 2009 and 2010 with Valientes and Malparida, primetime telenovelas with vengeance plots and a dramatic genre. Luciano Castro, lead actor from Valientes, was again lead actor for this project, along with Romina Gaetani, who worked at another successful 2010 dramatic telenovela, Botineras.

Production started in November 2010. The initial scenes in the highway were filmed at the highways near Pilar. The wedding of Antonio and Angie, one of the plot starting points, was filmed during three days at Bella Vista, and was followed by filmings at scenarios.

== Plot ==
The telenovela takes place in the fictional Argentine village of Vidisterra. All local wineries were combined into a single one, owned by Regina Piave and the mayor Octavio Capogreco. Wine is the village's most important product, giving great power to the owners of the winery. Regina, Octavio and other influential people of the village are also members of a secret lodge aiming to survive a potential end of the world. The main male character, Antonio Puentes, was about to get married at Vidisterra, but his wife died in an unclear murder promoted by the lodge. He finally stays in the village, as heir of his fiancee's sharings in the winery. The main female character is Mercedes Leiva, who was in prison for killing an abusive spouse, but as her husband was popular in the village, she is rejected by most people once released from prison.

== Reception ==
The telenovela was first aired on January 17, 2011. Telefe opposed it with another telenovela in the same time, El elegido. Initial ratings were higher for "Herederos...", with nearly 25 points over 19.

== Cast ==
- Luciano Castro as Antonio Puentes
- Romina Gaetani as Mercedes Leiva
- Benjamín Vicuña as Benicio Echague (Deceased)
- Marcela Klosterboer as Emilia Piave
- Marco Antonio Caponi as Lucas Leiva
- Federico Amador as Rafael Ferrero
- Leonor Benedetto as Regina Piave (Deceased)
- Rodolfo Ranni as Octavio Capogreco (Deceased)
- Antonio Grimau as Vicente Roca (Deceased)
- Daniel Kuzniecka was Martín Sartre (Deceased)
- Betiana Blum as Delicia Leiva
- Manuela Pal as Paula Lezcano
- Felipe Colombo as Bernardo Berlanga
- Federico Salles as Catulo
- Sergio Surraco as Cosme Capogreco
- Noemi Frenkel as Gretel(Deceased)
- Virginia Kaufmann as Nurse Frida
- Victorio D´alesandro as Miguel Moran (Deceased)
- Guillermo Aregno as Pedro Cortez
- Cecilia Missere as Sabina de Cortez
- Gimena Accardi as China Villegas (Deceased)
- Susana Ortiz as Witch Elvira (Deceased)
- Florencia Torrente was Lola Capogreco (Deceased)
- Paula Morales was Julia Monteleon (Deceased)
- Benjamín Amadeo as Andres Gutierrez (Deceased)
- Agustina Lecuona as Isabella Ibarra
- Mariano Torre as Paul Barquinero (Deceased)
- Ernesto Claudio was Judge Balerza (Deceased)
