= Damián de Santo =

Argentine actor

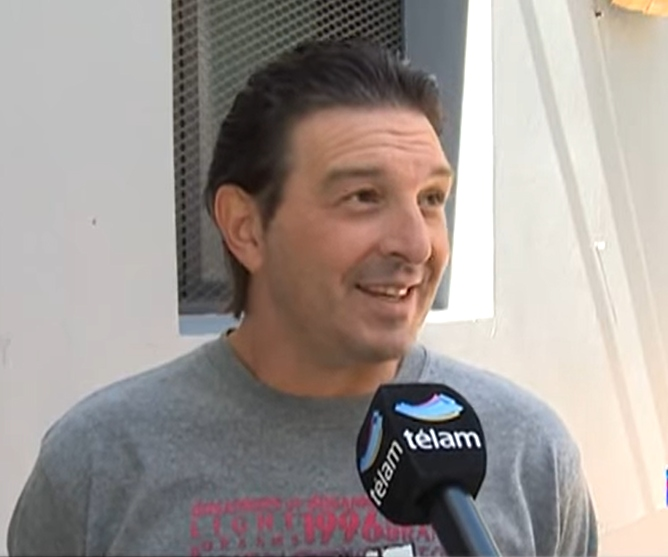
- De Santo in 2013
- Born: Damián Álvaro de Santo; June 12, 1968 (age 57); Buenos Aires, Argentina
- Occupation: Actor
- Years active: 1988–present
- Spouse: Vanina Bilous (2001–present)
- Children: Camilo de Santo; Joaquín de Santo

Damián Álvaro de Santo (born June 12, 1968) is an Argentine actor.

== Biography ==
He began his studies of dramatic art with Lito Cruz and studied in the Casa del Teatro.

== Personal life ==
He was the boyfriend of the Argentine singer Laura Miller. He has been married since 2001 with Vanina Bilous, a tango dancer, with whom he has two children Joaquín and Camilo. Since 2005, he lives for a large part of the year in the Cordoba town of Villa Giardino. where he owns a cabin complex.

== Career ==
His first job as an actor was in the play La tiendita del horror. At that time he met Fernán Mirás, who introduced him to the world of television after proposing a rapist role in the series Zona de riesgo. At that time he also worked on the television series Princesa next to Gabriel Corrado. Damián de Santo would already be a known face for supporting roles in series like Canto rodado, Aprender a volar, Sheik, Amigovios and Mi cuñado. However, the opportunity came to work on the successful series Poliladron of Adrián Suar. From this intervention he began to gain notoriety, especially in the role of Ariel Quintana, the gay lawyer of Verdad consecuencia and Gonzalo Pierna Molina, a rich boy who hides in cocaine to avoid his family in Vulnerables. After a television impás, he returns with the sitcom Amor Mío next to Romina Yankelevich and in 2008 he returns to work with Romina Yankelevich in the television series B&B: Bella y Bestia. In cinema his appearances are still reduced to secondary roles in important productions such as El sueño de los héroes, Alma mía and Un día de suerte.

== Filmography ==
=== Television ===
Year	Title	Character	Channel
1992-1993	Princesa	Damián Ventura	Canal 9
1993	Canto rodado, escuela de canto	Damián	Canal 13
1993	Mi cuñado		Telefe
1994-1995	Aprender a volar	Poli	Canal 13
1995	Amigovios	Padre Miguel Hernández	Canal 13
1995	Poliladron	Fabián	Canal 13
1996-1998	Verdad consecuencia	Ariel Quintana	Canal 13
1999-2000	Vulnerables	Gonzalo Pierna Molina	Canal 13
2001	22, el loco	Fabián Martini	Canal 13
2002	Tiempo final		Telefe
2002	Infieles		Telefe
2003	Malandras	Fernando Carrizo	Canal 9
2003	Disputas	Alejandro	Telefe
2004	Los pensionados	Tony Carballo	Canal 13
2004	Locas de amor	Víctor Wernlli	Canal 13
2005	Amor Mío	Marcos Sinclair	Telefe
2008	B&B: Bella y Bestia	Benito "Benny" Cifaratti	Telefe
2008	Casi Ángeles	Profesor de las risas	Telefe
2008	Oportunidades	Miguel	Canal 13
2009-2010	Botineras	Eduardo "Tato" Marín	Telefe
2010	Lo que el tiempo nos dejó		Telefe
2011	Decisiones de vida	Mario	Canal 9
2013	Viento sur		América TV
2014-2015	Viudas e hijos del Rock & Roll	Diego Lamas	Telefe
2016	Educando a Nina	Checho Quiroga	Telefe

=== Movies ===
Year	Movie	Character	Director
1997	La furia	Sebastián	Juan Bautista Stagnaro
1997	El sueño de los héroes	Pegoraro	Sergio Renán
1999	Alma mía	Tano	Daniel Barone
1999	Condor Crux	Condor Crux (Voice)	Juan Pablo Buscarini, Swan Glecer and Pablo Holcer
2001	Cabeza de tigre	Juan José Castelli	Claudio Etcheberry
2001	Historias de Argentina en vivo		
2001	+bien	Galo	Eduardo Capilla
2002	Un día de suerte	Toni	Sandra Gugliotta
2003	Imposible	Bruno	Cristian Pauls
2003	La loma... no todo es lo que parece	Toti	Roberto Luis Garay
2007	Yo soy sola	Tomás	Tatiana Mereñuk
2013	La boleta	Pablo	Andrés Paternostro
2017	Yo soy así, Tita de Buenos Aires	Luis Sandrini	María Teresa Costantini
2019	La rosa del desierto		

=== Television Programs ===
Year	Title	Channel	Notes
2018-2019	Morfi, todos a la mesa	Telefe	Television Host

== Awards and nominations ==
Year	Award	Category	Work	Result
2001	Martín Fierro Awards	Supporting Actor	22, el loco	Winner
2002	Martín Fierro Awards	Special Male Participation	Tiempo final and Infieles	Nominated
2003	Martín Fierro Awards	Special Male Performance	Disputas	Nominated
2004	Martín Fierro Awards	Special Participation in Fiction	Locas de amor	Nominated
2005	Martín Fierro Awards	Comedy Protagonist Actor	Amor Mío	Nominated
2008	Martín Fierro Awards	Comedy Protagonist Actor	B&B: Bella y Bestia	Nominated
2009	Martín Fierro Awards	Novel Protagonist Actor	Botineras	Nominated
2010	Martín Fierro Awards	Novel Protagonist Actor	Botineras	Nominated
2010	Tato Awards	Novel Protagonist Actor	Botineras	Winner
