= Jean Pierre Noher =

French-born Argentine actor (born 1956)

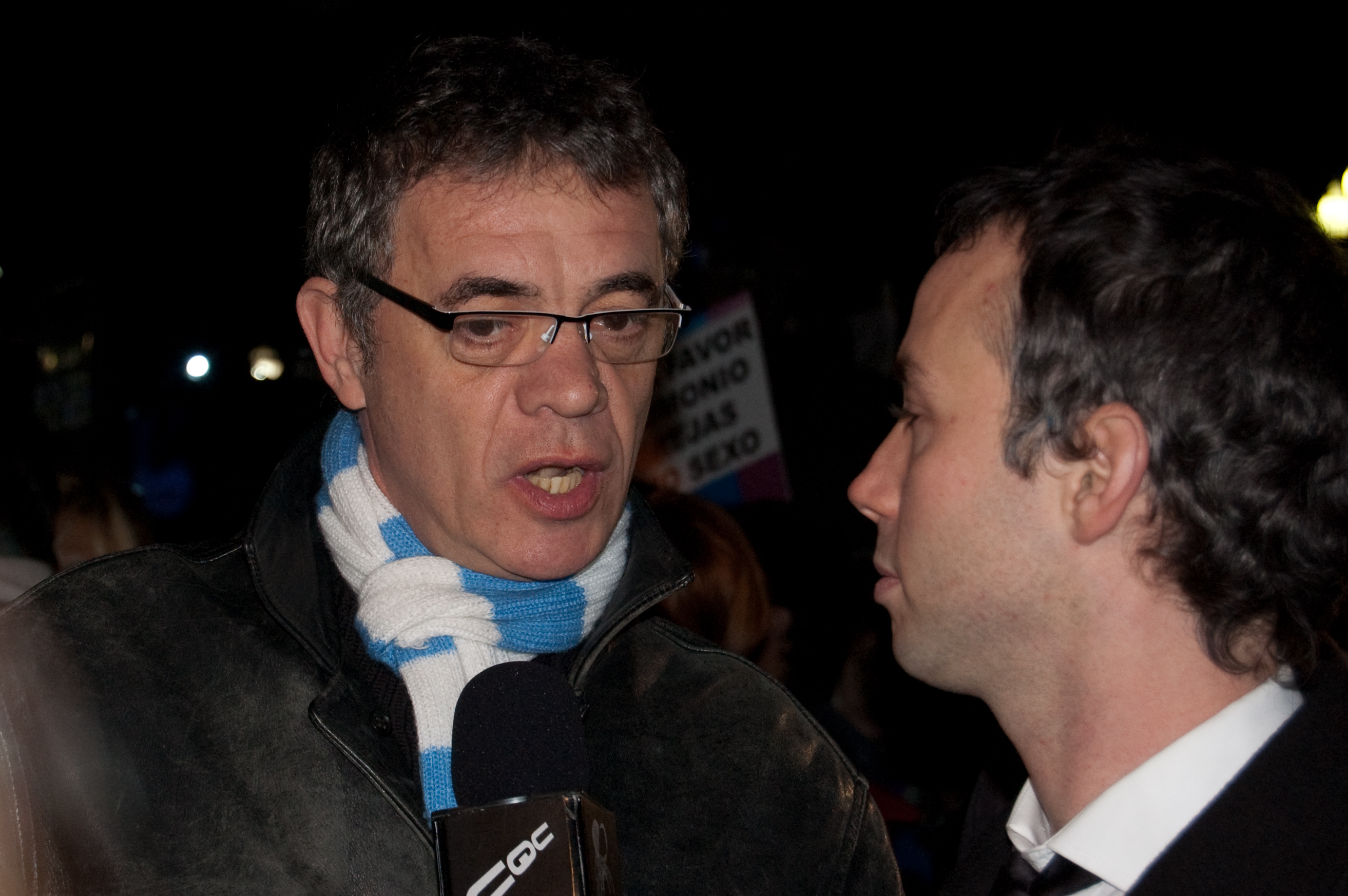
- Noher in 2010
- Born: Jean Pierre Noher; May 5, 1956 (age 70); Paris, France
- Years active: 1979–present
- Children: Michel Noher
- Website: jeanpierrenoher.com.ar

Jean Pierre Noher (born May 5, 1956) is a French-born Argentine actor.

== Biography ==
A great-nephew of director Max Ophüls, Noher was born in Paris, in 1956. He relocated to Argentina as a young man, and debuted on Argentine television with a part in a soap opera, Novia de vacaciones, in 1979. He then began work in the local theatre, and debuted in a local production of Romeo and Juliet, in 1982.

His first film role was in Alejandro Doria's tragedy, Darse cuenta, in 1984, though Noher continued to work mostly in the theatre in subsequent years. Noher's first leading role was as a land developer with a change of heart in Eduardo Spagnuolo's Sin reserva (1997), and in 2000, he was cast as writer Jorge Luis Borges in Javier Torre's fact-based Un amor de Borges; the role secured him awards at the Gramado Film Festival, Miami International Film Festival, and the Biarritz International Festival of Latin American Cinema.

Noher played Ernesto Guevara Lynch, the father of Che Guevara in the opening scenes of Walter Salles' The Motorcycle Diaries (2004). Remaining active in the theatre, he worked with two veteran actors as directors: China Zorrilla and Victor Laplace, who in 2010 reprised his film role as populist leader Juan Perón opposite Noher's Borges (an opponent of Perón) in Borges y Perón.

Noher's son, Michel Noher, born in Buenos Aires in 1983, has starred in Alejandro Doria's biopic, Las manos (2006), and in Francis Ford Coppola's 2009 feature, Tetro.

== Filmography ==
Film
Year	Title	Role	Director
2000	Un amor de Borges	Jorge Luis Borges	Javier Torre
2002	Valentín	Uncle Chiche	Alejandro Agresti
2004	The Motorcycle Diaries	Alberto Granado	Walter Salles
2006	El Amor y la ciudad	Pedro	María Teresa Costantini
2009	José Ignacio	Fernando	Ricardo Preve
2009	Do Começo ao Fim	Pedro	Aluizio Abranches
2012	The German Friend	Philipp Löwenstein	Jeanine Meerapfel

Television
Year	Title	Role	Notes
2004	Los Simuladores		
2004	Los Roldán	Juan Pablo (Jean-Paul) Mancini	
2005	Mandrake	J.J. Soares	
2006	Amas de Casa Desesperadas	Jorge Pereira	
2007	Mandrake	J.J. Soares	
2008	A Favorita	Pepe Molinos	
2010	Viver a Vida		
2012	Avenida Brasil	Martin García Hernández	
2013	Flor do Caribe	Duque (Duque de Charllain)	
2014	O Rebu	Pierre	
2015	Sete Vidas	Diego Viegas	
2016	Sol Nascente	Patrick	
2018	Samantha!	Pablo Anton	
2021	Filhas de Eva	Joaquim Benitez	
