= Amas de casa desesperadas (Argentine TV series) =

- Created by: Marcos Carnevale after Marc Cherry's original series
- Starring: Mercedes Morán; Araceli González; Gabriela Toscano; Carola Reyna; Romina Gaetani
- Narrated by: Cecilia Roth
- Theme music composer: Alberto Slezynger and Vinicio Ludovic
- Country of origin: Argentina
- No. of episodes: 23

Production
- Running time: 60 minutes
- Production companies: Buena Vista International Television; Pol-Ka Producciones

Original release
- Network: Canal 13; Azteca Trece
- Release: August 30, 2006 – January 24, 2007

Amas de casa desesperadas is an Argentine television series, it was originally aired on Canal 13 from 30 August 2006 to 24 January 2007. Set in the fictional Manzanares Street, a suburb surrounding Buenos Aires, the series follows the lives of four housewives and the domestic problems and daily mysteries surrounding their husbands, friends and neighbors, which can be more sinister than they appear. The series' tone combines elements of drama, comedy, mystery, farce, soap opera and satire.

Based on the American television series, Desperate Housewives, it was developed for Argentina by Buena Vista International Television (Disney) and Pol-Ka Producciones. The show's only season was broadcast by Canal 13 in Argentina, and also by other networks in Uruguay and Paraguay.

== Plot ==
The show opens with the mysterious suicide of housewife Alicia Oviedo on a beautiful day in the suburbs, on a street called Manzanares. Alicia, who narrates the show from the afterlife, had four friends: Vera Sherer, the seemingly perfect mother of two teenagers struggling to save her marriage; Lía Salgarí, the mother of four whose husband is always away on business; Susana Martini, the divorced mother in search of love, who finds it in the form of her new neighbour Miguel Delfino, who has a secret of his own; and Gabriela Solís, the materialistic ex-runway model who cheats on her husband. While trying to be good wives and mothers, the four friends also try to find out why their friend committed suicide. The discovery of a blackmail note among Alicia's belongings, a therapy session tape in which she admits her real name was Angela, and her widowed husband's strange behaviour really make them wonder about the mystery surrounding their deceased friend.

== Origins ==
Buena Vista International, a subsidiary of the Walt Disney Company (which also owns ABC, the channel on which Desperate Housewives airs in the United States), searched in Brazil, Ecuador, Argentina and Colombia to find a production company capable of adapting the series for the Spanish-speaking market. Adrian Suar and Fernando Blanco's Pol-Ka Producciones in Argentina was selected. Immediately, the actresses were chosen and the construction of Manzanares Street began on the town of Pilar, Buenos Aires.

== Cast and characters ==
This is a list of the major characters of the series, as well as their counterpart in the original, American, series and the actors portraying them.

Character	Original character	Argentine actor
Lía Salgari	Lynette Scavo	Mercedes Morán
Gabriela Solís	Gabrielle Solis	Araceli González
Susana Martinez	Susan Mayer	Gabriela Toscano
Vera Sherer	Bree Van de Kamp	Carola Reyna
Alicia Oviedo	Mary Alice Young	Cecilia Roth
Carla Otegui	Edie Britt	Romina Gaetani
Miguel Delfino	Mike Delfino	Juan Palomino
Pablo Oviedo	Paul Young	Raúl Rizzo
Tomás Salgari	Tom Scavo	Carlos Santamaría
Carlos Solís	Carlos Solis	Martín Seefeld
Ricardo Sherer	Rex Van de Kamp	Jorge Suárez
Julieta Martínez	Julie Mayer	Eliana González
René Oviedo	Zach Young	Nahuel Pérez Biscayart
Juan Juárez	John Rowland	Rodrigo Guirao
Martín Sherer	Andrew Van de Kamp	Martin Piroyansky
Daniela Sherer	Danielle Van de Kamp	Maida Andrenacci
Esteban Martinez	Karl Mayer	Raúl Taibo
Jorge Pereira	George Williams	Jean Pierre Noher
Felisa Gutierrez	Felicia Tilman	Luisina Brando
Marta Hidalgo	Martha Huber	Tina Serrano
Elvira Reinoso	Karen McCluskey	Adriana Aizemberg
Julio Mitre	Noah Taylor	Rodolfo Ranni

== Filming locations ==
The set of the street, some of which is made up of real houses, is located on a studio of Pol-ka, in Pilar, Buenos Aires, which was land due to be turned into an upscale gated community. Manzanares was specially built for the production of the three Desperate Housewives versions: the Argentine, Latin (USA), Colombian-Ecuadorian and Brazilian versions.

According to Marcos Carnevale, the writer of the Argentine version, Manzanares was the hardest thing to adapt. The houses had to look “more Latin”, but still remain similar to the original show's street, so the houses were painted in a more Latino style (for example, the Solises’ house is red instead of yellow).

From the outside, Vera's home has a set of windows either side of the front porch. However indoors, windows can only be seen on one side of the front door. This is because the inside of Vera's house is actually shot on a soundstage. Along with the houses of Lía, Marta Hidalgo, Carla and Alicia, is just a façade.

There is a 10th house on the street, that is hidden (next to Elvira Reinoso's house) and can only be seen when the camera pulls away on the ending of the first episode. The “production house” is used by the crew as an office.

At the end of Manzanares, by Carla's house, there is a cul-de-sac. However, cars are seen both entering and leaving the neighborhood from there.

After Carla's house was burned down in the first episode, her new house started being built next to her old. The old house façade was kept, repainted, and the interior was reconstructed and was used on episode 21 as the Obligado's house (Mullins in the original show).
