= Behnisch =

Behnisch may refer to:

- Günter Behnisch (1922–2010), German architect
- Willi Behnisch (born 1956), Argentine cinematographer, film director, and screenplay writer
- Behnisch Architekten, an international architectural firm
