= Julieta Díaz =

Argentine actress

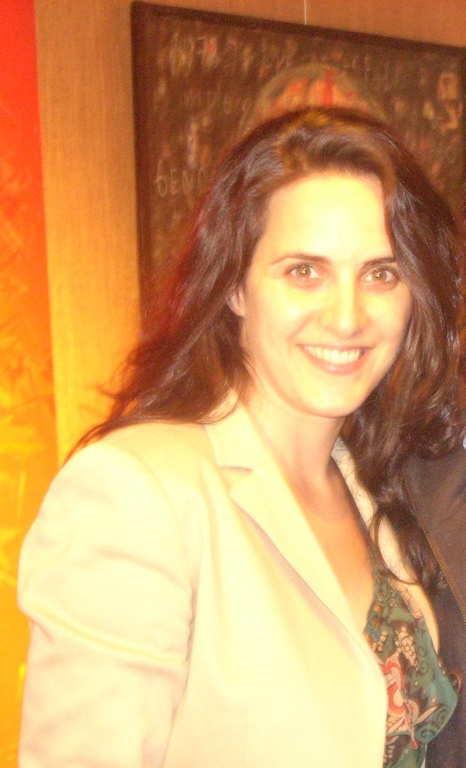
- Díaz in 2010
- Born: Julieta Solange Díaz Núñez; September 9, 1977 (age 47); Buenos Aires, Argentina
- Occupations: Actress; Model
- Years active: 1995–present
- Height: 1.67 m (5 ft 5 1/2 in)
- Spouse: Brent Federighi (m. 2007; sep. 2018)
- Children: 1

Julieta Solange Díaz Núñez (born September 9, 1977) is an Argentine model and actress.

== Biography ==
Julieta Díaz was born on September 9, 1977, in Buenos Aires, Argentina. She began studying theater at age 12. Her father, Ricardo Díaz Mourelle, an actor over 35 years ago, was one of her great teachers. Her mother, María Núñez, is an astrologer.

== Career ==
At age 17 she studied theater with Rubens Correa, when, through Fernando Spiner, she appeared at the casting and was chosen for the miniseries Bajamar, la costa del silencio. She participated in Verdad consecuencia, Nueve lunas, Carola Casini, Como pan caliente, De poeta y de loco, Gasoleros and La condena de Gabriel Doyle among other television programs. Meanwhile, she continued taking classes with Cristina Moreira, Rubens Correa and Javier Margulis. The recognition came with Campeones de la vida and from there he jumped to a co-star, along with Oscar Martínez and Catherine Fulop, in Ilusiones. In little more than three years she went from becoming a popular actress to becoming a better actress, receiving the Clarín Shows Award for her role in 099 Central. She was also convened by the Mexican group Maná for the realization of their video clip treacherous Butterfly, by Gustavo Cerati for Crime, Diego Torres for Dreams, among other video clips. In 2003 she starred with Osvaldo Laport and Juan Darthés the soap opera Soy gitano. The following year she was the protagonist of the unit Locas de amor. For the soap opera Soy gitano she took flamenco classes with Claudia Bauthian, Laura Manzella, Marcela Suez and the great teacher La China. In 2005 she acted in the work Emma Bovary. That same year she was seen on TV starring in a chapter of Botines and two of Mujeres asesinas. Meanwhile, she continued taking classes with Ana María Bovo, Gabriel Chamé Buen Día and Cristina Moreira. In 2006 she participated in two other chapters of Mujeres asesinas and two chapters of Al límite. During 2009 she starred in the hit soap opera Valientes, at the same time that she performed the theatrical season in Buenos Aires and during the summer in Mar del Plata with the play El año que viene a la misma hora with Adrián Suar, directed by Marcos Carnevale. In 2010, and until today, she began taking singing lessons with teacher and vocal coach Katie Viqueria. In 2011 she starred alongside Facundo Arana, Benjamin Rojas and Lali Espósito the soap opera Cuando me sonreís. In 2012 she had a special participation in Graduados, fiction of Underground which was issued by Telefe and was starring Nancy Dupláa and Daniel Hendler. In addition, she was called to make a special participation in Condicionados unit starring Soledad Silveyra and Oscar Martínez which was issued by Canal 13. In cinema she starred in 2006 Maradona, the Hand of God; in 2007 La señal; in 2008 Norma Arrostito and Gaby, la montonera. In cinema she starred in 2011 Juan y Eva with the direction of Paula De Luque. She also participated in Derecho de familia, Herencia, Déjala correr and Ruptura. In 2012 the film Dos más dos, was released starring alongside Adrián Suar and with the direction of Diego Kaplan. In 2013 she starred alongside Guillermo Francella the film Corazón de León with the direction of Marcos Carnevale. In 2013 she also starred, together with Gabriel Goity and Laura Esquivel, Los Locos Addams, the Argentine version of the Broadway musical, in the role of Morticia Addams. In 2014 she participated in the successful En terapia alongside Diego Peretti. For this performance she received the Martín Fierro Award for Best Supporting Actress. She also made a special participation in Sres. Papis alongside Joaquín Furriel. During the same year she starred in the film Refugiado. In 2015 she participated in the unit La casa. In 2016, she star in the unitary of Pol-ka Silencios de familia with Adrián Suar and Florencia Bertotti. For several years now she has been one of the actresses representing Head & Shoulders in Argentina.

== Television ==
Year	Title	Character	Channel
1995	Nueve lunas	Luciana's friend	Canal 13
1995	Bajamar, la costa del silencio	María	Canal 9
1996	De poeta y de loco	Carolina	Canal 13
1996	Como pan caliente		Canal 13
1996	Verdad consecuencia		Canal 13
1997	Carola Casini	Yanina	Canal 13
1997	Archivo Negro 2	Witness	Canal 13
1998	La condena de Gabriel Doyle		Canal 9
1998	Gasoleros	Jimena	Canal 13
1999	Campeones de la vida	Carla D'alessandro	Canal 13
2000	Campeones de la vida	Carla D'alessandro	Canal 13
2000	Ilusiones	Maia Carregal	Canal 13
2002	099 Central	Gabriela Valentini	Canal 13
2003-2004	Soy gitano	Mora Amaya	Canal 13
2004	Locas de amor	Juana Vázquez	Canal 13
2005	Botines	Lisy	Canal 13
2005	Mujeres asesinas	Ana María Gómez Tejerina and Zulema	Canal 13
2006	Mujeres asesinas	Mónica and Felisa	Canal 13
2006	Al límite	Pato	Telefe
2008	Algo habrán hecho	Selva	Telefe
2008	Todos contra Juan	Herself	América TV
2009	Valientes	Alma Varela	Canal 13
2010	Todos contra Juan 2	Herself	Telefe
2010	Para vestir santos	Ema Brossio	Canal 13
2010	Lo que el tiempo nos dejó	Ada Falcón	Telefe
2011	Cuando me sonreís	Luna Rivas	Telefe
2012	Graduados	Sandra Schejtman	Telefe
2012	Condicionados	Sagrada	Canal 13
2013	Historia clínica	Tita Merello	Telefe
2014	Sres. Papis	Daiana	Telefe
2014	En terapia	Laura Márquez	TV Pública
2015	La Casa	Helena	TV Pública
2015	La verdad		TV Pública
2016	Silencios de familia	Elisa Arévalo de Diamante	Canal 13
2017	Fanny, la fan	Marcia Enríquez/Enrique Marcial	Telefe
2018	La caída	Andrea Feinn	TV Pública
2019	Pequeña Victoria	Jazmín Jorgensen	Telefe
2019	La vida en la mitad		Netflix

== Movies ==
Year	Movie	Character	Director
2000	Rockabilly	Pastelito	Sebastián De Caro
2000	Lobos Marinos		Matías Guitler
2001	Déjala correr	Mónica	Alberto Lecchi
2001	Herencia	Luz	Paula Hernández
2005	Muñequita	Muñequita	Silvana Lopa and Brenda Urlacher
2006	Derecho de familia	Sandra	Daniel Burman
2007	Maradona, the Hand of God	Claudia Villafañe	Marco Risi
2007	La señal	Gloria	Ricardo Darín
2008	Norma Arrostito, la Gaby	Norma Arrostito	Luis César D'Angiolillo
2009	Vienen por el oro, vienen por todo		Pablo D'Alo Abba and Cristian Harbaruk
2009	Negro Buenos Aires	Victoria	Ramón Térmens
2011	Juan y Eva	Eva Perón	Paula de Luque
2012	2+2	Emilia	Diego Kaplan
2013	Corazón de León	Ivana Cornejo	Marcos Carnevale
2014	Refugiado	Laura	Diego Lerman
2015	Tras la pantalla	Herself	Marcos Martínez
2017	El fútbol o yo	Verónica	Marcos Carnevale
2019	No soy tu mami	Paula	Marcos Carnevale
2019	La forma de las horas	Ana	Paula de Luque
2023	Women on the Edge	Vera Lombardi	Azul Lombardía

== Theater ==
Year	Title	Character	Theater
1997	El dueño del circo		
1997	Cenicienta en Elsinor		
2000	A propósito de la duda		Teatro por la identidad
2001	El inocente		Teatro por la identidad
2002	Cesárea		Teatro por la identidad
2003	El libro de Ruth		
2004	Plegaria contra el silencio		Teatro por la identidad
2004	Emma Bovary		
2005	Ángel portador		
2006	Tontos por amor		
2006	Las mujeres de Ibsen		
2007	Espacio abierto		Teatro por la identidad
2007	La Celestina		
2007	El pan del adiós		
2007	El zoo de cristal		
2008	Solas		
2008	La esposa constante		Teatrísimo
2009-2010	El año que viene a la misma hora		
2013	Los Locos Addams		

== Videoclips ==
Year	Artist	Song
1997	Alejandro Lerner	Volver a empezar
2001	Diego Torres	Sueños
2003	Maná	Mariposa traicionera
2006	Gustavo Cerati	Crimen

== Awards and nominations ==
Year	Award	Category	Work	Result
2002	Clarín Awards	Best Television Actress	099 Central	Winner
2003	Martín Fierro Awards	Best Supporting Actress	099 Central	Winner
2003	Silver Condor Awards	Best Supporting Actress	Herencia	Winner
2004	Martín Fierro Awards	Best Leading Actress of a Novel	Soy gitano	Nominated
2004	Clarín Awards	Best Television Actress	Locas de amor	Winner
2004	Clarín Awards	Best Actress Revelation in Theater	Emma Bovary	Winner
2004	ACE Awards	Best Leading Actress in Drama	Emma Bovary	Nominated
2005	Martín Fierro Awards	Best Miniseries Actress	Locas de amor	Winner
2005	ACE Awards	Best Leading Actress in Drama	Emma Bovary	Nominated
2006	Silver Condor Awards	Best Actress	Derecho de familia	Nominated
2006	Sur Awards	Best Actress	Derecho de familia	Nominated
2007	Sur Awards	Best Actress	La señal	Nominated
2009	ACE Awards	Best Leading Actress in Comedy	El año que viene a la misma hora	Nominated
2010	Martín Fierro Awards	Best Leading Actress of a Novel	Valientes	Nominated
2011	Martín Fierro Awards	Best Miniseries Actress	Lo que el tiempo nos dejó	Nominated
2011	Martín Fierro Awards	Best Leading Actress of a Novel	Valientes	Nominated
2011	Sur Awards	Best Actress	Juan y Eva	Nominated
2012	Martín Fierro Awards	Best Leading Actress of a Novel	Cuando me sonreís	Nominated
2012	Silver Condor Awards	Best Actress	Juan y Eva	Nominated
2012	Sur Awards	Best Actress	Dos más dos	Nominated
2013	Silver Condor Awards	Best Actress	Dos más dos	Nominated
2013	Sur Awards	Best Actress	Corazón de León	Winner
2014	Silver Condor Awards	Best Actress	Corazón de León	Nominated
2015	Martín Fierro Awards	Best Supporting Actress	En terapia	Winner
2015	Silver Condor Awards	Best Actress	Refugiado	Winner
2017	Martín Fierro Awards	Best Leading Actress in Miniseries	Silencios de familia	Winner
