= Jean Pierre Reguerraz =

Argentine actor

Jean Pierre Reguerraz (right) in a scene from his 2006 film hit, El Amor y la ciudad with co-star Adrián Navarro

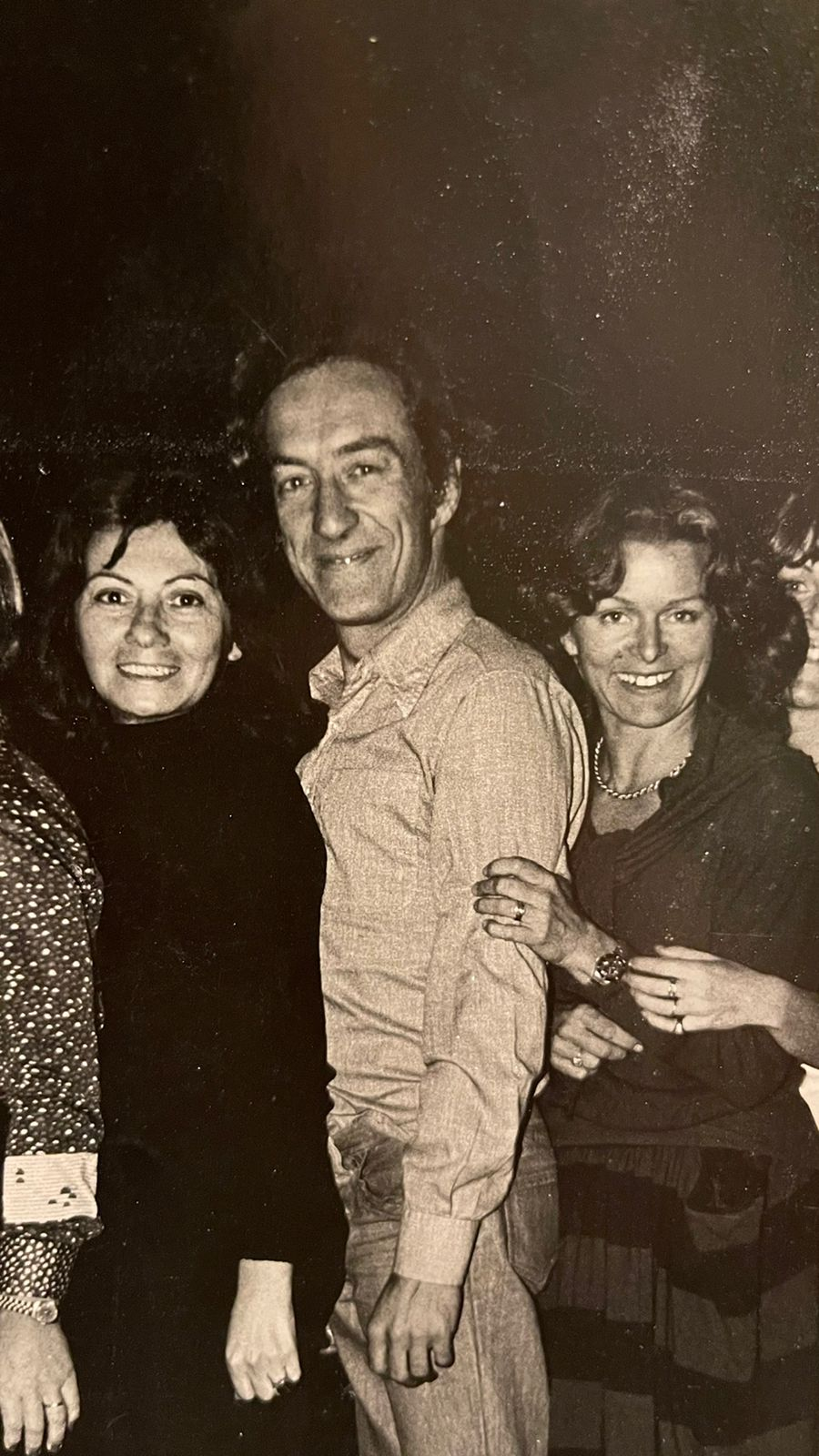
Jean Pierre Reguerraz at the center accompanied by Regina Lamm (right) and Maria Elena Rivera (left), in 1973.

Jean-Pierre Reguerraz (1939 – November 2, 2007) was an Argentine stage and film actor noted for his deep bass voice. Born in Buenos Aires, Argentina, in 1939 of French parents, he studied acting in Europe before returning to Argentina in 1960 for various stage roles. He performed at the Teatro Payro in Marathon, Rayuela, and Ivanov.

He appeared in 35 films, mostly in supporting roles, including the critically acclaimed El Armario in 2001. In the 2006 Oscar-entry film Family Law, which was distributed in the United States, he played "Uncle Eduardo", a shady attorney. Movie critic Ty Burr of The Boston Globe said Family Law "gets a lift" from Reguerraz' portrayal. Other films include El Amor y la ciudad (2006) and Garage Olimpo (1999), as "Juan Carlos". His last film appearance was in Luisa, filmed in mid-2007.

Reguerraz died at age 68 on November 2, 2007, after what was described as a "long illness".

== Select filmography ==
- XXY (2006)
- Family Law (2006), as "Tío Eduardo"
- Las Manos (The Hands - 2006), "Spagnuolo"
- Chicha Tu Madre (2006)
- La vida por Perón (2005)
- Que absurdo es haber crecido (2000), as "Dr. Castembacher"
- Eva Perón (1996) as "Mr. Menendez"
- Of Love and Shadows (1994), as the Cardinal
- De Eso No Se Habla (I Don't Want to Talk About It - 1994), as "Mr. Poussineau"
- Hostage (1992)
- El lado Oscuro del corazon (The Dark Side of the Heart) (1992) as "Gustavo"
- Naked Tango (1991), as the Jewish gang boss
- I, the Worst of All (1990)
