= Juan Minujín =

Argentine actor and film director (born 1975)

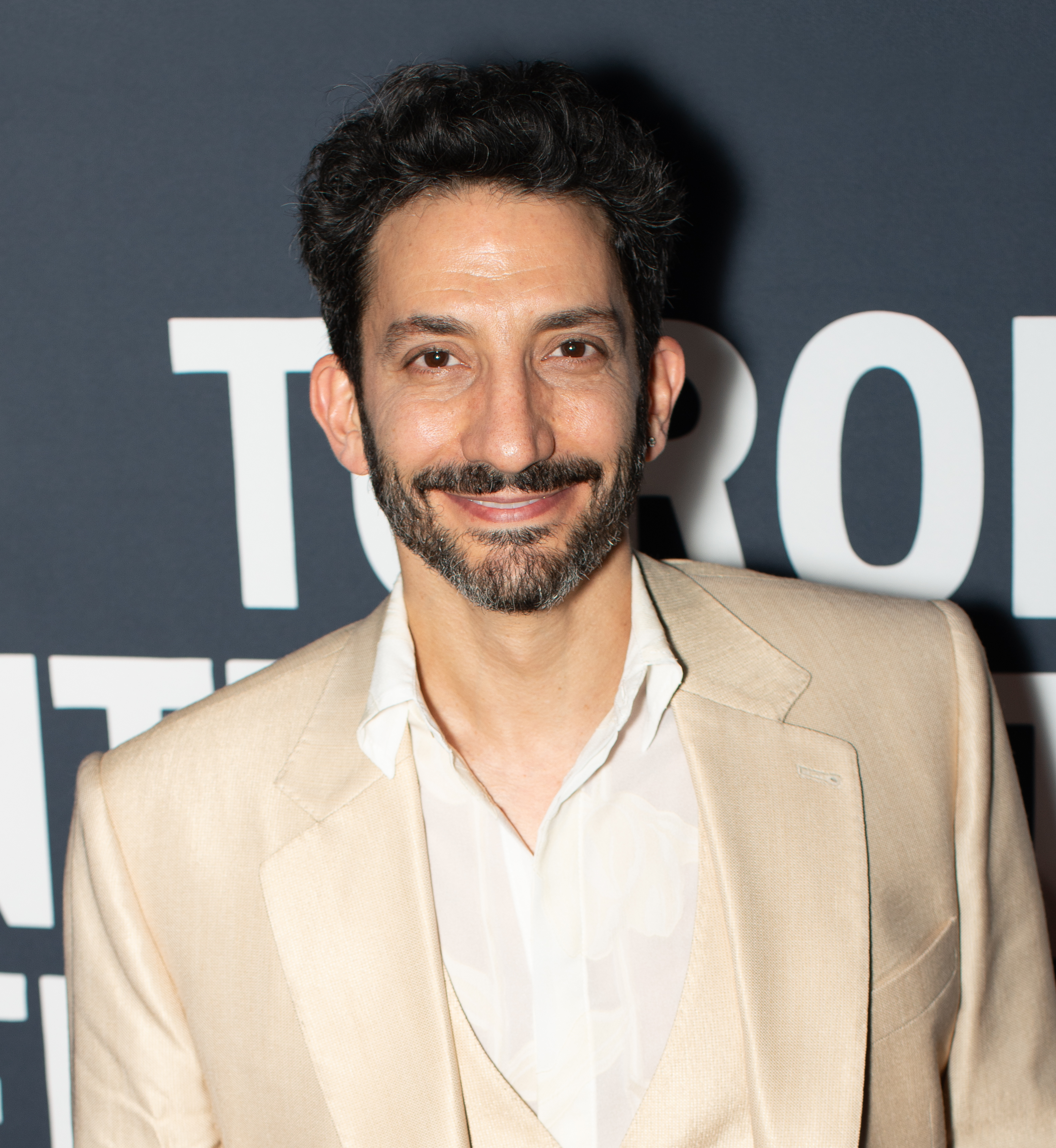
- Juan Minujín at the 2024 Toronto International Film Festival
- Born: Juan Gervasio Minujín; May 20, 1975 (age 50); Buenos Aires, Argentina
- Occupations: Actor and film director
- Years active: 1994–present
- Spouse: Laura (2003–present)
- Children: Amanda Minujín; Carmela Minujín
- Relatives: Marta Minujín (Aunt)
- Website: www.juanminujin.com

Juan Gervasio Minujín (born May 20, 1975) is an Argentine actor and film director. He is the nephew of plastic artist Marta Minujín.

== Career ==
Juan Minujín began his training as an actor with Cristina Banegas, Alberto Ure, Pompeyo Audivert, Julio Chávez and Guillermo Angelelli. In 1996, he began to work in the theatre. Between 1997 and 1998, Minujín moved to London, where he completed his artistic training.

Since the 2000s, he has been part of the acting troupe El Descueve, with which he has acted in theatrical tours Latin America and Europe.

His rise to fame came thanks to his supporting role in the tv comedy series Solamente vos (2013-2014) on El Trece, in which he played Félix, Aurora's partner, the lead role being played by Natalia Oreiro. Later, he joined the cast of the telenovela Viudas e hijos del rock and roll (2014-2015) on Telefe, in which he played Segundo Arostegui, a successful policeman and patriarch that hid his homosexuality all his life. Shortly after, Minujín was chosen to act in the prison drama El marginal (2016-2022), in which he played 'Pastor', an ex-police officer who is put in prison in order to complete a mission. Through this role, Minujín acquired international attention and both critical praise and public recognition. In 2017, he appeared in a supporting role in the historical drama Zama, directed by Lucrecia Martel.

Later, Minujín co-starred in the comedy drama telenovela100 días para enamorarse (2018) on Telefe, in which he played the lawyer Gastón Guevara. In 2019, he shared the screen with Anthony Hopkins and Jonathan Pryce in the biopic by Netflix, The Two Popes directed by Fernando Meirelles, in which Minujín played Jorge Mario Bergoglio, later Pope Francis during his youth. In 2022, Minujín starred in the independent drama The Substitute by Diego Lerman. That same year, he starred alongside Diego Peretti and Macarena Achaga in the thriller La ira de Dios released on Netflix. In 2023, he appeared in the music video for the song 'Obsesión' by Lali.

== Filmography ==
=== Movies ===
Year	Movie	Character	Director	Notes
1994	Fuego gris		Pablo César	
1995	Comix, cuentos de amor, de video y de muerte		Jorge Coscia	
1996	Ayer fui al cine con Marta y no entendí nada			Short film
1997	Quereme así (Piantao)		Eliseo Álvarez	
2004	Lost Embrace		Daniel Hendler	
2004	La misión	Juan Soria		Medium-length film
2005	A Year Without Love	Pablo Pérez	Anahí Berneri	
2005	Stephanie			
2006	Sofacama	Denis		
2007	Ciudad en celo	Sebastián	Hernán Gaffet	
2007	El cielo elegido	Pablo		
2007	Guacho	Young Minujín	Juan Minujín	Short film and Director
2008	Historias extraordinarias	Narrator	Mariano Llinás	
2008	Lamb of God	Paco	Lucía Cedrón	
2009	Toda la gente sola		Santiago Giralt	
2009	Zenitram	Rubén Martínez/Zenitram		
2010	Eva & Lola	Lucas	Sabrina Farji	
2011	Vaquero		Juan Minujín	Director
2012	2+2	Richard	Diego Kaplan	
2012	Ni un hombre más	Ricky		
2015	Focus	Marcello	Glenn Ficarra and John Requa	
2015	Pistas para volver a casa	Pascual	Jazmín Stuart	
2017	Los que aman, odian	Atuel	Alejandro Maci	
2017	Zama	Ventura Prieto	Lucrecia Martel	
2017	Los últimos románticos	El Perro	Gabriel Drak	
2018	El amor menos pensado	Anselmo	Juan Vera	
2018	Recreo	Mariano	Hernán Guerschuny and Jazmín Stuart	
2019	The Two Popes	Young Jorge Mario Bergoglio	Fernando Meirelles	
2019	Las buenas intenciones	Guillermo		
2022	The Substitute	Lucio	Diego Lerman	
2024	Without Blood	Salinas	Angelina Jolie	
2025	Sundays		Alauda Ruiz de Azúa	

=== Television ===
Year	Title	Character	Channel
2003	Son amores	Mauro	Canal 13
2005	Teikirisi		Telefe
2006	Al límite	Jerry	Telefe
2006	Mujeres asesinas		Canal 13
2007	9mm, crímenes a la medida de la historia	Octavio	Canal de la Ciudad
2009	Epitafios	Mariano Lagos	Canal 13/HBO
2009	Tratame bien	Mauricio Ríos	Canal 13
2010	Ciega a citas	Ángel Carrizo	TV Pública
2011	Los únicos	Hassan Mavarek	Canal 13
2012-2013	Tiempos compulsivos	Ezequiel Lambert	Canal 13
2013-2014	Solamente vos	Félix Month	Canal 13
2014-2015	Viudas e hijos del Rock and Roll	Segundo Arostegui	Telefe
2016-2019	El marginal	Miguel Palacios/Pastor Osvaldo Peña	TV Pública
2016	La última hora	Franco	TV Pública
2016-2018	Loco por vos	Pablo Wainsten	Telefe
2018	100 días para enamorarse	Gastón Guevara	Telefe
2020	El marginal	Miguel Palacios/Pastor Osvaldo Peña	TV Pública

=== Theater ===
- Venus en piel - Dir. Javier Daulte
- El principio de Arquímedes
- Living-Todos Felices - Dir. Oscar Martínez
- Jardín-Todos Felices - Dir. Oscar Martínez
- Comedor-Todos Felices - Dir. Oscar Martínez
- El Pasado es un Animal Grotesco - M. Pensotti
- Sucio - Dir. Ana Frenkel / M. Pensotti
- Cuchillos en gallinas Dir. A. Tantanian
- Rebenque Show
- Vapor - Dir. Mariano Pensotti
- Conferencia - Dir. Martin Bauer
- El Malogrado - Dir. Martin Bauer
- Hermosura - Europe Tour
- Patito Feo - With the group El Descueve
- Hermosura - With the group El Descueve
- El pasajero del barco del sol
- Espumantes
- Edipo Rey de Hungría
- Luna - Dir. Marcelo Katz
- Las Troyanas
- Hamlet
- La Funerala
- Nada & Ave
- La Verdad

=== Videoclips ===
Year	Artist	Song	Director
2012	Calle 13	La vuelta al mundo	Juan José Campanella
2015	La Taza Calva	Viernes	
2018	Martina Stoessel and Cali y El Dandee	Por Que Te Vas	

== Awards and nominations ==
Year	Award	Category	Work	Result	Ref.
2006	Silver Condor Awards	Male Revelation	Un año sin amor	Nominated	
2008	Sur Awards	Best Supporting Actor	Lamb of God	Winner	
2009	Silver Condor Awards	Best Supporting Actor	Lamb of God	Nominated	
2011	Sur Awards	Best Opera Premium	Vaquero	Nominated	
2012	Silver Condor Awards	Best Opera Premium	Vaquero	Nominated	
2012	Sur Awards	Best Supporting Actor	2+2	Nominated	
2012	Tato Awards	Best Supporting Actor in Unitary	Tiempos compulsivos	Nominated	
2013	Silver Condor Awards	Best Supporting Actor	2+2	Nominated	
2013	Tato Awards	Best Supporting Actor	Solamente vos	Winner	
2014	Martín Fierro Awards	Best Supporting Actor	Solamente vos	Nominated	
2015	Martín Fierro Awards	Best Daily Fiction Actor	Viudas e hijos del Rock and Roll	Winner	
2016	Tato Awards	Best Leading Actor in Drama	El marginal	Winner	
2016	Tato Awards	Best Leading Actor in Comedy	Loco por vos	Nominated	
2017	Martín Fierro Awards	Best Miniseries Actor	El marginal	Nominated	
2019	Martín Fierro Awards	Best Daily Fiction Actor	100 días para enamorarse	Winner	
2026	81st CEC Medals	Best Supporting Actor	Sundays	Nominated	
2026	40th Goya Awards	Best Supporting Actor	Sundays	Pending	
2026	13th Platino Awards	Best Supporting Actor	Sundays	Pending	
