= I Never Been in Vienna =

1989 film

- Directed by: Antonio Larreta
- Written by: Antonio Larreta
- Produced by: Paco Molero
- Starring: China Zorrilla
- Cinematography: Ricardo Aronovich
- Edited by: Luis Mutti
- Music by: José Nieto
- Release date: 13 April 1989
- Running time: 100 minutes
- Country: Argentina
- Language: Spanish

I Never Been in Vienna (Spanish: Nunca estuve en Viena) is a 1989 Argentine drama film directed by Antonio Larreta. It was entered into the 16th Moscow International Film Festival.

== Summary ==
The story revolves around an upper-class family during the Centennial of the May Revolution, a period marked by the waning influence of the aristocratic classes. Set against the backdrop of societal transformation, four siblings find themselves living under the watchful eye of their strict grandmother, who embodies an authoritarian figure. Through their experiences, the siblings grapple with the challenges and implications of the emerging egalitarian and social changes in this new era.

== Cast ==
- China Zorrilla as Carlota
- Sergi Mateu as José
- Alberto Segado as Marcelo
- María Teresa Costantini as Adela
- Víctor Laplace as Francisco
- Chunchuna Villafañe as Carolina
- Mercedes Morán as Eugenio
- Hugo Soto as Augusto
- Marcelo Alfaro as Juan Ignacio
- Ricardo Beiro as Hipolito
- Sofía Viruboff as Maria Antonio
- Ofelia Morixe as Carmen
