= Your Life for Perón =

- Spanish: La vida por Perón
- Directed by: Sergio Bellotti
- Cinematography: Hernán Baigorria
- Release dates: September 2004 (San Sebastián Film Festival); June 30, 2005 (Argentina)
- Country: Argentina
- Language: Spanish

Your Life for Perón (Spanish: La Vida por Perón) is a 2005 Argentine film directed by Sergio Bellotti and starring Belén Blanco, Cristina Banegas, Esteban Lamothe, Luis Ziembrowski, Oscar Alegre, and Jean Pierre Reguerraz.

== Plot ==
In the political chaos of Argentina during the final days of Juan Domingo Perón's presidency, a gang of political operatives arrives at the house of Cosme (Reguerraz), a member of the Peronist Youth. Cosme's father has just died of a heart attack and the family is holding a vigil. The gang reveals that Perón has died, news that has not yet reached the public. Their leader, Aldo (Alegre) slowly works on building up Cosme's political fervor, before demanding a favor: they want to swap Perón's body, which they have stolen, with the body of Cosme's father. The idea is to make sure the military authorities never learn about the theft, and to keep Perón's body for themselves as a shrine. Their scheme unravels when Cosme eventually collects the courage to refuse to participate, and the gang is then busted by the police, with Aldo and the rest perishing in a gunfight.

Similar themes were addressed in the novel Santa Evita by Tomás Eloy Martínez, in which an Army officer is entrusted with the stolen body of Evita Perón, ordered to keep it hidden in order to prevent its becoming a shrine to the Peronist movement.
