= Alma mía =

Alma Mía
- Directed by: Daniel Barone
- Written by: Jorge Leyes; Adrián Suar (idea)
- Produced by: Fernando Blanco; Adrián Suar
- Starring: Araceli González; Pablo Echarri
- Cinematography: Guillermo Zappino
- Edited by: Alejandro Alem; Alejandro Parysow
- Music by: Iván Wyszogrod
- Release date: May 13, 1999 (Argentina)
- Running time: 105 minutes
- Country: Argentina
- Language: Spanish

Alma mía ("My Soul") is a 1999 Argentine romantic comedy film directed by Daniel Barone and written by Jorge Leyes. The film starAraceli González as Alma.

== Plot ==
Alma (Araceli González) is a young pastry chef from the neighborhood of La Boca who has been dating Mario (Diego Peretti) since her teenage years. Leo (Pablo Echarri) is an architect on the verge of getting married. Fanny (Valeria Bertuccelli), a prostitute and a close friend of Alma's, plans a special night with Tano (Damián de Santo) to celebrate Leo's last days as a bachelor. Misled by Fanny, Alma goes to a bar where she unexpectedly encounters both men. Leo mistakenly believes that Alma is a prostitute hired by Tano. After spending a few hours together, Leo and Alma find themselves unable to forget each other.

== Cast ==
- Araceli González .... Alma
- Cristina Allende .... Madre Valeria
- Valeria Bertuccelli .... Fanny
- Héctor Bidonde .... Vito
- Paula Canals .... Tina
- Rita Cortese .... Tita
- Antonella Costa .... Micaela
- Damián de Santo .... El Tano
- Pablo Echarri .... Leo
- Roberto Fiore .... Padre Valeria
- Gabriel Gibot .... Operador de Radio
- Elena Gowland .... Enfermera
- Dulio Orso .... Rubén
- Diego Peretti .... Mario
- Adriana Salonia .... Valeria
- Tony Sánchez Pupa .... Médico
- Rolly Serrano .... Leche Hervida

== Awards ==
In 2000, Valeria Bertuccelli won a Silver Condor Award for Best Actress while Diego Peretti was nominated for Best Actor.
