= Botineras =

- Clockwise from top left: Romina Gaetani, Nicolás Cabré, Gonzalo Valenzuela, Isabel Macedo, Florencia Peña and Damián de Santo
- Genre: Police procedural
- Created by: Sebastián Ortega
- Written by: Esther Feldman; Alejandro Maci; Guillermo Salmerón; Nuri Abramowicz; Alejandro Quesada; Martín Méndez; Rodolfo Cela
- Directed by: Pablo Vasquez; Omar Aiello; Pablo Ambrosini; Diego Sánchez; Negro Luna
- Starring: Nicolás Cabré; Romina Gaetani; Damián de Santo; Gonzalo Valenzuela; Isabel Macedo; Florencia Peña; Roberto Carnaghi; Graciela Pal
- Theme music composer: David Bolzoni
- Opening theme: Las Botineras
- Ending theme: Que hice bien, que hice mal
- Composer: David Bolzoni
- Country of origin: Argentina
- Original language: Spanish
- No. of seasons: 1
- No. of episodes: 142

Production
- Producers: Sebastián Ortega; Leonardo Faggiani; Diego Poggi; Victoria Martínez; Victoria Cianfagna; Cecilia Facian; Rafael de las Carreras; Giovanna Iribarren; Gabriel Aiello; Camila Pascal Boghetier; Vanina Martorilli; Betina Brewda; Pablo Culell
- Running time: 60 minutes
- Production companies: Underground Contenidos; Endemol

Original release
- Network: Telefe
- Release: November 24, 2009 – August 25, 2010

Related
- Vidas robadas; Caín y Abel

Botineras (WAGs: Love for the Game) is an Argentine telenovela produced by Underground Contenidos and Telefe Contenidos in association with Endemol. It starred Nicolás Cabré and Romina Gaetani, with the antagonistic participation of Damián de Santo, Isabel Macedo and Gonzalo Valenzuela. With the special participation of Florencia Peña and the star performances of the first actors, Roberto Carnaghi and Graciela Pal.

It began airing on November 24, 2009, Tuesday through Friday at 11 p.m. (UTC-3), on Telefe. While CQC was on television the series did not air during the summer, it was broadcast Monday through Thursday at that time. As of March 1, 2010, it began broadcasting at 10:30 pm (UTC-3), Monday through Thursday. With the return of CQC on Mondays, it happened again from Tuesday to Friday. From the month of July until its completion, it was broadcast from Tuesday to Thursday.

== Premise ==
Initially, the telenovela was intended to be a comedy about football as botinera translates literally to "a woman that wears a botín", which can mean either high-heeled footwear or a football boot; colloquially it means a footballer's girlfriend or wife. The comedy featured some celebrities from the Argentine football, like football agent Guillermo Cóppola, acting as themselves and the main asset of the comedy was Florencia Peña, who worked in many other successful comedies and helped the show gain modest notoriety.

By January 2010, the telenovela made a genre shift from comedy to police drama, with more emphasis beginning to shift onto Gaetani's and Roberto Carnaghi's characters. The first story arc which changed genre began when Cristian Flores (Cabré) was jailed for some weeks, and following the dramatic genre change, helped the show gain higher ratings than its previous status as a comedy. A lot of characters began a repackaging, with Peña's character reformulated in the process. Her character began by going into bankruptcy and being forced to work for the police. Despite the new approach to the show, Peña announced that she would leave the program because of the changes and she was replaced with Pablo Rago. Rago also departed from the program towards its end, in order to play the lead role in the film Manuel Belgrano and not have conflicting schedules with the show and the movie.

== Plot ==
Cristian "Chiqui" Flores (Nicolás Cabré) is a crack of world football that lives in Spain and returns to Argentina to marry his girlfriend, Margarita "Marga" Molinari (Isabel Macedo), But the "Chiqui" also lands with a suspicion, the death of his greatest football rival in that country, mysteriously murdered. Due to this suspicion, the Argentine and Spanish police face an investigation to try to unravel the crime. The person in charge of that task in Argentina is Laura Posse (Romina Gaetani). This policewoman is going to infiltrate the world of football to approach to "Chiqui" and investigate the reality that involves Eduardo "Tato" Marín (Damián de Santo), representative of Cristian "Chiqui" Flores and Nino Paredes (Gonzalo Valenzuela), attorney of Cristian "Chiqui" Flores and Eduardo "Tato" Marín. Giselle López (Florencia Peña), the queen of the botineras, who will prepare her for the mission. Giselle has a modeling agency dedicated to placing girls in the soccer field.

== Reception ==
On the day of the premiere, opposing television broadcaster Channel 13 scheduled a sketch with Francella, Adrian Suar and Tinelli, but "Botineras" had a higher rating, garnering 27.3 against 22.3.

== Cast ==
=== Protagonists ===
- Cristian "Chiqui" Flores (Nicolás Cabré) He is one of the important names in world football, and at the beginning of the series, he plays sports in an important Spanish club. At the top of his career, Chiqui is suspended by an altercation with Andrés Cappa, his football rival in that country. After this event, he decides to return to Argentina, his native country, and thus escape from all the environment related to the murder of Cappa. Seizing the occasion, he returns to Argentina to marry his girlfriend, Marga. Once in his country, at a party held by Tato, he meets someone who catches his attention: Mía Alberdi. After everything that happened, he ends up going to Europe with his daughter to solve procedures and return later to Argentina to finish his career. He proposes to Laura to go for coffee when he returns.
- Laura Posse (Romina Gaetani) She is a police force detective in which her parents also worked. He fell in love with Chiqui when he began investigating him, with whom he had a short affair. She is rigorous with her work, so she does not rely on her eagerness to put all criminals behind bars. To investigate the murder in which Cristian Flores is involved, she will impersonate the Mía Alberdi botinera and try to collect more clues for the investigation. After seeing that a relationship with the Chiqui was almost impossible, he brides with Salgado. Actually, Laura is Arregui's daughter. Finally, she ends up putting Nino behind bars after a violent fight, and happens to Riganti at the headquarters of the department. She stays with Chiqui, when he returns from Spain, to go for coffee.

=== Co-protagonists ===
- Giselle López (Florencia Peña) She is an expert woman and a football lover, a former partner of Tato Marín, friendly, extremely professional, and ambitious, under the motto of "vale todo". He has a modeling agency that pursues the goal of turning girls into booties, so that they conquer players, marry them and gain their fortunes. Madam times. Giselle is murdered, but it is not known who was the perpetrator, and initially there are three possible suspects with three different causes: Nino, Tato and Lalo. Apparently, none of the suspects named above was Giselle's real murderer, it turns out to be Marga, a woman from Chiqui Flores, the cause was because Giselle threatened Marga in telling Chiqui the relationship she had previously with Nino.
- Javier Salgado (Pablo Rago) He is an inspector who comes from the internal affairs section to oversee Arregui's work, but ends up falling in love with Laura. He is the father of Malena. He discovers that Nino was not dead, chases him and after he points a gun at him, he disappears. Nino killed him while recording a message for Laura and Malena.
- Adrián "Anguila" Muñiz (Tomás Fonzi) He is the best friend of Cristian Flores and, like him, he triumphed in a club in Spain. However, some time later, he had to return to Argentina because of an injury. Currently, he stands out at the El Cristal Sports Club. He has a close relationship with Catalina, for whom he begins to feel a strong attraction; but she decides to go to Venezuela after Giselle's death. Finally, Anguilla ends up falling in love with Mercedes and marries her.
- Catalina Bellagamba (Lola Berthet) She is the assistant and best friend of Giselle, who is dedicated to finding information to cross footballers with women. She falls in love with Anguilla but, after Giselle's murder, she goes to work in Venezuela.
- Walter Vázquez (Rodrigo Guirao Díaz) This is another football crack, simple, naive and in love with his teenage girlfriend. He shares a squad with Anguilla Muñiz and is a fan of "The Simpsons" and homemade food. He is in love with Solange. When she dies, Tato and Nino pay him a trip to make him disappear.
- Vanina Etchegoyen (Jennifer Williams) She is the icon of aspiring botineras and an unavoidable reference for those who want to start in that world. In addition, it was the revelation in the last World Cup, because of her sculptural figure and overwhelming personality. She died when Lalo, by accident, hit her with Anguilla's car.
- Gonzalo "Lalo" Roldán (Ezequiel Castaño) He is the cousin of Cristian Flores. He plays at the El Cristal Sports Club, but he had a bad debut, so everyone started to despise him. He killed Vanina when he reversed Anguilla's car, being drunk. He was one of the three alleged murderers of Giselle López, due to the bad relationship he had with her since he murdered Vanina. He has a secret homosexual relationship with his partner Manuel "Flaco" Riveiro. He was another of Mirta's alleged murderers, since she, after seeing him and Skinny Riveiro kissing, intended to publish it, also blaming him for the murder of Giselle. Then, Tato takes revenge by instructing Mustard to break his legs so he doesn't play football anymore. He ends up as a boyfriend with El Flaco, after realizing that he was the love of his life.
- Humberto Arregui (Roberto Carnaghi) He is the head of the Departmental Research Department, an intelligent, principled man, and a lover of cooking and good wine. He is replaced by Emma Riganti, being retired early, because his way of working was considered irregular. However, he continues to work actively on cases, out of force. He is Laura's biological father. He manages to conquer Riganti and they end up as a couple.
- Mono (Luciano Cáceres) He is the bodyguard of Chiqui Flores.
- Marcos Ibarra (Maximiliano Ghione) He is a police journalist of an important national newspaper that closely follows the alleged guilt of Chiqui in the murder of Andrés Cappa. In addition, he is Laura's ex-husband. He discovered this by maintaining relationships with another woman, which is why the divorce occurred. He was killed by Nino when he tried to extort him.
- Manuel "Flaco" Riveiro (Christian Sancho) He is a footballer who started playing with Chiqui Flores and Anguilla at the El Cristal Sports Club. From there he was transferred to Europe, where he passed through Italy and Spain. He is married to Lili, and they have two children. He maintains a double life, since he is a repressed homosexual and is attracted to Lalo, getting to kiss him and starting a sentimental relationship in the strip. He was another one of Mirta's alleged murderers, since she was going to publish her relationship with Lalo, then Tato retaliated by believing he was drugged in the last game. After Lalo assumed things were happening to him, they end up together.
- Fernando Rodríguez (Lucas Ferraro) He is one of the police force agents that Arregui commands. He works with Laura and Torres, among his main colleagues. He is expelled from the force after the police discovered that he had put false evidence against Tato, to prevent Arregui from being removed from office. After a period imprisoned for it, he continues to work in the investigation, but outside the department. He is in love with Malena, and ends up as a boyfriend with her.
- Omar Torres (Alan Sabbagh) He is another of the police force agents headed by Humberto Arregui. Among her main partners, are Laura and Fernando. He knows from the past a suspect in the world they are investigating, Román, although he does not know initially. He is usually scolded by Emma Riganti, the new head of the force, either for the clothes he wears or for always having to cross it.
- Liliana "Lili" Aramburu (Guillermina Valdés) She is married to Flaco Riveiro, with whom she has two children. She is a woman with class and family. She is very close to Marga. She was one of Mirta's possible murderers, because she was going to make the secret of Flaco and Lalo public, something that didn't suit her. She falls in love with Tato until she discovers that he put drugs on the Flaco to take revenge for Mirta's death. She donate the money that Chiqui manages to get Tato to a hospital. She goes to Córdoba to start a new life together with her two children.
- Irma Fonseca/Solange Cuchi (Mariela Vitale) She is a young and aspiring botinera model. She is Giselle's favorite, who considers her her best project. She is in love with Walter. She was killed by Nino upon discovering that she and Tato gave players drugs to improve their physical performance.
- Ethel Molinari (Silvia Pérez) She is the mother of Marga, a former model of the 70s, who has always encouraged her daughter to conquer a footballer to secure her future. She believes that she is superior and predestined to live a life of luxury. She was the first to find out that Marga killed Giselle. She is dating GG, an elderly millionaire, of whom she is only interested in money. She tried to make the police believe that she had killed Mirta, to save her daughter. Finally, she accompanied her daughter throughout her pregnancy, and ends up taking care of her when she is in prison.
- Mirta Rubinstein (Graciela Pal) She is like a mother to Tato, since she saw him grow up and now lives at home, working on housework. She confirms that he murdered Giselle López. Days later, he commits suicide. But all this was to save Tato, who had been arrested as the main suspect. However, it is later revealed that Mirta was killed. There are four suspects: Lili, Lalo, Flaco Riveiro and Nino. After the discovery that Marga killed Giselle, she and her mother are investigated to find out who killed both Mirta and Giselle, finally, it is discovered that it was Marga.
- Paul (Diego Reinhold) He is the stylist of the agency of Giselle, and his job is to work the look of the booties that want to conquer footballers. Because of its aristocratic cradle, it has exquisite manners, even when it has a fun and sparkling personality. He went to live in Europe working for the model Nicole Neumann.

=== Antagonists ===
- Eduardo "Tato" Marín (Damián de Santo) He is the representative of Flores, an ambitious and manipulative man who lives outside the law. His ambition has no limits, and is capable of anything to stay high and earn money. Initially, he feels attracted to Laura. He was the intellectual author of the murder of the father of Chiqui. He was also one of the three alleged murderers of Giselle López, since he had arranged an appointment with her when he learned that she was a police spy, and seeing that she did not appear, he went to look for her. Tato suffered greatly from the death of Mirta. He dated Sofía until she was imprisoned. Finally, he manages to escape from the police and ends up in Paraguay, with a totally different identity and starting his previous life there again.
- Nino Paredes (Gonzalo Valenzuela) He is an attractive young man, womanizer and single, coveted by girls who seek fast fame. He is the lawyer of Tato Marín, who follows sun and shadow. In addition, he is a born seducer and an inveterate womanizer. Their objectives, in general, are women who seek their "fifteen minutes of fame." He killed Andrés Cappa, Solange Cuchi, Marcos Ibarra, Giselle Martino, Román Lamas and Javier Salgado. He was one of the three alleged murderers of Giselle López, as she found him with Marga having sex, and learned that the son she expected was supposedly from him. After finding out that he would receive an arrest warrant for the murder of Solange Cuchi, he begins to take hostages at Tato's house, and prepares to kill Marga, but the Chiqui, in a very tense situation, shoots him first and murders to Nino. But in reality, Nino is alive, and is looking for the moment to kill Marga and avenge the death of Giselle, his great love. He takes refuge in the house of a strange woman, also called Giselle. He kidnapped Salgado when the latter learned that he was alive. In addition, he is one of the four suspects of Mirta's death, since he wanted revenge on Tato because at that moment everything indicated that he had killed Giselle. He ends up imprisoned in life imprisonment after all his crimes.
- Margarita "Marga" Molinari (Isabel Macedo) She is the Botinera girlfriend of Cristian Flores, a fame seeker, obsessive and addicted to shopping, who has no plans to lose the bond she has with her husband. Supposedly pregnant with Nino, he makes the Chiqui believe that he expects a child of his to avoid divorce. However, finally the son was from Chiqui. Marga tells the Chiqui, while he was asleep and speaking to herself, that she had been the murderer of Giselle López. Later, Nino realizes the truth and tries to kill Marga by hitting her. She survives, but loses her baby. It is discovered that he also killed Mirta. After having her daughter, she ends up in prison for the crimes of Giselle López and Mirta Rubinstein. She asks Chiqui to please never see her again, she gives him a letter to give to her daughter when she turns 15 and they say goodbye forever.
