= Refugiado =

- Film poster
- Directed by: Diego Lerman
- Starring: Julieta Díaz; Sebastián Molinaro; Marta Lubos
- Cinematography: Wojciech Staroń
- Release date: 30 October 2014 (Argentina)
- Running time: 90 minutes
- Country: Argentina
- Language: Spanish

Refugiado (lit. 'Refugee') is a 2014 Argentine film directed by Diego Lerman and starring Julieta Díaz, Sebastián Molinaro, and Marta Lubos.

== Accolades ==
Award / Film Festival	Category	Recipient(s)	Result
Academy of Motion Picture Arts and Sciences of Argentina	Best Film	Refugiado	Won
Academy of Motion Picture Arts and Sciences of Argentina	Best Director	Diego Lerman	Won
Academy of Motion Picture Arts and Sciences of Argentina	Best Screenplay, Original	Diego Lerman, María Meira	Won
Academy of Motion Picture Arts and Sciences of Argentina	Best Acting	Alejandro Brodersohn	Won
Argentinean Film Critics Association Awards	Best Film	Refugiado	Won
Argentinean Film Critics Association Awards	Best Actress	Julietta Diaz	Won
Argentinean Film Critics Association Awards	Best Screenplay, Original	Diego Lerman, María Meira	Won
International Film Festival of Kerala	Suvarna Chakoram (Best Film)	Refugiado	Won
Chicago International Film Festival	Special Jury Prize	Diego Lerman	Won
Havana Film Festival	Best Cinematography	Wojciech Staron	Won
Havana Film Festival New York	Best Film	Refugiado	Won
RiverRun International Film Festival	Best Actress	Julietta Diaz	Won
