= El armario =

2001 film by Gustavo Corrado

- Written by: Gustavo Corrado
- Starring: Jean Pierre Reguerraz; Pamela Rementería
- Release date: 3 May 2001
- Running time: 77 minute
- Country: Argentina
- Language: Spanish

El armario (English: The Cupboard) is a 2001 Argentine film directed and written by Gustavo Corrado. The film premiered on 3 May 2001 in Buenos Aires. The film starred Jean Pierre Reguerraz and Pamela Rementería, who was nominated for a Silver Condor Best Actress Award for her performance. Also starring Adolfo Coroa and Lelia Dondoglio.
