= 2+2 (2012 film) =

2012 film by Diego Kaplan

- Theatrical release poster
- Spanish: Dos más dos
- Directed by: Diego Kaplan
- Written by: Juan Vera; Daniel Cúparo
- Produced by: Adrián Suar
- Starring: Adrián Suar; Julieta Díaz; Carla Peterson; Juan Minujín
- Edited by: Pablo Barbieri
- Music by: Iván Wyszogrod
- Production companies: Patagonik Film Group; INCAA; Orlando Films; M y S Producción
- Distributed by: Buena Vista International
- Release date: 16 August 2012
- Running time: 107 minutes
- Country: Argentina
- Language: Spanish
- Box office: $4,520,287

2+2 (Spanish: Dos más dos) is a 2012 Argentine comedy-drama film directed by Diego Kaplan and starring Adrián Suar, Carla Peterson, Julieta Díaz and Juan Minujín. The plot revolves around two successful friendly couples: Diego and Emilia, and Betina and Richard. One night, Richard and Betina reveal to Diego and Emilia that they are swingers and would like to swap partners with them, tempting Emilia.

It was the highest grossing Argentine film in 2012.

== Plot ==
Diego (Adrían Suar) and Richard (Juan Minujín) are two renowned cardiovascular surgeons who own an important specialist hospital located in Puerto Madero, Buenos Aires. Diego is married to Emilia (Julieta Díaz), a weather forecaster, with whom he has a 14-year-old son called Lucas (Tomás Wicz) and an organized family life. Richard is in a ten-year relationship with Betina (Carla Peterson), a fashion designer; they have no children and a more unstructured life.

One night, after Diego and Richard are given a recognition for their work at a congress, the two couples go out and have dinner to celebrate. In the restroom, Betina reveals to Emilia that she and Richard are swingers and that they should go to a swinger party with them. That night, Emilia cannot stop thinking about it and awakens Diego to tell him. In the following days Emilia tries to be more sexually active and urges Diego to go to the party. Although he is uncomfortable with the idea, he accepts.

The party is held in the house of a man named Pablo (Alfredo Casero) because of his birthday. Although Emilia enjoys the party, Diego is shocked and uneasy with everybody's promiscuity and leaves early with her. She then begins to be more open about their sexuality and wants to talk about her fantasies with Diego. Richard, Betina and Emilia insist on swapping partners until Diego agrees. The two couples have dinner and have sex despite Diego's refusal at the beginning. The following morning Emilia cries and tells Diego that she thinks that they "did wrong", but that she feels no regret.

A few months later, Diego and Emilia are used to the swinging lifestyle and are comfortable with it. In Lucas' birthday party, Betina tells Emilia that she thinks Richard is cheating on her and becomes emotionally unstable the following days. It is revealed that Emilia and Richard have been meeting secretly, and one night Emilia tells him she has fallen in love with him and the swinging must end.

One night, Betina violently enters Diego and Emilia's house because she finds out about the affair and the two couples discuss. Diego decides not to be partners with Richard anymore, quitting his job at the hospital. He decides to separate and leaves the house. Meanwhile, Richard apologizes to Betina and begs her to get back together, but she refuses.

Two years later, the two couples, who are back together, coincidentally meet in the cinema. Betina is nearly eight months pregnant and Richard expresses his desire to be friends again with them. They respectfully greet each other and go to see the films.

== Cast ==
- Adrián Suar as Diego
- Carla Peterson as Betina
- Julieta Díaz as Emilia
- Juan Minujín as Richard
- Alfredo Casero as Pablo
- Tomás Wicz as Lucas
- Micaela Cuccaresi as China

== Reception ==
The film received mixed to positive reviews. Most critics praised the performance of the cast. Debate has centered on the conservatism of the ending, while the film was publicized as transgressive.

Catalina Dlugi of Todo Noticias called the film "spicy and funny". La Prensa's Isabel Croce highlighted Julieta Díaz's performance and described the film as "a good comedy starring an attractive foursome". La Capital called Alfredo Casero's role "noteworthy" and wrote "it is a movie with risky events and direct, crude language, but fails to exceed the occurrence of Un novio para mi mujer. La Voz del Interior considered "one of the successes of 2+2 is the choice of the cast" and that it has "very funny moments, risky and very well done erotic scenes, tense situations that give nuance to the story." Página/12's Horacio Bernades described the film as "not only very worthy, technically flawless and very enjoyable, but unusually accomplished and provocative, for the needy Argentine film industry standards."

Julio Nakamurakare of the Buenos Aires Herald called 2+2 "so predictable and narrow-minded as to negate what's been previously proclaimed out loud as a war cry." Javier Porta Fouz of HiperCrítico panned Iván Wyszogrod's musicalization of the film, and described the film as "condescending, awkward, scrawny, besieged by its 'concept of selling'." Función Agotada's Nicolás Viademonte particularly criticized the ending, writing "[Kaplan] gets to throw away in 20 minutes what had been built with very good pulse in 80" and that the last thirty minutes of the movie "lacked the 'revolutionary', fresh, youthful spirit that carried in its starting time."
