= Acrobacias del corazón =

- Directed by: María Teresa Constantini
- Written by: María Teresa Constantini
- Produced by: Donald Rosenfeld
- Starring: María Teresa Constantini; Virginia Innocenti; Gabriel Goity; Cecilia Dopazo; Alejandro Awada; Antonio Grimau
- Cinematography: Marcelo Camorino
- Edited by: Laura Bua
- Music by: Leo Sujatovich
- Distributed by: Buenos Aires Producciones S.A.
- Release date: 13 April 2000
- Running time: 98 minutes
- Country: Argentina
- Language: Spanish

Acrobacias del corazón (English language: Acrobatics of the Heart) is a 2000 Argentine romantic drama film directed, written by and starring María Teresa Constantini. Gabriel Goity and Virginia Innocenti also star.

== Release and acclaim ==
The film premiered on 13 April 2000 in Buenos Aires. It was produced by Buenos Aires Producciones S.A. and distributed by the company although Argentina Video Home are acclaimed for its VHS and DVD release.

== Cast ==
- María Teresa Constantini as Marisa
- Virginia Innocenti as Lola
- Gabriel Goity as Jorge
- Cecilia Dopazo as Lucía
- Alejandro Awada as Rafael
- Antonio Grimau as Emilio
- Silvia Baylé as María
- Pablo Ini
- Silvana Sosto
