= Ay Juancito =

- Theatrical Poster
- Directed by: Héctor Olivera
- Written by: Héctor Olivera; José Pablo Feinmann
- Produced by: Dolores Bengolea; Maricel Lozano
- Starring: Adrián Navarro; Inés Estévez; Leticia Brédice; Jorge Marrale
- Cinematography: Willi Behnisch
- Edited by: Miguel Pérez
- Music by: Osvaldo Montes
- Release date: June 10, 2004
- Running time: 115 min.
- Country: Argentina
- Language: Spanish
- Budget: $2,800,000
- Box office: $17,159,458

Ay Juancito is a 2004 Argentine biographical drama film directed by Héctor Olivera. It was written by Olivera and José Pablo Feinmann, and stars Adrián Navarro, Inés Estévez, and Leticia Brédice.

== Synopsis ==
The film is about the life of Juan Duarte, Eva Perón's brother and a political officer during Juan Domingo Perón's first presidency.

== Exhibition ==
The film opened wide in Argentina on June 10, 2004. It was later screened at a few film festivals, including the Cairo International Film Festival in Egypt and the Cannes Film Market in France.

== Cast ==
- Adrián Navarro as Juan Duarte
- Inés Estévez as Alicia Dupont
- Leticia Brédice as Yvonne Pascal
- Norma Aleandro as Doña Juana
- Jorge Marrale as Juan Perón
- Norberto Arcusín as Actor in Niní Marshall's film
- Alejandro Awada as Héctor Cámpora
- Victoría Bargues as Herminia Duarte
- Silvina Boye as Secretaria Perón
- Marcelo Bucossi as Productor de Cine
- Carlos Cardone as Luis César Amadori
- Alfredo Cernadas as Traductor Inglés
- Oscar Cisterna as Ordenanza
- Hugo de Bruna as Abuelo Obra de Teatro
- Luis Ferreyra as Chofer de Juancito
- Celina Font as Julia Lobos
- Laura Novoa as Evita Perón

== Awards ==
Wins

- Cairo International Film Festival: Best Actor, Adrián Navarro; Best Director, Héctor Olivera; 2004.
- Clarin Entertainment Awards: Clarin Award Best New Film Actor, Adrián Navarro; 2004.
- Argentine Film Critics Association Awards: Silver Condor Best Costume Design, Horace Lannes; Best New Actor, Adrián Navarro; 2005.
