= María Izquierdo (actress) =

Chilean actress

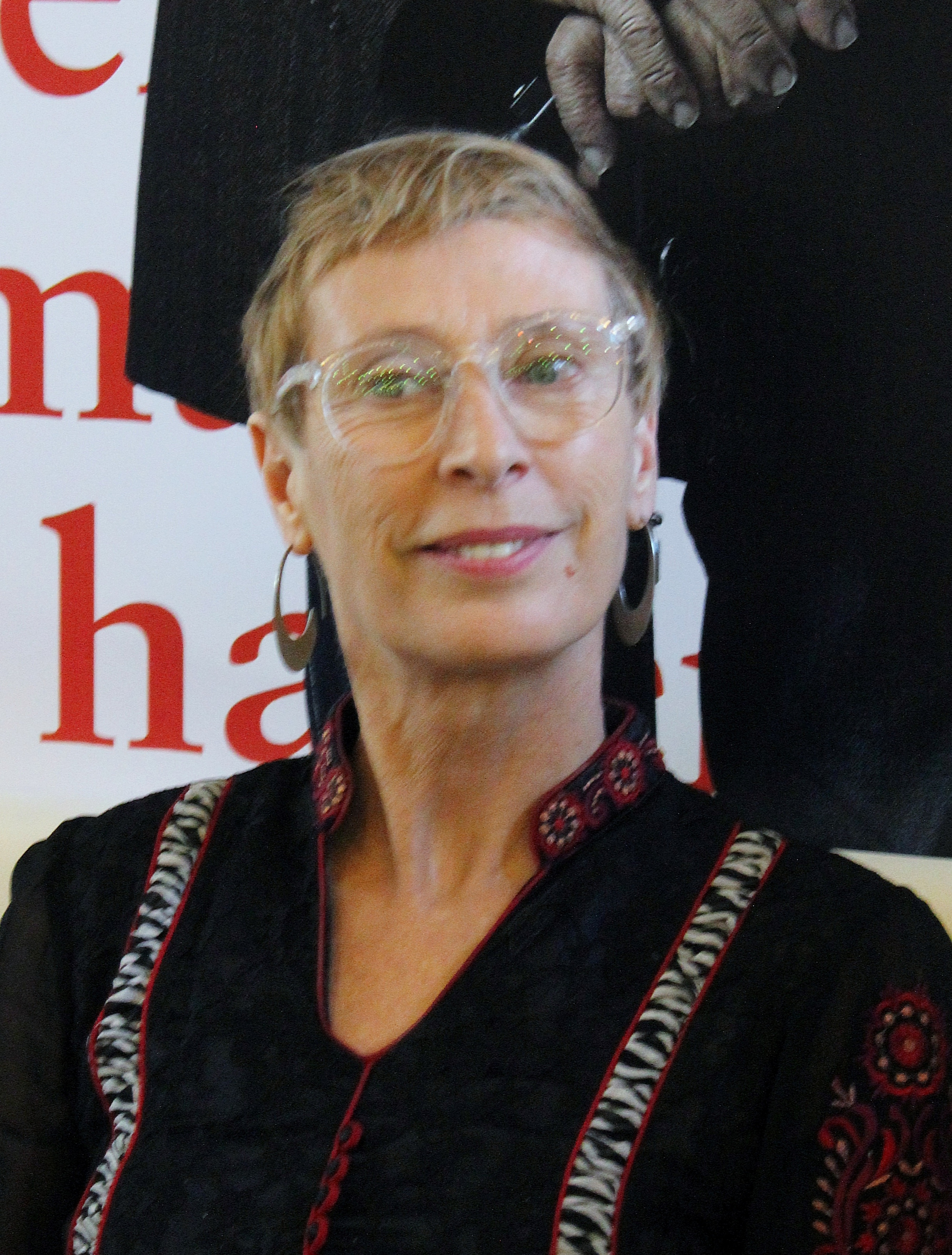
- María Izquierdo in 2018
- Born: 15 December 1960 (age 65); Santiago, Chile
- Occupation: Actress
- Years active: 1978-present

Ana María Izquierdo Huneeus (born 15 December 1960) is a Chilean actress. She appeared in more than fifty films since 1978.

== Biography ==
Her father, Luis Izquierdo, was a doctor who was dedicated to scientific research, and her mother, Teresa Huneeus Cox, was a psychologist. She is the granddaughter of the writer Virginia Cox Balmaceda, and niece of the writer Pablo Huneeus Cox.

She studied at the La Girouette School in Las Condes and later at the Theater School of the University of Chile. She graduated in 1980 and made her professional debut the following year in the play Berlin 1930, under the direction of Eugenio Guzmán. She then participated in Alejandro Sieveking's La Remienda, and in Alicia or the Wonders She Saw in the Country, a collective creation directed by Andrés Pérez.

In 1983, she moved to the United States where she stayed until the following year working at the American Repertory Theater in Boston, and with Bread and Puppet Theater in Vermont and New York.

== Selected filmography ==
Year	Title	Role	Notes
2001	La Fiebre del Loco		
2003	Sex with Love	Maca	
2006	Fuga		
2008	Lamb of God		
2013	The Summer of Flying Fish	Teresa	

== Recognition ==
In 2018, she was recognized by the Atacama Cultural Center.
