= Soy gitano =

- Genre: Telenovela
- Created by: Adrián Suar
- Written by: Marcos Carnevale; Marcela Guerty
- Directed by: Jorge Nisco; Sebastián Pivotto
- Starring: Osvaldo Laport; Arnaldo André; Juan Darthés; Julieta Díaz; Romina Gaetani; Valentina Bassi; Betiana Blum; Malena Solda; Antonio Grimau
- Opening theme: Mi Religión by Javier Calamaro
- Country of origin: Argentina
- Original language: Spanish
- No. of episodes: 252

Production
- Executive producer: Adrián González
- Producers: Diego Carabelli; Julieta Martinelli
- Production locations: Argentina, Buenos Aires
- Cinematography: Jorge Fernández
- Editors: Alejandro Alem; Alejandro Parysow
- Running time: 60 minutes

Original release
- Network: Canal 13
- Release: January 13, 2003 – 2004

Related
- Padre Coraje

Soy gitano (I Am Gypsy) is a Spanish language television drama from Argentina.

== Cast ==
- Osvaldo Laport as Amador Heredia - Brother of Lázaro, Josemi, and Maite, in love with Mora, then with Isabel
- Arnaldo André as Lázaro Jesús Heredia - Eldest brother of Amador, Josemi, and Maite, father of Isabel
- Juan Darthés as José Miguel 'Josemi' Heredia - Brother of Lázaro, Amador, and Maite, in love with Mora
- Julieta Díaz as Mora Amaya - Daughter of Jano, sister of Ángel, and 'El Niño', in love with Amador, then with Josemi
- Romina Gaetani as Isabel Salvatori - Daughter of Alba and Lázaro, in love with Amador
- Valentina Bassias Luz Reyes - Wife of Ángel
- Jorge Baldini as Diego Valdez Isabel's cousin, loves Brenda then Luz, Hates Angel and Sacho, has problems with them, and he does not like Gypsies.
- Betiana Blum as Alba Esther Soto - Mother of Isabel, sister of Amparo
- Malena Solda as Maite Heredia - Sister of Lázaro, Amador, and Josemi, in love with 'El Niño'
- Antonio Grimau as Jano F. Amaya - Father of Ángel, Mora, and 'El Niño', in love with Amparo
- Joaquín Furriel as Rafael 'El Niño' Amaya - Son of Jano, brother of Ángel, and Mora, in love with Maite
- Maximiliano Ghione as Silverio Soto - Nephew of Amparo and Alba
- Luis Ziembrowski as Sacho - Worker of the Amaya's family
- Toti Ciliberto as Walter Marcelo Barraza 'Tomate' - Husband of Vanina
- Eugenia Guerty as Vanina Judith Trunsky - Friend of Isabel, wife of 'Tomate'
- Luisina Brando as Amparo Jorgelina Soto - Wife of Lázaro, sister of Alba, in love with Jano
