= Loco por vos =

- Also known as: Loco x vos
- Genre: Sitcom
- Created by: Paul Reiser; Danny Jacobson
- Starring: Juan Minujín; Julieta Zylberberg; Fernán Mirás; Marina Bellati; Agustina Lecouna; Damián Dreizik; Gino Renni; Adriana Aizemberg; Manuel Vicente; Luz Palarzón; Lucía Rivera Bonet; Nancy Gay; Fabián Minelli; Gonzalo Suárez; Pichu Straneo
- Theme music composer: César "Banana" Pueyrredón
- Opening theme: "Cuando amas a alguien"
- Composer: César "Banana" Pueyrredón
- Country of origin: Argentina
- Original language: Spanish
- No. of seasons: 2
- No. of episodes: 100 (list of episodes)

Production
- Executive producers: Daniel Cuparo; Lily Ann Martin
- Producer: Negro Luna
- Running time: 30 minutes
- Production companies: Telefe; Sony Pictures Entertainment

Original release
- Network: Telefe
- Release: September 5 – December 29, 2016

Loco por vos (translated as Crazy About You and stylized as Loco x Vos) is an Argentine sitcom, remake of the American series Mad About You. The series stars Juan Minujín, Julieta Zylberberg, Gino Renni, Adriana Aizemberg, Agustina Lecouna, Luis Machín, Fernán Mirás, Marina Bellati, Damián Dreizik, Luz Palarzón and Nancy Gay.

== Plot ==
Pablo (Juan Minujín), a documentary filmmaker, and Natalia (Julieta Zylberberg), a public relations specialist, are a newly married couple who live a story of encounters, whose members must adapt to living, support their respective hobbies, try occupationally consolidate and at the same time, strengthen their bond to be a family.

== Cast ==
=== Main ===
- Juan Minujín as Pablo Wainstein
- Julieta Zylberberg as Natalia "Nati" Armendaris of Wainstein
- Fernán Mirás as Martín "Tincho"
- Marina Bellati as Julia Bertolo
- Agustina Lecouna as Verónica "Vero" Armendaris
- Damián Dreizik as Marcos Bertolo
- Pérez as Pérez

=== Recurring ===
- Gino Renni as Samuel Wainstein
- Adriana Aizemberg as Sara Abramowitz of Wainstein
- Manuel Vicente as Atilio Armendaris
- Luz Palarzón as Celia Armendaris
- Lucía Rivera Bonet as Vicky
- Nancy Gay as Úrsula
- Fabián Minelli as Hugo
- Gonzalo Suárez as Andrés
- Pichu Straneo as Alcides

=== Guest stars ===
- Noelia Marzol as Herself
- Nicole Neumann as Herself
- Fabián Cubero as Himself
- Ivana Nadal as Margarita
- José María Muscari as Benito
- Sergio "Maravilla" Martínez as Marcial
- Sofía Elliot as Employee of Samuel
- Ana Katz as Débora Wainstein
- Mariana Chaud as Elena
- Chang Sung Kim as Chang
- Sebastián Presta as Pedro
- Leandro "Chino" Leunis as Humberto Hurón

== Series overview ==
Season	Episodes	Originally released	
Season	Episodes	First released	Last released
1	66	September 5, 2016	December 30, 2016
2	34	June 17, 2022	June 17, 2022
