= Maradona, the Hand of God =

- Directed by: Marco Risi
- Written by: Manuel Valdivia; Manuel Ríos San Martín; César Vidal Gil
- Music by: Pivio and Aldo De Scalzi
- Release date: 2007
- Countries: Argentina; Italy

Maradona - La mano de Dios, internationally released as Maradona, the Hand of God, is a 2007 Italian-Argentine biographical film directed by Marco Risi. It is based on real life events of footballer Diego Maradona.

== Production ==
The film was announced in 2005.

== Critical reaction ==
Italian website Freequency gave it 3/5 stars.

== Cast ==
- Marco Leonardi: Diego Armando Maradona (adult)
- Abel Ayala: Diego Armando Maradona (adolescent)
- Gonzalo Alarcon: Diego Armando Maradona (child)
- Julieta Díaz: Claudia Villafañe de Maradona
- Juan Leyrado: Guillermo Coppola
- Roly Serrano: Chitoro
- Pietro Taricone: Gianni

== See also ==
- The hand of God
