= Gabriel Goity =

Argentine actor

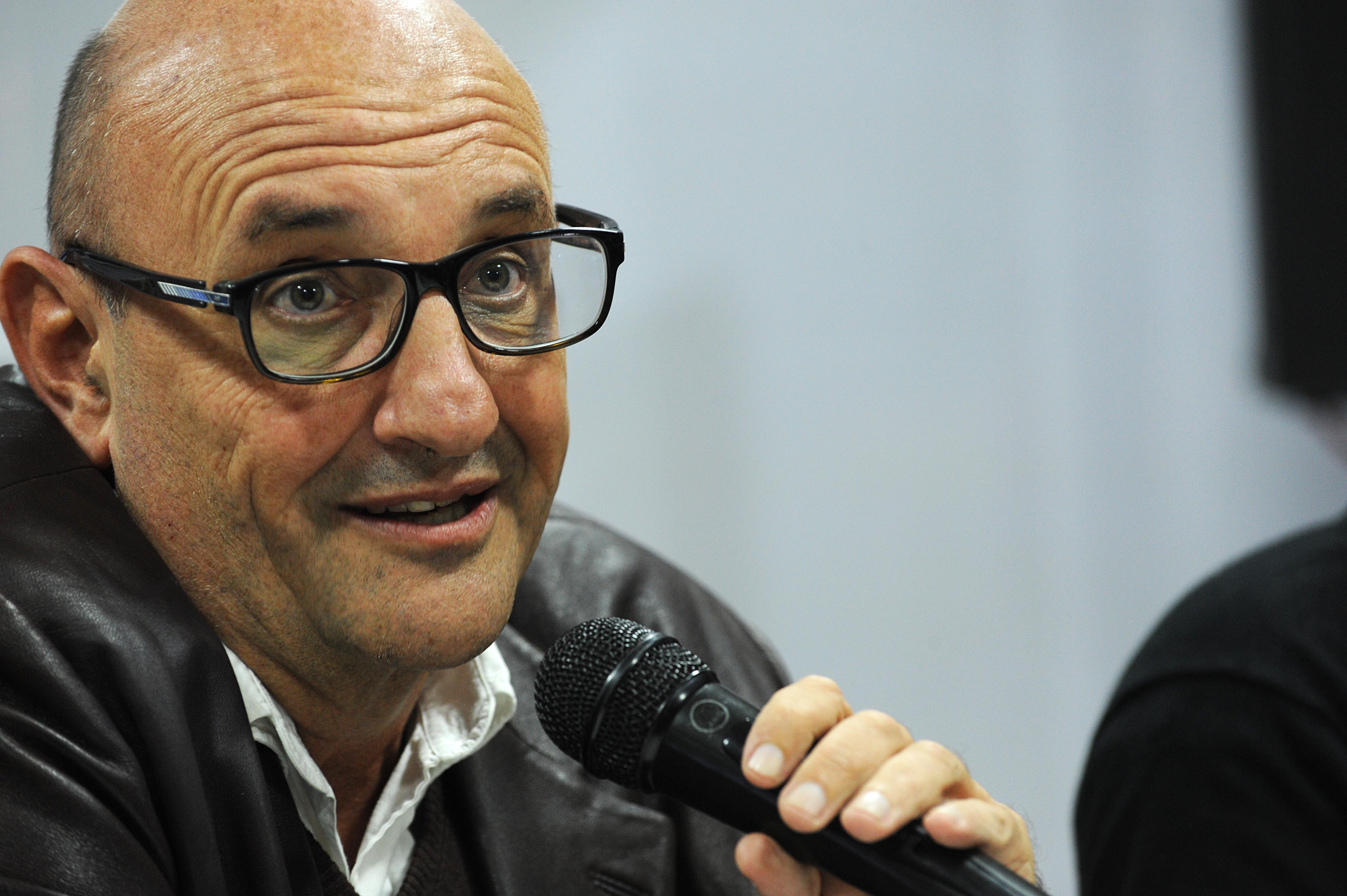
Gabriel Goity

Gabriel Goity (born c. 1960) is an Argentine theatrical, film and television actor. He was born in the small Argentine town of El Palomar.

== Biography ==
Goity left Palomar and moved to Buenos Aires with his family. His grandparents in particular instilled a love in him for drama. His grandfather was a film and theater lover and he would often take Goity to the movies and to watch plays.

He was undecided about what he wanted to become in life until 1981, when he went to see Cyrano de Bergerac in Buenos Aires. He became inspired by the work that actor Ernesto Blanco did on the play, and decided to take acting seriously, becoming a student at the prestigious Conservatorio de Arte Dramático, where some of Argentina's most famous actors have also graduated from.

Goity began acting in film soon after graduating from the conservatory, and he made multiple films in Argentina, often in the role of the melancholic character. Most of his jobs during the earlier stages of his career, however, were on theater plays.

He admits that some of his plays have not been generally seen with good eyes by Argentine theater critics; such was the case of one play, where he starred alongside Cristina Banegas: the play was so criticized, that the producers and cast decided to make mock promotion of it, telling the public to "come see Argentina's worst criticized play" on their newspaper ads.

In the year 2000 Goity appeared in the romantic drama Acrobacias del corazón.

Despite the many movies and plays that Goity had done, it wasn't until 2004 that he became famous, when hired by Telefe to play "Uriarte" in the television Spanish soap opera, "Los Roldán". In "Los Roldán", Goity played a middle-aged man who is in love with a transvestite (but who ignores that his love interest is a man), faces a marriage crisis and opposes "Tito Roldán", head of the family that moves next to Uriarte’s mansion.

Goity shared credits in that soap opera with Florencia De La V, Claribel Medina, Lola Berthet and Miguel Ángel Rodríguez, among others.

Soon after the soap opera ended, Goity said of his newly found popularity that "(he) went from signing one autograph each week to signing fourteen autographs each day!"

Goity is currently starring in a play named "Adentro" ("Inside").
