= Lamb of God (film) =

2008 French-Argentine drama film

- Spanish: Cordero de Dios
- Directed by: Lucía Cedrón
- Written by: Lucía Cedrón; Santiago Giralt; Thomas Philippon; Pablo Ibañez
- Produced by: Lita Stantic
- Starring: Mercedes Morán; Jorge Marrale; Leonora Balcarce; Juan Minujín; María Izquierdo; Malena Solda; Ignacia Allamand
- Cinematography: Guillermo Nieto
- Edited by: Rosario Suárez
- Music by: Sebastián Escofet
- Release date: 25 January 2008 (IFFR)
- Running time: 90 minutes
- Countries: Argentina; France
- Language: Spanish

Lamb of God (Spanish: Cordero de Dios) is a 2008 Argentine historical drama film directed by Lucía Cedrón, in her debut work.

== Synopsis ==
Lamb of God takes place in two different periods of Argentine history, thirty years apart. The film begins in 2002, with the Buenos Aires kidnapping-for-extortion of Arturo, a rich 77-year-old veterinarian who had thirty years earlier sympathized with the dictatorship and maintained good relations with the military. The kidnappers contact his thirty-year-old granddaughter Guillermina to obtain ransom, and she in turn turns to her mother, Teresa, who has lived in France as an exile for many years.

In 1978, Teresa and her husband, Paco, were militants against the dictatorship. Teresa was kidnapped and held in a detention center, before being eventually released. She subsequently found out that Paco had died in an unexplained shooting.

During negotiations for Arturo's release, the characters remember via flashbacks the events that each of them lived through in 1978, revealing the true plot.

== Cast ==
- Mercedes Morán as Teresa, 2002
  - Malena Solda as Teresa, 1978
- Jorge Marrale as Arturo
- Leonora Balcarce as Guillermina
- Juan Minujín as Paco
- María Izquierdo as María Paz, 2002
  - Ignacia Allamand as María Paz, 1978
