= Romina Gaetani =

Argentine actress, TV host and singer (born 1977)

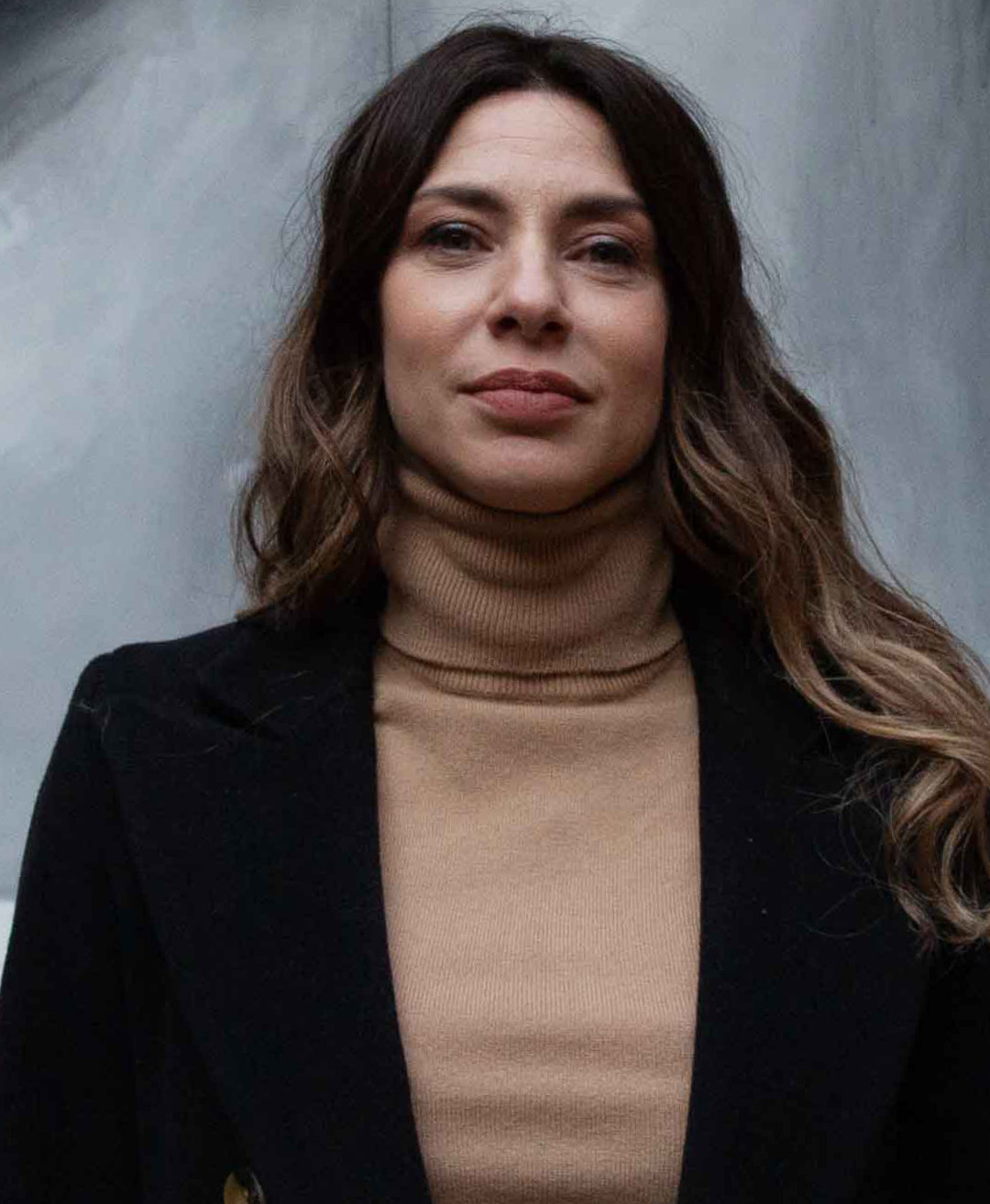
- Gaetani in 2021
- Born: April 15, 1977 (age 48); Buenos Aires, Argentina
- Occupations: actress, singer and tv host
- Years active: 1998–present
- Height: 1.68 m (5 ft 6 in)
- Website: www.rominagaetani.com

Romina Gaetani (born April 15, 1977) is an Argentine actress, TV host and singer.

== Biography ==
Romina Gaetani was born on April 15, 1977, in Buenos Aires, Argentina. Her mother is Maria Flamini and her father was the producer Carlos Hugo Gaetani, who died in 2014. She has also a brother named Leonardo who is an architect. From an early age Romina demonstrated her interest in acting, so she enrolled herself in the theater institute Andamio 90, in the acting career, during four years. She studied her secondary years in the institute of Santa Ana de Villa Ballester, in the north zone of the Gran Buenos Aires.

== Career ==
Her first role on television was in the unitary Verdad consecuencia in the year 1998. Her acting debut in the theater was in the musical comedy El rey David in the role of Betsabé and directed by the director Pepe Cibrián Campoy, in the year 1998. That same year she joined the cast of the telenovela Verano del '98, in the role of Carla. In the year 2000 her first leading role came in the sixth season of Chiquititas in the role of Luz Linares. She participated in the soundtrack and theatrical season of the cycle in Teatro Gran Rex. The following year she was counterfigure of Facundo Arana and Gianella Neyra in the Telefe telenovela, Yago, pasión morena. She continued acting in Mil millones and in the year 2003 she was the protagonist of the telenovela of Pol-Ka Soy gitano. Along with Dady Brieva starred Los secretos de papá since the second half of 2004. Then she acted in the Argentine version of Amas de casa desesperadas. In the time period of 2007–2008 she traveled to Mexico to record the television series Mientras haya vida where she played Romina Sáenz, the antagonist of the telenovela next to Saúl Lizazo and Andrés Palacios. In theater she acted in works as Seda, Revista nacional and Cinco mujeres con el mismo vestido. In the year 2008 she starred in the telenovela of Telefe Don Juan y su bella dama, along with Joaquín Furriel. In the years 2009 and 2010 she starred Botineras along with Nicolás Cabré and Isabel Macedo. In 2011 she returned to Pol-Ka to star in Herederos de una venganza, alongside Luciano Castro. The following year she participate in Lobo playing Miranda. Between the years 2012 and 2013 she acted in the works Recordando con ira and Triste golondrina macho, and on television she participated in the unitary Televisión por la justicia for which she was nominated for the Emmy Awards for Best Actress. Until March 9, 2015, she starred the telenovela Noche y día along with Facundo Arana, but she had to resign due to health problems. In 2018 she has a participation in novel Simona playing Siena Velasco the girlfriend of Dr. Guerrico.

== Television ==
| Year | Title | Character | Channel | Notes |
|---|---|---|---|---|
| 1998 | Verdad consecuencia | | Canal 13 | |
| 1998 | Verano del 98 | Carla | Telefe | |
| 1999 | Buenos vecinos | Lorena | Telefe | |
| 2000 | Chiquititas | Luz Linares | Telefe | |
| 2000 | Tiempo final | Luciana | Telefe | Episode: "Sr. Juez" |
| 2001 | Yago, pasión morena | Cassandra García/Melina | Telefe | |
| 2002 | 1000 millones | Pilar Arias | Canal 13 | |
| 2002 | Tiempo final | Mariana | Telefe | Episode: "La despedida" |
| 2002 | Poné a Francella | Client of the concesionaria | Telefe | Sketch: "Ojitos Azules" |
| 2003 | Soy gitano | Isabel Salvatori | Canal 13 | |
| 2004 | Los secretos de papá | Eugenia | Canal 13 | |
| 2005 | Mujeres asesinas | Norah | Canal 13 | Chap. 16: Norah, amiga |
| 2006 | Mujeres asesinas 2 | Laura | Canal 13 | Chap. 9: Laura, madre amante |
| 2006 | Amas de casa desesperadas | Carla Otegui | Canal 13 | Nominated – Martín Fierro |
| 2007 | Mujeres asesinas 3 | Nora | Canal 13 | Chap. 3: Nora, ultrajada |
| 2007 | Mientras haya vida | Romina Sáenz | TV Azteca | |
| 2008–2009 | Don Juan y su bella dama | Josefina Molina | Telefe | Nominated – Martín Fierro |
| 2009–2010 | Botineras | Laura Posse / Mia Alberdi | Telefe | Nominated – Martín Fierro |
| 2011–2012 | Herederos de una venganza | Mercedes Leiva | Canal 13 | Nominated – Martín Fierro |
| 2012 | El hombre de tu vida | Maggie | Telefe | Temp. 2 Chap. 10 and 11 |
| 2012 | Lobo | Miranda Solari | Canal 13 | |
| 2012 | Se trata de nosotros | Laura Marín | | Chap. 2 |
| 2013 | Santos y pecadores | Jorgelina | Canal 9 | Chap. 3: Entre muros |
| 2014 | La celebración | Mimí | Telefe | Chap. 10: Día del niño |
| 2014–2015 | Noche & Día | Paula Pico | Canal 13 | Until chap. 65: #Paula |
| 2015 | La Casa | Agustina | TV Pública | Chap. 10: Ficción |
| 2018 | Simona | Siena Velasco | Canal 13 | |

== Theater ==
| Year | Work | Director | Theater |
|---|---|---|---|
| 1998 | David, el rey | Pepe Cibrián Campoy | Teatro Liceo |
| 2000 | Chiquititas | Cris Morena | Teatro Gran Rex |
| 2004 | Seda | Francisco Javier | Teatro La Comedia |
| 2006 | Cinco mujeres con el mismo vestido | Norma Aleandro | Teatro Maipo |
| 2012 | Recordando con ira | Mónica Viñao | Teatro Municipal General San Martín |
| 2013 | Triste golondrina macho | Guillermo Arengo and Blas Arrese Igor | Teatro Regio (Buenos Aires) |
| 2017 | La momia | Alejandro Lavallen | Teatro Metropolitan (Buenos Aires) |

== Movies ==
| Year | Movie | Character | Director |
|---|---|---|---|
| 2010 | El derrotado | Celina | Javier Torre |
| 2013 | Bomba | | Sergio Bizzio |
| 2018 | Todavía | Emi | Tomás Sánchez |

== Discography ==
| Year | Solo | Album |
|---|---|---|
| 2000 | "Chiquititas 2000» | Chiquititas vol 6 |
| 2000 | "Te miro y tiemblo» | Chiquititas vol 6 |
| 2000 | "Luz de estrella» | Chiquititas vol 6 |
| 2000 | "Abre, entra» | Chiquititas vol 6 |
2016
| 2016 | Prólogo | La Rayada |
| 2016 | Hay un Tiempo | La Rayada |
| 2016 | Mala | La Rayada |
| 2016 | Extrañarte | La Rayada |
| 2016 | Fosforito | La Rayada |
| 2016 | Boqueteros | La Rayada |
| 2016 | Y Navegar | La Rayada |
| 2016 | Será Hoy | La Rayada |
| 2016 | Perdido | La Rayada |
| 2016 | De una Pasión | La Rayada |

== TV programs ==
| Year | Program | Channel | Notes |
|---|---|---|---|
| 2015 | Huella andina | Canal 9 | Debut as a TV Host |

== Awards ==
| Year | Award | Category | Program | Result |
|---|---|---|---|---|
| 2001 | Premios Clarín | Revelación femenina | Yago, pasión morena | Winner |
| 2003 | Premios Martín Fierro | Actress Protagonist of the novel | Soy gitano | Nominated |
| 2004 | Premios Martín Fierro | Actress Protagonist of comedy | Los secretos de papá | Nominated |
| 2007 | Premios Martín Fierro | Lead role Actress in drama | Amas de casa desesperadas (Argentina) | Nominated |
| 2008 | Premios Martín Fierro | Actress Protagonist of the novel | Don Juan y su bella dama | Nominated |
| 2009 | Premios Martín Fierro | Actress Protagonist of the novel | Don Juan y su bella dama Botineras | Nominated |
| 2011 | Premios Martín Fierro | Actress Daily fiction Protagonist | Herederos de una venganza | Nominated |
| 2014 | Internacional Emmy Awards | Best Actress | Televisión por la justicia | Nominated |
