= Juan y Eva =

- Promoional art of the movie
- Directed by: Paula de Luque
- Written by: Paula de Luque
- Starring: Osmar Núñez; Julieta Díaz
- Production company: Primer Plano
- Release date: September 15, 2011 (Buenos Aires)
- Running time: 110 minutes
- Country: Argentina
- Language: Spanish

Juan y Eva (Spanish: Juan and Eva) is a 2011 Argentine movie based on the relationship between Argentine president Juan Perón and his wife Eva Perón, founders of the Justicialist movement. It features Osmar Nuñez as Juan Perón and Julieta Díaz as Eva Perón. The film was directed by Paula de Luque and produced by Barakacine, Dida Films, and Fundación Octubre, among other companies and NGOs during the peronist government of Cristina Fernández de Kirchner.

== Plot ==
The story is based on the first meeting of Juan Perón and Eva Perón, during a fundraising for the recent 1944 San Juan earthquake, and their growing relation. The plot avoids the controversial political topics related to peronism, and focused instead in a romantic plot.

== Cast ==
- Osmar Núñez as Juan Perón
- Julieta Díaz as Eva Perón
- Alberto Ajaka as Juan Duarte
- Pompeyo Audivert as Edelmiro Farrell
- Sergio Boris as Domingo Mercante
- María Laura Cali as María Aurelia Tizón
- Alfredo Casero as Spruille Braden

== Reception ==
The Argentine president Cristina Fernández de Kirchner promoted the movie during a speech in Merlo.

== See also ==
- Cultural depictions of Eva Perón
