= El amor y la ciudad =

2006 film by María Teresa Costantini

- Directed by: María Teresa Costantini
- Written by: María Teresa Costantini
- Release date: March 2006 (Mar del Plata International Film Festival)
- Country: Argentina
- Language: Spanish

El amor y la ciudad (lit. 'The Love and the city') is a 2006 Argentine romantic drama film written and directed by María Teresa Costantini. It premiered at the Mar del Plata International Film Festival in Argentina on 10 March 2006.

The film was also shown at the 2006 Shanghai Film Festival, and the Rio de Janeiro International Film Festival.

== Cast ==
- Adrián Navarro
- Patrick Bauchau
- Vera Carnevale
- María Teresa Costantini
- Jean Pierre Noher
- José Palomino Cortez
- Jean Pierre Reguerraz
