= Willi Behnisch =

Argentine cinematographer

Willi Behnisch (born 1956 in Buenos Aires) is an Argentine cinematographer, film director, and screenplay writer. Most of his work is as a cinematographer. He is sometimes credited as Jorge Guillermo Behnisch.

Three of his most recent films he shot have been critically well received: Un Oso Rojo (2002), 18-j (2004), and Ay Juancito (2004).

== Filmography (partial) ==
Cinematography

- El Astillero (2000)
- La Fé del volcán (2001)
- Entre los dioses del desprecio (2001)
- Un Oso Rojo (2002) a.k.a. A Red Bear
- Cantata de las cosas solas (2003)
- Extraño (2003) a.k.a. Strange
- 18-j (2004)
- Ay Juancito (2004)
- Cuatro mujeres descalzas (2005)
- Las Manos (2006)
- Hamaca paraguaya (2006) a.k.a. Paraguayan Hammock
- Si fuera yo un helecho (2006)
