= Pablo Vázquez =

Pablo Vázquez or Vásquez may refer to:

- Pablo Vázquez (footballer, born 1984), Argentine footballer
- Pablo Vázquez Pérez (born 1994), Spanish footballer
- Pablo Vázquez Vega (1965–2026), Spanish politician
- Pablo Lucio Vasquez (1977–2016), American murderer
