= Antonio Grimau =

Argentine film and television actor (1944–2026)

- Grimau in 2012
- Born: Antonio Rebolini; 10 March 1944; Buenos Aires, Argentina
- Died: 19 October 2026 (aged 82); Buenos Aires, Argentina
- Occupation: Actor
- Years active: 1970–2020

Antonio Rebolini (10 March 1944 – 19 October 2026), known professionally as Antonio Grimau, was an Argentine actor. He appeared in over 80 films and television programs between 1970 and 2020, and was best known for playing Jano F. Amaya in the Argentine telenovela Soy gitano.

Grimau died in Buenos Aires on 19 October 2026, at the age of 82.

== Filmography ==
- 1964: Buenas noches, Buenos Aires
- 1974: Rolando Rivas, taxista
- 1974: La Mary
- 1974: El amor infiel
- 1975: Los orilleros
- 1977: La obertura
- 1978: Proceso a la infamia
- 1979: …Y mañana serán hombres
- 1979: De cara al cielo
- 1980: Ritmo a todo color
- 1983: Un hombre de arena
- 1986: Los insomnes
- 1987: Los corruptores
- 1988: Tres alegres fugitivos
- 1989: Deliciosamente peligrosa
- 1995: Caballos salvajes
- 1996: La maestra normal
- 1998: Secretos compartidos
- 2000: Acrobacias del corazón
- 2001: Nada por perder
- 2020: Angélica
