= Cristina Banegas =

Argentine actress

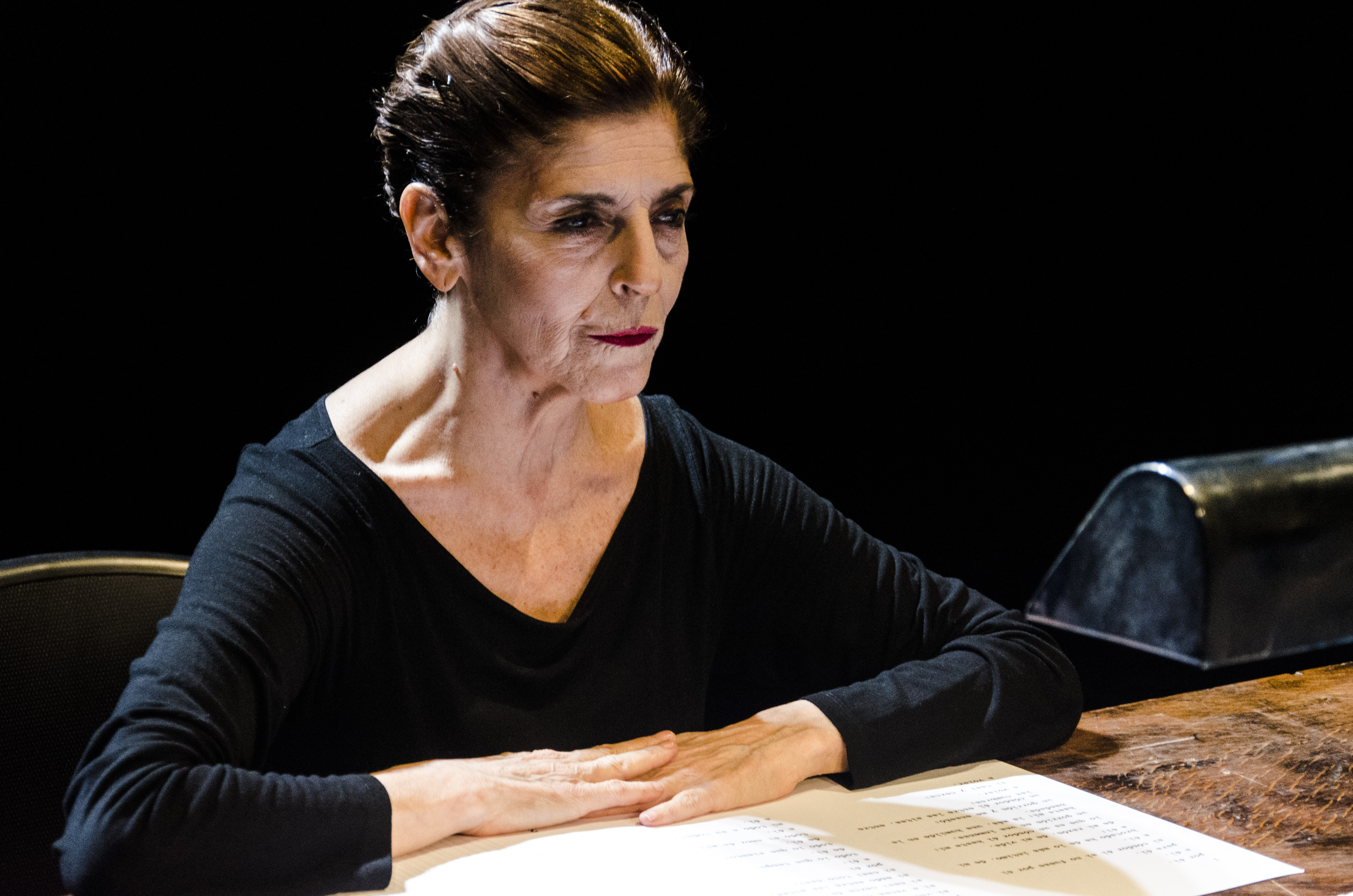
- Born: 26 February 1948 (age 77); Buenos Aires, Argentina
- Occupation(s): Actress, Theater Director, Tango Singer and Teacher
- Years active: 1965-present
- Spouse: Alberto Fernández de Rosa
- Children: Valentina Fernández de Rosa; Francisco Fernández de Rosa
- Parent(s): Oscar Banegas and Nelly Prince

Cristina Banegas (born 26 February 1948) is an Argentine film, TV and stage actress. She has appeared in more than fifty films since 1965.

== Selected filmography ==
Film
Year	Title	Role	Notes
2021	Fever Dream		
2011	Clandestine Childhood		
2005	La vida por Perón		
2001	Animal		
1998	The Cloud		
1996	Eva Perón: The True Story		
1969	Brief Heaven		

TV
Year	Title	Role	Notes
2009	Tratame bien	Clara Lombardo	
2005-2007	Mujeres Asesinas		
2004	Locas de amor		

== Awards ==
- International Emmy Award (2012)
