= Adrián Navarro =

Argentine actor

Adrián Navarro (born 24 October 1969 in Laferrere, Buenos Aires province) is an Argentine film and television actor.

== Filmography ==
- Ay Juancito (2004)
- Hermanas (2005)
- Ciudad en celo (2006) a.k.a. City in Heat
- El Amor y la ciudad (2006)
- Que parezca un accidente (2007)
- Las Viudas de los Jueves (2009) a.k.a. The Widows of Thursdays
- Medianeras (2011)
- Resurrection (2016 Argentine film)

== Television ==
- "Alta comedia" (1991)
- "Mi cuñado" (1993)
- "Buenos vecinos" (1999) a.k.a. "Neighbours"
- "Luna salvaje" (2000) a.k.a. "Wild Moon"
- "Por ese palpitar" (2000)
- "Yago, pasión morena" (2001) a.k.a. "Yago, Pure Passion"
- "22, el loco" (2001) a.k.a. "Love Triangle"
- "Máximo corazón" (2002) a.k.a. "Máximo in My Heart"
- "Franco Buenaventura, el profe" (2002) a.k.a. "Tango Lover"
- "Son amores" (2002) a.k.a. "Sweethearts"
- "Malandras" (2003) a.k.a. "Malandras"
- "Culpable de este amor" (2004) a.k.a. "Laura's Secret"
- "Ringtone" (2005)
- "Doble vida" (2005)
- "Montecristo" (2007)
- "Vidas Robadas" (2008)
- "Lobo, una leyenda de pasion" (2012) a.k.a. "Wolf, a legend of passion"
- "La defensora" (2012)
- "Historia clinica" (2012)
