= María Teresa Costantini =

Argentine actress, director, screenwriter (born 1949)

María Teresa Correa
- Born: María Teresa Correa Ávila; 9 October 1949 (age 76); Buenos Aires, Argentina
- Occupations: Actress; Film director; Screenwriter

María Teresa Correa Ávila (born 9 October 1949), professionally known as María Teresa Costantini, is an Argentine film actress, screenwriter and film director who has appeared in films since 1989.

== Life ==
She is the daughter of Lía Susana López Naguil and Carlos Correa Ávila, who served as ambassador and official in the first government of Juan Domingo Perón. Due to her father's work, Teresa lived most of her childhood and youth outside Argentina, in Italy, England and the United States. At the age of 17 she married businessman and art collector Eduardo Costantini, they divorced in 1994.

== Filmography ==
Costantini's films include:

- 1989, I Never Been in Vienna (actress)
- 1994, Of Love and Shadows (actress)
- 1997, Los dueños de los ratones (short film) (writer and director)
- 2000, Acrobacias del corazón (writer and director)
- 2002, Sin intervalo (English: "Without Break") ( (director)
- 2006, El amor y la ciudad (writer and director)
- 2009, Felicitas (writer and director)
