= Locas de amor =

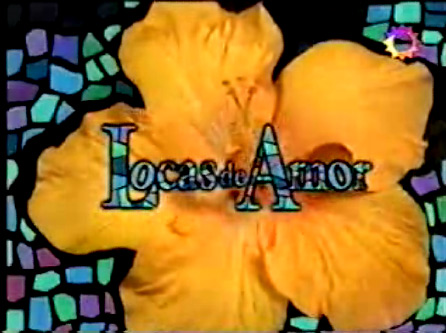
- Opening theme: Tu Locura; Gustavo Cerati
- Country of origin: Argentina
- No. of episodes: 35

Production
- Running time: 60 minutes

Original release
- Network: Canal 13
- Release: April 27 – December 15, 2004

Locas de amor is an Argentine series, produced by Pol-ka Producciones which was originally transmitted from April to December 2004. It was written and adapted for television by Suzana Cardozo. It was directed by Luis Barone and Daniel Barone. It starred Leticia Brédice, Julieta Díaz and Soledad Villamil. 52 episodes were made.

The show tells the story of three young mental hospital inmates: Juana, Simona and María, and their attempts to reinsert themselves into society after being released from the psychiatric institution.

== Cast ==
- Leticia Brédice... Simona Teglia
- Julieta Díaz... Juana Vazquez
- Soledad Villamil... Maria Eva Alchouron Doura
- Diego Peretti... Martin Uribelarrea
- Alfredo Casero... Roque Rizzutti
- Andrea Pietra... Frida Maurer
- Cristina Murta... Dra. Liliana Paredes
- Christina Banegas... Regina Terrile
- Leonor Manso... Olga Spinelli
- Paula Siero... Paula Goci
- Horacio Roca... Dr. Rafael Berthelot

== Trivia ==
- The theme music for the show was "Tu locura," by Gustavo Cerati. Cerati had composed an original piece simply named "Locura." Nevertheless, the artist chose to change songs at last moment. "Locura" was reworked, culminating in "Uno entre 1000" included in Cerati's Ahí vamos (2006).
- For the video of "Crimen", the first single for Ahí vamos, Cerati invited Julieta Díaz to play a dual role as secretary and femme fatale.

== Remake ==
In 2009 the company Televisa began to transmit the broadcast of the series remake Locas de amor under the same title block within the Series originales: Hecho en casa broadcast by Channel 5 in the production of Carmen Armendariz (Hora Marcada, Tony Tijuana) and headed by Francisco Franco with performances by Cecilia Suárez (Cappadocia, Mujeres asesinas), Diana Bracho (Fuego en la sangre), Cynthia Klitbo (El privilegio de amar) and Daniel Giménez Cacho (La mala educación), among others actors.
