= Rodolfo Ranni =

Italian Argentine film actor (born 1937)

- Born: 31 October 1937; Trieste, Italy
- Occupation: Actor
- Years active: 1958-present

Rodolfo Ranni (born 31 October 1937 in Trieste) is an Italian-Argentine actor. He has made over 85 film and TV appearances since 1958, and is widely recognized in Argentina as one of the best actors of his generation. Since the 1990s Ranni has appeared steadily in theatre, television dramas and soap operas.
