= List of Argentine films of 2024 =

A list of Argentine-produced and co-produced feature films released in Argentina in 2024. When applicable, the domestic theatrical release date is favoured.

== Films ==
Title	Director	Cast	Notes	Release	Ref.
The Freshly Cut Grass (El aroma del pasto recién cortado)	Celina Murga	Joaquín Furriel, Marina de Tavira, Verónica Gerez, Emanuel Parga, Alfonso Tort, Romina Peluffo		19 September	
The Blue Star (La estrella azul)	Javier Macipe	Pepe Lorente, Marc Rodríguez, Bruna Cusí, Pablo Álvarez, Cuti Carabajal, Mariela Carabajal		12 September	
Checkmate (Jaque mate)	Jorge Nisco	Adrián Suar, Maggie Civantos, José Eduardo Derbez, Tzachi Halevy, Benjamín Amadeo, Charo López, Diego Cremonesi, Mike Amigorena		25 January	
No Guilt (Culpa cero)	Valeria Bertuccelli, Mora Elizalde	Cecilia Roth, Valeria Bertuccelli, Justina Bustos		8 August	
Family Album (Álbum de familia)	Laura Casabé	Claudia Pía Baudracco			
Una jirafa en el balcón	Diego Yaker	Andrea Frigerio, Diana Gómez, Mimí Ardú, Claudio Gallardou, Artur Busquets, Mirta Busnelli, Juan Leyrado		5 September 2024	
Just One Spring (Una sola primavera)	Joaquín Pedretti	Majo Cabrera, Salma Vera, Ever Enciso, Miguel Romero, Mauricio Paniagua, Sonia Tiranti			
Kill the Jockey (El jockey)	Luis Ortega	Nahuel Pérez Biscayart, Úrsula Corberó, Daniel Giménez Cacho		26 September	
Kissing Bug (Vinchuca)	Luis Zorraquín	Fernando Vergara, Ana Sedoff, Marcelo Savignone, Rafael Sieg, Sabina Buss		26 November	
Linda	Mariana Wainstein	China Suárez, Julieta Cardinali, Rafael Spregelburd, Minerva Casero, Felipe Otaño, Agustín Della Corte		19 September	
The Man Who Loved UFOs (El hombre que amaba a los platos voladores)	Diego Lerman	Leonardo Sbaraglia, Sergio Prina, Osmar Núñez, Renata Lerman, María Merlino, Agustín Rittano, Norman Briski, Daniel Aráoz, Mónica Ayos		26 September	
Most People Die on Sundays (Los domingos mueren más personas)	Iair Said	Iair Said, Rita Cortese, Antonia Zegers, Juliana Gattas		7 November	
Rest in Peace (Descansar en paz)	Sebastián Borensztein	Joaquín Furriel, Griselda Siciliani, Gabriel Goity		21 March	
Something Old, Something New, Something Borrowed (Algo viejo, algo nuevo, algo prestado)	Hernán Rosselli	Maribel Felpeto, Alejandra Canepa, Hugo Felpeto, Leandro Menendez, Juliana Inae Risso		5 December	
Transmitzvah	Daniel Burman	Penélope Guerrero, Gustavo Bassani, Juan Minujin, Alejandro Awada, Alejandra Flechner		10 October	
Underground Orange (Bajo Naranja)	Michael Taylor Jackson	Michael Taylor Jackson, Sofía Gala, Vera Spinetta		10 October	
The Wailing (El llanto)	Pedro Martín-Calero	Ester Expósito, Mathilde Ollivier, Malena Villa		28 November	

== Box office ==
The ten most watched Argentine films in 2024, by in-year admissions, were as follows:

Most watched films of 2024
Rank	Title	Admissions	Gross ($)
1	Muchachos, la película de la gente ‡	162,399	1,107,773
2	Kill the Jockey (El jockey)	119,516	468,089
3	Nine Queens (Nueve reinas) †	83,023	194,090
4	No Guilt (Culpa cero)	72,008	320,379
5	Checkmate (Jaque mate)	60,182	183,805
6	When Evil Lurks (Cuando acecha la maldad) ‡	37,263	183,679
7	La Renga: Totalmente poseídos	35,593	125,512
8	Gigantes: Una aventura extraordinaria	32,921	138,964
9	Linda	29,072	103,930
10	El apocalipsis de San Juan	22,698	113,698
‡: 2023 theatrical opening; †: 2000 theatrical opening
