= Nahuel Pérez Biscayart =

Argentine actor

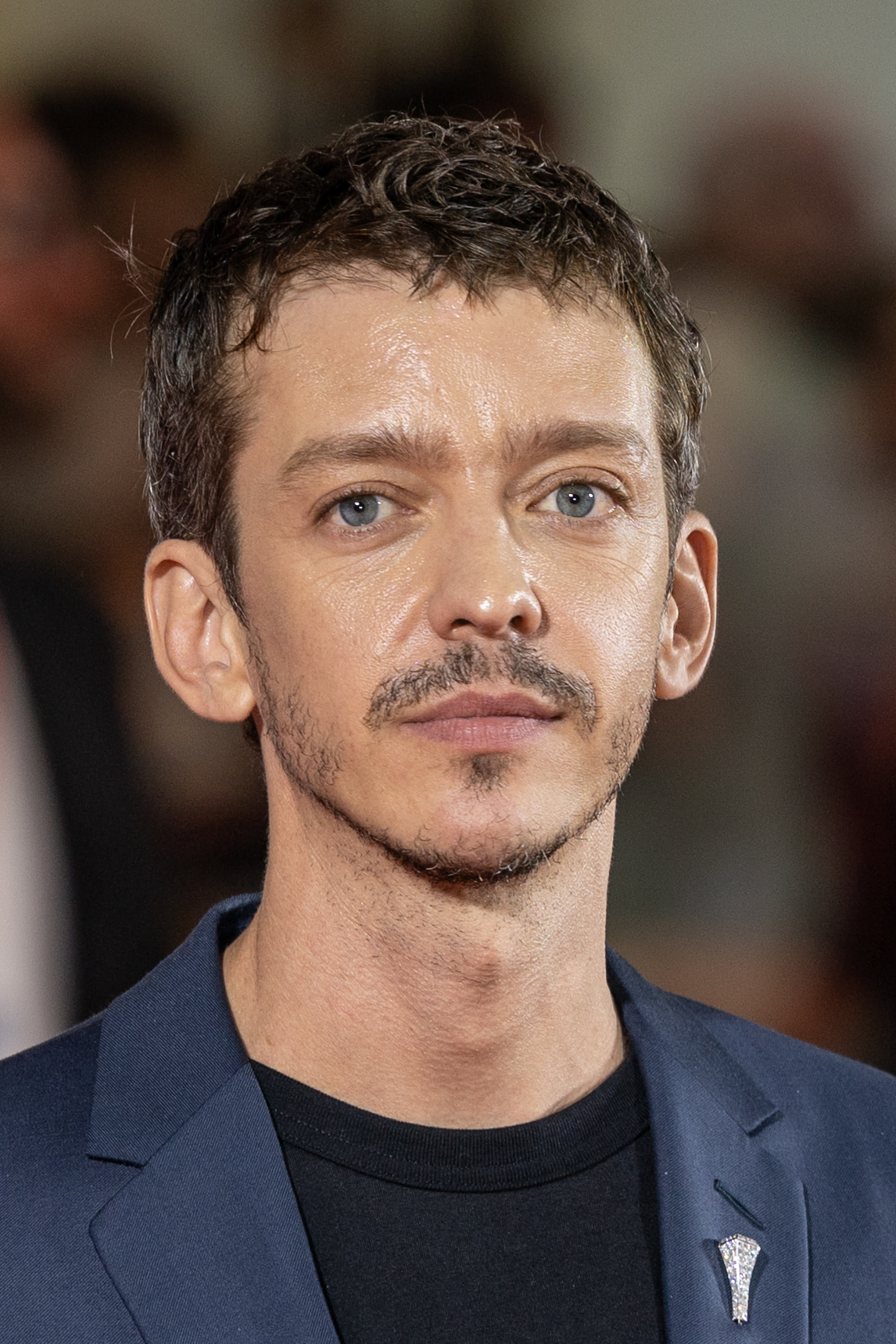
- Pérez Biscayart in 2024
- Born: 6 March 1986 (age 40); Buenos Aires, Argentina
- Education: Colegio Nacional de Buenos Aires
- Occupation: Actor
- Years active: 2003–present

Nahuel Pérez Biscayart (Spanish: [naˈwel ˈpeɾes βiskaˈʝaɾ], French: [nawɛl peʁɛz biskajaʁ]; born 6 March 1986) is an Argentine actor. A polyglot, he is best known for his role in the French film BPM (Beats per Minute) (2017), which earned him a César and a Lumière Award.

== Early life ==
Pérez Biscayart was born in Buenos Aires to a mother of Spanish-Basque and Italian descent and a father of Spanish-Andalusian descent. He trained at the Buenos Aires School of Fine Arts.

== Political views ==
In June 2024, Bisacayart signed a petition addressed to French President Emmanuel Macron demanding France to officially recognize the State of Palestine.

== Filmography ==
=== Film ===
Key
†	Denotes films that have not yet been released

Year	Title	Role	Director	Notes
2004	Próxima Salida	Abel	Nicolás Tuozzo	
2005	El Aura	Julio	Fabián Bielinsky	
2005	Tatuado	Paco	Eduardo Raspo	Silver Condor Award for Best New Actor
2006	Glue	Lucas	Alexis Dos Santos	Three Continents Festival - Best Actor
2006	Cara de queso 'mi primer ghetto'	Felman	Ariel Winograd	
2006	Todas las veces	The man	Alejo Franzetti	Short
2007	Familia Lugones	Gaspar	Paula Hernández	Documentary
2008	La sangre brota	Leandro	Pablo Fendrik	
2008	La hermana menor	Yuyo	Dodi & Roberto Scheuer	
2009	Silencios	Juan	Mercedes García Guevara	
2009	Pre-paradise	Nahuel	Jorge Torres-Torres	
2010	Patagonia	Alejandro	Marc Evans	
2010	Au fond des bois	Timothée	Benoît Jacquot	
2010	Antes	Tomás	Daniel Gimelberg	
2010	Alas (pobre Jiménez)	Arlequín	Ariel Martínez Herrera	
2010	Cerro Bayo	Lucas	Victoria Galardi	
2011	Pude ver un puma		Eduardo Williams	Short
2013	Grand Central	Isaac	Rebecca Zlotowski	
2013	Left Foot Right Foot	Vincent	Germinal Roaux	
2013	Que je tombe tout le temps ?		Eduardo Williams (2)	Short
2014	Lulu	Lucas	Luis Ortega (2)	Nominated - Silver Condor Award for Best Actor
2014	All Yours (Je suis à toi)	Lucas	David Lambert	Karlovy Vary International Film Festival - Best Actor; Festival Internacional de Cinema Queer Lisboa - Best Actor
2014	They Are All Dead	Diego	Beatriz Sanchís	
2014	Leveza	Alex	Pix Talarico	Short
2015	Beck's Last Summer	Rauli Kantas	Frieder Wittich	
2016	Stefan Zweig: Farewell to Europe	Vitor D'Almeida	Maria Schrader	
2016	El futuro perfecto		Nele Wohlatz	
2017	BPM (Beats per Minute)	Sean Dalmazo	Robin Campillo	Lumière Award for Best Actor; César Award for Most Promising Actor; Silver Peacock for the Best Actor Award (Male); Globes de Cristal Award for Best Actor
2017	See You Up There	Edouard Péricourt	Albert Dupontel	
2017	Agadah	Alfonso van Worden	Alberto Rondalli	
2017	If You Saw His Heart	Costel	Joan Chemla	
2019	Sick, Sick, Sick	Matthieu	Alice Furtado	
2020	The Intruder	Alberto	Natalia Meta	
2020	Persian Lessons	Gilles	Vadim Perelman	
2020	The Employer and the Employee	Rodrigo	Manolo Mieto	
2022	One Year, One Night	Ramón	Isaki Lacuesta	
2023	No Love Lost	Etienne Gravier	Erwan le Duc	
2024	My New Friends	Yann	André Téchiné	
2024	Sleep With Your Eyes Open	Leo	Nele Wohlatz	
2024	Kill the Jockey	Remo Manfredini	Luis Ortega	
2024	Becoming Ana		Marta Nieto	
2026	Narciso	Mr. Wesson	Marcelo Martinessi	

=== Television ===
Year	Title	Role	Director	Notes
2003	Disputas	Marcos	Adrián Caetano	Miniseries
2003	Sol negro	Marito	Alejandro Maci	Miniseries
2004	Sangre fría	Iván	Nicolás Goldar Parodi & Eduardo Ripari	Miniseries
2005	Botines		Jorge Nisco	Miniseries
2005	Conflictos en red		Alfredo Stuart, Nicolás Goldar Parodi (2), ...	Miniseries
2005	Ambiciones		Miguel Colom	Series (12 Episodes)
2005-08	Mujeres Asesinas	Marcelo	Daniel Barone, Alberto Lecchi & Jorge Nisco (2)	Miniseries
2006	Amas de Casa Desesperadas	René Oviedo	Marcos Carnevale & Sebastián Pivotto	Miniseries
2006	Hermanos y detectives		Damián Szifron	Series (8 Episodes)
2007	La señal		Rodrigo Moreno & Vivi Tellas	TV movie
2007	9 mm, crímenes a la medida de la historia		Ulises Rosell & Nicolás Goldar Parodi (3)	Miniseries
2008	Aquí no hay quien viva	Lucas	Grendel Resquin & Omar Aiello	Series (39 Episodes)
2009	Epitafios	Pablo	Alberto Lecchi & Daniel Barone (2)	Series (8 Episodes)
2010	Lo que el tiempo nos dejó		Luis Ortega	Miniseries
2011	El puntero	Herminio	Daniel Barone (3)	Miniseries
2012	Lynch	Pedro José	Felipe Martínez Amador	Series (1 Episode)
2019	Calls			Episode: "Dan le Noir"

== Theatre ==
Year	Title	Author	Director	Notes
2007	Les Parents terribles	Jean Cocteau	Alejandra Ciurlanti	Théâtre El Cubo
