= Viva (Israeli TV channel) =

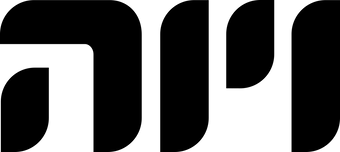
- Country: Israel
- Broadcast area: Nationwide
- Headquarters: Tel Aviv, Israel

Ownership
- Owner: Dori Media Group
- Sister channels: See the section below

History
- Launched: April 25, 1999; 27 years ago

Links
- Website: viva.mako.co.il

Viva (Hebrew: ויוה) is an Israeli television network owned by Dori Media Group. Launched in 1999 by producer Yair Dori, it brought Latin American telenovelas to the Israeli market, which are still the backbone of the channel's schedule, though more recently, similar productions from Korea, India and Turkey also made it to its offer. The network consists of a main channel (Viva Telenovelot), a channel specialized in Turkish productions (Viva Istanbul), a classics channel (Viva Vintage) and several SVOD offerings (Viva Binge, Viva Before All, Viva Premium).

== History ==
=== Background ===
The channel's founder, Yair Dori, is an Argentine-born Jew who moved to Israel in 1966, as a follower of a Zionist movement in Argentina, who had moved there for ideological reasons and took part in the Six-Day War the following year, where he was made hostage at an Egyptian camp.

In 1987, while working at Hagim (חגים), he and his brother Daniel started importing Argentine cultural content to Israel. Initially limited to cassette tapes of Latin American musicians, the introduction of cable television saw his business grow to the video market. The Doris started with sporting events, initially highlights, before branching out to live satellite broadcasts of the finals of Copa América and Copa Libertadores. At the same time, they brought the rights to the Argentine telenovela La extraña dama, which became the first Latin American telenovela to be broadcast in Israel, and sold the rights to cable company Matav. In 1992, Dori secured Israeli rights to Canal 13's Antonella, achieving huge success to such an extent that it led, in 1994, to the visit of its lead actress Andrea del Boca. This was followed by the visits of the Argentine and Brazilian national football teams as well as a string of Latin American celebrities.

=== Early years ===
In 1996, Yair Dori International (the current Dori Media) was founded and in 1998, Yair started working on the upcoming Viva channel, which started broadcasting on April 25, 1999. At launch, it was one of two private local content channels on Israeli cable television, alongside the Israeli version of the National Geographic Channel, which also launched at the same time. As of November 1999, the channel averaged a 27% share on cable during the period between 7pm and midnight, an impressive figure for a channel that started six months prior. Approximately 290,000 households had access to the channel. The most popular series at the time was La usurpadora. The network already had access to 6,000 hours of content and was already negotiating with the networks and distributors even for telenovelas that were still under production. The channel initially aired for fifteen hours a day.

The channel's success led to the announcement in July creation of the first telenovela awards held by the channel, Viva 2000, scheduled for September. From launch to year-end 2000, Viva invested US$1,6 million in the acquisition of Latin American series and announced the filming of the first such Israeli production, Touching Happiness, with filming scheduled for the period between September and November 2000 and at a total cost of US$3,6 million for 120 episodes (approximately US$29,000 per episode). One of the first successes of the channel was Muñeca Brava, which led to the success of lead actress Natalia Oreiro. Oreiro also attended the first Viva awards ceremony, which was presented by actor Gabriel Cordo. 2001 saw the broadcast of the successful Colombian telenovela Yo soy Betty, la fea.

In November 2005, Viva submitted a request to include commercial advertising, following 360 Channels Group. Viva claimed that the lack of advertising was "artificially limiting the channel's sources of income" with the aim of reducing its output to the viewing audience. Viva broadcast its first Korean drama series in 2007, My Lovely Sam Soon.

=== 2014 reformat ===
The success of Turkish and Korean productions thwarted the channel's initial purpose of airing Latin American productions. On September 23, 2014, Viva rebranded and moved all non-Latin content to a new channel, Viva+.

In July 2015, Viva and Viva+ was made available on Cellcom TV.

== Impact ==
In Israel, foreign programming is frequently transmitted in its original language with Hebrew subtitles. The success of Viva at the very beginning led to an increase in the number of attendees (from 140 in 1998 to 600 in 1999) at the Cervantes Institute in Tel Aviv, which led to an increase in its building space.

The rising interest in the Spanish language led to the creation of Viva el Español (ויוה אל אספניול) in 2004, produced for the channel with assistance from the Tel Aviv Cervantes Institute. A small telenovela (Cafe Viva) was made for that purpose and, after the episode, actor Gustavo Bermúdez (in Spanish) and Deborah Adamson (in Hebrew) delivered information about the topics of the episode and key words and phrases. The series also had an interactive television function, with the datacasting functions being used to deliver additional content, including practices and a dictionary.

== Network of channels ==
=== Viva Telenovelot ===
Viva Telenovelot (Hebrew: ויוה טלנובלות), formerly known as just Viva until 2024, is the brand's main channel.

=== Viva Platina ===
Viva Platina (Hebrew: ויוה פלטינה) was Viva's first sister channel and launched in 2001 on Yes. It later expanded its reach to Tevel's digital package on October 23, 2001. Unlike the main Viva channel, Viva Platina was a subscription service, priced at 5 shekels à la carte or 2,5 shekels as part of other packages. At launch time, the channel aired additional telenovelas that didn't fit on Viva's schedule as well as teledramas or movies on Thursdays, which were repeated on Fridays and Saturdays. In addition, the channel also provided reruns of telenovelas already broadcast by the main channel.

=== Viva Istanbul ===
Viva Istanbul (Hebrew: ויוה איסטנבול) started in 2014 as Viva+ and adopted its current name and format on April 1, 2024. Until then, as Viva+ it absorbed its non-Latin American catalog of content from the main channel. As Viva Istanbul, it specializes exclusively in Turkish drama series.

=== Viva Vintage ===
Viva Vintage started broadcasting on April 12, 2020 and airs reruns of telenovelas broadcast on Viva in the 2000s and 2010s.

=== Viva Lefani Kulam ===
Viva Lefani Kulam (ויוה לפני כולם, Viva Before All) provides episodes of Viva's output across all linear channels days before airing. Unlike the other channels, Viva Lefani Kulam is entirely OTT.

=== Viva Binge ===
Viva Binge is an SVOD service that contains entire Viva series.

=== Viva Premium ===
Viva Premium (ויוה פרימיום) airs a wide assortment of telenovelas and related drama series from around the world. On Partner TV in February 2023, the channel was given compensation for subscribers who lost access to the main channel.
