= No Guilt =

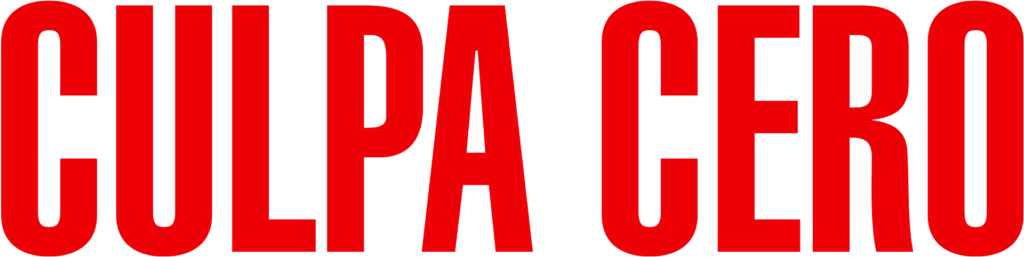
- Spanish: Culpa cero
- Directed by: Valeria Bertuccelli; Mora Elizalde
- Screenplay by: Valeria Bertuccelli; Mora Elizalde; Malena Pichot
- Story by: Malena Pichot; Valeria Bertuccelli; Julián Lucero
- Produced by: Pablo E. Bossi; Pol Bossi; Cabe Bossi
- Starring: Valeria Bertuccelli; Cecilia Roth; Justina Bustos; Gaia Garibaldi; Fabiana Cantilo
- Cinematography: Julián Apezteguía
- Edited by: Luz López Mañé
- Music by: Vicentico
- Production companies: Pampa Films; Gloriamundi Producciones
- Distributed by: Star Distribution
- Release date: 8 August 2024 (Argentina)
- Countries: Argentina; Spain
- Language: Spanish

No Guilt (Spanish: Culpa cero) is a 2024 comedy-drama film directed by Valeria Bertuccelli and Mora Elizalde from a screenplay they co-wrote with Malena Pichot. It stars Bertuccelli alongside Cecilia Roth and Justina Bustos.

The film was released in Argentine theatres on 8 August 2024 by Star Distribution.

== Plot ==
The career of unscrupulous self-help book writer Berta Muller is upended upon plagiarism accusations.

== Cast ==
- Valeria Bertuccelli as Berta Muller
- Cecilia Roth as Carola
- Justina Bustos as Marta
- Gaia Garibaldi as Olivia
- Fabiana Cantilo
- Martín Garabal as Ramiro
- Mara Bestelli as Sandra
- Mey Scápola
- Fabián Arenillas as Capalbo

== Production ==
No Guilt was produced by Pampa Films and Gloriamundi Producciones.

== Release ==
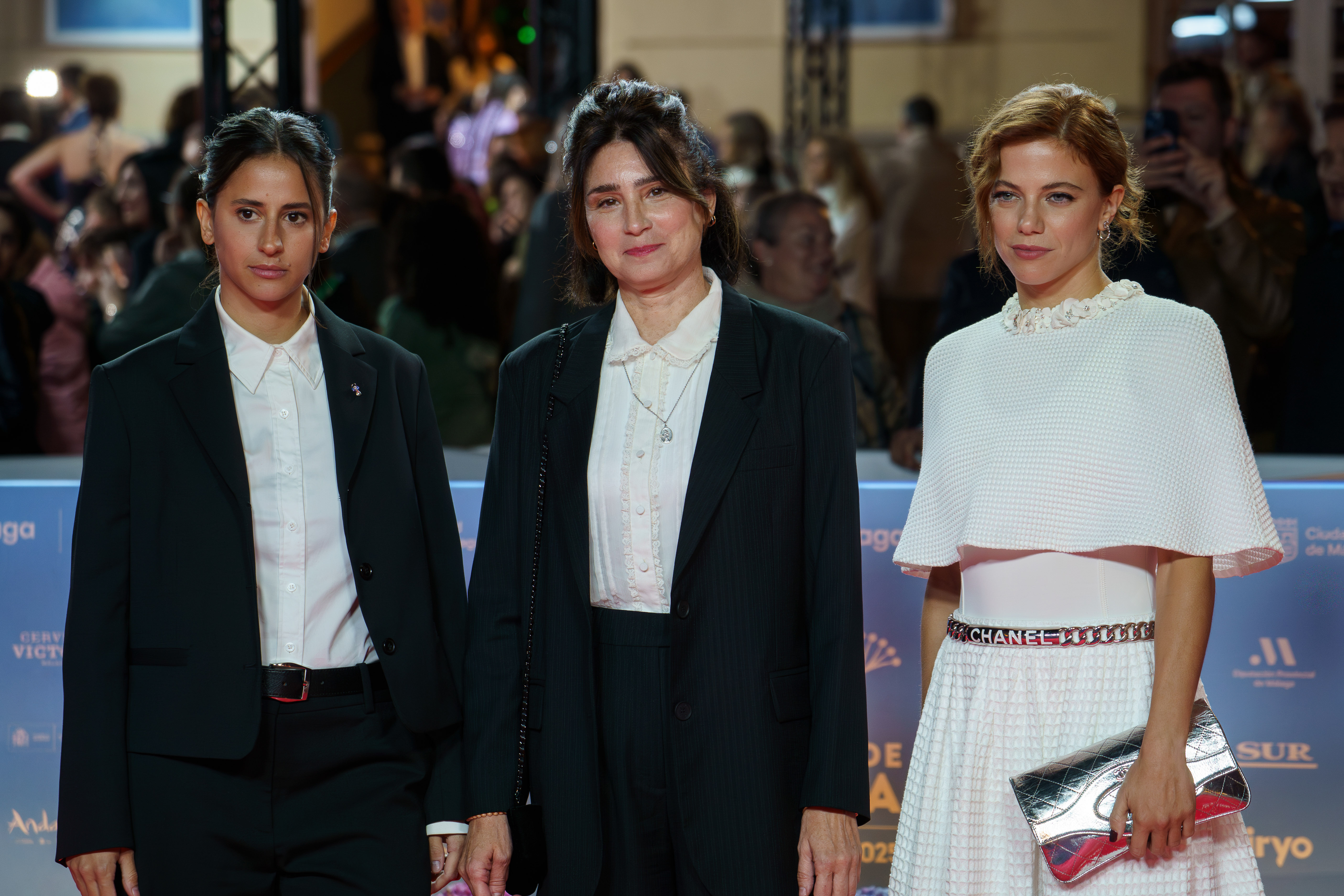
Elizalde, Bertuccelli, and Bustos attending the Málaga Film Festival in March 2025

The film was released theatrically in Argentina by Star Distribution on 8 August 2024. For its Spanish premiere, the film made it to the main competition slate of the 28th Málaga Film Festival. Its festival run also included a selection for the 29th Lima Film Festival.

== Reception ==
Guillermo Courau of La Nación rated the film 4 out of 5 stars ('very good') praising how it manages to tackle "sensitive, difficult, and highly topical issues with the mastery of someone who knows what they are talking about, what they want to say, and how to say it".

== Accolades ==
Year	Award	Category	Nominee(s)	Result	Ref.
2025	72nd Silver Condor Awards	Best Actress	Valeria Bertuccelli	Nominated	

== See also ==
- List of Argentine films of 2024
