= El Patrón de la Vereda =

- Genre: Romantic comedy
- Created by: Raúl Lecouna
- Written by: Enrique Torres; Miguel Vega
- Directed by: Jorge Oneglia; Carlos Dell Aguila
- Creative director: Celina Amadeo
- Starring: Gustavo Bermúdez; Camila Bordonaba
- Theme music composer: Camila Bordonaba
- Opening theme: Por Ti by Camila Bordonaba
- Country of origin: Argentina
- Original language: Spanish
- No. of seasons: 1
- No. of episodes: 92

Production
- Executive producer: Feliciano Torres
- Running time: 50 minutes

Original release
- Network: América TV
- Release: March 21 – November 4, 2005

El Patron de la Vereda is an Argentine telenovela, filmed in 2005 for América TV. Written by Enrique Torres and Miguel Vega, produced by Raúl Lecouna and directed by Jorge Oneglia and Carlos Dell Aguila. It was starred by Gustavo Bermúdez and Camila Bordonaba. The antagonists were Víctor Laplace, Martín Seefeld, Lucrecia Blanco and Emilia Mazer.

== Plot ==
Gastón Amilcar Alberti (Gustavo Bermúdez) one of the richest heirs in the country, son of a powerful businessman who owns a multimedia. Gastón will be in charge of the popular music division of his father's record company. Gastón Alberti is living his last single days. He will marry María Pía Bernasconi (Lucrecia Blanco). It is a suitable marriage for both families and that has the support of all. One night his friends organize a bachelor party. At the party there is a singer whom Gastón's friends ignore, but he does not. As soon as he hears the first chords, he recognizes the song, the song that he wrote to his high school girlfriend, his great love, he looks at the small stage and there he sees her, Graciela. Sisí Ponte (Camila Bordonaba) is a young woman with character, who knows very well what she wants, a fighter who wants to be a singer. She lives with Doña Aurora (Hilda Bernard) her grandmother, an administrator of a neighborhood pension. To support herself, Sisí works at a hamburger joint by day and singing at the pub by night. Sisí will perform a song that Gastón had composed 18 years ago for his girlfriend at the time. Gastón will discover that the young woman is nothing less than the daughter of the woman he had been in love with 18 years ago. Graciela baptizes her daughter with her nickname. The meeting at the Pub will make their lives change forever, despite the age difference between the two, Sisi falls in love and will achieve Gastón that a true love is born, the first love for both of them. Although they will not have it easy, since everyone will be against this relationship, except for Mercedes Alberti (Ximena Fassi), Gastón's sister, Catalina (Paola Sallustro), Sisí's best friend and Lalo (Marcelo Cosentino), Gastón's best friend will be the only allies to fight against everyone's maneuvers to separate them. But fate will put obstacles in the way that they must overcome to achieve complete happiness.

== Cast ==
=== Protagonists ===
- Gustavo Bermúdez as Gastón Amilcar Alberti
- Camila Bordonaba as Sisí Ponte

=== Main cast ===
- Víctor Laplace as Franco Alberti
- Martín Seefeld as Bernardo Bernasconi
- Hilda Bernard as Doña Aurora
- Ximena Fassi as Mercedes Alberti
- Lucrecia Blanco as María Pía Bernasconi
- Emilia Mazer as Isabel González de Alberti
- Paola Sallustro as Catalina
- Diana Lamas as Verónica
- Marcelo Cosentino as Lalo
- Segundo Cernadas as Javier
- Gino Renni as Carmelo
- María José Gabin as Arlinda
- Nicolás Scarpino as Mario
- Luis Mazzeo as Papin
- Anabel Cherubito as Chelita
- Marcelo Serre as Nabuco

=== Antagonists ===
- Víctor Laplace as Franco Alberti
- Martín Seefeld as Bernardo Bernasconi
- Lucrecia Blanco as María Pía Bernasconi
- Emilia Mazer as Isabel González de Alberti

=== Participations ===
- Silvina Luna as Lucy Ferita
- Jazmín Beccar Varela as Maggie
- Nicolás Riera as Student
- Celina Font as Silvana Rivas
- Pablo Heredia as Román
- María Roji as Alicia
- Diego Child as Ernesto
- Solange Verina as Aylén
- Maite Zumelzú as Candela
- Sebastián Mogordoy
- Germán Tripel
