= Funes, a Great Love =

1993 film by Raúl de la Torre

Funes, un gran amor
- Directed by: Raúl de la Torre
- Written by: Ugo Pirro; Raúl de la Torre
- Based on: Novel Háblenme de Funes by Humberto Costantini
- Produced by: Raúl de la Torre
- Starring: Graciela Borges; Gian Maria Volonté
- Cinematography: Juan Carlos Desanzo
- Edited by: Norberto Rapado; Marcela Sáenz
- Music by: Charly García; Raúl de la Torre
- Distributed by: Raúl de la Torre Producciones
- Release date: 1 April 1993
- Running time: 110 minutes
- Country: Argentina
- Language: Spanish

Funes, a Great Love (Spanish: Funes, un gran amor) is a 1993 Argentine musical drama film directed by Raúl de la Torre and starring Graciela Borges, Gian Maria Volonté, Pepe Soriano, Moria Casán and Andrea Del Boca. It is based on a novel by Humberto Costantini.

The film consists of a series of flashbacks told by one of the characters, which date back to the 1930s and take place in a brothel in a small town in Argentina.

== Cast ==
- Graciela Borges as Azucena Funes
- Gian Maria Volonté as Bergama
- Pepe Soriano as Herminio
- Moria Casán as Felisa
- Andrea del Boca as Beatriz Núñez
- Rodolfo Ranni as Tito Izquierdo
- Nacha Guevara as Amanda
- Jairo as Julito Diaz
- Dora Baret as Sofía
- Beba Bidart as Doña Pancha
- Alfredo Zemma as Master Paladino
- Juan Cruz Bordeu as Mario
- Matías Gandolfo as Miguel
- Antonio Tarragó Ros as Musiquero
- Susana Rinaldias Tana
- Aníbal Vinelli
- Virgilio Expósito
- Daniel Binelli
- Roberto Amerise
- Carlos Buono
- Juan Carlos Copes
- María Nieves
- Teresa Brandon
- Carol Ilujas
- María José Gabín
- Argentinita Vélez
- José Andrada
- Carlos Broggi
- Constantino Cosma
- Raúl de la Torre
