= Osvaldo Guidi =

Argentine actor (1964–2011)

Osvaldo Oreste Guidi (10 March 1964 in Máximo Paz, Argentina – 17 October 2011 in Buenos Aires) was an Argentine cinema, theater and television actor, and a dramaturge and theater director. He committed suicide by hanging.

He studied acting and theater pedagogy and for twenty years engaged in teaching in his Buenos Aires theater studio. He appeared in many theater productions (as an actor, writer and director), films, and television series.

== Filmography ==
=== Film ===
- 1979: Contragolpe
- 1980: Canción de Buenos Aires
- 1982: Plata dulce
- 1998: Tango
- 2000: Apariencias
- 2000: Sin reserva
- 2004: Peligrosa obsesión

=== Television ===
- 1988: La bonita página
- 1988: De carne somos
- 1989: Rebelde
- 1991: Chiquilina mía
- 1991: Celeste
- 1992: Antonella
- 1993: Zona de riesgo
- 1993: Casi todo casi nada
- 1994: Milagros
- 1994: Con alma de tango
- 1994: Más allá del horizonte
- 1995: Poliladron
- 1998: Muñeca brava
- 2000: Primicias
- 2000: Amor latino
- 2002: Infieles
- 2003: Resistiré
- 2003: Costumbres argentinas
- 2004: La niñera
- 2005: Amor mío
- 2006: Se dice amor

=== Theater ===
as playwright and director

- Ibseniana
- Tango mortal
- Milonga de ángeles
- Sexo necesidad maldita
- Yepeto

as actor

- Feizbuk Stars
- Escoria
- Partes iguales
- Ibseniana
- Cyrano de Bergerac
- Volpone y el zorro
- Scapino
- Tango mortal
- Milonga de ángeles
- Sexo necesidad maldita
