= My New Friends (film) =

2024 French film

- Theatrical release poster
- French: Les gens d’à côté
- Directed by: André Téchiné
- Written by: André Téchiné; Régis de Martrin-Donos
- Produced by: Sylvie Pialat; Benoît Quainon
- Starring: Isabelle Huppert; Hafsia Herzi; Nahuel Pérez Biscayart
- Cinematography: Georges Lechaptois
- Edited by: Albertine Lastera
- Music by: Olivier Marguerite
- Production companies: Les Films Du Worso; France 2 Cinéma [fr]; Same Player [fr]; Cine Nomine [fr]; Srab Films [fr]; Les Films du Camélia [fr]
- Distributed by: Jour2Fête [fr]; Pyramide Films [fr]
- Release dates: 19 February 2024 (Berlinale); 10 July 2024 (France)
- Running time: 85 minutes
- Country: France
- Language: French

My New Friends (French: Les gens d’à côté) is a 2024 French psychological drama film directed by André Téchiné. The film starring Isabelle Huppert, revolves around Lucie a specialized agent in the scientific police. Her solitary daily life is disturbed by the arrival in her housing estate of a young couple and their little girl.

It was selected in the Panorama section at the 74th Berlin International Film Festival and was screened on 19 February 2024. It was theatrically released in France on 10 July 2024.

== Synopsis ==
Lucie is an officer in the scientific police. She lives alone and her routine is disrupted by a new family moving into her apartment complex. As she befriends them, she finds out that Yann, the dad, has a history of opposing and breaking the law. Lucie faces a dilemma between her duty as a police officer and her wish to assist this family, which challenges her beliefs.

== Cast ==
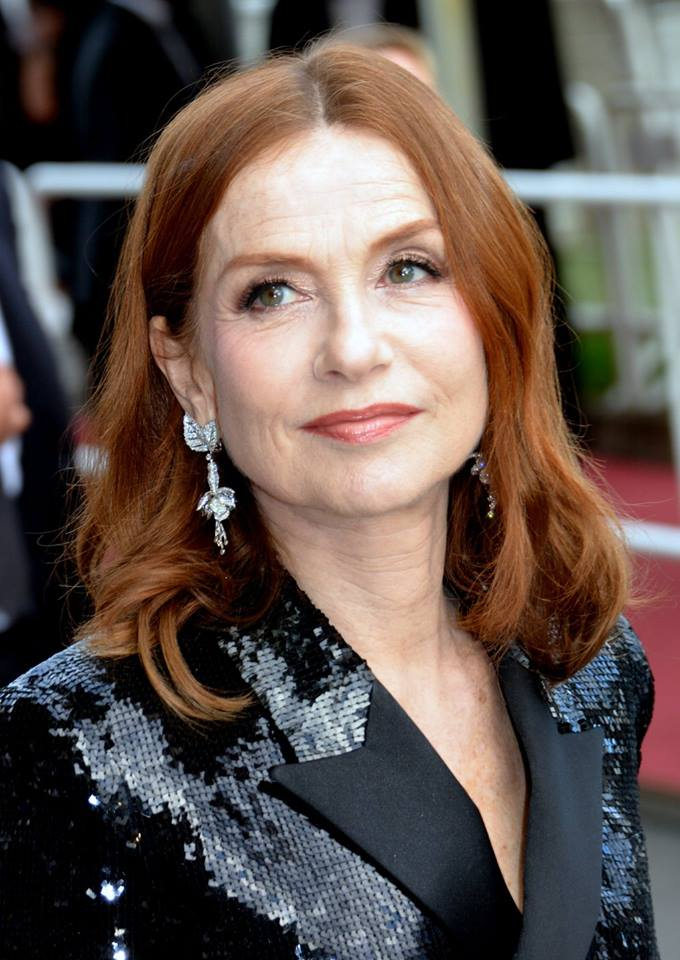
Isabelle Huppert (2018)

- Isabelle Huppert as Lucie
- Hafsia Herzi
- Nahuel Pérez Biscayart as Yann
- Stéphane Rideau
- Moustapha Mbengue
- Emmanuelle Hiron

== Production ==
The film is directed by André Téchiné for Les films du Worso. George Lechaptois and Albertine Lastera were respectively cinematographer and editor of the film.

Principal photography began on 9 January 2023 in Albères, Pyrénées-Orientales department, Occitania in France. Major part of the film was shot in the town of Saint-Génis-des-Fontaines, but some scenes were also filmed in Perpignan and Tresserre. In January 2023, it was reported that Isabelle Huppert was shooting for the film in the Occitanie region where the 30-day film shoot took place.

Filming ended on 24 February 2023.

== Release ==
My New Friends had its world premiere on 19 February 2024, as part of the 74th Berlin International Film Festival, in Panorama.

It was released in French theaters on 10 July 2024 by jour2fête.

== Reception ==
Fabien Lemercier reviewing the film at Berlinale for Cineuropa wrote, "Clearly, we still have Isabelle Huppert, who carries the entire film squarely on her shoulders, not to mention a highly effective editing approach, but, sadly, it isn’t enough to elevate My New Friends to the great heights of Téchiné’s sophisticated ambitions."

Jordan Mintzer reviewing the film for The Hollywood Reporter dubbed it as "A misfire from a gifted auteur," and opined, "My New Friends does tackle some interesting issues, whether its professional versus personal commitments, conflicting political beliefs, or dealing with trauma and loss, but it fails to treat any of them convincingly."

Allan Hunter wrote in ScreenDaily while reviewing the film at Berlinale, "This is a police story without a shot fired in anger, any whiff of impropriety or a great mystery to be solved. Instead, the focus is on ordinary people, painful choices and the price of principles.

== Accolades ==
Award	Date	Category	Recipient	Result	Ref.
Berlin International Film Festival	25 February 2024	Panorama Audience Award for Best Feature Film	André Téchiné	Nominated	
