= Sick, Sick, Sick (film) =

2019 film

- Film poster
- Directed by: Alice Furtado
- Written by: Alice Furtado; Leonardo Levis
- Cinematography: Felipe Quintelas
- Edited by: Alice Furtado; Luisa Marques
- Production company: Estudio Giz
- Release date: 20 May 2019 (Cannes)
- Running time: 100 minutes
- Country: Brazil
- Language: Portuguese

Sick, Sick, Sick (Portuguese: Sem seu sangue, lit. 'Without your blood') is a 2019 Brazilian drama film directed by Alice Furtado. It was screened in the Directors' Fortnight section at the 2019 Cannes Film Festival.

== Cast ==
- Digão Ribeiro
- Juan Paiva
- Lourenço Mutarelli
- Luiza Kosovski
- Nahuel Perez Biscayart
- Silvia Buarque
