= A World of Love =

- Un mundo de amor
- Directed by: Mario Sábato
- Written by: Diego Santillán and Luz Tambascio
- Produced by: Emilio Spitz
- Cinematography: Américo Hoss
- Edited by: Rosalino Caterbetti
- Music by: Víctor Proncet
- Production company: Sudamericana S.A.
- Distributed by: Producciones del Plata
- Release date: 17 July 1975
- Running time: 90 minutes
- Country: Argentina
- Language: Spanish

A World of Love (Spanish: Un mundo de amor) is a 1975 Argentine comedy film directed by Mario Sábato with a screenplay by Diego Santillán and Luz Tambascio. It stars Andrea Del Boca, Ubaldo Martínez, Miguel Ligero and Nelly Beltrán.

The film premiered on 17 July 1975. Newspaper La Nación described it as an "optimistic fable", but Osvaldo Iakkidis referred to it in El Cronista Comercial as "monotonous".

== Plot ==
An orphaned girl lives with her maternal grandfather. When he is hospitalized due to a heart attack, the girl is taken to her paternal grandparents who will try to take her away from him.

== Cast ==
- Andrea Del Boca as Marcela
- Ubaldo Martínez as Don Jacinto
- Miguel Ligero as Francisco
- Nelly Beltrán as Doña Gladys
- Betiana Blum as Estela
- Augusto Codecá
- Martín Fonseca
- Marta Ecco
- Carlos Gros
- Blanca Lagrotta
