= Antonella (TV series) =

- Genre: telenovela
- Written by: Enrique Torres
- Directed by: Nicolás del Boca
- Starring: Andrea del Boca; Gustavo Bermúdez; Luis Luque; Hilda Bernard; Virginia Innocenti
- Country of origin: Argentina
- Original language: Spanish
- No. of seasons: 1
- No. of episodes: 165

Production
- Executive producer: Celso Durán
- Producer: Raúl Lecouna
- Production company: Sonotex

Original release
- Network: Canal 13
- Release: 1992 – 1993

Antonella is an Argentine telenovela directed by Nicolás del Boca and starring his daughter Andrea del Boca and Gustavo Bermúdez.

It originally aired in 1992 on Canal 13 (now El Trece), and expanded internationally.

== Background ==
Antonella was written by Enrique Torres and based on an idea by Torres and F. L. Lucas. It combined melodrama typical of traditional telenovelas with elements of comedy. In this series, Andrea del Boca, who at that time was at the height of her career, portrayed a charismatic heroine, very different from the ones she had played in previous telenovelas. She also contributed the theme song "Para este amor".

The series was very successful and became one of the most watched programs of 1992 in Argentina, while however, the last episodes signed a drop in ratings, meaning that it was unsuccessful. It was nominated to the Martín Fierro Award for the Best Telenovela and won the Best Supporting Actor and the Best Supporting Actress for Osvaldo Guidi and Hilda Bernard, respectively. Antonella eventually won the Best Telenovela award at the 1993 Martín Fierro Awards. The series was also distributed abroad and found popularity in Italy and Eastern Europe in the mid-1990s, while it also in the United States of America in the original language.

In 1993, the series got cancelled after one season.

It is the only telenovela not to be owned by Sony, since the rights are currently held by Paramount Global (formerly ViacomCBS) as of October 10, 2021. It is currently not available to stream on Paramount+ as of yet.

== Plot ==
Antonella is a cheerful young woman working as a clown at children's parties. She lives with her friend Carlo whom she treats as father. During one of her outdoor performances for children she is approached by Nicolás and his son Federico. Nicolás is attracted to Antonella and invites her on a dinner date. It soon turns out that he is the boss of her sister Natalia who works as his secretary, and that they are having an affair. When Antonella walks in on them, in anger slaps the man in the face.

Nicolás is the head of a family company and entrusts Natalia some very confidential documents. His cousin Gastón is envious of his success and fiercely hates him. He orders two men to follow Natalia and seize the documents which he wants to use against Nicolás and to potentially take over his position. They do not realize that the woman, sensing danger, has just handed the documents to Antonella. Having entered her flat, but not able to get hold of the documents, they decide to kill Natalia by throwing her through the window, fabricating a suicide. Antonella does not believe that her sister killed herself and suspects that Nicolás was involved in this. Using blackmail, she ends up in his family residence working as a secretary, in the meantime conducting her own investigation and trying to unravel the mystery behind Natalia's death. There, she meets Gastón and other members of the Cornejo Mejía family: Lucrecia, their grandmother and the main owner of the company, Facundo, Nicolás' father, Raquel, Gastón's wife, and Paula, Lucrecia's illegitimate daughter. Antonella and Nicolás end up falling in love, which infuriates Miranda who also loves him and starts plotting intrigues against Antonella.

== Cast ==
- Andrea del Boca – Antonella
- Gustavo Bermúdez – Nicolás Cornejo Mejía
- Luis Luque – Gastón Cornejo Mejía
- Hilda Bernard – Lucrecia Cornejo Mejía
- Jorge D'Elía – Carlo Moricone
- Virginia Innocenti – Miranda
- Humberto Serrano – Facundo Cornejo Mejía
- Mimí Ardú – Raquel
- Osvaldo Tesser – Abelardo
- Mónica Galán – Paula
- Osvaldo Guidi – Arturo
- Gastón Martelli – Lorenzo
- Diego Bozzolo – Federico
- Vita Escardó – Natalia
