= Checkmate (2024 film) =

- Theatrical release poster
- Spanish: Jaque mate
- Directed by: Jorge Nisco
- Screenplay by: Leandro Calderone
- Produced by: Adrián Suar; Juan Pablo Galli; Juan Vera; Christian Faillace
- Starring: Adrián Suar; Maggie Civantos; José Eduardo Derbez; Tzachi Halevy; Benjamín Amadeo; Charo López; Diego Cremonesi; Mike Amigorena
- Cinematography: Guillermo Nieto
- Edited by: Francisco Freixa
- Music by: Alejandro Kauderer; Ignacio Tomás Gabriel
- Production companies: Patagonik Films; Amazon Studios
- Distributed by: Digicine
- Release date: 25 January 2024
- Country: Argentina
- Language: Spanish

Checkmate (Spanish: Jaque mate) is a 2024 Argentine action comedy film directed by Jorge Nisco from a screenplay by Leandro Calderone starring Adrián Suar. Maggie Civantos, José Eduardo Derbez, Tzachi Halevy, Benjamín Amadeo, and Charo López appear in supporting roles.

== Plot ==
Retired secret agent Duque is forced to return to action after his niece Juana is kidnapped by a terrorist group led by Rey, thereby coming to assemble his old team of international agents to carry out a heist for the ransom.

== Cast ==
- Adrián Suar as Duque
- Maggie Civantos as Sofía
- Mike Amigorena as Rey
- José Eduardo Derbez as Molo
- Tzachi Halevy as Iair
- Diego Cremonesi as Gaucho
- Benjamín Amadeo as Malcosido
- Charo López as Nancy
- Fiorella Indelicato as Juana

== Production ==
The film is a Patagonik and Amazon Studios production. Shooting locations included Buenos Aires as well as Potrerillos, Valle de Uco, and Tunuyán in the province of Mendoza.

== Release ==
Distributed by Digicine, Jaque mate was released theatrically in Argentina on 25 January 2024.

== Reception ==
Guillermo Courau of La Nación considered that despite being far from excellence, the film "is bearable and, prejudice aside, has little to envy to foreign titles".

Pablo O. Scholz of Clarín gave the film a 'good' rating, writing about a "solid proposal for entertainment".

== See also ==
- List of Argentine films of 2024
