= Operación Fangio =

- English: Operation Fangio
- Directed by: Alberto Lecchi
- Written by: Cláudia Furiati; Claudio Pustelnik; Manuel Pérez
- Produced by: Hernán Azcune; Adolfo Cora; Jorge Dyszel; Francisco Lázaro; Miguel Mendoza; Claudio Pustelnik; Félix Rodríguez; Pablo Rovito; Luis A. Sartor; Fernando Sokolowicz; Camilo Vives
- Cinematography: Hugo Colace
- Edited by: Miguel Ángel Santamaría
- Music by: Iván Wyszogrod
- Production companies: Aleph Producciones S.A. El Paso Producciones Cinematográficas S.L. El Puente Producciones S.A. Hasta la Victoria S.A. Instituto Cubano del Arte e Industrias Cinematográficos; Televisión Española (TVE); Tesela Producciones Cinematográficas
- Distributed by: Alfa Films; United International Pictures
- Release date: 1999
- Running time: 105 minutes
- Country: Argentina
- Language: Spanish

Operación Fangio is a 1999 Argentine-Cuban drama-suspense historical film directed by Alberto Lecchi and starring Darío Grandinetti. The film's subject is the 1958 kidnapping of champion Argentine racing car driver Juan Manuel Fangio in Havana, Cuba, ahead of the 1958 Cuban Grand Prix.

== Cast ==
- Darío Grandinetti
- Laura Ramos
- Ernesto Tapia
- Fernando Guillén
- Gustavo Salmerón
