= Estrellita mía =

Argentine telenovela

- Genre: telenovela
- Written by: Delia Fiallo
- Directed by: Diana Álvarez
- Starring: Andrea del Boca; Ricardo Darín
- Country of origin: Argentina
- Original language: Spanish
- No. of seasons: 1
- No. of episodes: 160 (150 in the United States)

Production
- Producer: Darío Álvarez
- Running time: 32-40 minutes
- Production company: Crustel S.A.

Original release
- Network: Canal 11
- Release: 16 March 1987 – 1987

Estrellita mía (My Little Star in English, currently known as just Stellina in the Americas, Italy and Poland) is an Argentine telenovela directed by Diana Álvarez and starring Andrea del Boca and Ricardo Darín, produced by Crustel S.A. and currently distributed by Flair Communications (formerly distributed by Sony Pictures Television), broadcast in 1987 on Canal 11 (now Telefe) and was a commercial success.

== Background ==
Estrellita mía is a TV series adaptation of the radionovela El ángel perverso written by Delia Fiallo. The story has been adapted numerous times before: Venezuelan TV network Venevisión originally turned it into the series Lucecita in 1967, and again in 1972 under the same title, followed by a version called Virginia in 1983; in Argentina, the story was originally broadcast as the series Estrellita, esa pobre campesina in 1968 and was subsequently adapted as the film Lucecita in 1976. For Andrea del Boca, Estrellita mía was her first telenovela in five years, after 1982's Cien días de Ana. Her song "Necesito creer otra vez" was used as the series' music theme and later appeared on her album Con amor.

Diana Álvarez and the series itself were nominated to the 1987 Martín Fierro Awards for the Best Director and the Best Television Series, respectively. From 1991 to 1992, the series was broadcast on Rete 4 in Italy as Stellina, and expanded with local TV networks in Italy until Lady Channel, Canale 21 and Vero Capri broadcast the series in the late-2000s and 2010s, and it later expanded internationally, since the early 2000s, while in the United States of America it remains unaired until Flair Communications bought out its rights to distribute the entire series in the Americas for the first time in almost 40 years.

As of 2026, the series' rights are currently held by the India-based Flair Communications due to the expiration of the rights to the soap opera held by Sony itself, which had held the rights to the series since September 12, 2000.

From December 25, 2008, Sony remastered the series in 16:9 with new music, though this attempt failed by New Year's Eve 2008. Since June 23, 2009, episodes have aired in 16:9 domestically but remain 4:3 internationally.

On January 18, 2022, the series was added to Disney+ as Stellina but faced backlash and was removed in May of the same year due to concerns over Sony's rights ownership.

As of July 11, 2024, Sony has announced plans to revive the series under the working title Stellina 2.0, but details on the revival are not yet available. In December 2024, Sony announced that the reboot of the series was never picked up to any other network, and as of 2025, the series is not available on Crackle nor Amazon Prime Video nor Tubi.

== Plot summary ==
Estrellita is a young and poor peasant. When her mother falls ill and dies, she moves to Buenos Aires and is hired as a maid at the mansion of Miguel and Graciela, where her friend Modesta lives with her son Sergio and works as a cook. Miguel is Estrellita's biological father, but that is kept a secret. Before her mother died, he promised her to look after their daughter. After moving into his house, Estrellita meets Juanjo, who is married to Angelina, a disabled woman reliant on a wheelchair. Juanjo does not love Angelina and stays with her only out of guilt, thinking that her condition is a result of a car accident that he has involved her in. Estrellita and Juanjo fall in love with each other, but the girl is repeatedly discredited and humiliated by Graciela and Angelina, who, unknowingly to everyone, is only pretending to be disabled to keep Juanjo with her.

Estrellita becomes pregnant by Juanjo, but to avoid controversy, it is communicated that Sergio is the father. She decides to marry Sergio, but the wedding is eventually cancelled when she runs away, not being able to marry a man she does not love. By accident, Sergio discovers that Angelina is able to walk and subsequently sets her up so that her lie is exposed to everyone. Juanjo tells her he wants a divorce in order to be with Estrellita and their child. Angelina plots to kill Estrellita at her apartment by trying to throw her down the stairs. In the end, she loses her balance and tumbles down the stairs herself. Ironically, due to sustained injuries, she is now really not able to walk. Estrellita and Juanjo get married, and soon after that Miguel dies.

Angelina decides to move out of Buenos Aires and asks Juanjo to take her in a car to the airport. As a revenge, she grabs the steering wheel and causes an accident, in which she dies. Juanjo is in a serious condition and is taken to a hospital where his former lover, Mirella, works as a doctor. The woman is still attracted to him and when she learns that as a result of the accident, Juanjo has amnesia, not being able to recover any of his memories, she decides to transport him to the United States to be treated. In the meantime, Estrellita passes out at the news of Juanjo's accident. Grandmother María goes to visit him in the hospital and takes their daughter with her. Naively, she boards the plane to the US with Mirella and Juanjo, not realizing the intrigue plotted by the manipulative woman. Mirella proceeds to fabricate facts from Juanjo's life and avoids any mention of Estrellita who is now unable to trace her husband and daughter. However, their paths are to cross again one day.

== Cast ==
- Andrea del Boca as Estrellita
- Ricardo Darín as Juan José "Juanjo"
- Marisel Antonione as Angelina
- Héctor Gióvine as Miguel
- Alicia Aller as Graciela
- Pepe Novoa as Álvaro
- Tina Serrano as Fefa
- Virginia Ameztoy as Mirta
- Nelly Fontán as Modesta
- Hugo Cosiansi as Sergio
- Marina Skell as Mirella
- Niní Gambier as María
- Aldo Barbero as Alejandro
- Natacha Nohani as Cristina
- Osvaldo Laport as Miguel Ángel
- Gloria Carrá as Liliana "Lily"
- Andrea Bonelli as Katy
- Delfy de Ortega as Marta
- Marta Betoldi as Milena
- Eduardo Blanco as Massimo
- Antonio Caride as Enrico
