= Gustavo Bermúdez =

Argentine actor

- Born: Gustavo Ariel Bermúdez Ricciardi; July 21, 1964 (age 61); Rosario, Santa Fe, Argentina
- Education: Colegio La Salle
- Occupation: Actor
- Years active: 1982–present
- Height: 1.85 m (6 ft 1 in)
- Spouse: Andrea González (m. 1989; div. 2011)
- Partner: Verónica Varano (2020–present)
- Children: Camila Bermúdez González (b. 1991); Manuela Bermúdez González (b. 2000)
- Parent(s): Manuel Bermúdez and Isabel Ricciardi
- Relatives: Gabriel Bermúdez Ricciardi (brother)

Gustavo Ariel Bermúdez Ricciardi (born July 21, 1964 in Rosario, Argentina) is an Argentine actor.

== Personal life ==
Gustavo Bermúdez is the son of Manuel Bermúdez and Isabel Ricciardi. He has a brother who is three years older than him, called Gabriel. Gustavo studied at the Colegio La Salle.

Gustavo Bermúdez and Andrea González met in 1983 when he was 19 years old and she 18 years old. In the year 1989, Gustavo Bermúdez married Andrea González, a teacher. The couple divorced in the year 2011. On September 25, 1991, the couple's first child, a girl, was born whom, they called Camila Bermúdez González. On October 21, 2000, the couple's second child, a girl, was born whom, they called Manuela Bermúdez González.

Since 2020, Bermúdez has been in a relationship with the actress and television presenter Verónica Varano.

== Career ==
Bermúdez began his career in television in 1982. In 1982, he was part of the play El país de mi infancia. Between 1982 and 1983, he made the theatrical seasons of Monserrat. From 1983 to 1986, he was part of the cast of the youth television series Pelito. In 1985, he was the protagonist of the television series Rossé. In 1986, he was the protagonist of the television series El hombre que amo. In 1987, he was the protagonist of the television series Grecia with Grecia Colmenares. In 1988, he was part of the cast of the television series No va más (la vida nos separa). In 1990, he was the protagonist of the television series Quiero gritar que te amo with Andrea del Boca. In 1990, he was part of the cast of the television series Amándote II. In 1991, he was part of the cast of the television series El árbol azul. In 1991, he was the protagonist of the television series Celeste with Andrea del Boca. In 1991, he was the protagonist of the television series Antonella with Andrea del Boca. In 1993, he was the protagonist of the television series Celeste siempre Celeste with Andrea del Boca. In 1994, he was the protagonist of the television series Nano with Araceli González. From 1994 to 1995, he was part of the cast of the mexican television series Volver a Empezar. In 1995, he was the protagonist of the television series Sheik with Araceli González. In 1995, he was part of the play Romeo y Julieta. In 1996, he was he was part of the cast of the television series Alén, luz de luna. In 1997, he was he was part of the cast of the television series Laberinto sin ley. In 1998, he was the protagonist of the television series Alas, poder y pasión with Paola Krum. In 2002, he was the protagonist of the television series 1000 millones with Araceli González. In 2004, he was part of the cast of the television series Viva el español. In 2005, he was the protagonist of the television series El Patrón de la Vereda with Camila Bordonaba. From 2006 to 2007, he was part of the cast of the television series Sos mi vida. In 2014, he was the protagonist of the television series Somos familia with Ana María Orozco. Between 2015 and 2016, he made the theatrical seasons of Extraña pareja. In 2018, he had a small part in the television series El host. In 2021, he returned to television starring in the series Los protectores with Adrián Suar, Andrés Parra and Laura Fernández.

== Filmography ==
=== Theater ===
Year	Title	Character
1982	El país de mi infancia	Luisito Corazón de Bombón
1982-1983	Monserrat	Ricardo
1995	Romeo y Julieta	Romeo Montesco
2015-2016	La extraña pareja	Félix Unger

=== Television ===
Year	Title	Character	Channel
1983-1986	Pelito	Federico Prieto	Canal 13
1985	Rossé	Fernando Morris	Canal 9
1987	Grecia	Gustavo Gutiérrez	Canal 13
1988	No va más (la vida nos separa)	Diego Dávila	Canal 9
1990	Quiero gritar que te amo	Mariano Guzmán	Gems Televisión
1990	Amándote II	Dr. Ignacio Arana	Telefe
1990	Atreverse	Germán Olivera	Telefe
1991	El árbol azul	Franco Ferrero Visconti	Canal 13
1991	Celeste	Franco Ferrero Visconti	Canal 13
1992	Antonella	Nicolás Cornejo Mejía	Canal 13
1993	Celeste siempre Celeste	Franco Ferrero Visconti	Telefe
1994	Nano	Manuel "Nano" Espada	Canal 13
1994-1995	Volver a Empezar	Diego Molina	Televisa
1995	Sheik	Gabriel Ismael Arias Maldonado/Gamal Arias	Canal 13
1996	Alén, luz de luna	Pablo Pineda	Canal 13
1997	Laberinto sin ley	Judge Román Aliaga	Canal 13
1998	Alas, poder y pasión	Germán Esquivel	Canal 13
2002	1000 millones	Julián Vargas	Canal 13
2004	Viva el Español	Matías	Viva
2005	El Patrón de la Vereda	Gastón Amilcar Alberti	América TV
2006-2007	Sos mi vida	Víctor Lobo	Canal 13
2014	Somos familia	Joaquín Navarro	Telefe
2018	El host	Gustavo	Fox
2021	Los protectores		Star+
