= Alberto Lecchi =

Argentine film director (born 1954)

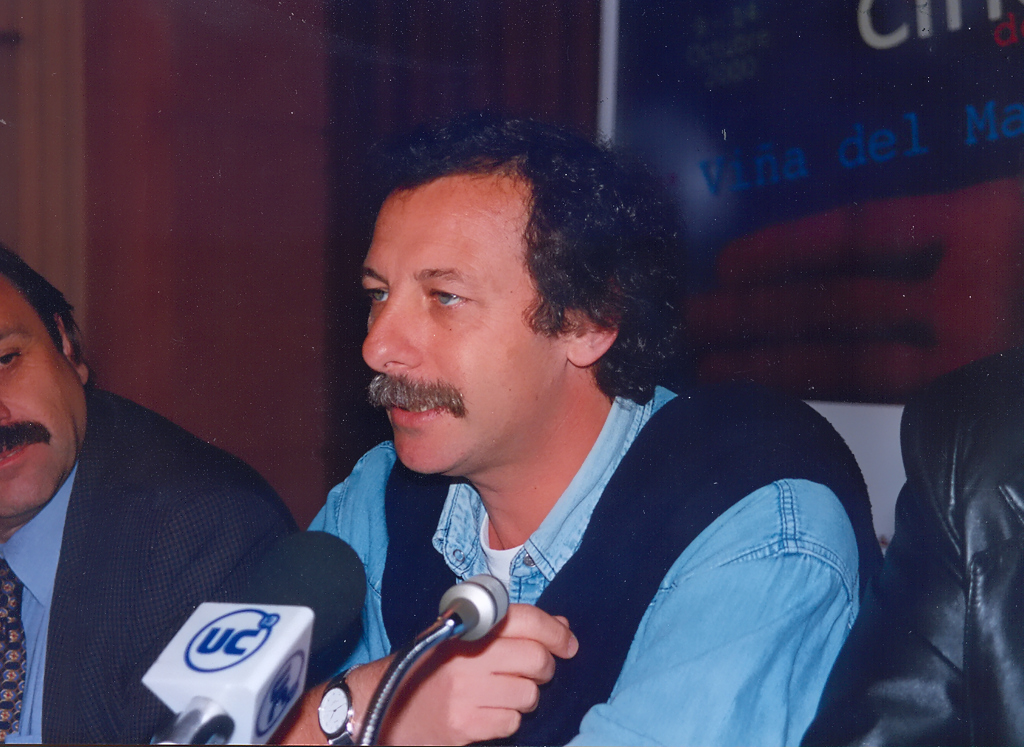
- Alberto Lecchi, Festival Internacional de Cine de Viña del Mar (2010)
- Born: 1954 (age 71–72); Buenos Aires, Argentina
- Occupations: Film director, screenwriter, Film producer

Alberto Lecchi (born 1954) is an Argentine film director, screenwriter and film producer.

Born in Buenos Aires, Lecchi started working in Argentine cinema in 1979, as a second assistant director to Hugo Sofovich in the three films he directed that year. Lecchi went on to work in the 80s and early 90s along acclaimed directors, working eight times with Fernando Ayala and four times with Adolfo Aristarain.

His directorial debut was in 1984 with El Sueño de Cecilia, a six-minute short, but came to prominence when he directed Ricardo Darín and Enrique Pinti in the thriller Perdido por perdido in 1993, his first feature-length movie, and his second turn as director, after which he gave up his career as assistant director. Lecchi established himself as a prolific film director in the 90s, directing The Salt in the Wound (El Dedo en la Llaga) (1996), the critically acclaimed Secretos compartidos (1998) and Operación Fangio (1998), and working with Argentine A-list actors Darío Grandinetti, Víctor Laplace, and Pinti.

In 2000, Lecchi directed the romantic comedy Apariencias, starring Adrián Suar and Andrea del Boca, as well as Nueces para el amor, which starred Gastón Pauls, Ariadna Gil and Rodrigo de la Serna. A year later he directed Déjala correr, starring Nicolás Cabré, Pablo Rago and Julieta Díaz. 2003 marked Lecchi's third collaboration with Grandinetti, in El Juego del Arcibel.

In 2004, Lecchi directed one of the shorts presented in the anthology 18-j, a collection of 10 shorts directed by 10 highly acclaimed Argentine directors homaging the tenth anniversary of the 1994 AMIA bombing. On the same year, he created the TV series Epitafios along fellow director Jorge Nisco, a 13-episode mini-series starring Julio Chávez, Paola Krum and Cecilia Roth. It was the first original series produced by HBO and HBO Latin America. He also directed an episode of the series Mujeres asesinas in 2006.

Lecchi has recently directed his ninth feature film, Una Estrella y dos cafés, which premiered 2006 and reunited the protagonists of Nueces para el amor, Pauls and Gil.
