= Apariencias =

2000 film by Alberto Lecchi

- DVD cover
- Directed by: Alberto Lecchi
- Written by: Gustavo Belatti; Mario Segade
- Produced by: Fernando Blanco; Adrián Suar; Juan Pablo Galli
- Starring: Andrea del Boca; Adrián Suar
- Cinematography: Marcelo Iaccarino
- Edited by: Alejandro Alem; Alejandro Parysow
- Music by: Iván Wyszogrod
- Production companies: Naya Films; Patagonik Film Group; Pol-Ka Producciones
- Distributed by: Distribution Company
- Release date: 22 June 2000
- Running time: 94 minutes
- Country: Argentina
- Language: Spanish

Apariencias (English: Appearances) is a 2000 Argentine romantic comedy film directed by Alberto Lecchi and starring Andrea del Boca and Adrián Suar. It was written by Gustavo Belatti and Mario Segade, based on an idea by Adrián Suar. The film was screened in the US in May 2001 and released on DVD in 2004.

== Plot ==
Carmelo is 30 years old and extremely shy. He is in love with his co-worker Verónica, but finds it difficult to reveal his feelings to her. She is sent to work abroad for three months, and when she announces her return, Carmelo decides to meet her at the airport, accompanied by his friend Beto, to confess his love for her. However, she returns with a handsome boyfriend, Federico, whom she is engaged to. Carmelo is heartbroken and upon leaving the airport, he is accidentally entangled with a gay rally. In an odd twist of fate, Verónica spots Carmelo and assumes that he himself is gay. He doesn't correct the wrong impression and takes advantage of this misunderstanding to get closer to her. They start working on a project together and Verónica starts falling for him.

== Cast ==
- Adrián Suar as Carmelo Posse
- Andrea del Boca as Verónica Ortiz
- Diego Pérez as Beto
- Fabián Mazzei as Federico
- Rita Cortese as Susana Posse
- Fernando Siro as Orlando Posse
- Jorge Rivera López as Esteban Ortiz
- Lucrecia Capello as Elsa Ortiz
- Favio Posca as Iñaqui
- Lidia Catalano as Delfina
- Natalia Lobo as Betty
- Rolo Puente as Nicosi
- Gabo Correa as Blanco
- Pablo Ini as Samilian
- Joselo Bella
- Eduardo Narvay
- Osvaldo Guidi
- Sebastián Pajoni
- Gabriel Kraisman
- Santiago del Moro as Party DJ
