= Viva el Español =

- Genre: Telenovela
- Starring: Gustavo Bermúdez; Deborah Adamson
- Country of origin: Israel
- Original languages: Spanish; Hebrew (subtitles, hosting segments)

Original release
- Network: Viva
- Release: May 30, 2004 – 2005

Viva el Español (ויוה אל אספניול) was an Israeli educational program broadcast by Viva, a channel specialized in telenovelas, mostly from Latin America. The series was produced with assistance from the Tel Aviv Cervantes Institute and had two presenters, Argentine actor Gustavo Bermúdez (in Spanish) and Deborah Adamson (in Hebrew), who introduced the contents of Café Viva, a show-within-a-show that, in each episode, emphasized the terminology used.

== Background ==
Most foreign programs seen on Israeli television are aired in their original language with Hebrew subtitles. Moreover, Israel had also received inbound immigration from Argentina and Uruguay, mostly from Jews. In the early 1990s, with the dawn of cable television, Argentine-born Yair Dori (who moved to Israel in 1966 as he was part of an Argentine Zionist movement) started bringing Argentine telenovelas to Channel 3, beginning with La extraña dama. The first telenovelas that came to Israel were Argentine, though titles from other countries came over time. With the establishment of Yair Dori Communications in 1996, he set up Viva, Israel's all-telenovelas channel, in 1998, starting its broadcasts the following year.

Viva's success had an impact on the Tel Aviv Cervantes Institute. In 1998, it had 140 attendees, but the launch of Viva caused the number of attendees to suffer a significant uptick, to 600. In 2000, the number doubled to 1,200. For this purpose, Yair Dori (through his channel Viva) contacted the institute to produce an educational program to increase interest in the language even further, as well as the culture of Spanish-speaking countries.

== Format ==
The series was divided in two segments. Each episode began with the hosts (Bermúdez and Adamson) introducing the viewers to the terminology used in the episode. This was followed by Café Viva (קפה ויוה). Bermúdez played a sexist, snobbish café owner, who is forced to work with a serious, conservative employee, played by Anderson. Also taking part was Israeli actor Jimmy Merillo, who played Claudio in the Israeli series Our Song, playing a policeman. The actor was a rising star and already spoke fluent Spanish.

== Production ==
Bermúdez arrived to Israel in mid-April 2004. He was a well-known face on local television because of the influence of Argentine telenovelas, but had limited participation in telenovelas since he opted to suspend his career in 1998, with an exception in 2002. The series lasted for around a year and had a length of 250 episodes.

== Interactive application ==
Viva el Español had an interactive application on Hot. The viewer had access to additional lessons as well as a dictionary.
