= Betina O'Connell =

Argentine actress

Betina O'Connell (Buenos Aires, April 5, 1972) is an Argentinian actress of theatre and television. She gained fame after her performance in the Young Adult show Montaña rusa. In 2014 she played Irene in Somos familia.

== Television ==
Television
Year	Title	Channel	Character
1994-1995	Montaña rusa	El Trece	Paula
1996	The angels do not cry	Canal 9 (Argentina)	Belén Linares
1997	Ricos y Famosos	Canal 9 (Argentina)	Trinidad 'Trini' Echeverri
1998-1998	As vos & I	El Trece	Mariana Of Alvear
2000	The doctors of today	El Trece	Martina
2001	PH	Blue TV	-
2001	Final time	Telefe	Ep:The Operating theatre
2002	Kachorra	Telefe	Mercedes "Fuse" Green
2002	Infidel	Telefe	-
2003	Sleeping with my boss	El Trece	Marina
2004	Culpable de este Amor	Telefe	Gimena Soldati
2005	Conflicts in network	Telefe	-
2006-2009	My Drinks	Utilísima	Conductive
2009	Inheritance of love	Telefe	Loredana Vitti
2011	3 Wishes	Utilísima	Conductive
2014	Somos familia	Telefe	Irene Lick
