= Andrea (film) =

- Directed by: Carlos Rinaldi
- Written by: Ulyses Petit de Murat
- Cinematography: Ignacio Souto
- Edited by: Gerardo Rinaldi
- Music by: Tito Ribero
- Release date: October 4, 1973
- Running time: 108 minutes
- Country: Argentina
- Language: Spanish

Andrea is a 1973 Argentine comedy film directed by Carlos Rinaldi, written by Ulises Petit de Murat and starring child actress Andrea Del Boca in the eponymous role. The film was scored by Tito Ribero.

== Cast ==
- Andrea Del Boca as Andrea
- Ángel Magaña
- Raúl Aubel
- Julieta Magaña
- Mario Passano
- Paquita Más
- Clever Dusseau
