= Somos familia =

- Title card
- Genre: Telenovela
- Created by: Enrique Estevanez
- Written by: Marcelo Nacci; Laura Barneix; Julián Rimondino; Bruno Luciani; Claudia Fagaburu; Pablo Finamore; Jessica Valls
- Starring: Gustavo Bermúdez; Ana María Orozco
- Opening theme: "Somos familia" by Álex Ubago
- Country of origin: Argentina
- Original language: Spanish
- No. of seasons: 1
- No. of episodes: 184

Production
- Executive producer: Pablo Ferreiro
- Producer: Quique Estevanez
- Production companies: LCA Producciones; Telefe

Original release
- Network: Telefe
- Release: January 6 – October 20, 2014

Related
- Los vecinos en guerra; Viudas e hijos del Rock & Roll

Somos familia (Spanish: We are family) is an Argentine telenovela produced and broadcast by Telefe in 2014. It stars Gustavo Bermúdez and Ana María Orozco.

== Plot ==
The main characters are Joaquín (Gustavo Bermúdez), a famous businessman, owner of a motorcycle manufacturing plant, and Manuela (Ana María Orozco), his maid. After the death of his friend Sergio Miranda and his wife in an airplane crash, Joaquín became the legal guardian of Miranda's four orphans. One of these orphans is Pilar Miranda, who is really the daughter of Manuela. Manuela had gotten pregnant at the age of 15 and had to give up her newborn daughter for adoption; years later, she became a journalist and began searching for her child. Upon discovering that Pilar had been adopted by the Mirandas, she took a job as a maid in their home. Upon the Mirandas' deaths, she came along with the children to work for Joaquín. To avoid revealing her true identity, she works under the assumed name of "Ramona".

== Premise ==
Somos familia is a traditional telenovela aimed at all age groups. The plot has similarities with Grande, pá!, one of Telefe's successful telenovelas of the 1990s. Bermúdez plays a traditional telenovela gentleman, seducing the female spectators with romance rather than physical appearance. Although the program is mainly a drama, it includes some comedy scenes, most of them played by actor Fabián Vena. Vena plays a Bon Vivant, similar to the Argentine comic book character Isidoro Cañones.

== Production ==
Somos familia is produced by Quique Estevanez, who previously produced the successful telenovela Dulce amor, also aired by Telefe. It is written by Marcelo Nacci and Laura Barneix. The closing credits of the first episodes did not mention Nacci and Barneix, which sparked criticism from author unions such as Argentores and the Asociación de Autores Audiovisuales. Argentores even sent a legal document requiring the correction of the closing credits. As the problem continued, Argentores sent two more legal documents on February 6.

The theme song, "Somos familia", was composed by Argentine artist Thian, who writes theme songs for TV programs, and performed by Spanish artist Álex Ubago. The song was produced in Spain in June 2013 by Rubén Caballero. The song also features Ricardo Urbina on drums, Joseba San Sebastián on bass, Rubén Caballero on guitar, Txus Aranburu on keyboard, and Laura Latienda in the chorus. The program was first aired during Ubago's 2014 tour in Argentina.

== Reception ==
The program, which had been awaited for months, was aired when the telenovela Solamente Vos at Channel 13 was nearing its end. Somos familia garnered a higher rating.

== Cast ==
- Gustavo Bermúdez as Joaquín Navarro
- Ana María Orozco as Manuela Paz/Ramona
- Betina O'Connell as Irene Lamas
- Tomás Fonzi as Pedro Mancini
- Pablo Alarcón as Gregorio Paz
- Mónica Cabrera as Ramona Isarrualde
- Martín Campilongo as Armando Flores
- Eva De Dominici as Pilar Miranda/Pilar González Ferri Paz
- Nicolás Furtado as Máximo Morales
- Augusto Schuster as Juan Inacio Miranda
- Silvina Bosco as Margarita Miranda
- Mimí Ardú as Elsa
- Luciana González Costa as Lola
- Ivo Cutzarida as Fabian Galván Ep:(55-97)
- Fabián Vena as Pablo Navarro
- Natalia Lobo as Flavia Carlucci
- Maxi Ghione as Francisco Morales
- Graciela Pal as Azucena Lobos
- Nora Cárpena as Beatriz Blasco
- Maite Lanata as Malena Miranda
- Fabián Mazzei as Andrés Saldivar
- Paula Morales as Julieta Paz
- Bárbara Vélez as Olivia Navarro
- Gabriela Sari as Agustina Graciani
- Micaela Wasserman as Delfina Miranda
- Olivia Viggiano as Camila Galván
- Gabo Correa as Sergio Miranda
- Jorge Noya as Marito
- Hernán Jimenez as Alexis
- Sabrina Rojas as Julia
- Franco Pucci as Junior Navarro
- Justina Bustos as Soledad Varela
- Stefano De Gregorio as Miguel
- Guido Pennelli as Gasparini Ep:(1-42)
- Adriana Salonia as Mabel Gonzáles Ep:(24-)
- Fabio Di Tomaso as Germán Colombo Ep:(37-74)
- Florencia Ortiz as Benigna Miranda Ep:(66-118)
- Valentín Villafañe as Tomás Ep:(75-)

Christian Sancho as Santiago Ferri
