= Mimí Ardú =

Argentine actress and vedette

- Born: 28 February 1956 (age 69); Río Cuarto, Cordoba, Argentina
- Occupation: Actress
- Years active: 1976–present

Mimí Ardú (born 28 February 1956, Río Cuarto, Cordoba) is an Argentinian actress and former vedette.

== Career ==
At age 15, Ardú began receiving piano lessons from a piano teacher. That same year, she obtained her first job in the Entry Institute of Philosophy and Language as an administrator and helping primary school students. She finished her secondary studies at the Liceo Nacional de Señoritas Nro. 12 de Caballito. She studied dancing with Noemí Coelho and acting with Carlos Gandolfo in Argentina and León Escobar in Mexico. She sang with Mabel Moreno in Argentina and with David Soule Zendejas in Mexico. During the summer of 1979, she performed in Mar del Plata, where she was very successful. This led to her Reina Reech in the comedy Enredos de alcoba at the Mar del Plata Provincial Theatre. Since then, she has been continuously performing in theatre and television, forming part of the cast of telenovelas and other popular programs.

She was initiated by her sculptural body as the second vedette of several theatrical magazines to later become an actress of dramatic character.

== Filmography ==
=== TV ===
- Scandal in the Family (1967)
- Ladies' Photographer (1978)
- Las Muñecas Que Hacen ¡PUM! (1979): Mimi Ardou
- Comandos azules en acción (1980)
- Sucedió en el internado (1985)
- Seguridad personal (1986)
- Antonella (1992): Raquel Cornejo Mejía
- El bonaerense (2002): Mabel
- Vereda tropical (2004): Kari Kerr
- A Year Without Love (2005): Auntie
- Lo bueno de los otros (2005): Doctora
- La demolición (2005)
- Paredón, paredón (2005)
- Mujeres asesinas (2006): Ana
- Patito Feo (2008): Susana
- The Man Who Came to a Village (2006): María
- Contra Las Cuerdas (2010): Beba
- Dulce amor (2013): Ofelia Molina
- Somos familia (2014): Elsa

=== TV-series ===
- La Chona superstar (1983, 3 episodes)
- Entre el amor y el poder (1984, 25 episodes): Pia Maru
- Buscavidas (1984, 19 episodes)
- Pelear por la vida (1984)
- Antonella (1991, 191 episodes): Raquel Cornejo Mejía
- Casi todo, casi nada (1993, 29 episodes)
- Pretty Face (1994, 130 episodes)
- Son de diez (1992-1995, 145 episodes)
- Señoras y señores (1997, 19 episodes)
- De corazón (1997-1998, 396 episodes)
- Endless Summer (1998)
- Hospital público (2003, 19 episodes): Marikena Volpe
- Los pensionados (2004, 115 episodes)
- Los machos de América (2004, 19 episodes)
- Cold Blood (2004, TV Mini Series, 6 episodes): Marga
- Se dice amor (2005, 254 episodes): Elena Suárez
- Conflictos en red (2005, (TV Mini Series, 1 episode): Mamá de Sebastián
- Killer Women (2006, 1 episode): Ana
- El pasado (2007)
- Two Friends and a Burglar (2008)
- ¡Me robaron el papel picado! (2009)
- Franzie (2010)
- Hermanitos del fin del mundo (2011): Profesora Perkins
- The Clairvoyant's Prayer (2012): Dra. Kessler
- Derecho de piso (2014): Madre de Daniela
- La Salada (2014): Woman of the bar
- Libre de sospecha (2015)
- Angelita la doctora (2016)
- Hojas verdes de Otoño (2018): Carmen
- Secretos de amor (2010, 68 episodes): Tere
- Contra las cuerdas (2010, 5 episodes): Beba
- Candy Love (2012, 19 episodes)
- La celebración (2014, TV Mini Series, 1 episode)

=== Cinema ===
- Las muñecas que hacen ¡pum! (1979)
- Comandos azules en acción (1980)
- El Bonaerense (2002): Mabel
- A Year Without Love (2004): Tía

=== Theatre ===
- Soñar en Boedo (2009; 2010)
- The House of Bernarda Alba (2013–2016)

=== More ===
- Un culebrón mejicano (2003, TV Movie)
- La profesora (2005, short film): The Professor
- Mujeres elefante (2007, TV Movie)

== Awards ==
Award	Category	Year
Silver Condor Awards	Revelation	2002
Clarín Awards	Female revelation in cinema	2002
Martín Fierro Awards	Supporting actress	2003
Starfish Awards	Nominated for best actress for her part in Soñar en Boedo	2010
