= Malena Pichot =

Argentine comedian, actress and screenwriter (born 1982)

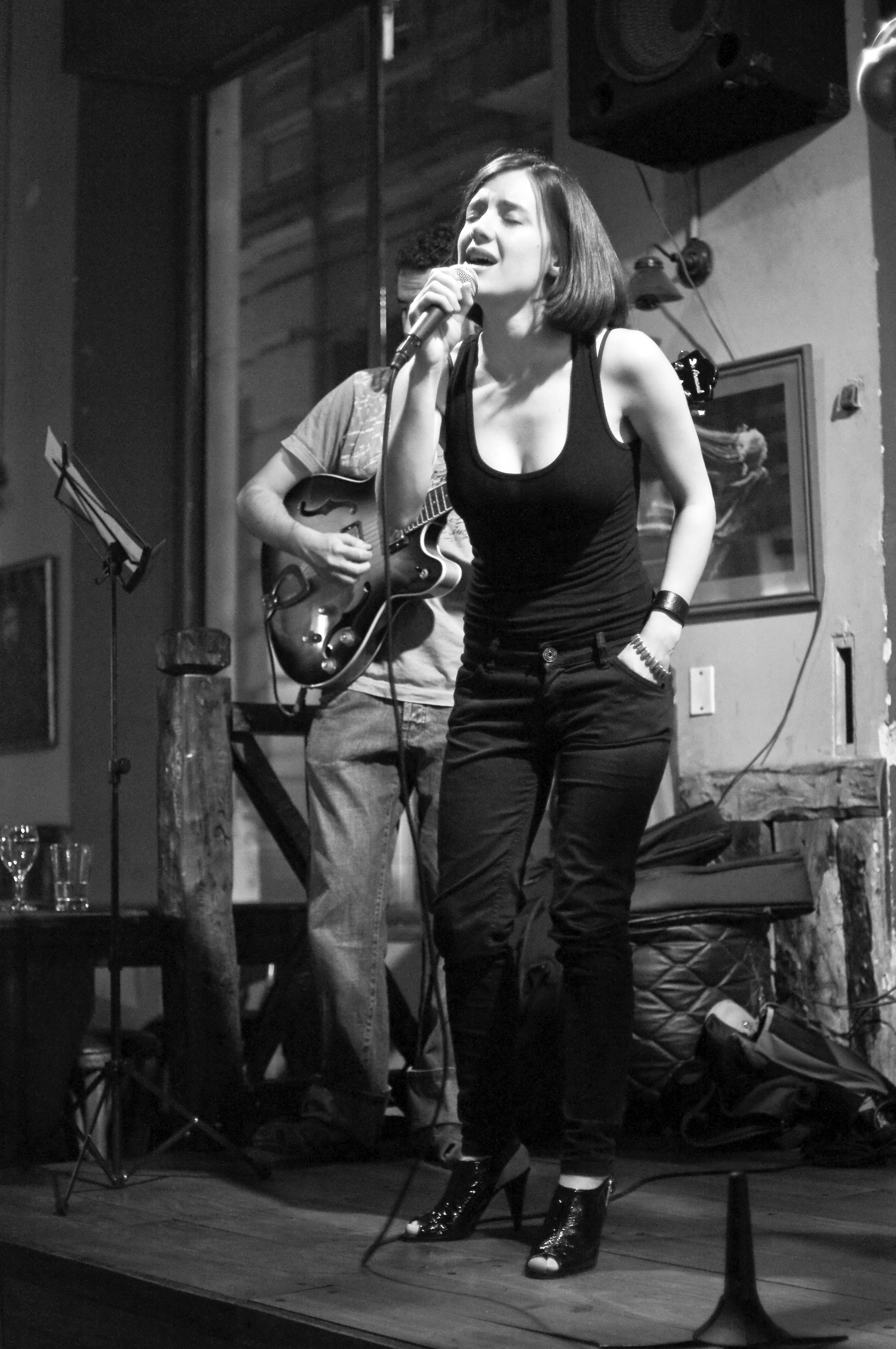
- Pichot in 2008
- Born: 6 July 1982 (age 44); Buenos Aires, Argentina
- Occupations: Comedian; actress; screenwriter
- Years active: 2008–present
- Partner: Leandro Lopatín (2012–present)
- Relatives: Agustín Pichot (cousin)

YouTube information
- Channel: Malena Pichot
- Genre: Comedy
- Subscribers: 392,000
- Views: 129 million
- Last updated: 4 August 2026

Malena Pichot (Spanish pronunciation: [piˈtʃot]; born 6 July 1982) is an Argentine feminist stand-up comedian, actress and screenwriter.

== Biography ==
Pichot rose to fame in 2008, when she uploaded a video to YouTube after breaking up with her boyfriend, titled "La loca de mierda" (roughly translated "The Fucking Crazy Woman"). After a series of humorous La Loca de Mierda YouTube videos were viewed by millions of people, MTV Latin America hired Pichot to broadcast her videos on its website.

After having become an Internet celebrity, Pichot presented her stand-up show Concheta pero con gracia (roughly translated "posh but funny",) and has been performing with Ezequiel Campa in the stand-up comedy show Campa-Pichot since 2010.

In 2011 Pichot joined the cast of El hombre de tu vida, an Argentine comedy series created by Juan José Campanella that aired in Telefe.

In 2012 Pichot had her own sketch comedy segment in Canal 9's show Duro de domar, called Cualca!, available in YouTube.

In 2013, she created and acted in two other series: Jorge, an 8-episode series on TV Publica, and Por ahora, a 13-episode series on Cosmopolitan TV.

In 2018, Pichot had a stand up special, Estupidez compleja (Complex Stupidity), air on Netflix. The show is about feminism and Argentine culture.

In 2019, she published Enojate, Hermana, a compilation of more than 30 of her own articles published in Página 12 between 2017 and 2019 referring to gender and feminism issues.

=== Family ===
She is the cousin of Argentine rugby player Agustín Pichot. In addition, Malena and Leandro Lopatín have a son together named Rafael Lopatín Pichot, who was born on June 12, 2023.
