= Epitafios =

Argentine television series (2004-2009)

Epitafios (English: Epitaphs) is an Argentine crime fiction television mini-series with the tagline: El Final Está Escrito ... The End Is Written. It aired on HBO from 2004 to 2009, spanning a total of two seasons. The series, which takes place in an unnamed South American city, was shot in Buenos Aires.

The series was produced by HBO Latin America and Argentine television and film company Pol-Ka Producciones. It was written by Marcelo Slavich and Walter Slavich and directed by Alberto Lecchi and Jorge Nisco. Although all of the actors were Argentine, a neutral Spanish was used instead of the local Rioplatense Spanish, avoiding colloquialisms such as the local vos in favor of the more common tú.

The series debuted in Australia on SBS in May 2007 under the title If The Dead Could Speak. It premiered in Poland on Cinemax on November 6, 2008. In Germany, it premiered on November 6, 2009 on pay TV channel Fox Channel under the title Epitafios - Tod ist die Antwort (Epitafios - Death Is The Answer).

== Plot ==
Bruno Costas (played by Antonio Birabent) seeks revenge on the people involved in the death of four high-school students during a hostage situation gone bad, five years before. The show's two protagonists are ex-detective Renzo Márquez (played by Julio Chávez) and psychiatrist Laura Santini (played by Paola Krum). To add a further twist to this whodunit (although it has many elements of a whydunit), Márquez and Santini are on-again, off-again lovers.

In the second half of the series, Renzo is aided by a homicide detective, Marina Segal (portrayed by Cecilia Roth), who herself is eventually held hostage by Costas. During her captivity, the psychopathic murderer forces her to kill her mother who had left the family for another man years before, causing Marina's father to commit suicide. Her troubled childhood has led Marina to seek thrills by playing high-stakes Russian Roulette. It's as the corpses of her defeated adversaries begin to surface, she is assigned to the case.

== Cast ==
- Julio Chávez: Renzo Márquez
- Paola Krum: Laura Santini
- Antonio Birabent: Bruno Costas
- David Masajnik: Martin
- Cecilia Roth: Marina Segal
- Luis Luque: Commissaire Jiménez
- Villanueva Cosse: Marcos Márquez
- Mercedes Scápola: Serena

== Second Series ==
A second season of the series - this one's tagline being: El Final Ahora Tiene Dos Caras ... The End Now Has Two Faces - began airing on HBO Latin America in Argentina (and elsewhere in Latin America), on April 19, 2009. It premiered in the U.S. on HBO on September 22, 2010. As with the first, this series stars Julio Chávez and Cecilia Roth, this time on the trail of a killer played by Leonardo Sbaraglia.
