= Hilda Bernard =

Argentine actress (1920–2022)

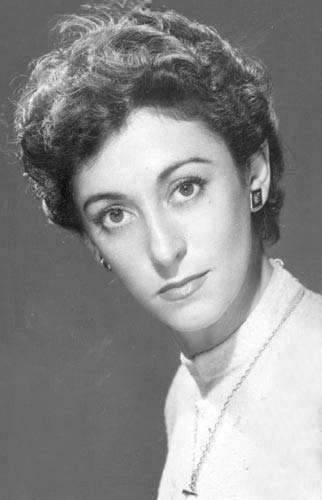
- Bernard in the 1950s
- Born: Hilda Sarah Bernard; 29 October 1920; Puerto Deseado, Argentina
- Died: 20 April 2022 (aged 101); Buenos Aires, Argentina
- Occupation: Actress
- Years active: 1941–2022
- Spouses: Jorge Gonçalvez; Horacio Zelada
- Children: 1

Hilda Sarah Bernard (29 October 1920 – 20 April 2022) was an Argentine actress. She had an extensive career on television, film, stage, and radio.

== Biography ==
=== Early career ===
Bernard was born in Puerto Deseado, Santa Cruz Province, Argentina. She is the daughter of an English father and Austrian mother, Hilda had two siblings: Raquel and Jorge, who went on to play professional rugby. After graduating from high school, a young Hilda attended the National Conservatory of Dramatic Art; but she soon decided to leave the school, opting to begin to study acting under the tutelage of such now legendary Argentine playwrights/acting coaches as actor and director Antonio Cunill Cabanellas and actress María Rosa Gallo. In 1941, a young Hilda appeared in her first job as a member of the Cervantes National Theater, first as a pastry saleswoman in the play Martín Fierro, also appearing as a 'young lady' directed by Orestes Caviglia or Enrique de Rosas.

In 1942, Bernard entered the world of radio, signing on with the Radio El Mundo network, where she appeared in several serials acting with actors such as Oscar Casco, Eduardo Rudy, and Fernando Siro. Her voice gained further recognition in programs such as No quiero vivir así and Alguien para querer. She first starred in Argentine cinema in 1952, in Don Napy's Mala Gente. In the early years of Argentine television she appeared in Esos que dicen amarse, a production directed by Alberto Migré that gained great media interest and culminated in a national tour promoting the show.

=== 1960s–1980s ===
Her extensive career in Argentine television began in earnest in the 1960s, when she appeared in Argentine TV productions such as The Constant Suicides (1961) and Your Favorite Comedy (1965). Her later television work for Alberto Migré included: Women In Prison (1967); Italian Girl Comes To Marry (1969); High Comedy (1971), directed by María Herminia Avellaneda; and Malevo (1972).

She also made a successful transition to theatre productions, among others appearing in Amanda Viale. Years later, in 1976, she appeared in a TV version of the play Love Has A Female Face, which was not as successful as a prior production. After working on several different television networks, she appeared with actress Amelia Bence in The 24 Hours, a successful program that aired from 1981 to 1985, which was produced by the company Proartel S.A..

In the theatre she took part in works such as Cuarteto, Fetiche (Fetish), Women For Identity, One Hundred Years Of Belgrano, and The Last Encounter, among others. She also appeared in 20 films, among them Vení conmigo (1973); the popular picaresque comedy Autocine Mon amour (1972); Enigma de mujer (1956); Historia de una soga (as a voice actress), with Susana Campos; and Mala Gente. She co-starred with other Argentine leading ladies such as Chela Ruíz and Betiana Blum. Her work in television during the 1980s included roles such as Ana (El camionero y la dama), Amelia (María de nadie), Giovanna (Mujer comprada), and Feliciana (Pasiones).

=== Later career ===
Beginning in the early 1990s, Bernard began appearing in acting roles more suited to her age and was called to appear in several episodes of TV series such as Celeste, in 172 episodes opposite actress Andrea del Boca. Following Celeste, she starred as Elisabetta di Velletra in Cosecharás tu siembra (You Reap What You Sow), (1991); and as Madame Guerrero in Manuela, which was shot in Italy.

Bernard participated in a children's series, Cris Morena's Chiquititas, which ran from 1995 to 2001, and in Damián Szifrón's The Simulators. Morena later directed her in Rebelde Way (2002–2003) and Floricienta (2004–2005), both of which were viewed by millions of people and gained the aging Hilda Bernard new-found popularity with young children; Floricienta also won her a Martín Fierro Award in 2003. In 1999, she was presented at the Larreta Museum in Belgrano and starred in Bien de amores (Well Of Love), with actress Silvina Bosco, and a supporting role in Las de Barranco (Barranco's) appearing in a supporting role alongside Victoria Carreras at the Cervantes National Theatre. One of her last film roles was with Norma Aleandro in Jorge Gaggero's acclaimed tragedy, Live-In Maid.

In 2005, at the age of 84, Hilda was contracted to make an appearance in When You Completely Die, playing the part of an old hippie in the Chacarera Theatre. That same year she returned to television in the soap opera Se dice de amor, with actor Juan Darthés and actress Eugenia Tobal, with highly favorable critical reviews. In 2007, she appeared in Fetiche, a 90-minute bio-drama written by Jose María Muscari, and which was performed live at the Teatro Sarmiento. In 2004, she began making appearances in the Argentinian TV version of the successful CBS sitcom The Nanny called La Niñera, which also featured actress Florencia Peña. On the program she appears as the mother of actress Mercedes Morán's 'Fran Fine' typecasted character.

She also appeared in 12 episodes of The Successful Pells, on Telefé (other versions were aired in Mexico and other parts of South America, but with a different title) and Dromo, a fantasy-terror production.

She was nominated for the Martín Fierro Award as Best Actress in a TV Film and/or Miniseries for her work in Dromo, playing the part of the mentally ill mother of actress Chunchuna Villafañe. In 2010, Hilda was honored by the Municipality at a ceremony held at the Teatro Roma, earning the María Guerrero Lifetime Achievement Award. On 6 May 2010, she performed at the historic Teatro, which was shown on the Telefé channel, where she impersonated tango singer Ada Falcón.

== Personal life and death ==
Bernard was married to the producer, writer and director Jorge Gonçalvez; and to Horacio Zelada, who was president of the Argentina Association of Broadcasters. She has a daughter, Patricia, three grandchildren and one great-grandchild.

In 2011, Bernard, at 90 years old, continued to work and stayed in shape. She cycled three times a week, took regular walks outdoors and regularly read novels, while working on and studying scripts, as she was quoted as a reporter in an interview conducted by the news Telenoche. She further stated, "I will live for many years." In October 2010, after the death of the young actress Romina Yan, who died of a heart attack in September 2010, Bernard, who had worked with Yan, cried while speaking to the media. Appearing inconsolable, she said, "Life is not fair, It should have killed me. I am 90; but not Romina, she was very young and had three children, this is not fair."

Bernard reappeared on television in 2012 as part of the cast of Intertwined, a series aired on Telefé.

She recovered from a stroke in 2014, with no major recurrences, and survived COVID-19 in 2020. Bernard died on 20 April 2022, at the age of 101.

== Filmography ==
- 1952: Mala gente
- 1956: Historia de una soga
- 1956: Enigma de mujer
- 1961: Los suicidios constantes (TV Serie, 19 episodes)
- 1961: Obras maestras Philco (TV Mini-Series, 2 episodes)
- 1964: Teleteatro Palmolive del aire (TV Series, 1 episode)
- 1964: Romeo y... Raquel!!! (TV Series, 3 episodes)
- 1965: Su comedia favorita (TV Series)
- 1967: Mujeres en presidio (TV Series, 19 episodes)
- 1967: Lo mejor de nuestra vida... nuestros hijos (TV Series, 39 episodes)
- 1968: 0597 da ocupado (TV Series)
- 1969: Muchacha italiana viene a casarse (TV Series, 29 episodes)
- 1970: Uno entre nosotros (TV Series, 19 episodes)
- 1970: La escopeta (TV Series, 19 episodes)
- 1971: Nosotros también reímos (TV Series, 18 episodes)
- 1971: Alta comedia: El avaro (TV Movie)
- 1972: No quiero tu compasión (TV Series, 19 episodes)
- 1972: Autocine mon amour
- 1972-1973: Malevo (TV Series, 272 episodes)
- 1973: Lo mejor de nuestra vida... nuestros hijos (TV Series, 16 episodes)
- 1970-1973: Alta comedia (TV Series, 4 episodes)
- 1973: Vení conmigo
- 1974: La flor de la mafia
- 1976: El amor tiene cara de mujern (TV Series 1976, 17 episodes)
- 1978: Un mundo de veinte asientos (TV Series 1978, 19 episodes)
- 1980: Rosa... de lejos (TV Series, 58 episodes)
- 1980: Días de ilusión
- 1981: Un latido distinto (TV Series 19 episodes)
- 1981: Laura mía (TV Series, 19 episodes)
- 1981: Six Tickets to Hell
- 1982: Silencio de amor (TV Series, 19 episodes)
- 1982: Los especiales de ATC (TV Series, 1 episode)
- 1982: Las 24 horas (TV Series, 1 episode)
- 1982: Después del final (TV Series, 19 episodes)
- 1983: La sociedad conyugal (TV Series, 19 episodes)
- 1984: Tal como somos (TV Series, 125 episodes)
- 1984: La pobre Clara (TV Series, 160 episodes)
- 1984: Dar el alma (TV Series, 29 episodes)
- 1985: Marina de noche (TV Series 19 episodes)
- 1985: María de nadie (TV Series, 219 episodes)
- 1985: El camionero y la dama (TV Series 1985, 29 episodes)
- 1985: Momento de incertidumbre (TV Series 1985, 2 episodes)
- 1986: Mujer comprada (TV Series, 139 episodes)
- 1986: Diapasón
- 1986: Pasiones (TV Series, 160 episodes)
- 1989: The Strange Lady (TV Series, 120 episodes)
- 1989: Corps perdus (nicht ausgestrahlt)
- 1991: Pasión (TV Series, 28 episodes)
- 1991: Manuela (TV Series, 228 episodes)
- 1991: Antonella (TV Series, 191 episodes)
- 1991: Alta comedia (TV Series)
- 1991: Celeste (TV Series, 1 episode)
- 1991: Cosecharás tu siembra (TV Series 1991, 25 episodes)
- 1992: Soy Gina (TV Series, 19 episodes)
- 1992: Cuatro caras para Victoria
- 1993: Celeste, siempre Celeste (TV Series 1993)
- 1993: Amanda Sadowska (3 episodes
- 1993: Casi todo, casi nada (TV Series, 29 episodes)
- 1995-1997: Chiquititas (TV Series, 520 episodes)
- 1998: Alas, poder y pasión (TV Series, 120 episodes)
- 1998: The VideoMatch Show (TV Series, 1 episode)
- 1999: Sweet Lucia (TV Series, 39 episodes)
- 1999: Mamitas (TV Series, 27 episodes)
- 2001: Los médicos (de hoy) 2 (TV Series 2001, 65 episodes)
- 2001: Las amantes (TV Series, 19 episodes)
- 2001: Animalada
- 2002: Sin intervalo
- 2002: Pretenders (TV Series, 1 episode)
- 2002: Final Minute (TV Series, 1 episode)
- 2002: !!Rebel's Way (TV Series, 130 episodes)
- 2004: La niñera (TV Series, 81 episodes)
- 2004: Live-In Maid
- 2004: Jennifer's Shadow
- 2004: Los inquilinos del infierno
- 2004-2005: Flinderella (TV Series, 138 episodes)
- 2005: El patrón de la vereda (TV Series, 150 episodes)
- 2006: Collar de esmeraldas (TV Series, 121 episodes)
- 2005-2006: Se dice amor (TV Series 255 episodes)
- 2008: Los exitosos Pells (TV Series 2008, 77 episodes)
- 2008: Socias (TV Series, 1 episode)
- 2009: The Call
- 2009 Dromo (TV Mini-Series, 2 episodes)
- 2010: Lo que el tiempo nos dejó (TV Mini-Series 2010, 1 episode)
- 2010: Neighbours
- 2011: Historias de la primera vez (TV Mini-Series, 1 episode)
- 2011: Decisiones de vida (TV Mini-Series, 1 episode)
- 2012: El Tabarís, lleno de estrellas (TV Movie)
