= Jorge Nisco =

- Born: Jorge Nisco; 6 March 1956 (age 70); Bernal, Buenos Aires
- Occupations: Director and Assistant director
- Years active: 1997-Present

Jorge Nisco (born March 6, 1956, in Bernal, Buenos Aires) is an Argentine director and assistant director best known for Killer Women (2005), Epitafios (2004), and Malparida (2010).

== Career ==
Jorge Nisco started his career in 1997, when he met actor Adrián Suar, who pitched him an idea for a TV show called "R.R.D.T.". The show starred name actors Carlos Calvo, China Zorrilla, José "Pepe" Soriano, Nancy Dupláa, and Diego Peretti, and brought Nisco to prominence in the Argentine film industry. That very same year, he directed his first and so far only film, Comodines, based on another of Suar's "ideas," as he is thus credited. The movie reunited most of the cast of "R.R.D.T.", with Suar and Calvo in the leads, as well as veteran character actor Alejandro Awada.

In 1999, Nisco directed his first mini-series, El Hombre, which also spun off an original idea by Suar. Adrián Suar would go on to collaborate with his "original ideas" in 10 of the 13 TV series and mini-series Nisco directed from 1999 to 2007, occasionally acting in them as well.

In 2002, Nisco was credited as "second unit director" in the series "Son Amores", which starred Adrián Suar. In 2004, Nisco co-directed, along with Alberto Lecchi, Epitafios, a 13-episode mini-series starring Julio Chávez, Paola Krum, and Cecilia Roth. It was the first original series produced by HBO and HBO Latin America.

In 2005, Jorge Nisco created his own production of content and formats of fiction, "Quark content", with his partner, the script editor and writer Ramiro San Honorio.] Nisco started working in 2007 for several local chains, including Film and Television, Televisa, and Fox Television Studios to develop formats and scripts. In 2008, he filmed his second film version of Disney's success in Argentina, "High School Musical: The Challenge," making it another great box office success of his first film.

Nisco's comedy film Checkmate premiered in 2024.
