= Tzachi Halevy =

Israeli actor and singer (born 1975)

- צחי הלוי
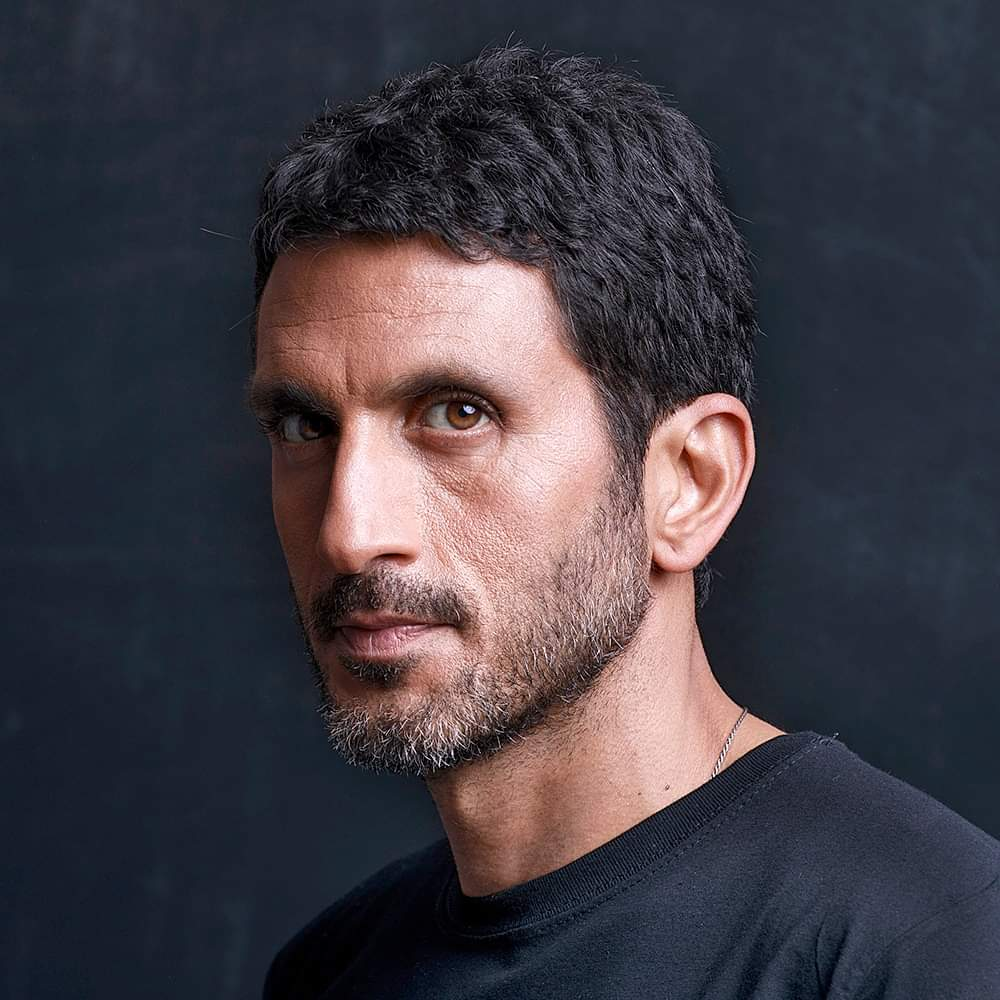
- HaLevy in 2018
- Born: 12 March 1975 (age 51); Petah Tikva, Israel
- Occupations: Actor, musician
- Years active: 1999–present
- Spouses: Una Holbrook (divorced) Lucy Aharish (m. 2018)
- Children: 2

Tzachi Halevy (or Tsahi HaLevi; Hebrew: צחי הלוי; born 12 March 1975) is an Israeli film and television actor and singer.

== Early and personal life ==
HaLevi was born and raised in Petah Tikva, Israel, to an Israeli family of both Sephardi Jewish and Mizrahi Jewish descent. His father was an 8th generation Sabra, whereas his mother is of Moroccan-Jewish origin. As a child, he lived in many countries due to his father's work in the Israeli Prime Minister's Office. During his military service in the IDF, he served in both Samson and Duvdevan; both undercover special forces units. He is fluent in Hebrew, Arabic, French, Spanish and English.

Halevy has resided in Tel Aviv since the late 1990s. He is divorced from the Israeli dancer Una Holbrook, with whom he has a son. He married Arab-Israeli news anchor Lucy Aharish in a private ceremony on 10 October 2018, after a four-year relationship he kept secret due to fear of harassment. He received criticism from many for his "non-Jewish intermarriage", but others congratulated them. Aharish gave birth to their son in March 2021.

== Career ==
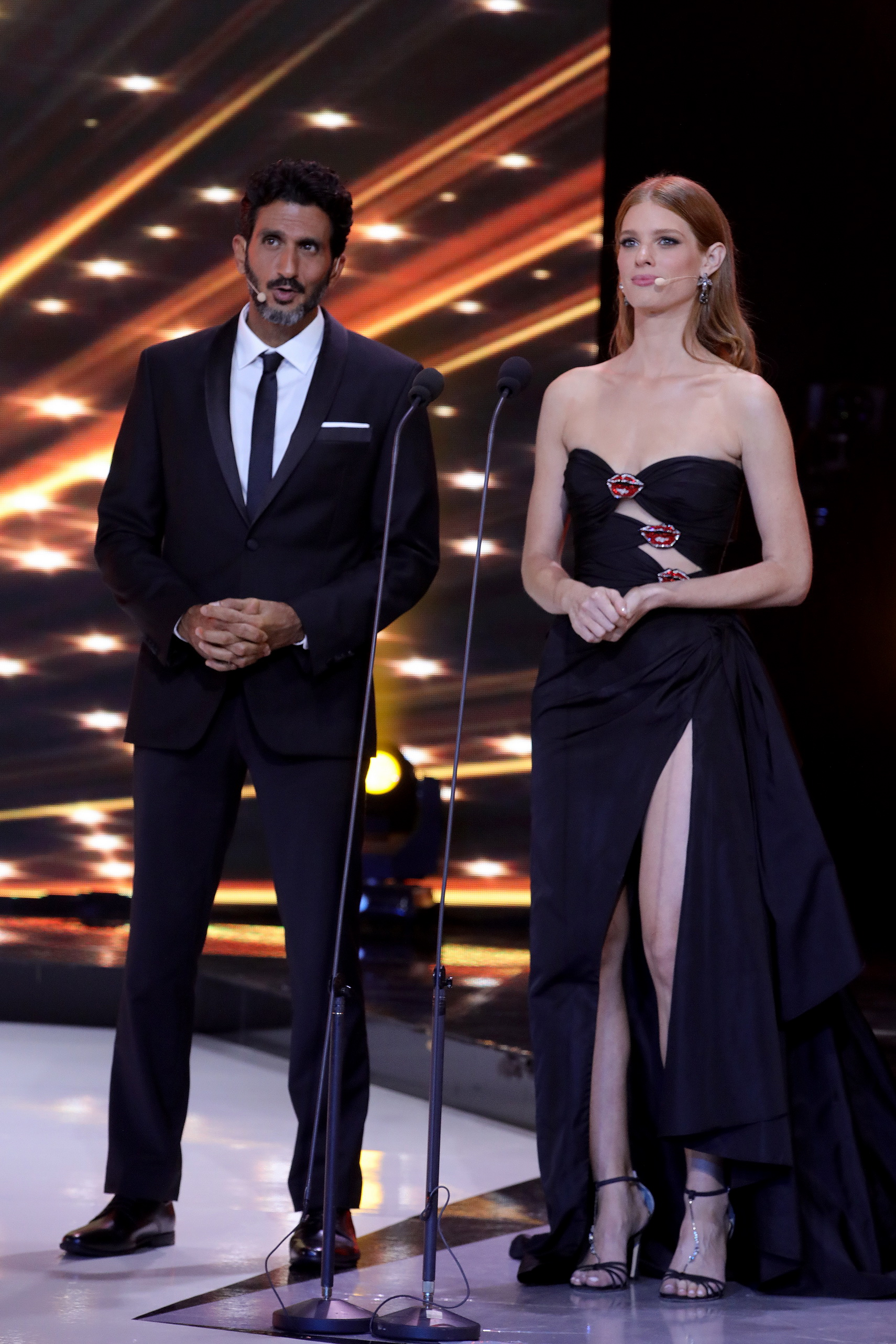
Tzachi Halevy and Yuval Scharf (right) hosting the 2019 Ophir Awards

=== Music ===
Halevy has been a member of the Mayumana troupe that combines dance, song, and percussion since 1999.

Halevy's breakthrough came in 2012, when he took part in the first season of the reality show The Voice Israel under mentor Shlomi Shabat. He reached the final but did not win. After appearing on The Voice, he began working on his first album "Kivvunim" ("Directions"), which was released in 2012. In 2014, he collaborated with Idan Raichel and wrote the French song "Petit Roi". In 2015, he released the single "Tamali Ma'aek, a cover of an Arabic song he performed during the shooting of Fauda.

In December 2020, Halevy won the first season of The Singer in the Mask, the Israeli production of The Masked Singer as The Rooster. Among his fellow contestants was his wife Lucy, who performed as The Stork.

=== Acting ===
In 2012, Halevy began his acting career, appearing on plays at Habima Theatre and Haifa Theater.

In 2013, Halevy starred in the drama film Bethlehem, Ophir Award winner for best picture. He portrayed 'Razi', a Shin Bet agent, and won an Ophir Award for Best Supporting Actor for his performance.

In 2014, he portrayed 'Shlomi Daddon' on the Hot 3 television series Metim LeRega alongside Agam Rudberg, Ofer Shechter, and Yuval Segal. That year, he also appeared on Betulot as 'Haim Toledano', and worked alongside Sasson Gabai and Maggie Azarzar.

In February 2015, the political-thriller television series Fauda first aired on 'yes'. In it Halevy portrays 'Naor', a member of a Mista'arvim unit. He later appeared in the 2015 drama film The Kind Words as 'Ricky.'

In 2016, Halevy played a small role on Channel 10's drama television series Hostages. In 2017, he appeared on the second season of the television action series Mossad 101 as 'Liron Harriri', the head of a crime family, and on HOT's Full Moon as 'Baruch'. In 2018, he appeared as Ephraim in Mary Magdalene, written by Helen Edmundson and directed by Garth Davis.

== Filmography ==
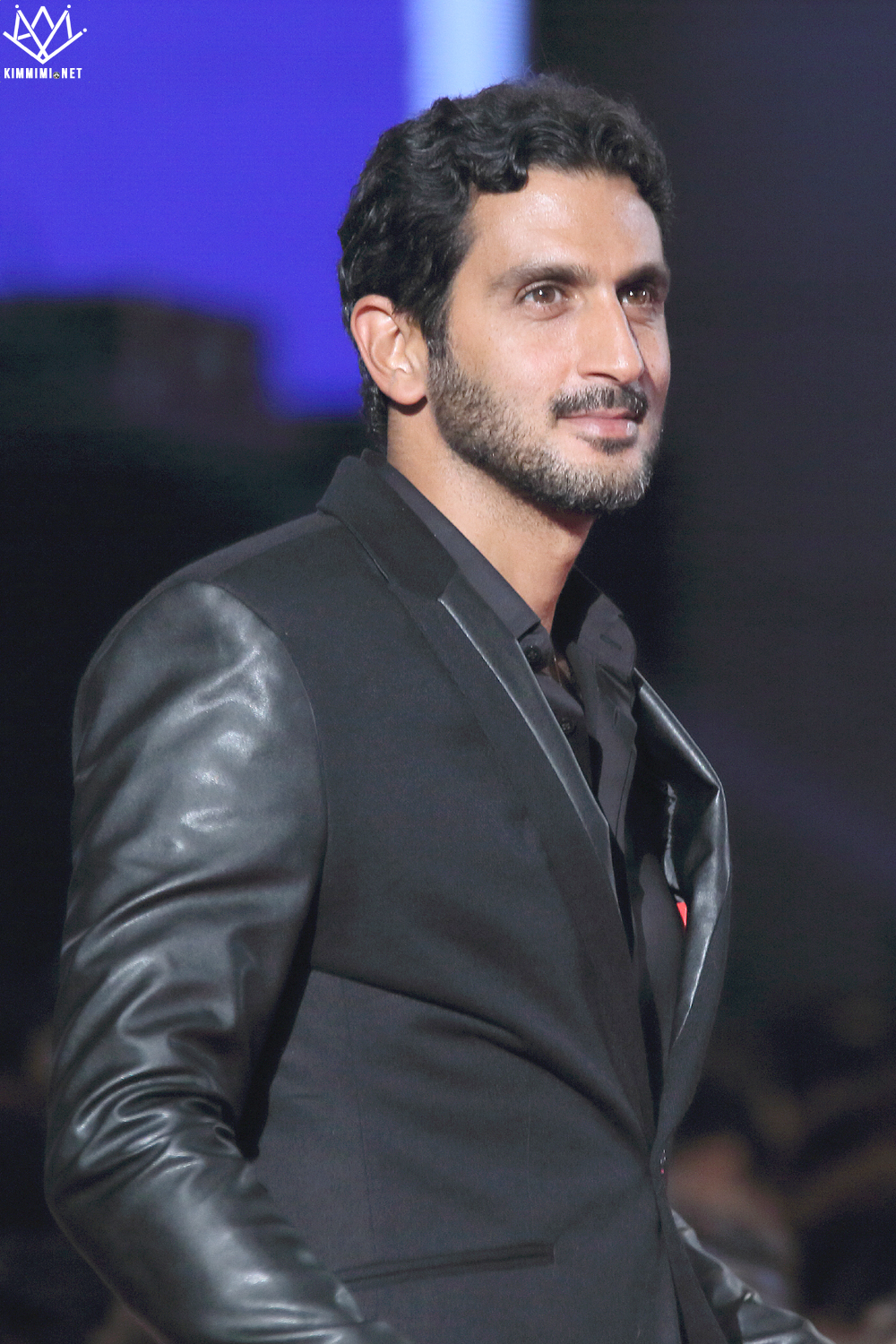
Halevy in 2015

=== Films ===
Year	Title	Role	Notes
2013	Bethlehem	Razi	
2015	The Kind Words	Ricki Cohen	
2017	Cracks		Short
2017	Outdoors (Bayit Bagalil)		
2017	Damascus Cover	Rami Elon	
2017	Domino Street	Phadi	Short
2018	Mary Magdalene	Ephraim	
2018	Neither shore nor dove	L'homme	
2018	Echo (Hed)	Shay	
2018	The Angel	Colonel Gaddafi	
2018	Terror (Pigua)		Short
2018	Herzl's Susita (HaSusita Shel Herzl)		
2019	All in	Yaki	
2019	Mossad	Guy Moran	
2019	Forgiveness (Mechila)		
2020	Laila in Haifa	Gil	
2020	Cinema Rex	Meir	Short
2022	A Brush with Death (HaMossad Met Mitzhok)	Uri Amir	Short
2022	Silent (HaShtika)		
2022	My Name is Claire		Short
2023	Let the Party Begin	Gadi Harush	
2023	The Engineer	Gili	
2023	Akelli	Assad	Hindi film
2023	Be'Emtsa Hachayim	Yonatan	
2024	Checkmate (Jaque mate)	Yair	

=== Television ===
Year	Title	Role	Notes
2014 - 2017	Temporarily Dead (Metim LeRega)	Shlomi Dadon	Series regular
2014 - 2019	Sirens (Bayit Bagalil)	Haim Toledano	Series regular
2015	Dig	Udi	4 episodes
2015 - 2022	Fauda	Naor	Series regular
2016	Hostages (Bnei Aruba)	Sheikh	
2017	Full Moon	Baruch	
2019	Sisters (HaAchayot HaMutzlachot Sheli)	Gadi	
2019	Forever	Nicola	Series regular
2019	The Grave (BaYom SheHaAdama Raada)	Gabi	Series regular
2021	The Cops (HaShotrim), AKA Line in the Sand	Alon Shenhav	Series regular
2021	The Women's Balcony	Kobi (Jackie) Felisian	Series regular
2021	PMTA	Yoav Zamir	8 episodes
2021	Motek Bool BaEmtza	Amos Abuksis	Short
2023	Kapningen	Saïd Khelfi	Series regular Swedish series
2026	Rokdim Im Kokhavim	Himself	Contestant (Season 12)
