= Humberto Costantini =

Argentine writer and poet

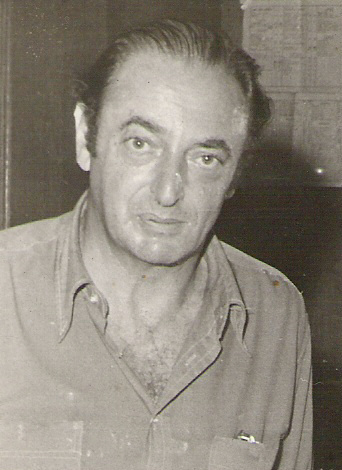
- Born: April 8, 1924; Buenos Aires, Argentina
- Died: June 7, 1987 (aged 63); Buenos Aires, Argentina
- Children: 3

Humberto "Cacho" Costantini (April 8, 1924 – June 7, 1987) was an Argentine writer and poet whose work was influenced by Buenos Aires slang (porteño).

== Biography ==
Costantini was born in Buenos Aires, the only child of Italian Jewish immigrants who lived in the barrio of Villa Pueyrredon. He married Nela Nur Fernandez and the couple had three children, Violeta, Ana and Daniel († 2022). A medical veterinarian, he practiced near the city of Lobería, Buenos Aires Province. In 1955, he returned to the city of Buenos Aires where he worked in various jobs: veterinarian, salesman, potter, and medical researcher. Meanwhile, he worked tirelessly in off-hours, "nailed to the chair" as he said, writing and rewriting his novels.

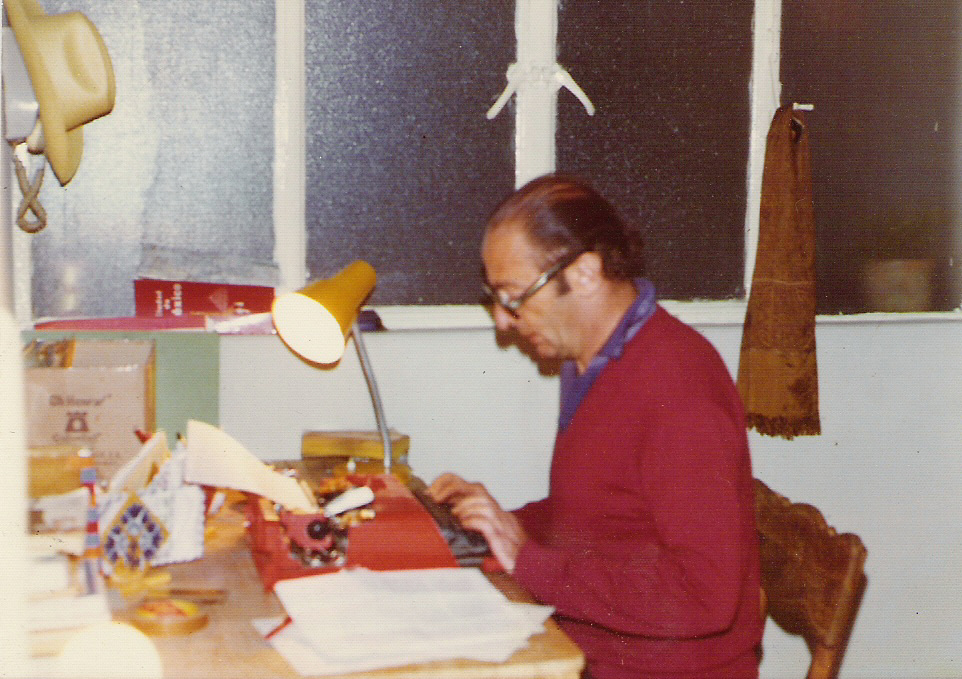
Humberto Costantini working "nailed to the chair"

Costantini was politically active from his youth. In his student days he confronted the Fascists of the Alianza Libertadora Nacionalista and was a member of the Communist Party until serious differences of opinion with the bureaucratic and pro-Soviet leadership caused him to leave it. He greatly admired Ernesto Che Guevara. In the 1970s he was actively engaged with the revolutionary left and was on official blacklists.

In 1976, Costantini was forced into exile in Mexico where he continued writing. He suffered in an exile that obliged him "to glance through the lists for his loved ones, as if the city had been hit with a typhoon." He conducted narrative workshops regularly, made programs for radio and for television, and he fell in love. As he said on his return: "In short, I lived." Costantini returned to Buenos Aires in 1983 after seven years, seven months and seven days in exile.

An admirer of Osvaldo Pugliese, Anibal Troilo ("Pichuco"), and Eduardo Arolas, Constantini was a Tango singer, dancer, and amateur historian. He also composed milongas and tangos, some of which were published and recorded.

Costantini died on the morning of 7 June 1987 following an on-going case of cancer. The night before, he worked on the final novel of his trilogy, La Rhapsodía de Raquel Liberman. This work remains unpublished.

== Works ==
Costantini's oeuvre included short stories, poetry, plays, novels, and radio programs. His first book of stories, De Por Aquí Nomás, was published in 1958. His novel De Dioses, Hombrecitos y Policías (The Gods, The Little Guys and the Police), written while in hiding from the dictatorial government, was awarded the Casa de Las Américas Prize. His unfinished work, Rapsodía de Raquel Liberman, recounts the exploits of a Jewish prostitute enslaved by the sinister organization Zwi Migdal who ultimately leaves that life behind her. This work shows a fundamental theme of Costani's: "To do what is right in the eyes of Jehova, meaning to fulfill one's destiny."

Julio Cortázar respected Costantini's work: "I love what Humberto Costantini does, and am full of confidence in his work. He is, for me, a very important writer."

In addition to English and Costantini's native Spanish, his works have been translated into many languages including Czech, English, Finnish, German, Hebrew, Polish, Russian and Swedish, among others.

== Bibliography ==
- De por aquí nomás (short stories) editions in 1958/1965/1969
- Un señor alto, rubio de bigotes (short stories) editions in 1963/1969/1972
- Tres monólogos (theater play) editions in 1964/1969
- Cuestiones con la vida (poems) editions in 1966/1970/1976/1982/1986
- Una vieja historia de caminantes (short stories) edition in 1970
- Háblenme de Funes (three short novels) editions in 1970/1980
- Libro de Trelew (epic narration) edition in 1970
- Más cuestiones con la vida (poems) edition in 1974
- Bandeo (short stories) editions in 1975/1980
- De Dioses, hombrecitos y policías (novel) editions in 1979/1984
- Una pipa larga, larga, con cabeza de jabalí (theater play) edition in 1981
- Eli, Eli, Lamma Sabajtani edition in 1983
- La larga noche de Francisco Sanctis (novel) edition in 1984
- En la noche (short stories) edition in 1985
- Chau, Pericles (theater play) edition in 1986
- Rapsodia de Raquel Liberman (novel/trilogy; two of three parts completed; 1987) unpublished

=== Literary criticism ===
- Al sur de casi todo. Humberto Costantini y su obra. (Hernán Fontanet, Buenos Aires, Argentina: Universidad Pedagógica Provincial, 2017.) ISBN 9789873805226.
- In Praise of Tears: The Quest for Identity in Humberto Costantini's Poetry. (Hernán Fontanet, Porto Alegre, Brazil: Editoria da Pontifícia Universidade Católica do Rio Grande do Sul, 2016.) ISBN 9788539707607.
