= Just One Spring =

- Theatrical release poster
- Directed by: Joaquín Pedretti
- Written by: Joaquín Pedretti; Liz María Haedo; Milda Rivarola
- Produced by: Lucía Alcain; Gabriela Sabaté; Cynthia García Calvo; Joaquín Pedretti
- Starring: Majo Cabrera
- Cinematography: Guillermo Rovira
- Edited by: Joaquín Pedretti; Verónica Seniquel
- Production companies: Productora de la tierra Sabate Films; Cyan Producciones
- Release date: September 19, 2024
- Running time: 99 minutes
- Countries: Paraguay; Argentina; Chile
- Languages: Spanish; Guaraní

Just One Spring (Spanish: Una sola primavera) is a 2024 drama film co-written, co-produced, and directed by Joaquín Pedretti. The film stars Majo Cabrera, alongside Salma Vera, Ever Enciso, and Miguel Romero. It tells the story of a woman who fights for her revolutionary ideals during the Paraguayan Civil War but is ultimately forced to leave the country. The film is a co-production between Paraguay, Argentina, and Chile.

== Synopsis ==
Nina, a young 20-year-old woman, lives in Asunción in 1947, during the Paraguayan Civil War. She dreams of becoming a singer but is forced to work as a maid in a conservative environment after her family flees. Despite this, she dedicates herself to the revolution, helping to free various political prisoners, including Raúl, with whom she begins an affair. However, after becoming pregnant and being abandoned by her lover, she is forced to flee the country.

== Cast ==
- Majo Cabrera as Nina
- Salma Vera
- Ever Enciso
- Miguel Romero
- Mauricio Paniagua
- Sonia Tiranti

== Production ==
Principal photography was planned to begin in mid-2020, but was not carried out due to the COVID-19 pandemic. Finally, it was filmed in mid-2021 in Corrientes, Argentina.

== Release ==
It premiered on September 19, 2024, in Paraguayan theaters.
