= Andrea del Boca =

Argentine telenovela actress

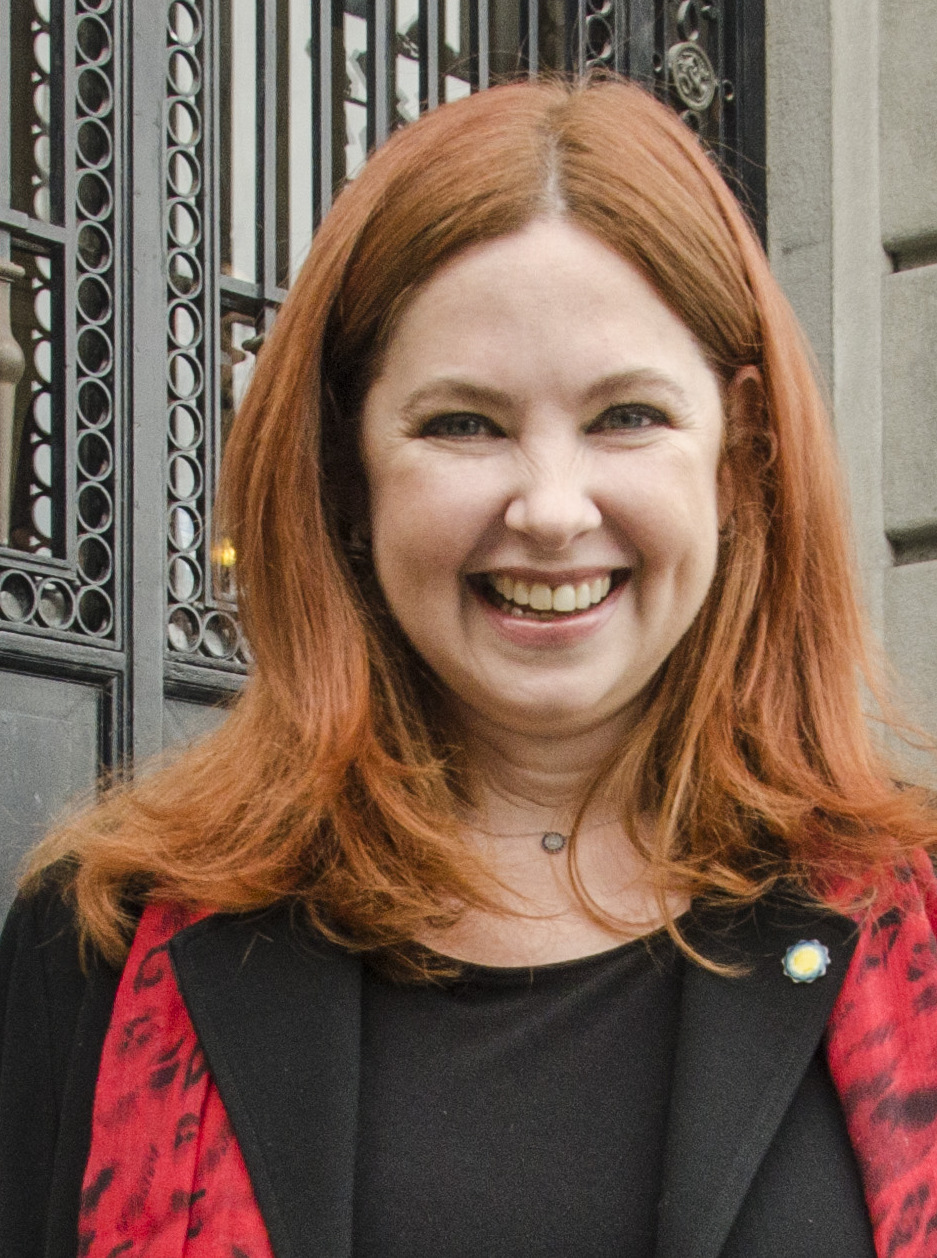
- Andrea del Boca in 2015
- Born: 18 October 1965 (age 60); Buenos Aires, Argentina
- Occupations: Actress, singer
- Years active: 1969–present
- Partner(s): Silvestre (1982–1987); Raúl de la Torre (1988–1995); Jeffrey A. Sachs (1995–1997)
- Children: Anna Chiara Biasotti Del Boca (b. 2000)

Andrea del Boca (born 18 October 1965 in Buenos Aires) is an Argentine actress and singer. She began her career as a child actress and subsequently became popular in the 1980s and 1990s for her roles in telenovelas, such as Estrellita mía, Celeste, Antonella and Perla negra. She has also appeared in numerous films and several theatre productions. Del Boca has won three Martín Fierro Awards.

== Career ==
Del Boca made her debut as a four-year-old in the TV series Nuestra galleguita where she played a deaf-mute girl. In 1970, she started to play in the series Alta comedia and won the prestigious Martín Fierro Award for 1971 in the Revelación category, an equivalent of the Best New Artist. In 1972, she appeared in her first film, Había una vez un circo, alongside a trio of popular clowns called Los Payasos de la Tele. She achieved a wide popularity in Argentina at the age of seven when she played the part of a little orphan Pinina in Papá corazón on Canal 13 in 1973. In the same year she appeared in the film Andrea, followed by a film adaptation of Papá corazón in 1974, Papá Corazón se quiere casar, and Un mundo de amor (A World of Love) in 1975.

From 1979 to 1980 she played the leading role in the telenovela Andrea Celeste with Alberto Argibay, Ana María Picchio and Raúl Taibo, and subsequently in Señorita Andrea, both broadcast on Argentine public television ATC. In the same year, she released her first music album. She then appeared in a number of TV miniseries on ATC throughout 1981. In 1982, she played the lead in Cien días de Ana alongside actor and singer Silvestre, and relocated to New York to study acting. In the following years, she took part in several theatrical productions.

In 1987, she returned in the telenovela Estrellita mía on the Telefe network, with Ricardo Darín as her partner. She recorded two music albums for Warner Music Group, Con amor and Te amo, released in 1988 and 1989, respectively. In 1991, Del Boca played the title role in Celeste on Canal 13, alongside Gustavo Bermúdez. The telenovela was one of the precursors in the genre addressing such topics as HIV/AIDS and homosexuality, and was popular with the TV audience. In 1992, she starred in Antonella, again accompanied by Bermúdez. In this series, she contributed the theme song "Para este amor" and portrayed a charismatic heroine, very different from the ones she had played in previous telenovelas. In 1993, she appeared in the film Funes, a Great Love directed by Raúl de la Torre, where she played an alcoholic lesbian prostitute. In the same year, Celeste was resumed as Celeste siempre Celeste, in which Del Boca played a double role: Celeste and her sister, Clara.

In late 1994, she appeared in the telenovela Perla negra on Telefe alongside Argentine sex symbol Gabriel Corrado. It was another success and was popular also internationally. The series featured Del Boca's song "El amor" as the musical theme, taken from her new album of the same name, recorded for Philips Records. Her next film, de la Torre-directed Peperina, was released in 1995, but received negative feedback from the critics. In 1996, Del Boca was reunited with Corrado as the main characters in Zíngara, which also used her song "Tonta, pobre tonta" as the music theme. The telenovela was a story of a young woman experiencing amnesia and being raised as a gypsy, but failed to repeat the success of Del Boca's previous series. Her next telenovela, Mía sólo mía, premiered in 1997, but did not turn out a big success either. Del Boca subsequently limited her television activity and in 1998 only made a guest appearance in the series Chiquititas.

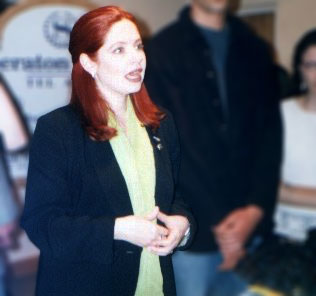
Del Boca in 1999

In 2000, she returned to film in the romantic comedy Apariencias directed by Alberto Lecchi, and from 2001 to 2002, she played the main character in the TV series El sodero de mi vida. Her role in the latter earned her the second Martín Fierro Award, this time for the Best Actress in a Comedy Series. In 2005, she was honoured with a special Martín Fierro Award and played the title role in the telenovela Sálvame María on Canal 9 which was filmed entirely in San Luis Province. The following year she starred in the short series Gladiadores de Pompeya. In 2007, she appeared in one episode of the series Mujeres asesinas and joined the judging panel of a TV show selecting the cast for the Argentine version of High School Musical in which she also played a small role. In 2008, she hosted a popular TV show La mamá del año which revolved around motherhood and joined the series Por amor a vos as a recurring character. She also started presenting another TV show, Hoy puede ser.

In 2010, she starred in the telenovela Alguien que me quiera alongside Osvaldo Laport, but the production did not achieve expected ratings. In 2011, she took part in the theatre play Eva y Victoria in which she portrayed Eva Perón, alongside Graciela Dufau who played Victoria Ocampo. The play was taken on a tour in Argentina. In autumn Del Boca premiered Tiempo de pensar, a TV series she co-produced and starred in, tackling the issue of gender violence, stereotypes and female representation in the media. Between 2013 and 2014, she starred in the telenovela Esa mujer, which she also produced. The role earned her a nomination to a Martín Fierro Award.

In 2016, it was reported that Del Boca had acquired as much as 36 million Argentine pesos from public funds to produce her next telenovela, Mamá corazón. It caused a major controversy and a backlash against the actress, and even though the series was almost completed, it was never aired. In 2019, she appeared in another theatre play, Brujas, with Leonora Balcarce, Andrea Bonelli, Romina Ricci and Viviana Saccone, which was a critical and commercial success.

== Personal life ==
Her parents are the actress and dancer Ana María Castro and the film director Nicolás del Boca. She has two siblings: brother Adrián, working as a doctor in the United States, and sister Anabella who is a costume designer.

In 1982, she began a five-year relationship with Argentine actor and singer Silvestre (José Luis Rodríguez, not to be confused with the Venezuelan singer of the same name) whom she had met while working on the series Cien días de Ana. Their relationship sparked controversy as Silvestre was 12 years older than Andrea who was still underage. Moreover, Silvestre was married at that time and his wife was pregnant. From 1988 to 1995 Andrea's partner was Argentine filmmaker Raúl de la Torre, and from 1995 to 1997 she was involved with American health care policy expert Jeffrey Sachs. In 2000, the actress was briefly dating the businessman Ricardo Biasotti and gave birth to their daughter Anna Chiara Biasotti on 15 November 2000.

She is a supporter of Cristina Fernández de Kirchner.

== Filmography ==
=== TV series ===
- 1969: Nuestra galleguita
- 1970: Historias de mamá y papá
- 1970–1972: Alta comedia
- 1973: Papá corazón
- 1974: Pinina quiere a papá
- 1977: El gran circo de TVE (guest appearance)
- 1978–1979: El hotel de las mil y una estrellas
- 1979–1980: Andrea Celeste
- 1980: Señorita Andrea
- 1981: Romeo y Julieta
- 1981: Bernadette
- 1981: Hay que educar a papá
- 1981: Abuso de confianza
- 1981: Una vida por otra
- 1982: Cien días de Ana
- 1987: Estrellita mía
- 1991: Celeste
- 1992: Antonella
- 1993: Celeste, siempre Celeste
- 1994–1995: Perla negra
- 1996: Zíngara
- 1997: Mía sólo mía
- 1998: Chiquititas (guest appearance)
- 2001–2002: El sodero de mi vida
- 2005: Sálvame María
- 2006: Gladiadores de Pompeya
- 2007: Mujeres asesinas (guest appearance)
- 2008–2009: Por amor a vos
- 2010: Alguien que me quiera
- 2011: Tiempo de pensar
- 2013–2014: Esa mujer
- 2021: Perla Negra 2.0

=== Films ===
- 1972: Había una vez un circo
- 1973: Andrea
- 1974: Papá Corazón se quiere casar
- 1975: Un mundo de amor
- 1979: El virgo de Visanteta
- 1980: Días de ilusión
- 1990: Cien veces no debo
- 1993: Funes, un gran amor
- 1995: Peperina
- 2000: Apariencias
- 2008: High School Musical: El Desafío
- 2010: Mercedes (short film)
- 2010: Un buen día
- 2012: Haciendo sueños (documentary)

=== TV shows ===
- 2007: High School Musical: La Selección
- 2008: La mamá del año
- 2008–2009: Hoy puede ser

== Discography ==
=== Albums ===
- 1980: El mundo de Andrea Del Boca
- 1988: Con amor
- 1989: Te amo
- 1994: El amor

=== Singles ===
- 1972: "El milagro de ser mamá" (with Iris Lainez)
- 1973: "Papá corazón"
- 1979: "Mamá quiero decirte gracias"
- 1979: "Feliz Nochebuena, Feliz Navidad"
- 1982: "Perdoname quisiera ser mejor" (with Silvestre)
