= Cecilia Roth =

Argentine actress (born 1956)

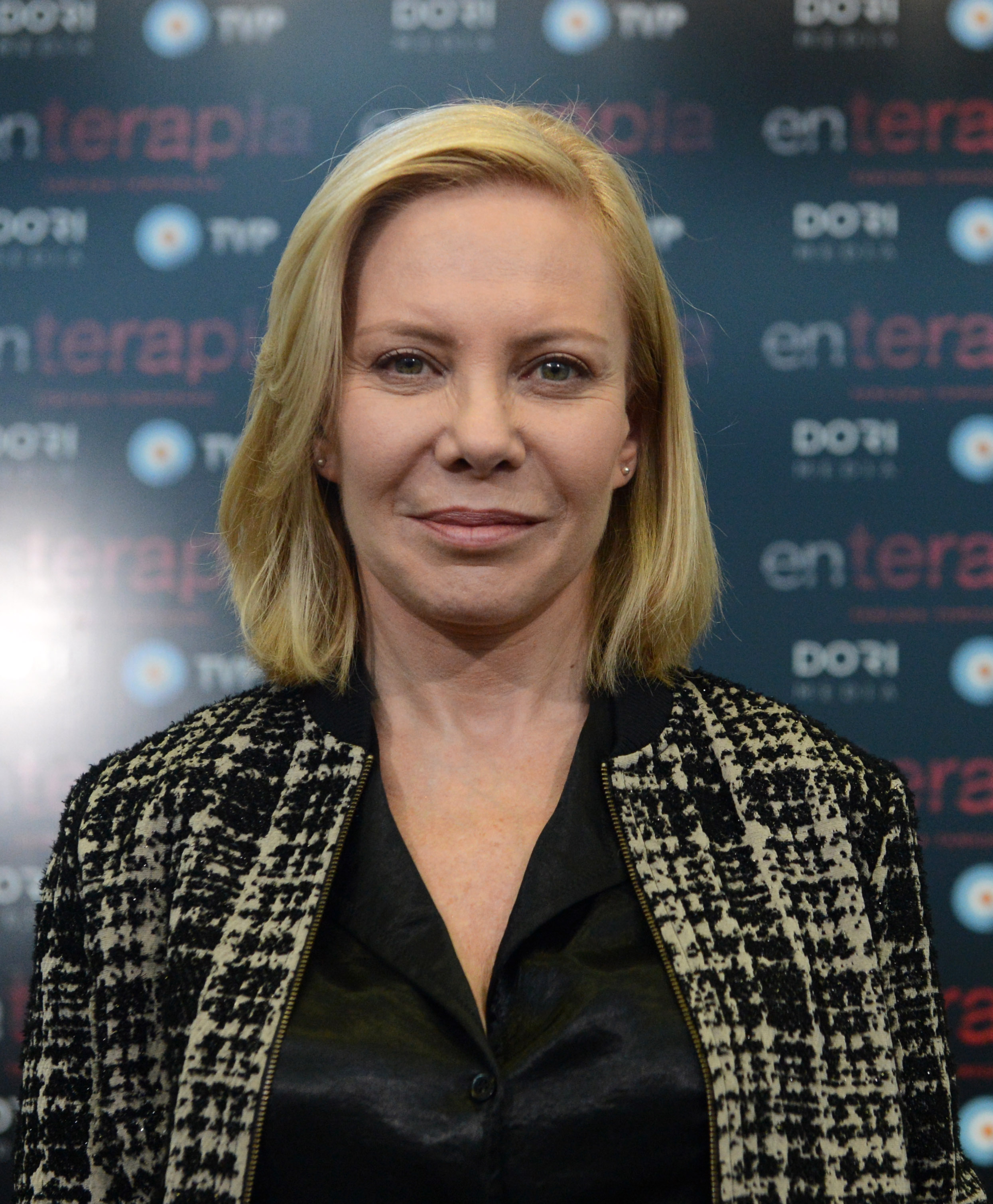
- Roth in 2014
- Born: Cecilia Edith Rotenberg Gutkin; 8 August 1956 (age 70); Buenos Aires, Argentina
- Occupation: Actress
- Years active: 1976–present
- Spouses: Gonzalo Gil (divorced); Fito Páez (m. 1999; div. 2003)
- Children: 1

Cecilia Edith Rotenberg Gutkin (born 8 August 1956), known professionally as Cecilia Roth (Spanish pronunciation: [seˈsilja rot]) is an Argentine actress. She is the winner of two Goya Awards and a European Film Award. She is known for being an "Almodóvar girl" and the "muse" of Fito Páez during the 1990s.

== Life and career ==
Roth's father, Abrasha Rotenberg, is of Ukrainian Jewish origin, having moved in the 1930s to Buenos Aires, where he worked as a writer, editor, and journalist. Cecilia's mother, Dina Gutkin, known as Dina Rot, a singer, was born in Mendoza and spent her childhood in Santiago de Chile. Her brother, Argentine musician Ariel Rot, is a former member of the Spanish-Argentine supergroup Los Rodríguez and lives in Spain.

She began as an actress in Argentina, until 1976 when she fled the military dictatorship and moved to Spain. Roth has had great success in Spanish film since her first appearances in Las verdes praderas (The Green Meadows), by José Luis Garci; Arrebato (Rapture), by Iván Zulueta; and Laberinto de pasiones (Labyrinth of Passion) by Pedro Almodóvar. Her most prominent movies include Un lugar en el mundo (A place in the world) and Martín (hache), both by Adolfo Aristarain. In 1980 she worked with Almodovar on "Pepi, Luci, Bom" and, later, in "All About My Mother", which earned Almodóvar his first Academy Award for Best Foreign Language Film and “Pain and Glory”.

She is also known for her leading role in Todo sobre mi madre (All about my mother), by Almodóvar. Roth won Goya Awards for Best Actress with both directors. Roth has also made noteworthy appearances in numerous television series, including the soap operas Por amor (For love), together with Arnaldo André and Marita Ballesteros, and Nueve lunas (Nine moons). She appeared in the mini-series Laura y Zoe together with Susú Pecoraro, Epitafios (Epitaphs) with Julio Chávez and Leonardo Sbaraglia, and Tratame bien (Treat me nice) again with Chávez.

Roth was first married to Gonzalo Gil, then later married to Argentine singer-songwriter Fito Páez for some years, with whom she adopted a child, Martín. Joaquin Sabina composed the song "Cecilia" for Roth and Páez. In addition to her career in film and television, Roth has also worked in theater in Argentina, as well as in Spain. She is currently working, together with Darío Grandinetti, on the Philippe Blasband play, Una relación pornográfica.

In 2020, Roth played the main role in the film Alice, where she portrays Alicia Caloso, a dermatologist who commits suicide after developing an addiction to cosmetic procedures. The film, written by actor Guillermo Pfening, is based on Pfening's own mother and her mental health struggles with that problem.

== Filmography ==
=== Film ===
Year	Title	Role	Notes	Ref.
1976	No toquen a la nena		Feature film debut	
1977	Crecer de golpe			
1978	De fresa, limón y menta	Mariví		
1979	El curso en que amamos a Kim Novak	Cristina		
1979	Las verdes praderas	Matilde		
1979	La familia bien, gracias	Mónica		
1979	Cuentos eróticos			
1980	Arrebato	Ana Turner		
1980	Pepi, Luci, Bom y otras chicas del montón (Pepi, Luci, Bom and Other Girls on the Heap)			
1981	Pepe, no me des tormento	Bárbara		
1981	Best Seller	Claudia Mariscal / Diana Palmer		
1981	Trágala, perro			
1982	Laberinto de pasiones (Labyrinth of Passion)	Sexilia		
1983	Una pequeña movida			
1983	Entre tinieblas (Dark Habits)	Merche		
1984	El señor Galíndez			
1984	El jardín secreto			
1984	¿Qué he hecho yo para merecer esto? (What Have I Done to Deserve This?)			
1987	The Stranger	Anita Wren		
1988	Los amores de Kafka (The Loves of Kafka)			
1991	Vivir mata			
1992	Un lugar en el mundo (A Place in the World)	Ana Dominici		
1992	Desencuentros			
1997	Martín (Hache)	Alicia		
1997	Cenizas del paraíso (Ashes of Paradise)	Beatriz Teller		
1999	Todo sobre mi madre (All About My Mother)	Manuela		
1999	Segunda piel (Second Skin)	Eva		
2000	Una noche con Sabrina Love	Sabrina Love		
2001	Antigua vida mía (Antigua, My Life)	Violeta Dasinski		
2001	Vidas privadas (Private Lives)	Carmen Uranga		
2002	Hable con ella (Talk to Her)		Cameo	
2002	Deseo (Desire)	Alina		
2002	Kamchatka	Madre		
2003	La hija del caníbal (Lucía, Lucía)	Lucía		
2005	Otros días vendrán (Other Days Will Come)	Alicia		
2005	Padre nuestro	Maite		
2006	Sofacama	Bernie		
2008	El nido vacío (Empty Nest)	Martha		
2013	Los amantes pasajeros (I'm So Excited)	Norma Boss		
2013	Matrimonio	Molly		
2016	Migas de pan (Breadcrumbs)	Liliana Pereira		
2018	El ángel (El Angel)	Aurora		
2019	Dolor y gloria (Pain and Glory)	Zulema		
2020	El prófugo (The Intruder)	Marta		
2020	Crímenes de familia (The Crimes That Bind)	Alicia		
2022	Conversaciones sobre el odio (Conversations on Hatred)	Débora		
2024	Culpa cero (No Guilt)	Carola		

=== Television ===
- Epitafios (2004)
- Luisa Sanfelice (2004, TV Movie)
- Amas de casa desesperadas (2006)
- Tratame bien (2009)
- La mesías (2023)
- Moria (2026)

=== Narration ===
Year	Program	Role	Notes
2015–present	Atlántico sur	Narrator	Narration debut

== Theater ==
Year	Production	Direction
2006	Disparatados en Varieté!	
2006–2007	Días contados	Oscar Martínez
2010	Amor, dolor y qué me pongo	Mercedes Moran
2013–2014	Una relación pornográfica	Javier Daulte

== Awards and nominations ==
=== Goya Awards ===
Year	Category	Movie	Result
1998	Best Actress	Martín (Hache)	Won
2000	Best Actress	All About My Mother	Won

=== European Film Awards ===
Year	Category	Movie	Result
1999	Best Actress	All About My Mother	Won

=== Cóndor de Plata Awards ===
Year	Category	Movie	Result
1993	Best Actress	Un lugar en el mundo	Won
1998	Best Actress	Martín (Hache)	Won
2001	Best Actress	Una noche con Sabrina Love	Nominated
2002	Best Actress	Antigua vida mía	Nominated
2007	Best Supporting Actress	Sofacama	Nominated

=== Fotograma de Plata Awards ===
Year	Category	Movie	Result
1999	Best Actress	Todo sobre mi madre	Won

=== Konex Awards ===
Year	Category	Result
2001	Platinum Konex Award: Best Film Actress of the decade 1991–2000	Won

=== Other awards ===
- Gold Medal of Merit in the Fine Arts (2009)
- Festival de Cine Iberoamericano de Huelva (2000) for Best Actress in Una noche con Sabrina Love.
- Sant Jordi Award (1999) for Todo sobre mi madre .
- Latin ACE Award (1997) for Martín (Hache).

== See also ==
- Epitafios

== Sources ==
- Benavent, Francisco María (2000). Cine español de los 90. Diccionario de películas, directores y temático. Bilbao: Ediciones Mensajero. ISBN 84-271-2326-4.
