= Historias breves =

- Release date: May 19, 1995
- Running time: 109 minutes
- Country: Argentina
- Language: Spanish

Historias breves (lit. 'Short stories') is an Argentine feature-length film made up of nine short films directed, respectively, by Daniel Burman, Adrián Caetano, Jorge Gaggero, Tristán Gicovate, Andrés Tambornino and Ulises Rosell, Sandra Gugliotta, Lucrecia Martel, Pablo Ramos, and Bruno Stagnaro. It debuted in theaters on May 19, 1995.

The film brings together the winners of the first edition of the Argentine National Film Board's (INCAA) annual public script competition, the grand prize of which is the budget to produce a short film. Eventually screened in national theaters, the omnibus film gave rise and recognition to a new generation of Argentine filmmakers known collectively as the New Argentine Cinema—a wave of contemporary filmmaking that began in the mid-1990s in reaction to decades of political and economic crises in the country.

== Background ==
Filmmaker Lucrecia Martel explained in a 2008 interview that the premiere of the compilation film was “unprecedented” in Argentina and came about after all the directors of the short films banded together and visited the Argentine National Film Board (INCAA) headquarters in Buenos Aires repeatedly to ask the script contest organizers to premiere all the short films as a string of films in a theater. The filmmakers waited for hours until the contest organizers would meet with them and argued that it was a waste of state funding if they didn't exhibit the finished films. As a result, the films were exhibited on the dedicated screens of the national public circuit run by INCAA.

== Short films included ==
Original title	English title	Director	Writer	Summary
La ausencia	"Absence"	Pablo Ramos		A young man who tries to replace a lonely old watchmaker after discovering that he controls the lives of the people who pass by his street corner.
Cuesta abajo	"Downhill"	Adrián Caetano		A truck driver transporting a cargo of chickens, who becomes lost on an endless journey.
Dónde y cómo Oliveira perdió a Achala	"Where and How Oliveira Lost Achala"	Andrés Tambornino; Ulises Rosell	Andrés Tambornino; Ulises Rosell; Rodrigo Moreno	Two men traveling in a car looking for a village, apparently on the wrong road.
Guarisove, los olvidados	"Guarisove, the Forgotten Ones"	Bruno Stagnaro		Two groups of soldiers in the Falkland Islands who are unaware of the coming war.
Niños envueltos	"Wrapped Children" or "Stuffed Grape Leaves"	Daniel Burman		A boy and girl who meet due to a confusion over home-delivery of meals
Noches áticas	"Attic Nights"	Sandra Gugliotta		A tarot card reader who works on a phone sex hotline and receives a briefcase full of money with instructions to take it out of the country for laundering.
Ojos de fuego	"Eyes of Fire"	Jorge Gaggero	Jorge Gaggero; Matías Oks	A 13-year-old boy living in a miserable environment rebels and expresses himself with fire.
Rey muerto	"Dead King"	Lucrecia Martel		Set in the fictional village of Rey Muerto in northeastern Argentina, is about a woman who tries to escape her abusive husband with their three children.
La simple razón	"The Simple Reason"	Tristán Gicovate		

== Critical reception ==
Film critic Claudio España of La Nación wrote:

The work of these young people does not seek visual artifice, and its filmic language is based on the immediate image, simple and far from excesses.

Clarín wrote:

Very good...rare quality in all aspects...creativity in a small format.

Film scholars Raúl Manrupe and María Alejandra Portela wrote:

...of surprising quality. One of the few innovative premieres (aesthetically and conceptually). Some (Ojos de fuego; Dónde y cómo..., Rey muerto) stand out, but the general level is excellent. Much more than formal exercises.

El Amante del Cine magazine wrote:

The technical aspects are, for the most part, impeccable and in service to the stories. Which is to say: they are not distracting excesses and do not undermine the structure. One might enjoy one [film] more than another...but you leave the theater...having seen a cinematic program composed of attractive short stories with diverse atmospheres and goals.

== Legacy ==
Filmmaker Lucrecia Martel says that the premiere of Historias breves was "very successful" and drew 10,000 viewers. "It also inspired people," she says, "to study filmmaking and to start making shorts. It was a really important phenomenon in spiritual terms. Curiously, many of the directors who began their careers at the time—’95 or ’96—are still making films today. That event inaugurated the activity of a lot of directors, and also a lot of young people’s interest in film." Film scholar Haden Guest says it helped inaugurate the New Argentine Cinema and “is really where the [movement] began.”
