= List of Argentine films of 1995 =

A list of films produced in Argentina in 1995:

Argentine films of 1995
Title	Director	Release	Genre
A - C
1000 boomerangs	Mariano Galperín	17 August	
La ausencia	Pablo Ramos Grad	19 May	
La bailanta	Luis Rodrigo	17 August	
Caballos salvajes	Marcelo Piñeyro	10 August	drama
Casas de fuego	Juan Bautista Stagnaro	31 August	semiDocumentary
El censor	Eduardo Calcagno	12 October	
Comix, cuentos de amor, de video y de muerte	Jorge Coscia	22 June	
Con el alma	Gerardo Vallejo	27 April	
Las cosas del querer, 2da parte	Jaime Chávarri	25 May	
Cuesta abajo	Israel Adrián Caetano	19 May	
D - M
De amor y de sombra	Betty Kaplan	2 February	drama
Dónde y cómo Oliveira perdió a Achala	Andrés Tambornino and Ulises Rosell	19 May	
Facundo, la sombra del tigre	Nicolás Sarquís	31 March	
Fotos del alma	Diego Musiak	20 April	
Guarisove, los olvidados	Bruno Stagnaro	19 May	
Hasta donde llegan tus ojos	Silvio Fischbein	23 February	
Hijo del río	Ciro Cappellari	30 March	
Jaime de Nevares, último viaje	Marcelo Céspedes and Carmen Guarini	28 September	
Jimidin	Raúl Perrone	29 September	
El Largo viaje de Nahuel Pan	Jorge Zuhair Jury	26 June	
La ley de la frontera	Adolfo Aristarain	24 August	drama
Más allá del límite	Ezio Massa	5 October	
N - Z
La nave de los locos	Ricardo Wullicher	6 April	
Niños envueltos	Daniel Burman	19 May	
Noches áticas	Sandra Gugliotta		
No te mueras sin decirme adónde vas	Eliseo Subiela	15 June	
Ojos de fuego	Jorge Gaggero	19 May	
Patrón	Jorge Rocca	6 July	
Peperina	Raúl de la Torre	5 October	semiDocumentary
¡Que vivan los crotos!	Ana Poliak	23 March	
Rey muerto	Lucrecia Martel	19 May	
La simple razón	Tristán Gicovate	19 May	
Sin opción	Néstor Lescovich	9 February	

== External links and references ==
- Argentine films of 1995 at the Internet Movie Database
