= Verónica Cura =

Verónica Cura is a film producer, production manager, and production designer. She works in the cinema of Argentina.

Cura has worked at Aqua Films with Enrique Piñeyro, a film production company in Argentina. Cura owns since 2008 her own Production Company Utopica Cine partnering with Alex Zito. She teaches Production 101 at the ENERC (Escuela Nacional de Realización y Experimentación Cinematográfica).

== Producer filmography ==
- La Quimera de los héroes (2003) a.k.a. The Chimera of Heroes
- Whisky Romeo Zulu (2004)
- Cama adentro (2004) a.k.a. Live-In Maid
- Las Mantenidas Sin Sueños (2005)
- Vida en Falcon (2005)
- Fuerza aérea sociedad anónima (2006)
- El Otro (2007) a.k.a. The Other
- The Headless Woman (2009)
- Clipeado (2011) a.k.a. Clipped (in preproduction)
