= Alejandra Darín =

Argentine actress

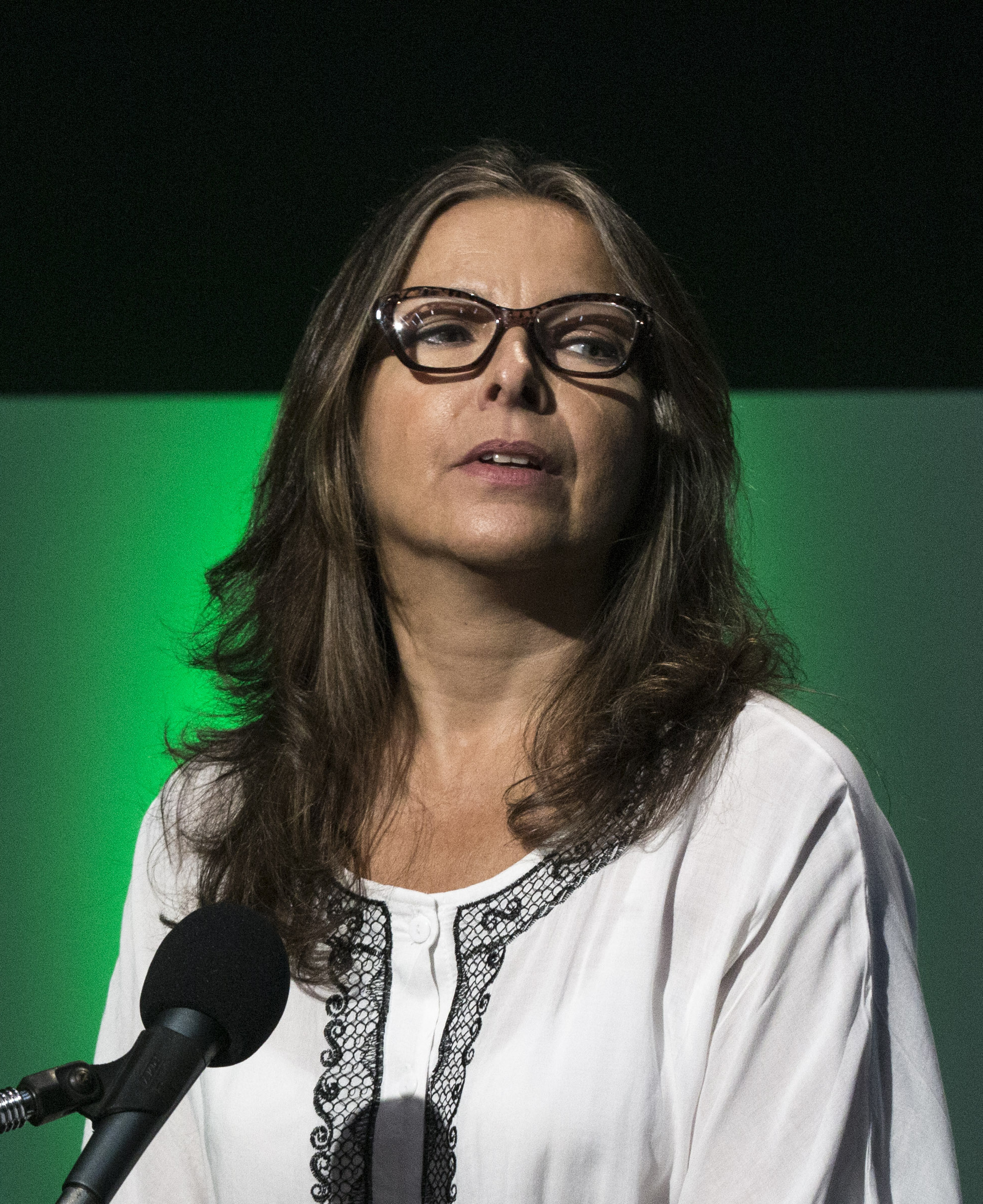
- Darín in 2015
- Born: June 19, 1962; Buenos Aires, Argentina
- Died: January 15, 2025 (aged 62); Buenos Aires, Argentina

Alejandra Gabriela Ángeles Darín (June 18, 1962 – January 15, 2025) was an Argentine actress and labor leader. From 2011 to 2025, she served as president of the Argentine Actors' Association.

== Biography ==
Alejandra Darín was born in Buenos Aires, Argentina, in 1962. She was of Lebanese and Italian ancestry (specifically from the Vigo di Cadore area), and her family was well connected in the world of theater. Her grandfather, the son of an Italian immigrant, was the owner of the Marconi theater. Both of her parents, Ricardo Darín Sr. and Roxana Darín, were actors, and her older brother is the well-known actor Ricardo Darín. Their parents separated when Alejandra was 3 years old, and they have another sibling from their father's subsequent relationship.

Fausto and Antonia Bengoechea, her two children with her partner, Álex Benn, also became actors.

Darín began acting professionally at age 9, appearing on the Canal 13 show La selva es mujer. Over an over 50-year career, she appeared in dozens of film, television, and stage productions, including the shows Poliladrón, 099 Central, Rincón de Luz, and Son amores.

She was also a labor leader, serving from 2011 until her death as president of the Argentine Actors' Association. She had first joined the union in 1973, and she led the organization during the passage of the Actor's Law, which gave actors access to Social Security retirement benefits. She was also active in the Latin American division of the International Federation of Actors.

Darín died in January 2025 at age 62, after a long illness.

== Filmography ==
=== Film ===
Year	Title	Role	Notes
2002	Samy y yo	Debora	
2005	Un minuto de silencio	Amanda	
2006	Oblivion	Viviana	
2009	Ni dios, ni patrón, ni marido	Irene	
2010	Cinco velitas	Silvia	Short films
2017	Libro de la memoria: homenaje a las víctimas del atentado	Nurse	Short films

=== Television ===
Year	Title	Role
1972	La selva es mujer	Lizzie
1973	El hogar que yo robe	Emilia Aguilar Velarde
1975	Dos hermanas	Alina
1977	Flor de barro	Florencia Pérez Miguez (Niña)
1982	El mundo del espectáculo	Karen
1982	Angelina	María Fernanda Piñeyro / Sara Ocampo
1982	Un hombre como vos	Bárbara
1982	Cenizas y Diamantes	Celeste Flores Caligaris
1982	Las 24 Horas	Various
1983	Los días contados	Carolina Amaya
1983	Vivan los novios	Lucía
1984	Dos vidas y un destino	Sofía
1984	Amo y señor	María Jose
1984	Nazarena	Nazarena Morales
1985	Por siempre tuyo	Graciela Elguero
1985	Aquí la jungla	Virginia
1987	Apuestas por amor	Julieta Montaño "La potra"
1988	De carne somos	Victoria "Vicky" Ripoli
1989	La extraña dama	Susana Nicoli
1989	Las comedias de Darío Vittori	Blanca / Popis
1989	Así son los mios	Julia
1990	Una voz en el teléfono	María Ines "Nene" Aguilar
1991	Amor de pura sangre	Marina Farias de Díaz
1992	Alta comedia	Teresa
1992	Teatro como en el teatro	Various
1992	Primer amor	Isabel
1992	Zona de riesgo	Gabriela
1993	María Sol	Marta Osorio
1993	De carencia y decencia	Esperanza Medina
1994	Sin condena	Laura / Mecha
1995	Dulce Ana	Melisa / Olga
1996	Amor sagrado	Marita Savedra
1997	Poliladrón	Marta
2000	Por ese palpitar	Laura Souto
2001	Un mundo de sensaciones	Olga
2002	099 Central	Lucrecia
2002	Son amores	Helena
2003	Rincón de luz	María Julia "Majula" Del Solar Seoane
2005	1/2 Falta	Laura Sobrado
2006	Juanita la soltera	Martina Ivanoff
2007	El hombre que volvió de la muerte	Helena
2010	Alguien que me quiera	Clara Moreno
2011	Tiempo de pensar	Antonia "Ep: La casa vacía"
2016	La Leona	Esther Liberman

=== Theater ===
- Scalabrini Ortiz
- Teresa Batista, cansada de guerra
- Las de Barranco
- Preludio de un beso
- Maradooo
- De carne somos
- Crimen y castigo
- Esquirlas
- El libro de Ruth
- Pirandello, dos miradas
- El evangelio de Evita
- Un informe sobre la banalidad del amor
- Código de familia
- Papá querido
- Tierra del Fuego
- Queda lejos aún
- El hombre equivocado
