= LAPA Flight 3142 =

1999 aviation accident in Argentina

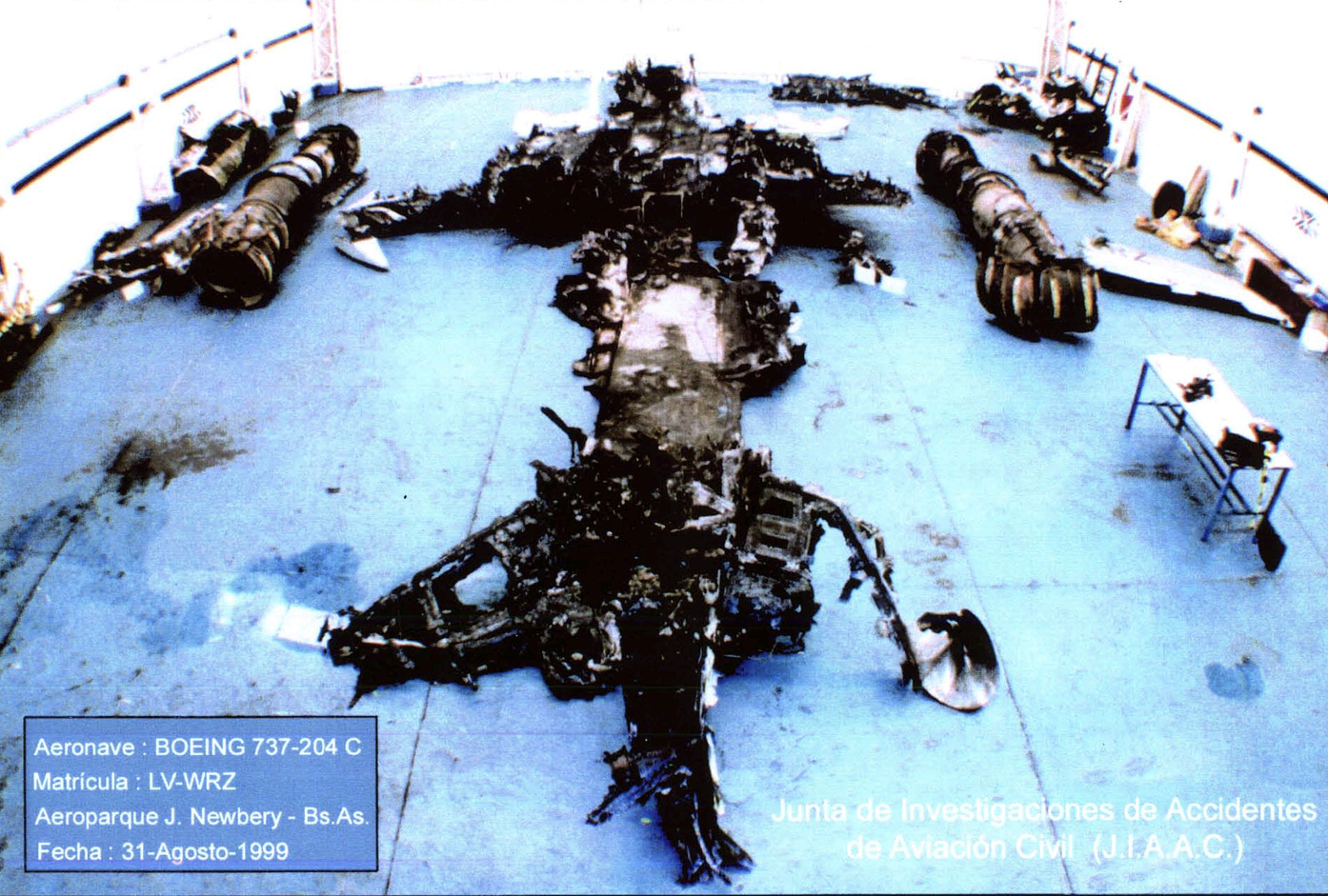
- Wreckage of the aircraft

Accident
- Date: 31 August 1999
- Summary: Runway overrun due to incorrect flap configuration
- Site: Aeroparque Jorge Newbery, Buenos Aires, Argentina; 34°34′1″S 58°24′7″W
- Total fatalities: 65
- Total injuries: 34

Aircraft
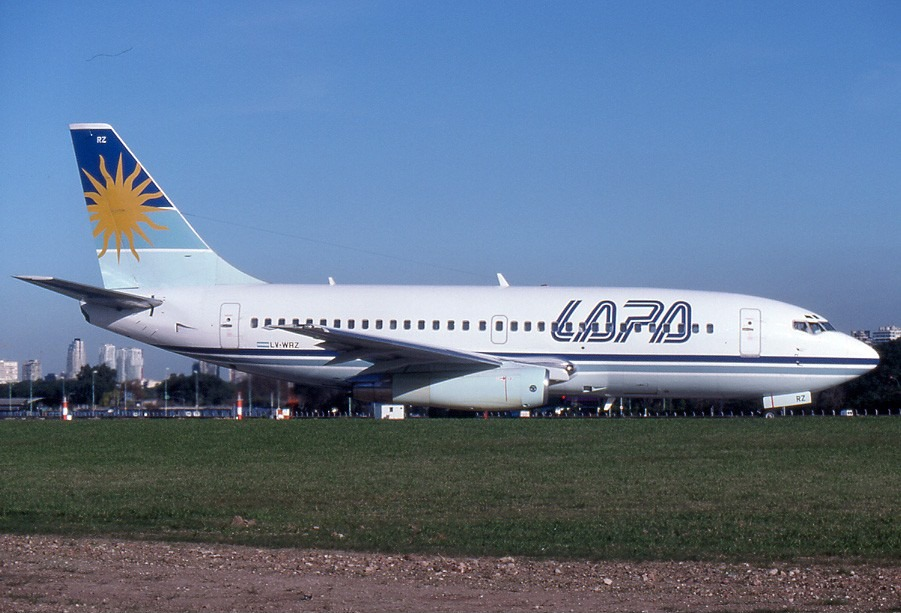
- LV-WRZ, the aircraft involved in the accident, pictured in 1998
- Aircraft type: Boeing 737-204C
- Operator: Líneas Aéreas Privadas Argentinas (LAPA)
- IATA flight No.: MJ3142
- ICAO flight No.: LPA3142
- Call sign: LAPA 3142
- Registration: LV-WRZ
- Flight origin: Aeroparque Jorge Newbery, Buenos Aires, Argentina
- Destination: Ingeniero Ambrosio L.V. Taravella International Airport, Córdoba, Argentina
- Occupants: 100
- Passengers: 95
- Crew: 5
- Fatalities: 63
- Injuries: 31
- Survivors: 37

Ground casualties
- Ground fatalities: 2
- Ground injuries: 3

LAPA Flight 3142 was a scheduled Buenos Aires–Córdoba flight operated by the Argentine airline Líneas Aéreas Privadas Argentinas. On 31 August 1999, the Boeing 737-200 operating the flight crashed while attempting to take off from Aeroparque Jorge Newbery International Airport in Buenos Aires.

The crash resulted in 65 fatalities – 63 occupants of the aircraft (3 crew members and 60 passengers) and 2 people on the ground – as well as injuries, some serious, to at least 34 people. As of 2026, it remains the second deadliest aviation accident to occur in Argentina, behind Aerolíneas Argentinas Flight 644, 38 years prior.

== Background ==
=== Aircraft ===
The aircraft was Boeing 737-204C, registered as LV-WRZ with serial number 20389 and line number 251. It was also powered by two JT8D-9A engines. It first flew on 14 April 1970, and was delivered to Britannia Airways on 17 April of that year as G-AXNB.

Almost 20 years later, on 1 February 1990, the aircraft was sold to the French airline TAT European Airlines, and registered as F-GGPB.

Finally, the aircraft was delivered to LAPA on 21 December 1996. At the time it crashed, it had accumulated 64,564 hours of flight time and 38,680 take-off/landing cycles. The aircraft was 29 years and 139 days old.

=== Crew ===
In command was Captain Gustavo Weigel, aged 45, who had logged 6,500 hours of flying experience, 1700 of which were logged on the Boeing 737. His co-pilot was Luis Etcheverry, aged 31, who had logged about 4,000 hours of flying experience, including 600 on the Boeing 737. Both pilots died in the accident.

With regard to the two pilots, the JIAAC report said that "the records of their flight and simulator training showed repeated negative flying characteristics, and if they had been able to move away from these characteristics in the face of difficulties, their poor attitude manifested itself once again in relaxed attitudes such as that seen in the cockpit of flight 3142".

Even though the report stated that "the pilots had fulfilled technical and psychological requirements", and that "their experience, both in general flight, and with this kind of aircraft was suitable for the job they were performing", a lawsuit later determined that Weigel was not fit to fly, since his license had expired.

Even though these personal issues surrounding the pilots had a very significant influence on the accident, the legal investigation performed in the following years centered on proving that the pilots were not entirely to blame, but that the lack of controls by the Air Force and LAPA's organizational culture also played a role in the events leading to the crash.

== Accident ==
As the aircraft started its takeoff run, the take-off warning system (TOWS) sounded an alarm indicating that the aircraft was not correctly configured for takeoff. The crew ignored the warning and continued, not realising that the flaps were not at the required takeoff position and were instead fully retracted. The jet overshot the runway, breaking through the airport's perimeter fence, crossed a road, hitting an automobile in the process, and finally collided with road construction machinery and a highway median. Fuel spilling over the hot engines and gas leaking from a damaged gas regulation station resulted in a fire that destroyed the aircraft.

The Junta de Investigaciones de Accidentes de Aviación Civil (JIAAC) determined that the pilots failed to configure the aircraft correctly for takeoff. The penal prosecution focused on proving that the company's policies and organization, under negligent supervision of the Argentine Air Force, were the main factors that led to the accident. For instance, it was mentioned that a pilot was allowed to fly without a license by the company. Because of these perceived flaws, some of LAPA's directors and the Air Force staff responsible for monitoring the airline were taken to jury trial.

=== Analysis ===
The JIAAC review of the flight reads:

The evening of the accident, the captain arrived at the Aeroparque Jorge Newbery one hour before take-off, as usual, in order to perform a regular commercial flight (LAPA 3142), on which 95 passengers and five crew members were to be transported to the destination airport Ingeniero Ambrosio Taravella in the city of Córdoba.

He arrived before the first officer and had an informal conversation with the flight dispatcher on duty. The aforementioned briefing started with the rest of the flight's crew, and when the first officer arrived, they went back over the weather conditions –which were good– and the NOTAMs for the destination airport as well as for alternative ones. Both pilots controlled the flight plan. Having seen the good weather conditions, the captain selected Aeroparque Jorge Newbery as the alternative airport and decided on the fuel requirements for the flight. The first officer went to the aircraft and the captain followed him shortly after.

The whole briefing lasted approximately ten minutes.

There were no unusual incidents during the briefing. There were no comments or attitudes outside the norm from either of the two pilots during the briefing.

According to the dispatcher, the captain looked very well and as energetic as usual and the first officer looked well. The first officer, the flight commissioner and cabin crew arrived at the aircraft first.

The first officer notified one of the mechanics assisting the aircraft that the total fuel requirement was 8,500 kilograms (18,700 lb), all to be stored in tanks on the wings. The mechanic corroborated loading fuel into the main tank. In this case, as required by the technical documentation of the time, the fuel was to be moved to the wing tanks. The mechanic started that job when the captain arrived at the aircraft.

Before entering the cockpit, he threw the flight technical record to the floor, showing annoyance, confirming that attitude by later shutting off the fuel transfer faucet between the main tank and the wing tanks, a job that was being performed at that precise moment by the assistant flight mechanic.

During their first four minutes on board, the captain, the co-pilot and the commissioner talked about trivial matters in good spirits, focusing on the commissioner's personal issues. When the commissioner left the cockpit, the conversation changed tone and matter as they discussed a controversial situation about their relationship. The captain said, after a reproach from the co-pilot, that he was "going through bad times," to which the copilot replied that he was also having a bad day.

Without interrupting the conversation and as part of it, the reading of the Procedures Control List (PCL) for the aircraft started, mixed with the personal issues that worried them and that led them to misread the procedure checklist.

This confusing situation, in which the PCL was interspersed with conversation irrelevant to the crew's task, persisted during "push back," engine start and taxiing, up to the moment of take-off, which was delayed by other aircraft waiting ahead of the LAPA flight and heavy arriving traffic.

During this final wait, the three men were smoking in the cockpit and their conversation could be of dubious interpretation.

Take-off started on Runway 13 of the Aeroparque at 20:53 hours, and in spite of overpassing rotation (Vr) and take-off security (V2) speeds, the aircraft did not succeed in taking off, continuing straight along its path uncontrollably, hitting several obstacles and finally impacting an embankment.

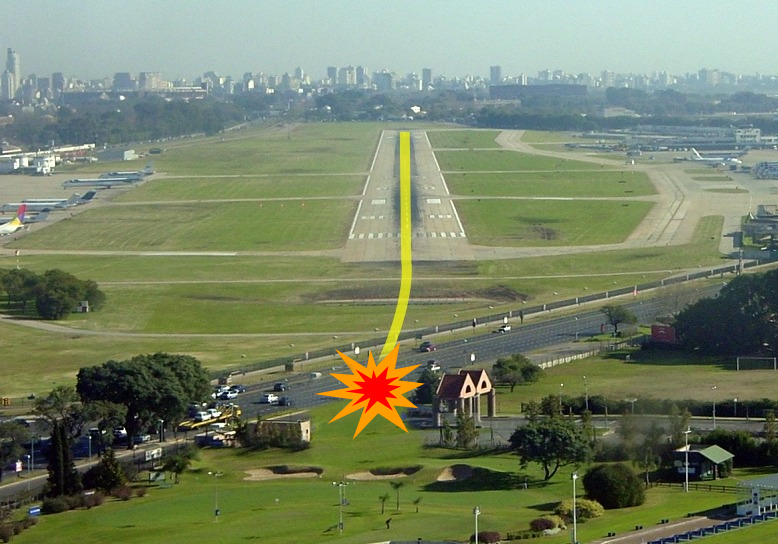
Approximate path of the aircraft. The path crosses the road, ending on the golf course.

The report details:

In its final run after failing to take off, the aircraft hit a Chrysler Neon car that was travelling on the Rafael Obligado road that crosses the projection of Runway 13. The car's fuel in contact with sparks from the sliding fuselage against the tarmac and the dragged automobile possibly ignited a fire on the left front side of the aircraft, which grew from rupture of the wings which spilled jet fuel of type JP-1. Also, as a result of a gas regulator plant being hit, a gas leak developed. The fire moved to the back of the aircraft, covering it entirely.

After impact against the embankment, but before catching fire, a flight attendant attempted to operate a fire extinguisher, but did not succeed because the cabin had already reached high temperatures. She also unsuccessfully tried to open the rear right door that was jammed – probably due to deformation. Finally, another flight attendant succeeded in opening the rear left door allowing several passengers to be evacuated before the fire spread. The right side of the fuselage showed an opening, through which a few passengers escaped.

Regarding the doors, preliminary versions of the report added that "the front left slide L1, of grey colour, was found deployed but unpressurised", which means a much greater than normal effort was needed to open the door. The early reports also considered that the absence of a food or drinks trolley in the rear galley of the aircraft helped, since walking distance to the exit was notably reduced.

Fire units from the airport, as well as the Federal Police, and the Naval Prefecture fought the fire. The evacuation operation was directed by the city's Medical Emergency Attention Service (SAME), which used 15 ambulances of their own as well as some from private hospitals. Based on the severity of their injuries, the casualties were taken to different treatment centres.

== JIAAC investigation ==
The Junta de Investigaciones de Accidentes de Aviación Civil investigation report was only one of the documents taken into account in the judicial investigation, though it was criticized for focusing solely on blaming the pilots directly.

During the three days after the accident, the United States National Transportation Safety Board (NTSB) sent a team to assist the JIAAC in their investigation. This team consisted of an NTSB representative and technicians from Boeing, Pratt & Whitney, and the US Federal Aviation Administration (FAA). While in Argentina, these investigators worked with JIAAC personnel, forming teams according to their areas of expertise.

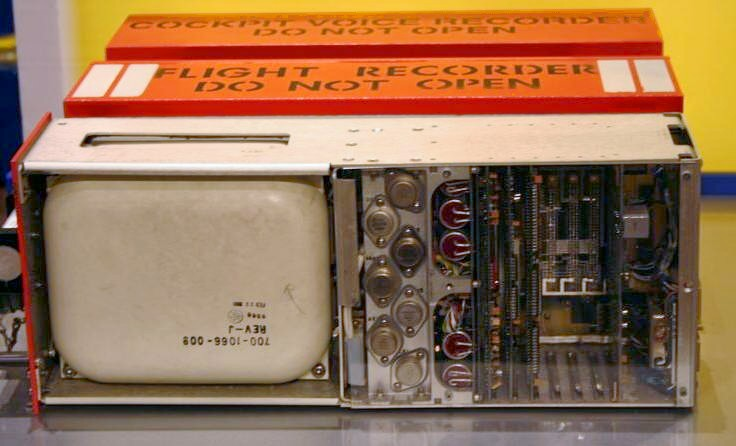
The CVR and the FDR, often called the "black boxes", which record the conversations of the cockpit and the navigational information of the plane.

The data from the flight data recorder (FDR) and the cockpit voice recorder (CVR) was read at the NTSB headquarters in Washington. With this information, a computerized animation of the failed take-off attempt was constructed.

Another aspect that was studied and analyzed was the adherence to the maintenance plan in the available technical documentation. The analysis led investigators to believe that the aircraft, its components and its engines complied with the requirements set out in the maintenance plan and the approved operational specifications of the Dirección Nacional de Aeronavegabilidad (National Board of Airworthiness).

To complete the detailed investigation, the JIAAC technicians reassembled the main components of the aircraft in a hangar in the Aeroparque. They also cleaned, identified and analyzed the boards, actuators, electronic equipment, the cockpit pedestal, and other flight controls that were recovered from the accident site, and dismantled the engines of the plane as much as possible given the state of destruction they faced. The technicians inspected the hydraulic system on the thrust reversers of both engines and the braking system of the landing gear, all of which were found to be in sufficient working order.

=== Engines & thrust reversers ===
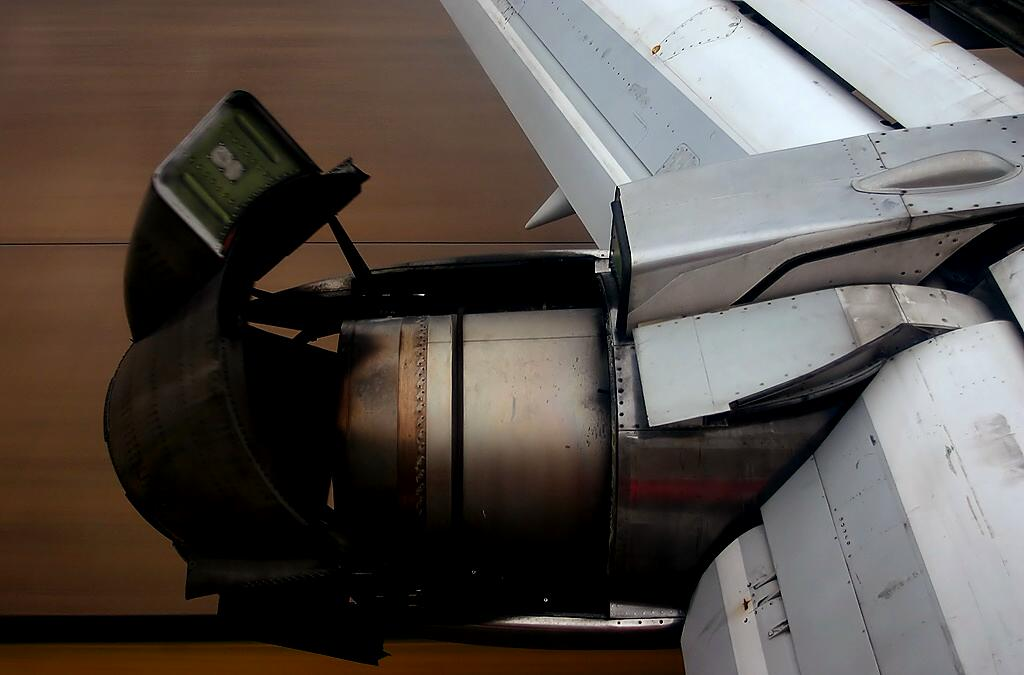
A Boeing 737-200 during landing with its thrust reversers deployed and the flaps extended

The investigation concluded that the engines almost certainly functioned until the final impact, though their behaviour at that particular moment could not be precisely determined. Nevertheless, from the reading of the FDR it was observed that both engines had equal thrust and were set to provide thrust for take-off before power was reduced and the thrust reversers were applied. In order to determine if there was a bird strike, the National Institute for the Investigation of Natural Sciences (Instituto Nacional de Investigaciones de las Ciencias Naturales) performed a study with negative results.

The thrust reversers – which are located behind the engine and direct the exhaust forward to slow the aircraft down quickly after landing (see image) – were found seriously damaged, but the hydraulic mechanism of the left engine was set for reverse thrust while the right one was set for forward thrust. The investigation was unable to determine if the thrust reversers were intentionally activated and later deactivated.

=== Control surfaces ===
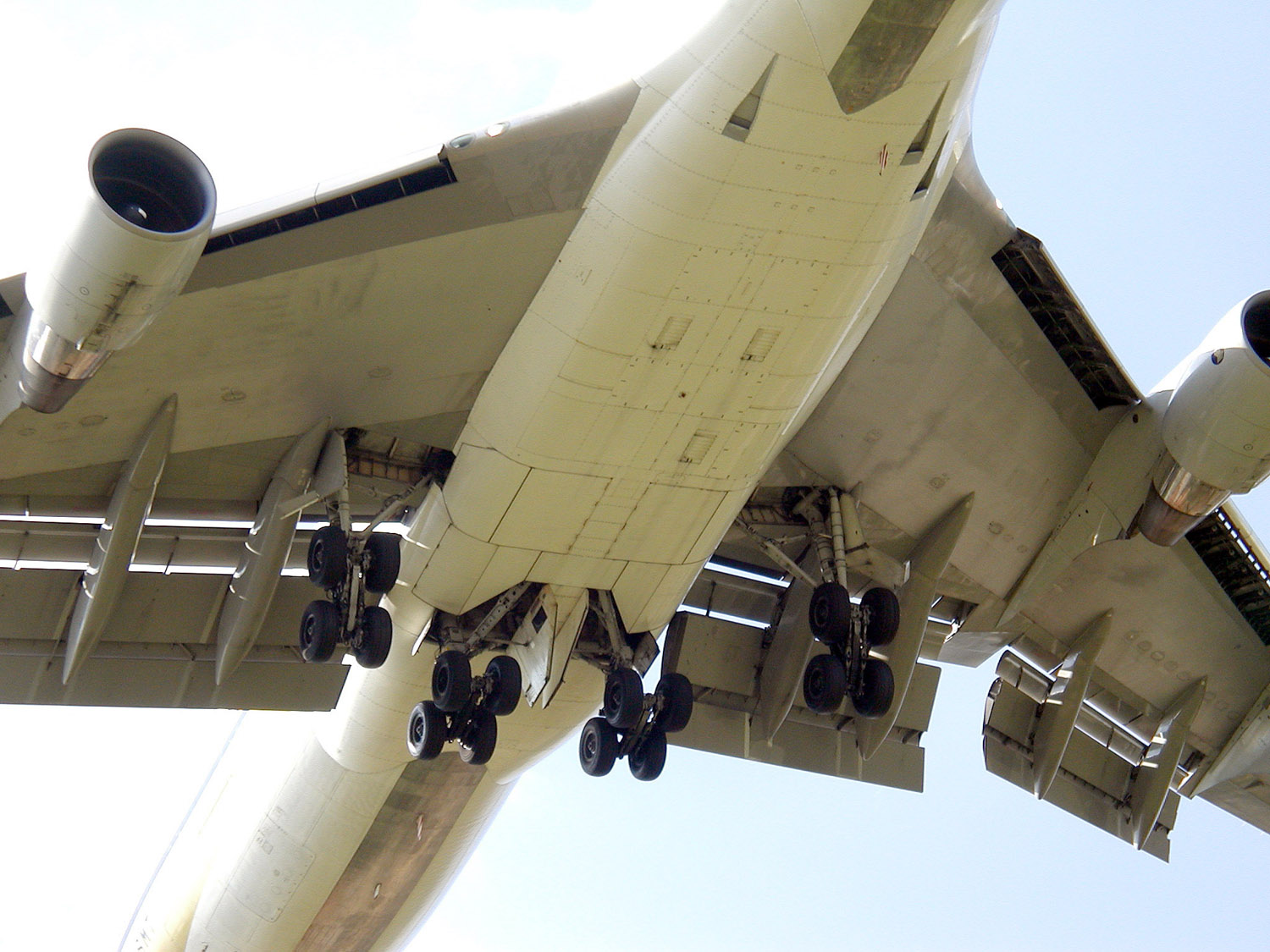
The flaps on this Boeing 747 are the surfaces that extend behind the wings, thus permitting the airplane to maintain sufficient lift to fly at lower speeds, during takeoff, initial ascent, approach, and landing.

It was important for the investigation to establish the position of the mechanical activators on the flaps, since their lack of deployment was a fundamental cause of the accident. A special investigation was carried out to establish what had happened with the flaps. The extended flaps alter the aerodynamic characteristics of the aircraft, giving the aircraft lift to get off the ground at a lower speed over a shorter distance than would be possible without flaps. This is why in practice there are no runways that allow the take-off of medium- to large- size aircraft without flaps.

The main finding within the remains of the plane was that all of the examined flaps' worm gear operators were in the unwound position, indicating that the flaps were not deployed. This finding was supported by the flap command in the cockpit that was also in the no-flaps position, the readings at the FDR indicating the flaps were retracted, and the extinguished flap lights indicating that they were not activated.

=== Other analyses ===
The alarm sound recorded by the CVR indicated that there was a problem with the departure configurations. The recording showed that at the time of departure the flaps were not in the correct position for lift-off.

A study was performed on the electrical circuitry to determine the position of the electrical breakers on the take-off warning system. Also, a study was performed on the slat indicator lights' filaments.

The indicator lights were found to be off, the only fire alarm was off, and the main warning indicators (Master Caution) were found on. The latter could be activated by any one of a long list of possible faults resulting in the destruction of the aircraft.

=== Conclusion ===
According to the investigative commission, the immediate cause of the accident was "that the flight crew of LAPA flight 3142 forgot to extend the wing flaps to initiate take-off, and ignored the alarm that advised them of the error in configuration for take-off."

=== Contributing factors ===
The report of the JIAAC cites the following factors as contributing to the accident:

- Lack of crew discipline, who did not make the logical reaction of aborting take-off and checking for errors when the alarm sounded as the engines started and as it continued to sound until the take-off attempt.
- Excess conversations irrelevant to the flight and moments of significant emotional intensity between the pilots that were mixed with the reading of the flight checklist resulting in the omission of the part of the procedures where flaps for take-off are to be extended.
- Personal, family, or economic problems or other issues of both pilots that interfered with their operational manner.
- Insufficient psychological screening, resulting in the inability to detect when the pilots were suffering from personal problems that influenced their ability as pilots.
- Knowledge and discussion of very personal and non-work-related affairs among the pilots and with the flight crew that fostered an atmosphere lacking in the necessary focus and concentration for operational tasks.
- Aggravation of the captain's previous negative in-flight behaviour by his personal situation and interactions within the cockpit before and during the emergency.
- Previous negative flight characteristics of the first officer that manifested themselves during the reading of the list of control procedures, all occurring in a cockpit whose occupants had their attention on personal issues unrelated to the flight.
- Lack of immediate recognition or corroboration by the pilots of the relationship between the type of audible alarm and the improper take-off configuration, and the failure to employ the flaps correctly for take-off.
- Design of the alarm system in the Boeing 737 that did not ensure that the crew respond to the information it was feeding them and allowing them to continue with take-off regardless.

=== Casualties ===
The following table shows the casualties incurred by the accident as reported by JIAAC:

Injuries	Fatal	Major	Minor	None
Crew	3	–	–	2
Passengers	60	15	16	4
Ground	2	2	1	–
Total	65	17	17	6

== Criminal proceedings ==
After the accident, the criminal case remained in the hands of Federal Judge Gustavo Literas, who, during the first months, received the preliminary report of the JIAAC and took testimony from dozens of LAPA mechanics.

At the beginning of March 2000, the judge called 540 people to testify, most of them LAPA pilots, copilots, and flight attendants. From this point the investigation centered on the theory that, in addition to pilot error, the ultimate cause of the accident was systemic problems in the management of flight operations. During the first two weeks of March, testimony was taken from some 140 people and by this time almost all the survivors had also given testimony.

On 14 May 2000, Judge Carlos Liporaci, who replaced Judge Literas (who was on leave) ordered a search of LAPA headquarters and their operations room at Aeroparque, seizing the files of the company's pilots. The court secretary, Pablo Bertussi, said, "When the accident happened, we took only the files of the pilots of that flight. Now we want to review those of the other pilots of this company."

On 18 May 2000, the JIAAC delivered its final report on the accident to the judge. The report was questioned by judicial sources because it focused solely on laying blame on the pilots. Regarding this report, the newspaper La Nación said the next day:

Even so, according to judicial sources, the dossier is still one more expert's report, and Judge Gustavo Literas, who is investigating the case, asked the Air Force to send him the files that prompted the report's conclusions. The judge wants all of the allegations to be based upon and supported by documents, according to our sources.

=== Indictments ===
The following week, on 24 May 2000, the judge called for the indictment of 32 people including Gustavo Andrés Deutsch, President of LAPA; the former head of the Air Force, Brigadier General Rubén Montenegro (retired); the former head of the National Division of Aeronavigability, Brigadier Juan Baigorria (retired); the former head of the Division of Aeronautical Permits, Commodore Damián Peterson (retired); the former head of the National Institute of Aeronautical and Space Medicine, Commodore Diego Lentino (retired); and the former head of the Command of Aerial Regions, Brigadier Major Enrique Dutra. Literas also ordered the seizure of the assets of Deutsch and 11 other LAPA leaders in the amount of 60 million pesos.

Regarding the progress of the investigation, the morning paper Página/12 commented on the following day:

The investigation highlighted the lack of a human resources policy in LAPA. "There must have been more expertise and thoroughness in pilot's tests. We detected negligence and flexibility," a senior judicial source explained to Página/12. None of the Air Force inspections that Weigel underwent – who died in the accident – served to detect his proven abnormal performance. "It is unacceptable that they continue to do the same psychophysical tests that they did to me when I did my military service," said an outraged grey-haired official.

A little less than one month afterward, on 22 June 2000, Gustavo Deutsch – president of LAPA – appeared for his declaration and responded to over 100 questions from the judge and attorneys general. La Nación reported that according to a judicial source, Deutsch "did not reveal useful information to the investigation". Even so, Deutsch was the only LAPA official who responded to the questions, as the others elected not to respond.

By the end of August, near the one-year anniversary of the tragedy, the investigation had accumulated 1,600 pages of findings in 80 sections, it had heard 1,500 witnesses, and 34 indictments were carried through the judicial process. At this point, the various sources of information had rendered enough evidence to show that, although the direct cause of the accident was human error, the pilot was in no condition to command an airplane; thus, the responsibility also fell partly on company officials and various high-level heads of the Air Force.

In early November 2000, the second session of the Federal Court of Appeal annulled the confiscation of 60 million pesos that the judge had ordered against the LAPA officials.

=== Formal charges ===
On 22 December 2000, in a 1,200-page resolution, Judge Literas charged four LAPA officials and three members of the Air Force. The LAPA officials were charged with estrago culposo seguido de muerte (similar to 'catastrophic criminal negligence leading to death') and included:

- Gustavo Andrés Deutsch – president
- Ronaldo Patricio Boyd – director general
- Fabián Chionetti – operations manager
- Nora Arzeno – human resources manager

Likewise, several members of the Air Force were prosecuted for dereliction of duty in public office:

- Brigadier Major Enrique Dutra (retired) – head of the Command of Aerial Regions
- Commodore Carlos Petersen (retired) – director of empowerment and promotion
- Commodore Diego Lentino (retired) – director of the National Institute of Aeronautical and Space Medicine

When the resolution was released, it also called for seizing the assets of LAPA president Gustavo Deutsch in the amount of 40 million pesos, 500,000 for Director General Ronaldo Boyd, and 100,000 for each of the other managers. All of the accused escaped incarceration.

With respect to the motive behind accusing the LAPA officials, La Nación drew upon the judicial resolution:

There are by now enough prima facie elements to sustain that the accused negligently performed those duties and obligations that were assigned to them, consequently creating a dangerous situation that ultimately produced the disaster investigated, from the arrival of commander Gustavo Weigel to the company, allowing the development of his career within it, to the moment of the assembly of the crew that was in charge of flight 3142 on 31 August 1999.

The daily Clarín added that the resolution states that "a large fraction of the pilots were in violation of their annual vacation periods. As for the activities of the directors of the LAPA corporation, there is evidence of sloppy procedure in the areas of security and especially personnel selection."

With respect to the motive behind accusing the military personnel, the judge made the following comment about the Command of Aerial Regiones (CRA) of the Air Force:

The CRA has not yet established a clear policy for the selection of inspectors, nor plans for the initial and periodical instructions of its personnel that would contemplate the minimum requirements to perform their functions in the areas of license handling and operation supervision.

=== Changing judges ===
In March 2001, Judge Literas resigned from his post and the case passed into the hands of Judge Claudio Bonadio.

Two years after its inception, the case's file had 110 sections, over a thousand testimonies, and seven accused individuals who awaited the ruling of the Federal Court as to whether they would be brought to jury trial proceedings. The judge also accepted Nora Nouche, the copilot's partner, as a plaintiff and recognized her as another victim rather than one of the responsible persons.

On 8 November 2001, the case changed hands once again and fell to Judge Sergio Torres.

=== Continuation of the trial ===
Roughly eight months later, on 15 July 2002, the second session of the Federal Court of Appeals confirmed the accusations of Deutsch, Boyd, and Chionetti, as well as revoking the accusation against Nora Arzeno. It also revoked the dismissal of Alfredo De Víctor and Valerio Diehl, the predecessors of Chionetti in operations management at LAPA, as well as José María Borsani, head of the Boeing 737 division of LAPA. At the same time, it recognized the lack of merit of flight instructors Vicente Sánchez, Alberto Baigorria, José Héctor García, and Juan Carlos Ossa.

Among the military officials, the Federal Court decided to revoke the accusations levelled initially against Enrique Dutra, Damián Peterson, and Diego Lentino.

La Nación made the following comment about the Court's resolution:

The central point of the resolution of Congressmen Horacio Cattani, Martín Irurzun, and Eduardo Luraschi is the analysis of Weigel's professional background. Beginning with this evaluation, they sustained, "one can affirm the existence of negligent actions of those persons (the accused) who, in one way or another, allowed the pilot (Weigel) to be in command of an airliner."

The judges understood that, taking it as a given that one of the basic principles of aeronautical activity is safety, "one ought not pass over nor minimize the errors committed by the crew during initial exams or follow-ups (skill re-certification exams), whether in flight or in a simulator, which provide observations like those that appeared in the dossier of the deceased pilot (Weigel)."

Thus, they enumerated a long series of errors and lack of attentiveness committed by the pilot during his exams. According to the material contained in the file that was incorporated into the judicial review, it was noted as early as April 1994 that Weigel "appeared slow" and that "he should improve his command of lists and procedures ... He passed his pilot exam with the minimum score" and was subsequently certified by his instructors.

In that same year, his file claimed that Weigel needed to improve his in-cockpit coordination and his use of the checklists. "One evaluation shows that he was uninformed about his appropriate role; as a consequence of this, he does not lead well and there is a lack of security and coordination in the cockpit," according to his file.

On 17 October, federal officials requested a renewed accusation against Dutra, Petersen, Lentino, and Arzeno, whose charges the Federal Court had revoked.

The following day, Clarín revealed that federal officials "in a 40-page letter, presented to Federal Judge Sergio Torres, stated that at the time of the LAPA accident, they did not have a revised and approved Operations Manual provided by the Command of Aerial Regions" and that "this document was required and should have regulated the organizational and administrative structure of the airline, the minimum equipment that a plane should have, and even the procedures to be followed in the case of an accident."

At the same time, La Nación claimed that "Arzeno was responsible for a little-known fact: Weigel, while he should have not been permitted to fly after his previous actions, also should not have been in command of an airplane on the day of the tragedy because his license was expired."

A little over a year later, on 1 December 2003, the second session of the Federal Court confirmed the accusations against Dutra, Peterson, and Lentino, accusing them of the crimes of "abuse of authority and failure to fulfill the responsibilities of public office". Among the reasons cited by the judges were the lack of controls and that "the evaluations taken of the crew were totally insufficient to present a clear profile of the subjects".

Additionally, it revoked the dismissal of Arzeno and charged him with negligence. The judges, according to the information taken from La Nación, said that "human behavior does not occur in a vacuum, but is rather a reflection of the corporate and regulatory environment in which it takes place". For the congressmen, there was a "clear relationship" between the courses that Pilot Weigel had not completed and "the violations that occurred in the cockpit" on that fateful day, something that was not caught by the managers who controlled the process.

On 10 September 2004, the Federal official Carlos Rívolo required the accused to stand trial in public jury trial proceedings. The request, roughly 600 pages in length, called for a judgment on Gustavo Deutsch, Ronaldo Boyd, Fabián Chionetti, Nora Arzeno, Valerio Diehl, and Gabriel Borsani for estrago culposo (catastrophic criminal negligence). In a similar vein, it requested the judgement of Enrique Dutra, Damián Peterson, and Diego Lentino, asking that they be charged for "failure to fulfill the duties of public office".

Concerning this request, the daily Infobae said that "among other considerations, Rívolo emphasized that the pilot of the destroyed plane, Gustavo Weigel, killed in the accident, had a 'regulationally expired' pilot's license and acknowledged that the aviator, before take-off, 'had not checked that the doors were closed' and 'said that he always forgot to close the doors'."

On 9 June 2005, the Federal Court of Appeals rejected the nullification motions that several of the accused had proposed, and it ordered them to jury trial. Infobae commented:

The defense, led by Jorge Sandro, dismissed the fiscal accusation as "incongruent" and declared that the accused had not been given "a clear, precise, and detailed description" of the crimes of which they were accused and therefore were denied "the guarantees of due process and right to defense."

He added that Deutsch and Boyd "did not have the authority of selection, instruction, and control of the pilots and crew members" and Chionetti "adduced that he had gained the relevant authority mere months before the incident."

However, Judges Horacio Cattani and Eduardo Luraschi ratified the nullification of those appeals. "Such questions, in a way, pertain to the nullifying declaration and represent a mere complaint of the defense against the treatment given to the group," they said in a statement.

The Court maintained that from a "simple reading" of the fiscal accusation there emerged a clear description of how the events occurred and the accusations against the directors, in relation "to the errors committed by the pilot and copilot of the destroyed flight as a reflection of the 'recklessness' that incurred disregard of the principle of flight security."

"No doubt remains that, now that this phase of the investigation has come, it is an opportune moment to pose questions during the discussions of the jury trial phase," the statement underscored.

On 5 July 2005, Judge Torres ruled the process complete and elevated all of the accused to jury trial, consequently forming a tribunal to try them. Nine persons ended up being accused: six LAPA officials and three members of the Argentinian Air Force (FAA). Charged with estrago culposo were Gustavo Deutsch (former president of LAPA), Ronaldo Boyd (Director General of LAPA), Fabián Chionetti, and Valerio Diehl (Operations Managers of LAPA), Gabriel Borsani (head of the B-737 Line at LAPA) and Nora Arzeno (Human Resources Manager of LAPA). For dereliction of duty in public office, the charged were Enrique Dutra (former Commander of Aerial Regions of the FAA), Damián Peterson (former Director of Aeronautical Permits), and Diego Lentino (former Director of the national Institute of Aeronautical and Aerospace Medicine).

Infobae described the judicial resolution in the following terms:

In the resolution, the judge reiterated that the determining factors allowing the accident to occur were "the lack of effective control and subsequently taking measures by the responsible persons of the firm LAPA S.A. at the decision-making level, with respect to the aspects relevant to flight security."

In this way he placed responsibility on the airline directors for having completed "in a negligent manner" the responsibilities of their posts including contracting the pilot Gustavo Weigel, allowing the development of his career path at the business.

The judge highlighted "the constant and permanent contact and direct participation that Deutsch and Boyd had in the politics of advancement in the business" and he reproached them for "the lack of effective control that might have made it possible for the pilots to overcome the errors committed."

The accused face million-dollar asset seizures and charges that have accrued to them from the commercial court that conducted the public examination of the airline.

As for the members of the Air Force, they will be tried for neglecting to observe the law pertaining to content control of the Operations Manual of the airline industry and the norms for training airplane pilots.

Accordingly, the judge reiterated that Lentino was accused of not having completed his principal duty adequately, namely running control checks on the psychophysiological fitness of pilots.

The crime of which the former officials stand accused carries a penalty of up to two years of prison and special incarceration can double the time when the offense is committed while in public office.

The final judgement of the case was delayed by motions filed by the defense of several accused in order to slow the jury trial process, all of which were finally rejected weeks later by the Federal Court in Buenos Aires.

=== Verdict, initial conclusion, and overturn of convictions ===
At the investigation's conclusion, the blame fell upon the pilot Gustavo Weigel, who died in the accident, and upon those who were in charge of tracking his job performance.

On 23 July 2005, one of the accused, Enrique Dutra, was found dead in a car parked in his garage, in the Cordoban neighborhood of Villa Carlos Paz. It was widely believed to be a suicide.

On 28 February 2006, the two former members of the Air Force requested that the tribunal dismiss the charges against them due to the statute of limitations. According to their request, which was accepted, the case against them should have been shelved because more than four years passed between the first accusations and the sentencing, and the crime of which they were accused had a maximum sentence of two years. Nevertheless, the complaining part appealed the decision, and the case was taken to the high court, which would decide on the matter. As for the LAPA officials, they were charged with estrago culposo (negligence followed by death) instead, a crime with a maximum sentence of four years of prison, thus they could not yet appeal to the statute of limitation.

The trial at the high court took place at the Tribunal Oral Federal No. 4 starting on 28 March 2007. The court was designated to be composed by judges Leopoldo Bruglia, María Cristina Sanmartino and Horacio Vaccare, but the last one decided to recuse himself after relatives of the victims disputed his impartiality. His colleagues were to decide if they accepted his resignation.

On 2 February 2010, Fabián Chionetti (the operations manager) and Nora Arzeno (the human resources manager) were both found guilty of criminal negligence and were both sentenced to three years in prison, while the rest were acquitted of the charges. However, on 11 February 2014, the convictions of Chionetti and Arzeno were overturned by the IV Chamber of the Federal Chamber of Cassation, as the amount of time it took to bring all of the accused people to trial exceeded the legal deadlines. The entire case was considered a case of impunity.

== Dramatization ==
The film Whisky Romeo Zulu brought the story of the accident to the silver screen. It starred and was written and directed by Enrique Piñeyro, an actor, doctor, and former LAPA pilot.

The film is a fictional reproduction of the background of the accident as seen through the eyes of Piñeyro himself, who was actually a LAPA pilot from 1988 to 1999. Piñeyro resigned from his position in June 1999—just two months before the accident—after voicing his concerns about the airline's safety policy. Concerning his motivation for making the film, Piñeyro said:

I was personally interested in recounting how the accident came to occur, not the fact that the pilots forgot about the flaps and the plane blew up, but why they forgot the flaps. And what was the process, because forgetting the flaps was the straw that broke the camel's back in a series of tremendous violations of regulations. I was interested in portraying what isn't apparent about the accident, not just the final link (the pilot). Because all the links that came before were conveniently hidden because they compromised the establishment, the business.

The accident was covered in the 9th episode of the 17th season of Mayday (also known as Air Crash Investigation, Air Emergency, and Air Disasters). The episode is titled "Deadly Discussions".

== See also ==
- Austral Líneas Aéreas Flight 2553
- Cubana de Aviación Flight 389
- Delta Air Lines Flight 1141
- Mandala Airlines Flight 091
- Northwest Airlines Flight 255
- Spanair Flight 5022
