= Carla Calabrese =

Argentine theatre director and producer

Carla Calabrese is an Argentine theatre director, producer, actress, and educator. She is the founder and artistic director of The Stage Company, a theatre production company based in Buenos Aires. Calabrese has directed and produced several notable stage adaptations, including the Spanish-language productions of Come From Away, The Curious Incident of the Dog in the Night-Time, and Shrek the Musical.

== Career ==
Carla Calabrese started The Stage Company in 2005. The company began with plays for school audiences and developed into performance for adults, including Spanish versions of The Three Musketeers, Legend pirate and Marco Polo. In 2014, they performed A summer night’s Dream, the musical, and in 2015, Shrek, the musical.

In 2019, Calabrese premiered the Spanish-language production of Come From Away at the Teatro Maipo in Buenos Aires. The production was positively received and won multiple awards, including Best Musical and Best Direction at the 2021 Hugo Awards.

In 2022 Calabrese was associate producer for the TV Mini Series Canelones. She also acted in the series El encargado (The Boss -literally, 'The Caretaker').

Calabrese directed the Spanish-language adaptation of The Curious Incident of the Dog in the Night-Time in Buenos Aires, and later produced a revival of Shrek the Musical.

In 2023, she directed Consentimiento, the local version of Nina Raine's play Consent, produced at the Teatro Maipo.

In 2023, Calabrese and the cast of Come From Away traveled to Gander, Newfoundland, to meet the residents whose stories inspired the musical.

In 2024, Come From Away was staged in Madrid, Spain, under Calabrese's direction. The Madrid production was featured in several Spanish media outlets, including El País and La Razón.

== Humanitarian work ==
In addition to her theatre work, Calabrese co-founded the NGO Solidaire with her husband, Argentine filmmaker and philanthropist Enrique Piñeyro. In 2024, the organization launched a rescue ship, Solidaire, to assist migrants in danger on the Mediterranean Sea.

== Awards ==
- 2021 – Best Direction, Hugo Awards, for Come From Away.
- 2022 – Best Director, ACE Awards.
- 2025 – Best Musical and Best Direction, Musical Theatre Awards in Spain

== Personal life ==
Calabrese married Enrique Piñeyro in 1998; they have a son, Theo. Calabrese and Piñeyro own the Maipo theater in Buenos Aires.
