= Donde duermen dos... duermen tres =

- VHS cover
- Directed by: Enrique Cahen Salaberry
- Written by: Elena Cruz, Fernando Siro
- Edited by: Gerardo Rinaldi; Higinio Vecchione
- Release date: 12 August 1979
- Running time: 100 minutes
- Country: Argentina
- Language: Spanish

Donde duermen dos... duermen tres is a 1979 Argentine comedy film directed by Enrique Cahen Salaberry. This film was distributed by an Argentine distributor named "Paris Video Home", a company that distributes comedy films.

== Cast ==
- Juan Carlos Calabró
- Juan Buryúa Rey
- Alberto Busaid
- Berugo Carambula
- Elina Colomer
- Luis Corradi
- Juan Carlos Dual
- Cacho Espíndola
- Susana Gimenez
- Adela Gleijer
- Zulma Grey
- Norma López Monet
- Susana Monetti
- Tatave Moulin
- Edelma Rosso
- Renee Roxana
- Vicente Rubino
- Tristán
- Isidro Fernán Valdez
- Sergio Velazco Ferrero
