= Alejandro Brodersohn =

Argentine film editor

- Born: 1969
- Occupation: Film editor

Alejandro Brodersohn (born in Buenos Aires) is an Argentine film editor. Some of the films he has edited have been critically well received: Buenos Aires Vice Versa, (1996) Whisky Romeo Zulu (2004), 18-j (2004), and El Abrazo partido (2004).

== Filmography ==
- Buenos Aires Vice Versa (1996) a.k.a. Buenos Aires Vice Versa
- Moebius (1996)
- La Cruz (1997)
- Fantasmas en la Patagonia (1997)
- Evita, una tumba sin paz (1997) a.k.a. Evita: The Unquiet Grave
- Mala época (1998)
- El Viento se llevó lo qué (1998) a.k.a. Wind with the Gone
- Los Libros y la noche (1999) a.k.a. The Books and the Night
- Río escondido (1999) a.k.a. Hidden River
- El Nadador inmóvil (2000)
- Ciudad de María (2002) a.k.a. Mary's City
- El C.A.I.N.A.: Los chicos de la calle (2002)
- Valentín (2002) a.k.a. Valentin
- El Cielito (2004) a.k.a. Little Sky
- Whisky Romeo Zulu (2004)
- Un Mundo menos peor (2004) a.k.a. A Less Bad World
- 18-j (2004)
- El Abrazo partido (2004) a.k.a. Lost Embrace
- Iluminados por el fuego (2005) a.k.a. Blessed by Fire
- Mientras tanto (2006)
- Fuerza aérea sociedad anónima (2006)
- The Lake House (2006)

== Television ==
- Okupas (2000) TV Series
- Querida Mara (2001) (TV) a.k.a. Cartas de un viaje por la Patagonia
