= Solidaire (ship) =

European humanitarian ship

- As Ocean Spey in 2017

History
- Builder: Ulstein Verft, Norway
- Completed: 2000
- Identification: MMSI:211131900; IMO:9224817

General characteristics
- Tonnage: 1,864 GRT
- Length: 66 metres (217 ft)
- Beam: 15 metres (49 ft)
- Draught: 4.7 metres (15 ft)
- Propulsion: 2 x NORMO diesel engines
- Speed: 14 knots (26 km/h; 16 mph)

Solidaire is a former offshore supply vessel operated under the German flag by the Argentinian NGO 'Solidaire' for the rescue of migrants who are in distress in the Mediterranean Sea. The ship is 66 metres (217 ft) long and has the MMSI 211131900.

== Ship's history ==
The ship was build in 2000 as Havila Star, sailing under the Norwegian flag. In March 2007 Havila Star was renamed as Ocean Spey. In May 2022, following purchase by Enrique Piñeyro, the ship sailed with Proactiva Open Arms as Open Arms Uno, under the Spanish flag. In August 2023 the name became Thebacklash, and in September 2024 Solidaire.

== Background ==
Together with his wife Carla Calabrese, Enrique Piñeyro co-founded the NGO Solidaire. Having previously donated Open Arms Uno to Proactiva Open Arms, in 2024, the ship was renamed and launched as Solidaire, to further the NGO's aims to assist migrants in danger on the Mediterranean Sea.

== Operations ==
Solidaire began operations with the rescue of a group of 41 people, who were subsequently disembarked at Salerno in October 2024. One mission in April 2025 saw 53 people rescued. Another rescue took place in May 2025. After a sortie in September 2025, 265 people were rescued, 262 of whom were disembarked at Livorno.

In January 2026 Solidaire brought 33 migrants to Italy. On 1 February 2026 the activists transported another 21 migrants to Taranto. These originated allegedly from Pakistan, Eritrea, Libya and Egypt.

On 12 May 2026 the Solidaire transported some 152 migrants to Bari, who had been picked up 33 miles off the Libyan coast earlier. The people originated from Egypt, Bangladesh and Pakistan.

After rescuing migrants south of Malta the ship returned to Italy and on 14 June 2026 the activists disembarked 23 migrants, who were designated as unaccompanied minors, at Civitavecchia and another 35 at Livorno. The majority were of Bangladeshi origin.

On 23 June 2026 the activists transported 43 migrants to La Spezia. 5 were female and 7 were identified as unaccompanied minors. They all originated from sub-Saharan Africa.

On 4 September 2026 the ship unloaded 54 migrants at Livorno. 26 were from Bangladesh, 21 from Pakistan, 3 from Iraq, 2 from Egypt, one from Nigeria and one from Ethiopia. 12 claimed to be unaccompanied minors.
