= Cama adentro =

- Spanish theatrical release poster
- Directed by: Jorge Gaggero
- Written by: Jorge Gaggero
- Produced by: Executive Producer: Verónica Cura
- Starring: Norma Aleandro; Norma Argentina; Marcos Mundstock
- Cinematography: Javier Julia
- Edited by: Guillermo Represa
- Distributed by: Aqua Films
- Release dates: September 21, 2004 (Spain); May 26, 2005 (Argentina)
- Running time: 83 minutes
- Countries: Argentina; Spain
- Language: Spanish

Cama adentro (English: Live-in Maid) is a 2004 Argentine-Spanish political satire drama film written and directed by Jorge Gaggero. In Spain it is also known as Señora Beba. It was executive produced by Aqua Films' Verónica Cura. It stars Norma Aleandro, Norma Argentina and Marcos Mundstock.

The story is set in Buenos Aires before and during Argentina's 2001 economic crisis, and depicts the transformation of Argentinian society through the lives and relationship of two very different women: Beba, a spoiled, temperamental member of the Argentina upper middle class (Aleandro), and her longtime maid, Dora (Argentina) both in their 50s.

== Plot ==
Beba used to be a well-to-do socialite but Argentina's rising economic crisis between 1998 and 2002 has left her with almost nothing. She is then forced to sell beauty products door-to-door.

On the other hand, Dora came to Buenos Aires during her teenage years from the Chaco Province to work as a full-time maid at Beba's apartment. Since then she has slowly worked to build a house in one of the towns outside Buenos Aires. Dora, however, is unable to complete the construction of her house because Beba owes her six months pay. Dora, tired of listening to Beba's promises of payment, is now determined to resign. Beba asks her for more time to get the money together and Dora accepts. During this period Beba tries to use the confidence of Dora and discourages her from venturing into a new phase of her life.

Finally, Dora leaves the apartment to live with Miguel, her boyfriend, at her new home. Meanwhile, at Beba's apartment, the power and telephone services are cut due to lack of payment. Dora visits a lonely and disheveled Beba in her now unkempt home on her birthday. Much to Beba's disappointment, Dora must leave after only a short while, explaining that she is awaiting a call from an employment agency. Beba gives Dora her letter of recommendation.

When summer arrives Beba is forced to rent out her apartment and move to a smaller place. She goes in a moving truck to Dora's house, with the intention of giving her much of her furniture. Dora invites Beba to stay the night in her house. It is then clear that Beba will live with Dora in the latter's house.

== Cast ==
- Norma Aleandro as Beba Pujol
- Norma Argentina as Dora
- Marcos Mundstock as Víctor
- Raúl Panguinao as Miguel
- Elsa Berenguer as Sara
- Susana Lanteri as Memé
- Claudia Lapacó as Perla
- Mónica Gonzaga as Irma
- Eduardo Rodríguez as Luisito
- Arturo Goetz as Invitado en el Country

== Distribution ==
The film was first presented at the San Sebastián International Film Festival, Spain on September 21, 2004. It opened in Argentina on May 26, 2005.

The film was screened at various film festivals, including: the Sundance Film Festival, United States; the Tromsø International Film Festival, Norway; the Toulouse Latin America Film Festival, France; and others.

== Critical reception ==
Cama Adentro garnered mostly positive reviews from film critics. On review aggregate website Rotten Tomatoes, the film holds an overall 100% approval rating based on 32 reviews, with a rating average of 7.8/10. The site's consensus is that the film is "an insightful character piece with standout performances and a poignant slice of Argentina life." At Metacritic, which assigns a weighted mean rating out of 0–100 reviews from film critics, the film has a rating score of 78 based on 14 reviews, classified as a generally favorably reviewed film.

Film critic A.O. Scott, who writes for The New York Times, liked the film and wrote, the film "is modest in scope but large in spirit and ambition, and very nearly perfect in execution." Scott later named it the 6th best film of 2007 (tying with 12:08 East of Bucharest).

Deborah Young, film critic at Variety magazine, liked the film and wrote, "A live-in maid leaves the pretentious employer who can no longer pay her in Jorge Gaggero's well-written first feature, Live-In Maid. Taking a different approach to describe the effects of Argentina's down-sliding economy, pic's a fairly successful attempt at satire, though given the subject, there's a lot of darkness under the carpet...Pic's real treat is non-pro actress Argentina's beautiful portrait of Dora, who stoically bears years of humiliation from Beba but is unable to rejoice once the tables are turned."

The Hollywood Reporter's film critic James Greenberg, wrote of the film, "The small, well-acted chamber drama is a genre that has virtually disappeared from American screens, which is too bad when you see one as accomplished as Live-in Maid. Powered by two first-rate performances, Jorge Gaggero's debut feature is full of psychological nuance and keen social observation. It's an impressive feat and one that should find an audience in art houses worldwide."

Critic Eric Snider like the acting in the film, and wrote, "Where it excels is in its casting: Norma Aleandro and Norma Argentina are absolutely perfect, both separately and as a team. Aleandro, an Argentine film veteran, has the look of a woman who wants to be imperious but can no longer afford it, the face of someone trying to keep her dignity. Beba treats Dora poorly, but only because she is too proud to admit she loves her like a sister."

== Awards ==
Wins

- Brussels Film Festival: Norma Aleandro, Best Latin American actress; 2004.
- Sundance Film Festival: Special Jury Prize, World Cinema Dramatic Competition; 2005.
- Toulouse Film Festival: FIPRESCI Award; Best First Feature Film; 2005.
- Tromsø International Film Festival: Special Mention of the Jury; 2005.
- Argentine Film Critics Association Awards: Silver Condor Best First Film, Jorge Gaggero; Best New Actress, Norma Argentina; 2006.
- Premios ACE: Premio ACE Cinema; Best Character Actress Norma Aleandro; Cinema, Best First Work, Jorge Gaggero; 2006.

Nominations

- Sundance Film Festival: Grand Jury Prize, World Cinema - Dramatic, Jorge Gaggero; 2005.
- Argentine Film Critics Association Awards: Silver Condor, Best Actress, Norma Aleandro; Best Art Direction, Marcela Bazzano; Best Director, Jorge Gaggero; Best Editing, Guillermo Represa; Best Original Screenplay, Jorge Gaggero; 2006.
