= Buenos Aires 100 km =

- Theatrical release poster
- Directed by: Pablo José Meza
- Written by: Pablo José Meza
- Produced by: Pablo José Meza; Natacha Rébora; Pepe Salvia; Eric Lagesse
- Starring: Juan Ignacio Pérez Roca; Emiliano Fernández; Alan Ardel; Hernán Wainstein; Juan Pablo Bazzini
- Cinematography: Carla Stella
- Edited by: Andrés Tambornino
- Music by: Nicolás Olivera
- Distributed by: Panda Filmes
- Release dates: December 8, 2004 (Morocco); February 10, 2005 (Argentina)
- Running time: 93 minutes
- Countries: Argentina; France; Spain
- Language: Spanish

Buenos Aires 100 km is a 2004 Argentine, French, and Spanish, film, written and directed by Pablo José Meza. The picture features Juan Ignacio Perez Roca, Emiliano Fernández, Alan Ardel, Hernan Wainstein, Juan Pablo Bazzini, among others.

The film, partly funded by INCAA, tells a coming-of-age story in a town 100 kilometers from Buenos Aires.

== Plot ==
A group of five friends around thirteen years old begin to understand that life is not simply about riding bicycles, playing soccer games, or, if they can, enjoying the summer.

Guido (Alan Ardel) works under his father's orders and is sometimes rewarded with a beating.

Damián (Juan Pablo Bazzini) is an adopted child and, as such, suffers from an identity crisis that typically marks the teenage years.

Matías (Hernan Wainstein) is left outside his own house every night by his hateful parents.

Alejo (Emiliano Fernández) discovers that his mother has a lover and that women have desires and men have their failures.

Esteban (Juan Ignacio Perez Roca) is the goal-keeper of the football team and, as such, has the central role among his friends. Esteban draws his generosity from his family.

With their hormones kicking in due to reaching puberty, the boys become curious about women and begin to have sexual desires, yet they still have to deal with their parents and families.

They begin to spend time outside a women's hairdressing salon.

The five boys yearn to grow older faster and dream about a place outside of their small town.

== Cast ==
- Juan Ignacio Perez Roca as Esteban
- Emiliano Fernández as Alejo
- Alan Ardel as Guido
- Hernan Wainstein as Matías
- Juan Pablo Bazzini as Damián
- Sandra Ballesteros as Raquel
- Rolly Serrano as Oscar
- Daniel Valenzuela as Horacio
- Adriana Aizemberg as Doña Anita

== Distribution ==
The film was first presented at the Marrakech International Film Festival in Morocco on December 8, 2004. It opened wide in Argentina on February 10, 2005.

The picture was screened at various film festivals, including: the Toulouse Latin America Film Festival, France; the Cartagena Film Festival, Colombia; the Gramado Film Festival, Spain; the Huelva Latin American Film Festival, Spain; the Havana Film Festival, Cuba; and others.

== Critical reception ==
Deborah Young, film critic for Variety magazine and reporting from the San Sebastián International Film Festival, gave the film a mixed review and wrote, "There's a feeling of autobiography in Pablo Jose Meza's first feature, Buenos Aires 100 km....Without the sardonic edge of similar tales like the Uruguayan 25 Watts, pic also lacks the charm of a magic tale about growing up. What's on the screen is a notch franker than most TV fare, but not structured enough to win much play outside festivals...Aside from a few well-observed scenes and moments, there are a lot of warmed-over ideas and little compelling cinema."

Sneersnipe Film Review, in a column reported from the Gramado Film Festival in Spain wrote, "Unpretentious and refreshingly touching, Pablo José Meza's film, Buenos Aires 100 KM, tells the ordinary story of a group of 5 Argentine teenagers as they approach and apprehend the adult world and its brutal vanities for the first time."

== Awards ==
Wins

- Huelva Latin American Film Festival, Spain: Best New Director, Pablo José Meza; Silver Colon, Best Screenplay, Pablo José Meza; Special Jury Award, Pablo José Meza; 2004.
- Lleida Latin-American Film Festival: Best Film, Best Original Screenplay; Pablo José Meza; 2005.

Nominations

- Marrakech International Film Festival: Golden Star, Pablo José Meza; 2004.
- Cartagena Film Festival, Colombia: Golden India Catalina; Best Film, Pablo José Meza; 2005.
- Gramado Film Festival: Golden Kikito Latin Film Competition; Best Film, Pablo José Meza; 2005.
- Argentine Film Critics Association Awards: Silver Condor; Best First Film, Pablo José Meza; 2006.
