= Marcelo Lavintman =

Argentine film cinematographer

Marcelo Lavintman (born May 1) in an Argentine film cinematographer.

== Filmography ==
- El Último sueño (1993)
- Pavana para un hombre descalzo (1996)
- Pizza, birra, faso (1998) a.k.a. Pizza, Beer, and Cigarettes
- Sólo por hoy (2001) a.k.a. Just for Today
- Marechal, o la batalla de los ángeles (2002)
- En ausencia (2002) a.k.a. In Absentia
- Yo no sé qué me han hecho tus ojos (2003) a.k.a. I Don't Know What Your Eyes Have Done to Me
- Ana y los otros (2003) a.k.a. Ana and the Others
- Amando a Maradona (2005) a.k.a. Loving Maradona
- Si sos brujo: una historia de tango (2005)
- Fuerza aérea sociedad anónima (2006)
- In the Eye Abides the Heart (2006)
- El Otro (2007) a.k.a. The Other

== Television ==
- Mujeres en rojo: Pasión (2003) (TV)
