= Roxana Darín =

Argentine actress and screenwriter (1931–2018)

- Born: 28 January 1931; Buenos Aires, Argentina
- Died: 13 September 2018 (aged 87); Buenos Aires, Argentina
- Occupations: Actress; screenwriter
- Years active: 1954–2013
- Spouse: Ricardo Darín Sr. (m. 1955; div. 1969)
- Children: Ricardo Darín; Alejandra Darín
- Relatives: Chino Darín (grandson)

Roxana Darín (28 January 1931 – 13 September 2018), also known as Reneé Roxana, was an Argentine actress and screenwriter.

== Career ==
Her acting debut came in 1952, in a radio play. She was also active in theatre. She then worked several cycles at LU9 Radio Mar del Plata in the city of Mar del Plata. When she returned to Buenos Aires, she worked alternately on Radio del Pueblo where she worked on the play The Three Musketeers and on Radio Splendid with Gala Nights, where the comedian Delfor was the presenter. She received the Premio Podestá in 2012, awarded by the Asociación Argentina de Actores. The next year, Darín was honored by the Sociedad Argentina de Gestión de Actores Intérpretes.

== Personal life ==
On Radio El Mundo, while performing in The Adventures of Zorro, she met her would be husband, actor Ricardo Darín, who was also an airplane pilot. A year later, in 1955, they got married. They had two children, also actors, a son, also named Ricardo Darín and Alejandra Darín. In 1969 she divorced her husband. For decades she lived in her comfortable apartment in the Belgrano neighborhood. In 2015, Roxana Darín had some health problems. In October 2015, the Argentine Association of Actors, an entity chaired by her daughter Alejandra, published a request for blood donors. The actress was living in her son Ricardo's house. She died on September 13, 2018.

== Selected filmography ==
- The Age of Love (1954)
- Detective (1954)
- Pimienta (1966)
- Donde duermen dos... duermen tres (1979)
- Poor Butterfly (1986)
