= El Rati Horror Show =

- Directed by: Enrique Piñeyro; Pablo Tesoriere
- Written by: Enrique Piñeyro; Pablo Galfre
- Produced by: Enrique Piñeyro; Pablo Galfre; Pablo Tesoriere
- Starring: Enrique Piñeyro; Germán Cantore; Agustín Negrussi; Andrés Bagg; Fernando Carrera
- Release date: September 16, 2010
- Running time: 86 minutes
- Country: Argentina
- Language: Spanish

El Rati Horror Show is a 2010 Argentine film directed by Enrique Piñeyro and Pablo Tesoriere and written by Piñeyro and Pablo Galfre.

== Plot ==
The film focuses on the way in which the judicial cause of Fernando Carrera was hatched. It shows the alteration of the evidence at the crime scene, the manipulation by the police taking the testimony of the few witnesses called to testify and the handling of the national media by Ruben Maugeri.
