= Pablo José Meza =

Pablo José Meza is an Argentine film producer, director, and screenplay writer. Sometimes he is credited as Pablo Meza. His debut film, Buenos Aires 100 Kilómetros, was well regarded by film critics and won many awards.

== Filmography ==
Directing, producing, and writing

- Buenos Aires 100 Kilómetros (2004)
- La Vieja de Atrás (2010)
- Las Ineses (2016)

Second Unit Director

- Herencia (2001) aka Inheritance

== Awards ==
Wins for: Buenos Aires 100 Kilómetros

- La Habana Film Festival, Cuba:Best Original Screenplay, Pablo José Meza 2001.
- Huelva Latin American Film Festival, Spain: Best New Director, Pablo José Meza; Silver Colon, Best Screenplay, Pablo José Meza; Special Jury Award, Pablo José Meza; 2004.
- Lleida Latin-American Film Festival: Best Film, Best Original Screenplay; Pablo José Meza; 2005.
- Washington Latin-American Film Festival, USA: Best Director; Pablo José Meza; 2005.
- Providence Latin-American Film Festival, USA: Best Music; Best Photography; 2005.
- Latin-American Film Festival of Viña del Mar, Chile: Special Jury award 2005.
- Cannes Film Festival: Palme d'Or 2005.

Nominations for: Buenos Aires 100 Kilómetros

- San Sebastian International Film Festival: Horizontes Latinos; 2004.
- Marrakech International Film Festival: Golden Star, Pablo José Meza; 2004.
- Cartagena Film Festival, Colombia: Golden India Catalina; Best Film, Pablo José Meza; 2005.
- Gramado Film Festival: Golden Kikito Latin Film Competition; Best Film, Pablo José Meza; 2005.
- Argentine Film Critics Association Awards: Silver Condor; Best First Film, Pablo José Meza; 2006.

Wins for: La Vieja de Atrás

- Gramado Film Festival, Brasil: Best Screenplay, Pablo José Meza; Best Actor; 2010.
- Huelva Latin American Film Festival, Spain: Best Actress; 2010

Nominations for: La Vieja de Atrás

- Mar del Plata International Film Festival: Latin American Competition; 2010.
- São Paulo International Film Festival; 2010.
- Latin American Film Festival, Utrecht, The Netherlands; 2011.
