= Austral Líneas Aéreas Flight 2553 =

1997 aviation accident in Uruguay

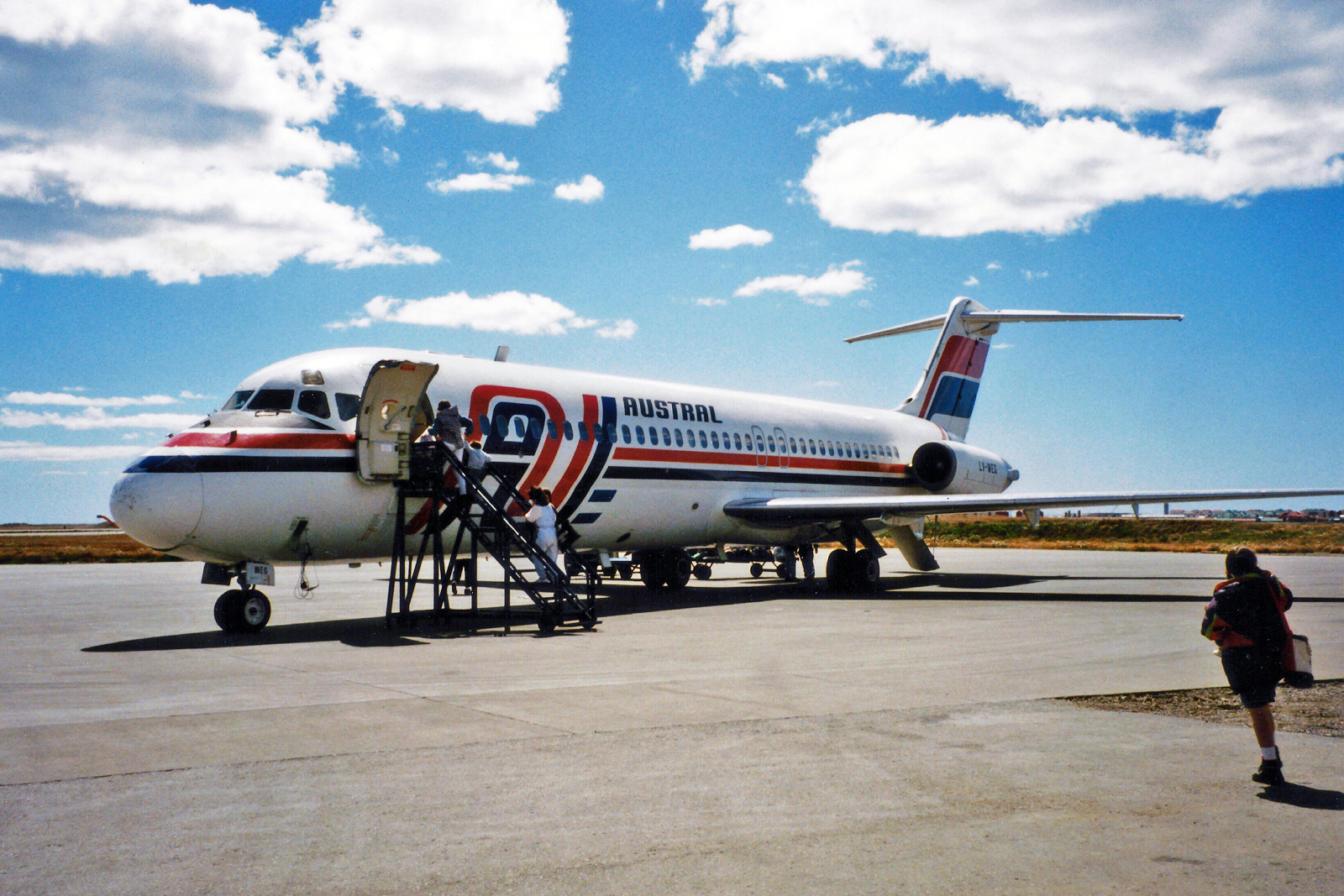
- LV-WEG, the aircraft involved in the accident, seen in 1995 with a previous livery

Accident
- Date: 10 October 1997
- Summary: Loss of control in-flight for disputed reasons
- Site: Nuevo Berlín, Uruguay; 33°01′18.5″S 57°49′20.7″W

Aircraft
- Aircraft type: McDonnell Douglas DC-9-32
- Operator: Austral Líneas Aéreas
- IATA flight No.: AU2553
- ICAO flight No.: AUT2553
- Call sign: AUSTRAL 2553
- Registration: LV-WEG
- Flight origin: Libertador General José de San Martín Airport, Posadas, Argentina
- Destination: Aeroparque Jorge Newbery, Buenos Aires, Argentina
- Occupants: 74
- Passengers: 69
- Crew: 5
- Fatalities: 74
- Survivors: 0

Austral Líneas Aéreas Flight 2553 was an Argentine domestic scheduled passenger flight from Posadas to Buenos Aires. On October 10, 1997, the McDonnell Douglas DC-9-32 that was operating the flight crashed on the lands of Estancia Magallanes, Nuevo Berlín, 32 kilometres (20 mi; 17 nmi) away from Fray Bentos, Uruguay. All 74 passengers and crew died upon impact. The accident remains the deadliest in Uruguayan history.

== Background ==
=== Aircraft ===
The aircraft involved was a McDonnell Douglas DC-9-32, registration LV-WEG. It had its maiden flight in 1969, and as of the time of the accident had flown a total of 56,854 hours and 54,800 takeoff and landing cycles.

=== Crew ===
The captain was 40-year-old Jorge Cécere, who had been with the airline since 1989 and logged 9,238 hours, including 223 hours on the DC-9. The first officer was Horacio Núñez, who was also 40. He had been with the airline since 1993 and had 2,910 flight hours. He was more experienced on the DC-9 than Captain Cécere, with 1,384 hours on that aircraft.

== Accident ==
The aircraft, which left from Posadas and was due to land in Aeroparque Jorge Newbery, Buenos Aires, was forced to divert towards Fray Bentos to avoid a storm. Examination of the aircraft's flight data recorder (FDR) revealed that shortly after the diversion occurred, the aircraft airspeed indicator began to fall to an alarmingly low indicated airspeed. Unknown to the pilots, this was caused not directly, by a loss of power, but by ice formed inside the pitot tube, which reads the airspeed for the indicator by measuring the pressure of inflow air. The ice obstructing the pitot tube reduced the air inflow, thus giving an erroneously low indicated airspeed.

In response to what they interpreted as a loss of engine power, the pilots disconnected the autopilot and gradually increased power from the engines in order to maintain airspeed. Seeing no improvement, they contacted the control tower in Ezeiza Airport and requested clearance to descend to a lower altitude. After receiving no response, the Captain decided to descend to a lower altitude to increase speed even with no clearance received from the Air Traffic Control. While descending from their assigned altitude of 35,000 feet (11,000 m) and reaching 31,700 feet (9,700 m), the Captain identified the faulty airspeed indication and ordered the First Officer to stop descending and to reduce speed, because the readings were unreliable. However, the First Officer disregarded the Captain's commands and deployed the wings' slats to maintain their altitude and lower the plane's stall speed. Consequently, at this point the airplane was actually flying at a higher speed than normal; it was descending, which further increased airspeed to a point dangerously near to V_{NE}, the "never exceed speed", above which structural damage to the aircraft might occur.

With the slats extended at a speed beyond their operational limits, one of them was torn from the aircraft, causing catastrophic asymmetry in the airflow over the wings. The aircraft immediately became uncontrollable and crashed.

== Investigation ==
According to an investigation by both the Argentine and Uruguayan Air Forces, the pitot tube—the primary instrument for measuring aircraft airspeeds—froze when the aircraft passed through a 15,000-metre (49,000 ft) high cumulonimbus cloud, blocking the instrument and causing it to give a false reading. Compounding this problem was the absence of the alarm designed to report such a malfunction (raising serious questions about inspection irregularities by the Argentine Air Force).

During the descent, the FDR recorded an increase in the airspeed from 300 km/h (160 kn; 190 mph) to 800 km/h (430 kn; 500 mph) in three seconds, which could only signify the sudden unfreezing of the pitot tube. Specialists estimated that the aircraft crashed at a 70-degree nose down attitude, at a speed of 1,200 km/h (650 kn). Depending upon the source, the crater left by the crash was 6 metres (20 ft) deep and 30 metres (98 ft) wide; 7.6 metres (25 ft) deep and 9.1 metres (30 ft) wide; or 7.6 metres (25 ft) deep and 24 metres (79 ft) wide.

== See also ==
- Air Force, Incorporated (Spanish: Fuerza Aérea Sociedad Anónima), a film by former pilot Enrique Piñeyro that attempts to explain the major causes of the crash.
- West Air Sweden Flight 294 and Copa Airlines Flight 201, both accidents where pilots reacted improperly to instrument malfunctions.
