= Norma Argentina =

Argentine actress

Norma Argentina (born 1948 in San Luis) is an Argentine actress. She works prominently in the cinema of Argentina.

== Filmography ==
- Cama Adentro (2004) a.k.a. Live-In Maid
- El buen destino (2005)
- Tupac, el grito (2005)
- Martín Fierro, el ave solitaria (2006)
- City of Your Final Destination (2007)
- The Effect of Love (2007)
- The Cat Vanishes (2011)

== Awards ==
- Argentine Film Critics Association Awards: Silver Condor; Best New Actress; for Cama adentro; 2006.
