= Whisky Romeo Zulu =

2004 film

- Theatrical release poster
- Directed by: Enrique Piñeyro
- Written by: Enrique Piñeyro; Emiliano Torres
- Produced by: Verónica Cura; Enrique Piñeyro
- Starring: Enrique Piñeyro; Mercedes Morán; Alejandro Awada
- Cinematography: Ramiro Civita
- Edited by: Alejandro Brodersohn; Jacopo Quadri
- Music by: Eduardo Criscuolo
- Distributed by: MK2 Diffusion; Aqua Films
- Release dates: September 10, 2004 (Toronto International Film Festival); April 21, 2005 (Argentina)
- Running time: 105 minutes
- Country: Argentina
- Language: Spanish

Whisky Romeo Zulu is a 2004 Argentine drama film directed by Enrique Piñeyro and written by Piñeyro and Emiliano Torres. Verónica Cura was the executive producer and Enrique Piñeyro was the producer.

The drama is based on the experiences of Enrique Piñeyro, former airline pilot turned whistle-blower, who became a film actor-director, and of the August 31, 1999 LAPA (Líneas Aéreas Privadas Argentinas) airline accident.

The LAPA Boeing 737-200 plane, LAPA flight 3142, went into flames after crashing into a mound in midtown Buenos Aires, causing the death of 65 people, and severely injuring 17. The film's basic theme: the general corrosive deregulation, the greedy cost-cutting corporations, and the corrupt government officials, found in the Argentine airline industry. The film is named after the NATO phonetic alphabet version of the identifier of the accident aircraft, LV-WRZ (Lima Victor – Whisky Romeo Zulu)

== Plot ==
The picture opens with the District Attorney, listening to voices from a recording in the black box retrieved from an air disaster. The docudrama then tells the story of director Enrique Piñeyro, who plays himself as T, a principled pilot at LAPA, an Argentine airline, upset over his company's disregard of basic safety regulations in order to save money.

When T complains, he is labeled a troublemaker by the airline company. Soon he's chastised by his fellow pilots. When things get worse he walks out of the cockpit after multiple navigational instruments are inoperative and refuses to fly. The company simply replaces him and gets another pilot to fly. Increasingly frustrated and worried about a crash, T finally writes an angry letter to his superiors, warning that a crash is inevitable if action is not taken.

The letter is leaked to the media, and the airline is sold, but the new owners want Piñeyro to retract his statement. Complicating matters, their public relations person is Marcela, a love interest from his youth. Even though Marcela is married, T pursues her. T's story is inter-cut with the District Attorney who is looking into the LAPA flight 3142 crash, and starts receiving death threats. Yanelli's character manages to bring the company’s chief executives and the Argentine Air Force authorities before a criminal court, establishing a unique precedent in commercial aviation history.

== Cast ==
- Enrique Piñeyro as T
- Mercedes Morán as Marcela
- Alejandro Awada as Gonzalo
- Carlos Portaluppi as Gordo
- Martin Slipak as Pequeño T (Little T)
- Ana Celentano as the wife of Fiscal

== Distribution ==
The picture was first presented at the Toronto International Film Festival on September 10, 2004. It opened wide in Argentina on April 21, 2005.

The film screened at various film festivals, including: the San Francisco International Film Festival, in April, 2005 the Biarritz La Cita Film Festival, France; the Flanders International Film Festival; Belgium; the Wisconsin Film Festival, United States; the Seattle International Film Festival; the World Film Festival of Bangkok; the Havana Film Festival; and others.

== Background ==
The film is a fictional reproduction of the background of LAPA Flight 3142 as seen through the eyes of Enrique Piñeyro, who was a LAPA pilot from 1988 to 1999.

Piñeyro resigned from his position in June 1999 – two months before the accident occurred- after voicing his concerns about the LAPA's safety policy. Regarding his motivation for making the film, Piñeyro said:

"I was personally interested in recounting how the accident came to occur, not the fact that the pilots forgot about the flaps and the plane blew up, but why they forgot the flaps. And what was the process, because forgetting the flaps was the straw that broke the camel's back in a series of tremendous violations of regulations. I was interested in portraying what isn't apparent about the accident, not just the final link (the pilot). Because all the links that came before were conveniently hidden because they compromised the establishment, the business."

According to producers, due to the nature of the film, a lot of the filming was done in secret. This was especially true when they filmed in airline areas. Some shots were taken with telephoto lenses.

== Critical reception ==
Film critic Pamela Troy liked the acting in the film and wrote, "Much more than a whistle blowing thriller, this beautifully made film is a powerful critique of profit-making over concern for human life."

Critic Scott Foundas, writing for FIPRESCI believes the film achieved Enrique Piñeyro's exact goal. He wrote, "Whisky Romeo Zulu ...emerges as a stirring, if obvious piece of agitprop that achieves exactly what it sets out to achieve. That is to say it works the audience up into an angry lather, and you emerge from the theater never wanting to set foot on another airplane again — at least, not if you feel you may have paid less than fair market value for the ticket." However, Foundas did not like the flashbacks to Piñeyro’s childhood which he called "gooey and nostalgic."

The film critic for Seattle's The Stranger, Andrew Wright, liked Piñeyro's directorial debut, and wrote, "[D]irector Enrique Piñeyro's utterly damning docudrama comes off as both a searing factual indictment of Argentina's passenger-flight standards, and a crackerjack thriller in its own right...It also helps that he proves to be an instinctive filmmaker, employing an intriguingly fractured, minutely detailed take on the material, which hopscotches between events leading up to the easily avoidable incident, and a harried investigator's efforts to make sense of the flight recordings afterward."

== Awards ==
Wins

- Biarritz La Cita International Film Festival: Best Film; Official Jury Award; 2004.
- Havana Film Festival: Coral Award; Best Feature Film debut; Cultural Diversity Award; 2004.
- Buenos Aires International Festival of Independent Cinema: Best Film – Audience Award, National Film; Best Film – Signis Award; 2004.
- Viña del Mar International Film Festival: Best Actor Award to Enrique Piñeyro; 2004.
- Bahamas International Film Festival: "Spirit of Freedom" Jury Mention; 2004.
- Latin American Festival of Film and Video: Special Jury Award; Best Film – Critics Association Award; Brazil; 2005.
- Lleida Latin-American Film Festival: Best Director; Enrique Piñeyro; 2005.

Nominations

- Argentine Film Critics Association Awards: Silver Condor, Best Art Direction, Cristina Nigro; Best Cinematography, Ramiro Civita; Best Editing, Jacopo Quadri; Best First Film, Enrique Piñeyro; Best Original Screenplay, Enrique Piñeyro; Best Sound, Marcos De Aguirre; Best Supporting Actor, Alejandro Awada; 2006.
