= Sandra Gugliotta =

Sandra Gugliotta (born July 13, 1969, in Buenos Aires) is an Argentine film director, screenplay writer, and producer.

According to film critic Joel Poblete, who writes for Mabuse, a cinema magazine, Sandra Gugliotta is one of the members of the so-called "New Argentina Cinema" which began c. 1998.

== Filmography ==
Directing

- Noches áticas (1995)
- Un Día de suerte (2002) aka A Lucky Day
- Las Vidas posibles (2006) aka Possible Lives

== Awards ==
Wins

- Berlin International Film Festival: Caligari Film Award; Don Quixote Award - Special Mention; 2002.
- Ankara Flying Broom International Women's Film Festival: FIPRESCI Prize; 2002.

Nominations

- Argentine Film Critics Association Awards: Silver Condor; Best First Film, Sandra Gugliotta; 2003.
- Buenos Aires International Festival of Independent Cinema: Best Film, Sandra Gugliotta; 2002.
- Goya Awards: Goya; Best Spanish Language Foreign Film, Sandra Gugliotta; 2003.
- Miami Latin Film Festival: Golden Egret Best Film; Sandra Gugliotta; 2003.
