= Nuevo Berlín =

- Town
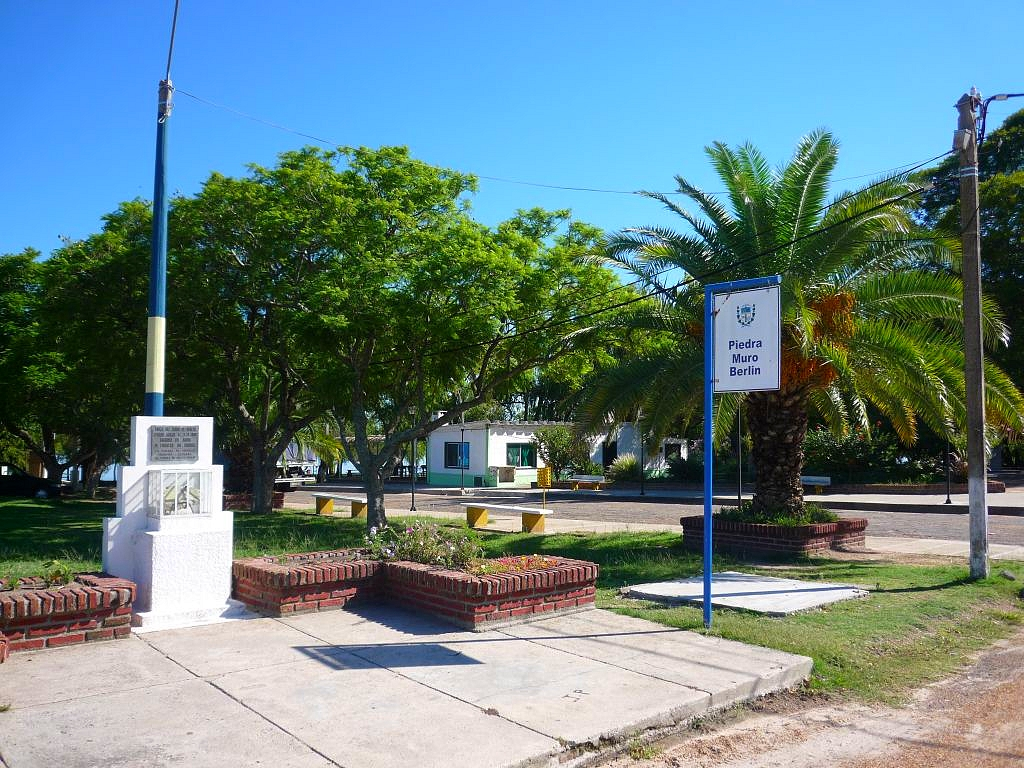
- Memorial with stone from the Berlin Wall

- Location within Uruguay
- Coordinates: 32°58′45″S 58°3′10″W
- Country: Uruguay
- Department: Río Negro Department
- Elevation: 10 m (33 ft)

Population (2011)
  - Total: 2,450
- Time zone: UTC−3
- Postal code: 65002
- Dial plan: +598 4568 (+4 digits)

Nuevo Berlín (New Berlin) is a town in the Río Negro Department of western Uruguay.

== Geography ==
It is located on the east bank of Uruguay River 7 kilometres (4.3 mi; 3.8 nmi) northwest of the junction of Route 24 with Route 20. South of the town flows the stream Arroyo de la Yeguada and to its west, in the Uruguay River, is the island Isla del Burro. Its distance from the capital of the department Fray Bentos is 42 kilometres (26 mi) via Route 42 and Route 2.

== History ==
In the 19th century, some German settlements were created next to the river, mostly composed of farmers. The brothers Richard and Karl Wendelstandt migrated from Germany around 1850 and bought the farm "El Curupí" in the Department of Soriano. Some years later, they bought properties in Paysandú which they renamed as Nueva Mehlem (New Mehlem). This new farm, with some 27,000 hectares was surrounded by 32 "positions", 31 of which were occupied by other German families.

Meanwhile, the Wendelstandt family in Germany decided to invest in their relatives' properties in Uruguay. With these investments, the surroundings of "Nueva Mehlem" farm became the village Nuevo Berlín around 1865–1868, with the approval of the brothers Wendelstandt, who requested Mr. Fridolin Quincke to design it. The task was finished by the end of 1874.

On 16 March 1875, it was declared a "Pueblo" (village) and on 19 December 1974 its status was elevated to "Villa" (town) by the Act of Ley Nº 14.326.

== Population ==
In 2011 Nuevo Berlín had a population of 2,450.

Year	Population
1908	1,454
1963	1,912
1975	2,659
1985	2,097
1996	2,366
2004	2,438
2011	2,450

Source: National Statistics Institute of Uruguay

== Air disaster ==
On 10 October 1997, a Douglas DC-9-32, en route from Posadas, Misiones to Buenos Aires, crashed near the town after entering a storm. All 74 occupants of the plane perished in the crash.

== Notable people ==
- Giorgian de Arrascaeta, footballer
