= Líneas Aéreas Privadas Argentinas =

Airline based in Buenos Aires, Argentina (1977–2003)

Líneas Aéreas Privadas Argentinas (LAPA)

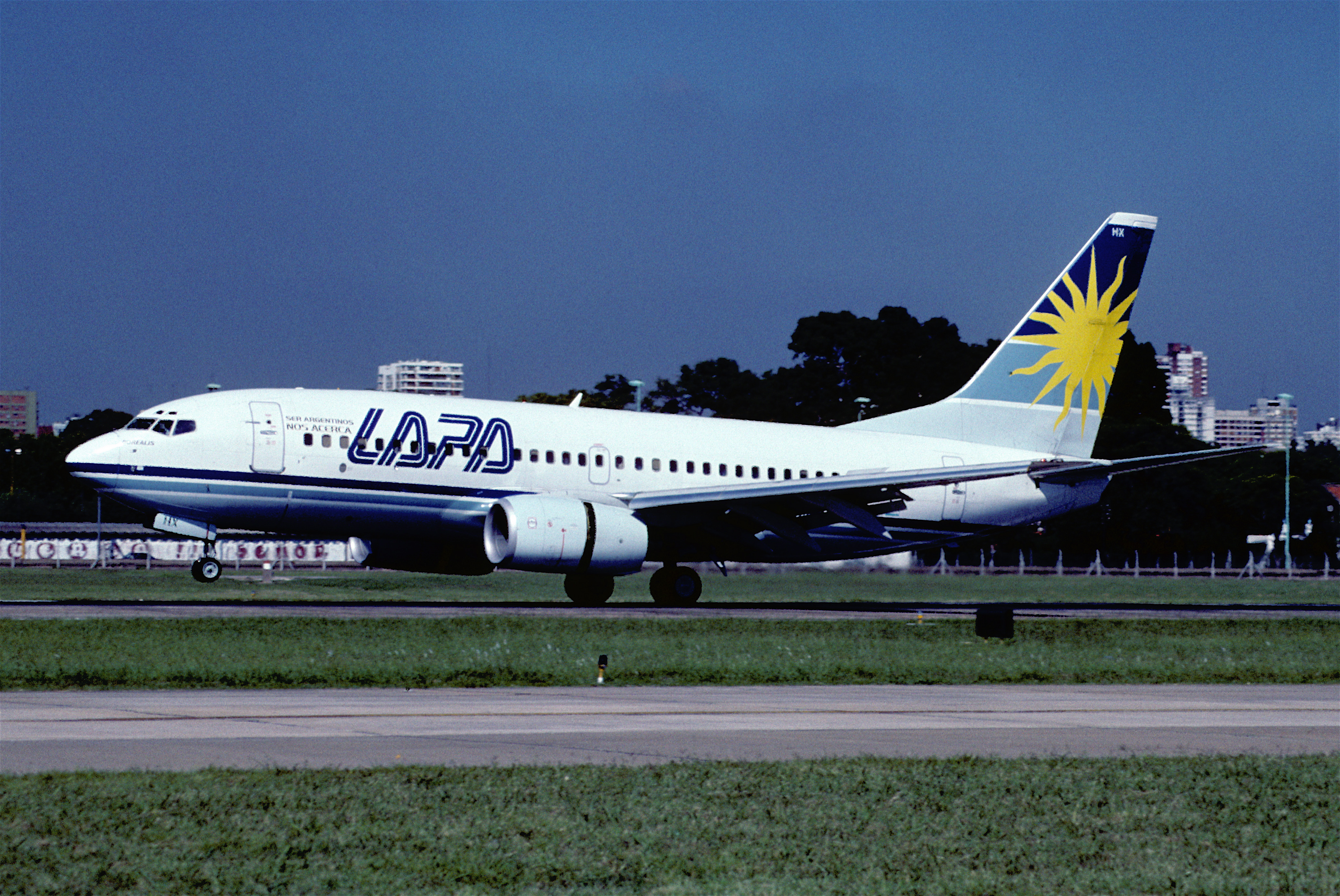
- LAPA Boeing 737-76N
| IATA | ICAO | Call sign |
|---|---|---|
| MJ | LPR | LAPA |
- Founded: 1977
- Ceased operations: April 2003; 23 years ago
- Hubs: Aeroparque Jorge Newbery
- Secondary hubs: Ministro Pistarini International Airport
- Fleet size: 5 (at the time of closure)
- Destinations: 19 (at the time of closure)
- Headquarters: Buenos Aires, Argentina
- Key people: Gustavo Deutsch (President); Ronaldo Boyd (General director)
- Website: lapa.com.ar

Líneas Aéreas Privadas Argentinas (English: Private Argentine Air Lines), more commonly known by the acronym LAPA (and known as ARG Argentina Línea Privada and AIRG from 2001 to 2002), was an airline based in Buenos Aires, Argentina. At its heyday, the carrier operated international services to the United States and Uruguay, as well as an extensive domestic network within Argentina. Additionally, the company also operated charter services. Domestic and regional flights were operated from downtown's Aeroparque Jorge Newbery, whereas an international service to Atlanta was operated from Ministro Pistarini International Airport. LAPA was the first carrier to break a monopolistic market controlled by Aerolíneas Argentinas and its sister company Austral Líneas Aéreas, offering competitive prices.

It ceased operations in April 2003 after declaring bankruptcy.

== History ==
The airline was formed in 1977, initially aimed at providing internal services within the Buenos Aires Province. In May 1978, it was authorised to operate charter services to cities in the Americas, and scheduled services began the following year. By July 1980, the major shareholder of the company was Claudio Zichy-Thyssen; the fleet comprised three YS-11As and a Piper Cheyenne that worked on a domestic passenger and cargo network serving Concordia, Ezeiza Airport, Gualeguaychu, La Plata, Necochea, Olavarria, Parana, Pehuajo, San Nicolas and Tres Arroyos. Gustavo Deutsch acquired the company in 1984, when it had a network consisting of two domestic routes served with a single propeller aircraft.

In January 1987, the airline became the first South American operator of the Saab 340. The carrier started a period of major growth in 1993 when it gained permissions to fly to Bariloche, Córdoba, Iguazú and Mar del Plata. A year later, the route network included 17 destinations, served with three aircraft. At March 1995, LAPA had 60 employees; the fleet consisted of one Beech B-58 Baron, one Beech King Air 500, two Boeing 737s and two Saab 340s that worked on routes to Bariloche, Colonia, Córdoba, Iguazú, Mar del Plata, Mendoza, Montevideo and Villa Gessel. LAPA became a Boeing 757 operator in September 1995 when it took possession of its first aircraft of the type. By late 1996, LAPA had a 30% of domestic market share.

=== Change of ownership and name ===
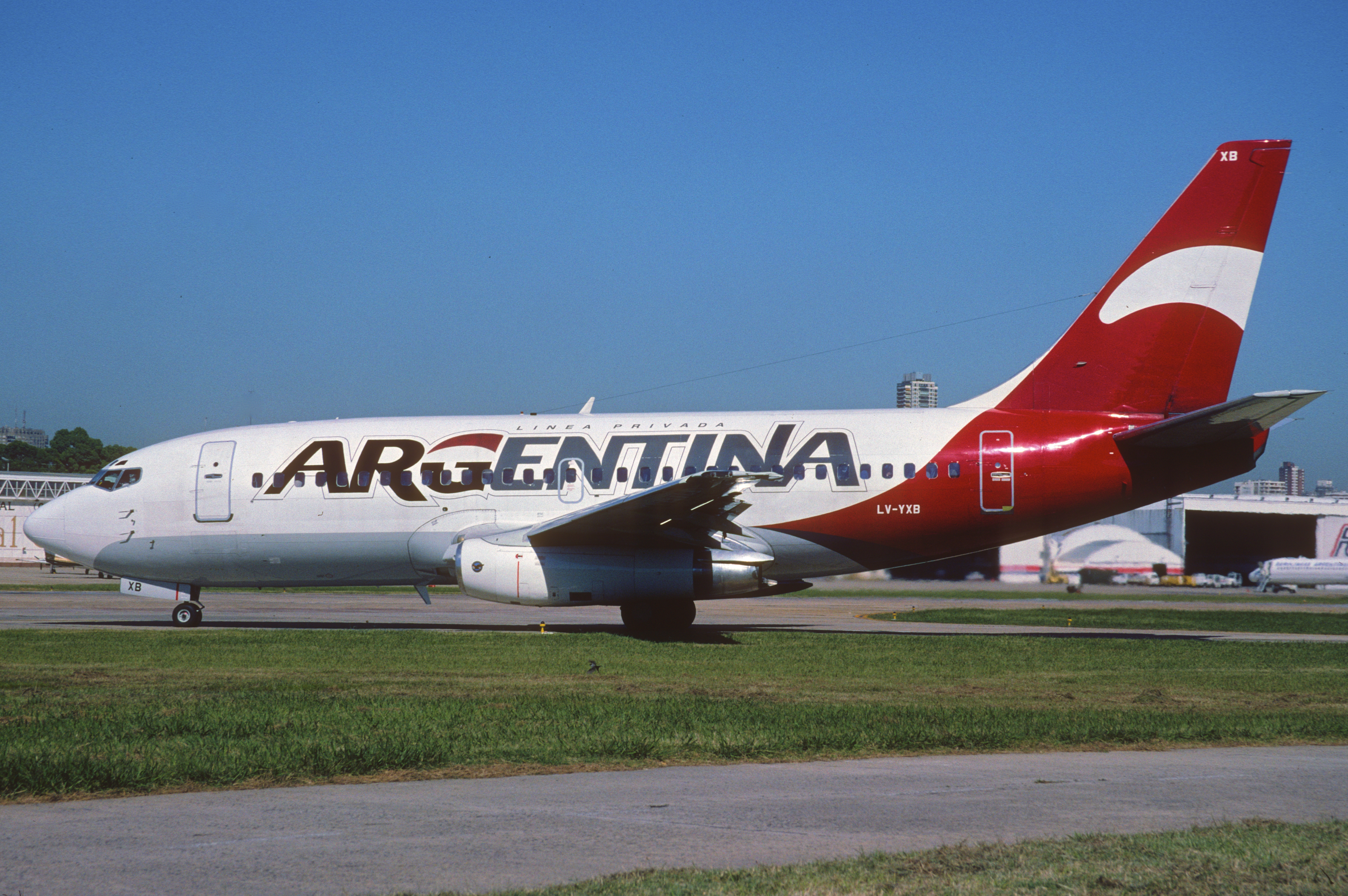
Boeing 737-200 LV-YXB in ARG livery

On 27 September 2001 the airline changed its name to ARG Argentina Línea Privada following the acquisition of the company by Eduardo Eurnekian. Aircraft were painted in a new livery, displaying the acronym ARG on both sides of the fuselage. This situation prompted an issue with the airline's name, as ARG is the ICAO airline code for Aerolíneas Argentinas. In mid-2002 the name of the airline was changed to AIRG. Bolivian airline AeroSur and four Argentine investors acquired the airline on 29 August 2002, and the original name LAPA was restored.

=== Downfall and ceased operations ===
The company filed for bankruptcy protection in May 2001, and ceased operations in April 2003, after three of its five aircraft were repossessed by the lessors.

== Destinations ==
The airline had its heyday following the deregulation of the Argentine air market in 1994; it operated an extensive domestic network, as well as international services to Atlanta, Montevideo and Punta del Este.

The list of destinations served at the time of closure in 2003 were Buenos Aires, Comodoro Rivadavia, Córdoba, El Calafate, Florianópolis, Iguazú, Mendoza, Puerto Madryn, Puerto Montt, Salta, San Carlos de Bariloche, San Juan, San Luis, Santa Cruz de la Sierra, Santiago de Chile, São Paulo, Trelew, Tucumán, and Ushuaia. During the course of its history, LAPA served the following destinations:

| City | Airport code | | Airport name | Refs |
| City | IATA | ICAO | Airport name | Refs |
|---|---|---|---|---|
Argentina
| Bahía Blanca | BHI | SAZB | Comandante Espora Airport | |
| Bariloche | BRC | SAZS | San Carlos de Bariloche Airport | |
| Buenos Aires | AEP | SABE | Aeroparque Jorge Newbery | |
| Buenos Aires | EZE | SAEZ | Ministro Pistarini International Airport | |
| Catamarca | CTC | SANC | Coronel Felipe Varela International Airport | |
| Comodoro Rivadavia | CRD | SAVC | General Enrique Mosconi International Airport | |
| Concordia | COC | SAAC | Concordia Airport | |
| Corrientes | CNQ | SARC | Doctor Fernando Piragine Niveyro International Airport | |
| Córdoba | COR | SACO | Ingeniero Aeronáutico Ambrosio L.V. Taravella International Airport | |
| El Calafate | FTE | SAWC | Comandante Armando Tola International Airport | |
| Formosa | FMA | SARF | Formosa International Airport | |
| General Roca | GNR | SAHR | Dr. Arturo Umberto Illia Airport | |
| Gualeguaychú | GHU | SAAG | Gualeguaychú Airport | |
| Iguazú | IGR | SARI | Cataratas del Iguazú International Airport | |
| Jujuy | JUJ | SASJ | Gobernador Horacio Guzmán International Airport | |
| La Plata | LPG | SADL | La Plata Airport | |
| La Rioja | IRJ | SANL | Capitán Vicente Almandos Almonacid Airport | |
| Mar del Plata | MDQ | SAZM | Ástor Piazzolla International Airport | |
| Mendoza | MDZ | SAME | El Plumerillo International Airport | |
| Necochea | NEC | SAZO | Necochea Airport | |
| Neuquén | NQN | SAZN | Presidente Perón International Airport | |
| Olavarría | OVR | SAZF | Olavarria Airport | |
| Paraná | PRA | SAAP | General Justo José de Urquiza Airport | |
| Pehuajó | PEH | SAZP | Comodoro P. Zanni Airport | |
| Posadas | PSS | SARP | Libertador General José de San Martín Airport | |
| Puerto Madryn | PMY | SAVY | El Tehuelche Airport | |
| Resistencia | RES | SARE | Resistencia International Airport | |
| Río Gallegos | RGL | SAWG | Piloto Civil Norberto Fernández International Airport | |
| Río Grande | RGA | SAWE | Hermes Quijada International Airport | |
| Salta | SLA | SASA | Martín Miguel de Güemes International Airport | |
| San Juan | UAQ | SANU | Domingo Faustino Sarmiento Airport | |
| San Luis | LUQ | SAOU | Brigadier Mayor César Raúl Ojeda Airport | |
| Trelew | REL | SAVT | Almirante Marcos A. Zar Airport | |
| Tres Arroyos | OYO | SAZH | Tres Arroyos Airport | |
| Tucumán | TUC | SANT | Teniente General Benjamín Matienzo International Airport | |
| Ushuaia | USH | SAWH | Malvinas Argentinas International Airport | |
| Villa Gesell | VLG | SAZV | Villa Gesell Airport | |
| Villa Mercedes | VME | SAOR | Villa Reynolds Airport | |
Bolivia
| Santa Cruz de la Sierra | VVI | SLVR | Viru Viru International Airport | |
Chile
| Puerto Montt | PMC | SCTE | El Tepual Airport | |
| Santiago de Chile | SCL | SCEL | Arturo Merino Benítez International Airport | |
Brazil
| Florianópolis | FLN | SBFL | Hercílio Luz International Airport | |
| São Paulo | GRU | SBGR | Guarulhos Airport | |
United States
| Atlanta | ATL | KATL | Hartsfield International Airport | |
Uruguay
| Colonia | CYR | SUCA | Colonia Airport | |
| Montevideo | MVD | SUMU | Carrasco International Airport | |

== Fleet ==
Prior to its bankruptcy in April 2003, the most modern aircraft in the fleet, such as the brand-new Boeing 737-700s, Boeing 757-200s, as well as a single Boeing 767-300ER the company flew the Buenos Aires–Atlanta route with, were gradually returned to their lessors throughout 2001 and 2002, as their leases proved too expensive. When LAPA ceased operations in April 2003, only three of its remaining five Boeing 737-200 Advanced were operational.

The company operated the following aircraft throughout its history:

- BAC 1-11 400
- Boeing 737-200
- Boeing 737-200 Advanced
- Boeing 737-200C
- Boeing 737-700
- Boeing 757-200
- Boeing 767-300ER
- Embraer EMB 110 Bandeirante
- Piper Cheyenne
- Piper Cheyenne II
- Saab 340
- Short 330
- YS-11A-300

== Accidents and incidents ==
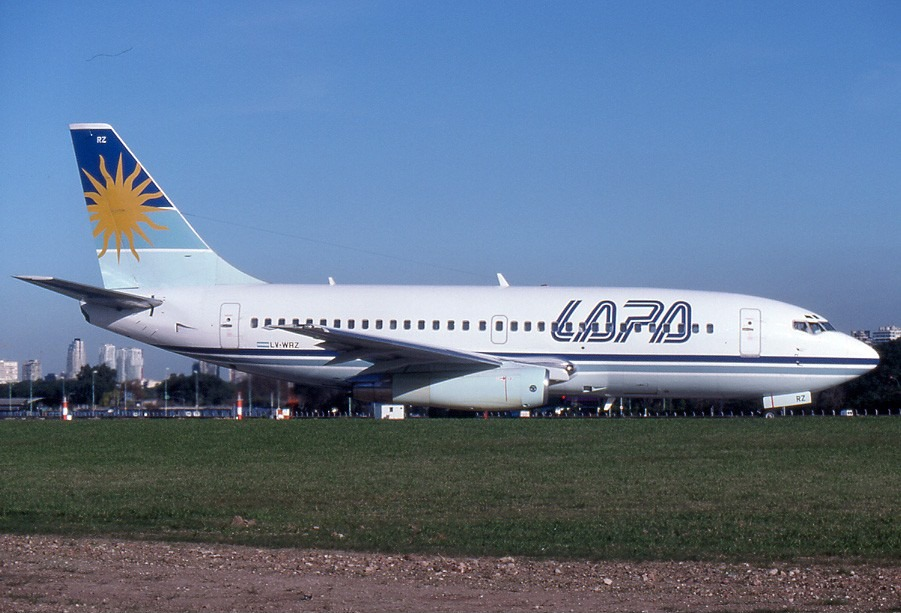
Boeing 737-200C LV-WRZ, which crashed as LAPA Flight 3142, 1999

- 31 August 1999: Flight 3142, a Boeing 737-200C, registration LV-WRZ, that operated a scheduled Buenos Aires–Córdoba passenger service, crashed during takeoff from Aeroparque Jorge Newbery after it failed to get airborne. Unable to stop, the aircraft overshot the runway, hit the perimeter fence at a speed greater than 250 kilometres per hour (130 kn; 160 mph), hit a car while crossing an avenue, collided with a wall and heavy construction machinery, came to rest on a golf course, and burst into flames less than a minute later. Out of 103 occupants of the plane, 63 died in the accident, plus two ground casualties. The accident remains the third deadliest one in the Argentine aviation history, behind Aerolíneas Argentinas Flight 644 and Austral Líneas Aéreas Flight 2553.

== See also ==
- List of airlines of Argentina
- List of defunct airlines of South America
- Transport in Argentina
