= Ojos de fuego =

Ojos de Fuego
- Directed by: Jorge Gaggero
- Written by: Jorge Gaggero; Mathias Oks
- Produced by: Rosario Luna
- Starring: Erasmo Olivera; Jorge Huertas
- Cinematography: Daniel Sotelo
- Edited by: Hernán Belón
- Music by: Sebastian Schon
- Release date: May 19, 1995
- Running time: 15 min.
- Country: Argentina
- Language: Spanish

Ojos de Fuego (Eyes of Fire) is a 1995 Argentine independent short film written and directed by Jorge Gaggero.

== Cast ==
- Erasmo Olivera as Julian
- Jorge Huertas as Comisario
- Victor Poleri as Rengo
- Eva Fernandez as Madre de Julian
- Leandro Martínez as Laucha
