= Jorge Gaggero =

Argentinian film director and screenwriter

Jorge Gaggero is an Argentinian film director and screenwriter.

He works in the cinema of Argentina.

== Filmography ==
- Sólo cuando respiro (1994)
- Ojos de fuego (1995)
- Un Pedazo de tierra (2001) a.k.a. A Piece of Earth
- The Secret Sea (2002)
- Cama Adentro (2004) a.k.a. Live-In Maid
- Vida en Falcon (2005)
- Montenegro (2011)
