= Enrique Piñeyro (actor) =

Argentinian film director, actor, and pilot

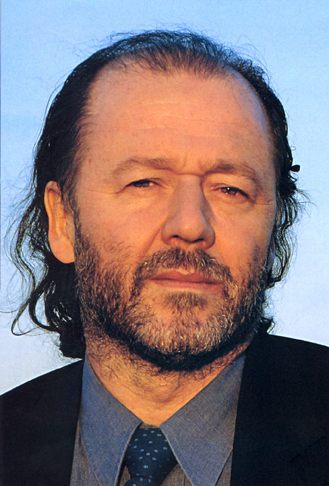
- Enrique Piñeyro, 2015
- Born: 9 December 1956 (age 69); Genoa, Italy
- Occupations: Actor, director, producer, aeronautical physician, crash investigator, screenplay writer

Enrique Piñeyro (born December 9, 1956, in Genoa, Italy) is an Argentine-Italian film actor, producer, crash analyst, aeronautical physician, film director, screenplay writer and retired airline pilot working partly in Argentina. Piñeyro owns Aquafilms, a film production company in Argentina.

== Biography ==
Piñeyro was born in Genoa, Italy, in 1956. His mother, Marcela, was a member of the billionaire Rocca family, which controls the industrial conglomerate Techint. Piñeyro graduated as a doctor and went on to become an airline pilot in 1988 in Argentina, where he worked at LAPA, becoming an experienced pilot (ATP certificate, Boeing 737 co-pilot, Saab 340 captain). Two months prior to the infamous LAPA flight 3142 crash, Piñeyro voiced his concerns about LAPA's safety policy. Following the plane crash, Piñeyro became somewhat of a public figure in retelling his experiences working at LAPA, which subsequently went out of business.

Piñeyro, who had already acted in films five times, went on to star a sixth time in his directorial debut, Whisky Romeo Zulu in 2004 – a partially biographical film where he recounted his battle against LAPA's safety policy before the accident. The film was generally well received, and spun a sequel of sorts, Air Force, Incorporated, a documentary that criticized the fact that in Argentina the air traffic is controlled by the Air Force. Following the film's release, the national government decided to separate the Argentine Air Force from commercial air traffic, which is now responsibility of the Secretary of Transport.

Piñeyro has been dubbed "the Michael Moore of Argentina" due to his public criticism of specific government corruption, and the favorable results attained from his filmmaking. He has also written and performed in a play called "Volar es humano, aterrizar es divino" in which he performs, together with two more actors, aeronautical sequences combined with stand-up comedy. The show has seen 10 seasons of success at prestigious Teatro Maipo, in Buenos Aires, Argentina. This show also ran at Teatros del Canal, Madrid, Spain in 2019 and 2020. It debuted in Italy with two shows in Milan in November 2022.

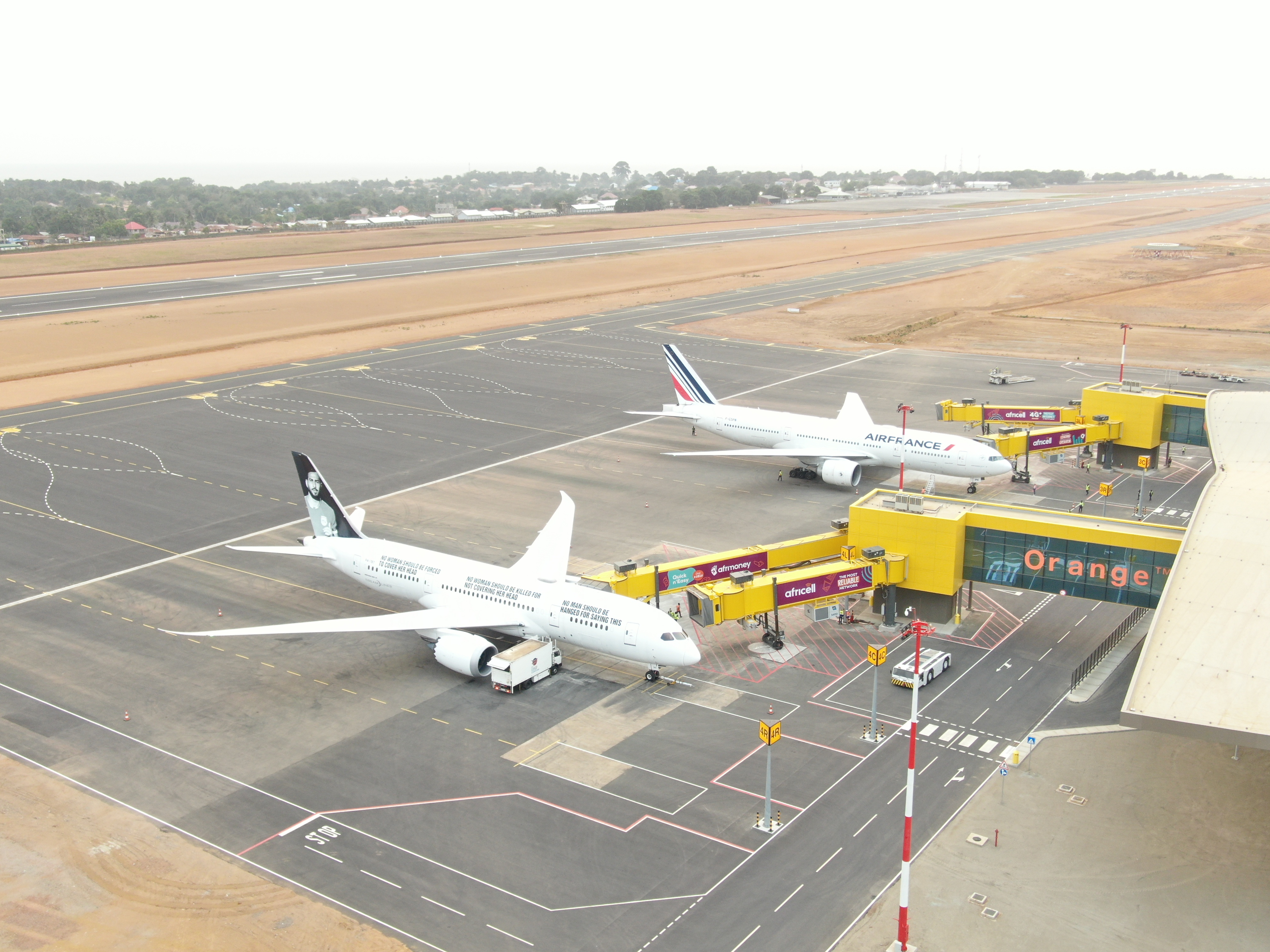
Piňeyro's Boeing 787 next to an Air France Boeing 777, at the New Freetown International Airport during the airport's 2023 inauguration

He is also the co-founder of Innocence Project Argentina, an NGO belonging to the Innocence Network, which is "dedicated to providing pro bono legal and investigative services to individuals seeking to prove innocence of crimes for which they have been convicted, working to redress the causes of wrongful convictions".

In 2022, it was announced that a Boeing 787 that he owns and uses for humanitarian flights, would carry the words "No woman should be forced to cover her head", "No woman should be killed for not covering her head" and "No man should be hanged for saying this" and feature photos of Amir Nasr-Azadani, an Iranian football player, and of Mahsa Amini, an Iranian woman accused by Iran's morality police of not wearing a veil properly and who died while at their custody, in protest of Iran's laws dictating that women must wear veils to cover their heads. The airplane was leased by Comlux Aruba, an Aruban airline company. It was due to be taken on a world tour while displaying that livery.

Together with his wife, Carla Calabrese, Piñeyro co-founded the NGO Solidaire. In 2024, the organization launched a rescue ship, Solidaire, to assist migrants in danger on the Mediterranean Sea.

== Acting filmography ==
- Alambrado (1991) a.k.a. Barbed Wire
- Olympic Garage (1999)
- Waiting for the Messiah (2000)
- Sons and Daughters (2001)
- Dormir al sol (2003)
- Whisky Romeo Zulu (2004)
- Northeast (2005)
- Air Force, Incorporated (2006)
- Hotel Tívoli (2007)
- El Rati Horror Show (2009)

== Directing filmography ==
- Whisky Romeo Zulu (2004)
- Air Force, Incorporated (2006)
- Bye Bye Life (2008)
- El Rati Horror Show (2009)

== Theatre ==
"Volar es humano, aterrizar es divino" (2014 to 2020)
