= Andrés Tambornino =

Argentine film editor, film director and screenplay writer

Andrés Tambornino is an Argentine film editor, film director, and screenplay writer.

He works in the cinema of Argentina.

== Filmography ==
Director and writer

- Aqueronte (1994)
- Dónde y cómo Oliveira perdió a Achala (1995)
- El Descanso (2002)
- Hombre Muerto (2024)

Editor

- Pizza, birra, faso (1998) a.k.a. Pizza, Beer, and Cigarettes
- Buenos Aires 100 kilómetros (2004)
- Camisea (2005)

Production designer

- Mundo grúa (1999) a.k.a. Crane World
