= Rey muerto =

- Spanish: Rey Muerto
- Directed by: Lucrecia Martel
- Screenplay by: Lucrecia Martel
- Cinematography: Esteban Sapir
- Music by: Laura Ruggiero
- Release date: 19 May 1995
- Running time: 12 minutes
- Language: Spanish

Rey Muerto is a 12-minute fictional live-action short film written and directed by Argentine filmmaker Lucrecia Martel and released 19 May 1995. It was included in Historias breves I ("Short Stories I"), the first edition of the INCAA competition, which was fundamental to the rise and recognition of the generation of Argentine filmmakers known variously as Cine Independiente Argentino or Nuevo Cine Argentino ("new" or "independent" Argentine film).

This film and other winners of a 1994 Argentine National Institute of Cinema and Audiovisual Arts short film contest were brought together to form the feature-length Historias breves, released 19 May 1995.

== Synopsis ==
The story takes place in the fictional village of Rey Muerto ("Dead King") in northeastern Argentina. A woman tries to escape a husband who has been treating her badly, bringing her three children with her.

== Cast ==
- Roly Serrano
- Sandra Ceballos
- Marcelo Machuca
- Carlos Aldana
- Lía Crucet

== Technical team ==
- Cinematography: Esteban Sapir
- Wardrobe: Alejandra Crespo
- Montage: Fernanda Rossi
- Music: Laura Ruggiero
- Sound: Horacio Almada
- Production assistant: Alejandro Arroz
- Set design: Alejandra Crespo
- Scenography: Alejandra Crespo
- Wardrobe design: Alejandra Crespo

== Reviews ==
Reviewers of Historias breves wrote:

Alejandro Ricagno in El Amante del Cine writew:

The technical aspects are, for the most part, impeccable and in service to the stories. Which is to say: they are not distracting excesses and do not undermine the structure. One might enjoy one [film] more than another...but you leave the theater...having seen a cinematic program composed of attractive short stories with diverse atmospheres and goals.

Claudio España in La Nación gices the opinion that:

The work of these young people does not seek visual artifice, and its filmic language is based on the immediate image, simple and far from excesses.

Rafael Granado in Clarín said:

very good...rare quality in all aspects...creativity in a small format.»

Manrupe and Portela add:

«...of surprising quality. One of the few innovative premieres (aesthetically and conceptually). some (Ojos de fuego; Dónde y cómo..., Rey muerto) stand out, but the general level is excellent. Much more than formal exercises.»
