= List of Argentine films of 2015 =

This is a list of Argentine films which were released in 2015:

Argentine films of 2015
Title	Director	Release	Genre
A - B
327 cuadernos	Andrés Di Tella	5 September	Documentary
7 salamancas	Marcos Pastor	5 November	Documentary
El 5 de Talleres	Adrián Biniez	26 March	Comedy Romance/Drama
´87: Ochentaisiete	Anahi Hoeneisen y Daniel Andrade	10 December	Romance
Abzurdah	Daniela Goggi	4 June	Drama
El acto en cuestión (reestreno)	Alejandro Agresti	30 April	Drama
Alfonsina	Christoph Kühn	4 June	Documentary
El almuerzo	Javier Torre	29 October	Histórica/Drama
Anconetani	Gustavo Cataldi, Silvia Di Florio	2 July	Documentary
A puro gesto, un ritual de tango	Gabriel Reich	30 July	Documentary
Aventurera	Leonardo D'Antoni	6 August	Comedy
Baires	Marcelo Páez-Cubells	8 October	Policial negro
Los besos	Jazmin Carballo	16 July	Drama
Boca Juniors 3D	Rodrigo Vila (director)	27 August	Documentary
Bolishopping	Pablo Stigliani	11 June	Drama
C - D
Cabeza de ratón	Ivo Aichenbaum	27 August	Documentary
La calle de los pianistas	Mariano Nante	11 June	Documentary
La ceremonia	Darío Arcella	13 August	Documentary
Choele	Juan Sasiain	7 May	Drama
Ciencias naturales	Matías Lucchesi	3 September	Drama
El ciudadano ilustre	Gastón Duprat	10 September	Drama
Ciudades de lluvia	Juan González Lanuza	12 February	Documentary
El Clan	Pablo Trapero	20 August	Biopic
Cómo funcionan casi todas las cosas	Fernando Salem		Drama
Cómo ganar enemigos	Gabriel Lichtmann	15 October	Comedy
Congreso	Luis Fontal	28 May	Comedy drama
Contrasangre	Nacho Garassino	26 November	Policial
Cuarenta balas - El caso Fischer-Bufano	Nacho Garassino	26 March	Documentary
Cuerpo de letra	Julián D'Angiolillo	1 October	Documentary
Damiana Kryygi	Alejandro Fernández Mouján	21 May	Documentary
El desafío	Juan Manuel Rampoldi	9 April	Comedy Romance
El desierto	Christoph Behl	29 January	Comedy Romance
Después de Sarmiento	Francisco Márquez	10 September	Documentary
Los dioses de agua	Pablo Cesar	25 June	adventures/Drama
Dólares de arena	Laura Amelia Guzmán y Israel Cárdenas	23 July	Drama
E - H
Ellos te eligen	Mario Levit	3 September	Documentary
Las enfermeras de Evita	Marcelo Goyeneche	19 March	Documentary
Escuchar a Dios	Mariano Baez	26 February	Documentary
El espejo de los otros	Marcos Carnevale	3 September	Comedy
Eva no duerme	Pablo Agüero	5 November	Drama
Francisco de Buenos Aires	Miguel Rodríguez Arias	5 March	Documentary
Francisco: El padre Jorge	Beda Docampo Feijóo	10 September	Biopic
Gule gule, crónicas de un viaje	Inés de Oliveira Cézar	16 April	Documentary
El gurí	Sergio Mazza	19 March	Drama
Hamdan	Martín Solá	5 March	Documentary
Historias breves 11	Alejandro Nakano y otros	10 September	Comedy/Drama
Los hongos	Oscar Ruiz Navia	22 October	Drama
Hortensia	Diego Lublinsky y Álvaro Urtizberea	19 November	Comedy
Hotel Infierno	Marcos Palmieri	NA	Horror
I - L
El incendio	Juan Schnitman	28 May	Drama
Indio y los fundamentalistas del aire acondicionado	Carlos Solari	1 October	Documentary
Invasión	Abner Benaim	5 March	Documentary
Invasión alien	Ernesto Aguilar	4 June	Ciencia ficción
Kryptonita	Nicanor Loreti	3 December	action
León, reflejos de una pasión	José Glusman	30 April	Documentary
Libre de sospecha	Emilio Blanco	22 January	Policial
La lluvia es también no verte	Mayra Bottero	23 July	Documentary/Drama
Locos sueltos en el zoo	Luis Barros	9 July	Comedy
El lugar del hijo	Manuel Nieto Zas	8 March	Drama
M - O
Mariposa	Marco Berger		Drama romántico
Merello x Carreras	Victoria Carreras		Documentary/Blanco y Negro
Mi amiga del parque	Ana Katz	17 September	Comedy/Drama
La Misión Argentina	Adrián Jaime	29 January	Documentary
Mis sucios 3 tonos	Juan Manuel Brignole	9 April	Comedy drama
La mujer de los perros	Laura Citarella y Verónica Llinás	3 September	Drama
Naturaleza_muerta	Gabriel Grieco	5 March	Terror
NEY, Nosotros, ellos y yo	Nicolás Avruj	5 March	Documentary
Noche de perros	Nacho Sesma	24 September	Comedy
Los ojos de América	Daiana Rosenfeld y Aníbal Garisto	20 August	Documentary
P - R
Pájaros negros	Fercks Castellani	15 October	Thriller
Papeles en el viento	Juan Taratuto	8 January	Comedy drama
La parte ausente	Galel Maidana	16 April	Drama/fantasy/suspense
La parte automática	Ivo Aichenbaum	25 June	Documentary
La parte del todo	Andrés Martínez Cantó, Santiago Nacif Cabrera y Roberto Persano	8 October	Documentary
Pasaje de vida	Diego Corsini	28 May	Drama
La patota	Santiago Mitre	18 June	suspense
El patrón: radiografía de un crimen	Sebastián Schindel	26 February	Drama
Pistas para volver a casa	Jazmín Stuart	5 March	Comedy
Placer y martirio	Jose Campusano	2 July	Drama
Polvareda	Juan Schmidt	4 March	Policial/Western
La princesa de Francia	Matías Piñeiro	6 August	Drama
El prisionero irlandés	Carlos Jaureguialzo, Marcela Silva y Nasute	25 June	Drama
Proyecto Mariposa	Sergio Costantino	9 July	Drama
Puerto Paticuá	Hernán Fernández	5 February	Documentary
Refugiados en su tierra	Fernando Molina y Nicolás Bietti	16 July	Documentary
Réimon	Rodrigo Moreno	25 June	Drama
Relámpago en la oscuridad	Germán Fernández y Pablo Montllau	2 July	Documentary
S - T
La Salada	Juan Martín Hsu	11 June	Comedy drama
Saldaño, el sueño dorado	Raúl Viarruel	30 April	Documentary
Salgán & Salgán: Un tango padre-hijo	Caroline Neal	1 October	Documentary
Se acabó la épica	Matilde Michanié	26 February	Documentary
La secta	Ernesto Aguilar	27 August	suspense
Showroom	Fernando Molnar	30 April	Drama
Si estoy perdido, no es grave	Santiago Loza	24 September	Drama
Silo	Leandro Bartoletti	17 September	Documentary
Sin hijos	Ariel Winograd	14 May	Comedy Romance
Socios por Accidente 2	Nicanor Loreti	2 July	action/adventure/Comedy
Solo	Guillermo Rocamora	2 July	Comedy drama
La sombra	Javier Olivera		Documentary
Sordo	Marcos Martínez	8 January	Documentary
Sueños acribillados	Carlos Galettini	19 November	Drama
Su realidad	Mariano Galperín	4 June	Comedy/Documentary/Drama
Territorio de vida	Fernando Lospice	19 March	Western
Testigo íntimo	Santiago Fernández Calvete	19 November	Policial
El tiempo encontrado	Eva Poncet y Marcelo Burd	23 July	Documentary
Tierra abrasada	Gustavo Siri	5 November	Documentary
Tokio	Maximiliano Gutiérrez	21 May	Comedy Romance
Tras la pantalla	Marcos Martínez	3 December	Documentary
Truman	Cesc Gay	24 September	Comedy/Drama
Tuya	Edgardo González Amer	2 April	Drama
U - Z
El último pasajero (la verdadera historia)	Mathieu Orcel	30 April	Documentary
Una canción coreana	Gustavo Tarrío y Yael Tujsnaider	25 June	Musical/Documentary
Un importante preestreno	Santiago Calori	18 September	Documentary
Uno mismo	Gabriel Arregui	17 September	Comedy
Un tango más	German Kral	10 December	Documentary
La utilidad de un revistero	Adriano Salgado	27 August	Drama
Valdense	Marcel Gonnet Wainmayer	3 December	Documentary
El vals de los inútiles	Edison Cájas	29 January	Documentary
Verguenza y respeto	Tomás Lipgot	1 October	Documentary
La vida después	Pablo Bardauil	7 May	Drama
Voley	Martin Piroyansky	12 March	Comedy
Walsh entre todos	Carmen Guarini	5 November	Documentary
Zonda, folclore argentino	Carlos Saura	28 May	Documentary
