= Tomás Fonzi =

Argentine actor (born 1981)

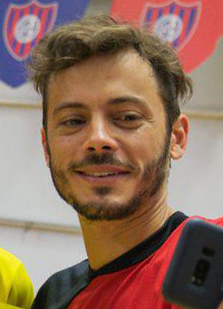
- Fonzi in 2019
- Born: Tomás Gonzalo Fonzi; 24 August 1981 (age 45); Buenos Aires, Argentina
- Occupation: Actor
- Years active: 1998–present
- Spouse: Leticia Lombardi (m. 2022)
- Children: 2
- Relatives: Dolores Fonzi (sister)

Tomás Gonzalo Fonzi (born 24 August 1981) is an Argentine actor. He is known for his work in television, theatre, and film, with notable roles in telenovelas and independent cinema. Fonzi has also appeared in stage productions and has been recognised for his versatility in both dramatic and comedic performances.

== Biography ==
Fonzi grew up in Adrogué, Partido de Almirante Brown, Buenos Aires. From 1997 to 1999, he studied acting under Raúl Serrano.

== Career ==
Fonzi began his acting career in the youth soap opera Verano del '98 on Telefe, where he played Benjamín Vázquez until 2000. He later appeared in Ilusiones, worked in radio on the programme Los Esparos del Ñorse, and made his debut as a singer alongside Alfredo Alcón. In 2000, he performed in the stage production La tempestad.

His first feature film was Una noche con Sabrina Love, directed by Alejandro Agresti, in which he portrayed a teenager who wins a raffle to spend a night with a popular adult film actress, played by Cecilia Roth. In 2002, he acted in the soap opera Franco Buenaventura, el profe, and the following year was one of the protagonists of the telecomedy Costumbres argentinas. He co-starred with Ricardo Darín and Cecilia Roth in the film Kamchatka.

In 2004, he joined the first season of Los Roldán, and later starred in the second season of Mosca & Smith with Fabián Vena. He also participated in the miniseries Soy tu fan. In 2006, he starred in Doble venganza alongside Gerardo Romano, Carolina Papaleo, and Marcela Kloosterboer, a role that earned him a nomination for a Martín Fierro Award. That same year, he appeared in the second season of Mujeres asesinas, opposite Romina Ricci, in the episode "Cecilia, hermana".

Between 2009 and 2010, Fonzi played Adrián "Anguila" Muñiz in Botineras and starred in the film Paco, for which he won the Best Actor award at the Festival Iberoamericano de Lérida and received a nomination for the Silver Condor Award for Breakthrough Actor. He subsequently appeared in two of Argentina’s highest-grossing films of the period and began working internationally with the Spanish youth comedy Slam. In Mexico, he collaborated with actor, director, and producer Santiago Ferrón, touring with his rock band Mono Tremendo, where he gained recognition from audiences in Mexico City.

In 2011, Fonzi made guest appearances in the series Un año para recordar, Los únicos, and Contra las cuerdas. The following year, he participated in the telecomedy Graduados. In 2013, he acted in the anthology series Historia clínica and Historias de diván, and later joined the casts of the daily dramas Taxxi, amores cruzados and Somos familia.

In 2014, he made his debut in musical theatre, starring in Un día Nico se fue with Marco Antonio Caponi. The following year, he returned to Pol-ka Producciones, playing Máximo Ortiz, the main antagonist in Esperanza mía, opposite Lali Espósito and Mariano Martínez on Canal 13.

== Personal life ==
Since 2004, Fonzi has been in a relationship with Leticia Lombardi, with whom he has two children. The couple married in 2022.

== Filmography ==
=== Television ===
Year	Title	Role	Channel
1998–2000	Verano del '98	Benjamín Vázquez	Telefe
2000–2001	Ilusiones	Lucas Marzzano Ortiz	Canal 13
2001	Tiempo final	Ruso	Telefe
2002	Franco Buenaventura, el profe	Diego Buenaventura	Telefe
2003	Costumbres argentinas	Gabriel Rosetti	Telefe
2004–2005	Los Roldán	Facundo Uriarte	Telefe
2004–2005	Mosca & Smith	Santiago Smith	Telefe
2006	Mujeres asesinas	Luis	Canal 13
2006	Soy tu fan	Diego García	Canal 9
2006	Doble venganza	Manuel Ferrer	Canal 9
2009	Fundación Huésped: Revelaciones	Mariano Pereira	Canal 13
2009–2010	Botineras	Adrián "Anguila" Muñiz	Telefe
2010	Contra las cuerdas	Agustín	TV Pública
2011	Los únicos	Joaquín Ferragut	Canal 13
2011	Un año para recordar	Iván Linares	Telefe
2012	Graduados	Miguel "Micky" Ribeiro	Telefe
2013	Historia clínica	Sebastián	Telefe
2013	Historias de diván	Darío	Telefe
2013–2014	Taxxi, amores cruzados	Luca Nicolás	Telefe
2014	Somos familia	Pedro Mancini	Telefe
2014	Viento Sur	Camilo Ludueña	América TV
2015	La casa del mar	Teo	DirecTV
2015–2016	Esperanza mía	Máximo Ortiz	Canal 13
2016	Loco por vos	Fernando	Telefe
2017	Fanny la fan	Luciano "El Tano" Ramos	Telefe
2018–2019	Mi hermano es un clon	Camilo Figueroa	Canal 13
2020	Inconvivencia	—	Telefe

=== Movies ===
Year	Movie	Role	Director
2000	Una noche con Sabrina Love	Mario Daniel Montero	Alejandro Agresti
2000	Nueve reinas	Federico	Fabián Bielinsky
2001	30/30	Forester	
2001	Kamchatka	Lucas	Marcelo Piñeyro
2003	Nadar solo	Tomás Forte	Ezequiel Acuña
2003	Slam	Fito	
2009	Cómplices del silencio	Carlos Gallo	Stefano Incerti
2009	Rodney	Martín	
2010	Paco	Francisco "Paco" Blanco	Diego Rafecas
2011	Cruzadas	Mánager	Diego Rafecas
2012	No te enamores de mí	Maxi	
2013	Olvidados	Antonio	Carlos Bolado
2015	Pájaros negros	Mr. White	Fercks Castellani

=== Theater ===
Year	Title	Role	Director
2001	La tempestad		
2005	Blanco sobre blanco		Alejandro Mateo, Alfredo Rosenbaum and Ita Scaramuzza
2006	Novia con tulipanes		Gonzalo Demaria
2011	Código de familia		Eva Halac
2013–2014	Un día Nico se fue		Ricky Pashkus
2014	La nota mágica		Ricky Pashkus
2015	Esperanza mía at Luna Park	Máximo Ortiz	
2016	Yiya, el musical		Ricky Pashkus
2016–2017	Abracadabra		Carlos Olivieri
2018–2019	Locos por Luisa	Franco	Carlos Olivieri
2019	Perfectos desconocidos		Guillermo Francella
2021	La fiesta de los chicos	Harry	Ricky Pashkus
2022	La verdad	Lorenzo	Ciro Zorzoli

=== Television programs ===
Year	Program	Channel	Notes
2021	Experimentores	Pakapaka	Host
2021	MasterChef Celebrity Argentina 3	Telefe	Participant

== Awards and nominations ==
Year	Award	Category	Work	Result
2001	Festival Iberoamericano de Lérida	Best Actor	Una noche con Sabrina Love	Winner
2001	Silver Condor Awards	Best New Actor	Una noche con Sabrina Love	Nominated
2007	Martín Fierro Awards	Best Actor in a Telenovela	Doble venganza	Nominated
2011	Silver Condor Awards	Best New Actor	Paco	Nominated
2017	VOS Awards	Best Featured Performance	Abracadabra	Winner
2017	Carlos Awards	Best Supporting Actor	Abracadabra	Nominated
