= Julieta Cardinali =

Argentine actress

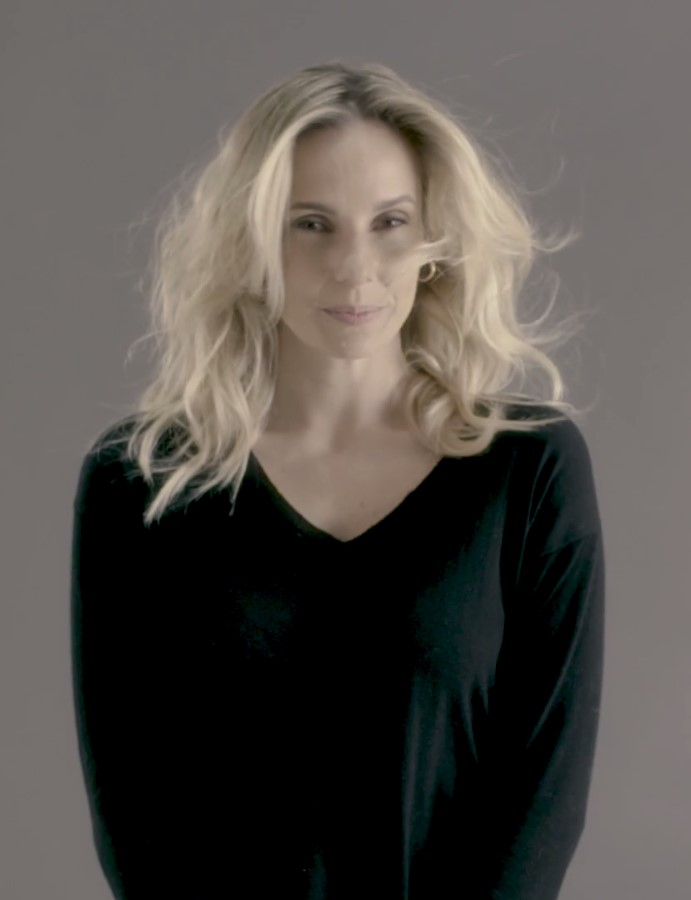
- Cardinali in 2017
- Born: October 21, 1977 (age 48); Buenos Aires, Argentina
- Occupation: Actress
- Years active: 1991-present
- Spouse: Andrés Calamaro (m. 2010; div. 2011)
- Partner(s): Alejandro Agresti (1999-2003); Andrés Ciro Martínez (2003-2005); Andrés Calamaro (2005-2010)
- Children: Charo Calamaro Cardinali (b. 2007)

Julieta Cardinali (born October 21, 1977) is an Argentine film and television actress.

== Career ==
Julieta Cardinali began her career in television as the first non-Brazilian Paquita at Argentinian version of the television show El show de Xuxa hosted by Xuxa. In 1995, she was part of the television program staff of Jugate con todo hosted by Cris Morena. In 1996, she was part of the cast of the television series Montaña rusa, otra vuelta. In 1997, she was part of the cast of the television series Sueltos. In 1997, she was part of the cast of the television series Como pan caliente. In 1997, she was part of the cast of the television series Naranja y media. In 1997, she was part of the cast of the television series Socios y más. In 1998, she was part of the cast of the television series Lo dijo papá. In 1998, she made her film debut, with the movie Buenos Aires me mata. From 1998 to 2000, she was part of the cast of the youth television series Verano del '98. In 2000, she acted in the movie Una noche con Sabrina Love. In 2001, she was part of the cast of the television series Los médicos de hoy. In 2001, she was part of the cast of the television series EnAmorArte. In 2001, she makes a small participation in the television series El Hacker 2001. In 2002, she was part of the cast of the television series Máximo corazón. In 2002, she was part of the cast of the television series Tiempo final. In 2002, she was part of the cast of the television series Maridos a domicilio. In 2002, she acted in the movie Valentín. In 2003, she was part of the cast of the television series Malandras. In 2003, she was part of the cast of the television series Disputas. In 2003, she acted in the movie El Nominado. In 2004, she was part of the cast of the television series Sangre fría. In 2004, she acted in the movie Un mundo menos peor. In 2005, she was part of the cast of the television series Numeral 15. In 2005, she acted in the movie Un Buda. In 2005, she acted in the movie La Suerte está echada. In 2006, she was part of the cast of the television series El tiempo no para. In 2006, she was part of the cast of the television series Soy tu fan. In 2007, she acted in the movie La Antena. In 2007, she acted in the movie ¿De quién es el portaligas?. In 2008, she acted in the movie 14, Fabian Road. In 2009, she was part of the cast of the television series Rosa, Violeta y Celeste. In 2009, she acted in the movie Tres deseos. In 2009, she acted in the movie El reclamo. In 2010, she was part of the cast of the television series Caín y Abel. In 2011, she was part of the cast of the television series Proyecto Aluvión. In 2012, she was part of the cast of the television series En terapia. In 2012, she acted in the movie Una cita, una fiesta y un gato negro. In 2013, she was part of the cast of the television series Farsantes. In 2013, she was the protagonist of the Spanish miniseries Carta a Eva. In 2013, she was part of the cast of the television series Lynch. In 2013, she acted in the movie Lectura según Justino. In 2014, she was part of the cast of the television series Señores Papis. In 2014, she acted in the movie Necrofobia. In 2014, she acted in the movie Los del suelo. In 2014, she acted in the movie El amor y otras historias. In 2015, she was part of the cast of the television series Viudas e hijos del Rock and Roll. In 2016, she was part of the cast of the television series Los ricos no piden permiso. In 2016, she was part of the cast of the television series Ultimátum. In 2016, she acted in the movie Ataúd blanco. In 2017, she acted in the movie Casi leyendas. In 2018, she was part of the cast of the television series Edha.

== Personal life ==
On July 23, 2010, she married Andrés Calamaro, whom was her boyfriend for 5 years. On January 9, 2007, she gave birth to the couple's first child, a girl, whom they called Charo Calamaro Cardinali. The couple divorced in 2011.

== Filmography ==
=== Television ===
Year	Title	Character	Channel
1991-1993	El Show de Xuxa	Paquita	Telefe
1996	Montaña rusa, otra vuelta	Coty	Canal 13
1997	Sueltos		Canal 13
1997	Como pan caliente	Melina	Canal 13
1997	Naranja y media	Andrea	Telefe
1997	Socios y más	Luciana	Canal 13
1998	Lo dijo papá		Canal 9
1998-2000	Verano del '98	Celina Villanueva	Telefe
2000	Los médicos de hoy	Noelia	Canal 13
2001	EnAmorArte	Alma Vigiano	Telefe
2001	El Hacker 2001		Telefe
2002	Máximo corazón	Carolina	Telefe
2002	Tiempo final		Telefe
2002	Maridos a domicilio	Micaela	Canal 9
2003	Malandras	Anita	Canal 9
2003	Disputas	Elena	Telefe
2004	Sangre fría	Backpacking	Telefe
2005	Numeral 15		Telefe
2006	El tiempo no para	Andrea	Canal 9
2006	Soy tu fan	Rocío	Canal 9
2009	Rosa, Violeta y Celeste		TV Pública
2010	Caín y Abel	Leonora Mendoza	Telefe
2011	Proyecto Aluvión	Delfina	Canal 9
2012	En terapia	Marina Generis	TV Pública
2013	Farsantes	Camila	Canal 13
2013	Carta a Eva	Eva Duarte	TVE
2013	Lynch	Simona Bianchi	Moviecity
2014	Sres. Papis	Magdalena Lynch	Telefe
2015	Viudas e hijos del Rock and Roll	Lola	Telefe
2016	Los ricos no piden permiso	Victoria Levingston	Canal 13
2016	Ultimátum	Verónica	TV Pública
2018	Edha	Bárbara	Netflix

=== Television Programs ===
Year	Program	Channel	Notes
1994	Sin vergüenza	TV Pública	Staff
1995	Mega Park	Telefe	Host
1995	Jugate con todo	Telefe	Staff

=== Movies ===
Year	Movie	Character	Director
1998	Buenos Aires me mata		Beda Docampo Feijóo
2000	Una noche con Sabrina Love	Sofía	Alejandro Agresti
2002	Valentín	Leticia	Alejandro Agresti
2003	The Chosen One	Catalina	Gabriel López & Nacho Argiró
2004	Un mundo menos peor	Sonia	
2005	Un buda	Sol	
2005	La suerte está echada	Clara	
2007	La Antena	Nurse	Esteban Sapir
2007	¿De quién es el portaligas?	Julieta	Fito Páez
2008	14, Fabian Road	Camila Ponte	Jaime de Armiñán
2009	Tres deseos	Ana	
2012	Una cita, una fiesta y un gato negro	Gabriela	Ana Halabe
2013	Lectura según Justino	Prof. Ula	
2014	Necrofobia	Beatriz	Daniel de la Vega
2014	Los del suelo	Marita	
2014	El amor y otras historias		
2016	Ataúd blanco	Virginia	Daniel de la Vega
2017	Casi leyendas	Ana	Gabriel Nesci
2025	Belén		Dolores Fonzi

=== Theater ===
Year	Title	Character
2004	Castas divas	
2007	Eva y Victoria	Eva Duarte
2018	Mientras tanto	

== Awards and nominations ==
Year	Award	Category	Work	Result
2001	Silver Condor Awards	Revelation Actress	Una noche con Sabrina Love	Nominated
2004	Silver Condor Awards	Best Supporting Actress	Valentín	Nominated
2012	Tato Awards	Best Actress in Daily Fiction	En terapia	Nominated
2013	Tato Awards	Best Leading Actress in Drama	Farsantes	Nominated
2016	Tato Awards	Best Leading Actress in Drama	Los ricos no piden permiso	Nominated
2017	Martín Fierro Awards	Best Leading Actress in Drama	Los ricos no piden permiso	Nominated
