= List of Argentine films of 1989 =

A list of films produced in Argentina in 1989:

== 1989 ==
Title	Director	Actors	Genre	Notability
1989
Apartment Zero	Martin Donovan	Hart Bochner, Colin Firth		
El Ausente	Rafael Filipelli	Ricardo Bertone, Verónica Castro, Alejandro Cuevas, Daniel Greco		
Bañeros II, la playa loca	Carlos Gellatini	Emilio Disi, Luis Cordara, Guillermo Francella, Monica Gonzaga, Gino Renni, Joe Rígoli		
Blue Eyed	Reinhard Hauff	Götz George, Miguel Ángel Solá		
Boda secreta	Alejandro Agresti	Floria Bloise, Mirta Busnelli, Tito Haas, Elio Marchi, Enrique Mazza	Drama	
Después de ayer	Hebert Posse Amorim	Enrique Liporace, María José Demare, Óscar Ferreiro, Constanza Maral, Mario Alarcón	Drama	
Desembarcos				
Cipayos (la tercera invasión)				
La Ciudad oculta				

Title	Director	Cast	Genre	Notes
Martín Fierro				
L' Isola alla deriva				
Pipo y los cazadores				
La Ofrenda	Lourdes Portillo			
El Escudo del cóndor				
Los Espíritus patrióticos				
Eversmile, New Jersey	Carlos Sorin	Daniel Day-Lewis, Gabriela Acher, Ignacio Quirós	Comedy-drama	
Los Extermineitors				
I Never Been in Vienna	Antonio Larreta			Entered into the 16th Moscow International Film Festival

== External links and references ==
- Argentine films of 1989 at the Internet Movie Database
