= Nicolás Pauls =

Argentine actor and musician (born 1973)

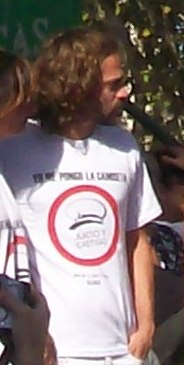
- Born: Nicolás Pauls; December 20, 1973 (age 52); Buenos Aires, Argentina
- Years active: 1996–present

Nicolás Pauls (born December 20, 1973) is an Argentine actor and musician. As the brother of actor Gastón Pauls, he made his breakthrough in the television series 90-60-90 modelos and in the film Buenos Aires Vice Versa in 1996, for which he earned Argentine Film Critics Association Awards for Best New Star nomination. He is a vegetarian and supports animal welfare organisations, publishing a video with Sinergia Animal against battery cages for egg laying hens in May 2019

== Filmography ==
=== Films ===
Year	Film	Director
1996	Buenos Aires viceversa	Dirección Alejandro Agresti
1997	Martín Hache	Dirección Adolfo Aristarain
1998	Buenos Aires me mata	Dirección Beda Docampo Feijóo
1998	Fuga de cerebros	Dirección Fernando Musa
1999	Nueces para el amor	Dirección Alberto Lecchi
2003	Vacas gordas	Dirección Giorgio Peretti
2003	Rojo	Dirección Lucía Cedrón
2003	La sombra de Jeniffer	Dirección Daniel de la Vega / Pablo Pares (EE.UU)
2003	Los esclavos felices	Dirección Gabriel Arbós
2003	Dolores de casada	Dirección Juan M. Giménez
2004	Hermanas	Dirección Julia Solomonoff (Arg.+ España + EE.UU)
2005	Tres minutos	Dirección Diego Lublinsky
2006	Miserias	Dirección César Albarracín
2006	El salto de Christian	Dirección Eduardo Calcagno
2007	Paisito	Dir. Ana Díez
2007	Amorosa soledad	Dir. Victoria Galardi y Martín Carranza
2008	Una cita, una fiesta y un gato negro	Dir. Ana Halabe
2013	Rouge amargo	Dir. Gustavo Cova
2014	Naturaleza muerta	Dir. Gabriel Grieco
2014	Amapola	Dir. Eugenio Zanetti
2015	Unidad nueve	Dir. Carlos Martínez
2019	El faldon	Dir. Gustavo Coopoletta
2019	Respira	Dir. Gabriel Grieco
2019	Hugo, Paco, Luis y tres chicas de rosa	Dir. Edmundo Rodríguez

== Television ==
Año	Televisión	Canal	Rol
1995	Hacete cargo	ATC	Conductor
1996–1997	90 60 90 modelos	Canal 9	Damián López Ocampo
1997–1998	Gasoleros	Canal 13	Sebastián
1998-2000/2007	Volver Rock	Volver	Conductor
2001	El Hacker 2001	Telefe	Nico
2002	Tiempo final	Telefe	Ep: "El segundo"
2002	Infieles	Telefe	Ep: "Lo mismo de siempre"
2003	Mujeres en rojo	Telefe	Ep: "Rojo pasión"
2003	Resistiré	Telefe	Hernán
2004	Sangre fría	Telefe	Nahuel
2004	Locas de amor	Canal 13	Claudio
2004–2005	Historias de sexo de gente común	Telefe	Andrés
2005	Conflictos en red	Telefe	Eps: "Amigos"/"Compromiso"
2006	Mujeres asesinas	Canal 13	Eps: "Lucía, memoriosa"/"Rosa, soltera"
2006	Soy tu fan	Canal 9	Gastón
2006	Sos mi vida	Canal 13	Eric
2006	Un cortado, historias de café	Canal 7	
2007	La ley del amor	Telefe	Matías
2007	Top Five	Discovery Travel & Living	Conductor
2008	Casi ángeles	Telefe	Salvador Quiroga Harms
2008	B&B: Bella y Bestia	Telefe	Él mismo
2008	Todos contra Juan	América TV	Productor de "La vida es un juego"
2008–2009	Elepé	Canal 7	Conductor
2009	Acompañantes	Telefe	Kende
2009	Valientes	Canal 13	Carlos
2009–2010	Ciega a citas	TV Pública	Matías Russo
2010	Alguien que me quiera	Canal 13	Gonzalo
2011	Historias de la primera vez	América TV	Ep: "La primera vez que fui padre"
2012	30 días juntos	Cosmopolitan TV	Julián
2012–2014	Vivo en Argentina	TV Pública	Conductor
2013	Inconsciente colectivo	TV Pública	Lic. Francisco Villegas
2014	Mis amigos de siempre	Canal 13	León
2015	El mal menor	Canal 7	Nicolás
2015–2016	Conflictos modernos	Canal 9	Marcelo / Martín
2016	Estocolmo	Netflix	Rodríguez
2017 – present	O11CE	Disney XD	Francisco Velázquez
2018 – present	La caída	TV Pública	
2018	Rizhoma Hotel	Telefe	
2019	O11CE	Disney XD	Francisco Velázquez

== Awards and nominations ==
Year	Award	Category	Project	Result
1996	Argentine Film Critics Association Awards	Best New Actor	Buenos Aires Vice Versa	Nominated
