= Cacería =

- Directed by: Ezio Massa
- Written by: Ezio Massa; Jorge Bechara
- Produced by: Marcelo Altmark
- Starring: Luis Luque; Claribel Medina; Juan Palomino; Matias Sansone; Carlos Leyes
- Cinematography: Mariano Cúneo; Ada Frontini
- Edited by: Luis César D'Angiolillo; Ezio Massa
- Music by: Mariano Nuñez West
- Distributed by: Maleto Films
- Release date: April 11, 2002
- Running time: 90 minutes
- Country: Argentina
- Language: Spanish

Cacería (English language: Man Hunt) is a 2002 Argentine action thriller film directed and written by Ezio Massa and Jorge Bechara, Starring Luis Luque, Claribel Medina, Juan Palomino and Carlos Leyes.

== Cast ==
- Luis Luque ... Daniel
- Claribel Medina ... Elisa
- Juan Palomino ... Lucas
- Matías Sansone ... Nicolás
- Carlos Leyes ... Miguel
- Fernando Díaz ... Coco
- Pochi Ducasse ... Voz Doña Clara
- Horacio Erman ... Father Guido
- Bernardo Forteza ... Carlos
- Carlos Galettini ... Beltrán
- Miguel Gallardo ... Cajide
- Sebastián García ... Gaby
- Miguel Gutiérrez ... Cajide
- Carlos Kaspar ... Gordo
- Gustavo Leyes ... Cabo Leyes
- Puky Maida ... Rodo
- Ezio Massa ... Arms Dealer
- Carmela Moreno ... Mecha
- Fabián Rendo ... Poli
- Carlos Roffé ... Micky
- Maria Roman de Caloni ... Miss Clara
- Golo Sid ... Antonio
