= Carlos Roffé =

Argentine actor

- Born: 1 August 1943; Buenos Aires, Argentina
- Died: 31 December 2005 (aged 62)

Carlos Roffé (1 August 1943 – 31 December 2005) was an Argentine film and television actor active between 1969 and 2005.

== Biography and career ==
Roffé was born in Buenos Aires. He worked in the cinema of Argentina. IN 1985 he appeared as himself in Bairoletto, la aventura de un rebelde. In the late 1980s and early 1990s he appeared in a number of films of Alejandro Agresti. In 1999 he appeared in the film Animalada. In 2002 he appeared in Valentín.

In his acting career he appeared in well over 30 films and as well as on TV, he died of a vascular problem in 2005 having that year playing a character in the TV Series Criminal.

== Filmography ==
- Criminal (2005) (mini) TV Series .... Juez
- Botines (2005) (mini) TV Series
- Un mundo menos peor (2004) .... Cholo
- Los Roldán (2004) TV Series (unknown episodes)
- Rehen TV (2004) (TV) .... Juez
- Mala sangre (2004) .... Arturo
- Infieles (2004) (TV) .... Marido
- Costumbres argentinas (2003) TV Series (unknown episodes)
- Cien pesos (2003)
- Tumberos (2002) (mini) TV Series .... Director cárcel
- Valentín (2002/I) .... Dr. Galaburri
- Cacería (2002) .... Micky
- 099 Central (2002) TV Series (uncredited) .... Inspector de policía
- Los Simuladores .... Director escuela (1 episode, 2002)
- Culpables (2001) (mini) TV Series
- Cuatro amigas (2001) (mini) TV Series
- Animalada (2001) .... Alberto
- Una noche con Sabrina Love (2000) .... Montero
- Plata quemada (2000) .... Nando
- Vulnerables (1999) TV Series .... (1999)
- Campeones de la vida (1999) TV Series .... Maeli
- Mala época (1998)
- El Viento se llevó lo qué (1998) .... Amalfi
- El Impostor (1997/I) .... Police Chief
- La cruz (1997) .... Pablo
- Un día para siempre (1997)
- Buenos Aires Vice Versa (1996) .... Service
- Eva Perón (1996) .... Solari
- Curva à la izquierda (1995)
- El Acto en cuestión (1994) .... Miguel Quiroga
- Boda secreta (1989) .... Merello
- El Amor es una mujer gorda (1987)
- Brigada explosiva contra los ninjas (1986) .... Profesor de Yoga
- Pobre mariposa (1986)
- Los Días de junio (1985)... aka Days in June (International: English title)
- Gente en Buenos Aires (1974)
- Mosaico (1970)... aka Vida de una modelo, La (Argentina)
- El Ejército (1969) .... Narrator
