= Silvina Bosco =

Argentine actress (1966–2019)

- Born: June 18, 1966; Buenos Aires, Argentina
- Died: April 30, 2019 (aged 52); Buenos Aires, Argentina
- Occupation: Actress

Silvina Bosco was an Argentine actress.

She worked in television in series including Chiquititas, and appeared in Argentine films including Buenos Aires me mata (1998), La Fuga, Animalada and The Notice of the Day (2001), and Apasionados in 2002.

In 2004 she appeared in the films: Conversaciones con mamá and Whisky Romeo Zulu.

== Death ==
On 30 April, 2019 she died after being hospitalized for cancer.

== Filmography ==
- El Hombre que ganó la razón (1986)
- El Censor (1995)
- La Sonámbula (1998)
- Buenos Aires me mata (1998)
- El Visitante (1999)
- Animalada (2001)
- Arregui, la noticia del día (2001)
- La Fuga (2001)
- Te besaré mañana (2001)
- Causa efecto (2001)
- El Transcurso de las cosas (2001)
- Apasionados (2002)
- Click (2003)
- Un Día en el paraíso (2003)
- Vivir Intentando (2003)
- Whisky Romeo Zulu (2004)
- Dolores de casada (2004)
- Conversaciones con mamá (2004)
- El Abrazo partido (2004)
- Esas noches de insomnio (2005)

== Television ==
- "Amigovios" (1995)
- "Último verano, El" (1996)
- "Milady, la historia continúa" (1997)
- "Susana Giménez" (1998)
- "Socios y más" (1998)
- "Desesperadas por el aire" (1998)
- "Chiquititas" (1995)
- "Poné a Francella" (2001)
- "Maridos a domicilio" (2002)
- "Kachorra" (2002)
- "Infieles" (2002) (mini)
- "Tres padres solteros" (2003)
- "Rebelde Way" (2003)
- "Abre tus ojos" (2003)
- "Floricienta" (2004)
- "Amor mío" (2006)
- "El Código Rodriguez" (2006)
