= Carolina Papaleo =

Argentine actress (born 1969)

Carolina Papaleo (born 19 January 1969) is an Argentine actress of theater, film and television. She is the daughter of the actress Irma Roy and the journalist Osvaldo Papaleo. From a very young age she wanted to be an actress like her mother. In 2013 she debuted as a television presenter on a Channel 9 program Secretos de novelas which reviews telenovelas. She is a fan of the genre and watches four episodes a week to be able to review them.

== Filmography ==
=== Films ===
- Después de ayer (1989)
- La amiga (1988)
- Misión comando (1989)
- Siempre es difícil volver a casa (1992)
- Perdido por perdido (1993)
- Besos en la frente (1996)
- El mundo contra mí (1996)
- La maestra normal (1996)
- El evangelio de las maravillas (1998)
- Tres veranos (1999)
- Ni tan lejos, ni tan cerca (2005)
- Chile 672 (2006)

=== Television ===
- Ficciones (1987)
- Pasiones (1988)
- Vínculos I, II, III (1988-1989-1990)
- Ella contra mí (1989)
- Una voz en el teléfono (1991)
- Zona de riesgo (1992)
- Esos que dicen amarse (1993)
- Cara bonita (1995)
- Alta comedia (1995)
- Por siempre mujercitas (1996)
- El signo (1997)
- Ricos y famosos (1998)
- Los buscas de siempre (2000)
- PH (2001)
- 1000 Millones (2002)
- Infieles (2003)
- Los Roldán (2004)
- Panadería de "Los Felipe" (2004)
- Amor en custodia (2005)
- Doble venganza (2006)
- La ley del amor (2007)
- Maltratadas (2011)
- Adictos (2011)
- Historias de corazón (chapter 1) (2013)
- Secretos de novelas (2013 - 2015)

== Live presentations ==
=== Radio ===
- Hora Pico (2011)
- Caro en Radio (2011 - 2012 - 2013)
- El ángel del Mediodia (2012)

=== Theater ===
- Noche de Reyes (1991)
- La dueña de la historia (2000 and 2003)
- Parecen Ángeles (2002)
- Cabaret Bijou (2004)
- 11… Código para ciegos (2004)
- El Pintor (2004-2005)
- El camino a la Meca (2005-2006–2007)
- Flores de Acero (2007-2008-2009)
- Closer (2009)
- Fortuna (2010)
- Pirañas (2010)
- Mujeres y botellas (2011)
- Yo Adivino el Parpadeo (2011-2012)
- Mi vida con él (2012)
- El organito (2013)
- Los hombres de la independencia (2013)
- Ser Mujer es Caro (2013)
- Sé infiel y no mires con quien (2014)
