= Rodrigo Noya =

Rodrigo Noya may refer to:

- Rodrigo Noya (footballer) (born 1990), Argentine footballer
- Rodrigo Noya (actor) (born 1993), Argentine actor
