= Picado =

Picado is a surname. Notable people with the name include:

- Angèle Picado (1934–1997), French sprinter
- Clodomiro Picado Twight (1887–1944), Costa Rican scientist who researched snake venom and development of antivenins
- Giannina Segnini Picado (born 1970), Costa Rican journalist who uncovered two political scandals
- Ignacio Trejos Picado (born 1928), Costa Rican prelate of the Catholic Church
- René Picado Michalski (1905–1956), Costa Rican politician, general, brother of president Teodoro Picado Michalski
- Sonia Picado Sotela (born 1936), Costa Rican jurist, politician and university professor
- Teodoro Picado Michalski (1900–1960), Costa Rican educator, lawyer, 30th President of Costa Rica

== See also ==
- Picado Fino, 1996 Argentine drama film
- Clodomiro Picado Research Institute, research center in Vázquez de Coronado, San José Province, Costa Rica
- Papel picado, traditional Mexican decorative craft made by cutting elaborate designs into sheets of tissue paper
- Jegley v. Picado, 349 Ark. 600, a case in which the sodomy law of the U.S. state of Arkansas was struck down
