= Absentee =

Absentee or The Absentee may refer to:

- Absentee (band), a British band
- The Absentee (novel), a novel by Maria Edgeworth, published in 1812 in Tales of Fashionable Life
- The Absentee (1915 film), an American silent film directed by Christy Cabanne
- The Absentee (1951 film), a Mexican film directed by Julio Bracho
- The Absentee (1989 film), an Argentine film
- Absentee (album), an album from Pitch Black Forecast

== See also ==
- Absenteeism
- Absentee ballot
- Absentee landlord
- Absentee Shawnee Tribe of Indians
- Present absentee
