= Alejandro Urdapilleta =

Uruguayan actor

- Born: 10 March 1954; Montevideo, Uruguay
- Died: 1 December 2013 (aged 59); Buenos Aires, Argentina
- Occupation: Actor
- Years active: 1989-2013

Alejandro Urdapilleta (10 March 1954 – 1 December 2013) was an Uruguayan actor. He appeared in more than twenty films from 1989 to 2013.

== Selected filmography ==
Year	Title	Role	Notes
1989	Kindergarten	Popcorn Seller	
2004	The Holy Girl	Freddy	
2006	La Antena	Mr. TV	
2010	Lo que el tiempo nos dejó		TV
