= José Luis Alfonzo =

Argentine film actor

José Luis Alfonzo (born 1969 in San Luis Province, Argentina) is an Argentinian film actor.

He works in the cinema of Argentina.

== Filmography ==
- De que estamos hechos (1987)
- Casas de fuego (1995) a.k.a. Houses of Fire
- Carlos Monzón, el segundo juicio (1996)
- Queréme así, piantao (1997) a.k.a. Astortango
- Cómplices (1998)
- Un Crisantemo Estalla en Cinco Esquinas (1998) a.k.a. A Crysanthemum Bursts in Cincoesquinas
- Secret of the Andes (1999)
- Los Días de la vida (2000)
- Campo de sangre (2001)
- Lugares comunes (2002) a.k.a. Common Ground
- Sin intervalo (2002)
- El Regreso (2003)
- Los Esclavos felices (la secta) (2004)
- Kidon (2005)
- Mañana (2005)
- Olga, Victoria Olga (2006)
- Chile 672 (2006)
