= Luis Luque =

Argentine actor

- Born: June 12, 1956 (age 68); Buenos Aires, Argentina
- Occupation: Actor

Luis Luque, born Luis Antonio Pedro Barattero (June 12, 1956), is an Argentine film and television actor. He has made over 40 appearances in film and television in Argentina since 1982, when he appeared in Aprender a vivir.

Many of his films have received critical acclaim, including Corazón iluminado (1996), Buenos Aires plateada, and Cacería (2002), in which he played the lead role of Daniel. In 2004 he appeared as himself in 18-j.

== Filmography ==
- El robo del siglo (2020)
- La mujer de al lado (2019)
- Despido procedente (2017)
- Tiempo muerto (2016)
- Gato negro (2014)
- Ley primera (2012)
- El gato desaparece (2011)
- Pájaros volando (2010)
- Juntos para siempre (2010)
- Mis días con Gloria (2010)
- Más adelante (short film, 2010)
- Paco (2010)
- Zenitram (2010) .... Javier Medrano
- Mujeres Asesinas (2006) Irma, la de los peces
- Mujeres Asesinas (2006) Felisa, desesperada
- Tiempo de Valientes (2005) .... Alfredo Díaz
- El buen destino (2005)
- "Botines" (2005) (mini) TV Series
- Mujeres Asesinas (2005) Sandra, la gestora
- Velocidad funda el olvido, La (2005)
- Vigilador, El (2004) (TV) .... Vigilador
- Veneno da Madrugada, O (2004) .... Aristóteles Messina
- "Epitafios" (2004) (mini) TV Series .... Comisario Jiménez
- "Deseo, El" (2004) TV Series .... Flauta
- Rehen TV (2004) (TV) .... Monroy, Jorge
- 24 hs en la city (2003) (TV)
- Ciudad del sol (2003) .... Tito
- Soy tu aventura (2003) .... Yaco
- "Los Simuladores" (1 episode, 2003)
- "Infieles" (2002) (mini) TV Series .... (episode "Mariposas")
- Cacería (2002) .... Daniel
- "099 Central" (2002) TV Series .... Franco Ledesma
- Un Día de suerte (2002/I) .... Hernando
- "Son amores" (2002) TV Series (uncredited)
- "Yago, pasión morena" (2001) TV Series .... Ramón (unknown episodes)
- Buenos Aires plateada (2000)
- "Tiempofinal" (2000) TV Series (unknown episodes)
- Ojos que no ven (2000)
- "Buscas de siempre, Los" (2000) TV Series .... Raúl Benavides (Manosanta)
- Venganza, La (1999)
- "Condena de Gabriel Doyle, La" (1998) TV Series .... Gabriel Doyle
- "El Garante" (1997) (mini) TV Series
- Corazón iluminado(1996)
- Carlos Monzón, el segundo juicio (1996) .... Médico cirujano
- "Como pan caliente" (1996) TV Series
- Más allá del límite (1995) .... Luis
- "¡Hola Papi!" (1995) TV Series .... Gabriel
- Despertar de pasiones (1994)
- Terraza, La (1992) .... Criminal
- "Primer amor" (1992) TV Series .... Braulio
- "Oro y el barro, El" (1992) TV Series
- "Antonella" (1991) TV Series .... Gastón Cornejo Mejía
- Buenos Aires háblame de amor" (1991) TV Series .... Ramón
- Malevo (1990) .... Mateo
- "Rebelde" (1989) TV Series .... Andrés
- Dueño del sol, El (1987)
- Vínculos (1987) (TV) .... Fabián
- "Claudia Morán" (1986) TV Series .... Raúl Linares
- Sucedió en el internado (1985) .... Javier
- Cuarteles de invierno (1984)
- "Lucía Bonelli" (1984) TV Series
- "Dos vidas y un destino" (1984) TV Series
- "Aprender a vivir" (1982) TV Series
