= Norberto Díaz =

Argentine actor

Norberto Díaz (March 1, 1952 in Buenos Aires – December 18, 2010), who was called Gallego by others in the entertainment industry, was an Argentine actor who played the villain in famous soap operas in his country, Argentina.

Diaz's film credits included The Lighthouse, Buenos Aires Plateada, No habrá más penas ni olvido, Mirtha, De Liniers a Estambul and Darse Cuenta. His soup operas credits included Son Amores, Celeste siempre Celeste, Yago, Collar de Esmeraldas, Perla Negra. Díaz was also a stage actor, he made his debut in Hedy Crilla's play Solo 80. During 2010 he played the role of Abraham in El Conventillo de la Paloma, Vaccarezza's play at Teatro Nacional Cervantes Norberto Díaz died in his sleep at his home on December 18, 2010, at the age of 58. He had recently suffered from stomach ailments.
