= 14, Fabian Road =

- Theatrical release poster
- Directed by: Jaime de Armiñán
- Screenplay by: Jaime de Armiñán; Eduardo de Armiñán
- Starring: Julieta Cardinali; Ana Torrent; Ángela Molina; Cuca Escribano; Omero Antonutti; Fele Martínez; Fátima Rincón; Fernando Guillén
- Cinematography: Kiko de la Rica
- Edited by: Renato Sanjuán
- Production company: Lula Cine Producción
- Release dates: 11 April 2008 (Málaga); 21 November 2008 (Spain)
- Country: Spain
- Language: Spanish

14, Fabian Road is a 2008 Spanish film directed by Jaime de Armiñán which stars Julieta Cardinali and Ana Torrent.

== Plot ==
The fiction follows Camila, an Argentine best-selling fiction author with a reported writer's block who is gently kidnapped by a purported fan (Vega) upon making a trip to Spain. Camila is thereby taken to an isolated hostal in Extremadura managed by Palmira so she can write a new novel. Rather than a fan, Vega turns out to be seeking revenge, whilst Camila, rather than a novelist, is a marketing façade to sell novels.

== Cast ==
- Julieta Cardinali as Camila Ponte
- Ana Torrent as Vega Galindo
- Ángela Molina as Palmira
- Cuca Escribano as Fernanda Segovia
- Omero Antonutti as Benson
- Fele Martínez as Enrique Gozalvo
- Fátima Rincón as Rafaelita
- Fernando Guillén as Gonzalo

== Production ==
The screenplay was co-written by Jaime de Armiñán and his son Eduardo. The film is a Lula Cine production and it had the participation of Telemadrid. It was shot in Extremadura, including Mérida.

== Release ==
14, Fabian Road premiered at the 11th Málaga Film Festival's official selection on 11 April 2008. It was theatrically released in Spain on 21 November 2008.

== Reception ==
Jonathan Holland of Variety assessed that the film "is, at its heart, gripping, but wobbly around the edges".

== Accolades ==
Year	Award	Category	Nominee(s)	Result	Ref.
2008	11th Málaga Film Festival	Jaime de Armiñán, Eduardo de Armiñán	Silver Biznaga for Best Original Screenplay	Won	

== See also ==
- List of Spanish films of 2008
