= A Chrysanthemum Bursts in Cincoesquinas =

1998 film directed by Daniel Burman

Un crisantemo estalla en cinco esquinas
- Theatrical release Poster
- Directed by: Daniel Burman
- Screenplay by: Daniel Burman
- Story by: Daniel Burman; Diego Dubcovsky
- Produced by: Diego Dubcovsky
- Starring: José Luis Alfonzo; Pastora Vega; Martin Kalwill
- Cinematography: Esteban Sapir
- Edited by: Verónica Chen
- Music by: Antonio Tarrago Ros
- Distributed by: BD Cine
- Release dates: 1 November 1998 (Germany); 7 May 1998 (Argentina)
- Running time: 83 minutes
- Countries: Argentina; Brazil; France; Spain
- Language: Spanish

Un crisantemo estalla en cinco esquinas (English: A Chrysanthemum Bursts in Cincoesquinas) is a 1998 Argentine, Brazilian, French, and Spanish comedy-drama film written and directed by Daniel Burman, in feature film debut. It was produced by Diego Dubcovsky. It stars José Luis Alfonzo, Pastora Vega and Martin Kalwill, among others.

Film critic Anthony Kaufman, writing for indieWIRE, said the film has been cited as the beginning of the "New Argentine Cinema" wave.

== Synopsis ==
The story takes place in South America at the turn of the 20th century. As a child, Erasmo was left with a nurse by his parents, who had to escape a waging civil war. Erasmo is now a grown man. He has lost his parents, and now his foster mother is brutally murdered. He seeks to avenge her death, and the culprit is the landowner and head of state, El Zancudo. Erasmo befriends a poor Jew named Saul, who is prepared to help him in his undertaking. Along the way, Erasmo finds allies, adversaries, love, and then Magdalena.

== Cast ==
- José Luis Alfonzo as Erasmo
- Pastora Vega as La Gallega
- Martin Kalwill as Saul
- Valentina Bassi as Magdalena
- Millie Stegman as La Boletera
- Walter Reyno as El Zancudo
- Roly Serrano as Cachao
- Ricardo Merkin as Doctor
- Aldo Romero as Lucio
- María Luisa Argüello as Elsa
- Sandra Ceballos as Mother
- Guadalupe Farías Gómez as Albina
- Antonio Tarragó Ross as Chamamecero

== Distribution ==
The film was first presented at the Berlin International Film Festival on February 11, 1998. It opened in Argentina on May 7, 1998. It screened at the Muestra de Cine Argentino en Medellín, Colombia.

== Awards ==
Wins

- Sochi International Film Festival, Sochi, Russia: FIPRESCI Prize, Daniel Burman.
