= Una noche con Sabrina Love =

- Theatrical release poster
- Directed by: Alejandro Agresti
- Written by: Alejandro Agresti; Story: Pedro Mairal
- Produced by: Producer: Pablo Bossi; Co-Producers: Thierry Forte; Sarah Halioua; Massimo Vigliar
- Starring: Cecilia Roth; Tomás Fonzi; Fabián Vena; Norma Aleandro
- Cinematography: Arnaldo Catinari
- Edited by: Stefan Kamp
- Music by: Paul M. van Brugge
- Production companies: Patagonik Film Group; DMVB Films; L.C.J Editions & Productions; Naya Films S.A. PHF Films S.L. Surf Film; ULM
- Distributed by: Buena Vista International (Argentina and Italy); Amanda Films S.L. (Spain); Mars Distribution (France)
- Release dates: 8 June 2000 (Argentina); 14 February 2001 (France); 22 June 2001 (Spain); 13 July 2001 (Italy)
- Running time: 100 minutes
- Countries: Argentina; Spain; Italy; France
- Language: Spanish

Una noche con Sabrina Love ("A Night with Sabrina Love") is a 2000 Spanish-language film written and directed by Alejandro Agresti and based on the Pedro Mairal novel. It stars Cecilia Roth as Sabrina Love and Tomás Fonzi.

The film was produced by Pablo Bossi, and co-produced by Thierry Forte, Sarah Halioua, and Massimo Vigliar.

== Synopsis ==
Daniel Montero (Tomás Fonzi) is seventeen years old and has a nightly ritual: watching the program of the hottest porn star of the moment. So, when he wins a contest to spend a night with Sabrina Love (Cecilia Roth), he feels like he's reached heaven itself. Sabrina awaits him at the television studio in Buenos Aires. Daniel embarks on his journey from Curuguazú, the small provincial town where he has lived with his grandmother ever since his parents died. His life there is marked by exasperating boredom, an unpleasant job at the town's meatpacking plant, and the periodic floods that cut him off from the rest of the world.

Daniel encounters a cast of characters who will help him mature through both wise and deceptive guidance: Carmelo, the nocturnal poet who frequents the city's bars; Enrique, Daniel's changed brother who remains unaware of their parents' deaths; Sofia, a woman who seduces him one Saturday night; and, of course, the enigmatic Sabrina Love, accompanied by her entourage of producers and colleagues from the porn film industry. Thanks to them, Daniel experiences the city, explores his sexuality, and encounters love in unexpected ways.

== Cast ==
- Cecilia Roth as Sabrina Love
- Tomás Fonzi as Daniel Montero
- Fabián Vena as Enrique
- Giancarlo Giannini as Leonardo
- Norma Aleandro as Julia
- Julieta Cardinali as Sofía
- Mario Paolucci as Carmelo
- Luis Margani as Camionero
- Sergio Agresti as Soldier 1
- Oscar Alegre as Carboni
- Damián Aquino as Hombres Bailanta
- Karina Berti as Secretary
- Jorge Bosicovich as Dancer
- Carlos Roffé as Montero

== Production ==
Asked about the bed scenes she has with 18-years-old Tomás Fonzi, Cecilia Roth said the young actor was very nervous before that, but "hilariously, after the sex scene we had, he was much more relaxed with me."

== Distribution ==
The film was first presented in Argentina on June 8, 2000.

Later the film was screened a few film festivals, including: the Miami Hispanic Film Festival, Miami, Florida; the Latin America Film Festival, Poland; and the Bergen International Film Festival, Norway; the Huelva Latin American Film Festival, Huelva, Spain; and the Lleida Latin-American Film Festival, Lleida, Spain.

== Awards ==
Wins

- Huelva Latin American Film Festival: Silver Colon; Best Actress, Cecilia Roth; Huelva, Spain; 2000.
- Lleida Latin-American Film Festival: Best Actor, Tomás Fonzi; Lleida, Spain; 2001.

Nominations

- Argentine Film Critics Association Awards: Silver Condor; Best Actress, Cecilia Roth; Best New Actor, Tomás Fonzi; Best New Actress, Julieta Cardinali; Best Adapted Screenplay, Alejandro Agresti; 2001.
