= Pablo Bardauil =

Argentine film director

- Born: December 23, 1963; Buenos Aires, Argentina
- Occupations: Actor, film director, screenwriter
- Years active: 1993–present
- Notable work: Chile 672
- Awards: Best Screenplay, Cine Ceará; Best Screenplay, Trieste Festival of Latin American Cinema

Pablo Bardauil (born December 23, 1963) is an Argentine film actor, director, and screenplay writer.

He was born in Buenos Aires and works in the cinema of Argentina. His directorial debut, Chile 672, earned him awards for Best Screenplay from the Cine Ceará (Brazil) and the Trieste Festival of Latin American Cinema (Italy).

== Filmography ==
=== Actor ===
- Perdido por perdido (1993)
- El Censor (1995) aka The Eyes of the Scissors
- El Fuego y el soñador (2005)
- Chile 672 (2006)

=== Director and writer ===
- Chile 672 (2006)
