= Paco (film) =

2009 film by Diego Rafecas

- Directed by: Diego Rafecas
- Written by: Diego Rafecas
- Produced by: Francisco Cañada; Juan Pablo Miller; Ricardo Parada; Leonardo Polesel
- Starring: Tomás Fonzi; Norma Aleandro; Luis Luque; Esther Goris; Romina Ricci; Sofía Gala Castiglione; Juan Palomino; María Socas
- Cinematography: Marcelo Iaccarino
- Edited by: Marcela Sáenz
- Release dates: October 25, 2009 (Valladolid International Film Festival); March 18, 2010 (Argentina)
- Running time: 128 minutes
- Country: Argentina
- Language: Spanish

Paco is a 2009 Argentine drama film, written and directed by Diego Rafecas. It was shot in Buenos Aires and South Africa.

== Synopsis ==
The movie revolves around the central character, Francisco Black, known as "Paco" (Tomás Fonzi), a college student who becomes entangled in the world of cocaine paste, a byproduct of cocaine commonly referred to as "paco." The son of a senator, Francisco falls in love with a cleaning worker. He delves into the dark underbelly of Buenos Aires in pursuit of his girlfriend, only to discover that she has committed suicide after succumbing to prostitution in exchange for drugs.

Consumed by a desire for vengeance, Francisco resorts to planting a bomb in the drug manufacturing facility, killing several innocent individuals. Accused of terrorism-related charges, his mother employs her connections to try to clear his name. However, she ultimately has no choice but to confine him to a detox clinic, where Francisco encounters a group of lost souls.

== Reviews ==
Variety has called the film «an emotive character-driven rehab drama with a strong ensemble cast».
