= Inés Molina =

Argentine film and television actress

Inés Molina is an Argentine film and television actress. Sometimes she is credited as Inés Molina Villafañe.

She works in the cinema of Argentina.

== Filmography ==
- Sur (1989) aka The South
- El Viaje (1993) aka The Journey
- Buenos Aires Vice Versa (1996)
- The Other (2007) aka El Otro

== Television ==
- Déjate querer (1995) TV Series aka Let Me Love You
