= A Buddha =

- Spanish: Un Buda
- Directed by: Diego Rafecas
- Written by: Diego Rafecas
- Produced by: Ricardo Parada
- Starring: Agustín Markert, Carolina Fal and Diego Rafecas
- Cinematography: Marcelo Iaccarino
- Edited by: Marcela Sáenz
- Music by: Pedro Aznar & Diego Vainer
- Release date: July 14, 2005
- Running time: 115 minutes
- Country: Argentina
- Language: Spanish

A Buddha (Spanish: Un Buda) is a 2005 Argentine film written and directed by Diego Rafecas, a Zen teacher in Argentina It features Agustín Markert, Carolina Fal and Diego Rafecas himself in the lead roles.

== Plot ==
Tomas and Rafael are two brothers orphaned as children when their parents were taken by the military during the military dictatorship (1976–1983) in Argentina. Tomas experiments with extreme ascetic spiritual practices affecting his life and environment. Rafael, the elder brother, is a professor of philosophy at the University of Buenos Aires. Detached and alone, he views his brother's doings skeptically, questioning his Buddhist revelations. As they struggle to reconcile their differences, Tomas journeys to a Zen monastery in the mountains of Cordoba to find a Master, followed by his girlfriend. As Rafael lands there their struggles with each other and the world around them take a dramatic turn as they're all brought together.

== Reception ==
The movie was praised by critics, with Javier Firpo of La Razón calling it “a restless exploration of spirituality in times of personal selfishness” and Caridad Martin of the Buddhist Door calling it “genuine Buddhist.”

== Cast ==
- Agustín Markert as Tomás
- Carolina Fal as Laura
- Diego Rafecas as Rafael
- Julieta Cardinali as Sol
- Tina Serrano as Lucy
- Vera Carnevale as Laila
- Nelly Prince as Lela
- Boy Olmi as Papá
- Paula Siero as Mamá
- Luis Ziembrowski as Rata
- Juan Manuel Tenuta as Juan
- Toshiro Yamauchi as Maestro
- Iván De Pineda as Carlos
- Paula Montero as Secretaría
- Fabián Bril as Claudio

== Awards ==
Wins

- Málaga Spanish Film Festival | 2005 | Silver Biznaga | Audience Award
- Washington DC Independent Film Festival | 2007 | Audience Award | Best Feature & Special Recognition | Cine Latino
- Wine Country Film Festival | 2006 |Best First Feature Film
