= Secret Wedding =

1989 film

- Directed by: Alejandro Agresti
- Written by: Alejandro Agresti
- Produced by: Kees Kasander; Juan Collini; Denis Wigman
- Cinematography: Alejandro Agresti
- Edited by: René Wiegmans
- Music by: Paul M. van Brugge
- Release date: 10 November 1989
- Running time: 90 minutes
- Countries: Argentina; Netherlands; Canada
- Language: Spanish

Secret Wedding (Spanish: Boda secreta) is a 1989 Spanish-language drama film directed by Alejandro Agresti. The film received the Golden Calf for Best Feature Film award at the 1989 Netherlands Film Festival. The film was initially screened exclusively in specific film clubs in Buenos Aires as part of retrospectives dedicated to the director. However, in June 2004, Secret Wedding was nationally broadcast for the first time on Canal 7.

Agresti frequently explores themes related to the Argentine dictatorship, which took place between March 1976 and December 1983, and the devastating social, political, and cultural consequences it had on the Argentine population. These themes are evident in his other works, such as Todos quieren ayudar a Ernesto (1991), where disappeared individuals reappear in long-distance phone calls, El viento se llevó lo que (1998), which depicts a peculiar town with intermittent communication due to censored films, and Buenos Aires Vice Versa (1994), where former torturers blend in as security personnel in shopping malls.

Secret Wedding is a co-production between Argentina, Canada, and the Netherlands, with Alejandro Agresti directing based on his own screenplay. It was released in Canada on August 18, 1989, but never had a commercial release in Argentina. The film stars Floria Bloise, Mirta Busnelli, Tito Haas, and Elio Marchi.

== Plot ==
The police detain a naked man who is wandering aimlessly outside the subway terminal in Buenos Aires. After taking him to the police station, it is discovered that there is no record of him for the past 12 years. The only memory he retains is of his girlfriend, whom he left in his hometown all those years ago. Upon his release, he decides to travel back to his hometown. To his astonishment, he discovers his girlfriend, Tota (Mirta Busnelli), who fails to recognize him and is grappling with severe emotional issues since losing contact with her boyfriend. In an attempt to be close to her, Fermín (Tito Haas) chooses to stay near her as a friend. As he unravels his own forgotten past, Fermín begins reliving the oppressive circumstances of the town, exacerbated by the political machinations of the local priest (Nathan Pinzón). Unbeknownst to him, Fermín becomes embroiled in a similar struggle against the forces that caused his disappearance in the 1970s.

== Cast ==
- Floria Bloise as Doña Patricia
- Mirta Busnelli as Tota
- Tito Haas as Fermín
- Elio Marchi as Leandro
- Enrique Morales
- Nathán Pinzón as Pastor
- Sergio Poves Campos as Pipi
- Carlos Roffé as Merello
- Ernesto Ciliberti
- Susana Cortínez
- Raul Santangelo
- Alfredo Noberasco
- Ernesto Arias
- Enrique Mazza as police officer
- Hugo Padula
- Ariel Chichizola
- Carlos Larrache
