= La cruz (film) =

1997 film

- Directed by: Alejandro Agresti
- Written by: Alejandro Agresti
- Produced by: Alejandro Agresti; Pascual Condito
- Starring: Norman Briski
- Cinematography: Mauricio Rubinstein
- Edited by: Alejandro Brodersohn
- Release date: 9 May 1997
- Running time: 90 minutes
- Country: Argentina
- Language: Spanish

La cruz is a 1997 Argentine drama film directed by Alejandro Agresti. It was screened in the Un Certain Regard section at the 1997 Cannes Film Festival.

== Cast ==
- Norman Briski - Alfredo
- Mirta Busnelli - Eloisa
- Carlos Roffé - Pablo
- Laura Melillo - Claudia
- Harry Havilio
- Silvana Silveri
- Sebastián Polonski
- Silvana Ramírez
- Pascual Condito
- Alejandro Agresti
