= The Notice of the Day =

2001 film by María Victoria Menis

- Spanish: Arregui, La Noticia del Día
- Directed by: María Victoria Menis
- Written by: Diana Iceruk; María Victoria Menis
- Produced by: Héctor Menis
- Cinematography: Marcelo Iaccarino
- Edited by: César Custodio; Miguel Pérez
- Music by: Sebastián Escofet; Chango Spaciuk
- Production company: Todo Cine S.A.
- Distributed by: Domain Entertainment; Distribution Company
- Release date: August 1, 2001 (Argentina)
- Running time: 103 minutes
- Country: Argentina
- Language: Spanish

Leopoldo Arregui (Enrique Pinti)

The Notice of the Day (Spanish: Arregui, La Noticia del Día) is a 2001 Argentine comedy-drama film directed and written by María Victoria Menis with Diana Iceruk. The film, which premiered on 2 August 2001 in Buenos Aires, stars Enrique Pinti and Carmen Maura. Maura was nominated for a Silver Condor Award for Best Actress in 2002 for her role in the film.

== Cast ==
- Enrique Pinti .... Leopoldo Arregui
- Carmen Maura .... Isabel
- Damián Dreyzik .... Gabi (as Damián Dreizik)
- Lucrecia Capello .... Silvia
- Daniel Casablanca .... Beto Arregui
- Alicia Mouxaut .... Perla
- Vanessa Weinberg .... Marta Arregui (as Vanesa Weinberg)
- Alicia Zanca .... Nurse
- Jorge Suárez .... Dr. Inchausti
- Claudia Lapacó .... Chantal
- Alberto Anchart
- Lisette García Orsu .... Salomé
- Marcelo Xicarte .... Ramírez
- Luis Ziembrowsky .... Médico (as Luis Ziembrowski)
- Silvina Bosco .... Norma
