= Enrique Pinti =

Argentine actor and comedian (1939–2022)

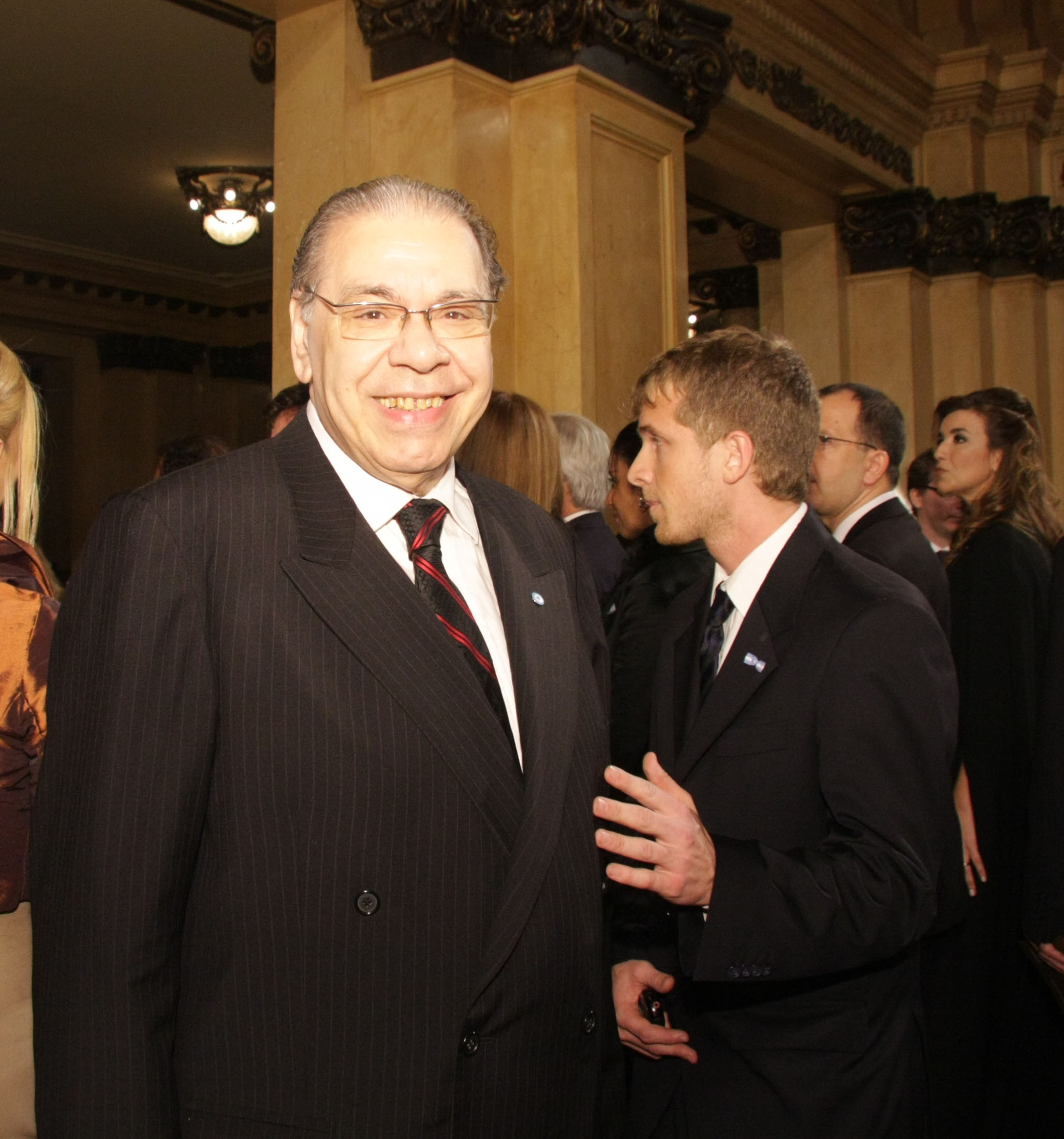
- Pinti in May 2010
- Born: 7 October 1939; Buenos Aires, Argentina
- Died: 27 March 2022 (aged 82); Buenos Aires, Argentina
- Occupation: Actor
- Years active: 1957–2022

Enrique Pinti (7 October 1939 – 27 March 2022) was an Argentine actor and comedian.

== Life ==
As a humorist, he performed stand-up shows with long monologues on Argentine politics and history, speaking at an extremely fast pace and resorting to a mix of common swearwords and elaborate insults to qualify notorious examples of immorality or corruption. The monologues were interrupted by interspersed musical segments. Though his stance was not impartial or unbiased, Pinti displayed historical knowledge beyond the common traditional themes, so these shows were arguably an alternative source of learning about Argentina's past and present troubles. A number of his productions, such as Salsa Criolla in the early 1990s and later Candombe Nacional, were among the most successful in the Argentine theatre.

Pinti starred in a number of Argentine films, in satirical as well as tragic roles. Some of the most notable were in Carlos Galettini's Juan que reía (1976), Alejandro Doria's Esperando la carroza (1985), Eduardo Mignogna's Flop (1990), Alberto Lecchi's Perdido por perdido (1993), Carlos Saura's Tango (1998), and in María Victoria Menis' Arregui, la noticia del día (2001).

Pinti was hospitalized on 5 March 2022 in Buenos Aires due to complications of diabetes. He died on 27 March 2022 at the age of 82. At the time of his death, he also had depression caused by the COVID-19 pandemic in Argentina.

== Theatre ==
- Pan y Circo
- Salsa Criolla
- Recuerdos del Futuro
- Circo Romano
- El infierno del Pinti
- Pericón.com.ar
- Candombe nacional
- Pingo Argentino
- Hairspray
- Antes de que me Olvide

== Filmography ==
- Waiting for the Hearse
- El Secuestrador at IMDb
- Triángulo de cuatro at IMDb
- Juan que reía at IMDb
- La nueva cigarra at IMDb
- Sentimental (requiem para un amigo)
- Tiro al aire at IMDb
- Tanguera at IMDb
- Flop at IMDb
- Perdido por perdido at IMDb
- Secretos compartidos at IMDb
- Diario para un cuento at IMDb
- Tango, no me dejes nunca (1998)
- La Cara del ángel (1998)
- Arregui, la noticia del día at IMDb
- Chúmbale at IMDb
- ...al fin, el mar at IMDb

== TV series ==
- Tiempofinal at IMDb
