= The Aerial =

2007 Argentine fantasy drama film by Esteban Sapir

- Theatrical release poster
- Spanish: La antena
- Directed by: Esteban Sapir
- Written by: Esteban Sapir
- Produced by: Federico Rotstein
- Starring: Valeria Bertuccelli; Alejandro Urdapilleta; Julieta Cardinali
- Cinematography: Cristian Cottet
- Edited by: Pablo Barbieri Carrera
- Music by: Leo Sujatovich
- Distributed by: Pachamama Cine
- Release dates: 24 January 2007 (IFFR); 19 April 2007 (Argentina)
- Running time: 90 minutes
- Country: Argentina
- Language: Spanish

The Aerial (Spanish: La antena) is a 2007 Argentine dystopian science fantasy film written and directed by Esteban Sapir. The film stars Valeria Bertuccelli, Alejandro Urdapilleta, Julieta Cardinali, with Rafael Ferro and Florencia Raggi in supporting roles.

== Plot ==
The movie begins with a pair of hands typing on a typewriter. The denizens of a nameless city "in the year XX" have lost their voices. People communicate by mouthing out words that are spelled mid-air. The only person who has kept the use of her voice is La Voz ("The Voice"), a singer working for the sole TV channel broadcast in the city, run by Mr. TV, who desires La Voz. La Voz wears a hood over her head that hides away her face. She has a son called Tomás, an eyeless little kid who also has a voice, which is kept secret. Tomás lives next door to Ana, whom he befriends after a letter addressed to his house is erroneously delivered to hers.

Ana's parents are estranged - her father works for Mr. TV as a TV repairman, and her mother is a nurse at a hospital. When Ana loses a "balloon man" owned by the channel, her father and grandfather are fired from the studio. Soon enough, Ana's father stumbles upon evidence that La Voz has been kidnapped, and, together with Mr. TV's vengeful son, they set out to spy on Mr. TV. Ana's father pays his ex-wife to let them into the hospital, where Mr. TV and his henchman Dr. Y (a scientist whose lower head has been replaced with a TV screen showing a mouth) subject La Voz to a series of experiments. They plan to use La Voz's unique power to finally subdue the denizens of the city. However, Dr. Y theorizes that a second voice might counter the effect of La Voz's. Mr. TV's outraged son comes out of hiding, is overpowered, and then put away, by his father's henchmen, whereas Ana's father manages to escape with the aid of his wife.

The reconciled couple manage to rescue Ana and Tomás from Mr. TV's henchmen, led by a masked, malformed man referred to as "the Rat Man", and meet with the grandfather. Since Mr. TV is going to broadcast La Voz's voice and thus subdue all citizens, they have to broadcast a second voice to counter the effect. The grandfather suggests using an old station, The Aerial, abandoned in the outskirts of the city, in the snowy mountains. Tomás, Ana and her parents don inflatable suits (equal to those donned by "balloon men") which send them floating up in the sky. Just as the grandfather finishes elevating them, the Rat Man and his henchmen arrive and shoot him. The family are then propelled away into the mountains.

Meanwhile, Mr. TV and Dr. Y initiate the broadcast during a boxing match. The citizens become hypnotized and subsequently fall asleep. Words then start oozing out of their bodies - the machine that sucked out their voice now takes their words out of them.

In The Aerial, the Rat Man and his henchmen storm into the station, stopping short Tomás' transmission. Ana's father and the Rat Man fight over a gun and stumble into a secret room in the station that reveals The Aerial's director, a young girl fitted inside a glass orb that oversees the production of the drugged food that keeps citizens under Mr. TV's control. The gun goes off and kills The Aerial's director, who turns into an old woman after dying, and Ana knocks down the Rat Man. Back at the lab, Tomás' transmission sends Dr. Y into a choking fit and is finished off by Mr. TV.

The transmissions counter each other and the citizens wake up, now able to use their voice, albeit without being able to speak. In the end, the family comes out of The Aerial, trying their new voices.

== Style ==
The film is shot entirely in black and white, visually reminiscent of technically degraded black and white films of the early 20th century. It is visually inspired by and includes references to the films of Fritz Lang (Metropolis), Georges Méliès (A Trip to the Moon), F. W. Murnau, Sergei Eisenstein; it has also been compared to the films of Guy Maddin.

== Cast ==
- Alejandro Urdapilleta as Mr. TV
- Rafael Ferro as The Inventor
- Florencia Raggi as The Voice
- Julieta Cardinali as Nurse
- Valeria Bertuccelli as Son of Mr. TV
- Ricardo Merkin as The Grandfather
- Sol Moreno as Ana
- Jonathan Sandor as Tomás
- Raúl Hochman as The Rat Man
- Carlos Piñeyro as Doctor Y

== Production ==
The movie's script consisted of a mere 60 pages and a story-board of over 3,000 shots that took 5 months to draw. Principal shooting took 11 weeks and the post-production took more than a year for completion.

== Exhibition ==
The film premièred at the Rotterdam Film Festival on 24 January 2007. It was the first time in 36 years that a film was chosen for both the official competition and opening of the Rotterdam Film Festival.

It was released to cinemas in the United Kingdom on 16 May 2008 by Dogwoof Pictures, with a DVD-Video release following on 18 August 2008.

== Critical reception ==
Film critics' reception was mixed. Among the positive reviews, one declared it "an amazing spectacle of sight and sound. [...] This was the most original film that I have seen since last year's Pan's Labyrinth.", but also added: "On a critical note, some viewers will be overwhelmed by the fast pace of the screenplay. Plus, with so many metaphors, one might have difficulty keeping up with what is actually going on." Another highly positive review said: "Reflexive, allegorical and poetic, La Antena is a dizzyingly dense piece of cinema, thriving on paradox, and always matching its medium to its message." An Argentinian review noted the film's narrative failures, but concluded that the film's stylistic achievements make up for the defects. In The Guardian, Peter Bradshaw wrote: "Sapir's movie-making awakened misgivings that I often have with Maddin: a feeling that this mock-silent genre is supercilious, and even faintly necrophiliac. The great works from the silent age were boldly modern, state-of-the-art adventures in technology and artistry, pushing at the limits of the possible. But this seems perverse, a coy homage that misunderstands the pioneering, forward-thinking spirit of the originals, who were far less self-conscious, and never appeared to solicit congratulations on how haunting or beautiful their films looked - although, admittedly, La Antena's imagery is often striking".

== Awards ==
Wins

- Clarin Entertainment Awards: Clarin Award, Best Film Director (Esteban Sapir); Best Original Film Music, (Leo Sujatovich); 2007.
- Argentinean Film Critics Association Awards: Best Director (Esteban Sapir); Best Editing (Pablo Barbieri Carrera); Best Sound (José Luis Díaz); 2008.
- A Night of Horror International Film Festival: Best Foreign Language Film; 2008.
- Fant-Asia Film Festival: Fantasia Ground-Breaker Award (third place); 2008.
