= Víctor Saldaño =

Argentine convicted murderer on death row in the U.S. (born 1972)

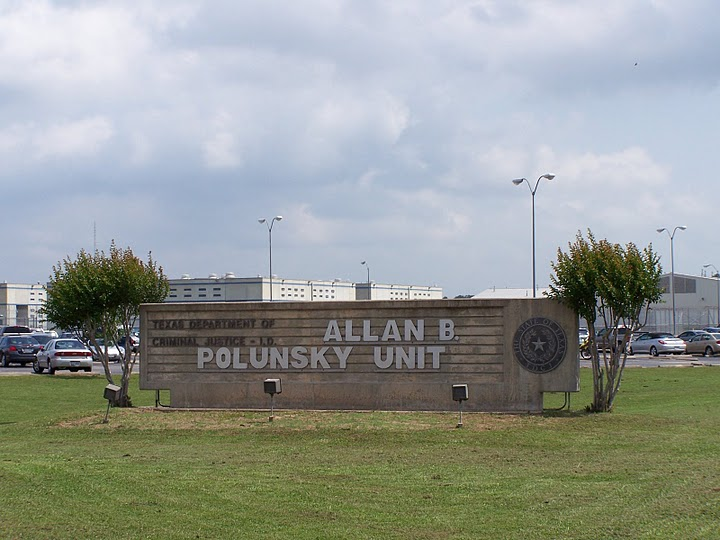
Polunsky Unit, where Saldaño is held

Víctor Hugo Saldaño (born October 22, 1972), aka Victor Rodriguez, is an Argentine man sentenced to death by the state of Texas. He is the sole Argentine sentenced to death in the United States.

Saldaño, from Córdoba, arrived to the United States in 1995, where he was an illegal immigrant and worked as a day laborer. He lived in New York City and later Dallas, where he was the roommate of a Mexican named Jorge Chávez.

On November 25, 1995, he and his co-defendant, Chávez, kidnapped Paul Ray King at a grocery store in Plano, Texas by using a gun to force him into a vehicle. At Lavon Lake, Saldaño killed King with five gunshots.

== Trial, sentencing, and imprisonment ==
He was tried in 1996 and found guilty. Psychologist Walter Quijano stated that Hispanics were more likely to commit crime and that the prison system had too many Hispanics during the portion of the trial in which his sentencing was determined. Saldaño received a death sentence while Chavez was sentenced to life imprisonment.

While on death row, Víctor Saldaño was originally held at the Ellis Unit. From 1999 to 2000, the death row for men was moved to the Polunsky Unit (formerly the Terrell Unit).

The Argentine government hired lawyers to overturn the sentencing on the grounds of Quijano's testimony. Southwestern Law School constitutional law professor Jonathan Miller stated "He is alive today because of the Argentine government."

He was retried and sentenced to death in 2004. Collin County assistant district attorney John R. Rolater Jr. stated that Saldaño pretended to have mental illness. Miller stated that the verdict was unjust since "They locked him in the pressure cooker of death row for seven years and then told everyone, `Look how dangerous he is.'"

Saldaño has since filed two writs of habeas corpus. In 2007, "he asserts that he was denied the effective assistance of counsel [...] by trial counsels' failure to preserve certain issues raised in his direct appeal." This claim was reviewed by the Court of Criminal Appeals of Texas and dismissed. In 2008, he "presents eight allegations in which he challenges the validity of his death sentence." This claim was also reviewed by the Court of Criminal Appeals of Texas, which partially concurred with only one of Saldaño's eight allegations, and thus upheld the death sentence.

In 2013 Lidia Guerrero, Saldaño's mother, mailed Pope Francis a letter asking him to help her son avoid execution. On March 20, 2015, and August 2, 2018, Pope Francis publicly announced his opposition to capital punishment in all cases.

== Legacy ==
Filmmaker Raúl Villaruel made the documentary Saldaño, el sueño dorado (Saldaño, The Golden Dream), about the case.

== See also ==
- List of death row inmates in the United States
- Argentina–United States relations
