= Valentín =

2002 film

- Theatrical release poster
- Directed by: Alejandro Agresti
- Written by: Alejandro Agresti
- Produced by: Laurens Geels
- Starring: Rodrigo Noya; Carmen Maura; Julieta Cardinali; Jean Pierre Noher; Mex Urtizberea
- Narrated by: Rodrigo Noya
- Cinematography: Jose Luis Cajaraville
- Edited by: Alejandro Brodersohn
- Music by: Luis Salinas; Paul M. van Brugge
- Production companies: First Floor Features; RWA
- Distributed by: Cinemien (Netherlands); Miramax Films (North America, Argentina)
- Release dates: 29 September 2002 (Netherlands); 12 March 2003 (Argentina)
- Running time: 86 minutes
- Countries: Netherlands; Argentina
- Language: Spanish

Valentín is a 2002 coming-of-age comedy-drama film written and directed by Alejandro Agresti. The film features Rodrigo Noya as Valentín and Carmen Maura as the grandmother. Director Alejandro Agresti also stars as Valentín's father.

The story revolves around the world of an eight-year-old boy, Valentín (Noya), who dreams of one day becoming an astronaut. While caught in the middle of his family, he attempts to better the bewildering world around him.

== Plot ==
The story takes place in 1969 and is told through the eyes of Valentín, an eight-year-old small, cross-eyed boy (Noya) whose thick black-rimmed glasses sit heavily on his face. He lives with his grandmother (Maura) due to the divorce of his parents. He dreams of being an astronaut one day and intently follows the ongoing space race between the U.S. and the Soviet Union. He no longer sees his Jewish mother, who was chased out of the family home by his imperious, dictator-like father (Agresti). He misses her badly but hardly remembers her. His anti-Semitic father only occasionally visits his mother and son, preferring to live the life of an Argentine playboy.

Valentín is friends with his uncle Chiche (Jean Pierre Noher) and the piano teacher Rufo who lives across the street (Mex Urtizberea). Both talk to Valentín as if he were an adult, and it seems Valentín is wise beyond his years. His uncle takes him to mass where a priest (Fabián Vena) talks about the death of an Argentinian doctor who was killed recently. He talks about Che Guevara as a man "who believed in an ideal, and who believed that injustice could be overcome. Please, don't leave here before you've asked yourselves, in all sincerity: Who of you would give, not his whole life, but a year or even just one day, for an ideal, the way that Che gave all he had?". Many in the audience walk out and Valentín comments: "But just like my uncle said, the priest couldn't change anything. Everything stayed the same".

Leticia (Julieta Cardinali), his father's latest romantic interest, pays a visit and both she and Valentin spend the day together going to the park, seeing a movie and sharing a meal. Valentín tells her personal things about his life and father. Due to Valentín's tales about his family, Leticia rethinks her relationship with his father and breaks up with him. His father is quite upset and blames Valentín.

One day Valentín realizes that his grandmother is ill but refuses to see a doctor. Valentín makes plans on how to get her to see Dr. Galaburri (Carlos Roffé). The plan he cooks up seems to work and she makes certain lifestyle changes. To thank the doctor, Valentín is thoughtful and buys a painting for Dr. Galaburri to display in his office. However, one day his grandmother dies when she goes to the hospital and Valentín goes to stay with one of his friends from school.

One day a thoughtful man visits Valentín and gives him a shirt that his mother sent for him. They have a conversation about his mother and Valentín begins to understand why his mother has stayed away for such a long time. The film ends as he sets up a blind date between Leticia and his piano teacher Rufo. They all have a meal together and Valentín tells us he decided to become a writer and that Leticia and Rufo lived happily ever after.

== Cast ==
- Rodrigo Noya as Valentín
- Carmen Maura as Grandmother
- Julieta Cardinali as Leticia
- Jean Pierre Noher as Uncle Chiche
- Mex Urtizberea as Rufo, the piano teacher
- Lorenzo Quinteros as a barman
- Alejandro Agresti as Father
- Carlos Roffé as Dr. Galaburri

== Development ==
In the DVD interview with director Alejandro Agresti, he said the film was based on one year of his childhood. Furthermore, Agresti stated he was motivated by what he perceived as the nature of kids. He made the case that kids have an ability to deal with life's difficulties and have a natural inclination to overcome obstacles out of sheer love and necessity, and not out of pride and fear.

== Reception ==
Valentín garnered mostly mixed reviews from film critics. On review aggregate website Rotten Tomatoes, the film holds an overall 61% "Fresh" approval rating based on 66 reviews, with a rating average of 6.1 out of 10. The site's consensus is: "A coming-of-age tale that's more cloying than affecting." At Metacritic, which assigns a weighted mean rating out of 0–100 reviews from film critics, the film has a rating score of 52 based on 29 reviews, classified as a mixed or average reviewed film.

Film critic Roger Ebert lauded the film and casting of the young boy as Valentín, writing, "I am not always sure what I mean when I praise a child actor, especially one as young as Rodrigo Noya. Certainly casting has a lot to do with his appeal; he looks the part and exudes a touching solemnity. But there is more. There's something about this kid, and the way he talks and listens and watches people, that is very convincing. Perhaps it helped that he was directed by a man who was once Valentin himself. The film is warm and intriguing, and he is the engine that pulls us through it. We care about what happens to him; high praise."

Critics Frederic and Mary Ann Brussat of the website Spirituality & Practice liked the film and wrote, "Written and directed by Alejandro Agresti, this remarkable drama takes us right into the yearning heart of a very smart and lonely young boy...The hopeful finale gives Valentin an opportunity to play matchmaker, something he finds much to his liking. This tender and heart-warming Argentinian film is a winner!"

The New York Times's Dave Kehr wrote, "[The film] has become all too familiar in the art houses: the cute child who awakens the cranky grown-ups around him to the infinite possibilities of life...[it] neglects few opportunities to pander to its public...[and] soon enough the bouncy pop score takes over again, and Valentín returns to its true business, tugging at well-worn heart strings."

== Distribution ==
The producers used the following tagline to market the film:

Cupid just turned eight.

The film was first presented at the Netherlands Film Festival on 29 September 2002. It opened in Argentina on 12 March 2003 at the Mar del Plata Film Festival, and opened wide in the country on 11 September 2003.

The film was shown at various film festivals, including: the International Film Festival Rotterdam, Netherlands; the Cinémas d'Amérique Latine de Toulouse, France; the Cannes Film Festival, France; the Seattle International Film Festival, USA; the Toronto International Film Festival, Canada; the London Film Festival, UK; and others.

Miramax Films acquired the North and Latin American distribution rights to the film, which opened on a limited basis in the United States on 7 May 2004.

=== Release dates ===
- France: 21 March 2002
- Italy: 16 April 2002
- Netherlands: 6 February 2002
- Spain: 4 April

== Awards ==
=== Wins ===
- Netherlands Film Festival: Golden Calf; Best Director of a Feature Film, Alejandro Agresti; 2002.
- Mar del Plata Film Festival: ACCA Jury - Special Mention Best Film; Special Jury Award; both for Alejandro Agresti; 2003.
- Newport International Film Festival: Audience Award, Best Feature, Alejandro Agresti; 2003.
- Oslo Films from the South Festival: Audience Award; Alejandro Agresti; 2003.
- Argentine Film Critics Association Awards: Silver Condor; Best Art Direction, Floris Vos; Best Director, Alejandro Agresti; Best Editing, Alejandro Brodersohn; Best Film; Best Music, Paul M. van Brugge; Best New Actor, Rodrigo Noya; Best Original Screenplay, Alejandro Agresti; 2004.
- Imagen Foundation Awards: Imagen Award, Best Picture; 2004.

=== Nominations ===
- Oulu International Children's Film Festival: Starboy Award, Alejandro Agresti; 2003.
- Argentine Film Critics Association Awards: Silver Condor; Best Cinematography, Jose Luis Cajaraville; Best Sound, Fernando Soldevila; Best Supporting Actor, Mex Urtizberea; Best Supporting Actress, Julieta Cardinali, Best Supporting Actress, Carmen Maura; 2004.
- Cartagena Film Festival: Golden India Catalina; Best Film, Aejandro Agresti; 2004.
- Young Artist Awards: Young Artist Award Best International Feature Film; 2004.
