= Rodrigo Noya (actor) =

Argentine actor (born 1993)

- Born: Rodrigo Noya; October 2, 1993 (age 32); Chascomús, Buenos Aires Province, Argentina
- Occupation: Actor
- Years active: 1999-present
- Awards: Silver Condor Awards Best New Actor

Rodrigo Noya (born 1993) is a former child actor from Argentina. He is best known for his starring role as Lorenzo Montero in an action series, Hermanos & Detectives.

== Biography ==
Noya made his film debut in Raúl Rodríguez Peila's Dibu 3. His additional film credits includes Alejandro Agresti's Todo el bien del mundo and notably Valentín, a film that gained international success.

== Filmography (selected) ==
- El hotel de los famosos (2022)
- Bailando 2019 (2019)
- El mural (2010)
- Hermanos y detectives (serie de televisión de España) (2007-2009)
- Hermanos y detectives (serie de televisión de Argentina) (TV Series) (2006)
- Un mundo menos peor (2004)
- El sueño de Valentín (Valentín) (2002)
- Dibu 3 (2002)
- Agrandadytos (1998)
