= Rafael Filippelli =

Argentine film director, producer and screenwriter (1938–2023)

- Born: 24 November 1938; Buenos Aires, Argentina
- Died: 22 March 2023 (aged 84); Buenos Aires, Argentina

Rafael Filippelli (24 November 1938 – 22 March 2023) was an Argentine film director, producer and screenwriter.

== Life and career ==
Born in Buenos Aires, Filippelli started working as assistant director in the mid-1950s, and in 1961 he directed his first short film, Porque hoy es sábado. A member of the group "Underground", together with, among others, Edgardo Cozarinsky, Néstor Lescovich, Miguel Bejo and Bebe Kamin, following the 1976 Argentine coup d'état he moved to exile in Mexico and later in Los Angeles. Returned to Argentina, in 1985 he made his feature film debut with Hay unos tipos abajo, which was followed by The Absentee, which entered the Moscow International Film Festival. In the 1990s, he directed a film trilogy dedicated to the city of Buenos Aires which mixed documentary and fiction. In 2007, he was awarded best director at the Buenos Aires International Festival of Independent Cinema for Música nocturna.

Filippelli was also a film critic and theorist, and served as professor of screenwriting at the Universidad del Cine from its foundation until his death. He died of complications from a minor surgery on 22 March 2023, at the age of 84. He was married to writer Beatriz Sarlo, with whom he often collaborated.
