= Buenos Aires plateada =

- Directed by: Luis Barone
- Written by: Luis Barone; Luis Alberto Asurey
- Produced by: Luis Barone
- Starring: Luis Luque; Mausi Martínez
- Cinematography: José Guerra; Esteban Sapir
- Edited by: Darío Arcella; Darío Tedesco
- Music by: Nicolás Posse
- Distributed by: Visionario
- Release date: 5 October 2000
- Running time: 74 minutes
- Country: Argentina
- Language: Spanish

Buenos Aires plateada (English language: Silver-Plated Buenos Aires) is a 2000 Argentine black-and-white film drama directed and written by Luis Barone with Luis Alberto Asurey.

The film premiered on October 5, 2000 in Buenos Aires.

== Plot ==
A television director has made the initial chapter of a TV series based on his own life history and wants to put it to the air. For it he looks for the support of two old friends, with whom he once a politician and held an important position in the government in the past.

But they have other stronger commitments and the program pilot does not excite them. He then puts then in scene a history where nothing is what it seems.

=== Cast ===
- Luis Luque
- Mausi Martínez
- Rubén Stella
- Norberto Díaz
- Manuel Callau
- Alejandro Awada
- Ricardo Merkin
- Fabiana García Lago
- Carlos Perciavalle
- Fernando Siro
- Luis Ziembrowsky
