= The Absentee (1989 film) =

- Directed by: Rafael Filippelli
- Written by: Rafael Filippelli
- Produced by: Rafael Filippelli
- Starring: Verónica Castro
- Cinematography: Andrés Silvart
- Edited by: Diego Gutierrez
- Music by: Jorge Candia
- Release date: 1989
- Running time: 85 minute
- Country: Argentina
- Language: Spanish

The Absentee (Spanish: El ausente) is a 1989 Argentine film directed and written by Rafael Filippelli. The film starred Verónica Castro, Daniel Greco and Ana María Mazza.

== Plot ==
The story chronicles the hardships and ultimate demise of Raúl Salas, a progressive labor union leader, and his companion Muñoz, an intellectual, in the city of Córdoba. Taking place between 1973 and 1976, the narrative unfolds against the backdrop of Argentina's transition from dictatorship to democracy following the election of President Héctor J. Cámpora. However, their hopes for a better future are shattered when a military coup takes place, resulting in the oppressive regime known as the National Reorganization Process, which lasted from 1976 to 1983.

== Cast ==
- Ricardo Bertone
- Alejandro Cuevas
- Daniel Greco .... Lencinas
- Hugo Guzzo
- Miguel Angel Iriarte
- Ana María Mazza .... Elena
- Pepe Novoa
- Omar Rezk .... Raúl Salas
- Beatriz Sarlo
- Andrés Silvart
- Roberto Suter .... Muñiz
- Omar Viale .... Rios

== Release ==
The film premiered in 1989.
