= Saldaño, el sueño dorado =

- English: The Golden Dream
- Directed by: Raúl Viarruel
- Written by: Raúl Viarruel
- Release date: March 2014
- Running time: 72 minutes
- Country: Argentina
- Language: Spanish

Saldaño, el sueño dorado (Saldaño, The Golden Dream) is a 2014 documentary by Raúl Viarruel about Víctor Saldaño, an Argentine man on death row in Texas.

The film discusses the life of Saldaño, including his murder of a man and the resulting death sentence. Viarruel uses material from staff of the Ministry of Foreign Affairs and Worship and Saldaño's mother Lidia Guerrero; he was unable to acquire interview material from Saldaño himself.

Viarruel is a journalist at Radio Nacional de Córdoba. The filmmaker stated: "La película asume la certeza de lo que es y cómo funciona el sistema judicial norteamericano para alguien latinoamericano y pobre como Saldaño" (The film takes on the certainty of the judicial system in then United States and how it works for someone from Latin America and poor like Saldaño). He added that he wanted to obtain a better outcome for Saldaño, but not to exculpate him.

== Reception ==
Horacio Bilbao of Clarín wrote that the film was "Buena" (good).

Pablo Suárez of the Buenos Aires Herald gave a negative review, arguing that it was uninteresting.
