= Animal (2001 film) =

2001 film by Sergio Bizzio

Animalada
- Directed by: Sergio Bizzio
- Written by: Sergio Bizzio
- Starring: Carlos Roffé; Christina Banegas
- Release date: 2001
- Running time: 92 minute
- Country: Argentina
- Language: Spanish

Animalada (English: Animal) is a 2001 Argentine black comedy film directed and written by Sergio Bizzio.

== Main cast ==
- Carlos Roffé as Alberto
- Christina Banegas as Natalie
- Carolina Fal as Paula
- Walter Quiroz as Gaston
- José María Monje as Miranda

== Other cast ==
- Federico Martin Barros .... Bailarin 1
- Hilda Bernard .... Aristocrat Lady
- Sergio Boris .... Médico 2
- Silvina Bosco .... Empleada Agncia de Turismo
- Nicolás Brown .... Joven 2
- Osvaldo Burgos .... Jorge
- Horacio Embón .... Conductor
- Vilma Ferrán .... Mamá Familia
- Alejandro Fornasari .... Enfermero 1
- Facundo Galván .... Silveyra
- Alfredo Iglesias .... Director Psiquiátrico
- Roberto Jacoby .... Efermero 2
- Carlos Lanari .... Papa Familia
- Julio Marticorena .... Médico 1
- Julieta Ortega
- Francisco Peterson .... Bailarin 3
- Mariano Rey .... Bailarin 2
- Guillermo Soffiantini .... Policia 2
- Rafael Spregelburd .... Ramiro
- Paolo Taramasco .... Joven 1
- Antonio Ugo .... Policia

== Release ==
The film premiered in Argentina on 6 September 2001.
