= The Act in Question =

El acto en cuestión
- Directed by: Alejandro Agresti
- Written by: Alejandro Agresti
- Produced by: Annemiek van Gorp
- Starring: Carlos Roffé; Sergio Poves Campos
- Cinematography: Néstor Sanz
- Edited by: Stefan Kamp
- Music by: Toshio Nakagawa
- Release date: 1994
- Country: Argentina
- Language: Spanish

The Act in Question (Spanish: El acto en cuestión) is a 1994 Argentine film directed and written by Alejandro Agresti. The film starred Carlos Roffé and Sergio Poves Campos. The film was also released in the Netherlands and Portugal. It was screened in the Un Certain Regard section at the 1993 Cannes Film Festival.

This film was partially filmed at a castle in Oostakker near Ghent, Belgium, in 1992. The De Bruyn family, who owned the castle, played as observers in the movie.

== Summary ==
Miguel Quiroga resides in a tenement alongside his girlfriend Azucena and has developed a daily habit of pilfering diverse used books. However, his routine takes an unexpected turn when he stumbles upon a magic trick within one of the books—a trick that enables him to vanish both objects and, eventually, people. With newfound skills, Quiroga secures a representative and embarks on a successful journey throughout Europe, showcasing his mesmerizing trick to captivated audiences.

== Cast ==
- Carlos Roffé as Miguel Quiroga
- Sergio Poves Campos as Amilcar Liguori
- Lorenzo Quinteros as Rogelio
- Mirta Busnelli as Azusena
- Nathalie Alonso Casale as Sylvie
- Daniel Burzaco/Nestor Sanz as Natalio Ruiz
- Guido Lauwaert as Mute friend
