= Buenos Aires Vice Versa =

- Theatrical release poster
- Directed by: Alejandro Agresti
- Written by: Alejandro Agresti
- Produced by: Alejandro Agresti; Axel Harding
- Starring: Vera Fogwill; Nicolás Pauls; Fernán Mirás; Mirta Busnelli; Carlos Roffé; Mario Paolucci; Laura Melillo; Harry Havilio; Nazareno Casero; Carlos Galettini; Floria Bloise; Inés Molina
- Cinematography: Ramiro Civita
- Edited by: Alejandro Agresti; Alejandro Brodersohn
- Music by: Alejandro Agresti; Paul M. van Brugge
- Release dates: November 12, 1996 (Mar del Plata Film Festival); March 20, 1997 (Netherlands)
- Running time: 122 minutes
- Countries: Argentina; Netherlands
- Language: Spanish

Buenos Aires Vice Versa (Spanish: Buenos Aires viceversa) is a 1996 Argentine and Dutch dramatic film, written and directed by Alejandro Agresti. The film was produced by Alejandro Agresti and Axel Harding, and co-produced by Emjay Rechsteiner.

The picture deals with the alienation felt by the children who survived the Argentine military dictatorship of the 1970s.

== Plot ==
Opening Title Graphic:
As the film begins a message appears and reminds the audience that approximately 30,000 people died during the Dirty War due to the military dictatorship's reign during the late 1970s and early 1980s.

The story is then dedicated to the surviving children of the dictatorship's victims. Two such children, now adults, are the main characters. One, Daniela (Vera Fogwill), now has her degree in film and is having trouble finding work. She's hired by an older couple who are living in seclusion, to film Buenos Aires for them so they can see it again. So she goes out and documents the city. But her customers are upset, as they don't remember the Buenos Aires Daniela has filmed. She then shoots a reel of tourist-type shots in hopes of pleasing the couple. The other surviving child, Damián, played by Nicolás Pauls, works in a low-rent motel. He eventually discovers the truth about what his parents experienced during the dictatorship.

The story is largely episodic, blending together more than 6 different story lines.

== Cast ==
- Vera Fogwill as Daniela
- Nicolás Pauls as Damián
- Fernán Mirás as Mario
- Mirta Busnelli as Loca TV
- Carlos Roffé as Service
- Mario Paolucci as Amigo
- Laura Melillo as Ciega
- Harry Havilio as Tío
- Nazareno Casero as Bocha
- Carlos Galettini as Don Nicolás
- Floria Bloise as Doña Amalia
- Inés Molina as Chica

== Background ==
The film is based on the aftermath of the real political events that took place in Argentina after Jorge Rafael Videla's reactionary military junta assumed power on March 24, 1976. During the junta's rule: the parliament was suspended; unions, political parties and provincial governments were banned, and in what became known as the Dirty War, between 9,000 and 30,000 people who were considered left-wing "subversives" disappeared from society.

== Distribution ==
Color theatrical poster.

The film was first presented at the Mar del Plata Film Festival in November 1996. It opened wide in Argentina on September 18, 1997.

The film was screened at various film festivals, including: the 1996 Cannes Film Festival, France; the Contemporary Latin American Film Series at UCLA, Los Angeles; the Oslo Film Festival, Norway; the Havana Film Festival, Cuba; and others.

== Critical reception ==
Film critic Karen Jaehne praised the film, and wrote, "The film tells you enough about each character to evoke our sympathy and not enough to let us see any possible resolution of the dilemma of loneliness. It's an intelligent film that observes mannerisms and social behavior in a way that makes you nod and say, "Yes, that's how it is." It builds toward a very powerful ending that reminds us of many another urban disaster story, but the problem that has made Buenos Aires a metropolitan orphanage is undeniable. Buenos Aires - Vice Versa is a wise film - worth watching and will undoubtedly make it to a festival near you."

== Awards ==
Wins

- Mar del Plata Film Festival: Best Ibero-American Film, Alejandro Agresti; FIPRESCI Prize, Alejandro Agresti; OCIC Award - Honorable Mention, Alejandro Agresti; 1996.
- Havana Film Festival: Special Jury Prize, Alejandro Agresti; 1996.
- Argentine Film Critics Association Awards: Silver Condor; Best Editing, Alejandro Agresti, Alejandro Brodersohn; Best Film; Best New Actress, Vera Fogwill; Best Original Screenplay, Alejandro Agresti; 1998.

Nominations

- Netherlands Film Festival: Golden Calf, Best Director of a Feature Film, Alejandro Agresti; 1997.
- Argentine Film Critics Association Awards: Silver Condor, Best Director, Alejandro Agresti; Best New Acto, Nazareno Casero; Best New Actor), Nicolás Pauls; Best Supporting Actor, Carlos Roffé; Best Supporting Actress, Mirta Busnelli; 1998.
