= Chile 672 =

- Theatrical release poster
- Directed by: Pablo Bardauil; Franco Verdoia
- Written by: Pablo Bardauil
- Produced by: María José Fuentebuena
- Starring: José Luis Alfonzo; Hossana Ricón
- Cinematography: Victoria Panero; Pablo Ramos; Gustavo Rejan
- Edited by: Karina Krakoff; Elena Massa; Gonzalo Santiso
- Music by: Federico Travi
- Distributed by: Primer Plano Film Group S.A.
- Release date: November 30, 2006
- Running time: 103 minutes
- Country: Argentina
- Language: Spanish

Chile 672, also known as 672 Chile Street, is a 2006 Argentine film directed by Pablo Bardauil and Franco Verdoia, and written by Bardauil. The movie was partly funded by INCAA. The film is Pablo Bardauil and Franco Verdoia's first feature film.

== Plot ==
The setting of the story is San Telmo, one of the oldest barrios of Buenos Aires.

The film tells of the characters who live in a building on 672 Chile Street, they include:

- An afflicted driver Nelson Infanti (José Luis Alfonzo) who finds calmness in Macarena (Hossana Ricón) a young girl he takes to school each morning;
- An actress Malena Marlene (Maria Lorenzutti) who used to be famous and seeks to have a strong comeback in her profession;
- A devout and orphan young girl Silvia Locatti (Erica Rivas) who listens to moans that come from the next apartment;
- A liberal Italian Simona Innocenti (Patricia Camponovo) who has won the enmity of her neighbors who are collecting signatures so that she can be evicted from the building.

== Cast ==
- José Luis Alfonzo as Nelson Infanti
- Hossana Ricón as Macarena
- Maria Lorenzutti as Malena Marlene
- Lito Cruz as Carlos Márquez
- Érica Rivas as Silvia Locatti
- Patricia Camponovo as Simona Innocenti
- Oscar Alegre as Emir
- Gonzalo Arguimbau as Jorge
- Alejandro Bardauil as Vecino Asamblea
- Pablo Bardauil as Santiago
- Dora Baret as Madre Silvia
- Alejandra Bernasconi as Vecina Asamblea
- Héctor Bidonde as Padre Silva
- Carlos Bohm as Utilero
- Paulo Brunetti as Osmar
- Susana Bueno as Vedette
- Federico Busso as Assistante
- Vera Fogwill as Enfermera

== Background ==
The film took five years to finish. One of the problems directors Bardauil and Verdoia had was that they started filming before their financing package was complete.

The Argentine economy crashed right after they began to shoot in the early 2000s. Co-director Bardauil said, "Chile 672 was conceived before the country’s economic downfall. So, originally it wasn't our decision to refer to the crisis, rather it was its explosion which forced us to reformulate the story later on."

== Distribution ==
The picture was first presented at the Rome Film Festival, Italy on October 14, 2006.

The film opened in Argentina on November 30, 2006.

It has been screened at a few film festivals, including: the Latin American Film Festival, London; the International Film Festival, Goa, India; the International Film Festival Mannheim-Heidelberg, Germany; and others.

== Awards ==
Wins

- Trieste Festival of Latin-American Cinema: Jury Prize, Best Screenplay, Pablo Bardauil; 2006.
- Cine Ceará – National Cinema Festival: Feature Film Trophy, Best Screenplay, Pablo Bardauil; 2007
