= Carlos Leyes =

Argentine boxer

Personal information
- Nationality: Argentine
- Born: 12 August 1950 (age 74)

Sport
- Sport: Boxing

Carlos Leyes (born 12 August 1950) is an Argentine boxer. He competed in the men's light flyweight event at the 1972 Summer Olympics.
