= Perdido por perdido =

- Directed by: Alberto Lecchi
- Written by: Alberto Lecchi; Daniel Romañach
- Produced by: Carlos D'Arias; Cipe Fridman; Alberto Lecchi; Luis A. Sartor
- Starring: Ricardo Darín; Enrique Pinti; Carolina Papaleo
- Cinematography: Jose Luis García
- Edited by: Alejandro Alem
- Music by: Julian Vat
- Release date: 29 July 1993
- Running time: 93 min.
- Country: Argentina
- Language: Spanish

Perdido por perdido (English: Lost for Lost) is an Argentine 1993 thriller directed by Alberto Lecchi and starring Ricardo Darín, Enrique Pinti and Carolina Papaleo.

== Synopsis ==
Vidal (Darín) is about to be bankrupt, so he sets up a fake car robbery with a small-time mobster to collect insurance and split the money. But his perfect plan becomes entangled by his increasingly dangerous ties to the mob and the meddling of a rogue insurance investigator (Pinti), who eventually strikes a deal with Vidal and decides to team up with him and his wife (Papaleo) to bring down the mob and expose the corruption that links a high-ranking executive to the mafia.
