= Fine Powder =

1996 film

- Screenshot
- Directed by: Esteban Sapir
- Written by: Esteban Sapir
- Produced by: Esteban Sapir
- Starring: Belén Blanco; Marcela Guerty
- Cinematography: Ramiro Civita; Víctor González; Esteban Sapir
- Edited by: Marcelo Dujo; Miguel Martin
- Music by: Francisco Sicilia
- Distributed by: 5600 Films
- Release dates: December 1996 (Cuba); April 23, 1998 (Argentina)
- Running time: 80 minutes
- Country: Argentina
- Language: Spanish

Fine Powder (Spanish: Picado fino) is a 1996 Argentine drama film, written and directed by Esteban Sapir. The picture features Facundo Luengo, Belén Blanco, Marcela Guerty, among others.

== Plot ==
The film tells of Thomas (Facundo Luengo) a Jewish grown man who lives with his grandmother in the industrial section of a large Argentine city.

His life isn't going exactly as planned. Though he has impregnated his girlfriend Ana, he finds himself avoiding her because he has fallen in love with Alma, so he ignores Ana.

When he needs to make some money, he hooks up with a drug dealer, and this makes matters worse.

== Distribution ==
The film was first presented at the Havana Film Festival in Cuba in December 1996. It opened in Argentina on April 23, 1998.

== Cast ==
- Facundo Luengo as Tomás Caminos
- Belén Blanco as Ana
- Marcela Guerty as Alma
- Miguel Ángel Solá as Profesor de violín
- Juan Leyrado as Selector de personal
- Ana María Giunta as Selectora de personal
- Ricardo Merkin as Dealer
- Sandro Nunziatta as Padre
- Nora Zinski as Madre
- Laura Martín as Hermana
- Fanny Robman as Abuela
- Hernán Pérez as Novio
- Alicia Mariola as Maestra
- Alejandro Sisco as Policía
- Miguel Kukoski as Diariero
- Eulalio Segovia as Mozo

== Awards ==
Wins

- Havana Film Festival: FIPRESCI Prize - Special Mention, Esteban Sapir; 1996.

Nominations

- Molodist International Film Festival, Ukraine: Best Film Award; Best Full-Length Fiction Film, Esteban Sapir; 1997.
- Argentine Film Critics Association Awards: Silver Condor; Best Editing, Marcelo Dujo and Miguel Martin; Best First Film, Esteban Sapir; 1999.
