= Esteban Sapir =

Argentine director (born 1967)

Esteban Sapir (born June 6, 1967, in Buenos Aires) is an Argentine cinematographer, film director, and screenplay writer. In the 1990s he began directing commercials and music videos.

He is from a Jewish family, but is not a practicing Jew.

== Filmography ==
Directing

- Picado fino (1996) a.k.a. Fine Powder
- Shakira: Live and Off the Record (2004) (Video)
- La Antena (2007) a.k.a. The Aerial

Cinematography

- Noches áticas (1995)
- Rey muerto (1995)
- Picado fino (1996) a.k.a. Fine Powder
- La Vida según Muriel (1997) a.k.a. Life According to Muriel
- Prohibido (1997)
- Aluap (1997)
- Cohen vs. Rosi (1998)
- Un Crisantemo Estalla en Cinco Esquinas (1998) a.k.a. A Chrysanthemum Bursts in Cincoesquinas
- Río escondido (1999) a.k.a. Hidden River
- Buenos Aires plateada (2000)
- El Nadador inmóvil (2000)
- Tesoro mío (2000)
- La T.V. y yo (2002)
- La Antena (2007)

Camera Operator

- Esa maldita costilla (1999) a.k.a. The Damned Rib
- Un Crisantemo Estalla en Cinco Esquinas (1998) a.k.a. A Chrysanthemum Bursts in Cincoesquinas
- Prohibido (1997)
- Aluap (1997)
- La Ausencia (1995)
