= Diego Rafecas =

Argentine actor and director (1970–2017)

- Born: 3 May 1970; Buenos Aires, Argentina
- Died: 18 April 2017 (aged 46); Buenos Aires, Argentina
- Occupations: Actor and director
- Years active: 2001–2017

Diego Rafecas (Buenos Aires, 3 May 1970 – 18 April 2017) was an Argentine actor and director. known for Un Buda, a film that he directed and acted in.

== Early life ==
Diego Rafecas was born on May 3, 1970, in Buenos Aires, Argentina. He started studying acting with Cristina Banegas, a well-known Argentine actress, when he was 17. Two years later he debuted as an actor in a play One Aspect directed by Banegas and written by Griselda Gambaro.

Later he obtained a BA in Philosophy from the University of Buenos Aires. At the same time he also began to study the Zen practice with Stephane Kosen Thibaut, a Dharma heir of Japanese Master Deshimaru.

== Career ==
During his college years, he made his first short film, The Good Life, and kidnapped in digital format, co-directed with Paul Flehner, and began studying film directing with Eduardo Milewicz. Under his guidance, he wrote and directed Living in New York, a short film that won major awards at festivals around the country.

He died on 18 April 2017, aged 46, from an illness that had kept him hospitalised.

== Filmography ==
Director

- El secuestro (2001) (Short)
- La buena vida (2002)
- Vivir en Nueva York (2005)
- A Buddha (2005)
- Rodney (2008)
- Paco (2009)
- Cruzadas (2011)
- Ley Primera (2017)

Actor

- La buena vida (2002) (cortometraje)
- Se me rompió el pantalón (2003) (cortometraje)
- Vivir en Nueva York (2005)
- A Buddha (2005)
- Cartas (2006)
- Rodney (2008)
- Paco (2009)
- Cruzadas (2011)
- Ley Primera (2017)
