= Choele =

2015 Argentine film by Juan Pablo Sasiaín

- Directed by: Juan Sasiaín
- Starring: Leonardo Sbaraglia; Guadalupe Docampo; Lautaro Murra
- Release date: 2015
- Countries: Argentina; Venezuela
- Language: Spanish

Choele is a 2015 Argentine comedy-drama film written and directed by Juan Pablo Sasiaín. The film stars Leonardo Sbaraglia, Guadalupe Docampo and Lautaro Murray. The film made its theatrical release on 7 May of the same year.

== Plot ==
Raised with his father, but about to leave the small Patagonian town of Choele Choel to embark on a new destiny with his mother, Coco faces an intense season of changes. It is the entrance to adolescence, his father's new and attractive girlfriend enters the scene, who is so much older but still keeps him awake at night. More than one obstacle stands between him and his amorous fantasy.

== Production ==
Most of the film was shot on the island of Choele Choel, the main town located in the middle valley of the Rio Negro, in northern Patagonia, Argentina.

== Cast ==
- Leonardo Sbaraglia as Daniel
- Guadalupe Docampo as Kimey
- Lautaro Murray as Coco

== Awards and nominations ==
=== Sur Awards ===
The film received two nominations in the tenth edition of the Sur Awards held on 24 November 2015.

Year	Category	Nomination	Result
2015	Best newcomer	Lautaro Murray	Nominated
2015	Best original music	Gustavo Pomeranec	Nominated
