= Daniel Greco =

Swiss footballer (born 1979)

Personal information
- Date of birth: 11 July 1979 (age 47)
- Place of birth: Geneva (Switzerland)
- Height: 1.84 m (6 ft 0 in)
- Position: Forward

Youth career
- 1984-1995: Servette FC

Senior career*
Years	Team	Apps	(Gls)
1995–1998	Grasshopper Club	1	(0)
1998–1999	Étoile Carouge FC		
1999–2000	Stade Nyonnais		
2000–2001	SC Kriens	2	(0)
2001-2002	FC Aarau		
2002	FC Luzern		
2002	Carrarese Calcio	9	(0)
2003	FC Baden	11	(1)
2004	FC Bulle		
2005	FC Winterthur		
2006-2007	FC Bulle		
2007	FC Meyrin		
- * Club domestic league appearances and goals

Daniel Greco (born 11 July 1979) is a retired Swiss football striker.

Daniel Greco is a retired professional Swiss footballer who played the position of centre-forward for several clubs in Switzerland, in Italy, Carrarese Calcio C1 and was a striker for the Swiss National team U18 and U21, which was trained by the Swiss football legend Köbi Kuhn. The Italian Swiss Player forced to retire early from his football profession due to several major injuries during his football career.

== Career ==
As an active youth football player, he played his first Swiss Final championship with Servette FC vs Grasshopper Club Zürich, Category Junior C, in 1993. In 1994, he won the Swiss championship U-15, GEF and in 1995 the Swiss Champion Category B1, Fc Servette vs Fc Lugano.

Daniel Greco signed his first professional contract with Grasshoppers Club Zürich in 1996 for a period of 5 years. There, he made his debut, where he won the Swiss Championship and the Swiss Cup in 1996 with U21 and scored a total of 28 goals. Greco made his first appearance in the LNA league against Servette Fc in 1996. Further up, Greco got pitched with Grasshoppers for the UEFA Champions League against Ajax Amsterdam, AJ Auxerre and Rangers F.C.

As a Swiss National Football player, he played with U18 and U21 for the Euro Qualifiers with success. With the U21 Team, he scored a total of 6 goals in 8 matches.

Statistics show that Daniel Greco's scores were significant for the U21 Qualification Euro 2002. Overall, Greco's stats as in Étoile Carouge FC LNB, SC Kriens LNA-LNB, FC Bulle, FC Luzern and FC Baden show an outstanding performance.
