= Buenos Aires me mata =

1998 film

- Screenshot from the film
- Directed by: Beda Docampo Feijóo
- Written by: Beda Docampo Feijóo; Laura Ramos
- Produced by: Mario Faroni
- Starring: Imanol Arias
- Cinematography: Ricardo Rodríguez
- Edited by: Luis César D'Angiolillo
- Music by: Iván Wyszogrod
- Distributed by: Líder Films S.A.
- Release date: 13 August 1998
- Running time: 102 minutes
- Country: Argentina
- Language: Spanish

Buenos Aires me mata (English language:Buenos Aires Kills Me) is a 1998 Argentine musical film drama directed and written by Beda Docampo Feijóo. The film was premièred on 13 August 1998 in Buenos Aires. The film stars Imanol Arias portraying a drag queen.

== Cast ==
- Imanol Arias .... Condesa Pavlova
- Fernán Mirás......... Laureano
- Eleonora Wexler...... Piernitas
- Nancy Dupláa..... Arteche
- Claudio Tolcachir.... Gonza
- Leonardo Saggese.... Sixto
- Maximiliano Ghione
- Juan Pablo Ballinou
- Silvina Bosco
- Marta Betoldi
- Julieta Cardinali
- Victoria Manno
