= Alejandro Agresti =

Argentine director

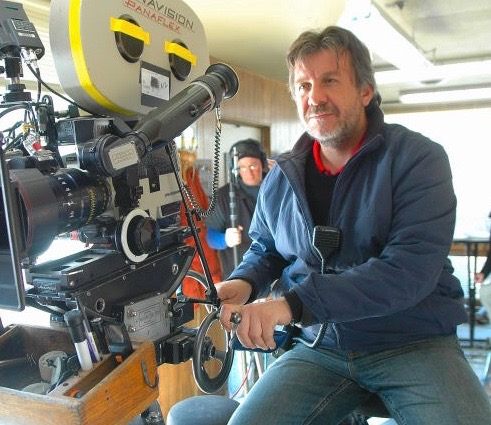
- Alejandro Agresti in 2004.
- Born: 2 June 1961 (age 65); Buenos Aires, Argentina
- Occupations: Film director Producer; Screenwriter

Alejandro Agresti (born June 2, 1961, in Buenos Aires) is an Argentine film director, writer and producer. A prominent filmmaker in his country, he also directed The Lake House with Hollywood actors Sandra Bullock and Keanu Reeves in 2006.

== Career ==
Agresti is best known in the United States for his feature Valentín, the story of a young boy who dreams of becoming an astronaut while attempting to better the bewildering world around him. This internationally acclaimed feature earned Agresti the Silver Condor (Cóndor de Plata) by the Argentine Film Critics Association for Best Director and Best Original Screenplay, Best Film and Special Jury Award at the Mar del Plata International Film Festival, the Golden Calf for Best Director at the Nederlands Film Festival, and the Audience Award at the Newport International Film Festival.

Agresti's other films include El viento se llevó lo que ("Wind with the Gone"), Un mundo menos peor ("A Less Bad World"), El acto en cuestion ("The Act in Question") and Buenos Aires Vice Versa. El Viento se llevó lo qué tells the story of a Buenos Aires cab driver who goes to an isolated village where the only contact with the outside world is through movies. The film garnered the Golden Seashell at the San Sebastián Film Festival, a Silver Hugo at the Chicago International Film Festival, two awards at the Havana Film Festival and a Golden Tulip at the Istanbul International Film Festival.

Agresti has also received several awards for his look at the urban makeup of his birthplace in Buenos Aires Vice Versa, including Best Screenplay and Best Editing from the Argentine Film Critics Association, the Special Jury Prize at the Havana Film Festival, and three awards from Argentina's Mar del Plata International Film Festival. Un mundo menos peor premiered at the 2004 Venice Film Festival and was awarded the "Award of the City of Rome" Best Film prize.

Born in 1961, Agresti made his directorial debut while still a teenager with 1978's El zoológico y el cementerio, a short film he shot on weekends while working as a TV director in Buenos Aires. Longing to broaden his horizons, he immigrated to the Netherlands, where he exhibited El hombre que ganó la razón at the International Film Festival of Rotterdam in 1986.

After establishing himself in the Netherlands, he continued his burgeoning career with such projects as Love is a Fat Woman which won the Special Jury Prize at the 1988 Nederlands Film Festival and the Best New Director award at the San Sebastian International Film Festival, and Secret Wedding which won the Golden Calf for Best Film award at the Nederlands Film Festival, among other international awards.

Other popular Agresti films include La cruz ("The Cross"), the story about a film critic whose job loss precipitates a family crisis; the popular comedy A Night With Sabrina Love, the tale of a teenager who unexpectedly wins an evening with a famous porn star in a television contest; City Life, Luba, Figaro Stories, Everybody Wants to Help Ernest, A Lonely Race, Modern Crimes, and El acto en cuestión ("The Act in Question"), which won more than a dozen international film awards.

In 2006, his film The Lake House was released and became a box office success, lending Agresti worldwide recognition.

He directed his first feature film in seven years, the comedy No somos animales (2013), which is a coproduction of Argentina and United States. The film stars John Cusack, who co-wrote the screenplay with Agresti. Paul Hipp co-stars, and Al Pacino is featured in a cameo. No somos animales was only shown in its workprint form in a few special projections at Argentina and the US; according to Agresti, a dispute between the film's producer and John Cusack (and Cusack's lawyer as well) has left the film in a limbo state, and it is still unclear when the theatrical cut will be released.

In 2016 he released Mecánica popular, an Argentine comedy-drama film he wrote and directed, starring Alejandro Awada and Patricio Contreras.

== Filmography ==
=== Director ===
- Mecánica popular (2016) / Popular Mechanics
- No somos animales (2013) / We Are Not Animals (originally titled Dictablanda; first showings in 2013, not officially released)
- The Lake House (2006)
- Un mundo menos peor (2004) / A Less Bad World
- Valentín (2002)
- Una noche con Sabrina Love (2000) / A Night with Sabrina Love
- El viento se llevó lo qué (1998) / Wind with the Gone
- La cruz (1997) / The Cross
- Un día para siempre (1997) / A Day For Ever
- Buenos Aires Vice Versa (1996)
- El acto en cuestión (1994) / The Act in Question
- Hexagon (1994) (segment Tegenbeweging, music composed by Theo Verbey)
- Modern Crimes (1992)
- A Lonely Race (1992)
- Everybody Wants to Help Ernest (1991)
- Figaro Stories (1991)
- Luba (1990)
- City Life (1990)
- Boda secreta (1989) / Secret Wedding
- El amor es una mujer gorda (1987) / Love Is a Fat Woman
- El hombre que ganó la razón (1986)
- La neutrónica explotó en Burzaco (1984)
- Los espectros de la recoleta (1981)
- Tú sabes mi nombre (1981)
- La araña (1980)
- Sola (1979)
- El zoológico y el cementerio (1978)

== Awards (selection) ==
- Best Director, Silver Condor (Cóndor de Plata), Argentine Film Critics Association
- Best Original Screenplay, Best Film and Special Jury Award at the Mar del Plata International Film Festival
- Best Director, Golden Calf, Nederlands Film Festival
- Best Film, Golden Calf, Nederlands Film Festival
- Special Jury Prize, Nederlands Film Festival
- Audience Award, Newport International Film Festival
- Golden Seashell, San Sebastián Film Festival
- Silver Hugo, Chicago International Film Festival
- Havana Film Festival
- Golden Tulip, Istanbul International Film Festival
