= List of Argentine films of 2000 =

A list of films produced in Argentina in 2000:

== 2000 ==
Title	Director	Actors	Genre	Notes
Acrobacias del corazón	María Teresa Constantini	Gabriel Goity	Romantic drama	Said to be based on Constantini's real life
Almejas y mejillones	Marcos Carnevale	Leticia Brédice	Comedy	Gross (est.) €1,332,890
Apariencias	Alberto Lecchi	Andrea Del Boca, Adrián Suar	Romantic comedy	Covers common marriage problems
El asadito	Gustavo Postiglione	Gerardo Dayub	Drama	Two Silver Condor Award Noms
Attack of the Killer Hog	Agustín Cavalieri	Gabriel Grieco	Horror	Released in Germany
Las aventuras de Dios	Eliseo Subiela	Daniel Freire	Fantasy	
Buenos Aires plateada	Luis Barone	Luis Luque	Drama	Shot in black and white
Botín de guerra	David Blaustein		Documentary	A documentary about Argentina's Dirty war
Cóndor Crux, la leyenda	José Luis Garci	Leticia Brédice	Adventure	Won a Silver Condor for best animated film
Nueve reinas	Fabián Bielinsky	Gastón Pauls, Ricardo Darín; L.Brédice	Crime film	
Que absurdo es haber crecido	Roly Santos	Gustavo Garzón, Leo Masliah; Victoria de Elizalde	Drama film	
Una noche con Sabrina Love	Alejandro Agresti	Cecilia Roth, Tomás Fonzi	Comedy	
Una Historia de tango	Hernán Vieytes	Ulises Dumont	Musical short	
Felicidades	Lucho Bender	Luis Machín, Gastón Pauls	Comedy	
Esperando al mesías	Daniel Burman	Héctor Alterio, Daniel Hendler, Imanol Arias	Comedy drama	Set in the Jewish community in Buenos Aires
Plan B	Jóhann Sigmarsson			
Plata quemada	Marcelo Piñeyro	Eduardo Noriega, Leonardo Sbaraglia, Pablo Echarri	Action thriller	
Same Love, Same Rain	Juan José Campanella			Entered into the 22nd Moscow International Film Festival

== See also ==
- 2000 in Argentina

== External links and references ==
- Argentine films of 2000 at the Internet Movie Database
