= The Aura (film) =

2005 film

- Theatrical release poster
- Spanish: El aura
- Directed by: Fabián Bielinsky
- Written by: Fabián Bielinsky
- Produced by: Ariel Saúl; Victor Hadida; Cecilia Bossi
- Starring: Ricardo Darín; Dolores Fonzi; Alejandro Awada; Pablo Cedrón; Jorge D'Elia; Manuel Rodal; Rafael Castejón; Walter Reyno; Nahuel Pérez Biscayart
- Cinematography: Checco Varese
- Edited by: Alejandro Carrillo Penovi; Fernando Pardo
- Music by: Lucio Godoy
- Production companies: Patagonik Film Group; Davis Films; Tornasol Films
- Distributed by: Buena Vista International (Latin America); Metropolitan Filmexport (France)
- Release dates: 15 September 2005 (Argentina); 21 October 2005 (Spain); 29 March 2006 (France)
- Running time: 129 minutes
- Countries: Argentina; France; Spain
- Language: Spanish
- Budget: US$2.8 million
- Box office: US$1.8 million

The Aura (Spanish: El aura) is a 2005 neo-noir psychological thriller film written and directed by Fabián Bielinsky and starring Ricardo Darín, Dolores Fonzi, Pablo Cedrón and Nahuel Pérez Biscayart. It was Bielinsky's second and final feature film before his death in 2006. The plot revolves around an epileptic taxidermist who often fantasizes about committing the perfect heist, and who suddenly has the chance of making one happen after he accidentally kills a man who was in fact a career criminal.

The Aura received mostly positive reviews from critics upon its release, particularly for its screenplay and ambience. It won the Silver Condor for Best Film and was the Argentine entry for Best Foreign Language Film at the 78th Academy Awards.

== Plot ==
After his wife leaves him, taxidermist Esteban Espinosa accepts an invitation to go hunting with his friend Sontag in a remote Patagonian forest. They stay at a cabin owned by Dietrich and run by his much younger wife Diana and her brother Julio. She lends Espinosa a rifle. While hunting, Sontag attempts to shoot a deer, but it is startled and escapes when Espinosa steps on a branch. Sontag realises Espinosa did it on purpose and returns to the cabin. Alone in the woods, Espinosa has an epileptic seizure. He awakens and attempts to shoot the deer himself, but accidentally kills Dietrich instead. Espinosa takes Dietrich's cellphone and returns to the cabin. Dietrich's dog smells him and recognises its owner's scent. At night, two men—Sosa and Montero—appear looking for Dietrich but leave after not finding him.

Through Dietrich's cellphone, Espinosa learns from a man named Vega of a heist to a factory. He heads to the factory and witnesses the failed heist. He follows Vega, who has been mortally wounded, and takes the key hanging around his neck after he dies. Espinosa opens Dietrich's hideout in the woods, where he finds plans of a heist that consists of stealing an armoured truck carrying the earnings of a nearby casino.

Sosa and Montero return and discover Espinosa has Dietrich's cellphone, so he pretends to be an accomplice of Dietrich's who learned about the heist plans before Dietrich escaped. At Dietrich's hideout, Espinosa finds documents that detail the truck's route and the larger sum of money that it will carry after a long weekend. Espinosa employs his eidetic memory to invent a plan for the heist. They decide to strike at the Eden, a bar–brothel where the guards always make a stop. Espinosa drives Diana to town and asks her about her relationship with Dietrich. She tells him Dietrich she tried leaving him before but he found her. Espinosa meets the criminals finish planning the heist. Before leaving for the robbery, Espinosa assures Diana that Dietrich will never return.

Urien, an accomplice inside the casino, tells Espinosa that Vega was supposed to take the place of an extra guard inside the back of the truck—which can only be opened from the inside—due to the larger sum of money. Espinosa tries to warn Sosa, Montero, and Julio—who are robbing the truck—but has a seizure. He awakens and gets to the Eden but fails to warn the team in time. A shooting takes place and Montero is wounded. Sosa kills two guards, while the third guard is locked inside the truck. Espinosa and the criminals drive with the truck to Dietrich's hideout, where there are tools to open the truck's lock. At Montero's command, Sosa kills Julio and tries to kill Espinosa, but runs out of bullets and takes him to the workshop to get more. Espinosa grabs a hidden gun and wounds Sosa, who runs away. Espinosa runs after Sosa through the forest and manages to kill him. Espinosa sees both Montero and the remaining guard locked in the truck have bled to death. He returns for Diana but finds she has left. Espinosa takes the dog with him and returns to his life as a taxidermist.

== Cast ==
- Ricardo Darín as Esteban Espinosa, the taxidermist
- Dolores Fonzi as Diana Dietrich
- Pablo Cedrón as Sosa
- Nahuel Pérez Biscayart as Julio
- Jorge D'Elía as Urien
- Alejandro Awada as Sontag
- Rafael Castejón as Vega
- Manuel Rodal as Carlos Dietrich, Diana's husband
- Walter Reyno as Montero

== Production ==
Writer and director Fabián Bielinsky had started writing the film in the 1980s, then-titled Un amigo del señor Dietrich (English: A Friend of Mr. Dietrich), which closely followed genre conventions and had a clear redemption arc for the protagonist. Bielinsky then took his original idea of "a guy wearing someone else's skin to satisfy his own desires" and took it in a different direction. During the writing process, Bielinsky offered Darín to take care of the character while he developed the story. Bielinsky would then take Darín's thoughts and sensations on the character and reproduce them in the script.

Bielinsky stated that The Aura was "a film almost reactive to Nine Queens". While Bielinsky shot Nine Queens in a way he would "disappear as director" and the writing would stand out, for The Aura he focused on other aspects of filmmaking such as "mood, lightning, or atmosphere". The film is told entirely from the protagonist's point of view, being present in every single scene of the film. Bielinsky had planned The Aura as part of a "conceptual trilogy", with each film focused on a different aspect of filmmaking. Nine Queens was the first installment, focused on mise-en-scène, The Aura was focused on point of view, and the third film would have been focused on editing.

Production designer Mercedes Alfonsín was the first crew member to join the project. She had eight weeks of pre-production by herself and regularly gave Bielinsky notes on the script as he was writing it. The casting process lasted six months. Ricardo Darín had already been cast as the protagonist, but the rest of the characters had no actors attached. According to casting director Eugenia Levin, the role of Montero, described as "a man in his sixties with respiratory issues and a mean face", was particularly difficult to cast. Uruguayan actor Walter Reyno was eventually chosen for the part.

The Aura began filming in mid-October 2004, taking place primarily in Bariloche and Buenos Aires City. In November 2004, shooting began at the Llao Llao Hotel in Bariloche, lasting around 40 days. In December, scenes were shot at the La Plata Museum with Darín and Awada. Filming concluded in late December 2004 in Buenos Aires.

The effect of the aura was achieved using a circular camera dolly with a linear camera dolly over it. The camera would spin with Darín on it in front of the camera, while the camara would dolly in while zooming out, so that the background would move farther away. The scenes where the protagonist experiences the aura consisted of alternating shots with symmetric and asymmetric framing in order to evoke a sense of unbalance and a "loss of volition".

In order to give the film a feeling of "unreality, alienation, where everything might be happening in a slightly out-of-kilter dimension", the film was converted to a digital intermediate, where the effect was achieved, and then converted back to film. The film's original cut had a runtime of three hours. The editing process took nine months. According to Bielinsky, "nothing essential" was cut, they only shortened the scenes already present in order to get to its final runtime.

== Release ==
The film opened wide in Argentina on 15 September 2005. It was theatrically released in Spain on 21 October 2005, whereas it opened in French theaters on 29 March 2006.

Many international companies bid to purchase the international sales rights to the film. French film distribution company Celluloid Dreams acquired the rights after the 55th Berlin International Film Festival in February 2005. Metropolitan Filmexport released the film in France and Alta Classic released it in Spain.

The Aura was screened at various film festivals, including the Cartagena Film Festival in Colombia, the Havana Film Festival in Cuba, the San Sebastián International Film Festival in Spain, the Sundance Film Festival and the Chicago International Film Festival in the United States, the Toulouse Latin America Film Festival in France, the Alba Regia International Film Festival in Hungary, the Transilvania International Film Festival in Romania, the Film by the Sea Film Festival in the Netherlands, and the Helsinki International Film Festival in Finland.

== Reception ==
=== Box office ===
On its first day, The Aura was screened in 51 theaters and had 14,551 spectators. In its opening weekend in Argentina, the film debuted at number one at the box office, with 123,137 spectators and grossing four times that of Blessed by Fire in second place. It was second-highest opening weekend of the year in Argentina, after Papá se volvió loco. The Aura remained in first place for its second weekend. By its third weekend, the film had accumulated 357,681 spectators and dropped only 6% from the previous weekend. By the end of January 2006, the film had over 620,000 viewers. The film grossed US$1.8 million in total.

=== Critical response ===
El aura garnered mostly positive reviews from film critics. On the review aggregator website Rotten Tomatoes, 88% of 48 critics' reviews are positive, with an average rating of 7.5/10. The website's consensus reads: "The Aura is a highly original and cerebral thriller that maintains its suspense from start to finish." Metacritic, which uses a weighted average, assigned the film a score of 78 out of 100, based on 19 critics, indicating "generally favorable" reviews.

Critic A.O. Scott, who writes for The New York Times, liked the way director Fabián Bielinsky used the neo-noir style, writing, "Mr. Bielinsky made use of a familiar film noir vocabulary, but not for the usual young-filmmaker-in-a-hurry purpose of showing off his facility with genre tricks. Rather, his movies restore some of the clammy, anxious atmosphere that made the old noirs so powerful to begin with." He also mentions the early death of director Bielinsky. He said, "For his part, Mr. Bielinsky, in what would sadly be his last film, demonstrates a mastery of the form that is downright scary."

Film critic Jonathan Holland, film critic for Variety magazine, liked the film and wrote, "An engrossing existential thriller from Fabien Bielinsky...Leisurely paced, studied, reticent and rural, The Aura is a quieter, richer and better-looking piece that handles its multiple manipulations with the maturity the earlier pic sometimes lacked...Featuring a career-best perf from Ricardo Darin, pic is a must-see in territories that warmed to Queens, while its superior production values could generate even bigger returns from international arthouse auds who enjoy their thrillers with a touch of distinction."

Film critic David Wiegand thought that director Bielinsky tackled a bit too much in this film and wrote, "Bielinsky's latest film, The Aura, is in some ways more ambitious, which may be one of the reasons it doesn't work as well as it should...the careful camera work, beautifully dark cinematography and the quietly nuanced performance by Darín keep our attention, but in the end, the film's bigger challenge isn't its length, or its deliberate pace: It's that it's overly freighted with symbolism and meaning."

=== Accolades ===
Award	Date of ceremony	Category	Recipient(s)	Result	Ref.
Cartagena Film Festival	10 March 2006	Best Director	Fabián Bielinsky	Won	
Clarín Awards	21 December 2005	Best Film	The Aura	Won	
Clarín Awards	21 December 2005	Best Director	Fabián Bielinsky	Won	
Clarín Awards	21 December 2005	Best Screenplay	Fabián Bielinsky	Nominated	
Clarín Awards	21 December 2005	Best Actor	Ricardo Darín	Won	
Clarín Awards	21 December 2005	Best Supporting Actor	Alejandro Awada	Won	
Clarín Awards	21 December 2005	Best Supporting Actor	Pablo Cedrón	Nominated	
Clarín Awards	21 December 2005	Best Male Newcomer	Nahuel Pérez Biscayart	Won	
Clarín Awards	21 December 2005	Best Cinematography	Checco Varese	Won	
Clarín Awards	21 December 2005	Best Music	Lucio Godoy	Won	
Havana Film Festival	19 December 2005	FIPRESCI Award	Fabián Bielinsky	Won	
San Sebastián International Film Festival	24 September 2005	Golden Shell	The Aura	Nominated	
Silver Condor Awards	26 June 2006	Best Film	The Aura	Won	
Silver Condor Awards	26 June 2006	Best Director	Fabián Bielinsky	Won	
Silver Condor Awards	26 June 2006	Best Original Screenplay	Fabián Bielinsky	Won	
Silver Condor Awards	26 June 2006	Best Actor	Ricardo Darín	Won	
Silver Condor Awards	26 June 2006	Best Supporting Actor	Pablo Cedrón	Nominated	
Silver Condor Awards	26 June 2006	Best Cinematography	Checo Varesse	Won	
Silver Condor Awards	26 June 2006	Best Art Direction	Mercedes Alfonsín	Nominated	
Silver Condor Awards	26 June 2006	Best Sound	Carlos Abbate and José Luis Díaz	Won	
Silver Condor Awards	26 June 2006	Best Music	Lucio Godoy	Nominated	
Silver Condor Awards	26 June 2006	Best Editing	Alejandro Carrillo Penovi and Fernando Pardo	Nominated	
Sundance Film Festival	29 January 2006	World Cinema Jury Prize: Dramatic	The Aura	Nominated	

== See also ==
- List of Argentine films of 2005
- List of Spanish films of 2005
- List of French films of 2006
