= El Viento (disambiguation) =

El Viento may refer to:

- El Viento, a 1991 video game for the Sega Genesis
- "El Viento," a song by Manu Chao from his 1998 album Clandestino
- El Viento (film), a 2005 Argentine film by Eduardo Mignogna
