= Pablo Cedrón =

Argentine actor

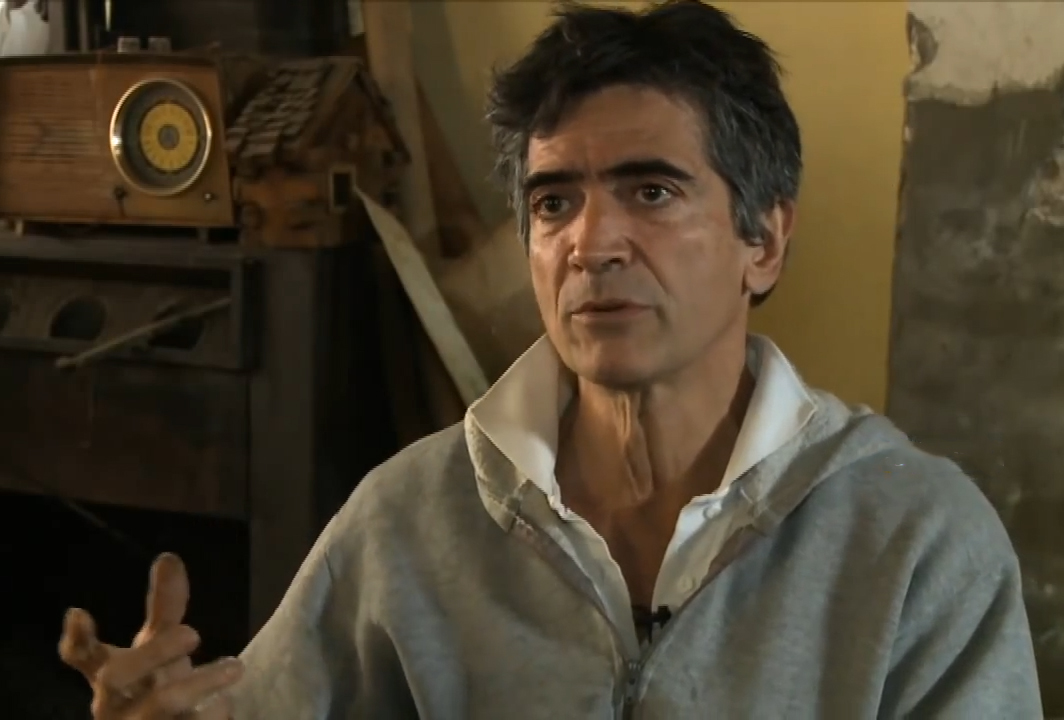
- Born: January 7, 1958; Mar del Plata, Argentina
- Died: November 1, 2017 (aged 59); Buenos Aires, Argentina
- Years active: 1971–2017

Pablo Cedrón (January 7, 1958 – November 1, 2017) was an Argentine actor.

In 2005, he starred in the El Viento.

In 2006, he prominently featured in some 58 episodes of the TV series Sos mi vida as Félix Perez Garmendia 'Falucho'.

== Filmography ==
- El Habilitado (1971)
- La Raulito (1975)
- Entre el amor y el poder (1984) TV Series
- El Juguete rabioso (1984)
- Las Barras bravas (1985) as Roberto
- Les Longs manteaux (1986) as Luis
- Pinocho (1986)
- Nico (1995) TV Series
- 90-60-90 modelos (1996) TV Series as Diego Nilson
- Río escondido (1999) as Luis
- Felicidades (2000) as Rodolfo
- Campeones de la vida (1999) TV Series as Chavero (1999–2000)
- Cabeza de tigre (2001) as French
- En ausencia (2002)
- Malandras (2003) TV Series
- Mujeres asesinas TV episode
- El Viento (2005) as Miguel Dufour
- El Aura (2005) .... Sosa
- Sin código (2005) (mini) TV Series as Carlos
- Bendita vida (2006) TV Series
- Sos mi vida as Félix Perez Garmendia 'Falucho' (58 episodes, 2006)
- Lalola (2007) TV Series as Teo
- The Appeared (2007)
- Agnus Dei (2008)
- Aballay, un hombre sin miedo (2010)
- Boca de Pozo (2014) as Lucho
