= The Forbidden Education =

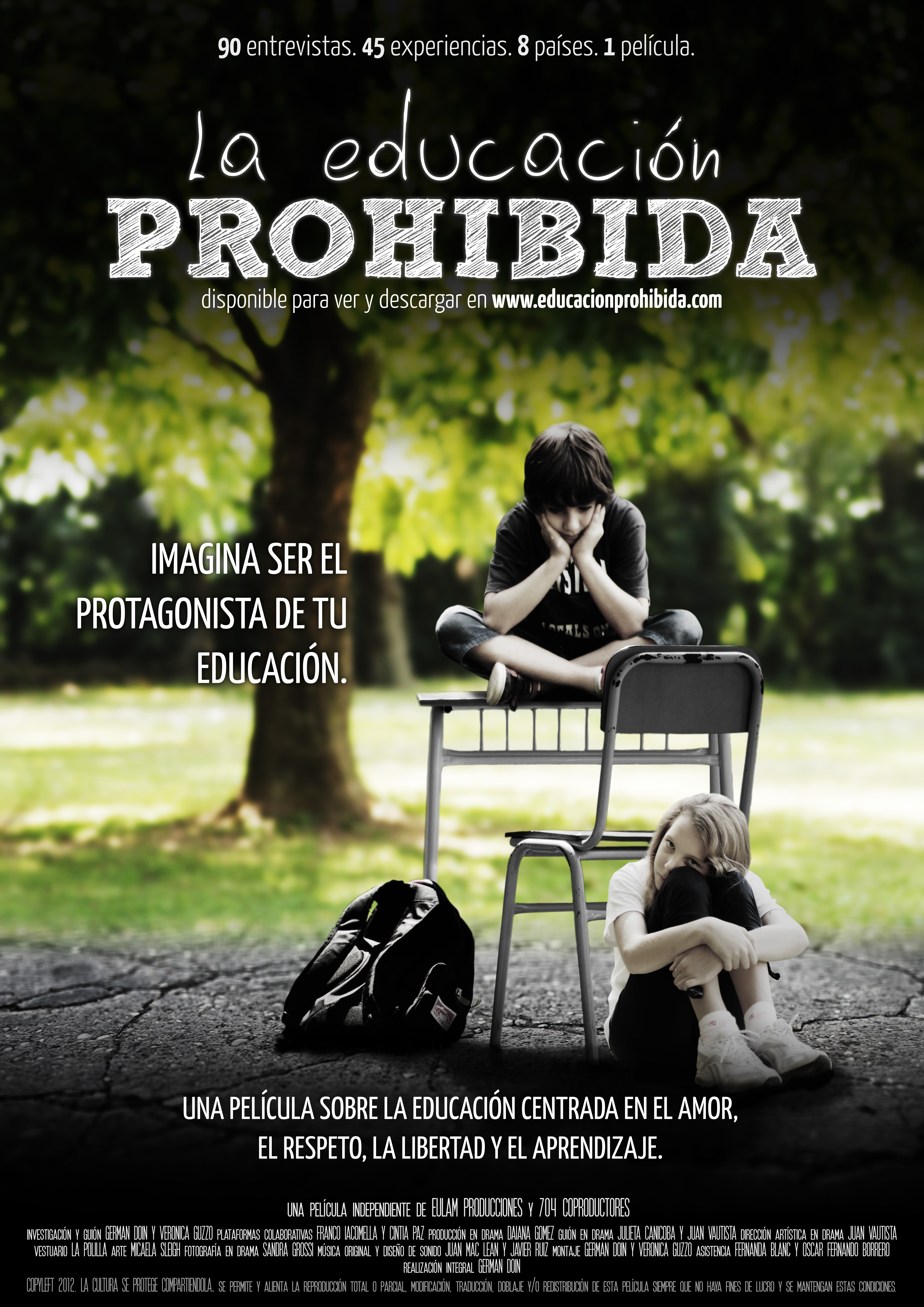
- Promotional poster
- Directed by: German Doin
- Written by: German Doin
- Produced by: Verónica Guzzo, Cintia Paz, Franco Iacomella
- Starring: Gastón Pauls
- Distributed by: Online distribution
- Release date: August 13, 2012
- Running time: 145 minutes
- Country: Argentina
- Language: Spanish

The Forbidden Education (Spanish: La Educación Prohibida) is an independent documentary released in 2012. The film documents diverse alternative education practices and unconventional schools in Latin America and Spain and includes educational approaches such as popular education, Montessori, progressive education, Waldorf, homeschooling.

It became the first released movie in Spanish to be funded under a crowdfunding methodology. It was also highlighted by its distributed screening proposal that enabled a synchronized release in 130 cities in 13 countries with a total number of 18,000 viewers in a single day. One week after its release, the movie was viewed almost 2 million times.

The film was released under the Creative Commons Attribution-NonCommercial-ShareAlike license.

== Content ==
The documentary is divided into 10 thematic episodes, each presenting a different aspect of education in the school context and outside of it. Topics include the history of the school system, authority and power in schools, evaluation and segregation of students, social function of educational institutions, and the role of teachers and families.

The film has almost 30 minutes of animation and a fictional dramatic story connecting the episodes.

== Festivals and exhibitions ==
The movie participated in the following festivals and exhibitions:

- 27.º Festival Internacional de Cine de Mar del Plata. Argentina. 2012.
- Festival Audiovisual CC de Medellín. Colombia. 2012.
- DOCTACINE - Muestra de cine documental de Córdoba. Argentina. 2012.
- 3.^{er} Festival de Cine Infantil y Juvenil de Bogotá. Colombia. 2013.
- Muestra de Cine Infantil de Florianópolis. Brasil. 2013.
- Festival de Cine Social de Concordia. Argentina. 2013.
- Festival de Cine Latinoamericano de Trieste. Italy. 2013.
- Festival de Cine Documental de Educación de Taipei CNEX. China. 2013.
- Festival de Cine Movida Conciencia Ya. Caracas, Venezuela. 2014.
- Ciranda de Filmes. São Paulo, Brasil. 2014.
- Viewster Online Film Fest. 2014.
- 8th International Children's Film Festival Bangladesh. 2015.
- OM Film Festival. Kansas, USA. 2015.
