= Deadly Cargo =

- Theatrical release poster
- Spanish: Cámara oscura
- Directed by: Pau Freixas
- Screenplay by: Pau Freixas; Héctor Claramunt
- Produced by: Joan Bosch
- Starring: Silke; Unax Ugalde
- Cinematography: Julián Elizalde
- Edited by: Jaume Martí
- Music by: Manel Gil; Rudy Gnutti
- Production companies: Iris Star; Manga Films; Estudios Picasso
- Distributed by: Manga Films
- Release dates: 27 November 2003 (Sitges); 27 August 2004 (Spain)
- Country: Spain
- Language: Spanish
- Budget: €3.5 million

Deadly Cargo or Dark Chamber (Spanish: Cámara oscura) is a 2003 Spanish psychological horror thriller film directed by Pau Freixas from a screenplay by Freixas and Héctor Claramunt which stars Silke and Unax Ugalde.

== Plot ==
The plot follows the members of an underwater diving expedition (including freelance photographer Sara and instructor Iván) hiding on a gloomy hulk used for people trafficking after being left afloat for a while in the wake of their vessel enduring a wreck off the West African coast.

== Cast ==
- Silke as Sara
- Adrià Collado as Víctor
- Diana Lázaro as Thaïs
- Unax Ugalde as Iván
- Andrés Gertrúdix as Edgar
- Mustafa Jawara as Drui
- Lluís Homar as Capitán
- Juan Fernández as Salomón
- Josep M. Domènech as Antón

== Production ==
The film is an Iris Star, Manga Films, and Estudios Picasso production and it had the participation of Telecinco and TVC. It boasted a €3.5 million budget. Shooting locations included Vilanova i la Geltrú.

== Release ==
Deadly Cargo screened out of competition as the opening film of the 36th Sitges Film Festival on 27 November 2003. Distributed by Manga Films, it was released theatrically in Spain on 27 August 2004.

== Reception ==
Jonathan Holland of Variety considered that "far the best of a recent crop of Spanish teen thrillers", the "stylish" film manages to exploit "a decent budget, good perfs and self-assured helming".

Alberto Bermejo of El Mundo rated the film 2 out of 5 stars, praising the "steady pace and believability of the characters' harrowing wanderings on the boat" but also writing about the sailors' characters exposing "the lack of entity" of a script and a mise-en-scène both lacking the necessary depth.

== See also ==
- List of Spanish films of 2004
