= Merry Christmas (2000 film) =

2000 film

Felicidades
- DVD Poster
- Directed by: Lucho Bender
- Written by: Lucho Bender; Pablo Cedrón
- Produced by: Emilio Bender; Juan Bucich; Cecilia Hecht; Gabriela Tagliabue
- Starring: Gastón Pauls; Luis Machín; Silke; Carlos Belloso; Alfredo Casero; Pablo Cedrón
- Cinematography: Daniel Sotelo
- Edited by: Emilio Bender; Silvina Soto
- Music by: Andrés Goldstein; Daniel Tarrab
- Distributed by: Bendercine S.A.
- Release dates: 5 September 2000 (Italy); 7 September 2000
- Running time: 100 minutes
- Countries: Argentina; Italy
- Languages: Spanish; Hebrew

Felicidades (English: congratulations - international title: Merry Christmas) is a 2000 comedy-drama film written and directed by Lucho Bender and starring Gastón Pauls, Pablo Cedrón, Silke, Luis Machín, Carlos Belloso and Alfredo Casero. It was premiered at the Venice Film Festival in Italy on September 5 and in Argentina on September 7, 2000.

The picture was Argentina's official submission for the 73rd Academy Awards and won two Silver Condor Awards whilst being nominated for nine different categories. Lucho Bender won Best First Film.

== Cast ==
- Luis Machín as Juan
- Gastón Pauls as Julio
- Silke as Laura
- Pablo Cedrón as Rodolfo
- Carlos Belloso as Comedian
- Alfredo Casero as Fredi
- Marcelo Mazzarello as Paralytic
- Cacho Castaña as Cueto
- Fabián Arenillas as Aguilera
- Eduardo Ayala as Starosta
- Federico Cammarota as Old man
- Fatty Iastrebner as Emilio
- Mariana Arias as Party Woman
- Henry Meziat as Party man
- Mariano Fraomeni as Fredi's neighbour
- Mariana Otero as Salesgirl
- Catalina Speroni as Street neighbour
- Anahí Martella as Street neighbour
- Jorge Román as Nursery man
- Luciano Cazaux as Doctor

== See also ==
- List of Christmas films
