= Silke (actress) =

Spanish actress

- Born: Silke Hornillos Klein; 6 February 1974 (age 52); Madrid, Spain
- Occupation: Actress
- Years active: 1992–2006

Silke Hornillos Klein, better known as Silke (born 6 February 1974), is a Spanish former actress.

== Biography ==
Silke Hornillos Klein was born on 6 February 1974 in Madrid to a Spanish father and a German mother. She made her feature film debut with a minor role in Club Virginia Orchestra (1992). She gained notoriety for her performances in Hi, Are You Alone? (1995) and Earth (1996). The latter work earned her a nomination to the Goya Award for Best New Actress. She put an end to her film career in 2006.

== Selected filmography ==
Film
Year	Title	Role	Notes	Ref.
1995	Hola, ¿estás sola? (Hi, Are You Alone?)	Niña		
1996	Tierra (Earth)	Mari		
1996	Tengo una casa (I Have a House)	Kelly		
2000	Km. 0	Amor		
2000	Almejas y mejillones (Clams and Mussels)	Inma		
2000	Felicidades	Laura		
2001	Tuno negro (Black Serenade)	Alejandra Alonso		
2001	Tre Mogli (Three Wives)	Billie		
2003	Sansa	Paloma		
2003	Cámara oscura (Deadly Cargo)	Sara		
2004	Iris	Iris		
2004	Al otro lado	Eva		
2006	La hora fría (The Dark Hour)	María		.
