= Nacho Fresneda =

Spanish actor (born 1971)

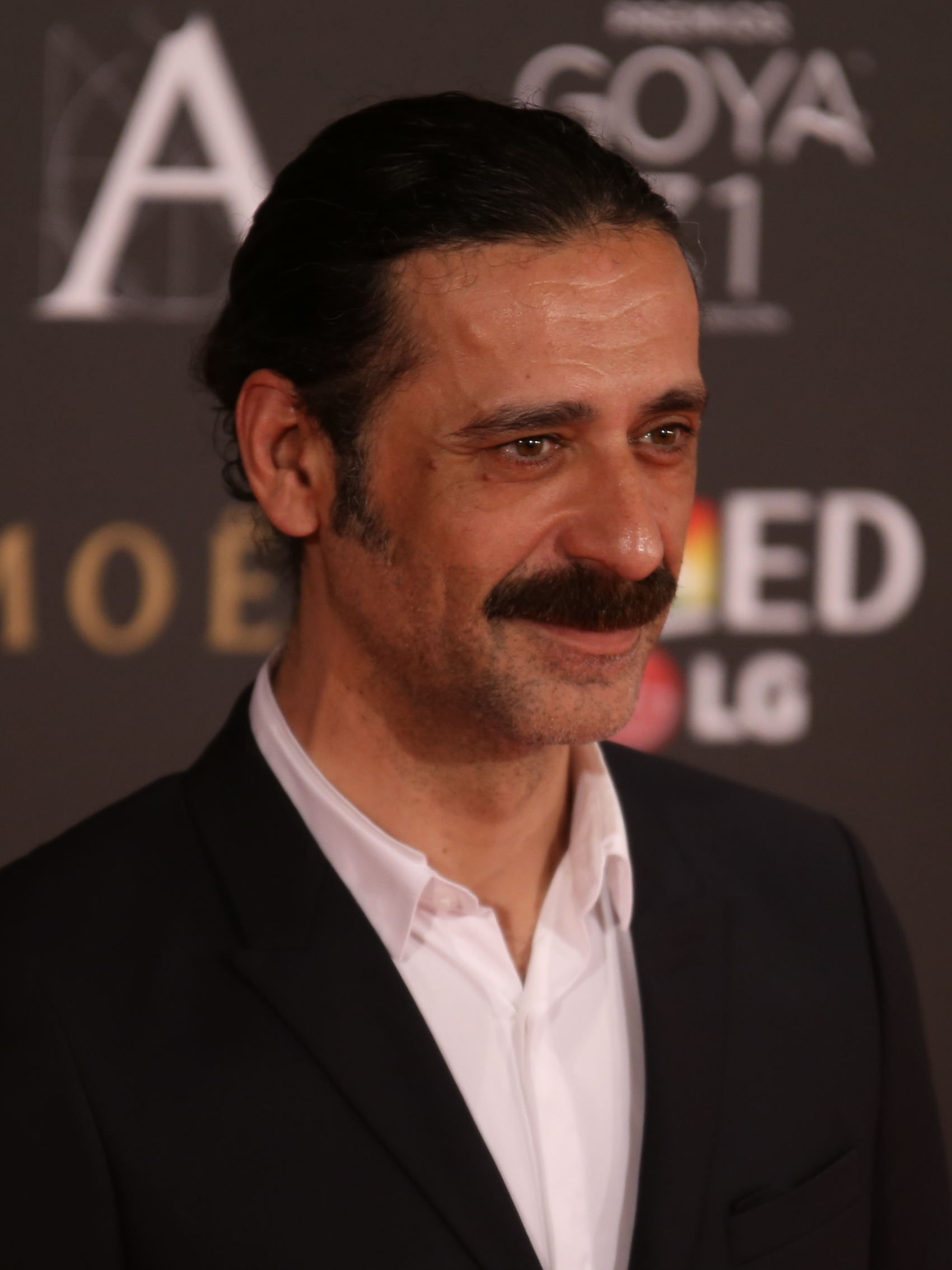
- Fresneda in 2017
- Born: José Ignacio Fresneda García; 19 June 1971 (age 53); Quart de Poblet, Spain
- Occupation: Actor

José Ignacio Fresneda García (born 19 June 1971), better known as Nacho Fresneda, is a Spanish screen and stage actor.

He became popular for his portrayal of Alonso de Entrerríos in the time travel television series El ministerio del tiempo.

== Life and career ==
Fresneda was born in 1971 in Quart de Poblet, Valencia Province.

He played doctor Mauricio Salcedo in the series Amar en tiempos revueltos. He hit the international scene in 2011 when he played Driss Larbi in the crime series La Reina del Sur.

== Filmography ==
=== Feature films ===
Tramway to Malvarrosa (Tranvía a la Malvarrosa) (1997), by José Luis García Sánchez
Tre mogli (2001), by Marco Risi .
La gran mentira del rocanrol (2002), by Tono Errando .
The Bum's Lullaby (La tarara del chapao) (2003), by Enrique Navarro .
Febrer (2004), by Sílvia Quer
Iris (2004), by Rosa Vergés
Atlas of Human Geography (2007), by Azucena Rodríguez
The Realm (2018), by Rodrigo Sorogoyen
The Silence of the Marsh (2019), by Marc Vigil

=== Short films ===
Sonata (2013), by Jon Ander Tomás
I do not plan to return (2001), by Alicia Puig
Los Planetas (2006), by José Carlos Ruiz
Salvador (History of an everyday miracle) (2007), by Abdelatif Hwidar

== Dubbing ==
- Rollerball (2002), as Sanjay (Naveen Andrews).
- Tears of the Sun (2003), as Terwase (Peter Mensah).
- Crash (2004), as Farhad (Shaun Toub).
- The Hangover (2009), as Stu Price (Ed Helms).
- The International (2009), as General Charles Motomba (Lucian Msamati).
- Terminator Salvation (2009), as Marcus Wright (Sam Worthington).
- Clash of the Titans (2010), as Perseus (Sam Worthington).
- Buried (2010), as Jabir (José Luis García Pérez).
- The Hangover Part II (2011), as Stu Price (Ed Helms).
- Wrath of the Titans (2012), as Perseus (Sam Worthington).
- The Hangover Part III (2013), as Stu Price (Ed Helms).
- Alisa, que no fue así (2015), as August

== Television ==
=== Series ===
- Ambitions (1998)
- El cor de la Ciutat (2000–2008) as Huari Ajiram
- Hospital Central (2002–2008) as Manuel Aimé Torrente Fresneda reappeared in the last episode of the 19th season.
- Amar en tiempos revueltos ("To Love in troubled times") (2009–2010)
- La Reina del Sur (2011) as Dris Larbi
- Gran Nord (2012–2013) as Ermengol Tarrés
- Víctor Ros (2015) as Fernando de la Escosura
- El ministerio del tiempo (2015–2020) as Alonso de Entrerríos
- El Señor de los Cielos (2019–2020) as Renzo Volpi
- Madres. Amor y vida (2020) as Chema.

=== Episode ===
- A flor de pell
- Mirall trencat (2002) as Felip
- Le dernier seigneur des Balkans (2005) as Dino Rispoli
- Infidels (2009) as Marc Guasch
- Hispania, la leyenda (2010) as Octavio
- Ángel o demonio (2011)
- Manual de supervivencia (2013) as Carlos
- El don de Alba (2013) as Carlos Abrantes
- Isabel (2013) as Aben Hud
- Los misterios de Laura (2014) as Nicolás Madera. The mystery of the crime of the century. (Episode 7, Season 3.)
- La que se avecina (2014), as Jorge Crespo

=== Movies for TV ===
- Another city (2003), by César Martínez Herrada
- Viure sense by (2005), by Carlos Pérez Ferré
- Projecte Cassandra (2005), by Xavier Manich

== Theatre ==
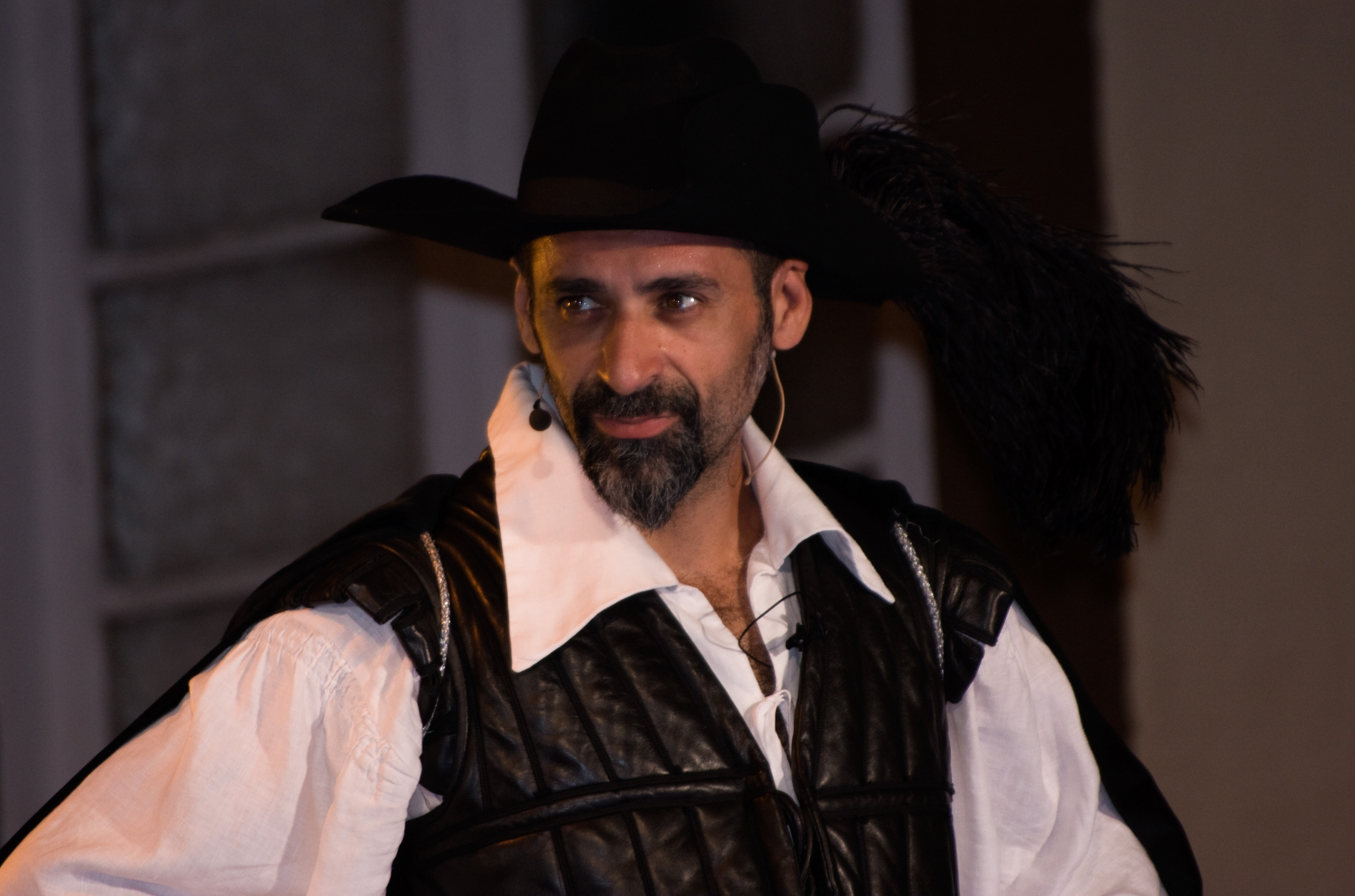
Fresneda as Don Juan Tenorio in 2010

- Enigmatic Variations, directed by Christophe Lidón.
- Ángel, directed by Jaume Pujol.
- Macbeth, directed by Calixto Bieito.
- Por menjar-se ànima, directed by Carmen Portacelli.
- The Cherry Orchard, directed by Lluís Pasqual.
- Cándido, directed by Carles Alfaro.
- No teasing with love, directed by Dennise Rafter
- Titanic. Pavana spectacles
- Blood Wedding. Shakespeare Foundation of Valencia
- Le Bourgeois gentilhomme. Teatre Micalet.
- The Trojans, by Euripides. Adaptation by Alberto Conejero, directed by Carmen Portacelli

== Awards and nominations ==
In the 2017 Feroz Awards, Fresneda was nominated as Best Leading Actor in a Series for The ministry of Time.
