= Walter Reyno =

Uruguayan actor

- Born: 13 February 1935; Montevideo, Uruguay
- Died: 3 December 2014 (aged 79); Montevideo, Uruguay
- Occupation(s): Actor and director

Walter Reyno (13 February 1935 – 3 December 2014) was a Uruguayan actor and theater director. He was known for his roles in 25 Watts and El aura.

Reyno was born in Montevideo, Uruguay and died there from respiratory failure, aged 79.

== Filmography ==
- Dormir al sol (2012)
- Cruz del Sur (2011) as Walter
- El pájaro de Comala (cortometraje, 2008) as Actor
- La cáscara (2007) as Manuel
- Matar a todos (2007) as General Gudari
- El cojonudo (cortometraje, 2005) as Don Dogomar
- El aura (2005) as Montero
- Alma mater (2004) as Man with hat
- La espera (2002) as Modesto
- El ojo en la nuca (cortometraje, 2001) as General Díaz
- 25 Watts (2001) as Don Héctor
- Mi querido hereje (1999)
- Un crisantemo estalla en cinco esquinas (1998) as El Zancudo
- Otario (1997)
- Patrón (1995)
- Viento del Uruguay (1989)
- El lugar del humo (1978)
