= Catalina Speroni =

Argentine actress

Catalina Speroni (January 1, 1938 – December 21, 2010) was an Argentine film, stage and television actress whose career spanned more than 40 years.

Her film credits included Felicidades, Cómpices, Tatuado and El despertar de L. Her television credits included roles on Campeones de la Vida, Calabromas and La familia Benvenuto.

== Death ==
Speroni died on December 21, 2010, at the age of 72 after an illness. She was buried at the cemetery in the Chacarita neighborhood of Buenos Aires.
