= Criminal (2004 film) =

- Theatrical release poster
- Directed by: Gregory Jacobs
- Screenplay by: Gregory Jacobs; Sam Lowry
- Based on: Nueve reinas by Fabián Bielinsky
- Produced by: George Clooney; Gregory Jacobs; Steven Soderbergh
- Starring: John C. Reilly; Diego Luna; Maggie Gyllenhaal
- Cinematography: Chris Menges
- Edited by: Stephen Mirrione
- Music by: Alex Wurman
- Production company: Section Eight Productions
- Distributed by: Warner Independent Pictures
- Release date: September 10, 2004
- Running time: 87 minutes
- Countries: United States; Argentina
- Language: English

Criminal is a 2004 American crime drama film co-written and directed by Gregory Jacobs and a remake of the Argentine film Nine Queens (2000). It stars John C. Reilly, Diego Luna, Maggie Gyllenhaal, and Maeve Quinlan. The film is a production of Section Eight, the production company of Steven Soderbergh and George Clooney.

== Plot ==
Richard Gaddis is a small-time crook with a penchant for con games. To hook marks, he acts and dresses like a well-to-do businessman, believing that one must look like a professional in order to be a successful conman.

Gaddis is searching for a new partner with whom he can perform more sophisticated cons. He discovers Rodrigo after he sees the young man playing some minor con games in a casino-bar. When Rodrigo is caught, Gaddis acts the part of a vice officer to save him from being arrested. Rodrigo's contribution is a face and naive manner so trustable that he is able to con anyone, while Richard is both completely unprincipled and clever. After several small tests to determine Rodrigo's trustworthiness, he suggests a partnership, to which Rodrigo quickly agrees.

Although Rodrigo distrusts Richard greatly, he agrees to partner him on a gigantic scam, provided he gets a percentage of the money gained to help his ailing father, who is in trouble because of his gambling debts. Richard accepts, and they plan to sell a fraudulent version of a silver certificate currency note to William Hannigan, a rich collector who is in town.

When Hannigan takes a fancy to the uptight Valerie, Gaddis' sister who is a concierge at a hotel, Gaddis is forced to pull her into the scam, the price of which is Richard's admission to their brother Michael that he has cheated him out of his share of their inheritance. The plot twists constantly as each of the characters becomes more deeply invested in the scam, and the ever-deceitful Richard tries to cheat Rodrigo, Valerie and Michael out of their share of the take.

In a twist ending, it is revealed that all the major players involved, including Rodrigo and Hannigan, were playing a "confidence game" against Gaddis from the very beginning, so that Valerie and Michael could rightfully take their share of their inheritance.

== Cast ==
- John C. Reilly as Richard Gaddis
- Diego Luna as Rodrigo
- Maggie Gyllenhaal as Valerie
- Maeve Quinlan as Laura
- Peter Mullan as William Hannigan
- Jonathan Tucker as Michael
- Ellen Geer as Grandma
- Malik Yoba as Frank Hill
- Laura Ceron as Waitress
- Zitto Kazann as Ochoa
- Michael Shannon as Gene

== Production ==
=== Adaptation ===
Criminal is based on the Argentine classic crime film Nine Queens (2000), directed by Fabián Bielinsky. The original story has also been adapted in Hindi as Bluffmaster! (2005), and in Malayalam as Gulumaal: The Escape (2009).

== Reception ==
On the review aggregator website Rotten Tomatoes, 69% of 123 critics' reviews are positive, with an average rating of 6.4/10. The website's consensus reads: "If you saw Nine Queens, it may feel redundant, but the snappy performances make it fun to watch." Metacritic, which uses a weighted average, assigned the film a score of 61 out of 100, based on 35 critics, indicating "generally favorable" reviews.
