= Iris (2004 film) =

- Film poster
- Directed by: Rosa Vergés
- Screenplay by: Jordi Barrachina; Rosa Vergés
- Starring: Silke; Ana Torrent; Ginés García Millán; Nacho Fresneda; Martirio; Mariana Cordero; Fermí Reixach; Mercè Pons; Miquel Gelabert; Paca Gabaldón; Abel Folk
- Cinematography: Mario Montero
- Edited by: Frank Gutiérrez
- Music by: Mauricio Villavecchia
- Production company: Ovideo TV
- Release dates: April 2004 (Málaga); 16 July 2004 (Spain)
- Country: Spain
- Language: Spanish

Iris is a 2004 Spanish historical melodrama film directed by Rosa Vergés which stars Silke as the title character alongside Ana Torrent, Ginés García Millán, Nacho Fresneda, and Martirio.

== Plot ==
Chagrined and married photographer Iris becomes a war reporter during the Spanish Civil War, falling romantically and marrying doctor Óscar, who goes missing during the conflict.

== Cast ==
- Silke as Iris
- Ana Torrent as Magdalena
- Ginés García Millán as Óscar
- Martirio as Rosario
- Mariana Cordero as Iris (old)
- Fermí Reixach as Papicactus
- Miquel Gelabert as José
- Nacho Fresneda as Damián
- Paca Gabaldón as Virtudes
- Abel Folk as Miguel
- Mercè Pons as Ágata

== Production ==
The film was produced by Ovideo TV and it had the participation of and Canal+ and TVC. Shooting locations included Barcelona, Blanes, and Mataró.

== Release ==
The film was presented in the official selection of the 7th Málaga Film Festival in April 2004. Distributed by Solida, it was released theatrically in Spain on 16 July 2008.

== Reception ==
Jonathan Holland of Variety wrote that the film "never comes close to provoking either a tear or, intentionally at least, a smile".

== See also ==
- List of Spanish films of 2004
