= El asadito =

- Directed by: Gustavo Postiglione
- Written by: Gustavo Postiglione
- Produced by: Miren Martinetti
- Starring: Tito Gómez
- Cinematography: Fernando Zago
- Edited by: Gustavo Postiglione
- Music by: Iván Taravelli
- Distributed by: Primer Plano Film Group S.A. Transeuropa Video Entertainment
- Release date: 9 November 2000
- Running time: 71 minutes
- Country: Argentina
- Language: Spanish

El asadito ("The little barbecue") is a 2000 Argentine black-and-white film drama directed and written by Gustavo Postiglione. The movie was filmed in Rosario and premiered on 9 November 2000 in Buenos Aires. It was nominated for two Silver Condor Awards for Best Cinematography and Best Film Editing in 2001.

== Cast ==
- Tito Gómez
- Gerardo Dayub
- Héctor Molina
- Raúl Calandra
- Carlos Resta
- David Edery
- Daniel Briguet
- Pablo Fossa
