= Una historia de tango =

- Directed by: Hernán Vieytes
- Based on: a story by Roberto Fontanarrosa
- Starring: Ulises Dumont; Daniel Miglioranza; Gregory Dayton
- Release date: 2000
- Running time: 24 minute
- Country: Argentina

Una historia de tango ("A History of Tango") is a 2000 short musical film from Argentina. The film was directed by Hernán Vieytes and stars Ulises Dumont as Rubén Raigal, a singer with a mysterious past. It is based on a story by Roberto Fontanarrosa.

== Synopsis ==
Daniel Miglioranza and Gregory Dayton appear as two friends who are whisked away to a secret nightclub where Rubén sings, reducing everyone to tears. Backstage, they meet him, and he tells a tragic story connected with Japan and the tango.
