= Fabián Bielinsky =

Argentine film director (1959–2006)

- Born: 3 February 1959; Buenos Aires, Argentina
- Died: 28 June 2006 (aged 47) (Note: Bielinsky was found dead on Thursday 29 June 2006; according to police, he had died the previous day.); São Paulo, Brazil
- Education: ENERC
- Occupations: Film director; screenwriter
- Years active: 1983–2006
- Children: 1

Fabián Bielinsky (3 February 1959 – 28 June 2006) was an Argentine film director and screenwriter. After years working in advertising and as an assistant director, he wrote and directed two features, the crime caper Nine Queens (2000) and the neo-noir The Aura (2005). Both won the Silver Condor awards for Best Film, Best Director and Best Original Screenplay from the Argentine Film Critics Association, and The Aura was Argentina's entry for the Academy Award for Best Foreign Language Film. Nine Queens was sold to some 30 countries and remade in Hollywood as Criminal (2004).

Bielinsky died of a heart attack at the age of 47, two days after The Aura won six Silver Condor awards. In a 2022 survey of the best films in the history of Argentine cinema, Nine Queens ranked tenth and The Aura twelfth.

== Early life ==
Bielinsky was born in Buenos Aires on 3 February 1959. He began making films as a member of the student film group at the Colegio Nacional de Buenos Aires, and in 1972, at the age of thirteen, shot his first short film, an adaptation of the Julio Cortázar story "Continuity of Parks". After finishing school he studied psychology for a time, then dropped out in favor of the film school of the National Institute of Cinema and Audiovisual Arts. He graduated in 1983 with the short film La espera, based on a story by Jorge Luis Borges, which won first prize at the Huesca International Film Festival in Spain.

== Career ==
=== Assistant direction and advertising ===
Bielinsky entered the film industry around 1983 as an assistant director, working on features by directors including Miguel Pérez, Carlos Sorín, Marco Bechis and Eliseo Subiela. In parallel he built a career in advertising, and by the late 1990s had worked on more than 400 television commercials, among them a Renault Mégane spot that Wim Wenders filmed in Argentina. For a time he also taught film production and film analysis. In 1998 he shared the screenwriting credit on Fernando Spiner's science fiction film La sonámbula, recuerdos del futuro (released internationally as Sleepwalker) with Spiner and the novelist Ricardo Piglia.

=== Nine Queens ===
In 1998 Bielinsky entered his script for Nine Queens (Spanish: Nueve reinas), about two con men trying to sell a block of forged rare stamps, in a screenwriting competition organized by Patagonik Film Group. It beat around 350 other submissions, with production financing as the first prize. Released in Argentina on 31 August 2000, Nine Queens became one of the country's biggest domestic hits in at least a decade and was later sold to some 30 countries. It won seven Silver Condor awards, including Best Film, Best Director and Best Original Screenplay, as well as 21 international prizes. Reviewing it for Variety, Todd McCarthy wrote that "David Mamet might kill for a script as good". In 2002 the magazine named Bielinsky one of its ten directors to watch.

Hollywood studios offered Bielinsky the chance to direct an English-language remake himself, which he turned down. Warner Bros. acquired the rights, and the remake, Criminal (2004), was directed by Gregory Jacobs, produced by Steven Soderbergh and George Clooney and starred John C. Reilly and Diego Luna. It was received less warmly than the original.

=== The Aura ===
Bielinsky's second feature, The Aura (Spanish: El aura, 2005), again starred Ricardo Darín, this time as a taxidermist who fantasizes about committing the perfect crime. A somber neo-noir without the humor of Nine Queens, it did not repeat its predecessor's box office success but was well received by critics. On 26 June 2006 it won six Silver Condor awards, including Best Film, Best Director and Best Original Screenplay, and it was Argentina's entry for the Academy Award for Best Foreign Language Film at the 78th Academy Awards.

Characters in both of Bielinsky's films mention "El Turco", a powerful underworld figure who never appears on screen.

== Personal life and death ==
Bielinsky was married and had a son. He died of a heart attack in his sleep on 28 June 2006, at the age of 47, in a hotel room in São Paulo, where he had traveled to cast a commercial two days after receiving the Silver Condor awards for The Aura. He had reportedly suffered from hypertension. At the time of his death he was due to present The Aura at the Edinburgh International Film Festival later that year.

== Legacy ==
In 2011 Bielinsky posthumously received a Konex Award as one of the five best Argentine film directors of the decade. In the 2022 edition of the Encuesta de cine argentino, a survey on the greatest Argentine films, Nine Queens ranked tenth and The Aura twelfth. Nueve auras (2025), a documentary about his career directed by Mariano Frigerio, features interviews with collaborators including Darín, Gastón Pauls and Leticia Brédice; it screened at the Mar del Plata International Film Festival before premiering on HBO Max on 27 November 2025.

== Filmography ==
Year	Title	Director	Writer	Notes
1983	La espera	Yes	Yes	Short film
1998	La sonámbula, recuerdos del futuro	No	Yes	Co-written with Fernando Spiner and Ricardo Piglia
2000	Nine Queens	Yes	Yes	
2005	The Aura	Yes	Yes	

== Sources ==
- Shaw, Deborah (2007). "Playing Hollywood at its Own Game? Bielinsky's Nueve reinas". In Shaw, Deborah (ed.). Contemporary Latin American Cinema: Breaking into the Global Market. Rowman & Littlefield. pp. 67–85.
- Tompkins, Cynthia (2008). "Fabián Bielinsky's El aura [The Aura]: Neo-noir Inscription and Subversion of the Action Image". Confluencia. 24 (1): 17–27. JSTOR 27923311.
- Zamostny, Jeffrey (2015). "Ricardo Darín and the Animal Gaze: Celebrity and Anonymity in "El aura"". Confluencia. 30 (2): 154–166. JSTOR 43490112.
