= Gastón Pauls =

Argentine actor, TV host and producer (born 1972)

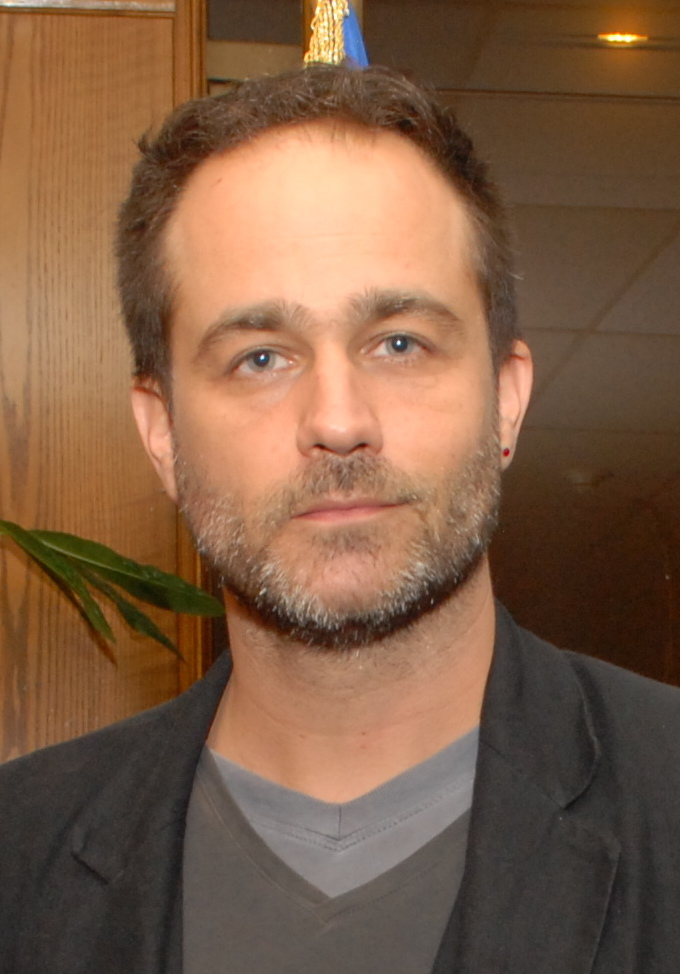
- Gastón Pauls, (2013)
- Born: February 17, 1972 (age 54); Buenos Aires, Argentina
- Occupations: actor, TV host and producer
- Years active: 1993–present
- Height: 1.74 m (5 ft 8 1/2 in)
- Partner: Agustina Cherri (2007–2014)
- Children: Muna Pauls Cherri (b. 2009); Nilo Pauls Cherri (b. 2011)
- Parent(s): Alex Pauls and Marina Guerrero
- Relatives: Cristian Pauls (brother); Alan Pauls (brother); Nicolás Pauls (brother); Ana Pauls (sister)

Gastón Pauls (born January 17, 1972) is an Argentine actor, TV host and producer.

== Biography ==
Born in Buenos Aires, Argentina, Pauls comes from a family of artists. His mother was a painter, his father a film producer, and his paternal grandparents dancers.

== Career ==
Pauls started his career on television as a host of a videoclip show before starring in the teen soap opera Montaña Rusa. He then starred on Verdad Consecuencia, one of Adrián Suar's first TV hits on Canal 13. Pauls participated in productions of Alejandro Doria and in the novels Alas, poder y pasión, Mamitas. In theater he did Desde la lona, Porteños, La gata sobre el tejado de zinc. In cinema his first was Territorio comanche alongside Imanol Arias and Cecilia Dopazo. But it was his participation in the memorable Nine Queens by Fabián Bielinsky alongside Ricardo Darín and Leticia Brédice that gave him international recognition and the award for best actor in Biarritz. Then in 2003 he decided to return to television in the scripted Tres padres solteros and the show Ser Urbano a mix of fiction, journalism, and factual documentary broadcast until 2006 by Telefe. In 2005 Pauls founded with Alejandro Suaya a production company called Rosstoc S.A., in which he surrounded himself with a dynamic team of quality professionals and with which he created programs such as "Mejor hablar de ciertas cosas", "Todos contra Juan" and "Ciega a citas". The production company would declare bankruptcy in 2010. In 2008 Pauls both acted in and produced Todos contra Juan. Actor Steve Carell guested in the final episode. He made fiction documentary about the media called "Miedos de Comunicación". In 2015 he made a film about the life of Padre Carlos Mugica, he wrote the screenplay with Mariano Starosta. Currently he hosts every Monday from 21 to 23 "Mi Otro Yo" on the radio del Plata AM 1030.

== Personal life ==
Gastón met Nancy Dupláa in the teen soap opera Montaña Rusa whom he dated for two years. From 2007 to 2014, Pauls was in a relationship with fellow Argentine actress Agustina Cherri, with whom he had two children, daughter Muna (2009) and son Nilo (2011). He is a vegetarian.

== Television ==
Year	Title	Character	Channel	Notes
1994–1995	Montaña rusa	El Trece	Alejandro	
1996	Verdad consecuencia	El Trece		
1997	El Rafa	Telefe	El Bebe	
1998	Alas, poder y pasión	El Trece	Matías Esquivel	
1999	Mamitas	Azul Televisión	Martín	
2000	Tiempo final	Telefe	Alemán	Episode: «El secuestro»
2002	Tumberos	América TV	David	
2002	Infieles	Canal 9		Episode: «El caso M.»
2003	Tres padres solteros	Telefe	Guillermo Nelber	
2003	La vida aquí		Miguel	Spain
2004	Historias de terror	Canal 7		Episode: «La horla»
2004	Los Roldán	Telefe	Gastón Pauls	Cameo
2004	Sangre fría	Telefe	Mochilero	
2006	Soy tu fan	Canal 9	Nicolás	
2008	Todos contra Juan	América	Juan Perugia	
2009	Dromo	América		Episode: «Ovo»
2009	Ciega a citas	Canal 7	Martín Trauma	Special performance
2010	Todos contra Juan 2	Telefe	Juan Perugia	
2011	Un año para recordar	Telefe	Dante Peñalba/Juan Cruz Indart	protagonist
2013	Historia clínica	Telefe	Carlos Jauregui	
2015	Conflictos modernos	Canal 9		

== Movies ==
Year	Movie	Character	Director	Notes
1993	Lucha sobre el sida			
1996	Territorio comanche	Manuel	Gerardo Herrero	Spanish movie
1997	Inex, la sombra de la verdad	Martín Loaiza		
1998	La sonámbula, recuerdos del futuro	Gorrión	Fernando Spiner	
1998	Buenos Aires me mata	cameo	Beda Docampo Feijóo	
1998	El desvío	Sebastián	Horacio Maldonado	
1998	Frontera Sur	Mariano Huertas	Gerardo Herrero	Spanish-French-German-Argentine co-production
2000	Ojos que no ven	Esteban	Beda Docampo Feijóo	
2000	Nueces para el amor	Marcelo	Alberto Lecchi	
2000	Nine Queens	Juan	Fabián Bielinsky	
2000	Felicidades	Julio	Lucho Bender	
2001	La cautiva	Gastón Biraben		Movie television
2002	Sábado	Gastón Pauls	Juan Villegas	
2002	El lugar donde estuvo el paraíso	Enrico		Spanish movie
2002	El Último tren	Jimmy Ferreira	Diego Arsuaga	Movie co-produced by Argentine, Spain and Uruguay
2002	Antibody	Julio Palacio	Christian McIntire	American movie
2003	Regresados		Flavio Nardini and Cristian Bernard	
2003	Chicas rolingas			
2003	Rapid Exchange	Javier		
2003	La vida aquí	Miguel		
2005	Iluminados por el fuego	Esteban Leguizamón	Tristán Bauer	
2005	Solo un ángel	Doctor in childbirth	Horacio Maldonado	
2005	La suerte está echada	Guillermo		
2005	La demolición		Marcelo Mangone	
2005	El último café			Short film
2006	Fuga	Ricardo Coppa	Pablo Larraín	Chilean-Argentine film
2006	Una estrella y dos cafés	Carlos		
2007	Las mantenidas sin sueños			
2007	El salto de Christian	Miche		
2008	La mujer de hielo	Marcos		
2008	Che: Guerrilla	Ciro Bustos		
2009	Miserias			
2009	Cabeza de pescado			
2012	Días de vinilo	Damián		
2012	El vagoneta en el mundo del cine			
2012	Paseo de oficina	Blas Benedetto		
2012	La educación prohibida	Profesor Javier		
2012	La danza de la realidad	Soldado Comunista		
2013	20.000 besos	Goldstein		
2014	Fermín	Ezequiel Kaufman		
2017	El Sereno	Fernando	Oscar Estevez and Joaquin Mauad	Uruguayan film by Oscar Estevez
2017	Un lugar en el Caribe	Fernando		Honduran movie, United States co-production
2018	Palau			
2019	La guarida del lobo			
2019	Maravilla			Argentine movie
2019	The Prince	"Che Pibe"	Sebastián Muñoz	Chilean-Argentine film

=== TV programs ===
Year	Title	Channel
2003	Proyecto 48	TNT
2003	Ser urbano	Telefe
2004	Ser urbano 2	Telefe
2005	Humanos en el camino	Telefe
2006	Humanos en el camino	Telefe
2007	Titulares	Fox Sports
2007	Pecados capitales, el que esté libre...	Telefe
2008	Mejor hablar de ciertas cosas	Encuentro
2009	Mejor hablar de ciertas cosas	Encuentro

=== Productions ===
Year	Title	Channel	Type of program
2007	Humanos en el camino	Telefe	Television show
2008	Todos contra Juan	América	Unitary fiction
2009	Mejor hablar de ciertas cosas	Encuentro	Television show
2009	Mitos	América	Unitary fiction
2009–2010	Ciega a citas	Televisión pública	Daily fiction
2010	Todos contra Juan 2	Telefe	Unitary fiction
