= El viento (film) =

- Directed by: Eduardo Mignogna
- Written by: Eduardo Mignogna; Graciela Maglie
- Produced by: Christian Blanco; Claudio Etcheberry; José Antonio Félez
- Starring: Federico Luppi; Antonella Costa; Pablo Cedrón; Mariana Briski; Esteban Meloni
- Cinematography: Marcelo Camorino
- Edited by: Marcela Sáenz
- Music by: Juan Ponce de León
- Release date: 4 August 2005
- Running time: 92 minutes
- Country: Argentina
- Language: Spanish

El viento (English: The Wind) is a 2005 Argentine film directed and co-written by Eduardo Mignogna and starring Federico Luppi, Antonella Costa and Pablo Cedrón. This was Mignogna's last film.

== Synopsis ==
Old ranch hand Frank Osorio (Luppi) travels from Patagonia to Buenos Aires to bring the news of his daughter's demise to his granddaughter, Alina (Costa). The film chronicles the week they share at Alina's apartment, the mending of their estranged relationship and the ultimate truth that Frank has been keeping from her about her father's identity.
