= Roly Santos =

Argentinean filmmaker

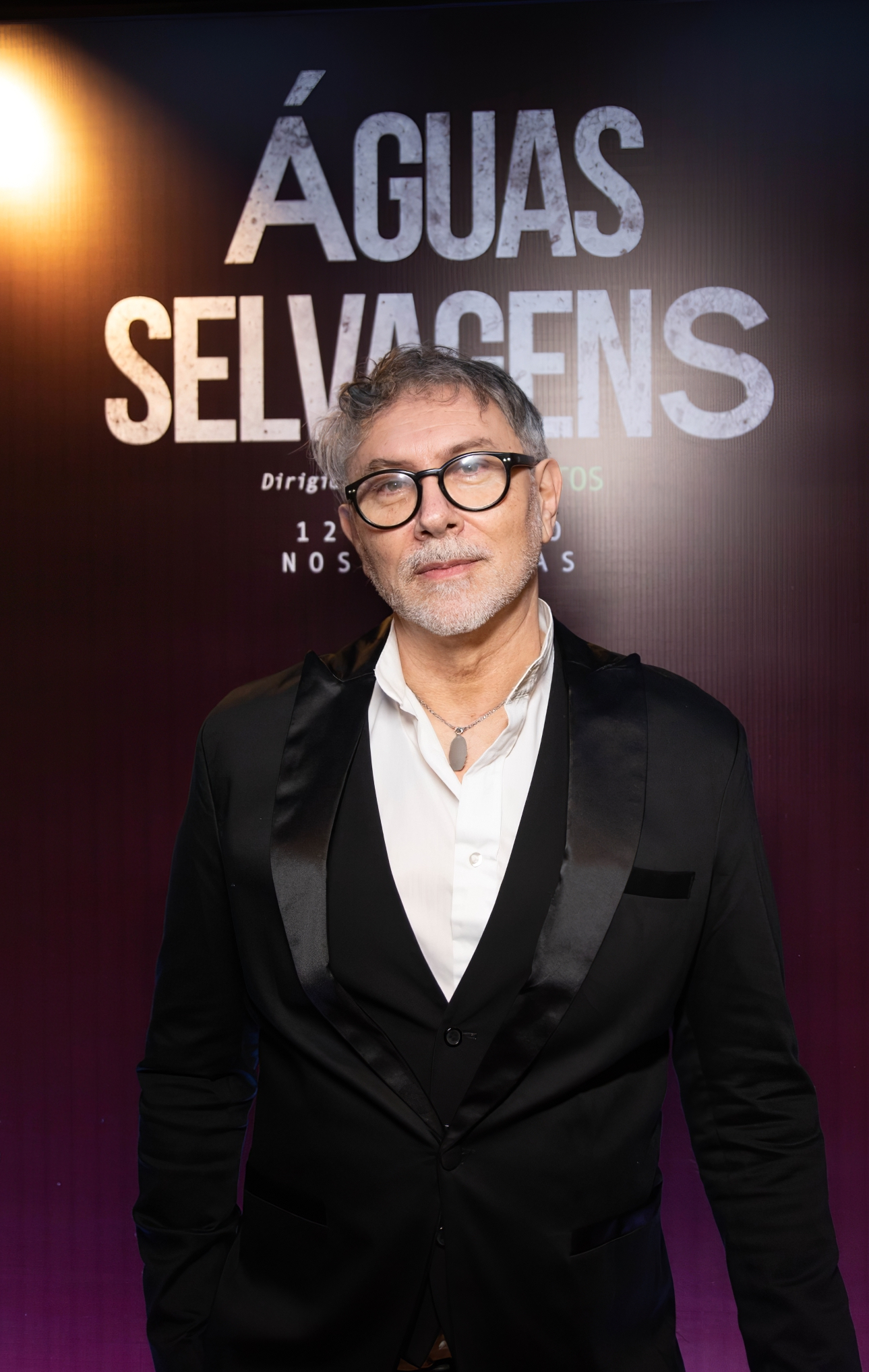
Director Roly Santos

Roly Santos is an Argentinean filmmaker, screenwriter, and producer. Santos made his directorial debut with How Silly We Are to Grow Up (2000) and, in 2017, co-directed Coffee for All alongside Fulvio Iannucci, which was released on Netflix. Santos is a member of DAC - Directores Argentinos Cinematograficos, the association of Argentine film directors.

== Education ==
Santos graduated from Escuela Nacional de Experimentación y Realización Cinematográfica (ENERC) (Argentina's National School of Film) in the 1980s, and later acquired a sociology degree from Universidad de Buenos Aires (University of Buenos Aires) in 1991.

== Career ==
Santos produced films in many countries around the world. His directorial debut, How Silly We Are to Grow Up, was a fiction feature film (2000-Official Selection San Sebastian, IFF La Havana, and IFF Figueira Foz). Roly Santos worked as producer and director on TV shows, movies, and documentaries such as Crisol, Hi India, and New Dubliners. He received Best Director and Best Edition awards for Hands Together—a documentary feature—in Figueira Film Art (2015). With his Italian partners, he created Caffè Sospeso, a feature documentary released by Netflix in 2018 with the English title "Coffee For All". Santos also produced and directed Dedalo, a fiction series. In 2019 he produced and directed a fiction feature Water Pigs, also known as "Agua dos Porcos/Aguas Selvagens", a co-production between Argentina and Brazil.

=== Author/teacher ===
Santos teaches about labor rights and intellectual property rights for technicians, directors, actors, and musicians of the film industry worldwide. He is a member of "DAC" Argentine Directors, Argentores (scriptwriters), and 100autori (Italy). He was founder and coordinator of FEDALA America Latin Writers and Film Directors Federation, 2003–2010.

- Argentine Cultural Industries,(Publics policies and economic market) - research collaboration with author O. Getino
- Violence on television children programs (1994) - author.

=== Activity under military dictatorship period ===
- 1980 - When "Mothers of the Plaza de Mayo" began their rounds around the square, very few Argentines were present. Santos filmed some of the events. As a film director, he accompanied them at times during the civic-military dictatorship, documenting marches and the repressions suffered by the Mothers and himself.
- 1982 - "When our classmate Roly Santos and Kino González shot social and testimonial film content, so they were expelled from School Film military authority".

== Filmography ==
=== Film Director ===
- 2019: Agua dos Porcos (Fiction feature)
- 2018: Dedalo (Fiction Series)
- 2017: Café pendiente (Documentary)
- 2016: New Dubliners (Documentaries Series).
- 2015: Hola India (Documentaries Series).
- 2014: Manos Unidas (Documentary feature and Series).
- 2013: Crisol (Documentaries Series)
- 2000: Que absurdo es haber crecido (Fiction feature)
- 1988: Diálogos en el Noroeste (Short).
- 1986: Revelación (Short).

=== Screen Writer ===
- 2016: New Dubliners
- 2015: Hola India
- 2014: Manos Unidas
- 2013: Crisol (Documentaries Series)
- 2000: Que absurdo es haber crecido
- 1988: Diálogos en el Noroeste
- 1986: Revelación

=== Producer ===
- 2020 Letto numero 6 (Fiction feature – co-producer)
- 2019: Agua dos Porcos/Aguas Selvagens (co-producer)
- 2018: Dedalo
- 2017: Café pendiente (co-producer)
- 2016: New Dubliners
- 2015: Hola India
- 2014: Manos Unidas
- 2013: Crisol (Documentaries Series)
- 2000: Que absurdo es haber crecido
- 1988: Diálogos en el Noroeste
- 1986: Revelación

=== Cameraman ===
- 2017: Café pendiente
- 2016: New Dubliners
- 2015: Hola India
- 2014: Manos Unidas

=== Editing ===
- 1986: Gombrowicz o la seducción (Documentary)
