= Nine Queens =

- Theatrical release poster
- Directed by: Fabián Bielinsky
- Written by: Fabián Bielinsky
- Produced by: Cecilia Bossi; Pablo Bossi
- Starring: Ricardo Darín; Gastón Pauls; Leticia Brédice
- Cinematography: Marcelo Camorino
- Edited by: Sergio Zóttola
- Music by: César Lerner
- Production companies: Patagonik Film Group; Naya Films S.A.
- Distributed by: Buena Vista International
- Release date: August 31, 2000 (Argentina)
- Running time: 114 minutes
- Country: Argentina
- Language: Spanish
- Budget: US$1.3 million
- Box office: AR$7 million (Argentina); US$12.4 million (International)

Nine Queens (Spanish: Nueve reinas) is a 2000 Argentine heist crime drama film written and directed by Fabián Bielinsky. It stars Ricardo Darín, Gastón Pauls and Leticia Brédice. The story revolves around two con artists who team up to sell a block of counterfeit rare stamps (the "Nine Queens") to a wealthy foreign collector, and the set of conflicts they go through to achieve their goal.

Nine Queens was theatrically released in Argentina on August 31, 2000, by Buena Vista International. The film received praise for its screenplay, Bielinsky's direction, acting performances, and its tone; it is considered an Argentine film classic. Nine Queens was a commercial success, grossing $12.4 million worldwide.

In 2022, it was selected as the 10th greatest film of Argentine cinema in a poll organized in 2022 by the specialized magazines La vida útil, Taipei and La tierra quema, which was presented at the Mar del Plata International Film Festival. Also in 2022, the film was included in Spanish magazine Fotogramas's list of the 20 best Argentine films of all time.

== Plot ==
In the early hours, con artist Juan successfully scams a cashier at a convenience store, and is apprehended by the staff as he attempts the same scam on a different cashier. Fellow con artist Marcos feigns being a police officer and takes Juan away from the store. Marcos requests Juan be his partner for the day, saying his has recently disappeared. Although reluctant, Juan agrees because his father, also a con man, is in jail and requires $70,000 to bribe a judge at his hearing.

Later that day, the pair are presented an elaborate and lucrative scheme when Sandler, Marcos' elderly former associate, contacts him to help sell the "Nine Queens", a counterfeit sheet of rare stamps, to Vidal Gandolfo, a wealthy Spanish collector staying at the hotel where Marcos' sister, Valeria, works. Vidal will be deported from Argentina the following day due to corruption charges.

Vidal meets with Marcos and Juan. Lacking sufficient time to properly authenticate the stamps, Vidal hires an expert who confirms their validity. Vidal offers $450,000 for the stamps, with the exchange to take place that evening. Outside the hotel, the expert tells Marcos and Juan he knew the stamps were forged and demands a bribe. The fake stamps are then stolen out of Juan and Marcos' hands by thieves on a motorcycle who, unaware of their value, toss them into a river.

To salvage the scheme, Marcos and Juan approach Sandler's widowed sister Berta; her deceased husband owned the real stamps. She agrees to sell for $250,000. Marcos says he can put up $200,000 and asks Juan to contribute the remaining $50,000, but Juan becomes suspicious of Marcos since it is the exact amount of money he so far has saved. After visiting his father in jail, he ultimately agrees to the arrangement and the pair buy the real stamps.

Marcos and Juan return to the hotel to meet Vidal. After finding out Valeria is Marcos' sister, Vidal says he will now only buy the stamps if he is able to have sex with Valeria. Valeria agrees, and says her price for doing so is for Marcos to confess to their younger brother, Federico, that Marcos cheated both Valeria and Federico out of their family inheritance. After he does so, Valeria spends the night with Vidal.

The next morning, Valeria informs them that Vidal paid for the stamps with a certified check. On their way to the bank, an attempted mugging is revealed to be an attempted con by Marcos to cheat Juan out of his share; Juan reveals he hid the check and will hand it to Marcos as they reach the bank. Upon arrival, they see a crowd outside and learn the bank has failed due to fraud by the management, making the check worthless. Juan, looking disillusioned, walks away, while Marcos sticks around to see if he can find a way to still get the money.

Juan arrives at a warehouse, where he greets the motorcycle thieves, Vidal, Sandler, Berta, and Valeria, who is Juan's girlfriend – revealing that the real con was to swindle Marcos out of $200,000, as revenge for all the times he cheated his family and his partners.

== Cast ==
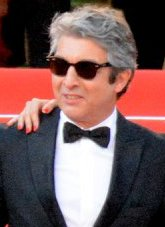
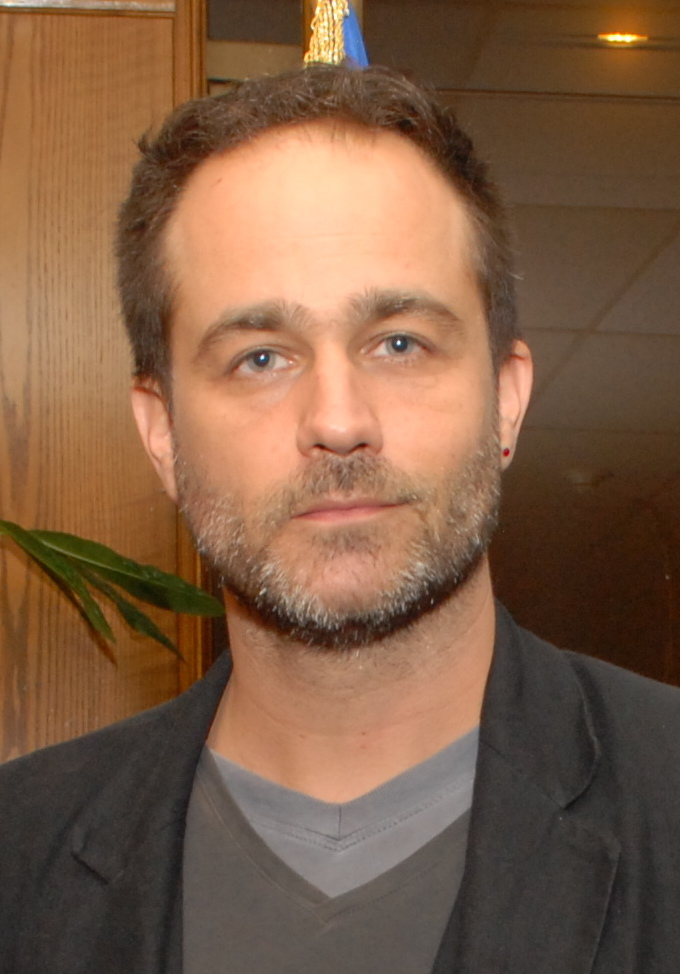
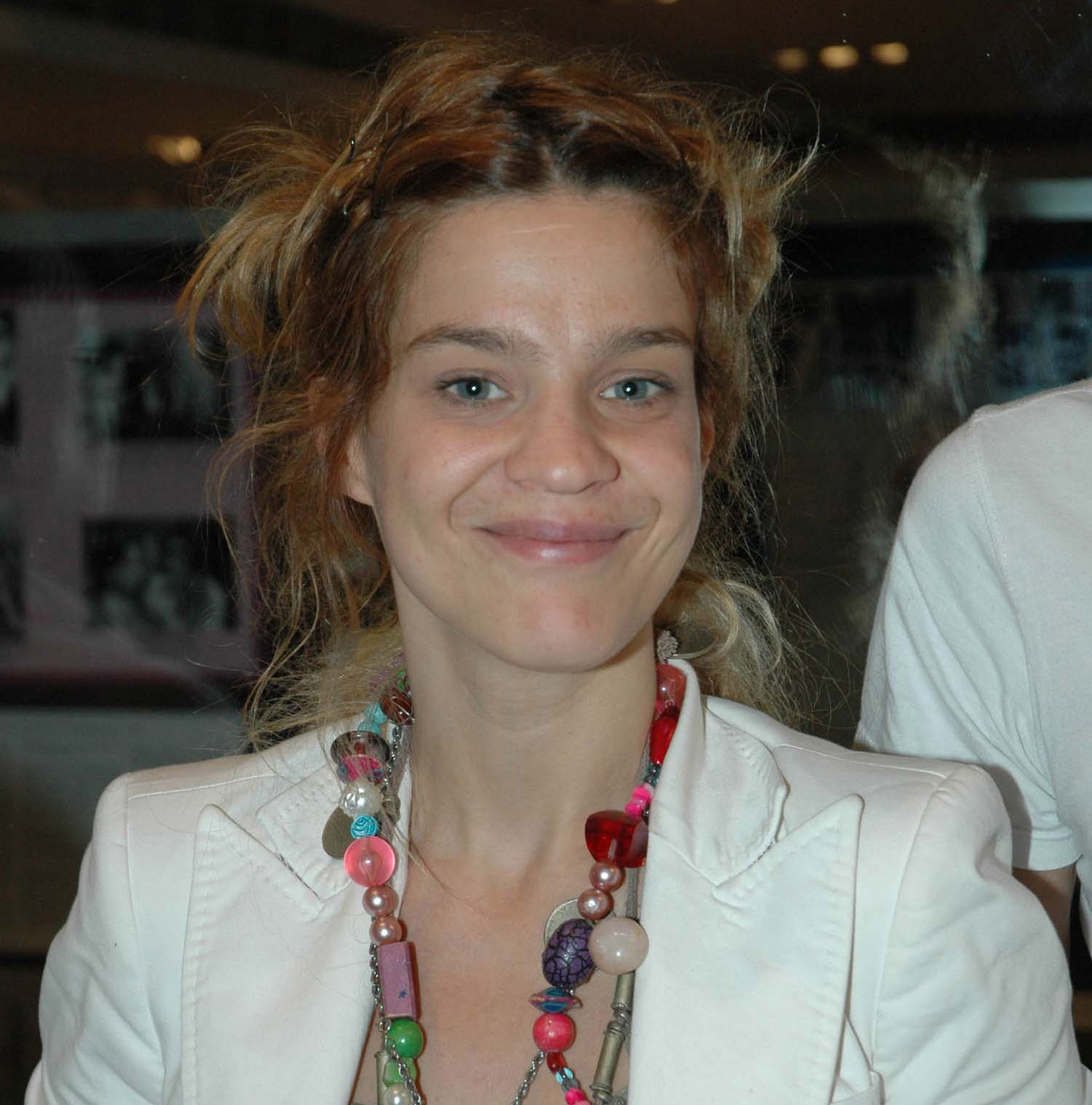
Ricardo Darín, Gastón Pauls, and Leticia Bredice star in the film
- Ricardo Darín as Marcos: An experienced con artist who leads a scam against Vidal Gandolfo with Juan.
- Gastón Pauls as Juan: A con artist who unexpectedly partners with Marcos.
- Leticia Brédice as Valeria: Marcos and Federico's sister and a hotel employee who is embroiled in a legal battle against Marcos for rights to their family inheritance.

Additionally, Ignasi Abadal plays "Esteban Vidal Gandolfo", a rich, corrupt Spanish stamp collector. Tomás Fonzi portrays Federico, Marcos and Valeria's younger brother. Oscar Núñez and Celia Juárez portray Sandler and Mrs. Sandler, while Elsa Berenguer appears as Berta, Sandlers's sister and a widow who sells the stamps. Antonio Ugo, Jorge Noya, Alejandro Awada, Ricardo Díaz Mourelle, and Roberto Rey portray D'Agostino, Aníbal, Washington, Ramiro (Juan's father), and Texan, all local conmen who have worked with Marcos and Sandler. Leo Dyzen appears as the stamp expert.

== Production ==
=== Development and pre-production ===
Writer-director Fabián Bielinsky finished the screenplay for the film in 1997, which he wrote in less than sixty days. He based the script on real scams that happened to his family members and books about scams, and aimed for it to have an objective point of view in order to maintain the logic of the film itself. The script was initially titled Farsantes (transl. fakers), but Bielinsky changed it as he considered it revealed too much of the story. He chose Nine Queens for its poker-related connotations. Bielinsky had planned Nine Queens as part of a "conceptual trilogy", with each film focused on a different aspect of filmmaking. Nine Queens was the first installment focused on mise-en-scène, The Aura was focused on point of view, and the third film would have been focused on editing.

He unsuccessfully tried to sell the script for over a year. According to Bielinsky, "producers didn't like it" as the Argentine film industry "isn't very fond of genre films." In 1998, he submitted the script for a contest organised by production company Patagonik Films —one of the companies that rejected the idea— and was awarded first place out of 260 scripts submitted. The project was stalled for almost two years after Bielinsky won the contest, as Patagonik had the film Clams and Mussels (2000) as a priority over Nine Queens.

Marcelo Camorino joined the project as director of photography in February 2000. The film would originally star Leonardo Sbaraglia as Juan and Gabriel Goity as Marcos. Sbaraglia had read the script a year and a half before it was produced and was already committed to filming Intacto (2001) by the time Nine Queens was to begin production. He left the project a month before filming began. After Sbaraglia dropped out, the studio decided to cast Ricardo Darín instead of Goity. Gastón Pauls joined the film shortly before the start of production. Auditions were held for every role except for Pauls, Darín, and Leticia Brédice. For the role of Vidal Gandolfo, the studio wanted to cast an Argentine actor who spoke a "perfect Spanish accent", but Bielinsky refused as he considered that would take audiences out of the film. Ignasi Abadal was ultimately cast in the role.

=== Filming and post-production ===
Before filming was scheduled to begin, Bielinsky shot scenes for a week with Pauls, Darín, and a reduced crew as a "warm-up". They then had another week of pre-production before filming. Filming lasted for seven weeks. A steadicam was used for over 30 days, which was expensive for the limited budget available. The film was shot entirely on location, using 35mm film. Most scenes on the streets were filmed using hidden cameras, as the limited budget prevented the extensive amount of extras that were needed, in order not to have bystanders looking at the camera. As the actors were already famous, a small of group of extras was hired to surround them and prevent people from getting close to them. To capture "the veracity of what happens on the street", the crew would film quickly for short stretches of time. Bielinsky aimed for an "absolutely simple, transparent" mise-en-scène, contrasting the complexity of the plot.

Marcelo Salvioli, the film's art director, initially expressed concern for the hotel scenes included in the script, as it would be difficult to find a location that would fit the requirements and that would allow them to use it. The hotel should "not have any nobility, it had to be a new American chain, a place where cheating prevailed". The Hilton Hotel in the neighbourhood of Puerto Madero was coincidentally being built. Producer Pablo Bossi was friends of one of the owners of the hotel and managed to get the location. Filming was often hindered by noises and disorder, as the hotel was under construction, as well as guests and unavailable rooms and spaces. Filming at a bank also brought difficulties, as no banks would let the production film inside. The scene was eventually shot at a former bank on Avenida Corrientes that had gone bankrupt. Its use required a judge's authorization. Three lanes had to be closed for the scene, the gathering crowd was included in the film.

The final scene at the warehouse was filmed twice. The scene was first filmed close to the end of filming. Bielinsky was unsatisfied with how the scene was shot, so about a week after the end of filming, while the editing process had already begun, the scene was reshot. The only shots from the first version were those of Vidal Gandolfo, as Abadal had already returned to Spain.

Nine Queens was shot on film, transferred to digital and edited on Avid Media Composer. According to editor Sergio Zóttola, who had already edited over 50 films, it was "the first script I worked with that could not be touched. The moment you removed something a piece of information was lost and everything fell apart. It was so tight that nothing could be changed. It was brilliant."

== Themes ==
It has been argued that the film draws attention to the endemic nature of corruption in the Argentinian society before the turn of the century, whilst demonstrating a national desire of the population "to take action against the corrupt and greedy (embodied in Marcos) in the absence of a reliable justice system".

== Release ==
=== Theatrical ===
Nine Queens was released in Argentina by Buena Vista International on August 31, 2000. It was screened at various film festivals across South America after its domestic theatrical release, including at the Lima Film Festival in August, and the Bogotá Film Festival and the Mar del Plata International Film Festival in November. It then premiered at several U.S. film festivals, including Telluride Film Festival in September and AFI Fest in November, and at the Toronto International Film Festival in September. In Europe, the film premiered at the Lleida Latin-American Film Festival in January 2001, Fantasporto in March, Biarritz Film Festival in June, Fantasy Filmfest in September, and the Films from the South in November.

In South America, the film was theatrically released by Buena Vista International. It was distributed in North America by Sony Pictures Classics and Lions Gate Films for the remaining territories. The film began screening in Brazil on 7 June 2001 and in Chile one week later. It was released in Spain on 24 August and had a limited release in the U.S. from 19 April 2002. The film released in France on 4 September.

In September 2023, Nine Queens was remastered in 4K with Dolby Digital sound by Patagonik and was screened at the 71st San Sebastián International Film Festival, with the involvement of the film's original cinematographer Marcelo Camorino. A complete restoration of the film was screened in the official section of 2024 Cannes Film Festival and at the Fantastic Fest in September. In October, FilmSharks acquired the worldwide distribution and remake rights: it announced partnerships with several distributors, including Eurozoom for France, A Contracorriente for Spain, Warner Bros. Discovery for Eastern Europe, and Curzon for the United Kingdom and Ireland, with release dates yet to be announced; Sony Pictures Classics renewed its license to distribute the film in North America. FilmSharks also struck a deal with Star Distribution (formerly Buena Vista) and theatrically re-released the film in South America on February 22, 2024, where it was later made available on Disney+.

=== Home media ===
Nine Queens was released on VHS format on 9 February 2001 and on DVD on 1 October 2002. It was released on Blu-ray format in North America by Sony Pictures Classics on 15 October 2024.

== Reception ==
=== Box office ===
In Argentina, Nine Queens became the "movie hit of the year", and the highest-grossing film in over ten years. It was screened in 49 theaters and had 64,027 spectators in its first four days. In its third week in theaters, it surpassed the 300,000 spectators. It ended its theatrical run with a box office gross of 7 million pesos and over 1.5 million spectators, becoming the biggest local film of 2000, and the third film overall, only surpassed by American films Dinosaur and Mission: Impossible 2. Nine Queens remained in the top ten throughout the rest of the year. Internationally, the film earned over US$2 million in Spain, $1.25 million in the U.S. (which was regarded as a 'modest success'), and over €1.5{ million in France, as well as almost US$1 million in England and 18 million Chilean pesos in Chile.

=== Critical response ===
Nine Queens garnered mostly positive reviews from film critics. On review aggregator website Rotten Tomatoes, the film holds a 92% approval rating based on 95 reviews, with an average rating of 7.4/10. The site's consensus reads: "Deliciously twist-filled, Nine Queens is a clever and satisfying crime caper." On Metacritic, the film has a weighted average score of 80/100 based on 30 reviews, indicating "generally favorable reviews".

Roger Ebert, in his review of Nine Queens for the Chicago Sun-Times, gave the film a score of three out of four stars, commending its screenplay and calling the film "an elegant and sly deadpan comedy." Michael Wilmington of the Chicago Tribune awarded the film three-and-a-half out of four stars, and called it "One of the most clever, most enjoyable thrillers in years." Orlando Sentinel film critic Roger Moore gave the film four stars out of five, writing, "the laughs are dark, the puzzle steadily more engrossing and the surprises, just like Heist, are doozies, up to the finale." Edward Guthmann of the San Francisco Chronicle also gave the film a positive review, writing: "Fast-paced and unerringly surprising, Nine Queens is nicely performed by a large cast [...] David Mamet plowed this con-the-con turf in Heist, House of Games and The Spanish Prisoner, but Bielinsky, in his directing debut, makes it seem sassy and reinvented."

Geoff Pevere of The Toronto Star wrote in his review of the film: "If Nine Queens draws you on a journey that eventually leads up a garden path toward your own suckerhood, it's all the more pleasurable for having done so with such slick expertise." BBC film critic Tom Dawson called the film "a welcome addition to the genre" and a "taut thriller a powerful allegorical resonance."

=== Accolades ===
Award	Date of ceremony	Category	Recipient(s)	Result	Ref.
AFI Fest	1–11 November 2001	International Competition	Nine Queens	Nominated	
Biarritz International Festival of Latin American Cinema	7 October 2001	Best Actor	Ricardo Darín (tie)	Won	
Biarritz International Festival of Latin American Cinema	7 October 2001	Best Actor	Gastón Pauls (tie)	Won	
Bogotá Film Festival	9–17 October 2001	Best Film	Nine Queens	Nominated	
Bogotá Film Festival	9–17 October 2001	Best Director	Fabián Bielinsky	Won	
Bogotá Film Festival	9–17 October 2001	Audience Award	Nine Queens	Won	
British Independent Film Awards	30 October 2002	Best International Independent Film	Nine Queens	Nominated	
Fantasporto	22 February–3 March 2002	Best Screenplay	Fabián Bielinsky	Won	
Festival du Film Policier de Cognac	14 April 2002	Grand Prix	Nine Queens	Won	
Festival du Film Policier de Cognac	14 April 2002	Audience Award	Nine Queens	Won	
Grande Prêmio do Cinema Brasileiro	12 September 2002	Best Foreign Feature Film	Nine Queens	Nominated	
Lima Film Festival	3–12 August 2001	First Prize, Audience Award	Nine Queens	Won	
Lleida Latin-American Film Festival	2001	Best Director	Fabián Bielinsky	Won	
Lleida Latin-American Film Festival	2001	Audience Award	Nine Queens	Won	
Mar del Plata International Film Festival	15 March 2001	ADF Prize for Best Cinematography	Marcelo Camorino	Won	
Mar del Plata International Film Festival	17 March 2001	Audience Award	Nine Queens	Won	
Oslo Films from the South Festival	12–21 October 2001	Audience Award	Nine Queens	Won	
Sant Jordi Awards	9 April 2002	Best Foreign Actor	Ricardo Darín (also for Son of the Bride)	Won	
Silver Condor Awards	29 May 2001	Best Film	Nine Queens	Won	
Silver Condor Awards	29 May 2001	Best First Film	Nine Queens	Nominated	
Silver Condor Awards	29 May 2001	Best Director	Fabián Bielinsky	Won	
Silver Condor Awards	29 May 2001	Best Actor	Ricardo Darín	Won	
Silver Condor Awards	29 May 2001	Best Supporting Actress	Elsa Berenguer	Won	
Silver Condor Awards	29 May 2001	Best Original Screenplay	Fabián Bielinsky	Won	
Silver Condor Awards	29 May 2001	Best Original Score	César Lerner	Nominated	
Silver Condor Awards	29 May 2001	Best Cinematography	Marcelo Camorino	Won	
Silver Condor Awards	29 May 2001	Best Art Direction	Marcelo Salvioli	Nominated	
Silver Condor Awards	29 May 2001	Best Editing	Sergio Zóttola	Won	

== Remakes ==
After Nine Queens was released in the United States, several American studios started talks with Bielinsky to produce a remake. In 2003, Warner Bros. bought the film rights for the production company Section Eight founded by George Clooney and Steven Soderbergh for a reported figure around US$1.5 million. The film, titled Criminal (2004), was directed by Gregory Jacobs and written by Jacobs and Soderbergh. The film was a commercial failure and only received a direct-to-DVD release in Argentina.

Nine Queens was also used as a basis for three Indian films: the Bollywood film Bluffmaster! (2005), the Malayalam film Gulumal (2009) and the Telugu film All the Best (2012).

In October 2023, FilmSharks acquired distribution rights for the film, along with format rights for a spin-off TV series.
