= Attack of the Killer Hog =

- Directed by: Agustín Cavalieri
- Written by: Agustín Cavalieri
- Produced by: Agustín Cavalieri
- Starring: Gabriel Grieco
- Cinematography: Fernando Zago
- Edited by: Agustín Cavalieri
- Distributed by: Epix Media
- Release date: December 2000
- Running time: 107 minutes
- Country: Argentina
- Language: Spanish

Attack of the Killer Hog is a 2000 Argentine horror film directed and written by Agustín Cavalieri and Marcos Meroni. The film premiered in December 2000 in Buenos Aires and was released also in Germany with an 18 certificate by Epix Media.

== Cast ==
- Agustín Cavalieri
- Diego Contreras
- Diego Ferraro
- Gabriel Grieco
- Soledad Irusta
- Marcos Meroni
- Juan Dardo Moreira
- Christian Diego Palazzo
- Verónica Pelaccini
- Horacio Trenado
