= Clams and Mussels =

- Poster
- Spanish: Almejas y mejillones
- Directed by: Marcos Carnevale
- Written by: Marcos Carnevale
- Produced by: Albana Bolster
- Starring: Jorge Sanz; Leticia Brédice; Loles León; Antonio Gasalla; Silke
- Cinematography: Alfredo F. Mayo
- Edited by: Jorge Valencia
- Music by: Luis Elices; Francisco Musulén
- Production companies: Alma Ata International Pictures S.L. Antena 3 Millecento Cinema; Naya Films S.A. Patagonik Film Group; Vía Digital
- Distributed by: Buena Vista International
- Release dates: 17 August 2000 (Argentina); 27 October 2000 (Spain)
- Running time: 92 minutes
- Countries: Argentina; Spain
- Language: Spanish
- Budget: $4 million
- Box office: $18 million

Clams and Mussels (Spanish: Almejas y mejillones) is a 2000 Argentine-Spanish comedy film directed and written by Marcos Carnevale based on a story by Lito Espinosa. It stars Leticia Brédice and Jorge Sanz alongside Loles León, Antonio Gasalla, and Silke.

== Synopsis ==
Paula has money and convinces Rolondo to accompany her to play poker. Over time Rolondo falls in love with her, but as it turns out, Paula is a lesbian. Rolondo lives in the carnivals of Tenerife in the Pub Morocco (a gay bar) where Fredy performs (intimate friend of Paula). The atmosphere of absolute freedom and sensuality that surrounds him little by little opens Rolondo's mind.

== Cast ==
- Jorge Sanz .... Dr. Rolondo Irazábal/Diana
- Leticia Brédice .... Paola
- Antonio Gasalla .... Fredy
- Silke .... Inma
- Loles León .... Socorro
- Divina Gloria .... Samantha
- Gerardo Baamonde .... Waiter
- Ernesto Claudio .... Quique
- María Cárdenas .... Consuelo
- Cecilia Sarli .... Wardrobe girl
- Deftler Boog .... Dr. Zupnik
- Didier Roussel .... Poker Player #1
- Ulises Hernández .... Poker Player #2
- Valentín Fariña .... Fishmonger
- Daniel Álvarez .... Producer
- David Amador .... Young man at boat
- Jaime Falero .... Carlos

== See also ==
- List of Argentine films of 2000
- List of Spanish films of 2000
