= Leticia Brédice =

Argentine actress

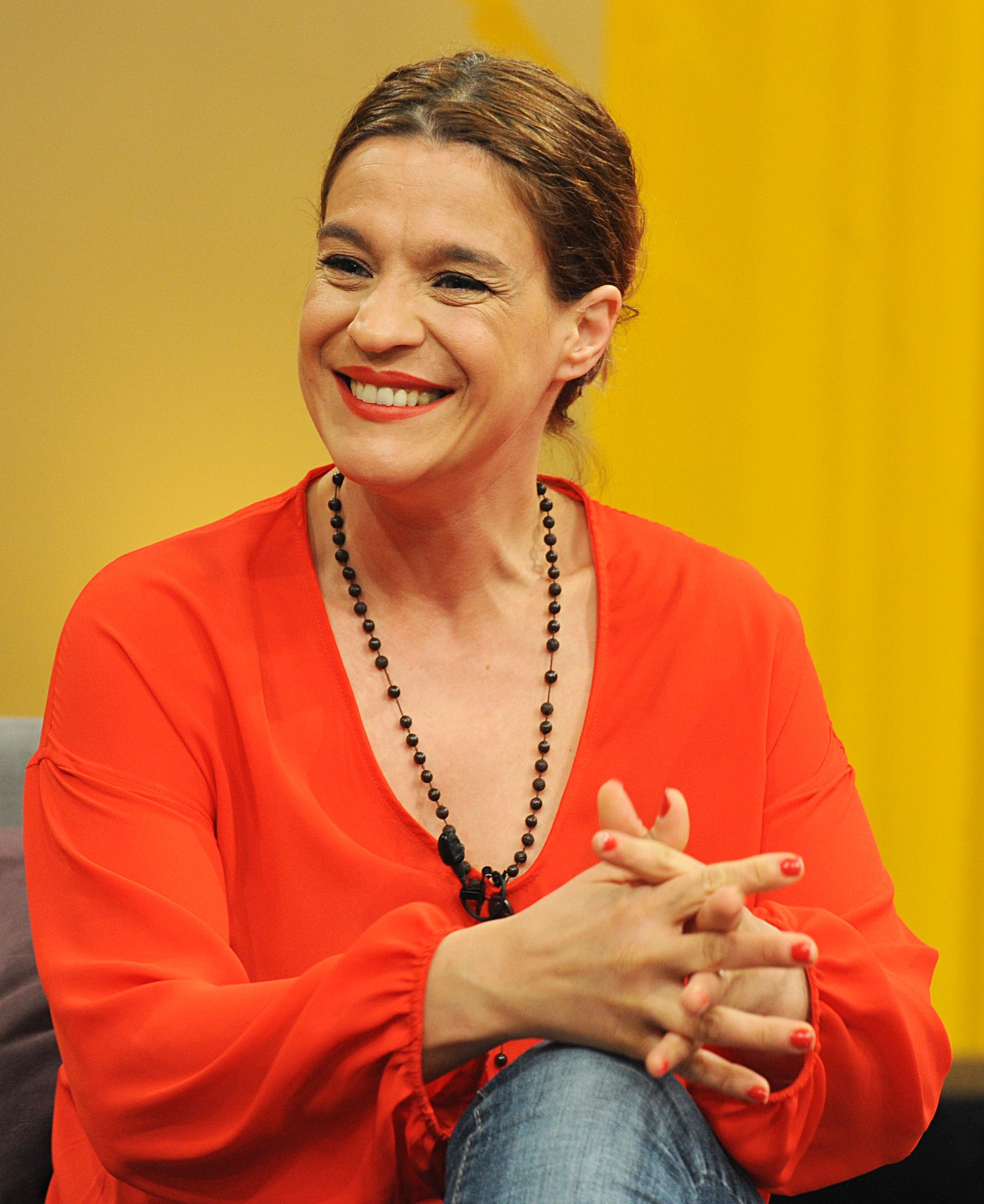
- Born: Leticia Marcela Brédice; July 26, 1975 (age 51); Buenos Aires, Argentina
- Occupations: Actress and Singer
- Years active: 1991-present
- Partner(s): Juan Pablo Sanguinetti (2005-2008); Mariano Airaldi (2009-2015); Federico Parrilla (2015-2020)
- Children: 1
- Relatives: Ananda Brédice (Niece)

Leticia Marcela Brédice (born July 26, 1975) is an Argentine actress and singer.

== Career ==
Brédice won Best New Actress Award from the Argentine Film Critics Association in 1993 for Anni Ribelli. In 1997, she has also won Best Supporting Actress Award by the same association for her work on Cenizas del paraíso. She appeared in Fabián Bielinsky's 2000 Heist film Nine Queens, and has appeared on stage in several productions, including Panorama Desde El Puente, Lolita, Marta Stutz, Seis Personajes En Busca de Un Actor, and Closer.

== Personal life ==
From 2005 to 2008, Brédice was in a relationship with the musician Juan Pablo Sanguinetti. She gave birth to their child, a son, on August 11, 2005. From 2009 to 2015, she was in a relationship with the multimedia artist Mariano Airaldi. From 2015 to 2020, she was in a relationship with Federico Parrilla.

== Filmography ==
=== Movies ===
| Year | Movie | Character | Director |
|---|---|---|---|
| 1991 | La peste | | Luis Puenzo |
| 1996 | Años rebeldes | Laura | Rosalía Polizzi |
| 1997 | Ashes of Paradise | Ana Muro | Marcelo Piñeyro |
| 1997 | Sin querer | | Ciro Cappellari |
| 1998 | Cómplices | Vera | Néstor Montalbano |
| 2000 | Cóndor Crux, la leyenda | Zonia | Juan Pablo Buscarini and Swan Glecer |
| 2000 | Burnt Money | Giselle | Marcelo Piñeyro |
| 2000 | Clams and Mussels | Paula | Marcos Carnevale |
| 2000 | Nine Queens | Valeria | Fabián Bielinsky |
| 2001 | La mujer de mi vida | Faby | Antonio del Real |
| 2002 | En la ciudad sin límites | Eileen | Antonio Hernández |
| 2002 | Kamchatka | Teacher | Marcelo Piñeyro |
| 2002 | Muertos de amor | | Beda Docampo Feijóo |
| 2002 | ¿Sabés nadar? | | Diego Kaplan |
| 2003 | El día que me amen | Mara | Daniel Barone |
| 2004 | Ay Juancito | Ivonne Pascal | Héctor Olivera |
| 2005 | La suerte está echada | Linda del Ponte | Sebastián Borensztein |
| 2008 | El frasco | Romina | Alberto Lecchi |
| 2008 | Impunidad | Julia | Javier Torre |
| 2009 | Tetro | Josefina | Francis Ford Coppola |
| 2012 | Todos contentos | | Eduardo Milewicz |
| 2013 | El amor a veces | | Eduardo Milewicz |
| 2014 | Gato negro | Elvira | Gastón Gallo |
| 2014 | Arrebato | Laura Grotzki | Sandra Gugliotta |
| 2014 | Rosa fuerte | Cristina | Laura Dariomerlo |
| 2015 | Francis: Pray for Me | Cecilia | Beda Docampo Feijóo |
| 2015 | El espejo de los otros | María | Marcos Carnevale |
| 2016 | 8 tiros | Gabriela | Bruno Hernández |
| 2017 | Un viaje a la luna | Susi | Joaquín Cambre |
| 2018 | Museum | Sherezada Ríos | Alonso Ruizpalacios |
| 2019 | Bruja | Marisa | Marcelo Páez Cubells |
| 2019 | ¿Yo te gusto? No perdonarás | Mary | Edgardo González Amer |
| 2020 | Respira: Transgenesis | Verónica | Gabriel Grieco |

=== Television ===
| Year | Title | Character | Channel | Notes |
|---|---|---|---|---|
| 1993 | Uno más uno | Claudia | Canal 13 | |
| 1993 | Vivo con un fantasma | | Canal 13 | |
| 1994 | Sin condena | | Canal 9 | "Episode: El caso Guns 'N Roses" |
| 1995 | La hermana mayor | María | Canal 9 | |
| 1996 | Alta comedia | | Canal 9 | "Episode: Fuerte como la muerte" |
| 1996 | De poeta y de loco | | Canal 13 | |
| 1996 | Los especiales de Doria | | Telefe | "Episode: El jorobadito" |
| 1997 | Homenaje al Teatro Nacional Contemporáneo | | Canal 9 | |
| 2000 | Tiempo final | Sandra | Telefe | "Episode 14: El suicida" |
| 2001 | 22, el loco | Ana Pandolfi | Canal 13 | |
| 2002 | Tiempo final | Amparo | Telefe | "Episode 46: La tabernera" |
| 2004 | Locas de amor | Simona Teglia | Canal 13 | |
| 2005 | Botines | Sara | Canal 13 | "Episode 3: Casino premium" |
| 2005 | Botines | Mariana | Canal 13 | "Episode 8: Muerto otra vez" |
| 2005 | Botines | Lourdes Irazábal | Canal 13 | "Episode 10: Feliz año nuevo, mi amor" |
| 2006 | Mujeres asesinas | Susana | Canal 13 | "Episode 8: Susana, dueña de casa" |
| 2006 | Mujeres asesinas | Eliana | Canal 13 | "Episode 25: Eliana, cuñada" |
| 2006 | Al límite | Rocío | Canal 13 | "Episode 3: Asesinos al sueldo" |
| 2006 | Sos mi vida | Caty | Canal 13 | |
| 2007 | Mujeres asesinas | Perla | Canal 13 | "Episode 7: Perla, anfitriona" |
| 2008 | Algo habrán hecho por la historia argentina | Eva Duarte | Telefe | Season 3 "Episode 4: Lo que va a venir" |
| 2009 | Tratame bien | Sabrina | Canal 13 | |
| 2010 | Impostores | Vicky | Canal 13 | |
| 2010 | Lo que el tiempo nos dejó | Jania | Telefe | "Episode 6: Un mundo mejor" |
| 2011 | El elegido | Verónica San Martín | Telefe | |
| 2012 | Condicionados | Darling | Canal 13 | |
| 2012 | Graduados | Claudina Haras | Telefe | |
| 2014 | Mis amigos de siempre | Carolina Pires | Canal 13 | |
| 2014 | Camino al amor | Guillermina Dubois | Telefe | |
| 2018 | El lobista | Natalia Ocampo | Canal 13 | |
| 2021 | La 1-518, somos uno | TBA | Canal 13 | |
| 2026 | Moria | Susana Giménez | Netflix | |

=== Theater ===
| Year | Title | Character | Director | Theater |
|---|---|---|---|---|
| 1997 | Martha Stutz | | | |
| 1998 | Seis personajes en busca de autor | | | |
| 1999 | Closer | | | |
| 2007 | La cola del avión en 4 patas | | Cristian Morales | Teatro El cubo |
| 2010 | Dragón de Komodo | | Cristian Morales | |
| 2010 | Dragón de Komodo 2 | | Cristian Morales | |
| 2015 | OrguYO | Lina | Cristian Morales | G104 |
| 2016 | Franciscus. Una razón para vivir | Mother | Flavio Mendoza | Teatro Broadway |
| 2020 | Un poco más Salvaje | | Leticia Brédice | |

=== Television Programs ===
| Year | Program | Channel | Notes |
|---|---|---|---|
| 2007 | Susana Gimenéz | Telefe | Guest |
| 2015 | Tu cara me suena (Season 3) | Telefe | Participant |
| 2016 | Bailando 2016 | Canal 13 | Guest |
| 2019 | Bailando 2019 | Canal 13 | Participant |
| 2020–present | Incorrectas | América TV | Panelist |

== Awards and nominations ==
| Year | Award | Category | Program | Result |
|---|---|---|---|---|
| 1997 | Silver Condor Awards | Best Supporting Actress | Años rebeldes | Winner |
| 1998 | Silver Condor Awards | Female Revelation | Ashes of Paradise | Winner |
| 2001 | Martín Fierro Awards | Best Actress in a Novel | 22, el loco | Winner |
| 2001 | Konex Foundation | Merit Diploma | Film Actress | Winner |
| 2002 | Martín Fierro Awards | Special Female Participation | Tiempo final | Nominated |
| 2004 | Martín Fierro Awards | Best Actress in a Miniseries | Locas de amor | Nominated |
| 2004 | Los Premios MTV Latinoamérica | Best New South Artist | | Nominated |
| 2006 | Martín Fierro Awards | Special Participation in Fiction | Sos mi vida | Nominated |
| 2009 | Martín Fierro Awards | Special Participation in Fiction | Tratame bien | Nominated |
| 2010 | Martín Fierro Awards | Best Actress in a Miniseries | Impostores | Nominated |
| 2010 | Martín Fierro Awards | Best Actress in a Miniseries | Lo que el tiempo nos dejó | Nominated |
| 2011 | Martín Fierro Awards | Best Actress in a Novel | El elegido | Winner |
| 2011 | Tato Awards | Leading Actress | El elegido | Winner |
| 2011 | Konex Foundation | Merit Diploma | Television Actress | Winner |
| 2012 | Tato Awards | Supporting Actress in Unitary Fiction | Condicionados | Nominated |
| 2015 | Tato Awards | Revelation | Tu cara me suena (Season 3) | Nominated |
| 2018 | Martín Fierro Awards | Best Actress in a Miniseries | El lobista | Winner |
